= Adabel Guerrero =

Ukrainian-Argentine burlesque dancer and vedette (born 1978)

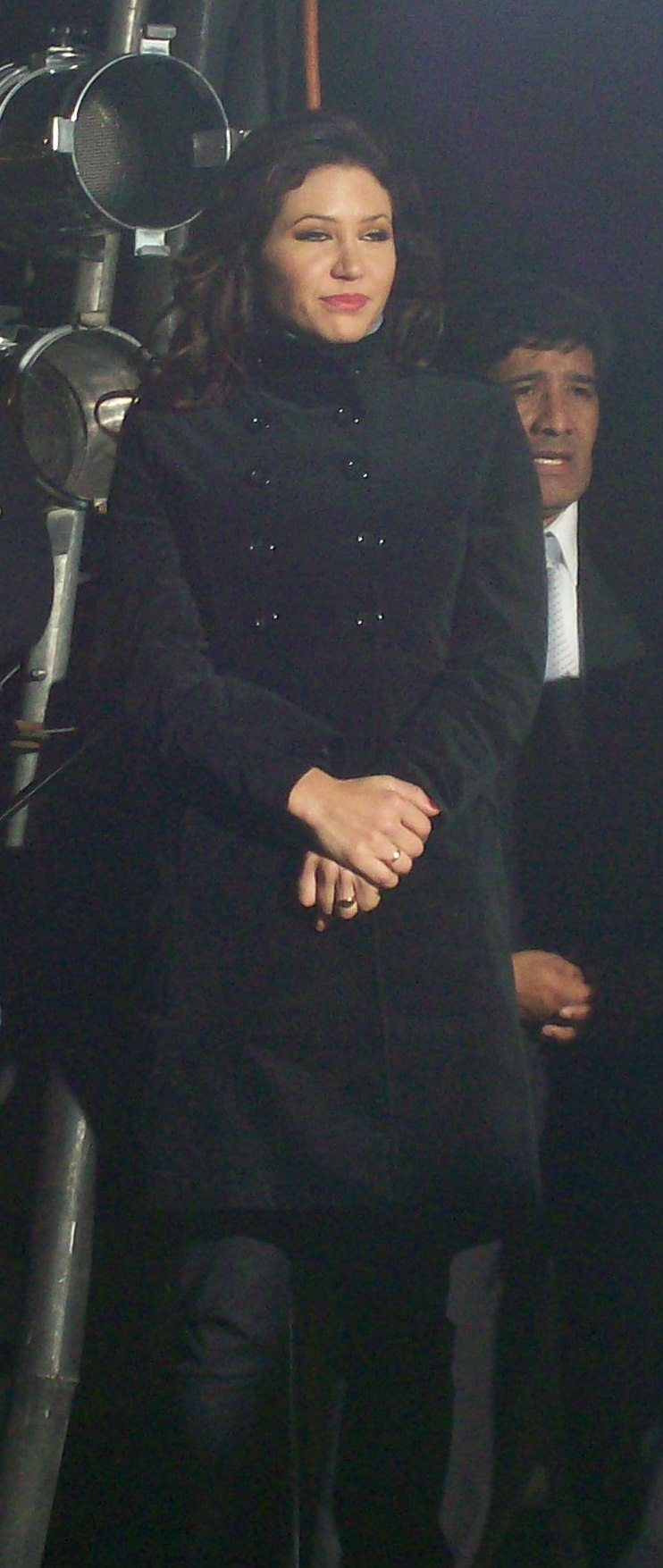
- Guerrero in 2009
- Born: Adabel Anahí Guerrero Melachenko; 18 July 1978 (age 48); La Plata, Argentina
- Known for: Dance and choreography Acting; Theatre; Modeling; Singing
- Movement: Ballet and pole dance Comedy; Revue and musical comedy Fashion, glamour and bikini Ballads and a cappellas
- Spouse: Martín Lamela
- Awards: Concert Award 2011 - Outstanding Vedette

Adabel Anahí Guerrero Melachenko (Spanish pronunciation: [aðaˈβel ɣeˈreɾo]; born 18 July 1978), better known simply as Adabel Guerrero, is an Argentine professional theater and burlesque dancer, actress, and supervedette, who has also dabbled as a model and as a singer in several television, magazine and theater appearances. Guerrero has worked as a television co-hostess and panelist, and is currently a panelist on El Chimentero 3.0.

Guerrero has participated in multiple seasons of the Argentine version of Dancing with the Stars, Bailando por un Sueño, competing together with professional dancers Martín Whitecamp, Joel Ledesma, Reynaldo Ojeda and many others. She has also appeared on many spin-offs of the show.

== Career ==
=== Early ===
Adabel Guerrero began her career in a dance school in the city of La Plata. At the time, and being a professor of classical dance, she became part of the play Ballet del Teatro Argentino. She then became a dancer for professional dancer Iñaki Urlezaga for seven years. When Pepe Cibrian saw her, he signed her in the musical comedy El Fantasma de Canterville, but Adabel was most flattered in theater magazines. Guerrero worked alongside the likes of Ethel Rojo, el Negro Álvarez, Laura Fidalgo, and as the lead female dancer of Jorge Corona. Reina Reech discovered Guerrero in casting for Miguel Ángel Cherutti and Carmen Barbieri's magazine "Irresistible", and she was called to be one of the figures of the show, where she showed her skills as a vedette, singing, and dancing.

=== Theatre ===
Year(s)	Musical show	Notes
2003	Cinderella	Fairy Godmother Singer and dancer; ballerina
2003	Ballet del Teatro Argentino	Dancer; ballerina Seven years in the cast
2004	Buenos Aires al rojo vivo	Dancer
2005	El humor no tiene trabas	Actress
2006	Pasajeros de la risa	Actress
2007	Irresistible, otra historia de humor	Outstanding singer and vedette after 1st Vedette Valeria Archimaut 1st Dancer alongside Sabrina Ravelli
2008	El Fantasma de Canterville	Actress, dancer
2008	Incomparable, el humor continua	Outstanding dancer; ballerina and Half Vedette 3rd Vedette
2008–2009	La fiesta está en el lago	Co-lead Vedette alongside Mónica Farro and Valeria Archimó
2009	Doña flor y sus dos maridos	Replacement for 1st Actress, dancer, singer
2010	Primera dama se busca	2nd Actress
2010	Carnaval de estrellas	1st Vedette replacement covering Jésica Cirio Joined party in June 2010; Music hall debuted 18 December 2009, re-debuted 26 March 2010
2010	Glamoreé 4	Guest performer
2010–2012	Excitante	1st Vedette followed by Jésica Cirio Lead acrobat-dancer; prima ballerina and singer
2011	Cruz-Aquadance: espacio	One night two-men one-woman zumanity show alongside Flavio Mendoza and Adrián Kiss
2011	La Revista de Buenos Aires	One week replacement for 1st Vedette Covering Valeria Archimó
2011	América 20Diez, La Revista	Guest performer
2012	Hasta la Re-vista, Baby!	Lead Supervedette; Mini-revue dance musical Lead star dancer
2012	El diluvio que viene	1st Actress, dancer, singer September - November
2012–present	Stravaganza: Estados del Tiempo	2012-13: Lead Supervedette accompanied by Flavio Mendoza, followed by Belén Pouchán 2014: Lead Supervedette, followed by Belén Pouchán, André Minkus and Federico Molinari 2015–present: Lead Supervedette accompanied by Florencia De La V, followed by Nicolás Scarpino, Christian Sancho, Belén Pouchán and Fernanda Mitilli Lead acrobat-dancer
2014–present	Señor Tango	Star dancer

=== Music ===
Year	Song	Notes	Producer	Director
2009	Una Mañana de Verano	With Diego Perci	Luciana Elbusto	Javier Cantero
2011	Bam Bam	With Banda XXI Taped on 3 September		

=== Modeling ===
In 2008 Guerrero modeled for Maxim in Argentina for the March and July covers. She modeled again for Maxim in 2009 for its January cover. In July 2008 she modeled for Paparazzi alongside Valeria Archimó in an erotic photo shoot. In 2009 Guerrero modeled as the Feyvi girl of that year, turning her into a sex symbol. In 2010 Guerrero modeled for both Paparazzi in an erotic photo shoot and for Playboy for the March cover of the Argentine edition.

In 2011 the dancer-actress again modeled for the Argentine celebrity-gossip magazine Paparazzi in three separate erotic photo shoots. In 2012 she modeled a sixth time for the same magazine in an exclusive bikini photo shoot. She modeled in July 2011 for the Argentine men's magazine "H"ombre in a highly erotic photo shoot. That same year, in November, Guerrero created a portfolio of herself named "Dulce Rock" (Sweet Rock), with photos taken by Aníbal Pérez and clothing by Marta Trobbiani and Gisela Sabino. She also modeled for the magazine Caras in a tribute to 20th-century supervedette Nélida Roca. She has also modeled in tribute to Madonna.

Guerrero was the face of both the TOUT 2011 bikini and fitness collection and the Noelia Vardaro 2012 bikini collection. She was also the star model for Daniel Vega alongside Andréa Estévez (c. 2009).

Since October 2014, Guerrero has been the face of "Adrenalina" by Image Joyas.

== 2007–2012: Theatre and dance ==
=== Theatre ===
In 2007, she was called to perform in Barbieri and Cherruti's musical sequel Irresistible, Otra Historia de Humor, where she starred alongside Miguel Angel Cherutti, Carmen Barbieri, Rodrigo Rodríguez, Alacrán, Sabrina Ravelli and Valeria Archimaut under the artistic and creative direction of Reina Reech. The book was by Sergio Marcos and Martín Guerra, and the main producers and directors were Miguel Ángel Cherutti and Aldo Aresi. She starred as a vedette and dancer alongside Valeria Archimó and a great body of professional dancers including Sabrina Ravelli (Lead Dancer), Ariel Pastocchi, Pablo Lena, Agustín Maccagno, Cristian Ponce, Natalia Perea, Dominique Pestaña, Yamila Ramírez and Emilia Chaya. She also sang in the show.

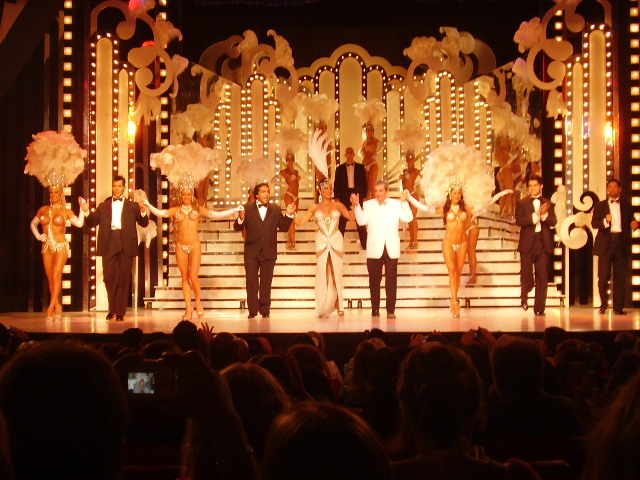
Guerrero (third left) in La Fiesta Está en el Lago

In 2008, she was called for Incomparable, the new proposal of Miguel Angel and Carmen Barbieri Cherutti, a show that starred Miguel Ángel Cherutti, Carmen Barbieri, Celina Rucci, Rodrigo Rodríguez, Diego Reinhold, Adabel Guerrero and Vanina Escudero. During the 2008-2009 theater season, she formed part of the staff of Gerardo Sofovich in his magazine La Fiesta Está en el Lago (The party is in the Lake) where the show was led by Florencia De La V and followed by Guerrero as outstanding vedette next to Valeria Archimó and Mónica Farro. The magazine also starred el Negro Álvarez.

In 2009, Guerrero starred in the comedy Doña Flor y sus Dos Maridos in Buenos Aires with Norma Pons. During the summer season of 2009–2010 in Mar del Plata she co-starred in the comedy Primera dama se busca with Nito Artaza, Fabian Gianola and María Eugenia Ritó.

In March 2010, Guerrero replaced Jésica Cirio as the first vedette of the music hall Carnaval de Etrellas, with Estela Raval, Raúl Lavié, Flavio Mendoza and many others.

=== Excitante ===
She was the lead vedette of the theatre show Excitante composed of important personalities from the art.

She was featured alongside Argentine acrobat-dancers Cinthia Fernández, Estefanía Bacca and Flavio Mendoza (also the head choreographer of the show), as well as model and dancer Jésica Cirio, model and lawyer Alejandra Maglietti and Uruguayan professional dancer-actress Virginia Dobrich.

The magazine debuted on 2 December in the theatre of Mar del Plata. The producer was Daniel Comba and the show was led and presented by Miguel Angel Cherutti and Nito Artaza. Other cast members were Luciana Salazar, Estela Raval, Bicho Gómez and Campi.

The musical has finished its fourth and last musical cycle. The show was formed by Adabel Guerrero, Jésica Cirio, Cinthia Fernández, Alejandra Maglietti, Estefanía Bacca, Virginia Dobrich, Carmen Flores, Miguel Angel Cherutti, Nito Artaza, Marcos "Bicho" Gómez, Estela Raval, los 5 Latinos and Ádrian Kiss, the show's lead male dancer and acrobat.

== 2012–present: New ground projects ==
=== Music ===
On 5 January 2012, Guerrero commented on the show 7 en 1 presented by Daniel Ambrosino and Cora de Barbieri that she was working on a singing career. On 3 November 2011, Guerrero taped a video with the band Banda XXI of her dancing to their song "Bam Bam". In February 2013 she commented that she was still taking singing classes as well as theater, and was working on creating her band and tour:

"Singing is what gives me more pleasure, even more than dance. It's a dream to fulfill. For now I put it in the musical comedy, but someday I'd like to put together a band and tour."

=== Cantando 2012 ===
She participated in Cantando por un sueño 2012. She was partnered with Nicolas martinelli and is coached by Rodrigo Segura. Guerrero and the show debuted on 13 April, live on channel El Trece. She was eliminated in the eighth round by boxer La Mole Moli.

Round #	Song	Judges' score					Result	Notes
Round #	Song	Galán J.	Galán L.	Mediavilla	Polino	Lynch	Result	Notes
1	"Tan Sólo Tú"	9	8	6	5	8	Safe	Fourth highest score Opening act
2	"Vivir lo nuestro"	8	8	8	3	8	Safe	Fourth highest score
3	"Looking for Paradise"	6	7	6	3	6	Saved	Bottom 3
4	"Por Amarte Así"	-					Saved	Elimination round^{[1]}
5	"Ven Conmigo"	-					Saved	Elimination round^{[1]}
6	"Vivir sin aire"	-					Saved	Elimination round^{[1]}
7	"Amor a la mexicana"	none	8	7	10	8	Safe	Highest score
8	"No me ames"	7	7	6	4	7	Eliminated	Sent to the public vote Second lowest score

- Saved by the public: Fabio "La Mole" Moli (56,96%)
- Eliminated: Adabel Guerrero (43,04%)
- ^[1] During these rounds, all the couples sang in a duel. (Round 4)The judges did not score the performances; instead, they saved 12 couples, and the other 3 went to the public vote. 2 couples were eliminated. (Round 5)The judges did not score the performances; instead, they saved 11 couples, and the other 2 went to the public vote, ending with one of them being eliminated.(Round 6)The judges did not score the performances; instead, they saved 10 couples, and the other 2 went to the public vote, ending with one of them being eliminated.

=== Theatre 2012–present ===
On 26 April, Guerrero was asked by Beto César, ex-husband of Carmen Barbieri as well as one of her musical producers, if she would act in Barbieri's and Casán's new musical revue show, Escándalosas. She was not signed to perform. Guerrero was the lead supervedette of the theater magazine, Hasta la Re-vista, Baby! alongside magician El Mago Zaul, actor-comedian Marcelo Barbosa, 1st vedette Maira Barrionuevo, 2nd vedette Brenda Ríos, Humor en 3D (a comedy trio), vedette China Moor, and a hugh cast of dancers, actors, acrobats, comedians and musicians. The revue debuted on 25 October in the city of Rosario.

==== El diluvio que viene ====
In 19 September, Guerrero debuted as Consuelo (the lead role), in the re-adaptation of the Italian musical comedy, Aggiungi un posto a tavola (El diluvio que viene) in Avenue Corrientes, Buenos Aires at the Lola Membrives theatre. She starred alongside Juan Durán and Natalie Pérez with Pablo Nápoli, Juan Bautista Carreras, María Teresita del Río and Tamara Solange, María Fernanda Álvarez, Antonella Fucci, Melisa Fucci, Natalia Mouras, Manuela Núñez, Andrea Oyanto, Lucía Valenti, Santiago Almaraz, Rodrigo Cuello, Marcelo Durán, Ezeqiel Fernanz, Santiago Santacruz, Diego Respigo, Juan Quiroga, Jorge Cegretti and Mikhael Sánchez. The musical comedy was produced and directed by Laura Fidalgo, Juan Durán, Chino Carreras, Gabriel Giangrante, Martín Bianchedi, Rubén Cuello, Pepe Cibrián and Angel Maler, and was created by Pietro Garinei and Sandro Giovannini.

==== Stravaganza ====
Guerrero, after auditioning and long planning with Flavio Mendoza, was called to star in the second version of Stravaganza as its star leading supervedette. It was confirmed that the supervedette has accepted to lead the second cycle of the largest theatre musical of 2011 and 2012, Stravaganza. The musical is a mix of classical Argentine revue and Cirque du Soleil-like performances. It was mainly produced and directed by Mendoza, Ariel Diwan and Romina Propato, who was also the main choreographer. She led the show alongside Argentine Olympic gymnast Federico Molinari; theater producer, director, choreographer, acrobat, dancer and creator of the musicals, Flavio Mendoza; acrobat gymnast and acro-dancer Belén Pouchán; singers Luciano Bassi and Yanina Giunta; clown-acrobat Bruno Pedro; and comedy group Lo Lumvrise; among others, for a total of 49 artist on stage.

The cirques revue's "Water in Art" (Facundo Mazzei, Cinthia Fernández, Noelia Pompa) version re-debuted on 31 October 2012, in Buenos Aires, and the "Estados del Tiempo" (Flavio Mendoza, Adabel Guerrero, Federico Molinari) version was to debut on 21 December in Villa Carlos Paz, in the Luxor theatre. The musical was moved from 21 to 25 December, because production was not done and Maximiliano Morales Bravo, a 19-year-old acrobat-dancer of the musical, was staved on the 21st (survived and was released from the hospital on 25 December).

It was planned to have a long lasting international tour, as the idea was based in New York. The show's debut was the highest seen theater show debut of the season in Villa Carlos Paz, and gained highly positive comments from its viewers:

"Spectacular scenography. Really overcomes in all respects to all the shows I've seen in my life. The costumes, the cast all flawless. - Great, Adabel a genius, far the best of all. Also came last year (Stravaganza: Water in Art) and Flavio has really succeeded. - We always follow him, Flavio is amazing. The best artist that the villa has this summer. Last year was incredible and now it's just amazing. Do not miss it, great costumes, the scenery, everything spotless."

As of 14 January 2013, Stravaganza had sold the most tickets in Villa Carlos Paz, with over 14.100 sales, double the best-selling ticket in Mar del Plata. As of February, 2013, the music hall-cirques had passed sales of 100.000 tickets and was planning on performing until the end of March, later to debut in the Broadway theatre in mid-2013.

On 4 January 2014, Stravaganza re-debuted in Teatro Broadway of Buenos Aires Province with Adabel Guerrero leading the show, Belén Pouchán, Spanish dancer André Minkus replacing Flavio Mendoza, and Federico Molinari as the stars of the show along with more than 50 artists on stage.

Stravaganza returned to the theater Luxor in Villa Carlos Paz on 19 December 2014, for the 2014–2015 summer theater season and was scheduled to act in Carlos Paz up to 28 February 2015. The show was then led by Florencia de la V, Adabel Guerrero, Nicolás Scarpino, Christian Sancho, Belén Pouchán, Fernanda Mitilli and more than 50 other artists on stage.

==== Señor Tango ====
Guerrero is currently one of the star tango dancers of the classical Argentine tango show Señor Tango alongside its creator Fernando Soler and Uruguayan dancer, actress and model, Andrea Ghidone, since mid-2014.

=== TV hosting ===
In 2012, Guerrero was co-hosting as panelist on the resuming gossip show, La Previa Del Show, alongside lead host, Teto Medína. Guerrero later returned to the cable with Medína to host a gossip show for 2013, El Chimentero 3.0. The next year she continued working as a panelist on the show. Guerrero is currently on license from her job on the show since 31 October and may not return for 2015.

=== Dance school ===
In a photoshoot interview for Ciudad.com, Guerrero commented that she was "opening [a] dance school on March 15 in Castelar... [and] will give seminars and [has] another project but [she] will not say anything... "

== Showmatch ==
Guerrero has participated in two seasons of Bailando por un Sueño as an official contestant, and in two more as a replacement. She has also participated as an official contestant in El Musical de tus Sueños, an alternate version of Bailando. She did a replacement in 2007, in the first season of Patinando por un Sueño (the Argentine version of Skating with the Stars). She later participated in the second season as an official contestant. She also participated as a guest celebrity for a special trio round.

=== Patinando por un Sueño 2007 ===
Guerrero replaced Natalia Fava during four rounds of the competition, skating with professional partner Gastón Passini. She also replaced Valeria Archimó in the thirteenth round, with professional partner Daniel Cejas.

Round #	Dance/song	Judges' score				Result
Round #	Dance/song	Ubfal	Polino	Reech	De La V	Result
4	Salsa/ "Sobreviviré"	10	10	10	10	Safe
5	Latin Romantic/ "Ayer"	10	10	9	9	Safe
6	1980s/ "Can't Fight This Feeling"	10	9	9	9	Safe
7	Latin pop/ "El Problema"	10	9	9	9	Safe
13	Divas/ "Heaven Is a Place on Earth"	7	6	7	7	Saved

=== Patinando por un Sueño 2008 ===
In 2008, and at the same time she was a contestant in Bailando por un Sueño 2008, Adabel participated in the second season of Patinando por un Sueño with professional figure skater Javier Anzil. She reached the top 8 (out of 19 contestants), later being eliminated a double elimination by receiving 27,58% of the public vote, losing to model Rocío Marengo and figure skater Andrés Ciacia, who received 54.40% of the votes. The other person eliminated was model and dancer Andrea Estévez, with 18.10% of the votes.

Round #	Dance/song	Judges' score				Result
Round #	Dance/song	Ubfal	Polino	Reech	De La V	Result
1	Music from Movies/ "My Heart Will Go On"	7	6	8	8	Safe
2	Adagio/ "I Don't Want to Miss a Thing"	9	9	9	9	Safe
3	Disco/ "Last Dance"	9	8	9	9	Safe
4	Reggaeton/ "La vecinita"	9	5	10	10	Safe
5	Cumbia/ "Esa malvada"	10	10	10	10	Safe
6	Rock n roll/ "Tutti Frutti"	9	8	8	8	Safe
7	Club Music/ "Sweet Dreams (Are Made of This)"	9	8	9	9	Safe
7	Axé/ "Dança da Garrafa"	10	8	10	10	Safe
8	Hip hop/ "Pump It"	8	7	9	8	Saved
9	Halloween/ "Smooth Criminal"	10	9	8	9	Safe
10	Cuarteto/ "Soy cordobés"	8	8	7	7	Eliminated

=== Bailando por un Sueño 2008 ===
In 2008, Guerrero entered into the competition in the second round, replacing former porn star Ilona "Cicciolina" Staller, and danced with professional dance partner and model Joel Ledesma. Guerrero was eliminated in the twenty-second round by receiving 43.60% of the vote, against the 57.40% obtained by Evangelina Anderson. Guerrero got the opportunity to re-enter the competition in the twenty-fourth round, after dancing in a special edition and being picked by the judges. She was eliminated again in the thirty-second round, by receiving 14.20%, two rounds by the semi-final (sixth place).

She was bested by Valeria Archimó, who reached the semi-finals (third place, tied with María Fernanda Callejón), yet she passed Mónica Farro by two rounds.

Round no.	Dance or song	Judges' score				Result
Round no.	Dance or song	Barbieri	Lafauci	Casán	Sofovich	Result
2	Salsa/ "La Vida Es Un Carnaval"	9	4	9	10	Safe
3	Rock and roll/ "Good Golly Miss Molly"	9	5	8	8	Safe
4	Cumbia/ "Porque Te Amo"	10	5	9	10	Safe
5	Axé/ "Tesouro de Pirata"	10	5	9	9	Safe
6	Hip-hop/ "SexyBack"	10	6	9	8	Safe
7	Cha-cha-cha/ "Menta y Canela"	8	5	8	7	Safe
8	Adagio/ "When a Man Loves a Woman"	8	4	8	8	Safe
9	Lambada/ "Lamba Caribe"	10	5	8	8	Safe
10	Reggaeton/ "El Empuje"	9	5	8	8	Safe
11	Latin pop/ "Salomé"	10	7	9	10	Safe
12	Music videos/ "Ven Conmigo (Solamente Tú)"	10	6	8	9	Safe
13	Cuarteto/ "Entre La Noche y El Día"	8	4	8	8	Saved
14	Pole dance/ "Everybody Get Up"	10	7	10	10	Safe
15	Beat music/ "La Chica de la Boutique"	10	7	10	10	Safe
16	Arabic music/ "Molfet Lel Nazar"	10	7	10	10	Safe
17	Latin adagio/ "Me Va A Extrañar"	10	7	10	10	Safe
18	Jive/ "I Love You 'Cause I Want To"	8	5	8	8	Safe
19	Strip dance/ "Kiss"	9	5	8	9	Safe
20	Argentine rock/ "Demoliendo Hoteles"	10	6	10	10	Safe
21	Aero dance/ "Amor a la Mexicana (Fiesta Latina Club Mix)"	9	5	8	9	Safe
22	Merengue/ "El Baile del Perrito"	8	5	8	8	Eliminated
Re-Entry	Cuarteto/ "El agite"	-				Re-Entered
24	Jazz/ "I Get a Kick out of You"	7	4	8	8	Safe
25	Country/ "Hot Rod Heart"	10	7	10	10	Safe
26	Divas/ "Jump"	8	5	9	8	Safe
27	Adagio from telenovelas/ "Mentira"	9	6	10	9	Safe
28	Aquadance/ "Ordinary World"	10	6	10	10	Safe
29	Dancing in the rain/ "Love Is in the Air"	9	5	8	9	Safe
30	Samba/ "La Tortura"	9	5	9	8	Safe
30	Dancing in the snow/ "Da Ya Think I'm Sexy?"	9	6	9	9	Safe
31	Pole dance/ "New Sensation"	9	6	10	8	Safe
31	Latin pop/ "Baila Baila"	7	4	7	9	Safe
32	Cha-cha-cha/ "Ríe y Llora"	-				Eliminated

=== El Musical de tus Sueños ===
In 2009, Guerrero participated in El Musical de tus Sueños, an alternate Argentinian season of Bailando por un Sueño, as the replacement of Wanda Nara in the re-entry before the fourteenth round. Guerrero was eliminated in 16th place with 46.37% of the public vote.

Round no.	Dance or song	Judges' score				Result
Round no.	Dance or song	Alfano	Pachano	Reech	Lynch	Result
Re-entry	Pole dance/ "Always on the Run"	–				Re-entered
14	Argentinian hits / "Cómo Olvidarla"	10	8	10	10	Safe
15	Reggaeton / "Abusadora"	9	8	10	10	Safe
16	Merengue/ "Suavemente"	–				Saved
17	Cumbia/ "Paisaje"	–				Eliminated

=== Bailando 2010 ===
In the sixth season of Bailando, she replaced Sofía Zámolo during the eighth round.

Round #	Dance/song	Judges' score					Result
Round #	Dance/song	Alfano	Fort	Pachano	Reech	Barbieri	Result
8	Cha-cha-cha/ "Para toda la vida"	10	10	5	10	9	Safe

=== Bailando 2011 ===
Guerrero participated in the seventh season of Bailando por un Sueño with professional dancer Martín Whitecamp. She reached the top 8 (out of 30 contestants), later being eliminated in the phone bin by receiving 41.28% of the public vote, losing to security guard Héctor "Tito" Speranza and professional dancer Nadia Hair.

Round #	Dance/song	Judges' score					Result
Round #	Dance/song	Alfano	Mendoza	Casán	Pachano	Polino	Result
1	Latin pop/ "Ave María"	10	9	10	9	10	Safe
2	Cha-Cha-Cha/ "Sway"	8	10	10	9	10	Safe
3	Adagio/ "Lady in Red"	9	5	7	6	5	Safe
4	Axé/ "Treme Terra"	9	9	10	7	6	Safe
5	Reggaeton/ "Pose"	10	10	10	8	6	Safe
6	Cumbia/ "Cumbia Apretadita"	8	8	10	4	3	Safe
7	Pole dance/ "Come Together"	8	10	7	8	10	Safe
8	Latin adagio/ "Tal Vez"	10	9	9	8	4	Safe
9	Cuarteto/ "Adicto a Ti"	8	9	9	6	4	Safe
10	Disco/ "Canned Heat"	10	9	10	7	7	Safe
11	Strip dance/ "Kiss"	10	9	8	6	5	Safe
12	Electro dance/ "Where Them Girls At"	10	9	10	5	3	Safe
13	Merengue/ "Muévelo"	10	10	10	7	5	Safe
14	Music videos/ "Judas"	8	10	8	7	7	Safe
15	Aquadance/ "I Don't Want to Miss a Thing"	9	7	7	6	5	Saved
16	Arabic music/ "Isis"	10	8	7	5	4	Saved
17	Dancing in the rain/ "Hush Hush"	6	6	6	4	4	Saved
18	Adagio from telenovelas/ "Bésame la Boca"	10	10	9	6	5	Safe
19	Gilda & Rodrigo Tribute/ "Fuiste"	6	7	5	5	5	Eliminated

=== Bailando 2012 ===
In the eight season, she replaced Valeria Archimó during the fifth round. From round 7, Valeria Archimó was permanently replaced by Adabel Guerrero and amputee salsa dancer Reinaldo Ojeda. Yet in the 7th round she was replaced by actress-comedian Belén Francese because of some scheduling problems Guerrero was having. As of round 10 there were only five judges, not six, as Antonio Gasalla quit. On 30 October, Guerrero and Ojeda were eliminated by receiving 40.12% of the public vote, losing to model Verónica Perdomo and dancer Pablo Juin.

Round #	Dance/song	Judges' score						Result
Round #	Dance/song	Barbieri	Mendoza	Casán	Pachano	Gasalla	Polino	Result
5	Strip dance/ "Live and Let Die"	10	9	10	7	10	10	Safe; Fourth highest score
8	Aquadance/ "Fix You"	10	10	10	8	10	9	Safe; Third highest score
9	Videoclip/ "Firework"	10	8	8	5	8	6	Safe; Fourth highest score
10	Arabic music on the sand/ "El Leilah"	10	10	9	10	10	9	Safe; Second highest score
11	Electro dance/ "Hello"	4	6	4	2	-	1	Eliminated; Lowest score

- Saved by the public: Verónica Perdomo (59.88%)
- Eliminated: Adabel Guerrero and Reinaldo Ojeda (40.12%)

=== Bailando 2014 ===
On 12 September Guerrero made a special participation on the ninth season of ShowMatch's Bailando por un Sueño as a third dance partner for dancer-choreographer Mora Godoy and dancer Marcos Ayala.

Round #	Dance/song	Judges' score				Result
Round #	Dance/song	Nacha; Guevara	Moria; Casán	Soledad; Silveyra	Marcelo; Polino	Result
11	Acrobatic Salsa in Trio/ "Sonora Carruseles"	9	8	9	9	Safe; Second Highest Score

== Inspirations ==
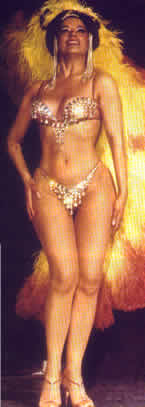
Nélida Roca

When asked about her inspiration on dancing, Guerrero responded:

"Julio Bocca, Maximiliano Guerra, Hernán Piquín... They are the highest in Argentina, each with their own style. Maxi, more manly, more land, and Julio and Piquín more princely, more aerial. There is no first or second, they are different from each other.They have broken their souls to get to where they are now."

Guerrero says that dance itself is her inspiration:

"To me, dancing transports me, it's an absolute passion. Dancing is the best, its orgasmic."

She has also said that singing has inspired her to keep living when she did not want to. In 2010 for a magazine she named Nélida Roca as her biggest inspiration as a vedette while she was also making a tribute to her:

"I am not at the height of Nélida, but I wish to be so one day. She is my inspiration and this is a tribute from my desire to ever achieve that excellence."

== Background and personal life ==
She is of Ukrainian (Rusyn), Spanish (Aragonese) and some Italian descent. After Guerrero and her brother Emiliano Cid Guerrero Melachenko (born 18 July 1975) were born, her parents moved from La Plata to the United States. When Guerrero was just two years old, they separated. Her father continued his life in the USA while she returned to Buenos Aires with her mother and brother Emiliano.

Her brother later moved to Mar del Plata and left her and her mother alone. After a difficult illness, Guerrero's mother died three days before Guerrero's birthday, leaving her alone in Buenos Aires. In 2009 Guerrero's father died, which got her to see the world in a more spiritual way.

Guerrero has said that her mother taught her yoga and reading aged 3 and aged 7 her mother took her to her first dance lessons because she was always playing street football. Guerrero studied psychology as an alternative career future, which was never finalized. She has commented that she will finish her studies when possible. She confirmed on 15 February 2014, that she was finishing her studies in psychology.

In 2011 her brother Emiliano started attacking her in the media, talking about her "very dark" past and saying that people didn't know the real Adabel Guerrero. He has many medical conditions and has been in and out of prison and rehab.

On 5 March 2014 Guerrero expressed to Caras her desire to have a child, preferring a girl. She also commented about her hobbies and preferences, making a family and relaxing at home, decorating her house, staying by the pool and enjoying nature with her husband.

As of 2018, Guerrero was living in Buenos Aires, Argentina with spouse Martín Lamela, and was pregnant with her first child, which was due in the spring of 2018. She is the step-mother of Lamela's two sons.

== Public image ==
"Do not depend on anyone, even your own shadow disappears in moments of darkness."

— Adabel Guerrero

Adabel Guerrero
- Writing career
- Notable works: Excitante; El diluvio que viene

Guerrero was voted as the best vedette of 2012, competing against 17 others like Jésica Cirio, Claudia Albertario, Andrea Ghidone, Mónica González de Listorti, Valeria Archimó and Mónica Farro, receiving 25.00% of the public vote (2,611 votes, out of a total of 10,393).

She was again awarded as the best vedette for 2013, with 33.33% of the public vote (3,666 votes, out of a total of 11,000), competing against 12 other vedettes: Vanesa Carbone, Soledad Cescato, Cinthia Fernández, Rocío Guirao Díaz, Andrea Ghidone, Lorena Liggi, Celeste Muriega, Noelia Pompa, Andrea Rincón, Stefanía Xipolitakis and Victoria Xipolitakis.

== Awards ==
Year	Award	Category	Work	Result
2011	Concert Award	Concert Award for Outstanding Vedette	Excitante	Won
2013	Premios Carlos	Premio Villa Carlos Paz for Best Female Dancer	Stravaganza: Estados del Tiempo	Nominated
2013	Premios Carlos	Premio Villa Carlos Paz for Best Vedette	Stravaganza: Estados del Tiempo	Won
2013	Concert Award	Concert Award for Outstanding Vedette	Stravaganza: Estados del Tiempo	Won

== See also ==
- List of prima ballerinas
- List of glamour models

== Sources ==
- "Dejé de convivir con mi novio para no matar el amor" (in Spanish). El País. 6 July 2008.
- "Otra vez, Adabel Guerrero dice que cumple 21" (in Spanish). Terra. July 2009. Archived from the original on 16 March 2018.
- "Los eternos 21 años de Adabel Guerrero" (in Spanish). El Argentino. 19 July 2009. Archived from the original on 10 July 2011.
