= Valeria Archimó =

Argentine theater dancer, supervedette, choreographer and theater creative director

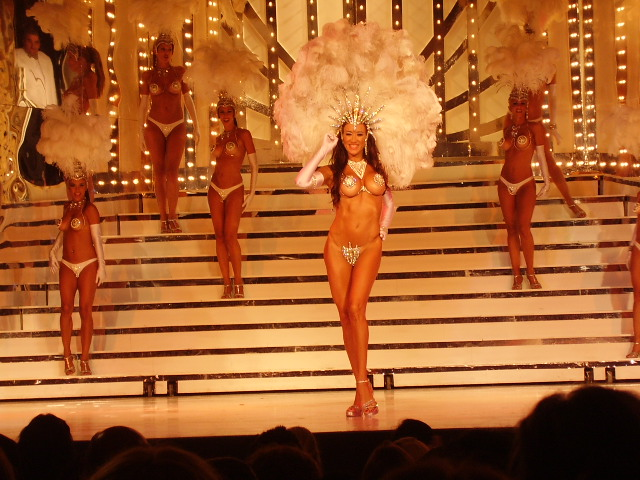
- Born: Valeria Constanza Archimaut; January 14, 1972 (age 54); Buenos Aires, Argentina
- Occupations: Vedette, dancer, choreographer, director, producer model; dance & choreography Theatre
- Height: 1.73 m (5 ft 8 in)
- Spouse: Guillermo Marín
- Children: 2
- Career
- Dances: Acrobatics & pole dance Revue

Valeria Constanza Archimaut (born January 14, 1972), known as Valeria Archimó, is an Argentine theater dancer, supervedette, choreographer and theater creative director. She is known for participating in many dance competitions, including the Second Dance World Championship in which she ended in 3rd place alongside her dance partner, Juan Leandro Nimo. Archimó is also known for her work and is many times compared with fellow supervedettes, Adabel Guerrero and Mónica Farro.

== Theatre ==
=== 2006–2010: Barbieri, Cherruti, Reech, Guerrero and Farro ===
In early 2007 Archimó, who at the time was still known by her family French name (Archimaut) got signed into the mixed revue and musical comedy, "Irresistible, Otra Historia De Humor", sequel to, "Inolvidable, Una Historia De Humor". She stud as the first vedette of the show, others in the musical where Adabel Guerrero and Sabrina Ravelli, the lead dancers and outstanding vedettes. Sergio Marcos was the head writer, Reina Reech was the creative director and Miguel Ángel Cherruti was the head producer, apart from acting in the theatre magazine. Carmen Barbieri was its lead figure dancing, acting, singing, making monologs and even directing. In 2008 she re-signed to continue with Barbier and Cherruti in their second sequel, "Incomparable, El Humor Continúa", but this time she would work as the head choreographer and not as a figure in the musical. The figures where: Matías Sayágo, Cristian Ponce, Vanina Escudero, Adabel Guerrero, Rodrigo Rodríguez, Diego Reinhold, Celina Rucci, Miguel Ángel Cherutti and led by Carmen Barbieri, directed by Cherruti and Reech. That year she was the first vedette-dancer of "Planeta Show".

Archimaut would later on in 2008 return to work with Guerrero and also with Mónica Farro as the three co-lead first vedettes of the musical "La Fiesta Está En El Lago", led by Florencia De La V and el Negro Álvarez. As always she showed her great acrobatic dance ability in her owned self-choreographed dance numbers and continued in the revue throw all 2009 and continued in the company's sequel, "Y Ahora, La Fiesta Está En El Tabarís". This time she was the single first vedette of the magazine show, being that Farro when to work on Barbieri's alternative revue (still in the same theater company) and later on continuing to work with el Negro Álvarez as his supervedette and her own producer and Guerrero moved to a more classical musical comedy and numerous revue shows being let by her as well as recording music. In 2010 Valeria went to perform in "Gracias A La Villa" alongside a large cast of vedettes, actors, dancers and comedians.

=== 2011–present: Directing & Leading Theater ===
In 2011 and 2012 Archimó was the co-lead vedette alongside María Eugenia Ritó in the revue-musical dance hall, La Revista De Buenos Aires. The shows creative director was Reina Reech and the lead figure was Moria Casán. The other vedettes in the revue where Stefanía Xipolitakis, Andrea Rincon, Lorena Liggi and María Eugenia Bassi and also male dancers, actors and comedians Raúl Lavie, Juan Acosta, Carlos Bernarl and Juan Pablo Bataglia.

In 2012 Valeria signed to star alongside television presenter Jorge Rial, his wife, vedette, actress and model Mariana Loly Antoniale and the great Cacho Castaña in a musical hall theater show that at the moment was still unnamed for the 2012–13 theatrical summer season, produced by her husband Guillermo Marín and due to debut on December 12–15 in the theatre, "La Féliz" in the city of Mar del Plata. She would have four dance numbers choreographed by herself and takes credit as the creative director. On November 17, information about the musical was published indicating that Rial will have a number in which he performs as an astronaut and Antoniale has been excluded from the show. On December 21, after many changes done to the still not debuted musical hall, it was confirmed that the musical debuted that same day and that it was being called, "RIALidad en el City" without the participation of Cacho Castaña, but with the participation of humorist, Claudio Rico and a body of renown dancers: Juan Pablo Bataglia, Vero Pérez, Cristian Ponce, Fran Arriagada, Emilia Chaya, Natalia Franchi, Matías Sayago and Inés Zúnino. The general idea and production of the musical was made by Rial and Archimó.

Year	Musical Show	Role
2001	Fiebre Del Senado Por La Noche	Dancer
2002	Alicia Maravilla	Choreographer
2003	El Principito	Dancer
2004	Pinocho, Un Niño De Verdad	Dancer
2005	Revista Nacional	Dancer
2005–2006	Inolvidable, Una Historia De Humor	Dancer and Vedette
2006	Sweet Charity	1st Dancer
2007	Irresistible, Otra Historia De Humor	1st Vedette; Dancer & Choreographer
2008	Planeta Show	1st Vedette & Dancer
2008	Incomparable, El Humor Continúa	Choreographer
2008–2009	La Fiesta Está En El Lago	Co-Lead Vedette alongside Mónica Farro & Adabel Guerrero; Dancer & Choreographer
2009	Y Ahora, La Fiesta Está En El Tabarís	1st Vedette; Dancer & Choreographer
2010	Gracias A La Villa	1st Vedette; Dancer & Choreographer
2011–2012	La Revista De Buenos Aires	1st Vedette
2013	RIALidad en el City	Directora, Coreógrafa y Figura
2016	Segunda Vuelta	Figura y Bailarina
2016	Che, Tanto Che	Directora, Coreógrafa y Figura
2018	Magnifica	Figura, bailarina y Coreógrafa
2019	Nuevamente Juntos	Figura, Bailarina y Coreógrafa
2020	Únicas, Puertas al amor	Directora, Coreógrafa y Figura
2022	El Cusifai	Figura y Bailarina
2022 - Presente	Sex	Figura y Bailarina

== ShowMatch ==
Archimó first participated in "Bailando..." in 2007 as a simple replacement for model Celina Rucci (the winner of that season) alongside professional dance partner, Matías Sayago.

In 2008 Valeria participated in the fifth season of ShowMatch, hosted by Marcelo Tinelli. She danced alongside professional dancer and model Juan Leandro Nimo with whom she also participated in Bailando por un Sueño: Segundo Campeonato Mundial de Baile. She finished in third place in both competitions. Mónica Farro and Adabel Guerrero both were competitors in the fifth season as well, they finished at eighth place (Farro) and sixth place (Guerrero).

Archimó had a special participation in "El Musical de tus Sueños" in 2009 dancing on doble stripper poles alongside Mónica Farro opening up for the special edition re-entry gala (in which Guerrero entered).

In 2012 she was cast in Bailando 2012 with amputee salsa dancer, Reinaldo Ojeda as her dance partner. Gala after gala tension between Archimó and Ojeda was noticed and was exploited when Archimó was replaced in the fifth round by Guerrero because she had to travel and Ojeda admitted that he was more comfort with Adabel then with Valeria. Valeria returned for the next gala, where she confronted Ojeda after they performed and later on in the media where she decided to quit, being permanently replaced by Guerrero.

In 2021 she returned with Jonathan Lazarte to Showmatch: The Academy but as a replacement for Angela Leiva, who suffered bodily stress. She was only on one gala, pole dance.

== Sources ==
- "Official page of Second Dance World Championship (Spanish)". Televisa. May 9, 2010.
- "Modelos Argentinas: Fotos y Biografia de Valeria Archimó" (in Spanish).
- "Irresistible, Otra historia de humor" (in Spanish).
- "Participantes de Bailando por un Sueño 5 en ShowMatch" (in Spanish). extremista.com.ar. April 8, 2008.
- "Valeria Archimó confirmada para bailando por un sueño 2012" (in Spanish). April 12, 2012.
