= José Ángel Trelles =

Argentine singer (1947–2022)

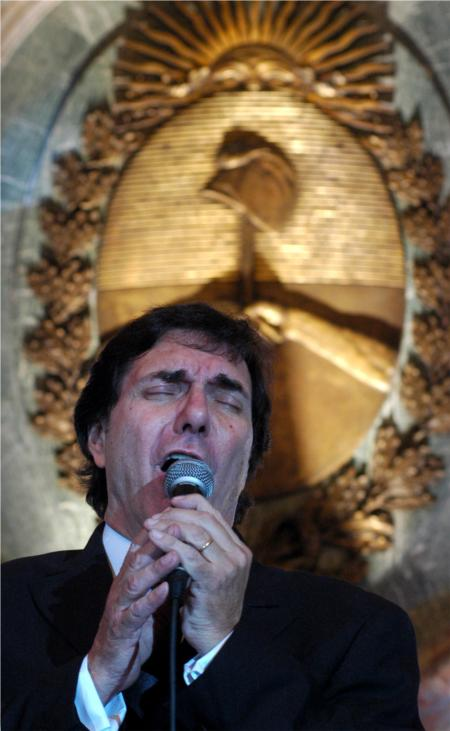
- Trelles in 2006
- Born: José Ángel Amato; 28 August 1944; Buenos Aires, Argentina
- Died: 10 December 2022 (aged 78); Buenos Aires, Argentina
- Occupation: Singer

José Ángel Trelles (born José Ángel Amato; 28 August 1944 – 10 December 2022) was an Argentine singer, composer, and stage actor.

== Life and career ==
Born in Buenos Aires, Trelles became first known in the 1970s thanks to his participation in the musical TV-show Siete y medio and later for winning the musical competition held in the TV-show Canciorena, which got him a contract with the record label RCA. During his career he recorded about two dozen albums and collaborated as a singer and a composer with important artists such as Sandro de América, Victor Heredia, Chico Novarro, Estela Raval, Rubén Juárez, Alberto Cortez, Raúl Lavié. His most important collaboration was with Astor Piazzolla, with whom he toured nationally and abroad as a member of his ensemble Octeto Electrónico, even performing at the Carnegie Hall.

As a stage actor, Trelles got his first success starring in the 1979 musical Aggiungi un posto a tavola; he later played leading roles in numerous stage works, notably co-starring alongside Milva in a successful rendition of the Piazzolla-penned operetta María de Buenos Aires. In 2018 he released a collection of short stories, El Bar de Los Milagros.

Trelles died on 10 December 2022, at the age of 78.
