= Estefanía Bacca =

Argentine vedette, acrobat-dancer, actress, model and choreographer

- Born: 10 September 1988 (age 37); Reconquista, Santa Fe, Argentina
- Education: Antonio Fuentes del Arco; Instituto Universitario Nacional de Arte
- Occupations: Vedette, dancer, acrobat, actress, model, choreographer, singer
- Known for: Premios Carlos 2012; Best Vedette
- Modeling information
- Height: 1.70 m (5 ft 7 in)
- Hair color: Blonde
- Eye color: Brown – green
- Website: twitter.com/EstefiBacca

Estefanía Bacca is an Argentine vedette, acrobat-dancer, actress, model and choreographer. She received her licence as dance instructor (specialist in musical comedy) in Instituto Universitario Nacional de Arte in Buenos Aires. She has modeled for Paparazzi Online and Maxim in Argentina.

== Career ==
| Year | Theatrical Show | Notes |
|---|---|---|
| 2007–2008 | Incomparable | Dancer and Actress |
| 2008–2009 | Vedettísima | Outstanding Dancer Half Vedette |
| 2009–2010 | Fantástica | Half Vedette 2nd Actress and 1st Dancer |
| 2010–2012 | Excitante | 2nd Vedette Acrobat-Dancer and Actress |
| 2011–2012 | El Anfitrión | 2nd Vedette Acrobat-Dancer |
| 2012–2013 | Sin Comerla ni Beberla | Supporting Actress |
| 2013-2014 | Divain | 1st Vedette Lead Dancer & Actress |
| 2015 | 50 Sombras! El Musical | |

Estefanía started her theater career as a small role actress and simple burlesque dancer in revue shows from 2007 and 2010, all in the same company, "Faroni Producciones" of actress-comedian and director Carmen Barbieri and producer and founder of the company, Javier Faroni.

In late-2010 Bacca was cast in the revue musical Excitante as the second vedette bested by Adabel Guerrero and Jésica Cirio in Mar del Plata. Estefanía was the second vedette on the magazine play El Anfitrión for the 2011–12 theatrical season in Villa Carlos Paz. The musical was led by María Martha Serra Lima as the lead attraction and Mónica González Listorti as the first vedette accompanied by her Bailando professional dance partner Maximiliano D'Iorio as the first dancer. The show's creative director was the Austrian vedette, Reina Reech. Also in the show as the actor-comedian, "Cacho" Buenaventura and the magician, Emanuel. The musical debuted in Córdoba, Argentina, 16 December 2011 in the theater, Candilejas I. Bacca won an award for best vedette, for her work in El Anfitrión.

She performed part of a non-musical theater comedy, Sin Comerla ni Beberla alongside René Bertrand, Sabrina Olmedo, Emiliano Rella, Belén Giménez, Pamela Sosa and Leandro Orowitz, directed by René Bertrand and produced-writing by Gerardo Sofovich in Mar del Plata. They debuted on 28 December 2012 in the theater Re Fa Si. Currently, Bacca is the lead vedette of the music hall, "Divain" in Mar del Plata, Argentina alongside Aníbal Pachano, Gustavo Wons, Maia Contreras, Nicolás Armengol and others. The theater show received six nomination including two for female revelations, one being for Estefanía.

== See also ==
- List of glamour models

== Sources ==
- Da Silva Villarrubia, Santiago Katriél (18 January 2012). "Estefanía Bacca no quiere escándalos". by Gustavo Anzani (in Spanish). El Liberal. Archived from the original on 6 January 2014.
