= Celebrity Splash! (Argentine TV series) =

- Country of origin: Argentina
- No. of episodes: 12

Original release
- Network: Telefe
- Release: 11 June – 2 September 2013

Celebrity Splash! is a reality television show which teaches celebrities the art of diving. The first series is featured to start on 11 June 2013, and it will be broadcast by Telefe. Marley Wiebe will be hosting the show, with Pampita Ardohain, Maximiliano Guerra, Miguel Ángel Rodríguez and Mariana Montes as judges.

== Origins and history ==
Splash has its origin and idea from German TV Olympic-themed variety show TV Total Turmspringen (TV Total Diving), it was first aired on 16 December 2004, in the TV total slot, on ProSieben and was founded by Stefan Raab and hosted by Sonya Kraus. Other hosts/reporters include Ingolf Lück (2004), Kai Pflaume (2005), Oliver Welke and Matthias Opdenhövel (2007, 09), Steven Gätjen (2011–12) and Olaf Schubert (2011–12 reporter).

It has been held every year since, with the exception of 2006. The eighth competition was on 24 November 2012 re-fought at the Olympic Pool, Munich.

The idea for the German show has been adopted by US network FOX and aired as a two-hour special, renamed Stars in Danger: The High Dive, on 9 January 2013. Fox's rival show is the American version of Splash, which airs on ABC since March 2013.

Both shows are similar in concept to the Netherlands-born Splash reality show format, which launched in August 2012 and is now produced in at least 10 other countries.

== Contestants ==
Celebrity	Known for	Status
Pía Slapka	Model & TV hostess	Eliminated in Round 1 – Part 1
Silvia Pérez	Actress	Eliminated in Round 1 – Part 1
Gastón Soffritti	Actor	Eliminated in Round 1 – Part 2
Belén Francese	Model, Actress & Comedian	Eliminated in Round 1 – Part 3
Micaela Breque	Model	Eliminated in Round 1 – Part 3
Silvina Luna	Model & Actress	Eliminated in Round 1 – Part 4
Claudia Albertario	Former Model & Actress	Eliminated in Round 2 – Part 1
Federico Amador	Actor	Eliminated in Round 2 – Part 1
Gladys Florimonte	Actress & Comedian	Eliminated in Round 1 – Part 4
Gladys Florimonte	Actress & Comedian	Eliminated in Round 2 – Part 2
Georgina Barbarossa	Actress & Comedian	Eliminated in Round 2 – Part 2
Ariel Ortega	Retired football attacking midfielder	Eliminated in Round 2 – Part 3
Carolina Duer	Female boxer	Eliminated in Round 2 – Part 3
Polaco Cwirkaluk	Cumbia Singer	Eliminated in Round 1 – Part 2
Polaco Cwirkaluk	Cumbia Singer	Eliminated in quarter-finals 1
Tota Santillán	TV Host	Eliminated in quarter-finals 2
Andrea Ghidone	Dancer & Vedette	Eliminated in quarter-finals 2
Andrea Ghidone	Dancer & Vedette	Eliminated in Semi-finals 1
Leandro Penna	Model and Reality TV star	Eliminated in quarter-finals 1
Leandro Penna	Model and Reality TV star	Eliminated in Semi-finals 2
Virginia da Cunha	Singer-songwriter & Actress	Eliminated in Semi-finals 2
Pichu Straneo	Comedian & Actor	7th place
Silvio Velo	Paralympic national football team captain	6th place
Noelia Marzol	Actress & Dancer	5th place
Sergio Goycochea	Former football goalkeeper & Model	4th place
Martín Buzzo	Fuerzabruta leader	3rd place
Ximena Capristo	Former Vedette & Actress	Runners-up
Nazareno Móttola	Actor & Comedian	Winner

== Scoring chart ==
Celebrity	Place	Round 1				Round 2			Q		S		F	Result
Celebrity	Place	1	2	3	4	5	6	7	8	9	10	11	12	Result
Nazareno	1		9.3					8.7		9.4		9.8	8.1	Winner
Ximena	2	8.3				8.3				8.4		7.7	7.5	Runner-up
Martín	3				9.0		8.0			8.9	8.6		7.3	3rd place
Sergio	4			7.4				7.7		6.5	7.7		7.4	4th place
Noelia	5			9.3			8.0		7.4		6.8		6.9	5th place
Silvio	6			9.3		7.8			7.9			8.5	6.6	6th place
Pichu	7	8.4				8.5			7.9		8.5		5.8	7th place
Virginia	10–8		6.0					8.7	6.7			6.5		
Leandro	10–8	6.0				8.5			5.4			7.0		
Andrea	10–8		7.4					5.8		5.5	6.4			
Tota	12–11				6.7		6.4			6.5				
Polaco	12–11		6.7				6.4		5.8					
Ariel	18–13				8.3			7.7						
Carolina	18–13				6.5			5.8						
Georgina	18–13		8.4				7.8							
Gladys	18–13				7.0		7.8							
Federico	18–13	7.8				8.3								
Claudia	18–13			5.9		7.8								
Silvina	19–24				5.7									
Micaela	19–24			5.9										
Belén	19–24			5.2										
Gastón	19–24		6.8											
Silvia	19–24	6.9												
Pía	19–24	6.5												

Red numbers indicate the lowest score for each week
Green numbers indicate the highest score for each week
The diver won the competition.
The diver received second place in the competition.
The diver received third place in the competition.
The diver received fourth, fifth, sixth and seventh place in the competition.
The diver received first place that week, when audience scores were added in.
The diver was in the bottom of the night and competed in the dive-off.
The diver was eliminated that week.
The diver did not dive that week.
