= Albertario =

Albertario is a surname. Notable people with the surname include:

- Agustina Albertario (born 1993), Argentine field hockey player
- Claudia Albertario (born 1977), Argentine model, vedette, and actress
