= Cantando (disambiguation) =

Cantando is a 1982 jazz album by Bobo Swenson.

Cantando may also refer to:

== Music ==
- Cantando, 1984 album by Diomedes Díaz
- Cantando, 1991 album by Cheo Feliciano
- Cantando, 2004 album by Toto Cutugno
- Cantando, 2016 EP by Dom La Nena

== Television ==
- Cantando 2011, the third season of Cantando por un Sueño
- Cantando 2012, the fourth season of Cantando por un Sueño

== See also ==
- Cantabile, a particular style of playing designed to imitate the human voice
