= Virginia Dobrich =

Uruguayan dancer, actress, model and cabaret entertainer

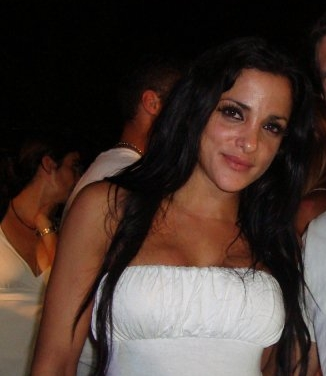
- Virginia Dobrich in 2011.
- Born: Virginia Dobrich; December 8, 1978 (age 47); Uruguay
- Occupations: dancer, actress, model, cabaret star and vedette

Virginia Dobrich (born 8 December 1978) is a Uruguayan dancer and occasional actress, model and cabaret entertainer. In 2012 she debuted as a theatre vedette in the Argentinian revue, Excitante. She is known for her work both in Argentina and Uruguay.

== Career ==
Dobrich began her career as a dancer in Argentina in Bailando por un sueño 2008, as the professional dance partner of La Tota Santillán. They were the 31st pair eliminated of 39 contestants in the competition.

In early 2009 she worked on Bendito total with Tota Santillán.

In 2009 she was recruited by producer Marcelo Tinelli to form part of El Musical de tus Sueños as the dancer for Dallys Ferreira. In that year she performed in Villa Carlos Paz in a theater production of Carnaval de estrellas with Valeria Lynch, Raúl Lavié, Jésica Cirio, and Martin Campilongo.

In 2010 she was cast by journalist Luis Ventura in Uruguay for a program called The City, which aired for a few months.

In late 2010 she was cast in the theater show Excitante with Nito Artaza and Miguel Ángel Cherutti in Argentina. The musical was presented in Mar del Plata, and finished in its fourth musical cycle after the death of its lead, Estela Raval. Dobrich was the first dancer as well as a vedette.

Dobrich works in Uruguay as a model for the magazine v12.

== Television ==
- 2008, Bailando por un sueño 2008, professional dance partner of Tota Santillán.
- 2009, El musical de tus sueños, professional dance partner of Dallys Ferreira alongside Julián Andrés Carbajal, Andrés Espinel, Adrian Juan and Belén Alonso.
- 2011, "Locos del tomate". Special participation.

== Theatre ==
Year	Show	Notes
2009	Bendito Total	
2009	Carnaval de estrellas	
2010–2012	Excitante	1st Dancer, Half Vedette
