= Lucía Maciel =

Argentine actress

Lucía Maciel (Spanish pronunciation: [luˈsi.a maˈsjel]; born c. 1970) is an Argentine actress and television reporter. She works for what is arguably Argentina's largest television network, Telefé.

== Biography ==
As an actress, Maciel debuted with an extra role as a servant in 2003's Resistiré, which was renamed in English to Forever Julia.

It wasn't long before she was able to find a job as a recurrent character. During 2004, she was hired to play Pepa Kathy in her second telenovela, named El Deseo (The Desire). Although El Deseo was not as large a hit as Resistiré, it helped Maciel's career by making her a familiar figure among Argentine television viewers.

Maciel then debuted as a television reporter in a show named Camara en Mano (Handheld Camera) during 2005. In Camara en Mano, she and a number of other reporters visit celebrities, both national and international, often by surprise, and with a handheld camera, as the show's title suggests. More often than not, Maciel's (as well as the other reporters') interviews to celebrities are mixed with both serious and funny questions.

As reporter for Camara en Mano, Maciel has covered many different topics, such as karate, women's boxing, and Argentina's version of the Oscar awards, the Ace awards. She managed to spot and interview the international singer, Sandro, as he was about to get into his private swimming pool, and she has also interviewed Marcela Acuna and Facundo Arana, among many others.

Maciel also voices Laura in the film Underdogs.

== See also ==
- List of Argentines
