= David Forrest (pseudonym) =

Pseudonym of novelist duo

David Forrest is a pen-name used by English novelists Robert Forrest-Webb (9 April 1929 – 23 April 2023) and David Eliades (born 1933) to write four books, And to My Nephew Albert I Leave the Island What I Won off Fatty Hagan in a Poker Game (1969), The Great Dinosaur Robbery (1970), After Me, the Deluge (1972), and The Undertaker's Dozen (1974). These books featured tight plotlines and riotous humor, touching at the same time some serious topics: The Great Dinosaur Robbery and Nephew deal with the Cold War, After Me, the Deluge with religion.

After Me, the Deluge was interpreted into the lavish stage musical Aggiungi un Posto a Tavola by the Italian impresarios Pietro Garinei, Sandro Giovannini and Iaia Fiastri in 1974 and has been running in Italy for over 44 years. It is firmly entrenched as a family favourite and is reported to have been seen by more than 15-million people. Its English version, Beyond the Rainbow, ran at the Adelphi Theatre, London, for two years during the late 1970s. It has also broken box-office records in the whole of Latin America and in Spain, Austria, Germany, Russia and Hungary. The Great Dinosaur Robbery became a Disney movie, One of Our Dinosaurs Is Missing (1975), which was also highly considered in its time. All these books are published by Hodder & Stoughton and are currently available online as e-books.
