= Cantando 2012 =

Fourth season of the Argentine TV series Cantando por un Sueño

- Directed by: Alejandro Ripoll
- Presented by: José María Listorti
- Country of origin: Argentina
- Original language: Spanish

Production
- Running time: 70 mins. (approx.)

Original release
- Network: El Trece
- Release: May 12, 2012 – present

Related
- Cantando 2011

Cantando 2012 is the fourth season of Cantando por un Sueño and was premiered on El Trece, in May 2012. The list of contestants and dreamers was closed with a total of 18 pairs, two of them composed by two celebrities. At this moment, is the season with the most celebrities competing for the title, and the first season of Cantando por un Sueño that featured a couple composed by two women.

The show is presented by the Argentinian host José María Listorti, and this is the first time, he is presenting the show alone, after presenting Cantando 2011 with Denise Dumas.

The judges for this season are singer Valeria Lynch, music producer Óscar Mediavilla, journalist Marcelo Polino, and the famous Argentine duet, Pimpinela, composed by Joaquín and Lucía Galán.

== Couples ==
Celebrity	Occupation	Professional Partner	Status
Claudia Albertario	Model & Actress	Cristian Fontán	Eliminated 1st by the 43.56%
Cecilia "Chechu" Bonelli	Model & Journalist	Javier Bazán	Eliminated 2nd by the 41.22%
Alejandra Maglietti	Model & Television Presenter	Bruno Ragone	Eliminated 3rd by the 42.89%
Constanza "Connie" Ansaldi	journalist	Cristian Centurión	Eliminated 4th by the 26.39%
Vanina Escudero	Model & Dancer	Sergio Martínez	Eliminated 5th by the 34.49%
Yanina Iglesias	Singer, Dancer & Actress	Augusto Buccafusco	Eliminated 6th by the 43.85%
Geraldine Neumann	model	Lucas Martín	Eliminated 7th by the 40.96%
Jorge Ibáñez	Fashion Designer	Mavi Toledo	Eliminated 8th by the 45.33%
Adabel Guerrero	Dancer	Nicolás Martinelli	Eliminated 9th by the 41.85%
Osmar "Cau" Bornes	Singer	Mechi Pieretti	Eliminated 10th by the 44.10%
Camilo García	journalist	Nadia Robledo	Eliminated 11th by the 46.11%
Carlos Sánchez	comedian	Flavia Pereda	Eliminated 12th by the 40.62%
Soledad Cescato	Playboy Playmate	Andrea López	Eliminated 13th by the 47.95%
Belén Francese	Model & Comedian	Nicolás Martinelli	Eliminated 14th by the 46.11%
Daniel "Tota" Santillán	Former TV Host	Mavi Toledo	Eliminated 15th by the 43.88%
Camilo García	journalist	Nadia Robledo	Eliminated 16th by the 48.78%
Yanina Iglesias	Singer, Dancer & Actress	Augusto Buccafusco	Eliminated 17th by the 47.33%
Soledad Cescato	Playboy Playmate	Andrea López	Eliminated 18th by the 31.97%
Iliana Calabró	actress, Comedian & Vedette	Gastón Madariaga	Eliminated 19th by the 32.00%
Alfonso "Chiqui" Abecasis	comedian	Irina Abecasis	Semi-finalists by the 43.66%
Marcelo Iripino	Choreographer & Dancer	Indira Aprile	Semi-finalists by the 41.17%
Silvina Escudero	Model & Dancer	Sebastián Vitale	Runners-up by the 44.77%
Fabio "Mole" Moli	Boxer	Natalie Scalzadonna	Winners by the 54.23%

- In the thirteenth week, there was a repechage, and the following couples came back into the competition:
  - Yanina Iglesias & Augusto Buccafusco
  - Camilo García & Nadia Robledo
  - Soledad Cescato & Andrea López
  - Belén France (Adabel Guerrero's replacement) & Nicolás Martinelli
  - Daniel "Tota" Santillán (Jorge Ibañez's replacement) & Mavi Toledo

== Scoring chart ==
Celebrity	Place																						
Celebrity	Place	01	02	03	04	05	06	07	08	09	10	11	12	13	14	15	16	17	SF		F		
Celebrity	Place	01	02	03	04	05	06	07	08	09	10	11	12	13	14	15	16	17	1	2	F		
Celebrity	Place	Mole	1	28	27	24	–^{[1]}	–^{[2]}	–^{[2]}	19	25	35	29	26	39	29	32	33	47	–^{[3]}		3	3
Silvina	2	33	29	41	–^{[1]}	–^{[2]}	–^{[2]}	29	42	34	45	36	34	47	45	45	42	–^{[3]}	3		2		
Marcelo	3	36	44	36	–^{[1]}	–^{[2]}	–^{[2]}	31	40	43	47	40	38	47	42	46	47	–^{[3]}		2			
Chiqui	3	38	36	36	–^{[1]}	–^{[2]}	–^{[2]}	22	39	42	44	38	39	48	48	43	48	–^{[3]}	1				
Iliana	5	30	32	39	–^{[1]}	–^{[2]}	–^{[2]}	29	35	34	40	35	39	42	42	45	35	–^{[3]}					
Soledad & Andrea	11 / 6	29	37	38	–^{[1]}	–^{[2]}	–^{[2]}	25	33	35	37	37	33	46	44	45	45	–^{[3]}					
Yanina & Augusto	18 / 7	37	37	37	–^{[1]}	–^{[2]}								37	40	44	38						
Camilo	13 / 8	34	36	33	–^{[1]}	–^{[2]}	–^{[2]}	31	41	43	34			40	40	39							
Tota	9													46	34								
Belén	10													24									
Carlos	12	39	36	42	–^{[1]}	–^{[2]}	–^{[2]}	29	46	46	45	33											
Cau	14	35	32	36	–^{[1]}	–^{[2]}	–^{[2]}	26	38	34													
Adabel	15	36	35	28	–^{[1]}	–^{[2]}	–^{[2]}	33	31														
Jorge	16	25	34	33	–^{[1]}	–^{[2]}	–^{[2]}	25															
Geraldine	17	25	33	28	–^{[1]}	–^{[2]}	–^{[2]}																
Vanina	19	30	35	33	–^{[1]}																		
Connie	20	30	33	28	–^{[1]}																		
Alejandra	21	19	27	22																			
Chechu	22	30	23																				
Claudia	23	21																					

Red numbers indicate the lowest score for each week.
Green numbers indicate the highest score for each week.
indicates the couple eliminated that week.
indicates the couple was saved by the public.
indicates the couple was saved by the jury.
indicates the winning couple.
indicates the runner-up couple.
indicates the semi-finalists couples.

- ^[1] During this round, all the couples sang in a duel. The judges did not score the performance, instead, they saved 12 couples, and the other 3 went to the public vote. 2 couples were eliminated.
- ^[2] During this round, all the couples sang in a duel. The judges did not score the performance, instead, they saved some couples, leaving 2 that went to the public vote. 1 couple was eliminated.

== Weekly scores and songs ==
=== Round 1 ===
- Unless indicated otherwise, individual judges scores in the charts below (given in parentheses) are listed in this order from left to right: Joaquín Galán, Lucía Galán, Óscar Mediavilla, Marcelo Polino, Valeria Lynch. Also, the secret vote, is in **bold**.

Key
– The couple was saved by the judges
– The couple was saved by the public vote
– The couple was eliminated

Running order

Date	Couple	Score	Song (original artist)
May 13	Silvina & Sebastián	33 (8,7,**6**,5,7)	"Usted" (Diego Torres)
May 13	Marcelo & Indira	36 (7,9,**7**,4,9)	"Fuiste Tú" (Ricardo Arjona)
May 13	Geraldine & Lucas	25 (6,6,**4**,3,6)	"Lloviendo Estrellas" (Cristian Castro)
May 13	Jorge & Mavi	25 (5,6,**3**,4,7)	"Más" (Ricky Martin)
May 13	Adabel & Nicolás	36 (9,8,**6**,5,8)	"Tan Sólo Tú" (Franco De Vita)
May 13	Chiqui & Irina	38 (9,9,**7**,5,8)	"Regresa A Mí" (Il Divo)
May 13	Cau & Mechi	35 (8,8,**6**,5,8)	"Vivo por Ella" (Andrea Bocelli & Tammi Terrell)
May 13	Claudia & Cristian	21 (6,5,**2**,3,5)	"Fría Como el Viento" (Luis Miguel)
May 20	Iliana & Gastón	30 (7,7,**5**,4,7)	"Una y otra vez" (Marcela Morelo)
May 20	Fabio & Natalie	28 (7,7,**8**,3,6)	"Mi Historia Entre Tus Dedos" (Eros Ramazzotti)
May 20	Vanina & Sergio	30 (7,7,**5**,4,7)	"Paisaje" (Vicentico)
May 20	Chechu & Javier	30 (7,7,**5**,4,7)	"Fue amor" (Fabiana Cantilo)
May 20	Carlos & Flavia	39 (10,9,**7**,5,8)	"Dígale" (David Bisbal)
May 20	Yanina & Augusto	37 (9,8,**7**,5,8)	"Estoy enamorada" (Thalía)
May 20	Camilo & Nadia	34 (8,7,**7**,4,8)	"Always on My Mind" (Elvis Presley)
May 27	Connie & Cristian	30 (7,7,**5**,4,7)	"La Isla Bonita" (Madonna)
May 27	Soledad & Andrea	29 (8,7,**5**,3,6)	"Tratame suavemente" (Soda Stereo)
May 27	Alejandra & Bruno	19 (6,5,**2**,1,5)	"Nada Es Para Siempre" (Fabiana Cantilo)

=== Round 2 ===
Running order

Date	Couple	Score	Song (original artist)
June 3	Iliana & Gastón	32 (7,**7**,7,4,7)	"Mi Tierra" (Gloria Estefan)
June 3	Fabio & Natalie	27 (7,**5**,6,3,6)	"Resistiré" (David Bolzoni)
June 3	Adabel & Nicolás	35 (8,**8**,8,3,8)	"Vivir lo Nuestro" (Marc Anthony)
June 3	Cau & Mechi	32 (7,**7**,7,4,7)	"Las Puertas Del Cielo" (Donato y Estefano)
June 3	Chiqui & Irina	36 (8,**9**,7,5,7)	"Celebra la Vida" (Axel)
June 3	Geraldine & Lucas	33 (8,**7**,7,4,7)	"I Don't Want to Miss a Thing" (Aerosmith)
June 10	Vanina & Sergio	35 (8,**7**,8,4,8)	"Costumbres Argentinas" (Los Abuelos de la Nada)
June 10	Alejandra & Bruno	27 (7,**6**,6,2,6)	"Te amo" (Franco De Vita)
June 10	Carlos & Flavia	36 (9,**8**,8,3,8)	"Llueve sobre mojado" (Fito Páez)
June 10	Yanina & Augusto	37 (7,**8**,9,5,8)	"Noviembre Sin Tí" (Reik)
June 10	Soledad & Andrea	37 (8,**8**,8,5,8)	"La extraña dama" (Valeria Lynch)
June 10	Camilo & Nadia	36 (8,**9**,8,4,7)	"Un beso y una flor" (Nino Bravo)
June 17	Chechu & Javier	23 (7,**6**,3,2,5)	"Rezo por vos" (Charly García & Luis Alberto Spinetta)
June 17	Silvina & Sebastián	29 (8,**7**,5,4,5)	"Olvídate y pega la vuelta" (Pimpinela)
June 17	Jorge & Mavi	34 (7,**8**,6,6,7)	"Torero" (Chayanne)
June 17	Connie & Cristian	33 (8,**8**,6,5,6)	"Ella" (Tan Biónica)
June 17	Marcelo & Indira	44 (10,**9**,8,8,9)	"Labios Compartidos" (Maná)

=== Round 3 ===
Running order

Date	Couple	Score	Song (original artist)
June 24	Adabel & Nicolás	28 (**6**,7,6,3,6)	"Looking for Paradise" (Alicia Keys & Alejandro Sanz)
June 24	Geraldine & Lucas	28 (**7**,7,5,3,6)	"Tú" (Shakira)
July 1	Camilo & Nadia	33 (**8**,8,7,4,6)	"840" (Rodrigo Bueno)
July 1	Yanina & Augusto	37 (**8**,7,8,6,8)	"Herederos" (David Bisbal)
July 1	Connie & Cristian	28 (**7**,7,5,2,7)	"Poker Face" (Lady Gaga)
July 1	Jorge & Mavi	33 (**7**,7,8,3,8)	"Experiencia Religiosa" (Enrique Iglesias)
July 1	Marcelo & Indira	36 (**9**,8,6,4,9)	"Hoy tengo ganas de ti" (Ricardo Montaner)
July 1	Silvina & Sebastián	41 (**9**,9,9,6,8)	"Me haces tanto bien" (Amistades Peligrosas)
July 1	Vanina & Sergio	33 (**8**,8,7,4,6)	"Thelma y Louise" (Fito Páez)
July 1	Cau & Mechi	36 (**8**,8,6,5,9)	"Cosas de la vida" (Eros Ramazzotti)
July 8	Iliana & Gastón	39 (**8**,8,6,10,7)	"¿Dónde están los hombres?" (Pimpinela)
July 8	Chiqui & Irina	36 (**9**,9,6,5,7)	"Sólo un momento" (Vicentico)
July 8	Alejandra & Bruno	22 (**6**,5,3,2,6)	"No me arrepiento de este amor" (Gilda)
July 8	Soledad & Andrea	38 (**8**,9,7,5,9)	"Beautiful" (Christina Aguilera)
July 8	Fabio & Natalie	24 (**7**,6,4,1,6)	"Dime que no" (Ricardo Arjona)
July 8	Carlos & Flavia	42 (**9**,10,8,5,10)	"Si nos dejan" (Luis Miguel)

=== Round 4 ===
Running order

Date	Couple	Song (original artist)
July 15	Iliana & Gastón	"Volare" (Gipsy Kings)
July 15	Geraldine & Lucas	"One" (U2)
July 15	Chiqui & Irina	"¿Dónde Están Corazón?" (Enrique Iglesias & Coti)
July 15	Yanina & Augusto	"Lo mejor de mi vida eres tú" (Ricky Martin & Natalia Giménez)
July 15	Soledad & Andrea	"Antes de las Seis" (Shakira)
July 15	Cau & Mechi	"Ai se eu te pego!" (Michel Teló)
July 15	Adabel & Nicolás	"Por Amarte Así" (Cristian Castro & Ana Isabelle)
July 15	Silvina & Sebastián	"Ahora te puedes marchar" (Luis Miguel)
July 15	Vanina & Sergio	"Un mundo ideal" (Ricardo Montaner)
July 15	Marcelo & Indira	"Hasta que me olvides" (Luis Miguel)
July 15	Camilo & Nadia	"Spaghetti del rock" (Divididos)
July 15	Connie & Cristian	"Rehab" (Amy Winehouse)
July 15	Jorge & Mavi	"Dame fuego" (Sandro de América)
July 15	Carlos & Flavia	"Quiéreme" (Jean Carlos)
July 15	Fabio & Natalie	"Auto rojo" (Vilma Palma e Vampiros)

=== Round 5 ===
Running order

Date	Couple	Song (original artist)
July 22	Carlos & Flavia	"Corazón Partío" (Alejandro Sanz)
July 22	Geraldine & Lucas	"Mary Poppins y el deshollinador" (Fabiana Cantilo)
July 22	Chiqui & Irina	"Volver a empezar" (Alejandro Lerner)
July 22	Yanina & Augusto	"Inolvidable" (Laura Pausini)
July 22	Soledad & Andrea	"Someone like You" (Adele)
July 22	Iliana & Gastón	"Libre" (Nino Bravo)
July 22	Fabio & Natalie	"Por lo que yo te quiero" (Rodrigo)
July 22	Silvina & Sebastián	"Corre" (Jesse y Joy)
July 22	Adabel & Nicolás	"Ven conmigo" (Christina Aguilera)
July 22	Marcelo & Indira	"Volver" (Ricardo Montaner)
July 22	Cau & Mechi	"Capullito de alelí"(Caetano Veloso)
July 22	Jorge & Mavi	"Ave María"(David Bisbal)
July 22	Camilo & Nadia	"Un osito de peluche de Taiwán"(Los Auténticos Decadentes)

=== Round 6 ===
Running order

Date	Couple	Song (original artist)
July 29	Camilo & Nadia	"Tira para arriba" (Miguel Mateos)
July 29	Geraldine & Lucas	"Me estás atrapando otra vez" (Andrés Calamaro)
July 29	Cau & Mechi	"Beso a beso" (La Mona Jiménez)
July 29	Chiqui & Irina	"La flor más bella" (Memphis La Blusera)
July 29	Carlos & Flavia	"Te conozco" (Ricardo Arjona)
July 29	Iliana & Gastón	"Fiesta" (Rafaela Carrá)
July 29	Soledad & Andrea	"Desesperada" (Marta Sánchez)
July 29	Silvina & Sebastián	"La Tortura" (Shakira & Alejandro Sanz)
July 29	Adabel & Nicolás	"Vivir sin aire" (Maná)
July 29	Marcelo & Indira	"Persiana americana" (Gustavo Cerati)
July 29	Jorge & Mavi	"Te quiero tanto" (Sergio Denis)
July 29	Fabio & Natalie	"Un siglo sin ti" (Chayanne)

=== Round 7 ===
Running order

Date	Couple	Score	Song (original artist)
August 5	Iliana & Gastón	29 (7,**6**,9,7)	"La vida es un carnaval" (Celia Cruz)
August 5	Soledad & Andrea	25 (7,**7**,4,7)	"Yo No Soy Esa Mujer" (Paulina Rubio)
August 5	Adabel & Nicolás	33 (8,**7**,10,8)	"Amor a la Mexicana" (Thalía)
August 5	Marcelo & Indira	31 (9,**8**,5,9)	"Soy feliz" (Ricardo Montaner)
August 5	Carlos & Flavia	29 (8,**8**,5,8)	"Juntos a la par" (Pappo)
August 5	Fabio & Natalie	19 (6,**5**,2,6)	"Sólo importas tú" (Franco De Vita)
August 5	Chiqui & Irina	22 (6,**7**,3,6)	"Heróe" (Il Divo)
August 5	Jorge & Mavi	25 (8,**6**,3,8)	"Será que no me amas" (Luis Miguel)
August 19	Camilo & Nadia	31 (9,**8**,6,8)	"Loco un poco" (Turf)
August 19	Cau & Mechi	26 (8,**7**,3,8)	"Provócame" (Chayanne)
August 19	Silvina & Sebastián	29 (8,**7**,6,8)	"Like a Virgin" (Madonna)

=== Round 8 ===
Running order

Date	Couple	Score	Song (original artist)
August 26	Marcelo & Indira	40 (9,9,8,6,**8**)	"Asignatura Pendiente" (Ricky Martin)
August 26	Adabel & Nicolás	31 (7,7,6,4,**7**)	"No Me Ames" (Jennifer Lopez & Marc Anthony)
August 26	Fabio & Natalie	25 (6,6,5,2,**6**)	"No podrás" (Cristian Castro)
August 26	Carlos & Flavia	46 (10,9,9,8,**10**)	"Si Tú Te Vas" (Enrique Iglesias)
August 26	Soledad & Andrea	33 (8,7,7,4,**7**)	"Ojos Así" (Shakira)
September 2	Iliana & Gastón	35 (8,8,7,5,**7**)	"Color Esperanza" (Diego Torres)
September 2	Chiqui & Indira	39 (9,10,7,5,**8**)	"A Puro Dolor" (Son By Four)
September 2	Cau & Mechi	38 (9,8,7,5,**9**)	"Adonde quiera que estés" (Manuel Wirtz)
September 2	Camilo & Nadia	41 (8,8,7,10,**8**)	"Ya no quiero volverme tan loco" (Charly García)
September 2	Silvina & Sebastián	42 (10,9,7,7,**9**)	"Doctor Psiquiatra" (Gloria Trevi)

=== Round 9 ===
Running order

Date	Couple	Score	Song (original artist)
September 9	Iliana & Gastón	34 (**8**,7,7,5,7)	"Baila conmigo" (Valeria Lynch)
September 9	Chiqui & Irina	42 (**9**,9,9,6,9)	"Y nos dieron las diez" (Joaquín Sabina)
September 9	Camilo & Nadia	43 (**9**,9,8,9,8)	"Sin gamulán" (Los Abuelos de la Nada)
September 9	Marcelo & Indira	43 (**10**,9,9,5,10)	"Amor Gitano" (Alejandro Fernández & Beyoncé)
September 9	Soledad & Andrea	35 (**8**,9,7,3,8)	"I Will Always Love You" (Whitney Houston)
September 9	Cau & Mechi	34 (**8**,7,7,4,8)	"Inundados" (Os Paralamas do Sucesso)
September 16	Carlos & Flavia	46 (**10**,9,9,9,9)	"Vasos vacíos" (Los Fabulosos Cadillacs)
September 16	Fabio & Natalie	35 (**8**,8,7,6,6)	"A Dios le Pido" (Juanes)
September 16	Silvina & Sebastián	34 (**8**,7,7,6,6)	"The Time of My Life" (Bill Medley & Jennifer Warnes)

=== Round 10 ===
Running order

Date	Couple	Score	Song (original artist)
September 16	Camilo & Nadia	34 (8,**8**,7,4,7)	"Irresponsables" (Babasónicos)
September 16	Marcelo & Indira	47 (10,**10**,9,8,10)	"Fuego de Noche, Nieve de Día" (Ricky Martin)
September 23	Iliana & Gastón	40 (8,**8**,7,8,9)	"Tu veneno" (Natalia Oreiro)
September 23	Chiqui & Irina	44 (9,**9**,9,9,8)	"Soy cordobés" (Rodrigo Bueno)
September 23	Carlos & Flavia	46 (9,**9**,9,9,10)	"Corazón Espinado" (Maná)
September 23	Silvina & Sebastián	45 (9,**10**,9,8,9)	"Aprender a volar" (Patricia Sosa)
September 23	Soledad & Andrea	37 (8,**8**,7,5,9)	"Entra En Mi Vida" (Sin Bandera)
September 23	Fabio & Natalie	29 (6,**6**,6,4,7)	"Vuelve" (Ricky Martin)

=== Round 11 ===
Running order

Date	Couple	Score	Song (original artist)
September 30	Marcelo & Indira	40 (10,10,**10**,10)	"Tratar de Estar Mejor" (Diego Torres)
September 30	Iliana & Gastón	35 (9,10,**8**,8)	"Sólo se vive una vez" (Azúcar Moreno)
September 30	Chiqui & Irina	38 (9,10,**10**,9)	"Algo contigo" (Vicentico)
September 30	Carlos & Flavia	33 (9,9,**8**,7)	"Bulería" (David Bisbal)
September 30	Silvina & Sebastián	36 (9,9,**9**,9)	"La pollera amarilla" (Gladys la Bomba Tucumana)
September 30	Soledad & Andrea	37 (10,10,**9**,8)	"Para estar mejor" (Viudas e Hijas)
September 30	Fabio & Natalie	26 (8,8,**7**,3)	"Historia de taxi" (Ricardo Arjona)

=== Round 12 ===
Running order

Date	Couple	Score	Song (original artist)
October 7	Soledad & Andrea	33 (9,**8**,8,8)	"Hoy" (Gloria Estefan)
October 7	Iliana & Gastón	39 (10,**10**,9,10)	"Lollipop" (Viudad e Hijas)
October 7	Marcelo & Indira	38 (10,**10**,10,8)	"Dejáme llorar" (Ricardo Montaner)
October 7	Chiqui & Irina	39 (10,**10**,10,9)	"El amor no se puede olvidar" (Pimpinela)
October 7	Silvina & Sebastián	34 (9,**9**,7,9)	"El amor después del amor" (Fito Páez)
October 7	Fabio & Natalie	39 (10,**10**,9,10)	"La reina de la bailanta" (Cacho Castaña)

=== Round 13 – Repechage ===
During this round, the eliminated couples came back for a second chance. Only 5 couple re-entered into the competition: 2 were chosen by the judges, and 3 were chosen by the public vote. Some celebrities declined the offer of coming back, so they had replacements:

- Claudia Albertario was replaced by Ayelén Paleo
- Cecilia Bonelli was replaced by Julieta Bal
- Alejandra Maglietti was replaced by Sofía Pachano
- Jorge Ibáñez was replaced by Daniel "Tota" Santillán
- Adabel Guerrero was replaced by Belén Francese

Running order

Date	Couple	Song (original artist)	Result
October 14	Geraldine & Lucas	"Oh! Darling" (The Beatles)	Eliminated
October 14	Camilo & Nadia	"Para siempre" (Los Ratones Paranoicos)	Re-Entered
October 14	Sofía & Bruno	"Angels" (Robbie Williams)	Eliminated
October 14	Yanina & Augusto	"Somebody to Love" (Glee Cast)	Re-Entered
October 14	Vanina & Sergio	"De música ligera" (Soda Stereo)	Eliminated
October 14	Julieta & Javier	"Ya fue" (Fabiana Cantilo)	Eliminated
October 14	Connie & Cristian	"Ji ji ji" (Los Redondos)	Eliminated
October 14	Tota & Mavi	"Historia de un Amor" (Luis Miguel)	Re-Entered
October 14	Belén & Nicolás	"Colgando en tus manos" (Carlos Baute & Marta Sánchez)	Re-Entered
October 14	Ayelén & Cristian	"Y Yo Sigo Aquí" (Paulina Rubio)	Eliminated
October 14	Soledad & Andrea	"No me enseñaste" (Thalía)	Re-Entered

=== Round 14 ===
Running order

Date	Couple	Score	Song (original artist)
October 21	Chiqui & Irina	48 (10,**10**,8,10,10)	"El Rey" (Vicente Fernández)
October 21	Marcelo & Indira	47 (10,**9**,10,9,9	"Livin' la Vida Loca" (Ricky Martin)
October 21	Iliana & Gastón	42 (10,**10**,5,9,8)	"Mamma Mia" (ABBA)
October 21	Tota & Mavi	46 (10,**10**,9,8,9)	"El matador" (Cacho Castaña)
October 21	Silvina & Sebastián	47 (10,**10**,10,8,9)	"Rock del gato" (Los Ratones Paranoicos)
October 21	Mole & Natalie	29 (7,**7**,7,2,6)	"Mi religión" (Javier Calamaro)
October 21	Soledad & Andrea	46 (10,**10**,10,7,9)	"Killing Me Softly with His Song" (Fugees)
October 28	Camilo & Nadia	40 (**9**,9,8,5,9)	"Amarte así" (Alejandro Lerner)
October 28	Yanina & Augusto	37 (**9**,9,7,5,7)	"Private Emotion" (Ricky Martin)
October 28	Belén & Nicolás	24 (**6**,6,5,2,5)	"Susanita" (Patricio Rey y sus Redonditos de Ricota)

=== Round 15 ===
Running order

Date	Couple	Score	Song (original artist)
October 28	Chiqui & Irina	48 (10,**10**,10,8,10)	"Si tú no estás aquí" (Rosana)
October 28	Marcelo & Indira	42 (9,**9**,8,7,9)	"Sueña" (Luis Miguel)
November 4	Camilo & Nadia	40 (9,**8**,7,8,8)	"Prófugos" (Soda Stereo)
November 4	Soledad & Andrea	44 (9,**9**,8,9,9)	"Pero Me Acuerdo de Ti" (Christina Aguilera)
November 4	Yanina & Augusto	40 (9,**9**,7,8,7)	"Can't Take My Eyes Off You" (Gloria Gaynor)
November 4	Iliana & Gastón	42 (9,**9**,9,6,9)	"¿A quién le importa?" (Thalía)
November 4	Tota & Mavi	34 (8,**8**,7,4,7)	"Por ese palpitar" (Sandro de América)
November 4	Silvina & Sebastián	45 (10,**9**,8,8,10)	"Rescata mi corazón" (Manuel Wirtz)
November 4	Mole & Natalie	32 (8,**8**,6,3,7)	"La fiesta" (El Puma Rodríguez)

=== Round 16 ===
Running order

Date	Couple	Score	Song (original artist)
November 11	Marcelo & Indira	46 (10,10,9,7,**10**)	"No Me Doy por Vencido" (Luis Fonsi)
November 11	Silvina & Sebastián	45 (9,9,9,9,**9**)	"Estoy aquí" (Rosario Flores)
November 11	Jorge & Andrea	45 (9,10,10,7,**9**)	"Como yo nadie te ha amado" (Bon Jovi)
November 18	Chiqui & Irina	43 (**9**,9,8,8,9)	"Tengo" (Sandro)
November 18	Yanina & Augusto	44 (**10**,10,7,8,9)	"From This Moment On" (Shania Twain)
November 18	Iliana & Gastón	45 (**9**,9,9,9,9)	"Bamboleo" (Gipsy Kings)
November 18	Mole & Indira	33 (**8**,8,7,3,7)	"Tal Vez" (Ricky Martin)
November 18	Camilo & Nadia	39 (**8**,8,8,7,8)	"Muchacha (Ojos de papel)" (Luis Alberto Spinetta)

- During this round, Soledad Cescato as replaced by Jorge Moliniers.

=== Round 17 ===
Running order

Date	Couple	Score	Song (original artist)
November 28	Chiqui & Irina	48 (**10**,10,10,9,9)	"Chiquitita" (ABBA)
November 28	Yanina & Augusto	38 (**8**,9,7,7,7)	"Entrégate" (Luis Miguel)
November 28	Soledad & Andrea	45 (**9**,9,9,9,9)	"Amáme en cámara lenta" (Valeria Lynch)
November 28	Iliana & Gastón	35 (**8**,8,8,4,7)	"Oye" (Gloria Estefan)
November 28	Marcelo & Indira	47 (**9**,10,10,8,10)	"No Importa la Distancia" (Ricky Martin)
November 28	Silvina & Sebastián	42 (**9**,9,8,8,8)	"Azúcar amargo" (Fey)
November 28	Mole & Indira	47 (**9**,10,10,8,10)	"A esa" (Pimpinela)

=== Round 18 ===
During this round, all the couples went to a duel, and the judges saved 3 couples, that advanced to the semi-finals. The other 3, when to the public vote, and 2 of them were eliminated.

Running order

Date	Couple	Song (original artist)	Result
December 2	Chiqui & Irina	"11 y 6" (Fito Páez)	Advanced to the Semi-finals
December 2	Soledad & Andrea	"Girls Just Want to Have Fun" (Cyndi Lauper)	Eliminated
December 2	Marcelo & Indira	"Mentirosa" (Ráfaga)	Advanced to the Semi-finals
December 2	Mole & Indira	"Cachete, pechito y ombligo" (Georgie Dann)	Advanced to the Semi-finals
December 2	Silvina & Sebastián	"Cuando amas a alguien" (César Pueyrredón)	Saved by the Public Vote
December 2	Iliana & Gastón	"Vasos Vacíos" (Los Fabulosos Cadillacs ft. Celia Cruz)	Eliminated
