= Cámara en Mano =

Argentine reality television show

Cámara en Mano, ¿y Vos, Que Ves? (Camera in Hand, How About You, What are you Seeing?), better known and advertised as Cámara en Mano, is an Argentine reality-type television show. In the show, interviewers stage and record spontaneous interviews with celebrities.

== History ==
"Cámara en Mano" debuted in November 2005 on Argentina television network Telefé. The show is a reality-type show, where various interviewers, some of which had already reached show business fame in Argentina and others which hadn't, attend different events with celebrities involved or film different types of adventures, always carrying a small, hand-held camera. Most of the times, celebrities are recorded without being aware that they will be shown on television, although some famous people have recognized the interviewers instantly. President Néstor Kirchner went as far as saying that he watched the show when he spotted a Cámara en Mano interviewer after a political rally. Former President Carlos Menem has also been interviewed.

Singer Sandro spotted one of Cámara en Mano's interviewers near his private swimming pool. Not knowing he was being filmed for a television show, he accepted to talk to the interviewer and answered questions from behind his house's fence. The person who interviewed Sandro that day was Lucia Maciel, a regular interviewer who is also an actress, having participated in various Argentine telenovelas, including Resistiré with Celeste Cid.

Maciel has interviewed many celebrities for Cámara en Mano. She was given a kiss on the cheeks by Enrique Iglesias during a press conference she covered for the daily show. She also held a moke sparring session with women's boxing world champion Marcela Acuna, and was at Buenos Aires' famous Luna Park, Buenos Aires recording a kick-boxing world title fight.

Other people who have appeared in Cámara en Mano are male boxing world champion Jorge Castro, actor Facundo Arana and fashion model Jessica Cirio.

Not all celebrities have been kind to Cámara en Mano interviewers: on the December 30, 2005 telecast of the show, a video of an Argentine politician injuring a "Cámara en Mano" reporter by closing a car door and getting the interviewer's hand jammed between the car and its door, was shown. This interviewer required a quick visit to a local hospital's emergency room, and had his hand immobilised with a first aid product.

The Cámara en Mano team also filmed a video during an airplane flight each of the members of Camara en Mano's cast took to Uruguay, to play a friendly soccer match with a Uruguayan team.

Cámara en Mano's host is Matias Martin. He has admitted that the show is, according to him, a hybrid between two other similar Argentine shows of the past, Teikirisi (pronounced "take it easy") and Cámara Testigo (Witness Camera), both of which enjoyed success in South America.

It could be said that the show's trademark is Martin's phrase at the end of each of Cámara en Mano's programs, when he asks, aloud, the question that is actually part of the show's official name, ¿Y vos, que ves??? ("and you, what do you see?").

== See also ==
- List of television shows
