= Martín Insaurralde =

Argentine politician and mayor of Lomas de Zamora

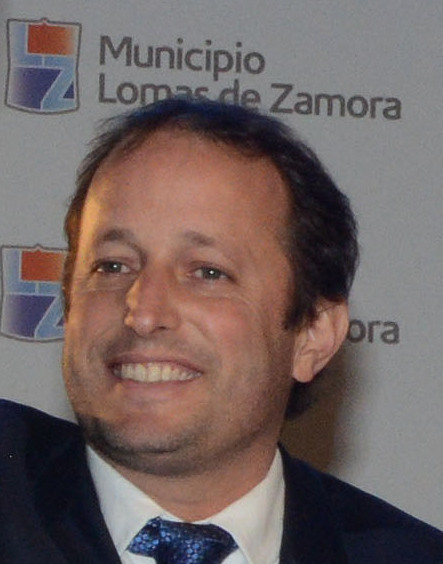
- Insaurralde in 2013

Cabinet Chief of Buenos Aires Province
- In office 20 September 2021 – 30 September 2023
- Governor: Axel Kicillof
- Preceded by: Carlos Bianco
- Succeeded by: Post dissolved

Mayor of Lomas de Zamora
- In office 16 December 2014 – 20 September 2021
- Preceded by: Santiago Carasatorre
- Succeeded by: Marina Lesci
- In office 16 December 2014 – 4 December 2013
- Preceded by: Jorge Rossi
- Succeeded by: Santiago Carasatorre

National Deputy
- In office 10 December 2013 – 16 December 2014
- Succeeded by: Luis Cigogna
- Constituency: Buenos Aires

Personal details
- Born: 30 May 1970 (age 55) Lomas de Zamora, Argentina
- Party: Justicialist Party
- Other political affiliations: Front for Victory
- Spouse(s): Liliana Toledo (1994-2000); Carolina Álvarez (2005-2008); Jesica Cirio (2014-2023)
- Children: 4
- Occupation: Politician

Martín Insaurralde (born 30 May 1970) is an Argentine politician of the Justicialist Party. He was intendente (mayor) of the Lomas de Zamora partido (municipality) from 16 December 2014 to 20 September 2021, and was previously between 28 October 2009 and 4 December 2013. Between 2013 and 2014, he was a member of the Argentine Chamber of Deputies. From 2021 until his resignation in 2023, he served as chief of the Cabinet of Ministers of Buenos Aires Province, under Governor Axel Kicillof.

== Political career ==
=== Early work ===
In 2003, Martín Insaurralde was elected as a councillor in the municipal council of Lomas de Zamora, under the electoral list led by Jorge Rossi as mayor. In the 2007 elections he was re-elected as a councillor under the banner of the Front for Victory, with 17% of the vote.

On 27 October 2009, Rossi resigned his post for personal reasons, and Insaurralde replaced him as a caretaker mayor, as a consequence of his being the top of the electoral list, and so the first in the line of succession.

=== First term as mayor ===
After two years of being a caretaker mayor of Lomas de Zamora, Insaurralde was elected in the 2011 Argentine general election with 66.16% of the vote, against the 8.24% gained by the Broad Progressive Front candidate; this was the highest percentage in the history of local elections in the partido. Insaurralde also won the primary elections in August 2011 with a large margin, obtaining 62.73% of the vote, against 10.2% for the nearest candidate from the Popular Union.

Insaurralde focused on infrastructure during his first term, calling it a "revolution of works", and describing the resultant costs as "not a spend, [but] an investment". Over the course of his term, more than 1300 city blocks were newly paved. Significant improvements to the sewer network were made jointly with national government, especially in connecting them into the Unamuno and del Rey streams, which the local government claimed would benefit 270,000 families.

He remained in the role of mayor until 2013, at which point he resigned to become a member of the Chamber of Deputies. He was replaced by Santiago Carasatorre.

=== Chamber of Deputies ===
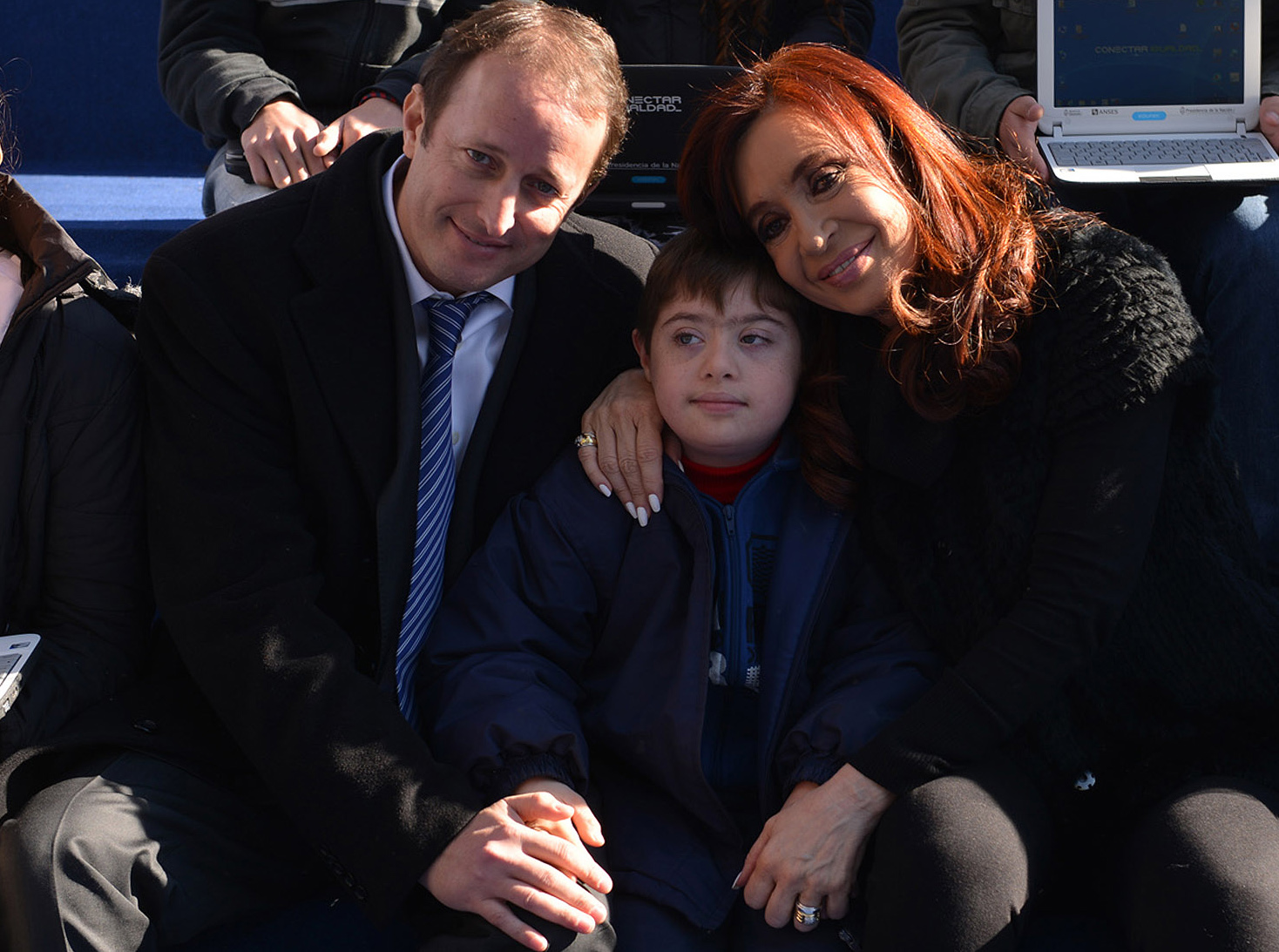
Martín Insaurralde (left) in 2013 with Cristina Fernández de Kirchner, at the time the President of Argentina.

On 22 June 2013, Martín Insaurralde was confirmed as the first list candidate for member of the Chamber of Deputies, on the Buenos Aires province list of the Front for Victory for the August primary elections. Days later, on 26 June, the list he headed received support from the mayors of 78 municipalities of Buenos Aires, and from the governor of the province, Daniel Scioli.

In the primary elections of 11 August 2013, Insaurralde's list gained 29.65% of the vote, putting the list in second place behind the Renewal Front of the mayor of Tigre Partido Sergio Massa, which gained 35.05%. He subsequently spoke of his conviction that this result could be overturned by the time of the legislative elections on 27 October. During these elections, the Front for Victory list gained a greater percentage of the vote - 32.18% - but still remained roughly the same distance behind the Renewal Front, who won the elections with 43.92% of the vote.

=== Second term as mayor ===
Insaurralde resigned his post as a member of the Chamber of Deputies to return as a candidate for mayor of Lomas de Zamora in the 2015 Argentine general election. He was replaced in the Chamber of Deputies by Luis Cigogna.

In the primary elections, he obtained 48.63% of the vote, against 22.53% from the Cambiemos alliance, and 15.91% from the United for a New Alternative alliance.

Insaurralde was re-elected in the October 2015 elections with 47.53% of the vote, against the 26.31% of his closest rival, Gabriel Mercuri of Cambiemos. During the 2019 Argentine general election his mandate was re-confirmed, obtaining 59.16% of the vote, against 30.13% obtained by the Together for Change candidate, who was closest.

In April 2019, Insaurralde launched "Eco Lomas", a programme with an aim of caring for the environment in Lomas de Zamora, and heading for "a greener city with a better quality of life". As part of this programme, nine new recycling centres were built across the municipality, and a scheme was set up to provide school pupils with bicycles to incentivise physical activity.

On 19 September 2021, Insaurralde was tapped as the new Chief of the Cabinet of Ministers of Buenos Aires Province, under Governor Axel Kicillof. He replaced Carlos Bianco as part of a cabinet reshuffle following the governing Frente de Todos' defeat in the 2021 primary elections.

=== Chief of the Cabinet of Ministers of Buenos Aires province ===
Insaurralde assumed office as Cabinet Chief of Buenos Aires Province on 20 September 2021. He would serve in this position until 30 September 2023 when several photos were shown by the media of him and his girlfriend Sofia Clérici on board a luxury yacht off the coast of Marbella, in Spain, the publication of these photos would lead to a public scandal that would end with his resignation as the Cabinet Chief. Later on 2 October 2023, he would also abandon his candidacy to become a councilor of the Lomas de Zamora Partido.

== Personal life ==
In 1993, Insaurralde married Liliana Toledo, with whom he had two children, Martín and Rodrigo; they divorced in 2000. In 2005, he married Carolina Álvarez, with whom he had a third child, Bautista; Insaurralde and Carolina also divorced, three years later. In November 2014, Insaurralde married the actress and model Jésica Cirio, with whom he had another child, Chloé.

During the 2011 election campaign, Insaurralde announced that he had been diagnosed with a seminoma, a type of testicular cancer. He went through surgical treatment for the cancer, and treatment including chemotherapy. On 10 September 2011, he said that the experience was "one of the most difficult" of his life, and that without the "company" of his constituents, it would have been more difficult.

His father, Rodolfo Insaurralde, died in 2017. He was more than 80 years old at the time of his death.

On 12 June 2020, during the COVID-19 pandemic, Insaurralde announced that he had tested positive for the virus, and urged people to stay home to protect themselves. He had recently been in contact with Argentine president Alberto Fernández, who later went into voluntary self-isolation. After nearly two weeks in hospital, as well as receiving a blood transfusion, he was cleared to return to his home on 24 June.
