= Jésica Cirio =

Argentine model (born 1985)

Jessica Cirio
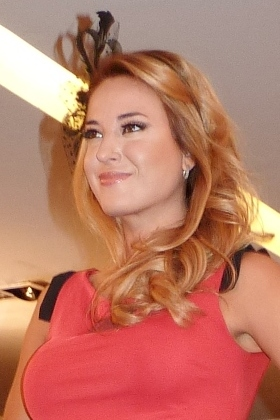
- Cirio in 2011
- Born: Jessica Wanda Judith Cirio Perutich; 21 March 1985 (age 41); Lanús, Buenos Aires, Argentina
- Occupations: Model; dancer; actress
- Spouse: Martín Insaurralde (m. 2014; div. 2023)
- Children: 1
- Modeling information
- Hair color: Blond
- Eye color: Green

Jessica Wanda Judith Cirio Perutich (born 21 March 1985), better known as Jésica Cirio or Jessica Cirio, is an Argentine model and dancer. She was born in Lanús, Buenos Aires and has appeared on the Argentine reality show Cámara en Mano as well as in pictorial spreads in Revista Hombre.

== Fame ==
She was the host of Kubik, a TV programme broadcast in La Plata's America 2. She also took part in two popular Argentine-versions of ShowMatch Bailando por un sueño in 2006, 2008 and 2012 and Dancing on Ice also in 2006. Cirio has worked many times in Chile and has also been in Fiebre de Baile.

=== Beginnings ===
Her first public appearance was in 2001, when she ran for the title of "Diosa Tropical" ("Tropical Goddess") on the television program Pasión Tropical. Later, she played the role of the niece of Gerardo Sofovich in "Polémica en el Bar". She was also a special guest on "Cámara en Mano".

In 2004, she was chosen to be the hostess of the program Kubik for America 2, where she remained until 2009, being replaced by Victoria Vanucci, and then by Ivanna Palliotti, Melina Pitra, and Alejandra Maglietti.

=== 2006–2010: ShowMatch and Chile ===
In 2006, Cirio participated in the first edition of Bailando por un Sueño, segment of ShowMatch for Canal 13, which made it to the semifinals. Cirio also participated in other television programs, in roles with which it was becoming more known.

In 2007, she participated in the first edition of Patinando por un Sueño, figure skating competition of the program ShowMatch, hosted by Marcelo Tinelli. The model demonstrated her talent on the track, and reached the semifinals, in which she lost to actress Anita Martínez, but also fulfilled the dream of a dreamer. She left 20 ° between 22 participants.

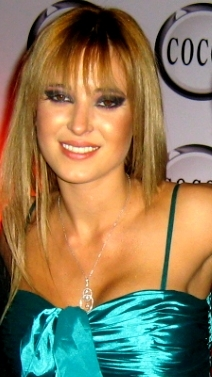
Cirio in 2008

In February 2008, Cirio was invited by Chilevisión to the programme of celebrity gossip and entertainment SQP where she covered the details of the Festival of Viña del Mar, in Chile.

In 2008, she again took part in the fifth edition of Bailando por un Sueño.

In 2009, Cirio returned to Chile to participate in Fiebre de Baile and the series Infieles and Teatro en Chilevision.

Cirio in late-2009 debuted as the first vedette of the music hall, "Carnaval de Estrellas" in the province of Villa Carlos Paz. The musical's main cast was (in order of figures): Valeria Lynch later Estela Raval, Raúl Lavié, Cirio, Flavio Mendoza, Juan Carlos Calabró, Marcos "Bicho" Gómez, Martín "Campi" Campilongo, "Pepa" Brizuela, Florencia "Floppy" Tesouro, Sabrina Artaza, Pabla Thomen, Marikena Cornejo and cast. Produced by "Jordan Productions" with Andrea Stivel and Daniel Comba, creators. Choreographes by Hugo Gómez and Vanina Befaro while Beto Romano was the designer of the costumes. The musical debuted on 18 December 2009, in theater, Candilejas I.

In 2010 she was invited to the program Así Somos by the Chilean TV channel La Red and then she hosted with Roberto Menna (Bobby) Impacto 9 by Canal 9 and participate in Bailando por un Sueño 2010, in which she was eliminated but was already planning to get off the competition because of the death of her former boyfriend.

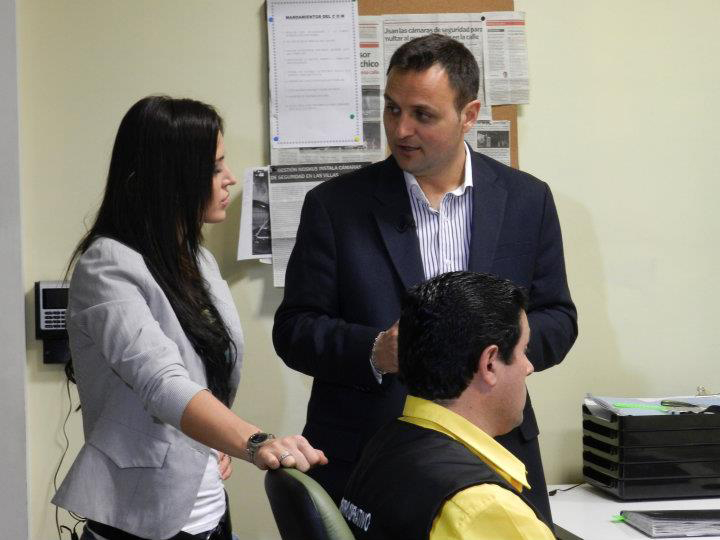
Cirio in Impact 9

=== 2011 – present: Excitante & Noche de Astros ===
From late-2011 through early-2012, Jésica Cirio was in the theatre musical Excitante. The show presented itself in the theatre of Mar del Plata. The producer was Daniel Comba and the show was led and presented by Miguel Ángel Cherutti and Nito Artaza.

The musical finished in its fourth musical cycle and with Cirio as the co-lead vedette after supervedette Adabel Guerrero. The show was formed by Adabel Guerrero, Jésica Cirio, Estefanía Bacca, Alejandra Maglietti, Cinthia Fernández & Virginia Dobrich as well as Miguel Ángel Cherutti and Nito Artaza also Marcos "Bicho" Gómez, the late Estela Raval with Los 5 Latinos and Adrián Kiss the shows lead male dancer and acrobat.

On 2 November 2012, Cirio made an appearance for the river border state of Argentina to Uruguay, Entre Ríos Province in the Astros theater where she and many other theater artist presented Entre Ríos' summer theatrical season debut for 2012 and 2013 with three shows, one in which she starred as the lead vedette in a theater magazine, "Noche de Astros". Cirio has abandoned the magazine for unknown reasons.

On 6 November 2014, Cirio married politician Martín Insaurralde at the Lomas de Zamora civil registry, and on 8 November of that year they celebrated the wedding at La Manea Polo Club in Ezeiza. The two split up in November 2022 and divorced in 2023.

== Trajectory ==
=== Television ===
1. 1999 – Pasión tropical – América TV – Video.
2. 1999 – Polémica en el Bar (segmento) – Canal 9 – niece
3. 2004/2009 – Kubik – América 2 – Hostess.
4. 2005 – Noche de juegos – TVN – guest
5. 2006 – Bailando por un sueño – Canal 13 – competitor (7/9)
6. 2006 – Cámara en Mano – special guest.
7. 2007 – Patinando por un sueño – Canal 13 – competitor (20/22).
8. 2008 – SQP (Chile) – Chilevisión – Special journalist of the Festival of Viña del Mar
9. 2008 – Bailando por un sueño – Canal 13 – competitor (32/42).
10. 2008 – Teatro en Chilevisión – Chilevisión – actress
11. 2009 – Fiebre de baile – Chilevisión – competitor
12. 2009 – Infieles – Chilevisión – actress
13. 2010 – Así somos – La Red – special guest
14. 2010 – Impacto 9 – Canal 9 – hostess
15. 2010 – Bailando por un Sueño – Canal 13 – competitor (19/31).
16. 2012 – AM – Telefe – guest
17. 2014 – Bailando por un Sueño – Canal 13 – current competitor

=== Theatre ===
1. 2009–2010 – "Carnaval de Estrellas" (Valeria Lynch, Raúl Lavie and Flavio Mendoza) – Teatro Candileja I (Villa Carlos Paz) – Replaced by Adabel Guerrero.
2. 2011–2012 – "Excitante" (Estela Raval, Adabel Guerrero, Nito Artaza and Miguel Ángel Cherutti) – Mar del Plata.
3. 2012 – "Noche de Astros" (Miguel Ángel Cherutti and Marcos "Bicho" Gómez) – Teatro Astros (Entre Ríos) – Abandoned.

== See also ==
- List of glamour models
