= And to My Nephew Albert I Leave the Island What I Won off Fatty Hagan in a Poker Game =

Novel by David Forrest

in Swedish language

https://libris.kb.se/bt3h7r5v8jxrnl2j#it

And to My Nephew Albert I Leave the Island What I Won off Fatty Hagan in a Poker Game is a novel written by David Forrest (pen-name used by English novelists Robert Forrest-Webb and David Eliades). It is the best-known novel of the author(s).

== Plot ==
First published in 1969, the novel tells the story of a Russian spy-ship (the Dmitri Kirov) crashing into Albert's small island in the Isles of Scilly. Desperate to stop the ship's highly-secret equipment falling into the hands of the British and Americans, the Soviet government agrees to buy the half of the uninhabited island the "Dmitri Kirov" is stranded on.

When the American intelligence services discover this Russian acquisition, they immediately purchase the other half of the island. Thereafter, in a humorous tone, the author discusses the initial suspicious coexistence between the Russians and the Americans, which is transformed, amid a comic love story, into a communal friendship and enterprise to manufacture alcohol for their joint enjoyment and feasts...

== Translations ==
The novel has been translated in several languages :

- in French language
- in Spanish language
- in German language
- in Danish language

== See also ==
- "And to My Nephew Albert I Leave the Island What I Won off Fatty Hagan in A Poker Game; By David Forrest. 222 pp. New York: William Morrow & Co. $4.95". 9 March 1969 – via NYTimes.com..
