= The Great Dinosaur Robbery =

1970 novel by David Forrest

- First edition
- Author: David Forrest
- Language: English
- Genre: Detective fiction
- Publisher: Hodder & Stoughton
- Publication date: 1970
- Publication place: United Kingdom
- Media type: Print (hardcover & paperback)

The Great Dinosaur Robbery is a 1970 novel by David Forrest (pseudonym of David Eliades and Robert Forrest Webb). This book was the basis for the 1975 film One of Our Dinosaurs Is Missing.

== Plot ==
The book is set in New York City in the 1970s, and follows attempts by a group of five British nannies who discover that a microdot containing Chinese military secrets believed to be vital to the survival of the British Empire has been hidden in a dinosaur skeleton in the American Museum of Natural History. However, since they cannot find the message, they contrive to steal the entire skeleton and mail it to the Queen. Furthermore, in the story, the Chinese agents who hope to retrieve the message, and also the Americans searching for the missing dinosaur skeleton, play important roles.

== Film adaptation ==
The film differed greatly from the book in the sense that it was aimed for children rather than adults, with violence and sexual references toned down considerably to suit the target audience. The setting of the plot was also changed from New York City to England, principally London, along with the time period, set to the 1920s in the movie. Another point of note is that, in the book, the villains were agents of communist China, while the film's agents were from post-World War I China, with Cold War undertones practically non-existent.
