= Mónica González (dancer) =

Argentine professional theater dancer and vedette

- Born: Mónica Andrea González Merlo; Corrientes, Argentina
- Occupations: vedette; dancer; singer; model; actress
- Years active: 2005–present
- Height: 1.81 m (5 ft 11 1/2 in)

Mónica Andrea González Merlo de Listorti (Spanish pronunciation: [ˈmonika ɣonˈsales]) is an Argentine professional theater dancer and vedette, as well as the wife of TV host and comedian José María Listorti. González participated in Argentina's version of Dancing with the Stars, Bailando 2011.

== Career ==
=== El Fondo Puede Esperar ===
In 2005 after many struggles to be cast in theater being that she auditioned to be a back up dancer and measures 1.81 m (5 ft 11 1/2 in) tall, she found her break in the comedy musical El Fondo Puede Esperar in where she was cast as a simple dancer. The musical starred comedians José María Listorti and Alvaro "Waldo" Navia, former runway model Denise Dumas, tango singer Alberto Bianco and a large cast of dancers directed by choreographer and acrobat Flavio Mendoza. This is where she and José María met each other. Even though she was cast as a back-up dancer, González stood out as a big star in the musical, having little lead roles and being turned into the lead dancer.

=== Bailando ===
Mónica González participated in the reality dance competition, Bailando 2011 with professional dance partner Maximiliano D'Iorio. She was replaced by Argentine model and actress Belén Francese in round 7–10 because of a leg injury that González suffered while practising her pole dance choreography. González was eliminated in the Merengue round by her husband's hosting partner Denise Dumas.

=== El Anfitrión ===
In 2011 González was offered to star in the 2011–2012 theater season musical El Anfitrión as the 1st vedette. She was accompanied by her Bailando professional dance partner Maximiliano D'Iorio as the first dancer. The show's creative director was the Austrian vedette, Reina Reech. Also in the show as the actor-comedian was "Cacho" Buenaventura, second vedette, acrobat-dancer Estefanía Bacca and the magician, Emanuel. The lead supervedette and main attraction of the show was María Martha Serra Lima. The musical debuted in Córdoba, Argentina, 16 December 2011 in the theater, Candilejas I.

== Personal life ==
Mónica de Listorti lives in Buenos Aires and Córdoba, Argentina. She's married to José María Listorti, father of her son Franco (b. 1 November 2009). Their civil wedding was on 1 November and their wedding in church was on 3 November 2012.
