= One of Our Dinosaurs Is Missing =

1975 film by Robert Stevenson

One of Our Dinosaurs is Missing
- Theatrical release poster
- Directed by: Robert Stevenson
- Written by: Bill Walsh
- Based on: The Great Dinosaur Robbery by David Forrest
- Produced by: Bill Walsh
- Starring: Peter Ustinov; Helen Hayes; Clive Revill; Derek Nimmo
- Cinematography: Paul Beeson
- Edited by: Peter Boita
- Music by: Ron Goodwin
- Production company: Walt Disney Productions
- Distributed by: Buena Vista Distribution
- Release date: July 9, 1975
- Running time: 94 minutes
- Countries: United Kingdom; United States
- Language: English
- Box office: $5.5 million (North American rentals)

One of Our Dinosaurs is Missing is a 1975 comedy film set in the early 1920s, about the theft of a dinosaur skeleton from the Natural History Museum. The film was produced by Walt Disney Productions and released by Buena Vista Distribution Company. The title is a parody of the film title One of Our Aircraft Is Missing, in which both Peter Ustinov and Hugh Burden also appeared. The film was based on the 1970 novel The Great Dinosaur Robbery by David Forrest (pseudonym of David Eliades and Robert Forrest Webb). It was the last work of producer and screenwriter Bill Walsh before his death on January 27, 1975, almost six months before the film's release.

== Plot ==
Escaping from China with a microfilm of the formula for the mysterious "Lotus X", Lord Edward Southmere, a King's Messenger, is chased by a group of Chinese spies.

Back in London, Lord Southmere runs into the Natural History Museum and hides the microfilm in the bones of a large dinosaur skeleton. The spies decide to steal the dinosaur, so they can search it properly, and load the Brontosaurus skeleton on the back of their steam lorry. Some nannies steal the vehicle, which they drive through the foggy streets of London before being carried off to safety on a flat wagon at the back of a train.

The spies eventually find the microfilm at the museum inside the bones of another large dinosaur skeleton, and all misunderstanding is set aside, with good results for all.

== Cast ==
- Derek Nimmo as Edward, Lord Southmere
- Hugh Burden as Haines
- Bernard Bresslaw as Fan Choy
- Helen Hayes as Hettie
- Joan Sims as Emily
- Deryck Guyler as Harris
- Peter Ustinov as Hnup Wan
- Clive Revill as Quon
- Molly Weir as Scots nanny
- Andrew Dove as Lord Castleberry
- Max Harris as Truscott
- Max Wall as Juggler
- Natasha Pyne as Susan
- Joss Ackland as B.J. Spence
- Arthur Howard as Thumley
- Roy Kinnear as Superintendent Grubbs
- Leonard Trolley as Inspector Eppers
- Joe Ritchie as Cabbie
- Percy Herbert as Mr. Gibbons
- Joan Hickson as Mrs. Gibbons
- John Laurie as Jock
- Angus Lennie as Hamish
- Jon Pertwee as Colonel Mortimer
- Kathleen Byron as Mrs. Mortimer
- Lucy Griffiths as Amelia
- Aimée Delamain as Millicent
- John Bardon as Bookmaker
- Jane Lapotaire as Miss Prescott
- Richard Pearson as Sir Geoffrey
- Michael Elwyn as Haycock
- Anthony Sharp as Home Secretary
- Wensley Pithey as Bromley
- Frank Williams as Dr. Freemo
- Peter Madden as Sanders
- Erik Chitty as Museum guard
- Amanda Barrie as Mrs. B.J. Spence

== Source material ==
The book on which the film was based, The Great Dinosaur Robbery, was aimed at an adult audience by its authors, Robert Forrest Webb and David Eliades, and was set in New York. The authors, both very experienced UK national journalists and best-selling authors, extensively researched material in New York and were greatly assisted by the American Museum of Natural History, and by the New York Police Department responsible for that area. The authors were disappointed that the humour of the film was aimed at a very much younger audience than that in the book, which had been published, in several languages, extremely successfully throughout Europe and also in Australia, New Zealand, and the U.S.

== Production ==
=== Filming ===
The film was shot on location in England at Elstree Studios and Pinewood Studios. Additional filming took place at London Zoo, the Natural History Museum, and around Windsor and Holyport Green, Maidenhead.

Ustinov, Revill, and Bresslaw—all white actors—performed in yellowface makeup to portray Chinese characters in the film.

=== Special effects ===
The special photographic effects for One of Our Dinosaurs Is Missing were handled by British special effects artist John Stears. The steam lorry used in the film was a mockup, with the mocked up boiler smaller than that on a real steam lorry. The Diplodocus skeleton model featured in the film was later used in Star Wars (1977), in the opening scenes in the Tunisian desert.

=== Home media ===
One of Our Dinosaurs is Missing has been released on VHS and DVD. The DVD last physical format release was in the UK on April 12, 2004

The film is absent from streaming on Disney+.

== See also ==
- List of films featuring dinosaurs
