= Excitante =

- Genre: Musical theatre, Revue
- Created by: Miguel Ángel Cherutti; Nito Artaza
- Directed by: Marcos "Bicho" Gómez
- Starring: Miguel Ángel; Nito Artaza; Estela Raval; Adabel Guerrero; Flavio Mendoza; Carmen Flores; Jésica Cirio; Adrián Kiss
- Country of origin: Argentina
- Original language: Spanish

Production
- Producer: Daniel Comba
- Production locations: Mar del Plata; Villa Carlos Paz

Excitante (also spelled Exitante) is an Argentine musical & theatre show that acted in the theatre of Mar del Plata and later Villa Carlos Paz. The show was presented and let by the creators Miguel Ángel Cherutti and Nito Artaza, and also led by vedette, Adabel Guerrero and singer Estela Raval. The show debuted in Mar del Plata, Buenos Aires on 2 December 2010, ending in September. The musical's third musical cycle debuted in Villa Carlos Paz, Córdoba in December. It has recently finished its fourth and last cycle in the months of April and May, with the death of its lead woman, Raval, on 6 June 2012 in Buenos Aires.

== Cast ==
The show was formed by Adabel Guerrero, Jésica Cirio, Estefanía Bacca, Cinthia Fernández, Alejandra Maglietti & Virginia Dobrich as well as Luciana Salazar, Carmen Flores, Miguel Ángel Cherutti and Nito Artaza, also Marcos "Bicho" Gómez, Estela Raval with los 5 Latinos and Adrián Kiss the shows lead male dancer and acrobat showman.

Rank	Artist	Cycles
Lead Supervedette	Estela Raval	1, 2, 4
Lead Supervedette	Carmen Flores (Replacement)	3
First Vedette	Adabel Guerrero (Principal)	1–4
First Vedette	Jésica Cirio (Supporting)	3, 4
Showman	Flavio Mendoza	1, 2
Showman	Adrián Kiss	3, 4
Second Vedette	Jésica Cirio	1
Second Vedette	Estefanía Bacca	2, 3
Second Vedette	Alejandra Maglietti	4
Third Vedette	Alejandra Maglietti	1, 3
Third Vedette	Cinthia Fernández	2
Half Vedette	Virginia Dobrich	3, 4
Half Vedette	Sofía Macaggi	3, 4
1st Dancer	Virginia Dobrich (Female)	1–4
1st Dancer	Adrián Kiss (Male)	1–4
2nd Dancer	Sofía Macaggi	1–4
Actors	Miguel Ángel Cherutti	1–4
Actors	Estefanía Bacca	2, 3
Actors	Martín "Campi" Campilongo	1–4
Actors	Nito Artaza	1–4
Actors	Marcos "Bicho" Gómez	1–4
Actors	Luciana Salazar	1
Actors	Alejandra Maglietti	1, 3, 4
Comedians	Miguel Ángel Cherutti	1–4
Comedians	Nito Artaza	1–4
Comedians	Martín "Campi" Campilongo	1–4
Comedians	Marcos "Bicho" Gómez	1–4
Dancers	Adabel Guerrero	1–4
Dancers	Jésica Cirio	1, 3, 4
Dancers	Estefanía Bacca	2, 3
Dancers	Cinthia Fernández	2
Dancers	Alejandra Maglietti	1, 3, 4
Dancers	Sofía Macaggi	
Dancers	Roberto el Diego Doval	
Dancers	Lourdes Sánchez	
Dancers	Hernán Doval	
Dancers	Javier F. Romero	
Dancers	Macarena Rinaldi	
Dancers	Laura Zerillo	
Dancers	Gisele Takakuwa	
Singers	Estela Raval	1, 2, 4
Singers	Carmen Flores	3
Singers	Adabel Guerrero	3, 4
Acrobats	Flavio Mendoza	1, 2
Acrobats	Estefanía Bacca	2, 3
Acrobats	Chintia Fernández	2
Acrobats	Adrián Kiss	1–4
Acrobats	Adabel Guerrero	3, 4
Acrobats	Jésica Cirio	3, 4
Acrobats	Virginia Dobrich	3, 4
Magician	El Mago Emanuel	1–4
Musicians	The 5 Latinos	1–4

== Estela Raval ==
Estela Raval
- Born: Palma Nicolina Ravallo; 19 May 1935; Buenos Aires, Argentina
- Died: 6 June 2012 (aged 77); Buenos Aires, Argentina
- Occupation: Singer

Palma Nicolina Ravallo, better known as Estela Raval, was one of the first Argentine singer of pop latino back to the 1950s. She was accompanied by a band named The 5 Latinos.

Raval was the lead in the musical. In the musical she showed her talented voice, she sang in the theatre show as of the 1st cycle. She was being replaced by Spanish singer and actress Carmen Flores, sister of the late Lola Flores, for the third cycle being that Raval was battling cancer. She later returned to her place as of March. Estela Raval eventually died on 6 June 2012 in Buenos Aires.

== Adabel Guerrero ==
Adabel Guerrero
- Born: 18 July 1978 (age 48); La Plata, Argentina
- Modeling information
- Height: 1.68 m (5 ft 6 in)
- Hair color: dark brown
- Eye color: blue

Adabel Anahí Guerrero Melachenco (born 18 July 1978) better known simply as Adabel Guerrero is an Argentine dancer, actress, supervedette, cabaret star and singer.

Guerrero was the lead 1st vedette in the musical. In the musical she showed her talent in dance including her ability in ballet. She also sang in the theater show as of the 3rd cycle with taped clips of her rise in fame. She also had a live scene on the show in which she performed in the art of acrobatics alongside Adrian Kiss. Adabel has figured in all four cycles from late 2010 to 2012, finishing in the months of April and May.

== Jésica Cirio ==
Jésica Cirio
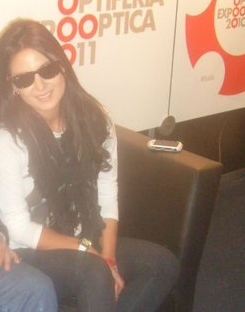
- Modeling information
- Height: 1.70 m (5 ft 7 in)
- Hair color: Brown
- Eye color: Brown

Jessica Wanda Judith Cirio Perutich (born 21 March 1982 in Lanús, Buenos Aires Province) is an Argentine model, dancer and vedette of Italian descent.

Cirio was the co-lead 1st vedette in the musical. The revue showed Cirio perform as Guerrero's back-up vedette and the co-lead. She had many dance routines in the musical. Jésica Cirio was in the musical's first cycle in late 2010 to early 2011 as the second vedette and had now returned in the 3rd cycle of the musical as co-lead. She was in all of the musicals cycles except the second.

== Estefanía Bacca ==
Estefanía Bacca
- Born: Estefanía Bacca; Santa Fe, Argentina
- Occupations: Dancer, acrobat, actress, model, choreographer, singer
- Modeling information
- Height: 1.70 m (5 ft 7 in)
- Hair color: blonde
- Eye color: green – brown

Estefanía Bacca is an Argentine acrobat-dancer, actress and model.

Bacca joined the cast at the start of the second cycle and remained for its third as the second vedette. Estefanía showed her skills in acting, acrobatics and dance, this being the first time she figures in a musical or play rather them being a basic actress or dancer.

== Cinthia Fernández ==
Cinthia Fernández
- Born: Cinthia Fernández; 11 October 1988 (age 37); Buenos Aires, Argentina
- Occupations: Acrobat, actress, model, dancer

Cinthia Fernández (born 11 October 1988) is an Argentine acrobat-dancer, actress and model.

Fernández only participated in the second cycle of the risqué show as its third vedette. In the magazine she was capable to show her acrobatic and dance abilities. She later on quit to join Flavio Mendoza on his new cirques revue project, Stravaganza.

== Virginia Dobrich ==
Virginia Dobrich
- Born: Virginia Dobrich; 8 December 1983 (age 42); Uruguay
- Occupations: Dancer, actress, cabaret star

Virginia Dobrich (Born 8 December 1983) is a Uruguayan professional dancer.

Dobrich was the lead female dancer as well as a vedette in the musical. She had been in all four cycles as the lead dancer and had now also been figured as a vedette in the shows 3rd cycle. She was in all four cycles.

== Adrián Kiss ==
Adrián Kiss is an Argentine professional theatre dancer & acrobat.

Kiss was the show's showman as well as an acrobatics performer who started as the lead male dancer. Adrián has been in all four cycles and has been figured as lead male dancer for the first two cycles and then as the showman, with the departure of Flavio Mendoza. He had a scene in the revue in which he showed his ability as an acrobat alongside and accompanied by 1st vedettes Adabel Guerrero and Jésica Cirio. He was in all four cycles.
