= Mariana Montes =

Argentine tango dancer and teacher (born 1979)

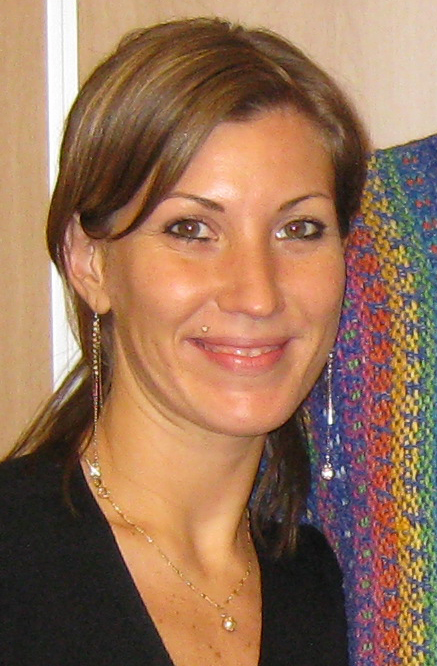
Mariana Montes

Mariana Montes (born on Monday, 5 March 1979, Buenos Aires, Argentina) is an Argentine tango dancer and teacher.

Since 1998, she has been pairing with Sebastián Arce and have travelled the world teaching and performing. As of 2011, they have visited more than 140 cities in 35 countries. Along with Sebastián, they created a dance performance Piazzoleando they choreographed and danced in the dance performance Exodo Tangueado. She also appeared in the 2010 documentary Ad occhi chiusi by Simonetta Rossi.

She lives in Cagliari where she teaches tango in regular classes.
