= Aggiungi un posto a tavola =

Aggiungi un posto a tavola (ET: Set another place at the table) is a musical comedy written by Pietro Garinei, Sandro Giovannini and Jaja Fiastri, with music by Armando Trovaioli. It debuted in 1974 under the direction of Garinei and Giovannini.

An English version called Beyond the Rainbow, adapted by David Forrest with lyrics by Leslie Bricusse, opened in November 1978 at the Adelphi Theatre in London's West End and ran for six months.

== Production history ==
Between 1973 and 1974, Sandro Giovannini and Pietro Garinei wrote a musical comedy inspired by the novel After Me, the Deluge by David Forrest (the pseudonym of David Eliades and Robert Forrest-Webb) with Jaja Fiastri, with music from jazz player Armando Trovaioli. The total cost of the staging was about 250 million lire, due to the complicated wooden pieces in the scenery of the show, and used the turning stage of the Sistina theatre in Rome.. The show received its title after a vote of the company, who preferred Aggiungi un Posto a Tavola (Add a seat at the table) to the alternatives.

The first edition of the show debuted on 8 December 1974 and included Johnny Dorelli as Don Silvestro, Paolo Panelli as the mayor and Bice Valori as Consolazione. The show was a success and lasted for six months, something that never happened before in Italian theatre.

In 1977 the show toured internationally in London, where it wasn't very successful, because of one of it central themes - catholic priests celibacy - Vienna, Madrid, Barcelona, Buenos Aires and São Paulo.

In the most recent edition of the show (2024) the voice of God is that of Enzo Garinei, brother of the writer of the show Pietro Garinei.

== Characters ==
- Don Silvestro, the local priest
- Clementina, daughter of the Mayor
- San Crispino/Crispín, the Mayor
- Totó, the village fool
- Consolazione/Consuelo/Consolation, woman of ill-repute
- The voice of God
- Ensemble

== Plot ==
=== Act 1 ===
Don Silvestro, priest of a fictional village in the mountains in Italy is organising a show called Aggiungi un posto a tavola ("Aggiungi un posto a tavola"). After rehearsal one night, Silvestro is talking to Toto, a villager, and explaining what love is. They're interrupted by young Clementina, daughter of the Mayor and in love with Don Silvestro, who uses the excuse of confessing to be close to him ("Peccato che sia peccato"). After Clementina leaves, Silvestro receives a phone call from God himself, who has decided to send a second universal flood on earth, having chosen the small village to repopulate earth. Don Silvestro has to build an ark, like Noah's, to save the people and animals of the village. God also says that the following night will be destined to procreation and all men will have to lay with their wives.

The following day God wakes all villagers by sounding the church bells and forces Don Silvestro to share what will be happening, to which no one believes him. God performs a miracle, allowing Silvestro to ring the bells with a simple gesture of his fingers, which convinces everyone of the truth ("Concerto per prete e campane"). The atmosphere gets romantic, but suddenly everything is interrupted by the arrival of Consolazione, a woman of ill-repute, whose arrival distracts all the men from "their duty" ("Consolazione"). Don Silvestro asks for God's help, who performs another miracle, boosting the manhood of Toto in order to distract Consolazione.

When Toto announces he has fallen in love with Consolazione and wants to marry her and take her with him on the ark when it sails, the village people are not accepting, but Don Silvestro reminds them of the meaning of Aggiungi un posto a tavola, to be able to forgive. The villagers are still not back at building the ark, but thanks to Clementina everyone restart working on the ark, supporting each other like little ants ("Una formica è solo una formica").

Act one ends with everyone discovering that the Mayor has gone missing.

=== Act 2 ===
The Mayor is spotted hiding behind the statue of San Crispino, patron saint of the village, hiding from everyone and especially Ortensia, his wife. Because of his allergy to candles he's almost found out by Consolazione, whom he tricks pretending to be the voice of San Crispino. Silvestro starts to board everyone on the ark that night, when Clementina arrives to declare her love for him ("Peccato che sia peccato, reprise"), but he dismisses her because he has to remain celibate due to his ecclesiastical vows ("Clementina"). In a moment of weakness Silvestro kisses Clementina and confesses this to God, who shares to be against celibacy as well, as his "closest collaborators" should be the first to be able to marry and have children. After the flood Silvestro will be able to be with Clementina.

Toto and Consolazione are getting married ("Ti voglio"), when the Mayor is found and kept in the canonica. The ark is ready to leave, but the cardinal suddenly arrives, trying to convince the villagers not to believe in Silvestro and get off the ark.

The flood starts and everyone tries to get back on the ark, but in vain. Silvestro asks God to stop the rain and save everyone, to which request God reluctantly says yes. Everyone is celebrating with a big meal and they add a place at the table for God, joining them in the shape of a dove ("Aggiungi un posto a tavola - finale").

== Musical numbers ==
=== Act I ===
- Aggiungi un posto a tavola
- Peccato che sia peccato
- Sono calmo
- Concerto per prete e campane
- Buttalo via
- Notte da non dormire
- Consolazione
- Notte da non dormire (reprise)
- L'amore secondo me
- Una formica è solo una formica

=== Act II ===
- La ballata di San Crispino
- Peccato che sia peccato (reprise)
- Clementina
- Ti voglio
- Quando l'arca si fermerà
- L'amore secondo me (reprise)
- Aggiungi un posto a tavola (finale)

== Principal casts ==
Characters	1st Italian Edition	Madrid	Argentina	3rd Italian Edition	Mexico	8th Italian Edition
Characters	1974	1977	1979	1990	2007	2024
Don Silvestro	Johnny Dorelli	Lorenzo Valverde	José Ángel Trelles	Johnny Dorelli	Jaime Camil Ernesto D'Alessio	Giovanni Scifoni
Consolazione	Bice Valori	Lia Uya	Graciela Pal	Alida Chelli	Maria Filippini	Lorella Cuccarini
Mayor Crispino	Paolo Panelli	Franz Johan		Carlo Croccolo	Patrick Castillo	Marco Simeoli
Clementina	Daniela Goggi	María Elías	Vicky Buchino	Tania Piattella	Maria Ines Guerra	Sofia Panizzi
Toto	Ugo Maria Morosi	Manuel Zarzo	Charly Diez Gómez	Adriano Pappalardo		Francesco Zaccaro
Ortensia	Christy	Josefina Güell		Christy		Francesca Nunzi
Cardinale	Carlo Piantadosi	Franco Ricchio		Carlo Piantadosi		Alessandro Di Giulio
God's voice	Renato Turi	José Guardiola	Luis Tasca	Riccardo Garrone		Enzo Garinei

== International productions ==
=== Spain ===
A Spanish production of the show was staged in 1977 at the Teatro Monumental of Madrid with the same crew of the Italian version, Giulio Coltellacci for scenography and costumes, Gino Landi was the choreographer and Garinei and Giovannini directed the show. In the cast Franz Johan as the Mayor, Crispín, Lia Uya as Consuelo (Consolazione), Lorenzo Valverde as Don Silvestre (Don Silvestro), Manuel Zarzo as Totó, María Elías as Clementina, Josefina Güell as Hortensia (Ortensia), Franco Ricchio as the Cardinale and José Guardiola as the voice of God.

Two more versions were produced in Spain, in 1995 at the Teatro Calderón in Madrid, led by Carlos Marín as Don Silvestre, and one in 2004 in Valencia with Gisela, Paco Morales, Mamen García and José Luis Gago.

=== Mexico ===
Known as El diluvio que viene (The Coming Deluge), it premiered in 1977 and lasted until 1981, with over 1,800 performances. Between its actors, Manolo Fabregas led the cast as Don Silvestro.

The cast of the more recent version of the show in 2007 included Jaime Camil as Don Silvestre, María Filippini as Consuelo (Consolazione), Maria Ines Guerra in the role of Clementina and Patrick Castillo, who played the same role in the original version, as the Mayor. This version of the show played at the theater of San Rafael. Camil was then replaced by Ernesto D'Alessio.

The Association of Theatre Critics and Journalists XXV awarded María Inés Guerra as Best Actress in a Musical for her role as Clementina, she also won a "Bravo Award" in the same category. The show also won the "Lady of Victory Award" (2007) for Foreign Musical, Best Ensemble and Musical Co-actor (Patricio Castillo), Newcomer (Enrique de la Riva), Co-actriz (Mary Filippini), Actor in a Musical (Jaime Camil). El Diluvio que Viene closed after a great success after eight months and 2,639 performances.
