= Estela Raval =

Argentine singer

- Born: Palma Nicolina Ravallo; 19 May 1929; Buenos Aires, Argentina
- Died: 6 June 2012 (aged 83); Buenos Aires, Argentina
- Occupation: Singer

Palma Nicolina Ravallo (19 May 1929 – 6 June 2012), better known as Estela Raval, was one of the first Argentine singer of pop latino back to the 1950s. She was accompanied by a band called The 5 Latinos.

Raval was the lead in the musical Excitante. In the musical she showed her talented voice, she sang in the theatre show as of the 1st cycle. She was being replaced by Spanish singer and actress Carmen Flores, sister of the late Lola Flores, for the third cycle being that Raval was battling cancer. She later returned to her place as of March. Estela Raval died on 6 June 2012 in Buenos Aires.

Raval recorded a Spanish version of Édith Piaf's Hymne à l'amour.
