= Celina Rucci =

Argentine vedette, actress and model (born 1972)

- Born: Maria Celina Rucci; October 9, 1972 (age 53); Buenos Aires, Argentina
- Occupations: vedette and actress
- Modeling information
- Height: 1.79 m (5 ft 10 1/2 in)
- Eye color: Brown

Maria Celina Rucci (born October 9, 1972 in Buenos Aires) is an Argentine vedette, actress and model. She was a Playboy Playmate and the winner of Bailando por un Sueño 2007. Rucci was married to Claudio Minnicelli; she has a son and two adopted daughters.

== Radio ==
- Plumas y Lentejuelas (2006) "La Fonola" LRA Radio Nacional (AM 870)
