= Claudia Albertario =

Argentine model, vedette and actress

- Born: Claudia Patricia Albertario; May 16, 1977 (age 49); Buenos Aires, Argentina
- Occupations: Actress; model; vedette; bailarina
- Modeling information
- Height: 1.66 m (5 ft 5 1/2 in)

Claudia Albertario (Spanish pronunciation: [ˈklawðja alβeɾˈtaɾjo]; born May 16, 1977) is an Argentine model, vedette and actress of theatre, television and film. Her notable credits include Amigovios (1995), Como pan caliente (1996), Montaña rusa, otra vuelta (1997), Chiquititas (1997–1999), Gasoleros (1998 and 1999), and Verano del '98 (1998–2001). She also appeared on Dancing on Ice around the world.

== Theatre ==
- Actrices: 2020, Teatro 8, Miami, Florida, USA
- Histeriotipos: 2018, Teatro 8, Miami, FLorida, USA
- Bajo Terapia: 2016–2017, Teatro 8, Miami, Florida, USA
- Las Novias de Travolta: 2015, Teatro 8, Miami, Florida, USA
- Aquellas Cabareteras: 2014, micromusical, Miami, Florida, USA, Microteatro Centro Cultural Español.
- Fiestisima: 2012–2013, Music Hall Teatral Marplatence theater season, occupied the place where head company with Fernando Ramirez, Charly, Estela Ventura, Sebastian Pol, and Mariana Petraca.
- Barbierísima: 2011-2012: She was in Barbieri's theatre show Barbierísima alongside Bravísima's dancing vedettes, Andrea Estévez and Andrea Ghidone, the three being the leading vedettes in the musical. Also in the show were Carmen Barbieri, Zulma Faiad, Germán Krauss and Beto César as the biggest figures in the show. The musical holds over 40 figures.
- Shangay: 2011, Chacarerean theater presented a different work, written, acted, and directed by Jose Maria Muscari, one of the most eccentric directors; a contemporary black comedy. Cast: Jose Maria Muscari, Chunchuna Villafañe, Nicolas Pauls, Claudia Albertario and Eunice Castro.
- Pasion: 2009–2010, two successful seasons of a sitcom starring German Kraus, Dario Lopilato, Stella Maris Lanzani, and Claudia Albertario. Cast: Andrea Esteves and Luli Drosdek. Written by Sergio Marcos.
- Una Familia Poco Normal: 2008, a comedy of Gerardo Sofovich, Moria Casan starred alongside one of the greatest artists of the Argentina scene. Cast: Toti Ciliberto, Claudia Albertario, Moria Casan, Viviana Canosa, Miguel Jordan, Rolo Puente, Alvaro Navia and Juana Repetto.
- La Revista de San Luis: 2007, music hall. Cast: Gino Reni, Claudia ALbertario, and Marixa Balli.
- Mi tio es un travieso: 2006, Mariano Iudica, Candilejas Theater, Carlos Paz. Cast: Rolo Puente, Claudia Albertario, Mariano Iudica, Betina Capetillo, Victor Collino, and Tamara Paganini. Carlos Award for Best Comedy Actress.
- El Pintor: 2005, comedy with wit by Donald Churchill. Starring Alberto Martin, Claudia Albertario and Carolina Papaleo. Directed by Carlos Evaristo.
- La Sirenita: 2005, children's musical, national tour. Claudia Albertatio.
- El fondo puede esperar: 2004, national tour, music hall. Cast: Nito Artaza, Claudia Albertario, and Maria Eugenia Rito.
- Vengo por el aviso: 2004, written by Marc Camoletti. Cast: Norma Pons, Rodolfo Ranni, Maria Fernanda Callejon, Claudia Albertario, Campi, Claudio Morgado, Laura Cymer and Eduardo Carrera. Theater Astral and National Tour. Directed by Carlos Evaristo.
- La corte suprema de la risa: 2003, Carlos Paz. Cast: Tristan, Yanina Zilly, Claudia Albertario, and Juan Acosta. Written by Camblor.
- Atrapados por la risa: 2002, music hall, choreography by Flavio Mendoza. Cast: Sergio Gonal, Claudia Albertario, Juan Acosta, and Flavio Mendoza. Theater Carreras, Mar del Plata.

== Television ==
Albertario is currently participating in the reality diving competition Celebrity Splash!.

- Inconquistable corazón (1994)
- Amigovios (1995)
- Como pan caliente (1996)
- Montaña rusa, otra vuelta (1997)
- Ricos y famosos (1997-1998)
- Chiquititas (1997-1999)
- Gasoleros (1998-1999)
- Muñeca brava (1998-1999)
- Verano del '98 (1998-2001)
- Teleshow internacional (2000)
- Primicias (2000)
- El show creativo (2000)
- Delirium Tremens (2000)
- La movida del verano (2000)
- Fiesta de la Reina del Mar (2000)
- Poné a Francella (2001 - 2002)
- Franstrack (2003)
- Los machos (2004)
- Pensionados (2004)
- La niñera (2004)
- Los Roldán (2005)
- Casados con hijos (2005-2006)
- Quien es el jefe (2005)
- Decisiones (United States) (2006)
- Amas de casa desesperadas (Mexico) (2007)
- Amor mío (Mexico) (2007)
- No hay dos sin tres (2007)
- Bailando por un sueño (2007)
- Patinando por un sueño (2007)
- Socias (2008)
- Valentino el argentino (2008)
- Patinando por un sueño (2008)
- Cantando por un sueño (2012)
- Intrusos en la televisión (Chile) (2012)
- En portada (Chile) (2012)
- Alfombra roja (Chile) (2012)
- Sin Dios ni late (Chile) (2012)
- Celebrity Splash (2013)
- Sres. Papis (2014)
- Eva La Trailera (2016), Telemundo, Miami, USA

Reality shows
Year	Title	Role	Notes
2007	Bailando por un sueño 2007	Contestant remplacing Juana Repetto	
2007	Patinando por un sueño 2007	Contestant	12th eliminated
2008	Patinando por un sueño 2008	Contestant remplacing Nadia Epstein	
2012	Cantando 2012	Contestant	1st eliminated
2013	Celebrity Splash!	Contestant	Eliminated in Round 2 – Part 1
2023	The Challenge Argentina: El Desafío	Contestant	6th finalist
2023	The Challenge: World Championship	Contestant	1st eliminated
