= Reina Reech =

Austrian-Argentine actress, dancer, singer, choreographer, producer and creative director

- Born: Reina Cristina Maurín Lasausse; February 19, 1958 (age 68); Vienna, Austria
- Occupations: actress, dancer, producer, creative director
- Years active: 1976–present
- Spouse(s): Nicolas Repetto (m. 1986–1992) (divorced); Pablo Lena (m. 1995–2000) (divorced)
- Children: 2

Reina Reech (born Reina Cristina Maurín Lasausse; 19 February 1958) is an Austrian Argentine actress, dancer, singer, choreographer, producer, and creative director. She is a naturalised Argentine and is a known Argentine vedette.

== Career ==
Reina Reech studied classical dance, but the field started in show business as a dancer revue. Over the years became a showgirl in various "magazines" in Buenos Aires. In film-starred in seven films from Argentina, but always in supporting roles during the 80's.

101 Dalmatians in 1999 was on stage, playing the role of the villainous Cruella de Vil, with great success and great performance. Since 2000 was an actress and choreographer in several musicals and revue. On television children's program led the Queen's Colours.

== Filmography ==
- ¡Yo También Tengo Fiaca! (1978)
- Expertos En Pinchazos (1979)
- Las Muñecas Que Hacen ¡Pum! (1979)
- El Poder De La Censura (1983)
- Todo o Nada (1984)
- Los Gatos (Prostitución De Alto Nivel) (1985)
- Las Minas De Salomón Rey (1986)
- 102 Dalmatians (2000)... Spanish dubbing at Cruella de Vil

== Television ==
- Amo Y Señor (1984)
- Solo Un Hombre (1985)
- Valeria (1987)
- Colores (1990)
- Reina En Colores (1993–1995)
- Colores en el Mar (1996)
- RequeteReina (1997)
- Reina En Verano (1998)
- Reina 2001 (1999)
- Son amores (2002)
- Generación Pop (2003)
- Tres Son Multitud (2003)
- Los pensionados (2004)
- Sos mi vida (2006)
- Lalola (2007)

=== TV Producer ===
- Marque El 13 (1990)
- Chocolate Club 13 (1990)
- Fax (1991)
- Bosque Chocolate (1994/ 1995)
- Veraneando En Colores (1996)
- Caramelito Y Vos (1999)
- Generación Pop (2003)

=== TV Other appearances ===
- La Peluqueria De Don Mateo (1982)
- Stress (1989)
- Tato De América (1992)
- Bailando Por Un Sueño I (2006)
- Bailando Por Un Sueño III (2007)
- Patinando Por Un Sueño I (2007)
- Patinando Por Un Sueño II (2008)
- Bailando Por Un Sueño Kids (2009)
- El Musical De Tus Sueños (2009)
- Bailando 2010 (2010)

== Theatre ==
- Todos Somos Star (1978)
- La Historia Del Siete (1979)
- El Champán Las Pone Mimosas (1982)
- Entretelones (1983)
- Tributo (1985)
- El Maipo Es El Maipo Y Gasalla Es Gasalla (1987)
- Reina En Colores (1993)
- Reina Y Su Muñeca En Colores (1993)
- Bailando En Colores (1994)
- Colores En El Mar (1995)
- Colores En El Mar (1995)
- Yo Soy Colores (1995)
- Yo Soy Colores (1995)
- La Familia De Colores (1996)
- En vivo y En llamas (1999)
- 101 Dálmatas (2000)
- El Ultimo De Los Amantes Ardientes (2001)
- Son Amores (2002)
- Taxi II (2003)
- Inolvidable (2006)
- Rumores (2010)

== Theatre Producer ==
- Inolvidable (2006)
- Irresistible (2007)
- Incomparable (2008)
- Deslumbrante (2009)
- La revista de Buenos Aires (2010)

== Discography ==
- Reina En Colores (1993)
- Reina Y Su Muñeca En Colores (1993)
- Bailando En Colores (1994)
- Yo Soy Colores (1995)
- Lo Mejor De Colores (1995)
- La Familia De Colores (1996)
- Esencia Infinita (1998)
- Esto Es Barbaro – Grandes Exitos (1999)
- 101 Dálmatas (2000)

=== Producer Discography ===
- Cuentos Mágicos De Doña Araña (1994)
- Miau Miau – El Gato Montés (1995)
- Caramelito Y Vos (1999)
- Scratch 8 (2003)

== Videography ==
- Reina En Colores – Todos Los Musicales De La Tele (1993)
- Reina Y Su Muñeca En Colores (1994)
- Colores En El Mar (1995)
