= Coki Ramírez =

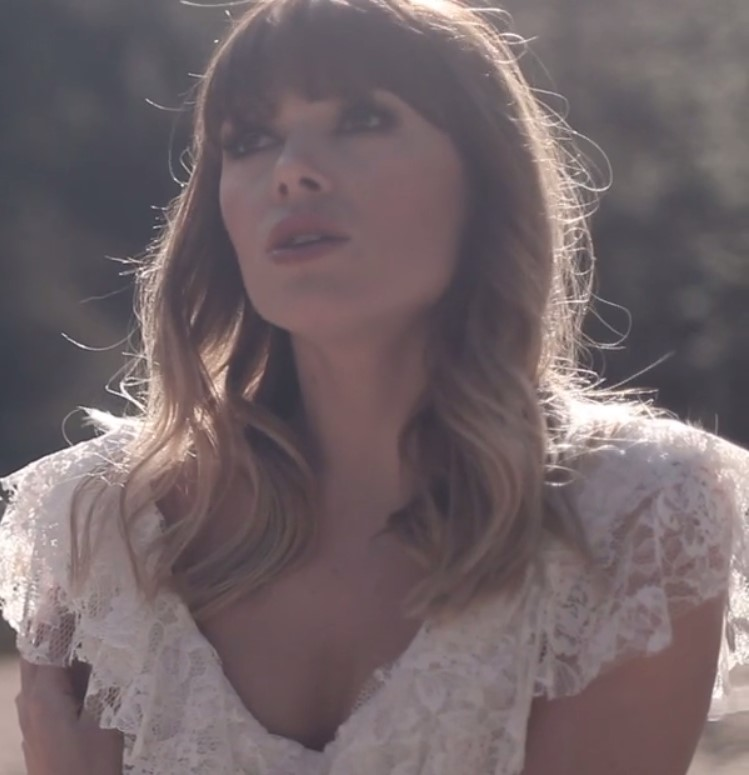
- Coki Ramírez in 2013.

Background information
- Born: Patricia Silvana Ramírez Ter Hart; February 6, 1980 (age 46)
- Origin: Córdoba, Argentina
- Genres: Pop, pop rock, Latin pop
- Occupations: Singer, Model and Actress.
- Instrument: Vocals
- Years active: 2002—present
- Label: Sony BMG

Patricia Silvana Ramírez Ter Hart (Spanish pronunciation: [ˈkoki raˈmiɾes]; born in Córdoba (Argentina) on February 6, 1980), best known as Coki Ramírez, is a singer, model and actress from Argentina.

== Biography ==
Patricia Ramírez, was born on February 6, 1980, in the Barrio Urca neighbourhood of Córdoba, Argentina, where she spent her childhood and adolescence. Much of her early life was spent at her parents' deli where she played with her sisters and pretended to build houses with Coca-Cola crates. This resulted in her nickname Coki.

Coki Ramírez's family is of German origin. She is the daughter of Juan Ramírez and Ana Ter Hart. She has two twin sisters called Gabriela and María Fernánda. Her family members attest that from an early age she demonstrated an undeniable passion for music. Throughout her teen years Coki was the star of all her family gatherings, where she received a great deal of support from her loved ones on account of her musical abilities. After high school she chose to pursue a musical career while also studying to become a dental prosthetist.

== Musical and Television career ==
Her first experiences as a singer were in Córdoba ballrooms where she played songs in English. Coki was determined to succeed and decided to try her luck in Chile. With a career that lasted surprisingly, Coki Ramírez was called early by Chilean singer Alberto Plaza to accompany him on a tour of Latin America as part of its chorus section. So, ironically, she managed to succeed in a foreign musical before triumphing in her own.

However, Plaza was not the only international singer who Coki Ramírez made stage appearances with. She also collaborated with Ricardo Montaner, Julio Iglesias, Noel Schajris, Aleks Syntek, Valeria Lynch, Los Nocheros, Fito Paez and many more. In 2018 she collaborated with the Chilean singer Pablo Herrera.

In 2007, she released his first album, called Presente.

The true rise to fame of Patricia Coki Ramírez took place on the night of August 3, 2010, when she was invited by the boxer Fabio Moli to the television show Bailando por un Sueño (Argentina), led by Marcelo Tinelli. She would become that week's leading participant in the show. In the following months the young singer appeared on almost every television media in Argentina. As a result of her new-found fame, she was chosen as a replacement for Sabrina Rojas and Lola Ponce in Bailando por un Sueño (Argentina) 2010.

In 2011 she again participated in Bailando por un Sueño (Argentina) where she was one of the revelations and incredibly made it to the semifinals, losing in the telephone vote to Hernan Piquín and Noelia Pompa. In February, the first guest was famous for singing in the new reality of Ideas del Sur, Soñando por Cantar, despite the problems that occurred in the satellite channel signal, El Trece could present live television his CD can. In May, she participated in the third chapter of concubines in the character of Coka, a neighbor of Peter «Peter» Alfonso, who comes from José Mármol, Buenos Aires.

In 2012 she released her second album titled Se Puede, in which she collaborated with various Argentine artists. The purchase of each CD benefits the «Acercar» association, which offers aid to children with various disabilities. In July, Coki Ramírez gave an intimate concert in Buenos Aires, during which she recorded two video clips that will be featured in Argentina and other countries. In November, Coki participated in the successful novel Dulce amor (telenovela), where she played a former girlfriend of Stubborn, called Cati.The character played by Hernán Estevanez (Sebastián Estevanez cousin), who owns the bar in the series. In December, the new video premiere of Coki «Tu ya no estás» in Quiero música en mi idioma.

=== Model ===
Before graduating from dental prosthetist she worked as a model and paraded in Chile and other countries. In 2008, she designed her own sportswear brand called 351.

In 2011, while in Showmatch, she participated as a model in some Claudio Cosano parades, designer clothing, such as «Cuidá tu Corazón» opening BAAM 2011. After was in Moda Show de Mar del Plata. She also participated in a fashion show, called El Desfile del Show.

In 2012 she walked again in Moda Show de Mar del Plata, which was attended by Mirtha Legrand. Also paraded alongside Nicole Neumann in BAAM 2012. In July she posed for a photo campaign for a brand of shoes production Green and Black for the summer campaign 2013. In August 2012 she participated in the parade Santiago Fashion Look which ended with a musical show. In 2013, while in the play Los Grimaldi, she established herself as «La Chica del Verano» with 49.19% of the votes, a total of 509,171 people who chose to Coki.

== Discography ==
- 2007 : Presente.
- 2012 : Se Puede.

== Filmography ==
=== Television ===
Year	Title	Channel	Role
2010	Bailando 2010	El Trece, Argentina	Herself/Participant-replacement for Sabrina Rojas and Lola Ponce.
2010	Demoliendo teles	El Trece, Argentina	Participant/Singer
2011	Bailando 2011	El Trece, Argentina	Participant-Semifinalist
2011	Quiero música en mi idioma	Channel	Host TV/Participant
2011	El desfile del Show	El Trece, Argentina	Participant/Model
2011	Cantando 2011	El Trece, Argentina	Participant/Singer
2011	Sábado Show	El Trece, Argentina	Participant/Singer
2012	Soñando por Cantar	El Trece, Argentina	Participant/Singer
2012	Quiero música en mi idioma	Channel	Host TV/Participant
2012	Sabado Show	El Trece, Argentina	Participant/Singer
2012	Concubinos (Chapter #3)	El Trece, Argentina	Actress ("Coka")
2012	Gracias por venir	Telefé, Argentina	Participant/Singer
2012	Am, Antes del Mediodia	Telefé, Argentina	Guest/Panelist
2012	La pelu	Telefé, Argentina	Participant/Singer
2012	Antes de que sea Tarde	América 2, Argentina	Participant/Singer
2012	Prende y apaga	Todo Noticias, Channel	Participant/Singer
2012	Recital en Vivo	Magazine, Channel	Singer
2012	Dulce amor (telenovela)	Telefé, Argentina	Actress ("Cati")
2013	Los Grimaldi	Canal 9, Argentina	Actress/Singer
2013	Soñando por Cantar	El Trece, Argentina	Participant/Singer

== Theatre ==
Year	Building	Role
2012 - 2013	Los Grimaldi	Patricia Linares
