= Andrea Ghidone =

Uruguayan vedette, fashion model, professional dancer and actress

- Occupations: Vedette, dancer, model, actress, cabaret star
- Children: Natacha Delmonte Ghidone (b. Montevideo, 2006)

Andrea Ghidone Segundo is a Uruguayan vedette, fashion model, professional dancer and actress of theater and television known for her work in Argentina.

== Career ==
Ghidone is known for her work with the veteran stand-up comedian and actress, Carmen Barbieri, she has worked for Barbieri's theater company and has been in all of her musicals since late-2008: Vedettísima in 2009; Fantástica in 2010; Bravísima in 2011; Barbierísima in 2012; Escándalosas in 2013. She has also modeled for Maxim's June 2010 cover in Argentina.

Ghidone participated in the sixth season of Bailando por un Sueño in 2010 (Bailando is the Argentine version of Dancing With The Stars). She finished in 18th place losing to the boxer, Fabio "La Mole" Moli.

== 2008-2013: Artistic career ==
Year	Show	Notes	Genre
2008-2009	Vedettísima	Outstanding Dancer; Half-Vedette	Theater revue
2009-2010	Fantástica	3rd Vedette 2nd Actress - Dancer	Theater revue
2010	Bailando 2010	12° post	TV competition
2010-2011	Bravísima	2nd Vedette 2nd Actress - Dancer	Theater revue
2011	Bailando 2011	Replacement	TV competition
2011-2012	Barbierísima	Co-Lead Vedette Monologist - Lead Dancer	Theater revue
2012–2013	Escándalosas	1st Vedette Lead Acrobat-Dancer and Actress	Theater revue
2013	Celebrity Splash	Quarters of finals 1 Semifinals 2	TV competition
2013	Tango encantado	Star Dancer	Tango Show
2013–2014	Sé infiel y no mires con quién	Supporting Actress	Theater comedy
2014–present	Señor Tango	Star Dancer	Tango Show

=== Vedettísima ===
In 2008 Ghidone was signed into Carmen Barbieri's musical Vedettísima. The show featured Carmen Barbieri, Los Nocheros, Santiago Bal, María Eugenia Ritó, Tristán, Silvina Luna, Matías Alé, el mago Juan Durán, Alejandro Gallego, Silvina Escudero and Estefanía Bacca. This was Ghidone's first big performance in theatre.

=== Fantástica ===
In late-2009 and most of 2010 Ghidone at the time was a vedette in Carmen Barbieri's musical Fantástica which had a hugh cast. The musical starred Carmen Barbieri, Santiago Bal, Tristán, Rolo Puente, Alberto Martin, Mónica Farro, Daniela Cardone, Matías Alé, Silvina Escudero, Paola Miranda, Gaby Figueroa, Mariana "Niña Loly" Antoniale, Pamela Sosa, Rocío Marengo, Alicia Barcelo, Estefanía Bacca, Damian, Duarte, Matías Sayago, Leandro Angelo, Rodrigo Escobar & Cristian Ponce. In 2010 the musical won three Estrella de Mar awards: best magazine; best directing to Javier Faroni; best costumes to "Gaby Girl's". The show was produced and writing by Barbieri's then spouse Santiago Bal and directed-produced by Faroni.

==== Backstage Feud ====
In January 2010, media reports bursted about a supposed fight between Ghidone and Silvina Escudero in the musicals finally. apparently Ghidone was preparing herself for the finale, when Escudero rushed along a narrow corridor to be the first one to appear on stage. Silvina "...pushed her (Ghidone) and staved her in the arm with her nails...", Ghidone instantly responded, "If you don’t let go of me I’ll rip your arm off!", paving the way for an exchange of insults, and even an attempt of punching by Ghidone, but the vedettes around them apparently stopped them, others say that the conflict got more physical.

=== Bailando 2010 ===
In 2010 Ghidone and professional dance partner Emanuel González participated in Bailando por un Sueño (Argentina) a reality dance competition cast by celebs. Bailando is the Argentine version of Dancing With The Stars. As a dancer Ghidone was a frontrunner in the competition and had the highest score on the Pole dance round with a perfect (50) and in Merengue with (48) along with Silvina Escudero. She was the 18th person to leave the competition after getting a (30) in the Dancing in the rain round and losing in the phone bin by the 26.97% of the public vote to Argentine Boxer, Fabio "La Mole" Moli who scored a 73.03%. Fabio would later on win the competition itself by the 50.24% of the votes leaving the runner-up Paula Chaves with the 49.76% of the public vote.

=== Bravísima ===
In 2010 Ghidone was signed into Carmen Barbieri's new musical Bravísima. The musical was headed by Argentine vedette, Carmen Barbieri alongside Matías Alé, Mónica Farro, Belén Francese, Toti Ciliberto, Dominique Pestañas, Emiliano Rella & Andrea Estévez as well as Ghidone. In the magazine she played, acting and dancing, as Marilyn Monroe. She would also act as a papergirl and as Cleopatra. The musical was writing and directed by Santiago Bal and produced by Javier Faroni. The cast and musical tour all Argentina and parts of Uruguay. Bravísima won one Estrella de Mar for best revue show of the year, also Carmen Barbieri won the award for best female stand-up comedian for her work in the magazine.

=== Bailando 2011 ===
In 2011 Ghidone would return in the next season but as a replacement for the Paraguayan model, Larissa Riquelme who had a knee injury. She replaced Riquelme for an elimination in which she was saved by the judges and was supported by Riquelme. She would remain as a replacement for a gala been that Riquelme was still injured. The Paraguayan model would later return for the next gala.

=== Barbierísima ===
In late-2011 she debuted in Barbieri's theatre show Barbierísima alongside Zulma Faiad, Germán Krauss, Beto César, Fernando Ramírez, Andrea Estévez, Claudia Albertario, Gabriela Mandato, Adriana "Leona" Barrientos, Emiliano Rella, Rodrigo Lussich, Daniel Ambrosino, Donald, Silvina Scheffler, Rubén Matos, Juan Marcelo, Victoria Xipolitakis, Hernán Cabanas, Dominique Pestaña, Ivanna Paliotti, Tamara Gala, Noelia Ramella, Gisela Molinero and a hugh body of dancers. She stud as a 1st vedette in the musical magazine alongside Andrea Estévez & Claudia Albertario. The revue show won two Estrellas de Mar: best magazine and best costumes.

=== Escándalosas ===
On 4 September 2012, the actress-dancer was confirmed as a lead figure in Barbieri's musical named Escandalosas (initially being named travestísima and then Escándalosa) for 2012-13 summer theatrical season. The revue is led by Moria Casán and Carmen Barbieri. Many artist were rumored to act in the magazine, like: Aníbal Pachano, Beto César, Adabel Guerrero, Andrea Estévez, Claudia Albertario, Virginia Gallardo, Stefanía & Victoria Xipolitakis, Federico Bal, Marina Calabró, Mariana Jacazzio, Julián Labruna, Lorena Liggi, Cristian U and Soledad Cescato. The magazine was scheduled to debut on 3 December in the Atlas theater of Mar del Plata, in Avenue Luro. Produced and directed by Carmen Barbieri, Carlos Moreno and Javier Faroni. Finally the musical company decided to rush the theatre show's debut to 1 December with the cast being Carmen Barbieri & Moria Casán, Ghidone, Beto César, twin sisters Vicky & Stefi Xipolitakis, Mariana Jacazzio, Federico Bal, Lorena Liggi, Soledad Cescato and Julián Labruna. The revue was nominated for six awards: Best Costumes (Gaby Girl's), Best Artistic Production (Javier Faroni), Female Revelation (Gisela Lepio), Male Revelation (Martín Sipicki) and Best Female Comedian (Carmen Barbieri & Moria Casán). They won three awards: Best Artistic Production (Javier Faroni), Male Revelation (Martín Sipicki) and a special recognition award as a revue show. The musical is planned to run until 2015, Barbieri and Casán have already made it official and signed.

This would be Ghidone's last season in a theatrical magazine.

==== Accident ====
On 6 January 2013, while performing one of her acrobatic dance numbers, "The Asiatic Number", Ghidone fell from her rings at a height of seven to eight feet. She was seen by a doctor backstage and was sent to the hospital at the close of her number, where many test were made.

On 22 January Ghidone re-debuted in the magazine after her recovery and continues performing the acrobatic number. Her numbers were being covered by fellow vedette, Lorena Liggi.

== 2012–present : Television career & comedy Theatre ==
In 2012 Ghidone made her small screen debut in the Argentine telenovela, "Sweet love". That same year she made a special appearance in the miniseries, "Boyando".

After finishing her contract with the theatre company, Javier Production's the Uruguayan actress went on to perform as a star performer in a small tango show named "Tango encantado" in 2013.

In early 2013 Ghidone commented that she was planning on retiring from on her theatrical career in revues and music halls to focus on her musical comedy, theatre drama and screen acting career.

In 2013 she participated in the reality diving competition, Celebrity Splash!. She was eliminated in the second quarterfinals but later on returned, being called back. She was ultimately eliminated on the show's semifinal round.

Ghidone was later a supporting actress in the stage comedy, "Sé infiel y no mires con quién" in Mar del Plata. The comedy is an adaptation of a play originated in London and created by Ray Cooney and John Chapman. Javier Faroni is the producer and the comedy is led by Fabián Gianola, Nicolás Scarpino and Carolina Papaleo. Other stars in the show are Matías Alé, Celina Rucci, Alejandro Muller, Dallys Ferreira and Betty Villar. The comedy started on 21 December of 2013. In June 2014 Ghidone decided to quit the comedy while it was touring around Latinamerica and join Señor Tango as one of its star dancers.

== Sources ==
- Da Silva Villarrubia, Santiago Katriel. "Vedettepedia: Andrea Ghidone, la rubia oriental". Fernanda Iglesias (in Spanish). Lanacion.com.ar. Archived from the original on 10 February 2013.
