= Cantando 2011 =

Third season of the Argentine television series Cantando por un Sueño

- Presented by: José María Listorti; Denise Dumas
- Country of origin: Argentina

Production
- Running time: 120 mins. (approx.)

Original release
- Network: El Trece
- Release: May 7 – December 18, 2011

Related
- Cantando 2007

Cantando 2011 is the third season of Cantando por un Sueño, and the first season to be aired as an independent show, and not like a segment of Showmatch. It premiered on May 7, 2011, hosted by José María Listorti and Denise Dumas.

Marcelo Tinelli continued as the host of Bailando por un Sueño, the only competition included on Showmatch, unlike 2006 and 2007, when Cantando por un Sueño was a part of the show too, and was hosted by Tinelli.

The judges for this season were singer Valeria Lynch, music producer Óscar Mediavilla, journalist Marcelo Polino, and singer Patricia Sosa. Singer Paz Martínez and artistic director Reina Reech served as replacements during some weeks of the show.

Sixteen couples started the competition, and on December 18, 2011, singer Patricio Giménez (brother of Susana Giménez) and professional singer and partner Priscila Juárez, were crowned as the winners, against comedian Álvaro Navia and Ana Paula Rodríguez, during the finale.

Meanwhile, the semi-finalists during this season were model and comedian Belén Francese and Augusto Álvarez, and former contestants of the first season of Soñando por Bailar, Andrea López and Jonathan González. López and González were eliminated against Giménez and Juárez during the first semi-final, while Francese and Álvarez were eliminated against Navia and Rodríguez, during the second semi-final.

== Couples ==
Celebrity	Occupation	Professional Partner	Status
Daniel "Tota" Santillán	Former TV Host	Melissa Bustamante	Eliminated 1st by the 45.24%
Marcelo "Teto" Medina	Comedian & TV Host	Romina Rebecchi	Eliminated 2nd by the 40.19%
Carlos Perciavalle	actor	Loly Santa Coloma	Eliminated 3rd by the 47.39%
Gino Renni	actor	Lara Sambert	Eliminated 4th by the 48.50%
Jimena Monteverde	Chef & TV hostess	Emiliano Bernal	Eliminated 5th by the 47.80%
Anabela Ascar	Journalist & TV hostess	Emmanuel Casanova	Eliminated 6th by the 45.92%
Mariana "Loly" Antoniale	model	Mauro Bornancini	Eliminated 7th by the 36.70%
Sofía Pachano	Dancer & Anibal Pachano's Daughter	Juanchi Macedonio	Eliminated 8th by the 33.60%
Virginia Gallardo	Dancer & Vedette	Juanchi Macedonio	Eliminated 9th by the 46.50%
Sofía Zámolo	Model & TV hostess	Cristian Centurión	Eliminated 10th by the 38.88%
Paola Miranda	Singer & Vedette	Federico Moore	Eliminated 11th by the 12.69%
Florencia "Floppy" Tesouro	Vedette	Javier Olguín	Eliminated 12th by the 27.64%
Andrea López	Contestants of Soñando por Bailar 2011	Jonathan González	Semi-finalists by the 27.64%
Belén Francese	Model & Comedian	Augusto Álvarez	Semi-finalists by the 45.89%
Álvaro Navia	comedian	Ana Paula Rodríguez	Runners-up by the 48.05%
Patricio Giménez	Singer	Priscila Juárez	Winners by the 51.95%

== Scoring chart ==
Celebrity	Place	1	2	3	4	5	6	7	8	9	10	11	12	13
Patricio & Priscila	1st	32	28	25	25	28	32	22	27	28	27	25	5	7
Álvaro & Ana Paula	2nd	27	26	35	25	35	33	35	34	35	32	25	5	3
Belén & Augusto	3rd–4th	15	27	27	22	24	24	16	27	20	13	18	1	
Andrea & Jonathan	3rd–4th	27	29	30	31	20	26	28	27	28	27	34	1	
Florencia & Javier	5th	28	25	24	31	19	27	21	31	23	31	21		
Paola & Federico	6th	21	22	27	29	21	29	23	34	30	31	21		
Sofía Z. & Cristian	7th	24	23	28	28	20	24	30	36	26	23			
Virginia & Alejandro	8th	28	29	26	25	20	27	17	26	23				
Sofía P. & Juanchi	9th	30	29	21	27	35	24	21	19					
Loly & Mauro	10th	18	22	21	25	20	28	21						
Anabela & Emmanuel	11th	26	30	24	31	30	24							
Jimena & Emiliano	12th	19	22	18	19	21								
Gino & Laura	13th	31	27	34	25									
Carlos & Loly	14th	28	28	24										
Teto & Romina	15th	20	24											
Tota & Melissa	16th	15												

Red numbers indicate the lowest score for each week.
Green numbers indicate the highest score for each week.
indicates the couple eliminated that week.
indicates the couple was saved by the public.
indicates the couple was saved by the jury.
indicates the winning couple.
indicates the runner-up couple.
indicates the semi-finalists couples.

Round	best singer(s)	Best score	Worst singer(s)	Worst score
Round 1	Patricio Gimenez	32	Belén Francese; Daniel "Tota" Santillán	15
Round 2	Anabela Ascar	30	Paola Miranda; Mariana "Loly" Antoniale; Jimena Monteverde	22
Round 3	Álvaro Navia	35	Jimena Monteverde	18
Round 4	Andrea López; Anabela Ascar; Florencia "Floppy" Tesouro	31	Jimena Monteverde	19
Round 5	Álvaro Navia; Sofía Pachano	35	Florencia "Floppy" Tesouro	19
Round 6	Álvaro Navia	33	Anabela Ascar; Belén Francese; Sofía Pachano; Sofía Zámolo	24
Round 7	Álvaro Navia	35	Belén Francese	16
Round 8	Sofía Zámolo	36	Sofía Pachano	19
Round 9	Álvaro Navia	35	Belén Francese	20
Round 10	Álvaro Navia	32	Belén Francese	13
Round 11	Andrea López	34	Belén Francese	18

== Weekly scores and songs ==
=== Round 1 ===
Unless indicated otherwise, individual judges scores in the charts below (given in parentheses) are listed in this order from left to right: Patricia Sosa, Marcelo Polino, Óscar Mediavilla, Valeria Lynch.

Key
– The couple was saved by the judges
– The couple was saved by the public vote
– The couple was eliminated

Secret vote: Valeria Lynch

Running order

Date	Couple	Score	Song(original artist)
May 7	Virginia & Alejandro	28 (9,5,6,8)	"Colgando en tus manos"(Carlos Baute & Marta Sánchez)
May 7	Álvaro & Ana Laura	27 (9,4,6,8)	"Vasos Vacíos"(Los Fabulosos Cadillacs)
May 7	Sofía Z. & Cristian	24 (7,4,6,7)	"Estoy Enamorada"(Thalía)
May 7	Jimena & Emiliano	19 (6,3,4,6)	"Mi Niña Bonita"(Chino & Nacho)
May 7	Carlos & Loly	28 (9,5,6,8)	"A Mi Manera"(Frank Sinatra)
May 7	Loly & Mauro	18 (4,3,5,6)	"Piel morena"(Thalía)
May 7	Patricio & Priscila	32 (10,6,8,8)	"What a Wonderful World"(Louis Armstrong)
May 14	Anabela & Emmanuel	26 (8,4,6,8)	"No me arrepiento de este amor"(Gilda)
May 14	Florencia & Javier	28 (8,4,7,9)	"Desesperada"(Marta Sánchez)
May 14	Tota & Melissa	15 (4,3,4,4)	"Te Amo"(Franco De Vita)
May 14	Belén & Augusto	15 (4,2,4,5)	"Lo que siento por ti"(Miranda!)
May 14	Paola & Federico	21 (5,4,6,6)	"Vivir lo nuestro"(Marc Anthony)
May 14	Sofía P. & Juanchi	30 (9,6,7,8)	"Total Eclipse of the Heart"(Bonnie Tyler)
May 14	Gino & Laura	31 (9,5,8,9)	"Mi historia entre tus dedos"(Gianluca Grignani)
May 14	Teto & Romina	20 (6,4,4,6)	"Llora, Me Llama"(Grupo Play)
May 14	Andrea & Jonathan	27 (8,5,6,8)	"Castillo Azul"(Ricardo Montaner)

=== Round 2 ===
Paz Martínez replaced Valeria Lynch, scoring the first five couples.

Secret vote: Patricia Sosa

Running order

Date	Couple	Score	Song (original artist)
May 21	Álvaro & Ana Laura	26 (7,4,7,8)	"Volver"(Ricardo Montaner)
May 21	Florencia & Javier	25 (6,4,7,8)	"No Me Ames"(Marc Anthony & Jennifer Lopez)
May 21	Carlos & Loly	28 (7,4,8,9)	"Chayanne"(Chayanne)
May 21	Virginia & Alejandro	28 (7,6,7,9)	"Me muero de amor"(Natalia Oreiro)
May 21	Patricio & Priscila	28 (8,5,8,7)	"Rescata mi corazón"(Manuel Wirtz)
May 21	Paola & Federico	22 (4,4,7,7)	"Me va a extrañar"(Ricardo Montaner)
May 28	Anabela & Emmanuel	30 (8,6,7,9)	"Fotografía"(Juanes & Nelly Furtado)
May 28	Loly & Mauro	22 (6,4,5,7)	"Y Yo Sigo Aquí"(Paulina Rubio)
May 28	Gino & Laura	27 (9,4,7,7)	"Llorarás por mí"(Chapa C)
May 28	Belén & Augusto	27 (7,6,6,8)	"Loca"(Shakira)
May 28	Teto & Romina	24 (7,5,4,8)	"Dime que no"(Ricardo Arjona)
May 28	Jimena & Emiliano	22 (6,5,4,7)	"Sin documentos"(Julieta Venegas)
May 28	Sofía Z. & Cristian	23 (7,4,5,7)	"Sweet Child o' Mine"(Guns N' Roses)
May 28	Andrea & Jonathan	29 (8,5,7,9)	"Algo Contigo"(Vicentico)
May 28	Sofía P. & Juanchi	29 (8,5,7,9)	"Sueños"(Diego Torres & Julieta Venegas)

=== Round 3 ===
Secret vote: Oscar Mediavilla

Running order

Date	Couple	Score	Song (original artist)
June 4	Virginia & Alejandro	26 (7,6,6,7)	"Para toda la vida"(Marcela Morelo)
June 4	Álvaro & Ana Laura	35 (9,8,8,10)	"¿Quién te quiere como yo?"(Carlos Baute)
June 4	Patricio & Priscila	25 (6,4,7,8)	"Resistiré"(David Bolzoni)
June 4	Florencia & Javier	24 (7,4,6,7)	"Mi enfermedad"(Fabiana Cantilo)
June 4	Andrea & Jonathan	30 (8,6,7,9)	"Eres Mi Religión"(Maná)
May 13	Jimena & Emiliano	18 (6,4,3,5)	"Hay que venir al sur"(Raffaella Carrà)
May 13	Anabela & Emmanuel	24 (6,4,6,8)	"Procura"(Chichí Peralta)
May 13	Sofía Z. & Cristian	28 (8,6,6,8)	"Entra en mi vida"(Sin Bandera)
May 13	Carlos & Loly	24 (7,4,6,7)	"Capullito de alelí"(Rafael Hernández Marín)
May 13	Belén & Augusto	27 (9,4,6,8)	"Se dice de mí"(Tita Merello)
May 13	Paola & Federico	27 (8,5,6,8)	"Cuando Me Enamoro"(Enrique Iglesias & Juan Luis Guerra)
May 13	Loly & Mauro	21 (5,3,6,7)	"Tren del cielo"(Soledad Pastorutti)
May 13	Sofía P. & Juanchi	21 (6,4,5,6)	"Pero Me Acuerdo de Ti"(Christina Aguilera)
May 13	Gino & Laura	33 (9,8,7,9)	"Otra com tu"(Eros Ramazzotti)

=== Round 4 ===
Secret vote: Patricia Sosa

Running order

Date	Couple	Score	Song (original artist)
June 18	Sofía Z. & Cristian	29 (8,5,7,9)	"Fuego de Noche, Nieve de Día"(Ricky Martin)
June 18	Patricio & Priscila	25 (6,4,6,9)	"She"(Elvis Costello)
June 18	Gino & Laura	25 (6,4,8,7)	"Notti magiche"(Gianna Nannini)
June 18	Andrea & Jonathan	31 (10,5,8,8)	"Por Amarte Así"(Cristian Castro)
June 25	Anabela & Emanuel	31 (9,5,8,9)	"Dulce condena"(Fabiana Cantilo)
June 25	Virginia & Gallardo	25 (9,4,5,7)	"Equivocada"(Thalía)
June 25	Florencia & Javier	31 (8,6,8,9)	"Sin miedo a nada"(Álex Ubago)
June 25	Jimena & Emiliano	19 (5,3,4,7)	"Ahora te puedes marchar"(Luis Miguel)
June 25	Belén & Augusto	22 (6,2,8,6)	"Livin' la Vida Loca"(Ricky Martin)
June 25	Sofía P. & Juanchi	27 (7,5,7,8)	"Tan Sólo Tú"(Franco De Vita & Alejandra Guzmán)
July 2	Alvaro & Ana Laura	25 (6,3,8,8)	"Un beso y un adiós"(Nino Bravo)
July 2	Loly & Mauro	25 (7,4,7,7)	"Solo se vive una vez"(Azúcar Moreno)
July 2	Paola & Federico	30 (9,5,7,9)	"Hoy"(Gloria Estefan)

=== Round 5 ===
Secret vote: Valeria Lynch

Running order

Date	Couple	Score	Song (original artist)
July 9	Anabela & Emanuel	30 (9,5,7,9)	"La vida es un carnaval"(Celia Cruz)
July 16	Alvaro & Ana Laura	35 (10,6,9,10)	"Persiana Americana"(Soda Stereo)
July 16	Andrea & Jonathan	20 (6,3,5,6)	"Nada de esto fue un error"(Coti)
July 16	Loly & Mauro	20 (6,3,5,6)	"Se me ha perdido un corazón"(Gilda)
July 16	Paola & Federico	21 (7,5,4,5)	"Burbujas de amor"(Juan Luis Guerra)
July 16	Sofía Z. & Cristian	20 (6,3,5,6)	"Entrégate"(Luis Miguel)
July 16	Florencia & Javier	19 (6,3,5,5)	"Caraluna"(Bacilos)
July 16	Sofía P. & Juanchi	35 (10,7,8,10)	"Somebody to Love"(Glee)
July 23	Virginia & Alejandro	20 (6,3,5,6)	"Inevitable"(Shakira)
July 23	Patricio & Priscila	28 (9,4,7,8)	"Honesty"(Billy Joel)
July 23	Belén & Augusto	24 (7,4,6,7)	"¿A quién le importa?"(Thalía)
July 23	Jimena & Emiliano	21 (5,3,6,7)	"La isla del sol"(El Símbolo)

=== Round 6 ===
- Mariana "Loly" Antoniale was replaced by Nazarena Vélez during this round.

Secret vote: Patricia Sosa

Running order

Date	Couple	Score	Song (original artist)
July 30	Sofía P. & Juanchi	24 (7,4,6,7)	"Lo dejaría todo" (Chayanne)
August 4	Andrea & Jonathan	26 (8,2,7,9)	"Vuelve" (Ricky Martin)
August 4	Belén & Augusto	24 (7,4,6,7)	"Estoy aquí" (Rosana)
August 4	Patricio & Priscila	32 (9,6,8,9)	"Todo mi amor" (Jaf)
August 4	Alvaro & Ana Laura	33 (9,5,9,10)	"Sólo un momento" (Vicentico)
July 23	Anabela & Emanuel	24 (6,3,7,8)	"Ave María" (David Bisbal)
July 23	Virgia & Alejandro	27 (8,4,7,8)	"Para un poco" (Ricardo Montaner)
July 23	Nazarena & Mauro	28 (7,6,8,7)	"Derroche" (Ana Belén)
July 23	Florencia & Javier	27 (7,4,8,8)	"Antes que ver el sol" (Coti)
July 23	Paola & Federico	29 (7,5,8,9)	"Te conozco" (Ricardo Arjona)
August 20	Sofía Z. & Cristian	24 (8,4,6,6)	"Tú" (Shakira)

=== Round 7 ===
Secret vote: Valeria Lynch

Running order

Date	Couple	Score	Song (original artist)
August 27	Alvaro & Ana Laura	35 (10,7,8,10)	"Fábula ancestral" (Manuel Mijares & Rocío Banquells)
August 27	Paola & Federico	23 (6,4,6,7)	"Costumbres Argentinas" (Los Abuelos de la Nada)
August 27	Patricio & Priscila	21 (6,3,6,6)	"Angels" (Robbie Williams)
August 27	Florencia & Javier	21 (6,3,6,6)	"Me arrepiento" (Alex Ubago)
August 27	Andrea & Jonathan	28 (7,4,8,9)	"Sólo importas tú" (Franco De Vita)
September 3	Virginia & Alejandro	17 (5,2,4,6)	"Te Quiero" (Flex)
September 3	Loly & Mauro	21 (6,4,5,6)	"Quiéreme" (Jean Carlos)
September 3	Belén & Augusto	16 (6,1,4,5)	"Provócame" (Chayanne)
September 3	Sofía P. & Juanchi	21 (6,3,6,6)	"My Heart Will Go On" (Celine Dion)
September 3	Sofía Z. & Cristian	30 (9,5,7,9)	"More Than Words" (Extreme)

=== Round 8 ===
- The couples performed with a special guest during this round.

Secret vote: Patricia Sosa

Running order

Date	Couple	Score	Song (original artist)
September 18	Virginia & Alejandro (with Juan Darthés)	26 (7,3,8,8)	"¿Y qué?" (Paz Martínez)
September 18	Sofía Z. & Cristian (with César Pueyrredón)	36 (10,8,9,9)	"Cuando amas a alguien" (César Pueyrredón)
September 18	Alvaro & Ana Laura (with José Vélez)	34 (10,6,9,9)	"Un año más" (José Vélez)
September 25	Florencia & Javier (with Jean Carlos)	31 (10,4,8,9)	"Quiéreme" (Jean Carlos)
September 25	Andrea & Jonathan (with Cae)	27 (9,3,7,8)	"Tu recuerdo" (Cae)
September 25	Belén & Augusto (with Leo García)	27 (8,3,7,9)	"Dos días en la vida" (Fito Páez)
October 2	Sofía P. & Juanchi (with David Bolzoni)	19 (5,2,6,6)	"Yo soy aquél" (David Bolzoni)
October 2	Paola & Federico (with Daniel Agostini)	34 (9,6,9,10)	"Paisaje" (Gilda)
October 2	Patricio & Priscila (with Coki Ramírez)	27 (7,3,8,9)	"¿Cómo?" (Chico Novarro)

=== Round 10 ===
Secret vote: Oscar Mediavilla

Running order

Date	Couple	Score	Song (original artist)
October 30	Patricio & Priscila	27 (8,6,5,8)	"New York City" (Frank Sinatra)
October 30	Andrea & Jonathan	27 (8,4,7,8)	"Nada es para siempre" (Fabiana Cantilo)
October 23	Sofía Z. & Cristian	23 (7,3,6,7)	"With or Without You" (Boyce Avenue)
October 23	Alvaro & Ana Laura	32 (9,6,8,9)	"Libre" (Nino Bravo)
October 23	Belén & Augusto	13 (4,1,3,5)	"I Wanna Rock and Roll All Night" (Kiss)
October 23	Florencia & Javier	31 (9,6,7,9)	"Amor a la mexicana" (Thalía)
October 23	Paola & Federico	31 (9,7,8,8)	"María" (Ricky Martin)
