= Cantando por un Sueño (Argentine TV series) =

- Created by: El Trece
- Starring: Marcelo Tinelli (1-2); José M. Listorti (3-Present); Denise Dumas (3-Present)
- Country of origin: Argentina
- No. of seasons: 4

Original release
- Network: El Trece
- Release: 2006 – present

Cantando por un Sueño (literally "Singing for a dream") is a former segment inside the Argentine television program Showmatch, and now an independent TV show broadcast on El Trece.

On the contest, a non-celebrity "dreamer" (man or woman) who in addition must be a professional singer, is accompanied by a celebrity for some weeks of a singing competition. The couples are awarded points by a panel of judges, who give scores from 1 to 10, and those with the fewer points have to face the public vote to continue in the program.

As of May 2012, the show is in its fourth season and the panel of judges continues to include icons of the Argentine musical industry: Valeria Lynch, Óscar Mediavilla and Patricia Sosa. Journalist Marcelo Polino, who also serves as a judge in Bailando por un Sueño and Soñando por Bailar, is part of the panel of judges too.

== Airing of the show ==
Season	Stars	Weeks	Dates	Celebrity honor places		
Season	Stars	Weeks	Dates	Winner	Second place	Third place
1) August 2006	8	7	08/16/06-12/15/06	Iliana Calabró & Ricardo Rubio	Rodolfo Ranni & Lorena Miranda	Sandra Ballesteros & Andrés Olarte
1) August 2006	8	7	08/16/06-12/15/06	Iliana Calabró & Ricardo Rubio	Rodolfo Ranni & Lorena Miranda	Tota Santillán & Agustina Vita
2) November 2007	12	13	11/01/07-12/18/07	Tití Fernández & Micaela Salinas	Brenda Gandini & Francisco Cracogna	Karina Jelinek & Emiliano Rómbola
2) November 2007	12	13	11/01/07-12/18/07	Tití Fernández & Micaela Salinas	Brenda Gandini & Francisco Cracogna	Diego Ramos & Florencia Vázquez
3) October 2011	15	12	05/07/11-12/18/11	Patricio Giménez & Priscila Juárez	Álvaro Navia & Ana P. Rodríguez	Andrea López & Jonathan González
3) October 2011	15	12	05/07/11-12/18/11	Patricio Giménez & Priscila Juárez	Álvaro Navia & Ana P. Rodríguez	Belén Frances & Augusto Álvarez
4) May 2012	19	31	05/13/12-12/16/12	Mole Moli & Natalie Scalzadonna	Silvina Escudero & Sebastián Vitale	Chiqui Abecasis & Irina Abecasis
4) May 2012	19	31	05/13/12-12/16/12	Mole Moli & Natalie Scalzadonna	Silvina Escudero & Sebastián Vitale	Marcelo Iripino & Indira Aprile
5) July 2020	28	26	27/07/20-15/01/21	Agustín Sierra & Inbal Comedi	Ángela Leiva & Brian Lanzelotta	Rocío Quiroz & Rodrigo Tapari
5) July 2020	28	26	27/07/20-15/01/21	Agustín Sierra & Inbal Comedi	Ángela Leiva & Brian Lanzelotta	Gladys, La bomba Tucumana & Santiago Griffo

== Judges ==
Judges	Role	Seasons			
Judges	Role	1	2	3	4
Valeria Lynch	Head Judge	♦	♦	♦	♦
Óscar Mediavilla	Head Judge	♦	♦	♦	♦
Patricia Sosa	Head Judge	♦	♦	♦	♦
Patricia Sosa	Head Judge			♦	♦
Lucho Avilés	Head Judge		♦		
Laura Ubfal	Head Judge	♦			
Reina Reech	Temporary Judge			♦	
Paz Martínez	Temporary Judge			♦	

Full time judge
Temporary/Guest judge

== Seasons ==
=== Cantando 2006 ===
==== Contestants ====
Famous	Professional partner	Outcome	Days
(Argentina) Iliana Calabro; Actress	(Argentina) Ricardo Rubio	Winners of Cantando 2006	61 days

=== Couples ===
A total of 45 celebrities have appeared in the three seasons of Cantando por un Sueño. For each season, the celebrities are paired with a professional singer as a partner and a coach who instructs helps them with the song's choice and the work during the week. A total of 45 professional singers as the partners have appeared alongside celebrities.

==== List of the current professional partners ====
- Alejandro Gallo
- Antonella Cirillo
- Augusto Buccafusco
- Bruno Coccia
- Carla del Huerto
- Cristian Sergio
- Facundo Magrane
- Florencia Anca
- Francisco Eizaguirre
- Inbal Comedi
- Jessica Abouchain
- Juan Persico
- Lautaro Rodriguez
- Leandro Bassano
- Luciana Rosenthal
- Manuel Victoria
- Mariano Zito
- Melina de Piano
- Michel Hersch
- Nell Valenti
- Pablo Turturiello
