= Zaira Nara =

Argentine TV host and model (born 1988)

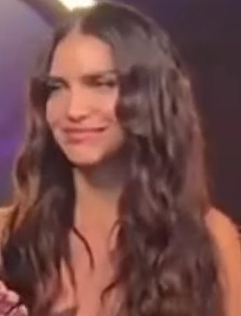
- Nara at the Fashion Martín Fierro Awards in 2026
- Born: Zaira Tatiana Nara; 15 August 1988 (age 38); Boulogne Sur Mer, Buenos Aires, Argentina
- Occupation: Model
- Years active: 2008–present
- Partners: Diego Forlán (2009–2011); Juan Mónaco (2011–2014); Jakob von Plessen (2015–2022); Facundo Pieres (2022)
- Children: 2
- Relatives: Wanda Nara (sister)
- Modeling information
- Height: 169 cm (5 ft 7 in)
- Hair color: Brown
- Eye color: Green
- Agency: Multitalent Agency
- Website: www.zairabeauty.com.ar

Zaira Nara (Latin American Spanish: [ˈsajɾa ˈnaɾa]; born 15 August 1988) is an Argentine model and actress of Lebanese descent.

== Early life and family ==
Zaira Nara was born in Boulogne Sur Mer, Argentina to Andrés Nara and Nora Colosimo. She is the younger sister of Wanda Nara. She is of Lebanese descent.

== Career ==
Nara began her career as a child model and professionally in adolescence for the agency Dotto Models, but later in 2008 she left that agency to join Chekka Buenos Aires, the agency of Mauricio Catarain in which she won numerous advertising contracts to be the image of prestigious brands of clothing, lingerie and cosmetics.

In 2010 she competed as contestant in the Marcelo Tinelli's show Bailando 2010, being eliminated ninth, and in the same year she became also the host of La Cocina del Show. In 2011 she became the winner of the Balón Rosa de Oro (the Pink Ballon d'Or), an Argentine female prize, and replaced her elder sister Wanda in Bailando 2011 when the latter left the show because of her third pregnancy.

In 2010, she was ranked 47th in a list of the world's sexiest women published by FHM magazine. In 2012, Cosmopolitan described her as South America's beauty icon. She has been the cover girl of the Argentine editions of Cosmopolitan and Women's Health.

She has modeled for brands such as Herbal Essences, McDonald's, Promesse, La Serenísima, Gillette, Pantene and Falabella. She has participated in is Fashion Week and BAFWEEK.

A social media influencer, she has over 4.5 million of followers on Instagram, over 2.5 million on Twitter and over 1.2 million on Facebook. She also has a personal blog and a personal online shop.

In 2023, she was announced as the new ambassador for Betsson, the largest online casino in Argentina. Her trip to the 2023 Cannes Film Festival was sponsored by Campari.

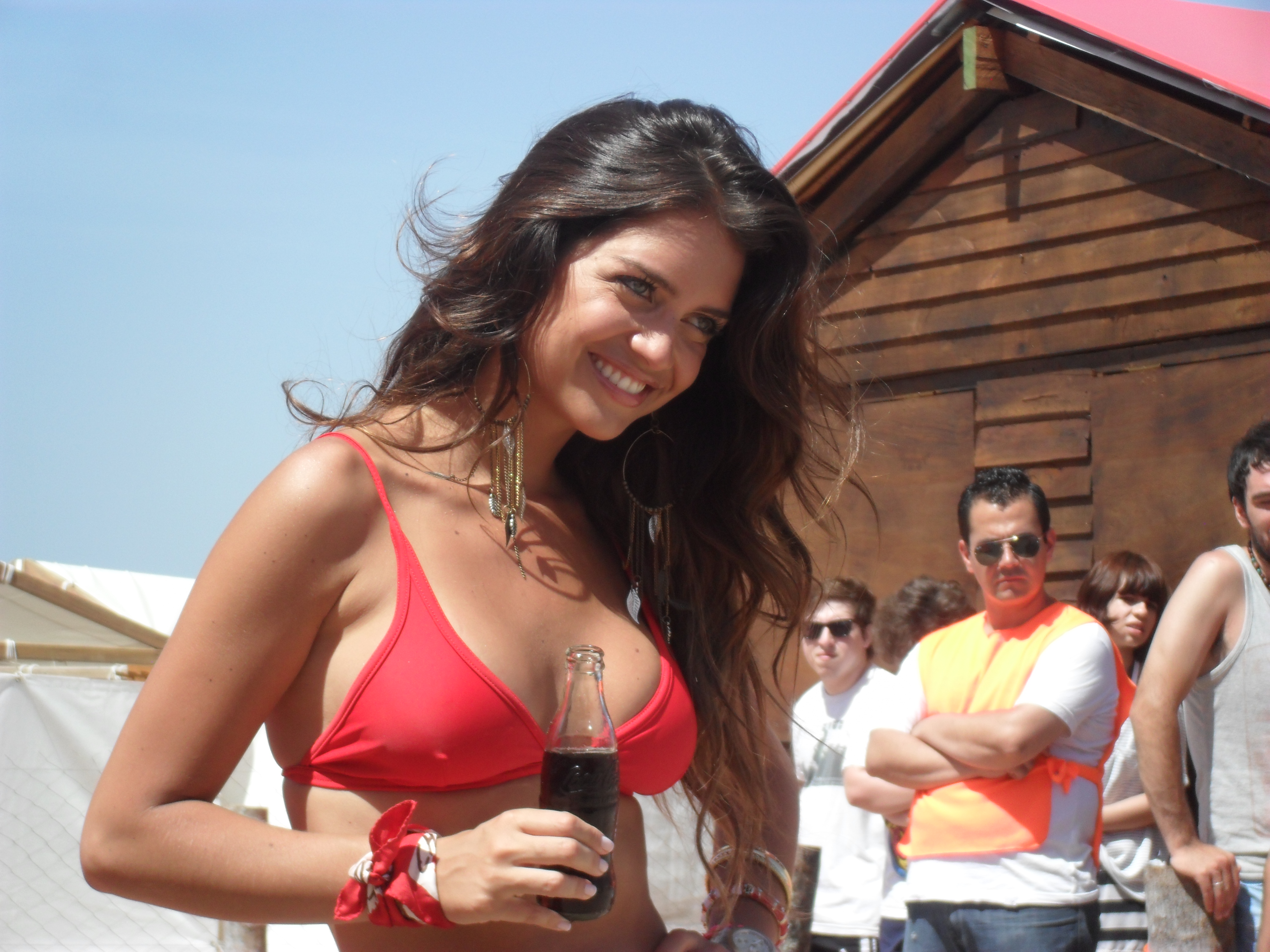
Nara in 2012

== Personal life ==
On 9 March 2011, after two years of relationship, Diego Forlán announced on his Twitter page that he and Zaira were engaged to be married: however, in June 2011, they announced they were breaking their engagement.

Zaira became engaged to horseback rider Jakob von Plessen in April 2015. They have a son and a daughter.

== Filmography ==
=== Television ===
- 2006 — Música total
- 2008 — El último vuelo del día
- 2009 — Animérica
- 2009/2010 — Justo a tiempo
- 2010 — Justo a tiempo España
- 2010 — Bailando 2010
- 2010 — La Cocina del Show
- 2011 — Bailando 2011
- 2012 — Tendencia
- 2013 — Todos Contentos y bastante locos
- 2014/2015 — Tu Mejor Sábado
- 2015 — Tu Mejor Domingo
- 2016/2017 — Morfi Cafe
- 2017/2019 — Morfi, todos a la mesa
- 2017 — La Fiesta de Morfi
- 2018/2019 — Cortá por Lozano
- 2019 — Martín Fierro, alfombra roja
- 2025 — Streaming

Reality shows
Year	Name	Role	Notes
2010	(Argentina) Bailando 2010	Contestant	9th eliminated
2011	(Argentina) Bailando 2011	Contestant	17th eliminated
2023	MasterChef Argentina	Guest	Season 3, episode 50
2023	(Uruguay) ¿Quién es la máscara? (Uruguayan season 3)	Mamushka	4th unmasked
2023	(Argentina) Bailando 2023	Judge replacing	

=== Theater ===
- 2004 — Anacondas para Todos con Xampe Lampe
- 2008 — Planeta Show
- 2008 — El Libro de la Selva
- 2013–2014 — Los locos Grimaldi
