= Bailando 2010 =

- Season 2010
- The cast of Bailando 2010
- Presented by: Marcelo Tinelli

Release
- Original network: Canal 13
- Original release: May 4 – December 20, 2010

Season chronology
- ← Previous; El Musical de tus Sueños Next → Bailando 2011

Bailando 2010 was the sixth season of Bailando por un Sueño. It premiered on May 4, 2010. This was the season with the most replacements, due to the withdrawals of two contestants (Luciana Salazar and Evangelina Anderson), and injuries to others. Season 6 was also the first in which the judges did not restore some of the losing couples to competition.

Among the judges, Carmen Barbieri quit the show and was replaced by Moria Casán. Ricardo Fort quit the show twice and was replaced by the journalist Marcelo Polino and Luis Ventura. Fort came back for the season finale, but the production decided to dismiss him from the show.

After two semi-finals, the season finale aired on December 20. Boxer Fabio "Mole" Moli and top model Paula Chaves danced against each other four times that night: Latin pop, Merengue, Reggaeton and Axé music. Fabio won with 50.24% of the public vote.

== Couples ==
Celebrity	Notability	Professional Partner	Status
Miguel "Negro" Piñera	Singer	Ana Laura López	Eliminated 1st by the 39.4%
Victoria Vanucci	model	Diego Gómez	Eliminated 2nd by the 38.8%
Lorenzo Lamas	actor	Milagros Michael	Eliminated 3rd by the 33.5%
Violeta Lo Re	Television Personality	Martín Gómez	Eliminated 4th by the 27.6%
Cecilia "Chechu" Bonelli	Model and journalist	Gustavo Pechetto	Eliminated 5th by the 28.7%
Florencia "Floppy" Tesouro	Television Personality	Matías Cejas	Eliminated 6th by the 26.8%
Paola Miranda	Vedette	Gastón Fernández	Eliminated 7th by the 20.7%
Jimena Monteverde	Professional Chef	Javier Romero	Eliminated 8th by the 32.4%
Zaira Nara	Model and Television Presenter	Lucas Heredia	Eliminated 9th by the 47.6%
Belén Francese	Actress and Author	Hernán Doval	Eliminated 10th by the 49.15%
Luciana Salazar	model	–	Withdrew
Sarah Paddy Jones	Dancer	Nicolás Espinosa	Eliminated 11th by the 27.2%
Evangelina Anderson	model	–	Withdrew
Sabrina Rojas	model	Martín Whitencamp	Eliminated 12th by the 40.7%
Mariana "Loly" Antoniale	Television Personality	Juan Pablo Battaglia	Eliminated 13th by the 22.8%
Lola Ponce	Singer and actress	Ariel Juin	Eliminated 14th by the 24.1%
Amalia Granata	Television Personality	Gabriel Usandivaras	Eliminated 15th by the 44.7%
Juana Repetto	actress	Cristian Ponce	Eliminated 16th by the 20.8%
Jésica Cirio	model	Rodrigo Escobar	Eliminated 17th by the 47.7%
Andrea Ghidone	Vedette	Emanuel González	Eliminated 18th by the 23.97%
Emilia Attias	actress	Pablo Juin	Eliminated 19th by the 31.55%
Sofía Pachano	Dancer	Nicolás Armengol	Eliminated 20th by the 34.71%
Matías Alé	actor	Laura Fernández	Eliminated 21st by the 32.97%
Belén Francese^{[b]}	Actress and Author	Facundo Mazzei	Eliminated 22nd by the 25.75%
Flavio Mendoza	Choreographer	Gisela Bernal	Eliminated 23rd by the 47.82%
Virginia Gallardo	Dancer and TV Personality	Carlos Bernal	Eliminated 24th by the 37.81%
Sofía Zámolo	model	Maximiliano D'Iorio	Eliminated 25th by the 46.33%
Vanina Escudero^{[a]}	Dancer and TV Personality	Pier Fritzsche	Semi-finalists by the 32.18%
Silvina Escudero	Dancer and TV Personality	Nicolás Scillama	Semi-finalists by the 31.97 / 28.06%
Paula Chaves	Top Model	Alejandro Gallego	Runners-up by the 49.76%
Fabio "La Mole" Moli	Boxer	Julia Cejas^{[c]}	Winners by the 50.24%

- ^[a] Luciana Salazar left the competition, and Vanina Escudero entered in her place.
- ^[b] Evangelina Anderson left the competition, and Belén Francese entered in her place.
- ^[c] Mariana Conci was the original partner, but she left the competition after Music from movies' round.

== Scoring chart ==
Couple	Place	01	02	03	04	05	06	07	08	09	10	11	12	13	14	15	16	17	18	19	20	21	22	23	24	25	SF		F
Couple	Place	01	02	03	04	05	06	07	08	09	10	11	12	13	14	15	16	17	18	19	20	21	22	23	24	25	1	2	F
Mole	1	31	44	29	42	34	37	46	*	30	40	36	32	43	*	35	39	39	42	39	35	44	35	39	38	SAFE	5		6
Paula	2	43	41	36	43	38	45	45	37	39	36	44	43	36	32	42	42	39	47	36	44	29^{[1]}	42	35	39	SAFE		4	2
Silvina	3/4	38	44	32	47	43	45	46	47	43	43	48	50	40	46	39	42	48	38	40	37	43	47	47	46	SAFE		3	
Vanina	3/4											43	41	38	46	45	45	43	45	39	40	36	42	43	46	SAFE	2		
Sofía Z.	5	45	45	47	47	39	46	35	44^{[2]}	42	36	48	41	50	45	47	39	36	45	36	37^{[3]}	45	35	46	39	ELIM			
Virginia	6	42	40	42	41	42	33	43	44	35	39	43	48	38	38	48	41	42	38	43	35	36	42	39	37				
Flavio	7	34	43	39	42	47	47	37	41	45	36	48	48	50	46	39	49	45	48	44	43	50	47	43					
Belén	8 & 20	28	41	43	41	36	41	41	34	42	34		36	40^{[4]}	42	35	39	32	42	36	30	43	38						
Matías	9	45	45	45	37	41	44	*	43	47	43	43	45	42	40	41	47	46	44	36	35	36							
Sofía P.	10	45	37	48	47	46	48	46	*	43	43	49	49	43	44	43	45	47	49	36	37								
Emilia	11	48	46	48	48	42	42	48	34	46	45	42	45	37	42	49	45	39	48	30^{[5]}									
Andrea	12	40	46	31	43	34	45	47	44	45	45	47	49	50	41	41	46	48	42										
Jésica	13	43	35	48	37	46	45	42	45	41	43	40	37	42	44	47	36	36											
Juana	14	38	41	42	43	43	39	42	44	41	44	36	36	46^{[1]}	41	48	36												
Amalia	15	35	42	36	34	39	41	36	40	35	36	42	44	41	35	35													
Lola	16	44	47	33	46	37	48	39	41	40	47	43	41	40	35														
Loly	17	33	41	43	45	39	33	38	37	38	45	39	41	36															
Sabrina	18	36	39	39	38	47^{[1]}	38	36	42	40^{[6]}	39^{[6]}	39^{[6]}	36																
Evangelina	N/A	45	47	41	46	48^{[7]}	47	47	47	46	34	49																	
Paddy	19	36	41	39	40	45^{[8]}	37	32	42	39	40^{[9]}	31^{[9]}																	
Luciana	N/A	37	40	44	41	39	45	38	40	35	30																		
Zaira	21	33	38	37	37	26	41	31	39	30																			
Jimena	22	36	30	35	29	36	37	34	30																				
Paola	23	41	32	43	39	34	41	27																					
Floppy	24	28	32	42	37	41	36																						
Chechu	25	34	37	39	41	34																							
Violeta	26	36	32	39	37																								
Lorenzo	27	35	37	29																									
Victoria	28	35	29																										
Negro	29	23																											

Red numbers indicate the lowest score for each week.
Green numbers indicate the highest score for each week.
indicates the couple eliminated that week.
indicates the couple was saved by the public.
indicates the couple was saved by the jury.
indicates the couple withdrew.
indicates the winning couple.
indicates the runner-up couple.
indicates the semi-finalists couples.

- In the third duel Lorenzo Lamas was replaced by José María Listorti.
- In the fourteenth duel Amalia Granata was replaced by Adabel Guerrero and Lola Ponce by Patricia "Coki" Ramirez.
- Fabio "Mole" Moli, Matías Alé and Sofía Pachano were sentenced because they stopped their routines in the middle of the choreography, as they forgot it. Matías in round 7, Sofía in round 8 and Fabio in rounds 8 and 14.
- In round 25, all the teams danced Country as they were in a sentence, so there were no scores. The safe couples, were the semi-finalists.
- ^[1] replaced by Mónica Farro.
- ^[2] replaced by Adabel Guerrero.
- ^[3] replaced by María Fernanda Callejón.
- ^[4] replaced by Erika Mitdank.
- ^[5] replaced by Andrea Estévez.
- ^[6] replaced by Patricia "Coki" Ramirez.
- ^[7] replaced by Carolina "Pampita" Ardohaín.
- ^[8] replaced by Vanina Escudero.
- ^[9] replaced by Rocío Marengo.

=== Highest and lowest scoring performances ===
The best and worst performances in each dance according to the judges' marks are as follows:

Dance	Best dancer(s)	Best score	Worst dancer(s)	Worst score
Reggaeton	Emilia Attias	48	Miguel "Negro" Piñera	23
Disco	Evangelina Anderson; Lola Ponce	47	Victoria Vanucci	29
Salsa	Sofía Pachano; Emilia Attias; Jesica Cirio	48	Lorenzo Lamas; Fabio "La Mole" Moli	29
Axé music	Emilia Attias	48	Jimena Monteverde	29
Argentine cumbia	Evangelina Anderson	48	Zaira Nara	26
Adagio	Sofía Pachano; Lola Ponce	48	Mariana "Niña Loly" Antoniale; Virginia Gallardo	33
Hip-hop	Emilia Attias	48	Paola Miranda	27
Cha-cha-cha	Silvina Escudero; Evangelina Anderson	47	Jimena Monteverde	30
Latin pop	Matías Alé	47	Zaira Nara; Fabio "La Mole" Moli	30
Cuarteto	Lola Ponce	47	Luciana Salazar	30
Latin adagio	Sofía Pachano; Evangelina Anderson	49	Sarah Paddy Jones	31
Arabic music	Silvina Escudero	50	Fabio "La Mole" Moli	32
Pole dance	Andrea Ghidone; Flavio Mendoza; Sofía Zámolo	50	Mariana "Niña Loly" Antoniale; Paula Chaves	36
Lambada	Flavio Mendoza; Silvina Escudero; Vanina Escudero	46	Paula Chaves	32
Music video	Emilia Attias	49	Amalia Granata; Fabio "La Mole" Moli; Belén Francese	35
Adagio from telenovelas	Matías Alé	47	Juana Repetto; Jesica Cirio	36
Merengue	Andrea Ghidone; Silvina Escudero	48	Belén Francese	32
Strip dance	Sofía Pachano	49	Virginia Gallardo; Silvina Escudero	38
Dancing in the rain	Flavio Mendoza	44	Emilia Attias	30
Aero dance	Paula Chaves	44	Belén Francese	30
Aquadance	Flavio Mendoza	50	Paula Chaves	29
Jive	Flavio Mendoza; Silvina Escudero	47	Sofía Zámolo	35
Music from Movies	Silvina Escudero	47	Paula Chaves	35
Rock and roll	Vanina Escudero; Silvina Escudero	46	Virginia Gallardo	37

== Styles, scores and songs ==
Secret vote is in bold text.

=== May ===
Reggaeton and Disco
Date	Couple	Style	Song	Score					Total
Date	Couple	Style	Song	Graciela	Ricardo	Anibal	Reina	Carmen	Total
May 6	Luciana & Pier	Reggaeton	Angel & Khriz featuring Gocho and John Eric – "Na de Na"	7	10	5	8	**7**	37
May 6	Mole & Mariana	Reggaeton	Tiburón Valdez – "Hasta Abajo Papi"	7	10	3	6	**5**	31
May 6	Paddy & Nicolás	Reggaeton	Daddy Yankee – "Ella Me Levantó"	8	10	4	7	**7**	36
May 6	Virginia & Carlos	Reggaeton	Blindaje 10 – "Amigos Especiales"	10	8	6	9	**9**	42
May 7	Silvina & Nicolás	Reggaeton	Daddy Yankee – "Pose"	8	7	6	8	**9**	38
May 7	Lorenzo & Milagros	Reggaeton	Daddy Yankee – "¿Qué Tengo Que Hacer?"	8	8	5	7	**7**	35
May 7	Sofía P. & Nicolás	Reggaeton	Zion & Lennox featuring Daddy Yankee – "Tu Príncipe"	9	10	7	9	**10**	45
May 7	Emilia & Pablo	Reggaeton	Don Omar – "Conteo"	10	10	8	10	**10**	48
May 7	Loly & Juan	Reggaeton	La Factoría – "Ahora Hay Otro En Mi Vida"	7	7	5	7	**7**	33
May 7	Belén & Hernán	Reggaeton	Chapa C – "Llorarás Por Mi"	6	6	4	6	**6**	28
May 10	Evangelina & Facundo	Reggaeton	Daddy Yankee – "Ella Me Levantó"	10	9	7	9	**10**	45
May 10	Sabrina & Martín	Reggaeton	Wisin & Yandel – "Abusadora"	8	9	7	5	**7**	36
May 10	Paola & Gastón	Reggaeton	Flex – "Te Quiero"	10	8	6	7	**10**	41
May 10	Andrea & Emanuel	Reggaeton	Angel & Khriz – "Ven Báilalo"	8	7	7	9	**9**	40
May 10	Jesica & Rodrigo	Reggaeton	El Original – "Brújula de Amor"	9	10	6	9	**9**	43
May 11	Victoria & Diego	Reggaeton	La Factoría featuring Eddy Lover – "Perdóname"	8	8	4	7	**8**	35
May 11	Jimena & Javier	Reggaeton	La Factoría – "Yo Soy Tu Gatita"	10	10	4	6	**6**	36
May 11	Violeta & Martín	Reggaeton	Héctor & Tito – "Baila Morena"	9	10	4	7	**6**	36
May 11	Paula & Alejandro	Reggaeton	Flex featuring Mr. Saik – "Dime Si Te Vas Con Él"	9	10	6	9	**9**	43
May 13	Negro & Ana Laura	Reggaeton	Vico C – "La Vecinita"	6	6	2	5	**4**	23
May 13	Lola & Ariel	Reggaeton	Daddy Yankee – "Llamado de Emergencia"	10	10	6	9	**9**	44
May 13	Amalia & Gabriel	Reggaeton	Latin Fresh – "Bata Bata"	8	7	4	7	**9**	35
May 13	Chechu & Gustavo	Reggaeton	Wisin & Yandel – "Ahora Es"	8	9	4	7	**6**	34
May 13	Juana & Cristian	Reggaeton	Wisin & Yandel – "Rakata"	9	9	5	8	**7**	38
May 14	Zaira & Lucas	Reggaeton	Don Omar – "Dile"	7	8	4	7	**7**	33
May 14	Flavio & Gisela	Reggaeton	Don Omar – "Virtual Diva"	8	8	4	7	**7**	34
May 14	Floppy & Matías	Reggaeton	Macano – "Déjame Entrar"	6	7	3	6	**6**	28
May 14	Matías & Laura	Reggaeton	Daddy Yankee – "Dale Caliente"	10	9	7	9	**10**	45
May 14	Sofía Z. & Maximiliano	Reggaeton	Ricky Martin featuring Daddy Yankee – "Drop It on Me"	9	10	7	9	**10**	45
May 20	Paddy & Nicolás	Disco	Kym Mazelle – "Young Hearts Run Free"	10	10	5	**8**	8	41
May 20	Luciana & Pier	Disco	Madonna – "Hung Up"	10	9	5	**8**	8	40
May 20	Silvina & Nicolás	Disco	Gloria Gaynor – "Never Can Say Goodbye"	9	10	6	**9**	10	44
May 20	Sofía P. & Nicolás	Disco	Gloria Gaynor – "I Love You Baby"	8	8	6	**8**	7	37
May 20	Virginia & Carlos	Disco	Village People – "Can't Stop the Music"	8	10	6	**8**	8	40
May 21	Emilia & Pablo	Disco	Pussycat Dolls – "Hush Hush"	9	10	7	**10**	10	46
May 21	Victoria & Diego	Disco	Bee Gees – "Tragedy"	7	7	3	**7**	5	29
May 21	Andrea & Emanuel	Disco	Patrick Hernandez – "Born to Be Alive"	10	10	6	**10**	10	46
May 21	Juana & Christian	Disco	Mika – "Love Today"	8	10	6	**8**	9	41
May 21	Loly & Juan Pablo	Disco	Earth, Wind & Fire – "September"	10	10	5	**8**	8	41
May 24	Lorenzo & Milagros	Disco	Bee Gees – "Stayin' Alive"	10	9	4	**7**	7	37
May 24	Evangelina & Facundo	Disco	Cyndi Lauper – "Disco Inferno"	10	10	7	**10**	10	47
May 24	Violeta & Martín	Disco	Thelma Houston – "Don't Leave Me This Way"	8	9	3	**6**	6	32
May 24	Jesica & Rodrigo	Disco	Donna Summer – "On the Radio"	8	8	4	**8**	7	35
May 24	Paola & Gastón	Disco	Gloria Gaynor – "I Am What I Am"	7	8	4	**7**	6	32
May 25	Jimena & Javier	Disco	Laura Branigan – "Gloria"	8	8	3	**6**	5	30
May 25	Mole & Mariana	Disco	Village People – "YMCA"	9	10	6	**9**	10	44
May 27	Amalia & Gabriel	Disco	Donna Summer – "Hot Stuff"	9	9	5	**9**	10	42
May 27	Matías & Laura	Disco	Bee Gees – "You Should Be Dancing"	10	10	6	**9**	10	45
May 27	Lola & Ariel	Disco	Cher – "Strong Enough"	10	10	7	**10**	10	47
May 27	Belén & Hernán	Disco	Sister Sledge – "We Are Family"	10	9	5	**8**	9	41
May 27	Sofía Z. & Maximiliano	Disco	Donna Summer – "Last Dance"	10	10	6	**9**	10	45
May 28	Zaira & Lucas	Disco	Barry White – "You're The First, The Last, My Everything"	10	9	5	**7**	7	38
May 28	Floppy & Matías	Disco	Sylvester – "You Make Me Feel (Mighty Real)"	7	7	3	**8**	7	32
May 28	Sabrina & Martín	Disco	Earth, Wind & Fire – "Boogie Wonderland"	9	9	5	**8**	8	39
May 28	Flavio & Gisela	Disco	Jamiroquai – "Canned Heat"	10	9	6	**9**	9	43
May 28	Paula & Alejandro	Disco	ABBA – "Voulez-Vous"	9	9	6	**8**	9	41
May 28	Chechu & Gustavo	Disco	Macy Gray – "Sexual Revolution"	8	8	4	**8**	9	37

=== June ===
Salsa and Axé music
Date	Couple	Style	Song	Score					Total
Date	Couple	Style	Song	Graciela	Ricardo	Anibal	Reina	Carmen	Total
June 3	Paddy & Nicolás	Salsa	Celia Cruz – "Yo Viviré"	9	7	**5**	8	10	39
June 3	Silvina & Nicolás	Salsa	Yuri Buenaventura – "Mala Vida"	7	6	**5**	7	7	32
June 3	Loly & Juan Pablo	Salsa	José Alberto "El Canario" – "Me Dejó Picao"	10	10	**5**	8	10	43
June 3	Sofía P. & Nicolás	Salsa	Gloria Estefan – "Mi Tierra"	10	10	**8**	10	10	48
June 4	Emilia & Pablo	Salsa	Puerto Rican Power – "Tu Cariñito"	10	10	**8**	10	10	48
June 4	Sabrina & Martín	Salsa	Gilberto Santa Rosa – "La Agarro Bajando"	9	9	**5**	8	8	39
June 4	Lola & Ariel	Salsa	Charlie Cruz – "Bombón de Azúcar"	8	7	**5**	7	6	33
June 4	Andrea & Emanuel	Salsa	Willy Chirino – "Mi Clientela"	7	7	**4**	7	6	31
June 4	Sofía Z. & Maximiliano	Salsa	Sexappeal – "La Llorona"	10	10	**7**	10	10	47
June 7	Evangelina & Facundo	Salsa	Dark Latin Groove – "Acuyuyé"	10	10	**5**	8	8	41
June 7	Lorenzo & Milagros	Salsa	Dark Latin Groove – "La Quiero A Morir"	8	7	**3**	6	5	29
June 7	Amalia & Gabriel	Salsa	Gloria Estefan and Celia Cruz – "Tres Gotas De Agua Bendita"	10	9	**4**	7	6	36
June 7	Jesica & Rodrigo	Salsa	Dark Latin Groove – "Volveré"	10	10	**8**	10	10	48
June 7	Paula & Alejandro	Salsa	Los Van Van – "Temba, Tumba, Timba"	9	9	**6**	7	7	38
June 8	Virginia & Carlos	Salsa	Frankie Negron – "No Me Compares"	10	10	**5**	8	9	42
June 8	Juana & Cristian	Salsa	Dark Latin Groove – "Juliana"	9	9	**6**	9	9	42
June 10	Zaira & Lucas	Salsa	Dark Latin Groove – "Atrévete (No Puedes Conmigo)"	10	9	**4**	7	7	37
June 10	Mole & Mariana	Salsa	Oscar D'León and José Alberto "El Canario" – "Llegó El Sabor"	7	7	**3**	6	6	29
June 10	Luciana & Pier	Salsa	Gilberto Santa Rosa – "Déjate Querer"	10	10	**6**	9	9	44
June 10	Jimena & Javier	Salsa	Celia Cruz – "Sazón"	10	9	**4**	6	6	35
June 10	Floppy & Matías	Salsa	Chichi Peralta – "Procura"	10	9	**5**	9	9	42
June 11	Violeta & Martín	Salsa	Yuri Buenaventura – "Rueda de Casino"	10	10	**4**	8	7	39
June 11	Flavio & Gisela	Salsa	Marc Anthony – "Valió la Pena"	7	6	**6**	10	10	39
June 11	Belén & Hernán	Salsa	Celia Cruz – "Que Le Den Candela"	10	10	**5**	8	10	43
June 11	Paola & Gastón	Salsa	Marc Anthony featuring La India – "Vivir lo Nuestro"	9	10	**5**	9	10	43
June 11	Matías & Laura	Salsa	Tito Nieves – "La Salsa Vive"	10	10	**6**	9	10	45
June 11	Chechu & Gustavo	Salsa	Mangú – "Por Amarte Así"	10	9	**4**	8	8	39
June 15	Emilia & Pablo	Axé music	Axé Blond – "Pancadão"	10	**10**	8	10	10	48
June 17	Evangelina & Facundo	Axé music	Margareth Menezes – "Dandalunda"	10	**10**	7	9	10	46
June 17	Matías & Laura	Axé music	É o Tchan! – "Flinstchan"	9	**8**	5	8	7	37
June 17	Amalia & Gabriel	Axé music	É o Tchan! – "Turma do Batente"	8	**9**	5	6	6	34
June 17	Sabrina & Martín	Axé music	É o Tchan! – "Na Boquinha da Garrafa"	8	**9**	5	7	9	38
June 18	Violeta & Martín	Axé music	Terra Samba – "Latinha da Cerveja"	9	**10**	4	7	7	37
June 18	Flavio & Gisela	Axé music	Terra Samba – "Guti Guti do Terra"	9	**9**	6	9	9	42
June 18	Belén & Hernán	Axé music	Harmonía do Samba – "Essa Mulher Costoza"	10	**10**	5	8	8	41
June 21	Virginia & Carlos	Axé music	É o Tchan! – "Disque Tchan (Alô Tchan)"	10	**10**	6	8	8	41
June 21	Sofía P. & Nicolás	Axé music	É o Tchan! – "Tchan No Havaí"	10	**10**	7	10	10	47
June 22	Jimena & Javier	Axé music	Café con Leche – "Picaflor"	8	**8**	3	5	5	29
June 22	Paddy & Nicolás	Axé music	Tchakabum – "Tesouro de Pirata"	10	**9**	4	10	7	40
June 22	Sofía Z. & Maximiliano	Axé music	Tchakabum – "Aninha Na Praia"	10	**10**	7	10	10	47
June 22	Paola & Gastón	Axé music	Terra Samba – "Treme Terra"	8	**9**	5	8	9	39
June 22	Paula & Alejandro	Axé music	Bom Balanço – "Tic Bom"	8	**10**	6	9	10	43
June 24	Luciana & Pier	Axé music	Terra Samba – "Na Manteiga"	10	**10**	5	8	8	41
June 24	Mole & Mariana	Axé music	É o Tchan! – "Segure o Tchan"	8	**9**	6	9	10	42
June 24	Loly & Juan Pablo	Axé music	Patrulha do Samba – "Swing de Rua"	10	**10**	6	9	10	45
June 24	Jesica & Rodrigo	Axé music	Tchakabum – "Dança da Mãoçinha"	9	**8**	5	8	7	37
June 24	Andrea & Emanuel	Axé music	Terra Samba – "Carrinho de Mão"	10	**10**	6	8	9	43
June 24	Chechu & Gustavo	Axé music	Gang do Samba – "Cada Macaco No Seu Galho"	10	**9**	5	8	9	41
June 25	Lola & Ariel	Axé music	Companhia do Pagode – "Dança do Canguru"	10	**10**	7	9	10	46
June 25	Silvina & Nicolás	Axé music	Asa de Águia – "Dança do Vampiro"	10	**10**	7	10	10	47
June 25	Zaira & Lucas	Axé music	É o Tchan! – "Bambolê"	9	**8**	5	8	7	37
June 25	Juana & Cristian	Axé music	É o Tchan! – "A Dança do Bumbum"	10	**9**	6	9	9	43
June 25	Floppy & Matías	Axé music	Carrapicho – "Tic, Tic Tac"	8	**7**	5	8	9	37

- On June 14, Luis Ventura replaced Ricardo Fort during the sentencing.
- On June 17, Moria Casán replaced Carmen Barbieri.

=== July ===
Argentine cumbia, Adagio and Hip-hop
Date	Couple	Style	Song	Score					Total
Date	Couple	Style	Song	Graciela	Ricardo	Anibal	Reina	Moria	Total
July 1	Emilia & Pablo	Argentine cumbia	Ráfaga – "Ráfaga de Amor"	**9**	9	6	9	9	42
July 1	Loly & Juan Pablo	Argentine cumbia	La Nueva Luna – "Iluminará"	**8**	9	5	8	9	39
July 1	Silvina & Nicolás	Argentine cumbia	Damas Gratis – "Se Te Ve la Tanga"	**9**	9	5	10	10	43
July 1	Chechu & Gustavo	Argentine cumbia	Volcán – "Esa Malvada"	**8**	8	4	7	7	34
July 2	Lola & Ariel	Argentine cumbia	Gilda – "Fuiste"	**9**	9	5	8	8	37
July 2	Zaira & Lucas	Argentine cumbia	Gilda – "Corazón Valiente"	**6**	6	3	5	6	26
July 2	Paola & Gastón	Argentine cumbia	Los Chakales – "Vete de Mi Lado"	**7**	8	4	7	8	34
July 5	Mole & Mariana	Argentine cumbia	Ráfaga – "Mentirosa"	**9**	9	4	6	6	34
July 5	Jimena & Javier	Argentine cumbia	Gladys La Bomba Tucumana – "La Pollera Amarilla"	**8**	8	5	8	7	36
July 6	Luciana & Pier	Argentine cumbia	Ráfaga – "Luna Luna"	**8**	10	5	8	8	39
July 6	Virginia & Carlos	Argentine cumbia	Gilda – "El Paisaje"	**9**	9	6	9	9	42
July 6	Mónica F. & Martín	Argentine cumbia	Los Charros – "Amores Como El Nuestro"	**10**	10	7	10	10	47
July 6	Floppy & Matías	Argentine cumbia	Red – "Pienso en Ti"	**8**	10	5	9	9	41
July 6	Juana & Cristian	Argentine cumbia	Sombras – "Pega La Vuelta"	**9**	10	6	9	9	43
July 8	Pampita & Facundo	Argentine cumbia	Antonio Ríos – "Nunca Me Faltes"	**10**	10	8	10	10	48
July 8	Matías & Laura	Argentine cumbia	Amar Azul – "Yo Me Enamoré"	**9**	9	6	9	8	41
July 8	Belén & Hernán	Argentine cumbia	Ráfaga – "Noche de Estrellas"	**8**	8	4	8	8	36
July 8	Sofía Z. & Maximiliano	Argentine cumbia	Ráfaga – "Ritmo Caliente"	**9**	9	5	8	8	39
July 8	Vanina & Nicolás	Argentine cumbia	La Cumbia – "Porque Te Amo"	**9**	10	6	10	10	45
July 9	Jesica & Rodrigo	Argentine cumbia	Gilda – "No Me Arrepiento de Este Amor"	**10**	9	7	10	10	46
July 9	Flavio & Gisela	Argentine cumbia	Ráfaga – "Agüita"	**10**	10	7	10	10	47
July 9	Amalia & Granata	Argentine cumbia	Los Palmeras – "El Bombón Asesino"	**9**	9	4	8	9	39
July 9	Sofía P. & Nicolás	Argentine cumbia	Los Palmeras – "Dame Un Beso"	**10**	10	7	10	9	46
July 9	Andrea & Emanuel	Argentine cumbia	Sombras – "La Ventanita"	**9**	7	4	7	7	34
July 9	Paula & Alejandro	Argentine cumbia	Lia Crucet – "Cumbia Apretadita"	**8**	9	5	8	8	38
July 13	Lola & Ariel	Adagio	Mariah Carey – "Without You"	10	10	8	10	**10**	48
July 13	Virginia & Carlos	Adagio	Lionel Richie – "Hello"	8	8	4	7	**6**	33
July 13	Juana & Cristian	Adagio	A-ha – "Crying in the Rain"	9	9	5	8	**8**	39
July 15	Silvina & Nicolás	Adagio	Robbie Williams – "Angels"	9	9	7	10	**10**	45
July 15	Zaira & Lucas	Adagio	Europe – "Carrie"	9	10	5	8	**9**	41
July 15	Amalia & Gabriel	Adagio	Celine Dion – "All by Myself"	9	10	5	8	**9**	41
July 15	Sofía Z. & Maximiliano	Adagio	Celine Dion – "The Power of Love"	10	10	7	9	**10**	46
July 16	Evangelina & Facundo	Adagio	Aerosmith – "I Don't Want to Miss a Thing"	10	10	7	10	**10**	47
July 19	Floppy & Martín	Adagio	Duran Duran – "Ordinary World"	8	10	4	7	**7**	36
July 19	Mole & Mariana	Adagio	The Righteous Brothers – "Unchained Melody"	7	7	5	8	**10**	37
July 20	Jimena & Javier	Adagio	Billy Joel – "Honesty"	8	7	5	8	**9**	37
July 20	Luciana & Pier	Adagio	Bonnie Tyler – "Total Eclipse of the Heart"	10	10	6	9	**10**	45
July 20	Belén & Hernán	Adagio	Prince – "Purple Rain"	9	9	5	9	**9**	41
July 20	Sabrina & Martín	Adagio	Jim Diamond – "I Should Have Known Better"	8	9	5	8	**8**	38
July 22	Emilia & Pablo	Adagio	Guns N' Roses – "November Rain"	10	10	6	8	**8**	42
July 22	Jesica & Rodrigo	Adagio	Wham! – "Careless Whisper"	10	10	7	9	**9**	45
July 22	Flavio & Gisela	Adagio	Toni Braxton – "Unbreak My Heart"	10	10	7	10	**10**	47
July 22	Loly & Juan Pablo	Adagio	Melissa Manchester – "Looking Through The Eyes Of Love"	8	7	4	7	**7**	33
July 22	Paddy & Nicolás	Adagio	Roxette – "It Must Have Been Love"	9	9	4	7	**8**	37
July 23	Paola & Gastón	Adagio	Gary Moore – "Still Got the Blues"	10	10	5	8	**8**	41
July 23	Andrea & Emanuel	Adagio	Jessica Simpson – "Take My Breath Away"	10	10	5	10	**10**	45
July 23	Sofía P. & Nicolás	Adagio	Chris De Burgh – "Lady in Red"	10	10	8	10	**10**	48
July 23	Paula & Alejandro	Adagio	Whitney Houston – "I Will Always Love You"	10	10	6	9	**10**	45
July 23	Matías & Laura	Adagio	Scorpions – "Still Loving You"	7	10	7	10	**10**	44
July 27	Sofía Z. & Maximiliano	Hip-hop	The Pussycat Dolls – "When I Grow Up"	8	7	4	**8**	8	35
July 27	Matías & Laura	Hip-hop	Justin Timberlake – "SexyBack"	—	—	—	—	—	—
July 27	Amalia & Gabriel	Hip-hop	Destiny's Child – "Bootylicious"	9	9	4	**7**	7	36
July 27	Jesica & Rodrigo	Hip-hop	Christina Aguilera – "Dirrty"	10	9	5	**9**	9	42
July 29	Silvina & Nicolás	Hip-hop	Britney Spears – "Do Somethin'"	10	9	7	**10**	10	46
July 29	Virginia & Carlos	Hip-hop	Usher featuring Lil' Jon and Ludacris – "Yeah!"	9	9	6	**9**	10	43
July 29	Paola & Gastón	Hip-hop	Britney Spears – "...Baby One More Time"	7	5	3	**6**	6	27
July 29	Sofía P. & Nicolás	Hip-hop	Christina Aguilera – "Ain't No Other Man"	10	10	7	**9**	10	46
July 30	Paddy & Nicolás	Hip-hop	Jennifer Lopez – "Get Right"	9	7	3	**7**	6	32
July 30	Belén & Hernán	Hip-hop	Jennifer Lopez – "Do It Well"	8	10	6	**8**	9	41

=== August ===
Hip-hop, Cha-cha-cha, Latin pop and Cuarteto
Date	Couple	Style	Song	Score					Total
Date	Couple	Style	Song	Graciela	Ricardo	Anibal	Reina	Carmen	Total
August 2	Emilia & Pablo	Hip-hop	The Black Eyed Peas – "Boom Boom Pow"	10	10	8	**10**	10	48
August 2	Mole & Mariana	Hip-hop	N'Sync – "Pop"	10	10	6	**10**	10	46
August 3	Evangelina & Facundo	Hip-hop	Britney Spears – "Womanizer"	10	10	7	**10**	10	47
August 3	Jimena & Javier	Hip-hop	Destiny's Child – "Lose My Breath"	10	7	4	**7**	6	34
August 3	Juana & Cristian	Hip-hop	Britney Spears – "Overprotected"	10	9	6	**9**	8	42
August 3	Sabrina & Martín	Hip-hop	Beyoncé featuring Jay-Z – "Crazy in Love"	8	9	4	**9**	7	36
August 3	Paula & Alejandro	Hip-hop	Britney Spears – "Crazy"	10	10	6	**10**	10	46
August 3	Andrea & Emanuel	Hip-hop	Backstreet Boys – "Get Another Boyfriend"	10	10	7	**10**	10	47
August 5	Lola & Ariel	Hip-hop	The Black Eyed Peas – "Pump It"	8	9	6	**8**	8	39
August 5	Luciana & Pier	Hip-hop	Britney Spears – "Gimme More"	8	10	5	**8**	7	38
August 5	Flavio & Majo	Hip-hop	The Black Eyed Peas – "Let's Get Started"	9	10	4	**7**	7	37
August 5	Zaira & Lucas	Hip-hop	Britney Spears – "Oops!... I Did It Again"	8	9	3	**6**	5	31
August 5	Loly & Juan Pablo	Hip-hop	Madonna featuring Justin Timberlake – "4 minutes"	7	10	5	**8**	8	38
August 9	Virginia & Carlos	Cha-cha-cha	Luis Miguel – "La Última Noche"	10	10	**6**	9	9	38
August 10	Silvina & Nicolás	Cha-cha-cha	Ricky Martin – "Amor"	10	10	**7**	10	10	47
August 10	Mole & Mariana	Cha-cha-cha	La Mosca – "Cha Cha Cha"	—	—	—	—	—	—
August 10	Adabel & Maximiliano	Cha-cha-cha	Marcela Morelo featuring Bahiano – "Para Toda La Vida"	10	10	**5**	10	9	44
August 12	Emilia & Pablo	Cha-cha-cha	Santana featuring Maná – "Corazón espinado"	8	8	**4**	7	7	34
August 12	Lola & Ariel	Cha-cha-cha	Celia Cruz – "Ríe y Llora"	10	10	**5**	8	8	41
August 12	Belén & Hernán	Cha-cha-cha	Miguel Sáez – "Mala Mujer"	8	7	**4**	7	8	34
August 12	Matías & Laura	Cha-cha-cha	Rubén Rada – "Aparte de Ti y Tu Boca"	10	10	**5**	9	9	43
August 12	Jimena & Javier	Cha-cha-cha	Caetano Veloso – "Capullito de Alelí"	8	6	**2**	7	7	30
August 12	Jesica & Rodrigo	Cha-cha-cha	Son by Four – "Sofía"	10	10	**6**	9	10	45
August 12	Amalia & Gabriel	Cha-cha-cha	Jennifer Lopez – "Let's Get Loud"	9	10	**5**	8	8	40
August 13	Evangelina & Facundo	Cha-cha-cha	Pussycat Dolls – "Sway"	10	10	**7**	10	10	47
August 13	Paddy & Nicolas	Cha-cha-cha	Miriam Makeba – "Pata Pata"	10	9	**4**	9	10	42
August 13	Flavio & Gisela	Cha-cha-cha	Jennifer Lopez – "Cariño"	9	10	**5**	8	9	41
August 13	Luciana & Pier	Cha-cha-cha	Christina Aguilera – "Falsas esperanzas"	9	10	**5**	8	8	40
August 13	Zaira & Lucas	Cha-cha-cha	Mimí Maura – "Yo No Lloro Mas"	10	9	**4**	8	8	39
August 16	Andrea & Emanuel	Cha-cha-cha	Rey Ruiz – "Ay Mujer!"	10	10	**6**	9	9	44
August 16	Paula & Alejandro	Cha-cha-cha	Michael Stuart – "Déjala Que Baile"	8	9	**4**	8	8	37
August 16	Loly & Juan Pablo	Cha-cha-cha	Ednita Nazario – "Tres Deseos"	7	9	**5**	7	9	37
August 16	Juana & Cristian	Cha-cha-cha	Jennifer Lopez and Chayanne – "Dame (Touch Me)"	9	9	**6**	10	10	44
August 16	Sabrina & Martín	Cha-cha-cha	Son by Four – "Muévelo"	9	10	**5**	9	9	42
August 16	Sofía P. & Nicolás	Cha-cha-cha	Thalía – "Echa Pa' Lante"	—	—	—	—	—	—
August 19	Paddy & Nicolás	Latin pop	Ricky Martin – "María"	9	**9**	5	8	8	39
August 19	Lola & Ariel	Latin pop	Chayanne – "Enamorado"	8	**8**	6	8	10	40
August 19	Matías & Laura	Latin pop	Chayanne – "Torero"	10	**10**	7	10	10	47
August 19	Silvina & Nicolás	Latin pop	Chayanne – "Caprichosa"	10	**10**	6	9	8	43
August 19	Mole & Mariana	Latin pop	Chayanne – "Salomé"	7	**6**	4	8	5	30
August 20	Evangelina & Facundo	Latin pop	Ricky Martin – "She Bangs"	10	**10**	6	10	10	46
August 20	Juana & Cristian	Latin pop	Ricky Martin – "Pégate"	9	**9**	6	9	8	41
August 20	Flavio & Majo	Latin pop	David Bisbal – "Lloraré las Penas"	10	**10**	6	9	10	45
August 20	Luciana & Pier	Latin pop	Ricky Martin – "Livin' la Vida Loca"	8	**9**	4	7	7	35
August 20	Zaira & Lucas	Latin pop	Chayanne – "Baila Baila"	7	**8**	3	6	6	30
August 23	Amalia & Gabriel	Latin pop	Thalía – "¿A quién le importa?"	8	**9**	4	7	7	35
August 23	Jesica & Rodrigo	Latin pop	David Bisbal – "Oye El Boom"	9	**8**	6	9	9	41
August 23	Andrea & Emanuel	Latin pop	Chayanne – "Provócame"	10	**10**	6	9	10	45
August 23	Paula & Alejandro	Latin pop	Ricky Martin – "Shake Your Bon-Bon"	10	**10**	4	8	7	39
August 23	Loly & Juan Pablo	Latin pop	Chayanne – "Ay Mamá"	9	**9**	4	8	8	38
August 23	Sofía P. & Nicolás	Latin pop	David Bisbal – "Ave María"	9	**10**	7	9	8	43
August 24	Emilia & Pablo	Latin pop	Shakira – "Loba"	9	**10**	7	10	10	46
August 24	Belén & Hernán	Latin pop	Chayanne – "Mira Ven, Ven"	9	**9**	5	10	9	42
August 24	Virginia & Carlos	Latin pop	Thalía – "Arrasando"	7	**10**	4	7	7	35
August 24	Sofía Z. & Maximiliano	Latin pop	David Bisbal – "Bulería"	10	**10**	5	8	9	41
August 24	Coki & Martín	Latin pop	Chayanne – "Boom Boom"	8	**10**	5	8	9	40
August 26	Evangelina & Facundo	Cuarteto	La Mona Jiménez – "Boom Boom"	**8**	8	4	7	7	34
August 26	Emilia & Pablo	Cuarteto	Banda XXI – "El Mismo Calor"	**10**	9	7	9	10	45
August 26	Mole & Mariana	Cuarteto	Rodrigo – "Soy Cordobés"	**10**	10	4	8	8	40
August 26	Sofía P. & Nicolás	Cuarteto	La Barra – "Gotas de Pena"	**8**	10	7	9	9	43
August 26	Amalia & Gabriel	Cuarteto	Rodrigo – "Como Olvidarla"	**9**	8	4	9	6	36
August 27	Silvina & Nicolás	Cuarteto	Rodrigo – "Que Ironía"	**10**	10	6	9	8	43
August 27	Sofía Z. & Maximiliano	Cuarteto	Jeam Carlos – "Quiereme"	**8**	9	4	8	7	36
August 27	Lola & Ariel	Cuarteto	Rodrigo – "Como Olvidarla"	**10**	10	7	10	10	47
August 27	Flavio & Gisela	Cuarteto	Rodrigo – "Lo Mejor del Amor"	**8**	9	4	8	7	36
August 27	Jesica & Rodrigo	Cuarteto	Rodrigo – "Por Lo Que Yo Te Quiero"	**10**	9	6	9	9	43
August 30	Paula & Alejandro	Cuarteto	Banda XXI – "Pero Me Acuerdo de Ti"	**9**	9	4	7	7	36
August 30	Juana & Cristian	Cuarteto	Banda XXI – "Mami Llegó Tu Papi"	**9**	9	6	10	10	44
August 30	Andrea & Emanuel	Cuarteto	Rodrigo – "Amor Clasificado"	**10**	10	5	10	10	45
August 30	Rocío & Nicolás	Cuarteto	Rodrigo – "Fuego y Pasión"	**10**	10	4	8	8	40
August 30	Matías & Laura	Cuarteto	Rodrigo – "La Mano de Dios"	**10**	10	5	8	10	43
August 31	Virginia & Carlos	Cuarteto	Rodrigo – "Ocho Cuarenta"	**8**	10	5	8	8	39
August 31	Belén & Hernán	Cuarteto	Rodrigo – "Amor de Alquiler"	**7**	7	4	8	8	34
August 31	Luciana & Pier	Cuarteto	La Mona Jiménez – "Beso A Beso"	**7**	7	4	6	6	30
August 31	Loly & Juan Pablo	Cuarteto	El Símbolo – "De Reversa Mami"	**10**	10	6	9	10	45
August 31	Coki & Martín	Cuarteto	Cachureos – "El Agite"	**8**	10	5	8	8	39

=== September ===
Latin adagio, Arabic music and Pole dance
Date	Couple	Style	Song	Score					Total
Date	Couple	Style	Song	Graciela	Ricardo	Anibal	Reina	Carmen	Total
September 3	Lola & Ariel	Latin adagio	Lola Ponce – "Inalcanzable"	10	9	6	9	**9**	43
September 3	Rocío & Nicolás	Latin adagio	Ricardo Montaner – "Castillo Azul"	10	7	3	6	**5**	31
September 3	Mole & Mariana	Latin adagio	Sergio Dalma – "Bailar pegados"	10	8	4	7	**7**	36
September 6	Emilia & Pablo	Latin adagio	Marc Anthony – "Ahora Quien"	8	10	6	9	**9**	42
September 6	Silvina & Nicolás	Latin adagio	Luis Miguel – "Tengo Todo Excepto a Tí"	10	10	8	10	**10**	48
September 6	Flavio & Gisela	Latin adagio	Ricky Martin – "Fuego de Noche, Nieve de Día"	10	10	8	10	**10**	48
September 6	Juana & Cristian	Latin adagio	Ricky Martin – "A Medio Vivir"	8	8	6	8	**6**	36
September 6	Jesica & Rodrigo	Latin adagio	Luis Miguel – "La Incondicional"	9	9	5	9	**8**	40
September 6	Loly & Juan Pablo	Latin adagio	Chayanne – "Un Siglo Sin Ti"	8	10	4	8	**9**	39
September 7	Matías & Laura	Latin adagio	Chayanne – "Dejaría Todo"	8	10	6	9	**10**	43
September 7	Paula & Alejandro	Latin adagio	Ricky Martin – "Vuelve"	9	10	6	9	**10**	44
September 7	Sofía Z. & Maximiliano	Latin adagio	Ricky Martin – "Déjame Llorar"	10	10	8	10	**10**	48
September 7	Andrea & Emanuel	Latin adagio	Luis Miguel – "Ayer"	10	10	7	10	**10**	47
September 7	Sofía P. & Nicolás	Latin adagio	Alejandro Sanz – "Y Si Fuera Ella"	9	10	10	10	**10**	49
September 9	Virginia & Carlos	Latin adagio	Ricky Martin – "Tal Vez"	10	10	6	9	**8**	43
September 9	Amalia & Gabriel	Latin adagio	David Bisbal – "Dígale"	10	9	6	9	**8**	42
September 9	Evangelina & Facundo	Latin adagio	Ricardo Montaner – "Volver"	10	10	9	10	**10**	49
September 9	Vanina & Pier	Latin adagio	Luis Miguel – "Entrégate"	10	10	6	9	**8**	43
September 9	Coki & Martín	Latin adagio	Ricardo Montaner – "Será"	9	9	4	7	**10**	39
September 14	Belén & Facundo	Arabic music	Amr Diab – "Habibi Ya Nour El Ain"	8	9	4	**7**	8	36
September 14	Juana & Cristian	Arabic music	Ofra Haza – "Im Nin'Alu"	8	7	4	**8**	9	36
September 14	Mole & Mariana	Arabic music	Tarkan – "Ölürüm Sana"	9	8	3	**6**	6	32
September 14	Matías & Laura	Arabic music	Hani Al Omari – "Molfet Lel Nazar"	10	10	6	**9**	10	45
September 16	Silvina & Nicolás	Arabic music	Mohamed Fouad – "Yalla Hawa"	10	10	10	**10**	10	50
September 16	Lola & Ariel	Arabic music	Marcus Viana – "Maktub II"	10	9	6	**8**	8	41
September 16	Flavio & Gisela	Arabic music	Hakim – "Ehdarun"	10	10	8	**10**	10	48
September 16	Virginia & Carlos	Arabic music	Ali Mohammed – "Raks Bedeya"	10	10	8	**10**	10	48
September 17	Jesica & Rodrigo	Arabic music	Tarkan – "Şımarık"	10	7	5	**7**	8	37
September 17	Sofía Z. & Maximiliano	Arabic music	Hakim – "El Wala Wala"	10	8	6	**8**	9	41
September 17	Sofía P. & Nicolás	Arabic music	Armen Kusikian and Samir Abut – "Al Rih"	10	10	9	**10**	10	49
September 17	Loly & Juan Pablo	Arabic music	Hakim – "Ah Ya Alby"	9	10	5	**8**	9	41
September 17	Andrea & Emanuel	Arabic music	Saber El Robaey – "Sidi Mansour"	10	10	9	**10**	10	49
September 20	Emilia & Pablo	Arabic music	Amir Sofi – "Isis"	10	8	8	**9**	10	45
September 20	Sabrina & Martín	Arabic music		8	8	4	**8**	8	36
September 20	Paula & Alejandro	Arabic music	Samir Shukry – "Habibi Ya Eini"	9	10	6	**9**	9	43
September 20	Amalia & Gabriel	Arabic music	Ehab Tawfik – "Allah Aleik Ya Sidi"	9	10	5	**10**	10	44
September 20	Vanina & Pier	Arabic music		10	9	5	**9**	8	41
September 23	Virginia & Carlos	Pole dance	INXS – "Suicide Blonde"	10	9	**5**	7	7	38
September 23	Silvina & Nicolás	Pole dance	Lenny Kravitz – "Always on the Run"	10	8	**6**	8	8	40
September 23	Mole & Mariana	Pole dance	AC/DC – "Back in Black"	10	10	**5**	8	10	43
September 23	Amalia & Gabriel	Pole dance	Bon Jovi – "You Give Love a Bad Name"	9	8	**5**	9	10	41
September 24	Lola & Ariel	Pole dance	Poison – "Unskinny Bop"	10	9	**6**	8	7	40
September 24	Andrea & Emanuel	Pole dance	Guns N' Roses – "Welcome to the Jungle"	10	10	**10**	10	10	50
September 24	Flavio & Gisela	Pole dance	Alannah Myles – "Black Velvet"	10	10	**10**	10	10	50
September 24	Sofía P. & Nicolás	Pole dance	INXS – "New Sensation"	10	8	**7**	9	9	43
September 24	Matías & Laura	Pole dance	Five – "Everybody Get Up"	10	7	**6**	9	10	42
September 27	Paula & Alejandro	Pole dance	Aerosmith – "Eat the Rich"	8	8	**5**	7	8	36
September 27	Jesica & Rodrigo	Pole dance	Aerosmith – "Love in an Elevator"	8	8	**6**	10	10	42
September 27	Loly & Juan Pablo	Pole dance	Arrows – "I Love Rock 'n' Roll"	9	7	**5**	8	7	36
September 27	Vanina & Pier	Pole dance	AC/DC – "Highway to Hell"	8	8	**6**	8	8	38
September 28	Emilia & Pablo	Pole dance	Kris Allen – "Come Together"	8	10	**5**	7	7	37
September 28	Erika & Facundo	Pole dance	Christina Aguilera – "Fighter"	8	10	**5**	9	8	40
September 28	Mónica & Cristian	Pole dance	Britney Spears – "Satisfaction"	9	10	**7**	10	10	46
September 28	Sofía Z. & Maximiliano	Pole dance	Billy Idol – "Mony Mony"	10	10	**10**	10	10	50

=== October ===
Lambada, Music video, Adagio from telenovelas, Merengue and Strip dance
Date	Couple	Style	Song	Score					Total
Date	Couple	Style	Song	Graciela	Ricardo	Anibal	Reina	Moria	Total
October 1	Silvina & Nicolas	Lambada	Kaoma – "Lambamor"	10	**10**	7	10	9	46
October 1	Virginia & Carlos	Lambada	Francky Vincent – "Fruit de la Passion"	10	**7**	5	8	8	38
October 1	Amalia & Gabriel	Lambada	Kaoma – "Espanha"	9	**8**	4	7	7	35
October 1	Matías & Laura	Lambada	Natusha – "Baila Mi Rumba"	9	**10**	5	8	8	40
October 4	Andrea & Emanuel	Lambada	Beto Barbosa – "Dance e Balance com BB"	9	**10**	5	8	9	41
October 4	Belén & Facundo	Lambada	Arrow – "Groove Master"	9	**10**	5	8	10	42
October 4	Flavio & Gisela	Lambada	Kaoma – "Dançando Lambada"	10	**10**	6	10	10	46
October 4	Vanina & Pier	Lambada	Kaoma – "Dança Tago Mago"	10	**10**	6	10	10	46
October 5	Lola & Ariel	Lambada	Quatro – "Passa Sabe"	9	**7**	5	7	7	35
October 5	Sofía Z. & Maximiliano	Lambada	Beto Barbosa – "Mar de Emoções (Bambolê)"	10	**10**	7	9	9	45
October 5	Paula & Alejandro	Lambada	Charles D. Lewis – "Soca Dance"	8	**7**	4	6	7	32
October 5	Juana & Cristian	Lambada	Beto Barbosa – "Louca Magia"	10	**9**	5	9	8	41
October 7	Emilia & Franco	Lambada	Beto Barbosa – "Adocica"	9	**10**	5	9	9	42
October 7	Sofía P. & Nicolás	Lambada	Irmãos Verdades – "Ès a Minha Doçura"	9	**10**	6	9	10	44
October 7	Jesica & Rodrigo	Lambada	Ivete Sangalo – "A Galera"	9	**10**	6	9	10	44
October 7	Mole & Luciana	Lambada	Kaoma – "Chorando Se Foi"	—	—	—	—	—	—
October 11	Silvina & Nicolas	Music video	Britney Spears – "Gimme More"	**8**	10	5	9	7	38
October 11	Belén & Facundo	Music video	Kylie Minogue – "Can't Get You Out of My Head"	**7**	9	4	9	7	35
October 11	Sofía Z. & Maximiliano	Music video	Geri Halliwell – "It's Raining Men"	**9**	10	8	10	10	47
October 11	Flavio & Gisela	Music video	Lady Gaga – "Bad Romance"	**8**	9	5	10	7	39
October 11	Andrea & Emanuel	Music video	Rihanna – "Please Don't Stop The Music"	**8**	10	6	8	9	41
October 12	Juana & Cristian	Music video	Britney Spears – "Womanizer"	**10**	10	8	10	10	48
October 12	Virginia & Carlos	Music video	Madonna – "Express Yourself"	**10**	10	8	10	10	48
October 12	Vanina & Pier	Music video	Britney Spears – "Toxic"	**9**	10	7	9	10	45
October 12	Emilia & Pablo	Music video	Britney Spears featuring Madonna – "Me Against the Music"	**9**	10	10	10	10	49
October 12	Jesica & Rodrigo	Music video	Shakira – "Te Aviso, Te Anuncio (Tango)"	**10**	10	7	10	10	47
October 14	Paula & Alejandro	Music video	Madonna – "Sorry"	**8**	10	8	8	8	42
October 14	Mole & Mariana	Music video	Thalía – "Amor a la Mexicana"	**10**	8	4	5	8	35
October 14	Sofía P. & Lucas	Music video	Madonna – "Material Girl"	**9**	10	6	9	9	43
October 14	Matías & Laura	Music video	High School Musical – "We're All in This Together"	**8**	9	6	9	9	41
October 14	Amalia & Gabriel	Music video	Madonna – "Vogue"	**8**	6	4	9	8	35
October 18	Emilia & Franco	Adagio from telenovelas	Valeria Lynch – "Mentira" (from Dos Para Una Mentira)	9	**10**	7	10	9	45
October 18	Belén & Facundo	Adagio from telenovelas	Valeria Lynch – "Esa Extraña Dama" (from La Extraña Dama)	7	**10**	6	8	8	39
October 18	Flavio & Gisela	Adagio from telenovelas	Valeria Lynch – "Amamé en Cámara Lenta" (from Ese Hombre Prohibido)	9	**10**	10	10	10	49
October 18	Mónica & Alejandro	Adagio from telenovelas	Manuel Wirtz – "Por Ganar tu Amor" (from Chica Cósmica)	9	**9**	6	9	9	42
October 18	Matías & Laura	Adagio from telenovelas	Manuel Wirtz – "Donde Quieras Que Estés" (from El Día Que Me Quieras)	10	**10**	7	10	10	47
October 19	Sofía P. & Nicolás	Adagio from telenovelas	Carica – "Abrázame" (from Nano)	10	**10**	8	9	8	45
October 19	Sofía Z. & Maximiliano	Adagio from telenovelas	José Luis Rodríguez – "De Punta a Punta" (from Volver a Empezar)	8	**9**	6	8	8	39
October 19	Juana & Cristian	Adagio from telenovelas	Manuel Wirtz – "Hoy Te Necesito" (from El Último Verano)	7	**8**	5	7	9	36
October 19	Silvina & Nicolás	Adagio from telenovelas	Ricardo Montaner – "El Poder de tu Amor" (from Calypso)	9	**9**	7	9	8	42
October 19	Mole & Mariana	Adagio from telenovelas	Paz Martínez – "Una Lagrima Sobre el Teléfono" (from Una Voz en el Teléfono)	10	**8**	6	10	5	39
October 21	Virginia & Carlos	Adagio from telenovelas	Paz Martínez – "Y Qué?" (from Padre Coraje)	10	**10**	5	9	8	41
October 21	Andrea & Emanuel	Adagio from telenovelas	Alejandro Lerner – "Juntos Para Siempre" (from La Banda del Golden Rocket)	10	**10**	7	9	10	46
October 21	Vanina & Pier	Adagio from telenovelas	Alejandro Lerner – "Después de Ti"	9	**10**	6	10	10	45
October 14	Jesica & Rodrigo	Adagio from telenovelas	Valeria Lynch – "Me Das Cada Día Mas" (from Plumas y Lentejuelas)	8	**7**	5	8	8	36
October 22	Virginia & Carlos	Merengue	Elvis Crespo – "Suavemente"	9	8	7	10	**8**	42
October 22	Emilia & Franco	Merengue	Juan Luis Guerra 440 – "A Pedir Su Mano"	10	7	6	7	**9**	39
October 22	Flavio & Gisela	Merengue	Elvis Crespo – "Tu Sonrisa"	10	10	6	8	**10**	45
October 22	Belén & Facundo	Merengue	Rakim & Ken-Y – "Te Regalo Amores"	8	8	3	7	**6**	32
October 22	Matías & Laura	Merengue	Sergio Vargas – "La Ventanita"	10	10	7	9	**10**	46
October 22	Sofía P. & Nicolás	Merengue	Olga Tañón – "Es Mentiroso"	10	10	8	9	**10**	47
October 25	Vanina & Pier	Merengue	La Banda Sólida – "Por Amarte Así"	9	10	6	10	**8**	43
October 25	Mole & Mariana	Merengue	Wilfrido Vargas – "El Baile del Perrito"	9	9	5	8	**8**	39
October 25	Andrea & Emanuel	Merengue	Carlos Manuel – "Esa Chica Tiene Swing"	10	10	8	10	**10**	48
October 26	Silvina & Nicolás	Merengue	Juan Luis Guerra 440 – "La Bilirrubina"	10	10	8	10	**10**	48
October 26	Paula & Alejandro	Merengue	Chino & Nacho – "Mi Niña Bonita"	8	9	6	8	**8**	39
October 26	Sofía Z. & Maximiliano	Merengue	Manny Manuel – "Corazón Partio"	9	7	5	8	**7**	36
October 26	Jesica & Rodrigo	Merengue	Manny Manuel – "Vivir Así es Morir de Amor"	7	8	5	8	**8**	36
October 29	Virginia & Carlos	Strip dance	Peggy Lee – "Why Don't You Do Right?"	10	8	5	**7**	8	38
October 29	Matías & Laura	Strip dance	Aerosmith – "Rag Doll"	10	10	7	**9**	8	44
October 29	Flavio & Gisela	Strip dance	Beyoncé – "Naughty Girl"	10	10	8	**10**	10	48
October 29	Vanina & Pier	Strip dance	Prince – "Cream"	10	10	6	**10**	9	45
October 29	Andrea & Emanuel	Strip dance	AC/DC – "You Shook Me All Night Long"	10	10	4	**8**	10	42
October 30	Silvina & Nicolás	Strip dance	Aerosmith – "Crazy"	8	10	5	**8**	7	38
October 30	Mole & Mariana	Strip dance	Aerosmith – "Cryin'"	10	8	6	**8**	10	42

=== November ===
Strip dance, Dancing in the rain, Aero dance, Aquadance and Jive
Date	Couple	Style	Song	Score					Total
Date	Couple	Style	Song	Graciela	Marcelo	Anibal	Reina	Moria	Total
November 1	Belén & Facundo	Strip dance	B.B. King and Joe Cocker – "Dangerous Mood"	10	9	5	**8**	10	42
November 1	Paula & Alejandro	Strip dance	Joe Cocker – "You Can Leave Your Hat On"	10	10	7	**10**	10	47
November 1	Sofía Z. & Maximiliano	Strip dance	Guns N' Roses – "Since I Don't Have You"	10	8	7	**10**	10	45
November 1	Emilia & Franco	Strip dance	Beyoncé – "Fever"	10	10	8	**10**	10	48
November 1	Sofía P. & Nicolás	Strip dance	Alicia Keys – "Fallin'"	10	10	10	**9**	10	49
November 4	Virginia & Carlos	Dancing in the rain	David Bisbal – "Oye El Boom"	**10**	8	6	9	10	43
November 4	Mole & Mariana	Dancing in the rain	Madonna – "Hung Up"	**8**	7	6	8	10	39
November 4	Sofía P. & Nicolás	Dancing in the rain	Pussycat Dolls – "Hush Hush"	**9**	5	6	8	8	36
November 5	Silvina & Nicolás	Dancing in the rain	George Michael – "Careless Whisper"	**8**	5	7	10	10	40
November 5	Flavio & Gisela	Dancing in the rain	The Black Eyed Peas – "Pump It"	**9**	9	7	9	9	45
November 5	Matías & Laura	Dancing in the rain	The Black Eyed Peas – "Let's Get Started"	**9**	6	6	8	7	36
November 5	Vanina & Pier	Dancing in the rain	Chayanne – "Caprichosa"	**5**	7	7	10	10	39
November 8	Paula & Alejandro	Dancing in the rain	Donna Summer – "Last Dance"	**9**	5	8	8	8	36
November 8	Belén & Facundo	Dancing in the rain	Madonna – "Sorry"	**8**	6	6	8	8	36
November 8	Sofía Z. & Maximiliano	Dancing in the rain	The Trammps – "Disco Inferno"	**10**	5	6	8	7	36
November 8	Andrea & Franco	Dancing in the rain	Lady Gaga – "Bad Romance"	**8**	5	4	7	6	30
November 11	Silvina & Nicolás	Aero dance	David Guetta featuring Akon – "Sexy Bitch"	7	4	**8**	9	9	37
November 11	Mole & Mariana	Aero dance	Luis Miguel – "Ahora Te Puedes Marchar (Remix)"	8	5	**6**	7	8	35
November 11	Sofía P. & Nicolás	Aero dance	David Guetta featuring Kelly Rowland – "When Love Takes Over"	8	6	**8**	7	8	37
November 12	Virginia & Carlos	Aero dance	Erasure – "A Little Respect (Wayne G. Gurdy Club Mix)"	8	4	**7**	8	8	35
November 12	Flavio & Gisela	Aero dance	Madonna – "Give It to Me (Paul Oakenfold Remix)"	10	7	**7**	10	9	43
November 15	Paula & Alejandro	Aero dance	September – "Cry for You"	10	7	**7**	10	10	44
November 15	Matías & Laura	Aero dance	Electric Light Orchestra – "Last Train to London"	9	4	**5**	8	9	35
November 15	Vanina & Pier	Aero dance	Madonna – "La Isla Bonita (SMS Dancefloor Remix)"	10	5	**6**	10	9	40
November 16	Belén & Facundo	Aero dance	Tom Jones – "Sex Bomb (Remix)"	8	4	**4**	7	7	30
November 16	M. Fernanda & Maximiliano	Aero dance	A-Teens – "Gimme Gimme Gimme (Remix)"	9	5	**5**	9	9	37
November 19	Silvina & Nicolás	Aquadance	U2 – "With or Without You"	10	**7**	7	9	10	43
November 19	Matías & Laura	Aquadance	Michael Bolton – "How Am I Supposed to Live Without You"	10	**6**	8	7	7	36
November 22	Virginia & Carlos	Aquadance	Coldplay – "Clocks"	10	**4**	6	8	8	36
November 22	Belén & Facundo	Aquadance	Duran Duran – "Ordinary World"	10	**6**	7	10	10	43
November 23	Mónica & Alejandro	Aquadance	Queen – "The Show Must Go On"	8	**4**	5	6	5	29
November 23	Mole & Mariana	Aquadance	Aerosmith – "Amazing"	10	**7**	7	10	10	44
November 25	Sofía Z. & Maximiliano	Aquadance	James Blunt – "You're Beautiful"	10	**6**	8	10	10	44
November 25	Flavio & Gisela	Aquadance	Evanescence – "My Immortal"	10	**10**	10	10	10	50
November 25	Vanina & Pier	Aquadance	Sting – "Desert Rose"	10	**4**	6	8	8	36
November 29	Virginia & Carlos	Jive	Pat Boone – "Tutti Frutti"	**8**	10	6	9	9	42
November 29	Mole & Mariana	Jive	Lou Bega – "Mambo No. 5"	**10**	7	4	7	10	38
November 30	Silvina & Nicolás	Jive	Christina Aguilera – "Candyman"	**9**	10	8	10	10	47
November 30	Paula & Alejandro	Jive	Wham! – "Wake Me Up Before You Go-Go"	**9**	8	6	9	10	42
November 30	Belén & Facundo	Jive	Carlene Carter – "I Love You 'Cause I Want To"	**7**	10	5	8	8	38
November 30	Sofía Z. & Maximiliano	Jive	Madonna – "Hanky Panky"	**8**	9	4	7	7	35

- On November 29, Marcelo Polino replaced Anibal Pachano during the sentencing.
- From November 2 to 26 Ricardo Fort was replaced by journalist Marcelo Polino, who scored the remaining couples in the competition.

=== December ===
Jive, Music from movies, Rock and roll and Country
Date	Couple	Style	Song	Score					Total
Date	Couple	Style	Song	Graciela	Ricardo	Anibal	Reina	Moria	Total
December 2	Vanina & Pier	Jive	Ray Charles – "Hit the Road Jack"	**10**	10	5	8	9	42
December 2	Flavio & Gisela	Jive	Brian Setzer Orchestra – "Sexy Sexy"	**10**	8	10	10	9	47
December 6	Virginia & Carlos	Music from movies	Naturi Naughton and Collins Pennie – "Fame" (from Fame)	9	9	5	8	**8**	39
December 6	Paula & Franco	Music from movies	Bill Medley and Jennifer Warnes – "(I've Had) The Time of My Life" (from Dirty Dancing)	8	8	5	7	**7**	35
December 6	Vanina & Pier	Music from movies	Olivia Newton-John and John Travolta – "You're the One That I Want" (from Grease)	10	10	6	9	**8**	43
December 6	Mole & Julia	Music from movies	Celine Dion – "My Heart Will Go On" (from Titanic)	8	10	5	7	**9**	39
December 7	Silvina & Nicolás	Music from movies	Jerry Lee Lewis – "Great Balls of Fire" (from Great Balls of Fire!)	10	10	8	10	**9**	47
December 7	Flavio & Gisela	Music from movies	Christina Aguilera, Lil' Kim, Mýa and Pink – "Lady Marmalade" (from Moulin Rouge!)	10	10	6	8	**9**	43
December 7	Sofía Z. & Maximiliano	Music from movies	Whitney Houston – "I Will Always Love You" (from The Bodyguard)	10	10	7	9	**10**	46
December 10	Virginia & Carlos	Rock and roll	Elvis Presley – "Jailhouse Rock"	8	8	5	**8**	8	37
December 10	Paula & Franco	Rock and roll	Elvis Presley – "Blue Suede Shoes"	10	9	6	**6**	8	39
December 10	Silvina & Nicolás	Rock and roll	Bill Haley & the Comets – "Rock Around the Clock"	10	10	7	**10**	9	46
December 10	Sofía Z. & Maximiliano	Rock and roll	Little Richard – "Long Tall Sally"	9	9	5	**7**	9	39
December 10	Vanina & Pier	Rock and roll	Elvis Presley – "All Shook Up"	9	10	7	**10**	10	46
December 13	Mole & Julia	Rock and roll	Elvis Presley – "Hound Dog"	8	8	4	**8**	10	38

==== Duel ====
Duel
Date	Couple	Style	Song
December 14	Silvina & Nicolás	Country music	Dire Straits – "Walk of Life"
December 14	Vanina & Pier	Country music	John Fogerty – "Blue Moon Night"
December 14	Mole & Julia	Country music	Creedence Clearwater Revival – "Bad Moon Rising"
December 14	Sofía Z. & Maximiliano	Country music	Kenny Rogers and Dottie West – "All I Ever Need Is You"
December 14	Paula & Franco	Country music	Kenny Rogers – "The Gambler"

- From November 30 to December 3 Anibal Pachano was replaced by journalist Marcelo Polino, who scored the remaining couples in the competition.

==== Semi-final and Final ====
Semi-final and Final
Date	Couple	Style	Song	Points					
Date	Couple	Style	Song	Graciela	Ricardo	Anibal	Reina	Moria	Result
1st Semi-final (December 16)	Vanina & Pier	Cuarteto	La Mona Jiménez – "Beso A Beso"	—	1	1	—	—	—
1st Semi-final (December 16)	Mole & Julia	Cuarteto	Rodrigo – "Soy Cordobés"	1	—	—	1	1	**1**
1st Semi-final (December 16)	Vanina & Pier	Adagio from telenovelas	Alejandro Lerner – "Despues de Ti"	—	1	1	1	1	**1**
1st Semi-final (December 16)	Mole & Julia	Adagio from telenovelas	Paz Martinez – "Una Lagrima Sobre el Teléfono" (from Una Voz en el Teléfono)	1	—	—	—	—	—
1st Semi-final (December 16)	Vanina & Pier	Disco	Madonna – "Hung Up"	—	1	—	1	1	**1**
1st Semi-final (December 16)	Mole & Julia	Disco	Village People – "YMCA"	1	—	1	—	—	—
2nd Semi-final (December 17)	Paula & Franco	Argentine cumbia	Lía Crucet – "Cumbia Apretadita"	—	—	1	—	1	—
2nd Semi-final (December 17)	Silvina & Nicolás	Argentine cumbia	Damas Gratis – "Se Te Ve la Tanga"	1	1	—	1	—	**1**
2nd Semi-final (December 17)	Paula & Franco	Latin adagio	Ricky Martin – "Vuelve"	1	—	—	—	—	—
2nd Semi-final (December 17)	Silvina & Nicolás	Latin adagio	Luis Miguel – "Tengo Todo Exepto a Ti"	—	1	1	1	1	**1**
2nd Semi-final (December 17)	Paula & Franco	Cha-cha-cha	Michael Stuart – "Déjala Que Baile"	—	—	—	1	—	—
2nd Semi-final (December 17)	Silvina & Nicolás	Cha-cha-cha	Ricky Martin – "Amor"	1	1	1	—	1	**1**
Final (December 20)	Mole & Julia	Latin pop	Chayanne – "Salomé"	1	—	1	—	1	**1**
Final (December 20)	Paula & Franco	Latin pop	Ricky Martin – "Shake Your Bon-Bon"	—	1	—	1	—	—
Final (December 20)	Mole & Julia	Reggaeton	Tiburón Valdez – "Hasta Abajo Papi"	—	1	—	—	—	—
Final (December 20)	Paula & Franco	Reggaeton	Flex featuring Mr. Saik – "Dime Si Te Vas Con Él"	1	—	1	1	1	**1**
Final (December 20)	Mole & Julia	Merengue	Wilfrido Vargas – "El Baile del Perrito"	1	1	—	1	—	**1**
Final (December 20)	Paula & Franco	Merengue	Chino & Nacho – "Mi Niña Bonita"	—	—	1	—	1	—
Final (December 20)	Mole & Julia	Axé music	É o Tchan! – "Segure o Tchan"	1	—	—	1	—	—
Final (December 20)	Paula & Franco	Axé music	Bom Balanço – "Tic Bom"	—	1	1	—	1	**1**
