= Aníbal Pachano =

Argentine choreographer, actor, dancer, director and architect

Aníbal Ernesto Pachano
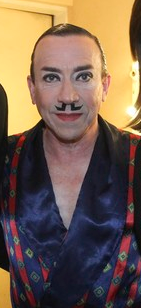
- Pachano in 2014
- Born: March 7, 1955 (age 71); Tostado, Santa Fe, Argentina
- Other name: "La Reina"
- Occupations: Actor; architect; dancer; choreographer; director
- Height: 1.66 m (5 ft 5 1/2 in)
- Spouse: Ana Sans (1983–1989)
- Children: Sofía Pachano

Aníbal Pachano (born March 7, 1955) is an Argentine choreographer, actor, dancer, director and architect. Together with his ex-wife Ana Sans, he created the art group "Bottom Tap."

== Biography ==
In 1966, his father, a dentist and politician-turned-blind, tried to break into the culinary field, but without success. His family went bankrupt, and had to travel to Buenos Aires, where Anibal started working as an errand boy. This didn't last, however, since moved to a different city every year. When he was 17, he was about to win a dance contest in the program,"Alta Tensión" (High Voltage) but was eliminated causing him a great frustration. Then, he studied architecture. During his time as a student he worked with Antonio Jantus (between 1974 and 1976). Later on he was a foreman in the Kliczkowski-Minond-Natanson-Nevani-Sztulwark studio, where he worked with Eduardo Rojkind, until he received his degree in architecture from the University of Buenos Aires in 1980. After this, he worked as a Professor of Visual Communication Systems III at the UBA, arriving in 1982 to design a house in the resort of Cariló. At 28, he fell in love with Ana Sans, a dancer he met when he went to see a musical. He began studying jazz dance at the same studio that she attended and two weeks later went to live together. Ana Sans and Aníbal created art group "Botton tap". Later on they had a daughter, Sofia. In May 2010 he revealed that he had been living with HIV since 2000.

== Career ==
While his career began in 1982, was in 2009 in Showmatch, the program hosted by Marcelo Tinelli, where he gained more popularity. He can be easily recognized by the way he dresses, due to the fact he frequently uses very colorful ties and top hats. In 2009 he created the play Pour La Gallery. He regularly appears as a guest panelist on Bendita TV driving a cycle with Beto Casella. In 2010, he again participated at the panel of judges of Showmatch Bailando 2010 and toured with his play Pour La Gallery. On November 27, 2010, Aníbal Pachano finished the country wide tour of his play Pour The Gallery in Córdoba. He began his 2011 tour of the play in Mar del Plata Additionally on 2011 he took part on the parade of "Mar del Plata Fashion Show."

In 2014 he was of the dancers in Soñando por Bailar, in El trece held by Marcelo Tinelli.

== Bottom Tap ==
With dancer Ana Sans, Aníbal created the artistic group "Botton tap." The story of Bottom Tap began with a show that premiered in Mar del Plata. Poppy was the first show they presented. Then came Tonight, Too much, Bottom Tap 1, Tap Botton 2 and 10 years of Botton. The artistic godmother of the "Bottom Tap" is Mirtha Legrand.

== Theatre ==
Year	Play
1982	Amapola
1983	Tonight
1984	Too much
1986	Botton tap 1
1987	Botton tap 2
1992	Los 10 años de los Botton tap
2000	Tangou
2008	Dominó
2009	Varieté para María Elena
2010	Pour la Gallery
2011	Pour la Gallery
2012	Smail
2013	Cirugía para 2
2014	Divain
2015	Family
2016	El espíritu infiel
2017	Flowers

== TV ==
Year	Program	Canal	Character / role
2009	Showmatch, El musical de tus Sueños	Canal Trece	Judge
2010	Showmatch, Bailando 2010	Canal Trece	Judge
2011	Showmatch, Bailando 2011	Canal Trece	Judge

== Premios Estrella de Mar ==
Year	Spectacle	Category	Result
2011	Pour La Gallery	Music Hall	Win
