= Paula Chaves =

Argentine model, actress and presenter (born 1984)

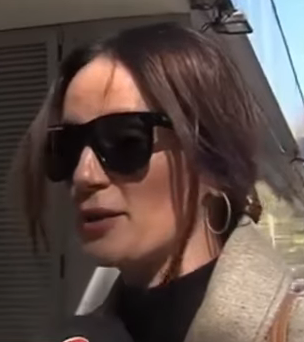
- Chaves in 2026
- Born: Paula Chaves Schulz; September 6, 1984 (age 42); Lobos, Argentina
- Occupations: Model, Actress and Television Host
- Years active: 2003-present
- Spouse: Pedro Alfonso (m. 2014)
- Children: Olivia Alfonso (b. 2013); Baltazar Alfonso (b. 2016); Filipa Alfonso (b. 2020)
- Parent(s): Miguel Ángel Chaves and Alejandra Schulz
- Relatives: Delfina Chaves (Sister); Gonzalo Chaves (Brother)
- Modeling information
- Height: 1.79 m (5 ft 10 1/2 in)
- Eye color: Green

Paula Chaves Schulz (born September 6, 1984, in Lobos, Argentina), is an Argentine model, actress and TV host.

== Career ==
Paula Chaves started participating in the reality show of models Super M 2003 where she won the opportunity to start her modelling career, first as a member of the team of Ricardo Piñeiro Modelos and later as part of the team of Multitalent. In 2005 she debuts as co-television host in Princesitas issued on the screen of Canal 13. In 2009 she made a special participation in the children's television series Niní. Paula Chaves participated in the dance reality show Bailando 2010 hosted by Marcelo Tinelli. In 2011 she conducted with Darío Lopilato the program Extra pequeño issued on the screen of Canal 13. That same year she made a special participation in Los únicos. She debuted on stage in the summer of 2011-2012 starring in the work Despedida de soltero. Paula Chaves also stars in the video clip "Frío" from Ricky Martin. In 2014 she returned as a television host with José María Listorti at the head of the cycle Este es el show issued on the screen of Canal 13. In 2015 she made a special participation in Socios por accidente 2. In 2017 she ends the cycle conduction of Este es el show and says goodbye to the screen of Canal 13 and from the producer Ideas del Sur. In 2018 she makes the big pass to the screen of Telefe in front of the reality show of pastry Bake Off Argentina produced by Turner Broadcasting System Latin America. After finishing the culinary program, she makes small participations in the channel as a guest television host in Por el Mundo, the travel success program hosted by Marley and replace Verónica Lozano in her program Cortá por Lozano. She was the television host of Todo por mi hija, el adelanto and Todo por mi hija, así comenzó issued on the screen of Telefe. In summer 2018-2019 she returns to the stage, starring Locos por Luisa with her husband Pedro Alfonso.

== Personal life ==
In 2010 Paula Chaves met Pedro Alfonso in Bailando 2010 living his fledgling romance as if it were a reality show since he was a producer of Ideas del Sur and she participated in the program Bailando 2010 her flirting and first approaches were given in front of the cameras of that program and two other cycles of the same producer Este es el show and La cocina del Show. In March 2011 after several fights they decided to end their relationship, although this would be only a 3-month in-pass, and on June 23, 2011, they resumed their relationship, but this time hidden from the media, it was on July 9, 2011, when they made public their reunion sealing their love in a musical in the program Sabado Show. In January 2013 Paula Chaves got engaged to Pedro Alfonso and on February 15, 2013, they announced that they were expecting their first baby. On August 23, 2013, she gave birth to the couple's first child, a girl called Olivia Alfonso. On September 8, 2014, she got married in a civil ceremony with Pedro Alfonso. October 4, 2014, she got married in a religious ceremony to Pedro Alfonso. In September 2015, she announced that they were expecting their second baby, but a month later, the media announced that she had lost the pregnancy naturally. On March 28, 2016, she announced that she was pregnant again. On October 2, 2016, she gave birth to the couple's second child, a boy called Baltazar Alfonso. In December 2019, she announced that they were expecting their third baby. On July 4, 2020, she gave birth to the couple's third child, a girl called Filipa Alfonso.

== Filmography ==
=== Television programs ===
Year	Program	Channel	Notes
2004	Videomatch	Telefe	Special participation in sketch
2005	Princesitas	Canal 13	Co-Host
2010	Extra Pequeño	Canal 13	Host
2014-2017	Este es el show	Canal 13	Host
2018	Por el mundo	Telefe	Guest Host
2018	Cortá por Lozano	Telefe	Host in replacement of Verónica Lozano
2018	Todo por mi hija, el adelanto	Telefe	Host
2018	Todo por mi hija, así comenzó	Telefe	Host
2019	Susana Giménez	Telefe	Guest Judge
2021	Cortá por Lozano	Telefe	Host in replacement of Verónica Lozano

Realities shows

Year	Title	Role	Result	Notes
2003	Super M	Contestant	Winner	
2010	Bailando 2010	Contestant	Runner-up	
2011	Bailando 2011	Contestant replacing Pamela Anderson	Salved by jury	Round 4: Axé
2011	Bailando 2011	Contestant	Semifinalist	
2012	Bailando 2012	Contestant with Pedro Alfonso	Semifinalist	
2014	Bailando 2014	Contestant ~~with Pedro Alfonso~~	Withdrew	
2015	Bailando 2015	Contestant guest by with Lizy Tagliani	Safe	Round 9: Trio Salsa
2017	Bailando 2017	Judge replacing Pampita		Round 4: Trio Salsa
2018–2021	Bake Off Argentina, El Gran Pastelero	Host		70 episodes
2021	MasterChef Celebrity Argentina	Special guest		1 episode
2023	Pasaplatos Famosos	Host		11 episodes
2023	Bailando 2023	Judge replacing Pampita		Round 2, 3 and 6
2024	¿Quién es la máscara? (Uruguayan TV series)	Contestant with Pedro Alfonso	6th unmaskeds	3 episodes

=== Television ===
Year	Title	Character	Channel
2009	Niní	Violeta Barranco	Telefe
2011	Los únicos	Roxi	Canal 13
2012	Concubinos	Paula	Canal 13
2015	Esperanza mía	Paula Gatica	Canal 13

=== Movies ===
Year	Movie	Character	Director
2015	Socios por accidente 2	Disfraz de Matias	Nicanor Loreti and Fabián Forte

=== Videoclips ===
Year	Artist	Song	Director
2011	Ricky Martin	Frío	Carlos Pérez
