= Fabio Moli =

Argentine boxer (born 1969)

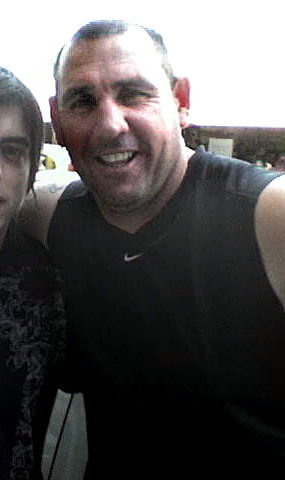
- Moli in 2008

Personal information
- Nickname: Mole Moli
- Born: Fabio Eduardo Moli; 23 May 1969 (age 57) Villa del Rosario, Córdoba, Argentina
- Height: 194 cm (6 ft 4 in)
- Weight: Heavyweight

Boxing career
- Stance: Orthodox

Boxing record
- Total fights: 55
- Wins: 44
- Win by KO: 29
- Losses: 9
- No contests: 2

Fabio Eduardo "La Mole" Moli (born 23 May 1969) is an Argentine former boxer and heavyweight champion of Argentina.

== Career ==
Throughout his career he has won nine titles so far. On 30 August 2003, was challenging for the title of World Boxing Association champion against Ukrainian Wladimir Klitschko, but lost by knockout in the first assault. On 14 November 2010, again won the Argentine championship in the Orfeo Superdomo in Córdoba against Lisandro "El Carnicero" Diaz by TKO in the fifth round.

Outside the boxing world, on 16 December 2010, with nearly 70% of the vote reached the final of Bailando 2010 (Argentinian version of Dancing with the Stars), a tournament that he won with 50.24% of the vote, against Argentine model Paula Chaves. He made his theatrical debut in December 2010 with the play El Gran Show at the theater Coral of Villa Carlos Paz. On 2011 he participated in the seventh season of Bailando por un Sueño, but this time, he was eliminated in the 24th place by last years runner-up Paula Chaves.

== Professional titles ==
- South American Heavyweight
- FAB
- World Boxing Association Fedelatin
- World Boxing Organization Latino
- World Boxing Council Hispanic world

== Professional boxing record ==
44 Wins (29 knockouts, 15 decisions), 9 Losses (6 knockouts, 2 decisions), 2 No Contests
Result	Record	Opponent	Type	Round	Date	Location	Notes
Loss	44-9-2	(Argentina) Matías Vidondo	DQ	5	30/08/2013	(Argentina) Club Atlético Talleres, Remedios de Escalada, Buenos Aires	Argentina Heavyweight Title. Moli disqualified for hitting Vidondo while his opponent was down.
Win	44-8-2	(Argentina) Emilio Ezequiel Zarate	KO	8	08/06/2012	(Argentina) Polideportivo Delmi, Salta	Argentina Heavyweight Title. Zarate knocked out at 1:39 of the eighth round.
Win	43-8-2	(Argentina) Sebastian Ignacio Ceballos	UD	10	16/12/2011	(Argentina) Club Defensores de Villa Lujan, San Miguel de Tucuman	Argentina Heavyweight Title.
Win	42-8-2	(Argentina) Lisandro Ezequiel Diaz	TKO	5	14/11/2010	Orfeo Superdomo, Cordoba, Argentina	Argentina Heavyweight Title.
Win	41-8-2	(Argentina) Emilio Ezequiel Zarate	KO	3	14/05/2010	(Argentina) Club Atletico Penarol, Pilar, Buenos Aires Province	
Win	40-8-2	(Argentina) Cesar Gustavo Acevedo	TKO	2	27/11/2009	(Argentina) Club El Ceibo, San Francisco, Cordoba	
Loss	39-8-2	(Argentina) Lisandro Ezequiel Diaz	TKO	4	15/05/2009	(Argentina) Sociedad de Bomberos Voluntarios, San Francisco, Cordoba	Argentina Heavyweight Title.
Win	39-7-2	(Argentina) Mauro Adrian Ordiales	RTD	4	13/12/2008	(Argentina) Polideportivo Vicente Polimeni, Las Heras, Mendoza	Ordiales retired at 1:15 of the fourth round.
Win	38-7-2	(Argentina) Manuel Alberto Pucheta	DQ	1	11/07/2008	(Argentina) Club Defensores de Villa Lujan, San Miguel de Tucuman	Argentina Heavyweight Title.
Win	37-7-2	(Argentina) Hector Ricardo Sotelo	KO	2	16/02/2008	Estadio Ave Fenix, San Luis, Argentina	Sotelo knocked out at 2:33 of the second round.
Win	36-7-2	(Argentina) Lisandro Ezequiel Diaz	TKO	5	14/12/2007	Polideportivo Municipal Carlos Cerutti, Cordoba, Argentina	Argentina Heavyweight Title. Referee stopped the bout at 1:12 of the fifth round.
Win	35-7-2	(Argentina) Luis Oscar Ricail	KO	2	19/10/2007	Polideportivo Municipal Carlos Cerutti, Cordoba, Argentina	Ricail knocked out at 1:55 of the second round.
Loss	34-7-2	(Argentina) Marcelo Fabian Dominguez	TKO	6	02/12/2006	(Argentina) Estadio Diego Armando Maradona, Buenos Aires	Argentina/South America Heavyweight Titles. Referee stopped the bout at 0:59 of the sixth round.
Win	34-6-2	(Brazil) Marcos Celestino	KO	2	08/09/2006	(Argentina) Club Estudiantes, Hernando, Cordoba	
Loss	33-6-2	(Ukraine) Taras Bydenko	TKO	6	12/05/2006	Orfeo Superdomo, Cordoba, Argentina	WBA Fedelatin Heavyweight Title. Referee stopped the bout at 2:06 of the sixth round.
Win	33-5-2	(Argentina) Carlos Javier Ojeda Roldan	KO	5	06/01/2006	(Argentina) Anfiteatro Municipal, Rio Cuarto, Cordoba	Roldan knocked out at 3:00 of the fifth round.
Loss	32-5-2	(Argentina) Marcelo Fabian Dominguez	RTD	7	12/08/2005	Orfeo Superdomo, Cordoba, Argentina	South America/WBO Latino Heavyweight Titles. Moli retired at 2:13 of the seventh round.
Loss	32-4-2	(United Kingdom) Matt Skelton	TKO	6	25/02/2005	(United Kingdom) Wembley Conference Centre, Wembley, London	WBU World Heavyweight Title. Referee stopped the bout at 2:14 of the sixth round.
Win	32-3-2	(Argentina) Mariano Ramon Ocampo	UD	12	03/12/2004	Orfeo Superdomo, Cordoba, Argentina	WBC Mundo Hispano Heavyweight Title. 117.5-112.5, 118-110.5, 119-109.5.
Win	31-3-2	(Argentina) Manuel Hector Azar	KO	2	08/10/2004	Orfeo Superdomo, Cordoba, Argentina	WBC Mundo Hispano Heavyweight Title. Azar knocked out at 2:39 of the second round.
Win	30-3-2	(Argentina) Miguel Angel Antonio Aguirre	TKO	2	27/08/2004	Polideportivo Carlos Cerutti, Cordoba, Argentina	
Loss	29-3-2	(Ukraine) Wladimir Klitschko	KO	1	30/08/2003	(Germany) Olympiahalle, Munich, Bavaria	WBA Intercontinental Heavyweight Title. Moli knocked out at 1:49 of the first round.
Win	29-2-2	(Russia) Alexander Vasiliev	UD	10	13/06/2003	Orfeo Superdomo, Cordoba, Argentina	99.95.5, 100-92.5, 99.5-92.
Win	28-2-2	(Brazil) Edegar Da Silva	TKO	5	15/02/2003	(Argentina) Santa Rosa de Calamuchita, Cordoba	WBO Latino Heavyweight Title.
Loss	27-2-2	(Argentina) Marcelo Fabian Dominguez	UD	12	19/10/2002	(Argentina) Estadio Luna Park, Buenos Aires	South America/Argentina Heavyweight Titles.
Win	27-1-2	(Argentina) Pedro Daniel Franco	UD	8	15/03/2002	Club Social La Carlota, La Carlota, Argentina	79-77, 80-73.5, 79.5-76.
Win	26-1-2	(Argentina) Walter Armando Masseroni	TKO	2	25/01/2002	(Argentina) La Falda, Cordoba	Argentina Heavyweight Title.
Win	25-1-2	(Argentina) Jorge Alfredo Dascola	UD	10	30/11/2001	Club General Paz Juniors, Cordoba, Argentina	Argentina Heavyweight Title. 97-95, 97.5-95, 97-95.5.
NC	24-1-2	(Argentina) Walter Armando Masseroni	NC	2	06/10/2000	Cordoba, Argentina	WBA Fedelatin/WBO Latino/South America/Argentina Heavyweight Titles. Moli stripped of all four titles after the bout in which he kicked his opponent.
Win	24-1-1	(United States) Tony LaRosa	TKO	2	04/12/1999	Estadio Lanus, Lanus, Argentina	Referee stopped the bout at 2:54 of the second round.
Win	23-1-1	(Argentina) Jorge Alfredo Dascola	KO	2	17/09/1999	Cordoba, Argentina	WBO Latino Heavyweight Title. Dascola knocked out at 2:20 of the second round.
Win	22-1-1	(Argentina) Pedro Daniel Franco	UD	12	11/06/1999	Club General Paz Juniors, Cordoba, Argentina	WBA Fedelatin/South America/Argentina Heavyweight Titles. 118-116, 117-116, 116-115.
Win	21-1-1	(United States) Marcus Rhode	TKO	3	23/04/1999	San Luis, Argentina	
Win	20-1-1	(United States) Cleveland Woods	UD	10	13/02/1999	Cordoba, Argentina	
Win	19-1-1	(Argentina) Pedro Daniel Franco	TKO	8	11/12/1998	Club General Paz Juniors, Cordoba, Argentina	South America/Argentina Heavyweight Titles.
Win	18-1-1	(Argentina) Jorge Alfredo Dascola	TD	7	09/10/1998	Club General Paz Juniors, Cordoba, Argentina	
Win	17-1-1	(Uruguay) Juan Alberto Barrero	DQ	4	11/09/1998	(Argentina) Rio Cuarto, Cordoba	
Win	16-1-1	(Brazil) Marcos Celestino	KO	4	10/07/1998	(Argentina) Bell Ville	
Win	15-1-1	(Argentina) Luis Nelson Gonzalez	TKO	3	15/05/1998	(Argentina) Villa del Rosario, Cordoba	
Win	14-1-1	(Argentina) Mariano Ramon Ocampo	KO	6	03/04/1998	Cordoba, Argentina	South America Heavyweight Title.
Win	13-1-1	(Argentina) Daniel Eduardo Neto	MD	12	06/03/1998	(Argentina) Rio Tercero, Cordoba	South America Heavyweight Title.
Win	12-1-1	(United States) Tommy Mucciogrosso	TKO	2	06/02/1998	(Argentina) La Falda, Cordoba	
NC	11-1-1	(Argentina) Ricardo Alfredo Ibarra	NC	1	13/12/1997	Cordoba, Argentina	
Win	11-1-0	(Argentina) Mario Oscar Melo	UD	12	21/11/1997	(Argentina) Adelia Maria, Cordoba	South America Heavyweight Title.
Win	10-1-0	(Puerto Rico) Miguel Otero Ocasio	UD	10	31/10/1997	(Argentina) Villa Maria, Cordoba	
Win	9-1-0	(Brazil) Eduardo Luiz Dos Santos	RTD	6	27/09/1997	(Argentina) Jesus Maria, Cordoba	
Win	8-1-0	(Brazil) Juraci Dos Santos	KO	1	05/09/1997	(Argentina) Rio Tercero, Cordoba	
Win	7-1-0	(Argentina) Ricardo Alfredo Ibarra	RTD	9	15/08/1997	Cordoba, Argentina	
Win	6-1-0	(Brazil) Carlos Barcelete	KO	7	14/06/1997	Cordoba, Argentina	
Loss	5-1-0	(Argentina) Mariano Ramon Ocampo	UD	8	24/05/1997	(Argentina) Estadio F.A.B., Buenos Aires	
Win	5-0-0	(Paraguay) Angel Amarilla Garcia	KO	2	25/04/1997	(Argentina) Laborde, Cordoba	
Win	4-0-0	(Argentina) Alberto Toribio Coman	KO	2	04/04/1997	(Argentina) Villa del Rosario, Cordoba	
Win	3-0-0	(Argentina) Luis Nelson Gonzalez	TKO	3	14/03/1997	Cordoba, Argentina	
Win	2-0-0	(Brazil) Carlos Barcelete	UD	6	14/02/1997	(Argentina) Villa Carlos Paz, Cordoba Province	
Win	1-0-0	(Argentina) Alberto Toribio Coman	UD	4	25/01/1997	(Argentina) Villa Carlos Paz, Cordoba Province	

Preceded by Carolina Ardohaín	Bailando Por un Sueño (Argentina) Winner; Season 6 (May - December 2010)	Succeeded by Hernán Piquín
