= Chapa C =

Cuban reggaeton group

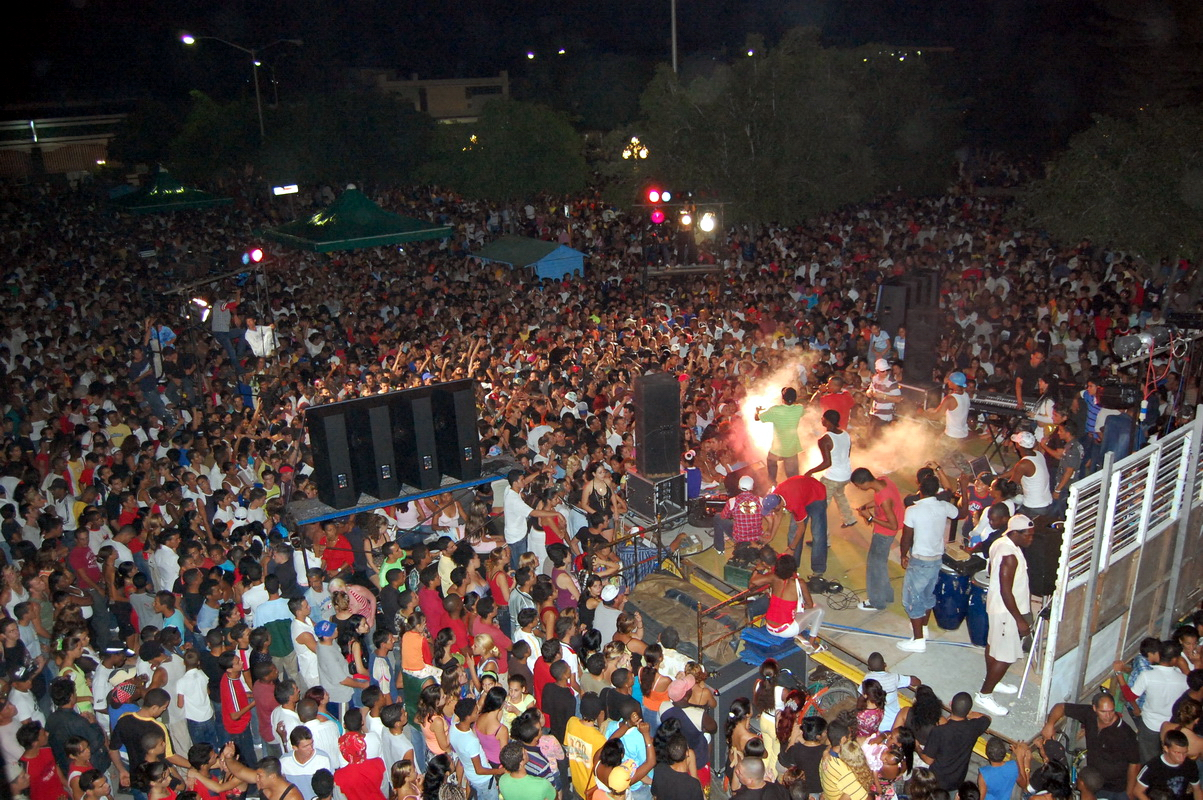
- Chapa C live in March 2008

Background information
- Also known as: Chapa Cuba (2004-2005); Shapa Se (2007-2008)
- Origin: Holguín, Cuba
- Genres: Reggaeton
- Years active: 2004–present
- Labels: eMefpi Music
- Members: Maikel Romera Alonso (Dave Jazzy Sam, formerly DJ Sam); Maurice Luis Montagne Maceiros (El Classico)
- Past members: Julio Esteban Haynes Pupo (Julito) (2004-2008); Idilio Márquez Amores (Rhagga) (2004-2009); Norge Rafael Hadfen (El Pollo) (2004); Justin Love (2006-2007)
- Website: http://www.chapac.com/

Chapa C is a Cuban reggaeton group led by Maikel Romera Alonso known by his stage name D.J. Sam. Initially the group was formed by Maikel Romera Alonso (D.J. Sam), Idilio Márquez Amores (Rhagga), Norge Rafael Hadfen (El Pollo) and Julio Esteban Haynes Pupo (Julito). Eventually El Pollo, Julito and Rhagga left the group, however, D.J. Sam decided to carry on with the project with former singer of TecnoCaribe Cuban group, Maurice Luis Montagne Maceiros, known as El Classico.

== Music career ==
=== Beginning (2003–2005) ===
Since early 2003, El Pollo and Julito had formed a group called Blanco y Negro, later called Doble Juego. In late 2003, they met D.J. Sam, who began his career as a music producer. Sam began producing tracks for Julito and El Pollo, and that's how a friendship between the three was formed. Later, in a rap and hip-hop competition, El Pollo met Rhagga, who joined Doble Juego.

In August 2004, El Pollo introduced to D.J. Sam a singer who produced his own tracks and composed his own songs, known as Rhagga, which was already working with them but still did not yet know D.J. Sam. Later that month, recorded his first song, titled "Pa' Que Tu Vea', and for the first time D.J. Sam is part of the recording as well as producing wanted to sing. In that song, Sam sang four words and that was the beginning of her singing career.

After this event, begins production of several singles by D.J. Sam and Rhagga, many of which could not be terminated by absence of some members. After an absence of Julito, they decided to record their second song was titled 'Ese Soy Yo', in which participated Rhagga and D.J. Sam.

On October 20, the group was renamed Chapa Cuba, and later was shortened to Chapa C by trade issues.

In the last two months of 2004, after absences of El Pollo, they recorded two songs that were entitled 'Nena' and 'Sé Que Tú Me Quieres', the latter written by Rhagga was a local success that propelled the group among the media.

Absences from El Pollo continued, and this caused him to be fired from the group finally left as a trio. After this event, the group published its first demo titled "Pa 'Que Tu Vea', consisting of five of his first songs, including songs that participated El Pollo, although no longer part of Chapa C.

Continued production of singles, and finally to end their May 2005 second official demo, entitled 'Rompiendo El Flow', which successes A Que Te Enamoras, Llorarás Por Mi, No Llores Por Él among others.

With the release of the demo, the first single, titled 'A Que Te Enamoras' was a hit in all the clubs and public parties of Cuba also reached an amazing 4th place in the radio program with the largest audience in the Holguín Province, competing with singers foreigners, which drew the attention of all producers and conductors of radio and television are interested on the group.

With the release of the second single, Amor, also known as Nuestra Separación or Llorarás Por Mi, follows the way of his predecessor and becomes a hit around the island.

=== Professional career (2005–2008) ===
In October 2005, the Provincial Center of Music of the city of Holguin, which it is the highest body representing artists, evaluated and added the group in its catalog.

A month later, the group began their careers as professional artists and did a local tour throughout the province of Holguin, which ended in February 2006 with about 40 concerts. In May 2006, the group released a third professional demo, which was entitled 'Emergency Of Love' containing six songs and a remix of the song Emergencia De Amor in reggaeton version. In August, Julito was claimed by the Provincial Court to serve a sentence of three years he had been in force since the end of 2004, this meant that the group disappear temporarily from the media and the concert schedule were suspended.

Three months later, D.J. Sam and Rhagga out to seek a temporary substitute for Julito, until it is released from prison. The choice was a young man named Justin Love. Already in February 2007, after the production of some singles, decide to dismiss the group Justin Love for misconduct, and eventually they had to spare by not producing new singles, decide to collaborate to Julito out of prison as soon possible.

In November 2007, Julito gets parole for good behavior, and resume the production of new songs. Finally, in a record time of one month, a production of 13 songs was completed. The day March 1, 2008, for the first time the group made an official presentation to the media of production promised album, which was titled 'No More Tears: The Real'. That same night, the album was released before the people at a concert in the central park of Holguín, attended by over 15,000 people.

=== International consolidation (2008–2009) ===
Months later, the songs of the album Rompiendo El Flow begin to sound abroad, entering from Bolivia to all of South America.

The single Llorarás Por Mi managed to be among the top ranking of the main stations of Argentina, Paraguay and Uruguay.

Hereby arise contact entrepreneurs and first production begins an international tour for the group.

By Julito justice problems, and the final sentence to be served until September 2009, justice denied going abroad, then they must find a substitute to meet the tour. The choice was El Classico, from the Cienfuegos Province, who had been part of the Cuban reggaeton group TecnoCaribe.

El Classico took the place of Julito and became the leading voice of Chapa C.

After the tours of Paraguay and Argentina, the group returns to Cuba to record a new version of 'Llorarás Por Mi', sung by El Classico, D.J. Sam and Rhagga, and its official video.

In November of that year, the group leaves Cuba and travels to South America for his second international tour, that's when they left Cuba and stayed to live in Paraguay.

=== Chapa C: D.J. Sam & El Classico (2009–present) ===
In May 2009, Rhagga travels to Cuba and decides to leave the group to start a solo career.

Several single's production begins by D.J. Sam and El Classico, and by April 2011 released a new album titled 'I Will Be: Like Big Stars' under the label eMefpi Music.

The group promoted a single, entitled Tú Me Seduces.

== Discography ==
Studio albums

- 2011: I Will Be: Like Big Stars

Compilation albums

- 2008: 100% Reggaeton Cubano
- 2011: Inédito, Vol. 1 (2004-2008)
- 2013: Inédito, Vol. 2 (2004-2008)

EPs

- 2007: No More Tears Baby
- 2007: Singles
- 2008: X Best Singles In Da World

Demo albums

- 2004: Pa' Que Tu Vea
- 2005: Rompiendo El Flow
- 2006: Emergency Of Love
- 2008: No More Tears: The Real
