= 49th Martín Fierro Awards =

49th Annual Martín Fierro Awards
- Awarded for: Martín Fierro Awards for 2018 Argentine television and radio programs
- Sponsored by: Asociación de Periodistas de la Televisión y Radiofonía Argentina
- Date: June 23, 2019
- Location: Hilton Buenos Aires
- Country: Argentina
- Hosted by: Marley
- Act: Tini
- Reward: Martín Fierro Awards
- First award: 2019

Television/radio coverage
- Network: Telefe

The 49th Annual Martín Fierro Awards, presented by the Asociación de Periodistas de la Televisión y Radiofonía Argentina (APTRA), was held on June 23, 2019. It was held at the Hilton Buenos Aires located in Buenos Aires. During the ceremony, APTRA announced the Martín Fierro Awards for 2018 Argentine television and radio programs. The ceremony was hosted by Marley and was broadcast on Telefe. Telefe had broadcast the previous years awards.

The shortlists were announced on May 13 on the Cortá por Lozano program.

The singer Tini opened the ceremony with a musical act, performing her song "22".

== Awards ==
Winners are listed first and highlighted in boldface. Other nominations are listed in alphabetic order.

Best daily fiction	Best miniseries
**100 días para enamorarse**; Simona; Mi hermano es un clon	**El Lobista**; El marginal; Sandro de América (TV series)
Best lead actor in daily fiction/comedy	Best lead actress in daily fiction/comedy
**Juan Minujín** (for 100 días para enamorarse); Nicolás Cabré (for Mi hermano es un clon); Luciano Castro (for 100 días para enamorarse)	**Carla Peterson** (for 100 días para enamorarse); Gimena Accardi (for Mi hermano es un clon); Nancy Dupláa (for 100 días para enamorarse)
Best lead actor in miniseries	Best lead actress in miniseries
**Antonio Grimau** (for Sandro de América (TV series)); Marco Antonio Caponi (for Sandro de América (TV series)); Gerardo Romano (for El marginal)	**Leticia Brédice** (for El Lobista); Claudia Lapacó (for La caída); Griselda Siciliani (for Morir de amor)
Best supporting actor	Best supporting actress
**Roly Serrano** (for El marginal); Luis Machín (for El Lobista, Mi hermano es un clon and Sandro de América (TV series)); Juan Gil Navarro (for 100 días para enamorarse); Pablo Rago (for 100 días para enamorarse)	**Maite Lanata** (for 100 días para enamorarse); Jorgelina Aruzzi (for 100 días para enamorarse); Julieta Nair Calvo (for El Lobista, Mi hermano es un clon and Las Estrellas)
Best writer	Best newcomer
**Silvina Frejdkes**, **Ernesto Korovsky** & **Alejandro Quesada** (for 100 días para enamorarse); Nicolas Allegro & Patricio Vega (for El Lobista); Joaquin Bonet & Adrián Caetano (for Sandro de América (TV series))	**Agustín Sullivan** (for Sandro de América (TV series)); Agustín Casanova (for Simona); Stefanía Roitman (for Simona)
Best humoristic program	Best cultural/educational TV program
**Peligro: sin codificar**; Bendita; Polémica en el bar	**La liga de la ciencia**; El arqui, las paredes hablan; Marcha
Best sports program	Best cooking program
**2018 Summer Youth Olympics**; Pasión por el fútbol; Tribuna caliente	**La peña de morfi**; Cocineros argentinos
Best journalistic program	Best news reporter
**Animales Sueltos**; Cada noche; Debo decir	**Guillermo Panizza** (for Telefe Noticias); Dominique Metzger (for Telenoche); Valeria Sampedro (for Arriba Argentinos & Notitrece)
Best male journalist	Best female journalist
**Nicolás Wiñazki** (for Telenoche); Raúl Kollmann (for Telenueve); Reynaldo Sietecase (for Telefe Noticias)	**Debora Plager** (for Intratables); Luciana Geuna (for Periodismo para todos & Telenoche); Romina Manguel (for Animales Sueltos)
Best panelist	Best TV program for kids
**Paulo Vilouta** (for Intratables); Marina Calabró (for El diario de Mariana & Intrusos en el espectáculo); Lizy Tagliani (for Cortá por Lozano)	**Panam y circo**; Morfi Kids; Piñón en familia
Best TV News	Best entertaining program
**Telefe noticias a las 20**; Buenos días América; Telenoche; TPA noticias	**La Tribuna de Guido**; La voz; Pasapalabra (Argentina)
Best reality show	Best general interest program
**Showmatch**; Bake Off Argentina, El Gran Pastelero; Cuestión de peso	**La noche de Mirtha Legrand**; Como todo; PH, podemos hablar
Best magazine	Best work in humor
**Cortá por Lozano**; El diario de Mariana; Involucrados	Lizy Tagliani (for ¿En qué mano está? & Cortá por Lozano); Martín Campilongo (for Peligro: sin codificar); Álvaro Navia (for Polémica en el bar)
Best director	Best general production
**Adrián Caetano** (for Sandro de América (TV series)); Mariano Ardanaz & Pablo Ambrosini (for 100 días para enamorarse); Daniel Barone (for El Lobista)	**Susana Giménez**; Por el mundo; Sandro de América (TV series); Showmatch
Best male TV host	Best female TV host
**Alejandro Wiebe** (for Por el mundo & La voz); Mariano Iúdica (for Involucrados & Polémica en el bar); Andy Kusnetzoff (for PH, podemos hablar); Marcelo Tinelli (for Showmatch)	**Verónica Lozano** (for Cortá por Lozano); Moria Casán (for Incorrectas & Intrusos en el espectáculo); Pamela David (for Pamela a la tarde); Mirtha Legrand (for Almorzando con Mirtha Legrand & La noche de Mirtha)
Best advertisement	Best opening theme
**Spoiler Land** (by Don for Cablevisión); Pensás mejor (by Liebre Amotinada for YPF); Te tocó nacer acá (by Grey Argentina for Coca-Cola)	**El marginal** (by Sara Hebe for El marginal); A punto (by Amigos Raros for 100 días para enamorarse); Simona va (by Ángela Torres for Simona)
Plaque	Martín Fierro Award: Lifetime Achievement
In recognition of 60th anniversary of APTRA: **Carlos Sciacaluga**; **Jorge Lafauci**; **Francisco Loiácono**	**Marcelo Tinelli**
Golden Martín Fierro Award	
**100 días para enamorarse**	

== In Memoriam ==
As is tradition an in memoriam segment tribute was paid to the artists who had died between June 2018 and June 2019. The Venezuelan singer Ricardo Montaner sung the song "Cuando un amigo se va" authored by the singer-songwriter Alberto Cortez who was one of those artist being remembered. The song was sung while images of the deceased artists were shown.

However, a number of names were missing from the list, including Guillermo Bredeston. Before the Golden Martín Fierro announcement president of APTRA, Luis Ventura, got on stage to apologize blaming a digital error for the omissions before playing the video again with the missing artists added.

- María Concepción César
- David Llewellyn
- Juan Carlos Mastrángelo
- Diana Álvarez
- Eva Kerr
- Guillermo Marín
- Kive Staiff
- Julio Blanck
- Guillermo Bredeston
- Julián Carranza
- Choly Berreteaga
- Héctor Nogués
- Beatriz Seibel
- Adolfo Duncan
- Elsa Bloise
- Mónica Galán
- Reneé Roxana Darín
- Paula Solarz
- Alicia Berdaxágar
- Miguel Padilla
- Ana María Alfaro
- Violeta Rivas
- Raúl Schurlein
- Thelma Tixou
- Amelia Teruel
- Sergio Mazzitelli
- Pier Fritzsche
- Rafael Blanco
- Hernán Pairetti
- Tito Hurovich
- Yiyo Ortiz
- Osvaldo Bayer
- Sebastián Seijas
- Alejandro Hodara
- Raúl Ramos
- Chango Juárez
- Pablo Guglielmino
- Aldo Kaiser
- Amelia Vargas
- Daniel Kargieman
- Lorenzo Quinteros
- Carlos Garaycochea
- Betty Elizalde
- Norberto Biosca
- Rodolfo Roca
- Claudio Torres
- Siro San Roman
- Jaime Torres
- Horacio Molina
- Natacha Jaitt
- Rodolfo Cela
- Leonardo Satragno
- Graciela Araujo
- Ulises Butrón
- Nicolás Feuermann
- Isaac Fajn
- José Franchino Arnaiz
- Pancho Guerrero
- Analía Gadé
- Lucho Avilés
- Christian Bach
- Alfredo Martín Ábalos
- Beatriz Taibo
- Hermenegildo Sábat
- Tuqui
- Silvina Bosco
- Alberto Cortez
