= Bailando 2016 =

- Season 11
- Presented by: Marcelo Tinelli

Release
- Original network: El Trece
- Original release: 30 May – 19 December 2016

Season chronology
- ← Previous; Bailando 2015 Next → Bailando 2017

Bailando 2016 is the eleventh season of Bailando por un Sueño. The season premiere aired on 30 May 2016, on El Trece. However, the competition started a day later, on 31 May. Marcelo Tinelli, once again, was the host for the show's.

On 19 December 2016, theatre producer & actor Pedro Alfonso and reality TV star Florencia Vigna were announced winners. Singer Ezequiel Cwirkaluk and dancer & TV personality Bárbara Silenzi finished second.

== Cast ==
=== Teams ===
Initially, 26 teams were confirmed. This season 5 couples made up of celebrities participate, they are: Federico Bal & Laura Fernández (winners of the previous edition, defenders of the title); Ezequiel Cwirkaluk & Bárbara Silenzi; Martín Liberman & Marcela Greco; Pedro Alfonso & Florencia Vigna and Oscar Ruggeri & Candela Ruggeri. Later, one more celebrity couple will join (Anita & Marcos).

On 7 June, Bárbara Vélez, one of the celebrities announced in the program, withdraws for personal reasons from the competition before her debut. On 22 June, before meeting the first eliminated couple, Alejandro Lerner withdrew from the competition for personal reasons. More resignations were presented throughout the program: Fabián Doman, Martín Liberman & Marcela Greco, Fernando Vázquez and Agustín Casanova.

For the first time in the show's history, a celebrity (singer Marta Sánchez) was disqualified for not showing up to dance when she was summoned.

In the third round, the lawyer and television personality Fernanda Herrera joined. Faced with the massive resignations, the production decided to incorporate new couples to the competition (after round 8). The production chose Bárbara Vélez to rejoin the contest, after her scandalous exit from the contest before her debut, and to incorporate Nicole Neumann, Lizy Tagliani, Anita Martínez & Marcos Gómez (winners of Bailando 2014) and Carla Conte (winner of Bailando por un sueño 3).

Subsequently, Vélez withdraws (for the second time) from the competition. It is the first time in the history of Bailando that this happens.

Team	Status	Ref.
Bárbara «Barbie» Vélez (Note: Withdrew for personal reasons.) (Note: Bárbara Velez and her team returned in round 9.) (Model & actress): Professional partner: Maximiliano Buitrago; Choreographer: Lorena Portillo	Withdrew on 7 June 2016	
Alejandro Lerner (Musician, singer & songwriter): Professional partner: Nina Iraolagoitia (Note: She returned in rounds 4 and 5, as temporary replacement for Florencia Vigna.); Choreographer: María José de la Iglesia (Note: Returned in round 3, as Fernanda Herrera's team.)	Withdrew on 22 June 2016	
María del Mar Cuello Molar (Model): Professional partner: Fernando Bertona; Choreographer: Cecilia Estévez	Eliminated 1st on 22 June 2016	
Julio Iglesias Jr. (Singer): Professional partner: Julieta Vaccarelli; Choreographer: Mariela Anchipi (Note: Returned in round 9, as Nicole Neumann's team.)	Eliminated 2nd on 4 July 2016	
Fabián Doman (Journalist & TV and radio host): Professional partner: Bárbara Reali; Choreographer: Alejandro Lavallén	Withdrew on 15 July 2016	
Evander Holyfield (Former professional boxer): Professional partner: Judith Kovalovsky; Choreographer: Cyntia Vargas	Eliminated 3rd on 18 July 2016	
Pamela Sosa (Vedette): Professional partner: Alejandro Gallego; Choreographer: Sabrina Sansone	Eliminated 4th on 2 August 2016	
Marta Sánchez (Note: Marta Sánchez was disqualified by decision of the production, after not appearing in round of Folklore.) (Singer): Professional partner: Joel Ledesma; Choreographer: Cristina Girona	Disqualified on 18 August 2016	
Miriam «Militta» Bora (Singer): Professional partner: Iván Anríquez; Choreographer: Bárbara Majule	Eliminated 5th on 18 August 2016	
Martín Liberman (Sports journalist & TV and radio host) Marcela Greco (Martín Liberman's woman): Choreographer: Georgina Tirotta (Note: Returned in round 9, as Lizy Tagliani's team.)	Withdrew on 29 August 2016	
Fernando Carrillo (Model & actor): Professional partner: Camila Méndez Ribeiro; Choreographer: Nadia Hair	Eliminated 6th on 1 September 2016	
Ernestina Pais (TV and radio host): Professional partner: Marcos Beierbach (Note: Returned in round 9, as Carla Conte's team.); Choreographer: Ariel Pastochi	Eliminated 7th on 12 September 2016	
Fernando «Fer» Vázquez (Note: Withdrew for work reasons.) (Singer & songwriter): Professional partner: Estefanía Pais; Choreographer: Verónica Paschiero	Withdrew on 20 September 2016	
Fernanda Herrera (Lawyer & TV personality): Professional partner: Fernando Bertona; Choreographer: María José de la Iglesia	Eliminated 8th on 20 September 2016	
Agustín Casanova (Singer & songwriter): Professional partner: Josefina Oriozabala; Choreographer: Matías Ramos	Withdrew on 29 September 2016	
Diego Maradona Jr. (Footballer): Professional partner: Yamila Ramírez; Choreographer: Marcos Gorosito	Eliminated 9th on 29 September 2016	
Lizy Tagliani (Comedian, actress, stylist & announcer): Professional partner: Carlos Bernal; Choreographer: Georgina Tirotta	Eliminated 10th on 7 October 2016	
Osvaldo Laport (Actor, theatre director & singer): Professional partner: Macarena Rinaldi; Choreographer: Nazarena Amaya	Eliminated 11th on 17 October 2016	
Anita Martínez (Comedian, actress & former dancer) Marcos «Bicho» Gómez (Comedian, actor & circus artist): Choreographer: Leandro Delpiero	Eliminated 12th on 25 October 2016	
Favio Posca (Actor & comedian): Professional partner: Soledad Bayona; Choreographer: Facundo Mazzei (Note: Gustavo Carrizo was originally the couple's choreographer. He withdrew from the competition in round 12.)	Eliminated 13th on 1 November 2016	
Oscar Ruggeri (Former footballer) Candela Ruggeri (Model): Choreographer: Carla Lanzi	Eliminated 14th on 11 November 2016	
Sabrina Rojas (Model & actress): Professional partner: Cristián Ponce; Choreographer: Gastón Tavagnutti	Eliminated 15th on 21 November 2016	
Bárbara «Barbie» Vélez (Model & actress): Professional partner: Maximiliano Buitrago; Choreographer: Lorena Portillo	Withdrew on 24 November 2016	
Iliana Calabró (Actress): Professional partner: Fernando Castro; Choreographer: Paola García	Eliminated 16th on 28 November 2016	
Carla Conte (TV host): Professional partner: Marcos Beierbach; Choreographer: Verónica Pécollo	Eliminated 17th on 5 December 2016	
Charlotte Caniggia (Reality TV star & model): Professional partner: Juan Leandro Nimo; Choreographer: Mariela Peña	Eliminated 18th on 8 December 2016	
Ángela Torres (Actress & singer): Professional partner: Facundo Insúa; Choreographer: María Laura «La Cata» Cattalini	Eliminated 19th on 12 December 2016	
Nicole Neumann (Model): Professional partner: Jorge Moliniers; Choreographer: Mariela «La Chipi» Anchipi	Eliminated 20th on 13 December 2016	
Federico Bal (Actor, producer & director theatre) Laura «Laurita» Fernández (Dancer & TV and radio host): Choreographer: Matías Napp	Semi-finalists on 14 December 2016	
María «Mery» del Cerro (Model & actress): Professional partner: Nicolás Villalba; Choreographer: Hernán Alegre	Semi-finalists on 16 December 2016	
Ezequiel «El Polaco» Cwirkaluk (Singer) Bárbara «Barby» Silenzi (Dancer & TV personality): Choreographer: Enrique Pérez	Runners-up on 19 December 2016	
Pedro «Peter» Alfonso (Theatre producer & actor) Florencia «Flor» Vigna (Reality TV star): Choreographer: Mariano Botindari	Winners on 19 December 2016	

- In quotation marks («»), the nicknames.

=== Judges ===
The panel of judges will be made up of five personalities associated with the world of dance, theater, acting, modeling and television. Four of them return from the previous edition: de Brito, Casán, Silveyra and Polino. Ardohaín (who was the winner of the fifth edition) joined the panel as a new judge.

- Ángel de Brito (Journalist & TV and radio host)
- Carolina «Pampita» Ardohaín (Model, actress & former dancer)
- Moria Casán (Actress, former vedette, former dancer & TV personality)
- Soledad Silveyra (Actress)
- Marcelo Polino (Journalist & TV and radio host)

After two seasons, Nacha Guevara did not return as a permanent judge this season, though she did return as a guest judge the several night to replace Ardohaín. Other celebrities who occupied Ardohaín's chair were María Laura «Lolo» Rossi (dancer & choreographer. Also head of choreographers on the show), Florencia de la V (actress, former vedette & TV host) and Mariana «Lali» Espósito (actress, singer-songwriter & dancer).

Other guest judges were Flavio Mendoza (artistic director & choreographer), Graciela Alfano (model, former actress & former vedette) and María Vázquez (model) replacing de Brito, Silveyra and Casán, respectively.

== Scoring chart ==
Place	Celebrity(-ies)	1	2	3	4	5	6	7	8	9	10	11	12	13	14	15	16	17	18	19	20	SF		F
Place	Celebrity(-ies)	1	2	3	4	5	6	7	8	9	10	11	12	13	14	15	16	17	18	19	20	1	2	F
1	Pedro & Florencia	47	44	38	41 (Note: Florencia Vigna was replaced by Nina Iraolagoitia.)	44	48	37	41	32	44	43	45	38	43	42	35	45	41	45	A		6	6
2	Ezequiel & Barby	41	32	29	37	42	30	47	46	31	28	44	36	45	40	30	31	27	37	48	A	6		2
3	Mery	44	37	44	37	43	40	30	48	44	47	45	46	48	50	34	44	43	44	44	A		2	
3	Federico & Laura	46	40	38	44	42	45	47	32	28	48	47	37	44	49	37	50	49	45	46	A	2		
5	Nicole									50	34	40	39	33	40	37	35	47	44	37	A			
6	Ángela	47	42	41	29	— (Note: In round 5, Ángela Torres could not dance due to injury and was sent to the telephone duel.)	42	37	48	40	42	40	37	49	46	44	47	46	45	42				
7	Charlotte	31	26	37	41	33	33	18	27	28	38	9	40	26	32	45	35	43	41					
8	Carla									42	30	41	42	29	49	40	39 (Note: Carla Conte was replaced by Lizy Tagliani.)	30						
9	Iliana	44	32	29	42	28	34	42	50	39	48	33	43	37	40	30	35							
10	Barbie	—								46	35	42	37	33	27	48	—							
11	Sabrina	47	29	33	33	45	48	23	32	41	42	37	43	33	43	30								
12	Oscar & Candela	41	40	29	47	35	30	27	42	34	42	36	30	40	40									
13	Favio	47	48	48	39	43	40	45	46	45	42	38	42	33										
14	Anita & Bicho									44	34	33	30											
15	Osvaldo	40	36	34	42	45	46	34	25	43	37	30												
16	Lizy									43	34													
17	Diego	35	36	36	34	28	39	27	32	32														
18	Agustín	47	48	46	33	44	43	42	42	—														
19	Fernanda			29	29	33	44	18	32															
20	Fernando V.	40	44	38	36	46	44	40	23															
21	Ernestina	43	37	40	36	45	38	27																
22	Fernando C.	31	33	33	33	38	34																	
23	Martín & Marcela	31	35	38 (Note: Marcela Greco was replaced by Georgina Tirotta, choreographer of the couple.)	33	37	17																	
24	Militta	38	29	33	33	28																		
25	Marta	39	39	29	33	— (Note: In round 5, Marta Sánchez was automatically eliminated from the competition for not showing up to the round of Folklore.)																		
26	Pamela	21	26	27	26																			
27	Evander	32	37	33																				
28	Fabián	33	26	27																				
29	Julio	20	26																					
30	María	31																						
31	Alejandro	43																						
Minimum score to be saved		32	33	34	34	36	35	28	33	33	35	34	38	34	41	38	40	44	45	45	—			

Red numbers indicate the lowest score for each style.
Green numbers indicate the highest score for each style.
Indicates the couple sentenced.
Indicates the couple was saved by the judges.
Indicates the couple was saved by the public.
Indicates the couple eliminated that round.
Indicates the couple withdrew from the competition.
Indicates the couple was disqualified by the production.
Indicates the winning couple.
Indicates the runner-up couple.
Indicates the semi-finalists couples.

Notes:

- In italics, partial scores without the secret vote.
- A: All couples are sent to duel to define the semifinalists.
- "—" indicates the couple(s) did not dance that round.

== Rounds ==
Individual judges' scores in the charts below (given in parentheses) are listed in this order from left to right: Ángel de Brito, Pampita Ardohaín, Moria Casán, Soledad Silveyra, Marcelo Polino.

- Secret vote is in **bold text**.

=== Round 1: Disco ===
Running order

Song and scores
Date	Couple	Song	Scores
31 Mayth	Evander Holyfield & Judith Kovalovsky	«Hot Stuff» (Donna Summer)	32 (6, 8, 5, **10**, 3)
31 Mayth	Marta Sánchez & Joel Ledesma	«Believe» (Cher)	39 (8, 8, 7, **9**, 7)
2 Junend	Charlotte Caniggia & Juan Leandro Nimo	«Teenage Dream» (Katy Perry)	31 (6, 8, 7, **6**, 4)
2 Junend	Fabián Doman & Bárbara Reali	«Disco Inferno» (Tina Turner)	33 (8, 9, 8, **5**, 3)
3 Junerd	Oscar Ruggeri & Candela Ruggeri	«Last Dance» (Donna Summer)	41 (10, 9, 7, **10**, 5)
3 Junerd	Ángela Torres & Facundo Insúa	«Canned Heat» (Jamiroquai)	47 (10, 10, 10, **10**, 7)
3 Junerd	María del Mar Cuello Molar & Fernando Bertona	«Just Dance» (Lady Gaga)	31 (4, 9, 7, **6**, 5)
3 Junerd	Ezequiel Cwirkaluk & Bárbara Silenzi	«Get Lucky» (Daft Punk)	41 (7, 9, 10, **10**, 5)
7 Juneth	Bárbara Vélez & Maximiliano Buitrago	Did not dance. Her withdrew from the competition.	
7 Juneth	Pedro Alfonso & Florencia Vigna	«Love Never Felt So Good» (Michael Jackson feat. Justin Timberlake)	47 (10, 9, 10, **10**, 8)
7 Juneth	Osvaldo Laport & Macarena Rinaldi	«Ladies' Night» (Atomic Kitten)	40 (8, 9, 8, **10**, 5)
7 Juneth	Fernando Carrillo & Camila Méndez Ribeiro	«You Should Be Dancing» (Bee Gees)	31 (5, 9, 6, **7**, 4)
8 Juneth	Diego Maradona, Jr. & Yamila Ramírez	«Sexy Bitch» (David Guetta feat. Akon)	35 (8, 8, 5, **8**, 6)
8 Juneth	Iliana Calabró & Fernando Castro	«Hush Hush; Hush Hush» (The Pussycat Dolls)	44 (8, 10, 10, **9**, 7)
9 Juneth	Federico Bal & Laura Fernández	«Uptown Funk» (Mark Ronson feat. Bruno Mars)	46 (10, 10, 9, **10**, 7)
13 Juneth	Agustín Casanova & Josefina Oriozabala	«Moves Like Jagger» (Maroon 5)	47 (10, 10, 10, **10**, 7)
13 Juneth	Pamela Sosa & Alejandro Gallego	«Any Which Way» (Scissor Sisters)	21 (3, 7, 5, **6**, 0)
13 Juneth	Favio Posca & Soledad Bayona	«Le Freak» (Chic)	47 (9, 10, 10, **10**, 8)
15 Juneth	Julio Iglesias Jr. & Julieta Vaccarelli	«Can't Stop the Feeling!» (Justin Timberlake)	20 (1, 7, 4, **8**, 0)
15 Juneth	Fernando Vázquez & Estefanía Pais	«Treasure» (Bruno Mars)	40 (7, 10, 7, **10**, 6)
16 Juneth	Alejandro Lerner & Nina Iraolagoitia	«September» (Earth, Wind & Fire)	43 (8, 10, 9, **9**, 7)
16 Juneth	Martín Liberman & Marcela Greco	«Love Today» (Mika)	31 (3, 8, 6, **9**, 5)
16 Juneth	Miriam Bora & Iván Anríquez	«Be With You» (Atomic Kitten)	38 (6, 9, 8, **9**, 6)
17 Juneth	Sabrina Rojas & Cristián Ponce	«Celebration» (Kylie Minogue)	47 (10, 10, 10, **9**, 8)
17 Juneth	Ernestina Pais & Marcos Beierbach	«Boogie Wonderland» (Earth, Wind & Fire)	43 (9, 10, 8, **9**, 7)
17 Juneth	María del Cerro & Nicolás Villalba	«Calling All Hearts» (DJ Cassidy feat. Robin Thicke & Jessie J)	44 (9, 9, 9, **9**, 8)

Red numbers indicate the lowest score
Green numbers indicate the highest score
Sentenced: Julio Iglesias Jr. & Julieta Vaccarelli (20), Pamela Sosa & Alejandro Gallego (21), Charlotte Caniggia & Juan Leandro Nimo (31), Fernando Carrillo & Camila Méndez Ribeiro (31), María del Mar Cuello Molar & Fernando Bertona (31) and Martín Liberman & Marcela Greco (31)
Saved by the judges: Charlotte Caniggia & Juan Leandro Nimo, Fernando Carrillo & Camila Méndez Ribeiro, Julio Iglesias Jr. & Julieta Vaccarelli and Martín Liberman & Marcela Greco
Saved by the public: Pamela Sosa & Alejandro Gallego (51.66%)
Eliminated: María del Mar Cuello Molar & Fernando Bertona (48.34%)
Withdrew: Bárbara Vélez & Maximiliano Buitrago and Alejandro Lerner & Nina Iraolagoitia

=== Round 2: Cumbia ===
Running order

Song and scores
Date	Couple	Song	Scores
20 June	Pedro Alfonso & Florencia Vigna	«Loquita» (Márama)	44 (10, 9, **8**, 10, 7)
20 June	Oscar Ruggeri & Candela Ruggeri	«Canta» (Vi-Em)	40 (8, 8, **7**, 10, 7)
22 June	Federico Bal & Laura Fernández	«Ciudad mágica» (Agapornis)	40 (9, 10, (Note: Replaced by Lolo Rossi.) **7**, 10, 4)
22 June	Ángela Torres & Facundo Insúa	«Amores como el nuestro» (Canto para bailar)	42 (9, 8, **8**, 10, 7)
22 June	Fernando Carrillo & Camila Méndez Ribeiro	«Tan enamorados» (Los Totora)	33 (4, 7, **9**, 8, 5)
23 June	Julio Iglesias Jr. & Julieta Vaccarelli (Note: Sent to the telephone vote for not presenting to the duel.)	«Enamorarnos bailando» (The Panas)	26 (6, 5, **6**, 7, 2)
23 June	Marta Sánchez & Joel Ledesma	«La llave» (Agapornis)	39 (8, 7, **7**, 9, 8)
23 June	Osvaldo Laport & Macarena Rinaldi	«¡Corre!» (Agapornis)	36 (8, 8, **7**, 9, 4)
24 June	Charlotte Caniggia & Juan Leandro Nimo	«Adiós» (Rombai)	26 (5, 6, **6**, 6, 3)
24 June	Ezequiel Cwirkaluk & Bárbara Silenzi	«Deja de llorar» (Ezequiel Cwirkaluk)	32 (2, 6, **9**, 7, 8)
24 June	Ernestina Pais & Marcos Beierbach	«Sólo necesito» (#TocoParaVos)	37 (5, 7, **8**, 9, 8)
24 June	Miriam Bora & Iván Anríquez	«Te amo y odio» (Márama)	29 (4, 6, **7**, 9, 3)
27 June	Iliana Calabró & Fernando Castro	«Una noche contigo» (Márama feat. Fernando Vázquez)	32 (8, 7, **5**, 9, 3)
27 June	Favio Posca & Soledad Bayona	«Locuras contigo» (Rombai)	48 (10, 10, **10**, 10, 8)
27 June	María del Cerro & Nicolás Villalba	«Yo te propongo» (Rombai)	37 (8, 9, **7**, 8, 5)
28 June	Evander Holyfield & Judith Kovalovsky	«Todo comenzó bailando» (Márama)	37 (7, 8, **7**, 9, 6)
28 June	Sabrina Rojas & Cristián Ponce	«Fantasmas» (Los Bonnitos)	29 (4, 7, **7**, 8, 3)
28 June	Martín Liberman & Marcela Greco	«Quiero verte bailar» (Vi-Em feat. Grupo Play)	35 (6, 7, **7**, 9, 6)
28 June	Fernando Vázquez & Estefanía Pais	«Noche loca» (Márama feat. Rombai)	44 (9, 9, **9**, 10, 7)
30 June	Diego Maradona, Jr. & Yamila Ramírez	«Hasta el final» (Los Arándanos)	36 (6, (Note: Replaced by Flavio Mendoza.) 8, **7**, 9, 6)
30 June	Fabián Doman & Bárbara Reali	«Bailar pegados» (Los Totora)	26 (4, 7, **6**, 6, 3)
30 June	Agustín Casanova & Josefina Oriozabala	«Nena» (Márama)	48 (10, 10, **10**, 10, 8)
1 July	Pamela Sosa & Alejandro Gallego	«Persiana americana» (Agapornis)	26 (2, 7, **8**, 7, 2)

Red numbers indicate the lowest score
Green numbers indicate the highest score

Sentenced: Charlotte Caniggia & Juan Leandro Nimo (26), Fabián Domán & Bárbara Reali (26), Julio Iglesias Jr. & Julieta Vaccarelli (26), Pamela Sosa & Alejandro Gallego (26), Miriam Bora & Iván Anríquez (29), Sabrina Rojas & Cristián Ponce (29), Ezequiel Cwirkaluk & Bárbara Silenzi (32) and Iliana Calabró & Fernando Castro (32)
Saved by the judges: Iliana Calabró & Fernando Castro, Sabrina Rojas & Cristián Ponce, Ezequiel Cwirkaluk & Bárbara Silenzi, Miriam Bora & Iván Anríquez, Charlotte Caniggia & Juan Leandro Nimo and Fabián Domán & Bárbara Reali
Saved by the public: Pamela Sosa & Alejandro Gallego (51.07%)
Eliminated: Julio Iglesias Jr. & Julieta Vaccarelli (48.93%)

=== Round 3: Street pop ===
Running order

Song and scores
Date	Couple	Song	Scores
4 July	Federico Bal & Laura Fernández	«Bitch Better Have My Money» (Rihanna)	38 (6, **10**, 7, 10, 5)
4 July	Osvaldo Laport & Macarena Rinaldi	«Locked Out of Heaven» (Bruno Mars)	34 (5, **9**, 8, 9, 3)
4 July	Miriam Bora & Iván Anríquez	«Focus» (Ariana Grande)	33 (5, **9**, 6, 8, 5)
5 July	Sabrina Rojas & Cristián Ponce	«Burnin' Up» (Jessie J feat. 2 Chainz)	33 (5, **9**, 7, 8, 4)
5 July	Ángela Torres & Facundo Insúa	«Bitch I'm Madonna» (Madonna & Nicki Minaj)	41 (6, **10**, 10, 9, 6)
5 July	Evander Holyfield & Judith Kovalovsky (Note: Sent to the telephone vote for not presenting to the duel.)	«Lean On» (Major Lazer feat. DJ Snake & MØ)	33 (4, **6**, 9, 9, 5)
7 July	Pedro Alfonso & Florencia Vigna	«Want to Want Me» (Jason Derulo)	38 (5, **10**, 9, 9, 5)
7 July	Fabián Doman & Bárbara Reali (Note: On 15 July, the day the round was completed and the duel took place, the salvation of the judges was unfinished (it was to be defined on 18 July) because one more couple had to be saved. The judges would have to decide whether to save the couple Fabián Domán & Bárbara Reali or Fernanda Herrera & Fernando Bertona (the couple of Evander Holyfield & Judith Kovalovsky was already in the telephone vote for not show up in the duel). Therefore, the couple not saved by the judges would face Holyfield in the public vote. But Fabián Doman decided to withdraw from the competition. Consequently, Fernanda Herrera and Fernando Bertona were sent directly to the telephone vote.)	«Sugar» (Maroon 5)	27 (1, **6**, 8, 7, 5)
7 July	Pamela Sosa & Alejandro Gallego	«Where Have You Been» (Rihanna)	27 (2, **8**, 6, 8, 3)
7 July	Fernando Carrillo & Camila Méndez Ribeiro	«Come with Me» (Ricky Martin)	33 (4, **9**, 7, 8, 5)
8 July	Charlotte Caniggia & Juan Leandro Nimo	«Shake It Off» (Taylor Swift)	37 (7, **8**, 9, 6, 7)
8 July	Ezequiel Cwirkaluk & Bárbara Silenzi	«Turn Up the Music» (Chris Brown)	29 (4, **8**, 6, 8, 3)
8 July	Ernestina Pais & Marcos Beierbach	«Bang Bang» (Jessie J, Ariana Grande & Nicki Minaj)	40 (6, **10**, 9, 10, 5)
8 July	María del Cerro & Nicolás Villalba	«No» (Meghan Trainor)	44 (7, **10**, 10, 10, 7)
11 July	Iliana Calabró & Fernando Castro	«Hey Mama» (David Guetta feat. Nicki Minaj, Bebe Rexha & Afrojack)	29 (3, **8**, 7, 9, 2)
11 July	Agustín Casanova & Josefina Oriozabala	«What Do You Mean?» (Justin Bieber)	46 (9, **10**, 10, 10, 7)
11 July	Martín Liberman & Georgina Tirotta (Note: Replacement for Marcela Greco.)	«Cake by the Ocean» (DNCE)	38 (5, **8**, 9, 9, 7)
12 July	Diego Maradona, Jr. & Yamila Ramírez	«I'm a Freak» (Enrique Iglesias feat. Pitbull)	36 (7, **7**, 6, 9, 7)
12 July	Fernanda Herrera & Fernando Bertona	«Break Free» (Ariana Grande feat. Zedd)	29 (3, **7**, 9, 5, 6)
14 July	Marta Sánchez & Joel Ledesma	«Sorry» (Justin Bieber)	29 (4, **7**, 7, 8, 3)
14 July	Favio Posca & Soledad Bayona	«Bad Blood» (Taylor Swift feat. Kendrick Lamar)	48 (10, **10**, 10, 10, 8)
14 July	Fernando Vázquez & Estefanía Pais	«Can't Feel My Face» (The Weeknd)	38 (6, **9**, 8, 10, 5)
15 July	Oscar Ruggeri & Candela Ruggeri	«Don't Wake Me Up» (Chris Brown)	29 (3, **6**, 7, 8, 5)

Red numbers indicate the lowest score
Green numbers indicate the highest score

Sentenced: ~~Fabián Doman & Bárbara Reali (27)~~, Pamela Sosa & Alejandro Gallego (27), Ezequiel Cwirkaluk & Bárbara Silenzi (29), Fernanda Herrera & Fernando Bertona (29), Iliana Calabró & Fernando Castro (29), Marta Sánchez & Joel Ledesma (29), Oscar Ruggeri & Candela Ruggeri (29), Evander Holyfield & Judith Kovalovsky (33), Fernando Carrillo & Camila Méndez Ribeiro (33), Miriam Bora & Iván Anríquez (33) and Sabrina Rojas & Cristián Ponce (33)
Saved by the judges: Iliana Calabró & Fernando Castro, Ezequiel Cwirkaluk & Bárbara Silenzi, Fernando Carrillo & Camila Méndez Ribeiro, Sabrina Rojas & Cristián Ponce, Marta Sánchez & Joel Ledesma, Miriam Bora & Iván Anríquez, Pamela Sosa & Alejandro Gallego and Oscar Ruggeri & Candela Ruggeri
Saved by the public: Fernanda Herrera & Fernando Bertona (51.52%)
Eliminated: Evander Holyfield & Judith Kovalovsky (48.48%)
Withdrew: Fabián Doman & Bárbara Reali

=== Round 4: Trio salsa ===
Running order

Song and scores
Date	Couple	Trio Dance Partner	Song	Scores
18 July	Pedro Alfonso & Nina Iraolagoitia (Note: Replacement for Florencia Vigna.)	Lourdes Sánchez	«I Love Salsa» (N'Klabe)	41 (7, 9, 9, **9**, 7)
19 July	Diego Maradona, Jr. & Yamila Ramírez	Luciano Giugno	«Lo malo se va bailando» (Alex Matos)	34 (3, 9, 9, **9**, 4)
19 July	Osvaldo Laport & Macarena Rinaldi	Carlos Belloso	«Bailando» (Amilcar Suárez y su Salsa Matriz feat. Alejandro Jesús)	42 (7, 8, 10, **10**, 7)
21 July	Ernestina Pais & Marcos Beierbach	Marcos Gómez	«Bemba colorá» (Raquel Zozaya)	36 (6, 8, (Note: Replaced by Nacha Guevara.) 7, **9**, 6)
21 July	Favio Posca & Maia Roldán (Note: Replacement for Soledad Bayona.)	Mariela Anchipi	«Magdalena, mi amor» (Dark Latin Groove feat. Ivy Queen)	39 (6, 8, 7, **10**, 8)
21 July	Martín Liberman & Georgina Tirotta (Note: Replacement for Marcela Greco.)	Alina Moine (Note: In the duel, was replaced by Celeste Muriega.)	«Quiero salsa» (José Alberto "El Canario")	33 (5, 6, 6, **9**, 7)
22 July	Federico Bal & Laura Fernández	Lissa Vera	«La Gozadera» (Gente de Zona feat. Marc Anthony)	44 (10, 9, 8, **10**, 7)
22 July	María del Cerro & Nicolás Villalba	Candela Vetrano	«La salsa la traigo yo» (Sonora Carruseles)	37 (9, 6, 8, **9**, 5)
22 July	Fernando Carrillo & Camila Méndez Ribeiro	Mariana Brey	«Salsa con coco» (Pochy y su Cocoband)	33 (5, 6, 9, **7**, 6)
25 July	Iliana Calabró & Fernando Castro	Fátima Flórez	«Vengo caliente» (Sonora Carruseles)	42 (8, 8, 10, **8**, 8)
25 July	Agustín Casanova & Josefina Oriozabala	Fernando Dente	«El animal» (Gente de Zona)	33 (4, 9, 8, **9**, 3)
26 July	Fernanda Herrera & Fernando Bertona	Fernando Burlando	«Acuyuyé» (Dark Latin Groove)	29 (4, 9, 9, **7**, 0)
26 July	Ángela Torres & Facundo Insúa	Victorio D'Alessandro	«Salsa y sabor» (Tito Puente)	29 (5, 7, 6, **8**, 3)
28 July	Charlotte Caniggia & Juan Leandro Nimo	Francisco Delgado	«Danza Kuduro» (Don Omar & Javary ElCiklón)	41 (7, 9, 9, **9**, 7)
28 July	Ezequiel Cwirkaluk & Bárbara Silenzi	Ailén Bechara	«Tu carrito» (Carlos Oliva y Los Sobrinos del Juez)	37 (5, 10, 7, **9**, 6)
29 July	Fernando Vázquez & Estefanía Pais	Cinthia Fernández	«Usted» (Mickey Taveras feat. Álvaro Ricardo & Diego Torres)	36 (5, 8, 8, **10**, 5)
29 July	Miriam Bora & Iván Anríquez	Tamara Pettinato	«La rumba buena» (Orquesta La 33)	33 (4, 8, 8, **7**, 6)
29 July	Oscar Ruggeri & Candela Ruggeri	Esteban Fuertes	«Vivir mi vida» (Marc Anthony)	47 (10, 9, 10, **10**, 8)
1 August	Marta Sánchez & Joel Ledesma (Note: Sent to the telephone vote for not presenting to the duel.)	Jorge Moliniers	«Yo viviré» (Gloria Gaynor)	33 (5, 9, 7, **9**, 3)
1 August	Sabrina Rojas & Cristián Ponce	Carla Conte	«La última noche» (Revolución Salsera)	33 (5, 8, 7, **8**, 5)
1 August	Pamela Sosa & Alejandro Gallego	Roberto Peña	«Mi tierra» (Gloria Estefan)	26 (2, 7, 8, **6**, 3)

Red numbers indicate the lowest score
Green numbers indicate the highest score

Sentenced: Pamela Sosa & Alejandro Gallego (26), Ángela Torres & Facundo Insúa (29), Fernanda Herrera & Fernando Bertona (29), Agustín Casanova & Josefina Oriozabala (33), Fernando Carrillo & Camila Méndez Ribeiro (33), Marta Sánchez & Joel Ledesma (33), Martín Liberman & Georgina Tirotta (33), Miriam Bora & Iván Anríquez (33) and Sabrina Rojas & Cristián Ponce (33)
Saved by the judges: Agustín Casanova & Josefina Oriozabala, Ángela Torres & Facundo Insúa, Sabrina Rojas & Cristián Ponce, Martín Liberman & Georgina Tirotta, Miriam Bora & Iván Anríquez, Fernando Carrillo & Camila Méndez Ribeiro and Fernanda Herrera & Fernando Bertona
Saved by the public: Marta Sánchez & Joel Ledesma (50.06%)
Eliminated: Pamela Sosa & Alejandro Gallego (49.94%)

=== Round 5: Folklore ===
Running order

Song and scores
Date	Couple	Song	Scores
4 August	Federico Bal & Laura Fernández	«La refranera» (El Chaqueño Palavecino)	42 (6, 9, **10**, 10, 7)
5 August	Martín Liberman & Georgina Tirotta (Note: Replacement for Marcela Greco.)	«Chaco escondido» (El Chaqueño Palavecino)	37 (4, 10, **8**, 8, 7)
5 August	María del Cerro & Nicolás Villalba	«La sin corazón» (El Chaqueño Palavecino)	43 (10, 8, **9**, 8, 8)
8 August	Pedro Alfonso & Nina Iraolagoitia (Note: Replacement for Florencia Vigna.)	«Envuelto en llamas» (El Chaqueño Palavecino)	44 (10, 10, **9**, 10, 5)
8 August	Ernestina Pais & Marcos Beierbach	«Déjame que me vaya» (El Chaqueño Palavecino)	45 (9, 10, **9**, 10, 8)
9 August	Iliana Calabró & Fernando Castro	«Entre a mi pago sin golpear» (Soledad Pastorutti)	28 (4, 7, **6**, 7, 4)
9 August	Favio Posca & Soledad Bayona	«El humahuaqueño» (Los Tekis)	43 (5, 10, **10**, 10, 8)
9 August	Ezequiel Cwirkaluk & Bárbara Silenzi	«La taba» (Los Nocheros)	42 (10, 9, **9**, 8, 6)
11 August	Osvaldo Laport & Macarena Rinaldi	«Al jardín de la república» (Los Guaraníes)	45 (9, 9, **9**, 10, 8)
11 August	Agustín Casanova & Josefina Oriozabala	«Cuando me dices que no» (Los Nocheros)	44 (9, 10, **10**, 9, 6)
12 August	Charlotte Caniggia & Juan Leandro Nimo	«A don Ata» (Soledad Pastorutti feat. Natalia Pastorutti)	33 (10, 6, **7**, 6, 4)
12 August	Oscar Ruggeri & Candela Ruggeri	«Kilómetro 11» (Los Alonsitos)	35 (7, 8, **8**, 7, 5)
12 August	Fernando Vázquez & Estefanía Pais	«Chakai Manta» (Los Nocheros)	46 (9, 10, **10**, 10, 7)
15 August	Fernanda Herrera & Fernando Bertona	«Chacarera del olvido» (El Chaqueño Palavecino)	33 (5, 7, **7**, 8, 6)
15 August	Miriam Bora & Iván Anríquez	«Troja de amor» (El Chaqueño Palavecino)	28 (0, 10, **6**, 8, 4)
16 August	Ángela Torres & Facundo Insúa (Note: Sent directly to the telephone vote after not being able to dance her choreography in the duel.)	She did not dance due to an injury.	
16 August	Diego Maradona Jr. & Yamila Ramírez	«La yapa» (Los Nocheros)	28 (4, 7, **5**, 8, 4)
16 August	Sabrina Rojas & Cristián Ponce	«La baguala» (Abel Pintos)	45 (10, 8, **10**, 10, 7)
16 August	Fernando Carrillo & Camila Méndez Ribeiro	«Chacarera de un triste» (Soledad Pastorutti)	38 (7, 8, **8**, 9, 6)
18 August	Marta Sánchez & Joel Ledesma	Her did not show up to dance.	

Red numbers indicate the lowest score
Green numbers indicate the highest score

Sentenced: Ángela Torres & Facundo Insúa (—), Iliana Calabró & Fernando Castro (28), Miriam Bora & Iván Anríquez (28), Diego Maradona, Jr. & Yamila Ramírez (28), Charlotte Caniggia & Juan Leandro Nimo (28), Oscar Ruggeri & Candela Ruggeri (33) and Fernanda Herrera & Fernando Bertona (33)
Saved by the judges: Iliana Calabró & Fernando Castro, Oscar Ruggeri & Candela Ruggeri, Charlotte Caniggia & Juan Leandro Nimo, Fernanda Herrera & Fernando Bertona and Diego Maradona, Jr. & Yamila Ramírez
Saved by the public: Ángela Torres & Facundo Insúa (67.15%)
Eliminated: Miriam Bora & Iván Anríquez (32.85%)
Disqualified: Marta Sánchez & Joel Ledesma

=== Round 6: Cuarteto ===
Running order

Song and scores
Date	Couple	Song	Scores
19 August	Charlotte Caniggia & Juan Leandro Nimo	«El bum bum» (La Mona Jiménez)	33 (7, 8, (Note: Replaced by Nacha Guevara.) 7, **6**, 5)
19 August	Ernestina Pais & Marcos Beierbach	«Como olvidarla» (Rodrigo)	38 (4, 7, 10, **10**, 7)
19 August	María del Cerro & Nicolás Villalba	«Hay algo en ella» (Tru-la-lá)	40 (9, 6, 8, **10**, 7)
19 August	Ezequiel Cwirkaluk & Bárbara Silenzi	«Fuego y pasión» (Rodrigo)	30 (4, 6, 7, **8**, 5)
22 August	Federico Bal & Laura Fernández	«Qué ironía» (Rodrigo)	45 (10, 10, 10, **10**, 5)
22 August	Favio Posca & Soledad Bayona	«Fue lo mejor del amor» (Rodrigo)	40 (4, 9, 9, **10**, 8)
23 August	Osvaldo Laport & Macarena Rinaldi	«Llegó tu papi» (Jean Carlos)	46 (10, 10, 9, **10**, 7)
23 August	Sabrina Rojas & Cristián Ponce	«Amor clasificado» (Rodrigo)	48 (10, 10, 10, **10**, 8)
23 August	Martín Liberman & Georgina Tirotta (Note: Replacement for Marcela Greco.)	«Cuando Me Enamoro» (Banda XXI)	17 (1, 7, 6, —, (Note: He withdrew from the competition before the end of the round, therefore his secret vote was not disclosed.) 3)
25 August	Diego Maradona, Jr. & Yamila Ramírez	«Soy cordobés» (Rodrigo)	39 (8, 8, 7, **10**, 6)
25 August	Pedro Alfonso & Florencia Vigna	«Hace calor» (Tru-la-lá)	48 (10, 10, 10, **10**, 8)
25 August	Fernando Vázquez & Estefanía Pais	«Por lo que yo te quiero» (Walter Olmos)	44 (10, 9, 9, **9**, 7)
26 August	Iliana Calabró & Fernando Castro	«Beso a beso» (La Mona Jiménez)	34 (7, 7, 7, **8**, 5)
26 August	Oscar Ruggeri & Candela Ruggeri	«El agite» (La Mona Jiménez)	30 (5, 7, 7, **8**, 3)
26 August	Fernanda Herrera & Fernando Bertona	«Amor fugitivo» (Walter Olmos)	44 (8, 9, 10, **9**, 8)
29 August	Ángela Torres & Facundo Insúa	«Soy un adicto a ti» (Walter Olmos)	42 (8, 10, 8, **10**, 6)
30 August	Agustín Casanova & Josefina Oriozabala	«Como le digo» (Rodrigo)	43 (6, 10, 10, **9**, 8)
30 August	Fernando Carrillo & Camila Méndez Ribeiro	«Déjame llorar» (Banda XXI)	34 (7, 7, 9, **8**, 3)

Red numbers indicate the lowest score
Green numbers indicate the highest score

Sentenced: Ezequiel Cwirkaluk & Bárbara Silenzi (30), Oscar Ruggeri & Candela Ruggeri (30), Charlotte Caniggia & Juan Leandro Nimo (33), Iliana Calabró & Fernando Castro (34) and Fernando Carrillo & Camila Méndez Ribeiro (34)
Saved by the judges: Iliana Calabró & Fernando Castro, Ezequiel Cwirkaluk & Bárbara Silenzi and Charlotte Caniggia & Juan Leandro Nimo
Saved by the public: Oscar Ruggeri & Candela Ruggeri (55.61%)
Eliminated: Fernando Carrillo & Camila Méndez Ribeiro (44.39%)
Withdrew: Martín Liberman & Georgina Tirotta/Marcela Greco

=== Round 7: Reggaetón ===
Running order

Song and scores
Date	Couple	Song	Scores
1 September	Fernanda Herrera & Fernando Bertona	«La Temperatura» (Maluma feat. Eli Palacios)	18 (3, 5, **5**, 5, 0)
1 September	Sabrina Rojas & Cristián Ponce	«Drop It on Me» (Ricky Martin feat. Daddy Yankee)	23 (3, 5, **6**, 6, 3)
2 September	Federico Bal & Laura Fernández	«Ginza» (J Balvin)	47 (10, 10, **9**, 10, 8)
2 September	Osvaldo Laport & Macarena Rinaldi	«Desde Esa Noche» (Thalía feat. Maluma)	34 (4, 8, **10**, 9, 3)
2 September	María del Cerro & Nicolás Villalba	«Muévela» (Angel & Khriz)	30 (6, 5, **6**, 9, 4)
5 September	Pedro Alfonso & Florencia Vigna	«Perros salvajes» (Daddy Yankee)	37 (7, 8, **9**, 10, 3)
5 September	Ángela Torres & Facundo Insúa	«El ritmo no perdona» (Daddy Yankee)	37 (10, 5, **9**, 10, 3)
5 September	Fernando Vázquez & Estefanía Pais	«Plakito» (Yandel feat. Gadiel)	40 (9, 8, **9**, 9, 5)
6 September	Agustín Casanova & Josefina Oriozabala	«Me Estás Tentando» (Wisin & Yandel)	42 (9, 8, **10**, 10, 5)
6 September	Oscar Ruggeri & Candela Ruggeri	«Picky» (Joey Montana)	27 (2, 5, **10**, 10, 0)
6 September	Favio Posca & Soledad Bayona	«Calentura» (Yandel)	45 (9, 9, **10**, 10, 7)
8 September	Charlotte Caniggia & Juan Leandro Nimo	«El taxi» (Pitbull feat. Sensato and Osmani García)	18 (3, 4, **6**, 4, 1)
8 September	Diego Maradona Jr. & Yamila Ramírez	«Rompe» (Daddy Yankee)	27 (4, 5, **9**, 9, 0)
8 September	Iliana Calabró & Fernando Castro	«Baile de los pobres» (Calle 13)	42 (6, 10, **9**, 9, 8)
9 September	Ezequiel Cwirkaluk & Bárbara Silenzi	«Shaky Shaky» (Daddy Yankee)	47 (10, 10, **9**, 10, 8)
9 September	Ernestina Pais & Marcos Beierbach	«Ahora es» (Wisin & Yandel)	27 (5, 5, **7**, 7, 3)

Red numbers indicate the lowest score
Green numbers indicate the highest score

Sentenced: Charlotte Caniggia & Juan Leandro Nimo (18), Fernanda Herrera & Fernando Bertona (18), Sabrina Rojas & Cristián Ponce (23), Diego Maradona, Jr. & Yamila Ramírez (27), Ernestina Pais & Marcos Beierbach (27) and Oscar Ruggeri & Candela Ruggeri (27)
Saved by the judges: Sabrina Rojas & Cristián Ponce, Fernanda Herrera & Fernando Bertona, Diego Maradona, Jr. & Yamila Ramírez and Charlotte Caniggia & Juan Leandro Nimo
Saved by the public: Oscar Ruggeri & Candela Ruggeri (51.21%)
Eliminated: Ernestina Pais & Marcos Beierbach (48.79%)

=== Round 8: Free Style ===
Running order

Song and scores
Date	Couple	Thematic	Song	Scores
12 September	Federico Bal & Laura Fernández	Ups and downs of the profession	«Numb» (Usher)	32 (5, 8, 8, **8**, 3)
12 September	Fernando Vázquez & Estefanía Pais	The Avenger	«Revolt» (Nathan Lanier) «Gangsta's Paradise» (Coolio feat. L.V.)	23 (5, 7, 8, —, (Note: He withdrew from the competition before the end of the round, therefore his secret vote was not disclosed.) 3)
13 September	Agustín Casanova & Josefina Oriozabala	Lyrical jazz	«Fix You» (Coldplay)	42 (10, 9, 10, **9**, 4)
13 September	Ezequiel Cwirkaluk & Bárbara Silenzi	Mash-Up Retro	«Pump Up the Jam» (Technotronic) «Ice Ice Baby» (Vanilla Ice) «U Can't Touch This» (MC Hammer)	46 (10, 9, 10, **10**, 7)
13 September	Favio Posca & Soledad Bayona	In search of the sun (African dance)	«Chango (Inle-Gue)» (Latin Xpress feat. Gina Martin)	46 (8, 10, 10, **10**, 8)
15 September	Pedro Alfonso & Florencia Vigna	The end that is not the end	«Nightmare» (Brainbug) «Único» (Lali Espósito)	41 (5, 10, 10, **10**, 6)
15 September	Osvaldo Laport & Macarena Rinaldi	Our love broke (Flamenco & Contemporary)	«Se nos rompió el amor» (Rocío Jurado)	25 (2, 7, 7, **9**, 0)
15 September	Sabrina Rojas & Cristián Ponce	Argentinian Divas: Tribute to Susana Giménez & Moria Casán	«Good Times» (Chic) «Sweet Dreams» (Eurythmics) «Superwoman» (Alicia Keys)	32 (5, 7, 10, **6**, 4)
15 September	María del Cerro & Nicolás Villalba	Hysteria	«I Want to Hold Your Hand» / «All My Loving» / «Come Together» (The Beatles)	48 (10, 10, 10, **10**, 8)
16 September	Charlotte Caniggia & Juan Leandro Nimo	My dad is an idol: Tribute to Claudio Caniggia and Mariana Nannis	«Un'estate italiana» (Edoardo Bennato feat. Gianna Nannini)	27 (2, 7, 6, **7**, 5)
16 September	Fernanda Herrera & Fernando Bertona	Come to dance	«On the Floor» (Jennifer Lopez feat. Pitbull)	32 (0, 7, 10, **5**, 10)
16 September	Iliana Calabró & Fernando Castro	Tribute to Juan Carlos Calabró	«Pendeviejo» (Los Auténticos Decadentes) «Estás para ganar» / «La barra de la coneja» / «Pelotazo en contra» / «Johny Tolengo» (Johny Tolengo)	50 (10, 10, 10, **10**, 10)
19 September	Oscar Ruggeri & Candela Ruggeri	Our history (Inspired by Pinocchio)	«It's Oh So Quiet» (Björk) «Aquellas pequeñas cosas» (Joan Manuel Serrat)	42 (10, 7, 10, **7**, 8)
19 September	Diego Maradona Jr. & Yamila Ramírez	Love in Nápoles	«Un'altra te (Otra como tú)» (Eros Ramazzotti) «Mambo Italiano» (Rosemary Clooney) «Volare» (Gipsy Kings)	32 (7, 8, 7, **8**, 2)
20 September	Ángela Torres & Facundo Insúa	Symphony of cats	«Feeling Good» (Michael Bublé) «Soda Pop» (Robbie Williams feat. Michael Bublé) «A Little Party Never Killed Nobody» (Fergie feat. Q-Tip & GoonRock)	48 (10, 10, 10, **10**, 8)

Red numbers indicate the lowest score
Green numbers indicate the highest score

Sentenced: Osvaldo Laport & Macarena Rinaldi (25), Charlotte Caniggia & Juan Leandro Nimo (27), Diego Maradona, Jr. & Yamila Ramírez (32), Federico Bal & Laura Fernández (32), Fernanda Herrera & Fernando Bertona (32) and Sabrina Rojas & Cristián Ponce (32)
Saved by the judges: Diego Maradona, Jr. & Yamila Ramírez, Federico Bal & Laura Fernández, Osvaldo Laport & Macarena Rinaldi and Sabrina Rojas & Cristián Ponce
Saved by the public: Charlotte Caniggia & Juan Leandro Nimo (74.30%)
Eliminated: Fernanda Herrera & Fernando Bertona (25.70%)
Withdrew: Fernando Vázquez & Estefanía Pais

=== Round 9: Bachata ===
Running order

Song and scores
Date	Couple	Song	Scores
22 September	Pedro Alfonso & Florencia Vigna	«Te robaré» (Prince Royce)	32 (7, 8, **7**, 7, (Note: Replaced by Graciela Alfano.) 3)
22 September	Diego Maradona Jr. & Yamila Ramírez	«Te Perdiste Mi Amor» (Thalía feat. Prince Royce)	32 (5, 7, **8**, 9, 3)
22 September	Sabrina Rojas & Cristián Ponce	«Te extraño» (Xtreme)	41 (10, 9, **10**, 5, 7)
22 September	María del Cerro & Nicolás Villalba	«When I Was Your Man» (Dzerej)	44 (9, 9, **8**, 10, 8)
23 September	Federico Bal & Laura Fernández	«Get Lucky» (Willy William & LJ)	28 (4, 6, **6**, 9, 3)
23 September	Charlotte Caniggia & Juan Leandro Nimo	«Be My Baby» (Leslie Grace)	28 (5, 6, **7**, 7, 3)
23 September	Oscar Ruggeri & Candela Ruggeri	«Se desesperaba (El carrito azul)» (Ricardo Montaner)	34 (4, 10, **7**, 8, 5)
23 September	Favio Posca & Soledad Bayona	«Propuesta Indecente» (Romeo Santos)	45 (7, 10, **10**, 10, 8)
26 September	Lizy Tagliani & Carlos Bernal	«Cuando Me Enamoro» (Enrique Iglesias feat. Juan Luis Guerra)	43 (9, 10, **9**, 8, 7)
26 September	Bárbara Vélez & Maximiliano Buitrago	«Killing Me Softly with His Song» (Rebecca Kingsley feat. Wyclef Jean)	46 (10, 10, **9**, 10, 7)
26 September	Ezequiel Cwirkaluk & Bárbara Silenzi	«Corazón Sin Cara» (Prince Royce)	31 (5, 8, **7**, 8, 3)
26 September	Iliana Calabró & Fernando Castro	«Aventura» (Abel Pintos)	39 (7, 8, **9**, 8, 7)
27 September	Anita Martínez & Marcos Gómez	«Que bonito» (Vicky Corbacho)	44 (10, 8, **9**, 10, 7)
27 September	Ángela Torres & Facundo Insúa	«Amigo» (Romeo Santos)	40 (8, 9, **7**, 9, 7)
27 September	Nicole Neumann & Jorge Moliniers	«Darte un beso» (Prince Royce)	50 (10, 10, **10**, 10, 10)
29 September	Agustín Casanova & Josefina Oriozabala	Did not dance. Him withdrew from the competition.	
29 September	Osvaldo Laport & Macarena Rinaldi	«Stand by Me» (Prince Royce)	43 (6, 10, **9**, 10, 8)
29 September	Carla Conte & Marcos Beierbach	«Incondicional» (Prince Royce)	42 (9, 8, **9**, 9, 7)

Red numbers indicate the lowest score
Green numbers indicate the highest score

Sentenced: Charlotte Caniggia & Juan Leandro Nimo (28), Federico Bal & Laura Fernández (28), Ezequiel Cwirkaluk & Bárbara Silenzi (31), Diego Maradona, Jr. & Yamila Ramírez (32) and Pedro Alfonso & Florencia Vigna (32)
Saved by the judges: Pedro Alfonso & Florencia Vigna, Federico Bal & Laura Fernández and Ezequiel Cwirkaluk & Bárbara Silenzi
Saved by the public: Charlotte Caniggia & Juan Leandro Nimo (54.81%)
Eliminated: Diego Maradona, Jr. & Yamila Ramírez (45.19%)
Withdrew: Agustín Casanova & Josefina Oriozabala

=== Round 10: Rock and Roll ===
Running order

Song and scores
Date	Couple	Song	Scores
30 September	Federico Bal & Laura Fernández	«Vicio» (Ratones Paranoicos)	48 (**10**, 10, 10, (Note: Replaced by María Vázquez.) 10, 8)
30 September	Oscar Ruggeri & Candela Ruggeri	«Travelin' Band» (Creedence Clearwater Revival)	42 (**9**, 9, 8, 9, 7)
30 September	Sabrina Rojas & Cristián Ponce	«(She's) Sexy + 17» (Stray Cats)	42 (**8**, 10, 9, 10, 5)
30 September	María del Cerro & Nicolás Villalba	«Crazy Little Thing Called Love» (Queen)	47 (**10**, 10, 10, 10, 7)
3 October	Charlotte Caniggia & Juan Leandro Nimo	«I Saw Her Standing There» (Glee Cast)	38 (**7**, 8, 7, 10, 6)
3 October	Lizy Tagliani & Carlos Bernal	«Great Balls of Fire» (Jerry Lee Lewis)	34 (**9**, 8, 7, 10, 6)
3 October	Ezequiel Cwirkaluk & Bárbara Silenzi	«Hound Dog» (Tom Jones)	28 (**3**, 6, 8, 8, 3)
4 October	Anita Martínez & Marcos Gómez (Note: Sent to the telephone duel by not being able to finish their choreography in the duel.)	«La plaga» (Parchis)	34 (**7**, 7, 9, 7, 3)
4 October	Nicole Neumann & Jorge Moliniers	«Long Tall Sally» (Little Richard)	34 (**9**, 7, 7, 8, 3)
4 October	Favio Posca & Soledad Bayona	«(I Can't Get No) Satisfaction» (The Rolling Stones)	42 (**4**, 10, 10, 10, 8)
6 October	Pedro Alfonso & Florencia Vigna	«Mi perro Dinamita» (Patricio Rey y sus Redonditos de Ricota)	44 (**9**, 10, 10, 10, 5)
6 October	Bárbara Vélez & Maximiliano Buitrago	«Footloose» (Blake Shelton)	35 (**8**, 7, 8, 8, 4)
6 October	Iliana Calabró & Fernando Castro	«Blue Suede Shoes» (Elvis Presley)	48 (**8**, 10, 10, 10, 10)
6 October	Osvaldo Laport & Macarena Rinaldi	«Rock and Roll Music» (The Beatles)	37 (**7**, 7, 9, 9, 5)
7 October	Ángela Torres & Facundo Insúa	«Proud Mary» (Glee Cast)	42 (**9**, 9, 9, 9, 6)
7 October	Carla Conte & Marcos Beierbach	«Cruisin' for a Bruisin'» (Teen Beach Movie)	30 (**4**, 6, 9, 9, 2)

Red numbers indicate the lowest score
Green numbers indicate the highest score

Sentenced: Ezequiel Cwirkaluk & Bárbara Silenzi (28), Carla Conte & Marcos Beierbach (30), Anita Martínez & Marcos Gómez (34), Lizy Tagliani & Carlos Bernal (34) and Nicole Neumann & Jorge Moliniers (34)
Saved by the judges: Carla Conte & Marcos Beierbach, Nicole Neumann & Jorge Moliniers and Ezequiel Cwirkaluk & Bárbara Silenzi
Saved by the public: Anita Martínez & Marcos Gómez (54.81%)
Eliminated: Lizy Tagliani & Carlos Bernal (45.19%)

=== Round 11: Synchro dance ===
Running order

Song and scores
Date	Couple	Song	Scores
10 October	Federico Bal & Laura Fernández	«Whine» (Putzgrilla feat. Supa Squad & Ce'cile)	47 (10, **9**, 10, 10, 8)
10 October	Ángela Torres & Facundo Insúa	«This Is How We Do» (Katy Perry)	40 (8, **9**, 8, 9, 6)
10 October	Ezequiel Cwirkaluk & Bárbara Silenzi	«Animals» (Martin Garrix)	44 (5, **10**, 10, 10, 9)
10 October	Oscar Ruggeri & Candela Ruggeri	«I Can Only Imagine» (David Guetta)	36 (7, **8**, 7, 8, 6)
11 October	Pedro Alfonso & Florencia Vigna	«How Deep Is Your Love» (Calvin Harris & Disciples)	43 (7, **10**, 7, 10, 9)
11 October	Nicole Neumann & Jorge Moliniers	«Runaway (U & I)» (Galantis)	40 (10, **7**, 7, 8, 8)
11 October	Iliana Calabró & Fernando Castro	«Rather Be» (Clean Bandit feat. Jess Glynne)	33 (8, **5**, 7, 8, 5)
11 October	Osvaldo Laport & Macarena Rinaldi	«I'm an Albatraoz» (AronChupa)	30 (4, **10**, 5, 7, 4)
13 October	Charlotte Caniggia & Juan Leandro Nimo	«Addicted to You» (Avicii)	9 (0, **5**, 1, 3, 0)
13 October	Anita Martínez & Marcos Gómez	«Moves like Jagger» (Maroon 5 feat. Christina Aguilera)	33 (4, **6**, 5, 8, 10)
13 October	Sabrina Rojas & Cristián Ponce	«Sexy Bitch» (David Guetta)	37 (6, **8**, 8, 9, 6)
13 October	María del Cerro & Nicolás Villalba	«This Is What You Came For» (Calvin Harris feat. Rihanna)	45 (9, **9**, 9, 10, 8)
14 October	Bárbara Vélez & Maximiliano Buitrago	«This Is What It Feels Like» (Armin van Buuren)	42 (8, **9**, 10, 8, 7)
14 October	Carla Conte & Marcos Beierbach	«I Need Your Love» (Calvin Harris feat. Ellie Goulding)	41 (8, **9**, 8, 9, 7)
14 October	Favio Posca & Soledad Bayona	«Party Rock Anthem» (LMFAO feat. Lauren Bennett & GoonRock)	38 (7, **10**, 9, 8, 4)

Red numbers indicate the lowest score
Green numbers indicate the highest score

Sentenced: Charlotte Caniggia & Juan Leandro Nimo (9), Osvaldo Laport & Macarena Rinaldi (30), Anita Martínez & Marcos Gómez (33) and Iliana Calabró & Fernando Castro (33)
Saved by the judges: Iliana Calabró & Fernando Castro and Anita Martínez & Marcos Gómez
Saved by the public: Charlotte Caniggia & Juan Leandro Nimo (55.62%)
Eliminated: Osvaldo Laport & Macarena Rinaldi (44.38%)

=== Round 12: Tango or Milonga ===
Running order

Song and scores
Date	Couple	Dance	Song	Scores
17 October	Federico Bal & Laura Fernández	Tango	«Libertango» (Astor Piazzolla)	36 (6, 8, **9**, 9, 4)
17 October	Ezequiel Cwirkaluk & Bárbara Silenzi	Milonga	«La puñalada» (Juan d'Arienzo)	36 (4, 8, **9**, 8, 7)
17 October	Oscar Ruggeri & Candela Ruggeri	Milonga	«El firulete» (Mariano Mores)	30 (6, 6, **6**, 8, 5)
18 October	Charlotte Caniggia & Juan Leandro Nimo	Milonga	«Se dice de mí» (Tita Merello)	40 (10, 8, **9**, 8, 7)
18 October	Sabrina Rojas & Cristián Ponce	Tango	«Danzarín» (Julián Plaza)	43 (8, 7, **10**, 10, 8)
20 October	Ángela Torres & Facundo Insúa	Tango	«Tanguera» (Mariano Mores)	37 (8, 7, **7**, 10, 5)
20 October	Nicole Neumann & Jorge Moliniers	Tango	«La cumparsita» (Gerardo Matos Rodríguez)	39 (7, 7, **8**, 10, 7)
20 October	María del Cerro & Nicolás Villalba	Tango	«Canaro en París» (Juan Caldarella & Alejandro Scarpino)	46 (10, 8, **10**, 10, 8)
21 October	Pedro Alfonso & Florencia Vigna	Tango	«Tinta roja» (Sebastián Piana & Cátulo Castillo)	45 (8, 10, **10**, 10, 7)
21 October	Bárbara Vélez & Maximiliano Buitrago	Milonga	«Milonga sentimental» (Sebastián Piana & Homero Manzi)	37 (5, 7, **10**, 7, 8)
21 October	Carla Conte & Marcos Beierbach	Tango	«Naranjo en flor» (Homero Expósito & Virgilio Expósito)	42 (6, 10, **7**, 10, 9)
21 October	Favio Posca & Soledad Bayona	Tango	«Cambalache» (Enrique Santos Discépolo)	42 (5, 10, **9**, 10, 8)
24 October	Anita Martínez & Marcos Gómez	Milonga	«Azúcar, pimienta y sal» (Héctor Varela, Ernesto Rossi & Abel Aznar)	30 (3, 6, **9**, 8, 4)
24 October	Iliana Calabró & Fernando Castro	Tango	«Quejas de bandoneón» (Juan de Dios Filiberto)	43 (9, 8, **10**, 9, 7)

Red numbers indicate the lowest score
Green numbers indicate the highest score

Sentenced: Anita Martínez & Marcos Gómez (30), Oscar Ruggeri & Candela Ruggeri (30), Ezequiel Cwirkaluk & Bárbara Silenzi (36), Federico Bal & Laura Fernández (36), Ángela Torres & Facundo Insúa (37) and Bárbara Vélez & Maximiliano Buitrago (37)
Saved by the judges: Ezequiel Cwirkaluk & Bárbara Silenzi, Bárbara Vélez & Maximiliano Buitrago, Federico Bal & Laura Fernández and Oscar Ruggeri & Candela Ruggeri
Saved by the public: Ángela Torres & Facundo Insúa (54.47%)
Eliminated: Anita Martínez & Marcos Gómez (45.53%)

=== Round 13: Tributes ===
Running order

Song and scores
Date	Couple	Tribute	Song	Scores
25 October	Federico Bal & Laura Fernández	John Travolta	«Hot Stuff» (Donna Summer) «You Never Can Tell» (Chuck Berry) «You're the One That I Want» (John Travolta & Olivia Newton-John)	44 (10, 10, 9, **8**, 7)
25 October	Nicole Neumann & Jorge Moliniers	Marilyn Monroe	«Medley: When Love Goes Wrong, Nothing Goes Right/Heat Wave» (Michelle Williams) «I Wanna Be Loved by You» / «My Heart Belongs to Daddy» / «Happy Birthday, Mr. President» / «Diamonds Are a Girl's Best Friend» (Marilyn Monroe)	33 (5, 9, 7, **7**, 5)
25 October	Carla Conte & Marcos Beierbach	Argentine rock	«En la Ciudad de la Furia» (Soda Stereo) «La flor más bella» (Memphis La Blusera) «Matador» (Los Fabulosos Cadillacs) «Juntos a la par» (Pappo) «Muchacha (Ojos de papel)» (Almendra) «No llores por mí, Argentina» (Serú Girán) «El amor es más fuerte» (Ulises Butrón)	29 (4, 5, 6, **10**, 4)
27 October	Charlotte Caniggia & Juan Leandro Nimo	Gilda	«Se me ha perdido un corazón (Acoustic version)» (Natalia Oreiro) «No me arrepiento de este amor» / «Fuiste» / «Paisaje» (Gilda)	26 (4, 6, (Note: Replaced by Nacha Guevara.) 6, **6**, 4)
27 October	María del Cerro & Nicolás Villalba	Cris Morena	«Juntos» (Jugate conmigo) «Chufacha» (Chiquititas) «Bonita de Más» (Erreway) «Corazones al viento» (Florencia Bertotti) «Que nos volvamos a ver» (Teen Angels) «Volar mejor» (Romina Yan)	48 (10, 9, 9, **10**, 10)
27 October	Oscar Ruggeri & Candela Ruggeri	Cacho Castaña	«Café, la humedad» / «Garganta con arena» / «La gata Varela» / «Cacho de Buenos Aires» (Cacho Castaña)	40 (7, 8, 10, **8**, 7)
28 October	Pedro Alfonso & Florencia Vigna	María Elena Walsh	«En el país de Nomeacuerdo» / «El reino del revés» / «El twist del mono liso» / «El brujito de Gulubú» / «Canción del jacarandá» / «Como la cigarra» (María Elena Walsh)	38 (7, 7, 9, **10**, 5)
28 October	Ángela Torres & Facundo Insúa	Lolita Torres	«Bendita mi raza» / «A París» / «No me mires más» / «Primer amor» (Lolita Torres)	49 (10, 10, 10, **10**, 9)
28 October	Iliana Calabró & Fernando Castro	Italian immigrants	«Mi viejo el italiano» (Cacho Castaña) «Uei Paesano!» (Nicola Paone) «'O sole mio» / «Funiculì, Funiculà» (Luciano Pavarotti) «Tarantella» (Fred Rovella) «Viva la pappa col pomodoro» (Rita Pavone) «Torna a Surriento» (Jeff Stewart & Audrey Hyland) «I migliori anni della nostra vita» (Renato Zero)	37 (5, 7, 9, **9**, 7)
31 October	Bárbara Vélez & Maximiliano Buitrago	Chespirito	«Que bonita vecindad» / «Gracias por siempre» (Chespirito) «El ocho» (DJ Seven)	33 (5, 7, 10, **8**, 3)
31 October	Sabrina Rojas & Cristián Ponce	Eva Perón	«Buenos Aires» / «La nueva Argentina» / «No llores por mí, Argentina» (Evita, The Musical) «La rosa» (Vale Tango)	33 (5, 7, 10, **7**, 4)
31 October	Favio Posca & Soledad Bayona	Michael Jackson	«Billie Jean» / «Black or White» / «Earth Song» (Michael Jackson)	33 (4, 7, 7, **8**, 7)
1 November	Ezequiel Cwirkaluk & Bárbara Silenzi	Rodrigo	«De enero a enero» / «Fue lo mejor del amor» / «Un largo camino al cielo» (Rodrigo)	45 (10, 9, 9, **9**, 8)

Red numbers indicate the lowest score
Green numbers indicate the highest score

Sentenced: Charlotte Caniggia & Juan Leandro Nimo (26), Carla Conte & Marcos Beierbach (29), Bárbara Vélez & Maximiliano Buitrago (33), Favio Posca & Soledad Bayona (33), Nicole Neumann & Jorge Moliniers (33) and Sabrina Rojas & Cristián Ponce (33)
Saved by the judges: Nicole Neumann & Jorge Moliniers, Carla Conte & Marcos Beierbach, Sabrina Rojas & Cristián Ponce and Charlotte Caniggia & Juan Leandro Nimo
Saved by the public: Bárbara Vélez & Maximiliano Buitrago (51.61%)
Eliminated: Favio Posca & Soledad Bayona (48.39%)

=== Round 14: Family's Merengue ===
Running order

Song and scores
Date	Couple	Family (Relationship)	Song	Scores
3 November	Charlotte Caniggia & Juan Leandro Nimo	Alexander Caniggia (Charlotte's brother)	«Levántate» (Héctor Acosta)	32 (**4**, 8, 7, 8, 5)
3 November	Bárbara Vélez & Maximiliano Buitrago	Alejandro Pucheta (Bárbara's father)	«Mi niña bonita» (La K'onga)	27 (**4**, 8, 5, 7, 3)
3 November	Oscar Ruggeri & Candela Ruggeri	Nancy Otero (Oscar's wife and Candela's mother)	«Cuando Me Enamoro» (Banda XXI)	40 (**6**, 9, 10, 10, 5)
4 November	Pedro Alfonso & Florencia Vigna	Horacio Alfonso (Pedro's father)	«Rompecintura» (Los Hermanos Rosario)	43 (**7**, 10, 10, 10, 6)
4 November	Ángela Torres & Facundo Insúa	Pedro Maurizi (Angela's boyfriend)	«A pedir su mano» (Juan Luis Guerra)	46 (**10**, 10, 9, 10, 7)
4 November	Ezequiel Cwirkaluk & Bárbara Silenzi	Jonathan Cwirkaluk (Ezequiel's brother)	«Quiéreme» (Jean Carlos)	40 (**7**, 9, 8, 10, 6)
4 November	Sabrina Rojas & Cristián Ponce	Romina Dazza (Sabrina's domestic worker)	«Muévelo» (Jandy Ventura & Los Potros)	43 (**8**, 9, 9, 10, 7)
7 November	Federico Bal & Laura Fernández	Gabriela Fernández (Laura's sister)	«La gallera» (Juan Luis Guerra)	49 (**10**, 10, 10, 10, 9)
7 November	Nicole Neumann & Jorge Moliniers	Geraldine Neumann (Nicole's sister)	«Abusadora» (Wilfrido Vargas)	40 (**7**, 9, 7, 9, 8)
8 November	Iliana Calabró & Fernando Castro	Antonello Grandolfo (Iliana's boyfriend)	«Es mentiroso» (Olga Tañón)	40 (**7**, 6, 9, 9, 9)
8 November	María del Cerro & Nicolás Villalba	Agustín del Cerro (María's brother)	«Chica sexy» (Banda XXI)	50 (**10**, 10, 10, 10, 10)
8 November	Carla Conte & Marcos Beierbach	Analía Irrazabal (Carla's comadre)	«Esa chica tiene swing» (Banda XXI)	49 (**10**, 10, 10, 10, 9)

Red numbers indicate the lowest score
Green numbers indicate the highest score

Sentenced: Bárbara Vélez & Maximiliano Buitrago (27), Charlotte Caniggia & Juan Leandro Nimo (32), Ezequiel Cwirkaluk & Bárbara Silenzi (40), Iliana Calabró & Fernando Castro (40), Nicole Neumann & Jorge Moliniers (40) and Oscar Ruggeri & Candela Ruggeri (40)
Saved by the judges: Nicole Neumann & Jorge Moliniers, Iliana Calabró & Fernando Castro, Ezequiel Cwirkaluk & Bárbara Silenzi and Bárbara Vélez & Maximiliano Buitrago
Saved by the public: Charlotte Caniggia & Juan Leandro Nimo (55.37%)
Eliminated: Oscar Ruggeri & Candela Ruggeri (44.63%)

=== Round 15: Zumba ===
Running order

Song and scores
Date	Couple	Song	Scores
14 November	Pedro Alfonso & Florencia Vigna	«Vente pa'ca» (Ricky Martin feat. Maluma)	42 (9, **10**, 8, 9, 6)
14 November	Ángela Torres & Facundo Insúa	«Shut up and Dance» (Max Pizzolante)	44 (8, **9**, 9, 10, 8)
14 November	María del Cerro & Nicolás Villalba	«Limbo» (Daddy Yankee)	34 (7, **6**, 7, 9, 5)
15 November	Federico Bal & Laura Fernández	«Soy» (Lali Espósito)	37 (10, **8**, 7, 9, 3)
15 November	Nicole Neumann & Jorge Moliniers	«Lovumba» (Daddy Yankee)	37 (5, **6**, 8, 8, 10)
15 November	Sabrina Rojas & Cristián Ponce	«Adiós» (Ricky Martin)	30 (5, **6**, 7, 7, 5)
17 November	Charlotte Caniggia & Juan Leandro Nimo	«Live It Up» (Jennifer Lopez feat. Pitbull)	45 (10, **9**, 8, 8, 10)
17 November	Bárbara Vélez & Maximiliano Buitrago	«La Mordidita» (Ricky Martin feat. Yotuel Romero)	48 (10, **10**, 10, 8, 10)
17 November	Iliana Calabró & Fernando Castro	«Viva la Vida» (Wisin & Yandel)	30 (5, **6**, 7, 8, 4)
17 November	Carla Conte & Marcos Beierbach	«Adrenalina» (Wisin feat. Ricky Martin & Jennifer Lopez)	40 (7, **7**, 9, 10, 7)
18 November	Ezequiel Cwirkaluk & Bárbara Silenzi	«Histeria» (Lali Espósito)	30 (5, **5**, 8, 7, 5)

Red numbers indicate the lowest score
Green numbers indicate the highest score

Sentenced: Ezequiel Cwirkaluk & Bárbara Silenzi (30), Iliana Calabró & Fernando Castro (30), Sabrina Rojas & Cristián Ponce (30), María del Cerro & Nicolás Villalba (34), Federico Bal & Laura Fernández (37) and Nicole Neumann & Jorge Moliniers (37)
Saved by the judges: Federico Bal & Laura Fernández, María del Cerro & Nicolás Villalba, Iliana Calabró & Fernando Castro and Ezequiel Cwirkaluk & Bárbara Silenzi
Saved by the public: Nicole Neumann & Jorge Moliniers (51.32%)
Eliminated: Sabrina Rojas & Cristián Ponce (48.68%)

=== Round 16: Aquadance ===
Running order

Song and scores
Date	Couple	Song	Scores
21 November	Federico Bal & Laura Fernández	«Take a Look Around» (Limp Bizkit)	50 (10, 10, **10**, 10, 10)
21 November	Lizy Tagliani (Note: Replacement for Carla Conte.) & Marcos Beierbach	«Prohibido prohibir» (Sandra Mihanovich)	39 (8, 7, **8**, 8, 8)
22 November	Pedro Alfonso & Florencia Vigna	«Agua» (Los Piojos)	35 (7, 6, **9**, 9, 4)
22 November	Ángela Torres & Facundo Insúa	«Wrecking Ball» (Miley Cyrus)	47 (10, 10, **9**, 10, 8)
22 November	María del Cerro & Nicolás Villalba	«I Put a Spell on You» (Annie Lennox)	44 (8, 8, **8**, 10, 10)
24 November	Bárbara Vélez & Maximiliano Buitrago	Did not dance. Her withdrew from the competition.	
24 November	Charlotte Caniggia & Juan Leandro Nimo	«Beyond the Sea» (Robbie Williams)	35 (4, 6, **7**, 8, 10)
24 November	Ezequiel Cwirkaluk & Bárbara Silenzi	«Kiss from a Rose» (Seal)	31 (6, 7, **6**, 7, 5)
24 November	Iliana Calabró & Fernando Castro	«Love Me like You Do» (Ellie Goulding)	35 (6, 5, **8**, 8, 8)
25 November	Nicole Neumann & Jorge Moliniers	«Uninvited» (Alanis Morissette)	35 (7, 5, **8**, 9, 6)

Red numbers indicate the lowest score
Green numbers indicate the highest score

Sentenced: Ezequiel Cwirkaluk & Bárbara Silenzi (31), Charlotte Caniggia & Juan Leandro Nimo (35), Iliana Calabró & Fernando Castro (35), Nicole Neumann & Jorge Moliniers (35), Pedro Alfonso & Florencia Vigna (35) and Lizy Tagliani & Marcos Beierbach (39)
Saved by the judges: Pedro Alfonso & Florencia Vigna, Ezequiel Cwirkaluk & Bárbara Silenzi, Lizy Tagliani & Marcos Beierbach and Nicole Neumann & Jorge Moliniers
Saved by the public: Charlotte Caniggia & Juan Leandro Nimo (55.54%)
Eliminated: Iliana Calabró & Fernando Castro (44.46%)
Withdrew: Bárbara Vélez & Maximiliano Buitrago

=== Round 17: Trio cha-cha-cha ===
Running order

Song and scores
Date	Couple	Trio Dance Partner	Song	Scores
28 November	Ángela Torres & Facundo Insúa	Gisela Bernal	«Amor» (Ricky Martin)	46 (10, 10, 8, **10**, 8)
29 November	Federico Bal & Laura Fernández	Facundo Mazzei	«I Need to Know» (Marc Anthony)	49 (10, 10, 10, **10**, 9)
29 November	Ezequiel Cwirkaluk & Bárbara Silenzi	Melina Lezcano	«La Negra Tiene Tumbao» (Celia Cruz)	27 (5, 6, 7, **6**, 3)
1 December	Pedro Alfonso & Florencia Vigna	Lourdes Sánchez	«Echa pa' lante» (Thalía)	45 (10, 9, 8, **9**, 9)
1 December	Charlotte Caniggia & Juan Leandro Nimo	Adabel Guerrero	«Let's Get Loud» (Jennifer Lopez)	43 (8, 9, 9, **8**, 9)
1 December	María del Cerro & Nicolás Villalba	Jimena Barón	«Sway» (The Pussycat Dolls)	43 (8, 9, 8, **9**, 9)
2 December	Nicole Neumann & Jorge Moliniers	Gabriel Usandivaras	«Fever» (La India & Tito Puente and His Latin Ensemble)	47 (9, 9, 10, **10**, 9)
2 December	Carla Conte & Marcos Beierbach	Jimena Cyrulnik	«Falsas Esperanzas» (Christina Aguilera)	30 (5, 6, 5, **8**, 5)

Red numbers indicate the lowest score
Green numbers indicate the highest score

Sentenced: Ezequiel Cwirkaluk & Bárbara Silenzi (27), Carla Conte & Marcos Beierbach (30), Charlotte Caniggia & Juan Leandro Nimo (43) and María del Cerro & Nicolás Villalba (43)
Saved by the judges: María del Cerro & Nicolás Villalba and Charlotte Caniggia & Juan Leandro Nimo
Saved by the public: Ezequiel Cwirkaluk & Bárbara Silenzi (68.91%)
Eliminated: Carla Conte & Marcos Beierbach (31.09%)

=== Round 18: Latin pop ===
Song and scores
Date	Couple	Song	Scores
5 December	Federico Bal & Laura Fernández	«Dare (La La La)» (Shakira)	45 (**9**, 10, 8, 10, 8)
5 December	Nicole Neumann & Jorge Moliniers	«Bailar nada más» (Jennifer Lopez)	44 (**9**, 9, 8, 9, 9)
6 December	Pedro Alfonso & Florencia Vigna	«Madre Tierra (Oye)» (Chayanne)	41 (**7**, 9, (Note: Replaced by Florencia De La V.) 9, 9, 7)
6 December	Charlotte Caniggia & Juan Leandro Nimo	«Bailando» (Enrique Iglesias feat. Sean Paul, Descemer Bueno & Gente de Zona)	41 (**9**, 9, 7, 8, 8)
6 December	Ángela Torres & Facundo Insúa	«Adiós» (Ricky Martin)	45 (**9**, 10, 7, 10, 9)
8 December	Ezequiel Cwirkaluk & Bárbara Silenzi	«Que buena la noche» (Neon, el Emperador feat. Teknova)	37 (**7**, 8, (Note: Replaced by Lali Espósito.) 8, 8, 6)
8 December	María del Cerro & Nicolás Villalba	«Sofía» (Álvaro Soler)	44 (**7**, 10, 8, 9, 10)

Red numbers indicate the lowest score
Green numbers indicate the highest score

Sentenced: Ezequiel Cwirkaluk & Bárbara Silenzi (37), Charlotte Caniggia & Juan Leandro Nimo (41), Pedro Alfonso & Florencia Vigna (41), María del Cerro & Nicolás Villalba (44) and Nicole Neumann & Jorge Moliniers (44)
Saved by the judges: María del Cerro & Nicolás Villalba, Pedro Alfonso & Florencia Vigna and Nicole Neumann & Jorge Moliniers
Saved by the public: Ezequiel Cwirkaluk & Bárbara Silenzi (50.88%)
Eliminated: Charlotte Caniggia & Juan Leandro Nimo (49.12%)

=== Round 19: Free Style II ===
Running order

Song and scores
Date	Couple	Thematic	Song	Scores
9 December	Federico Bal & Laura Fernández	Joker & Harley Quinn	«Purple Lamborghini» (Skrillex & Rick Ross) «Gangsta» (Kehlani) «You Don't Own Me» (Grace feat. G-Eazy)	46 (10, 10, (Note: Replaced by Lali Espósito.) **8**, 10, 8)
9 December	Ángela Torres & Facundo Insúa	Fierce state (Inspired by Little Red Riding Hood & Big Bad Wolf)	«Bohemian Rhapsody» (Panic! at the Disco) «American Idiot» (Green Day)	42 (9, 8, **8**, 10, 7)
9 December	Ezequiel Cwirkaluk & Bárbara Silenzi	Urban dance	«24K Magic» (Bruno Mars)	48 (10, 10, **10**, 9, 9)
12 December	Pedro Alfonso & Florencia Vigna	Bailando's errors	«La Bicicleta» (Carlos Vives & Shakira)	45 (10, 5, **10**, 10, 10)
12 December	Nicole Neumann & Jorge Moliniers	Lover woman (Contemporary)	«Mujer amante» (Rata Blanca)	37 (8, 4, **8**, 9, 8)
12 December	María del Cerro & Nicolás Villalba	Ballroom dance: waltz, tango & samba	«Come Away with Me» (Norah Jones) «Penumbras» (Sandro) «Hip Hip Chin Chin» (Club des Belugas)	44 (9, 10, **8**, 9, 8)

Red numbers indicate the lowest score
Green numbers indicate the highest score

Sentenced: Nicole Neumann & Jorge Moliniers (37), Ángela Torres & Facundo Insúa (42) and María del Cerro & Nicolás Villalba (44)
Saved by the judges: María del Cerro & Nicolás Villalba
Saved by the public: Nicole Neumann & Jorge Moliniers (57.81%)
Eliminated: Ángela Torres & Facundo Insúa (42.19%)

=== Round 20: Country ===
Running order

Song and scores
Date	Couple	Song	Result
13 December	Federico Bal & Laura Fernández	«Chattahoochee» (Alan Jackson)	Semi-finalists
13 December	Nicole Neumann & Jorge Moliniers	«Wake Me Up» (Avicii)	Eliminated
13 December	Pedro Alfonso & Florencia Vigna	«Walk of Life» (Dire Straits)	Semi-finalists
13 December	María del Cerro & Nicolás Villalba	«Don't Tell Me» (Madonna)	Semi-finalists
13 December	Ezequiel Cwirkaluk & Bárbara Silenzi	«If You're Gonna Play in Texas» (Alabama)	Semi-finalists

Saved by the judges: Federico Bal & Laura Fernández, María del Cerro & Nicolás Villalba and Pedro Alfonso & Florencia Vigna
Saved by the public: Ezequiel Cwirkaluk & Bárbara Silenzi (58.12%)
Eliminated: Nicole Neumann & Jorge Moliniers (41.88%)

=== Semi-finals ===
==== 1st Semi-final ====
Running order

Song and scores
Date	Nº	Couple	Dance	Song	Judges' votes					Result
Date	Nº	Couple	Dance	Song	ÁdB	CA	MC	SS	MP	Result
14 December	1	Federico & Laura	Cumbia	«Ciudad mágica» (Agapornis)						Winners (1 pt)
14 December	1	Ezequiel & Bárbara	Cumbia	«Deja de llorar» (Ezequiel Cwirkaluk)						Losers
14 December	2	Federico & Laura	Bachata	«Get Lucky» (Willy William & LJ)						Losers
14 December	2	Ezequiel & Bárbara	Bachata	«Corazón Sin Cara» (Prince Royce)						Winners (1 pt)
14 December	3	Federico & Laura	Rock and Roll	«Vicio» (Ratones Paranoicos)						Losers
14 December	3	Ezequiel & Bárbara	Rock and Roll	«Hound Dog» (Tom Jones)						Winners (1 pt)
14 December	4	Federico & Laura	Merengue	«La gallera» (Juan Luis Guerra)						Winners (1 pt)
14 December	4	Ezequiel & Bárbara	Merengue	«Quiéreme» (Jean Carlos)						Losers

Totals
Date	Couple	Points	Telephone vote	Total
14 December	Federico Bal & Laura Fernández	2	**49.76%** (0)	2
14 December	Ezequiel Cwirkaluk & Bárbara Silenzi	2	**50.24%** (4)	6

Finalists: Ezequiel Cwirkaluk & Bárbara Silenzi
Semi-finalists: Federico Bal & Laura Fernández

==== 2nd Semifinal ====
Running order

Song and scores
Date	Nº	Couple	Dance	Song	Judges' votes					Result
Date	Nº	Couple	Dance	Song	ÁdB	CA	MC	SS	MP	Result
16 December	1	Pedro & Florencia	Cumbia	«Loquita» (Márama)						Losers
16 December	1	María & Nicolás	Cumbia	«Yo te propongo» (Rombai)						Winners (1 pt)
16 December	2	Pedro & Florencia	Bachata	«Te robaré» (Prince Royce)						Losers
16 December	2	María & Nicolás	Bachata	«When I Was Your Man» (Dzerej)						Winners (1 pt)
16 December	3	Pedro & Florencia	Tango	«Tinta roja» (Sebastián Piana & Cátulo Castillo)						Winners (1 pt)
16 December	3	María & Nicolás	Tango	«Canaro en París» (Juan Caldarella & Alejandro Scarpino)						Losers
16 December	4	Pedro & Florencia	Merengue	«Rompecintura» (Los Hermanos Rosario)						Winners (1 pt)
16 December	4	María & Nicolás	Merengue	«Chica sexy» (Banda XXI)						Losers

Totals
Date	Couple	Points	Telephone vote	Total
16 December	Pedro Alfonso & Florencia Vigna	2	**56.74%** (4)	6
16 December	María del Cerro & Nicolás Villalba	2	**43.26%** (0)	2

Finalists: Pedro Alfonso & Florencia Vigna
Semi-finalists: María del Cerro & Nicolás Villalba

=== Final ===
Running order

Song and scores
Date	Nº	Couple	Dance	Song	Judges' votes					Result
Date	Nº	Couple	Dance	Song	ÁdB	CA	MC	SS	MP	Result
19 December	1	Pedro & Florencia	Free Style II	«La Bicicleta» (Carlos Vives & Shakira)						Losers
19 December	1	Ezequiel & Bárbara	Free Style II	«24K Magic» (Bruno Mars)						Winners (1 pt)
19 December	2	Pedro & Florencia	Disco	«Love Never Felt So Good» (Michael Jackson feat. Justin Timberlake)						Winners (1 pt)
19 December	2	Ezequiel & Bárbara	Disco	«Get Lucky» (Daft Punk)						Losers
19 December	3	Pedro & Florencia	Reggaetón	«Perros salvajes» (Daddy Yankee)						Losers
19 December	3	Ezequiel & Bárbara	Reggaetón	«Shaky Shaky» (Daddy Yankee)						Winners (1 pt)
19 December	4	Pedro & Florencia	Cuarteto	«Hace calor» (Tru-la-lá)						Winners (1 pt)
19 December	4	Ezequiel & Bárbara	Cuarteto	«Fuego y pasión» (Rodrigo)						Losers

Totals
Date	Couple	Points	Telephone vote	Total
19 December	Pedro Alfonso & Florencia Vigna	2	**51.97%** (4)	6
19 December	Ezequiel Cwirkaluk & Bárbara Silenzi	2	**48.03%** (0)	2

Winners: Pedro Alfonso & Florencia Vigna
Runners-up: Ezequiel Cwirkaluk & Bárbara Silenzi
