= María Del Cerro =

Argentine actress (born 1985)

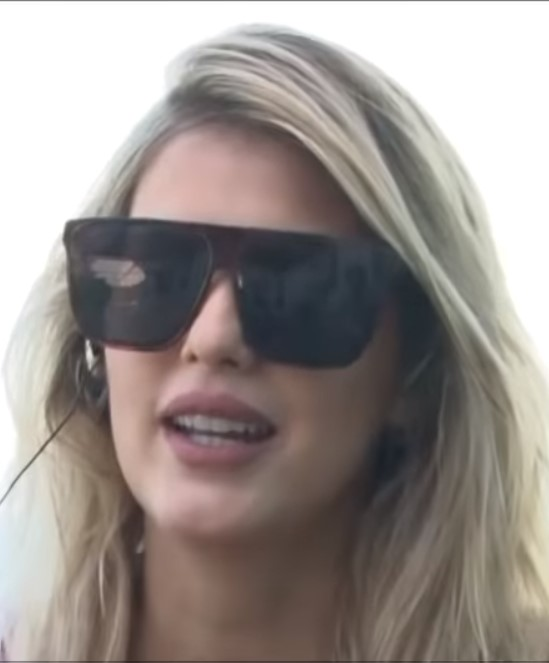
- Del Cerro in 2020
- Born: María Eugenia del Cerro; March 20, 1985 (age 41); Buenos Aires, Argentina
- Other name: Mery del Cerro
- Occupations: Actress; Model; Television presenter; Fashion Designer
- Years active: 2002-present
- Height: 1.73 m (5 ft 8 in)
- Partner(s): Benjamín Rojas (2006-2008); Jaime Bouquet Roldán (2010-present)
- Children: 2

María del Cerro (born March 20, 1985) is an Argentine model, actress, television presenter and fashion designer.

== Career ==
She started her career, participating in the reality show Super M 2002.

In 2006, she debuted as an actress in the youth television series Alma Pirata.

In 2007, she was part of the cast of the youth television series Romeo y Julieta.

From 2008 until 2010, she played Melody Paz, in the series Casi Ángeles. Also with Casi Ángeles she has toured Argentina, Chile, Spain, Israel, Italy, Mexico, Panama and Peru.

In 2011, she participated as Carolina in the first season of the television series Los únicos alongside Mariano Martínez, Nicolás Cabré, Nicolás Vázquez, Griselda Siciliani, Brenda Asnicar, María Eugenia Suárez, Jimena Barón, Claudia Fontán, Arnaldo André, Eugenia Tobal, Marcelo Mazzarello and Pepe Monje.

In 2012, she integrates the cast of the television series Lobo, on the screen of Canal 13.

From 2012 to 2013, she was part of the cast of the television series Dulce Amor.

In 2013, she acts in the miniseries Sandía con vino and debuts as a host of the program Yups. At the end of 2013 she presented her own line of swimsuits with Sweet Victorian, under the name of Mery.

From 2013 to 2014, she was part of the cast of the television series Taxxi, amores cruzados.

In 2014, she acts in the play Algunas mujeres a las que les cagué la vida alongside Marcelo Cosentino, María Fernanda Callejón, Miriam Lanzoni and Laura Bruni.

On television she host with Pablo Rago, Studio Movie Plus, for Studio Universal until the beginning of 2015.

In 2015, she works in her new line of swimsuits with Sweet Victorian and participate in the movie Chicos Católicos Apostólicos y Romanos.

In 2016, she participated in the dance reality show Bailando 2016. That same year she hosted Vestido de novia, for the television network Discovery Home & Health.

In 2017 she is fully dedicated to acting in theater and she works in the play Como el culo.

From 2017 to 2018, she was part of the cast of the television series Golpe al corazón.

In 2018, she host with Marcelo Polino Los especialistas del show, on the screen of Canal 9. In 2018, she makes a small participation in the television series Mi hermano es un clon.

In 2019, she host El Challenge: Desafío de Estilistas, on the screen of Telefe.

In 2021, she makes a small participation in the television series Pequeñas Victorias.

== Television programs ==
Year	Program	Channel	Notes
2002	Super M	Canal 13	Participant
2013	Yups	Yups TV	Host
2014-2015	Studio Movie Plus	Studio Universal	Host
2016	Bailando 2016	Canal 13	3rd place
2016-2017	Vestido de Novia: El gran día	Discovery Home & Health	Host
2018	Los especialistas del show	Canal 13	Host
2018	Bailando 2018	Canal 13	3rd place
2019	El Challenge: Desafío de Estilistas	Telefe	Host
2021	MasterChef Celebrity Argentina 2	Telefe	Guest
2021	El Challenge, Celebrities	Telefe	Host
2021–2022	MasterChef Celebrity Argentina 3	Telefe	17th eliminated

== Television ==
Year	Title	Character	Channel
2006	Alma Pirata	Rocío	Telefe
2007	Romeo y Julieta	Camille Donté	Canal 9
2007	Lalola	Model	América TV
2008-2010	Casi Ángeles	Melody Paz	Telefe
2011	Los únicos	Carolina Guzmán	Canal 13
2012	Lobo	Florencia Mujica	Canal 13
2012	Dulce Amor	Melina	Telefe
2013	Sandía con vino	Ariana	América TV
2013-2014	Taxxi, amores cruzados	Milagros	Telefe
2014	Las 13 esposas de Wilson Fernández	Magda	TV Pública
2015	Entre caníbales	Romina Casenave	Telefe
2017-2018	Golpe al corazón	Lucrecia	Telefe
2018	Mi hermano es un clon	Soledad	Canal 13
2021	Pequeñas Victorias	Natalia	Amazon Prime Video
2024-2026	Margarita	Yamila Puentes	Max

== Theater ==
Year	Title	Character	Director	Theater
2007	Pelota Paleta		Ezequiel Tronconi	Puerta Roja
2008-2010	Casi Ángeles	Melody Paz	Cris Morena	Teatro Gran Rex
2014	Algunas mujeres a las que les cagué la vida		Charly Nieto and Marcelo Cosentino	Picadilly
2017	Como el culo		Manuel González Gil	Teatro Tabarís and Multiteatro
2022	La verdad	Julieta	Ciro Zorzoli	Teatro Politeama

== Movies ==
Year	Movie	Character	Director
2014	Chicos Católicos Apostólicos y Romanos	Isabel del Palo	Juan Paya
