= Mingo y Aníbal, dos pelotazos en contra =

- Directed by: Enrique Cahen Salaberry
- Release date: 1984
- Running time: 103 minute
- Country: Argentina
- Language: Spanish

Mingo y Aníbal, dos pelotazos en contra is a 1984 Argentine film.

== Summary ==
Mingo and Aníbal are two friends who reside in the same neighborhood and frequently visit the Science and Sweat Club. On a particular day, they discover that the renowned tennis champion, María Miranda, has recently arrived in Buenos Aires. Overwhelmed by his infatuation for her, Aníbal implores Mingo to join him in a visit to the Sheraton hotel, where María is staying. Aníbal concocts an audacious plan to pose as his deceased uncle—an esteemed international police officer—in order to meet her. Little do they know that their scheme will set off a chain of misadventures, all the while a gang of criminals plots to pilfer the tennis champion's prized trophy.

== Cast ==
- Juan Carlos Altavista as Mingo
- Juan Carlos Calabró as Aníbal
- Susana Traverso as María Miranda
