= Iliana Calabró =

Argentine actress (born 1966)

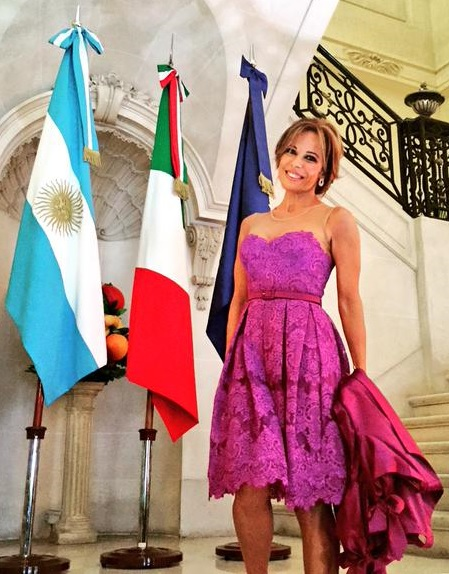
- Calabró in 2015
- Born: 1 June 1966 (age 58); Buenos Aires, Argentina
- Citizenship: Argentine, Italian
- Occupation: Actress
- Years active: 1978–present
- Spouse: Fabián Rossi (1990-2012)
- Partner: Antonello Grandolfo (2015-2019)
- Children: 2
- Parents: Juan Carlos Calabró (father); Aída Elena Picardi (mother)
- Relatives: Marina Calabró (sister)

Iliana Calabró (born 1 June 1966) is an Argentine actress. She is the daughter of late comedian Juan Carlos Calabró and sister of journalist Marina Calabró. She also holds Italian citizenship.

== Works ==
=== Television ===
- Calabromas (1978)
- El Contra (1992)
- Campeones de la vida (2000) - (2001)
- Historias de sexo de gente común (2004)
- Casados con hijos (2005)
- Cantando por un Sueño (2006)
- Bailando por un sueño (2007)
- Para siempre (2007)
- El show de Iliana (2008)
- El Musical de tus Sueños (2009)
- Cantando por un sueño (2012)
- Masterchef Celebrity Arg. (2020)

Realities shows

Year	Title	Role	Result	Notes
2005	Odisea, en busca del tesoro perdido	Blue team contestant		
2006	Cantando 2006	Contestant	Winner	
2007	Bailando por un sueño 2007	Contestant	15th eliminated	
2009	El Musical de tus Sueños	Contestant	12th eliminated	
2012	Cantando 2012	Contestant	19th eliminated	
2014	Viviendo con las Estrellas	Celebrity	11th eliminated	
2016	Tu Cara me Suena (season 3)	Contestant reemplacing Augusto Schuster	Lose	Gala 20
2016	Bailando 2016	Contestant	15th eliminated	
2020	Divina comida	Contestant and host in week 4	Runner-up	5 episodes
2020	MasterChef Celebrity Argentina	Contestant	5th eliminated	15 episodes
2020	MasterChef Celebrity Argentina	Candidate in repechage	Eliminated	5 episodes
2023	El Hotel De Los Famosos (season 2)	Visit		1 episode

=== Film ===
- Mingo y Aníbal contra los fantasmas (1985)
- Johnny Tolengo, el majestuoso (1987)
- Adiós, abuelo (1996)
- Papá se volvió loco (2005)
