= Gary (Argentine singer) =

Argentine singer

- Also known as: Gary El Angel (The Angel)
- Born: Edgar Efraín Fuentes; February 5, 1962; Embalse, Córdoba Province, Argentina
- Died: November 9, 2001 (aged 39) Córdoba, Argentina
- Genres: Cuarteto
- Occupation: Singer
- Years active: 1980–2001
- Formerly of: Tru-la-lá

Edgar Efraín Fuentes, better known as Gary (February 5, 1962 – November 9, 2001) was an Argentine singer of cuarteto songs. His records, first as one of the singers with Tru-la-lá band and then as a solo artist with his own band, sold 2 million copies during the 10 most active years of his career.

== Discography ==
- Lo que fui y lo que soy, 2000 - 2CD greatest hits
