= Johny Tolengo, el majestuoso =

Johnny Tolengo, el majestuoso
- Juan Carlos Calabró as Johny Tolengo
- Directed by: Gerardo Sofovich; Enrique Dawi
- Starring: Juan Carlos Calabró
- Edited by: Serafín Molina
- Music by: Juan Carlos Calabró
- Release date: July 16, 1987 (Buenos Aires)
- Running time: 90 minutes
- Country: Argentina
- Language: Spanish

Johny Tolengo, el majestuoso is a 1987 Argentine film. It had a high success, and helped the actor Juan Carlos Calabró to become a highly recognized comedian.

The character of Johnny Tolengo, a Buenos Aires socialite similar to Isidoro Cañones, was created in the TV show "Calabromas". In the movie, the character is a famous singer, dealing with extortions from the mafia. The movie released a soundtrack as well, sung by Calabró. Some songs like "Qué Alegría" or "Mis amigos los pibes" were adopted by soccer teams fans.

== Summary ==
Johnny Tolengo (Calabró) is a tremendously successful and "glamorous" singer, idolized by children. Upon his return from the United States, where he achieved the remarkable feat of winning the Oscars, Grammy, and Tony awards in a single season, he finds himself targeted by the mafia's extortion plot, coercing him into signing with a dubious record company. This sets off a chain of unforeseen adventures for Tolengo.

== Cast ==
- Juan Carlos Calabró
- Noemí Alan
- Guillermo Francella
- Nené Malbrán
- Naanim Timoyko
- Cacho Espíndola
- Ileana Calabró
- Los Bicivoladores
- Carlos Artigas
- Mónica Guido
- José Andrada
- Gisella Paz
- Carlos Serafino
- Navarro Melvín
- Jorge López Vidal
- José María Safigueroa
