= Betty Elizalde =

Argentinian journalist and broadcaster (1940–2018)

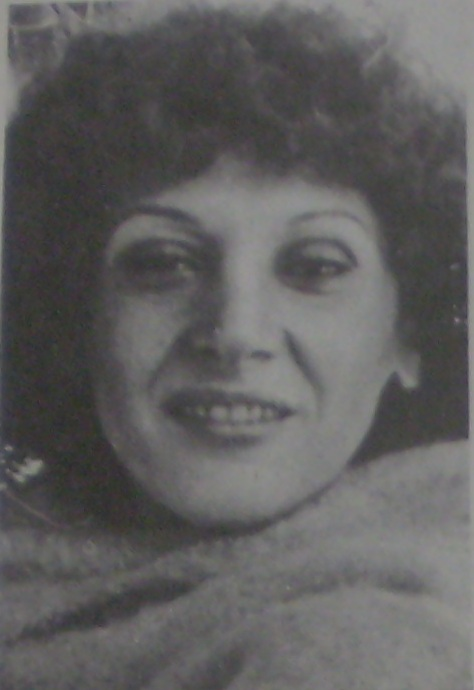
Betty Elizalde (1982)

Betty Elizalde (January 4, 1940 - November 30, 2018) was an Argentine journalist and broadcaster. She won the Konex Award in 1981.

== Biography ==
Deolinda Beatriz Bistagnino was born in Argentina, January 4, 1940. Her mother was of Spanish descent and her father was of Italian descent. She started working as a journalist at the age of eighteen. She was one of the classic voices of Argentine radio, in charge of several radio and television programs. Among these was "Siempre Betty" ("Always Betty") which she created in 1996 and conducted on the Radio de la Ciudad. In the 1970s, she had several radio successes, with "El buen día", for AM del Plata; "La burbuja", for Radio Belgrano; "Las siete lunas", for Radio Continental; and "Studio Fiat e Y a mí... ¿por qué me escucha?", for Radio Splendid.

On television, Elizalde worked as a news and information host during the 1970s and 1980s, on programs such as "60 minutos" for Televisión Pública Argentina and "De 7 a 8", broadcast simultaneously on El Nueve and Radio Belgrano.

Elizalde was the author of the book Perfiles ("Profiles", 1999). She died from lung cancer in Buenos Aires, November 30, 2018.

== Awards and honors ==
- Two Martín Fierro Awards (1974)
- Argentine Society of Broadcasters (1979)
- Esquiú Silver Cross (1979)
- Konex Award (1981)
- Golden Zebra (1983)
- Clarín Prize (2007, 2008, 2009)
