= El Lobista =

- Promotional poster
- Genre: Drama
- Created by: Patricio Vega
- Directed by: Daniel Barone
- Starring: Rodrigo de la Serna
- Country of origin: Argentina
- Original language: Spanish
- No. of seasons: 1
- No. of episodes: 10

Production
- Production companies: El Trece; TNT Latin America; Turner Latin America; Pol-ka Producciones; Cablevisión; Flow

Original release
- Network: El Trece; TNT Latin America
- Release: 31 May 2018 – present

El Lobista is an Argentine miniseries written by Patricio Vega, and it revolves around a manager with powerful contacts in power that specifies lucrative businesses for its clients. It stars Rodrigo de la Serna as the titular character. It is produced by El Trece, Pol-ka Producciones, Turner Latin America, TNT Latin America, Flow, and Cablevisión. The series is premiered on 31 May 2018 on TNT Latin America.

== Cast ==
- Rodrigo de la Serna as Matías Franco
- Darío Grandinetti
- Leticia Brédice
- Julieta Nair Calvo
- Alberto Ajaka
- Belén Chavanne
