= Juan Carlos Calabró =

Argentine actor and comedian

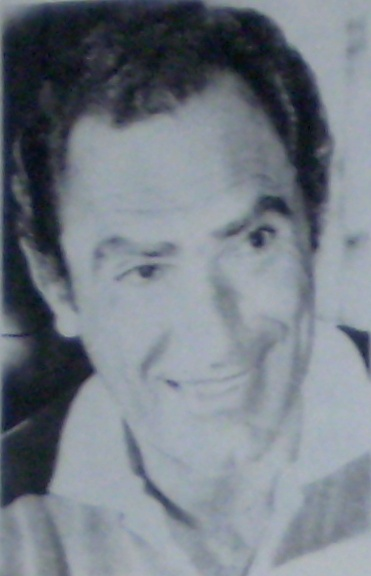
- Calabró in 1982
- Born: Juan Carlos Calabró; 3 February 1934; Buenos Aires, Argentina
- Died: 5 November 2013 (aged 79); Buenos Aires, Argentina
- Known for: Actor, humorist
- Notable work: Johny Tolengo, el majestuoso
- Spouse: Aída Elena Picardi
- Children: Iliana and Marina Calabró
- Awards: Martín Fierro (2013)

Juan Carlos Calabró (3 February 1934 – 5 November 2013) was an Argentine actor and comedian.

== Biography ==
He started on radio in the early sixties with the program "Farandulandia" and switched to television in 1962 with the hit comedy "Telecómicos". In that decade began working in the theater with "Extraña Pareja", by Neil Simon, at Buenos Aires theaters such as Maipo, National and Astros.

In 1978 began on television with a starring role in "Calabromas", program which with different formats and versions was a unique Argentine comedy event of the eighties. Memorable characters as the avant-garde and often underrated)"Johny Tolengo", "Gran Valor" and the tender and sincere "Aníbal (el pelotazo en contra)" developed for this program.

In the 1990s, his personal creation for television "El Contra" was another success. The character interacted with most stars from the time, and made them angry by forcing contradictions.

== Filmography ==
He worked in sixteen films in his career. Among them: Gran valor, Gran valor en la Facultad de Medicina, Diablito de barrio, Villa Cariño, Villa Cariño está que arde. He also made several cameos alongside the comedian Luis Sandrini, who was retiring permanently from film making. These include: La fiesta de todos (1978) and Frutilla (1980).

Other memorable works are staged with another star in the comedy show Argentine, Juan Carlos Altavista (in its role as "Minguito Tinguitella ') at Mingo y Aníbal, dos pelotazos en contra (1984), Mingo y Aníbal contra los fantasmas (1985) and the classic of absurd humor bizarre quintessential Argentine cinema: Mingo y Aníbal en la mansión embrujada (1986).

In 1987 he made a movie for another success from the hit factory Calabromas: Johny Tolengo, el majestuoso. Together with Susana Giménez starred in three films that were Donde duermen dos, duermen tres, Yo también tengo fiaca and Me sobra un marido.

In 1999 he participated in the hit television series Campeones de la vida and in the first half of the next decade, he returned to star in El Contra and collaborated with some chapters of the telenovela Padre Coraje (2004).

He was designated distinguished citizen of Mar del Plata in 2011, for making seasonal performances in the city for twenty years.
