= Tru-la-lá =

Argentine cuarteto band

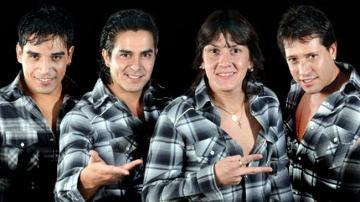

Tru-la-lá is one of the best known cuarteto bands in Argentina. The band's main singer for many years was Gary, "voice of an angel".
