= Elsa Bloise =

Argentine actress (died 2018)

Elsa Bloise (1925/1926 – 2 September 2018) was an Argentine theatre actress.

== Career ==
Bloise developed her career in the Argentine theater, starting in 2000, playing roles of grandmother or matriarch in works of great authors like Ivor Martinić in My Son Just Walks a Bit Slower. She was directed in the theater scene by Federico León, Hernán Peña, Adriana Desanzo, Diego Rinaldi, Hernán Morán, Osmar Núñez and Damiana Puglia. It was directed by José María Muscari in the works Laboratorio Muscari, Sensibilidad, Cumbia, Anarquía villera and the first version of Rights.

One of Bloise's last works was in My Son Just Walks a Bit Slower under the direction of Guillermo Cacace, where she stood out remarkably, and was one of the most outstanding works of the billboard of Buenos Aires. With good critics, the atmosphere came to be compared with Margotita, the fetish actress of the filmmaker Jorge Polaco, one of the promoters of the new Argentine cinema.

Bloise died on 2 September 2018, aged 92.

== Works ==
Bloise acted in the following stage works:

- 2014-2018: Mi hijo sólo camina un poco más lento.
- 2012-2013: Las multitudes.
- 2011-2012: Un tal Bustamante.
- 2009-2010: Qué me van a hablar de amor
- 2008-2009: Conventillos.
- 2008: Laboratorio Muscari.
- 2007: Las voces de Julia.
- 2006-2008: La mejor solución.
- 2005-2006: Sensibilidad.
- 2003-2004: Derechas.
- 2001: 1900 tango.
- 2000: Cumbia, anarquía villera
