= Anita Martínez =

Argentine actress, comedian, dancer and television host

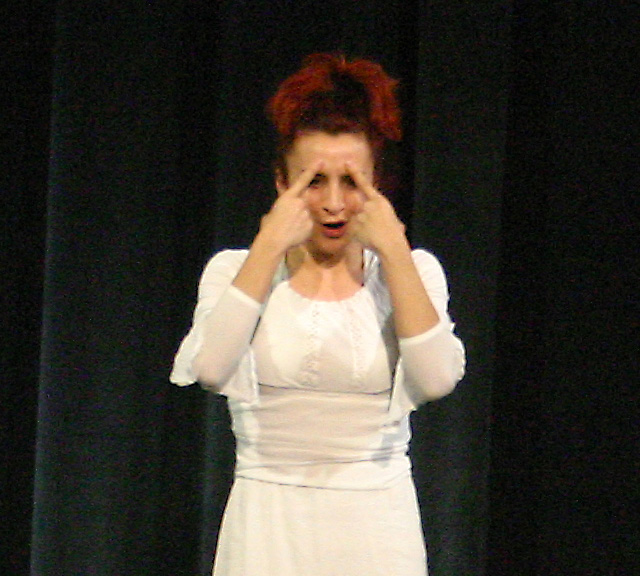
- Anita Martinez in 2004
- Born: 15 March 1975 (age 51); Buenos Aires, Argentina
- Other name: Ana Elvira Martínez
- Website: http://www.anitamartinez.tv/

Ana Elisa Martínez (born 18 March 1975 in Buenos Aires, Argentina) popularly known as Anita Martínez is an Argentine actress, comedian, dancer, and television host.

She has won two Martín Fierro Awards for her comedian work in en Noche de Ronda, Showmatch, and Animales Sueltos. She has also received a Vos Award for her work in theatre.

== Biography ==
She started studying classical dance. Later, she decided to study musical theatre. She got her first job on television after being selected to host for the Argentine sports channel TyC Sports.

After going through several jobs, a producer convinced her to study acting:

«I started in social club and sports, following the legendary Mar de Fondo... I never wanted to be an actress, but I liked it and everything came from there: Telefe, Videomatch, Los Felipe, Vale la Pena!, Franco Buenaventura. I failed a lot, but it helped me to realize what I did not have to do... and kept doing it. Las chicas de la calle, la Casa de América, and others that are best not to remember.»

— Anita Martínez in an interview

At the end of 1996, she presented the children's television program Todo bien with Marcelo Mingochea on Channel 13.

In 1997, she made her theatrical debut with the play Pijamas, which she continued to perform until 1999. During the 2000 theatrical season, she performed in El Show de las Divorciadas. Between 2004 and 2005 she acted in the comedy series Panadería Los Felipe. In 2005, she participated in the comedy program Vale la pena, along with Fabián Gianola. In cinema, she participated in Apasionados and in El cine de Mailte. For several years, she advertised the Harpic toilet bowl cleaner.

In 2008, she performed in the stage play Planeta Show, alongside the renowned Argentine humorist Jorge Ginzburg.

In 2013, she starred in her one-woman show, De Vuelta al Barrio.

She was also a part of the reality television Bailando por un Sueño in 2014, which was broadcast on Showmatch. Martinez and fellow comedian Marcos Bicho Gómez became the leading competitors with 59.42% of the public vote. Martinez won second place against Ximena Capristo after four months of competition. She returned to the competition after Cecilia Oviedo resigned, after she suffered severe injuries while rehearsing two weeks into the contest. In 2016, she competed again with Gómez in Bailando por un Sueño and won fourteenth place after five months of competition.

At the end of 2016, she participated in Flavio Mendoza's work Mahatma alongside Facundo Mazzei, Barbie Franco, and the Spanish rock band, Iceberg del Sur.

== Theater ==
Year	Title
1998-1999	Pijamas
2000	El show de las divorciadas
2001	Daikiri de humor
2002	El país del nomeacuerdo
2003	Locas de atar
2004-2005	El reino del revés
2008	Planeta show
2009	Confesiones de mujeres de 30
2010	El Gran Burlesque
2010	HisterioTipos
2013	Despedida de casado
2013-2014	De vuelta al barrio
2014	Estrellas del Varieté
2015	Anita y El Bicho
2015	La Más Pior
2017	Mahatma

== Television ==
Year	Title	Role	Notes
1996	Todo bien	Presenter	Junto a Marcelo Mingochea
2001	Despojados		
2001	Yago, pasión morena	Luisa	
2004-2005	Panadería «Los Felipe»	Lucy	
2005	Vale la pena		
2007	Patinando por un sueño	Participant	Won 2nd place
2008	La Casa de América		
2009	Animales sueltos	Panelist	
2009-2010	Este es el show	Imitadora	
2010	Humor de primera		
2014	Bailando por un sueño 2014	Participant	Won 1st place
2015	Bailando por un sueño 2015	Participant	1º Abandono
2016	Polémica en el bar	La maestra / Adelmar / Qp	
2016	Bailando por un sueño 2016	Participant	12° participante eliminada.

== Movies ==
Year	Title
2002	Apasionados
2005	Papá se volvió loco
2008	El cine de Maite
2014	Socios por accidente
2015	Socios por accidente 2

== Radio ==
Year	Title
2015 - Presente	Sarasa (La 100)

== Awards and nominations ==
Year	Association	Category	Nominated work	Result
2002	Premio Martín Fierro	Revelación	Yago, pasión morena	Nominated
2008	Premio Martín Fierro	Labor humorística femenina	Noche de ronda	Won
2009	Premio Martín Fierro	Labor humorística femenina	La risa es bella	Nominated
2010	Premio Martín Fierro	Labor humorística femenina	ShowMatch y Animales sueltos	Won
2015	Premios VOS	Mejor Actriz	Anita y el Bicho, una historia de humor	Won
