= Nicole Neumann =

Argentine model (born 1980)

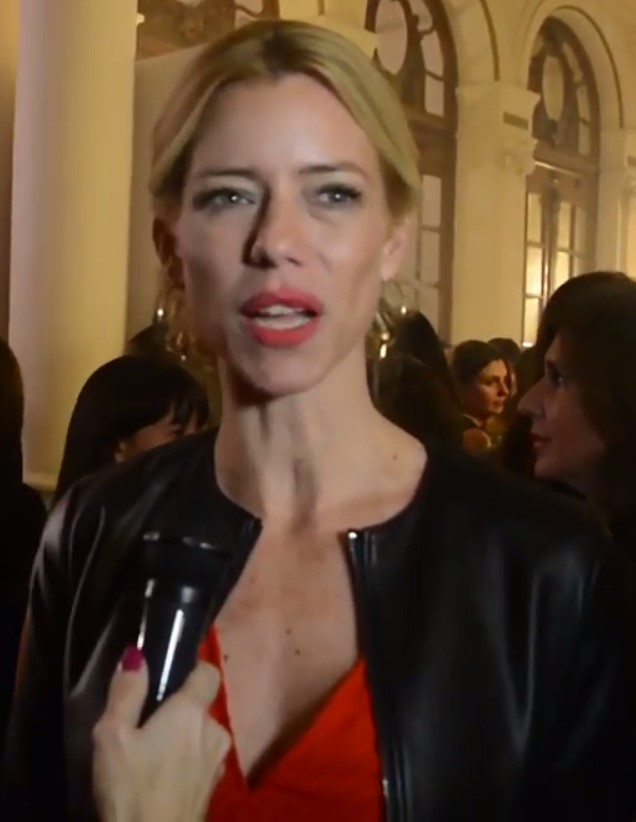
- Nicole Neumann in 2017
- Born: Nicole Unterüberbacher Neumann; 31 October 1980 (age 45); Buenos Aires, Argentina
- Other name: Nikita Neumann
- Occupations: Model, businesswoman and TV host
- Spouses: Nacho Herrero (m. 2005; div. 2006) Fabián Cubero (m. 2008; div. 2018) José Manuel Urcera (m. 2023)
- Partner(s): Matías Liberman (2004); Matías Tasín (2018–2019)
- Children: Indiana Cubero (b. 2008); Allegra Cubero (b. 2011); Sienna Cubero (b. 2014)
- Modeling information
- Height: 1.75 m (5 ft 9 in)
- Hair color: Blond
- Eye color: Green

Nicole Neumann (born 31 October 1980) is an Argentine model, businesswoman, and television host.

== Biography ==
After her birth Neumann moved with her family to Salzburg, Austria, her father's place of origin. When Neumann was 1 year old her parents divorced and she returned with mother Claudia to her native country where she had a half-sister named Geraldine Conti. Shortly after, they settled in Córdoba, Argentina. They later moved to Belgrano.

== Career ==
Nicole Neumann first worked in a TV advertisement at the age of 4. She became a model at the age of 12, being the youngest model at the time. Due to her young age Gente magazine labelled her "Lolita", after the book by Vladimir Nabokov, in a magazine cover published in 1992. She worked as a model for Pancho Dotto and Roberto Giordano, and internationally at Paris and Milan. She has worked for clothing brands such as Versace and Nina Ricci. She posed nude for the Gente magazine in 2001 with the model Pampita, saying that it benefited both of them. They both had several conflicts in later years.

== Personal life ==
In summer of 2004 she was seen with the model Nacho Herrero on a beach in Punta del Este while she was still dating her manager Matías Liberman shortly after she separated from him and made her engagement official with Nacho Herrero, marrying him but the marriage would last little the couple is separated the following year for her romance with footballer Fabián Cubero. She took part in a photo session with the football players Mariano Pavone, Marcos Angeleri, Leandro Somoza and Fabián Cubero, in 2006. She started a relation with Fabián Cubero in 2006. She married him two years later. They have three daughters. In May 2017 Fabián Cubero and Nicole Neumann split up and in April 2018 they formalized their divorce after eleven years of marriage.

She married the motor racing driver, José Manuel Urcera, in 2023, after two years of dating.

== Acting credits ==
=== Television ===
Year	Title	Role	Channel	Notes
1996	90-60-90 modelos		Canal 9	Cast Member
1996	Viva el lunes		Universidad Católica de Chile	Guest
1999–2000	Cabecita	Bárbara	Telefe	Antagonist
2005	D- Tour	Herself	MTV	Reality Show
2007	Estilo Nicole	TV host	Fox Sports	Television Show
2009	Simplemente Nicole	TV host	C5N	Television Show
2009	El musical de tus sueños	Participant	El Trece	11°place
2010	FTV Mag	TV host	FTV	Fashion Program
2010	Botineras	Herself	Telefe	cameo
2011	Bailando por un sueño 2011	Participant	El Trece	6°place
2013	Animales sueltos	Co-conductor	América	TV show
2015	Todo Verano	TV host	Telefe	TV show
2016	Loco por vos	Herself	Telefe	Special participation
2016	Bailando por un sueño 2016	Participant	El Trece	5°place
2016	Mujeres con Nicole	TV host	FWTV	
2017–present	Cortá por Lozano	Panelista	Telefe	TV show
2017	Diario 16	TV host	KZO	TV show
2018–present	Tardes nuestras	TV host	KZO	TV show

=== Movies ===
Year	Movie	Role	Director
1999	Esa maldita costilla	Beautiful young lady	Juan José Jusid
2013	Back to the Siam		Gonzalo Roldán
2014	Cosano: La vida secreta de un vestido	Herself	Diego Leby and Pablo Leby
2016	Resentimental		Diego Damario

=== Theater ===
Year	Work	Role	Director
2005–2006	Los locos mandan	Vedette	Nito Artaza
