= Cuestión de peso =

Cuestión de peso (Spanish: A matter of weight) is an Argentine reality show that features a number of overweight people and tracks their daily attempts to reduce their weight. It is produced by Endemol and aired by El Trece. It was hosted from 2006 to 2008 by Andrea Politti, and by Claribel Medina from 2010 to modern day. The format was bought by Chile, Paraguay and Spain.

== Season 1 (2006) ==
=== Contestants ===
Name	Age	Initial weight	Residence	Status
Maximiliano Oliva	25	200.0	Buenos Aires	Winner
Luis Martínez, Luisito	22	205.1	Córdoba, Córdoba	Runner-up
Alicia Simón	42	154.0	La Plata, Buenos Aires	Discharged
Cristian Magrelli	29	155.2	Buenos Aires	7th evicted
Sofía Santorini	22	162.2	Paraná, Entre Ríos	6th evicted
José Luis Sklummembërg	30	136.8	Buenos Aires	Discharged
Sara Fochlë	41	125.3	Rosario, Santa Fe	5th evicted
Leonel Herrera	33	145.5	Mar del Plata, Buenos Aires	Discharged
Silvia Karationis	27	153.2	Rosario, Santa Fe	4th evicted
Fernando Mea	33	129.0	Daireaux, Buenos Aires	3rd evicted
Tatiana Benavente	22	137.5	Ushuaia, Tierra del Fuego	2nd evicted
Mariano Kizsyna	32	154.2	Buenos Aires	1st evicted
