= Graciela Araujo =

Argentine actress (1930–2019)

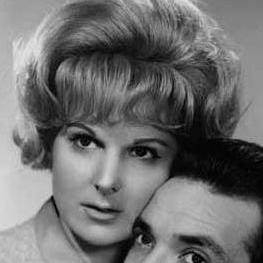
- Born: 24 September 1930; La Plata, Argentina
- Died: 3 May 2019 (aged 88); Buenos Aires, Argentina
- Occupation: Actor

Graciela Araujo (24 September 1930 – 3 May 2019) was an Argentine film and TV actor.

== Death ==
Graciela Araujo died in Buenos Aires on 3 May 2019, aged 88, from undisclosed causes. She was cremated at the Chacarita Cemetery.

== Filmografie ==
- 1962: Teleteatro Odol (TV Series 1962, 1 episode)
- 1963: Teleteatro Palmolive-Colgate del aire (TV Series, 1 episode)
- 1966: Carola y Carolina (TV Series 1966, 3 episodes)
- 1965-1970: Su comedia favorita (TV Series, 3 episodes)
- 1970: Gran teatro universal (TV Series, 1 episode)
- 1970: El teleteatro de Alberto Migré (TV Series)
- 1964-1971: Teleteatro Palmolive del aire (TV Series, 2 episodes)
- 1971: Teleteatro Palmolive del aire (TV Series 1971, 1 episode)
- 1973: Platea 7 (TV Series 1973, 1 episode)
- 1973: Cacho de la esquina (TV Series 1973, 19 episodes)
- 1974: El teatro de Jorge Salcedo (TV Series, 3 episodes)
- 1979-1981: Los especiales de ATC (TV Series, 2 episodes)
- 1981: El mundo del espectáculo (TV Series, 1 episode)
- 1990: I, the Worst of All
- 1990: Yo, la peor de todas
- 1992: Soy Gina (TV Series, 19 episodes)
- 1992: Luces y sombras (TV Series, 19 episodes)
- 1992: Amores (TV Series 1992, 1 episode)
- 1993: A Wall of Silence
- 1993: Un muro de silencio
- 1971-1995: Alta comedia(TV Series, 6 episodes)
- 1996: Cartoon Family (TV Series)
- 1998: Como vos & yo (TV Series 1998, 99 episodes)
- 2012: El Tabarís, lleno de estrellas (TV Movie)
