= Simona (TV series) =

- Genre: Telenovela; Comedy; Music
- Created by: Adrián Suar
- Written by: Claudio Lacelli; Lily Ann Martin
- Directed by: Rodolfo Antúnez; Sebastián Pivotto
- Starring: Ángela Torres; Gastón Soffritti; Juan Darthés; Ana María Orozco; Romina Gaetani; Agustín Casanova; Renato Quattordio
- Theme music composer: Florencia Bertotti; Willie Lorenzo
- Opening theme: Simona Va by Ángela Torres
- Country of origin: Argentina
- Original language: Spanish
- No. of episodes: 154

Production
- Producer: Adrián Suar
- Production locations: Buenos Aires, Argentina
- Running time: 60 minutes
- Production company: Pol-ka

Original release
- Network: El Trece
- Release: 22 January – 31 August 2018

Related
- Las Estrellas; Mi hermano es un clon

Simona is a 2018 Argentine telenovela produced by Pol-ka and broadcast by El Trece from 22 January to 31 August 2018.

== Cast ==
- Ángela Torres as Simona Sánchez/Mendoza
- Gastón Soffritti as Romeo Guerrico
- Juan Darthés as Diego Guerrico
- Ana María Orozco as Marilina Mendoza
- Romina Gaetani as Sienna Velasco
- Agustín Casanova as Dante Guerrico
- Renato Quattordio as Lucas "Junior" Guerrico
- Gabriel Gallicchio as Blas Quevedo Linares
- Darío Barassi as Pablo "Paul" Medina
- Mercedes Scápola as Ángeles "Angie" Buero
- María Rosa Fugazot as Rosa
- Thais Rippel as Chipi
- Minerva Casero as Ailín Medina
- Federico Olivera as Santiago Solano
- Fausto Bengoechea as Piru
- Vanesa Butera as Lucrecia Juárez
- Agustina Cabo as Agustina Becker
- Florencia Vigna as Trinidad "Trini" Beruti
- Patricia Echegoyen as Javiera Fornide
- Marcelo Mazzarello as Juan Alberto "Johnny" Lambaré
- Andrés Gil as Leonardo "Leo"
- Stefanía Roitman as Lucila "Lula" Achával
- Yayo Guridi as Oscar Torreta
- Christian Inglize as Alan
