= Cuarteto =

Musical genre born in Córdoba, Argentina

- Stylistic origins: Pasodoble; Tarantella; Gaita zuliana
- Cultural origins: Argentina (Córdoba). (Spanish and Italian peoples, early 1940s).
- Typical instruments: Accordion; Electronic keyboard; Piano; Double bass; Violin; Electric guitar; Bass guitar; Drum kit; Conga; Trumpet; Trombone; Saxophone

Cuarteto: music, dance and lyrics in the city of Córdoba, Argentina
- UNESCO Intangible Cultural Heritage
- Country: Argentina
- Reference: 02243
- Region: Latin America and the Caribbean

Inscription history
- Inscription: 2025 (20th session)
- List: Representative

Cuarteto (Spanish: quartet), sometimes called cuartetazo, is a musical genre born in Córdoba, Argentina.

The roots of the cuarteto ensemble are in Italian and Spanish dance ensembles. The name was coined because the early dance-hall numbers were invariably four-piece bands (violin-piano-accordion-bass).

Cuarteto is almost always upbeat; its rhythm range is similar to that of modern Dominican merengue.

In the 1970s, cuarteto became one of the cornerstones of Córdoba's cultural identity—together with Hortensia magazine. Both reflected a local brand of popular culture overlooked by the establishment, and proposed an alternative to the Buenos Aires-centered culture that television was spreading to the rest of the country.

Cuarteto was one of the genres that gave birth to the Buenos Aires tropical scene, which was renamed as bailanta in the 1990s following the usage of Corrientes province.

== Famous Names ==
Cuarteto Leo was the leading cuarteto band for almost 30 years, back in the 1970s. It established the sonic texture that prevails in cuarteto to this day.

In the 1980s, Carlos Mona Jiménez became the foremost exponent of cuarteto after the break-up of his two-member Cuarteto de Oro ("Golden Quartet"). He established a pattern of nonsense humour and extravagant behavior that many tried to ape without much success. One of his most popular songs was Quién se ha tomado todo el vino ("Who drank all the wine?"), which was danced with a characteristic hand move.

Others, such as producer-bandleader Negro Videla, travelled to the Dominican Republic and Colombia to expand the range of their repertoire. Videla is the unofficial ambassador of Dominican music in cuarteto, with successful covers of merengue hits.

Since the late 1980s, the Tru-la-lá band has had great support from dancers. At one point they were endorsed by the Catholic church for avoiding racy themes in their lyrics. All in all, they have sold over a million records.

Rodrigo became the leading cuarteto singer in the mid-1990s, and made inroads into Buenos Aires middle-class audiences. He died in a car crash on June 24, 2000. Many people believe the crash was not an accident, as Rodrigo was (allegedly) a pawn in a feud between rival mobsters. His song La mano de Dios (The Hand of God), which celebrates Diego Maradona through his most famous goal, has become a classic dance song in Argentina, and was covered by Maradona himself in his successful 2005 talk show.

Gary was another Cuarteto singer with the Tru-la-lá band, who died of natural causes in 2001.

== See also ==
- Music of Argentina
