= Ángela Torres =

Argentine actress and singer (born 1998)

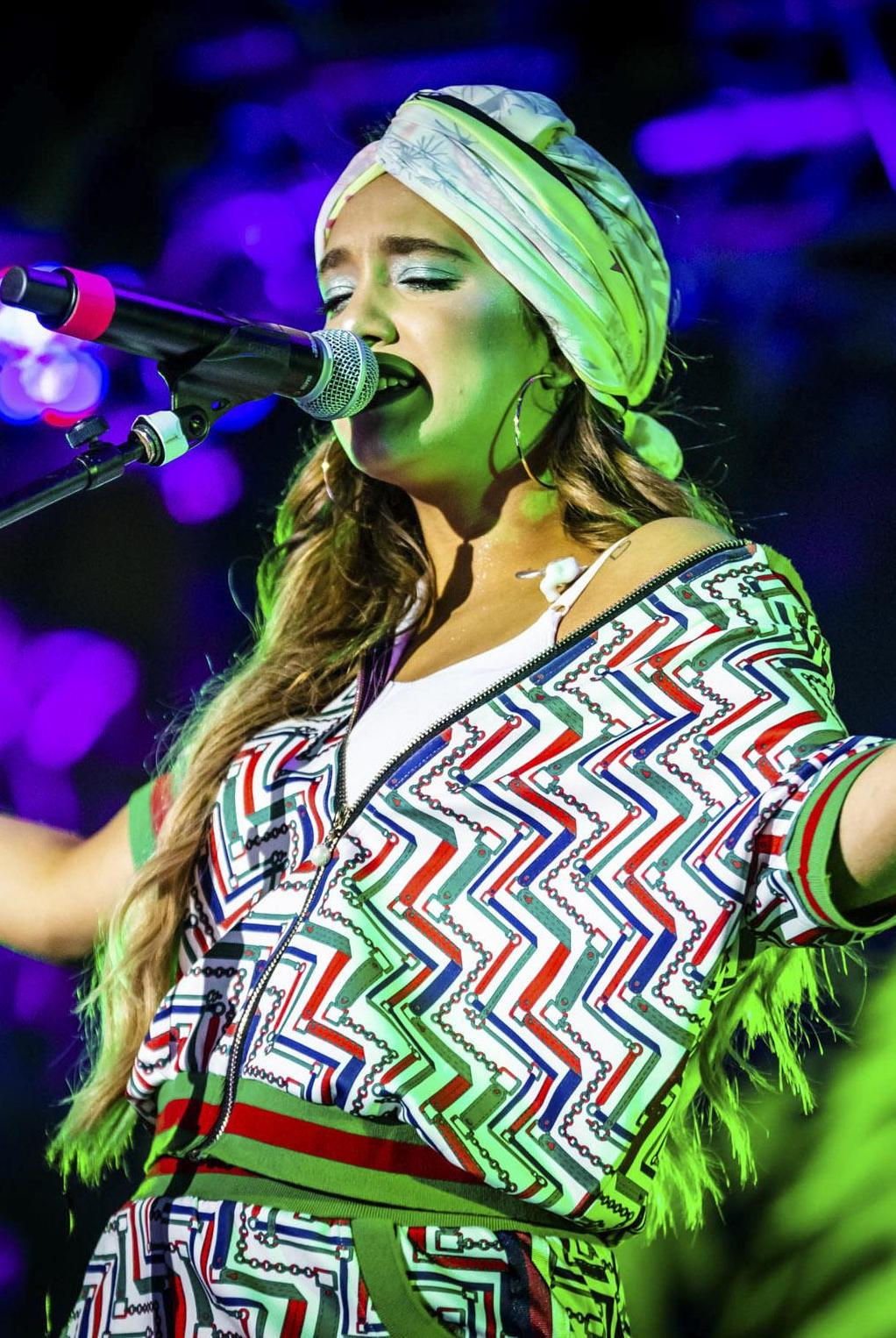
- Torres in 2018
- Born: Ángela Azul Concepción Caccia Curra; 13 August 1998 (age 28); Avellaneda, Buenos Aires, Argentina
- Occupations: Actress; singer
- Years active: 2008–present
- Mother: Gloria Carrá
- Relatives: Diego Torres (uncle); Lolita Torres (grandmother)

Ángela Azul Concepción Caccia Curra (born 13 August 1998), better known as Ángela Torres, is an Argentine actress and singer. She is the daughter of actress Gloria Carrá and musician Marcelo Torres, niece of popular singer Diego Torres, and granddaughter of Lolita Torres. She has also taken part in several musical comedies such as "The Sound of Music" and "Peter Pan" y protagonizó la exitosa tira juvenil "Simona" de Polka en 2018.

== Career ==
In 2008 she made her television debut in the series Patito Feo, produced by the Argentine company Ideas del Sur and starring Juan Darthés and Griselda Siciliani. She featured in six episodes of the series, which was carried by the channel El Trece.

In April 2012 she appeared in the Argentine film Extraños en la noche starring her uncle, Diego Torres. In May 2012 she appeared in her first major television role, playing Paloma Cocker in the series Condicionados, and her performance earned her a nomination for the Tato Awards.

== Personal life ==
Ángela Torres is closely related to several famous artists. Her mother is Gloria Carrá, her father is Marcelo Torres, her uncle is Diego Torres, and her grandmother is Lolita Torres. Growing up in this family influenced her to begin studying theater at eight years old.

== Television ==
Year	Title	Character	Channel	Notes
2008	Patito Feo	Antonia	El Trece	6 episodes
2012	Condicionados	Paloma Cocker	El Trece	
2013	Solamente vos	Mora Cousteau	El Trece	Main cast
2014	Tu cara me suena 2		Telefe	Winner
2015–2016	Esperanza mía	Lola Fiore	El Trece	Main cast
2015	Bailando 2015		El Trece	Special guest by Cinthia Fernández
2016	Bailando 2016		El Trece	19th eliminated
2018	Simona	Simona Sánchez	Trece	Lead role
2021–present	Días de gallos	Rafaela "Raff"	HBO Max	Lead role

== Movies ==
Year	Title	Character	Director	Notes
2012	Extraños en la noche (movie)	Azul	Alejandro Montiel	
2016	Gilda, no me arrepiento de este amor	Gilda (teenager)	Lorena Muñoz	
2017	Los padecientes	Camila Vanussi	Nicolás Tuozzo	
2017	Un viaje a la luna	Iris	Joaquín Cambre	
2023	Family Album	Eli	Guillermo Rocamora	

== Theater ==
Year	Title	Character	Theater
2011	Irreal	Lía	Ofelia Casa Teatro
2012	La novicia rebelde	Brigitta Von Trapp	Teatro Ópera
2014	Criatura emocional	Distantos personajes en differentes monólogos	Teatro Tabarís
2015	Esperanza mía, el musical	Lola Fiore	Teatro Ópera/ Luna Park
2016 - 2017	Peter Pan, todos podemos volar	Tigrilla	Teatro Gran Rex
2017	El diario de Ana Frank	Ana Frank	Teatro 25 de mayo
2017	Peter Pan, todos podemos volar	Tigrilla	

== Discography ==
=== Albums ===
==== Studio albums ====
List of studio albums with selected details
Title	Details
No Me Olvides	Released: 23 July 2025; Label: Sony Music Uruguay; Formats: Digital download, streaming

==== Soundtrack albums ====
List of soundtrack albums, with selected details and chart positions
Title	Details	Peaks
Title	Details	ARG
Simona	Released: 22 January 2018; Label: Warner Argentina; Formats: CD, digital download	5

==== Live albums ====
List of live albums, with selected details
Title	Details
Simona en Vivo	Released: 21 September 2018; Label: Warner Argentina; Formats: digital download

=== Extended plays ===
List of extended plays, with selected details
Title	Details
La Niña de Fuego	Released: 25 February 2021; Label: Warner Argentina; Format: digital download, streaming

=== Singles ===
==== As lead artist ====
List of singles as lead artist, showing year released, chart positions, and originating album
Title	Year	Peaks	Album
Title	Year	ARG	Album
"Vueltas al Reloj"	2015	—	Non-album single
"La Vida Rosa"	2016	—	Non-album single
"Suerte"	2019	—	Non-album single
"Aló"	2020	— (Note: "Aló" did not enter the Billboard Argentina Hot 100, but peaked at number 4 on the Monitor Latino Argentina National Songs chart.)	La Niña de Fuego
"Guapo"	2020	— (Note: "Guapo" did not enter the Billboard Argentina Hot 100, but peaked at number 6 on the Monitor Latino Argentina National Songs chart.)	La Niña de Fuego
"Flotando"	2020	—	La Niña de Fuego
"LNDF"	2021	—	La Niña de Fuego
"Me Perdí" (with Lara91k)	2021	—	Non-album singles
"Me Di Cuenta" (with Sael)	2022	—	Non-album singles
"Deja Vu"	2022	—	Non-album singles
"Me Va Muy Bien"	2022	—	Non-album singles
"OMG" (with Robleis)	2022	—	Non-album singles
"Kitty"	2022	—	Non-album singles
"Awch"	2023	—	Non-album singles
"Nasty Girl" (with Yami Safdie and Luana featuring Ingratax)	2023	—	Non-album singles
"Fiebre"	2024	—	Non-album singles
"Mitad" (with Rusherking)	2024	—	Non-album singles
"Castigo"	2024	—	Non-album singles
"Favorita"	2025	18	No Me Olvides
"Placard"	2025	—	No Me Olvides
"Vértigo"	2026	—	No Me Olvides
"Torpe"	2026	15	Non-album single
"21 de agosto"	2026	—	Non-album single
"—" denotes a recording that did not chart or was not released in that territory.

==== As featured artist ====
List of singles, showing year released and selected chart positions
Title	Year	Peak chart positions									
Title	Year	COL Pop	DR Pop	ECU Pop	ES Pop	HON Pop	NIC Pop	PAN Pop	PAR Pop	URU	US Latin Pop
"Color Esperanza" (Note: In May 2020, Sony Music Latin and Global Citizen teamed up to release a new version of the 2001 Diego Torres's song "Color Esperanza" to benefit the Pan American Health Organization's (PAHO) response to the COVID-19 pandemic. The track includes vocals by Ángela Torres, Diego Torres, Lali, Rubén Blades, Mario Domm, Camilo, Pedro Capó, Coti, Dilsinho, El Cigala, Farruko, Fonseca, Kany García, Leonel García, Gente de Zona, Leslie Grace, Nicky Jam, Ara Malikian, Dani Martín, Mau y Ricky, Prince Royce, Rauw Alejandro, Reik, Río Roma, Carlos Rivera, Ivete Sangalo, Thalía, Manuel Turizo, Jorge Villamizar and Carlos Vives.) (Diego Torres featuring various artists)	2020	11	5	13	19	4	5	11	11	4	21
"SINVERGÜENZA" (Emanero, Karina and J mena featuring Ángela Torres)	2023	—	—	—	—	—	—	—	—	—	—
"FINGIA" (La Joaqui and Ángela Torres)	2026	—	—	—	—	—	—	—	—	—	—

==== Promotional singles ====
List of promotional singles, showing year released and originating album
Title	Year	Album
"Simona Va"	2015	Simona
"Viaje a la Luna"	2018	Un Viaje a la Luna

=== Guest appearances ===
List of non-single guest appearances, other artists, and originating album
Title	Year	Other artist(s)	Album
"Hacia Adelante"	2015	None	Esperanza Mía
"El Camino"	2015	Diego Torres	Buena Vida
"Sólo Dios Sabe"	2016	Natalia Oreiro	Gilda, No Me Arrepiento de Este Amor
"Indios"	2016	Alejandro De Santis	Las Canciones de Peter Pan (Todos Podemos Volar)
"Invisible para Él"	2016	None	Las Canciones de Peter Pan (Todos Podemos Volar)
"Más Allá"	2018	None	Un Viaje a la Luna
"Luna Roja"	2018	None	Un Viaje a la Luna
"Ojitos de Md (remix)"	2020	Axel Fiks	Non-album song
