= Mi hermano es un clon =

- Genre: Telenovela; Comedy
- Created by: Marcelo Nacci; Laura Barneix
- Directed by: Martín Sabán; Rodolfo Antúne
- Starring: Nicolás Cabré; Gimena Accardi; Flor Vigna; Luis Machín; Andrea Bonelli; Fabián Vena
- Opening theme: Yo contigo, tú conmigo by Morat and Álvaro Soler
- Country of origin: Argentina
- Original language: Spanish
- No. of episodes: 93

Production
- Executive producer: Adrián González
- Running time: 60 minutes
- Production company: Pol-ka

Original release
- Network: El Trece
- Release: 3 September 2018 – 11 January 2019

Related
- Simona; Argentina, tierra de amor y venganza

Mi hermano es un clon (English title: My Brother is a Clone) is an Argentine telenovela produced by Pol-ka and broadcast by El Trece from 3 September 2018 to 11 January 2019.

== Cast ==
=== Main ===
- Nicolás Cabré as Renzo Figueroa / Mateo Mónaco
- Gimena Accardi as Lara Alcorta / Patricia López
- Flor Vigna as Ámbar Martini
- Luis Machín as Juan Cruz Santillán
- Andrea Bonelli as Marcela Figueroa
- Fabián Vena as Gabriel Méndez

=== Supporting ===
- Tomás Fonzi as Camilo Figueroa
- Benjamín Rojas as Nacho Carmona
- Marcelo De Bellis as Facundo Mendoza
- Julieta Nair Calvo as Renata Fuentes
- Facundo Espinosa as Martín Gómez
- Benjamín Amadeo as Tomás Álzaga
- Pilar Gamboa as Natalia
- Bárbara Lombardo as Juana Méndez
- Miriam Odorico as Amelia Duarte
- Darío Lopilato as Fausto
- Benjamín Alfonso as Antonio Hauser
- Maida Andrenacci as Silvina Mancusi
- Fernanda Metilli as Rochi Álvarez
- María Onetto as Elena Mónaco
- Christian Sancho as Fabricio Del Monte
