= Bailando por un Sueño 2008 =

- Season 2008
- The cast of Bailando por un Sueño 2008

Release
- Original network: Canal 13
- Original release: April 14 – December 11, 2008

Season chronology
- ← Previous; Bailando por un Sueño 2007 Next → Bailando Kids / El Musical de tus Sueños / Bailando 2010

Bailando por un Sueño 2008 was the fifth Argentinean season of Bailando por un Sueño.

The first show of the season aired on April 14, 2008, as part of the original show, Showmatch, broadcast on Canal 13 and hosted by Marcelo Tinelli. This time, there were 40 couples competing, and the competition lasted 35 weeks. The winner was revealed on the season finale, on December 11, 2008: the model Carolina "Pampita" Ardohaín, who was paired with the professional dancer Nicolás Armengol. This season was the first to include among the participants international celebrities such as Gabriela Bo (from Paraguay), Ilona "Cicciolina" Staller (from Italy), María Eugenia "Kenita" Larraín (from Chile) and Serafín Zubiri (from Spain).

The panel of judges had a change: Graciela Alfano left her place, and Carmen Barbieri entered to replace her. The other judges from the previous season stayed on: journalist Jorge Lafauci, comedian Moria Casán and Gerardo Sofovich.

== Couples ==
| Celebrity | Notability | Professional Partner | Status |
|---|---|---|---|
| Natacha Jaitt | Playboy host | Cristian Falcón | Eliminated 1st by the 37% |
| Ilona "Cicciolina" Staller | Porn star | – | Withdrew |
| Victoria Vanucci | Model | Eliseo Álvarez | Eliminated 2nd by the 21% |
| Adriana Aguirre | Vedette | Martín Peirano | Eliminated 3rd by the 48.2% |
| Gladys Florimonte | Comedian | Ariel Zambrano | Eliminated 4th by the 49% |
| Dolores Barreiro | Model | Pier Fritzsche | Eliminated 5th by the 42% |
| Belén Francese | Model | Diego López Pappalardo | Eliminated 6th by the 47% |
| Gabriela Bo | Model | Juan José Ávila | Eliminated 7th by the 49.3% |
| Florencia Gómez Córdoba | Model | Daniel Díaz | Eliminated 8th by the 46% |
| Verónica Varano | Actress and Television presenter | Jorge Tajomisski | Eliminated 9th by the 39% |
| Marianela Mirra | Gran Hermano 2007 winner | Carlos Cruz | Eliminated 10th by the 49.2% |
| María Eugenia "Kenita" Larraín | Model | Martín Whitencamp | Eliminated 11th by the 41% |
| Jorge Ibañez | Fashion designer | Lourdes Sánchez | Eliminated 12th by the 43% |
| Carolina Baldini | Model | Paulo Pedernera | Eliminated 13th by the 45% |
| Millie Stegman | Actress | Alejandro Gallego | Eliminated 16th by the 22% |
| Serafín Zubiri | Musician | Natalia Soledad Bollini | Eliminated 17th by the 41% |
| Fernanda Vives | Model | Adrián Díaz | Eliminated 18th by the 36.6% |
| Marcelo de Bellis | Actor | Cristhel Coopman | Eliminated 19th by the 49.6% |
| Sabrina Rojas | Model | Juan Pablo Battaglia | Eliminated 20th by the 48.7% |
| Evangelina Anderson | Model | – | Withdrew |
| Karina Jelinek | Model | Pier Fritzsche^{[d]} | Eliminated 21st by the 48.3% |
| Pablo Ruiz | Singer | Vanessa Encima Gotzl | Eliminated 22nd by the 47.7% |
| Natalia Fassi | Model | Abel Faccini | Eliminated 23rd by the 43% |
| Eliana Guercio^{[b]} | Model and Vedette | – | Withdrew |
| Claudia Fernández^{[c]} | Vedette | Julian Carvajal | Eliminated 24th by the 42.4% |
| Mariana de Melo | Vedette | Jorge Tajomisski | Eliminated 25th by the 49.7% |
| Matías Alé | TV personality | Gisela Bernal | Eliminated 26th by the 47.69% |
| Jésica Cirio | Model | Gabriel Usandivaras | Eliminated 27th by the 22.8% |
| Sofía Zámolo | Model | Lucas Heredia | Eliminated 28th by the 37.5% |
| Daniel "La Tota" Santillán | Actor and Television presenter | Virginia Dobrich | Eliminated 29th by the 49.6% |
| Mónica Farro | Vedette | Nicolás Scillama | Eliminated 30th by the 6.7% |
| Eunice Castro | Model | Carlos Bernal | Eliminated 31st by the 45.1% |
| Adabel Guerrero^{[a]} | Vedette | Joel Ledesma | Eliminated 32nd by the 14.2% |
| Marixa Balli | Vedette | Juan Pablo Battaglia | Eliminated 33rd by the 18.4% |
| María Fernanda Callejón | Actress | Rodrigo Escobar | Semi-finalists by the 48.95% |
| Valeria Archimó | Vedette | Juan Leandro Nimo | Semi-finalists by the 49.87% |
| Laura Fidalgo | Dancer | Miguel Brandón | Runners-up by the 43.76% |
| Carolina "Pampita" Ardohaín | Model | Nicolás Armengol | Winners by the 56.24% |

- ^[a] Ilona "Cicciolina" Staller left the competition, and Adabel Guerrero entered in her place.
- ^[b] Evangelina Anderson left the competition, and Eliana Guercio entered in her place.
- ^[c] Eliana Guercio left the competition, and Claudia Fernández entered in her place.
- ^[d] Lucas González was the original partner, but he left the competition after Hip-Hop's round.
- Winners of the re-entry (round 23):
  - Matías Alé & Gisela Bernal (replacing Carolina Baldini & Pablo Pedernera).
  - Adabel Guerrero & Joel Ledesma.
  - Pablo Ruiz & Vanessa Encina.
  - Marixa Balli (replacing Sabrina Rojas) & Juan Pablo Battaglia.
  - María Fernanda Callejón & Rodrigo Escobar.
  - Natalia Fassi & Abel Faccini.
  - Mariana de Melo (replacing Verónica Varano) & Jorge Tajomisski.

== Scoring chart ==
| Celebrity | Place | 01 | 02 | 03 | 04 | 05 | 06 | 07 | 08 | 09 | 10 | 11 | 12 | 13 | 14 | 15 | 16 | 17 | 18 | 19 | 20 | 21 | 22 | 23 | 24 | 25 | 26 | 27 | 28 | 29 | 30 | 31 | 32 | SF | F |
|---|---|---|---|---|---|---|---|---|---|---|---|---|---|---|---|---|---|---|---|---|---|---|---|---|---|---|---|---|---|---|---|---|---|---|---|
| Pampita | 1 | 32 | 27 | 32 | 24 | 32 | 29 | 33 | 33 | 29 | 28 | 33 | 36 | 37 | 29 | 35 | 31 | 35 | 37 | 37 | 30 | 34 | 36 | 29 | 33 | 33 | 37 | 37 | 33 | 38 | 60 | 64 | SAFE | 7 | 8 |
| Laura | 2 | 35 | 37 | 31 | 34 | 37 | 37 | 27 | 38 | 35 | 37 | 36 | 38 | 28 | 33 | 34 | 34 | 39 | 34 | * | 38 | 30 | 34 | 36 | 32 | 33 | 37 | 34 | 37 | 33 | 64^{[1]} | 58 | SAFE | 6 | 4 |
| Valeria | 4–3 | 32 | 35 | 36 | 31 | 37 | 36 | 29 | 33 | 37 | 37 | 34 | 29 | 36 | 38 | 31 | 37 | 36 | 38 | 36 | 37 | 37 | 34 | 36 | 31 | 37 | 35 | 37 | 36 | 37 | 71 | 64 | SAFE | 2 | |
| María Fernanda | 4–3 & 25 | 32 | 28 | 29 | 37 | 32 | 29 | 32 | 29 | 35 | 27 | 32 | 30 | 29 | 29 | 27 | | | | | | | | | 24 | 28 | * | 33 | 32 | 28 | 64 | 58 | SAFE | 3 | |
| Marixa | 6–5 | | | | | | | | | | | | | | | | | | | | | | | | 28 | 30 | 31 | 33 | 30 | 30 | 60 | 64 | ELIM | | |
| Adabel | 6–5 & 18 | | 32 | 30 | 34 | 33 | 33 | 28 | 28 | 31 | 30 | 36 | 33 | 28 | 37 | 37 | 37 | 37 | 29 | 31 | 36 | 31 | 29 | | 26 | 36 | 29 | 34 | 36 | 33 | 64 | 60 | ELIM | | |
| Eunice | 8–7 | 33 | 36 | 27 | 37 | 36 | 26 | 29 | 25 | 37 | 34 | 25 | 30 | 37 | 25 | 28 | 37 | 28 | 29 | 31 | 28 | 34 | 36 | 33 | 35 | 35 | 34 | 33 | 32 | 29^{[2]} | 66 | 64 | | | |
| Mónica | 8–7 | 32 | 36 | 27 | 33 | 33 | 36 | 29 | 36 | 29 | 37 | 27 | 28 | 34 | 29 | 37 | 36 | 34 | 36 | 35 | 32 | 37 | 37 | 34 | 33 | 30 | 35 | 33 | 33 | 30 | 60 | 60 | | | |
| Tota | 9 | 30 | 31 | 32 | 23 | 28 | 31 | 28 | 23 | 26 | 31 | 25 | 34 | 28 | 35 | 27 | 33 | 23 | 23 | 31 | 28 | 27 | 31 | 25 | 22 | 35 | 32 | 26 | 35 | 28 | 51 | | | | |
| Sofía | 11–10 | 27 | 26 | 26 | 26 | 29 | 34 | 26 | 27 | 29 | 30 | 27 | 37 | 34 | 33 | 27 | 32 | 24 | 29 | 34^{[1]} | 29 | * | 34 | 35 | 25 | 30 | 29 | 36 | 30 | 28 | | | | | |
| Jésica | 11–10 | 32 | 32 | 35 | 30 | 30 | 37 | 37 | 27 | 28 | 31 | 32 | 28 | 30 | 29 | 35 | 37 | 33 | 25 | 37 | 32 | 30 | 37 | 27 | 37 | 37 | 31 | 36 | 30 | 28 | | | | | |
| Matías | 12 | | | | | | | | | | | | | | | | | | | | | | | | 25 | 30 | 29 | 32 | 30 | | | | | | |
| Mariana | 13 | | | | | | | | | | | | | | | | | | | | | | | | 20 | 24 | 26 | 33 | | | | | | | |
| Claudia | 14 | | | | | | | | | | | | | | | | | | | | | | | | | 26 | 27 | | | | | | | | |
| Eliana | N/A | | | | | | | | | | | | | | | | | | | | | | | | | 26^{[3]} | | | | | | | | | |
| Natalia | 15 | 23 | 26 | 30^{[4]} | 31^{[4]} | 32^{[4]} | 37^{[4]} | 37^{[4]} | 23^{[5]} | 27^{[6]} | 37^{[4]} | 29^{[4]} | 36^{[4]} | 22 | 37 | 32 | 23 | 24 | 25 | | | | | | 25 | 26 | | | | | | | | | |
| Pablo | 16 & 26 | 28 | 35 | 27 | 33 | 37 | 35 | 30 | 26 | 32 | 35 | 24 | 24 | 33 | 25 | | | | | | | | | | 23 | | | | | | | | | | |
| Evangelina | N/A | 35 | 33 | 24 | 31 | 28 | 32 | 28 | 37 | 34 | 27 | 25 | 37 | 31 | 29 | 30 | 33 | 34 | 33 | 27 | 31 | 32 | 28 | 27 | 28 | | | | | | | | | | |
| Karina | 17 | 27 | 21 | 23 | 24 | 27 | 25 | 26 | 25 | 36 | 31 | 33 | 31 | 30 | 34 | 37 | 30 | 26 | 37^{[7]} | 36^{[7]} | 30 | 25 | 37^{[7]} | 26 | | | | | | | | | | | |
| Sabrina | 19 | 31^{[7]} | 36^{[7]} | 29^{[7]} | 32^{[7]} | 29^{[7]} | 32^{[7]} | 26 | 23 | 36 | 27 | 30 | 37 | 28 | 36 | 27 | 28 | 33 | 33 | 31 | 28 | 25 | | | | | | | | | | | | | |
| Marcelo | 20 | 22 | 27 | 26 | 24 | 30 | 27 | 21 | 23 | 23 | 24 | 32 | 30 | 29 | 29 | 30 | 30 | 24 | 22 | 20 | 28 | | | | | | | | | | | | | | |
| Fernanda | 21 | 31 | 27 | 28 | 30 | 32 | 33 | 28 | 30 | 31 | 33 | 33 | 30 | 32 | 36 | 27 | 30 | 31 | 25 | 30 | | | | | | | | | | | | | | | |
| Serafín | 23 | 24 | 26 | 35 | 27 | 37 | 37 | 28 | 29 | 28 | 28 | 32 | 25 | 37 | 37 | 27 | 37 | 24 | | | | | | | | | | | | | | | | | |
| Millie | 24 | 33 | 24 | 32 | 28 | 32 | 28 | 33 | 31^{[8]} | 29^{[8]} | 36^{[8]} | 29^{[8]} | 33^{[8]} | 32^{[8]} | 29 | 31 | 30 | | | | | | | | | | | | | | | | | | |
| Carolina | 27 | 30 | 27 | 20 | 27 | 28 | 27^{[2]} | 33^{[2]} | 35 | 32 | 26 | 25 | 29 | 22 | | | | | | | | | | | | | | | | | | | | | |
| Jorge | 28 | 27 | 28 | 33 | 27 | 31 | 25 | 37 | 23 | 31 | 30 | 30 | 28 | | | | | | | | | | | | | | | | | | | | | | |
| Kenita | 29 | 30 | 28 | 20 | 27^{[3]} | 35^{[3]} | 34^{[3]} | 29 | 37 | 27 | 27 | 24 | | | | | | | | | | | | | | | | | | | | | | | |
| Marianela | 30 | 20 | 24 | 24 | 31 | 27 | 25 | 34 | 23 | 29 | 27 | | | | | | | | | | | | | | | | | | | | | | | | |
| Verónica | 31 | 23 | 25 | 25 | 30 | 24 | 22^{[9]} | 24 | 23 | 27 | | | | | | | | | | | | | | | | | | | | | | | | | |
| Florencia | 32 | 23 | 26 | 27 | 24 | 29 | 28 | 26 | 23 | | | | | | | | | | | | | | | | | | | | | | | | | | |
| Gabriela | 33 | 25 | 24 | 25 | 20 | 34 | 27 | 26 | | | | | | | | | | | | | | | | | | | | | | | | | | | |
| Belén | 34 | 28 | 26 | 25 | 24 | 29 | 20 | | | | | | | | | | | | | | | | | | | | | | | | | | | | |
| Dolores | 35 | 26 | 30 | 29 | 28 | 25 | | | | | | | | | | | | | | | | | | | | | | | | | | | | | |
| Gladys | 36 | 25 | 29 | 20 | 24 | | | | | | | | | | | | | | | | | | | | | | | | | | | | | | |
| Adriana | 37 | 25 | 29 | 19 | | | | | | | | | | | | | | | | | | | | | | | | | | | | | | | |
| Victoria | 38 | 26 | 22 | | | | | | | | | | | | | | | | | | | | | | | | | | | | | | | | |
| Cicciolina | N/A | 22 | | | | | | | | | | | | | | | | | | | | | | | | | | | | | | | | | |
| Natacha | 39 | 22 | | | | | | | | | | | | | | | | | | | | | | | | | | | | | | | | | |

Red numbers indicate the lowest score for each week.
Green numbers indicate the highest score for each week.
indicates the couple eliminated that week.
indicates the couple was saved by the public.
indicates the couple was saved by the jury.
indicates the couple withdrew.
indicates the winning couple.
indicates the runner-up couple.
indicates the semi-finalists couples.

- Laura Fidalgo, Sofía Zámolo and María Fernanda Callejón were sentenced because they stopped their routines in the middle of the choreography, as they forgot it, but they were all saved by the judges (Laura in round 19, Sofía in round 21 and María Fernanda in round 27).
- In round 33, all the couples danced Cha-cha-cha as they were in a sentence, so there were no scores. Two couples were saved by the judges, two by the public vote, and two were eliminated.
- ^[1]replaced by Anabel Cherubito.
- ^[2]replaced by Ximena Capristo.
- ^[3]replaced by Claudia Fernández.
- ^[4]replaced by Belén Tellez.
- ^[5]replaced by Jéssica Almada.
- ^[6]replaced by Cecilia Oviedo.
- ^[7]replaced by Marixa Balli.
- ^[8]replaced by Celina Rucci.
- ^[9]replaced by Cecilia Oviedo.

=== Highest and lowest scoring performances ===
The best and worst performances in each dance according to the judges' marks are as follows:

| Dance | Best dancer(s) | Best score | Worst dancer(s) | Worst score |
|---|---|---|---|---|
| Disco | Evangelina Anderson; Laura Fidalgo | 35 | Marianela Mirra | 20 |
| Salsa | Laura Fidalgo | 37 | Karina Jelinek | 21 |
| Rock and roll | Valeria Archimó | 36 | Adriana Aguirre | 19 |
| Argentine cumbia | Eunice Castro; María Fernanda Callejón | 37 | Gabriela Bo | 20 |
| Axé music | Laura Fidalgo; Valeria Archimó; Pablo Ruiz; Serafín Zubiri | 37 | Verónica Varano | 24 |
| Hip-hop | Serafín Zubiri; Laura Fidalgo; Jesica Cirio; Natalia Fassi | 37 | Belén Francese | 20 |
| Cha-cha-cha | Jorge Ibáñez; Natalia Fassi; Jesica Cirio | 37 | Marcelo de Bellis | 20 |
| Adagio | Laura Fidalgo | 38 | Serafín Zubiri | 21 |
| Lambada | Eunice Castro; Valeria Archimó | 37 | Marcelo de Bellis | 23 |
| Reggaeton | Laura Fidalgo; Valeria Archimó; Mónica Farro; Natalia Fassi | 37 | Marcelo de Bellis | 24 |
| Latin pop | Laura Fidalgo; Adabel Guerrero | 36 | Pablo Ruiz; María Eugenia "Kenita" Larraín | 24 |
| Music video | Laura Fidalgo | 38 | Pablo Ruiz | 24 |
| Cuarteto | Serafín Zubiri; Carolina "Pampita" Ardohain; Eunice Castro | 37 | Carolina Baldini; Natalia Fassi | 22 |
| Pole dance | Valeria Archimó | 38 | Pablo Ruiz; Eunice Castro | 25 |
| Beat music | Karina Jelinek; Mónica Farro; Adabel Guerrero | 37 | Fernanda Vives; Sabrina Rojas; Serafín Zubiri; Daniel "La Tota" Santillán; Sofía Zámolo; María Fernanda Callejón | 27 |
| Arabic music | Serafín Zubiri; Jesica Cirio; Adabel Guerrero; Eunice Castro; Valeria Archimó | 37 | Natalia Fassi | 23 |
| Latin adagio | Laura Fidalgo | 39 | Daniel "La Tota" Santillán | 23 |
| Jive | Valeria Archimó | 38 | Marcelo de Bellis | 22 |
| Strip dance | Jesica Cirio; Carolina "Pampita" Ardohain | 37 | Marcelo de Bellis | 20 |
| Argentine rock | Laura Fidalgo | 38 | Marcelo de Bellis; Sabrina Rojas; Daniel "La Tota" Santillán; Eunice Castro | 28 |
| Aero dance | Valeria Archimó; Mónica Farro | 37 | Sabrina Rojas; Karina Jelinek | 25 |
| Merengue | Karina Jelinek; Jesica Cirio; Mónica Farro | 37 | Evangelina Anderson | 28 |
| Children's music | Laura Fidalgo; Valeria Archimó | 36 | Daniel "La Tota" Santillán | 25 |
| Jazz | Jesica Cirio | 37 | Mariana de Melo | 20 |
| Country music | Jesica Cirio; Valeria Archimó | 37 | Mariana de Melo | 24 |
| Divas | Laura Fidalgo; Carolina "Pampita" Ardohain | 37 | Mariana de Melo | 26 |
| Adagio from telenovelas | Valeria Archimó; Carolina "Pampita" Ardohain | 37 | Daniel "La Tota" Santillán | 26 |
| Aquadance | Laura Fidalgo | 37 | Matías Alé; Jesica Cirio; Sofía Zámolo; Marixa Balli | 30 |
| Dancing in the rain | Carolina "Pampita" Ardohain | 38 | Jesica Cirio; Sofía Zámolo; María Fernanda Callejón; Daniel "La Tota" Santillán | 28 |
| Samba Dancing in the snow | Valeria Archimó | 71 | Daniel "La Tota" Santillán | 51 |
| Pole dance Latin pop | Eunice Castro; Marixa Balli; Valeria Archimó; Carolina "Pampita" Ardohain | 64 | María Fernanda Callejón; Laura Fidalgo | 58 |

== Styles, scores and songs ==
Secret vote is in bold text.

=== April ===
Disco, Salsa and Rock and roll
| Date | Couple | Style | Song | Score | | | | Total |
| Date | Couple | Style | Song | Carmen | Jorge | Moria | Gerardo | Total |
|---|---|---|---|---|---|---|---|---|
| April 14 | Dolores & Pier | Disco | Jamiroquai – "Canned Heat" | 7 | 4 | 7 | **8** | 26 |
| April 14 | Natalia & Abel | Disco | Barry White – "You're the First, the Last, My Everything" | 7 | 2 | 8 | **6** | 23 |
| April 14 | Serafín & Natalia | Disco | Gloria Gaynor – "I Am What I Am" | 7 | 3 | 6 | **8** | 24 |
| April 14 | Sofía & Lucas | Disco | Macy Gray – "Sexual Revolution" | 8 | 4 | 8 | **7** | 27 |
| April 14 | Adriana & Martín | Disco | Gloria Gaynor – "Never Can Say Goodbye" | 7 | 4 | 7 | **7** | 25 |
| April 14 | Carolina & Paulo | Disco | Thelma Houston – "Don't Leave Me This Way" | 8 | 5 | 9 | **8** | 30 |
| April 14 | Evangelina & Julián | Disco | The Trammps – "Disco Inferno" | 10 | 6 | 10 | **9** | 35 |
| April 15 | Cicciolina & Joel | Disco | Gloria Gaynor – "I Will Survive" | 6 | 3 | 6 | **7** | 22 |
| April 15 | Karina & Lucas | Disco | Alicia Bridges – "I Love the Nightlife" | 7 | 4 | 8 | **8** | 27 |
| April 15 | Belén & Diego | Disco | Michael Jackson – "Don't Stop 'Till You Get Enough" | 8 | 5 | 8 | **7** | 28 |
| April 15 | Millie & Alejandro | Disco | Scissors Sisters – "I Don't Feel Like Dancin'" | 9 | 5 | 9 | **10** | 33 |
| April 15 | Marianela & Carlos | Disco | Michael Jackson – "Blame It on the Boogie" | 5 | 2 | 6 | **7** | 20 |
| April 17 | Pampita & Nicolás | Disco | Donna Summer – "Last Dance" | 10 | 5 | 9 | **8** | 32 |
| April 17 | Jesica & Gabriel | Disco | Frankie Valli – "I Love You Baby" | 10 | 4 | 9 | **9** | 32 |
| April 17 | Eunice & Carlos | Disco | ABBA – "Voulez-Vous" | 9 | 6 | 9 | **9** | 33 |
| April 17 | Gladys & Ariel | Disco | Donna Summer – "Hot Stuff" | 7 | 4 | 7 | **7** | 25 |
| April 18 | Pablo & Vanessa | Disco | Village People – "Macho Man" | 8 | 4 | 8 | **8** | 28 |
| April 18 | Mónica & Nicolás | Disco | Kool & the Gang – "Celebration" | 9 | 5 | 9 | **9** | 32 |
| April 18 | Natacha & Cristian | Disco | Bee Gees – "Tragedy" | 7 | 3 | 6 | **6** | 22 |
| April 18 | Jorge & María Lourdes | Disco | Bee Gees – "You Should Be Dancing" | 7 | 4 | 8 | **8** | 27 |
| April 18 | Laura & Miguel | Disco | Beyoncé – "One Night Only" | 10 | 6 | 10 | **9** | 35 |
| April 18 | Valeria & Juan Leandro | Disco | Madonna – "Hung Up" | 9 | 5 | 9 | **9** | 32 |
| April 18 | Marcelo & Cristhel | Disco | Village People – "YMCA" | 5 | 2 | 8 | **7** | 22 |
| April 21 | Kenita & Martín | Disco | Kym Mazelle – "Young Hearts Run Free" | 7 | 5 | 9 | **9** | 30 |
| April 21 | Gabriela & Juan José | Disco | Earth, Wind & Fire – "September" | 7 | 4 | 7 | **7** | 25 |
| April 21 | Verónica & Jorge | Disco | Sister Sledge – "We Are Family" | 6 | 3 | 7 | **7** | 23 |
| April 21 | María Fernanda & Rodrigo | Disco | Donna Summer – "On the Radio" | 8 | 6 | 9 | **9** | 32 |
| April 21 | Tota & Virginia | Disco | Electric Light Orchestra – "Last Train to London" | 9 | 4 | 9 | **8** | 30 |
| April 21 | Fernanda & Adrián | Disco | Cher – "Strong Enough" | 9 | 5 | 9 | **8** | 31 |
| April 21 | Victoria & Eliseo | Disco | Laura Branigan – "Gloria" | 8 | 4 | 7 | **7** | 26 |
| April 21 | Florencia & Daniel | Disco | Madonna – "Sorry" | 7 | 3 | 7 | **6** | 23 |
| April 21 | Marixa & Juan Pablo | Disco | Earth, Wind & Fire – "Boogie Wonderland" | 9 | 5 | 8 | **9** | 31 |
| April 22 | Sofía & Lucas | Salsa | La Charanga Habanera – "Por Amarte Así" | 8 | 4 | **7** | 7 | 26 |
| April 22 | Jesica & Gabriel | Salsa | Celia Cruz – "Quimbara" | 9 | 6 | **9** | 8 | 32 |
| April 24 | Evangelina & Julián | Salsa | Dark Latin Groove – "Atrévete (No Puedes Conmigo)" | 9 | 6 | **9** | 9 | 33 |
| April 24 | Millie & Alejandro | Salsa | Dark Latin Groove – "La Quiero A Morir" | 7 | 3 | **7** | 7 | 24 |
| April 24 | Pablo & Vanessa | Salsa | Marc Anthony – "Valió la Pena" | 10 | 6 | **10** | 9 | 35 |
| April 24 | Jorge & María Lourdes | Salsa | Oscar D'León – "Cielito Lindo" | 8 | 4 | **8** | 8 | 28 |
| April 24 | Pampita & Nicolás | Salsa | Gilberto Santa Rosa – "Déjate Querer" | 8 | 4 | **8** | 7 | 27 |
| April 24 | María Fernanda & Rodrigo | Salsa | Celia Cruz – "Azúcar Negra" | 7 | 4 | **9** | 8 | 28 |
| April 24 | Serafín & Natalia | Salsa | Gilberto Santa Rosa – "La Agarro Bajando" | 7 | 4 | **7** | 8 | 26 |
| April 24 | Belén & Diego | Salsa | Los Van Van – "Temba, Tumba y Timba" | 7 | 5 | **7** | 7 | 26 |
| April 24 | Gabriela & Juan José | Salsa | Olga Tañón – "Hoy Quiero Confesarme" | 7 | 3 | **7** | 7 | 24 |
| April 25 | Marianela & Carlos | Salsa | José Alberto "El Canario" – "Me Dejó Picao" | 7 | 4 | **6** | 7 | 24 |
| April 25 | Fernanda & Adrián | Salsa | George Lamond – "Si Te Vas" | 7 | 4 | **9** | 7 | 27 |
| April 25 | Karina & Lucas | Salsa | Chichí Peralta – "Procura" | 5 | 2 | **6** | 8 | 21 |
| April 25 | Natalia & Abel | Salsa | Oscar D'León and José Alberto "El Canario" – "Llegó El Sabor" | 7 | 4 | **8** | 7 | 26 |
| April 25 | Mónica & Nicolás | Salsa | Celia Cruz – "Yo Viviré" | 10 | 6 | **10** | 10 | 36 |
| April 25 | Eunice & Carlos | Salsa | Gloria Estefan – "Mi Tierra" | 10 | 6 | **10** | 10 | 36 |
| April 25 | Adriana & Martín | Salsa | Celia Cruz – "Sazón" | 9 | 5 | **7** | 8 | 29 |
| April 25 | Victoria & Eliseo | Salsa | Frankie Negrón – "No Me Compares" | 6 | 3 | **6** | 7 | 22 |
| April 25 | Valeria & Juan Leandro | Salsa | Sexappeal – "La Llorona" | 10 | 6 | **9** | 10 | 35 |
| April 25 | Gladys & Ariel | Salsa | Celia Cruz – "Que Le Den Candela" | 8 | 5 | **7** | 9 | 29 |
| April 25 | Adabel & Joel | Salsa | Celia Cruz – "La Vida Es Un Carnaval" | 9 | 4 | **9** | 10 | 32 |
| April 28 | Kenita & Martín | Salsa | Yuri Buenaventura – "Rueda de Casino" | 8 | 4 | **8** | 8 | 28 |
| April 28 | Dolores & Pier | Salsa | Gloria Estefan and Celia Cruz – "Tres Gotas De Agua Bendita" | 8 | 5 | **8** | 9 | 30 |
| April 28 | Verónica & Jorge | Salsa | Tony Vega – "Déjame Soñar" | 7 | 4 | **7** | 7 | 25 |
| April 28 | Tota & Virginia | Salsa | Tito Nieves – "La Salsa Vive" | 9 | 5 | **9** | 8 | 31 |
| April 28 | Marcelo & Cristhel | Salsa | Willy Chrinino – "Soy Güajiro" | 7 | 4 | **8** | 8 | 27 |
| April 28 | Carolina & Paula | Salsa | Charlie Cruz – "Bombón de Azúcar" | 8 | 4 | **8** | 7 | 27 |
| April 28 | Marixa & Juan Pablo | Salsa | Marc Anthony and La India – "Vivir lo Nuestro" | 10 | 6 | **10** | 10 | 36 |
| April 28 | Florencia & Daniel | Salsa | Yuri Buenaventura – "Mala Vida" | 7 | 4 | **8** | 7 | 26 |
| April 28 | Laura & Miguel | Salsa | Dark Latin Groove – "Acuyuyé" | 10 | 7 | **10** | 10 | 37 |
| April 29 | María Fernanda & Rodrigo | Rock and roll | Elvis Presley – "Blue Suede Shoes" | 8 | **5** | 9 | 7 | 29 |
| April 29 | Valeria & Juan Leandro | Rock and roll | Kenny Loggins – "Footloose" | 10 | **6** | 10 | 10 | 36 |
| April 29 | Evangelina & Julián | Rock and roll | Elvis Presley – "Hard Headed Woman" | 7 | **3** | 7 | 7 | 24 |
| April 29 | Mónica & Nicolás | Rock and roll | Chuck Berry – "Carol" | 8 | **4** | 8 | 7 | 27 |
| April 29 | Pablo & Vanessa | Rock and roll | | 7 | **4** | 8 | 8 | 27 |

- From April 22 to 28 Gerardo Sofovich was replaced by actor and comedian Antonio Gasalla, who scored the remaining couples in the competition.

=== May ===
Rock and roll, Argentine cumbia, Axé music, Hip-hop and Cha-cha-cha
| Date | Couple | Style | Song | Score | | | | Total |
| Date | Couple | Style | Song | Carmen | Jorge | Moria | Gerardo | Total |
|---|---|---|---|---|---|---|---|---|
| May 1 | Jesica & Gabriel | Rock and roll | Sha Na Na – "Rock 'n' Roll Is Here to Stay" | 10 | **6** | 9 | 10 | 35 |
| May 1 | Eunice & Carlos | Rock and roll | Little Richard – "Johnny Be Good" | 8 | **4** | 8 | 7 | 27 |
| May 1 | Pampita & Nicolás | Rock and roll | Elvis Presley – "Jailhouse Rock" | 10 | **5** | 9 | 8 | 32 |
| May 1 | Sofía & Lucas | Rock and roll | John Travolta – "Grease Lightning" | 8 | **4** | 7 | 7 | 26 |
| May 1 | Adriana & Martín | Rock and roll | Bill Haley & His Comets – "See You Later, Alligator" | 5 | **3** | 5 | 6 | 19 |
| May 1 | Jorge & María Lourdes | Rock and roll | Brian Setzer – "Flying Saucer Rock'n'Roll" | 10 | **5** | 9 | 9 | 33 |
| May 1 | Serafín & Natalia | Rock and roll | Little Richard – "Long Tall Sally" | 10 | **5** | 10 | 10 | 35 |
| May 1 | Millie & Alejandro | Rock and roll | Elvis Presley – "All Shook Up" | 9 | **6** | 9 | 8 | 32 |
| May 2 | Belén F. & Diego | Rock and roll | Grease 2 – "Rock-A-Hula-Luau (Summer Is Coming)" | 7 | **4** | 7 | 7 | 25 |
| May 2 | Fernanda & Adrián | Rock and roll | Tina Turner – "Proud Mary" | 8 | **4** | 8 | 8 | 28 |
| May 2 | Adabel & Joel | Rock and roll | Little Richard – "Good Golly Miss Molly" | 9 | **5** | 8 | 8 | 30 |
| May 2 | Karina & Lucas | Rock and roll | Stray Cats – "(She's) Sexy + 17" | 7 | **3** | 6 | 7 | 23 |
| May 2 | Florencia & Daniel | Rock and roll | The Beatles – "Rock and Roll Music" | 8 | **5** | 7 | 7 | 27 |
| May 2 | Marianela & Carlos | Rock and roll | Jerry Lee Lewis – "Rock And Roll" | 7 | **4** | 7 | 6 | 24 |
| May 2 | Belén T. & Abel | Rock and roll | Creedence Clearwater Revival – "Travelin' Band" | 9 | **5** | 8 | 8 | 30 |
| May 2 | Laura & Miguel | Rock and roll | Creedence Clearwater Revival – "Bad Moon Rising" | 9 | **5** | 8 | 9 | 31 |
| May 2 | Gladys & Ariel | Rock and roll | | 6 | **2** | 6 | 6 | 20 |
| May 5 | Carolina & Paulo | Rock and roll | Bill Haley & His Comets – "Rock Around the Clock" | 6 | **3** | 5 | 6 | 20 |
| May 5 | Kenita & Martín | Rock and roll | Little Richard – "Tutti Frutti" | 5 | **3** | 5 | 7 | 20 |
| May 5 | Tota & Virginia | Rock and roll | Elvis Presley – "(Let Me Be Your) Teddy Bear" | 9 | **6** | 8 | 9 | 32 |
| May 5 | Marixa & Juan Pablo | Rock and roll | Stevie Ray Vaughan and Double Trouble – "The House Is Rockin'" | 8 | **5** | 8 | 8 | 29 |
| May 5 | Verónica & Jorge | Rock and roll | Queen – "Crazy Little Thing Called Love" | 7 | **4** | 7 | 7 | 25 |
| May 5 | Dolores & Pier | Rock and roll | Elvis Presley – "Hound Dog" | 7 | **5** | 8 | 9 | 29 |
| May 5 | Marcelo & Cristhel | Rock and roll | Elvis Presley – "Don't Be Cruel" | 7 | **5** | 8 | 6 | 26 |
| May 5 | Gabriela & Juan José | Rock and roll | Jerry Lee Lewis – "Great Balls of Fire" | 7 | **4** | 8 | 6 | 25 |
| May 6 | Evangelina & Julián | Argentine cumbia | Néstor En Bloque – "Una Calle Me Separa" | **10** | 5 | 8 | 8 | 31 |
| May 6 | Pablo & Vanessa | Argentine cumbia | Ráfaga – "Mentirosa" | **9** | 6 | 9 | 9 | 33 |
| May 6 | Mónica & Nicolás | Argentine cumbia | Lía Crucet – "Cumbia Apretadita" | **9** | 5 | 9 | 10 | 33 |
| May 8 | María Fernanda & Rodrigo | Argentine cumbia | Aniceto Molina – "Negra Caderona" | **10** | 7 | 10 | 10 | 37 |
| May 8 | Sofía & Lucas | Argentine cumbia | Volcán – "Esa Malvada" | **7** | 4 | 8 | 7 | 26 |
| May 8 | Dolores & Pier | Argentine cumbia | Los Palmeras – "Bombón Asesino" | **8** | 4 | 8 | 8 | 28 |
| May 8 | Karina & Lucas | Argentine cumbia | Gladys La Bomba Tucumana – "La Pollera Amarilla" | **7** | 3 | 7 | 7 | 24 |
| May 8 | Serafín & Natalia | Argentine cumbia | Sombras – "Pega la Vuelta" | **8** | 4 | 8 | 7 | 27 |
| May 8 | Claudia & Martín | Argentine cumbia | Volcán – "Tonta" | **7** | 4 | 8 | 8 | 27 |
| May 8 | Belén T. & Abel | Argentine cumbia | Antonio Rios – "Nunca Me Faltes" | **9** | 5 | 9 | 8 | 31 |
| May 9 | Jesica & Gabriel | Argentine cumbia | Damas Gratis – "Se Te Ve la Tanga" | **9** | 4 | 8 | 9 | 30 |
| May 9 | Belén F. & Diego | Argentine cumbia | Gilda – "No Me Arrepiento de Este Amor" | **7** | 3 | 7 | 7 | 24 |
| May 9 | Eunice & Carlos | Argentine cumbia | Ráfaga – "Luna" | **10** | 7 | 10 | 10 | 37 |
| May 9 | Jorge & María Lourdes | Argentine cumbia | Los Palmeras – "Que Quiere la Chola" | **8** | 4 | 8 | 7 | 27 |
| May 9 | Valeria & Juan Leandro | Argentine cumbia | Ráfaga – "Agüita" | **8** | 5 | 9 | 9 | 31 |
| May 9 | Laura & Miguel | Argentine cumbia | Los Charros – "La Pollera Colora" | **10** | 6 | 9 | 9 | 34 |
| May 9 | Gladys & Ariel | Argentine cumbia | Gilda – "Se Me Ha Perdido Un Corazón" | **7** | 3 | 8 | 6 | 24 |
| May 9 | Adabel & Joel | Argentine cumbia | La Cumbia – "Porque Te Amo" | **10** | 5 | 9 | 10 | 34 |
| May 9 | Gabriela & Juan José | Argentine cumbia | Los Charros – "Amores Como El Nuestro" | **6** | 2 | 6 | 6 | 20 |
| May 9 | Florencia & Daniel | Argentine cumbia | Los Chakales – "Vete de Mi Lado" | **6** | 3 | 8 | 7 | 24 |
| May 9 | Millie & Alejandro | Argentine cumbia | Ráfaga – "Ritmo Caliente" | **8** | 4 | 8 | 8 | 28 |
| May 12 | Pampita & Nicolás | Argentine cumbia | Ráfaga – "Una Rafaga de Amor" | **7** | 3 | 7 | 7 | 24 |
| May 12 | Tota & Virginia | Argentine cumbia | Sombras – "La Ventanita" | **7** | 3 | 6 | 7 | 23 |
| May 12 | Fernanda & Adrián | Argentine cumbia | Gilda – "Fuiste" | **8** | 5 | 9 | 8 | 30 |
| May 12 | Marixa & Juan Pablo | Argentine cumbia | Lía Crucet – "La Güera Salomé" | **9** | 6 | 9 | 8 | 32 |
| May 12 | Marianela & Carlos | Argentine cumbia | Ráfaga – "Noche de Estrellas" | **9** | 5 | 9 | 8 | 31 |
| May 12 | Carolina & Paulo | Argentine cumbia | Gilda – "Corazón Valiente" | **8** | 4 | 7 | 8 | 27 |
| May 12 | Marcelo & Cristhel | Argentine cumbia | Amar Azul – "Yo Me Enamoré" | **7** | 3 | 8 | 6 | 24 |
| May 12 | Verónica & Jorge | Argentine cumbia | Los Palmeras – "Dame Un Beso" | **9** | 5 | 8 | 8 | 30 |
| May 13 | Eunice & Carlos | Axé music | Carrapicho – "Tic, Tic Tac" | 9 | 7 | 10 | **10** | 36 |
| May 13 | Pablo & Vanessa | Axé music | Café con Leche – "Picaflor" | 10 | 7 | 10 | **10** | 37 |
| May 15 | Pampita & Nicolás | Axé music | Tchakabum – "Dança da Maoçinha" | 9 | 5 | 9 | **9** | 32 |
| May 15 | Evangelina & Julián | Axé music | É o Tchan! – "Ralando O Tchan (A Dança Do Ventre)" | 8 | 4 | 8 | **8** | 28 |
| May 15 | María Fernanda & Rodrigo | Axé music | Asa de Águia – "Desejo de Amar" | 9 | 5 | 9 | **9** | 32 |
| May 15 | Belén F. & Diego | Axé music | Terra Samba – "Cabeçinha" | 8 | 4 | 9 | **8** | 29 |
| May 15 | Claudia & Martín | Axé music | É o Tchan! – "Turma do Batente" | 10 | 6 | 9 | **10** | 35 |
| May 15 | Serafín & Natalia | Axé music | É o Tchan! – "Bambolê" | 10 | 7 | 10 | **10** | 37 |
| May 15 | Marixa & Juan Pablo | Axé music | É o Tchan! – "Segure o Tchan" | 9 | 4 | 8 | **8** | 29 |
| May 15 | Millie & Alejandro | Axé music | Asa de Águia – "Dança da Manivela" | 9 | 6 | 9 | **8** | 32 |
| May 15 | Belén T. & Abel | Axé music | Terra Samba – "Na Manteiga" | 10 | 5 | 9 | **9** | 32 |
| May 16 | Mónica & Nicolás | Axé music | | 10 | 5 | 9 | **9** | 33 |
| May 16 | Laura & Miguel | Axé music | Margareth Menezes – "Dandalunda" | 10 | 7 | 10 | **10** | 37 |
| May 16 | Valeria & Juan Leandro | Axé music | Terra Samba – "Treme Terra" | 10 | 7 | 10 | **10** | 37 |
| May 16 | Jorge & María Lourdes | Axé music | Terra Samba – "Chiqui Chiqui Bom" | 9 | 5 | 8 | **9** | 31 |
| May 16 | Jesica & Gabriel | Axé music | É o Tchan! – "Na Boquinha da Garrafa" | 8 | 5 | 9 | **8** | 30 |
| May 16 | Marianela & Carlos | Axé music | É o Tchan! – "Disque Tchan (Alô Tchan)" | 8 | 4 | 7 | **8** | 27 |
| May 16 | Adabel & Joel | Axé music | Tchakabum – "Tesouro de Pirata" | 10 | 5 | 9 | **9** | 33 |
| May 16 | Florencia & Daniel | Axé music | | 9 | 4 | 8 | **8** | 29 |
| May 16 | Verónica & Jorge | Axé music | Cheiro de Amor – "A Dança da Sensual" | 7 | 3 | 7 | **7** | 24 |
| May 19 | Dolores & Pier | Axé music | É o Tchan! – "A Dança Do Bom Bom" | 7 | 4 | 7 | **7** | 25 |
| May 19 | Karina & Lucas | Axé music | Guigui Gueto – "Quem É Que Balança O Povo" | 7 | 4 | 8 | **8** | 27 |
| May 19 | Tota & Virginia | Axé music | É o Tchan! – "Festa Do Passa Mão" | 8 | 4 | 9 | **7** | 28 |
| May 19 | Fernanda & Adrián | Axé music | | 10 | 5 | 9 | **8** | 32 |
| May 19 | Sofía & Lucas | Axé music | É o Tchan! – "Quebradeira" | 8 | 5 | 8 | **8** | 29 |
| May 19 | Carolina & Paulo | Axé music | Asa de Águia – "Dança do Vampiro" | 8 | 4 | 8 | **8** | 28 |
| May 19 | Gabriela & Juan José | Axé music | Companhia do Pagode – "Dança do Canguru" | 10 | 6 | 9 | **9** | 34 |
| May 19 | Marcelo & Cristhel | Axé music | | 9 | 5 | 9 | **7** | 30 |
| May 20 | Eunice & Carlos | Hip-hop | Pussycat Dolls – "Don't Cha" | 8 | 4 | **7** | 7 | 26 |
| May 20 | Pablo & Vanessa | Hip-hop | Backstreet Boys – "Get Another Boyfriend" | 10 | 6 | **9** | 10 | 35 |
| May 22 | Belén F. & Diego | Hip-hop | Jennifer Lopez – "Get Right" | 5 | 3 | **6** | 6 | 20 |
| May 22 | Pampita & Nicolás | Hip-hop | The Black Eyed Peas – "Let's Get Started" | 8 | 4 | **8** | 9 | 29 |
| May 22 | Marixa & Juan Pablo | Hip-hop | Beyoncé featuring Jay-Z – "Crazy in Love" | 9 | 5 | **9** | 9 | 32 |
| May 22 | Claudia & Martín | Hip-hop | No Doubt – "Hey Baby" | 9 | 6 | **9** | 10 | 34 |
| May 22 | Marianela & Carlos | Hip-hop | Five – "If Ya Gettin' Down" | 7 | 4 | **7** | 7 | 25 |
| May 22 | Serafín & Natalia | Hip-hop | Backstreet Boys – "Everybody (Backstreet's Back)" | 10 | 7 | **10** | 10 | 37 |
| May 22 | Mónica & Nicolás | Hip-hop | Christina Aguilera – "Ain't No Other Man" | 10 | 6 | **10** | 10 | 36 |
| May 22 | Belén T. & Abel | Hip-hop | Christina Aguilera – "Dirrty" | 10 | 7 | **10** | 10 | 37 |
| May 23 | Evangelina & Julián | Hip-hop | Britney Spears – "...Baby One More Time" | 10 | 5 | **9** | 8 | 32 |
| May 23 | Laura & Miguel | Hip-hop | Jennifer Lopez – "Do It Well" | 10 | 7 | **10** | 10 | 37 |
| May 23 | Jorge & María Lourdes | Hip-hop | N'Sync – "Pop" | 7 | 3 | **7** | 8 | 25 |
| May 23 | Jesica & Gabriel | Hip-hop | Britney Spears – "Overprotected" | 10 | 7 | **10** | 10 | 37 |
| May 23 | Sofía & Lucas | Hip-hop | Destiny's Child – "Lose My Breath" | 10 | 6 | **9** | 9 | 34 |
| May 23 | María Fernanda & Rodrigo | Hip-hop | Janet Jackson – "Feedback" | 9 | 5 | **8** | 7 | 29 |
| May 23 | Adabel & Joel | Hip-hop | Justin Timberlake – "SexyBack" | 10 | 6 | **9** | 8 | 33 |
| May 23 | Florencia & Daniel | Hip-hop | Backstreet Boys – "Larger than Life" | 8 | 4 | **8** | 8 | 28 |
| May 23 | Millie & Alejandro | Hip-hop | Madonna – "Music" | 9 | 4 | **8** | 7 | 28 |
| May 26 | Ximena & Paulo | Hip-hop | Britney Spears – "Do Somethin'" | 7 | 4 | **8** | 8 | 27 |
| May 26 | Valeria & Juan Leandro | Hip-hop | The Black Eyed Peas – "Pump It" | 10 | 7 | **10** | 9 | 36 |
| May 26 | Tota & Virginia | Hip-hop | Usher featuring Lil' Jon and Ludacris – "Yeah!" | 9 | 5 | **8** | 9 | 31 |
| May 26 | Fernanda & Adrián | Hip-hop | Britney Spears – "I'm a Slave 4 U" | 9 | 6 | **9** | 9 | 33 |
| May 26 | Cecilia & Jorge | Hip-hop | Beyoncé featuring Jay-Z – "Déjà Vu" | 6 | 3 | **7** | 6 | 22 |
| May 26 | Karina & Lucas | Hip-hop | Britney Spears – "Oops!... I Did It Again" | 7 | 4 | **7** | 7 | 25 |
| May 26 | Marcelo & Cristhel | Hip-hop | Backstreet Boys – "Get Down (You're the One for Me)" | 9 | 5 | **8** | 5 | 27 |
| May 26 | Gabriela & Juan José | Hip-hop | Madonna featuring Justin Timberlake and Timbaland – "4 Minutes" | 8 | 4 | **7** | 8 | 27 |
| May 27 | Pablo & Vanessa | Cha-cha-cha | Luis Miguel – "La Última Noche" | 8 | 4 | 8 | **10** | 30 |
| May 27 | Evangelina & Julián | Cha-cha-cha | Mimí Maura – "Yo No Lloro Mas" | 8 | 5 | 8 | **7** | 28 |
| May 27 | Belén & Abel | Cha-cha-cha | Rey Ruiz – "Ay Mujer!" | 10 | 7 | 10 | **10** | 37 |
| May 27 | Millie & Alejandro | Cha-cha-cha | Caetano Veloso – "Capullito de Alelí" | 9 | 6 | 9 | **9** | 33 |
| May 29 | Pampita & Nicolás | Cha-cha-cha | Pussycat Dolls – "Sway" | 9 | 6 | 9 | **9** | 33 |
| May 29 | Jesica & Gabriel | Cha-cha-cha | Christina Aguilera – "Falsas esperanzas" | 10 | 7 | 10 | **10** | 37 |
| May 29 | Serafín & Natalia | Cha-cha-cha | La Mosca – "Cha Cha Cha" | 8 | 4 | 8 | **8** | 28 |
| May 29 | Sofía & Lucas | Cha-cha-cha | Chayanne and Jennifer Lopez – "Dame" | 7 | 4 | 7 | **8** | 26 |
| May 29 | Adabel & Joel | Cha-cha-cha | Thalía – "Menta y Canela" | 8 | 5 | 8 | **7** | 28 |
| May 30 | Kenita & Martín | Cha-cha-cha | Celia Cruz – "Rie y Llora" | 8 | 5 | 8 | **8** | 29 |
| May 30 | Laura & Miguel | Cha-cha-cha | Thalía – "Echa Pa' Lante" | 8 | 4 | 8 | **7** | 27 |
| May 30 | Valeria & Juan Leandro | Cha-cha-cha | Marc Anthony – "I Need to Know" | 9 | 5 | 8 | **7** | 29 |
| May 30 | Jorge & María Lourdes | Cha-cha-cha | Rubén Rada – "Cha, Cha Muchacha" | 10 | 7 | 10 | **10** | 37 |
| May 30 | María Fernanda & Rodrigo | Cha-cha-cha | Dark Latin Groove – "Got A Hook on You (DLG Blues)" | 9 | 6 | 9 | **8** | 32 |
| May 30 | Marcelo & Cristhel | Cha-cha-cha | Emmanuel – "El Bodeguero" | 7 | 2 | 5 | **7** | 21 |
| May 30 | Mónica & Nicolás | Cha-cha-cha | Jennifer Lopez – "Let's Get Loud" | 8 | 4 | 9 | **8** | 29 |
| May 30 | Fernanda & Adrián | Cha-cha-cha | Michael Stuart – "Déjala Que Baile" | 8 | 5 | 8 | **7** | 28 |
| May 30 | Florencia & Daniel | Cha-cha-cha | El Gran Combo de Puerto Rico – "Mala Mujer" | 7 | 4 | 7 | **8** | 26 |

=== June ===
Cha-cha-cha, Adagio, Lambada, Reggaeton and Latin pop
| Date | Couple | Style | Song | Score | | | | Total |
| Date | Couple | Style | Song | Carmen | Jorge | Moria | Gerardo | Total |
|---|---|---|---|---|---|---|---|---|
| June 2 | Eunice & Carlos | Cha-cha-cha | Ricky Martin – "Amor" | 8 | 4 | 8 | **9** | 29 |
| June 2 | Ximena & Paulo | Cha-cha-cha | Son by Four – "Sofía" | 9 | 6 | 9 | **9** | 33 |
| June 2 | Tota & Virginia | Cha-cha-cha | Celia Cruz – "Oye Como Va" | 8 | 5 | 8 | **7** | 28 |
| June 2 | Marianela & Carlos | Cha-cha-cha | Marcela Morelo featuring Bahiano – "Para Toda la Vida" | 10 | 6 | 9 | **9** | 34 |
| June 2 | Sabrina & Juan Pablo | Cha-cha-cha | Santana featuring Maná – "Corazón espinado" | 7 | 4 | 7 | **8** | 26 |
| June 2 | Verónica & Jorge | Cha-cha-cha | Rey Ruiz – "Muévelo" | 7 | 3 | 7 | **7** | 24 |
| June 2 | Karina & Pier | Cha-cha-cha | Ana Belén – "Derroche" | 7 | 4 | 7 | **8** | 26 |
| June 2 | Gabriela & Juan José | Cha-cha-cha | Celia Cruz – "Las Muchachas del Cha-Cha-Cha" | 7 | 4 | 7 | **8** | 26 |
| June 3 | Adabel & Joel | Adagio | Michael Bolton – "When a Man Loves a Woman" | **8** | 4 | 8 | 8 | 28 |
| June 3 | Jesica & Gabriel | Adagio | Wham! – "Careless Whisper" | **7** | 5 | 7 | 8 | 27 |
| June 3 | Kenita & Martín | Adagio | Laura Branigan – "The Power of Love" | **10** | 7 | 10 | 10 | 37 |
| June 5 | Pampita & Nicolás | Adagio | The Righteous Brothers – "Unchained Melody" | **9** | 5 | 9 | 10 | 33 |
| June 5 | Mónica & Nicolás | Adagio | Phill Collins – "You'll Be in My Heart" | **10** | 6 | 10 | 10 | 36 |
| June 5 | Serafín & Natalia | Adagio | Lionel Richie – "Hello" | **8** | 4 | 7 | 10 | 29 |
| June 6 | Laura & Miguel | Adagio | Air Supply – "Without You" | **10** | 8 | 10 | 10 | 38 |
| June 6 | Valeria & Juan Leandro | Adagio | Celine Dion – "All by Myself" | **9** | 6 | 8 | 10 | 33 |
| June 6 | Pablo & Vanessa | Adagio | Scorpions – "Still Loving You" | **7** | 3 | 7 | 9 | 26 |
| June 6 | Eunice & Carlos | Adagio | Whitney Houston – "I Will Always Love You" | **7** | 4 | 7 | 7 | 25 |
| June 6 | María Fernanda & Rodrigo | Adagio | Bryan Adams – "(Everything I Do) I Do It for You" | **8** | 5 | 8 | 8 | 29 |
| June 6 | Jorge & María Lourdes | Adagio | Joe Cocker and Jennifer Warnes – "Up Where We Belong" | **6** | 3 | 6 | 8 | 23 |
| June 6 | Karina & Pier | Adagio | Air Supply – "All Out of Love" | **7** | 4 | 7 | 7 | 25 |
| June 6 | Jessica A. & Abel | Adagio | Melissa Manchester – "Through the Eyes of Love" | **6** | 3 | 7 | 7 | 23 |
| June 6 | Marianela & Carlos | Adagio | Lionel Richie – "Say You, Say Me" | **6** | 4 | 6 | 7 | 23 |
| June 6 | Florencia & Daniel | Adagio | Chris de Burgh – "The Lady in Red" | **6** | 4 | 6 | 7 | 23 |
| June 9 | Evangelina & Julián | Adagio | Celine Dion – "My Heart Will Go On" | **10** | 7 | 10 | 10 | 37 |
| June 9 | Sabrina & Juan Pablo | Adagio | Glen Medeiros – "Nothing's Gonna Change My Love for You" | **7** | 3 | 7 | 6 | 23 |
| June 9 | Tota & Virginia | Adagio | Simple Red – "If You Don't Know Me by Now" | **8** | 4 | 8 | 5 | 23 |
| June 9 | Fernanda & Adrián | Adagio | Roxette – "Listen to Your Heart" | **8** | 5 | 9 | 8 | 30 |
| June 9 | Carolina & Paulo | Adagio | Bonnie Tyler – "Total Eclipse of the Heart" | **9** | 6 | 10 | 10 | 35 |
| June 9 | Sofía & Lucas | Adagio | Europe – "Carrie" | **7** | 5 | 8 | 7 | 27 |
| June 9 | Celina & Alejandro | Adagio | Elvis Costello – "She" | **9** | 5 | 9 | 8 | 31 |
| June 9 | Marcelo & Cristhel | Adagio | Jim Diamond – "I Should Have Known Better" | **6** | 2 | 6 | 9 | 23 |
| June 9 | Verónica & Jorge | Adagio | A-ha – "Crying in the Rain" | **6** | 4 | 7 | 6 | 23 |
| June 12 | Pampita & Nicolás | Lambada | Kaoma – "Jambé Finète (Grille)" | 7 | 4 | 9 | **9** | 29 |
| June 12 | Jorge & María Lourdes | Lambada | Kaoma – "Chorando Se Foi" | 8 | 6 | 8 | **9** | 31 |
| June 12 | Marianela & Carlos | Lambada | Arrow – "Groove Master" | 7 | 5 | 9 | **8** | 29 |
| June 12 | Pablo & Vanessa | Lambada | Kaoma – "Dançando Lambada" | 8 | 5 | 9 | **9** | 32 |
| June 12 | Karina & Pier | Lambada | Kaoma – "Moço do Dende" | 10 | 6 | 10 | **10** | 36 |
| June 12 | María Fernanda & Rodrigo | Lambada | Kaoma – "Dança Tago Mago" | 10 | 7 | 9 | **9** | 35 |
| June 12 | Adabel & Joel | Lambada | Kaoma – "Lamba Caribe" | 10 | 5 | 8 | **8** | 31 |
| June 12 | Sofía & Lucas | Lambada | Beto Barbosa – "Haja Amor" | 8 | 4 | 9 | **8** | 29 |
| June 13 | Laura & Miguel | Lambada | Kaoma – "Mélodie d'Amour" | 9 | 6 | 10 | **10** | 35 |
| June 13 | Valeria & Juan Leandro | Lambada | Arrow – "Groove Master" | 10 | 7 | 10 | **10** | 37 |
| June 13 | Eunice & Carlos | Lambada | Kaoma – "Dança Tago Mago" | 10 | 7 | 10 | **10** | 37 |
| June 13 | Mónica & Nicolás | Lambada | Francky Vincent – "Fruit de la Passion" | 7 | 4 | 9 | **9** | 29 |
| June 13 | Kenita & Martín | Lambada | Beto Barbosa – "Adoçica" | 7 | 3 | 9 | **8** | 27 |
| June 13 | Jesica & Gabriel | Lambada | Kaoma – "Lambamor" | 8 | 4 | 8 | **8** | 28 |
| June 13 | Marcelo & Cristhel | Lambada | Ivete Sangalo – "A Galera" | 6 | 4 | 7 | **6** | 23 |
| June 13 | Belén & Abel | Lambada | Beto Barbosa – "Mar de Emoçoes" | 7 | 4 | 8 | **8** | 27 |
| June 16 | Evangelina & Julián | Lambada | Charles D. Lewis – "Soca Dance" | 9 | 6 | 10 | **9** | 34 |
| June 16 | Carolina & Paulo | Lambada | Beto Barbosa – "Preta" | 9 | 5 | 9 | **9** | 32 |
| June 16 | Tota & Virginia | Lambada | Irmaos Verdade – "És A Minha Doçura" | 8 | 4 | 7 | **7** | 26 |
| June 16 | Fernanda & Adrián | Lambada | Fofão – "Dança das Cores" | 9 | 5 | 9 | **8** | 31 |
| June 16 | Celina & Alejandro | Lambada | Zouk Overy – "Une Femme Amoureuse" | 8 | 5 | 8 | **8** | 29 |
| June 16 | Sabrina & Maximiliano | Lambada | Kaoma – "Espanha" | 10 | 6 | 10 | **10** | 36 |
| June 16 | Serafín & Natalia | Lambada | Beto Barbosa – "Louca Magia" | 8 | 4 | 8 | **8** | 28 |
| June 16 | Verónica & Jorge | Lambada | Quatro – "Passa Sabe" | 7 | 4 | 8 | **8** | 27 |
| June 17 | Jesica & Gabriel | Reggaeton | Alexis & Fido – "El Tiburón" | 8 | 5 | **9** | 9 | 31 |
| June 19 | Mónica & Nicolás | Reggaeton | La Factoría – "Yo Soy Tu Gatita" | 10 | 7 | **10** | 10 | 37 |
| June 19 | Sofía & Lucas | Reggaeton | Wisin & Yandel – "Rakata" | 8 | 4 | **10** | 8 | 30 |
| June 19 | Pampita & Nicolás | Reggaeton | Daddy Yankee – "Dale Caliente" | 6 | 5 | **8** | 9 | 28 |
| June 19 | Pablo & Vanessa | Reggaeton | Pitbull – "Ay Chico (Lengua Afuera)" | 10 | 6 | **10** | 9 | 35 |
| June 19 | Belén & Abel | Reggaeton | | 10 | 7 | **10** | 10 | 37 |
| June 19 | Adabel & Joel | Reggaeton | Daddy Yankee – "El Empuje" | 9 | 5 | **8** | 8 | 30 |
| June 19 | Kenita & Martín | Reggaeton | Daddy Yankee – "Gasolina" | 8 | 4 | **7** | 8 | 27 |
| June 20 | Laura & Miguel | Reggaeton | Ricky Martin – "Que Más Dá" | 10 | 7 | **10** | 10 | 37 |
| June 20 | Valeria & Juan Leandro | Reggaeton | Don Omar – "Entre Tu y Yo" | 10 | 7 | **10** | 10 | 37 |
| June 20 | Sabrina & Maximiliano | Reggaeton | Shakira featuring Wyclef Jean – "Hips Don't Lie" | 7 | 4 | **8** | 8 | 27 |
| June 20 | Jorge & María Lourdes | Reggaeton | Vico C – "La Vecinita" | 8 | 5 | **9** | 8 | 30 |
| June 20 | Karina & Pier | Reggaeton | Don Omar – "Dile" | 9 | 5 | **9** | 8 | 31 |
| June 20 | Marianela & Carlos | Reggaeton | Don Omar – "Suelta Mami" | 8 | 4 | **8** | 7 | 27 |
| June 20 | Eunice & Carlos | Reggaeton | Don Omar – "Provocándome" | 10 | 6 | **9** | 9 | 34 |
| June 20 | María Fernanda & Rodrigo | Reggaeton | Paulina Rubio – "Perros" | 7 | 4 | **8** | 8 | 27 |
| June 23 | Evangelina & Julián | Reggaeton | Ricky Martin featuring Daddy Yankee – "Drop It on Me" | 8 | 4 | **8** | 7 | 27 |
| June 23 | Carolina & Paulo | Reggaeton | Daddy Yankee – "King Daddy" | 7 | 4 | **8** | 7 | 26 |
| June 23 | Tota & Virginia | Reggaeton | Daddy Yankee – "Segurosky" | 10 | 5 | **8** | 8 | 31 |
| June 23 | Fernanda & Adrián | Reggaeton | Héctor & Tito – "Baila Morena" | 10 | 6 | **8** | 9 | 33 |
| June 23 | Celina & Alejandro | Reggaeton | Shakira featuring Alejandro Sanz – "La Tortura" | 10 | 7 | **9** | 10 | 36 |
| June 23 | Serafín & Natalia | Reggaeton | Daddy Yankee – "Lo Que Pasó, Pasó" | 8 | 5 | **7** | 8 | 28 |
| June 23 | Marcelo & Cristhel | Reggaeton | Daddy Yankee – "Rompe" | 6 | 3 | **5** | 10 | 24 |
| June 26 | Pampita & Nicolás | Latin pop | Ricky Martin – "Livin' la Vida Loca" | **8** | 6 | 9 | 10 | 33 |
| June 26 | Pablo & Vanessa | Latin pop | David Bisbal – "Ave María" | **7** | 3 | 7 | 7 | 24 |
| June 26 | Jesica & Gabriel | Latin pop | David Bisbal – "Bulería" | **9** | 5 | 9 | 9 | 32 |
| June 26 | Belén & Abel | Latin pop | Chayanne – "Enamorado" | **9** | 4 | 8 | 8 | 29 |
| June 26 | Sofía & Lucas | Latin pop | Ricky Martin – "Por Arriba, Por Abajo" | **8** | 4 | 7 | 8 | 27 |
| June 26 | Adabel & Joel | Latin pop | Chayanne – "Salomé" | **10** | 7 | 9 | 10 | 36 |
| June 26 | Karina & Pier | Latin pop | Chayanne – "Provócame" | **9** | 6 | 9 | 9 | 33 |
| June 27 | Laura & Miguel | Latin pop | Thalía – "Amar sin ser amada" | **10** | 7 | 9 | 10 | 36 |
| June 27 | Valeria & Juan Leandro | Latin pop | Chayanne – "Boom Boom" | **10** | 6 | 8 | 10 | 34 |
| June 27 | Jorge & María Lourdes | Latin pop | David Bisbal – "Oye El Boom" | **8** | 5 | 8 | 9 | 30 |
| June 27 | Sabrina & Juan Pablo | Latin pop | Ricky Martin – "La Bomba" | **8** | 6 | 8 | 8 | 30 |
| June 27 | Kenita & Martín | Latin pop | Thalía – "¿A quién le importa?" | **8** | 3 | 6 | 7 | 24 |
| June 27 | María Fernanda & Rodrigo | Latin pop | Thalía – "Arrasando" | **9** | 5 | 9 | 9 | 32 |
| June 27 | Eunice & Carlos | Latin pop | Chayanne – "Torero" | **7** | 4 | 7 | 7 | 25 |
| June 27 | Mónica & Nicolás | Latin pop | Chayanne – "Caprichosa" | **7** | 4 | 8 | 8 | 27 |
| June 30 | Evangelina & Julián | Latin pop | Thalía – "Mujer Latina" | **7** | 4 | 7 | 7 | 25 |
| June 30 | Tota & Virginia | Latin pop | Ricky Martin – "María" | **6** | 4 | 8 | 7 | 25 |
| June 30 | Fernanda & Adrián | Latin pop | Chayanne – "Ay Mamá" | **10** | 6 | 9 | 8 | 33 |
| June 30 | Carolina & Paulo | Latin pop | Ricky Martin – "She Bangs" | **7** | 4 | 8 | 6 | 25 |
| June 30 | Celina & Alejandro | Latin pop | David Bisbal – "Lloraré las Penas" | **8** | 5 | 8 | 8 | 29 |
| June 30 | Serafín & Natalia | Latin pop | Ricky Martin – "Dime Que Me Quieres" | **9** | 6 | 9 | 8 | 32 |
| June 30 | Marcelo & Cristhel | Latin pop | Ricky Martin – "Pégate" | **9** | 5 | 9 | 9 | 32 |

=== July ===
Music video, Cuarteto, Pole dance, Beat music and Arabic music
| Date | Couple | Style | Song | Score | | | | Total |
| Date | Couple | Style | Song | Carmen | Jorge | Moria | Gerardo | Total |
|---|---|---|---|---|---|---|---|---|
| July 3 | Jesica & Gabriel | Music video | Madonna – "Sorry" | 8 | 4 | 8 | **8** | 28 |
| July 3 | Pablo & Vanessa | Music video | Michael Jackson – "Beat It" | 6 | 4 | 7 | **7** | 24 |
| July 3 | Pampita & Nicolás | Music video | Britney Spears – "I'm a Slave 4 U" | 10 | 7 | 10 | **9** | 36 |
| July 3 | Sofía & Lucas | Music video | Christina Aguilera – "Ain't No Other Man" | 10 | 7 | 10 | **10** | 37 |
| July 3 | María Fernanda & Rodrigo | Music video | Rihanna featuring Jay-Z – "Umbrella" | 9 | 5 | 8 | **8** | 30 |
| July 3 | Adabel & Joel | Music video | Christina Aguilera – "Ven Conmigo (Solamente Tú)" | 10 | 6 | 8 | **9** | 33 |
| July 3 | Fernanda & Adrián | Music video | Britney Spears – "Toxic" | 8 | 5 | 9 | **8** | 30 |
| July 4 | Valeria & Juan Leandro | Music video | Geri Halliwell – "It's Raining Men" | 8 | 4 | 8 | **9** | 29 |
| July 4 | Sabrina & Juan Pablo | Music video | Madonna – "Vogue" | 10 | 7 | 10 | **10** | 37 |
| July 4 | Jorge & María Lourdes | Music video | Michael Jackson – "Smooth Criminal" | 8 | 5 | 7 | **8** | 28 |
| July 4 | Belén & Abel | Music video | Britney Spears – "(You Drive Me) Crazy" | 10 | 6 | 10 | **10** | 36 |
| July 4 | Mónica & Nicolás | Music video | Beyoncé featuring Jay-Z – "Crazy in Love" | 7 | 4 | 8 | **9** | 28 |
| July 4 | Eunice & Carlos | Music video | Madonna – "Material Girl" | 9 | 5 | 8 | **8** | 30 |
| July 4 | Karina & Pier | Music video | Shakira – "Suerte" | 8 | 6 | 9 | **8** | 31 |
| July 7 | Evangelina & Julián | Music video | Christina Aguilera – "Dirrty" | 10 | 7 | 10 | **10** | 37 |
| July 7 | Carolina & Paulo | Music video | Madonna – "Jump" | 8 | 5 | 8 | **8** | 29 |
| July 7 | Tota & Virginia | Music video | Kiss – "Rock & Roll All Night" | 9 | 6 | 10 | **9** | 34 |
| July 7 | Laura & Miguel | Music video | Madonna – "Fever" | 10 | 8 | 10 | **10** | 38 |
| July 7 | Marcelo & Cristhel | Music video | Will Smith – "Men in Black" | 9 | 5 | 9 | **7** | 30 |
| July 7 | Celina & Alejandro | Music video | Madonna – "Express Yourself" | 9 | 8 | 6 | **10** | 33 |
| July 7 | Serafín & Natalia | Music video | Thalía – "Amor a la Mexicana" | 7 | 4 | 7 | **7** | 25 |
| July 10 | Natalia & Abel | Cuarteto | La Mona Jiménez – "Beso A Beso" | 6 | 3 | **6** | 7 | 22 |
| July 10 | Adabel & Joel | Cuarteto | Jean Carlos – "Entre La Noche y El Día" | 8 | 4 | **8** | 8 | 28 |
| July 10 | Fernanda & Adrián | Cuarteto | Rodrigo – "Amor Clasificado" | 9 | 5 | **9** | 9 | 32 |
| July 10 | Karina & Pier | Cuarteto | Jean Carlos – "Quiéreme" | 9 | 5 | **8** | 8 | 30 |
| July 10 | Eunice & Carlos | Cuarteto | Rodrigo – "Fuego y Pasión" | 10 | 7 | **10** | 10 | 37 |
| July 10 | Mónica & Nicolás | Cuarteto | Jean Carlos – "Pero Me Acuerdo de Ti" | 10 | 6 | **9** | 9 | 34 |
| July 10 | Jesica & Gabriel | Cuarteto | Rodrigo – "Como Le Digo" | 10 | 4 | **8** | 8 | 30 |
| July 11 | Laura & Miguel | Cuarteto | Rodrigo – "Ocho Cuarenta" | 8 | 4 | **8** | 8 | 28 |
| July 11 | Sabrina & Juan Pablo | Cuarteto | Alcides – "Violeta" | 8 | 3 | **9** | 8 | 28 |
| July 11 | Valeria & Juan Leandro | Cuarteto | Rodrigo – "Que Ironía" | 10 | 6 | **10** | 10 | 36 |
| July 11 | María Fernanda & Rodrigo | Cuarteto | Rodrigo – "Como Olvidarla" | 8 | 5 | **8** | 8 | 29 |
| July 11 | Sofía & Lucas | Cuarteto | La Mona Jiménez – "El Agite" | 10 | 6 | **9** | 9 | 34 |
| July 11 | Pablo & Vanessa | Cuarteto | Rodrigo – "Fue lo Mejor del Amor" | 10 | 5 | **9** | 9 | 33 |
| July 14 | Carolina & Paulo | Cuarteto | Rodrigo – "Por lo Que Yo Te Quiero" | 7 | 3 | **5** | 7 | 22 |
| July 14 | Tota & Virginia | Cuarteto | Rodrigo – "Por lo Que Yo Te Quiero" | 9 | 5 | **7** | 7 | 28 |
| July 14 | Pampita & Nicolás | Cuarteto | La Mona Jiménez – "El Bum Bum" | 10 | 7 | **10** | 10 | 37 |
| July 14 | Marcelo & Cristhel | Cuarteto | Ricky Maravilla – "Cuidado Con la Bomba Chita" | 9 | 4 | **8** | 8 | 29 |
| July 14 | Serafín & Natalia | Cuarteto | Ricky Maravilla – "Que Tendrá El Petiso" | 10 | 7 | **10** | 10 | 37 |
| July 14 | Celina & Alejandro | Cuarteto | Walter Olmos – "Por lo Que Yo Te Quiero" | 10 | 6 | **8** | 8 | 32 |
| July 14 | Evangelina & Julián | Cuarteto | Alcalá – "De Reversa Mami" | 10 | 5 | **8** | 8 | 31 |
| July 17 | Sofía & Lucas | Pole dance | Guns N' Roses – "Welcome to the Jungle" | 9 | 6 | 9 | **9** | 33 |
| July 17 | Fernanda & Adrián | Pole dance | Will Smith – "Black Suits Comin' (Nod Ya Head)" | 10 | 6 | 10 | **10** | 36 |
| July 17 | Pampita & Nicolás | Pole dance | Britney Spears – "(I Can't Get No) Satisfaction" | 8 | 4 | 8 | **9** | 29 |
| July 17 | Jesica & Gabriel | Pole dance | Christina Aguilera – "Fighter" | 8 | 5 | 8 | **8** | 29 |
| July 17 | Eunice & Carlos | Pole dance | AC/DC – "Highway to Hell" | 7 | 3 | 7 | **8** | 25 |
| July 17 | Valeria & Juan Leandro | Pole dance | AC/DC – "Back in Black" | 10 | 8 | 10 | **10** | 38 |
| July 18 | Adabel & Joel | Pole dance | Five – "Everybody Get Up" | 10 | 7 | 10 | **10** | 37 |
| July 18 | María Fernanda & Rodrigo | Pole dance | Beyoncé – "Naughty Girl" | 8 | 5 | 8 | **8** | 29 |
| July 18 | Karina & Pier | Pole dance | Madonna – "Frozen" | 10 | 5 | 9 | **10** | 34 |
| July 18 | Natalia & Abel | Pole dance | Aerosmith – "Pink" | 10 | 7 | 10 | **10** | 37 |
| July 18 | Mónica & Nicolás | Pole dance | Lenny Kravitz – "American Woman" | 9 | 4 | 8 | **8** | 29 |
| July 18 | Pablo & Vanessa | Pole dance | Marilyn Manson – "Sweet Dreams (Are Made of This)" | 7 | 4 | 7 | **7** | 25 |
| July 21 | Evangelina & Julián | Pole dance | Madonna – "Like a Virgin" | 8 | 4 | 8 | **9** | 29 |
| July 21 | Celina & Alejandro | Pole dance | Henry Mancini – "The Pink Panther" | 8 | 5 | 8 | **8** | 29 |
| July 21 | Tota & Virginia | Pole dance | Alannah Myles – "Black Velvet" | 10 | 6 | 10 | **9** | 35 |
| July 21 | Marcelo & Cristhel | Pole dance | Madonna – "Don't Tell Me" | 7 | 4 | 9 | **8** | 29 |
| July 21 | Laura & Miguel | Pole dance | Shandi Sinnamon – "He's A Dream" | 9 | 6 | 9 | **9** | 33 |
| July 21 | Serafín & Natalia | Pole dance | Lenny Kravitz – "Always on the Run" | 10 | 7 | 10 | **10** | 37 |
| July 21 | Sabrina & Juan Pablo | Pole dance | Poison – "Unskinny Bop" | 10 | 7 | 10 | **9** | 36 |
| July 24 | Eunice & Carlos | Beat music | Nicky Jones – "Vuelve Primavera" | 7 | 5 | **7** | 9 | 28 |
| July 24 | Natalia & Abel | Beat music | Palito Ortega – "Media Novia" | 9 | 6 | **8** | 9 | 32 |
| July 24 | Sabrina & Juan Pablo | Beat music | Nicky Jones – "Corte y Confección" | 8 | 4 | **8** | 7 | 27 |
| July 24 | Karina & Pier | Beat music | Palito Ortega – "Camelia" | 10 | 7 | **10** | 10 | 37 |
| July 24 | Adabel & Joel | Beat music | Heleno – "La Chica de la Boutique" | 10 | 7 | **10** | 10 | 37 |
| July 24 | María Fernanda & Rodrigo | Beat music | Palito Ortega – "Corazón Contento" | 7 | 4 | **9** | 7 | 27 |
| July 25 | Laura & Miguel | Beat music | Los Naufragos – "Quiero Verte Bailar" | 9 | 6 | **9** | 10 | 34 |
| July 25 | Valeria & Juan Leandro | Beat music | Palito Ortega – "Viva la Vida" | 10 | 5 | **8** | 8 | 31 |
| July 25 | Fernanda & Adrián | Beat music | La Joven Guardia – "La Reina de la Canción" | 8 | 4 | **7** | 8 | 27 |
| July 25 | Jesica & Gabriel | Beat music | Violeta Ribas – "Que Suerte" | 9 | 6 | **10** | 10 | 35 |
| July 25 | Millie & Alejandro | Beat music | Quique Villanueva – "Quiero Gritar Que Te Quiero" | 9 | 6 | **8** | 8 | 31 |
| July 25 | Sofía & Lucas | Beat music | Palito Ortega – "Decí Porque No Querés" | 8 | 4 | **8** | 7 | 27 |
| July 28 | Evangelina & Julián | Beat music | Palito Ortega – "Bienvenido Amor" | 8 | 5 | **8** | 9 | 30 |
| July 28 | Tota & Virginia | Beat music | Los Naufragos – "De Boliche En Boliche" | 8 | 4 | **8** | 7 | 27 |
| July 28 | Pampita & Nicolás | Beat music | Palito Ortega – "Despeinada" | 10 | 7 | **9** | 9 | 35 |
| July 28 | Serafín & Natalia | Beat music | Palito Ortega – "Un Muchacho Como Yo" | 8 | 4 | **7** | 8 | 27 |
| July 28 | Mónica & Nicolás | Beat music | Enrique Guzmán – "Presumida" | 10 | 7 | **10** | 10 | 37 |
| July 28 | Marcelo & Cristhel | Beat music | Palito Ortega – "La Felicidad" | 9 | 5 | **7** | 8 | 30 |
| July 31 | Jesica & Gabriel | Arabic music | Hakim – "Ehdarun" | **10** | 7 | 10 | 10 | 37 |
| July 31 | Sofía & Lucas | Arabic music | Hani Al Omari – "Molfet Lel Nazar" | **9** | 5 | 9 | 9 | 32 |
| July 31 | Pampita & Nicolás | Arabic music | Tarkan – "Simarik" | **10** | 5 | 8 | 8 | 31 |
| July 31 | Karina & Pier | Arabic music | | **8** | 4 | 9 | 9 | 30 |
| July 31 | Adabel & Joel | Arabic music | | **10** | 7 | 10 | 10 | 37 |
| July 31 | Millie & Alejandro | Arabic music | | **9** | 4 | 9 | 9 | 31 |

=== August ===
Arabic music, Latin adagio, Jive and Strip dance
| Date | Couple | Style | Song | Score | | | | Total |
| Date | Couple | Style | Song | Carmen | Jorge | Moria | Gerardo | Total |
|---|---|---|---|---|---|---|---|---|
| August 1 | Laura & Miguel | Arabic music | Amir Sofi – "Isis" | **9** | 7 | 9 | 9 | 34 |
| August 1 | Valeria & Juan Leandro | Arabic music | Mohamed Fouad – "Yalla Hawa" | **10** | 7 | 10 | 10 | 37 |
| August 1 | Fernanda & Adrián | Arabic music | Saber El Robaey – "Sidi Mansour" | **9** | 4 | 8 | 9 | 30 |
| August 1 | Eunice & Carlos | Arabic music | Ehab Tawfik – "Allah Aleik Ya Sidi" | **10** | 7 | 10 | 10 | 37 |
| August 1 | Sabrina & Juan Pablo | Arabic music | Hakim – "Ah Ya Alby" | **8** | 4 | 8 | 8 | 28 |
| August 1 | Natalia & Abel | Arabic music | | **7** | 3 | 6 | 7 | 23 |
| August 4 | Evangelina & Rodrigo | Arabic music | Amr Diab – "Habibi Ya Nour Al Ain" | **8** | 6 | 9 | 9 | 33 |
| August 4 | Marcelo & Cristhel | Arabic music | Tarkan – "Ölürüm Sana" | **8** | 4 | 9 | 9 | 30 |
| August 4 | Tota & Virginia | Arabic music | Hakim – "Wala Wahed" | **9** | 6 | 9 | 9 | 33 |
| August 4 | Serafín & Natalia | Arabic music | Marcus Viana – "Maktub II" | **10** | 7 | 10 | 10 | 37 |
| August 4 | Mónica & Nicolás | Arabic music | Mario Kirlis – "Tamiil" | **10** | 6 | 10 | 10 | 36 |
| August 7 | Sofía & Lucas | Latin adagio | Luis Miguel – "La Incondicional" | 6 | 3 | 7 | **8** | 24 |
| August 7 | Pampita & Nicolás | Latin adagio | Luis Miguel – "Entrégate" | 10 | 6 | 9 | **10** | 35 |
| August 7 | Jesica & Gabriel | Latin adagio | Ricardo Montaner – "Será" | 9 | 6 | 9 | **9** | 33 |
| August 7 | Adabel & Joel | Latin adagio | Ricardo Montaner – "Me Va A Extrañar" | 10 | 7 | 10 | **10** | 37 |
| August 7 | Natalia & Abel | Latin adagio | Enrique Iglesias – "Experiencia Religiosa" | 6 | 3 | 8 | **7** | 24 |
| August 7 | Eunice & Carlos | Latin adagio | Ricky Martin – "Tal Vez" | 8 | 4 | 8 | **8** | 28 |
| August 8 | Laura & Miguel | Latin adagio | Ricardo Montaner – "Déjame Llorar" | 10 | 9 | 10 | **10** | 39 |
| August 8 | Valeria & Juan Leandro | Latin adagio | Ricky Martin – "Fuego de Noche, Nieve de Día" | 10 | 7 | 9 | **10** | 36 |
| August 8 | Karina & Pier | Latin adagio | Ricky Martin – "A Medio Vivir" | — | — | — | — | — |
| August 8 | Fernanda & Adrián | Latin adagio | Cristian Castro – "Nunca Voy A Olvidarte" | 9 | 5 | 8 | **9** | 31 |
| August 8 | Mónica & Nicolás | Latin adagio | Luis Miguel – "Tengo Todo Excepto a Tí" | 10 | 6 | 9 | **9** | 34 |
| August 11 | Evangelina & Julián | Latin adagio | Alejandro Sanz – "Y Si Fuera Ella" | 10 | 6 | 9 | **9** | 34 |
| August 11 | Marcelo & Cristhel | Latin adagio | Ricardo Montaner – "Castillo Azul" | 8 | 4 | 6 | **6** | 24 |
| August 11 | Tota & Virginia | Latin adagio | Ricardo Arjona – "Te Conozco" | 7 | 3 | 6 | **7** | 23 |
| August 11 | Sabrina & Juan Pablo | Latin adagio | Chayanne – "Lo Dejaría Todo" | 10 | 6 | 9 | **8** | 33 |
| August 11 | Karina & Pier | Latin adagio | Ricky Martin – "A Medio Vivir" | 8 | 4 | 7 | **7** | 26 |
| August 11 | Serafín & Natalia | Latin adagio | Ricardo Montaner – "Tan Enamorados" | 7 | 3 | 7 | **7** | 24 |
| August 14 | Pampita & Nicolás | Jive | Christina Aguilera – "Candyman" | **10** | 7 | 10 | 10 | 37 |
| August 14 | Sabrina & Juan Pablo | Jive | Brian Setzer Orchestra – "Jump, Jive & Wail" | **9** | 6 | 9 | 9 | 33 |
| August 14 | Jesica & Gabriel | Jive | Lou Bega – "Mambo No. 5" | **7** | 4 | 7 | 7 | 25 |
| August 14 | Fernanda & Adrián | Jive | Elvis Presley – "All Shook Up" | **7** | 4 | 7 | 7 | 25 |
| August 14 | Adabel & Joel | Jive | | **8** | 5 | 8 | 8 | 29 |
| August 15 | Laura & Miguel | Jive | Madonna – "Hanky Panky" | **9** | 7 | 9 | 9 | 34 |
| August 15 | Valeria & Juan Leandro | Jive | Bette Midler – "Stuff Like That There" | **10** | 8 | 10 | 10 | 38 |
| August 15 | Natalia & Abel | Jive | | **7** | 4 | 7 | 7 | 25 |
| August 15 | Sofía & Lucas | Jive | Carlene Carter – "I Love You 'Cause I Want To" | **8** | 5 | 8 | 8 | 29 |
| August 15 | Mónica & Nicolás | Jive | Ray Charles – "Hit the Road Jack" | **10** | 7 | 9 | 10 | 36 |
| August 18 | Evangelina & Julián | Jive | Wham! – "Wake Me Up Before You Go-Go" | **9** | 6 | 9 | 9 | 33 |
| August 18 | Marcelo & Cristhel | Jive | | **6** | 3 | 6 | 7 | 22 |
| August 18 | Eunice & Carlos | Jive | Little Richard – "Tutti Frutti" | **8** | 5 | 8 | 8 | 29 |
| August 18 | Tota & Virginia | Jive | Shakin' Stevens – "In a Letter to You" | **6** | 3 | 7 | 7 | 23 |
| August 18 | Marixa & Pier | Jive | The Slammers Maximum Band – "Jive Time!" | **10** | 7 | 10 | 10 | 37 |
| August 19 | Sabrina & Juan Pablo | Strip dance | Sinéad O'Connor – "Why Don't You Do Right?" | 9 | 5 | 8 | **9** | 31 |
| August 19 | Mónica & Nicolás | Strip dance | Gary Moore – "Still Got the Blues" | 10 | 6 | 9 | **10** | 35 |
| August 21 | Evangelina & Julián | Strip dance | Aerosmith – "Rag Doll" | 7 | 4 | 8 | **8** | 27 |
| August 21 | Pampita & Nicolás | Strip dance | Joe Cocker – "You Can Leave Your Hat On" | 10 | 7 | 10 | **10** | 37 |
| August 21 | Marcelo & Cristhel | Strip dance | Poison – "Cherry Pie" | 7 | 2 | 5 | **6** | 20 |
| August 21 | Fernanda & Adrián | Strip dance | Alicia Keys – "Fallin'" | 9 | 5 | 8 | **8** | 30 |
| August 21 | Marixa & Pier | Strip dance | Prince – "Cream" | 10 | 6 | 10 | **10** | 36 |
| August 21 | Adabel & Joel | Strip dance | Prince – "Kiss" | 9 | 5 | 8 | **9** | 31 |
| August 22 | Laura & Miguel | Strip dance | Peggy Lee – "I'm a Woman" | — | — | — | — | — |
| August 22 | Valeria & Juan Leandro | Strip dance | Aerosmith – "Cryin'" | 10 | 7 | 9 | **10** | 36 |
| August 22 | Jesica & Gabriel | Strip dance | Aerosmith – "Since I Don't Have You" | 10 | 7 | 10 | **10** | 37 |
| August 22 | Tota & Virginia | Strip dance | AC/DC – "You Shook Me All Night Long" | 9 | 5 | 8 | **9** | 31 |
| August 22 | Eunice & Carlos | Strip dance | Tomoyasu Hotei – "Battle Without Honor or Humanity" | 9 | 5 | 8 | **9** | 31 |
| August 22 | Anabel & Lucas | Strip dance | Aerosmith – "Crazy" | 9 | 6 | 10 | **9** | 34 |

=== September ===
Argentine rock, Aero dance, Merengue and Children's music
| Date | Couple | Style | Song | Score | | | | Total |
| Date | Couple | Style | Song | Carmen | Jorge | Moria | Gerardo | Total |
|---|---|---|---|---|---|---|---|---|
| September 1 | Eunice & Carlos | Argentine rock | Los Ratones Paranoicos – "El Rock del Gato" | 8 | 4 | **8** | 8 | 28 |
| September 1 | Mónica & Nicolás | Argentine rock | Los Redondos – "Mi Perro Dinamita" | 9 | 5 | **9** | 9 | 32 |
| September 1 | Tota & Virginia | Argentine rock | Fabulosos Cadillacs – "El Matador" | 7 | 4 | **9** | 7 | 28 |
| September 1 | Karina & Pier | Argentine rock | Fabiana Cantilo – "Mi Enfermedad" | 8 | 5 | **8** | 9 | 30 |
| September 1 | Adabel & Joel | Argentine rock | Charly García – "Demoliendo Hoteles" | 10 | 6 | **10** | 10 | 36 |
| September 1 | Sofía & Lucas | Argentine rock | Turf – "Loco Un Poco" | 8 | 4 | **9** | 8 | 29 |
| September 2 | Pampita & Nicolás | Argentine rock | Virus – "Wadu Wadu" | 8 | 4 | **9** | 9 | 30 |
| September 2 | Valeria & Juan Leandro | Argentine rock | Sui Generis – "No Llores Por Mi Argentina" | 10 | 7 | **10** | 10 | 37 |
| September 2 | Jesica & Gabriel | Argentine rock | Soda Estereo – "De Música Ligera" | 9 | 6 | **9** | 8 | 32 |
| September 2 | Sabrina & Juan Pablo | Argentine rock | Virus – "Hay Que Salir del Agujero Interior" | 8 | 5 | **8** | 7 | 28 |
| September 2 | Laura & Miguel | Argentine rock | Fito Páez – "Mariposa Technicolor" | 10 | 8 | **10** | 10 | 38 |
| September 2 | Evangelina & Julián | Argentine rock | Los Abuelos de la Nada – "Costumbres Argentinas" | 9 | 5 | **8** | 9 | 31 |
| September 2 | Marcelo & Cristhel | Argentine rock | Charly García – "No Me Dejan Salir" | 8 | 3 | **10** | 7 | 28 |
| September 8 | Evangelina & Julián | Aero dance | Ricky Martin – "María (12" Club Mix)" | **9** | 6 | 9 | 8 | 32 |
| September 8 | Jesica & Gabriel | Aero dance | Chayanne – "Torero" | **8** | 5 | 8 | 9 | 30 |
| September 8 | Karina & Pier | Aero dance | Christina Aguilera – "Pero Me Acuerdo de Ti (Fransesc Pellicer Dance Club Remix)" | **7** | 4 | 7 | 7 | 25 |
| September 8 | Adabel & Joel | Aero dance | Thalía – "Amor a la Mexicana (Fiesta Latina Club Mix)" | **9** | 5 | 8 | 9 | 31 |
| September 8 | Mónica & Nicolás | Aero dance | Thalía – "¿A quién le importa? (HQ2 Radio Edit)" | **10** | 7 | 10 | 10 | 37 |
| September 9 | Laura & Miguel | Aero dance | Christina Aguilera – "Falsas Esperanzas (Dance Radio Mix)" | **8** | 5 | 9 | 8 | 30 |
| September 9 | Valeria & Juan Leandro | Aero dance | Ricky Martin – "Pégate (Ralphi Rosario Club Radio Edit)" | **10** | 7 | 10 | 10 | 37 |
| September 9 | Tota & Virginia | Aero dance | Chayanne – "Provócame (Remix)" | **6** | 4 | 9 | 8 | 27 |
| September 9 | Pampita & Nicolás | Aero dance | Thalía – "Arrasando" | **10** | 6 | 9 | 9 | 34 |
| September 9 | Sofía & Lucas | Aero dance | Luis Miguel – "Cuando Calienta El Sol (Remix)" | — | — | — | — | — |
| September 9 | Sabrina & Juan Pablo | Aero dance | Thalía – "No Me Enseñaste (Estefano Remix)" | **7** | 4 | 7 | 7 | 25 |
| September 9 | Eunice & Carlos | Aero dance | Luis Miguel – "Ahora Te Puedes Marchar (Remix)" | **9** | 7 | 9 | 9 | 34 |
| September 15 | Evangelina & Julián | Merengue | Cristian Castro – "Azul" | 8 | 4 | 8 | **8** | 28 |
| September 15 | Mónica & Nicolás | Merengue | Los Hermanos Rosario – "El Fin de Semana" | 10 | 7 | 10 | **10** | 37 |
| September 15 | Adabel & Joel | Merengue | Wilfrido Vargas – "El Baile del Perrito" | 8 | 5 | 8 | **8** | 29 |
| September 16 | Laura & Miguel | Merengue | Manny Manuel – "Corazón Partio" | 9 | 7 | 9 | **9** | 34 |
| September 16 | Valeria & Juan Leandro | Merengue | Olga Tañón – "Es Mentiroso" | 10 | 6 | 9 | **9** | 34 |
| September 16 | Jesica & Gabriel | Merengue | Carlos Manuel – "Esa Chica Tiene Swing" | 10 | 7 | 10 | **10** | 37 |
| September 16 | Pampita & Nicolás | Merengue | Juan Luis Guerra 440 – "A Pedir Su Mano" | 10 | 7 | 10 | **9** | 36 |
| September 16 | Eunice & Carlos | Merengue | Grupo Heavy – "Sube la Faldita" | 10 | 6 | 10 | **10** | 36 |
| September 16 | Sofía & Lucas | Merengue | Elvis Crespo – "Suavemente" | 9 | 6 | 9 | **10** | 34 |
| September 16 | Tota & Virginia | Merengue | Juan Luis Guerra 440 – "La Bilirrubina" | 9 | 6 | 8 | **8** | 31 |
| September 16 | Marixa & Pier | Merengue | Elvis Crespo – "Tu Sonrisa" | 10 | 7 | 10 | **10** | 37 |
| September 22 | Jesica & Gabriel | Children's music | Xuxa – "Ilarié" | 8 | 4 | **7** | 8 | 27 |
| September 22 | Karina & Pier | Children's music | Xuxa – "Crocki, Crocki" | 7 | 4 | **7** | 8 | 26 |
| September 22 | Eunice & Carlos | Children's music | Patito Feo – "Amigos del Corazón" | 10 | 6 | **8** | 9 | 33 |
| September 23 | Mónica & Nicolás | Children's music | Patito Feo – "Las Divinas" | 10 | 5 | **9** | 10 | 34 |
| September 23 | Laura & Miguel | Children's music | Patito Feo – "A Volar" | 10 | 7 | **9** | 10 | 36 |
| September 23 | Valeria & Juan Leandro | Children's music | Chiquititas – "Chufa Chufa Cha" | 10 | 6 | **10** | 10 | 36 |
| September 23 | Pampita & Nicolás | Children's music | Xuxa – "Chindolelé" | 8 | 5 | **8** | 8 | 29 |
| September 23 | Tota & Virginia | Children's music | Pipo Pescador – "El Auto de Papá" | 7 | 4 | **7** | 7 | 25 |
| September 23 | Evangelina & Julián | Children's music | Flavia Palmiero – "La Ola Esta de Fiesta" | 8 | 4 | **7** | 8 | 27 |
| September 23 | Sofía & Lucas | Children's music | Patito Feo – "Fiesta" | 10 | 5 | **10** | 10 | 35 |

==== Re-entry ====
Re-entry
| Date | Couple | Style | Song |
|---|---|---|---|
| September 29 | Adriana & Martín | Cuarteto | Rodrigo – "Como Le Digo" |
| September 29 | Pablo & Vanessa | Cuarteto | Walter Olmos – "Por lo Que Yo Te Quiero" |
| September 29 | Matías & Gisela | Cuarteto | La Mona Jiménez – "El Bum Bum" |
| September 29 | Fernanda & Adrián | Cuarteto | Jean Carlos – "Quiéreme" |
| September 29 | Jorge & María Lourdes | Cuarteto | Rodrigo – "Soy Cordobés" |
| September 29 | Gladys & Ariel | Cuarteto | La Mona Jiménez – "Beso A Beso" |
| September 29 | Sabrina S. & Jorge | Cuarteto | Banda XXI – "Pero Me Acuerdo de Ti" |
| September 29 | Belén T. & Diego | Cuarteto | Rodrigo – "Que Ironía" |
| September 29 | Adabel & Joel | Cuarteto | La Mona Jiménez – "El Agite" |
| September 29 | Serafín & Natalia | Cuarteto | Ricky Maravilla – "Que Tendrá El Petizo" |
| September 30 | María Fernanda & Rodrigo | Argentine cumbia | Gilda – "Fuiste" |
| September 30 | Marianela & Carlos | Argentine cumbia | Volcán – "Esa Malvada" |
| September 30 | Victoria & Eliseo | Argentine cumbia | Amar Azul – "Yo Me Enamoré" |
| September 30 | Mariana & Jorge | Argentine cumbia | Ráfaga – "Una Ráfaga de Amor" |
| September 30 | Natacha & Cristian | Argentine cumbia | Ráfaga – "Ritmo Caliente" |
| September 30 | Karina & Pier | Argentine cumbia | Gilda – "No Me Arrepiento de Este Amor" |
| September 30 | Marcelo & Cristhel | Argentine cumbia | Antonio Ríos – "Nunca Me Faltes" |
| September 30 | Cicciolina & Alejandro | Argentine cumbia | Lía Crucet – "Cumbia Apretadita" |
| September 30 | Kenita & Martín | Argentine cumbia | Damas Gratis – "Se Te Ve la Tanga" |
| September 30 | Marixa & Juan Pablo | Argentine cumbia | Los Palmeras – "Bombón Asesino" |
| September 30 | Natalia & Abel | Argentine cumbia | Ráfaga – "Mentirosa" |

=== October ===
Jazz, Country music, Divas and Adagio from telenovelas
| Date | Couple | Style | Song | Score | | | | Total |
| Date | Couple | Style | Song | Carmen | Jorge | Moria | Gerardo | Total |
|---|---|---|---|---|---|---|---|---|
| October 6 | Evangelina & Julián | Jazz | Robbie Williams – "Beyond the Sea" | **7** | 4 | 9 | 8 | 28 |
| October 6 | Pablo & Vanessa | Jazz | Robbie Williams – "Have You Met Miss Jones?" | **6** | 3 | 8 | 7 | 19–1=18 |
| October 6 | Adabel & Joel | Jazz | Frank Sinatra – "I Get a Kick out of You" | **7** | 4 | 8 | 8 | 27–1=26 |
| October 6 | Mariana & Jorge | Jazz | Frank Sinatra – "I Believe" | **6** | 3 | 6 | 6 | 21–1=20 |
| October 6 | Pampita & Nicolás | Jazz | George Michael – "Secret Love" | **9** | 6 | 9 | 9 | 33 |
| October 6 | Jesica & Gabriel | Jazz | Frank Sinatra – "Somewhere My Love" | **10** | 7 | 10 | 10 | 37 |
| October 6 | Marixa & Juan Pablo | Jazz | Frank Sinatra – "Strangers in the Night" | **8** | 5 | 8 | 8 | 29–1=28 |
| October 6 | Mónica & Nicolás | Jazz | Robbie Williams – "Mack the Knife" | **9** | 6 | 9 | 9 | 33 |
| October 7 | Valeria & Juan Leandro | Jazz | Frank Sinatra – "Cheek to Cheek" | **8** | 6 | 8 | 9 | 31 |
| October 7 | Laura & Miguel | Jazz | Michael Bublé – "Come Fly with Me" | **10** | 6 | 8 | 8 | 32 |
| October 7 | Tota & Virginia | Jazz | Bono and Frank Sinatra – "I Got You Under My Skin" | **6** | 3 | 7 | 6 | 22 |
| October 7 | María Fernanda & Rodrigo | Jazz | Frank Sinatra – "What Now My Love?" | **7** | 4 | 7 | 7 | 25–1=24 |
| October 7 | Matías & Gisela | Jazz | Frank Sinatra – "Fly Me to the Moon" | **8** | 4 | 7 | 7 | 26–1=25 |
| October 7 | Eunice & Carlos | Jazz | Frank Sinatra – "Mrs. Robinson" | **10** | 7 | 9 | 9 | 35 |
| October 7 | Sofía & Lucas | Jazz | Frank Sinatra and Dean Martin – "Ain't that a Kick in the Head" | **7** | 4 | 7 | 7 | 18 |
| October 7 | Natalia & Abel | Jazz | Frank Sinatra – "You Make Me Feel So Young" | **7** | 4 | 8 | 7 | 26–1=25 |
| October 13 | Mónica & Nicolás | Country music | Creedence Clearwater Revival – "My Baby Left Me" | 8 | 5 | 8 | **9** | 30 |
| October 13 | Pampita & Nicolás | Country music | John Fogerty – "Jambalaya (On The Bayou)" | 9 | 6 | 9 | **9** | 33 |
| October 13 | Jesica & Gabriel | Country music | Kenny Rogers – "The Gambler" | 10 | 7 | 10 | **10** | 37 |
| October 13 | Adabel & Martín | Country music | John Fogerty – "Hot Rod Heart" | 10 | 7 | 10 | **10** | 37–1=36 |
| October 13 | Eliana & Julián | Country music | Creedence Clearwater Revival – "Bad Moon Rising" | 8 | 4 | 7 | **8** | 26 |
| October 13 | Natalia & Abel | Country music | Alabama – "If You're Gonna Play in Texas (You Gotta Have a Fiddle in the Band)" | 8 | 4 | 7 | **8** | 27–1=26 |
| October 14 | Laura & Miguel | Country music | Gretchen Wilson – "Redneck Woman" | 9 | 6 | 9 | **9** | 33 |
| October 14 | Valeria & Juan Leandro | Country music | Dire Straits – "Walk of Life" | 10 | 7 | 10 | **10** | 37 |
| October 14 | Marixa & Juan Pablo | Country music | Creedence Clearwater Revival – "Commotion" | 9 | 6 | 8 | **8** | 31–1=30 |
| October 14 | Matías & Gisela | Country music | Creedence Clearwater Revival – "Hello Mary Lou" | 9 | 6 | 8 | **8** | 31–1=30 |
| October 14 | Eunice & Carlos | Country music | Creedence Clearwater Revival – "Lookin' out My Back Door" | 10 | 7 | 9 | **9** | 35 |
| October 14 | Sofía & Lucas | Country music | Sonny & Cher – "All I Ever Need Is You" | 9 | 5 | 8 | **8** | 30 |
| October 14 | María Fernanda & Rodrigo | Country music | Creedence Clearwater Revival – "Down on the Corner" | 10 | 4 | 8 | **7** | 29–1= 28 |
| October 14 | Tota & Virginia | Country music | Billy Ray Cyrus – "Achy Breaky Heart" | 8 | 4 | 6 | **7** | 25 |
| October 14 | Mariana & Jorge | Country music | Creedence Clearwater Revival – "Proud Mary" | 6 | 4 | 6 | **9** | 25–1= 24 |
| October 20 | Mónica & Nicolás | Divas | Madonna – "Sorry" | 10 | 6 | **10** | 9 | 35 |
| October 20 | Jesica & Rodrigo | Divas | Jennifer Lopez – "Let's Get Loud" | 9 | 5 | **8** | 9 | 31 |
| October 20 | Pampita & Nicolás | Divas | Kylie Minogue – "Can't Get You Out of My Head" | 10 | 7 | **10** | 10 | 37 |
| October 20 | Adabel & Martín | Divas | Madonna – "Jump" | 8 | 5 | **9** | 8 | 30–1=29 |
| October 21 | Laura & Miguel | Divas | Cher – "Strong Enough" | 10 | 7 | **10** | 10 | 37 |
| October 21 | Valeria & Juan Leandro | Divas | Donna Summer – "On the Radio" | 10 | 6 | **9** | 10 | 35 |
| October 21 | Matías & Gisela | Divas | Madonna – "Hung Up" | 8 | 5 | **8** | 8 | 29 |
| October 21 | Eunice & Carlos | Divas | Britney Spears – "(You Drive Me) Crazy" | 9 | 6 | **10** | 9 | 34 |
| October 21 | Marixa & Juan Pablo | Divas | Rihanna – "Don't Stop the Music" | 8 | 5 | **9** | 9 | 31 |
| October 21 | Mariana & Jorge | Divas | Donna Summer – "Hot Stuff" | 7 | 5 | **5** | 8 | 26 |
| October 21 | Claudia & Julián | Divas | Beyoncé featuring Jay-Z – "Crazy in Love" | 7 | 4 | **8** | 8 | 27 |
| October 21 | Sofía & Lucas | Divas | Britney Spears – "...Baby One More Time" | 8 | 5 | **8** | 8 | 29 |
| October 21 | Tota & Virginia | Divas | The Bangles – "Walk Like an Egyptian" | 8 | 5 | **10** | 9 | 32 |
| October 21 | María Fernanda & Rodrigo | Divas | Cher – "Believe" | — | — | — | — | — |
| October 27 | Mónica & Nicolás | Adagio from telenovelas | Paz Martínez – "Amor Pirata" (from Bellas y Audaces) | 9 | 5 | 9 | **10** | 33 |
| October 27 | Eunice & Carlos | Adagio from telenovelas | Ricardo Montaner – "Tan Enamorados" (from Niña Bonita) | 9 | 6 | 9 | **9** | 33 |
| October 27 | Pampita & Nicolás | Adagio from telenovelas | Paz Martinez – "Y Qué?" (from Padre Coraje) | 10 | 7 | 10 | **10** | 37 |
| October 27 | Jesica & Gabriel | Adagio from telenovelas | Valeria Lynch – "Amamé En Cámara Lenta" (from Ese Hombre Prohibido) | 10 | 6 | 10 | **10** | 36 |
| October 27 | Tota & Virginia | Adagio from telenovelas | José Luis Rodríguez – "De Punta A Punta" (from Volver a Empezar) | 8 | 4 | 7 | **7** | 26 |
| October 28 | Laura & Miguel | Adagio from telenovelas | Valeria Lynch – "Extraña Dama" (from La Extraña Dama) | 9 | 6 | 10 | **9** | 34 |
| October 28 | Valeria & Juan Leandro | Adagio from telenovelas | Carica – "Abrázame" (from Nano) | 10 | 7 | 10 | **10** | 37 |
| October 28 | Marixa & Juan Pablo | Adagio from telenovelas | Valeria Lynch – "Me Das Cada Día Mas" (from Plumas y Lentejuelas) | 10 | 5 | 9 | **9** | 33 |
| October 28 | Sofía & Lucas | Adagio from telenovelas | Ricardo Montaner – "Bésame la Boca" (from Al diablo con los guapos) | 10 | 6 | 10 | **10** | 36 |
| October 28 | Adabel & Martín | Adagio from telenovelas | Valeria Lynch – "Mentira" (from Dos Para Una Mentira) | 9 | 6 | 10 | **9** | 34 |
| October 28 | María Fernanda & Rodrigo | Adagio from telenovelas | Paz Martínez – "Una Lagrima Sobre El Teléfono" (from Una Voz en el Teléfono) | 9 | 5 | 10 | **9** | 33 |
| October 28 | Mariana & Jorge | Adagio from telenovelas | Natalia Oreiro – "Me Muero de Amor" (from Muñeca Brava) | 9 | 6 | 9 | **9** | 33 |
| October 28 | Matías & Gisela | Adagio from telenovelas | Alejandro Lerner – "Campeones de la Vida" (from Campeones de la Vida) | 10 | 5 | 9 | **8** | 32 |

=== November ===
Aquadance, Dancing in the rain, Samba, Dancing in the snow, Pole dance and Latin pop
| Date | Couple | Style | Song | Score | | | | Total |
| Date | Couple | Style | Song | Carmen | Jorge | Moria | Gerardo | Total |
|---|---|---|---|---|---|---|---|---|
| November 3 | Pampita & Nicolás | Aquadance | Rolling Stones – "Angie" | 9 | 6 | **9** | 9 | 33 |
| November 3 | Mónica & Nicolás | Aquadance | Tina Turner – "We Don't Need Another Hero" | 9 | 5 | **10** | 9 | 33 |
| November 3 | Marixa & Juan Pablo | Aquadance | Queen – "Bohemian rapsody" | 8 | 4 | **9** | 9 | 30 |
| November 3 | Sofía & Lucas | Aquadance | U2 – "With or Without You" | 9 | 4 | **8** | 9 | 30 |
| November 3 | Jesica & Gabriel | Aquadance | Foreigner – "I Want to Know What Love Is" | 8 | 5 | **9** | 8 | 30 |
| November 3 | Eunice & Carlos | Aquadance | Guns N' Roses – "November Rain" | 9 | 5 | **9** | 9 | 32 |
| November 4 | Valeria & Juan Leandro | Aquadance | Queen – "The Show Must Go On" | 10 | 7 | **9** | 10 | 36 |
| November 4 | Laura & Miguel | Aquadance | Robbie Williams – "Angels" | 10 | 8 | **10** | 9 | 37 |
| November 4 | Adabel & Martín | Aquadance | Duran Duran – "Ordinary World" | 10 | 6 | **10** | 10 | 36 |
| November 4 | Matías & Gisela | Aquadance | Oasis – "Don't Look Back in Anger" | 8 | 4 | **8** | 8 | 28 |
| November 4 | Tota & Virginia | Aquadance | Aerosmith – "Amazing" | 10 | 6 | **10** | 9 | 35 |
| November 4 | María Fernanda & Rodrigo | Aquadance | Sting – "Desert Rose" | 9 | 5 | **9** | 9 | 32 |
| November 10 | Pampita & Nicolás | Dancing in the rain | Depeche Mode – "Enjoy the Silence" | 10 | 8 | 10 | **10** | 38 |
| November 10 | Mónica & Nicolás | Dancing in the rain | Michael Bolton – "When a Man Loves a Woman" | 8 | 5 | 8 | **9** | 30 |
| November 10 | Adabel & Martín | Dancing in the rain | John Paul Young – "Love Is in the Air" | 9 | 5 | 8 | **9** | 32 |
| November 10 | Jesica & Gabriel | Dancing in the rain | Patito Feo – "Amigos del Corazon" | 8 | 4 | 8 | **8** | 28 |
| November 10 | Sofía & Lucas | Dancing in the rain | Jerry Lee Lewis – "Great Balls of Fire" | 8 | 4 | 8 | **8** | 28 |
| November 10 | Tota & Virginia | Dancing in the rain | Little Richard – "Tutti Frutti" | 8 | 4 | 8 | **8** | 28 |
| November 11 | Laura & Miguel | Dancing in the rain | Aerosmith – "Rag Doll" | 9 | 6 | 9 | **9** | 33 |
| November 11 | Valeria & Juan Leandro | Dancing in the rain | Alicia Keys – "Fallin'" | 10 | 7 | 10 | **10** | 37 |
| November 11 | María Fernanda & Rodrigo | Dancing in the rain | The Jackson Five – "Blame It on the Boogie" | 8 | 4 | 8 | **8** | 28 |
| November 11 | Marixa & Juan Pablo | Dancing in the rain | Madonna – "Material Girl" | 8 | 5 | 8 | **9** | 30 |
| November 11 | Ximena & Carlos | Dancing in the rain | Donna Summer – "Last Dance" | 8 | 4 | 9 | **8** | 29 |
| November 17 | Mónica & Nicolás | Samba | Gloria Estefan and Só Pra Contrariar – "Santo Santo" | **8** | 5 | 8 | 9 | 30 |
| November 17 | Valeria & Juan Leandro | Samba | David Bisbal – "Lloraré las Penas" | **10** | 7 | 10 | 10 | 37 |
| November 17 | Eunice & Carlos | Samba | Juanes – "A Dios le Pido" | **9** | 5 | 8 | 9 | 31 |
| November 17 | Pampita & Nicolás | Samba | Sérgio Mendes – "Magalenha" | **8** | 5 | 9 | 9 | 31 |
| November 17 | Laura & Miguel | Samba | Ricky Martin – "La Bomba" | **8** | 6 | 8 | 9 | 31 |
| November 17 | Marixa & Juan Pablo | Samba | Shakira featuring Wyclef Jean – "Hips Don't Lie" | **8** | 6 | 10 | 10 | 34 |
| November 17 | Adabel & Joel | Samba | Shakira featuring Alejandro Sanz – "La Tortura" | **9** | 5 | 9 | 8 | 31 |
| November 17 | María Fernanda & Rodrigo | Samba | Thalía – "Rosalinda" | **9** | 7 | 10 | 9 | 35 |
| November 17 | Tota & Virginia | Samba | La Mosca – "Yo te Quiero Dar" | **8** | 4 | 5 | 6 | 23 |
| November 20 | Pampita & Nicolás | Dancing in the snow | INXS vs Kash – "Dream on Black Girl (Original Sin) (Roman Vincent'o Remix Edit)" | **8** | 5 | 8 | 8 | 29 |
| November 20 | Mónica & Nicolás | Dancing in the snow | Boogie Pimps – "Somebody to Love" | **8** | 5 | 8 | 9 | 30 |
| November 20 | Marixa & Juan Pablo | Dancing in the snow | Mika – "Relax, Take It Easy" | **7** | 4 | 7 | 8 | 26 |
| November 20 | Valeria & Juan Leandro | Dancing in the snow | Bon Jovi – "It's My Life" | **9** | 6 | 9 | 10 | 34 |
| November 20 | Adabel & Joel | Dancing in the snow | N-Trance – "Da Ya Think I'm Sexy?" | **9** | 6 | 9 | 9 | 33 |
| November 20 | Eunice & Carlos | Dancing in the snow | Planet Funk – "Chase the Sun" | **10** | 7 | 9 | 9 | 35 |
| November 20 | Laura & Miguel | Dancing in the snow | Madonna – "Give It to Me (Paul Oakenfold Remix)" | **9** | 6 | 9 | 9 | 33 |
| November 20 | Tota & Virginia | Dancing in the snow | Spice Girls – "Wannabe (Ultimix Remix)" | **8** | 5 | 8 | 7 | 28 |
| November 20 | María Fernanda & Rodrigo | Dancing in the snow | Scissors Sisters – "Comfortably Numb" | **8** | 5 | 8 | 8 | 29 |
| November 25 | Pampita & Nicolás | Pole dance | Bon Jovi – "You Give Love a Bad Name" | 8 | 5 | 8 | **8** | 29 |
| November 25 | Adabel & Joel | Pole dance | INXS – "New Sensation" | 9 | 6 | 10 | **8** | 33 |
| November 25 | Anabel & Lucas | Pole dance | Billy Idol – "Mony Mony" | 8 | 5 | 8 | **8** | 29 |
| November 25 | Mónica & Nicolás | Pole dance | INXS – "Suicide Blonde" | 10 | 6 | 9 | **9** | 34 |
| November 25 | Valeria & Juan Leandro | Pole dance | Poison – "Unskinny Bop" | 9 | 6 | 9 | **9** | 33 |
| November 25 | Marixa & Juan Pablo | Pole dance | Lenny Kravitz – "Always on the Run" | 7 | 5 | 8 | **8** | 28 |
| November 25 | Eunice & Carlos | Pole dance | Will Smith – "Black Suits Comin' (Nod Ya Head)" | 9 | 5 | 9 | **9** | 32 |
| November 25 | María Fernanda & Rodrigo | Pole dance | INXS – "Mystify" | 8 | 5 | 8 | **8** | 29 |
| November 27 | Valeria & Juan Leandro | Latin pop | David Bisbal – "Ave María" | 9 | 5 | 8 | **9** | 31 |
| November 27 | Adabel & Joel | Latin pop | Chayanne – "Baila Baila" | 7 | 4 | 7 | **9** | 27 |
| November 27 | Pampita & Nicolás | Latin pop | Ricky Martin – "She Bangs" | 9 | 6 | 10 | **10** | 35 |
| November 27 | Mónica & Nicolás | Latin pop | David Bisbal – "Bulería" | 7 | 4 | 8 | **7** | 26 |
| November 27 | María Fernanda & Rodrigo | Latin pop | Ricky Martin – "Pégate" | 8 | 5 | 8 | **8** | 29 |
| November 27 | Eunice & Carlos | Latin pop | Ricky Martin – "Livin' la Vida Loca" | 9 | 5 | 9 | **9** | 32 |
| November 27 | Anabel & Lucas | Latin pop | Thalía – "Mujer Latina" | 8 | 5 | 8 | **8** | 29 |
| November 27 | Marixa & Juan Pablo | Latin pop | Thalía – "Arrasando" | 10 | 6 | 10 | **10** | 36 |

=== December ===
==== Duel ====
Duel
| Date | Couple | Style | Song |
|---|---|---|---|
| December 2 | Pampita & Nicolás | Cha-cha-cha | Christina Aguilera – "Falsas Esperanzas" |
| December 2 | Valeria & Juan Leandro | Cha-cha-cha | Thalía – "Echa Pa' Lante" |
| December 2 | Marixa & Juan Pablo | Cha-cha-cha | Santana featuring Maná – "Corazón Espinado" |
| December 2 | María Fernanda & Rodrigo | Cha-cha-cha | La Mosca – "Cha Cha Cha" |
| December 2 | Laura & Lucas | Cha-cha-cha | Pussycat Dolls – "Sway" |
| December 2 | Adabel & Joel | Cha-cha-cha | Celia Cruz – "Ríe y Llora" |

==== Semi-final and Final ====
Semi-final and Final
| Date | Couple | Style | Song | Points | | | | Result |
| Date | Couple | Style | Song | Carmen | Jorge | Moria | Gerardo | Result |
|---|---|---|---|---|---|---|---|---|
| 1st Semi-final (December 8) | Pampita & Nicolás | Argentine cumbia | Ráfaga – "Ráfaga de Amor" | — | — | 1 | 1 | **1** |
| 1st Semi-final (December 8) | María Fernanda & Rodrigo | Argentine cumbia | Gilda – "Fuiste" | 1 | 1 | — | — | **1** |
| 1st Semi-final (December 8) | Pampita & Nicolás | Arabic music | Tarkan – "Simarik" | 1 | 1 | 1 | 1 | **1** |
| 1st Semi-final (December 8) | María Fernanda & Rodrigo | Arabic music | Tarkan – "Şıkıdım" | — | — | — | — | — |
| 1st Semi-final (December 8) | Pampita & Nicolás | Music video | Britney Spears – "I'm a Slave 4 U" | 1 | 1 | — | — | **1** |
| 1st Semi-final (December 8) | María Fernanda & Rodrigo | Music video | Madonna – "Express Yourself" | — | — | 1 | 1 | **1** |
| 1st Semi-final (December 8) | Pampita & Nicolás | Rock and roll | Elvis Presley – "Jailhouse Rock" | — | — | — | 1 | — |
| 1st Semi-final (December 8) | María Fernanda & Rodrigo | Rock and roll | Elvis Presley – "Blue Suede Shoes" | 1 | 1 | 1 | — | **1** |
| 2nd Semi-final (December 9) | Laura & Lucas | Cuarteto | Rodrigo – "Ocho Cuarenta" | — | — | 1 | 1 | **1** |
| 2nd Semi-final (December 9) | Valeria & Juan Leandro | Cuarteto | Rodrigo – "Que Ironía" | 1 | 1 | — | — | **1** |
| 2nd Semi-final (December 9) | Laura & Lucas | Divas | Madonna – "Fever" | 1 | 1 | 1 | — | **1** |
| 2nd Semi-final (December 9) | Valeria & Juan Leandro | Divas | Donna Summer – "On the Radio" | — | — | — | 1 | — |
| 2nd Semi-final (December 9) | Laura & Lucas | Lambada | Kaoma – "Mélodie d'Amour" | 1 | — | — | — | — |
| 2nd Semi-final (December 9) | Valeria & Juan Leandro | Lambada | Arrow – "Groove Master" | — | 1 | 1 | 1 | **1** |
| 2nd Semi-final (December 9) | Laura & Lucas | Jive | Madonna – "Hanky Panky" | — | — | 1 | 1 | **1** |
| 2nd Semi-final (December 9) | Valeria & Juan Leandro | Jive | Bette Midler – "Stuff Like That There" | 1 | 1 | — | — | **1** |
| Final (December 11) | Laura & Lucas | Disco | Beyoncé – "One Night Only" | — | 1 | 1 | 1 | **1** |
| Final (December 11) | Pampita & Nicolás | Disco | Donna Summer – "Last Dance" | 1 | — | — | — | — |
| Final (December 11) | Laura & Lucas | Axé music | Margareth Menezes – "Dandalunda" | 1 | 1 | 1 | — | **1** |
| Final (December 11) | Pampita & Nicolás | Axé music | Tchakabum – "Dança da Maoçinha" | — | — | — | 1 | — |
| Final (December 11) | Laura & Lucas | Reggaeton | Ricky Martin – "Que Más Dá" | 1 | 1 | — | 1 | **1** |
| Final (December 11) | Pampita & Nicolás | Reggaeton | Daddy Yankee – "Dale Caliente" | — | — | 1 | — | — |
| Final (December 11) | Laura & Lucas | Samba | Ricky Martin – "La Bomba" | — | 1 | 1 | 1 | **1** |
| Final (December 11) | Pampita & Nicolás | Samba | Sérgio Mendes – "Magalenha" | 1 | — | — | — | — |
