= Sofía Zámolo =

Argentine actress

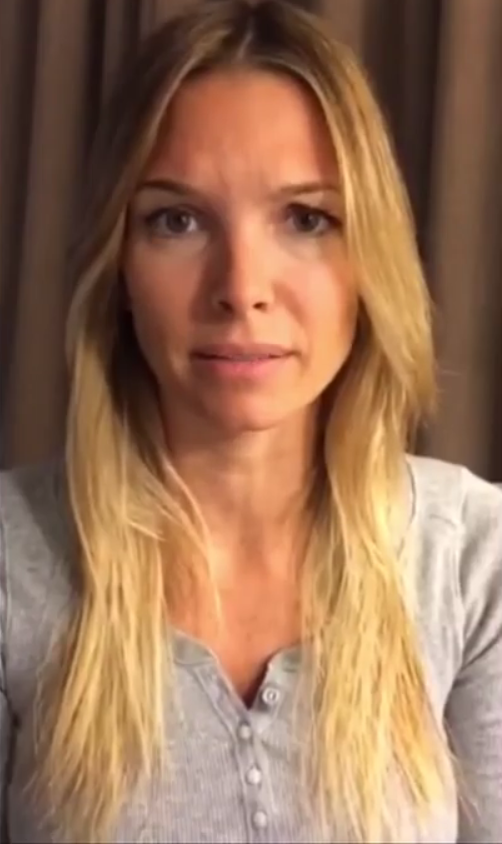
- Zamolo in 2014
- Occupations: Model; actress; television presenter

Sofía Zámolo is an Argentine model, actress and television presenter.

== Career ==
In 2008 she participated in the Bailando por un Sueño 2008.

In 2009, she made a small participation in the youth television series Niní.

== Filmography ==
=== Television ===
Year	Title	Character	Channel
2009	Niní	Tamara	Telefe

=== Television Programs ===
Year	Program	Channel	Notes
2008	Bailando por un Sueño 2008	Canal 13	Participant
