= Rodrigo (musician) =

Argentine singer (1973–2000)

- Also known as: El Potro ("The Colt")
- Born: Rodrigo Alejandro Bueno; 24 May 1973; Córdoba, Argentina
- Died: 24 June 2000 (aged 27) Berazategui, Argentina
- Genres: Cuarteto, salsa, merengue
- Occupation: Singer-songwriter
- Instrument: Vocals
- Years active: 1988–2000
- Labels: Polygram Records, Sony Music, Magenta Records
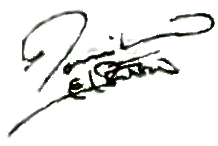
- Website: Elpotrorodrigo.com (defunct) Signature of Rodrigo

Rodrigo Alejandro Bueno (Spanish: [roˈðɾiɣo aleˈxandɾo ˈβweno]; 24 May 1973 – 24 June 2000), also known by his stage name Rodrigo or his nickname "El Potro" ("the Colt"), was an Argentine singer of cuarteto music. He is widely regarded as the best, most famous and most influential singer in the history of this genre. Bueno's style was marked by his on-stage energy and charisma. His short, dyed hair and casual clothes differed from typical cuarteto singers with strident colors and long curly hair. During his career, Bueno expanded cuarteto music to the Argentine national scene, remaining one of the main figures of the genre. The son of Eduardo Alberto Bueno, a record shop owner and music producer, and Beatriz Olave, a songwriter and newsstand owner, Rodrigo Bueno was born into the cuarteto musical scene in Córdoba, Argentina. He first appeared on television at the age of two, on the show Fiesta de Cuarteto, along with family friend Juan Carlos "La Mona" Jiménez. With the help of his father, he recorded an album of children's songs, Disco Baby, at the age of five. During his preteen years he informally joined the local band Chébere during live performances. He dropped out of school at the age of twelve and successfully auditioned for the band Manto Negro. After five years without success in Córdoba, Bueno's father decided to try to launch his son's career as a soloist in Buenos Aires, Argentina. In 1990, Bueno released his first record, La Foto de tu Cuerpo, on Polygram Records. Bueno introduced his next album, Aprendiendo a Vivir, with a live performance at the nightclub Fantástico Bailable. The performance brought him his first recognition in the tropical music scene.

In 1995, Bueno signed a contract with Sony Music that lasted only for the release of the album Sabroso; the next year, he moved to Magenta Records in a deal that granted him one percent of his record sales. He discarded salsa and merengue from his repertoire, recording and performing exclusively cuarteto. His first release with the label, Lo Mejor del Amor, became an instant radio hit, earning him national fame and an ACE Award for Best Musical Act. The success was followed by La Leyenda Continúa (certified gold by CAPIF) and Cuarteteando. His 1999 release A 2000 became the theme of a series of concerts begun in the Astral Theater and held the following year in the Luna Park Arena under the name of Cuarteto Característico Rodrigo A 2000 ("Characteristic Cuarteto, Rodrigo to 2000"). The show sold out the stadium thirteen times, while the album A 2000 was certified quadruple platinum.

Bueno's schedule at the time included twenty-five to thirty shows weekly. Due to his demanding tours, Bueno began consuming beer to excess, which began to interfere with his performing. His stress levels were further increased by receiving multiple death threats. Following a concert at the nightclub Escándalo in La Plata, Bueno was returning to the city of Buenos Aires on the evening of 24 June 2000. After his path was blocked by another driver who had passed him on the turnpike, Bueno tried to chase the vehicle to move in front of it again. In the process, he lost control of his SUV and crashed against a barrier. He was ejected from the SUV and was killed instantly. His death caused an immediate sensation in the Argentine media, with speculation about a possible murder conspiracy. After a short trial, the driver of the other vehicle was found not guilty; the judge considered Bueno to have been responsible for driving imprudently.

== Career ==
=== Early life and beginnings in music ===
Rodrigo Alejandro Bueno was born on 24 May 1973, in Córdoba, Argentina, as the first of three brothers. His father, Eduardo Alberto Bueno, was a record store owner and music producer for Columbia Records as well as BMG, a subsidiary of Sony Music Entertainment. His mother, Beatriz Olave, was a newsstand owner and songwriter. Growing up, Bueno was influenced by the cuarteto scene. He made his first television appearance at the age of two on the show Fiesta del Cuarteto; he appeared with an acquaintance of the family, Juan Carlos "La Mona" Jiménez. Jiménez would later become his main musical influence, along with the bands Cuarteto de Oro, Berna and La Leo. During family meetings, Bueno would sing their songs for his relatives into a wooden microphone, a gift from his carpenter uncle.

At the age of five, with the help of his father, he recorded his first album, Disco Baby. One of the songs from the set, a cover of a María Elena Walsh song, was used as the opening theme of the children's show Carozo y Narizota, broadcast on El Trece (Channel 13) in Argentina.

Growing up, Bueno worked as a paperboy at the newsstand of his grandmother, Hortensia. In 1984, he attended concerts of the local band Chébere and was occasionally invited to join them on stage. The next year, he dropped out of school and started working at his father's record shop, where he sometimes sang for the customers. A friend of his father belonged to the local band Manto Negro and offered Rodrigo a spot in the band. This is where he formally started his career in music, signing his first contract and earning his first salary as a musician at age thirteen. Bueno had written songs since the age of ten, but he would not show them to his colleagues because of his grammar mistakes.

=== Becoming a soloist and rise to fame ===
As Rodrigo failed to achieve success in Córdoba after five years with Manto Negro, his father and manager Eduardo decided to launch Rodrigo's career as a soloist in Buenos Aires. In 1990, he published his debut album, La Foto de tu Cuerpo, through Polygram Records. Although he described himself as a "cuarteto fan", his first album had a rock style. In 1991, he published his next album, Aprendiendo a Vivir, which he promoted with his first appearance in Buenos Aires at the nightclub Fantástico Bailable. The success of his performance propelled the sales of the record and gained Bueno the acknowledgement of the tropical music scene. It was followed by Completamente Enamorado, Muy Bueno and Made in Argentina, which met with moderate success. In 1993, his father died of a heart attack in Bueno's arms prior to a concert where he would promote his new release La Joya. Bueno was forced to perform and later considered retiring.

"Lo Mejor del Amor"
The title-track of Bueno's 1996 album. The popularity of the recordings propelled Bueno to achieve national fame in Argentina.

After six months of mourning, he returned with Made in Córdoba. As his popularity in Buenos Aires was rising, he left Polygram Records and signed a contract with Sony Music. During his short stint with the company, he recorded Sabroso, composed of salsa and merengue songs. Despite Bueno's rising popularity, the recording executives still did not believe he could become a major success. After experimenting with salsa and merengue, then performing as a Crooner, he shifted his style and repertoire entirely to cuarteto. The songs from his first album release under Magenta Records, Lo Mejor del Amor, became major radio hits that propelled him to national fame and earned him an ACE Award for Best Musical Act from the Argentine Association of Entertainment Journalists. In 1997, he published La Leyenda Continua, recorded live at Fantástico Bailable. The record was later certified gold by the Argentine Chamber of Phonograms and Videograms Producers. The success of those albums was followed by Cuarteteando, which included the hit songs "Ocho Cuarenta" and "Y voló, voló". La Leyenda Continúa and Cuarteteando sold 60,000 copies each.

=== Cuarteto Característico Rodrigo A 2000 live performances ===
In December 1999, Bueno published the album A 2000, which he promoted with a series of four sold-out concerts at the Astral Theater on Corrientes Avenue, the city's entertainment and cultural center. Bueno began 2000 with a major tour of Argentina's main summer spots on its Atlantic Coast. He performed 49 concerts in nine days, including one in front of more than 100,000 people in the tourist hotspot of Mar del Plata. Following the success of the show at the Astral Theater, Bueno presented a series of concerts called Cuarteto Característico Rodrigo A 2000 (Characteristic Cuarteto, Rodrigo to 2000) in the Luna Park Arena starting on 5 April 2000.

"Amor Clasificado"
Part of the album A 2000, the song was performed by Bueno during his concerts at the Luna Park

The only rehearsal was performed with the band Cuarteto Leo, held in the club Mundo Bailable, owned by his manager Jose Luis Gozalo. Gozalo invested ARS80,000 (equivalent to US$149,600 in 2025) in publicity, while he requested Tito Lectoure, the owner of the arena, to advance him ARS50,000 (equivalent to US$93,500 in 2025) from the ticket sales to pay previous debts. The show was also financed by the alfajor manufacturer Jorgito and the bus company Flecha Bus, while the wardrobe was provided by Ona Sáez. Due to the venue's fame for hosting boxing matches, the concerts were conceptualized with boxing elements. Bueno performed dressed in boxing trunks and made his entrance to the stage wearing a robe and walking through a hall in the crowd to the ring-themed stage, emulating a boxing match. With an estimated length of two-and-a-half hours, the show included original songs, as well as classics of the cuarteto genre as a tribute to his early influence Cuarteto Leo.

Gozalo negotiated the broadcast of the first concert with Azul Televisión. The filming of subsequent performances was halted by the Kirovsky brothers, owners of Magenta Records. The brothers sent a cease and desist order to the channel, claiming that Magenta owned Bueno's personality rights. The sold-out event, originally scheduled for eight performances, was extended to a total of thirteen sold-out concerts grossing a total of ARS1.3 million. (equivalent to US$2,000,000 in 2025). Meanwhile, the album A 2000 was certified quadruple platinum by CAPIF, selling 750,000 copies.

In addition to the show, Bueno was also performing an estimated twenty-five to thirty concerts per week, including nightclubs, television and other concerts. On 8 April, he received the keys to the city of Formosa after having offered a concert in spite of the celebrations of its 121st anniversary. Due to the effort that the appearances required, Bueno starting drinking beer to excess. His stress was also increased by multiple death threats, including a gang shooting near his house in Córdoba. He also received a bullet with his name engraved on it, according to recollections by Joaquín Levinton, lead singer of the band Turf.

His personal profits at the time came from receiving 1% royalties on an estimated ARS9 million (equivalent to US$17,000,000 in 2025) in record sales, as well as an additional ARS600,000 (equivalent to US$1,122,000 in 2025) for album re-editions and ARS500,000 (equivalent to US$935,000 in 2025) for a merchandise deal with Torneos y Competencias. Affected by his lifestyle and by disputes with Magenta Records, Bueno announced his impending retirement on 11 April 2000. He detailed that he would finish his scheduled concerts, including a Christmas tour throughout the United States. His last live performance, scheduled to take place at the Estadio Monumental Antonio Vespucio Liberti, was to be released as his final album entitled Adiós Rodrigo. Bueno added that he would become a record producer and move to the United States.

== Death ==
=== Background ===
On 23 June 2000, at 20:00, Bueno attended a taping of La Biblia y el Calefón hosted by Jorge Guinzburg on Canal 13. When the show ended at 22:45, Bueno went to the restaurant El Corralón in Buenos Aires' Palermo neighborhood, where he dined with his family, Fernando Olmedo (son of the comedian Alberto Olmedo) and comedian Pepe Parada. Olmedo remarked that he had never seen one of Bueno's shows, and Bueno invited him to a show that same night at the club Escándalo in La Plata. Bueno gave a two-and-a-half-hour performance in front of an audience of 2,000. When the concert was over, he was asked to stay at the club to rest, but Bueno refused, expressing his desire to drive.

=== Accident ===
In the early hours of 24 June, after the show in La Plata, Bueno was driving back to Buenos Aires in a Ford Explorer SUV with his ex-wife, Patricia Pacheco; his son, Ramiro; Fernando Olmedo; musician Jorge Moreno; and radio host Alberto Pereyra. According to eyewitness accounts, after stopping at a toll booth in the Hudson area of the Buenos Aires – La Plata Highway at between 0330 and 0345, Bueno's path was blocked by a white Chevrolet K5 Blazer four-wheel drive with tinted windows. In anger, Bueno started chasing the Blazer. He tried to pass it by closing onto it with the front of his SUV. After brushing the side of the Blazer, he lost control of his Explorer and crashed against a highway barrier. The SUV tumbled 400 meters (1,300 ft) and the driver's door and left back door opened. Bueno and Olmedo, who were not wearing seat belts, were thrown from the car around kilometer 24.5–25 of the highway. Bueno died at the scene. Olmedo died afterwards at Evita Pueblo Hospital. The other passengers were not seriously injured in the crash.

Bueno's remains were taken to Lanús, where he was scheduled to perform that Saturday night, and where he was later declared an "Illustrious Citizen" by mayor Manuel Quindimil. His funeral took place there. An estimated 20,000 mourners passed his body and police presence was granted after minor incidents took place. A helicopter and 400 police officers were deployed, while six medical units were dispatched to assist a number of fans that fainted. Along with other famous singers who died at the same age, he became part of the 27 Club.

=== Controversy, investigation of the accident and initial reaction ===
Bueno was booked to appear on Saturday on the show Siempre Sábado. Instead, his band played in the show as a tribute without anybody singing. Conspiracy theories surfaced claiming that Bueno's death was linked to a "Bailanta Mafia" and that he received death threats in the days prior to the accident. Bueno's mother did not attend his funeral, but she appeared on the show and said that the question of accident versus murder would soon be clarified.

The forensic report stated that he died of "cranioencephalic trauma". Luis Armelo, the correctional prosecutor of Quilmes called the case a homicidio culposo con lesiones (negligent homicide with injuries). The 1st Police Precinct of Berazategui identified the driver of the Chevrolet Blazer as Alfredo Pesquera, a local businessman. The next year, Pesquera was taken to trial. The prosecutor alleged that his maneuver eventually led to the death of Bueno and requested a thirteen-year sentence. In December 2001, Ariel González Eli Abe and Margarita Allaza de Iturburu, members of the 2nd Criminal Tribunal of Quilmes, concluded that the death of Bueno was caused by his own unsafe driving. Pesquera was declared innocent and released. Following Bueno's death, four teen fans committed suicide. The sales of his records and merchandise skyrocketed. Bueno sold 500,000 records during his lifetime, and the sales quintupled a month after his death, with his last album selling more than a million copies. The records grossed a total of ARS15 million (equivalent to US$27,000,000 in 2025), three times the total amount that he made during his career. Reruns of his concerts garnered large audiences when they were broadcast on television stations such as Azul Televisión, América 2 and Crónica TV.

A series of tribute albums was released in the subsequent months by the companies owning his catalogs. His band divided into La Banda del Potro, represented by Leader Music, and Auténtica Banda de Rodrigo, represented by Magenta Records. Both bands released 11 albums, grossing a total of ARS1 million (equivalent to US$2,000,000 in 2025). In 2000, while Bueno's popularity was soaring in Buenos Aires, consulting agency Delfos found that among people in Córdoba, 72% preferred the music of "La Mona" Jiménez while 15% preferred Bueno. The following year, Jiménez was listed at 46%, while the numbers for Bueno increased to 40%.

In 2011, a new theory surfaced after the newspaper Crónica spoke to the police about the cause of the accident. The police source mentioned the possibility that Rodrigo's intensive routine might have increased the production of adrenaline in his body. The investigators explained that, if Rodrigo did not release the excess adrenaline through urination after his last concert, he could have lost his sense of distance in relation to Pesquera's Blazer. This could have caused Rodrigo to apply the brake and turn the wheel violently.

=== Lawsuits over the estate and burial ===
Initially Bueno's mother claimed to be the absolute owner of his recorded material as well as profits. Judge Ricardo Sangiorg of the 76th Civil Court froze all of the assets held in bank accounts and copyrighted material hosted by SADAIC and the Argentine Musician's Union, as requested by the legal group Cúneo Libarona-Ballester, the representatives of Patricia Pacheco and her son Ramiro. Pacheco claimed that Ramiro Pacheco was the legitimate son of Bueno and requested a DNA test to verify it. The lawyers sent legal notices to Olave, her lawyer Miguel Angel Pierri and Gozalo stating that none of the assets of Bueno's estate could be used or spent until it was decided which one of the parties would inherit them.

The DNA tests confirmed that Ramiro Pacheco was the son of Bueno and his surname was changed. Rodrigo's account at Credicoop Bank contained US$300,000, but it was emptied by his brother Ulises before it was blocked by Judge Sangiorg. The copyright holdings could not be transferred to Ramiro Bueno, since the original compositions of his father as well as other assets were registered on his behalf under the name of Ulises. Beatriz Olave negotiated deals over the image of Bueno for use on the jersey of the soccer team Club Atlético Belgrano.

The disposition of Rodrigo's body became a subject of dispute. A possible cremation and transport of the ashes to the Córdoba province was denied by judicial authorities in case a future autopsy was needed. The idea of a burial at the Lanús Municipal Cemetery was rejected by his mother due to concerns about vandalism. Instead, she decided to place the body in Las Praderas Cemetery in Monte Grande. Since the investigation into Bueno's death was still open and further tests might be performed, his body was placed in a container by the Justice Ministry. In 2005, five years after his death, the case was closed and the burial was authorized. The body was placed in a marble mausoleum. His mother, manager and friends attended a memorial service where they placed a trophy over the marble grave, symbolizing the appreciation of his relatives, fans and friends.

== Legacy ==
Bueno spread cuarteto, originally a typical genre from the Córdoba Province, to a national level. Shortly after his death on the 27th kilometer of the Buenos Aires-La Plata Highway, fans built a "sanctuary" memorial including a statue as a tribute. An estimated crowd of 15,000 fans gathered there on the first anniversary of his death in 2001. The memorial suffered several attacks through the years for unclear reasons. One year after his death, Sony Records released the album Todos Juntos con Rodrigo, which includes the original songs from Sabroso with added vocals from Argentine and international singers such as Celia Cruz and Luciano Pereyra. It soon went gold in Argentina with sales of 30,000 records. The same year, he posthumously received two Carlos Gardel Awards. He received Best Male Tropical Performer for the album A 2000 and Song of the Year for his original "Soy Cordobés".

In 1999, Bueno introduced cuarteto singer Walter Olmos to the public scene with performances in several of his concerts in the Buenos Aires province. After Bueno's death, Olmos was popularly regarded as his musical heir, but he only enjoyed brief success before his death while playing Russian roulette in 2002.

Rodrigo, La Película (Rodrigo, The Movie) opened on 12 April 2001, at a record 136 Argentine theaters. The movie depicts a love story involving a teenage girl (portrayed by Agustina Cherri) who idolized the singer and deals with Rodrigo's death amid a relationship with a teenage boy (Guillermo Pfening). The movie contains montage of real concerts and songs as background. The film was not as successful as anticipated, however, and was regarded by some as an attempt to make a profit out of the memory of the singer. The entertainment magazine Sin Cortes described it as a "failed film" that "took advantage of the Rodrigo phenomena".

Bueno, a Club Atlético Belgrano fan, is still regarded as an important figure within the club's fan base. A group of fans visited his mausoleum in 2011 on the 11th anniversary of his death. The team's jersey depicted his face as a tribute during the 2002–03 season of Argentina's Football First Division. In 2012, the club's administration decided to raise funds to build a bronze statue of the singer to be placed in Gigante de Alberdi Stadium.

In 2010, on the tenth anniversary of his death, the Buenos Aires Chamber of Deputies declared him as a salient personality of popular culture in the province. Bueno was the subject of tributes on Argentine television, including one from the show Gracias por Venir, which was attended by some of his relatives and close friends.

A tribute concert was performed on 16 January 2013, during the opening of the first Cuarteto Carnival, based on the Bahian Carnival. During the Newsstand Day (Día del Canillita) celebrations, Governor of Córdoba José Manuel de la Sota announced his plans to commission a statue of Bueno. It was placed on the Buen Pastor esplanade, and unveiled prior to the Cuarteto Carnival tribute concert. In 2014, another statue was erected to commemorate the fourteenth anniversary of Bueno's death. The bronx-made sculpture was financed by the City of Buenos Aires, and placed in front of the disco Fantastico Bailable, in the Once neighborhood. The ceremony was conducted by Bueno's friend and television host Daniel "Tota" Santillan. The attendance included Deputy Mayor María Eugenia Vidal and Cabinet Chief Horacio Rodríguez Larreta; Bueno's family, business associates and his fans.

A villa miseria in Buenos Aires' Costanera Sur Ecological Reserve was named after him. In January 2015 a new Rodrigo statue was unveiled. Located at the entrance of El Corralón restaurant, the figure featured the singer dressed with the boxer outfit he wore during his Luna Park performances.

In October 2018, the biography film of Bueno, El Potro. Lo mejor del amor, directed and co-written by Lorena Muñoz, was released to mixed reviews. Bueno's son, Ramiro gave the rights to make the movie and collaborated with director Muñoz to write the script, which was criticized by some family members including Bueno's mother, Beatriz Olave and brother Ulises Bueno for failing to tell his story as it really was.

== Music style and image ==
I don't think I'm a good singer, but I tell stories. I want to leave a message, to transmit the people's testimony for their stories to be heard.

— Rodrigo Bueno, 2000

Bueno's band was a typical cuarteto band, composed of fourteen musicians. Percussion predominated, with a main drummer and additional timbales, complemented by an accordion and an electric organ. The vocal part of the band featured a male quartet as a chorus.

Characterized by his "raspy and strong" voice and charismatic on-stage performances, Bueno became an instant success on the Argentine musical scene. His image differed from that of other tropical music bands that wore bright colors and had long, curly hair. Bueno's hair was short, dyed usually in blue, turquoise, red or violet. He wore fitted shirts with jeans and cowboy boots. He was known for his mixture of facial gestures and poses that accompanied his bravado image. Bueno was heavily involved with the creative process of his act. He produced his own records, wrote his own songs and designed the visuals for his shows, including the looks of the stage and graphic campaigns, such as flyers and posters.

== Personal life ==
Bueno was married twice and had two children. In 1992, he married Mariana Marcone of Uruguay; they had a daughter the next year. The marriage lasted only a couple of months after the birth. His son Ramiro was born in 1997 during his brief second marriage to Patricia Pacheco. Bueno's cousin, Juan Carlos Olave, is a professional footballer.

== Discography ==
Year	Album	Chart peak position (CAPIF top albums)	Label
1990	La Foto de tu Cuerpo	–	Polygram Records
1991	Aprendiendo a Vivir	–	Polygram Records
1992	Muy Bueno	5	Polygram Records
1993	Made in Argentina	–	Polygram Records
1993	Made in Córdoba	–	Polygram Records
1994	Completamente Enamorado	–	Polygram Records
1995	Sabroso	–	Sony Music
1996	Lo Mejor del Amor	–	Magenta Records
1997	La Leyenda Continúa	6	Magenta Records
1998	Cuarteteando	4	Magenta Records
1999	El Potro	–	Magenta Records
1999	A 2000	1	Magenta Records
2000	La Mano de Dios	1	Magenta Records
2000	Derroche	–	Magenta Records

== Music videos ==
Year	Video	Album release
1991	"La Chica del Ascensor"	Muy Bueno
1992	"Completamente Enamorado"	Completamente Enamorado
1995	"De Enero a Enero"	Sabroso
1996	"El Himno del Cucumelo"	Lo Mejor del Amor
2000	"Derroche" (posthumous)	Derroche
2000	"La Mano de Dios" (posthumous)	La Mano de Dios
