= El Potro: Unstoppable =

- Film poster
- El Potro, lo mejor del amor
- Directed by: Lorena Muñoz
- Written by: Lorena Muñoz; Tamara Viñes
- Starring: Rodrigo Romero; Florencia Peña; Fernán Mirás
- Distributed by: Netflix
- Release date: October 4, 2018
- Running time: 122 minutes
- Country: Argentina
- Language: Spanish

El Potro: Unstoppable (Spanish: El Potro, lo mejor del amor) is a 2018 Argentine biographical musical drama film directed by Lorena Muñoz and written by Lorena Muñoz and Tamara Viñes. It is based on the life and career of cuarteto singer Rodrigo “El Potro” Bueno, from his rise to fame as an icon in the Argentine tropical music scene in the 90s to his death in 2000.

== Cast ==
- Rodrigo Romero as Rodrigo
- Florencia Peña as Betty Olave
- Fernán Mirás as Oso
- Daniel Aráoz as Eduardo "Pichín" Bueno
- Jimena Barón as Marixa Balli
- Malena Sánchez as Patricia "Pato" Pacheco
- Diego Cremonesi as Ángel
- Julieta Vallina as Rodrigo's aunt
- Simja Dujov as Rodrigo's band musician
- Luis Mario Altamirano as Rodrigo's band musician
- Ramiro Bueno as Rodrigo's band musician
