= Chébere =

Chébere is a cuarteto band from Argentina formed in 1973.

The name follows the Venezuelan dialect term "chévere" for something good. Chébere was founded by Eduardo “Pato” Lugones (leader), Hugo “Huesito” Terragni (violin), Angel “Negro” Videla (piano), Alberto “Beto” Guillen (double bass), Alberto Pizzichini (accordion) with Daniel “Sebastián” Reyna (singer). Their first live performance was in 1974 in Córdoba.

Other musicians have played with the band, including the young Rodrigo who informally joined the band for live performances.
