= La Mona Jiménez =

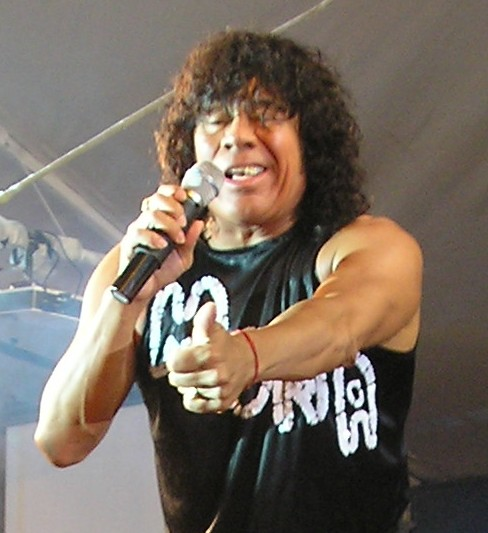
- Mona Jiménez in La Falda (2008).

Background information
- Born: Juan Carlos Jiménez Ruffino; 11 January 1951 (age 75); Córdoba, Argentina
- Genre: Cuarteto
- Occupations: Singer-songwriter, musician
- Website: Official website

Juan Carlos Jiménez Rufino (born 11 January 1951), known as La Mona Jiménez, is a cuarteto singer and songwriter, heralded as one of the most prominent performers of the genre.

== Early life ==
Juan Carlos Jiménez Rufino was born on 11 January 1951 in Córdoba, Argentina. He is of Afro-Argentine descent. He earned the nickname La Mona ("the she-monkey") from his parents, who noted his resemblance to Cheeta the Chimpanzee from the Tarzan TV series.

== Musical career ==
He started singing with Cuarteto Berna when he was 15 years old after winning a contest among 40 other singers. With this group he recorded five albums.

His first hit was La flaca Marta ("Skinny Marta") from the album Para toda América ("For All America"), released in 1984. His success allowed him to buy three brand-new cars and a house in the barrio of Cerro de Las Rosas, and to pay off a mortgage.

In 40 years of musical career Jiménez has recorded more than 85 CDs and sold more than 36 million copies all over Argentina. His 62nd CD, titled Beso a beso con La Mona ("From kiss to kiss with La Mona") sold more than one hundred thousand copies just in Córdoba. He received the Platinum Konex Award for best Cuarteto soloist/band of the 1985–1995 decade in 1995 and of the 1995–2005 decade in 2005.

He has two daughters, Lorena and Natalia, and a son, Carli, who is also a cuarteto musician.

== Sociocultural Impact and Collective Identity ==
During the 1980s, Jiménez introduced a significant paradigm shift in the cuarteto genre by deliberately incorporating themes of collective identity and working-class marginalization into his discography. His lyrical and musical arrangements transitioned the genre away from commercial escapism, establishing an active device of enunciation for the urban peripheries of Córdoba. Furthermore, his compositions often rely on complex matrices of humor and melodrama as socio-expressive formulas, documenting the structural changes and daily vulnerabilities experienced by local popular sectors.
