= Bailando 2015 =

- Season 2015
- The cast of Bailando 2015
- Presented by: Marcelo Tinelli

Release
- Original network: El Trece
- Original release: 11 May – 21 December 2015

Season chronology
- ← Previous; Bailando 2014 Next → Bailando 2016

Bailando 2015 is the tenth season of Argentine TV dance competition Bailando por un Sueño. The season premiere was aired on 11 May 2015, and was hosted by Marcelo Tinelli.

In this season the jury consisted of five returning judges: Nacha Guevara, Moria Casán, Soledad Silveyra, and Marcelo Polino and newcomer Ángel de Brito.

== Couples ==
Celebrity	Professional Partner or Celebrity	Status	Ref.
Gladys Florimonte; Actress & Comedian	Maximiliano D'iorio	Eliminated 1st on 29 May 2015	
Anita Martínez; Comedian	Marcos "Bicho" Gómez; Comedian	Withdrew on 12 June 2015	
Agustina Kämpfer; Journalist	Emanuel González	Eliminated 2nd on 29 June 2015	
Carlos "Negro" Alvarez; Comedian	Melina Greco	Withdrew on 13 July 2015	
Marcela Tauro; Journalist	Pier Fritzsche	Eliminated 3rd on 14 July 2015	
Luciano "Tirri" Giugno; Musician & Marcelo Tinelli's cousin	Noelia Marzol; Dancer & actress	Eliminated 4th on 30 July 2015	
Alberto Samid; Businessman & Politician	Sofia Macaggi	Eliminated 5th on 10 August 2015	
Verónica Ojeda; Diego Maradona's former girlfriend	Nicolás Scillama	Eliminated 6th on 24 August 2015	
Nito Artaza; Former Senator	Silvina Scheffler; TV Personality	Eliminated 7th on 8 September 2015	
Nazarena Vélez; Actress	Maximiliano D'iorio	Eliminated 8th on 21 September 2015	
Carmen Barbieri; Vedette, Actress & Dancer	Rodrigo Esmella	Withdrew on 29 September 2015	
Florencia De La V Comedian & TV Presenter	Martin Pico	Eliminated 9th on 29 September 2015	
Fernando Burlando; Lawyer & TV personality	Bárbara Franco; Model & TV personality	Eliminated 10th on 8 October 2015	
Juana Viale; Actress	Facundo Arrigoni	Eliminated 11th on 19 October 2015	
Lizy Tagliani; Comedian	Cristian Ponce	Eliminated 12th on 27 October 2015	
Luciana Salazar; ModeL	Jorge Moliniers	Eliminated 13th on 3 November 2015	
Candela Ruggeri; Model & Oscar Ruggeri's daughter	Facundo Insúa	Eliminated 14th on 10 November 2015	
Bárbara Vélez; Actress & Model	Ignacio Pérez	Eliminated 15th on 19 November 2015	
Ergün Demir; Actor	Macarena Rinaldi	Eliminated 16th on 26 November 2015	
Celeste Muriega; Vedette	Joel Ledesma	Eliminated 17th on 1 December 2015	
Martín Campilongo; Comedian	Bárbara Reali	Eliminated 18th on 7 December 2015	
Freddy Villarreal; Comedian	Soledad Bayona	Eliminated 19th on 14 December 2015	
Fernando Dente; Actor, Singer & Dancer	Lourdes Sánchez; Dancer	Eliminated 20th on 15 December 2015	
Gisela Bernal; Dancer	Nicolas Villalba	Semifinalists on 17 December 2015	
Cinthia Fernandez; TV Personality	Gabriel Usandivaras	Semifinalists on 18 December 2015	
Ailén Bechara; Actress & Model	Fernando Bertona	Runners-up on 21 December 2015	
Federico Bal; Actor	Laura Fernández; Dancer	Winners on 21 December 2015	

== Scoring chart ==
Celebrity	Place	01	02	03	04	05	06	07	08	09	10	11	12	13	14	15	16	17	18	19	20	21	SF		F
Celebrity	Place	01	02	03	04	05	06	07	08	09	10	11	12	13	14	15	16	17	18	19	20	21	1	2	F
Federico & Laura	1	40	47	48	38	23	49	39	43	49	35	39	35	36	44	38	40	35	48	45	83	A	7		7
Ailén & Fernando	2	21	33	38	24	21	30	42	34	29	45	18	35	36	33	16	44	28	40	34	83	A		6	1
Cinthia & Gabriel	3	41	46	46	48	43	30	42	45	48	46	49	44	50	42	48	38	48	40	46	90	A		2	
Gisela & Nicolas V.	3	40	37	48	45	49	38	48	44	50	40	50	46	38	42	50	43	50	38	50	94	A	1		
Fernando D. & Lourdes	5	44	36	45	48	47	33	48	37	46	39	41	29	36	42	50	45	48	40	41	99	A			
Freddy & Soledad	6	34	40	42	49	44	50	45	42	29	45	35	49	50	37	42	25	46	29	39	83				
Martín C. & Bárbara R.	7	45	41	45	44	21	48	41	37	29	35	35	39	38	33	43	35	43	43	27					
Celeste & Joel	8	39	37	44	42	42	44	31	36	44	37	35	29	43	44	49	35	33	38						
Ergün & Macarena	9	27	27	33	32	23	41	24	40	21	20	27	36	36	25	35	25	17							
Bárbara V. & Ignacio	10	29	35	23	32	21	36	24	30	39	31	35	37	40	33	41	38								
Candela & Facundo I.	11	32	40	46	39	30	48	31	32	44	40	38	29	39	37	35									
Luciana & Jorge	12	33	39	41	40	39	41	39	41	43	36	36	40	46	(*)										
Lizy & Cristian	13	30	41	41	41	36	39	42	32	41	41	39	29	33											
Juana & Facundo A.	14	34	38	48	36	33	43	36	43	44	20	49	22												
Fernando B. & Bárbara F.	15	21	30	30	40	33	30	43	46	42	40	27													
Carmen & Rodrigo	N/A	44	42	34	24	41	47	41	34	29	42														
Florencia & Martín P.	16	34	38	35	35	26	34	45	43	46	35														
Nazarena & Maximiliano	17	32	32	30	24	33	33	31	34	39															
Nito & Silvina	18	35	23	31	32	26	42	35	30																
Verónica & Nicolás S.	19	24	27	38	34	26	33	35																	
Alberto & Sofía	20	21	30	33	19	29	16																		
Luciano & Noelia	21	31	12	21	33	26																			
Marcela & Pier	22	21	27	27	28																				
Carlos & Melina	N/A	25	32	23	14																				
Agustina & Emanuel	23	23	31	21																					
Anita & Bicho	N/A	37	31																						
Gladys & Maximiliano	24	18																							

Red numbers Indicate the lowest score for each week.
Green numbers Indicate the highest score for each week.
Indicates the couple sentenced.
Indicates the couple was saved by the judges.
Indicates the couple was saved by the public.
indicates the couple was saved by production.
Indicates the couple eliminated that week.
Indicates the couple withdrew.
Indicates that the couple was disqualified by decision of production.
Indicates the winning couple.
Indicates the runner-up couple.
Indicates the semifinalists couples.

- (*) In round 14, Luciana Salazar could not dance due to injury.

=== Highest and lowest scoring performances ===
The best and worst performances in each dance according to the judges' marks are as follows:

Dance	Best dancer(s)	Best score	Worst dancer(s)	Worst score
Disco	Martín Campilongo	45	Gladys Florimonte	18
Cumbia	Federico Bal	47	Luciano Tirri & Noelia Marzol	12
Street Pop	Federico Bal; Gisela Bernal; Juana Viale	48	Luciano Tirri & Noelia Marzol; Agustina Kämpfer	21
Reggaeton	Freddy Villarreal	49	Alberto Samid	19
Ballet	Gisela Bernal	49	Ailén Bechara; Martín Campilongo; Bárbara Vélez	21
Freestyle I	Freddy Villarreal	50	Alberto Samid	16
Folklore	Gisela Bernal; Fernando Dente	48	Ergün Demir; Bárbara Vélez	24
Bachata	Fernando Burlando & Bárbara Franco	46	Nito Artaza & Silvina Scheffler; Bárbara Vélez	30
Salsa	Gisela Bernal	50	Ergün Demir	21
Cuarteto	Cinthia Fernández	46	Ergün Demir; Juana Viale	20
Adagio	Gisela Bernal	50	Ailén Bechara	18
VideoClip	Freddy Villarreal	49	Juana Viale	22
Aqua Dance	Cinthia Fernández; Freddy Villarreal	50	Lizy Tagliani	33
Latin pop	Federico Bal; Celeste Muriega	44	Ergün Demir	25
Tango or Milonga	Fernando Dente; Gisela Bernal	50	Ailén Bechara	16
Improvised dance	Fernando Dente	45	Ergün Demir; Freddy Villarreal	25
Freestyle II	Gisela Bernal	50	Ergün Demir	17
K-pop	Federico Bal	48	Freddy Villareal	29
Rock Acrobatic	Gisela Bernal	50	Martín Campilongo	27
Street Pop Merengue	Fernando Dente	99	Freddy Villareal; Ailén Bechara; Federico Bal	83

== Styles, scores and songs ==
Individual judges' scores in the charts below are listed in this order from left to right: Ángel de Brito, Nacha Guevara, Moria Casán, Soledad Silveyra, Marcelo Polino.

- Secret vote is in **bold text**.

=== Week 1 ===
Disco
Date	Celebrity	Song	Score					Total
Date	Celebrity	Song	ÁDB	NG	MC	SS	MP	Total
12 May	Ergün Demir	Jamiroquai – "Canned Heat"	4	6	7	8	2	27
13 May	Florencia De La V	Gloria Estefan – "Turn The Beat Around"	7	8	7	7	5	34
13 May	Verónica Ojeda	Kylie Minogue – "Celebration"	5	6	5	6	2	24
13 May	Fernando Dente & Lourdes Sánchez	Mark Ronson ft. Bruno Mars – "Uptown Funk (Remix)"	10	9	9	10	6	44
15 May	Nazarena Vélez	Bruno Mars – "Treasure"	6	7	7	7	5	32
15 May	Gisela Bernal	Atomic Kitten – "Ladies' Night"	10	8	8	9	5	40
15 May	Gladys Florimonte	Cher – "Strong Enough"	1	5	5	6	1	**18**
18 May	Juana Viale	Lady Gaga – "Just Dance (Remix)"	7	8	6	8	5	34
18 May	Lizy Tagliani	David Guetta ft. Akon – "Sexy Bitch (Remix)"	6	7	6	6	5	30
18 May	Freddy Villarreal	Michael Jackson ft. Justin Timberlake – "Love Never Felt So Good"	5	8	8	8	5	34
19 May	Carmen Barbieri	Alan Menken – "Take Me To Heaven"	10	7	9	10	8	44
19 May	Cinthia Fernandez	Earth, Wind & Fire – "Boogie Wonderland"	9	8	9	9	6	41
21 May	Alberto Samid	Donna Summer – "Hot Stuff"	5	2	8	4	2	21
21 May	Marcela Tauro	Mika – "Love Today"	3	5	5	4	4	21
22 May	Bárbara Vélez	Atomic Kitten – "Be With You"	5	7	6	6	5	29
22 May	Martín Campilongo	Village People – "Can't Stop the Music"	10	9	10	10	6	**45**
22 May	Candela Ruggeri	Maroon 5 – "Moves Like Jagger"	8	6	8	6	4	32
25 May	Luciana Salazar	Gloria Estefan – "Everlasting Love"	4	7	7	9	6	33
25 May	Federico Bal & Laura Fernández	DJ Cassidy ft. Robin Thicke & Jessie J – "Calling All Hearts"	9	8	8	9	6	40
25 May	Carlos "Negro" Alvarez	Daft Punk – "Get Lucky"	1	6	8	9	1	25
25 May	Ailén Bechara	Gloria Gaynor – "Can't Take My Eyes Off You"	4	3	5	6	3	24
26 May	Anita Martínez & Marcos "Bicho" Gómez	Glee Cast – "Da Ya Think I'm Sexy?"	7	8	6	10	6	37
26 May	Fernando Burlando & Bárbara Franco	Pussycat Dolls – "Hush Hush"	4	5	7	5	0	21
28 May	Luciano "Tirri" Giugno & Noelia Marzol	Robin Thicke ft. T.I. & Pharrell Williams – "Blurred Lines"	5	7	7	8	4	31
28 May	Agustina Kämpfer	Donna Summer – "Last Dance"	2	4	5	8	4	23
28 May	Celeste Muriega	Scissor Sisters – "Any Which Way"	8	8	8	9	6	39
29 May	Nito Artaza & Silvina Scheffler	Kym Mazelle – "Young Hearts Run Free"	7	7	8	8	5	35

- Sentenced: Gladys Florimonte **(18)**, Alberto Samid **(21)**, Marcela Tauro **(21)**, Ailén Bechara **(21)**, Fernando Burlando & Bárbara Franco **(21)**, Agustina Kämpfer **(23)**
- Saved by the jury: Ailén Bechara, Fernando Burlando & Bárbara Franco, Marcela Tauro, Agustina Kämpfer
- Saved by the public: Alberto Samid **(54.25%)**
- Eliminated: Gladys Florimonte **(45.75%)**

=== Week 2 ===
Cumbia
Date	Celebrity	Song	Score					Total
Date	Celebrity	Song	ÁDB	NG	MC	SS	MP	Total
1 June	Ergün Demir	Grupo Play – "Te quiero"	4	7	**4**	8	4	27
1 June	Florencia De La V	El Apache Ness ft. Juan Quin & Dago – "Mueve el totó"	7	8	**7**	9	7	38
1 June	Marcela Tauro	Ráfaga – "La luna y tú"	2	6	**7**	7	5	27
2 June	Cinthia Fernandez	Américo – "Te vas"	10	9	**10**	10	7	46
2 June	Martín Campilongo	Damas Gratis – "Se te ve la tanga"	7	7	**10**	10	7	41
2 June	Fernando Dente & Lourdes Sánchez	Los Totora – "Márchate ahora"	10	7	**7**	8	4	36
4 June	Carmen Barbieri	Lía Crucet – "La güera Salomé"	10	9	**7**	9	7	42
4 June	Federico Bal & Laura Fernández	Nene Malo – "Bailan rochas y chetas"	10	10	**10**	10	7	**47**
4 June	Gisela Bernal	Agapornis – "Volverte a ver"	6	9	**7**	10	4	37
4 June	Freddy Villarreal	Ráfaga – "Agüita"	8	9	**8**	8	7	40
5 June	Anita Martínez & Marcos "Bicho" Gómez	Agapornis - "Hasta el final"	6	8	—	10	7	31
5 June	Candela Ruggeri	Agapornis – "Por amarte así"	9	9	**8**	9	5	40
5 June	Carlos "Negro" Alvarez	Los Palmeras – "Bombón asesino"	4	6	**8**	10	4	32
5 June	Lizy Tagliani	Gilda – "No me arrepiento de este amor"	8	9	**8**	9	7	41
8 June	Luciano "Tirri" Giugno & Noelia Marzol	Nene Malo – "Chetos y cumbieros"	2	2	**4**	4	0	**12**
8 June	Luciana Salazar	Karina – "Fuera"	9	7	**7**	9	7	39
8 June	Celeste Muriega	El Villano – "Te pintaron pajaritos"	8	7	**8**	8	6	37
9 June	Juana Viale	Karina – "Corazón mentiroso"	8	8	**7**	9	6	38
9 June	Fernando Burlando & Bárbara Franco	Gladys la bomba tucumana – "La pollera amarilla"	4	5	**7**	9	5	30
9 June	Nito Artaza & Silvina Scheffler	Ráfaga – "Maldito corazón"	3	5	**5**	6	4	23
11 June	Nazarena Vélez	Gilda – "Se me ha perdido un corazón"	3	8	**5**	9	7	32
11 June	Verónica Ojeda	Karina – "Nunca voy a olvidarte"	6	7	**5**	7	2	27
11 June	Alberto Samid	Ráfaga – "Ritmo de cumbia"	4	6	**7**	7	5	30
12 June	Bárbara Vélez	Grupo Play ft. VI-EM – "Quiero verte bailar"	6	8	**7**	8	6	35
12 June	Agustina Kämpfer	Gilda – "Paisaje"	3	5	**7**	9	7	31
12 June	Ailén Bechara	Gilda – "Corazón valiente"	4	8	**7**	8	6	33

- Sentenced: Luciano "Tirri" Giugno & Noelia Marzol **(12)**, Nito Artaza & Silvina Scheffler **(23)**, Verónica Ojeda **(27)**, Ergün Demir **(27)**, Marcela Tauro **(27)**
- Saved by production: Luciano "Tirri" Giugno & Noelia Marzol, Nito Artaza & Silvina Scheffler, Verónica Ojeda, Ergün Demir, Marcela Tauro
- Withdrew: Anita Martínez & Marcos "Bicho" Gómez

=== Week 3 ===
Street Pop
Date	Celebrity	Song	Score					Total
Date	Celebrity	Song	ÁDB	NG	MC	SS	MP	Total
15 June	Ergün Demir	Ricky Martin – "Come With Me"	6	7	7	9	4	33
15 June	Florencia De La V	Jessie J, Ariana Grande & Nicki Minaj – "Bang Bang"	6	8	8	8	5	35
16 June	Martín Campilongo	Maxi Trusso ft. ToMakeNoise – "S.O.S"	10	9	9	9	8	45
16 June	Cinthia Fernandez	Chris Brown – "Don't Wake Me Up"	9	9	10	10	8	46
16 June	Candela Ruggeri	One Direction – "One Thing"	10	9	10	10	7	46
16 June	Celeste Muriega	Iggy Azalea ft. Charli XCX – "Fancy"	10	8	9	10	7	44
18 June	Carmen Barbieri	Pharrell Williams – "Happy"	4	6	7	9	8	34
18 June	Bárbara Vélez	Taylor Swift – "22"	4	6	4	7	2	23
18 June	Agustina Kämpfer	Pitbull ft. Kesha – "Timber"	1	5	5	8	2	21
19 June	Lizy Tagliani	Katy Perry – "Hot'n'Cold"	10	8	8	8	7	41
19 June	Verónica Ojeda	Nicki Minaj – "Starships"	8	8	8	7	7	38
19 June	Carlos "Negro" Alvarez	Maroon 5 – "Maps"	0	4	10	9	0	23
19 June	Federico Bal & Laura Fernández	Taylor Swift ft. Kendrick Lamar – "Bad Blood"	9	10	10	10	9	**48**
22 June	Luciano "Tirri" Giugno & Noelia Marzol	Meghan Trainor – "Lips Are Movin"	5	4	6	5	1	**21**
22 June	Fernando Burlando & Bárbara Franco	Maroon 5 – "Sugar"	4	7	7	7	5	30
23 June	Juana Viale	Taylor Swift – "Shake It Off"	10	10	10	10	8	**48**
23 June	Fernando Dente & Lourdes Sánchez	Ariana Grande ft. Zedd – "Break Free"	10	8	9	10	8	45
25 June	Nazarena Vélez	Rihanna – "Where Have You Been"	5	7	6	7	5	30
25 June	Alberto Samid	Maxi Trusso – "Nothing At All"	4	7	10	7	5	33
25 June	Nito Artaza & Silvina Scheffler	Katy Perry – "This Is How We Do"	5	7	8	7	4	31
25 June	Ailén Bechara	Justin Bieber ft. Nicki Minaj – "Beauty and a Beat"	10	7	7	8	6	38
26 June	Gisela Bernal	Jessie J ft. 2 Chainz – "Burnin' up"	10	8	10	10	9	**48**
26 June	Luciana Salazar	Taylor Swift – "I Knew You Were Trouble"	9	8	7	10	7	41
26 June	Marcela Tauro	Katy Perry – "Part of Me"	2	7	6	6	6	27
29 June	Freddy Villarreal	Avicii – "Wake Me Up"	8	8	9	10	7	42

- Sentenced: Luciano "Tirri" Giugno & Noelia Marzol **(21)**, Agustina Kämpfer **(21)**, Bárbara Vélez **(23)**, Carlos "Negro" Álvarez **(23)**, Marcela Tauro **(27)**
- Saved by the jury: Bárbara Vélez, Marcela Tauro, Luciano Tirri & Noelia Marzol
- Saved by the public: Carlos "Negro" Álvarez **(56.85%)**
- Eliminated: Agustina Kämpfer **(43.15%)**

=== Week 4 ===
Reggaeton
Date	Celebrity	Song	Score					Total
Date	Celebrity	Song	ÁDB	NG	MC	SS	MP	Total
1 July	Ergün Demir	Daddy Yankee – "Rompe"	**5**	7	7	9	4	32
2 June	Cinthia Fernandez	Daddy Yankee – "Perros salvajes"	**10**	10	10	10	8	48
2 June	Florencia De La V	Calle 13 – "Atrévete-te-te"	**4**	7	9	8	7	35
2 June	Candela Ruggeri	Daddy Yankee ft. Major Lazer – "Watch Out for This (Bumaye)"	**9**	8	8	9	5	39
3 July	Gisela Bernal	Daddy Yankee ft. Fergie – "Impacto"	**10**	9	9	9	8	45
3 July	Lizy Tagliani	Daddy Yankee – "El ritmo no perdona"	**10**	9	7	8	7	41
3 July	Martín Campilongo	Latin Fresh ft. Dj Pablito – "Bata-Bata"	**10**	10	9	10	5	44
3 July	Ailén Bechara	Angel y Khriz – "Na de Na"	**3**	7	6	6	2	24
6 July	Luciano "Tirri" Giugno & Noelia Marzol	Daddy Yankee ft. Wisin & Yandel – "Noche de entierro"	**5**	7	8	8	5	33
6 July	Fernando Dente & Lourdes Sánchez	Wisin & Yandel – "Me estás tentando"	**10**	10	10	10	8	48
6 July	Verónica Ojeda	Wisin & Yandel – "Ahora es"	**6**	8	8	8	4	34
6 July	Marcela Tauro	Maluma ft. Eli Palacios – "La temperatura"	**3**	5	10	5	5	28
7 July	Juana Viale	Angel & Khriz – "Muévela"	**7**	9	8	9	3	36
7 July	Carmen Barbieri	Daddy Yankee – "Descontrol"	**4**	5	6	6	3	24
7 July	Federico Bal & Laura Fernández	Yandel ft. El General Gadiel – "Plakito"	**8**	8	8	9	5	38
9 July	Fernando Burlando & Bárbara Franco	Yaga & Mackie ft. Don Omar – "La batidora"	**6**	9	9	9	7	40
9 July	Bárbara Vélez	Wisin & Yandel – "Pegao"	**9**	6	6	8	3	32
9 July	Nito Artaza & Silvina Scheffler	Daddy Yankee – "King Daddy"	**3**	7	7	8	7	32
10 July	Luciana Salazar	Ricky Martin ft. Daddy Yankee – "Drop It On Me"	**8**	8	8	9	7	40
10 July	Alberto Samid	Don Omar – "Guaya Guaya"	**0**	4	9	6	0	19
10 July	Freddy Villarreal	Daddy Yankee – "Pose"	**9**	10	10	10	10	**49**
10 July	Celeste Muriega	Nicky Jam – "El perdón"	**10**	7	9	8	8	42
13 July	Carlos "Negro" Alvarez	Tiburón Valdéz – "Hasta abajo papi"	—	3	5	4	2	**14**
13 July	Nazarena Vélez	Enrique Iglesias ft. Descemer Bueno & Gente de Zona – "Bailando"	**4**	5	6	6	3	24

- Sentenced: Alberto Samid **(19)**, Ailén Bechara **(24)**, Carmen Barbieri **(24)**, Nazarena Vélez **(24)**, Marcela Tauro **(28)**
- Saved by the jury: Nazarena Vélez, Ailén Bechara, Carmen Barbieri
- Saved by the public: Alberto Samid **(56.79%)**
- Eliminated: Marcela Tauro **(43.21%)**
- Withdrew: Carlos "Negro" Álvarez

=== Week 5 ===
Ballet
Date	Celebrity	Song	Score					Total
Date	Celebrity	Song	ÁDB	NG	MC	SS	MP	Total
16 July	Ergün Demir	Luciano Pavarotti – "Nessun Dorma"	3	4	6	9	1	23
16 July	Martín Campilongo	Ángel Mahler – "Soñar hasta enloquecer"	4	5	5	6	1	**21**
16 July	Cinthia Fernandez	Georges Bizet – "Les Toréadors"	10	8	8	9	8	43
16 July	Ailén Bechara	Ludwig van Beethoven – "Sinfonía n.º 9"	1	4	5	7	4	**21**
17 July	Florencia De La V	Camille Saint-Saëns – "La muerte del cisne"	4	7	7	6	2	26
17 July	Candela Ruggeri	Piotr Ilich Chaikovski – "La bella durmiente"	5	7	5	6	7	30
17 July	Alberto Samid	Ludwig van Beethoven – "Sinfonía n.º 5"	0	10	10	4	5	29
20 July	Luciano "Tirri" Giugno & Noelia Marzol	Piotr Ilich Chaikovski – "El lago de los cisnes: Obertura"	4	5	6	6	5	26
20 July	Fernando Burlando & Bárbara Franco	Andrew Lloyd Webber – "El fantasma de la ópera"	6	7	8	7	5	33
21 July	Luciana Salazar	Ludwig Minkus – "Don Quijote: Quiteria"	9	8	8	7	7	39
21 July	Fernando Dente & Lourdes Sánchez	Ludwig Minkus – "Don Quijote: Primer Acto (Fragmentos)"	10	9	10	10	8	47
21 July	Freddy Villarreal	Piotr Ilich Chaikovski – "El lago de los cisnes: Vals"	9	9	9	10	7	44
23 July	Bárbara Vélez	Piotr Ilich Chaikovski – "El Lago de los cisnes: Mazurka"	3	5	5	6	2	**21**
23 July	Carmen Barbieri	Piotr Ilich Chaikovski – "El cisne negro"	8	7	10	9	7	41
23 July	Gisela Bernal	Piotr Ilich Chaikovski – "Pas De Deux"	10	10	10	10	9	**49**
24 July	Juana Viale	Piotr Ilich Chaikovski – "Vals de las flores"	4	7	8	6	8	33
24 July	Federico Bal & Laura Fernández	Piotr Ilich Chaikovski – "Primer concierto para piano"	4	5	5	5	4	23
24 July	Verónica Ojeda	Giuseppe Verdi – "El corsario"	5	4	5	8	4	26
24 July	Celeste Muriega	Piotr Ilich Chaikovski – "Danza española"	10	7	7	10	8	42
27 July	Lizy Tagliani	Georges Bizet – "Suite"	7	7	5	10	7	36
27 July	Nazarena Vélez	Piotr Ilich Chaikovski – "Pas de Quatre"	6	6	8	8	5	33
27 July	Nito Artaza & Silvina Scheffler	Wolfgang Amadeus Mozart – "Serenata n.º 13"	2	6	7	7	4	26

- Saved by the jury: Martín Campilongo, Nito Artaza, Federico Bal & Laura Fernández, Verónica Ojeda, Ailén Bechara, Florencia de la V, Bárbara Vélez
- Saved by the public: Ergün Demir **(75.03%)**
- Eliminated: Luciano "Tirri" Giugno & Noelia Marzol **(24.97%)**

=== Week 6 ===
Freestyle I
Date	Celebrity	Song	Score					Total
Date	Celebrity	Song	ÁDB	NG	MC	SS	MP	Total
30 July	Cinthia Fernandez	Gustavo Cerati – "En la ciudad de la furia" / "Corazón delator"	5	6	7	8	4	30
30 July	Candela Ruggeri	Abel Pintos – "No me olvides" / The White Stripes - "Seven Nation Army"	10	10	10	10	8	48
31 July	Juana Viale	DJ Dero – "Batucada"	9	9	8	9	8	43
31 July	Ergün Demir	Mix– "Turkish Zeybek" / "La cumparsita"	10	7	9	10	5	41
31 July	Celeste Muriega	River Ocean – "Love & Happiness" / Major Lazer & DJ Snake ft. MØ - "Lean On" / Beyoncé ft. Sean Paul - "Baby Boy"	8	8	9	10	9	44
31 July	Ailén Bechara	Calvin Harris ft. Ellie Goulding – "Outside" / Pink - "Blow Me"	5	5	7	7	6	30
3 August	Verónica Ojeda	Wisin ft. Jennifer Lopez & Ricky Martin – "Adrenalina"	6	7	5	9	6	33
3 August	Martín Campilongo	Charly García – "Good Show" / The Fevers - "Elas Por Elas"	9	10	10	10	9	48
3 August	Fernando Dente & Lourdes Sánchez	Roy Orbison – "Oh, Pretty Woman"	5	7	8	9	4	33
4 August	Florencia De La V	Michael Lucarelli – "Malagueña"	5	7	8	9	5	34
4 August	Bárbara Vélez	Moulin Rouge! – "Your Song" / "Elephant Love Medley"	7	8	6	7	8	36
4 August	Carmen Barbieri	Alfredo Casero - "Shimauta"	8	10	10	10	9	47
4 August	Nazarena Vélez	Christina Aguilera – "Enter The Circus" / Beyoncé – "Partition"	4	8	9	7	5	33
6 August	Lizy Tagliani	Pitbull ft. Osmani García – "El Taxi"/ Pitbull ft. John Ryan – "Fireball"	9	7	7	9	7	39
6 August	Alberto Samid	Sandro – "Yo te amo" / "Rosa Rosa" / "Dame fuego"	0	5	6	5	0	**16**
7 August	Luciana Salazar	Nathan Lanier – "Torn"	7	8	9	9	8	41
7 August	Gisela Bernal	Henry Mancini – "The Pink Panther"	6	8	8	9	7	38
7 August	Freddy Villarreal	The Nightmare Before Christmas – "Sally's Song"	10	10	10	10	10	**50**
7 August	Federico Bal & Laura Fernández	Todrick Hall – "Twerking In The Rain"	10	10	10	10	9	49
10 August	Fernando Burlando & Bárbara Franco	Wolfgang Amadeus Mozart – "Divertimento In D Major"	2	7	8	7	6	30
10 August	Nito Artaza & Silvina Scheffler	Antonio Tarragó Ros – "Don Gualberto"	8	9	9	8	8	42

- Saved by the jury: Fernando Dente & Lourdes Sánchez, Cinthia Fernandez, Ailén Bechara, Nazarena Vélez, Fernando Burlando & Bárbara Franco
- Saved by the public: Verónica Ojeda **(57.13%)**
- Eliminated: Alberto Samid **(42.87%)**

=== Week 7 ===
Folklore
Date	Celebrity	Song	Score					Total
Date	Celebrity	Song	ÁDB	NG	MC	SS	MP	Total
13 August	Juana Viale	Los Huayra – "Al jardín de la república"	7	7	7	7	8	36
13 August	Cinthia Fernandez	Los Nocheros – "La yapa"	9	8	9	9	7	42
13 August	Federico Bal & Laura Fernández	Soledad Pastorutti – "Chacarera de un triste"	6	9	10	9	5	39
14 August	Martín Campilongo	Los Tekis – "El Humahuaqueño"	10	8	7	10	6	41
14 August	Bárbara Vélez	Los Nocheros – "La Telesita"	3	6	6	6	3	**24**
17 August	Ergün Demir	Soledad Pastorutti & Natalia Pastorutti – "A Don Ata"	3	7	6	8	0	**24**
17 August	Luciana Salazar	Chaqueño Palavecino – "Chaco escondido"	8	8	7	10	6	39
17 August	Verónica Ojeda	Chaqueño Palavecino – "Envuelto en llamas"	5	7	8	9	6	35
18 August	Fernando Dente & Lourdes Sánchez	Los Chalchaleros – "Mi luna cautiva"	10	9	10	10	9	**48**
18 August	Carmen Barbieri	Mercedes Sosa – "La flor azul"	7	8	9	9	8	41
18 August	Gisela Bernal	Los Nocheros – "La López Pereyra"	10	9	10	10	9	**48**
20 August	Fernando Burlando & Bárbara Franco	Los Tekis & Los Huayra – "Viva Jujuy"	10	7	10	10	6	43
20 August	Lizy Tagliani	Los Nocheros – "Chacarera del Rancho"	10	8	8	9	7	42
21 August	Candela Ruggeri	Los Nocheros – "Cuando me dices que no"	7	8	6	7	3	31
21 August	Nazarena Vélez	Los Alonsitos – "Kilómetro 11"	7	6	7	7	4	31
21 August	Nito Artaza & Silvina Scheffler	Jorge Rojas – "Para cantar he nacido"	7	9	8	8	3	35
21 August	Ailén Bechara	Chaqueño Palavecino – "Dejame que me vaya"	8	8	9	9	8	42
24 August	Freddy Villarreal	Chaqueño Palavecino – "Troja de amor"	9	9	9	10	8	45
24 August	Florencia De La V	Soledad Pastorutti – "Entre a mi pago sin golpear"	8	9	10	10	8	45
24 August	Celeste Muriega	Mercedes Sosa – "Luna Tucumana"	6	7	7	8	7	31

- Saved by the jury: Nito Artaza & Silvina Scheffler, Candela Ruggeri, Ergün Demir, Celeste Muriega, Nazarena Vélez
- Saved by the public: Bárbara Vélez **(50.62%)**
- Eliminated: Verónica Ojeda **(49.38%)**

=== Week 8 ===
Bachata
Date	Celebrity	Song	Score					Total
Date	Celebrity	Song	ÁDB	NG	MC	SS	MP	Total
25 August	Cinthia Fernandez	Jesse & Joy ft. La Republika – "¡Corre!"	10	9	10	8	8	45
27 August	Federico Bal & Laura Fernández	Prince Royce – "Stand by Me"	10	10	7	10	6	43
27 August	Gisela Bernal	Romeo Santos – "Cancioncitas de Amor"	9	8	8	10	9	44
28 August	Martín Campilongo	Juan Luis Guerra – "Burbujas de Amor"	6	7	9	9	6	37
28 August	Fernando Dente & Lourdes Sánchez	Abel Pintos – "Aventuras"	7	7	10	8	5	37
28 August	Lizy Tagliani	Rebecca Kingsley ft. Wyclef Jean – "Killing Me Softly with His Song"	7	7	6	8	4	32
31 August	Ergün Demir	Juan Luis Guerra ft. Romeo Santos – "Frío, frío"	10	8	9	8	5	40
31 August	Candela Ruggeri	Dzerej ft. Bruno Mars – "When I Was Your Man"	3	6	8	7	8	32
31 August	Carmen Barbieri	Grupo Evidence ft. Juliana – "Colgando en tus manos"	5	7	7	9	6	34
1 September	Luciana Salazar	Romeo Santos – "Propuesta indecente"	9	6	7	10	9	41
1 September	Juana Viale	Prince Royce – "Darte un beso"	10	9	8	8	8	43
3 September	Fernando Burlando & Bárbara Franco	Xtreme – "Te extraño"	10	9	10	9	8	**46**
3 September	Freddy Villarreal	Romeo Santos – "Amigo"	7	9	9	9	8	42
4 September	Florencia De La V	Prince Royce – "Te robaré"	9	9	8	9	8	43
4 September	Bárbara Vélez	Thalia ft. Prince Royce – "Te perdiste mi amor"	4	7	7	8	4	**30**
4 September	Ailén Bechara	Prince Royce – "Incondicional"	9	6	6	9	4	31
4 September	Nazarena Vélez	Romeo Santos – "Llévame contigo"	2	8	8	8	8	34
7 September	Nito Artaza & Silvina Scheffler	Juan Luis Guerra – "Te regalo una rosa"	3	6	7	7	7	**30**
7 September	Celeste Muriega	LJ & Willy William – "Get Lucky"	7	8	9	8	4	36

- Saved by the jury: Candela Ruggeri, Bárbara Vélez, Ailén Bechara, Lizy Tagliani, Nazarena Vélez
- Saved by the public: Carmen Barbieri **(62.65%)**
- Eliminated: Nito Artaza & Silvina Scheffler **(37.35%)**

=== Week 9 ===
Salsa
Date	Celebrity / Invited	Song	Score					Total
Date	Celebrity / Invited	Song	ÁDB	NG	MC	SS	MP	Total
8 September	**Cinthia Fernandez** / Ángela Torres	Gilberto Santa Rosa – "Bemba Colorá"	10	10	10	10	8	48
8 September	**Martín Campilongo** / Beto Casella	Don Omar – "Danza Kuduro (versión salsa)"	3	6	8	9	3	29
10 September	**Ergün Demir** / Connie Ansaldi	Celia Cruz – "La Vida es un Carnaval"	4	5	4	8	0	**21**
10 September	**Federico Bal & Laura Fernández** / Melina Lezcano	Gente de Zona – "El Animal"	10	10	10	10	9	49
10 September	**Celeste Muriega** / Virginia Gallardo	Típica 73 – "Baila que baila"	7	9	10	10	8	44
11 September	**Candela Ruggeri** / Agustín Sierra	Albita Rodríguez – "Ta Bueno Ya"	10	9	8	9	8	44
11 September	**Bárbara Vélez** / José María Muscari	José Alberto "El Canario" – "Quiero Salsa"	7	8	8	9	7	39
11 September	**Nazarena Vélez** / Diego Pérez	Marc Anthony – "Vivir Mi Vida"	7	7	9	8	8	39
14 September	**Fernando Dente & Lourdes Sánchez** / Griselda Siciliani	Tito Puente – "Salsa y Sabor"	8	9	10	10	9	46
14 September	**Lizy Tagliani** / Paula Chaves	Celia Cruz – "Sobreviviré"	8	8	8	8	9	41
14 September	**Freddy Villarreal** / Anibal Pachano	Aymee Nuviola – "Salsa con Timba"	4	6	6	8	5	29
15 September	**Fernando Burlando & Bárbara Franco** / Magdalena Bravi	La 33 – "La rumba buena"	7	9	10	9	7	42
15 September	**Luciana Salazar** / Dady Brieva	DLG – "Magdalena, Mi amor (Quimbara)"	8	8	9	10	8	43
15 September	**Juana Viale** / Diego Ramos	N'Klabe – "I Love Salsa"	9	10	8	9	8	44
17 September	**Ailén Bechara** / Tito Speranza	Marc Anthony – "Valió la pena"	4	5	6	7	7	29
17 September	**Gisela Bernal** / Cecilia Figaredo	Sonora Carruseles – "La Salsa La Traigo Yo"	10	10	10	10	10	**50**
17 September	**Florencia De La V** / Facundo Mazzei	Sonora Carruseles – "Vengo Caliente"	10	9	9	9	9	46
18 September	**Carmen Barbieri** / Beto César	Tito Rodriguez – "Llévatela"	4	6	6	7	6	29

- Saved by the jury: Ergün Demir, Freddy Villarreal, Bárbara Vélez, Martín Campilongo, Ailén Bechara
- Saved by the public: Carmen Barbieri **(58.23%)**
- Eliminated: Nazarena Velez **(41.77%)**

=== Week 10 ===
Cuarteto
Date	Celebrity	Song	Score					Total
Date	Celebrity	Song	ÁDB	NG	MC	SS	MP	Total
21 September	Ergün Demir	La Mona Jiménez – "Beso a beso"	1	6	6	7	0	**20**
21 September	Federico Bal & Laura Fernández	Walter Olmos – "Amor fugitivo"	8	8	8	8	3	35
22 September	Candela Ruggeri	Rodrigo – "Fue lo mejor del amor"	8	9	9	9	5	40
22 September	Bárbara Vélez	Rodrigo – "Qué ironía"	7	7	6	8	3	31
22 September	Florencia De La V	Florencia de la V – "La Gata"	7	7	8	8	5	35
24 September	Fernando Dente & Lourdes Sánchez	Rodrigo – "Por lo que yo te Quiero"	9	8	8	9	5	39
24 September	Juana Viale	Rodrigo – "Cómo Olvidarla"	3	6	5	6	0	**20**
24 September	Ailén Bechara	Trulala – "Hay algo en ella"	10	9	9	10	7	45
24 September	Carmen Barbieri	Chispita – "La gorda Yesiré"	8	8	10	9	7	42
25 September	Luciana Salazar	Walter Olmos – "Soy un adicto a ti"	6	8	8	9	5	36
25 September	Freddy Villarreal	La Mona Jiménez – "El Agite" / "El Tatuaje" / Walter Olmos – "No me mientas"	10	9	10	10	6	45
25 September	Lizy Tagliani	La Mona Jiménez – "El Bum Bum"	10	8	8	7	8	41
25 September	Celeste Muriega	Banda XXI – "Déjame Llorar"	6	7	10	10	4	37
28 September	Cinthia Fernandez	Rodrigo – "Amor clasificado"	10	9	9	9	9	**46**
28 September	Gisela Bernal	Rodrigo – "Fuego y pasión"	9	8	8	8	7	40
28 September	Martín Campilongo	La Konga – "Quieren matar al ladrón"	6	8	8	8	7	35
29 September	Fernando Burlando & Bárbara Franco	Rodrigo – "Soy cordobés"	5	9	10	9	7	40

- Saved by the jury: Bárbara Vélez, Federico Bal & Laura Fernández, Juana Viale, Ergün Demir
- Saved by the public: Martín Campilongo **(54.72%)**
- Eliminated: Florencia de la V **(45.28%)**
- Withdrew: Carmen Barbieri

=== Week 11 ===
Adagio
Date	Celebrity	Song	Score					Total
Date	Celebrity	Song	ÁDB	NG	MC	SS	MP	Total
1 October	Fernando Dente & Lourdes Sánchez	Ed Sheeran – "Thinking Out Loud"	6	10	8	10	7	41
1 October	Candela Ruggeri	Demi Lovato – "Skyscraper"	7	8	7	9	7	38
1 October	Cinthia Fernandez	Ellie Goulding – "Love Me Like You Do"	10	10	10	10	9	49
2 October	Luciana Salazar	Pink – "Just Give Me a Reason"	8	8	7	7	6	36
2 October	Ailén Bechara	Céline Dion – "I am your lady"	1	6	5	6	0	**18**
2 October	Lizy Tagliani	Adele – "Someone like you"	5	6	9	9	10	39
2 October	Gisela Bernal	Sam Smith – "Stay with me"	10	10	10	10	10	**50**
5 October	Federico Bal & Laura Fernández	Eminem ft. Rihanna – "Love the Way you Lie"	10	9	7	9	4	39
5 October	Bárbara Vélez	Glee – "Total Eclipse of the Heart"	5	8	8	7	7	35
5 October	Celeste Muriega	Christina Aguilera ft. Blake Shelton – "Just a Fool"	7	9	7	7	5	35
5 October	Freddy Villarreal	Bruno Mars – "When I Was Your Man"	4	8	9	9	5	35
6 October	Ergün Demir	Robbie Williams – "Angels"	4	6	5	7	5	27
6 October	Juana Viale	Queen – "Love of My Life"	10	9	10	10	10	49
6 October	Fernando Burlando & Bárbara Franco	Debbie Gibson – "Lost in Your Eyes"	0	6	8	7	6	27
8 October	Martín Campilongo	Sergio Denis – "Nada Cambiará mi Amor por Ti"	6	7	7	9	6	35

- Saved by the jury: Celeste Muriega, Freddy Villarreal, Bárbara Vélez, Martín Campilongo, Ergün Demir
- Saved by the public: Ailén Bechara **(67.42%)**
- Eliminated: Fernando Burlando & Bárbara Franco **(32.58%)**

=== Week 12 ===
VideoClip
Date	Celebrity	Song	Score					Total
Date	Celebrity	Song	ÁDB	NG	MC	SS	MP	Total
9 October	Candela Ruggeri	Taylor Swift – "Shake It Off"	4	7	7	7	4	29
9 October	Cinthia Fernandez	Taylor Swift ft. Kendrick Lamar – "Bad Blood"	9	8	9	10	8	44
9 October	Gisela Bernal	Katy Perry ft. Juicy J – "Dark Horse"	8	9	9	10	10	46
12 October	Ergün Demir	Mark Ronson ft. Bruno Mars – "Uptown Funk"	2	7	7	10	10	36
12 October	Celeste Muriega	Selena Gomez – "Slow Down"	4	7	7	7	4	29
13 October	Fernando Dente & Lourdes Sánchez	Maroon 5 ft. Christina Aguilera – "Moves Like Jagger"	4	7	7	7	4	29
13 October	Federico Bal & Laura Fernández	Maroon 5 – "Animals"	8	8	7	7	5	35
13 October	Ailén Bechara	Nicki Minaj – "Starships"	8	7	5	8	7	35
13 October	Martín Campilongo	Elvis Presley – "Jailhouse Rock"	6	9	9	9	6	39
15 October	Luciana Salazar	Iggy Azalea ft. Rita Ora – "Black widow"	7	8	9	8	8	40
15 October	Bárbara Vélez	Katy Perry – "This Is How We Do"	6	8	8	8	7	37
15 October	Freddy Villarreal	Bee Gees – "You Should Be Dancing"	10	10	9	10	10	**49**
15 October	Lizy Tagliani	Rihanna – "Only Girl (In the World)"	3	7	8	8	3	29
16 October	Juana Viale	Ariana Grande ft. Iggy Azalea – "Problem"	2	6	5	6	3	**22**

- Saved by the jury: Fernando Dente & Lourdes Sánchez, Federico Bal & Laura Fernandez, Candela Ruggeri, Ailen Bechara, Lizy Tigliani
- Saved by the public: Celeste Muriega **(52.05%)**
- Eliminated: Juana Viale **(47.95%)**

=== Week 13 ===
Aqua Dance
Date	Celebrity	Song	Score					Total
Date	Celebrity	Song	ÁDB	NG	MC	SS	MP	Total
19 October	Cinthia Fernandez	Alanis Morissette – "Uninvited"	10	10	10	10	10	**50**
19 October	Ergün Demir	Christina Aguilera – "Beautiful"	6	7	8	9	6	36
20 October	Federico Bal & Laura Fernández	Miley Cyrus – "Wrecking Ball"	8	8	7	8	5	36
20 October	Candela Ruggeri	Adele – "Set Fire to the Rain"	7	7	9	8	8	39
22 October	Fernando Dente & Lourdes Sánchez	Carmen Twillie – "Circle of Life"	9	8	8	8	3	36
22 October	Bárbara Vélez	Keane – "Somewhere Only We Know"	6	8	9	9	8	40
22 October	Celeste Muriega	Céline Dion – "Alone"	9	8	8	9	9	43
23 October	Gisela Bernal	Gustavo Cerati ft. Mercedes Sosa – "Zona de promesas"	7	8	7	9	7	38
23 October	Freddy Villarreal	Evanescence - "My Immortal"	10	10	10	10	10	**50**
23 October	Ailén Bechara	Susan Boyle – "You ´ll See"	6	8	6	8	8	36
26 October	Martín Campilongo	Almendra – "Muchacha ojos de Papel"	7	8	9	8	6	38
26 October	Luciana Salazar	Sia – "Chandelier"	9	9	10	9	9	46
26 October	Lizy Tagliani	Chelsea Redfern – "Purple Rain"	5	7	7	7	6	**33**

- Saved by the jury: Gisela Bernal, Fernando Dente & Lourdes Sánchez, Ailén Bechara, Federico Bal & Laura Fernandez, Martín Campilongo
- Saved by the public: Ergün Demir **(56.09%)**
- Eliminated: Lizy Tagliani **(43.91%)**

=== Week 14 ===
Latin pop
Date	Celebrity	Song	Score					Total
Date	Celebrity	Song	ÁDB	NG	MC	SS	MP	Total
29 October	Cinthia Fernandez	Chayanne – "La Madre Tierra"	**7**	9	8	10	8	42
29 October	Fernando Dente & Lourdes Sánchez	Ricky Martin – "La Mordidita"	**7**	7	10	10	8	42
29 October	Bárbara Vélez	Wisin ft. Ricky Martin & Jennifer López – "Adrenalina"	**7**	7	6	7	6	33
29 October	Ailén Bechara	Jennifer López – "Bailar Nada Más"	**7**	6	8	8	4	33
30 October	Ergün Demir	Nicky Jam – "El perdón"	**5**	5	6	7	2	**25**
30 October	Federico Bal & Laura Fernández	Lali Espósito – "Mil años luz"	**9**	9	8	10	8	**44**
30 October	Gisela Bernal	Ricky Martin – "Pégate"	**8**	8	8	10	8	42
30 October	Celeste Muriega	Enrique Iglesias – "Bailando"	**9**	8	8	10	9	**44**
2 November	Freddy Villarreal	Ricky Martin – "Adiós"	**9**	8	7	8	5	37
2 November	Candela Ruggeri	Jennifer López ft. Pitbull – "Ven a bailar"	**5**	8	9	9	6	37
2 November	Luciana Salazar	David Bisbal – "Oye el boom"	—	—	—	—	—	—
2 November	Martín Campilongo	Chayanne – "Torero"	**5**	8	9	7	5	33

- Saved by the jury: Candela Ruggeri, Martín Campilongo, Ailén Bechara, Freddy Villarreal, Ergün Demir
- Saved by the public: Bárbara Vélez **(55.02%)**
- Eliminated: Luciana Salazar **(44.98%)**

=== Week 15 ===
Tango or Milonga
Date	Celebrity	Song	Score					Total
Date	Celebrity	Song	ÁDB	NG	MC	SS	MP	Total
5 November	Gisela Bernal	Gerardo Matos Rodríguez – "La Cumparsita"	10	10	10	10	10	**50**
5 November	Cinthia Fernandez	Astor Piazolla – "Libertango"	10	9	10	10	9	48
6 November	Federico Bal & Laura Fernández	Juan de Dios Filiberto – "Quejas de Bandoneón"	8	8	8	8	6	38
6 November	Candela Ruggeri	Cátulo Castillo – "Tinta roja"	5	7	7	9	7	35
6 November	Ailén Bechara	Héctor Varela & Ernesto Rossi – "Azúcar, pimienta y sal"	0	5	6	5	0	**18**
9 November	Ergün Demir	Mariano Mores – "El firulete"	8	8	8	8	3	35
9 November	Bárbara Vélez	Julián Plaza – "Nocturna"	7	8	9	9	8	41
9 November	Freddy Villarreal	Mariano Mores – "Taquito Militar"	8	8	10	9	7	42
10 November	Fernando Dente & Lourdes Sánchez	Sexteto Mayor – "Tanguera"	10	10	10	10	10	**50**
10 November	Martín Campilongo	Cacho Castaña – "Garganta con arena"	8	9	10	9	7	42
10 November	Celeste Muriega	Carlos Lazzari – "La Puñalada"	10	10	10	10	9	49

- Saved by the jury: Federico Bal & Laura Fernandez, Ergün Demir
- Saved by the public: Ailén Bechara **(56.53%)**
- Eliminated: Candela Ruggeri **(43.47%)**

=== Week 16 ===
Improvised dance
Date	Celebrity	Style (in duel)	Song (in duel)	Score					Total
Date	Celebrity	Style (in duel)	Song (in duel)	ÁDB	NG	MC	SS	MP	Total
12 November	Gisela Bernal	**Folklore**	Chaqueño Palavecino – "Troja de Amor"	10	8	8	9	8	43
12 November	Federico Bal & Laura Fernández	**Reggaeton**	Daddy Yankee ft. Major Lazer – "Watch Out for This"	6	7	8	10	9	40
12 November	Celeste Muriega	**Folklore** / (**Disco**)	Los Nocheros – "Chacarera del Rancho" / (Jamiroquai – "Canned Heat")	7	8	6	9	5	35
12 November	Freddy Villarreal	**Cumbia** / (**Bachata**)	Gilda – "Paisaje" / (Prince Royce – "Darte un beso")	0	5	8	8	4	**25**
13 November	Cinthia Fernandez	**Disco** / (**Reggaeton**)	Bruno Mars – "Treasure" / (Ricky Martin ft. Daddy Yankee – "Drop It On Me")	5	8	9	9	7	38
13 November	Bárbara Vélez	**Disco** / (**Cuarteto**)	Earth, Wind & Fire – "Boogie Wonderland" / (Rodrigo – "Fue lo mejor del amor")	8	8	8	7	7	38
13 November	Ailén Bechara	**Cuarteto**	Rodrigo – "Soy cordobés"	10	9	8	9	8	44
16 November	Ergün Demir	**Disco** / (**Street Pop**)	Kylie Minogue – "Celebration" / (Nicki Minaj – "Starships")	3	5	8	7	2	**25**
16 November	Fernando Dente & Lourdes Sánchez	**Disco**	Donna Summer – "Hot Stuff"	8	9	10	10	8	**45**
17 November	Martín Campilongo	**Reggaeton** / (**Disco**)	Nicky Jam – "El Perdón" / (Donna Summer – "Last Dance")	4	7	8	8	8	35

- Saved by the jury: Cinthia Fernandez, Celeste Muriega, Freddy Villarreal, Ergün Demir
- Saved by the public: Martín Campilongo **(58.40%)**
- Eliminated: Bárbara Vélez **(41.60%)**

=== Week 17 ===
Freestyle II
Date	Celebrity	Song	Score					Total
Date	Celebrity	Song	ÁDB	NG	MC	SS	MP	Total
19 November	Cinthia Fernandez	Nathan Lanier – "Torn" / Hans Zimmer – "To Die For" / Beyoncé – "Ave Maria"	8	10	10	10	10	48
20 November	Federico Bal & Laura Fernández	Elvis Presley – "Blue Suede Shoes" / Queen – "Another One Bites the Dust" / The Rolling Stones – "Start Me Up" / Michael Jackson – "Black or White" / Flo Rida – "GDFR"	6	8	7	10	5	35
20 November	Gisela Bernal	A.R. Rahman – "Jai Ho" / Michael Jackson – "Wanna Be Startin' Somethin'"	10	10	10	10	10	**50**
20 November	Ailén Bechara	Chris Brown – "Fine China" / Christina Aguilera – "Fighter" / Queen – "Love of My Life"	4	6	6	6	6	28
20 November	Celeste Muriega	Osvaldo Farrés – "Quizás, quizás, quizás" / DLG – "Kimbara" / Gibson Brothers - "Cuba"	6	6	7	8	6	33
23 November	Ergün Demir	Charles Gerhardt – "La Bohème" / "Orpheus In The Underworld: Can Can"	3	3	2	9	0	**17**
23 November	Freddy Villarreal	Big Bad Voodoo Daddy – "The Call of the Jitterbug" / Harry Chestwick – "Komm, Sei So Lieb"	9	8	9	10	9	46
24 November	Fernando Dente & Lourdes Sánchez	Frank Sinatra – "Strangers in the Night" / "Fly Me to the Moon"	10	9	10	10	9	48
24 November	Martín Campilongo	Mercedes Sosa – "Gracias a la vida" / "Y dale alegría a mi corazón"	7	8	9	10	9	43

- Saved by the jury: Celeste Muriega
- Saved by the public: Ailén Bechara **(52.28%)**
- Eliminated: Ergün Demir **(47.72%)**

=== Week 18 ===
K-pop
Date	Celebrity	Song	Score					Total
Date	Celebrity	Song	ÁDB	NG	MC	SS	MP	Total
26 November	Martín Campilongo	Shinee – "Married to the music"	8	9	9	9	8	43
26 November	Federico Bal & Laura Fernández	Big Bang – "Bang, Bang, Bang"	8	10	10	10	9	**48**
27 November	Cinthia Fernandez	Girls’ Generation – "I Got A Boy"	6	8	8	9	9	40
27 November	Freddy Villarreal	Super Junior – "Mamacita"	4	7	6	7	5	**29**
27 November	Gisela Bernal	9MUSES – "Hurt Locker"	8	8	7	8	7	38
30 November	Ailén Bechara	4MINUTE – "Crazy"	8	8	9	8	7	40
30 November	Fernando Dente & Lourdes Sánchez	Shinee – "Sherlock (Clue & Note)"	8	8	10	9	5	40
30 November	Celeste Muriega	SISTAR – "Shake It"	7	7	9	9	6	38

- Saved by the jury: Cinthia Fernandez, Fernando Dente & Lourdes Sánchez, Gisela Bernal, Ailén Bechara
- Saved by the public: Freddy Villarreal **(59.47%)**
- Eliminated: Celeste Muriega **(40.43%)**

=== Week 19 ===
Rock Acrobatic
Date	Celebrity	Song	Score					Total
Date	Celebrity	Song	ÁDB	NG	MC	SS	MP	Total
3 December	Martín Campilongo	Elvis Presley – "Blue Suede Shoes"	4	6	6	7	4	**27**
3 December	Federico Bal & Laura Fernández	Miranda Lambert – "Jailhouse Rock"	10	9	9	9	8	45
3 December	Ailén Bechara	Queen – "Crazy Little Thing Called Love"	6	7	7	6	8	34
4 December	Cinthia Fernandez	Glee Cast – "Proud Mary"	9	10	9	9	9	46
4 December	Gisela Bernal	Tom Jones – "Hound Dog"	10	10	10	10	10	**50**
7 December	Fernando Dente & Lourdes Sánchez	Blake Shelton – "Footloose"	9	8	8	9	7	41
7 December	Freddy Villarreal	Elvis Presley – "All Shook Up"	7	7	9	8	8	39

- Saved by the jury: Freddy Villareal
- Saved by the public: Ailén Bechara **(56.45%)**
- Eliminated: Martín Campilongo **(43.55%)**

=== Week 20 ===
==== Merengue ====
Merengue
Date	Celebrity	Song	Score					Total
Date	Celebrity	Song	ÁDB	NG	MC	SS	MP	Total
8 December	Federico Bal & Laura Fernández	Oro Solido – "Moviendo las Caderas"	10	9	7	10	7	43
8 December	Cinthia Fernandez	Jandy Ventura y Los Potros – "Muévelo"	7	9	9	9	10	44
8 December	Ailén Bechara	Jean Carlos – "Quiéreme"	6	8	8	10	9	41
8 December	Gisela Bernal	Juan Luis Guerra – "La Gallera"	10	9	9	10	10	48
10 December	Fernando Dente & Lourdes Sánchez	Wilfrido Vargas – "Abusadora"	10	10	10	10	9	**49**
10 December	Freddy Villarreal	Olga Tañón – "Es Mentiroso"	7	7	6	8	8	**36**

==== Street Pop ====
Street Pop
Date	Celebrity	Song	Score					Total
Date	Celebrity	Song	ÁDB	NG	MC	SS	MP	Total
10 December	Federico Bal & Laura Fernández	Taylor Swift ft. Kendrick Lamar – "Bad Blood"	8	9	8	9	6	**40**
10 December	Cinthia Fernandez	Chris Brown – "Don't Wake Me Up"	9	9	10	10	8	46
11 December	Ailén Bechara	Justin Bieber & Nicki Minaj – "Beauty and a Beat"	10	8	8	8	8	42
11 December	Gisela Bernal	Jessie J ft. 2 Chainz – "Burnin' up"	8	10	10	10	7	46
11 December	Fernando Dente & Lourdes Sánchez	Ariana Grande ft. Zedd – "Break Free"	10	10	10	10	10	**50**
11 December	Freddy Villarreal	Avicii – "Wake Me Up"	8	10	9	10	10	47

- Saved by the jury: Gisela Bernal, Cinthia Fernández, Federico Bal & Laura Fernández
- Saved by the public: Ailén Bechara **(54.21%)**
- Eliminated: Freddy Villareal **(45.79%)**

=== Week 21 ===
Country
Date	Celebrity	Song	Result
15 December	**Gisela Bernal**	Alan Jackson – "Chattahoochee"	**Advanced to the Semifinals**
15 December	**Federico Bal & Laura Fernández**	Andy Grammer – "Honey, I'm Good."	**Advanced to the Semifinals**
15 December	**Fernando Dente & Lourdes Sánchez**	Alabama – "If You Gonna Play in Texas"	**Eliminated**
15 December	**Ailén Bechara**	Pitbull ft. Kesha – "Timber"	**Advanced to the Semifinals**
15 December	**Cinthia Fernandez**	Robin Thicke ft. T.I. and Pharrell – "Blurred Lines"	**Advanced to the Semifinals**

- Saved by the jury: Gisela Bernal, Cinthia Fernández, Ailén Bechara
- Saved by the public: Federico Bal **(56.95%)**
- Eliminated: Fernando Dente **(43.05%)**

=== Semifinal 1 - Reggaeton / Tango or Milonga / Cuarteto / Adagio ===
Semifinal 1
Date	Celebrity	Style	Song	Score					Total
Date	Celebrity	Style	Song	ÁDB	NG	MC	SS	MP	Total
1st Semifinal (17 December)	Gisela Bernal	**Reggaeton**	Daddy Yankee ft. Fergie – "Impacto"						0
1st Semifinal (17 December)	Federico Bal & Laura Fernández	**Reggaeton**	Yandel ft. El General Gadiel – "Plakito"						1
1st Semifinal (17 December)	Gisela Bernal	**Tango or** **Milonga**	Gerardo Matos Rodríguez – "La Cumparsita"						1
1st Semifinal (17 December)	Federico Bal & Laura Fernández	**Tango or** **Milonga**	Juan de Dios Filiberto – "Quejas de Bandoneón"						0
1st Semifinal (17 December)	Gisela Bernal	**Cuarteto**	Rodrigo – "Fuego y pasión"						0
1st Semifinal (17 December)	Federico Bal & Laura Fernández	**Cuarteto**	Walter Olmos – "Amor fugitivo"						1
1st Semifinal (17 December)	Gisela Bernal	**Adagio**	Sam Smith – "Stay with me"						0
1st Semifinal (17 December)	Federico Bal & Laura Fernández	**Adagio**	Eminem ft. Rihanna – "Love the Way you Lie"						1

Totales
Couple	Subtotal	Telephone vote	Total
**Federico Bal & Laura Fernández**	3	**59.55%** (4)	**7**
**Gisela Bernal**	1	**40.45%** (0)	**1**

Notes:

- :The point is for the couple.
- :The point is not for the couple.

Result:

- Finalist: Federico Bal & Laura Fernández
- Semifinalist: Gisela Bernal

=== Semifinal 2 - Cumbia / Disco / Latin pop / VideoClip ===
Semifinal 2
Date	Celebrity	Style	Song	Score					Total
Date	Celebrity	Style	Song	ÁDB	NG	MC	SS	MP	Total
2nd Semifinal (18 December)	Ailén Bechara	Cumbia	Gilda – "Corazón valiente"						0
2nd Semifinal (18 December)	Cinthia Fernandez	Cumbia	Américo – "Te vas"						1
2nd Semifinal (18 December)	Ailén Bechara	Disco	Gloria Gaynor – "Can't Take My Eyes Off You"						1
2nd Semifinal (18 December)	Cinthia Fernandez	Disco	Earth, Wind & Fire – "Boogie Wonderland"						0
2nd Semifinal (18 December)	Ailén Bechara	Latin pop	Jennifer López – "Bailar Nada Más"						0
2nd Semifinal (18 December)	Cinthia Fernandez	Latin pop	Chayanne – "La Madre Tierra"						1
2nd Semifinal (18 December)	Ailén Bechara	VideoClip	Nicki Minaj – "Starships"						1
2nd Semifinal (18 December)	Cinthia Fernandez	VideoClip	Taylor Swift ft. Kendrick Lamar – "Bad Blood"						0

Totales
Couple	Subtotal	Telephone vote	Total
**Ailén Bechara**	2	**53.74%** (4)	**6**
**Cinthia Fernandez**	2	**46.26%** (0)	**2**

Notes:

- :The point is for the couple.
- :The point is not for the couple.

Result:

- Finalist: Ailén Bechara
- Semifinalist: Cinthia Fernández

=== Final - Ballet / Bachata / Merengue / Freestyle II ===
Final
Date	Celebrity	Style	Song	Score					Total
Date	Celebrity	Style	Song	ÁDB	NG	MC	SS	MP	Total
Final (21 December)	Ailén Bechara	Ballet	Ludwig van Beethoven – "Sinfonía n.º 9"						1
Final (21 December)	Federico Bal & Laura Fernández	Ballet	Piotr Ilich Chaikovski – "Primer concierto para piano"						0
Final (21 December)	Ailén Bechara	Bachata	Prince Royce – "Incondicional"						0
Final (21 December)	Federico Bal & Laura Fernández	Bachata	Prince Royce – "Stand by Me"						1
Final (21 December)	Ailén Bechara	Merengue	Jean Carlos – "Quiéreme"						0
Final (21 December)	Federico Bal & Laura Fernández	Merengue	Oro Solido – "Moviendo las Caderas"						1
Final (21 December)	Ailén Bechara	Freestyle II	Chris Brown – "Fine China" / Christina Aguilera – "Fighter" / Queen – "Love of My Life"						0
Final (21 December)	Federico Bal & Laura Fernández	Freestyle II	Elvis Presley – "Blue Suede Shoes" / Queen – "Another One Bites the Dust" / The Rolling Stones – "Start Me Up" / Michael Jackson – "Black or White" / Flo Rida – "GDFR"						1

Totales
Couple	Subtotal	Telephone vote	Total
**Federico Bal & Laura Fernández**	3	**51.82%** (4)	**7**
**Ailén Bechara**	1	**48.18%** (0)	**1**

Notes:

- :The point is for the couple.
- :The point is not for the couple.

Result:

- Winners: Federico Bal & Laura Fernández
- Runners-up: Ailén Bechara
