= Sztajnszrajber =

Sztajnszrajber is a surname. Notable people with the surname include:

- Darío Sztajnszrajber (born 1968), Argentine philosopher
- Mauro Sztajnszrajber (born 1973), Argentine journalist
