= ¿Quién es la máscara? (Argentine TV series) =

Argentine television program

- Genre: Reality
- Created by: Seo Chang-man
- Based on: King of Mask Singer by Munhwa Broadcasting Corporation
- Presented by: Natalia Oreiro
- Judges: Wanda Nara; Roberto Moldavsky; Lizy Tagliani; Karina
- Country of origin: Argentina
- Original language: Spanish
- No. of seasons: 1
- No. of episodes: 24

Production
- Production location: Buenos Aires
- Production companies: Telefe; Paramount Networks Americas

Original release
- Network: Telefe
- Release: September 12 – October 13, 2022

Related
- King of Mask Singer

¿Quién es la máscara? (Spanish: Who Is the Mask?) is an Argentine talent reality television series produced by Telefe and Paramount Networks Americas. It is based on the South Korean television show King of Mask Singer created by Seo Chang-man. The series is hosted by Natalia Oreiro and premiered on September 12, 2022, with the series finale airing on October 13.

== Format ==
A group of celebrities hide behind a character and, episode after episode, a panel of researchers will try to discover who is behind the mask. Competitors are matched in face-off competitions and perform a song. The studio audience votes for their favorite performance and the masked singer with the most votes is safe for the week, while the celebrity with the fewest votes is nominated for elimination. The panelists decide which of the nominated celebrities will continue in the competition and the public saves another. The eliminated celebrity removes their mask to reveal their identity.

== Panelists and host ==
Panelists and host of ¿Quién es la máscara?

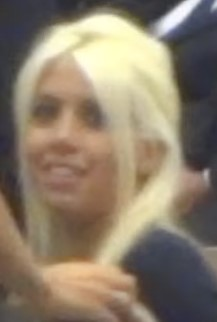
Wanda Nara

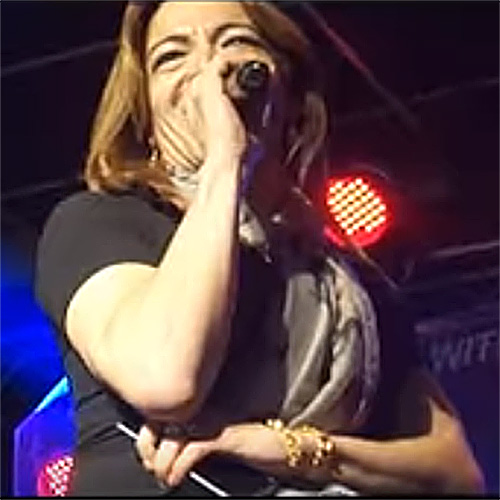
Lizy Tagliani

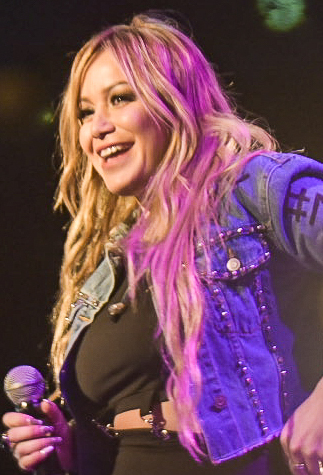
Karina

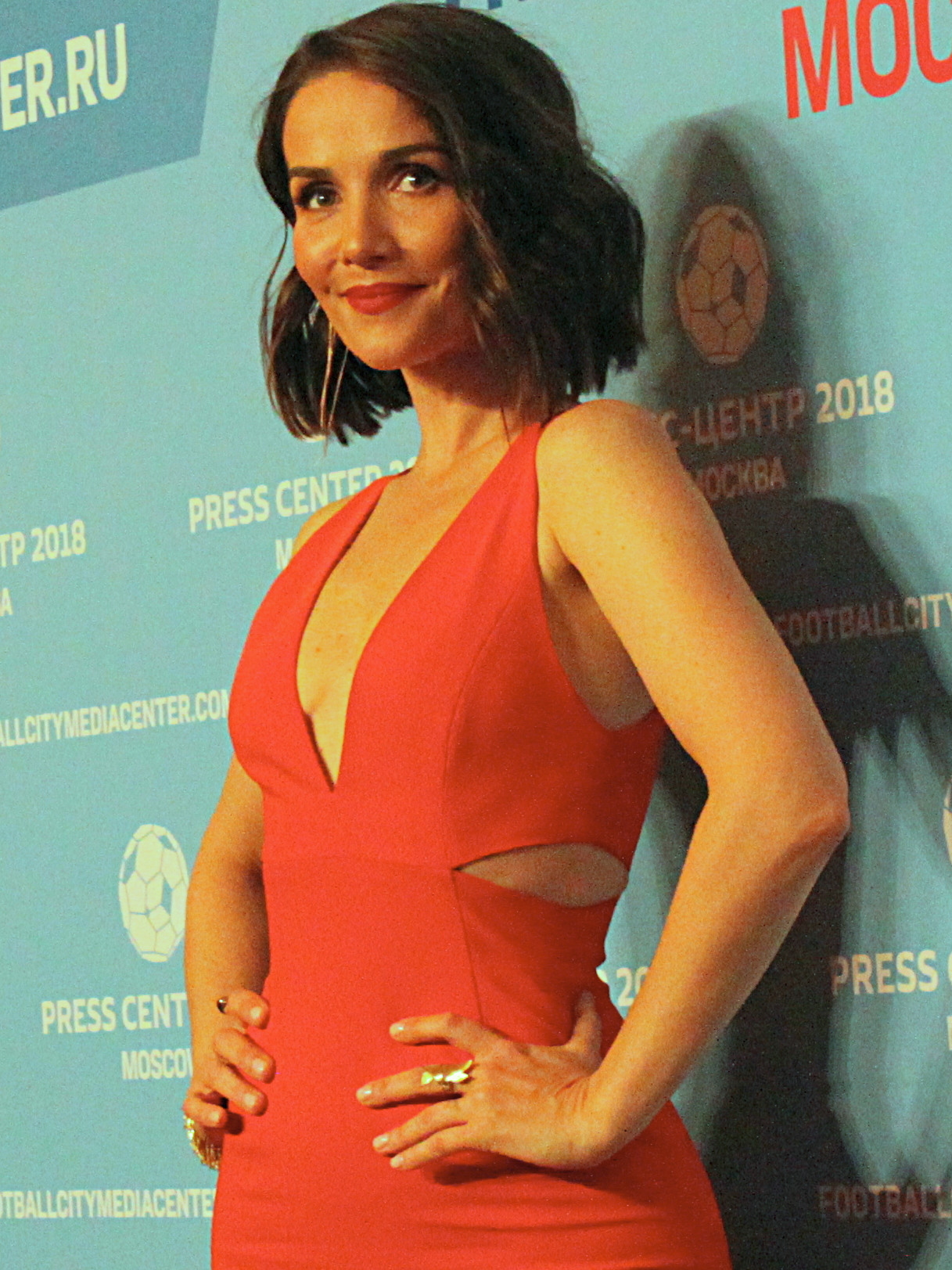
Natalia Oreiro

The panel consists of businesswoman Wanda Nara, comedian and actor Roberto Moldavsky, comedian and television host Lizy Tagliani and singer Karina.

== Season 1 ==
Contestants

Results
Stage name	Celebrity	Occupation	Episodes																							
Stage name	Celebrity	Occupation	Week 1					Week 2					Week 3					Week 4					Week 5			
Stage name	Celebrity	Occupation	1	2	3	4	5	6	7	8	9	10	11	12	13	14	15	16	17	18	19	20	21	22	23	24
Brillo ("Unicorn")	Fernando Dente	Actor	WIN						RISK			WIN			SAFE		SAFE		SAFE		WIN	WIN	SAFE	WIN	RISK	WINNER
Nieves ("Leopard")	Mercedes Funes	Actress		WIN						RISK		RISK				RISK	SAFE			RISK		WIN	SAFE	RISK	SAFE	RUNNER-UP
Therry ("Dog")	Damián de Santo	Actor			WIN			WIN							SAFE			RISK				RISK	SAFE	RISK	SAFE	THIRD
Olaf ("Viking")	Agustín Sierra	Actor	RISK				WIN		WIN				RISK				RISK		RISK			WIN	SAFE	WIN	OUT	
Luz ("Firefly")	Brenda Asnicar	Actress				WIN					RISK	WIN		SAFE			SAFE		SAFE		WIN	RISK	SAFE	WIN	OUT	
Pecas ("Burger")	Mauro Szeta	Journalist			WIN			RISK				RISK	SAFE				RISK			SAFE	RISK	RISK	RISK	OUT		
Pampa ("Armadillo")	Martín Campilongo	Comedian		RISK			WIN		WIN						RISK		SAFE			SAFE	WIN	WIN	OUT			
Oli ("Pufferfish")	Guillermina Valdés	Model	RISK				WIN			RISK		RISK		RISK			RISK	SAFE			RISK	OUT				
Pico ("Toucan")	Damián Betular	Chef				WIN					WIN			SAFE				SAFE			OUT					
Bot ("Robot")	Alejandro Lerner	Singer		WIN							WIN					SAFE				OUT						
Mansa ("Frog") (WC)	Dalma Maradona	Actress											SAFE						OUT							
Dragona ("Dragon") (WC)	Oriana Sabatini	Model																OUT								
Urta ("Cyclops")	Yayo Guridi	Comedian				RISK	WIN	WIN								SAFE	OUT									
Cambiazo ("Chameleon")	Fabián Cubero	Former football player		RISK			RISK				RISK	WIN				OUT										
Mamba ("Fish")	Fátima Flórez	Impersonator	WIN					RISK				WIN			OUT											
Salvador ("Peacock")	Pedro Alfonso	Actor			RISK		RISK			WIN				OUT												
Chincha ("Pig")	Marcela Tinayre	Television host			WIN					WIN			OUT													
Luna ("Alien Woman")	Charlotte Caniggia	Television personality		WIN					RISK			OUT														
Orquídea ("Flower") (WC)	Cristina Pérez	Journalist									OUT															
Sombra ("Black Swan")	Marcela Morelo	Singer				RISK	RISK			OUT																
Pixel ("Minecraft")	Santiago Maratea	Social media personality				WIN			OUT																	
Altavista ("Monster")	Raúl Lavié	Singer	WIN					OUT																		
Alexia ("Sun and Moon")	Magdalena Aicega	Former field hockey player			RISK		OUT																			
Saurio ("Dinosaur")	Ricardo Mollo	Musician				OUT																				
Lala ("Elephant")	Ángela Leiva	Singer			OUT																					
Hipo ("Seahorse")	Marta Minujín	Conceptual artist		OUT																						
Willy ("Pirate Turtle")	Guillermo Coria	Former tennis player	OUT																							

The masked singer won its face-off and remained in the competition.
The masked singer lost its face-off, but was not eliminated.
The masked singer was safe from elimination.
The masked singer was eliminated from the competition and unmasked upon elimination.
The masked singer did not perform in this episode.
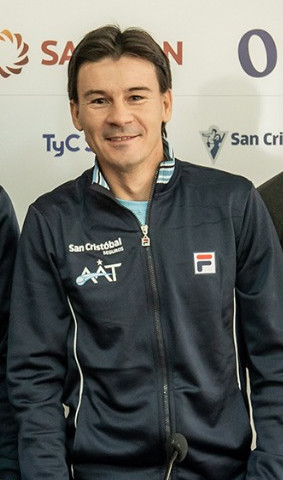
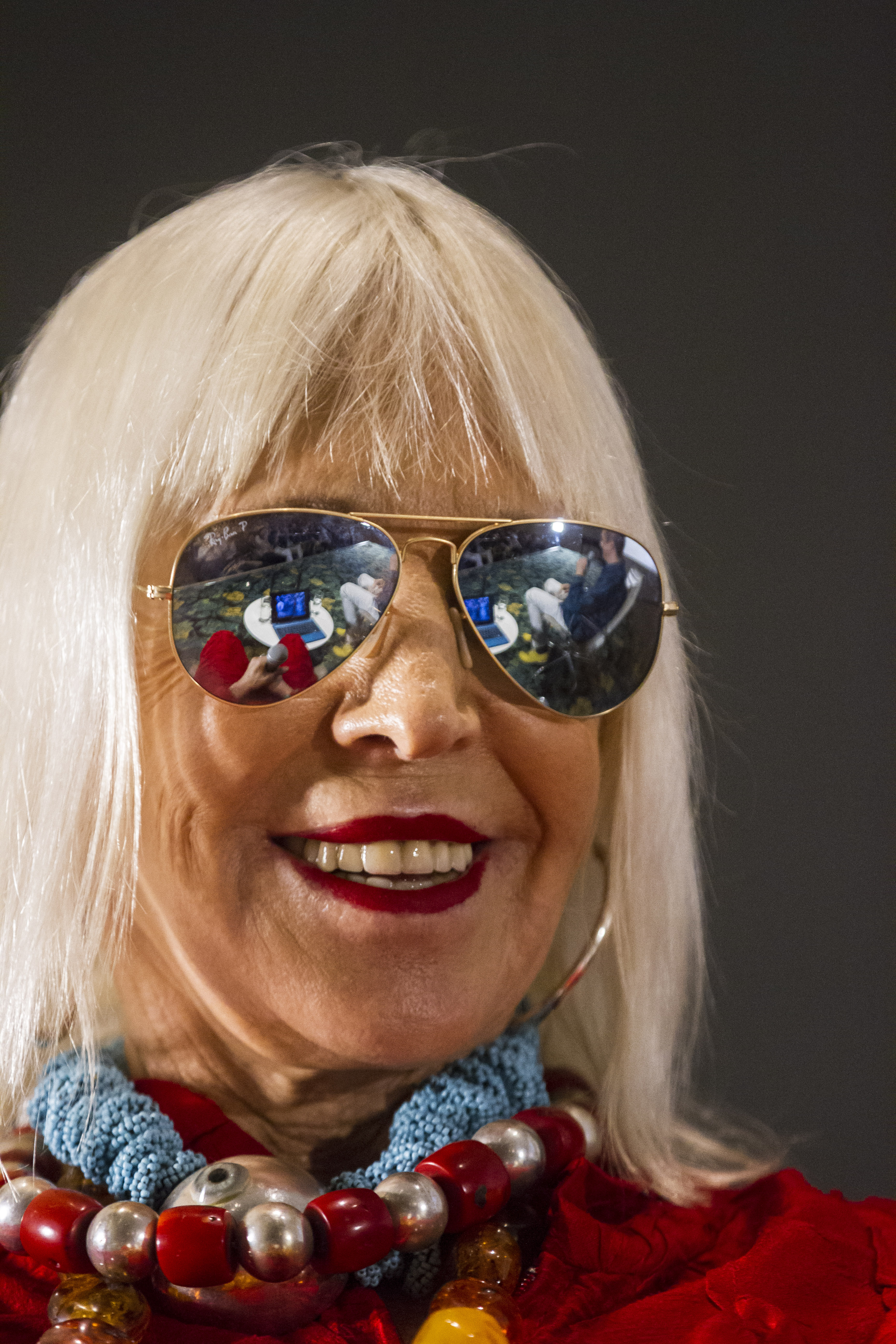
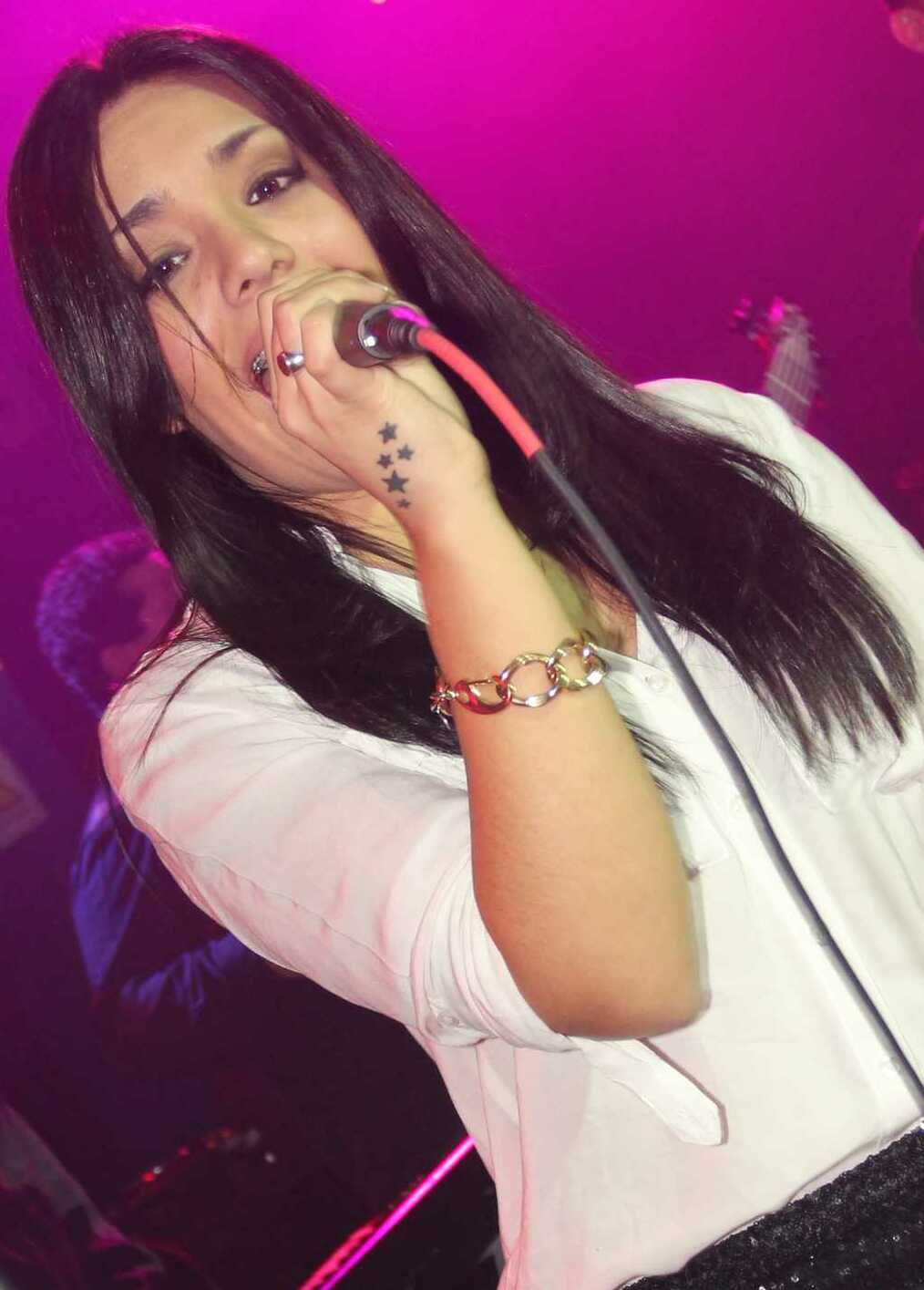
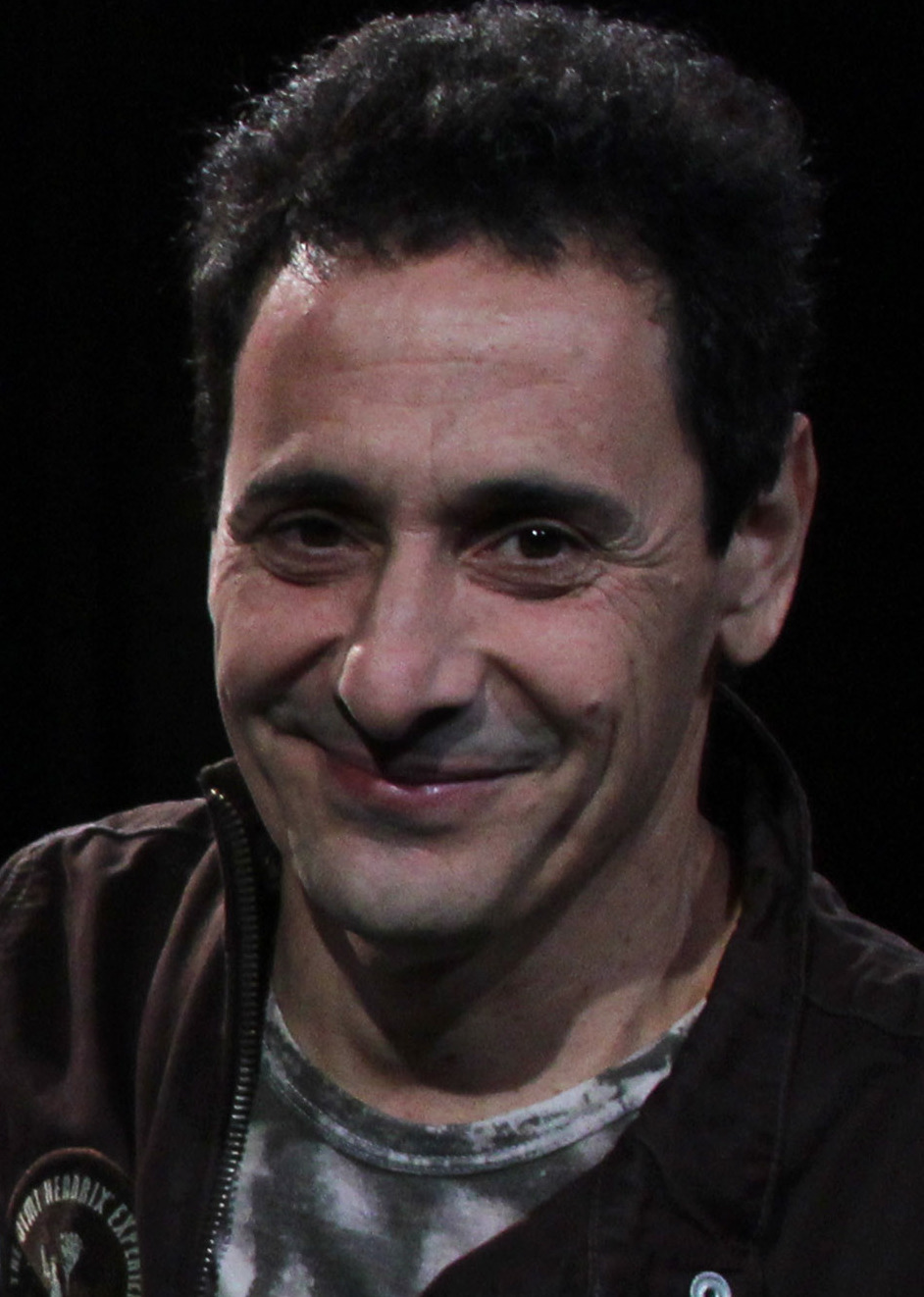
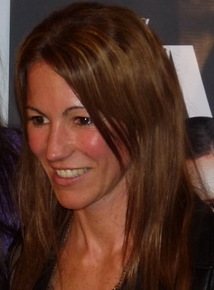
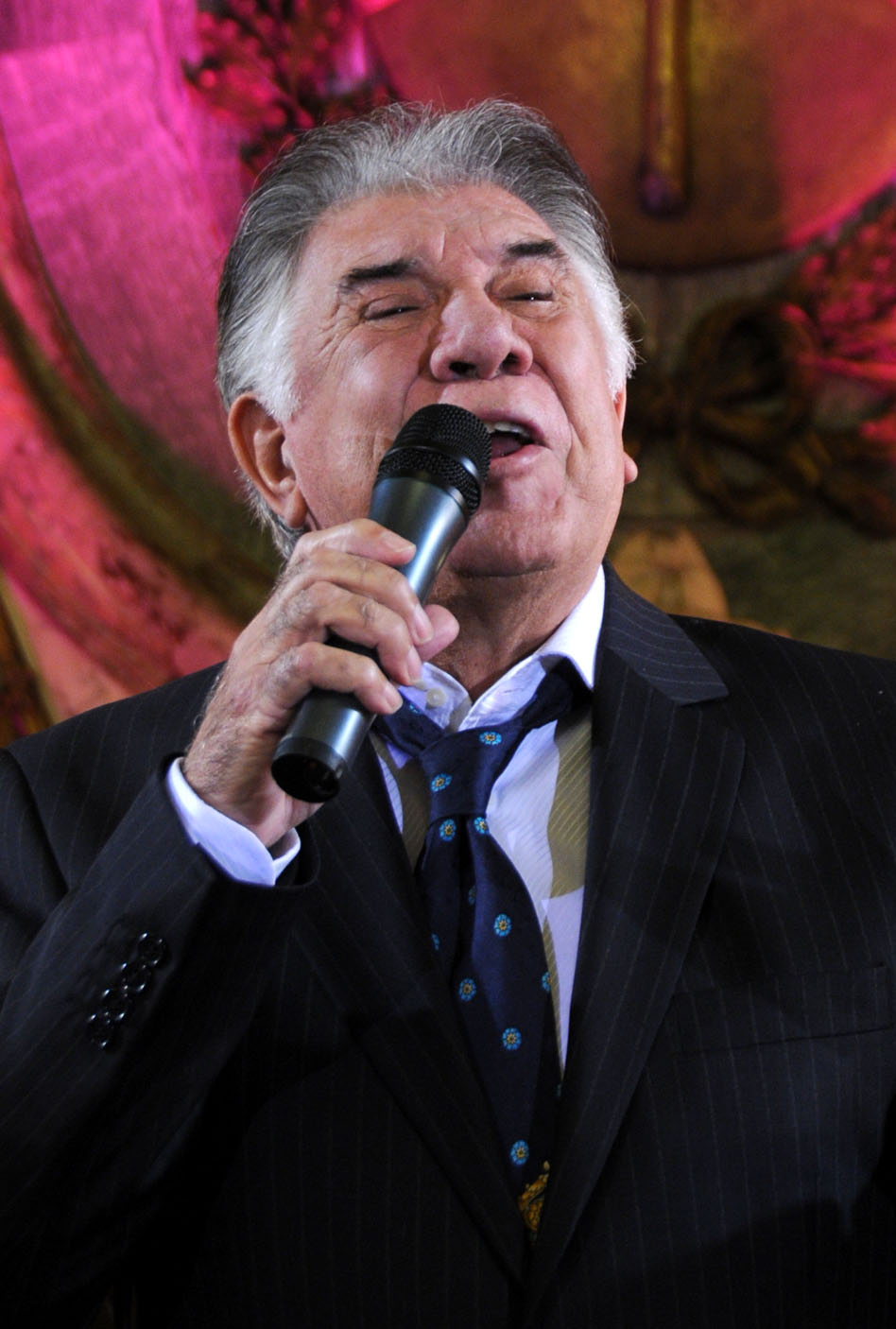
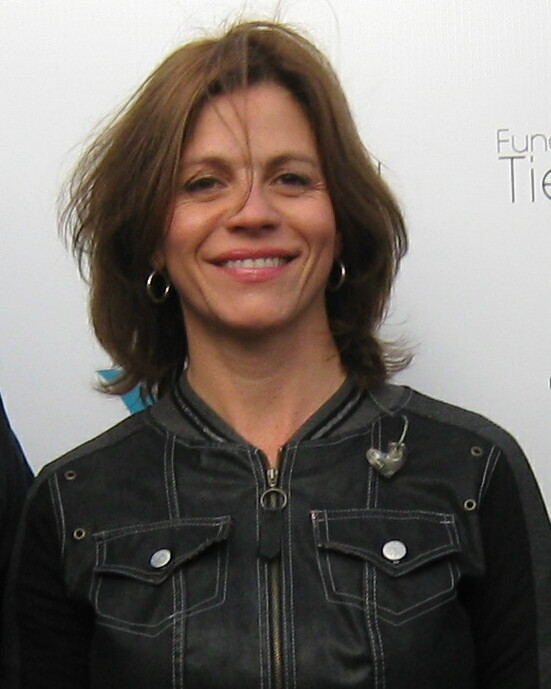
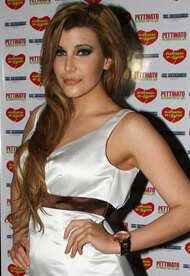
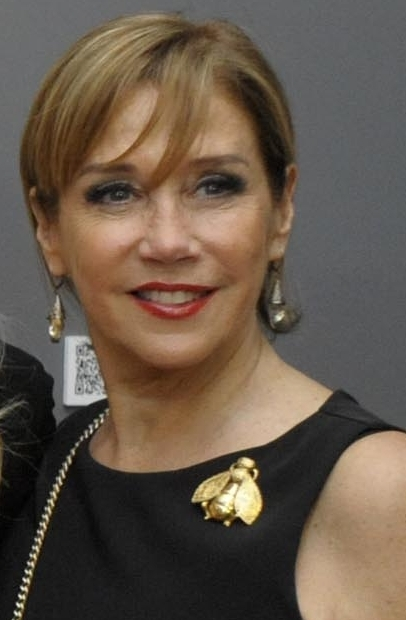
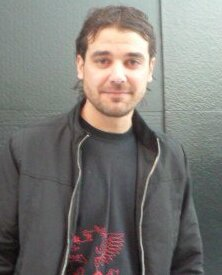
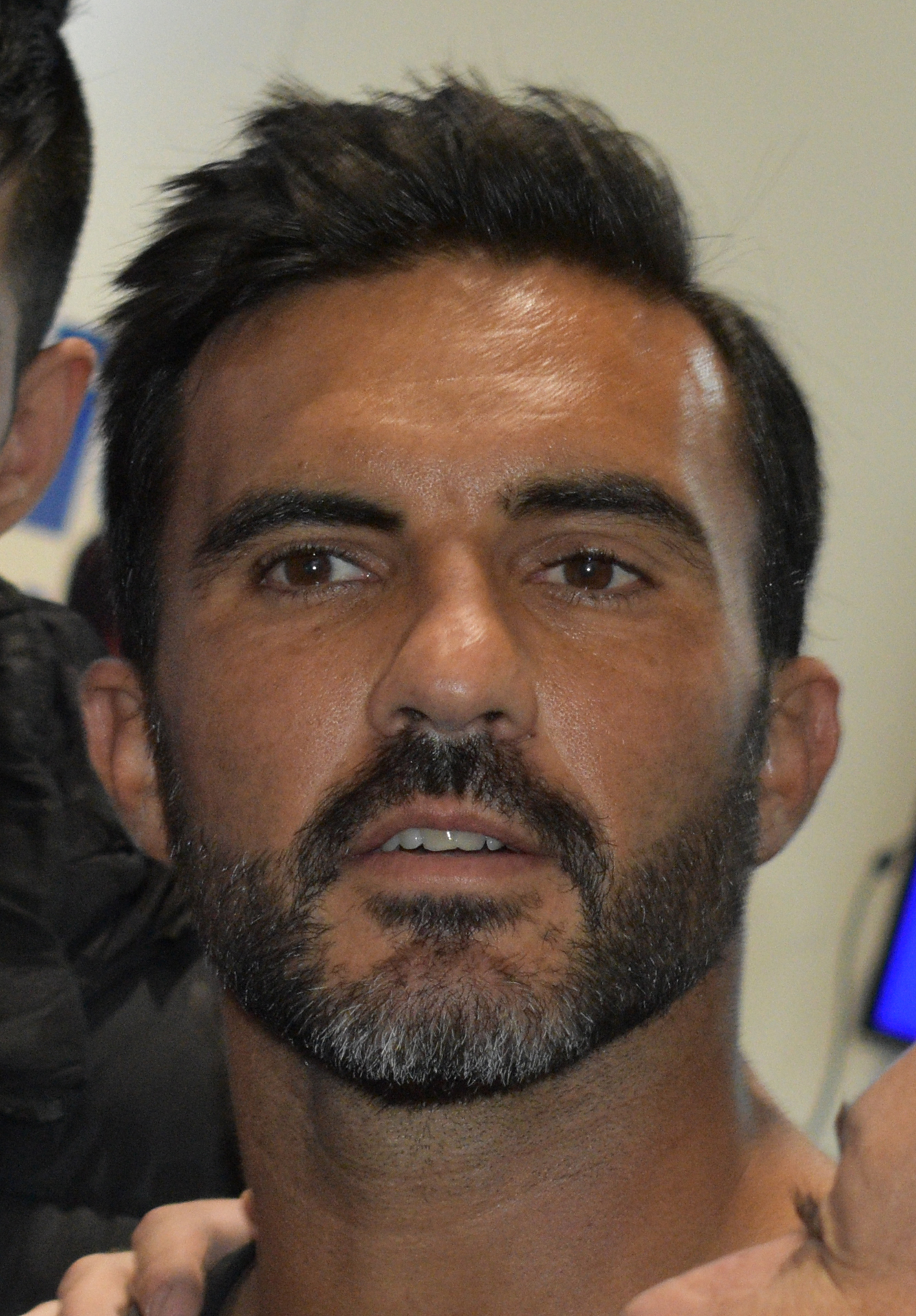
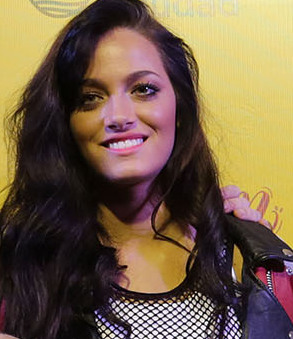
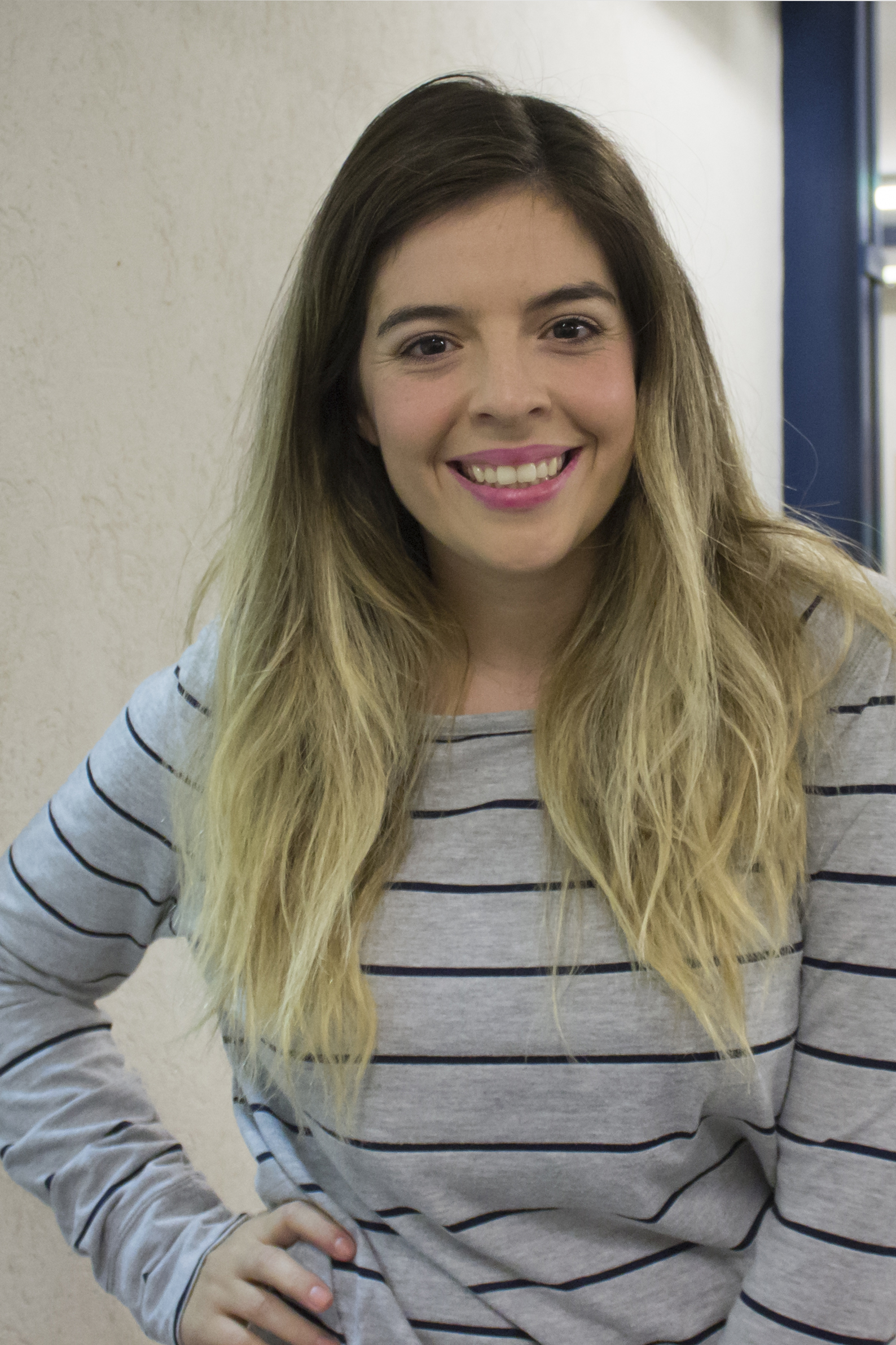
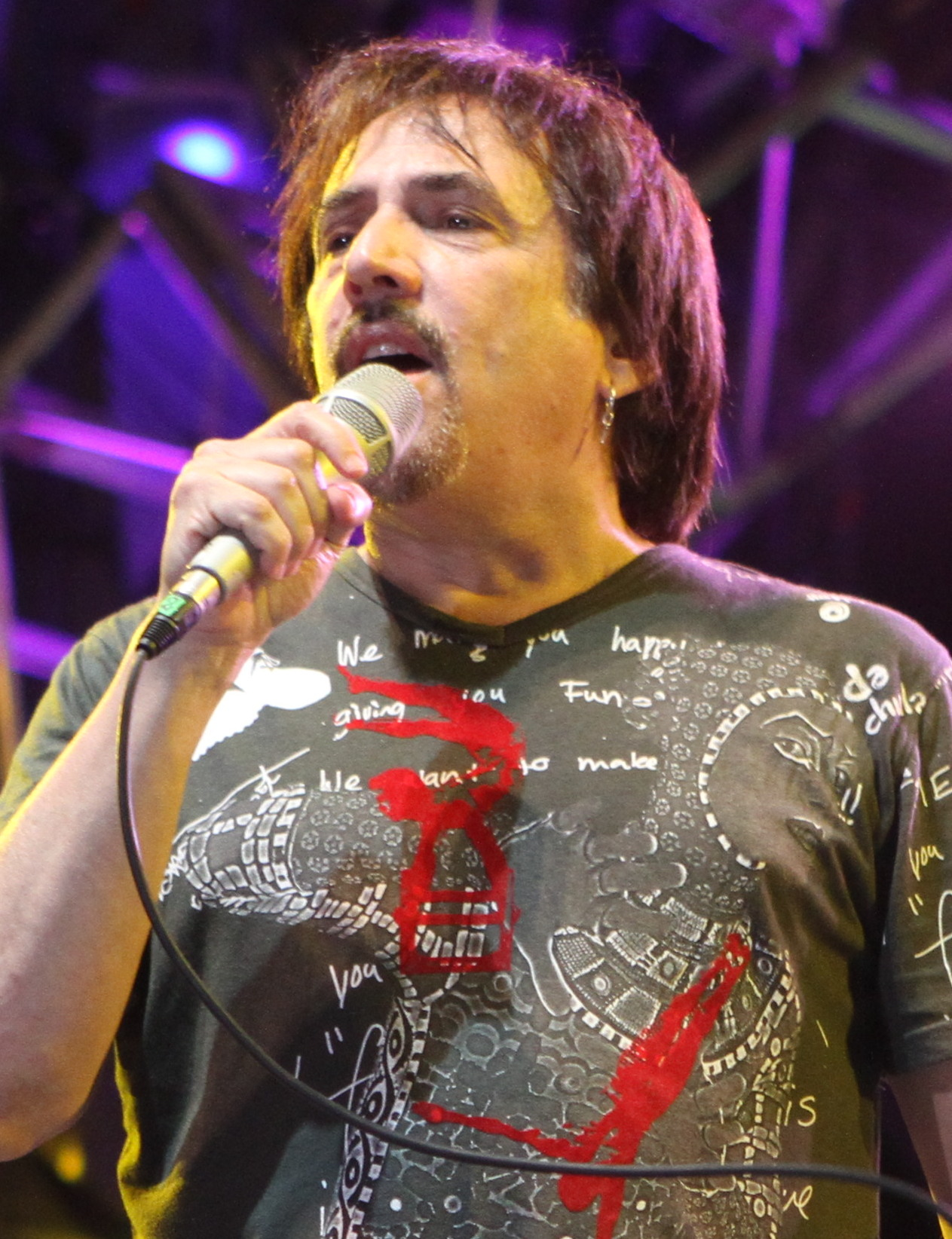
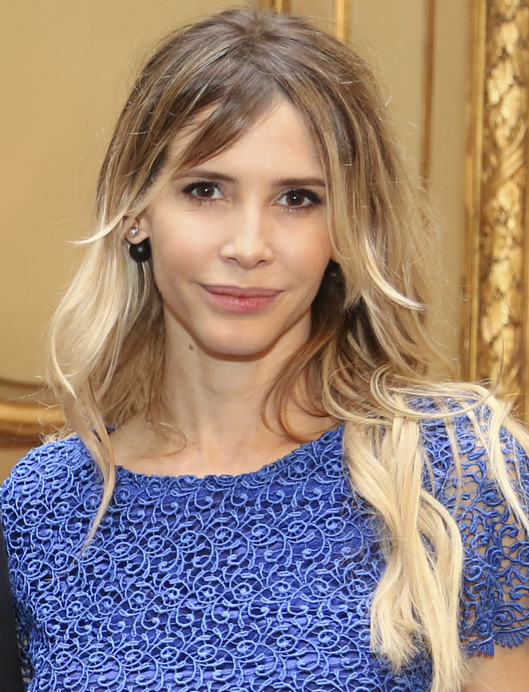
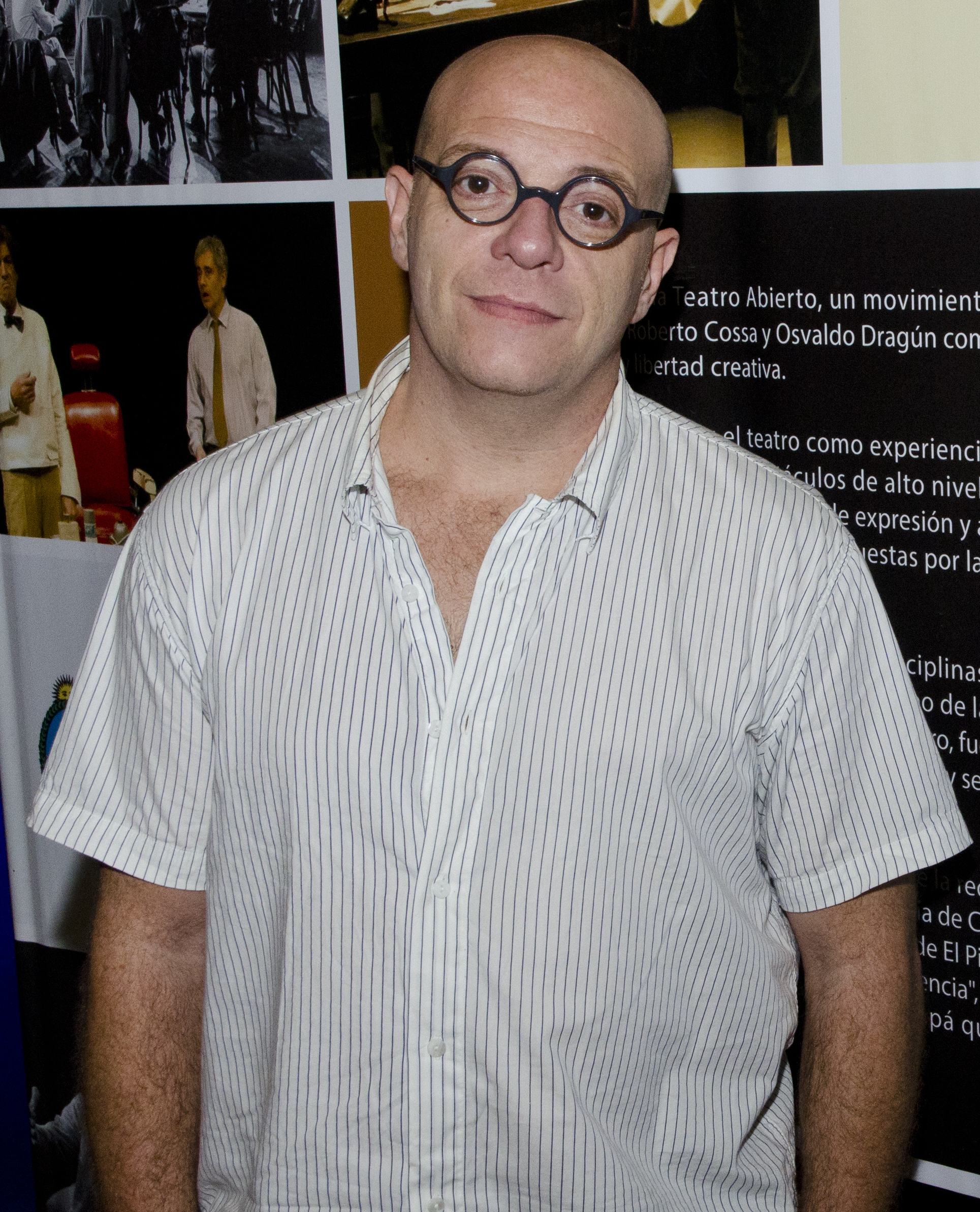
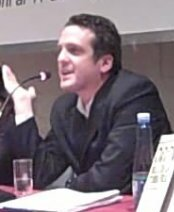
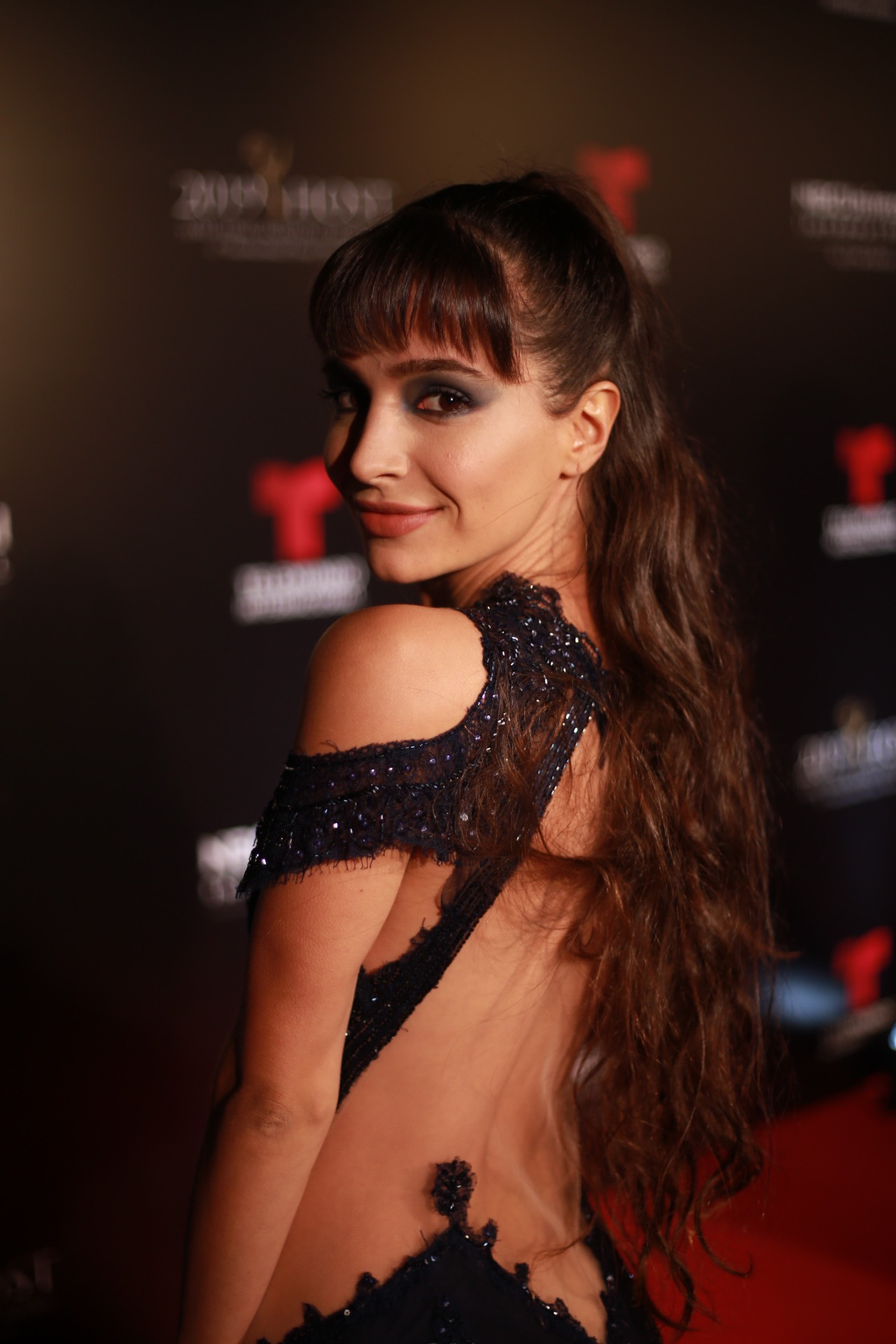
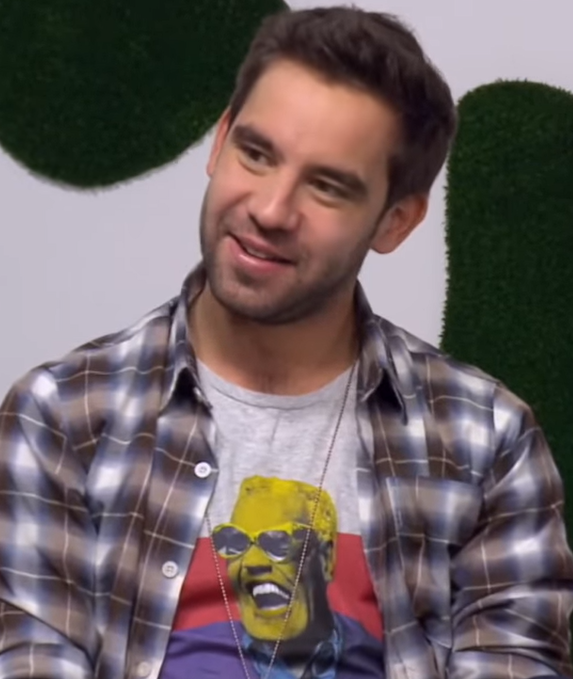
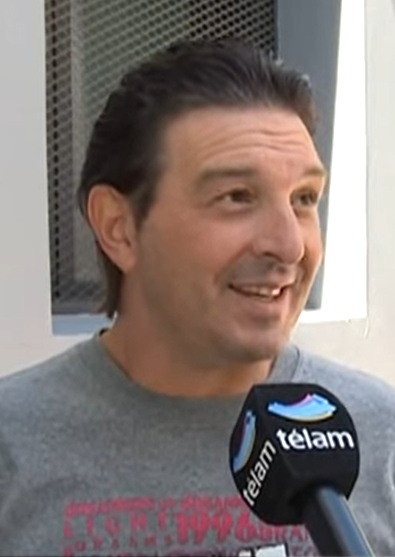
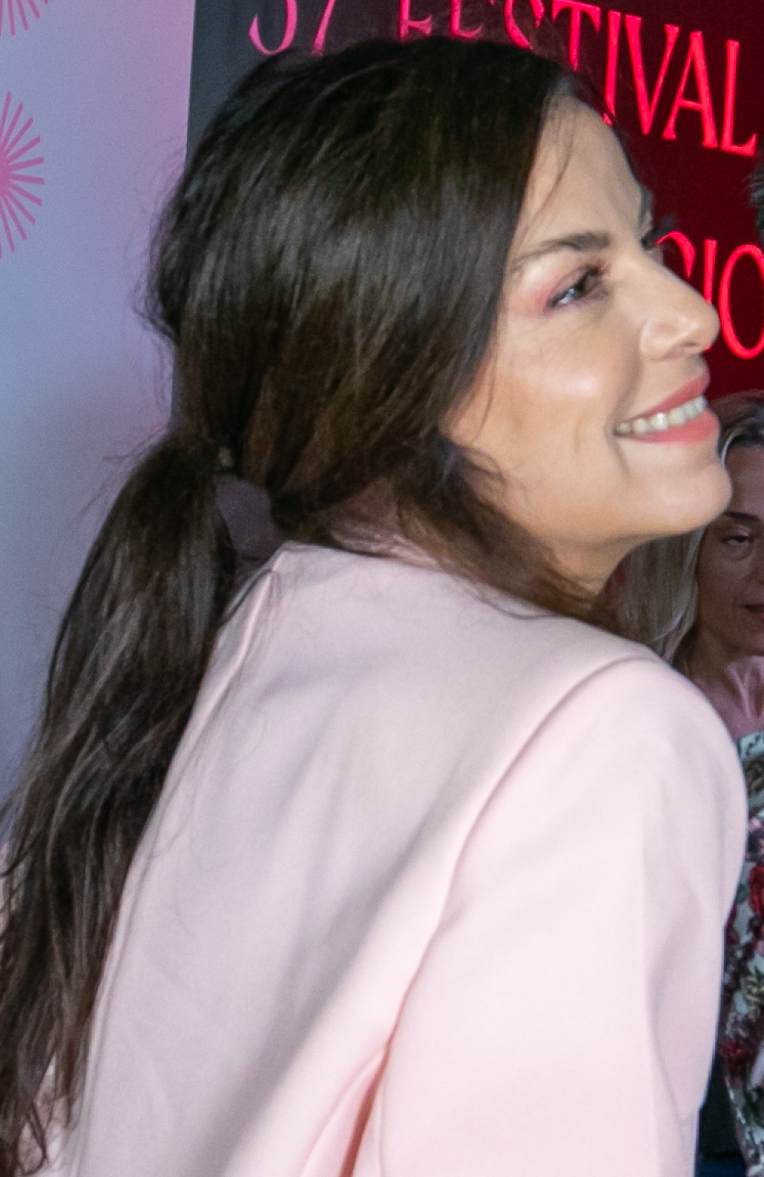
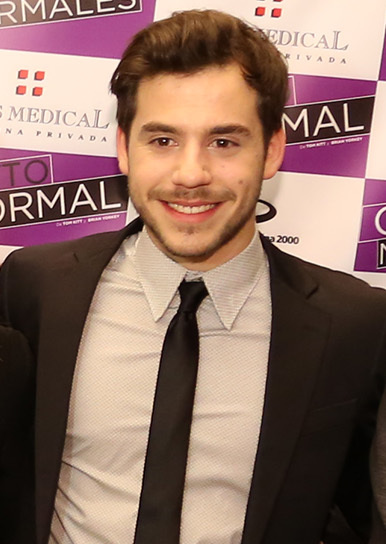
The celebrities who competed in the first season of ¿Quién es la máscara?, pictured in order of elimination:
Guillermo Coria ("Pirate Turtle"), Marta Minujín ("Seahorse"), Ángela Leiva ("Elephant"), Ricardo Mollo ("Dinosaur"), Magdalena Aicega ("Sun and Moon"), Raúl Lavié ("Monster"), Santiago Maratea ("Minecraft"), Marcela Morelo ("Black Swan"), Cristina Pérez ("Flower"), Charlotte Caniggia ("Alien Woman"), Marcela Tinayre ("Pig"), Pedro Alfonso ("Peacock"), Fabián Cubero ("Chameleon"), Oriana Sabatini ("Dragon"), Dalma Maradona ("Frog"), Alejandro Lerner ("Robot"), Guillermina Valdés ("Pufferfish"), Martín Campilongo ("Armadillo"), Muro Szeta ("Burger"), Brenda Asnicar ("Firefly"), Agustín Sierra ("Viking"), Damián de Santo ("Dog"), Mercedes Funes ("Leopard") and Fernando Dente ("Unicorn")

== Episodes ==
=== Episode 1 (September 12) ===
Performances on the first episode
#	Stage name	Song	Identity	Result
1	Unicorn	"Thriller" by Michael Jackson	undisclosed	WIN
2	Pirate Turtle	"De Musica Ligera" by Soda Stereo	Guillermo Coria	OUT
3	Viking	"Te Quiero Tanto" by Sergio Denis	undisclosed	RISK
4	Fish	"I Will Survive" by Gloria Gaynor	undisclosed	WIN
5	Monster	"Cose della vita" by Eros Ramazzotti	undisclosed	WIN
6	Pufferfish	"Miénteme" by Tini & María Becerra	undisclosed	RISK

=== Episode 2 (September 13) ===
Performances on the second episode
#	Stage name	Song	Identity	Result
1	Chameleon	"La Mordidita" by Ricky Martin feat. Yotuel	undisclosed	RISK
2	Alien Woman	"Sweet Child o' Mine" by Guns N' Roses	undisclosed	WIN
3	Robot	"Entre Nosotros" by Tiago PZK & Lit Killah	undisclosed	WIN
4	Seahorse	"Satisfaction" by The Rolling Stones	Marta Minujín	OUT
5	Leopard	"Girl on Fire" by Alicia Keys	undisclosed	WIN
6	Armadillo	"Ji Ji Ji" by Patricio Rey y sus Redonditos de Ricota	undisclosed	RISK

=== Episode 3 (September 14) ===
Performances on the third episode
#	Stage name	Song	Identity	Result
1	Dog	"I Got You (I Feel Good) / "Get Up (I Feel Like Being a) Sex Machine" by James Brown	undisclosed	WIN
2	Peacock	"Persiana Americana" by Soda Stereo	undisclosed	RISK
3	Burger	"Welcome to the Jungle" by Guns N' Roses	undisclosed	WIN
4	Elephant	"Unstoppable" by Sia	Ángela Leiva	OUT
5	Sun and Moon	"Dancing In the Dark" by Bruce Springsteen	undisclosed	RISK
6	Pig	"Todos Me Miran" by Gloria Trevi	undisclosed	WIN

=== Episode 4 (September 15) ===
Performances on the fourth episode
#	Stage name	Song	Identity	Result
1	Firefly	"I Kissed a Girl" by Katy Perry	undisclosed	WIN
2	Dinosaur	"Contigo en la Distancia" by Luis Miguel	Ricardo Mollo	OUT
3	Cyclops	"Always on My Mind" by Elvis Presley	undisclosed	RISK
4	Toucan	"Soy" by Lali	undisclosed	WIN
5	Minecraft	"Bad Guy" by Billie Eilish	undisclosed	WIN
6	Black Swan	"Titanium" by David Guetta feat. Sia	undisclosed	RISK

=== Episode 5 (September 18) ===
Performances on the fifth episode
#	Stage name	Song	Identity	Result
1	Pufferfish	"We Found Love" by Rihanna feat. Calvin Harris	undisclosed	WIN
2	Peacock	"Provócame" by Chayanne	undisclosed	RISK
3	Sun and Moon	"I Was Made for Lovin' You" by Kiss	Magdalena Aicega	OUT
4	Viking	"El Revelde" by La Renga	undisclosed	WIN
5	Armadillo	"Fly Me to the Moon" by Frank Sinatra	undisclosed	WIN
6	Black Swan	"Wapo Traketero" by Nicki Nicole	undisclosed	RISK
7	Cyclops	"Trátame Suavemente" by Soda Stereo	undisclosed	WIN
8	Chameleon	"Tutu" by Camilo & Pedro Capó	undisclosed	RISK

=== Episode 6 (September 19) ===
Performances on the sixth episode
#	Stage name	Song	Identity	Result
1	Cyclops	"Universo Paralelo" by La K'onga & Nahuel Pennisi	undisclosed	WIN
2	Burger	"A Little Respect" by Erasure	undisclosed	RISK
3	Monster	"Georgia on My Mind" by Ray Charles	Raúl Lavié	OUT
4	Fish	"Otra Noche" by Los Ángeles Azules & Nicki Nicole	undisclosed	RISK
5	Dog	"Believer" by Imagine Dragons	undisclosed	WIN

=== Episode 7 (September 20) ===
Performances on the seventh episode
#	Stage name	Song	Identity	Result
1	Viking	"Bzrp Music Sessions, Vol. 48" by Bizarrap & Tiago PZK	undisclosed	WIN
2	Unicorn	"I Don't Want to Miss a Thing" by Aerosmith	undisclosed	RISK
3	Minecraft	"Te Llevaré" by Los Palmeras	Santiago Maratea	OUT
4	Armadillo	"Vida de Rico" by Camilo	undisclosed	WIN
5	Alien Woman	"Sin Pijama" by Becky G & Natti Natasha	undisclosed	RISK

=== Episode 8 (September 21) ===
Performances on the eighth episode
#	Stage name	Song	Identity	Result
1	Pufferfish	"Se Me Ha Perdido Un Corazón" by Gilda	undisclosed	RISK
2	Pig	"03 03 456" by Raffaella Carrà	undisclosed	WIN
3	Black Swan	"Man! I Feel Like a Woman!" by Shania Twain	Marcela Morelo	OUT
4	Peacock	"Spaghetti del Rock" by Divididos	undisclosed	WIN
5	Leopard	"Tusa" by Karol G & Nicki Minaj	undisclosed	RISK

=== Episode 9 (September 22) ===
Performances on the ninth episode
#	Stage name	Song	Identity	Result
1	Chameleon	"Súbeme la Radio" by Enrique Iglesias feat. Descemer Bueno & Zion & Lennox	undisclosed	RISK
2	Toucan	"Hawái" by Maluma	undisclosed	WIN
Wildcard	Flower	"Flashdance... What a Feeling" by Irene Cara	Cristina Pérez	OUT
4	Firefly	"Ni una Sola Palabra" by Paulina Rubio	undisclosed	RISK
5	Robot	"Get Lucky" by Daft Punk feat. Pharrell Williams & Nile Rodgers	undisclosed	WIN

=== Episode 10 (September 25) ===
Performances on the tenth episode
#	Stage name	Song	Identity	Result
1	Chameleon	"Como Me Voy a Olvidar" by Los Auténticos Decadentes	undisclosed	WIN
2	Alien Woman	"Toxic" by Britney Spears	Charlotte Caniggia	OUT
3	Leopard	"Diamonds" by Rihanna	undisclosed	RISK
4	Unicorn	"Todo de Ti" by Rauw Alejandro	undisclosed	WIN
5	Firefly	"Poker Face" by Lady Gaga	undisclosed	WIN
6	Pufferfish	"Te Dejo Madrid" by Shakira	undisclosed	RISK
7	Fish	"Don't Start Now" by Dua Lipa	undisclosed	WIN
8	Burger	"No Voy En Tren" by Charly García	undisclosed	RISK

=== Episode 11 (September 26) ===
Performances on the eleventh episode
#	Stage name	Song	Result	
1	Pig	"Solo Se Vive Una Vez" by Azúcar Moreno	RISK	
Wildcard	Frog	"Despechá" by Rosalía	SAFE	
3	Viking	"Nothing Else Matters" by Metallica	RISK	
4	Burger	"Mujer Amante" by Rata Blanca	SAFE	
Duel			Identity	Result
1	Pig	"Quizás, Quizás, Quizás" by Osvaldo Farrés	Marcela Tinayre	OUT
2	Viking	"Demoliendo Hoteles" by Charly García	undisclosed	SAFE

=== Episode 12 (September 27) ===
Performances on the twelfth episode
#	Stage name	Song	Result	
1	Toucan	"Lloviendo Estrellas" by Cristian Castro	SAFE	
2	Pufferfish	"Antes de Perderte" by Duki	RISK	
3	Firefly	"Inevitable" by Shakira	SAFE	
4	Peacock	"Dance Crip" by Trueno	RISK	
Duel			Identity	Result
1	Peacock	"Tacones Rojos" by Sebastián Yatra	Pedro Alfonso	OUT
2	Pufferfish	"A Sky Full of Stars" by Coldplay	undisclosed	SAFE

=== Episode 13 (September 28) ===
Performances on the thirteenth episode
#	Stage name	Song	Result	
1	Dog	"Maravillosa Esta Noche" by JAF	SAFE	
2	Fish	"Crazy in Love" by Beyoncé feat. Jay-Z	RISK	
3	Armadillo	"Un Beso y Una Flor" by Nino Bravo	RISK	
4	Unicorn	"Corazón Mentiroso" by Karina	SAFE	
Duel			Identity	Result
1	Fish	"Acaramelao" by María Becerra	Fátima Flórez	OUT
2	Armadillo	"Bella ciao" by Manu Pilas	undisclosed	SAFE

=== Episode 14 (September 29) ===
Performances on the fourteenth episode
#	Stage name	Song	Result	
1	Robot	"Uptown Funk" by Mark Ronson feat. Bruno Mars	SAFE	
2	Chameleon	"Corazón" by Maluma feat. Nego do Borel	RISK	
3	Leopard	"Dance Monkey" by Tones and I	RISK	
4	Cyclops	"Por Lo Que Yo Te Quiero" by Rodrigo	SAFE	
Duel			Identity	Result
1	Leopard	"Vivir Así es Morir de Amor" by Camilo Sesto	undisclosed	SAFE
2	Chameleon	"Reggaetón Lento" by CNCO	Fabián Cubero	OUT

=== Episode 15 (October 2) ===
Performances on the fifteenth episode
#	Stage name	Song	Result	
1	Pufferfish & Viking	"La Tortura" by Shakira feat. Alejandro Sanz	RISK	
2	Unicorn & Firefly	"The Time of My Life" from Dirty Dancing	SAFE	
3	Leopard & Armadillo	"Paisaje" by Vicentico	SAFE	
4	Burger & Cyclops	"Rezo Por Vos" by Charly García & Luis Alberto Spinetta	RISK	
Duel			Identity	Result
1	Pufferfish	"Me Haces Tanto Bien" by Amistades Peligrosas	undisclosed	SAFE
2	Viking	"Safe and Sound" by Capital Cities	undisclosed	SAFE
3	Cyclops	"One" by U2	Yayo Guridi	OUT
4	Burger	"Ahora Te Puedes Marchar" by Luis Miguel	undisclosed	SAFE

=== Episode 16 (October 3) ===
Performances on the sixteenth episode
#	Stage name	Song	Result	
1	Pufferfish	"Tu Veneno" by Natalia Oreiro	SAFE	
Wildcard	Dragon	"Ella" by Boza	RISK	
3	Toucan	"Blinding Lights" by The Weeknd	SAFE	
4	Dog	"Ciudad Mágica" by Tan Biónica	RISK	
Duel			Identity	Result
1	Dog	"Tengo" by Sandro	undisclosed	SAFE
2	Dragon	"Sorry" by Justin Bieber	Oriana Sabatini	OUT

=== Episode 17 (October 4) ===
Performances on the seventeenth episode
#	Stage name	Song	Result	
1	Viking	"Magia Veneno" by Catupecu Machu	RISK	
2	Unicorn	"All by Myself" by Celine Dion	SAFE	
3	Frog	"La Triple T" by Tini	RISK	
4	Firefly	"Lost on You" by LP	SAFE	
Duel			Identity	Result
1	Frog	"Valerie" by Mark Ronson feat. Amy Winehouse	Dalma Maradona	OUT
2	Viking	"Intento" by Ulises Bueno	undisclosed	SAFE

=== Episode 18 (October 5) ===
Performances on the eighteenth episode
#	Stage name	Song	Result	
1	Leopard	"Proud Mary" by Tina Turner	RISK	
2	Burger	"No Me Arrepiento de Este Amor" by Attaque 77	SAFE	
3	Robot	"La Bachata" by Manuel Turizo	RISK	
4	Armadillo	"Como Alí" by Los Piojos	SAFE	
Duel			Identity	Result
1	Leopard	"Inocente" by La Delio Valdez	undisclosed	SAFE
2	Robot	"Kiss" by Prince	Alejandro Lerner	OUT

=== Episode 19 (October 6) ===
Performances on the nineteenth episode
#	Stage name	Song	Identity	Result
1	Pufferfish	"Arrasando" by Thalía	undisclosed	RISK
2	Armadillo	"Tirá para Arriba" by Miguel Mateos	undisclosed	WIN
3	Firefly	"...Baby One More Time" by Britney Spears	undisclosed	WIN
4	Toucan	"Nada es Imposible" by Ricky Martin	Damián Betular	OUT
5	Unicorn	"Ocho Cuarenta" by Rodrigo	undisclosed	WIN
6	Burger	"The Final Countdown" by Europe	undisclosed	RISK

=== Episode 20 (October 9) ===
Performances on the twentieth episode
#	Stage name	Song	Result	
1	Leopard & Unicorn	"Lady Marmalade" by Christina Aguilera, Lil' Kim, Mýa & Pink	WIN	
2	Firefly & Dog	"Tan Sólo Tú" by Franco De Vita by Alejandra Guzmán	RISK	
3	Viking & Armadillo	"Yo No Te Pido La Luna" by Daniela Romo	WIN	
4	Pufferfish & Burger	"You're the One That I Want" by John Travolta & Olivia Newton-John	RISK	
Duel			Identity	Result
1	Dog	"Antes y Después" by Ciro y los Persas	undisclosed	SAFE
2	Pufferfish	"Y Yo Sigo Aquí" by Paulina Rubio	Guillermina Valdés	OUT

=== Episode 21 (October 10) ===
Performances on the twenty-first episode
#	Stage name	Song	Identity	Result
1	Unicorn	"Roar" by Katy Perry	undisclosed	SAFE
2	Burger	"Selva" by La Portuaria	undisclosed	RISK
3	Firefly	"Héroe" by Mariah Carey	undisclosed	SAFE
4	Viking	"Should I Stay or Should I Go" by The Clash	undisclosed	SAFE
5	Armadillo	"Fue Amor" by Fito Páez	Martín Campilongo	OUT
6	Dog	"Ya No Hay Forma de Pedir Perdon" by David Lebón & Pedro Aznar	undisclosed	SAFE
7	Leopard	"Baby" by Nicki Nicole	undisclosed	SAFE

=== Episode 22 (October 11) ===
Performances on the twenty-second episode
#	Stage name	Song	Identity	Result
1	Zebra	"Blue Suede Shoes" by Elvis Presley	Donato De Santis	GUEST
2	Dog	"Será Que No Me Amas" by Luis Miguel	undisclosed	RISK
3	Viking	"Mi Perro Dinamita" by Patricio Rey y sus Redonditos de Ricota	undisclosed	WIN
4	Firefly	"When Love Takes Over" by David Guetta ft. Kelly Rowland	undisclosed	WIN
5	Leopard	"No Me Acuerdo" by Thalía & Natti Natasha	undisclosed	RISK
6	Burger	"Igual Que Ayer" by Enanitos Verdes	Mauro Szeta	OUT
7	Unicorn	"Una Cerveza" by Ráfaga	undisclosed	WIN

=== Episode 23 (October 12) - Semifinal ===
Performances on the twenty-third episode
#	Stage name	Song	Identity	Result
1	Firefly	"Ya Fue" by Fabiana Cantilo	Brenda Asnicar	OUT
2	Dog	"Quevedo: Bzrp Music Sessions, Vol. 52" by Bizarrap & Quevedo	undisclosed	SAFE
3	Leopard	"Heart of Glass" by Blondie	undisclosed	SAFE
4	Unicorn	"Vuelve" by Ricky Martin	undisclosed	RISK
5	Viking	"Are You Gonna Go My Way" by Lenny Kravitz	Agustín Sierra	OUT

=== Episode 24 (October 13) - Finale ===
==== Round One ====
Performances on the final episode – round one
#	Stage name	Song
1	Leopard & Soledad Pastorutti	"Lágrimas y Flores" by Soledad feat. Natalie Pérez
2	Dog & Alejandro Lerner	"Después De Ti" by Alejandro Lerner
3	Unicorn & Joaquín Levinton	"Yo no me quiero casar, y usted?" by Turf

==== Round Two ====
Performances on the final episode – round two
#	Stage name	Song	Identity	Result
1	Dog	"Feeling Good" by Michael Bublé	Damián de Santo	THIRD
2	Unicorn	"Bohemian Rhapsody" by Queen	Fernando Dente	WINNER
3	Leopard	"Tu Falta de Querer" by Mon Laferte	Mercedes Funes	RUNNER-UP

== Ratings ==
No.	Title	Air date	Timeslot (UTC)	Rating (millions)	Ref(s)
1	Episode 1	September 12, 2022	Monday 22:30 p.m.	17.3	
2	Episode 2	September 13, 2022	Tuesday 22:30 p.m.	11.7	
3	Episode 3	September 14, 2022	Wednesday 22:30 p.m.	11.2	
4	Episode 4	September 15, 2022	Thursday 22:30 p.m.	10.3	
5	Episode 5	September 18, 2022	Sunday 22:30 p.m.	9.6	
6	Episode 6	September 19, 2022	Monday 22:30 p.m.	9.0	
7	Episode 7	September 20, 2022	Tuesday 22:30 p.m.	9.8	
8	Episode 8	September 21, 2022	Wednesday 22:30 p.m.	9.7	
9	Episode 9	September 22, 2022	Thursday 22:30 p.m.	9.3	
10	Episode 10	September 25, 2022	Sunday 22:30 p.m.	8.9	´
11	Episode 11	September 26, 2022	Monday 22:30 p.m.	8.2	
12	Episode 12	September 27, 2022	Tuesday 22:30 p.m.	6.6	
13	Episode 13	September 28, 2022	Wednesday 22:30 p.m.	7.4	
14	Episode 14	September 29, 2022	Thursday 22:30 p.m.	8.2	
15	Episode 15	October 2, 2022	Sunday 22:30 p.m.	9.0	
16	Episode 16	October 3, 2022	Monday 22:30 p.m.	8.9	
17	Episode 17	October 4, 2022	Tuesday 22:30 p.m.	8.8	
18	Episode 18	October 5, 2022	Wednesday 22:30 p.m.	7.9	
19	Episode 19	October 6, 2022	Thursday 22:30 p.m.	7.4	
20	Episode 20	October 9, 2022	Sunday 22:30 p.m.	8.1	
21	Episode 21	October 10, 2022	Monday 22:30 p.m.	7.7	
22	Episode 22	October 11, 2022	Tuesday 22:30 p.m.	8.2	
23	Episode 23	October 12, 2022	Wednesday 22:30 p.m.	7.9	
24	Episode 24	October 13, 2022	Thursday 22:30 p.m.	9.9	
