= Lizy Tagliani =

Argentine actress, comedian, and presenter

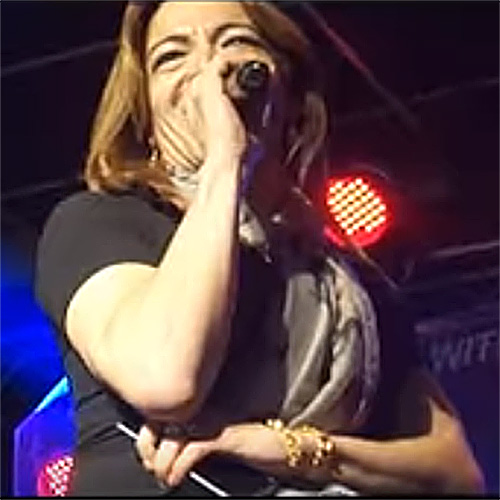
- Tagliani in 2016
- Born: 12 September 1970 (age 55); Resistencia, Chaco, Argentina
- Occupations: Actress; comedian; presenter
- Spouse: Sebastián Nebot (m. 2023)
- Awards: Martín Fierro Radio Award (2017)

Lizy Tagliani (born 12 September 1970) is an Argentine actress, comedian, and presenter.

== Biography ==
Lizy Tagliani was born in Resistencia, Chaco, has lived in Buenos Aires since her early childhood. At a young age, she began to work as a hairdresser for various Argentine entertainment figures, and to put on shows in nightclubs in Buenos Aires. Little by little, she gained notoriety in the media and joined radio and television programs in which she worked with personalities such as Susana Giménez, Marcelo Tinelli, Santiago del Moro, and Verónica Lozano.

She has also appeared as a comedic actress on stage and on television.

In a 2018 interview, Tagliani explained that as a trans woman, she could have changed the name and sex listed on her national ID (DNI) under the 2012 Gender Identity Law, but chose not to.

You can see how you perceive yourself, but do I have to see myself as you perceive me? No, let me have the possibility of deciding.

I don't have a DNI and I don't want it. When it first came out I didn't want to be a flag of someone's achievement, I decided.

In April 2020, Tagliani announced her engagement to boyfriend Leo Alturria via Instagram.

On June 19, 2020, Tagliani tested positive for COVID-19 after an employee of her show El precio justo (The Price is Right) was infected days before.

== Works ==
=== Films ===
Year	Title	Role	Notes	Director
2016	Me casé con un boludo	Herself	Cameo	Juan Taratuto

=== Television ===
Realities shows
Year	Name	Role	Notes
2014	Bailando 2014	Contestant replacement	
2014	Bailando 2014	Contestant	17th eliminated
2015	Bailando 2015	Contestant	12th eliminated
2016	Gran Hermano 2016: El Debate	Panelist	
2016	Gran Hermano 2016: El Debate Prime Time	Panelist	
2016	Bailando 2016	Contestant	10th eliminated
2016	Bailando 2016	Contestant replacement	
2017	Bailando 2017	Judge replacement	
2019	Pequeños gigantes	Guest judge	
2020	Divina comida	Contestant	3rd place
2022	¿Quién es la máscara?	Investigator	4th place
2023	Got Talent Argentina	Host	
2026	¿Quién es la máscara? Uruguay	Pingüina Patinadora	3rd unmasked

Year	Title	Role	Notes	Channel
2014	Bailando 2014	Replacement for "Loly" Antoniale on Adagio and Cuarteto Contestant	Eliminated 17th	El Trece
2015	Bailando 2015	Contestant	Eliminated 15th	El Trece
2016	Gran Hermano 2016: El debate	Panelist		América TV
2016	Gran Hermano 2016: El debate Prime Time	Panelist		América TV
2016	Bailando 2016	Contestant	Eliminated 10th	El Trece
2017	Quiero vivir a tu lado	Silvia Troncoso	Principal cast	El Trece
2017	Peligro: sin codificar	Humorist		Telefe
2017	Susana Giménez	Lizy, the fishwife	Sketch: "La Banana Mágica"	Telefe
2017	Bailando 2017	Replacement juror	2 episodes	El Trece
2017–2018	¿En qué mano está?	Humorist		Telefe
2017–2019	Por el mundo	Guest host	4 episodes	Telefe
2018	Cortá por Lozano	Panelist Replacement host	1 episode	Telefe
2018	Por el mundo: Mundial	Co-host		Telefe
2018	Drunk History: Pasado de Copas	Narrator	Episode: "El General, los caniches y La Diva"	Telefe
2018	La Peña de Morfi	Replacement co-host	1 episode	Telefe
2019–present	El Precio Justo	Host		Telefe
2019–present	El Precio Justo, Especial Famosos	Host		Telefe
2019	Susana Giménez: Pequeños gigantes	Guest juror	3 episodes	Telefe
2019	2019 Martín Fierro Digital Awards	Host		Infobae (streaming)
2020	Divina comida	Host / Guest	5 episodes	Telefe

=== Theater ===
- Mamá, quiero ser... (2014), Buenos Aires
- Casa Fantasma (2015), Carlos Paz, Buenos Aires
- La Revolución del Humor (2015), Tour
- El Show de Lizy (2016), Carlos Paz
- Recargada (2016), Tour
- Libérate (2017), Mar del Plata
- Mi vecina favorita (2018), Mar del Plata, Tour
- Lizy, una chica diferente (2019), Buenos Aires
- Los Bonobos: El amor es ciego, sordo y mudo (2020), Buenos Aires
- Annie (2026), CABA

=== Radio ===
- El club del Moro (2014–2019)

== Awards and nominations ==
Year	Awards	Category	Work nominated	Result	Refs
2015	VOS Awards	Best Woman Humorist	Casa Fantasma	Winner	
2015	Carlos Awards	Women's Debut of the Season	Casa Fantasma	Winner	
2015	Concert Star Awards	Debut	Casa Fantasma	Winner	
2016	VOS Awards	Best Woman Humorist	El Show de Lizy	Winner	
2016	Carlos Awards	Best Women's Humorous Work	El Show de Lizy	Winner	
2016	Concert Star Awards	Best Woman Humorist	El Show de Lizy	Winner	
2017	Sea Star Awards	Best Women's Comic Work	Lizy Tagliani, Liberate	Winner	
2018	Sea Star Awards	Best Women's Comedy Performance	Mi vecina favorita	Nominee	
2018	2017 Martín Fierro Television Awards	Best Humorous Work	¿En qué mano está?/Peligro: sin codificar/Susana Giménez	Nominee	
2018	2017 Martín Fierro Radio Awards	Best Humorous Work	El club del Moro	Winner	
