= Darío Sztajnszrajber =

Argentine philosopher and professor (born 1968)

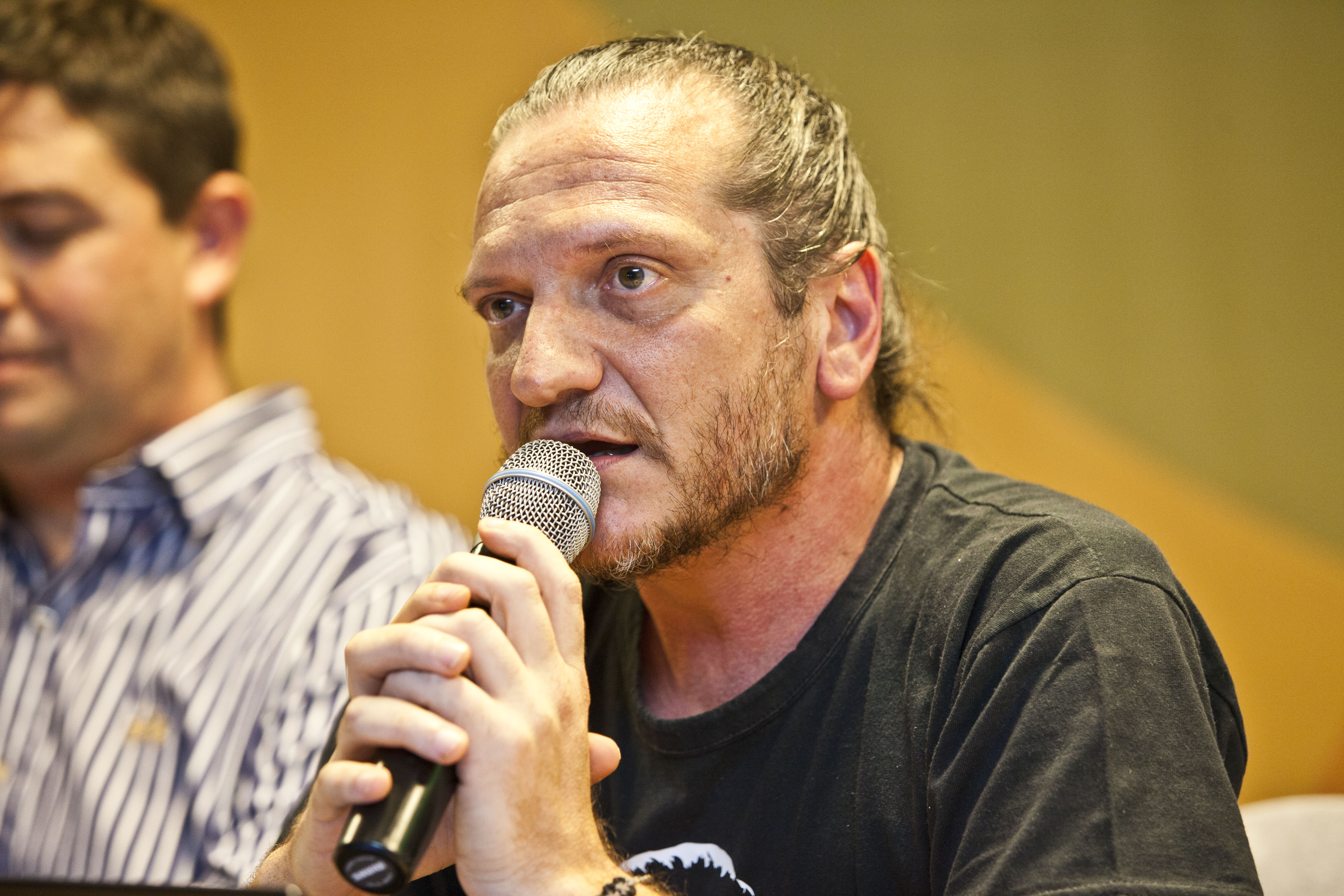
- Born: Darío Gabriel Sztajnszrajber; 16 June 1968 (age 58); Buenos Aires, Argentina
- Education: University of Buenos Aires
- Occupations: Philosopher; professor
- Relatives: Mauro Szeta (brother)

Darío Gabriel Sztajnszrajber (Rioplatense Spanish: [daˈɾi.o ʃtajnʃˈrajβeɾ]; born 16 June 1968), also known as Darío Szeta, is an Argentine philosopher, essayist, teacher, and television presenter.

== Personal life ==
Sztajnszrajber was born in Buenos Aires, Argentina to a family of Polish descent. According to Sztajnszrajber himself, his surname means "the one who writes in stone". His family is Jewish, although he's a self-proclaimed agnostic. His brother, Mauro Szeta, is a journalist who specializes in police matters. Sztajnszrajber is a supporter of the football club Estudiantes.

== Career ==
He has been a teacher at all educational levels, including primary, secondary, university and postgraduate studies in philosophy at the Latin American Social Sciences Institute and the undergraduate level at the University of Buenos Aires.

Sztajnszrajber has developed an instructive body of work in philosophy widely read throughout the Spanish speaking world for which he earned a dissemination award from the Konex Foundation in 2017. He also hosts an Argentinian TV talk program on Canal Encuentro entitled Lying About the Truth. He is also an occasional presenter or consultant on the philosophical content of radio programs, academic graphic presentations on TV and some theatrical performances.
