= Ergün Demir =

Turkish actor and musician

Ergün Demir (born 10 December 1969) is a Turkish actor and musician. He became popular in Eastern Europe and South America after his role as Ali Kemal Evliyaoğlu in the Turkish television series Binbir Gece.

Ergün Demir was born in Tepeköy, Giresun, Turkey in 1969. In 1973 (when he was 4 years old) his family moved to France, where he spent most of his life. He lived in the cities of Le Gué-De-Longroi, Auneau and Le Havre.

After graduating in 1988, he moved to Chartres, France, where he started his career as an actor.

He is currently living in Argentina, where he is a contestant on the local TV show "Bailando por un sueño" version of Dancing with the stars].
