= Maxi Trusso =

- Born: Maxi Trusso; 1 August 1970 (age 56); Buenos Aires, Argentina
- Genres: Pop; pop rock; synthpop; glam; electro-pop; dance; new wave
- Occupations: Singer-songwriter (tenor), musician, lyricist
- Instruments: Vocals, keyboards
- Years active: 1998–present
- Labels: Mercury, Acqua Records, Pirca, Republic, Interscope,

Maxi Trusso (born 1st August, 1970) is an Argentine singer-songwriter, noted for his distinctive voice. His vocal range is tenor.

== Career ==
=== Early days ===
Maxi Trusso started his first steps in music at St. George's College, Argentina, where a group of senior students (Esteban Artica, Giovanni Miano Macadam and Anthony Macadam) motivated him to give his first ‘a capella’ shows in their school freetime in the early 80s.

During the 90s while living in England he started working in the fashion industry and music, participating in projects and theater plays with European writers.

Later, he moved to Italy and formed an electro-pop group called "Roy Vedas" with an Italian artist, where he edited his first discographic work under the English label Mercury Records. His first hit with the group was a retro-futuristic styled single called "Fragments of Life", which reached number 77 on the Top of the Pops chart. The British magazine The Face chose it as one of the best three tracks of the decade.

With Roy Vedas, he played in different European countries, such as Greece, Denmark and Sweden. They also played as supporting act for the Rolling Stones presentations in Turkey.

=== Solo career ===
Back in Argentina, after gaining recognition as a solo artist, he decided to record a classic rock album with folk influences with help of Fernando Goín. His first solo work was titled Leave Me and Cry, published by label Acqua Records.

He became a successful artist thanks to his distinctive voice and his songs, mostly sung in English, which were heavily aired on radio stations and TV all over Latin America.

== Discography ==
=== Albums ===
- Leave me and cry (2006)
- Love gone (2010)
- S.O.S (2014)
- Last call (2016)

=== Singles ===
- Fragments of life (1998)
- Same Old Story (2013)
- Nothing at all (2013)
- Himno a Francisco (2014)
- Nobody is Lonely (2014)
- Taste of Love (2015)

=== Soundtracks ===
- El Firichinio (2011)
