= Mauro Szeta =

Argentine journalist (born 1973)

- Born: Mauro Sztajnszrajber; 22 March 1973 (age 53); Buenos Aires, Argentina
- Occupation: Journalist
- Relatives: Darío Sztajnszrajber (brother)

Mauro Sztajnszrajber (Rioplatense Spanish: [ˈmawɾo ʃtajnʃˈrajβeɾ]; born 22 March 1973), popularly known as Mauro Szeta, is an Argentine journalist who worked in Todo Noticias and El Trece and now C5N. He currently reports on police events.

Mauro graduated as a senior technician in journalism in 1994. He specializes in investigative journalism both in print media and audiovisual.

In 2007, with Florencia Etcheves and Liliana Caruso, he wrote the book No somos ángeles ("We are not angels") which was published by Editorial Marea.

Since 2013 he is a columnist on Radio 10 police known as Hola Chiche segment.
