= Martín Campilongo =

Argentine comedian

Martín Campilongo (generally known as Campi) is an Argentine humorist who was nominated for Best Work in Humor at the 2013 Martín Fierro Awards and appeared on the 2023 TV series El amor después del amor.
