= List of Bailando por un Sueño (Argentina) competitors =

Bailando por un Sueño is an Argentinian reality television show in which celebrity contestants and professional dance partners compete to be the best dancers, as determined by the show's judges and public voting. The series first broadcast was in 2006, and seven complete seasons have aired on El Trece. During each season, competitors are progressively eliminated on the basis of public voting and scores received from the judges until only a few contestants remain. These finalists participate in a semi-finale and a finale, from which a winner is determined. Celebrities appearing on Bailando por un Sueño include "actors, comedians, musicians, entrepreneurs, reality stars and vedettes".

As of season 7, 176 celebrities have competed, three of whom withdrew from the competition. A total of 125 professional dancers have partnered with the celebrities, and those who participated in the most seasons include Pier Fritzsche, Maximiliano D'Iorio, Gabriel Usandivaras and Juan Pablo Battaglia with four seasons each. The six winners of the show, in chronological order, are Carmen Barbieri, Florencia de la V, Carla Conte, Celina Rucci, Carolina "Pampita" Ardohain, Fabio "La Mole" Moli and Noelia Pompa & Hernán Piquín, the first couple composed by celebrities to win the competition. Professional partners who have won are Christian Ponce, Manuel Rodríguez, Guillermo Comforte, Matías Sayago, Nicolás Armengol and Mariana Conci.

== Competitors ==
In the following list, participants are shown in the inverse order of their finish in each season.

– Celebrity Winner
– Celebrity Runner-up
– Celebrity Semi-finalist
– Celebrity that withdrew
– Celebrity disqualified
– Celebrity that was eliminated and got the opportunity to come back
– In the competition

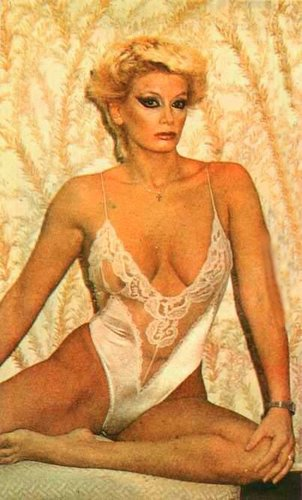
Carmen Barbieri, winner of season 1

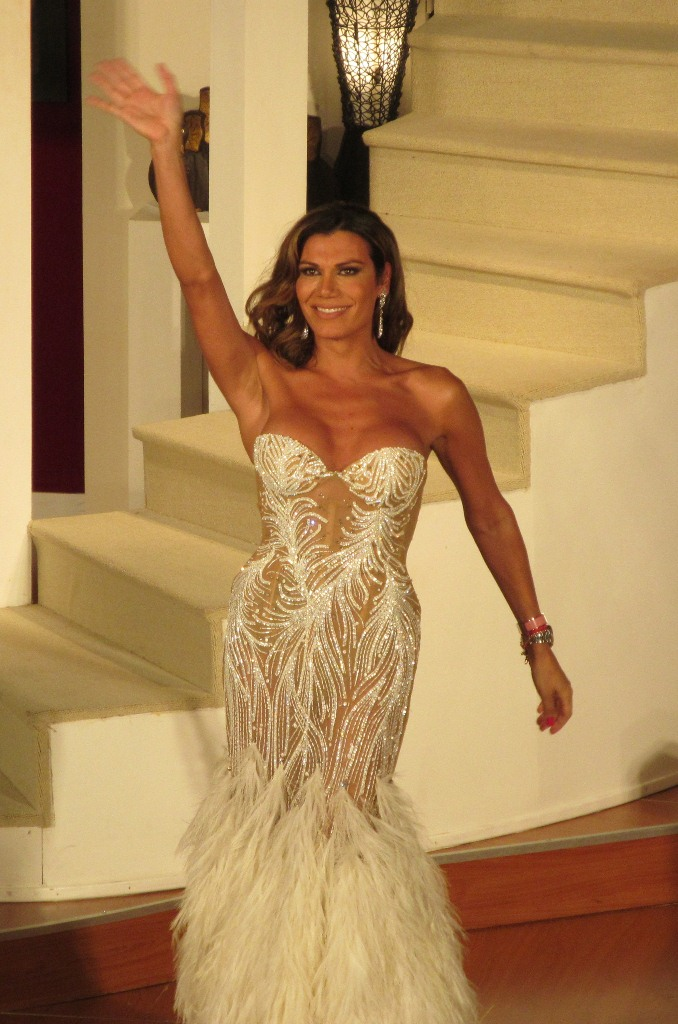
Florencia De La V, winner of season 2

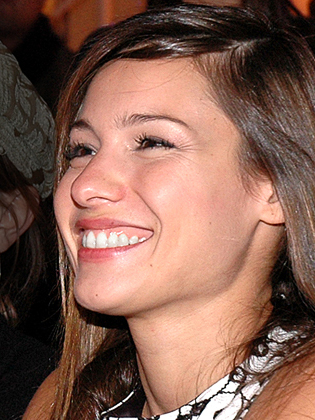
Carolina "Pampita" Ardohaín, winner of season 5

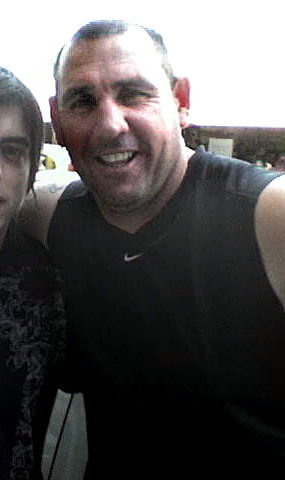
Fabio "Mole" Moli, winner of season 6

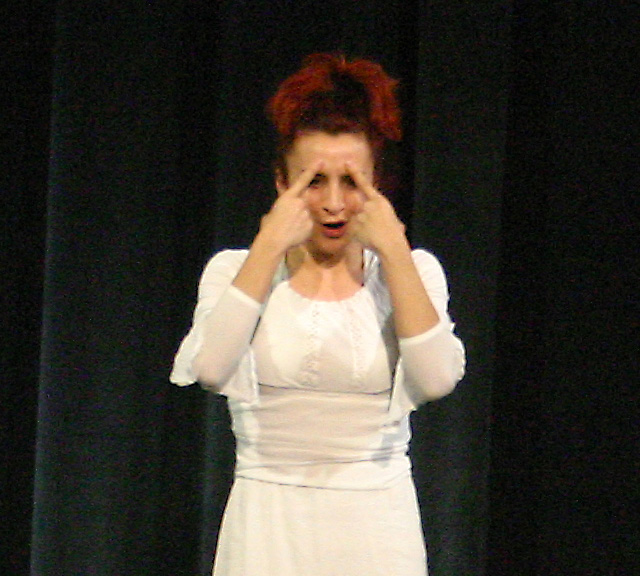
Anita Martínez, winner of season 9

Season	Celebrity	Notability/Profession	Professional partner	Place
1	Matías Santoianni	Actor	Nathalia Rodríguez	8th
1	Pamela David	Model	Pablo Giménez	7th
1	Dalma Maradona	Diego Maradona's daughter	Omar Madeo	6th
1	Guillermo Novelis	Singer	Lorena Musa	5th
1	Miguel Ángel Cherutti	Actor & Comedian	Emilia Almada	4th/3rd
1	Jésica Cirio	Model	Marcelo Petrín	4th/3rd
1	Dady Brieva	Comedian	Mirtha Lima	2nd
1	Carmen Barbieri	Actress	Christian Ponce	1st
2	Pablo Alarcón	Actor	Viviana Pérez	12th
2	Pablo Tamagnini	Singer	Fabiana Limanski	11th
2	Ana Costa	Actress	Oscar Méndez	10th
2	Boy Olmi	Actor	Lorena Paranyez	9th
2	Emanuel	Magician	Lorena Battle Ojeda	8th
2	Gino Renni	Actor	Karina Caregnato	7th
2	Silvina Luna	Model	Matías Ramírez	6th
2	Miguel del Sel	Comedian	María Leonor Ochoa	5th
2	Moria Casán	Actress, TV host & Vedette	Leonardo Piccinato	4th/3rd
2	María Eugenia Ritó	Vedette	Darío Díaz	4th/3rd
2	Emilia Attias	Actress & Model	Lucas Tortorici	2nd
2	Florencia de la V	Actress & Comedian	Manuel Rodríguez	1st
3	Alejandra Pradón	Vedette	Nicolás Avoletta	15th
3	Beatriz Salomón	Actress	Franco Contreras	14th
3	Karina Jelinek	Model	César Soria	13th
3	"Yuyito" González	Actress	Carlos Juárez	12th
3	Ginette Reynal	Former Model & TV Host	Pablo Pezet	11th
3	Marcela Acuña	Professional Boxer	Javier Riveros	10th
3	Julieta Prandi	Model & TV Host	Eduardo Garro	9th
3	Evangelina Carrozzo	Model & Environmentalist	Javier Rojas	8th
3	Eliana Guercio	Model & Vedette	Diego Viera	7th
3	Luciana Salazar	Model & Singer	Luis David Jazmín	6th
3	María Valenzuela	Actress	Matías Pedemonte	5th
3	Ximena Capristo	Model & Vedette	Guido de Paoli	4th/3rd
3	Lauda Fidalgo	Dancer	Gustavo Rojas	4th/3rd
3	María Vázquez	Top Model	Diego Bogado	2nd
3	Carla Conte	Model & TV Host	Guillermo Comforte	1st
4	Silvia Süller	TV personality	Fernando Ragnini	30th
4	Alejandra Oliveras	Boxer	Enzo Gómez	29th
4	Flavia Palmiero	TV Host	Exequiel López	28th
4	Soledad Solaro	Top Model & TV Host	Alejandro Váldez	27th
4	Carolina Oltra	Model	Nicolás Tadioli	26th
4	"Hiena" Barrios	Professional Boxer	Estefanía Canedi	Withdrew
4	Paula Morales	Model & Actress	Alejandro García	25th
4	Nina Peloso	Politic Activist	Facundo Mazzei	24th
4	Soledad Fandiño	Model & Actress	Lucas álvarez	23rd
4	Carmen Barbieri	Actress	Leandro Angelo	22nd
4	José María Listorti	Comedian & TV Host	Estefanía Canedi	21st
4	Daniel Agostini	Singer	Virginia Gallardo	20th
4	Victoria Onetto	Actress	Adrián Sánchez	19th
4	Juana Repetto	Actress	Esteban Hernández	18th
4	Gustavo Guillén	Actor	Abigail Pereira	17th
4	Iliana Calabró	Actress & Comedian	Maximiliano D'Iorio	16th
4	Anabel Cherubito	Actress	Lucas Álvarez	15th
4	Silvia Süller	TV Personality	Leandro Angelo	14th
4	Nazarena Vélez	Vedette	Facundo de Palo	13th
4	Flavia Palmiero	TV Host	Exequiel López	12th
4	Claudia Fernández	Vedette & TV Host	Maximiliano D'Iorio	11th
4	Catherine Fulop	Actress & TV Host	Rodrigo Esmella	Withdrew
4	Rocío Guirao Díaz	Top Model	Nicolás Villalba	10th
4	Matías Alé	Comedian	Gisela Bernal	9th
4	Rocío Marengo	Comedian & Model	Iván Cabrol	8th
4	María Eugenia Ritó	Vedette	Esteban Hernández	7th
4	Cinthia Fernández	Vedette	Rodrigo Esmella	6th
4	Carla Conte	Model & TV Host	Damián Duarte	5th
4	Florencia de la V	Actress & Comedian	Martín de la Iglesia	4th/3rd
4	Liz Solari	Top Model	Daniel Meza Sánchez	4th/3rd
4	Paula Robles	Dancer	Franco Tabernero	2nd
4	Celina Rucci	Model	Matías Sayago	1st
5	Natacha Jaitt	Model & Playboy Host	Cristian Falcón	39th
5	"Cicciolina" Staller	Porn Star	Joel Ledesma	Withdrew
5	Victoria Vanucci	Model	Eliseo Álvarez	38th
5	Adriana Aguirre	Former Vedette	Martín Peirano	37th
5	Gladys Florimonte	Comedian	Ariel Zambrano	36th
5	Dolores Barreiro	Top Model	Pier Fritzsche	35th
5	Belén Francese	Comedian	Diego Pappalardo	34th
5	Gabriela Bo	Model	Juan José Ávila	33rd
5	Florencia G. Córdoba	Model	Daniel Díaz	32nd
5	Verónica Varano	Former Model & TV Host	Jorge Tajomisski	31st
5	Marianela Mirra	Winner of Big Brother 4	Carlos Cruz	30th
5	Kenita Larraín	Model	Martín Whitencamp	29th
5	Jorge Ibañez	Fashion Designer	Lourdes Sánchez	28th
5	Carolina Baldini	Model	Paulo Pedernera	27th
5	Pablo Ruiz	Singer	Vanessa Gotzl	26th
5	Fernanda Callejón	Actress	Rodrigo Escobar	25th
5	Millie Stegman	Actress	Alejandro Gallego	24th
5	Serafín Zubiri	Musician	Natalia Bollini	23rd
5	Natalia Fassi	Model	Abel Faccini	2nd
5	Fernanda Vives	Vedette	Adrían Díaz	21st
5	Marcelo de Bellis	Actor	Christhel Coopman	20th
5	Sabrina Rojas	Actress	Juan Pablo Battaglia	19th
5	Adabel Guerrero	Vedette	Joel Ledesma	18th
5	Karina Jelinek	Model	Lucas González	17th
5	Evangelina Anderson	Model	Julián Carvajal	Withdrew
5	Pablo Ruiz	Singer	Vanessa Gotzl	16th
5	Natalia Fassi	Model	Abel Faccini	15th
5	Eliana Guercio	Model & Vedette	Julián Carvajal	Withdrew
5	Claudia Fernández	Vedette & TV Host	Julián Carvajal	14th
5	Mariana de Melo	Model	Jorge Tajomisski	13th
5	Matías Alé	Comedian	Gisela Bernal	12th
5	Jesica Cirio	Model	Gabriel Usandivaras	11th
5	Sofía Zámolo	Top Model & TV Host	Lucas Heredia	10th
5	"Tota" Santillán	TV Host	Virginia Dobrich	9th
5	Mónica Farro	Vedette	Nicolás Scillama	8th
5	Eunice Castro	Model	Carlos Bernal	7th
5	Adabel Guerrero	Vedette	Joel Ledesma	6th
5	Marixa Balli	Vedette	Juan Pablo Battaglia	5th
5	María Fernanda Callejón	Actress	Rodrigo Escobar	4th/3rd
5	Valeria Archimó	Dancer & Vedette	Juan Leandro Nimo	4th/3rd
5	Laura Fidalgo	Dancer	Luis Brandán	2nd
5	Carolina "Pampita" Ardohain	Top Model	Nicolás Armengol	1st
6	Miguel "Negro" Piñera	Singer	Ana Laura López	29th
6	Victoria Vanucci	Model	Diego Gómez	28th
6	Lorenzo Lamas	Actor	Milagros Michael	27th
6	Violeta Lo Re	Vedette	Martín Gómez	26th
6	Cecilia "Chechu" Bonelli	Model	Gustavo Pechetto	25th
6	Florencia "Floppy" Tesouro	Vedette	Matías Cejas	24th
6	Paola Miranda	Vedette & Singer	Gastón Fernández	23rd
6	Jimena Monteverde	Chef	Javier Romero	22nd
6	Zaira Nara	Model & TV Host	Lucas Heredia	21st
6	Belén Francese	Comedian	Hernán Doval	20th
6	Luciana Salazar	Model & Singer	Pier Fritzsche	Withdrew
6	Sarah Paddy Jones	Dancer	Nicolás Espinosa	19th
6	Evangelina Anderson	Model	Facundo Mazzei	Withdrew
6	Sabrina Rojas	Actress	Martín Whitencamp	18th
6	Mariana "Loly" Antoniale	Vedette & Model	Juan Pablo Battaglia	17th
6	Lola Ponce	Singer & Actress	Ariel Juín	16th
6	Amalia Granata	Model & TV Host	Gabriel Usandivaras	15th
6	Juana Repetto	Actress	Christian Ponce	14th
6	Jesica Cirio	Model	Rodrigo Escobar	13th
6	Andrea Ghidone	Dancer & Vedette	Emanuel González	12th
6	Emilia Attías	Actress & Model	Pablo Juín	11th
6	Sofía Pachano	Dancer, Actress & Singer	Nicolás Armengol	10th
6	Matías Alé	Comedian	Laura Fernández	9th
6	Belén Francese	Comedian	Facundo Mazzei	8th
6	Flavio Mendoza	Choreographer	Gisela Bernal	7th
6	Virginia Gallardo	Vedette & Dancer	Carlos Bernal	6th
6	Sofía Zámolo	Top Model & TV Host	Maximiliano D'Iorio	5th
6	Vanina Escudero	Dancer	Pier Fritzsche	4th/3rd
6	Silvina Escudero	Dancer	Nicolás Scillama	4th/3rd
6	Paula Chaves	Top Model	Franco Tabernero	2nd
6	Fabio "Mole" Moli	Boxer	Mariana Conci	1st
7	Rocío Marengo	Comedian & Model	Leonardo Piccinato	30th
7	Jorge "Locomotora" Castro	Former Boxer	Sofía Macaggi	29th
7	Mike Tyson	Former Boxer	Lakiha Spicer	Withdrew
7	Hernán Cabanas	Runner-up of Soñando por Bailar 1	Dominique Pestaña	28th
7	Pamela Anderson	Actress & Model	Damian Whitewood	Withdrew
7	Cristina "Negra" Galiano	Wife of Fabio "Mole" Moli	Fernando Castro	27th
7	Wanda Nara	Model	Pier Fritzsche	Withdrew
7	Jorge "Negrito" Luengo	Producer	Yanil García	26th
7	Nicole Neumann	Top Model	Nicolás Scillama	25th
7	Rocío Guirao Díaz	Top Model	Carlos Bernal	Withdrew
7	Fabio "Mole" Moli	Boxer	Mariana Conci	24th
7	Pampita Ardohain	Top Model	Carlos Bernal	Withdrew
7	José María Muscari	Actor & Producer	Emanuel González	23rd
7	Daniel G. Rinaldi	Journalist	Ana Laura López	22nd
7	Nicolás Riera	Actor & Singer	Judith Kovalovsky	21st
7	Vanina Ecudero	Dancer	Silvina Escudero	Withdrew
7	Erika Mitdank	Model	Cristian Falcón	20th
7	Evangelina Anderson	Model	Carlos Bernal	19th
7	Marcelo Iripino	Choreographer	Georgina Tirotta	18th
7	Tony Kamo	Mentalist	Sol Giuletti	17th
7	Mónica González	Wife of José M. Listorti	Maximiliano D'Iorio	16th
7	Mónica Farro	Vedette	Christian Ponce	15th
7	Zaira Nara	Top Model & TV Host	Pier Fritzsche	14th
7	Jimena Barón	Actress	Facundo Mazzei	13th
7	María Eugenia Ritó	Vedette	Nicolás Scillama	12th
7	Denise Dumas	Model & TV Host	Alejandro Gallego	11th
7	Eugenia Lemos	Winner of Soñando por bailar 1	Leonardo Piccinato	10th
7	Larissa Riquelme	Model	Fernando Bertona	9th
7	Adabel Guerrero	Vedette	Martín Whitencamp	8th
7	Silvina Escudero	Dancer	Sofía Pachano	7th
7	Cinthia Fernández	Vedette	Gabriel Usandivaras	6th
7	Pedro "Peter" Alfonso	Producer	Julieta Sciancalepore	5th
7	"Coki" Ramírez	Singer	Juan Leandro Nimo	4th/3rd
7	Paula Chaves	Top Model	Pablo Juín	4th/3rd
7	"Tito" Speranza	Security guard	Nadia Hair	2nd
7	Hernán Piquín	Dancer	Noelia Pompa	1st
8	Leandro Penna	Model	Macarena Rinaldi	26th
8	"Maravilla" Martínez	Boxer	Sofía Macaggi	Withdrew
8	Jennifer Owczarczyn	Former CDP's Contestant	Agustín Morgante	25th
8	Mariano de la Canal	Runner-up of Soñando por Bailar 2	Nadia Hair	24th
8	Micaela Breque	Model	Juan Pablo Battaglia	23rd
8	Grecia Colmenares	Actress	Juan Leandro Nimo	22nd
8	Valeria Archimó	Dancer & Vedette	Reinaldo Ojeda	Withdrew
8	Ayelén Barreiro	Figure skater	Franco Cadelago	21st
8	Ana Sans	Theatre director & Dancer	Nicolás Armengol	20th
8	Marcela Villagra	Wife of "Tito" Speranza	Cristian Falcón	19th
8	Ayelén Paleo	Vedette & Dancer	Emanuel González	18th
8	Marcela Feudale	Announcer of Showmatch	Facundo Mazzei	17th
8	Liz Solari	Top Model	Daniel Meza Sánchez	Withdrew
8	Floppy Tesouro	Model	Christian Ponce	16th
8	Karina Jelinek	Model	Maximiliano D'Iorio	Withdrew
8	Charlotte Caniggia	Claudio Caniggia's daughter	Alejandro Gallego	15th
8	Adabel Guerrero	Vedette	Reinaldo Ojeda	14th
8	Beto César	Comedian	Melina Greco	13th
8	María Vázquez	Top Model	Marcos Gorosito	12th
8	Cristian Urrizaga	Winner of Big Brother 6	Laura Fernández	11th
8	Verónica Perdomo	Model & Hostess	Pablo Juin	10th
8	Alexander Caniggia	Claudio Caniggia's son	Sofía Macaggi	9th
8	Alexandra Larsson	Model	Maximiliano D'Iorio	8th
8	Andrea Rincón	Vedette	Pier Fritzsche	7th
8	Federico Bal	Carmen Barbieri's son	Yanil García	6th
8	Matías Alé	Comedian	Soledad Bayona	5th
8	Florencia Peña	Actress	Nicolás Scillama	4th/3rd
8	Paula Chaves	Top Model	"Peter" Alfonso	4th/3rd
8	Magdalena Bravi	Winner of Soñando por Bailar 2	Jorge Moliniers	2nd
8	Hernán Piquín	Dancer	Noelia Pompa	1st
9	Victoria Saravia	Model	Gonzalo Gerber	27th
9	Paula Chaves	Top Model	"Peter" Alfonso	Withdrew
9	Evelyn von Brocke	Journalist	Fernando Bertona	26th
9	Mimí Pons	Actress	Pablo Juin	25th
9	Yanina Latorre	Journalist	Jorge Moliniers	24th
9	Martín Liberman	Sports journalist	Ana Laura López	23rd
9	Karina Jelinek	Model	Maximiliano D'Iorio	22nd
9	Matías Alé	Comedian	Sabrina Ravelli	21st
9	Miriam Lanzoni	Actress	Maximiliano D'Iorio	20th
9	Maximiliano Guerra	Dancer	Patricia Baca	19th
9	Victoria Xipolitakis	Model	Cristian Falcón	18th
9	Luciano Tirri	Marcelo Tinelli's cousin	Bárbara Really	17th
9	"Loly" Antoniale	Vedette & Model	Cristian Ponce	16th
9	María Eugenia Ritó	Vedette	Fernando Bertona	15th
9	Fátima Flórez	Comedian & Dancer	Freddy Villareal	14th
9	Sixto Valdés	Hair stylist	Mariana Limeres	13th
9	Rosmery González	Dancer	Patricio Sauc	12th
9	Lizy Tagliani	Hair stylist	Gabriel Usandivaras	11th
9	Mora Godoy	Dancer	Marcos Ayala	10th
9	Aníbal Pachano	Theatral Director	Laura Fernández	9th
9	Diego Reinhold	Actor & Comedian	María Lourdes Sánchez	8th
9	Eleonora Cassano	Dancer	Nicolás Scillama/Pablo Juin	7th
9	Laura Fidalgo	Dancer	Martín Pico	6th
9	"Peter" Alfonso	Television Producer	Florencia Viterbo	5th
9	Jésica Cirio	Model	Juan Carlos Acosta	4th/3rd
9	Noelia Pompa	Singer	Facundo Mazzei	4th/3rd
9	Hernán Piquín	Dancer	Cecilia Figaredo	2nd
9	Anita Martínez	Comedian	"Bicho" Gómez	1st
10	Gladys Florimonte	Comedian	Maximiliano D'Iorio	27th
10	Anita Martínez	Comedian	"Bicho" Gómez	26th
10	Agustina Kämpfer	Journalist	Emanuel González	25th
10	"Negro" Álvarez	Comedian	Melina Greco	24th
10	Marcela Tauro	Journalist	Pier Fritzsche	23rd
10	Luciano Tirri	Marcelo Tinelli's cousin	Noelia Marzol	22nd
10	Alberto Samid	Businessman	Sofía Macaggi	21st
10	Verónica Ojeda	Diego Maradona's ex-wife	Nicolás Scillama	20th
10	Nito Artaza	Politician	Silvina Scheffler	19th
10	Nazarena Vélez	Vedette	Juan Carlos Acosta	18th
10	Florencia de la V	Actress & comedian	Martín Pico	17th
10	Carmen Barbieri	Actress & former vedette	Rodrigo Esmella	16th
10	Fernando Burlando	Lawyer & TV Personality	Bárbara Franco	15th
10	Juana Viale	Actress	Facundo Arrigoni	14th
10	Lizy Tagliani	Hair stylist	Christian Ponce	13th
10	Luciana Salazar	Model	Jorge Moliniers	12th
10	Candela Ruggeri	Model	Facundo Insúa	11th
10	Bárbara Vélez	Actress	Ignacio Pérez Cortés	10th
10	Ergün Demir	Actor	Macarena Rinaldi	9th
10	Celeste Muriega	Vedette & dancer	Joel Ledesma	8th
10	Martín Campilongo	Comedian	Bárbara Reali	7th
10	Freddy Villarreal	Comedian	Soledad Bayona	6th
10	Fernando Dente	Actor & singer	María Lourdes Sánchez	5th
10	Gisela Bernal	Dancer	Nicolás Villalba	4th/3rd
10	Cinthia Fernández	Gymnast & vedette	Gabriel Usandivaras	4th/3rd
10	Ailén Bechara	Model	Fernando Bertona	2nd
10	Federico Bal	Actor & theatral producer	Laura Fernández	1st
11	Barbara Vélez	Model & actress	Maximiliano Buitrago	32nd
11	Alejandro Lerner	Musician, singer & songwriter	Nina Iraolagoitia	31st
11	María Del Mar Cuello Molar	Model	Fernando Bertona	30th
11	Julio Iglesias Jr.	Singer	Julieta Vaccarelli	29th
11	Fabián Doman	Journalist, TV & radio host	Bárbara Reali	28th
11	Evander Holyfield	Boxer	Judith Kovalovsky	27th
11	Pamela Sosa	Vedette	Alejandro Gallego	26th
11	Marta Sánchez	Singer	Joel Ledesma	25th
11	Miriam «Militta» Bora	Singer	Iván Anrriquez	24th
11	Martín Liberman	Sports journalist & TV and radio host	Marcela Greco	23rd
11	Fernando Carrillo	Model & actor	Camila Méndez Ribeiro	22nd
11	Ernestina Pais	TV & radio host	Marcos Beierbach	21st
11	Fer Vázquez	Singer	Estefanía Pais	20th
11	Fernanda Herrera	Lawyer & TV personality	Fernando Bertona	19th
11	Agustín Casanova	Singer & songwriter	Josefina Oriozabala	18th
11	Diego Maradona Jr.	Footballer	Yamila Ramírez	17th
11	Lizy Tagliani	Actress, comedian, TV & radio host & stylist	Carlos Bernal	16th
11	Osvaldo Laport	Actor, theatre director & singer	Macarena Rinaldi	15th
11	Anita Martínez	Comedian & actress	Marcos «Bicho» Gómez	14th
11	Favio Posca	Actor & comedian	Soledad Bayona	13th
11	Oscar Ruggeri	Footballer	Candela Ruggeri	12th
11	Sabrina Rojas	Model & actress	Cristián Ponce	11th
11	Bárbara Vélez	Model & actress	Maximiliano Buitrago	10th
11	Iliana Calabró	Actress	Fernando Castro	9th
11	Carla Conte	TV host	Marcos Beierbach	8th
11	Charlotte Caniggia	Reality show star	Juan Leandro Nimo	7th
11	Ángela Torres	Actress & singer	Facundo Insúa	6th
11	Nicole Neumann	Model	Jorge Moliniers	5th
11	Federico Bal	Son of Carmen Barbieri	Laura Fernández	4th
11	Mery Del Cerro	Actress & model	Nicolás Villalba	3rd
11	Ezequiel «El Polaco» Cwirkaluk	Singer	Bárbara Silenzi	2nd
11	Pedro Alfonso	Actor	Florencia Vigna	1st
