= Pier Fritzsche =

Argentine dancer

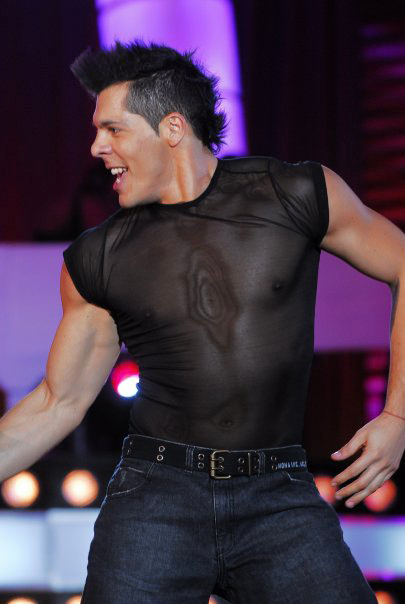
- Born: Oscar Pier Fritzsche; August 21, 1976; Martín Coronado, Buenos Aires, Argentina
- Died: November 27, 2018 (aged 42); Buenos Aires, Argentina
- Occupation(s): Dancer, actor
- Television: Dancing for a dream (Argentina)

Pier Fritzsche (born Oscar Pier Fritzsche; 1976 – November 27, 2018 ) was an Argentine dancer and actor.

== Biography ==
Fritzsche was born in Martín Coronado, Buenos Aires. He became known for his dancing, which he knew how to capture on the Argentine small screen by joining the program Dancing for a dream, from 2008 to 2015. There he accompanied figures such as Karina Jelinek, Silvina Escudero, and Wanda Nara.

He participated in comedy and fiction programs such as No hay dos sin tres, Los Roldán, La noche del Diez, Played for love, Susana Giménez, They are made of iron, Dreaming to dance and You're my man.

He worked in the revue and musical theater genres, appearing in The era of the penguin, Terminestor, Corrientes corner glamor, More than different, Sofovich's magazine, The party is at the lake, The party at Tabarís, Thanks to the Villa and Magnificent .

He gave dance classes and seminars, where he gathered hundreds of students, and every year he danced in the carnivals of Gualeguaychú.

== Death ==
Pier Fritzsche died in Buenos Aires at the age of 42. He had been battling colon cancer for three years.

== Filmography ==
=== TV ===
Year	Title	Role
2008	Bailando por un sueño 2008	Participant
2009	El Musical de tus Sueños	Participant
2010	Bailando por un sueño 2010	Participant
2011	Soñando por Bailar 2011	Participant
2012	Bailando por un sueño 2012	Participant
2015	Bailando por un sueño 2015	Participant
