= Pamela David =

Argentine model (born 1978)

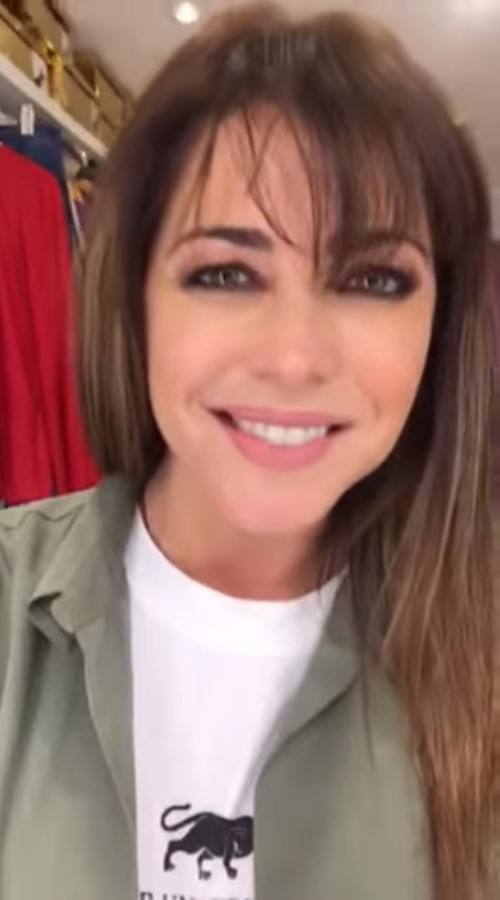
- Pamela David 2017.
- Born: Pamela Carolina David Gutiérrez; 6 October 1978 (age 47); Córdoba, Argentina
- Occupations: Super model, TV presenter, actress
- Years active: 1998–present
- Spouses: Bruno Lábaque; Daniel Villa
- Children: 2

Pamela Carolina David Gutiérrez (born 6 October 1978) Spanish pronunciation: [paˈmela ðaˈβið]) is an Argentinian television personality, presenter, voice actress and model. She found fame in the reality TV show El BarTV 2. She currently works as a co-hostess on América TV's Desayuno Americano.

== Personal life ==
David was born in Córdoba, Argentina, the daughter of DyD owner/producer Alberto David. The family later moved to Santiago del Estero where Pamela entered many beauty contests and won the regional contest for the 'Tourism Queen' contest, later winning the national title to be crowned 'National Queen of Tourism in Argentina'.

== Marriage ==
On 3 March 2008, at the age of 29, David married Bruno Lábaque, a noted basketball player for Club Atenas de Córdoba. The religious ceremony was held in the parish of Villa Allende, while the reception party was in Unquillo, both towns in the province of Córdoba, Argentina. The couple has one son, Felipe., and a daughter, Lola.

== Media career ==
Reality shows
Year	Title	Role	Notes
2001	El Bar TV	Contestant	12th eliminated
2006	Bailando por un Sueño (Argentine TV series) season 1	Contestant	2nd eliminated
2007	Bailando por un Sueño 2007	Candidate	Not chosen
2007	Cantando por un sueño 2007	Contestant	2nd eliminated
2015	Gran Hermano (Argentine TV series) season 8	Host in debate	
2016	Gran Hermano (Argentine TV series) season 9	Host in debate	
2016	El Debate: La Revancha	Host	
