= Bailando por un Sueño (Argentine TV series) season 1 =

Season of television series

Bailando por un Sueño
- Season 1

Release
- Original network: Canal 13
- Original release: April 17 – June 1, 2006

Season chronology
- Next → Season 2

Bailando por un Sueño 1 was the first Argentine season of Bailando por un Sueño.

The first show of the season aired on April 17, 2006, and was part of the original show broadcast by Showmatch on Canal 13 and hosted by Marcelo Tinelli. 8 couples competed during 7 weeks, and the winner was revealed on the season finale, on June 1, 2006. The winner of this first season was the actress, producer and comedian Carmen Barbieri, who was paired with the professional dancer Christian Ponce.

The judges were journalist Jorge Lafauci, professional dancer Laura Fidalgo (who later competed on the show), vedette Zulma Faiad, and producer, actress and singer Reina Reech.

== Couples ==
Celebrity	Notability	Professional Partner	Status
Jorge Martínez	Actor	Nathalia Rodríguez	Eliminated 1st on April 14, 2006
Pamela David	Model	Pablo Giménez	Eliminated 2nd on April 21, 2006
Dalma Maradona	Diego Maradona's daughter	Omar Madeo	Eliminated 3rd on May 5, 2006
Guillermo Novellis	Singer	Lorena Musa	Eliminated 4th on May 14, 2006
Miguel Ángel Cherutti	Actor and comedian	Emilia Almada	Semi-finalists on May 24, 2006
Jessica Cirio	Model	Marcelo Petrín	Semi-finalists on May 26, 2006
Dady Brieva	Comedian	Mirtha Lima	Second place on June 1, 2006
Carmen Barbieri	Actress	Christian Ponce	Winners on June 1, 2006

== Scoring chart ==
Couple	Place	1	2	1+2	3	4	5	6	7	SF	F
Carmen & Christian	1	25	26	51	57	47	51	70	66	4	5
Dady & Mirtha	2	21	25	46	50	62	52	67	65	5	2
Jessica & Marcelo	3	31	28	59	57	58	49	73	68	3	
Miguel & Emilia	4	29	22	51	57	52	55	43	63	2	
Guillermo & Lorena	5	17	24	41	41	48	47		47		
Dalma & Omar	6	31	25	56	52	43			57		
Pamela & Pablo	7	25	33	58	43				60		
Jorge & Nathalia	8	20	23	43					52		

Red numbers indicate the lowest score for each week.
Green numbers indicate the highest score for each week.
indicates the couple eliminated that week.
indicates the couple was saved by the public.
indicates the couple was eliminated but returned into the competition by the judge's decision.
indicates the winning couple.
indicates the runner-up couple.
indicates the semi-finalists couples.

=== Highest and lowest scoring performances ===
The best and worst performances in each dance according to the judges' marks are as follows:

Dance	Best dancer(s)	Best score	Worst dancer(s)	Worst score
Disco	Jessica Cirio; Dalma Maradonna	31	Guillermo Novellis	17
Salsa	Pamela David	33	Miguel Ángel Cherutti	22
Swing	Jessica Cirio	30	Guillermo	19
Cha-cha-cha	Pamela David	31	Guillermo	22
Rock and roll	Dady Brieva; Jesica Cirio	30	Dalma Maradonna; Carmen Barbieri	20
Tango	Dady Brieva	32	Dalma Maradonna	23
Charleston	Miguel Ángel Charutti	30	Jesica Cirio	25
Flamenco	Dady Brieva	26	Guillermo Novellis	23
