= Bailando por un Sueño 2007 =

- Season 2007
- The cast of Bailando por un Sueño 2007

Release
- Original network: Canal 13
- Original release: April 16 – November 6, 2007

Season chronology
- ← Previous; Season 3 Next → Bailando por un Sueño 2008

Bailando por un Sueño 2007 was the fourth Argentine season of Bailando por un Sueño.

The first show of the season aired on April 16, 2007, as part of the original show, Showmatch, broadcast on Canal 13 and hosted by Marcelo Tinelli. This time, there were 32 couples competing, and the competition lasted 30 weeks. The winner was revealed on the season finale, on November 6, 2007: the comedian and model Celina Rucci, who was paired with the professional dancer, Matías Sayago.

The panel of judges had one change: Reina Reech left and was replaced by model, actress and vedette Graciela Alfano. The other judges from the previous season stayed on: Moria Casán, Jorge Lafauci and Gerardo Sofovich.

== Couples ==
Celebrity	Notability	Professional Partner	Status
Silvia Süller	TV personality	Fernando Ragnini	Eliminated 1st by the 45%
Alejandra "Locomotora" Oliveras	Boxer	Enzo Gómez	Eliminated 2nd by the 36%
Flavia Palmiero	Presenter	Exequiel López	Eliminated 3rd by the 39%
Soledad Solaro	Model	Alejandro Váldez	Eliminated 4th by the 38%
Carolina Oltra	Model	Nicolás Tadioli	Eliminated 5th by the 38%
Rodrigo "La Hiena" Barrios	Boxer	–	Withdrew
Paula Morales	Model	Alejandro García	Eliminated 6th by the 41%
Nina Peloso	Political activist	Facundo Mazzei	Eliminated 7th by the 31%
Soledad Fandiño	Model	Lucas Álvarez Márquez	Eliminated 8th by the 48%
Carmen Barbieri	Actress	Leandro Angelo	Eliminated 9th by the 43%
José María Listorti^{[a]}	Comedian	Estefanía Canedi	Eliminated 10th by the 19%
Daniel Agostini	Singer	Virginia Gallardo	Eliminated 11th by the 48%
Victoria Onetto	Actress	Adrián Sánchez	Eliminated 12th by the 45%
Juana Repetto	Reina Reech's daughter	Esteban Hernández	Eliminated 13th by the 32%
Gustavo Guillén	Actor	Abigail Pereira	Eliminated 14th by the 45%
Iliana Calabró	Actress and comedian	Maximiliano D'Iorio	Eliminated 15th by the 47%
Anabel Cherubito	Actress	Lucas Álvarez Márquez	Eliminated 16th by the 35%
Silvia Süller	TV personality	Leandro Angelo	Eliminated 17th by the 47%
Nazarena Velez	Vedette	Facundo de Palo	Eliminated 18th by the 42%
Flavia Palmiero	Presenter	Exequiel López	Eliminated 19th by the 32%
Claudia Fernández	Vedette	Maximiliano D'Iorio	Eliminated 20th by the 49%
Catherine Fulop	Actress and presenter	–	Withdrew
Rocío Guirao Díaz	Model	Nicolás Villalba	Eliminated 21st by the 32%
Matías Alé	TV personality	Gisela Bernal	Eliminated 22nd by the 49.8%
Rocío Marengo	Model	Ivan González Cabrol	Eliminated 23rd by the 41%
María Eugenia Ritó	Vedette	Esteban Hernández	Eliminated 24th by the 37%
Cinthia Fernández^{[b]}	Model	Rodrigo Esmella	Eliminated 25th by the 27%
Carla Conte	Model and presenter	Damián Duarte	Eliminated 26th by the 48%
Liz Solari	Model	Daniel Meza Sánchez	Semi-finalists by the 49.6%
Florencia de la V	Actress and comedian	Martín de la Iglesia	Semi-finalists by the 48%
Paula Robles	Dancer	Franco Tabernero	Runners-up by the 46.72%
Celina Rucci	Model	Matías Sayago	Winners by the 53.28%

- ^[a] Rodrigo "La Hiena" Barrios left the competition, and José María Listorti entered in his place.
- ^[b] Catherine Fulop left the competition, and Cinthia Fernández entered in her place.
- Winners of the re-entry (round 18):
  - Anabel Cherubito (replacing Soledad Fandiño) & Lucas Álvarez Márquez
  - Claudia Fernández (replacing Iliana Calabró) & Maximiliano D'Iorio
  - Flavia Palmiero & Exequiel López
  - María Eugenia Ritó (replacing Juana Repetto) & Esteban Hernández
  - Silvia Süller (replacing Carmen Barbieri) & Leandro Ángelo.

== Scoring chart ==
Celebrity(s)	Place	01	02	03	04	05	06	07	08	09	10	11	12	13	14	15	16	17	18	19	20	21	22	23	24	25	26	27	28	SF	F
Celina	1	29	34	33	30	36	28	60	31	35	32	37	36	67	65	65	59	33	34	37^{[7]}	31	29	34	34	33	72	71	34	73	5	5
Paula R.	2	35	36	30	37	36	34	68	36	37	37	31	37	70	73	67	73	32	32	35	37	35	32	38	37	72	72	37	72	5	2
Florencia	3/4	33	33	32	37	36	34	70	34	31	36	36	35	70	66	70	72	36	32	36	33	33	34	37	33	68	71	37	73	2	
Liz	3/4	28	34	29	36	32	35	69	34	33	33	36	30	66	65	70	66	32	37	36	36	32	34	34	37	69	73	34	73	2	
Carla	5	31	30	30	30	33	28	57	32	37	27	37	30	68	65	66	68	35	29	36	36	33	32	34	33	63	71	36	72		
Cinthia	6																								33	66	70	29			
M. Eugenia	7																		32	33	32	29	33	35	31	69	69				
Rocío M.	8	28	27	34	32	27	31	65	34	34	34	32	36	60	63	66	66	32	32	32	30	35	30	35	30	63					
Matías	9	30	31	35	34	30	36	62	35	32	33^{[3]}	32	33	68	66	71	61	34	36	35	32	33	37	29	31						
Rocío G.	10	33	35	29	37	34	34	67	36	30	36	33	30	65	68	68	66	37	36	37	30	33	34	32							
Catherine	11	28	31	35	35	31	27	63	32	31	36	36	28	64	67	67	66	31	32	33	33	35	31	31							
Claudia	12																		37	36	29	33	32								
Flavia	13	27	30	26															31	36	31	32									
Nazarena	14	33	30	30	37	31	29	65	30	31	32^{[5]}	30	33	65	66	66^{[6]}	62^{[6]}	34	32	34	29										
Silvia	15	14																	31	32											
Anabel	16																		31												
Iliana	17	32	27	31	33	29	29	63	28	37	33	29	37	66	60	67	57														
Gustavo	18	28	31	27	33	36	29	63	28	34	29	31	31	64	69	58															
Juana	19	26	32	35	32	32	30	64	35^{[2]}	32	34	31	31	64	59																
Victoria	20	31	27	34	29	33	33	66	30	37	30	29	32^{[5]}	64																	
Daniel	21	21	28	32	29	29	27	57	27	26	33^{[4]}	32	28																		
José M.	22						29	57	31	31	36	29																			
Carmen	23	24	33	27	31	37	29	59	32	31	30																				
Soledad F.	24	29	27	26	29	33	27	57	35	27																					
Nina	25	34	35	29	29	28	28	61	28																						
Paula M.	26	33	33	28	30	32	31	57																							
Hiena	27	27	31	24	31	27																									
Carolina	28	27	28	32	32	27																									
Soledad S.	29	31	25^{[1]}	28	29																										
Locomotora	30	25	27																												

Red numbers indicate the lowest score for each week.
Green numbers indicate the highest score for each week.
indicates the couple eliminated that week.
indicates the couple was saved by the public.
indicates the couple was saved by the jury.
indicates the couple withdrew.
indicates the winning couple.
indicates the runner-up couple.
indicates the semi-finalists couples.

- In the eleventh duel Nazarena Vélez was replaced by Claudia Fernández.
- In the twenty-third duel Catherine Fulop was replaced by Cinthia Fernández.
- ^[1] replaced by Fernanda Vives.
- ^[2] replaced by Claudia Albertario.
- ^[3] replaced by Marcelo "Teto" Medina.
- ^[4] replaced by Guillermo Novellis.
- ^[5] replaced by Claudia Fernández.
- ^[6] replaced by Jesica Cirio.
- ^[7] replaced by Valeria Archimó.

=== Highest and lowest scoring performances ===
The best and worst performances in each dance according to the judges' marks are as follows:

Dance	Best dancer(s)	Best score	Worst dancer(s)	Worst score
Disco	Paula Robles	35	Silvia Süller	14
Salsa	Paula Robles	36	Soledad Solaro	25
Rock and roll	Matías Alé; Catherine Fulop; Juana Repetto	35	Rodrigo "La Hiena" Barrios	24
Axé music	Paula Robles; Florencia de la V Rocío Guirao Díaz; Nazarena Velez	37	Victoria Onetto; Daniel Agostini; Soledad Fandiño; Nina Peloso; Soledad Solaro	29
Jazz	Carmen Barbieri	37	Carolina Oltra; Rodrigo "La Hiena" Barrios; Rocío Marengo	27
Mambo Pole dance	Florencia de la V	70	Carla Conte; Paula Morales; José María Listorti; Daniel Agostini; Soledad Fandiño	57
Lambada	Paula Robles; Rocío Guirao Díaz	36	Daniel Agostini	27
Hip-hop	Paula Robles; Carla Conte; Iliana Calabró; Victoria Onetto	36	Daniel Agostini	26
Swing	Paula Robles	37	Carla Conte	27
Milonga	Celina Rucci; Carla Conte	37	Iliana Calabró; Victoria Onetto; José María Listorti	29
Strip dance	Iliana Calabró; Paula Robles	37	Daniel Agostini; Catherine Fulop	28
Disco Reggaeton	Paula Robles; Florencia de la V	70	Rocío Marengo	60
Rock and roll Cha-cha-cha	Paula Robles	73	Juana Repetto	59
Axé music Charleston	Matías Alé	71	Gustavo Guillén	58
Hip-hop Argentine cumbia	Paula Robles	73	Iliana Calabró	57
Pole dance	Rocío Guirao Díaz; Claudia Fernández	37	Catherine Fulop	31
Cuarteto	Liz Solari; Claudia Fernández	37	Carla Conte	29
Jive	Rocío Guirao Díaz; Celina Rucci	37	Rocío Marengo; Silvia Süller	32
Merengue	Paula Robles	37	Claudia Fernández; Nazarena Velez	29
Beat music	Paula Robles; Rocío Marengo; Catherine Fulop	35	Celina Rucci; María Eugenia Ritó	29
Arabic music	Matías Alé	37	Rocío Marengo	30
Music video	Paula Robles	38	Matías Alé	29
Latin pop	Paula Robles; Liz Solari	37	Rocío Marengo	30
Rumba Flamenca Cuarteto	Celina Rucci; Paula Robles	72	Rocío Marengo; Carla Conte	63
Music video Argentine cumbia	Liz Solari	73	María Eugenia Ritó	69
Samba	Paula Robles; Florencia de la V	37	Cinthia Fernández	29
Reggaeton Country music	Liz Solari; Celina Rucci; Florencia de la V	73	Carla Conte; Paula Robles	72

== Styles, scores and songs ==
Secret vote is in bold text.

=== April ===
Disco and Salsa
Date	Couple	Style	Song	Score				Total
Date	Couple	Style	Song	Graciela	Jorge	Moria	Gerardo	Total
April 16	Catherine & Rodrigo	Disco	Gloria Gaynor – "I Will Survive"	10	4	**7**	7	28
April 16	Carmen & Leandro	Disco	Sister Sledge – "We Are Family"	8	3	**5**	8	24
April 16	Matías & Gisela	Disco	Kool & the Gang – "Celebration"	10	5	**8**	7	30
April 16	Silvia & Fernando	Disco	Chic – "Le Freak"	6	3	**1**	4	14
April 16	Daniel & Virginia	Disco	Bee Gees – "You Should Be Dancing"	9	2	**4**	6	21
April 16	Nazarena & Facundo	Disco	Alicia Bridges – "I Love the Nightlife"	10	5	**9**	9	33
April 16	Locomotora & Enzo	Disco	Diana Ross – "Upside Down"	9	4	**6**	6	25
April 16	Rocío G. & Nicolás	Disco	Jamiroquai – "Canned Heat"	10	5	**10**	8	33
April 17	Iliana & Maximiliano	Disco	Earth, Wind & Fire – "September"	9	5	**9**	9	32
April 17	Nina & Facundo	Disco	Village People – "YMCA"	10	5	**10**	9	34
April 17	Paula R. & Franco	Disco	Donna Summer – "Last Dance"	10	6	**10**	10	36
April 17	Juana & Esteban	Disco	The Jackson 5 – "Blame It on the Boogie"	8	4	**7**	7	26
April 17	Celina & Matías	Disco	Earth, Wind & Fire – "Boogie Wonderland"	9	4	**7**	9	29
April 19	Florencia & Martín	Disco	Frankie Valli – "Can't Take My Eyes Off You"	9	5	**9**	10	33
April 19	Carolina & Nicolás	Disco	ABBA – "Dancing Queen"	8	4	**8**	7	27
April 19	Hiena & Estefanía	Disco	Kool & the Gang – "Ladies' Night"	8	4	**8**	7	27
April 19	Gustavo & Abigail	Disco	The Gap Band – "Burn Rubber on Me (Why You Wanna Hurt Me)"	8	3	**9**	8	28
April 19	Liz & Daniel	Disco	Scissor Sisters – "I Don't Feel Like Dancin'"	8	3	**9**	8	28
April 19	Soledad F. & Lucas	Disco	KC and the Sunshine Band – "That's the Way (I Like It)"	9	4	**8**	8	29
April 20	Rocío M. & Iván	Disco	Laura Brannigan – "Gloria"	9	4	**7**	8	28
April 20	Carla & Damián	Disco	Kym Mazelle – "Young Hearts Run Free"	9	5	**8**	9	31
April 20	Victoria & Adrián	Disco	Donna Summer – "On the Radio"	9	5	**9**	8	31
April 20	Soledad S. & Alejandro	Disco	Michael Jackson – "Don't Stop 'til You Get Enough"	9	5	**9**	8	31
April 20	Flavia & Exequiel	Disco	Cher – "Strong Enough"	8	4	**8**	7	27
April 20	Paula M. & Alejandro	Disco	Patrick Hernandez – "Born to Be Alive"	9	5	**10**	9	33
April 24	Catherine & Rodrigo	Salsa	José Alberto "El Canario" – "Llegó el Sabor"	**10**	5	8	10	33
April 24	Carmen & Leandro	Salsa	Charlie Cruz – "La Candela"	**9**	6	9	9	33
April 24	Matías & Gisela	Salsa	La Salsa – "Viva Mexico"	**9**	5	9	8	31
April 24	Nazarena & Facundo	Salsa	Frankie Negrón – "No Me Compares"	**9**	5	7	9	30
April 24	Paula R. & Franco	Salsa	Gilberto Santa Rosa – "Déjate Querer"	**10**	7	10	9	36
April 24	Locomotora & Enzo	Salsa	Gilberto Santa Rosa – "La Agarro Bajando"	**7**	5	8	7	27
April 24	Rocío G. & Nicolás	Salsa	Gloria Estefan – "Mi Tierra"	**7**	5	8	7	27
April 24	Iliana & Maximiliano	Salsa	Celia Cruz – "Sazón"	**8**	4	7	8	27
April 26	Juana & Esteban	Salsa	Charanga Habanera – "Por Amarte Así"	**9**	5	9	9	32
April 26	Nina & Facundo	Salsa	Celia Cruz – "Obladi Oblada"	**9**	6	10	10	35
April 26	Celina & Matías	Salsa	Charlie Cruz – "Bombón de Azúcar"	**9**	6	9	10	34
April 26	Florencia & Martín	Salsa		**10**	5	7	10	32
April 26	Hiena & Estefanía	Salsa	José Alberto "El Canario" – "A la Hora que Me llamen Voy"	**9**	5	9	8	31
April 26	Gustavo & Abigail	Salsa	Gloria Estefan – "Hoy"	**8**	5	9	9	31
April 26	Liz & Daniel	Salsa	Dark Latin Groove – "Acuyuyé"	**9**	5	10	10	34
April 26	Soledad F. & Lucas	Salsa	Dark Latin Groove – "Atrévete (No Puedes Conmigo)"	**8**	4	7	8	27
April 27	Rocío M. & Iván	Salsa	Chichi Peralta – "Procura"	**8**	4	7	8	27
April 27	Carla & Damián	Salsa	George Lamond – "Si Te Vas"	**8**	5	8	9	30
April 27	Victoria & Adrían	Salsa	Mano Negra – "Mala Vida"	**9**	4	7	7	27
April 27	Soledad S. & Alejandro	Salsa	Marc Anthony – "Valió la Pena"	**7**	4	7	7	25
April 27	Flavia & Exequiel	Salsa	Celia Cruz and Gloria Estefan – "Tres Gotas De Agua Bendita"	**8**	5	9	8	30
April 27	Paula M. & Alejandro	Salsa	Polo Montañez – "Un montón de estrellas"	**8**	6	10	9	33
April 27	Daniel & Virginia	Salsa	Sexappeal – "La Llorona"	**7**	5	8	8	28
April 27	Carolina & Nicolás	Salsa	Marc Anthony – "Vvir lo nuestro"	**7**	5	8	8	28

=== May ===
Rock and roll, Axé music, Jazz, Mambo and Pole dance
Date	Couple	Style	Song	Score				Total
Date	Couple	Style	Song	Graciela	Jorge	Moria	Gerardo	Total
May 1	Liz & Daniel	Rock and roll	The Beatles – "Can't Buy Me Love"	8	**5**	8	8	29
May 1	Paula M. & Alejandro	Rock and roll	Stray Cats – "(She's) Sexy + 17"	8	**4**	8	8	28
May 1	Nazarena & Facundo	Rock and roll	Elvis Presley – "Hard Headed Woman	9	**4**	8	9	30
May 1	Daniel & Virginia	Rock and roll	Creedence Clearwater Revival – "Proud Mary"	8	**5**	9	10	32
May 1	Rocío M. & Iván	Rock and roll	Chuck Berry – "Johnny B. Goode"	8	**6**	10	10	34
May 1	Paula R. & Franco	Rock and roll	Elvis Presley – "All Shook Up"	10	**5**	8	7	30
May 1	Celina & Matías	Rock and roll	Creedence Clearwater Revival – "Travelin' Band"	10	**5**	9	9	33
May 3	Florencia & Martín	Rock and roll	John Travolta – "Greased Lightnin"	8	**6**	8	10	32
May 3	Carmen & Leandro	Rock and roll	Chubby Checker – "Let's Twist Again"	8	**5**	7	7	27
May 3	Flavia & Exequiel	Rock and roll	Bill Haley & His Comets – "Rock Around the Clock"	8	**4**	7	7	26
May 3	Gustavo & Abigail	Rock and roll	Bill Haley & His Comets – "See You Later, Alligator"	7	**3**	9	8	27
May 3	Iliana & Maximiliano	Rock and roll	Elvis Presley – "Hound Dog"	8	**5**	9	9	31
May 3	Nina & Facundo	Rock and roll	Little Richard – "Tutti Frutti"	8	**4**	8	9	29
May 3	Catherine & Rodrigo	Rock and roll	Elvis Presley – "Jailhouse Rock"	10	**5**	10	10	35
May 3	Hiena & Estefanía	Rock and roll	Little Richard – "Good Golly Miss Molly"	7	**3**	7	7	24
May 4	Victoria & Adrián	Rock and roll	Little Richard – "Long Tall Sally"	10	**5**	9	10	34
May 4	Rocío G. & Nicolás	Rock and roll	Danny & the Juniors – "Rock And Roll Is Here To Stay"	9	**4**	8	8	29
May 4	Carolina & Nicolás	Rock and roll	Chuck Berry – "Rock and Roll Music"	10	**5**	9	8	32
May 4	Fernanda & Alejandro	Rock and roll	Queen – "Crazy Little Thing Called Love"	8	**4**	8	8	28
May 4	Carla & Damián	Rock and roll	Elvis Presley – "Blue Suede Shoes"	9	**5**	8	8	30
May 4	Matías & Gisela	Rock and roll	Jerry Lee Lewis – "Great Balls of Fire"	10	**6**	10	9	35
May 4	Juana & Esteban	Rock and roll	Kenny Loggins – "Footloose"	10	**6**	10	9	35
May 4	Soledad F. & Lucas	Rock and roll	Elvis Presley – "Let's Have a Party"	8	**3**	7	8	26
May 8	Florencia & Martín	Axé music	Tchakabum – "Dança da Mãozinha"	10	7	**10**	10	37
May 8	Victoria & Adrián	Axé music	É o Tchan! – "Quebradeira (Joelhinho, Cabeça)"	8	4	**8**	9	29
May 8	Nina & Facundo	Axé music	Tchakabum – "Tesouro de Pirata"	9	4	**8**	8	29
May 8	Carla & Damián	Axé music	Gang do Samba – "Cada Macaco no Seu Galho"	9	5	**8**	8	30
May 8	Daniel & Virginia	Axé music	Asa de Águia – "Dança da Manivela"	8	5	**8**	8	29
May 8	Rocío G. & Nicolás	Axé music	É o Tchan! – "Dança do Bumbum"	10	7	**10**	10	37
May 8	Iliana & Maximiliano	Axé music	Ta Demais – "Festa Bahiana"	9	6	**9**	9	33
May 10	Carmen & Leandro	Axé music	Terra Samba – "Revoleio"	9	6	**8**	8	31
May 10	Matías & Gisela	Axé music	Companhia do Pagode – "Dança do Canguru"	10	6	**9**	9	34
May 10	Rocío M. & Iván	Axé music		9	5	**9**	9	32
May 10	Paula R. & Franco	Axé music	Terra Samba – "Treme Terra"	10	7	**10**	10	37
May 10	Gustavo & Abigail	Axé music	É o Tchan! – "Segure o Tchan"	10	5	**9**	9	33
May 10	Carolina & Nicolás	Axé music		9	5	**9**	9	32
May 10	Soledad F. & Lucas	Axé music	É o Tchan! – "Tchan na Selva"	8	4	**8**	9	29
May 10	Soledad S. & Alejandro	Axé music		9	5	**7**	8	29
May 11	Catherine & Rodrigo	Axé music	Patrulha do Samba – "Swing de Rua"	9	6	**10**	10	35
May 11	Hiena & Estefanía	Axé music	Carrapicho – "Tic, Tic Tac"	10	5	**8**	8	31
May 11	Paula M. & Alejandro	Axé music	Terra Samba – "Chiqui Chiqui Bom"	9	5	**8**	8	30
May 11	Nazarena & Facundo	Axé music	É o Tchan! – "Na Boquinha da Garrafa"	10	7	**10**	10	37
May 11	Celina & Matías	Axé music	Banda Cheiro de Amor – "A Danca da Sensual"	9	4	**8**	9	30
May 11	Juana & Esteban	Axé music	É o Tchan! – "Gol de Placa"	9	5	**9**	9	32
May 11	Liz & Daniel	Axé music	Asa de Águia – "Dança do Vampiro"	10	6	**10**	10	36
May 14	Rocío M. & Iván	Jazz	Frank Sinatra – "Strangers in the Night"	8	**4**	7	8	27
May 14	Iliana & Maximiliano	Jazz	Robbie Williams – "Ain't That a Kick in the Head?"	8	**5**	8	8	29
May 14	Rocío G. & Nicolás	Jazz	Connie Francis – "Lara's Theme"	9	**5**	10	10	34
May 15	Florencia & Martín	Jazz	Paloma San Basilio – "Hot Jazz"	10	**7**	9	10	36
May 15	Gustavo & Abigail	Jazz	Frank Sinatra and Liza Minnelli – "I've Got the World on a String"	10	**7**	10	10	37
May 15	Juana & Esteban	Jazz	Robbie Williams – "Beyond the Sea"	9	**6**	9	8	32
May 15	Paula M. & Alejandro	Jazz	Frank Sinatra and Shirley Bassey – "The Lady Is a Tramp"	9	**5**	9	9	32
May 15	Hiena & Estefanía	Jazz	Frank Sinatra – "Tender Trap"	7	**5**	8	7	27
May 15	Nina & Facundo	Jazz	Frank Sinatra – "I Believe"	9	**5**	7	7	28
May 15	Carolina & Nicolás	Jazz	Frank Sinatra – "I Get a Kick out of You"	8	**4**	7	8	27
May 17	Catherine & Rodrigo	Jazz	Frank Sinatra – "I've Got You Under My Skin"	9	**5**	9	8	31
May 17	Paula R. & Franco	Jazz	Robbie Williams – "Mack the Knife"	10	**7**	9	10	36
May 17	Liz & Daniel	Jazz	George Michael – "Secret Love"	10	**5**	8	9	32
May 17	Carla & Damián	Jazz	Frank Sinatra – "Let's Face the Music and Dance"	9	**6**	9	9	33
May 17	Soledad F. & Lucas	Jazz	Robbie Williams – "Have You Met Miss Jones?"	8	**6**	9	10	33
May 17	Daniel & Virginia	Jazz	Frank Sinatra – "You Make Me Feel So Young"	8	**5**	8	8	29
May 18	Carmen & Lucas	Jazz		10	**7**	10	10	37
May 18	Nina & Facundo	Jazz		9	**5**	7	7	28
May 18	Victoria & Adrián	Jazz		10	**6**	9	8	33
May 18	Celina & Matías	Jazz		10	**6**	10	10	36
May 18	Matías & Gisela	Jazz		8	**5**	8	9	30
May 22	Florencia & Martín	Mambo		**10**	5	9	10	34
May 22	Carla & Damián	Mambo	Tito Puente – "Babarabatiri"	**8**	4	8	8	28
May 22	Juana & Esteban	Mambo		**9**	4	9	8	30
May 22	Nazarena & Facundo	Mambo	Perez Prado – "Mambo Paris"	**8**	4	8	9	29
May 22	Paula M. & Alejandro	Mambo		**9**	5	9	8	31
May 22	Victoria & Adrián	Mambo		**9**	6	9	9	33
May 24	José M. & Estefanía	Mambo		**8**	4	10	7	29
May 24	Catherina & Rodrigo	Mambo		**8**	4	7	8	27
May 24	Daniel & Virginia	Mambo		**8**	3	8	8	27
May 24	Paula R. & Franco	Mambo		**10**	5	10	9	34
May 24	Liz & Daniel	Mambo	Tito Puente – "Ran Kan Kan"	**10**	5	10	10	35
May 24	Rocío M. & Iván	Mambo	Perez Prado – "Mambo 8"	**8**	5	9	9	31
May 24	Soledad F. & Lucas	Mambo		**8**	3	8	8	27
May 25	Rocío G. & Nicolás	Mambo		**9**	5	10	10	34
May 25	Matías & Gisela	Mambo	Lou Bega – "Mambo No. 5"	**10**	6	10	10	36
May 25	Carmen & Leandro	Mambo		**9**	5	8	7	29
May 25	Iliana & Maximiliano	Mambo	Perez Prado – "La Niña Popof"	**9**	4	8	8	29
May 25	Gustavo & Abigail	Mambo	Tito Rodríguez – "Claves for Mambo"	**8**	3	9	9	29
May 25	Nina & Facundo	Mambo		**8**	3	9	8	28
May 25	Celina & Matías	Mambo		**8**	4	8	8	28
May 28	Rocío G. & Nicolás	Pole dance	Lenny Kravitz – "American Woman"	**9**	4	10	10	33
May 28	Gustavo & Abigail	Pole dance	Arrows – "I Love Rock 'n' Roll"	**10**	5	10	9	34
May 28	Paula M. & Alejandro	Pole dance	Michael Bublé – "Feeling Good"	**8**	3	8	7	26
May 28	Matías & Gisela	Pole dance	Britney Spears – "(I Can't Get No) Satisfaction"	**9**	3	7	7	26
May 29	Celina & Matías	Pole dance	Justin Timberlake – "Sexy Ladies"	**9**	5	9	9	32
May 29	Iliana & Maximiliano	Pole dance	AC/DC – "Back in Black"	**9**	5	10	10	34
May 29	José M. & Estefanía	Pole dance	Christina Aguilera – "Ain't No Other Man"	**9**	4	7	8	28
May 29	Nazarena & Facundo	Pole dance	Kylie Minogue – "Chocolate"	**10**	6	10	10	36
May 29	Liz & Daniel	Pole dance	Will Smith – "Black Suits Comin' (Nod Ya Head)"	**10**	5	10	9	34
May 31	Daniel & Virginia	Pole dance	AC/DC – "Highway to Hell"	**8**	4	9	9	30
May 31	Rocio M. & Iván	Pole dance	Christina Aguilera – "Fighter"	**9**	5	10	10	34
May 31	Nina & Facundo	Pole dance	Five – "Everybody Get Up"	**10**	6	10	7	33
May 31	Florencia & Martín	Pole dance	Christina Aguilera featuring Redman – "Dirrty"	**10**	6	10	10	36
May 31	Paula R. & Franco	Pole dance	Moloko – "Fun for Me"	**10**	5	9	10	34
May 31	Carla & Damián	Pole dance	Marilyn Manson – "This Is the New Shit"	**9**	4	8	8	29

=== June ===
Pole dance, Lambada, Hip-hop, Swing and Milonga
Date	Couple	Style	Song	Score				Total
Date	Couple	Style	Song	Graciela	Jorge	Moria	Gerardo	Total
June 1	Soledad F. & Lucas	Pole dance	Madonna – "Don't Tell Me"	**8**	4	8	9	29
June 1	Victoria & Adrián	Pole dance	Booker T. Laury – "Big Legged Woman"	**9**	6	9	9	33
June 1	Carmen & Leandro	Pole dance	Marilyn Monroe – "I Wanna Be Loved by You"	**9**	5	8	8	30
June 1	Juana & Esteban	Pole dance	Britney Spears – "...Baby One More Time"	**10**	6	9	9	34
June 1	Catherine & Rodrigo	Pole dance	Christina Aguilera, Pink, Lil' Kim and Mýa – "Lady Marmalade"	**10**	7	10	9	36
June 5	Paula R. & Franco	Lambada	Kaoma – "Chorando Se Foi"	10	7	**10**	9	36
June 5	Rocío G. & Nicolás	Lambada	Kaoma – "Jambé Finète (Grille)"	10	6	**10**	10	36
June 5	Carla & Damián	Lambada	Beto Barbosa – "Mar de Emoções (Bambolê)"	9	5	**9**	9	32
June 5	Soledad F. & Lucas	Lambada	Francky Vincent – "Fruit de la Passion"	10	5	**10**	10	35
June 5	Gustavo & Abigail	Lambada	Kaoma – "Lambamor"	8	4	**8**	8	28
June 5	Nina & Facundo	Lambada		8	4	**8**	8	28
June 5	Iliana & Maximiliano	Lambada	Quatro – "Passa Sabe"	8	4	**8**	8	28
June 7	Daniel & Virginia	Lambada		8	4	**7**	8	27
June 7	Nazarena & Facundo	Lambada	Kaoma – "Mélodie d'Amour"	9	4	**8**	9	30
June 7	Celina & Matías	Lambada	Kaoma – "Dança Tago Mago"	9	5	**9**	8	31
June 7	Victoria & Adrián	Lambada	Lewis Gordon Smit – "Soca Dance"	8	5	**9**	8	30
June 7	José M. & Estefanía	Lambada		10	4	**8**	9	31
June 7	Catherine & Rodrigo	Lambada	Kaoma – "Bantù"	9	5	**9**	9	32
June 8	Carmen & Leandro	Lambada	Arrow – "Groove Master"	9	5	**9**	9	32
June 8	Rocío M. & Iván	Lambada	Beto Barbosa – "Louca Magia"	9	6	**10**	9	34
June 8	Florencia & Martín	Lambada	Kaoma – "Dançando Lambada"	10	6	**9**	9	34
June 8	Liz & Daniel	Lambada	Ivete Sangalo – "A Galera"	9	6	**9**	10	34
June 8	Juana & Esteban	Lambada		9	6	**10**	10	35
June 8	Matías & Gisela	Lambada	Kaoma – "Dança Tago Mago"	10	6	**10**	9	35
June 12	Rocío M. & Iván	Hip-hop	The Black Eyed Peas – "My Humps"	10	**5**	9	10	34
June 12	Rocío G. & Nicolás	Hip-hop	Britney Spears – "Do Somethin'"	9	**4**	8	9	30
June 12	Celina & Matías	Hip-hop	The Black Eyed Peas – "Pump It"	10	**6**	10	9	35
June 12	Juana & Esteban	Hip-hop	Gwen Stefani – "Hollaback Girl"	9	**5**	9	9	32
June 12	Catherine & Rodrigo	Hip-hop	The Black Eyed Peas – "Let's Get It Started"	9	**5**	8	9	31
June 12	Gustavo & Abigail	Hip-hop	'N Sync – "Pop"	8	**6**	10	10	34
June 14	Paula R. & Franco	Hip-hop	Beyoncé featuring Sean Paul – "Baby Boy"	8	**6**	10	10	34
June 14	Soledad F. & Lucas	Hip-hop	Britney Spears – "Overprotected"	8	**4**	7	8	27
June 14	Florencia & Martín	Hip-hop	Pink – "Get the Party Started"	9	**5**	8	9	31
June 14	Daniel & Virginia	Hip-hop	Robbie Williams – "Rudebox"	8	**4**	7	7	27
June 14	Liz & Daniel	Hip-hop	Pussycat Dolls – "Don't Cha"	10	**5**	8	10	33
June 14	Carmen & Leandro	Hip-hop	Beyoncé featuring Jay-Z – "Crazy in Love"	8	**5**	9	9	31
June 15	Matías & Gisela	Hip-hop	Backstreet Boys – "Get Another Boyfriend"	10	**6**	9	7	32
June 15	Nazarena & Facundo	Hip-hop	Beyoncé featuring Jay-Z – "Déjà Vu"	8	**6**	9	8	31
June 15	Carla & Damián	Hip-hop	The Cheetah Girls – "The Party's Just Begun"	10	**7**	10	10	37
June 15	José M. & Estefanía	Hip-hop	Usher featuring Lil Jon and Ludacris – "Yeah!"	9	**5**	8	9	31
June 15	Victoria & Adrián	Hip-hop	Gwen Stefani – "Wind It Up"	10	**7**	10	10	37
June 15	Iliana & Maximiliano	Hip-hop	No Doubt – "Hey Baby"	10	**7**	10	10	37
June 19	Florencia & Martín	Swing	Christina Aguilera – "Candyman"	10	7	10	**9**	36
June 19	Rocío M. & Iván	Swing		9	5	10	**10**	34
June 19	Rocío G. & Nicolás	Swing		10	6	10	**10**	36
June 19	Celina & Matías	Swing	Glenn Miller – "In the Mood"	10	6	10	**10**	36
June 19	Juana & Esteban	Swing		9	6	10	**9**	34
June 19	Catherine & Rodrigo	Swing		10	6	10	**10**	36
June 21	Gustavo & Abigail	Swing		9	4	8	**8**	29
June 21	Paula R. & Franco	Swing		10	7	10	**10**	37
June 21	Guillermo & Virginia	Swing	The Andrews Sisters – "Bounce Me Brother (With a Solid Four)"	9	5	10	**9**	33
June 21	Liz & Daniel	Swing	Duke Ellington – "If Don't Mean a Thing"	9	5	9	**10**	33
June 21	Carmen & Leonardo	Swing		9	4	8	**9**	30
June 22	Teto & Gisela	Swing		10	5	10	**8**	33
June 22	Nazarena & Facundo	Swing		9	5	9	**8**	31
June 22	Carla & Damián	Swing	Brian Setzer Orchestra – "Jump Jive an' Wail"	8	4	7	**8**	27
June 22	José M. & Estefanía	Swing	Los Pettinellis – "Tu Vuo Fal'Americano"	10	6	10	**10**	36
June 22	Victoria & Adrián	Swing		8	4	9	**9**	30
June 22	Iliana & Maximiliano	Swing		9	5	10	**9**	33
June 26	Celina & Matías	Milonga	Francisco Canaro – "La Orillera"	10	7	**10**	10	37
June 26	Florencia & Martin	Milonga		9	7	**10**	10	36
June 26	Liz & Daniel	Milonga	Astor Piazzolla – "A Fuego Lento"	9	7	**10**	10	36
June 26	Rocío G. & Nicolás	Milonga		10	5	**9**	9	33
June 26	Matías & Gisela	Milonga		10	5	**8**	9	32
June 28	Paula R. & Franco	Milonga		10	5	**8**	8	31
June 28	Rocío M. & Iván	Milonga	Mariano Mores – "Taquito Militar"	9	4	**9**	10	32
June 28	Iliana & Maximiliano	Milonga	Tita Merelo – "Se Dice de Mi"	8	4	**8**	9	29
June 28	José M. & Estefanía	Milonga	Julio Sosa – "Azúcar, Pimienta y Sal"	10	4	**8**	7	29
June 28	Carla & Damián	Milonga	Alfredo de Angelis – "Corralera"	10	7	**10**	10	37
June 28	Victoria & Adrián	Milonga	Alberto Gomez – "Milonga Que Peina Canas"	9	4	**8**	8	29
June 29	Nazarena & Facundo	Milonga		8	4	**9**	9	30
June 29	Catherine & Rodrigo	Milonga		10	7	**9**	10	36
June 29	Daniel & Virginia	Milonga		9	5	**9**	9	32
June 29	Juana & Esteban	Milonga		8	5	**9**	9	31
June 29	Gustavo & Abigail	Milonga		8	5	**9**	9	31

=== July ===
Strip dance, Reggaeton, Disco, Cha-cha-cha, Rock and roll and Axé
Date	Couple	Style	Song	Score				Total
Date	Couple	Style	Song	Graciela	Jorge	Moria	Gerardo	Total
July 3	Rocío G. & Nicolás	Strip dance	Aerosmith – "Cryin'"	8	**9**	9	9	35
July 3	Catherine & Rodrigo	Strip dance	Milva – "L'Ultima Carmen"	8	**4**	8	8	28
July 3	Gustavo & Abigail	Strip dance	Prince – "Cream"	9	**5**	9	8	31
July 3	Rocío M. & Iván	Strip dance	Lenny Kravitz – "Fly"	10	**6**	10	10	36
July 3	Nazarena & Facundo	Strip dance	Joe Cocker – "You Can Leave Your Hat On"	9	**5**	9	10	33
July 5	Daniel & Virginia	Strip dance	Beyoncé and Shakira – "Beautiful Liar"	9	**4**	8	7	28
July 5	Carla & Damián	Strip dance	Alicia Keys – "Fallin'"	8	**5**	9	8	30
July 5	Paula R. & Franco	Strip dance	Melinda Doolittle – "I'm a Woman"	10	**7**	10	10	37
July 5	Liz & Daniel	Strip dance	Aerosmith – "Rag Doll"	8	**4**	9	9	30
July 5	Florencia & Martín	Strip dance	Bajofondo Tango Club – "Monserrat"	9	**6**	10	10	35
July 6	Celina & Matías	Strip dance	Harlem Hamfats – "Why Don't You Do Right?"	10	**6**	10	10	36
July 6	Matías & Gisela	Strip dance	Pussycat Dolls – "Buttons"	10	**5**	9	9	33
July 6	Juana & Esteban	Strip dance	Nickie, Helene and The Company – "Big Spender"	8	**4**	10	9	34
July 6	Iliana & Maximiliano	Strip dance	Rage Against the Machine – "Wake Up"	10	**7**	10	10	37
July 6	Claudia & Adrián	Strip dance	Teressa Liane – "Trouble"	7	**5**	10	10	32
July 10	Carla & Damián	Reggaeton	Daddy Yankee – "Lo Que Pasó, Pasó"	10	5	9	**10**	34
July 10	Gustavo & Abigail	Reggaeton	Daddy Yankee – "Gasolina"	9	4	9	**9**	32
July 10	Rocío M. & Iván	Reggaeton	Don Omar – "Entre Tú y Yo"	10	5	9	**10**	34
July 10	Nazarena & Facundo	Reggaeton	Shakira featuring Alejandro Sanz – "La Tortura"	9	4	10	**9**	33
July 10	Juana & Esteban	Reggaeton	Ricky Martin – "Qué Más Da"	10	5	9	**10**	34
July 12	Florencia & Martín	Reggaeton	Don Omar – "Dile"	10	6	10	**10**	36
July 12	Catherine & Rodrigo	Reggaeton	Don Omar – "La Batidora"	8	5	8	**8**	29
July 12	Iliana & Maximiliano	Reggaeton	Daddy Yankee – "Segurosky"	9	5	9	**9**	32
July 12	Victoria & Adrián	Reggaeton	Daddy Yankee – "El Muro"	8	5	8	**8**	29
July 13	Rocío G. & Nicolás	Reggaeton	Wisin & Yandel – "Rakata"	10	6	10	**10**	36
July 13	Celina & Matías	Reggaeton	Héctor & Tito – "Baila Morena"	10	6	9	**10**	35
July 13	Paula R. & Franco	Reggaeton	Daddy Yankee – "Dale Caliente"	10	7	10	**10**	37
July 13	Liz & Daniel	Reggaeton	Daddy Yankee – "King Daddy"	10	6	10	**10**	36
July 13	Matías & Gisela	Reggaeton	Ricky Martin featuring Daddy Yankee – "Drop It on Me"	9	5	9	**9**	32
July 16	Catherine & Rodrigo	Disco	Gloria Gaynor – "I Will Survive"	10	4	7	**8**	29
July 16	Matías & Gisela	Disco	Kool & the Gang – "Celebration"	10	6	10	**10**	36
July 16	Nazarena & Facundo	Disco	Alicia Bridges – "I Love the Nightlife"	9	5	9	**9**	32
July 16	Rocío G. & Nicolás	Disco	Jamiroquai – "Canned Heat"	8	4	8	**8**	28
July 16	Iliana & Maximiliano	Disco	Earth, Wind & Fire – "September"	10	5	10	**10**	35
July 17	Paula R. & Franco	Disco	Donna Summer – "Last Dance"	9	6	9	**9**	33
July 17	Juana & Esteban	Disco	The Jackson 5 – "Blame It on the Boogie"	8	5	8	**8**	29
July 17	Celina & Matías	Disco	Earth, Wind & Fire – "Boogie Wonderland"	9	5	9	**9**	32
July 17	Florencia & Martín	Disco	Frankie Valli – "Can't Take My Eyes Off You"	9	5	10	**10**	34
July 19	Gustavo & Abigail	Disco	The Gap Band – "Burn Rubber on Me (Why You Wanna Hurt Me)"	9	4	9	**9**	31
July 19	Liz & Daniel	Disco	Scissor Sisters – "I Don't Feel Like Dancin'"	9	4	9	**8**	30
July 19	Rocío M. & Iván	Disco	Laura Brannigan – "Gloria"	8	4	7	**8**	27
July 19	Carla & Damián	Disco	Kym Mazelle – "Young Hearts Run Free"	9	6	9	**9**	33
July 19	Victoria & Adrián	Disco	Donna Summer – "On the Radio"	8	5	8	**8**	29
July 23	Catherine & Rodrigo	Cha-cha-cha	Celia Cruz – "Ríe y Llora"	10	6	**9**	9	34
July 23	Liz & Daniel	Cha-cha-cha	Ricky Martin – "Amor"	10	5	**9**	9	33
July 23	Nazarena & Facundo	Cha-cha-cha	Santana featuring Maná – "Corazón Espinado"	9	5	**9**	9	32
July 23	Carla & Damián	Cha-cha-cha	Rey Ruiz – "Ay Mujer!"	9	4	**8**	8	29
July 23	Celina & Matías	Cha-cha-cha	Thalía – "Echa Pa' Lante"	9	5	**8**	8	30
July 23	Paula R. & Franco	Cha-cha-cha	Christina Aguilera – "Falsas Esperanzas"	10	8	**10**	10	38
July 23	Rocío G. & Nicolás	Cha-cha-cha	Son by Four – "Sofía"	9	5	**9**	9	32
July 24	Florencia & Martín	Cha-cha-cha	Pussycat Dolls – "Sway"	10	6	**10**	9	35
July 24	Matías & Gisela	Cha-cha-cha	Marc Anthony – "Dímelo"	9	7	**10**	10	36
July 24	Iliana & Maximiliano	Cha-cha-cha	Rey Ruiz – "Muévelo"	9	5	**9**	9	32
July 24	Gustavo & Abigail	Cha-cha-cha	Rubén Rada – "Aparte de Ti, Tú Boca"	10	6	**10**	9	35
July 24	Juana & Esteban	Cha-cha-cha	Marc Anthony – "Dímelo"	9	5	**8**	8	30
July 24	Rocío M. & Iván	Cha-cha-cha	Mimí Maura – "Yo No Lloro Mas"	9	4	**8**	9	30
July 26	Catherine & Rodrigo	Rock and roll	Elvis Presley – "Jailhouse Rock"	10	5	**9**	9	33
July 26	Liz & Daniel	Rock and roll	The Beatles – "Can't Buy Me Love"	9	5	**9**	9	32
July 26	Nazarena & Facundo	Rock and roll	Elvis Presley – "Hard Headed Woman	9	5	**10**	10	34
July 26	Carla & Damián	Rock and roll	Elvis Presley – "Blue Suede Shoes"	10	6	**10**	10	36
July 26	Celina & Matías	Rock and roll	Creedence Clearwater Revival – "Travelin' Band"	10	6	**10**	9	35
July 26	Paula R. & Franco	Rock and roll	Elvis Presley – "All Shook Up"	10	6	**9**	10	35
July 26	Rocío G. & Nicolás	Rock and roll	Danny & the Juniors – "Rock And Roll Is Here To Stay"	10	6	**10**	10	36
July 27	Florencia & Martín	Rock and roll	John Travolta – "Greased Lightnin"	9	5	**9**	8	31
July 27	Matías & Gisela	Rock and roll	Jerry Lee Lewis – "Great Balls of Fire"	9	5	**8**	8	30
July 27	Iliana & Maximiliano	Rock and roll	Elvis Presley – "Hound Dog"	8	4	**8**	8	28
July 27	Gustavo & Abigail	Rock and roll	Bill Haley & His Comets – "See You Later, Alligator"	9	5	**10**	10	34
July 27	Juana & Esteban	Rock and roll	Kenny Loggins – "Footloose"	9	4	**8**	8	29
July 27	Rocío M. & Iván	Rock and roll	Chuck Berry – "Johnny B. Goode"	9	6	**9**	9	33
July 31	Catherine & Rodrigo	Axé	Patrulha do Samba – "Swing de Rua"	8	5	8	**9**	30
July 31	Matías & Gisela	Axé	Companhia do Pagode – "Dança do Canguru"	10	6	9	**9**	34
July 31	Carla & Damián	Axé	Gang do Samba – "Cada macaco No Seu Galho"	10	5	9	**9**	33
July 31	Florencia & Martín	Axé	Tchakabum – "Dança da Maoçinha"	9	7	10	**9**	33
July 31	Gustavo & Abigail	Axé	É o Tchan! – "Segure o Tchan"	9	4	8	**8**	29
July 31	Paula R. & Franco	Axé	Terra Samba – "Treme Terra"	9	5	9	**8**	31
July 31	Celina & Matías	Axé	É o Tchan! – "Segura o Tchan"	10	7	10	**10**	37
July 31	Liz & Daniel	Axé	Asa de Águia – "Dança do Vampiro"	10	5	9	**9**	33
July 31	Rocío G. & Nicolás	Axé	É o Tchan! – "Dança do Bumbum"	9	6	9	**9**	33
July 31	Rocío M. & Iván	Axé	Gang do Samba – "Cada Macaco No Seu Galho"	9	5	10	**10**	34
July 31	Iliana & Maximiliano	Axé	Ta Demais – "Festa Bahiana"	9	5	10	**10**	34
July 31	Jesica & Facundo	Axé	É o Tchan! – "Na Boquinha da Garrafa"	9	5	10	**9**	33

=== August ===
Charleston, Hip-hop, Cumbia, Pole dance, Cuarteto, Jive and Merengue
Date	Couple	Style	Song	Score				Total
Date	Couple	Style	Song	Graciela	Jorge	Moria	Gerardo	Total
August 2	Rocío M. & Iván	Charleston	Cole Porter Orchestra – "Prelude"	9	5	10	**9**	33
August 2	Paula R. & Franco	Charleston	Chicago – "The Honey Honey Rag"	10	6	10	**10**	36
August 2	Celina & Matías	Charleston		8	4	8	**8**	28
August 2	Florencia & Martín	Charleston	Chicago – "All That Jazz"	9	5	10	**10**	34
August 2	Catherine & Rodrigo	Charleston		10	7	10	**10**	37
August 2	Iliana & Maximiliano	Charleston		9	6	9	**9**	33
August 2	Jesica & Facundo	Charleston		9	5	10	**9**	33
August 2	Liz & Daniel	Charleston	Chicago – "Don't Tell Mama"	10	7	10	**10**	37
August 2	Rocío G. & Nicolás	Charleston		9	6	10	**10**	35
August 2	Gustavo & Abigail	Charleston		8	5	8	**8**	29
August 2	Matías & Gisela	Charleston		10	7	10	**10**	37
August 2	Carla & Damián	Charleston		9	5	10	**9**	33
August 6	Matías & Gisela	Hip-hop	Backstreet Boys – "Get Another Boyfriend"	**8**	4	8	8	28
August 6	Iliana & Maximiliano	Hip-hop	No Doubt – "Hey Baby"	**8**	3	7	8	26
August 6	Liz & Daniel	Hip-hop	Pussycat Dolls – "Don't Cha"	**8**	5	9	8	30
August 6	Catherine & Rodrigo	Hip-hop	The Black Eyed Peas – "Let's Get It Started"	**8**	5	10	9	32
August 6	Rocío M. & Iván	Hip-hop	The Black Eyed Peas – "My Humps"	**8**	6	10	9	32
August 6	Florencia & Martín	Hip-hop	Pink – "Get the Party Started"	**10**	7	10	10	37
August 6	Paula R. & Franco	Hip-hop	Beyoncé featuring Sean Paul – "Baby Boy"	**10**	7	9	10	36
August 6	Jesica & Franco	Hip-hop	Beyoncé featuring Jay-Z – "Déjà Vu"	**8**	4	8	9	29
August 6	Celina & Matías	Hip-hop	The Black Eyed Peas – "Pump It"	**8**	5	8	8	29
August 6	Rocío G. & Nicolás	Hip-hop	Britney Spears – "Do Somethin'"	**8**	6	9	9	29
August 6	Carla & Damián	Hip-hop	The Cheetah Girls – "The Party's Just Begun"	**8**	6	9	8	31
August 7	Liz & Daniel	Cumbia	Los Wawanco – "La Polllera Colorá"	**9**	7	10	10	34
August 7	Catherine & Rodrigo	Cumbia	Gilda – "No Me Arrepiento de Este Amor"	**10**	6	9	9	34
August 7	Iliana & Maximiliano	Cumbia	Los Wawanco – "Atrévete a Mirarme de Frente"	**9**	5	8	9	31
August 7	Rocío G. & Nicolás	Cumbia	Amar Azul – "Me Enamoré"	**9**	5	10	9	33
August 7	Carla & Damián	Cumbia	Lía Crucet – "La Güera Salomé"	**10**	7	10	10	37
August 7	Celina & Matías	Cumbia	Gladys La Bomba Tucumana – "La Pollera Amarilla"	**8**	5	9	8	30
August 7	Rocío M. & Iván	Cumbia	Los Palmeras – "Que Quiere la Chola"	**9**	6	9	9	33
August 7	Paula R. & Franco	Cumbia	Ráfaga – "Mentirosa"	**10**	7	10	10	37
August 7	Matías & Gisela	Cumbia	Sombras – "Pega la Vuelta"	**10**	5	10	9	33
August 7	Florencia & Martín	Cumbia	Lía Crucet – "Cumbia Apretadita"	**9**	6	10	10	35
August 7	Jesica & Franco	Cumbia	Los Palmeras – "Bombón Asesino"	**9**	6	9	9	33
August 10	Rocío M. & Iván	Pole dance	Aerosmith – "Love in an Elevator"	8	5	**10**	9	32
August 10	Catherine & Rodrigo	Pole dance	Prince – "Purple Rain"	8	4	**10**	10	32
August 10	Liz & Daniel	Pole dance	The Doors – "Roadhouse Blues"	9	5	**9**	9	32
August 10	Carla & Damián	Pole dance	Beyoncé – "Naughty Girl"	10	6	**9**	10	35
August 10	Florencia & Martín	Pole dance	Madonna – "Like a Virgin"	10	6	**10**	10	36
August 10	Rocío G. & Nicolás	Pole dance	The Cooltrane Quartet – "Should I Stay or Should I Go"	10	7	**10**	10	37
August 10	Celina & Matías	Pole dance	Era – "Enigma"	10	5	**9**	9	33
August 10	Matías & Gisela	Pole dance	Janet Jackson – "What About"	10	5	**10**	9	34
August 10	Nazarena & Facundo	Pole dance	David Bisbal – "Desnúdate Mujer"	10	6	**9**	9	34
August 10	Paula R. & Franco	Pole dance	Astor Piazzolla – "Libertango (Remix)"	9	5	**9**	9	32
August 14	Carla & Damián	Cuarteto	Rodrigo – "Soy Cordobés"	8	**5**	8	8	29
August 14	Matías & Gisela	Cuarteto	Alcides – "Violeta"	10	**6**	10	10	36
August 14	Celina & Matías	Cuarteto	La Mona Jiménez – "Beso A Beso"	9	**6**	10	9	34
August 14	Catherine & Rodrigo	Cuarteto	Rodrigo – "Ocho Cuarenta"	9	**6**	8	9	32
August 14	Rocío M. & Iván	Cuarteto	Rodrigo – "Cómo le Digo"	9	**6**	8	9	32
August 14	Paula R. & Franco	Cuarteto	Sabroso – "Mami Llegó Tu Papi"	9	**6**	8	9	32
August 14	Florencia & Martín	Cuarteto	Walter Olmos – "Por Lo Que Yo Te Quiero"	9	**6**	8	9	32
August 14	Silvia & Leandro	Cuarteto	La Mona Jiménez – "Beso A Beso"	9	**6**	8	8	31
August 16	Anabel & Lucas	Cuarteto	Jean Carlos – "Pero Me Acuerdo de Ti"	9	**6**	8	8	31
August 16	Rocío G. & Nicolás	Cuarteto	La Mona Jiménez – "Bum Bum"	10	**6**	10	10	36
August 16	M. Eugenia & Esteban	Cuarteto	Rodrigo – "Cómo Olvidarla"	9	**6**	8	9	32
August 16	Nazarena & Facundo	Cuarteto	Jean Carlos – "Quiéreme"	9	**6**	8	9	32
August 16	Flavia & Exequiel	Cuarteto	Rodrigo – "Lo Mejor del Amor"	9	**5**	8	9	31
August 16	Claudia & Maximiliano	Cuarteto	Trulala – "Te Vuelves Loca Conmigo"	10	**7**	10	10	37
August 16	Liz & Daniel	Cuarteto	Los Caligaris – "Nadie es Perfecto"	10	**7**	10	10	37
August 20	Catherine & Rodrigo	Jive	Wham! – "Wake Me Up Before You Go-Go"	**10**	5	9	9	33
August 20	Matías & Gisela	Jive	Elvis Presley – "All Shook Up"	**10**	6	10	9	35
August 20	M. Eugenia & Esteban	Jive	Shakin' Stevens – "Listen to Me"	**9**	6	9	9	33
August 20	Paula R. & Franco	Jive	Ray Charles – "Hit the Road Jack"	**10**	6	10	9	35
August 20	Florencia & Martín	Jive	Madonna – "Hanky Panky"	**10**	6	10	10	36
August 20	Silvia & Leandro	Jive	Bill Haley & His Comets – "See You Later, Alligator"	**9**	5	9	9	32
August 20	Flavia & Exequiel	Jive		**9**	7	10	10	36
August 21	Valeria & Matías	Jive	Bette Midler – "Stuff Like That There"	**10**	7	10	10	37
August 21	Nazarena & Facundo	Jive	Little Richard – "Tutti Frutti"	**9**	6	9	10	34
August 21	Rocío G. & Nicolás	Jive	The Brian Setzer Orchestra – "Jum Jive n' Wail"	**10**	7	10	10	37
August 21	Carla & Damián	Jive	Carlene Carter – "I Love You 'Cause I Want To"	**10**	6	10	10	36
August 21	Claudia & Maximiliano	Jive		**10**	6	10	10	36
August 21	Rocío M. & Iván	Jive		**9**	5	9	9	32
August 21	Liz & Daniel	Jive	The Slammers Maximum Band – "Jive Time!"	**10**	6	10	10	36
August 27	Florencia & Martín	Merengue	Los Reyes del Swing – "Moviendo las Caderas"	9	**6**	9	9	33
August 27	Paula R. & Franco	Merengue	Juan Luis Guerra 440 – "A Pedir Su Mano"	10	**7**	10	10	37
August 27	Claudia & Maximiliano	Merengue	Mickey Taveras – "Corazón Partio"	8	**4**	9	8	29
August 27	Celina & Matías	Merengue	Elvis Crespo – "Tu Sonrisa"	8	**5**	9	9	31
August 27	Matías & Gisela	Merengue	Oro Sólido – "Abusadora"	10	**5**	9	8	32
August 27	Rocío M. & Iván	Merengue	La Fiesta – "Enamorado"	9	**4**	9	8	30
August 27	M. Eugenia & Esteban	Merengue	Cristian Castro – "Azul"	9	**5**	9	9	32
August 27	Nazarena & Facundo	Merengue	Sergio Vargas – "La Ventanita"	8	**4**	9	8	29
August 28	Catherine & Rodrigo	Merengue	Juan Luis Guerra 440 – "La Bilirrubina"	10	**6**	9	8	33
August 28	Flavia & Exequiel	Merengue	Noelia – "Candela"	9	**4**	9	9	31
August 28	Liz & Daniel	Merengue	Jean Carlos – "Rey del Mambo"	10	**6**	10	10	36
August 28	Carla & Damián	Merengue	Banda XXI – "Esa Chica Tiene Swing"	10	**6**	10	10	36
August 28	Rocío G. & Nicolás	Merengue	Los Hermanos Rosario – "El Fin de Semana"	8	**5**	9	8	30

==== Re-entry ====
Re-entry
Date	Couple	Style	Song
August 9	Pamela & Alejandro	Pole dance	Moulin Rouge! – "El Tango de Roxanne"
August 9	Gustavo & Abigail	Pole dance	Joan Jett – "I Love Rock 'n' Roll"
August 9	Flavia & Exequiel	Pole dance	AC/DC – "Back in Black"
August 9	Ximena & Nicolás	Pole dance	Christina Aguilera, Lil' Kim, Mýa and Pink – "Lady Marmalade"
August 9	Silvia & Leandro	Pole dance	Madonna – "Fever"
August 9	Anabel & Lucas	Pole dance	Madonna – "Don't Tell Me"
August 9	Nina & Facundo	Pole dance	Five – "Everybody Get Up"
August 9	M. Eugenia & Esteban	Pole dance	Christina Aguilera – "Fighter"
August 9	Claudia & Maximiliano	Pole dance	Blondie – "Call Me"
August 9	J. María & Estefanía	Pole dance	Christina Aguilera – "Ain't No Other Man"
August 9	Locomotora & Enzo	Pole dance	Lenny Kravitz – "Rock and Roll Is Dead"
August 9	Paula M. & Alejandro	Pole dance	Michael Bublé – "Feeling Good"

=== September ===
Beat music, Arabic music, Music videos and Latin pop
Date	Couple	Style	Song	Score				Total
Date	Couple	Style	Song	Graciela	Jorge	Moria	Gerardo	Total
September 3	Claudia & Maximiliano	Beat music	Palito Ortega – "Viva la Vida"	10	5	**9**	9	33
September 3	Matías & Gisela	Beat music	Palito Ortega – "Un Muchacho Cómo Yo"	10	5	**9**	9	33
September 3	Carla & Damián	Beat music	Nicky Jones – "Corte y Confección"	10	5	**9**	9	33
September 3	Rocío M. & Iván	Beat music	Palito Ortega – "Camelia"	10	5	**10**	10	35
September 3	Liz & Daniel	Beat music	Jolly Land – "Renato"	9	5	**9**	9	32
September 3	Flavia & Exequiel	Beat music	Quique Villanueva – "Quiero Gritar Que Te Quiero"	9	5	**9**	9	32
September 3	Catherine & Rodrigo	Beat music	Violeta Rivas – "Qué Suerte"	10	5	**10**	10	35
September 4	Florencia & Martín	Beat music	Nicky Jones – "Besos de Papel"	10	5	**9**	9	33
September 4	Rocío G. & Nicolás	Beat music	Los Gatos – "Popotitos"	10	5	**9**	9	33
September 4	Celina & Matías	Beat music	Palito Ortega – "Media Novia"	8	4	**8**	9	29
September 4	Paula R. & Franco	Beat music	Palito Ortega – "Despeinada"	10	5	**10**	10	35
September 4	M. Eugenia & Esteban	Beat music	Palito Ortega – "Bienvenido Amor"	8	5	**8**	8	29
September 10	Rocío M. & Iván	Arabic music	Saber El Robaey – "Sidi Mansour"	9	4	8	**9**	30
September 10	Carla & Damián	Arabic music	Marcus Viana – "Maktub II"	10	5	8	**9**	32
September 10	M. Eugenia & Esteban	Arabic music	Ehab Tawfik – "Allah Aleik Ya Sidi"	10	5	9	**9**	33
September 10	Paula R. & Franco	Arabic music		10	4	9	**9**	32
September 10	Liz & Daniel	Arabic music	Mario Kirlis – "Tamil"	10	5	9	**10**	34
September 10	Matías & Gisela	Arabic music	Ali Mohammed – "Raks Bedeya"	10	7	10	**10**	37
September 11	Celina & Matías	Arabic music	Tarkan– "Ölürüm Sana"	9	5	10	**10**	34
September 11	Florencia & Martín	Arabic music	Tarkan – "Şımarık"	9	5	10	**10**	34
September 11	Rocío G. & Nicolás	Arabic music		10	4	10	**10**	34
September 11	Catherine & Rodrigo	Arabic music	Tarkan – "Şıkıdım"	10	4	8	**9**	31
September 11	Claudia & Maximiliano	Arabic music	Amr Diab – "Habibi Ya Nour Al Ain"	9	5	9	**9**	32
September 17	Matías & Gisela	Music videos	Michael Jackson – "Billie Jean"	9	4	**8**	8	29
September 17	Liz & Daniel	Music videos	Britney Spears – "Toxic"	10	5	**10**	9	34
September 17	Celina & Matías	Music videos	Madonna – "Material Girl"	9	5	**10**	10	34
September 17	Carla & Damián	Music videos	Beyoncé featuring Jay-Z – "Crazy in Love"	9	5	**10**	10	34
September 17	Rocío M. & Iván	Music videos	Britney Spears – "(You Drive Me) Crazy"	10	5	**10**	10	35
September 18	Catherine & Rodrigo	Music videos	Shakira – "Te Aviso, Te Anuncio (Tango)"	9	5	**9**	8	31
September 18	Paula R. & Franco	Music videos	Madonna – "Jump"	10	8	**10**	10	38
September 18	Rocío G. & Nicolás	Music videos	Madonna – "Like a Virgin"	10	6	**8**	8	32
September 18	Florencia & Martín	Music videos	Jennifer Lopez – "Let's Get Loud"	10	7	**10**	10	37
September 18	M. Eugenia & Esteban	Music videos	Madonna – "Vogue"	10	5	**10**	10	35
September 24	Florencia & Rodrigo	Latin pop	David Bisbal – "Lloraré las Penas"	10	**6**	9	8	33
September 24	Paula R. & Franco	Latin pop	Ricky Martin – "Livin' la Vida Loca"	10	**7**	10	10	37
September 24	M. Eugenia & Esteban	Latin pop	Ricky Martin – "María"	8	**6**	9	8	31
September 24	Carla & Damián	Latin pop	Ricky Martin – "She Bangs"	10	**6**	9	8	33
September 24	Matías & Gisela	Latin pop	Chayanne – "Provócame"	10	**4**	9	8	31
September 25	Cinthia & Rodrigo	Latin pop	Ricky Martin – "Pégate"	10	**6**	9	8	33
September 25	Rocío M. & Iván	Latin pop	Thalía – "A Quién le Importa"	9	**5**	8	8	30
September 25	Celina & Matías	Latin pop	Thalía – "Arrasando"	10	**6**	9	8	33
September 25	Liz & Daniel	Latin pop	Thalía – "Mujer Latina"	10	**7**	10	10	37

=== October ===
Rumba Flamenca, Cuarteto, Music videos, Cumbia, Samba, Country and Reggaeton
Date	Couple	Style	Song	Score				Total
Date	Couple	Style	Song	Graciela	Jorge	Moria	Gerardo	Total
October 1	Liz & Daniel	Rumba Flamenca	Gipsy Kings – "Bamboleo"	**10**	6	9	8	33
October 1	Cinthia & Rodrigo	Rumba Flamenca	Gipsy Kings – "Djobi Djoba"	**9**	6	9	8	31
October 1	Carla & Damián	Rumba Flamenca	Estopa – "Tu Calorro"	**8**	5	9	8	29
October 1	Florencia & Martín	Rumba Flamenca	Rosario Flores – "Muchas Flores"	**9**	6	9	8	31
October 1	Paula R. & Franco	Rumba Flamenca	Gipsy Kings – "Vamos a Bailar"	**10**	7	10	10	37
October 1	M. Eugenia & Esteban	Rumba Flamenca	Bebe – "Malo"	**10**	5	10	10	35
October 1	Rocío M. & Iván	Rumba Flamenca	Marismeños – "Caramba, Carambita"	**9**	6	9	10	33
October 1	Celina & Matías	Rumba Flamenca	Estopa – "Por la Raja de tu Falda"	**10**	6	10	10	36
October 2	M. Eugenia & Esteban	Cuarteto	Rodrigo – "Cómo Olvidarla"	**9**	6	10	10	34
October 2	Carla & Damian	Cuarteto	Rodrigo – "Soy Cordobés"	**10**	6	9	9	34
October 2	Paula R. & Franco	Cuarteto	Sabroso – "Mami Llego Tu Papi"	**10**	5	10	10	35
October 2	Rocío M. & Iván	Cuarteto	Rodrigo – "Cómo le Digo"	**8**	5	9	8	29
October 2	Florencia & Martín	Cuarteto	Walter Olmos – "Por Lo Que Yo Te Quiero"	**10**	7	10	10	37
October 2	Celina & Matías	Cuarteto	La Mona Jiménez – "Beso A Beso"	**10**	6	10	10	36
October 2	Liz & Daniel	Cuarteto	Los Caligaris – "Nadie es Perfecto"	**10**	6	10	10	36
October 2	Cinthia & Rodrigo	Cuarteto	Rodrigo – "Ocho Cuarenta"	**10**	6	10	9	35
October 8	Florencia & Martín	Music videos	Christina Aguilera – "Fighter"	10	**5**	10	10	35
October 8	Paula R. & Franco	Music videos	Madonna – "Hung Up"	10	**6**	10	10	36
October 8	M. Eugenia & Esteban	Music videos	Madonna – "Express Yourself"	10	**5**	10	10	35
October 8	Carla & Damián	Music videos	Christina Aguilera – "Ain't No Other Man"	10	**5**	10	10	35
October 8	Celina & Matías	Music videos	Jennifer Lopez – "Get Right"	10	**6**	10	10	36
October 8	Liz & Daniel	Music videos	Christina Aguilera – "Dirrty"	10	**7**	10	10	37
October 8	Cinthia & Rodrigo	Music videos	Christina Aguilera – "Ven Conmigo (Solamente Tú)"	10	**5**	10	10	35
October 9	M. Eugenia & Esteban	Cumbia	Los Palmeras – "Bombóm Asesino"	10	**5**	10	9	34
October 9	Florencia & Martín	Cumbia	Lía Crucet – "La Güera Salomé"	10	**6**	10	10	36
October 9	Celina & Matías	Cumbia	La Cumbia – "Porque Te Amo"	10	**5**	10	10	35
October 9	Liz & Daniel	Cumbia	Aniceto Molina – "El Campanero"	10	**6**	10	10	36
October 9	Paula R. & Franco	Cumbia	Aniceto Molina – "Negra Caderona"	10	**6**	10	10	36
October 9	Cinthia & Rodrigo	Cumbia	Los Charros – "La Pollera Colorá"	10	**5**	10	10	35
October 9	Carla & Damián	Cumbia	Gladys La Bomba Tucumana – "La Pollera Amarilla"	10	**6**	10	10	36
October 15	Cinthia & Rodrigo	Samba	Ricky Martin – "La Bomba"	8	5	**8**	8	29
October 15	Celina & Matías	Samba	Natalia Oreiro – "Que Digan Lo Que Quieran"	9	6	**10**	9	34
October 15	Paula R. & Franco	Samba	Paulina Rubio – "Vive El Verano"	10	7	**10**	10	37
October 15	Carla & Damián	Samba	Shakira featuring Alejandro Sanz – "La Tortura"	10	6	**10**	10	36
October 15	Florencia & Martín	Samba	Sérgio Mendes – "Magalenha"	10	7	**10**	10	37
October 15	Liz & Daniel	Samba	Rosario Flores – "La Rumba del Bongo"	10	6	**9**	9	34
October 22	Celina & Matías	Country	Creedence Clearwater Revival – "Lookin' out My Back Door"	10	6	10	**10**	36
October 22	Paula R. & Franco	Country	Billy Ray Cyrus – "Achy Breaky Heart"	10	6	10	**10**	36
October 22	Carla & Damián	Country	Kenny Rogers – "The Gambler"	10	6	10	**10**	36
October 22	Florencia & Martín	Country	Creedence Clearwater Revival – "Jambalaya (On the Bayou)"	10	6	10	**10**	36
October 22	Liz & Daniel	Country	Creedence Clearwater Revival – "Bad Moon Rising"	10	6	10	**10**	36
October 23	Carla & Damián	Reggaeton	Héctor & Tito – "Baila Morena"	10	6	10	**10**	36
October 23	Paula R. & Franco	Reggaeton	Ricky Martin featuring Daddy Yankee – "Drop It on Me"	10	6	10	**10**	36
October 23	Florencia & Martín	Reggaeton	Don Omar – "Dile"	10	7	10	**10**	37
October 23	Celina & Matías	Reggaeton	Daddy Yankee – "Dale Caliente"	10	7	10	**10**	37
October 23	Liz & Daniel	Reggaeton	Daddy Yankee – "Métele con Candela"	10	7	10	**10**	37

==== Semi-final and Final ====
Semi-final and Final
Date	Couple	Style	Song	Points				Result
Date	Couple	Style	Song	Graciela	Jorge	Moria	Gerardo	Result
1st Semi-final (October 29)	Liz & Daniel	Swing	Duke Ellington – "If Don't Mean a Thing"	–	–	1	1	**1**
1st Semi-final (October 29)	Celina & Matías	Swing	Glenn Miller – "In the Mood"	1	1	–	–	**1**
1st Semi-final (October 29)	Liz & Daniel	Salsa	Dark Latin Groove – "Acuyuyé"	1	1	1	1	**1**
1st Semi-final (October 29)	Celina & Matías	Salsa	Charlie Cruz – "Bombón de Azúcar"	–	–	–	–	–
1st Semi-final (October 29)	Liz & Daniel	Lambada	Ivete Sangalo – "A Galera"	–	–	1	–	–
1st Semi-final (October 29)	Celina & Matías	Lambada	Kaoma – "Dança Tago Mago"	1	1	–	1	**1**
2nd Semi-final (October 30)	Florencia & Martín	Axé	Tchakabum – "Dança da Mãozinha"	1	1	1	–	**1**
2nd Semi-final (October 30)	Paula R. & Franco	Axé	Terra Samba – "Treme Terra"	–	–	–	1	–
2nd Semi-final (October 30)	Florencia & Martín	Rock and roll	John Travolta – "Greased Lightnin"	–	–	–	1	–
2nd Semi-final (October 30)	Paula R. & Franco	Rock and roll	Elvis Presley – "All Shook Up"	1	1	1	–	**1**
2nd Semi-final (October 30)	Florencia & Martín	Cha-cha-cha	Pussycat Dolls – "Sway"	–	1	1	–	**1**
2nd Semi-final (October 30)	Paula R. & Franco	Cha-cha-cha	Christina Aguilera – "Falsas Esperanzas"	1	–	–	1	**1**
Final (November 6)	Celina & Matías	Cumbia	Gladys La Bomba Tucumana – "La Pollera Amarilla"	1	1	1	–	**1**
Final (November 6)	Paula R. & Franco	Cumbia	Ráfaga – "Mentirosa"	–	–	–	1	–
Final (November 6)	Celina & Matías	Disco	Earth, Wind & Fire – "Boogie Wonderland"	–	1	–	–	–
Final (November 6)	Paula R. & Franco	Disco	Donna Summer – "Last Dance"	1	–	1	1	**1**
Final (November 6)	Celina & Matías	Latin pop	Thalía – "Arrasando"	1	1	–	–	**1**
Final (November 6)	Paula R. & Franco	Latin pop	Ricky Martin – "Livin' la Vida Loca"	–	–	1	1	**1**
