= Bailando por un Sueño (Argentine TV series) season 3 =

Bailando por un Sueño
- Season 3

Release
- Original network: Canal 13
- Original release: October 2 – December 21, 2006

Season chronology
- ← Previous; Season 2 Next → Bailando por un Sueño 2007

Bailando por un Sueño 3 was the third Argentine season of Bailando por un Sueño. The first show of the season aired on October 2, 2006, and was part of the original show broadcast as Showmatch on Canal 13 and hosted by Marcelo Tinelli, as well as the previous season that had finished a month before. This time, there were 15 couples competing, and the competition lasted 12 weeks. The winner was revealed on the season finale, on December 21, 2006: model, TV host and actress Carla Conte, who was paired with the professional dancer, Guillermo Conforte.

In this third season, the panel of judges was headed until November 23, 2006, by entrepreneur and TV producer/host Gerardo Sofovich, alongside journalist Jorge Lafauci, actress and dancer Moria Casán, and actress and dancer Reina Reech. On Tuesday, November 21, Mr. Sofovich announced that he would be resigning as president of the panel of judges on account of what he felt were “some participants’ insolence and lack of respect for the judges”, and his vexation at the quarrels that had involved him (first with celebrity Laura Fidalgo, with whom he had already had an altercation before the contest, then with Javier Rojas, and lastly with the recently evicted Eduardo Garro). Although the show's host and producer (and Mr. Sofovich's personal friend) Marcelo Tinelli entreated with him to stay, it was announced that his replacements would rotate weekly for the remainder of the show. For the week of November 27, former football star Diego Maradona (who had competed in the Italian Ballando con le Stelle in 2005) took over Sofovich's seat in the panel of judges. He was replaced the following week by Florencia de la V, winner of the second season of the show for the rest of the show's run, but Moria Casán took over. Samuel Gelblung presided over the semifinals, but Sofovich came back in the season finale to crown the winner.

== Couples ==
Celebrity	Notability	Professional Partner	Status
Alejandra Pradón	Model and Vedette	Nicolás Avoletta	Eliminated 1st by the 10%
Beatriz Salomón	Actress	Franco Contreras	Eliminated 2nd by the 37%
Karina Jelinek	Model	César Soria	Eliminated 3rd by the 42%
Amalia "Yuyito" González	Actress	Carlos Juárez	Eliminated 4th by the 26%
Ginette Reynal	Model and Presenter	Pablo Pezet	Eliminated 5th by the 46%
Marcela "La Tigresa" Acuña	Boxer	Javier Riveros	Eliminated 6th by the 37%
Julieta Prandi	Model and Presenter	Eduardo Garro	Eliminated 7th by the 31%
Evangelina Carrozzo	Model	Javier Rojas	Eliminated 8th by the 46.8%
Eliana Guercio	Model and Actress	Diego Viera	Eliminated 9th by the 45%
Luciana Salazar	Model	Luis David Jazmín	Eliminated 10th by the 47%
María Valenzuela	Actress	Matías Pedemonte	Eliminated 11th by the 45%
Ximena Capristo	Model and Actress	Guido de Paoli	Semifinalists by the 48%
Laura Fidalgo	Dancer	Gustavo Rojas	Semifinalists by the 47%
María Vázquez	Model and Presenter	Diego Bogado	Second Place by the 42%
Carla Conte	Model and Presenter	Guillermo Conforte	Winners by the 58%

== Scoring chart ==
Celebrity	Place																	
Celebrity	Place	01	02	03	04	05	06	07	08	09	10	11	12	SF		Final		
Celebrity	Place	01	02	03	04	05	06	07	08	09	10	11	12	01	02	Final		
Celebrity	Place	Carla & Guillermo	1	32	34	35	29	65	54	62	71	54	43	36	29^{1}		6	5
María & Diego	2	26	27	33	31	59	68	64	59	61	68	31	37	4		1		
Laura & Gustavo	3	35	31	35	35	65	66	68	68	73	72	33	33		1			
Ximena & Guido	3	25	22	34	26	59	61	70	65	51	68	29	30^{1}	1				
María & Matías	5	27	30	32	35	58	72	66	71	65	68	30						
Luciana & Luis	6	25	30	33	35	70	57	58	69	73	43							
Eliana & Diego	7	23	25	32	31	63	63	62	47	44								
Evangelina & Javier	8	23	26	29	24	54	62	55	54									
Julieta & Eduardo	9	22	25	23	26	61	66	58										
Tigresa & Javier	10	14	18	26	22	50	52											
Ginette & Pablo	11	19	24	30	33	47												
Yuyito & Carlos	12	17	21	27	21													
Karina & Cesar	13	16	22	21														
Beatriz & Franco	14	15	20															
Alejandra & Nicolás	15	15																

^{1} Couples in the bottom two, but in this week there was elimination.

Red numbers indicate the lowest score for each week.
Green numbers indicate the highest score for each week.
indicates the couple eliminated that week.
indicates the couple was saved by the public.
indicates the winning couple.
indicates the runner-up couple.
indicates the semifinalists couples.

=== Highest and lowest scoring performances ===
The best and worst performances in each dance according to the judges' marks are as follows:

Dance	Best dancer(s)	Best score	Worst dancer(s)	Worst score
Disco	Laura Fidalgo	35	Marcela "La Tigresa" Acuña	14
Cha-cha-cha	Carla Conte	34	Marcela "La Tigresa" Acuña	18
Hip-hop	Carla Conte; Laura Fidalgo	35	Karina Jelinek	21
Salsa	Luciana Salazar; Laura Fidalgo; María del Carmen Valenzuela	35	Amalia "Yuyito" González	21
Rock and roll Milonga	Luciana Salazar	70	Ginette Reynal	47
Jazz Chamamé	María del Carmen Valenzuela	72	Marcela "La Tigresa" Acuña	52
Axé music Waltz	Ximena Capristo	70	Evangelina Carrozzo	55
Swing Merengue	María del Carmen Valenzuela; Carla Conte	71	Eliana Guercio	47
Lambada Charleston	Luciana Salazar; Laura Fidalgo	73	Eliana Guercio	44
Mambo Arabic music	Laura Fidalgo	72	Carla Conte; Luciana Salazar	43
Reggaeton	Carla Conte	36	Ximena Capristo	29
Argentine cumbia	María del Carmen Valenzuela	37	Carla Conte	29

== Styles, scores and songs ==
=== Week 1: Disco ===
Running order

Date	Celebrity	Scores	Music	Result
October 2	María Valenzuela	27 (8, 5, 7, 7)	"I Am What I Am"—Gloria Gaynor	Safe
October 2	Eliana Guercio	23 (7, 3, 6, 7)	"Boogie Wonderland"—Earth, Wind & Fire	Safe
October 2	Ginette Reynal	19 (6, 2, 5, 6)	"We Are Family"—Sister Sledge	Safe
October 2	Marcela "La Tigresa" Acuña	14 (4, 1, 4, 5)	"Hot Stuff"—Donna Summer	Saved (67%)
October 3	Ximena Capristo	25 (7, 4, 7, 7)	"That's the Way (I Like It)"—KC and the Sunshine Band	Safe
October 3	Beatriz Salomón	15 (5, 2, 4, 4)	"I Will Survive"—Gloria Gaynor	Saved (23%)
October 3	María Vázquez	26 (8, 4, 7, 7)	"Gloria"—Laura Branigan	Safe
October 4	Alejandra Pradón	15 (5, 1, 5, 4)	"Young Hearts Run Free"—Kym Mazelle	Eliminated (10%)
October 4	Karina Jelinek	16 (6, 1, 4, 5)	"September"—Earth, Wind & Fire	Safe
October 4	Laura Fidalgo	33 (9, 7, 9, 8)	"Last Dance"—Donna Summer	Safe
October 5	Carla Conte	32 (9, 6, 8, 9)	"Disco Inferno"—The Trammps	Safe
October 5	Luciana Salazar	25 (7, 4, 7, 7)	"YMCA"—Village People	Safe
October 5	Julieta Prandi	22 (6, 4, 6, 6)	"Never Can Say Goodbye"—Gloria Gaynor	Safe
October 5	Evangelina Carrozzo	23 (6, 5, 6, 6)	"(Shake, Shake, Shake) Shake Your Booty"—KC and the Sunshine Band	Safe
October 5	Amalia "Yuyito" González	17 (6, 1, 5, 5)	"Strong Enough"—Cher	Safe

=== Week 2 ===
Cha-cha-cha
Date	Celebrity	Song	Score				Total
Date	Celebrity	Song	RR	JL	MC	GS	Total
October 9	Eliana & Diego		8	4	6	7	25
October 9	Ximena & Guido	Caetano Veloso — "Capullito de Alelí"	7	3	5	7	22
October 9	María del Carmen & Matías		8	6	8	8	30
October 10	Ginette & Pablo	Santana featuring Maná — "Corazón espinado"	7	3	7	7	24
October 10	Tigresa & Javier		5	2	5	6	18
October 10	Julieta & Eduardo	Son by Four — "Sofía"	6	5	7	7	25
October 11	María & Diego	La Mosca — "Cha Cha Cha"	8	5	7	7	27
October 11	Beatriz & Franco		5	3	6	6	20
October 11	Carla & Guillermo	Thalía — "Echa Pa' Lante"	9	6	9	10	34
October 12	Karina & César	Celia Cruz — "Ríe y Llora"	6	4	6	6	22
October 12	Evangelina & Javier	Michael Stuart — "Déjala Que Baile"	7	4	7	8	26
October 12	Yuyito & Carlos	Rubén Rada — "Cha Cha Muchacha"	6	2	7	6	21
October 12	Luciana & Luis	Ricky Martin — "Amor"	8	6	7	9	30
October 12	Laura & Gustavo	Jennifer Lopez — "Let's Get Loud"	8	6	9	8	31

- Sentenced:
- Saved by the public:
- Eliminated:

=== Week 3 ===
Hip-hop
Date	Celebrity	Song	Score				Total
Date	Celebrity	Song	RR	JL	MC	GS	Total
October 16	Evangelina & Javier	Destiny's Child — "Bootylicious"	8	6	8	8	29
October 16	Julieta & Eduardo	Beyoncé featuring Jay-Z — "Crazy in Love"	7	4	6	6	23
October 16	Karina & César	Britney Spears — "I'm a Slave 4 U"	7	3	5	6	21
October 17	Laura & Gustavo	The Black Eyed Peas — "Pump It"	9	7	9	10	35
October 17	María del Carmen & Matías	Destiny's Child — "Lose My Breath"	8	6	8	10	32
October 17	Tigresa & Javier		8	2	8	8	26
October 18	Ximena & Guido	Christina Aguilera — "Dirrty"	9	6	9	10	34
October 18	María & Diego	The Black Eyed Peas — "Let's Get It Started"	10	6	8	9	33
October 18	Ginette & Pablo	Madonna — "Music"	8	5	9	8	30
October 19	Luciana & Luis	Britney Spears — "Overprotected"	9	6	9	9	33
October 19	Eliana & Diego	Pussycat Dolls — "Don't Cha"	9	7	8	8	32
October 19	Carla & Guillermo	Usher featuring Lil' Jon and Ludacris — "Yeah!"	9	6	10	10	35
October 19	Yuyito & Carlos	Britney Spears — "Do Somethin'"	7	6	7	7	27

- Sentenced:
- Saved by the public:
- Eliminated:

=== Week 4 ===
Salsa
Date	Celebrity	Song	Score				Total
Date	Celebrity	Song	RR	JL	MC	GS	Total
October 23	Carla & Guillermo	Gilberto Santa Rosa — "Déjate Querer"	8	4	8	9	29
October 23	Evangelina & Javier	George Lamond — "Si Te Vas"	7	3	7	7	24
October 23	Ximena & Guido	Grupo Niche — "La Negra No Quiere"	7	5	7	7	26
October 24	María & Diego	Celia Cruz — "Que le Den Candela"	9	8	8	8	31
October 24	Claudia & Pablo		8	6	10	9	33
October 24	Eliana & Diego	Celia Cruz and Willie Colón — "Cuba Que Lindos Son Tus Paisajes"	8	6	9	8	31
October 25	María del Carmen & Matías	Gloria Estefan featuring Celia Cruz — "Tres Gotas De Agua Bendita"	9	7	9	10	35
October 25	Yuyito & Carlos		7	2	6	6	21
October 25	Julieta & Eduardo	Dark Latin Groove — "La Quiero a Morir"	7	5	7	7	26
October 25	Laura & Gustavo	Dark Latin Groove — "Acuyuyé"	10	7	9	9	35
October 25	Luciana & Luis	Sexappeal — "La Llorona"	9	6	10	10	26
October 25	Tigresa and Javier		5	3	7	7	22

- Sentenced:
- Saved by the public:
- Eliminated:

=== Week 5 ===
Rock and roll
Date	Celebrity	Song	Score				Total
Date	Celebrity	Song	RR	JL	MC	GS	Total
October 30	Ginette & Pablo	Elvis Presley — "Hound Dog"	7	3	7	7	24
October 30	Ximena & Guido	Jerry Lee Lewis — "Great Balls of Fire"	9	6	9	9	33
October 30	Laura & Gustavo	Kenny Loggins — "Footloose"	7	5	8	8	28
October 31	María & Diego	Queen — "Crazy Little Thing Called Love"	8	5	9	8	30
October 31	Luciana & Luis	Creedence Clearwater Revival — "Travelin' Band"	10	7	10	10	37
November 1	Carla & Guillermo	Elvis Presley — "Hard Headed Woman"	8	5	8	8	29
November 1	María del Carmen & Matías	Bill Haley and His Comets — "Rock Around the Clock"	8	5	8	8	29
November 1	Eliana & Diego	Elvis Presley — "Jailhouse Rock"	8	5	9	9	31
November 2	Evangelina C. & Javier	Little Richard — "Long Tall Sally"	7	6	8	8	29
November 2	Evangelina A. & Eduardo	Little Richard — "Tutti Frutti"	8	7	9	9	33
November 2	Tigresa and Javier	John Travolta — "Grease Lightning"	7	3	7	8	25

Milonga
Date	Celebrity	Song	Score				Total
Date	Celebrity	Song	RR	JL	MC	GS	Total
October 30	María del Carmen & Matías	Homero Manzi — "Milonga del Novecientos"	8	5	8	8	29
October 30	Eliana & Diego		8	6	9	9	32
October 30	Evangelina A. & Eduardo		7	4	8	9	28
October 31	Tigresa & Javier		6	4	8	7	25
October 31	Evangelina C. & Javier		7	4	7	7	25
November 1	Ginette & Pablo	Jorge Falcón — "Azúcar, Pimienta y Sal"	5	4	7	7	23
November 1	Ximena & Guido		7	4	7	8	26
November 2	Carla & Guillermo	Alfredo de Angelis — "Corralera"	10	6	10	10	36
November 2	María & Diego	Juan Carlos Baglietto — "Milonga Sentimental"	8	5	7	9	29
November 2	Laura & Gustavo	Francisco Canaro — "Orillera"	10	7	10	10	37
November 2	Luciana & Luis		9	5	9	10	33

- Sentenced:
- Saved by the public:
- Eliminated:

=== Week 6 ===
Chamamé
Date	Celebrity	Song	Score				Total
Date	Celebrity	Song	RR	JL	MC	GS	Total
November 6	Carla & Guillermo		7	4	6	6	23
November 6	María del Carmen & Matías		9	6	10	10	35
November 7	Eliana & Diego		8	5	7	9	29
November 7	Julieta & Eduardo		8	5	8	9	30
November 8	Laura & Gustavo		9	6	9	7	31
November 8	Evangelina & Javier		8	6	9	8	31
November 8	Tigresa & Javier		6	4	6	7	23
November 9	Ximena & Guido		9	6	9	10	34
November 9	Luciana & Luis		8	5	8	9	30
November 9	María & Diego		9	6	10	10	35

Jazz
Date	Celebrity	Song	Score				Total
Date	Celebrity	Song	RR	JL	MC	GS	Total
November 6	Evangelina & Javier	Ella Fitzgerald — "Gypsy in My Soul"	8	7	8	8	31
November 6	Laura & Gustavo	Frank Sinatra — "Cheek to Cheek"	9	7	9	10	35
November 7	Ximena & Guido	Bobby Darin — "Beyond the Sea"	7	5	7	8	27
November 7	Luciana & Luis	Frank Sinatra — "Come Fly with Me"	7	4	8	8	27
November 7	Tigresa & Javier	Frank Sinatra — "I Believe"	8	3	9	9	29
November 8	María & Diego	Michael Bublé — "Mack the Knife"	9	7	9	8	33
November 8	Carla & Guillermo	George Michael — "Secret Love"	9	5	8	8	31
November 9	María del Carmen & Matías	Stevie Wonder — "Sunshine of My Life"	10	7	10	10	37
November 9	Julieta & Eduardo	Frank Sinatra — "Heaven"	9	7	10	10	36
November 9	Eliana & Diego	Nat King Cole — "Straighten Up and Fly Right"	9	6	9	10	34

- Sentenced:
- Saved by the public:
- Eliminated:

=== Week 7 ===
Waltz
Date	Celebrity	Song	Score				Total
Date	Celebrity	Song	RR	JL	MC	GS	Total
November 13	Evangelina & Javier	Johann Strauss II — "The Blue Danube"	7	5	7	7	26
November 13	Laura & Gustavo	Pyotr Ilyich Tchaikovsky — "Swan Lake Waltz"	8	7	9	9	33
November 14	Eliana & Diego		8	7	9	8	32
November 14	Julieta & Eduardo		7	6	8	8	29
November 15	María del Carmen & Matías	Pyotr Ilyich Tchaikovsky — "Waltz of the Flowers"	9	7	9	8	33
November 15	María & Diego		8	6	8	8	30
November 16	Ximena & Guido	Bobby Darin — "Beyond the Sea"	9	6	10	10	35
November 16	Luciana & Luis		8	5	7	8	28
November 16	Carla & Guillermo		8	4	8	8	28

Axé
Date	Celebrity	Song	Score				Total
Date	Celebrity	Song	RR	JL	MC	GS	Total
November 13	María del Carmen & Matías	Tchakabum – "Tesouro de Pirata"	9	7	8	9	33
November 13	María & Diego	Tchakabum – "Dança da Mãoçinha"	9	7	8	10	34
November 14	Ximena & Guido	Terra Samba – "Cabezinha"	9	7	10	9	35
November 14	Luciana & Luis	É o Tchan! – "Na Boquinha da Garrafa"	8	6	8	8	30
November 15	Carla & Guillermo	Terra Samba – "Treme Terra"	9	7	9	9	34
November 15	Evangelina & Javier		8	6	8	7	29
November 15	Laura & Gustavo	Margareth Menezes – "Dandalunda"	9	7	10	9	35
November 15	Eliana & Diego	É o Tchan! – "Segure o Tchan"	8	6	8	8	30
November 15	Julieta & Eduardo	Terra Samba – "Na Manteiga"	8	7	7	7	29

- Sentenced:
- Saved by the public:
- Eliminated:

=== Week 8 ===
Swing
Date	Celebrity	Song	Score				Total
Date	Celebrity	Song	RR	JL	MC	GS	Total
November 20	Eliana & Diego	Benny Goodman – "Sing, Sing, Sing (With a Swing)"	8	6	7	8	29
November 20	Carla & Guillermo	The Andrews Sisters – "Bounce Me Brother"	10	7	9	10	36
November 21	Luciana & Luis	Glenn Miller – "In the Mood"	10	7	10	10	37
November 22	Laura & Gustavo	Duke Ellington – "It Don't Mean a Thing (If It Ain't Got That Swing)"	10	8	10	10	38
November 22	María del Carmen & Matías		10	6	9	10	35
November 23	Ximena & Guido	Fishbone – "Let the Good Times Roll"	9	7	8	8	32
November 23	María & Diego	Fishbone – "Let the Good Times Roll"	8	6	8	8	30
November 23	Evangelina & Javier		7	6	8	7	28

Merengue
Date	Celebrity	Song	Score				Total
Date	Celebrity	Song	RR	JL	MC	GS	Total
November 20	María del Carmen & Matías		8	5	7	8	28
November 21	Ximena & Guido	Oro Solido – "Moviendo las Caderas"	10	7	10	9	36
November 21	María & Diego	Elvis Crespo – "Suavemente"	10	6	8	10	34
November 22	Evangelina & Javier	Caña Braba – "Enamorado"	8	5	8	8	29
November 22	Eliana & Diego	Olga Tañón – "Es Mentiroso"	8	3	8	8	27
November 23	Carla & Guillermo	Banda XXI – "Esa Chica Tiene Swing"	9	6	9	9	33
November 23	Luciana & Luis	Jean Carlos – "Quiéreme"	9	4	8	10	31
November 23	Laura & Gustavo	Juan Luis Guerra 440 – "La Cosquillita"	8	6	8	8	30

- Sentenced:
- Saved by the public:
- Eliminated:

=== Week 9 ===
Charleston
Date	Celebrity	Song	Score				Total
Date	Celebrity	Song	RR	JL	MC	GS	Total
November 27	Ximena & Guido	Chicago – "All That Jazz"	7	4	8	8	27
November 27	Carla & Guillermo	Chicago – "The Hot Honey Rag"	9	6	9	9	33
November 28	Eliana & Diego	Ruby Wils – "When the Saints Go Marching In"	8	5	7	8	28
November 29	María del Carmen & Matías	New Orleans Syncopation – "Charleston"	10	7	10	10	37
November 30	Laura & Gustavo	The Original New Orleans Jazz Band – "Sweet Georgia Brown"	10	7	10	10	37
November 30	Victoria & Diego		8	5	9	9	31
November 30	Luciana & Luis	Five Foot Two – "Alexander's Ragtime Band"	9	7	10	10	36

Lambada
Date	Celebrity	Song	Score				Total
Date	Celebrity	Song	RR	JL	MC	GS	Total
November 27	María del Carmen & Matías	Kaoma – "Jambé Finète (Grille)"	7	5	7	10	29
November 28	Laura & Gustavo	Kaoma – "Mélodie d'Amour"	9	7	10	10	36
November 28	Victoria & Diego		8	5	8	9	30
November 29	Ximena & Guido	Kaoma – "Dançando Lambada"	8	5	8	8	29
November 29	Luciana & Luis	Irmãos Verdades – "Ès a Minha Doçura"	9	5	8	10	32
November 30	Carla & Guillermo	Kaoma – "Lamba Caribe"	10	7	10	10	37
November 30	Eliana & Diego	Kaoma – "Chorando Se Foi (Lambada)"	9	5	8	9	31

- Sentenced:
- Saved by the public:
- Eliminated:

=== Week 10 ===
Mambo
Date	Celebrity	Song	Score				Total
Date	Celebrity	Song	RR	JL	MC	GS	Total
December 4	Carla & Guillermo	Tito Puente – "Mambo Paris"				?	
December 4	María & Diego					?	
December 5	Laura & Gustavo	Tito Puente – "Pa' Los Rumberos"				?	
December 5	María del Carmen & Matías	Tito Puente – "Ran Kan Kan"				?	
December 6	Luciana & Luis	Perez Prado – "Mambo 8"				?	
December 6	Ximena & Guido	Lou Bega – "Mambo No. 5"				?	

Arabic
Date	Celebrity	Song	Score				Total
Date	Celebrity	Song	RR	JL	MC	GS	Total
December 4	Luciana & Luis	Tarkan – "Şımarık"				?	
December 4	María del Carmen & Matías	Saber El Robaey – "Sidi Mansour"				?	
December 5	Ximena & Guido	Amr Diab – "Habibi Ya Nour El Ain"				?	
December 5	Carla & Guillermo	Marcus Viana – "Maktub II"				?	
December 5	María & Diego	Ali Mohammed – "Raks Bedeya"				?	
December 6	Laura & Gustavo	Ehab Tawfik – "Allah Aleik Ya Sidi"				?	

- Sentenced:
- Saved by the public:
- Eliminated:

=== Week 11 ===
Reggaeton
Date	Celebrity	Song	Score				Total
Date	Celebrity	Song	RR	JL	MC	GS	Total
December 11	Carla & Guillermo	Héctor & Tito – "Baila Morena"	10	6	10	10	36
December 11	Laura & Gustavo	Ricky Martin – "Qué Más Da"	9	7	9	8	33
December 11	María del Carmen & Matías	Daddy Yankee – "Lo Que Pasó, Pasó"	8	4	8	8	28
December 11	María & Diego	Daddy Yankee – "Gasolina"	8	6	9	8	31
December 11	Ximena & Guido	Don Omar – "Dile"	8	4	9	9	30

- Sentenced:
- Saved by the public:
- Eliminated:

=== Week 12 ===
Cumbia
Date	Celebrity	Song	Score				Total
Date	Celebrity	Song	RR	JL	MC	GS	Total
December 12	Carla & Guillermo	Los Palmeras – "Doble Vida"	8	4	8	9	29
December 12	Laura & Gustavo	Aniceto Molina y Los Sabaneros – "El Campanero"	9	7	8	9	33
December 12	María & Diego	Los Palmeras – "La Chica de Rojo"	10	7	10	10	37
December 12	Ximena & Guido	Aniceto Molina y Los Sabaneros – "Negra Caderona"	9	5	7	9	30

==== Semifinal and Final ====
Semifinal and Final
Date	Couple	Style	Song	Points					
Date	Couple	Style	Song	Reina	Jorge	Moria	Chiche	Gerardo	Result
1st Semifinal (December 19)	Ximena & Guido	Rock and roll	Jerry Lee Lewis — "Great Balls of Fire"		Silver medal		Silver medal	N/A	Gold medal
1st Semifinal (December 19)	María & Diego	Rock and roll	Queen — "Crazy Little Thing Called Love"	Silver medal		Silver medal		N/A	Gold medal
1st Semifinal (December 19)	Ximena & Guido	Salsa	Grupo Niche — "La Negra No Quiere"					N/A	
1st Semifinal (December 19)	María & Diego	Salsa	Celia Cruz — "Que le Den Candela"	Silver medal	Silver medal	Silver medal	Silver medal	N/A	Gold medal
2nd Semifinal (December 20)	Carla & Guillermo	Axé music	Terra Samba – "Treme Terra"				Silver medal	N/A	
2nd Semifinal (December 20)	Laura & Gustavo	Axé music	Margareth Menezes – "Dandalunda"	Silver medal	Silver medal	Silver medal		N/A	Gold medal
2nd Semifinal (December 20)	Carla & Guillermo	Cha-cha-cha	Thalía — "Echa Pa' Lante"		Silver medal	Silver medal	Silver medal	N/A	Gold medal
2nd Semifinal (December 20)	Laura & Gustavo	Cha-cha-cha	Jennifer Lopez — "Let's Get Loud"	Silver medal				N/A	
2nd Semifinal (December 20)	Carla & Guillermo	Hip-hop	Usher featuring Lil' Jon and Ludacris — "Yeah!"	Silver medal		Silver medal	Silver medal	N/A	Gold medal
2nd Semifinal (December 20)	Laura & Gustavo	Hip-hop	The Black Eyed Peas — "Pump It"		Silver medal			N/A	
Final (December 21)	María & Diego	Disco	Laura Branigan — "Gloria"			Silver medal	Silver medal	Silver medal	Gold medal
Final (December 21)	Carla & Guillermo	Disco	The Trammps — "Disco Inferno"	Silver medal	Silver medal				
Final (December 21)	María & Diego	Swing	Fishbone – "Let the Good Times Roll"			Silver medal	Silver medal		
Final (December 21)	Carla & Guillermo	Swing	The Andrews Sisters – "Bounce Me Brother"	Silver medal	Silver medal			Silver medal	Gold medal
Final (December 21)	María & Diego	Merengue	Elvis Crespo – "Suavemente"			Silver medal	Silver medal		
Final (December 21)	Carla & Guillermo	Merengue	Banda XXI – "Esa Chica Tiene Swing"	Silver medal	Silver medal			Silver medal	Gold medal
