= Bailando por un Sueño (Argentine TV series) =

- Genre: Reality competition
- Created by: El Trece
- Presented by: Marcelo Tinelli
- Country of origin: Argentina
- Original language: Spanish
- No. of seasons: 16

Production
- Production locations: El Trece; Ideas del Sur Studios
- Production company: Ideas del Sur Studios

Original release
- Network: El Trece
- Release: 17 April 2006 – present

Related
- El Musical de tus Sueños; Bailando Kids; Soñando por Bailar

Bailando por un Sueño (literally "Dancing for a Dream"; known simply as Bailando) is an Argentine dance competition television series that premiered on 17 April 2006, on El Trece. It is the Argentine version of the British reality TV competition Strictly Come Dancing and is part of the Dancing with the Stars franchise. The show is hosted by Marcelo Tinelli.

The format of the program changed over time. Originally, the format of the show consisted of a celebrity paired with an amateur dancer called dreamer. They had to demonstrate their skills in various styles in order to fulfill the amateur dancer's dream. Since season 5, nevertheless, the show consists of a celebrity paired with a professional dancer, representing a charity. Several dreamers of early seasons came back as professionals in later years.

Unlike other international versions, the show airs four times a week. This means the couples dance a single style per round and the whole process takes several episodes to complete.

== Cast ==
=== Hosts ===
Marcelo Tinelli has been the host since the program's premiere in 2006. Currently, Marcela Feudale, Raúl «Larry» DeClay, Jorge «Carna» Crivelli and Walter «Chino» D'Angelo. Accredited as announcers, these accompany Tinelli in each broadcast. They interact with Tinelli and add live comedy experiences, often adding laughter or amusing comments during the show. Using the voice-over resource.

=== Judging panel ===
The judging panel has included several stars of the Argentine entertainment scene. For the first five seasons, it consisted of four members. In season 6, the judging panel added a member. In season 8, increased to six judges. Halfway through this season the judge Antonio Gasalla withdrew from the program, returning to there being five judges. Since the 9th season, and until now, the panel members are again four. The show also stars guest judges when the official ones are not available. From the thirteenth season, the BAR (Bailando Assistant Referee) is incorporated. Its primary function is to evaluate the technique. In the fourteenth season, his function focused more on the choreographic level than on technique.

Key
Judge
Guest judge(s)
Contestant (Celebrity)
Professional dancer
Choreographer
Judge resigned
BAR

Judge(s)	Seasons														
Judge(s)	1	2	3	4	5	6	7	8	9	10	11	12	13	14	15
Ángel de Brito															
Carolina "Pampita" Ardohaín															
Jimena Barón															
Hernán Piquín															
Lourdes Sánchez													(Note: Lourdes Sánchez, in addition to participating as a member of the BAR, also competed as a participant with Diego Ramos. He entered the competition as a replacement for Macarena Rinaldi.)		
Mariela Anchipi															
Jorge Moliniers															
Florencia Peña															
Marcelo Polino															
Laura Fernández															
Moria Casán						(Note: During the sixth season Moria Casán participated as a guest judge, replacing the main judges. From 17th round he became the chief judge, taking the place of Carmen Barbieri.)									
Soledad Silveyra															
Nacha Guevara															
Aníbal Pachano															
Carmen Barbieri						(Note: She left her place in the 17th round, so she was replaced by Moria Casán for the rest of the season.)	(Note: She left her place in the 2nd round, so she was replaced by Marcelo Polino for the rest of the season. Later, she returned to take the place of Graciela Alfano.)								
Flavio Mendoza															
Graciela Alfano							(Note: She left her place in the 11th round, so she was replaced by Carmen Barbieri, who returned after resigning, for the rest of the season. Later, Graciela Alfano returns as temporary replacement for Carmen Barbieri, her replacement, at the 20th and 21st rounds.)								
Reina Reech															
Ricardo Fort (†)															
Gerardo Sofovich (†)															
Jorge Lafauci															
Laura Fidalgo															
Zulma Faiad															
Antonio Gasalla								(Note: He left his place at the 10th round. After its abandonment, the production decided to maintain the panel of judges with five members.)							

Guest judges
Judge(s)	Seasons													
Judge(s)	1	2	3	4	5	6	7	8	9	10	11	12	13	14
Nicole Neumann														
Griselda Siciliani														(Note: Griselda Siciliani participated as a contestant until the eleventh round, since in the twelfth round he left the contest for work and personal reasons. Although later he returned to the program, in the fifteenth round, to temporarily replace judge Carolina "Pampita" Ardohaín.)
Paula Chaves														
Lizy Tagliani														
Florencia de la V														
Lali Espósito														
Lolo Rossi														
María Vázquez														
Mariana Fabbiani														
Beto Casella														
Jean François Casanovas (†)														
Eleonora Cassano														
Santiago Bal (†)														
Silvina Escudero														
Hugo Ávila														
Luis Ventura														
Chiche Gelblung														
Diego Maradona														

== Series overview ==
Season	Couples	Duration dates	Partners in the finals	
Season	Couples	Duration dates	First place	Second place
1	8	17 April – 1 June 2006	Carmen Barbieri & Cristian Ponce	Dady Brieva & Mirtha Lima
2	12	3 July – 25 September 2006	Florencia de la V & Manuel Rodríguez	Emilia Attías & Lucas Tortorici
3	15	2 October – 21 December 2006	Carla Conte & Guillermo Conforte	María Vázquez & Diego Bogado
4	32	16 April – 6 November 2007	Celina Rucci & Matías Sayago	Paula Robles & Franco Tabenero
5	40	14 April – 11 December 2008	Pampita & Nicolás Armengol	Laura Fidalgo & Miguel Brandán
Kids	15	7 May – 19 June 2009	Pedro Maurizi & Candela Rodríguez	Facundo Pérez & Juliana Mansilla
Musical	22	24 August – 17 December 2009	Silvina Escudero & team	Ricardo Fort & team
6	31	4 May – 20 December 2010	Mole Moli & Mariana Conci	Paula Chaves & Franco Tabernero
7	36	16 May – 22 December 2011	Hernán Piquín & Noelia Pompa	Tito Speranza & Nadia Hair
8	29	11 June – 22 December 2012	Hernán Piquín & Noelia Pompa	Magdalena Bravi & Jorge Moliniers
9	23	28 April – 19 December 2014	Anita Martínez & Bicho Gómez	Hernán Piquín & Cecilia Figaredo
10	27	11 May – 21 December 2015	Federico Bal & Laurita Fernández	Ailén Bechara & Fernando Bertona
11	26	30 May – 19 December 2016	Peter Alfonso & Florencia Vigna	Ezequiel Cwirkaluk & Bárbara Silenzi
12	28	29 May – 18 December 2017	Florencia Vigna & Gonzalo Gerber	Federico Bal & Laurita Fernández
13	21	3 September – 20 December 2018	Julián Serrano & Sofía Morandi	Jimena Barón & Mauro Caiazza
14	26	29 April – 16 December 2019	Nicolás Occhiato & Florencia Jazmín Peña	Florencia Vigna & Facundo Mazzei
—	24	2020	Cancelled	
Academia	23	17 May – 10 December 2021	Noelia Marzol & Jonathan Lazarte	Agustín Sierra & Fiorella Giménez

== Scoring and voting procedure ==
The scoring begins with the judges' marks. Each judge gives a numeric score from 0 to 10. (from the season 10 onwards; previously the lowest score possible was 1). The number of judges has changed between four and six members, so the highest score has varied from 40 to 60. In each round a different judge gets the "secret score", which isn't revealed until all the couples have performed. At the end of each round, with the secret score revealed, the lowest scored couples are sent to a Duel. In the Duel, the couples must perform the same dance again and the judges will determine which couples will advance to the next round until only two couples remain. Then, the audience must vote for one of the bottom two couples via text messages. In the first three seasons, the lowest two scored couples were sent directly to the public vote.

The process is repeated several times until the final five couples are sent directly to a Duel with a new dance style. Then, The final four are divided randomly in two Semifinals where they will compete to advance to the Season Finale. In the Semifinals, three or four previously performed dances are shown again to the judges. They will cast a vote for one of the two couples. At the same time, the audience send text messages and the total is added to the judge's vote. When the final two couples are decided, the same process repeats in the Season Finale.

In the first four seasons, the show fulfilled the winner's dream. From the season 5 onwards, the winner's chosen charity receives money that varies depending on the needs.

Generally, all the celebrities help their chosen charity by featuring events to fundraise money no matter the fact if they succeed in the show or not.

== General information ==
=== Withdrawals ===
The first person to withdraw from competition was La Hiena Barrios in season four and José María Listorti replaced him. Later in the same season and after an injury, Catherine Fulop started crying on air stating that the judges "were being too harsh on her" and that "her efforts at dancing weren't valued enough". She never came back and Cinthia Fernández took her place only a few rounds before the Season Finale.

In season five, Ilona Staller withdrew from the competition after the first round citing a rib fracture, so Adabel Guerrero replaced her. Later, in round 24, Evangelina Anderson left the competition after dancing pregnant during several performances. Eliana Guercio replaced her, but resigned after a single performance in the show. Finally, Claudia Fernández took her place only to get eliminated after one performance.

In season six, Luciana Salazar left the competition after she got anemia, so Vanina Escudero took her place. Later, the returning Evangelina Anderson resigned to the show again citing that she missed her husband in Germany. Belén Francese, who had got eliminated in that round, was given the chance to return in the place of Evangelina.

In season seven, a total of five couples resigned to the show, making it one of the seasons where most people have quit. Mike Tyson and Pamela Anderson resigned in the first rounds stating that they couldn't travel to Argentina each time they had to perform. Jorge Luengo and Paula Chaves replaced them respectively. Later, Wanda Nara left the show after getting pregnant, being replaced by her sister Zaira the rest of the show. In round 6, Rocío Guirao fainted in the middle of her performance. She later admitted she wasn't feeling well during the rehearsals and decided to leave the show. Evangelina Anderson returned for the third time to replace her. Finally, Vanina Escudero left the show after several arguments with the judges and Sofía Pachano replaced her.

In season eight, Sergio Martínez left the competition in round 2, being replaced by Alexander Caniggia. Also, after several problems with her partner, Valeria Archimó resigned and Adabel Guerrero took her place. At last, Liz Solari left the show after receiving an offer to star in a film and Alexandra Larsson took her place.

In season nine, Paula Chaves left the show stating she wanted to spend more time with her daughter after participating in two seasons in a row. As she was participating with her husband, the production decided to pair him with the professional dancer Florencia Viterbo.

In season ten, quitting couples are automatically eliminated and don't receive a replacement. Former winner Anita Martínez left the show stating problems with her partner. Later, Negro Álvarez decided to leave saying that the "format of the show wasn't for him". Finally, former winner and judge, Carmen Barbieri resigned to the show for the third time in a row after quitting in seasons five and six as a judge.

In season eleven, producers decided to continue with previous season politic to not replace withdrawn couples. However, they were forced to do so later in the show because this was the season where most celebrities resigned. Before the show started in 30 May, Bárbara Vélez announced she wouldn't participate after an alleged scandal of domestic violence against her by her ex-boyfriend, Federico Bal, winner of season ten, who would also participate in the show. In round 2, singer Alejandro Lerner left the show alleging that he was "too busy preparing his new album" and couldn't attend to the rehearsals. One rund after that, Fabián Doman resigned to the show because he "felt he couldn't give much more to the show", saying that he wasn't good at dancing at all. In round 6, Martín Liberman left the show because he "wasn't feeling happy with the jury's treatment over him". Finally, Agustín Casanova and his producer Fernando Vázquez both resigned to the show to tour the country with his respective bands in round 9. After this, producers decided to include new celebrities in order to replace the ones who had resigned. Carla Conte, winner of season three; Anita Martínez and Bicho Gómez, winners of season nine, Nicole Neumann and Lizy Tagliani were the chosen ones to replace quitting couples. Alongside, Bárbara Vélez decided to return to the competition.

=== Disqualifications ===
In season eleven, producers decided to disqualify singer Marta Sánchez after she didn't show up to the show the day she had to perform.
