= Carmen Barbieri =

Argentine actress (born 1955)

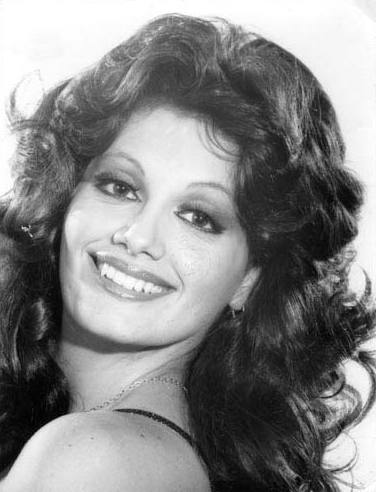
- Born: Carmen Luz Barbieri; 21 April 1955 (age 71); Buenos Aires, Argentina
- Occupation: Actress

Carmen Luz Barbieri (born 21 April 1955) is an Argentine actress, dancer, stand-up comedian, theatre director, tv host and producer. Barbieri was the first winner of Showmatch's Bailando 2006 (paired with professional dancer, Christian Ponce).

== Early life ==
Carmen Barbieri is the daughter of comedian Alfredo Barbieri and granddaughter of guitarist Guillermo Barbieri. She is of African descent.

== Career ==
In 1976 she made her film debut in La guerra de los sostenes. The same year she starred in La aventura explosiva. In 1978 she acted in the movie Con mi mujer no pudo and the telenovela Un mundo de veinte asientos, and the following year in El rey de los exhortos, Las muñecas que hacen ¡pum!, Expertos en pinchazos and Hotel de señoritas. In 1980, Barbieri worked on Los superagentes contra todos. In 1985 she appeared with Guillermo Francella in the film El Telo y la Tele. Her last movie was Las Colegialas (1986).

In 1985 Barbieri appeared on the TV show Mesa de Noticias. In 1987 she acted in the series Matrimonios y algo más. In 1992 she conducted Ta Te Show and in 1994 La Revista del Domingo. In 1996 she acted in the series Como pan caliente along with model Claudia Albertario. In 1997 part of the series Cebollitas. The following year she led the program Movete. She joined journalist Marcelo Polino after Georgina Barbarossa ceded her post.

In 2003 led by America 2, she appeared on Cómplices y testigos and 2005 starred in the sitcom ¿Quién es el jefe? with Gianella Neyra and Nicolás Vázquez. In 2006 Barbieri participated in the segment Showmatch Bailando por un sueño, triumphing in the competition.

In the summer 2006 – 2007 she worked in theater and starred in a confrontation with Moria Casan. In 2007 she again competed on Bailando por un sueño. She was eliminated in the tenth week of milonga and while appearing on América network on the morning show El diario de Carmen. She appeared in the play Incomparable with Miguel Angel Cherutti, Celina Rucci and cast on Teatro Neptuno of Mar del Plata. She was a member of the jury of Bailando por un sueño 2008. In 2009 a member of the jury of Bailando por un Sueño Kids with Laura Fidalgo, Reina Reech and Miguel Angel Cherutti. She was recently starring in Bravísima and was again on the jury of Bailando por un sueño 2011. In 2011 she appeared again in theatre show Barbierísima.

== Filmography ==
Films
Year	Title
1976	La guerra de los sostenes
1976	La aventura explosiva
1978	Con mi mujer no puedo
1979	Expertos en pinchazos
1979	El rey de los exhortos
1979	Las muñecas que hacen pum
1979	Hotel de señoritas
1980	Los Superagentes contra todos
1985	El telo y la tele
1986	Las colegialas

== Theatre ==
Obra
Year	Title
1976	Los verdes estan en el Maipo
1978	La revista de Champagne
1980	Los años locos del Tabarís
1981	¡Verdisssima! 81
1985	Taxi
1989	Increiblemente Juntos
2002	Acaloradas
2003	Obvio!
2004	Money Money
2007	Irresistible, otra historia de humor
2008	Incomparable, el humor continua
2009	Vedettisima
2010	Fantastica
2011	Bravísima
2012	Barbierísima

== Awards ==
Award	Year	Category
Martín Fierro	1997	Best Host
Estrella de Mar	2007	Best Actress
Estrella de Mar	2008	Best Actress
Estrella de Mar	2009	Best Actress

Preceded by None	Bailando Por un Sueño (Argentina) Winner; Season 1 (April – June 2006)	Succeeded by Florencia De La V
