= María Eugenia Ritó =

Argentine vedette (born 1975)

- Born: María Eugenia Rita; 3 June 1975 (age 50); San Juan, Argentina
- Occupations: Vedette, dancer, model, media personality
- Spouse: Marcelo Salinas (2006–2013)

María Eugenia Rita (born 3 June 1975), better known by her stage name María Eugenia Ritó, is an Argentine dancer and vedette.

== Career ==
María Eugenia began her career in 1995 in Petardos and Polémica en el Bar with Gerardo Sofovich; later she performed as a stewardess in the telenovela Amor Latino. On stage, she has participated in successful seasons with Antonio Gasalla, Nito Artaza, Zulma Faiad, El Negro Alvarez and Tristán, and has acted in theatre productions produced by Gerardo Sofovich such as Soltero y con Dos Viudas (along with Iliana Calabró and Ana Acosta) and Petardos del Humor in Villa Carlos Paz and in Avenida Corrientes, Buenos Aires with Jorge Corona. In 2006, she participated in the second season of Bailando por un Sueño which reached the semifinals and participated in Bailando por un Sueño 2007 replacing Juana Repetto. In 2008, she starred in the musical comedy El Show de las Divorciadas and in the summer of 2008-2009, she was first vedette with Silvina Luna in Vedettísima, headed by Carmen Barbieri. In early 2009, she was on the cover of Playboy magazine and participated in El Musical de tus Sueños, and in 2011 she was in Bailando 2011.

== Personal life ==
On September 29, 2006, she married Marcelo Salinas in the halls of the Sociedad Rural Argentina.

== Filmography ==
=== Television ===
- Petardos (1999)
- Amor Latino (2000)
- Polémica en el Bar (2001)
- Matrimonios y Algo Más (2001)
- Son Amores (2002)
- Poné a Francella (2002)
- Playboy TV (2002)
- Malandras (2002–2003)
- Rebelde Way (2002)
- Durmiendo con mi jefe (2003)
- Costumbres Argentinas (2003)
- Los Pensionados (2004)
- Casados con Hijos (2005)
- ShowMatch (guest - 2005)
- Bailando por un Sueño 2 (2006)
- Bailando por un Sueño 2007
- No hay 2 sin 3 (2006)
- Socias (2008)
- El Musical de tus Sueños (2009)
- Bailando 2011 (2011)
- Bailando 2014 (2014)

=== Theater ===
- Petardos del Humor (2000)
- Divertidísimo (2000)
- Destino de gloria (2004)
- Argentina todo un show (2004)
- El viaje del humor (2005)
- Soltero y con dos viudas (2005)
- Operacio Ja Ja Recargada (2006)
- Hirientes (2007)
- El Show de las divorciadas (2008)
- Vedettisima (2009)
- Music Hall en Teatro Nogaró de Punta del Este (2009)
- Primera dama se busca (2010)
- La Revista de Buenos Aires (2011)
