= Bailando 2014 =

- Season 2014
- The cast of Bailando 2014
- Presented by: Marcelo Tinelli

Release
- Original network: El Trece
- Original release: April 28 – December 19, 2014

Season chronology
- ← Previous; Bailando 2012 Next → Bailando 2015

Bailando 2014 was the ninth Argentinian season of Bailando por un Sueño. The season premiere was on April 28, 2014, hosted by Marcelo Tinelli. 28 couples competed.

The jury was reduced from six to four members in this season: returning judges Marcelo Polino and Moria Casán, joined by Soledad Silveyra and Nacha Guevara. Additionally, two former judges (Aníbal Pachano and Laura Fidalgo) are competitors in this season.

Norma Pons was to be part of the event, but due to a heart attack died on April 29. A day earlier, in the opening of the show, her last work for television was, where did Mirta, aunt of Marcelo Tinelli. Finally her sister Mimi Pons was chosen to replace her in the contest.

Comedians Anita Martínez and Marcos "Bicho" Gómez were revealed on December 19 as the winners over Hernán Piquín and Cecilia Figaredo with 59.42% of the public vote.

== Couples ==
Celebrity	Notability	Professional Partner	Status
Paula Chaves	TV Presenter	–	Withdrew
Victoria Saravia	Model	Gonzalo Gerber	Eliminated 1st by the 48.03%
Evelyn von Brocke	Journalist	Fernando Bertona	Eliminated 2nd by the 40.22%
Mimí Pons	Actress	Pablo Juin	Eliminated 3rd by the 40.86%
Yanina Latorre	TV Personality	Jorge Moliniers	Eliminated 4th by the 35.30%
Martín Liberman	Journalist	Ana Laura López	Eliminated 5th by the 48.66%
Karina Jelinek	Model	Maximiliano D'Iorio	Eliminated 6th by the 38.66%
Matías Alé	Actor and Comedian	Sabrina Ravelli	Eliminated 7th by the 48.15%
Matías Alé	Model	Sabrina Ravelli	Eliminated 7th by the 48.15%
Miriam Lanzoni	Actress	Maximiliano D'Iorio	Eliminated 8th by the 40.14%
Maximiliano Guerra	Professional dancer	Patricia Baca Urquiza	Eliminated 9th by the 33.52%
Victoria Xipolitakis	TV Personality	Cristian Falcón	Eliminated 10th by the 18.30%
Luciano Tirri	Musician Marcelo Tinelli's cousin	Bárbara Really	Eliminated 11th by the 33.71%
Mariana Antoniale	TV Personality	Cristian Ponce	Eliminated 12th by the 46.49%
María Eugenia Ritó	Vedette	Fernando Bertona^{[a]}	Eliminated 13th by the 49.41%
Fátima Floréz^{[f]}	Comedian	Freddy Villarreal	Eliminated 14th by the 49.71%
Fátima Floréz^{[f]}	Comedian	Freddy Villarreal	Eliminated 14th by the 49.71%
Sixto Valdés^{[e]}	Stylist	Mariana Limeres	Eliminated 15th by the 31.56%
Rosmery González^{[f]}	Dancer	Patricio Sauc	Eliminated 16th by the 22.11%
Lizy Tagliani^{[d]}	Comedian	Gabriel Usandivaras	Eliminated 17th by the 43.09%
Mora Godoy	Professional dancer	Marcos Ayala	Eliminated 18th by the 40.06%
Anibal Pachano	Theatre Director	Laura Fernández	Eliminated 19th by the 48.17%
Diego Reinhold	Actor	Lourdes Sánchez	Eliminated 20th by the 30.48%
Eleonora Cassano	Professional dancer	Pablo Juin	Eliminated 21st by the 33.64%
Laura Fidalgo	Professional dancer	Martín Pico	Eliminated 22nd by the production decision
Pedro Alfonso	Actor	Florencia Viterbo^{[b]}	Eliminated 23rd by the 48.29%
Jésica Cirio	Model	Juan Carlos Acosta	Semifinalists by the 29.54%
Noelia Pompa	TV Personality	Facundo Mazzei	Semifinalists by the 27.12%
Hernán Piquín	Professional dancer	Cecilia Figaredo	Runners-up by the 40.58%
Hernán Piquín	Professional dancer	Cecilia Figaredo	Runners-up by the 40.58%
Anita Martínez	Comedian	Marcos "Bicho" Gómez	Winners by the 59.42%
Anita Martínez	Comedian	Marcos "Bicho" Gómez	Winners by the 59.42%

- ^[a] Emanuel González was the original partner, but he left the competition after Cumbia's round.
- ^[b] Paula Chaves left the competition, and professional partner Florencia Viterbo entered in her place.
- ^[d] Lizy Tagliani enters the competition after round 8.
- ^[e] Sixto Javier Valdés enters the competition after round 12.
- ^[f] Rosmery González and Fátima Flórez enters the competition after round 14

== Scoring chart ==
Couple	Place	01	02	03	04	05	06	07	08	09	10	11	12	13	14	15	16	17	18	19	20	21	22	23	Semifinals		Final
Couple	Place	01	02	03	04	05	06	07	08	09	10	11	12	13	14	15	16	17	18	19	20	21	22	23	1	2	Final
Anita & Bicho	1	34	33	30	40	35	39	34	33	21	31	23	28	28	14	30	34	36	26	33	35	25	81	SAFE		6	7
Hernán & Cecilia	2	37	40	36	37	40	38	38	32	23	31	40	38	37	38	35	27	40	33	28	28	25	81	SAFE	6		2
Noelia	3/4	35	26	37	39	38	34	35	39	31	33	30	33	38	40	35	31	29	37	32	36	37	81	SAFE		3	
Jésica	3/4	28	32	33	35	29	33	23	36	31	24	23	35	28	24	31	24	36	26	28	28	32	65	SAFE	2		
Peter	5	26	32	25	27	33	30	29	23	21	24	34	34	28	34	29	35	31	32	33	31	40	86	ELIM			
Laura	6	31	36	37	30	36	36	38	36	32	24	40	28	35	36	36	27	34	32	32	33	37	74				
Eleonora	7	30	35	36	30	39	40	38	39	25	28	17	28	36	24	36	33	31	33	23	28	32					
Diego	8	27	30	27	32	31	30	29	34	28	29	32	24	30	24	31	34	31	36	32	23						
Aníbal	9	22	35	31	28	31	38	34	33	23	29	31	19	34	30	31	27	34	26	*							
Mora	10	35	33	28	34	30	31	23	38	33	32	35	33	38	31	40	33	26	32								
Lizy	11								33	21	24	30	28	28	24	30	24	31									
Rosmery	12														37	25	24										
Sixto	13												34	30	33	25											
Fatima & Freddy	14														30												
M. Eugenia	15	25	12	25	25	27	31	23	23	23	28	32	31	17													
Mariana	16	25	24	30	32	24	30	37	33	21	30	31	24														
Luciano	17	18	18	21	25	31	18	15	23	14	18	17															
Victoria.X	18	16	23	25	30	27	18	29	19	21	18																
Maximiliano	19	31	34	31	27	29	32	34	34	23																	
Miriam	20	25	21	31	34	37	21	35	30																		
Matías & Sabrina	21	20	18	29	21	24	21	23																			
Karina	22	27	26	27	21	27	30																				
Martín	23	23	21	26	28	29																					
Yanina	24	18	*	17	25																						
Mimí.P	25	37	28	21																							
Evelyn	26	16	21																								
Victoria.S	27	19																									
Paula	N/A	26																									

Red numbers indicate the lowest score for each week.
Green numbers indicate the highest score for each week.
indicates the couple eliminated that week.
indicates the couple was saved by the public or production.
indicates the couple was saved by the jury.
indicates the couple withdrew.
indicates the winning couple.
indicates the runner-up couple.
indicates the semifinalists couples.

- In round 2, Yanina Latorre was sentenced because she stopped her routines in the middle of the choreography.
- In round 19, Anibal Pachano was sentenced because he had a fight with judge Moria Casan before the dance, refused to do the choreography and decided to go to the telephone vote.

=== Highest and lowest scoring performances ===
The best and worst performances in each dance according to the judges' marks are as follows:

Dance	Best dancer(s)	Best score	Worst dancer(s)	Worst score
Disco	Hernán Piquín & Cecilia Figaredo; Mimí Pons	37	Victoria Xipolitakis; Evelyn von Brocke	16
Ballet	Hernán Piquín & Cecilia Figaredo	40	María Eugenia Ritó	12
Street dance	Laura Fidalgo; Noelia Pompa	37	Yanina Latorre	17
Argentine cumbia	Anita Martinez & Bicho Gómez	40	Karina Jelinek; Matías Alé & Sabrina Ravelli	21
Music video	Hernán Piquín & Cecilia Figaredo	40	Matías Alé & Sabrina Ravelli; Mariana "Loly" Antoniale	24
Adagio	Eleonora Cassano	40	Luciano Tirri; Victoria Xipolitakis	18
Cuarteto	Eleonora Cassano; Hernan Piquin & Cecilia Figaredo; Laura Fidalgo	38	Luciano Tirri	15
Freestyle dance	Eleonora Cassano; Noelia Pompa	39	Victoria Xipolitakis	19
Synchronization	Mora Godoy	33	Luciano Tirri	14
Folk music	Noelia Pompa	33	Luciano Tirri; Victoria Xipolitakis	18
Salsa	Hernan Piquin & Cecilia Figaredo; Laura Fidalgo	40	Eleonora Cassano; Luciano Tirri	17
Heel style	Hernan Piquin & Cecilia Figaredo	38	Aníbal Pachano	19
Bachata	Noelia Pompa; Mora Godoy	38	María Eugenia Ritó	17
Reggaeton	Noelia Pompa	40	Anita Martinez & Bicho Gómez	14
Tango or Milonga	Mora Godoy	40	Sixto Valdés; Rosmery González	25
Rock and roll	Peter Alfonso	35	Rosmery González; Lizy Tagliani; Jésica Cirio	24
Aquadance	Hernan Piquin & Cecilia Figaredo	40	Mora Godoy	26
Merengue	Noelia Pompa	37	Anita Martinez & Bicho Gómez; Aníbal Pachano; Jésica Cirio	26
Latin pop	Pedro Alfonso; Anita Martinez & Bicho Gómez	33	Eleonora Cassano	23
Arabic music	Noelia Pompa	36	Diego Reinhold	23
K-pop	Pedro Alfonso	40	Hernan Piquín & Cecilia Figaredo; Anita Martinez & Bicho Gómez	25
Flamenco Electro dance	Pedro Alfonso	86	Jésica Cirio	65

== Styles, scores and songs ==
Secret vote is in bold text.

=== April ===
Disco
Date	Couple	Style	Song	Score				Total
Date	Couple	Style	Song	Nacha	Moria	Soledad	Marcelo	Total
April 29	Eleonora & Nicolás	Disco	Gloria Estefan – "Turn The Beat Around"	8	**8**	9	5	30
April 29	Aníbal & Laura	Disco	Kylie Minogue – "Celebration"	6	**6**	6	4	22

=== May ===
Disco, Ballet and Street dance
Date	Couple	Style	Song	Score				Total
Date	Couple	Style	Song	Nacha	Moria	Soledad	Marcelo	Total
May 1	Maximiliano & Patricia	Disco	Maroon 5 feat. Christina Aguilera – "Moves like Jagger"	8	**8**	10	5	31
May 1	Victoria & Cristian	Disco	Daft Punk – "One More Time"	1	**8**	5	2	16
May 1	Noelia & Facundo	Disco	Atomic Kitten – "Ladies' Night"	9	**10**	9	7	35
May 1	Martín & Ana Laura	Disco	OG Bulldog – "Balboa Anthem"	6	**5**	8	4	23
May 5	Paula & Peter	Disco	Daft Punk feat. Pharrell Williams – "Get Lucky"	7	**6**	8	5	26
May 5	Yanina & Jorge	Disco	Lady Gaga – "Bad Romance" (Remix)	5	**6**	4	3	18
May 6	Loly & Cristian	Disco	Gloria Gaynor – "Can't Take My Eyes Off Of You"	6	**7**	8	4	25
May 6	Evelyn & Fernando	Disco	Scissor Sisters – "Any Which Way"	4	**9**	2	1	16
May 8	Hernán & Cecilia	Disco	Bruno Mars – "Treasure" (Remix)	10	**10**^{[j1]}	10	7	37
May 8	Karina & Maximiliano	Disco	Robin Thicke feat. T.I. and Pharrell Williams – "Blurred Lines (Will Sparks Remix)"	7	**9**	7	4	27
May 8	Anita & Bicho	Disco	Sandra – "Everlasting Love"	9	**10**	10	5	34
May 9	María Eugenia & Emanuel	Disco	Mika – "Love Today"	7^{[j2]}	**6**	8	4	25
May 9	Jésica & Juan Carlos	Disco	Atomic Kitten – "By with You"	8^{[j2]}	**7**	8	5	28
May 9	Luciano & Bárbara	Disco	Kool & the Gang – "Get Down on It (Eiffel 65 Remix)"	6^{[j2]}	**5**	6	1	18
May 9	Mora & Marcos	Disco	David Guetta ft. Akon – "Sexy Bitch (70s Disco Remix)"	10^{[j2]}	**9**	10	6	35
May 9	Vitto & Gonzalo	Disco	Adele – "Rolling in the Deep" (Remix)	6^{[j2]}	**5**	7	1	19
May 12	Laura & Martín	Disco	The Pussycat Dolls – "Hush Hush; Hush Hush"	8	**8**	9	6	31
May 12	Matías & Sabrina	Disco	Glee Cast – "Da Ya Think I'm Sexy?"	5	**7**	4	4	20
May 12	Diego & María Lourdes	Disco	Lady Gaga – "Just Dance" (Remix)	6	**7**	9	5	27
May 12	Miriam & Gabriel	Disco	Modjo – "Lady (Hear Me Tonight)"	6	**8**	7	4	25
May 13	Mimí & Pablo	Disco	Kym Mazelle – "Young Hearts Run Free"	10	**10**	10	7	37
May 15	Eleonora & Nicolás	Ballet	Ludwig Minkus – "Don Quixote"	9^{[j2]}	9	**10**	7	35
May 15	Yanina & Jorge	Ballet	Pyotr Ilyich Tchaikovsky – "The Nutcracker"	–	–	–	–	–
May 15	Anita & Bicho	Ballet	Georges Bizet – "Carmen"	10^{[j2]}	10	**8**	5	33
May 15	Martín & Ana Laura	Ballet	Luciano Pavarotti – "Nessun Dorma"	6^{[j2]}	5	**6**	4	21
May 16	Mora & Marcos	Ballet	Pyotr Ilyich Tchaikovsky – "Swan Lake"	9^{[j2]}	9	**10**	5	33
May 16	Victoria & Cristian	Ballet	Pyotr Ilyich Tchaikovsky – "The Sleeping Beauty"	7^{[j2]}	8	**4**	4	23
May 16	Jésica & Juan Carlos	Ballet	Pyotr Ilyich Tchaikovsky – "Swan Lake Ballet Suite Op. 20"	9^{[j2]}	9	**7**	7	32
May 16	Evelyn & Fernando	Ballet	Antonio Vivaldi – "The Four Seasons"	6^{[j2]}	7	**4**	4	21
May 19	Noelia & Facundo	Ballet	Pyotr Ilyich Tchaikovsky – "Piano Concerto No. 1"	8	6	**9**	3	26
May 19	Matías & Sabrina	Ballet	Ludwig van Beethoven – "Symphony No. 9"	5	3	**8**	2	18
May 19	Miriam & Gabriel	Ballet	Pyotr Ilyich Tchaikovsky – "Swan Lake Ballet Suite Op. 20, Act III, No. 21: Spanish Dance"	5	7	**6**	3	21
May 20	Hernán & Cecilia	Ballet	Sergei Rachmaninoff – "Spring Waters"	10	10	**10**	10	40
May 20	María Eugenia & Emanuel	Ballet	Pyotr Ilyich Tchaikovsky – "Swan Lake"	3	3	**5**	1	12
May 20	Luciano & Bárbara	Ballet	Ludwig van Beethoven – "Symphony No. 5"	1	9	**5**	3	18
May 22	Maximiliano & Patricia	Ballet	Georges Bizet – "Toreador Song"	10^{[j2]}	8	**10**	6	34
May 22	Loly & Cristian	Ballet	Giuseppe Verdi – "The Corsair"	7^{[j2]}	6	**6**	5	24
May 22	Peter & Florencia	Ballet	Pyotr Ilyich Tchaikovsky – "Waltz of the Flowers"	8^{[j2]}	10	**8**	6	32
May 23	Karina & Maximiliano	Ballet	Léo Delibes – "Coppélia Act II, No. 14: Scene and Waltz of the Doll"	8^{[j2]}	9	**6**	3	26
May 23	Diego & María Lourdes	Ballet	Pyotr Ilyich Tchaikovsky – "Swan Lake Ballet Suite Op. 20, Act III, No. 23: Mazurka"	9^{[j2]}	8	**8**	5	30
May 23	Aníbal & Laura	Ballet	Wolfgang Amadeus Mozart – "Serenade No. 13"	10^{[j2]}	9	**9**	7	35
May 23	Mimí & Pablo	Ballet	Johann Strauss – "Voices of Spring"	8^{[j2]}	8	**9**	3	28
May 23	Laura & Martín	Ballet	Boris Asafyev – "Flames of Paris"	9^{[j2]}	10	**10**	7	36
May 27	Victoria & Cristian	Street dance	Nicki Minaj – "Pound the Alarm"	5	**7**	8	5	25
May 27	Diego & María Lourdes	Street dance	Justin Bieber feat. Nicki Minaj – "Beauty and a Beat"	7	**9**	6	5	27
May 27	Mora & Marcos	Street dance	Selena Gomez & the Scene – "Hit the Lights"	6	**10**	7	5	28
May 29	Anita & Bicho	Street dance	Maxi Trusso feat. ToMakeNoise – "S.O.S (Same Old Story)"	9^{[j2]}	**8**	10	3	30
May 29	Luciano & Bárbara	Street dance	Avicii – "Wake Me Up"	5^{[j2]}	**7**	6	3	21
May 30	Noelia & Facundo	Street dance	Little Mix – "Wings"	10^{[j2]}	**10**	10	7	37
May 30	Yanina & Emanuel	Street dance	Selena Gomez – "Slow Down"	6^{[j2]}	**5**	4	2	17
May 30	Jésica & Juan Carlos	Street dance	Rihanna feat. Calvin Harris – "We Found Love"	10^{[j2]}	**9**	9	5	33
May 30	Loly & Cristian	Street dance	Cher Lloyd feat. Astro – "Want U Back"	8^{[j2]}	**8**	8	6	30

=== June ===
Street dance, Argentine cumbia and Music video
Date	Couple	Style	Song	Score				Total
Date	Couple	Style	Song	Nacha	Moria	Soledad	Marcelo	Total
June 2	Hernán & Cecilia	Street dance	One Direction – "One Thing"	10	**10**	10	6	36
June 2	Peter & Florencia	Street dance	Carly Rae Jepsen – "Call Me Maybe"	7	**8**	7	3	25
June 2	Maximiliano & Patricia	Street dance	One Direction – "Kiss You"	7	**8**	10	6	31
June 2	Martín & Ana Laura	Street dance	Enrique Iglesias feat. Pitbull – "I'm a Freak"	7	**7**	7	5	26
June 3	Aníbal & Laura	Street dance	Pharrell Williams – "Happy"	8	**8**	10	5	31
June 3	María Eugenia & Gastón	Street dance	Nicki Minaj – "Starships"	6	**6**	7	6	25
June 5	Eleonora & Nicolás	Street dance	Pitbull feat. Kesha – "Timber"	10	**9**	10	7	36
June 5	Karina & Maximiliano	Street dance	Katy Perry – "Part of Me"	6	**8**	8	5	27
June 5	Miriam & Gabriel	Street dance	Chris Brown – "Don't Wake Me Up"	7	**9**	9	6	31
June 6	Matías & Sabrina	Street dance	One Direction – "Live While We're Young"	8	**7**	8	6	29
June 6	Mimí & Pablo	Street dance	Madonna – "Girl Gone Wild"	7	**4**	7	3	21
June 6	Laura & Martín	Street dance	Rihanna – "Where Have You Been"	9	**10**	10	8	37
June 9	Eleonora & Nicolás	Argentine cumbia	Gilda – "Paisaje"	8	9	**10**	3	30
June 9	Anita & Bicho	Argentine cumbia	Ráfaga – "Mentirosa"	10	10	**10**	10	40
June 10	Martín & Ana Laura	Argentine cumbia	Ráfaga – "Chiquilina"	6	8	**9**	5	28
June 12	Loly & Cristian	Argentine cumbia	Karina – "Corazón Mentiroso"	7^{[j2]}	9	**9**	7	32
June 13	Luciano & Bárbara	Argentine cumbia	Ráfaga – "Agüita"	10^{[j2]}	7	**7**	1	25
June 13	Hernán & Cecilia	Argentine cumbia	La Contra – "Oye el Boom"	10^{[j2]}	10	**10**	7	37
June 13	Victoria & Cristian	Argentine cumbia	Américo – "Te Vas"	8^{[j2]}	10	**7**	5	30
June 13	Diego & María Lourdes	Argentine cumbia	Ráfaga – "La Luna y Tú"	8^{[j2]}	9	**9**	6	32
June 13	Matías & Sabrina	Argentine cumbia	Gilda – "Corazón Valiente"	3^{[j2]}	7	**6**	5	21
June 16	Peter & Florencia	Argentine cumbia	Karina – "Fuera"	6	7	**8**	6	27
June 16	María Eugenia & Gastón	Argentine cumbia	Grupo Play – "Te Quiero"	7	6	**7**	5	25
June 17	Maximiliano & Patricia	Argentine cumbia	Agapornis – "Hasta el Final"	8	8	**8**	3	27
June 17	Jésica & Juan Carlos	Argentine cumbia	Agapornis – "Por Amarte Así"	8	10	**9**	8	35
June 17	Yanina & Jorge	Argentine cumbia	Gilda – "Fuiste"	8	6	**5**	6	25
June 17	Miriam & Gabriel	Argentine cumbia	Grupo Play feat. Vi-Em – "Quiero Verte Bailar"	9	10	**9**	6	34
June 19	Aníbal & Laura	Argentine cumbia	Ráfaga – "Ritmo de Cumbia"	7	8	**7**	6	28
June 19	Karina & Maximiliano	Argentine cumbia	El Villano – "Te Pintaron Pajaritos"	5	6	**7**	3	21
June 19	Laura & Pablo	Argentine cumbia	Gilda – "Se Me Ha Perdido Un Corazón"	7	9	**9**	5	30
June 20	Noelia & Facundo	Argentine cumbia	Agapornis – "Volverte a Ver"	10	10^{[j2]}	**10**	9	39
June 20	Mora & Marcos	Argentine cumbia	Los Palmeras – "Bombón Asesino"	9	8^{[j2]}	**10**	7	34
June 24	Anita & Bicho	Music video	Wisin feat. Jennifer Lopez and Ricky Martin – "Adrenalina"	**9**	10	10	6	35
June 26	Martín & Ana Laura	Music video	Psy – "Gentleman"	**7**^{[j2]}	9	7	6	29
June 27	Noelia & Facundo	Music video	Will.i.am feat. Britney Spears – "Scream and Shout"	**10**^{[j2]}	10	10	8	38
June 27	Victoria & Cristian	Music video	Shakira – "Loca"	**9**^{[j2]}	8	7	3	27
June 27	Luciano & Bárbara	Music video	Psy – "Gangnam Style"	**9**^{[j2]}	9	7	6	31
June 30	Peter & Florencia	Music video	Michael Jackson – "Smooth Criminal"	**10**	10	10	3	33
June 30	Loly & Cristian	Music video	Rihanna – "Only Girl (In the World)"	**6**	7	7	4	24
June 30	Eleonora & Nicolás	Music video	Lady Gaga – "Applause"	**10**	10	10	9	39

=== July ===
Music video, Adagio and Cuarteto
Date	Couple	Style	Song	Score				Total
Date	Couple	Style	Song	Nacha	Moria	Soledad	Marcelo	Total
July 1	Aníbal & Laura	Music video	Madonna – "Vogue"	**7**	9	8	7	31
July 1	Jésica & Juan Carlos	Music video	Jennifer Lopez – "Dance Again"	**7**	8	8	6	29
July 1	Laura & Pablo	Music video	Jennifer Lopez feat. Pitbull – "Ven a Bailar"	**8**	10	10	8	36
July 3	Diego & Lourdes	Music video	Bruno Mars – "Locked Out of Heaven"	**9**^{[j2]}	5^{[j3]}	9	8	31
July 3	Karina & Maxi	Music video	Britney Spears – "Womanizer"	**7**^{[j2]}	9^{[j3]}	8	3	27
July 3	Maximiliano & Patricia	Music video	Lady Gaga – "Judas"	**9**^{[j2]}	5^{[j3]}	8	7	29
July 4	Miriam & Gabriel	Music video	Rihanna – "Don't Stop The Music"	**10**^{[j2]}	10	10	7	37
July 4	Hernan & Cecilia	Music video	Chris Brown – "Turn Up the Music"	**10**^{[j2]}	10	10	10	40
July 4	Maria Eugenia & Fernando	Music video	Britney Spears – "Till the World Ends"	**7**^{[j2]}	6	8	6	27
July 4	Nicolás & Sofía	Music video	Pitbull feat. Christina Aguilera – "Feel This Moment"	**6**^{[j2]}	8	7	3	24
July 7	Mora & Marcos	Music video	Lady Gaga – "Born This Way"	**8**	9	8^{[j3]}	5	30
July 8	Hernán & Cecilia	Adagio	Miley Cyrus – "Wrecking Ball"	9	**10**	10^{[j3]}	9	38
July 8	Anita & Bicho	Adagio	A-ha – "Crying in the Rain"	10	**10**	10^{[j3]}	9	39
July 8	Miriam & Maximiliano	Adagio	Toni Braxton – "Un-Break My Heart"	8	**8**	4^{[j3]}	1	21
July 10	Victoria & Cristian	Adagio	Guns N' Roses – "November Rain"	8^{[j2]}	**3**^{[j3]}	5	2	18
July 10	Maximiliano & Patricia	Adagio	Robbie Williams – "Angels"	10^{[j2]}	**4**^{[j3]}	10	8	32
July 11	Diego & Lourdes	Adagio	Bryan Adams – "(Everything I Do) I Do It for You"	10^{[j2]}	**10**	5^{[j3]}	5	30
July 11	Luciano & Bárbara	Adagio	George Michael – "Careless Whisper"	8^{[j2]}	**5**	3^{[j3]}	2	18
July 11	Mariana & Cristian	Adagio	Christina Aguilera feat. Blake Shelton – "Just a Fool"	10^{[j2]}	**8**	5^{[j3]}	7	30
July 14	Noelia & Facundo	Adagio	Pink feat. Nate Ruess – "Just Give Me a Reason"	8	**9**	9	8	34
July 14	Mora & Marcos	Adagio	Whitney Houston – "I Will Always Love You"	7	**10**	7	7	31
July 15	Pedro & Florencia	Adagio	Adele – "Someone like You"	9	**9**	9	3	30
July 17	Anibal & Laura	Adagio	Bruno Mars – "When I Was Your Man"	10	**10**	10	8	38
July 17	Karina/Mimi & Maximiliano	Adagio	Debbie Gibson – "Lost in Your Eyes"	8	**7**	8	7	30
July 17	Laura & Martín	Adagio	Mariah Carey – "Without You"	9	**10**	9	8	36
July 18	M. Eugenia & Fernando	Adagio	Duran Duran – "Ordinary World"	8	**8**	8	7	31
July 18	Jésica & Juan Carlos	Adagio	Glee – "Total Eclipse of the Heart"	9	**9**	10	5	33
July 18	Eleonora & Pablo	Adagio	Celine Dion – "The Power of Love"	10	**10**^{[j2]}	10	10	40
July 21	Matías & Sabrina	Adagio	Prince – "Purple Rain"	6	**6**	7	2	21
July 24	Noelia & Facundo	Cuarteto	Banda XXI – "Déjame Llorar"	9^{[j4]}	10^{[j2]}	**9**	7	35
July 25	Hernán & Cecilia	Cuarteto	Rodrigo – "Fuego y Pasión"	10^{[j4]}	10	**10**	8	38
July 25	Victoria & Cristian	Cuarteto	Walter Olmos – "No Me Mientas"	7^{[j4]}	8	**9**	5	29
July 25	Mora & Marcos	Cuarteto	Rodrigo – "Ocho Cuarenta"	1^{[j4]}	9	**8**	5	23
July 28	Pedro & Florencia	Cuarteto	La Konga – "Quieren Matar al Ladrón"	8	8	**9**	4	29
July 28	M. Eugenia & Fernando	Cuarteto	Rodrigo – "Amor Clasificado"	6	6	**8**	3	23
July 28	Matías & Sabrina	Cuarteto	Rodrigo – "Qué Ironía"	5	6	**8**	4	23
July 29	Anibal & Laura	Cuarteto	Banda XXI – "Cuando Me Enamoro"	9	9	**9**	7	34
July 31	Magdalena & Jorge	Cuarteto	La Mona Jiménez – "El Agite"	10^{[j2]}	6^{[j3]}	**10**	8	34
July 31	Luciano & Bárbara	Cuarteto	Rodrigo – "Soy Cordobés"	4^{[j2]}	3^{[j3]}	**7**	1	15

=== August ===
Cuarteto, Freestyle, Synchronization and Folk music
Date	Couple	Style	Song	Score				Total
Date	Couple	Style	Song	Nacha	Moria	Soledad	Marcelo	Total
August 1	Eleonora & Pablo	Cuarteto	La Mona Jiménez – "El Bum Bum"	10^{[j2]}	10	**10**	8	38
August 1	Diego & Lourdes	Cuarteto	Rodrigo – "Lo Mejor del Amor"	7^{[j2]}	10	**7**	5	29
August 1	Lizy & Cristian	Cuarteto	Rodrigo – "Cómo Olvidarla"	10^{[j2]}	10	**10**	7	37
August 1	Miriam & Maximiliano	Cuarteto	Walter Olmos – "Amor Fugitivo"	10^{[j2]}	10	**9**	6	35
August 4	Jésica & Juan Carlos	Cuarteto	Walter Olmos – "Por Lo Que Yo Te Quiero"	7	5	**8**	3	23
August 5	Anita & Bicho	Cuarteto	Banda XXI – "Pasame La Botella"	8	9	**9**	8	34
August 5	Laura & Martín	Cuarteto	Walter Olmos – "Soy Un Adicto a Tí"	9	10	**10**	9	38
August 8	Noelia & Facundo	Freestyle	Abel Pintos – "Sin Principio Ni Final"	10^{[j2]}	**10**^{[j3]}	10	9	39
August 8	Victoria & Cristian	Freestyle	Xuxa – "Todo El Mundo Esta Feliz"	8^{[j2]}	**1**^{[j3]}	7	3	19
August 8	Luciano & Bárbara	Freestyle	Gloria Gaynor – "I Will Survive" / The Weather Girls – "It's Raining Men"	6^{[j2]}	**1**^{[j3]}	8	8	23
August 11	Pedro & Florencia	Freestyle	DJ Sanny J feat. Ruly MC – "Fiesta Reggaeton"	7	**3**	10	3	23
August 11	Hernán & Cecilia	Freestyle	The Beatles – "Come Together / I Want You (She's So Heavy) / Let It Be / All You Need Is Love"	8	**10**	10	4	32
August 11	Diego & Lourdes	Freestyle	John Williams – "Star Wars (Main Title)" / Tiësto – "Mission: Impossible – Theme" / John Williams – "Indiana Jones Theme Song" / John Williams – "Journey to The Island (Remix)" / Bernard Herrmann – "Prelude Psycho" / Ray Parker Jr. – "Ghostbusters" / The John Barry Orchestra – "James Bond Theme" / John Williams – "Flying Theme" / Celine Dion – "My Heart Will Go On" / Robbie Williams – "Beyond the Sea" / John Williams – "Jaws Theme" / Charles Hazlewood – "Superman" / The Righteous Brothers – "Unchained Melody"	8	**8**	10	8	34
August 12	M. Eugenia & Fernando	Freestyle	Christina Aguilera – "Candyman"	7	**3**	8	5	23
August 12	Anibal & Laura	Freestyle	Liza Minnelli – "All That Jazz" (intro) / The Hit Co. – "Hot Honey Rag"	9	**8**	8	8	33
August 12	Laura & Martín	Freestyle	Jennifer Lopez – "Ain't It Funny" / Bebe – "Malo"	8	**10**	9	9	36
August 12	Miriam & Maximiliano	Freestyle	Evanescence – "Bring Me to Life / Call Me When You're Sober"	9	**9**	9	3	30
August 15	Eleonora & Pablo	Freestyle	Liza Minnelli – "Money Money / New York, New York"	10^{[j2]}	**10**	10	9	39
August 15	Mariana & Cristian	Freestyle	Jennifer Lopez – "Quimbara / La Vida Es Un Carnaval / Bemba Colora"	9^{[j2]}	**8**	9	7	33
August 15	Maximiliano & Patricia	Freestyle	Kylie Minogue – "Can't Get You Out of My Head"	9^{[j2]}	**8**	9	8	34
August 15	Anita & Bicho	Freestyle	Édith Piaf – "La Vie en rose"	10^{[j2]}	**10**	8	5	33
August 15	Mora & Marcos	Freestyle	The Chemical Brothers – "Do It Again" / Astor Piazzolla – "Libertango"	10^{[j2]}	**10**	10	8	38
August 18	Lizy & Gabriel	Freestyle	Chuck Berry – "You Never Can Tell" / Bernard Herrmann – "Twisted Nerve / David Guetta feat. Skylar Grey – "Shot Me Down"	9	**8**	9	7	33
August 18	Jésica & Juan Carlos	Freestyle	Queen – "Another One Bites the Dust" / Benny Goodman – "Sing, Sing, Sing (With a Swing)"	10	**9**	9	8	36
August 19	Diego & Lourdes	Synchronization	Icona Pop feat. Charli XCX – "I Love It"	**7**	8	9	4	28
August 19	Anita & Bicho	Synchronization	David Guetta feat. Flo Rida – "Club Can't Handle Me"	**7**	6	7	1	21
August 19	M. Eugenia & Fernando	Synchronization	David Guetta feat. Rihanna – "Who's That Chick?"	**5**	6	8	4	23
August 19	Laura & Martín	Synchronization	Rihanna – "S&M"	**8**	9	9	6	32
August 21	Victoria & Cristian	Synchronization	Calvin Harris feat. Ellie Goulding – "I Need Your Love"	**3**	8	6	4	21
August 21	Noelia & Facundo	Synchronization	Lorde – "Royals"	**8**	8	9	6	31
August 21	Hernán & Cecilia	Synchronization	Flo Rida – "Good Feeling"	**7**	5	8	3	23
August 21	Mariana & Cristian	Synchronization	David Guetta feat. Akon – "Sexy Bitch"	**5**	6	6	4	21
August 21	Mora & Marcos	Synchronization	David Guetta feat. Taio Cruz and Ludacris – "Little Bad Girl"	**9**	9	10	5	33
August 22	Pedro & Florencia	Synchronization	Ricky Martin – "Come with Me"	**6**	6	7	2	21
August 22	Eleonora & Pablo	Synchronization	David Guetta feat. Flo Rida and Nicki Minaj – "Where Them Girls At"	**7**	7	7	4	25
August 22	Luciano & Bárbara	Synchronization	LMFAO feat. Lauren Bennett and GoonRock – "Party Rock Anthem"	**2**	5	5	2	14
August 22	Maximiliano & Patricia	Synchronization	David Guetta feat. Kelly Rowland – "When Love Takes Over"	**6**	6	7	4	23
August 25	Anibal & Laura	Synchronization	Capital Cities – "Safe and Sound"	**7**	5	7	4	23
August 25	Lizy & Gabriel	Synchronization	Martin Solveig feat. Dragonette – "Hello"	**5**	5	7	4	21
August 25	Jésica & Juan Carlos	Synchronization	LMFAO – "Sexy and I Know It"	**7**	10	8	6	31
August 28	Diego & Lourdes	Folk music	Los Alonsitos – "Kilómetro 11"	8	**8**	8	5	29
August 28	Mora & Marcos	Folk music	Leandro Lovato – "La Juguetona"	9	**9**	8	6	32
August 29	Noelia & Facundo	Folk music	Los Nocheros – "La Yapa"	9^{[j1]}	**8**^{[j3]}	9	7	33
August 29	Victoria & Cristian	Folk music	Chaqueño Palavecino – "Troja de Amor"	7^{[j1]}	**3**^{[j3]}	5	3	18
August 29	Eleonora & Pablo	Folk music	Abel Pintos – "La Baguala"	8^{[j1]}	**7**^{[j3]}	8	5	28
August 29	Laura & Martín	Folk music	Soledad – "Entre A Mi Pago Sin Golpear"	8^{[j1]}	**6**^{[j3]}	6	4	24

=== September ===
Folk music, Salsa, Heel style and Bachata
Date	Couple	Style	Song	Score				Total
Date	Couple	Style	Song	Nacha	Moria	Soledad	Marcelo	Total
September 1	Pedro & Florencia	Folk music	Chaqueño Palavecino – "Chaco Escondido"	6	**8**	7	3	24
September 1	Lizy & Gabriel	Folk music	Los Nocheros – "La Taba"	7	**7**	6	4	24
September 1	Anibal & Laura	Folk music	Chaqueño Palavecino – "Envuelto En Llamas"	8	**8**	8	5	29
September 2	Hernán & Cecilia	Folk music	Los Nocheros – "Chakai Manta"	7	**10**	10	4	31
September 2	Anita & Bicho	Folk music	Los Nocheros – "La Telecita"	8	**9**	9	5	31
September 2	Mariana & Cristian	Folk music	Néstor Garnica – "Chacarera del Violín"	7	**8**	8	7	30
September 3	Jésica & Juan Carlos	Folk music	Chaqueño Palavecino – "La Refranera"	6^{[j2]}	**7**	6	5	24
September 3	Luciano & Bárbara	Folk music	Amboé – "Sobredosis de Chamamé"	5^{[j2]}	**5**	7	1	18
September 3	M. Eugenia & Fernando	Folk music	Los Nocheros – "Cuando Me Dices Que No"	8^{[j2]}	**8**	8	4	28
September 8	Jésica, Juan Carlos & Marcelo Iripino	Salsa	Dark Latin Groove – "Magdalena, Mi amor (Quimbara)"	7	7	**7**	2	23
September 8	Luciano, Bárbara & Marcela Feudale	Salsa	Don Omar – "Danza Kuduro (Salsa Remix)"	4	5	**7**	1	17
September 9	Noelia, Facundo & Laura Oliva	Salsa	Gloria Estefan – "Tres Deseos"	8	10	**8**	4	30
September 9	Hernán, Cecilia & Sixto Valdés	Salsa	Oscar D'León – "Llegó El Sabor"	10	10	**10**	10	40
September 11	Pedro, Florencia & Lali Espósito	Salsa	Marc Anthony – "Vivir Mi Vida"	10	8	**10**	6	34
September 12	Lizy, Gabriel & Nicole Neumann	Salsa	Gloria Estefan – "Mi Tierra"	7	7	**9**	7	30
September 12	M. Eugenia, Fernando & Federico Bal	Salsa	Pochy y Su Cocoband – "Salsa Con Coco"	8	10	**8**	6	32
September 12	Laura, Martín & Fátima Flórez	Salsa	Orquesta La 33 – "La Rumba Buena"	10	10	**10**	10	40
September 12	Mora, Marcos & Adabel Guerrero	Salsa	Sonora Carruseles – "Vengo Caliente"	9	8	**9**	9	35
September 15	Diego, Lourdes & Gisela Bernal	Salsa	Dark Latin Groove – "Acuyuyé"	8	8	**9**	7	32
September 15	Anita, Bicho & Denise Dumas	Salsa	Celia Cruz – "Que Le Den Candela"	6	8	**8**	1	23
September 15	Eleonora, Pablo & Walter Soares	Salsa	Tito Puente – "Ran Kan Kan"	5	4	**6**	2	17
September 16	Mariana, Cristian & Marcelo Manau	Salsa	Marc Anthony – "Valió la Pena"	8	10	**7**	6	31
September 16	Anibal, Laura & Sofía Pachano	Salsa	Jim Carrey – "Cuban Pete"	8	9	**8**	6	31
September 18	Lizy & Gabriel	Heel style	The Pussycat Dolls – "When I Grow Up"	**9**^{[j2]}	8	8	3	28
September 18	Sixto & Mariana	Heel style	Christina Aguilera feat. Redman – "Dirrty"	**9**^{[j2]}	10	10	5	34
September 19	Pedro & Florencia	Heel style	Rihanna feat. David Guetta – "Right Now"	**10**^{[j2]}	9	10	5	34
September 19	Noelia & Facundo	Heel style	Katy Perry feat. Juicy J – "Dark Horse"	**10**^{[j2]}	10	9	4	33
September 19	Diego & Lourdes	Heel style	Beyoncé – "Single Ladies (Put a Ring on It)"	**8**^{[j2]}	6	7	3	24
September 19	Laura & Martín	Heel style	Beyoncé feat. Jay-Z – "Déjà Vu"	**8**^{[j2]}	9	7	4	28
September 22	Eleonora & Pablo	Heel style	Britney Spears – "Work Bitch"	**9**	7	9	3	28
September 22	Anita & Bicho	Heel style	The Black Eyed Peas – "Boom Boom Pow"	**7**	8	9	4	28
September 22	Jésica & Juan Carlos	Heel style	Ariana Grande feat. Iggy Azalea – "Problem"	**9**	9	9	8	35
September 23	Hernán & Cecilia	Heel style	Beyoncé feat. Sean Paul – "Baby Boy"	**10**	10	10	8	38
September 23	Mariana & Cristian	Heel style	Lady Gaga feat. Beyoncé – "Telephone"	**6**	7	6	5	24
September 23	Anibal & Laura	Heel style	Destiny's Child – "Bootylicious"	**6**	6	6	1	19
September 23	Mora & Marcos	Heel style	Beyoncé feat. Jay-Z – "Crazy in Love"	**8**	9	7	7	33
September 25	M. Eugenia & Fernando	Heel style	Beyoncé – "Naughty Girl"	**8**^{[j2]}	10	9	4	31
September 26	Pedro & Florencia	Bachata	Prince Royce – "Stand by Me"	8^{[j2]}	**8**	9	3	28
September 26	Noelia & Facundo	Bachata	Willy William & LJ – "Get Lucky"	10^{[j2]}	**10**	10	8	38
September 26	Jésica & Juan Carlos	Bachata	Prince Royce feat. Thalía – "Te Perdiste Mi Amor"	7^{[j2]}	**9**	7	5	28
September 29	Hernán & Cecilia	Bachata	Juan Luis Guerra feat. Romeo Santos – "Frio Frio"	10	**10**	10	7	37
September 29	Sixto & Mariana	Bachata	Xtreme – "Te Extraño"	8	**8**	8	6	30
September 30	M. Eugenia & Fernando	Bachata	Juan Luis Guerra – "Burbujas de Amor"	4	**5**	6	2	17
September 30	Anita & Bicho	Bachata	Dzerej – "When I Was Your Man"	7	**7**	10	4	24
September 30	Anibal & Laura	Bachata	Rebecca Kingsley feat. Wyclef Jean – "Killing Me Softly with His Song"	9	**9**	10	6	34

=== October ===
Bachata, Reggaeton, Tango/Milonga, Rock and roll and Aquadance
Date	Couple	Style	Song	Score				Total
Date	Couple	Style	Song	Nacha	Moria	Soledad	Marcelo	Total
October 2	Eleonora & Pablo	Bachata	Jesse & Joy feat. La Republika – "¡Corre!"	10^{[j2]}	**9**	10	7	36
October 2	Lizy & Gabriel	Bachata	Romeo Santos – "Amigo"	9^{[j2]}	**6**	6	7	28
October 3	Diego & Lourdes	Bachata	Leslie Grace – "Be My Baby"	8^{[j2]}	**9**	9	4	30
October 3	Mora & Marcos	Bachata	Grupo Evidence feat. Juliana – "Colgando en tus manos"	10^{[j2]}	**10**	10	8	38
October 3	Laura & Martín	Bachata	Prince Royce – "Darte un Beso"	10^{[j2]}	**9**	9	7	35
October 7	Sixto & Mariana	Reggaeton	Dyland & Lenny feat. Keesha – "Tonight"	10	10	**9**	4	33
October 7	Mora & Marcos	Reggaeton	Wisin & Yandel – "Pegao"	9	9	**9**	4	31
October 7	Rosmery & Patricio	Reggaeton	Daddy Yankee – "El Ritmo No Perdona (Prende)"	7	10	**10**	10	37
October 9	Pedro & Florencia	Reggaeton	Calle 13 – "Baile de los Pobres"	10^{[j2]}	9	**10**	5	34
October 9	Lizy & Gabriel	Reggaeton	Jowell & Randy feat. Wisin & Yandel – "Loco"	9^{[j2]}	7	**5**	3	24
October 9	Eleonora & Pablo	Reggaeton	Yandel feat. Daddy Yankee – "Moviendo Caderas"	8^{[j2]}	6	**8**	2	24
October 10	Noelia & Facundo	Reggaeton	Terro 3000 – "Put Di Ting Deh"	10^{[j2]}	10^{[j3]}	**10**	10	40
October 10	Anita & Bicho	Reggaeton	Daddy Yankee – "Limbo"	6^{[j2]}	1^{[j3]}	**6**	1	14
October 10	Jésica & Juan Carlos	Reggaeton	Juan Magan feat. DJ Méndez and Crossfire – "Lady Loca"	10^{[j2]}	4^{[j3]}	**9**	1	24
October 13	Diego & Lourdes	Reggaeton	Daddy Yankee feat. Fergie – "Impacto"	7	7	**9**	1	24
October 13	Fátima & Freddy	Reggaeton	Wisin & Yandel – "Abusadora"	8	8	**8**	6	30
October 13	Anibal & Laura	Reggaeton	Maluma feat. Eli Palacios – "La Temperatura"	9	10	**10**	1	30
October 13	Laura & Martín	Reggaeton	Daddy Yankee – "Rompe"	8	10	**10**	8	36
October 14	Hernán & Cecilia	Reggaeton	Daddy Yankee – "Perros Salvajes"	10	10	**10**	8	38
October 16	Sixto & Mariana	Tango/Milonga	Aníbal Troilo – "Tinta Roja"	**8**	7	7	3	25
October 16	Lizy & Gabriel	Tango/Milonga	Raúl Lavié – "Milonga Sentimental"	**8**	9	8	5	30
October 16	Diego & Lourdes	Tango/Milonga	Gotan Project – "Nocturna"	**9**	9	8	5	31
October 16	Laura & Martín	Tango/Milonga	Astor Piazzolla – "Libertango"	**10**	10	9	7	36
October 17	Pedro & Florencia	Tango/Milonga	Carlos Gardel – "Por una Cabeza"	**8**	9	9	3	29
October 17	Rosmery & Patricio	Tango/Milonga	Aníbal Troilo – "Quejas de Bandoneón"	**8**	7	8	2	25
October 17	Noelia & Facundo	Tango/Milonga	Aníbal Troilo – "Danzarín"	**9**	10	10	6	35
October 17	Jésica & Juan Carlos	Tango/Milonga	Francisco Canaro – "Canaro en París"	**10**	9	7	5	31
October 20	Hernán & Cecilia	Tango/Milonga	Polaco Goyeneche – "Naranjo En Flor"	**9**	9	10	7	35
October 20	Anita & Bicho	Tango/Milonga	Mariano Mores – "Taquito Militar"	**8**	8	8	6	30
October 20	Anibal & Laura	Tango/Milonga	Mariano Mores – "El Firulete"	**7**	7	7	10	31
October 21	Eleonora & Pablo	Tango/Milonga	Mariano Mores – "Tanguera"	**8**	10	10	8	36
October 21	Mora & Marcos	Tango/Milonga	Gerardo Matos Rodríguez and Roberto Firpo – "La Cumparsita"	**10**	10	10	10	40
October 23	Eleonora & Pablo	Rock and roll	Queen – "Crazy Little Thing Called Love"	9^{[j2]}	**9**	10	5	33
October 23	Mora & Marcos	Rock and roll	Pat Boone – "Tutti Frutti"	10^{[j2]}	**8**	10	5	33
October 23	Anita & Bicho	Rock and roll	Miranda Lambert – "Jailhouse Rock"	10^{[j2]}	**8**	10	6	34
October 24	Pedro & Florencia	Rock and roll	Elvis Presley – "Blue Suede Shoes"	10^{[j2]}	**9**	9	7	35
October 24	Diego & Lourdes	Rock and roll	Kenny Loggins – "Footloose"	10^{[j2]}	**9**	10	5	34
October 24	Laura & Martín	Rock and roll	John Travolta – "Greased Lightning"	6^{[j2]}	**9**	7	5	25
October 27	Hernán & Cecilia	Rock and roll	Glee – "Proud Mary"	8	**7**	8	4	27
October 27	Anibal & Laura	Rock and roll	Bill Haley & His Comets – "Rock Around the Clock"	9	**7**	7	4	27
October 27	Noelia & Facundo	Rock and roll	Tom Jones – "Hound Dog"	9	**8**	9	5	31
October 27	Rosmery & Patricio	Rock and roll	Stray Cats – "(She's) Sexy + 17"	6	**6**	9	3	24
October 27	Jésica & Juan Carlos	Rock and roll	Elvis Presley – "All Shook Up"	5	**8**	7	4	24
October 28	Lizy & Gabriel	Rock and roll	Little Richard – "Long Tall Sally"	6	**7**	6	5	24
October 30	Pedro & Florencia	Aquadance	Gustavo Cerati and Mercedes Sosa – "Zona de Promesas"	8	8	**9**	6	31
October 30	Diego & Lourdes	Aquadance	Sia – "Chandelier"	9	9	**8**	5	31
October 30	Jésica & Juan Carlos	Aquadance	Adele – "Skyfall"	9	10	**9**	8	36
October 31	Hernán & Cecilia	Aquadance	Soda Stereo – "Corazón Delator"	10	10	**10**	10	40
October 31	Laura & Martín	Aquadance	Alanis Morissette – "Uninvited"	9	8	**9**	8	34
October 31	Eleonora & Pablo	Aquadance	Yuli Turovsky – "Carnival of the Animals"	8	8	**9**	6	31

=== November ===
Aquadance, Merengue, Latin pop, Arabic music and K-pop
Date	Couple	Style	Song	Score				Total
Date	Couple	Style	Song	Nacha	Moria	Soledad	Marcelo	Total
November 3	Noelia & Facundo	Aquadance	Soda Stereo – "En La Ciudad de La Furia"	8	8	**9**	4	29
November 3	Lizy & Gabriel	Aquadance	U2 feat. Mary J. Blige – "One"	7	8	**8**	8	31
November 3	Anibal & Laura	Aquadance	Glee – "True Colors"	8	10	**7**	9	34
November 3	Mora & Marcos	Aquadance	Celine Dion – "Alone"	7	7	**7**	5	26
November 4	Anita & Bicho	Aquadance	Los Nocheros – "Alfonsina y El Mar"	9	10	**10**	7	36
November 6	Noelia & Facundo	Merengue	Jandy Ventura & Los Potros – "Muévelo"	**10**^{[j2]}	10	10	7	37
November 6	Laura & Martín	Merengue	La Konga – "Niña Bonita"	**10**^{[j2]}	8	9	5	32
November 6	Mora & Marcos	Merengue	Wilfrido Vargas – "Abusadora"	**10**^{[j2]}	8	9	5	32
November 7	Pedro & Florencia	Merengue	Juan Luis Guerra – "A Pedir Su Mano"	**10**^{[j2]}	8	9	5	32
November 7	Anita & Bicho	Merengue	Olga Tañon – "Es Mentiroso"	**8**^{[j2]}	6	9	3	26
November 7	Diego & Lourdes	Merengue	Banda XXI – "Chica Sexy"	**10**^{[j2]}	10	10	6	36
November 7	Eleonora & Pablo	Merengue	La Konga – "Yo No Te Pido La Luna"	**10**^{[j2]}	9	9	5	33
November 10	Hernán & Cecilia	Merengue	Banda XXI – "Tu Cintura"	**9**	8	10	6	33
November 10	Jésica & Juan Carlos	Merengue	Banda XXI – "Cuando Me Enamoro"	**7**	7	8	4	26
November 10	Anibal & Laura	Merengue	Jean Carlos – "Quiéreme"	**8**	6	7	5	26
November 13	Noelia & Facundo	Latin pop	Ricky Martin – "Vida"	10^{[j2]}	**8**	9	5	32
November 13	Diego & Lourdes	Latin pop	Chayanne – "Torero"	10^{[j2]}	**9**	9	4	32
November 13	Jésica & Juan Carlos	Latin pop	David Bisbal – "Lloraré Las Penas"	9^{[j2]}	**8**	7	4	28
November 14	Pedro & Florencia	Latin pop	David Bisbal – "Bulería"	10^{[j2]}	**9**	10	4	33
November 14	Anita & Bicho	Latin pop	Chayanne – "Caprichosa"	7^{[j2]}	**9**	10	7	33
November 14	Laura & Martín	Latin pop	Ricky Martin – "Pégate"	9^{[j2]}	**8**	9	6	32
November 17	Hernán & Cecilia	Latin pop	Chayanne – "Ay Mamá"	8	**8**	8	4	28
November 17	Eleonora & Pablo	Latin pop	David Bisbal – "Ave María	5	**6**	8	4	23
November 17	Anibal & Laura	Latin pop	–	–	–	–	–	–
November 18	Diego & Lourdes	Arabic music	Hani Al Omari – "Molfet Lel Nazar"	7	6	**7**	3	23
November 20	Hernán & Cecilia	Arabic music	Amir Sofi – "Isis"	9	8	**6**	5	28
November 20	Pedro & Florencia	Arabic music	Hakim – "Ehdarun"	6	9	**10**	6	31
November 20	Jésica & Juan Carlos	Arabic music	Diaa – "El Leilah"	7	8	**9**	4	28
November 21	Noelia & Facundo	Arabic music	Hakim – "Ah Ya Albi"	9	10	**10**	7	36
November 21	Anita & Bicho	Arabic music	Hakim – "Wala Wahed"	9	10	**10**	6	35
November 21	Laura & Martín	Arabic music	Hakim – "Esma' Yalli"	8	10	**10**	5	33
November 24	Eleonora & Pablo	Arabic music	Mohamed Fouad – "Yalla Hawa"	8	7	**9**	4	28
November 25	Noelia & Facundo	K-pop	Girls' Generation – "I Got a Boy"	**9**	10	10	8	37
November 27	Hernán & Cecilia	K-pop	BtoB – "You're So Fly"	**7**	7	8	3	25
November 27	Jésica & Juan Carlos	K-pop	Girls' Generation-TTS – "Holler"	**8**	8	8	8	32
November 27	Eleonora & Pablo	K-pop	2NE1 – "I Am the Best"	**9**	9	9	5	32
November 28	Pedro & Florencia	K-pop	Shinee – "Sherlock"	**10**	10	10	10	40
November 28	Anita & Bicho	K-pop	Team H – "Driving to the Highway"	**8**	7	7	3	25
November 28	Laura & Martín	K-pop	Girls' Generation – "Paparazzi"	**9**	10	8	10	37

=== December ===
Flamenco and Electro dance
Date	Couple	Style	Song	Score					Total
Date	Couple	Style	Song	Nacha	Moria	Soledad	Marcelo	Public's vote	Total
December 2	Pedro & Florencia	Flamenco	Gipsy Kings – "A Mi Manera"	8	7	8	5	10	38
December 2	Noelia & Facundo	Flamenco	Estopa – "Tu Calorro"	9	9	9	8	10	45
December 2	Jésica & Juan Carlos	Flamenco	Ketama – "Agustito"	7	7	6	5	5	30
December 4	Hernán & Cecilia	Flamenco	Celedejuana – "Dime Qué Pasa Contigo"	8	9	9	5	10	41
December 4	Anita & Bicho	Flamenco	Rosario – "Rumba del Bongo"	6	7	9	10	9	41
December 4	Laura & Martín	Flamenco	Niña Pastori – "Cada Vez Que Miro"	8	8	8	6	6	36
December 5	Pedro & Florencia	Electro dance	Martin Garrix – "Animals"	10	10	9	10	9	48
December 5	Noelia & Facundo	Electro dance	Armin van Buuren feat. Trevor Guthrie – "This Is What It Feels Like"	8	7	8	6	7	36
December 5	Jésica & Juan Carlos	Electro dance	Calvin Harris and Alesso feat. Hurts – "Under Control"	5	6	8	9	7	35
December 5	Laura & Martín	Electro dance	Calvin Harris – "Summer"	8	7	8	7	8	38
December 5	Hernán & Cecilia	Electro dance	David Guetta and GLOWINTHEDARK feat. Harrison – "Ain't a Party"	7	10	9	5	9	40
December 8	Anita & Bicho	Electro dance	R3hab feat. Trevor Guthrie – "Soundwave"	8	8	8	7	9	40

==== Duel ====
Duel
Date	Couple	Style	Song
December 9	Hernán & Cecilia	Freestyle dance	The Killers – "Read My Mind"
December 9	Pedro & Florencia	Freestyle dance	Coldplay – "Viva la Vida"
December 9	Jésica & Juan Carlos	Freestyle dance	U2 – "Vertigo"
December 9	Noelia & Facundo	Freestyle dance	The Killers – "Human"
December 9	Anita & Bicho	Freestyle dance	The Rolling Stones – "Start Me Up"

==== Semifinal and Final ====
Semifinal and Final
Date	Couple	Style	Song	Points				Result
Date	Couple	Style	Song	Nacha	Moria	Soledad	Marcelo	Result
1st Semifinal (December 11)	Jésica & Juan Carlos	Heel style	Ariana Grande feat. Iggy Azalea – "Problem"		Silver medal	Silver medal	Silver medal	Gold medal
1st Semifinal (December 11)	Hernán & Cecilia	Heel style	Beyoncé feat. Sean Paul – "Baby Boy"	Silver medal				
1st Semifinal (December 11)	Jésica & Juan Carlos	Reggaeton	Juan Magan feat. DJ Méndez and Crossfire – "Lady Loca"	Silver medal	Silver medal	Silver medal	Silver medal	Gold medal
1st Semifinal (December 11)	Hernán & Cecilia	Reggaeton	Daddy Yankee – "Perros Salvajes"					
1st Semifinal (December 11)	Jésica & Juan Carlos	Tango/Milonga	Francisco Canaro – "Canaro en París"					
1st Semifinal (December 11)	Hernán & Cecilia	Tango/Milonga	Polaco Goyeneche – "Naranjo En Flor"	Silver medal	Silver medal	Silver medal	Silver medal	Gold medal
1st Semifinal (December 11)	Jésica & Juan Carlos	Street dance	Rihanna feat. Calvin Harris – "We Found Love"		Silver medal			
1st Semifinal (December 11)	Hernán & Cecilia	Street dance	One Direction – "One Thing"	Silver medal		Silver medal	Silver medal	Gold medal
2nd Semifinal (December 12)	Anita & Bicho	Argentine cumbia	Ráfaga – "Mentirosa"					
2nd Semifinal (December 12)	Noelia & Facundo	Argentine cumbia	Agapornis – "Volverte a Ver"	Silver medal	Silver medal	Silver medal	Silver medal	Gold medal
2nd Semifinal (December 12)	Anita & Bicho	Synchronization	David Guetta feat. Flo Rida – "Club Can't Handle Me"					
2nd Semifinal (December 12)	Noelia & Facundo	Synchronization	Lorde – "Royals"	Silver medal	Silver medal	Silver medal	Silver medal	Gold medal
2nd Semifinal (December 12)	Anita & Bicho	Merengue	Olga Tañon – "Es Mentiroso"	Silver medal	Silver medal			Gold medal
2nd Semifinal (December 12)	Noelia & Facundo	Merengue	Jandy Ventura & Los Potros – "Muévelo"			Silver medal	Silver medal	Gold medal
2nd Semifinal (December 12)	Anita & Bicho	Adagio	A-ha – "Crying in the Rain"	Silver medal	Silver medal	Silver medal	Silver medal	Gold medal
2nd Semifinal (December 12)	Noelia & Facundo	Adagio	Pink feat. Nate Ruess – "Just Give Me a Reason"					
Final (December 15)	Anita & Bicho	Ballet	Georges Bizet – "Carmen"					
Final (December 15)	Hernán & Cecilia	Ballet	Sergei Rachmaninoff – "Spring Waters"	Silver medal	Silver medal	Silver medal	Silver medal	Gold medal
Final (December 15)	Anita & Bicho	Bachata	Dzerej – "When I Was Your Man"		Silver medal		Silver medal	Gold medal
Final (December 15)	Hernán & Cecilia	Bachata	Juan Luis Guerra feat. Romeo Santos – "Frio Frio"	Silver medal		Silver medal		Gold medal
Final (December 15)	Anita & Bicho	Cuarteto	Banda XXI – "Pasame La Botella"	Silver medal	Silver medal	Silver medal	Silver medal	Gold medal
Final (December 15)	Hernán & Cecilia	Cuarteto	Rodrigo – "Fuego y Pasión"					
Final (December 15)	Anita & Bicho	K-pop	Team H – "Driving to the Highway"	Silver medal		Silver medal	Silver medal	Gold medal
Final (December 15)	Hernán & Cecilia	K-pop	BtoB – "You're So Fly"		Silver medal			

- **^[j1]** Replaced by Lolo Rossi.
- **^[j2]** Replaced by Graciela Alfano.
- **^[j3]** Replaced by Angel de Brito.
- **^[j4]** Replaced by Flavio Mendoza.
