= Bailando por un Sueño (Argentine TV series) season 2 =

Bailando por un Sueño
- Season 2

Release
- Original network: Canal 13
- Original release: July 3 – September 25, 2006

Season chronology
- ← Previous; Season 1 Next → Season 3

Bailando por un Sueño 2 was the second Argentine season of Bailando por un Sueño.

The first show of the season aired on July 3, 2006 and was part of the original show broadcast as Showmatch on Canal 13, and hosted by Marcelo Tinelli, as well as the previous season, that had finished a month before. This time there were 12 couples competing, and the competition lasted 13 weeks. The winner was revealed on the season finale, on September 25, 2006 and it was the actress, and comedian Florencia de la V, who was paired with the professional dancer, Manuel Rodríguez.

The judges were the same as in season one: journalist Jorge Lafauci, professional dancer Laura Fidalgo (who later competed on the show), vedette Zulma Faiad, and producer, actress and singer Reina Reech.

== Couples ==
Celebrity	Notability	Professional Partner	Status
Pablo Alarcón	Actor	Viviana Pérez	Eliminated 1st on July 5, 2006
Pablo Tamagnini	Singer	Fabiana Limanski	Eliminated 2nd on July 17, 2006
Ana Acosta	Comedian	Óscar Méndez	Eliminated 3rd on July 24, 2006
Boy Olmi	Actor	Lorena Paranyez	Eliminated 4th on July 31, 2006
Emanuel	Magician	Lorena Battle Ojeda	Eliminated 5th on August 7, 2006
Gino Renni	Actor	Karina Caregnato	Eliminated 6th on August 14, 2006
Silvina Luna	Model	Matías Ramírez	Eliminated 7th on August 21, 2006
Miguel del Sel	Comedian	María Leonor Ochoa	Eliminated 8th on September 4, 2006
Moria Casán	Actress and Vedette	Leonardo Picinato	Semi-finalists on September 11, 2006
María Eugenia Ritó	Dancer and Vedette	Darío Díaz	Semi-finalists on September 18, 2006
Emilia Attias	Model and actress	Lucas Tortorici	Second place on September 25, 2006
Florencia de la V	Actress and Comedian	Manuel Rodríguez	Winners on September 25, 2006

== Scoring chart ==
Couple	Place	1	2	3	4	5	6	7	8	9	SF	F
Florencia & Emanuel	1	27	28	31	26	36	24	28	30	34	4	4
Emilia & Lucas	2	29	32	36	30	25	29	36	28	35	5	2
M. Eugenia & Darío	3	32	28	31	27	30	26	23	28	32	2	
Moria & Leonardo	3	28	29	29	27	28	31	33	23	35	1	
Miguel & María	5	26	27	28	30	27	24	28	21			
Silvina & Matías	6	26	31	22	29	29	27	22				
Gino & Karina	7	19	21	24	22	26	21					
Emanuel & Lorena	8	25	23	22	27	21						
Boy & Lorena	9	25	21	28	23							
Ana & Oscar	10	26	29	22								
Pablo T. & Fabiana	11	27	21									
Pablo A. & Viviana	12	20										

Red numbers indicate the lowest score for each week.
Green numbers indicate the highest score for each week.
indicates the couple eliminated that week.
indicates the couple was saved by the public.
indicates the winning couple.
indicates the runner-up couple.
indicates the semi-finalists couples.

=== Highest and lowest scoring performances ===
The best and worst performances in each dance according to the judges' marks are as follows:

Dance	Best dancer(s)	Best score	Worst dancer(s)	Worst score
Salsa	Moria Casán	28	Gino Renni	19
Jazz	María Eugenia Ritó	32	Pablo Alarcón	20
Cha-cha-cha	Ana Acosta	29	Gino Renni	19
Disco	Emilia Attias	32	Pablo Tamagnini	21
Milonga	Florencia de la V	31	Ana Acosta	22
Hip-hop	Emilia Attias	36	Mago Emanuel; Silvina Luna	22
Rock and roll	Emilia Attias	30	Florencia de la V	26
Chacarera	Miguel del Sel	30	Gino Renni	22
Charleston	Florencia de la V	36	Gino Renni	26
Pasodoble	Silvina Luna	29	Mago Emanuel	21
Waltz	Silvina Luna	27	Miguel del Sel; Florencia de la V	24
Swing	Moria Casán	31	Gino Renni	21
Merengue	Emilia Attias	36	María Eugenia Ritó	23
Chamamé	Florencia de la V Miguel del Sel	28	Silvina Luna	22
Axé music	Florencia de la V	30	Miguel del Sel	21
Tango	María Eugenia Ritó	28	Moria Casán	23
Mambo	Florencia de la V	34	María Eugenia Ritó	32
Flamenco	Emilia Attias; Moria Casán	35	Emilia Attias; Moria Casán	35

== Dance schedule ==
- Week 1: Salsa or Jazz
- Week 2: Cha cha cha or Disco
- Week 3: Milonga or Hip Hop
- Week 4: Rock and roll or Chacarera
- Week 5: Charleston or Pasodoble
- Week 6: Waltz or Swing
- Week 7: Chamamé or Merengue
- Week 8: Axé music or Tango
- Week 9: Mambo or Flamenco (non-elimination week)
- Week 10 (1st Semi-final): Flamenco, Rock and roll and Disco
- Week 10 (2nd Semi-final): Mambo, Swing and Milonga
- Week 10 (Final): Lambada, Waltz and Charleston

== Dance chart ==
Couple	1	2	3	4	5	6	7	8	9	Semi-final			Final		
Florencia & Manuél	Salsa	Cha-cha-cha	Milonga	Rock and roll	Charleston	Waltz	Chamamé	Axé music	Mambo	Flamenco	Rock and roll	Disco	Lambada	Waltz	Charleston
Emilia & Lucas	Jazz	Disco	Hip-Hop	Rock and roll	Pasodoble	Swing	Merengue	Axé music	Flamenco	Mambo	Swing	Milonga	Lambada	Waltz	Charleston
María & Darío	Jazz	Cha-cha-cha	Hip-Hop	Chacarera	Charleston	Waltz	Merengue	Tango	Mambo	Flamenco	Rock and roll	Disco			
Moria & Leonardo	Salsa	Disco	Milonga	Chacarera	Pasodoble	Swing	Merengue	Tango	Flamenco	Mambo	Swing	Milonga			
Miguél & María	Salsa	Cha-cha-cha	Milonga	Chacarera	Charleston	Waltz	Chamamé	Axé music							
Silvina & Matías	Salsa	Disco	Hip-Hop	Rock and roll	Pasodoble	Waltz	Chamamé								
Gino & Karina	Salsa	Cha-cha-cha	Milonga	Chacarera	Charleston	Swing									
Emanuel & Lorena	Jazz	Disco	Hip-Hop	Rock and roll	Pasodoble										
Boy & Lorena	Jazz	Disco	Milonga	Chacarera											
Ana & Óscar	Jazz	Cha-cha-cha	Milonga												
Pablo & Fabiana	Salsa	Disco													
Pablo & Viviana	Jazz														

Highest scoring dance.
Lowest scoring dance.
Performed but not scored.
