= Claudia Ciardone =

Argentine model, theatre actress and vedette

- Born: 1980 (age 45–46); Loma Hermosa, Argentina
- Occupations: Vedette, actress, model, television personality
- Years active: 2007–Present
- Partner: Ricardo Fort (2010-2012)
- Modeling information
- Height: 1.68 m (5 ft 6 in)
- Manager: Leandro Rud modeling agency

Claudia Ciardone (Spanish pronunciation: [ˈklawðja sjaɾˈðone]; born in 1980) is an Argentine model, theatre actress and vedette who started her career after being the first person to be eliminated in Big Brother season 4 in Argentina, she had a relationship with Ricardo "El comandante" Fort. She was born in Loma Hermosa, Argentina.

== Theatre ==
On November 2, 2012, the actress made an appearance for the river border state of Argentina to Uruguay, Entre Ríos Province in the Astros theater where she and many other theater artist presented Entre Ríos' summer theatrical season debut for 2012 and 2013. Ciardone will be one of the lead actresses in the comedy theatre, "La noche de las pistolas frías".

- 2010: Fortuna - (Actress and Vedette) Covering Virginia Gallardo R J Gauna
- 2010-11: Fortuna 2 - (Actress and Vedette)
- 2011-12: Mi novio, mi novia y yo - (Lead Actress) Teatro Libertad (Córdoba) Ricardo Fort with Beatriz Salomón, Cristina del Valle, Jorge Martínez, Adriana Salgueiro, Jean François Casanova, Gabriela Figueroa, Jacobo Winograd
- 2012-13 : La noche de las pistolas frías - (Lead Actress) Teatro Astros (Entre Ríos) Mónica Farro, Marcos "Bicho" Gómez, Santiago Bal, Emilio Disi, Florencia "Floppy" Tesouro, Mabel de Luca, Manuel Navarrete, Carlos Moreno, Campi, Cristina Alberó, Luly Drozdek

== Patinando por un Sueño 2008 ==
In 2008 Ciardone participated in "Patinando por un Sueño/Skating for a Dream", the alternative version of Argentinas adaptation of Dancing with the Stars, Bailando por un Sueño in ShowMatch, hosted by Marcelo Tinelli.

Round #	Dance/Song	Judges' score				Result
Round #	Dance/Song	Ubfal	Polino	Reech	Vega	Result
1	Film Songs/ «Viaje Tiempo Atrás», Thalía (Anastacia)	8	5	8	8	Safe
2	1980's/ «Never Tears Us Apart», INXS	5	3	5	5	Saved; Lowest Score
3	Disco/ «Gloria», Laura Branigan	8	5	8	8	Safe
4	Reggaetón/ «Hips Don't Lie», Shakira	7	4	7	7	Saved; Third Lowest Score
5	Cumbia/ «Pega la vuelta», Sombras	9	4	9	10	Safe
6	Rock N’ Roll/ «See You Later Alligator», Bill Haley	8	4	9	10	Eliminated; Third Lowest Score

== Sources ==
- Da Silva Villarrubia, Santiago Katriel (January 17, 2007). "BIOGRAFIAS: Claudia Ciardone" (in Spanish).
- Da Silva Villarrubia, Santiago Katriel (September 14, 2010). "Claudia Ciardone reemplazará a Virginia Gallardo en "Fortuna"" (in Spanish).
- "Ensayo de "Fortuna 2", el musical de Ricardo Fort". Exitoina. 2011-01-04. Archived from the original on 2011-07-10.
- "Fortuna 2". Ciudad.com.
- Da Silva Villarrubia, Santiago Katriel (January 20, 2012). "Mi Novio, Mi Novia y Yo" (in Spanish).
