= Ricardo Fort =

Argentine socialite, entrepreneur and television director

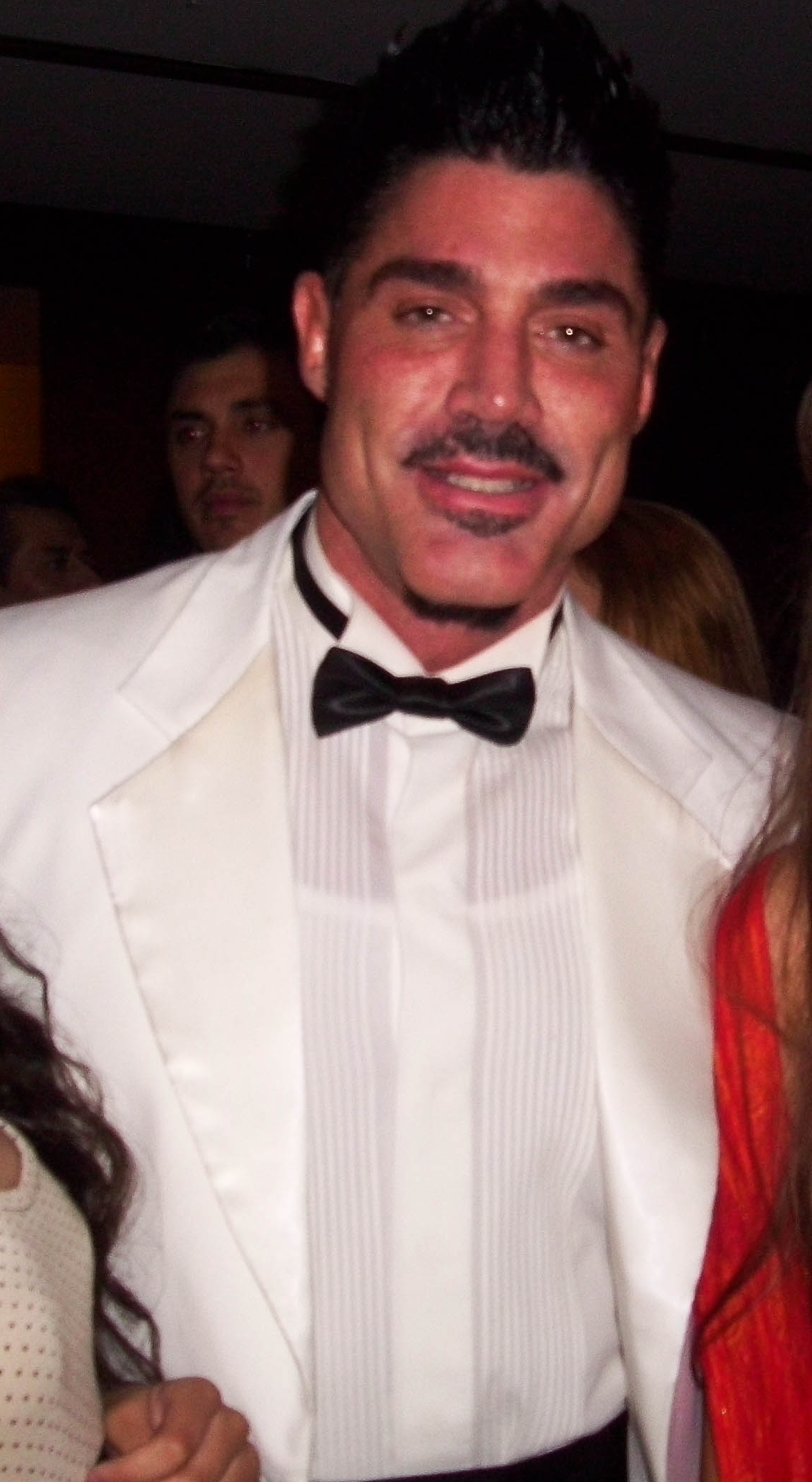
- Fort in 2009
- Born: Ricardo Aníbal Fort Campa; 5 November 1968; Buenos Aires, Argentina
- Died: 25 November 2013 (aged 45); Buenos Aires, Argentina
- Other names: Ricky; Comandante
- Occupations: Entrepreneur; television director
- Years active: 2008–2012
- Partner(s): Violeta Lo Re (2009); Virginia Gallardo (2009–2010); Erika Mitdank (2010); Claudia Ciardone (2010–2012); Rodrigo Díaz (2012–2013)
- Children: 2

Ricardo Aníbal Fort Campa (5 November 1968 − 25 November 2013) was an Argentine socialite, entrepreneur and television director. Although his career lasted four years, Fort was one of the most popular personalities in his country.

== Early life ==
The Felfort confectionery company was founded in 1912 in Buenos Aires by Fort's grandfather, Felipe Fort, and soon became one of the top confectionery companies in Argentina. Ricardo's father, Carlos Augusto Fort, took control of the company after Felipe's death in 1969. Ricardo Fort developed a close relationship with his mother, opera singer Marta Campa.

== Businesses ==
Fort developed businesses in the textile industry and in modeling as well as owned the Fortmen clothing line.

== Theater ==
Year	Production
2010	Fortuna
2011	Fortuna 2
2012	Mi novio, mi novia y yo
2013	Fort con caviar

== Television ==
In 2009, Fort participated in the reality series El musical de tus sueños.

In 2010, Fort was selected to be one of the judges of the seventh season of Bailando por un Sueño 2010.

In 2011, he worked in the theatrical production Fortuna 2.

Year	Program	Channel	Role
2009	El Musical de tus Sueños	Canal Trece	Himself
2009	Showmatch, El Musical de tus Sueños	Canal Trece	Participant
2010	Showmatch, Bailando por un Sueño 2010	Canal Trece	Judge
2012	Fort Night Show	América TV	Conductor
2023	El Comandante Fort	Star+	Himself

== Music ==
Fort released a single called No volverás early in his career.

== Personal life ==
In 2010, Fort revealed in an interview on the talk show Tienen la Palabra that his twin children Felipe and Marta were born of a surrogate mother found through the auspices of a company in California.

He was openly bisexual.

== Death ==
Fort died on 25 November 2013 in a Buenos Aires clinic, due to cardiac arrest following a gastrointestinal bleeding. He was being treated for a knee injury he suffered a few months before. He was 45 years old. Just days before, he had suffered a femoral fracture in Miami, Florida.
