= Eunice Castro =

Uruguayan model, theater dancer, television and runway hostess and actress

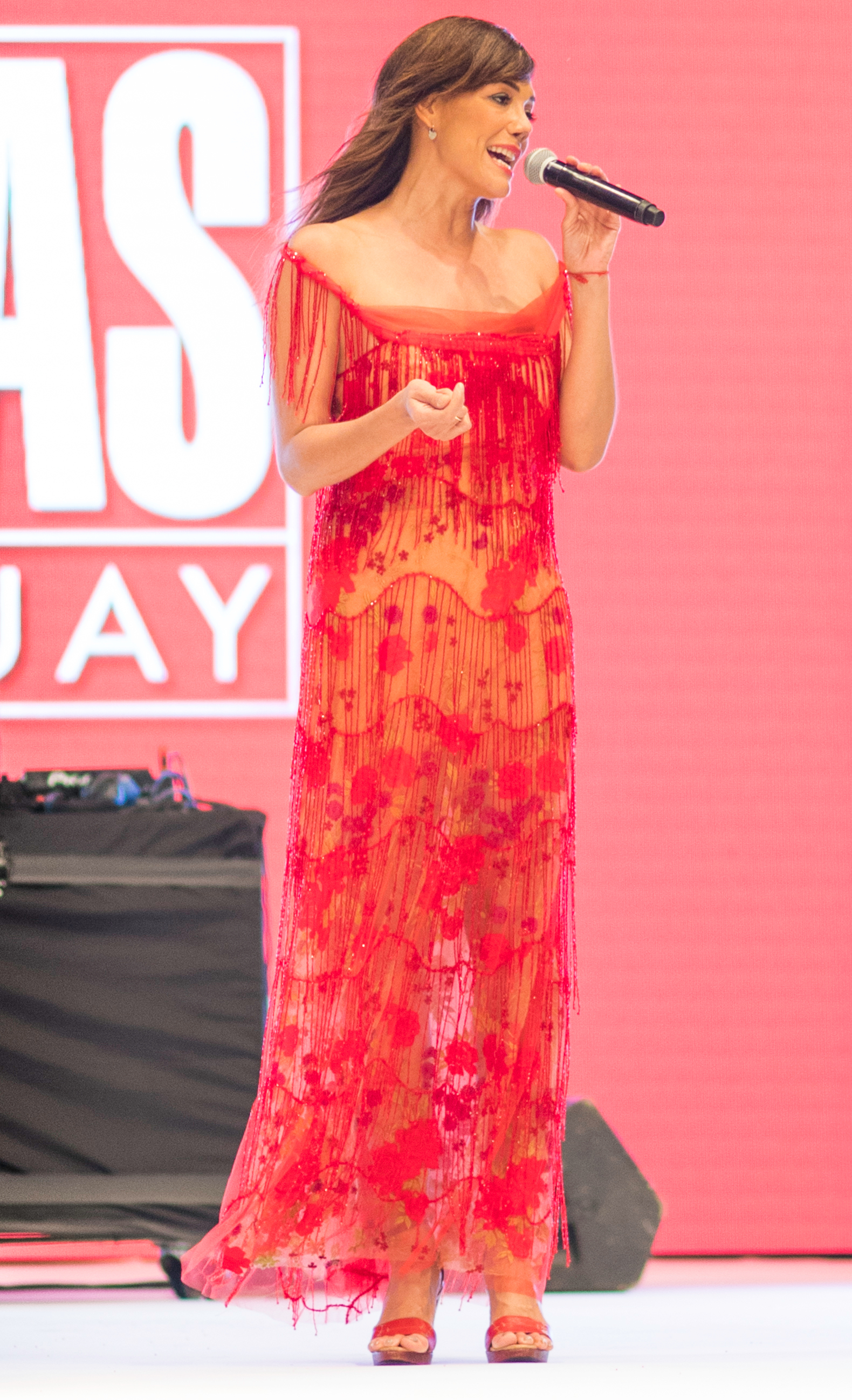
- Castro in 2017
- Born: Eunice Castro Casaravilla; January 6, 1976 (age 50); Montevideo, Uruguay
- Occupations: Model, actress, dancer, hostess
- Spouse: Jorge Rama (2000-2005)
- Parent(s): Glasy Casaravilla; Eduardo Castro

Eunice Castro Casaravilla (born January 6, 1976, in Montevideo) is a Uruguayan model of fashion and runway, professional theater dancer, television and runway hostess and actress of stage and screen.

== Trajectory ==
Castro is known for her work in Uruguay and Argentina.

Castro was born in Montevideo, Uruguay. She studied ballet at the National School of Dance in Uruguay and started working as a model of high couture, being top of major magazines such as Gente, Sábado Show, among others and was a model for Pepsi. Hired by the Elite agency in Madrid, she has walked the runway in Paris. In 2002 she was co-hostess with Sergio Puglia's Journal magazine Tveo to Uruguay by Channel 5. Between 2005 and 2008 she was host of the "Wide Awake" magazine issued in Channel 12 in Montevideo.

Castro participated in Dancing for a Dream Argentina 2008, being eliminated in 7th place in the competition, being the furthest Uruguayan competitor to reach the finals in this competition and in El Musical de tus Sueños/The Musical of your Dreams also of Argentina. She hosted alongside Maxi De la Cruz two Uruguayan programs: "The casting of the TV" in 2009 and "Minute to Win It" in 2010, both on Channel 12. In 2011 Eunice presented the summer season entertainment cycle "Minuto para Ganar" in Channel 12, an international format adapted in Uruguay and other Latin American countries.

She is currently part of the musical theater dramatic comedy, "Shangay", in which she stars alongside Claudia Albertario, Chunchuna Villafañe, José María Muscari and Nicolás Pauls since 2011. Directed and writing by José María Muscari, assisted by Adrián Rey; Scenography by Roxana Pozzoli; Illumination by Diego Todorovich; Costumes by Rocío Peyro; Choreography by Karina Kogan; Artistic and general production by Juan Carlos Cantafio and Hugo Zanón, coordinator, Nicolás Alvarez Pontiroli; Make-up by Ailen Ailen Zavalía. She made a cameo in 2012 on the soap opera audience success in Argentina, "Dulce Amor" on Telefé.

Since the summer of 2012 Castro is one of three hosts of a magazine in Channel 12, called "Verano Perfecto" which airs in the evenings. On the 28 of December 2012 Castro debuted as the hostess of the radio talk show, "Qué pasa Verano???" alongside Diego Fonsalia.

In January 2013 Castro was featured as the love interest of Jorge Echagüe's music video for the song "Seguiré".

== Personal life ==
She is of Spanish descent and is a fan of the football team, Peñarol. She has one older brother, Eduardo and an oldest sister named Yanice, who is also a model. Daughter of midwife Glasy Casaravilla and chemists assistance Eduardo Castro.

Eunice Castro was married to businessman Jorge Rama between 2000 and 2005, ex-husband of Susana Giménez.

Castro currently lives in the Uruguayan capital, Montevideo, her birthplace.
