= El Musical de tus Sueños =

- Logo
- Directed by: Alejandro Ripoll
- Presented by: Marcelo Tinelli
- Country of origin: Argentina

Production
- Running time: 150 mins. approx.

Original release
- Network: El Trece
- Release: August 24 – December 17, 2009

Related
- Bailando Kids; Bailando 2010

El Musical de tus Sueños was an alternate Argentine season of Bailando por un Sueño. In place of the traditional format of couples, each celebrity danced, sang and acted with a team of 5 dancers and one professional dancer. Each week they had to portray a different theme (love, fantasy, etc.). The elimination format was the same as in the traditional competition: each week the worst couples were eliminated, the jury retained some of them, and in the finale the last two remaining went to the public vote.

The first show of the season aired on August 24, 2009 as part of the original show, Showmatch, broadcast on El Trece and hosted by Marcelo Tinelli. 22 teams competed over a period of 18 weeks. The winner was revealed on the season finale, on December 17, 2009: the dancer and model Silvina Escudero.

The panel of judges were the model, actress and vedette Graciela Alfano, the director and choreographer Aníbal Pachano, actress and dancer Reina Reech, and the singer Valeria Lynch.

== Contestants ==
Celebrity	Notability	Team	Status
Dallys Ferreira	Model	Julián Andrés Carbajal; Andrés Espinel; Adrian Juan; Belén Alonso; Virginia Dobrich (Coach: Alejandra Castro Videla)	Eliminated 1st by the 42.1%
Daniela Cardone	Model	Abel Faccini; Leandro Basano; Matías Cejas; Pamela Garegnani; Vanesa D'Ambrosio (Coach: Karina Kogan)	Eliminated 2nd by the 49.08%
Fabián Gianola	Actor	Maro Ricardini; Matías Ramos; Florencia Anca; Johana Pomeraniec; Connie Canova (Coach: Cristina Girona)	Eliminated 3rd by the 42.7%
Miguel Ángel Cherutti	Comedian and Actor	Juan Pablo Battaglia; Matías Sayago; Laura Montini; Daniela Palacios; Romina Giardina (Coach: Agustina Maier)	Eliminated 4th by the 40.7%
Wanda Nara	Model	Martín Gómez; Sebastián Pavón; Gastón Fernández; Vanesa Encina Guetzel; Gabriela Peralta (Coach: Verónica Garabelo)	Eliminated 5th by the 32.8%
Nazarena Vélez	Actress	–	Withdrew
Flavia Palmiero	Television Presenter	Juan Cruz García; Carlos Perez Banegas; Fernando Nougues; Daniela Starto; Valeria Celurso (Coach: Ariel Pastochi)	Eliminated 6th by the 33.7%
Rocío Marengo^{[a]}	Model	Darío Segovia; Pedro Velásquez; Gustavo Pecheto; Natalia Perea; Romina Parodi (Coach: Virginia Querejet)	Eliminated 7th by the 33.9%
María Vazquez	Model	–	Withdrew
Eunice Castro^{[b]}	Model and Television Presenter	Maximiliano D'Iorio; Ariel Porchera; Marcos Gorosito; Romina Cechetini; Analía Irrazabal (Coach: Marisa de Risi)	Eliminated 8th by the 46.4%
Tití Fernández	Journalist	Francisco Prieto; Lucas Heredia; Flavia Pereda; Cristel Coopman; Lourdes Sánchez (Coach: Carla Noval)	Eliminated 9th by the 42.9%
Nicole Neumann	Model	Martín Whitencamp; Oscar Lajad; Pier Fritzsche; Julia Montiliengo; María Merolla (Coach: Mariela Anchipi)	Eliminated 10th by the 32.2%
Iliana Calabró	Actress and Comedian	Nicolás Scillama; Pedro Frías; Gabriel Usandivaras; Jesica Yanil García; Barby Reali (Coach: Darío Dorzi)	Eliminated 11th by the 37.9%
Vanina Escudero	Silvina Escudero's sister	Damián Martinez; Hernán Cuevas; Maximiliano Nieto; Soledad Camardella; Silvina Tordente (Coach: Hernán Alegre)	Eliminated 12th by the 46.4%
Matías Alé	Comedian and TV Personality	Leonardo Tito; Bruno Aragón; Loli Risso; Florencia Vitervo; Eliana Yanuzzi (Coach: Valeria Perez Roux)	Eliminated 13th by the 49.38%
Laura Oliva	Actress and Comedian	Diego Gómez; Augusto Fraga; Hernán Doval; Marien Caballero Galve; Judith Kovalovsky (Coach: Karina Vargas)	Eliminated 14th by the 45.7%
Silvina Luna	Model	Sergio Massi; Ariel Juárez; Daniel Amador; Mariela Rosso; Lorena Navarrine (Coach: Gastón Tavagnutti)	Eliminated 15th by the 49.02%
Adabel Guerrero	Vedette	Martín Gómez; Sebastián Pavón; Gastón Fernández; Vanesa Encina Guetzel; Gabriela Peralta (Coach: Verónica Garabelo)	Eliminated 16th by the 46.37%
María Eugenia Ritó	Vedette	Juan Leandro Nimo; Emanuel González; Cristian Ponce; María Laura Cattalini; Carla Laplace (Coach: Gustavo Bertuol)	Semifinalist by the 48.8%
Rocío Guirao Díaz	Model	Martín Marin; Adrián Scaramella; Juan Carlos Acosta; Carla Lanci; Gisela Soto (Coach: Vanesa García Millán)	Semifinalist by the 49.68%
Ricardo Fort	TV Personality	Juan Pablo Battaglia; Matías Sayago; Laura Montini; Daniela Palacios; Romina Giardina (Coach: Agustina Maier)	Second place by the 43.57%
Silvina Escudero	Matías Alé's girlfriend	Damián Duarte; Facundo Mazei; Rodrigo Escobar; Noelia Marzol; Paola García (Coach: Silvina Barañao)	Winner by the 56.43%

- ^[a] Nazarena Velez left the competition, and Rocío Marengo entered in her place.
- ^[b] María Vazquez left the competition, and Eunice Castro entered in her place.
- Winners of the re-entry (round 14):
  - Matías Alé.
  - Adabel Guerrero (replacing Wanda Nara).
  - Ricardo Fort (replacing María Vazquez).

== Scoring chart ==
Celebrity	Place	01	02	03	04	05	06	07	08	09	10	11	12	13	14	15	16	17	SF	F
Silvina E.	1	32	30	34	29	21	36	25	33	32	29	33	36	34	34	31^{[2]}	SAFE	SAFE	6	6
Ricardo	2														34	34	SAFE	SAFE	5	2
Rocío G.	3/4	29	30	29	37	28	36	35	28	29	32	33	37	36	31	34	SAFE	SAFE	2	
M. Eugenia	3/4	34	36	33	30	24	28	30	36	29	35	36	33	32	34	37	SAFE	SAFE	3	
Adabel	5														38	37	SAFE	ELIM		
Silvina L.	6	27	30	34	29	29	28	30	34	*	32	33	31	34	35	34	ELIM			
Laura	7	37	34	32	36	29	35	29	28	30	37	29	33	36	38	34				
Matías	8	31	30	32	25	18	30	25	19	17					26					
Vanina	9	37	38	32	35	26	35	25	23	36	37	33	36	32						
Iliana	10	29	25	30	33	21	28	29	23	27	29	37	31							
Nicole	11	29	32	32	31	20	33	17	35	29	31	30								
Tití	12	28	28	28	32	37	26	25	33	29	*									
Eunice	13								21											
María	14	32	36	35	37	33	37	30												
Rocío M.	15						25	17												
Flavia	16	24	30	24	33^{[1]}	29	25													
Nazarena	17	22	29	29	29	21														
Wanda	18	29	25	26	31	18														
Miguel	19	31	37	30	27															
Fabián	20	28	33	28																
Daniela	21	27	26																	
Dallys	22	24																		

- Tití Fernandez and Silvina Luna were sentenced because they stopped their routines in the middle of the choreography, as they forgot it. Silvina was saved by the judges (week 9), but Tití was eliminated (week 10).
- In weeks 16 and 17, all the teams danced as they were in a sentence, so there were no scores. In week 16 they danced Cumbia, and in week 17 Merengue. The safe couples in week 17, were the semifinalists.

Red numbers indicate the lowest score for each week.
Green numbers indicate the highest score for each week.
indicates the couple eliminated that week.
indicates the returning couple was saved by the judges.
indicates the returning couple was the last to be called safe and finished in the bottom two.
indicates the couple that withdrew.
indicates the winning couple.
indicates the runner-up couple.
indicates the semifinalists couples.

- ^[2] replaced by Victoria Onetto.
- ^[2] replaced by Vanina Escudero.

=== Highest and lowest scoring performances ===
The best and worst performances in each dance according to the judges' marks are as follows:

Theme	Best dancer(s)	Best score	Worst dancer(s)	Worst score
Love	Laura Oliva; Vanina Escudero	37	Nazarena Vélez	22
Movies	Vanina Escudero	38	Iliana Calabró; Wanda Nara	25
Latin pop	Maria Vazquez	35	Flavia Palmiero	24
Lust	Maria Vazquez; Rocío Guirao Díaz	37	Nazarena Vélez; Matías Alé	25
Impossible love	Tití Fernández	37	Wanda Nara; Matías Alé	18
Pop gold	Maria Vazquez	37	Rocío Marengo; Flavia Palmiero	25
Classics of Argentine rock	Rocío Guirao Díaz	35	Rocío Marengo; Nicole Neumann	17
Balada	María Eugenia Ritó	36	Matías Alé	19
Latin hits	Vanina Escudero	36	Matías Alé	17
Kings of pop	Laura Oliva; Vanina Escudero	37	Iliana Calabro; Silvina Escudero	29
Caribbean music	Iliana Calabro	37	Laura Oliva	29
Fantasy	Rocío Guirao Díaz	37	Iliana Calabro; Silvina Luna	29
Street music	Laura Oliva; Rocío Guirao Díaz	36	Vanina Escudero; María Eugenia Ritó	32
Music of Argentina	Laura Oliva; Adabel Guerrero	38	Matías Alé	26
Reggaeton	Adabel Guerrero; María Eugenia Ritó	37	Silvina Escudero	31

== Styles, scores and songs ==
Secret vote is in bold text.

=== August ===
Love and Movies
Date	Celebrity	Theme	Song	Score				Total
Date	Celebrity	Theme	Song	Graciela	Anibal	Reina	Valeria	Total
August 24	Nicole Neumann	Love	Bee Gees – "Tragedy"	8	5	**8**	8	29
August 24	Nicole Neumann	Love	Gloria Gaynor – "Can't Take My Eyes Off You"	8	5	**8**	8	29
August 24	Rocío Guirao Díaz	Love	Alicia Keys – "Fallin'"	7	6	**8**	8	29
August 24	Rocío Guirao Díaz	Love	Joss Stone – "You Had Me"	7	6	**8**	8	29
August 24	Fabián Gianola	Love	Creedence Clearwater Revival – "Bad Moon Rising"	8	4	**8**	8	28
August 24	Fabián Gianola	Love	Dire Straits – "Walk of Life"	8	4	**8**	8	28
August 24	María Vázquez	Love	Santana featuring Maná – "Corazón espinado"	9	6	**9**	8	32
August 24	María Vázquez	Love	Jennifer Lopez – "Let's Get Loud"	9	6	**9**	8	32
August 24	Laura Oliva	Love	Gloria Estefan – "Con los años que me quedan"	10	7	**10**	10	37
August 24	Laura Oliva	Love	Gloria Estefan – "Ayer"	10	7	**10**	10	37
August 25	María Eugenia Ritó	Love	Juan Luis Guerra 440 – "Burbujas de Amor"	9	7	**9**	9	34
August 25	María Eugenia Ritó	Love	Juan Luis Guerra 440 – "A Pedir Su Mano"	9	7	**9**	9	34
August 25	Tití Fernández	Love	Édith Piaf – "La Vie en rose"	8	4	**8**	8	28
August 25	Tití Fernández	Love	Frank Sinatra – "Cheek to Cheek"	8	4	**8**	8	28
August 25	Silvina Luna	Love	Thalía – "Gracias a Dios"	8	3	**8**	8	27
August 25	Silvina Luna	Love	David Bisbal – "Oye El Boom"	8	3	**8**	8	27
August 25	Flavia Palmiero	Love	Cher – "Strong Enough"	7	3	**7**	7	24
August 25	Dallys Ferreira	Love	Christina Aguilera – "Fighter"	7	4	**7**	6	24
August 25	Nazarena Vélez	Love	Madonna featuring Justin Timberlake and Timbaland – "4 Minutes"	7	3	**6**	6	22
August 25	Nazarena Vélez	Love	Madonna – "Express Yourself"	7	3	**6**	6	22
August 25	Silvina Escudero	Love	Gipsy Kings – "Bamboleo"	8	6	**9**	9	32
August 25	Silvina Escudero	Love	David Bisbal – "Bulería"	8	6	**9**	9	32
August 27	Wanda Nara	Love	ABBA – "Gimme! Gimme! Gimme! (A Man After Midnight)"	9	5	**7**	8	29
August 27	Wanda Nara	Love	ABBA – "The Winner Takes It All"	9	5	**7**	8	29
August 27	Matías Alé	Love	Britney Spears – "...Baby One More Time"	7	6	**9**	9	31
August 27	Matías Alé	Love	N'Sync – "Pop"	7	6	**9**	9	31
August 27	Iliana Calabró	Love	The Beach Boys – "Kokomo"	8	5	**8**	8	29
August 27	Iliana Calabró	Love	The Beach Boys – "California Girls"	8	5	**8**	8	29
August 27	Daniela Cardone	Love	Donna Summer – "Last Dance"	8	3	**8**	8	27
August 27	Daniela Cardone	Love	Earth, Wind & Fire – "September"	8	3	**8**	8	27
August 27	Vanina Escudero	Love	Chris de Burgh – "The Lady in Red"	10	7	**10**	10	37
August 27	Miguel Ángel Cherutti	Love	Queen – "Crazy Little Thing Called Love"	9	6	**8**	8	31
August 31	María Eugenia Ritó	Movies	Bee Gees – "Stayin' Alive" (from Saturday Night Fever)	9	7	10	**10**	36
August 31	María Eugenia Ritó	Movies	Bee Gees – "You Should Be Dancing"	9	7	10	**10**	36
August 31	María Eugenia Ritó	Movies	Bee Gees – "Night Fever"	9	7	10	**10**	36
August 31	María Eugenia Ritó	Movies	The Trammps – "Disco Inferno	9	7	10	**10**	36
August 31	Tití Fernández	Movies	The B52's – "(Meet) The Flintstones" (from The Flintstones)	9	5	7	**7**	28
August 31	Rocío Guirao Díaz	Movies	Irene Cara – "Fame" (from Fame)	8	6	8	**8**	30
August 31	Laura Oliva	Movies	Will Smith – "Black Suits Comin' (Nod Ya Head)" (from Men in Black II)	9	6	9	**10**	34
August 31	Silvina Luna	Movies	John Travolta and Olivia Newton-John – "Summer Nights" (from Grease)	9	5	8	**8**	30
August 31	Silvina Luna	Movies	John Travolta and Olivia Newton-John – "You're the One That I Want"	9	5	8	**8**	30

=== September ===
Movies, Latin pop, Lust, Impossible love and Pop gold
Date	Celebrity	Theme	Song	Score				Total
Date	Celebrity	Theme	Song	Graciela	Anibal	Reina	Valeria	Total
September 1	Wanda Nara	Movies	High School Musical – "We're All in This Together" (from High School Musical)	7	4	7	**7**	25
September 1	Silvina Escudero	Movies	Celine Dion – "My Heart Will Go On" (from Titanic)	8	6	8	**8**	30
September 1	Flavia Palmiero	Movies	The Righteous Brothers – "Unchained Melody" (from Ghost)	8	6	8	**8**	30
September 1	Iliana Calabró	Movies	Kenny Loggins – "Footloose" (from Footloose)	7	4	7	**7**	25
September 1	Daniela Cardone	Movies	Starship – "Nothing's Gonna Stop Us Now" (from Mannequin)	7	4	7	**8**	26
September 1	Miguel Ángel Cherutti	Movies	Jim Carrey – "Cuban Pete" (from The Mask)	10	7	10	**10**	37
September 3	Nicole Neumann	Movies	Christina Aguilera, Lil' Kim, Mýa and Pink – "Lady Marmalade" (from Moulin Rouge)	8	6	9	**9**	32
September 3	María Vázquez	Movies	Britney Spears – "I Love Rock and Roll" (from Charlie's Angels)	10	7	9	**10**	36
September 3	Matías Alé	Movies	Moby – "James Bond Theme" (from Tomorrow Never Dies)	8	6	8	**8**	30
September 3	Vanina Escudero	Movies	Michael Sembello – "Maniac" (from Flashdance)	10	8	10	**10**	38
September 3	Vanina Escudero	Movies	Irene Cara – "What a Feeling (Flashdance)"	10	8	10	**10**	38
September 3	Fabián Gianola	Movies	Madonna – "Beautiful Stranger" (from Austin Powers: The Spy Who Shagged Me)	9	6	9	**9**	33
September 3	Fabián Gianola	Movies	Quincy Jones – "Soul Bossa Nova"	9	6	9	**9**	33
September 3	Nazarena Vélez	Movies	Bill Medley and Jennifer Warnes – "(I've Had) The Time of My Life" (from Dirty Dancing)	8	5	8	**8**	29
September 7	Rocío Guirao Díaz	Latin pop	Chayanne – "Caprichosa"	**7**	6	8	8	29
September 7	Flavia Palmiero	Latin pop	Christina Aguilera – "Falsas Esperanzas"	**6**	5	7	6	24
September 8		Latin pop						
September 8	María Eugenia Ritó	Latin pop	Shakira – "Te Aviso, Te Anuncio (Tango)"	**9**	6	9	9	33
September 8	Wanda Nara	Latin pop	David Bisbal – "Ave María"	**7**	5	7	7	26
September 8	Silvina Escudero	Latin pop	Shakira featuring Alejandro Sanz – "La Tortura"	**9**	7	9	9	34
September 8	Tití Fernández	Latin pop	Thalía – "Amor a la Mexicana"	**8**	5	7	8	28
September 8	Laura Oliva	Latin pop	Ricky Martin – "María"	**8**	6	9	9	32
September 8	Silvina Luna	Latin pop	Thalía – "Mujer Latina"	**9**	7	9	9	34
September 8	Fabián Gianola	Latin pop	Ricky Martin – "Pégate"	**7**	5	8	8	28
September 8	Nazarena Vélez	Latin pop	Thalía – "¿A quién le importa?"	**7**	6	8	8	29
September 10	Nicole Neumann	Latin pop	Ricky Martin – "She Bangs"	**8**	6	9	9	32
September 10	Matías Alé	Latin pop	Chayanne – "Boom Boom"	**8**	6	9	9	32
September 10	María Vázquez	Latin pop	David Bisbal – "Lloraré las Penas"	**10**	7	9	9	35
September 10	Iliana Calabró	Latin pop	Thalía – "Arrasando"	**8**	6	8	8	30
September 10	Vanina Escudero	Latin pop	Chayanne – "Salomé"	**8**	6	9	9	32
September 10	Miguel Ángel Cherutti	Latin pop	Chayanne – "Torero"	**9**	5	8	8	30
September 14	María Eugenia Ritó	Lust	Depeche Mode – "Enjoy the Silence"	8	**6**	8	8	30
September 14	Silvina Luna	Lust	Aerosmith – "Crazy"	8	**5**	8	8	29
September 14	Vanina Escudero	Lust	Midnight Oil – "Beds Are Burning"	8	**7**	10	10	28
September 15	Wanda Nara	Lust	Britney Spears – "(I Can't Get No) Satisfaction"	9	**5**	9	8	31
September 15	Rocío Guirao Díaz	Lust	Alannah Myles – "Black Velvet"	10	**7**	10	10	37
September 15	Silvina Escudero	Lust	Lenny Kravitz – "American Woman"	8	**5**	8	8	29
September 15	Laura Oliva	Lust	Aerosmith – "Pink"	9	**7**	10	10	36
September 15	Miguel Ángel Cherutti	Lust	Frankie Goes to Hollywood – "Relax"	8	**4**	8	7	27
September 15	Nazarena Vélez	Lust	Bon Jovi – "It's My Life"	8	**5**	8	8	29
September 17	Matías Alé	Lust	AC/DC – "Highway to Hell"	7	**4**	7	7	25
September 17	Nicole Neumann	Lust	Prince – "Purple Rain"	8	**6**	8	9	31
September 17	Victoria Onetto	Lust	Bon Jovi – "You Give Love a Bad Name"	9	**6**	9	9	33
September 17	María Vázquez	Lust	Aerosmith – "Rag Doll"	9	**8**	10	10	37
September 17	Tití Fernández	Lust	AC/DC – "Back in Black"	9	**8**	8	9	24
September 17	Iliana Calabró	Lust	AC/DC – "You Shook Me All Night Long"	9	**6**	9	9	33
September 21	Wanda Nara	Impossible love	Jennifer Lopez and Marc Anthony – "No Me Ames"	6	3	**5**	4	18
September 21	Vanina Escudero	Impossible love	Shakira – "Estoy Aquí"	8	4	**8**	6	26
September 22	María Eugenia Ritó	Impossible love	Makano – "Te Amo"	7	4	**7**	6	24
September 22	Rocío Guirao Díaz	Impossible love	Gilda – "Corazón Rebelde"	8	5	**8**	7	28
September 22	Iliana Calabró	Impossible love	Marcela Morelo – "La Fuerza del Engaño"	8	4	**5**	4	21
September 22	Laura Oliva	Impossible love	Son by Four – "A Puro Dolor"	9	7	**8**	7	29
September 22	Silvina Escudero	Impossible love	Gilda – "Fuiste"	7	4	**5**	5	21
September 22	Silvina Luna	Impossible love	Daddy Yankee – "Llamado de Emergencia"	9	5	**8**	7	29
September 24	Nicole Neumann	Impossible love	Ricky Martin featuring La Mari and Tommy Torres – "Tu Recuerdo"	6	4	**6**	4	20
September 24	Flavia Palmiero	Impossible love	Los Bandoleiros – "Amor de Mis Amores"	8	5	**9**	7	29
September 24	Matías Alé	Impossible love	Rodrigo – "Como le Digo"	6	3	**5**	4	18
September 24	María Vázquez	Impossible love	Fabiana Cantilo – "Nada Es Para Siempre"	10	6	**9**	8	33
September 24	Tití Fernández	Impossible love	Vicentico— "Algo Cóntigo"	10	7	**10**	10	37
September 24	Nazarena Vélez	Impossible love	Raffaella Carrà – "03 03 456"	7	4	**6**	4	21
September 28	Flavia Palmiero	Pop gold	Shakira – "Suerte"	7	4	7	**7**	25
September 29	María Eugenia Ritó	Pop gold	Madonna – "Sorry"	8	5	8	**7**	28
September 29	Silvina Escudero	Pop gold	Kylie Minogue – "Can't Get You Out of My Head"	9	7	10	**10**	36
September 29	Iliana Calabró	Pop gold	Madonna – "Vogue"	8	5	7	**8**	28
September 29	Rocío Guirao Díaz	Pop gold	Christina Aguilera – "Dirrty"	10	6	10	**10**	36
September 29	Laura Oliva	Pop gold	Britney Spears – "Womanizer"	10	6	9	**10**	35
September 29	Tití Fernández	Pop gold	Tom Jones – "Sex Bomb"	8	4	7	**7**	26

=== October ===
Pop gold, Classics of Argentine rock, Balada, Latin hits and Kings of pop
Date	Celebrity	Theme	Song	Score				Total
Date	Celebrity	Theme	Song	Graciela	Anibal	Reina	Valeria	Total
October 1	Nicole Neumann	Pop gold	Christina Aguilera – "Ain't No Other Man"	9	6	9	**9**	33
October 1	María Vázquez	Pop gold	Rihanna – "Don't Stop the Music"	10	7	10	**10**	37
October 1	Matías Alé	Pop gold	Mika – "Love Today"	8	5	8	**9**	30
October 1	Vanina Escudero	Pop gold	Geri Halliwell – "It's Raining Men"	10	6	9	**10**	35
October 1	Silvina Luna	Pop gold	A-Teens – "Mamma Mia!"	8	5	8	**7**	28
October 1	Rocío Marengo	Pop gold	Britney Spears – "Toxic"	7	4	7	**7**	25
October 5	Laura Oliva	Classics of Argentine rock	Soda Stereo – "De Música Ligera"	**7**	5	8	8	29
October 6	María Eugenia Ritó	Classics of Argentine rock	Los Rodríguez – "Sin Documentos"	**9**	5	8	8	30
October 6	Rocío Guirao Díaz	Classics of Argentine rock	Fabiana Cantilo – "Mary Poppins y El Deshollinador"	**10**	6	10	9	35
October 6	Silvina Escudero	Classics of Argentine rock	Los Abuelos de la Nada – "Costumbres Argentinas"	**7**	4	7	7	25
October 6	Iliana Calabró	Classics of Argentine rock	Turf – "Loco Un Poco"	**8**	5	8	8	29
October 6	Vanina Escudero	Classics of Argentine rock	Fito Páez – "Mariposa Technicolor"	**8**	4	7	6	25
October 6	Tití Fernández	Classics of Argentine rock	Diego Torres – "Sueños"	**7**	4	7	7	25
October 8	Nicole Neumann	Classics of Argentine rock	Andrés Calamaro – "Dulce Condena	**5**	2	5	5	17
October 8	María Vázquez	Classics of Argentine rock	Fito Páez – "A Rodar Mi Vida"	**9**	5	8	8	30
October 8	Rocío Marengo	Classics of Argentine rock	Miranda! – "Don"	**6**	2	5	4	17
October 8	Matías Alé	Classics of Argentine rock	Los Fabulosos Cadillacs – "El Matador"	**7**	4	8	6	25
October 8	Silvina Luna	Classics of Argentine rock	Soda Stereo – "Persiana Americana"	**9**	5	8	8	30
October 13	Rocío Guirao Díaz	Balada	Chayanne – "Dejaría Todo"	8	**5**	8	7	28
October 13	Matías Alé	Balada	Alejandro Sanz – "Y Si Fuera Ella"	7	**3**	5	4	19
October 13	Silvina Escudero	Balada	Ricardo Arjona – "Dime Que No"	9	**6**	9	9	33
October 13	Tití Fernández	Balada	David Bisbal – "Dígale"	10	**6**	8	9	33
October 13	Laura Oliva	Balada	Ricky Martin – "Vuelve"	9	**4**	8	7	28
October 15	María Eugenia Ritó	Balada	Cristian Castro – "Por Amarte Así"	10	**7**	10	9	36
October 15	Nicole Neumann	Balada	Ricky Martin – "Tal Vez"	10	**9**	10	9	38
October 15	Eunice Castro	Balada	Ricky Martin – "Te Extraño, Te Olvido, Te Amo"	8	**4**	5	4	21
October 15	Iliana Calabró	Balada	Enrique Iglesias – "Experiencia Religiosa"	8	**4**	6	5	23
October 15	Silvina Luna	Balada	Franco de Vita – "Te Amo"	10	**6**	9	9	34
October 15	Vanina Escudero	Balada	Luis Miguel – "La Incondicional"	8	**4**	6	5	23
October 20	Rocío Guirao Díaz	Latin hits	Chayanne – "Provócame"	9	5	**8**	7	29
October 20	Laura Oliva	Latin hits	Shakira – "Ojos Así"	9	5	**9**	7	30
October 20	Silvina Escudero	Latin hits	Shakira – "Ciega, Sordomuda"	9	6	**9**	8	32
October 20	Vanina Escudero	Latin hits	Ricky Martin – "Dime Que Me Quieres"	10	7	**10**	9	36
October 22	Nicole Neumann	Latin hits	Chayanne – "Baila Baila"	8	5	**8**	8	29
October 22	Tití Fernández	Latin hits	Luis Miguel – "Ahora Te Puedes Marchar"	9	5	**7**	8	29
October 22	María Eugenia Ritó	Latin hits	Thalía – "Piel Morena"	8	5	**8**	8	29
October 22	Iliana Calabró	Latin hits	Paulina Rubio – "Y Yo Sigo Aquí"	8	4	**8**	7	27
October 22	Silvina Luna	Latin hits	Juan Luis Guerra 440 – "Me Sube la Bilirrubina"	—	—	—	—	—
October 22	Matías Alé	Latin hits	Luis Miguel – "Será Que No Me Amas"	7	2	**4**	4	17
October 27	Laura Oliva	Kings of pop	Michael Jackson – "They Don't Care About Us"	10	7	10	**10**	37
October 27	Silvina Luna	Kings of pop	Michael Jackson – "Black or White"	10	5	8	**9**	32
October 29	Nicole Neumann	Kings of pop	Madonna – "Hung Up"	9	5	9	**8**	31
October 29	María Eugenia Ritó	Kings of pop	Madonna – "Give It to Me"	9	7	9	**10**	35
October 29	Tití Fernández	Kings of pop	—	—	—	—	—	—
October 29	Rocío Guirao Díaz	Kings of pop	Madonna – "Like a Prayer"	8	6	9	**9**	32
October 29	Silvina Escudero	Kings of pop	Michael Jackson – "Thriller"	9	5	8	**7**	29
October 29	Iliana Calabró	Kings of pop	Michael Jackson – "Billie Jean"	9	5	7	**8**	29
October 29	Vanina Escudero	Kings of pop	Madonna – "Don't Tell Me"	10	7	10	**10**	37

=== November ===
Caribbean music, Fantasy, Street music and Argentine hits
Date	Celebrity	Theme	Song	Score				Total
Date	Celebrity	Theme	Song	Graciela	Anibal	Reina	Valeria	Total
November 3	María Eugenia Ritó	Caribbean music	Chichí Peralta – "Procura"	**9**	7	10	10	36
November 3	Vanina Escudero	Caribbean music	Celia Cruz and Gloria Estefan – "Tres Gotas De Agua Bendita"	**8**	6	10	9	33
November 3	Laura Oliva	Caribbean music	Elvis Crespo – "Suavemente"	**8**	5	8	8	29
November 3	Iliana Calabró	Caribbean music	Celia Cruz – "Que le Den Candela"	**9**	8	10	10	37
November 5	Nicole Neumann	Caribbean music	Kaoma – "Chorando Se Foi"	**8**	6	8	8	30
November 5	Rocío Guirao Díaz	Caribbean music	Kaoma – "Dançando Lambada"	**8**	7	9	9	33
November 5	Silvina Escudero	Caribbean music	Elvis Crespo – "Tu Sonrisa"	**9**	6	9	9	33
November 5	Silvina Luna	Caribbean music	Dark Latin Groove – "Acuyuyé"	**10**	6	8	9	33
November 10	Rocío Guirao Díaz	Fantasy	Beyoncé featuring Jay-Z – "Crazy in Love"	10	**7**	10	10	37
November 10	Iliana Calabró	Fantasy	Donna Summer – "On the Radio"	9	**5**	8	9	31
November 10	Laura Oliva	Fantasy	Aerosmith – "Cryin'"	10	**5**	9	9	33
November 10	María Eugenia Ritó	Fantasy	Gloria Gaynor – "I Will Survive"	9	**6**	9	9	33
November 12	Silvina Luna	Fantasy	Aerosmith – "Eat the Rich"	10	**5**	8	8	31
November 12	Silvina Escudero	Fantasy	Shakira featuring Wyclef Jean – "Hips Don't Lie"	10	**6**	10	10	36
November 12	Vanina Escudero	Fantasy	The Black Eyed Peas – "Pump It"	10	**6**	10	10	36
November 17	Silvina Luna	Street music	É o Tchan! – "Dança do Ventre"	10	6	**9**	9	34
November 17	Silvina Escudero	Street music	Madonna featuring Justin Timberlake and Timbaland – "4 Minutes"	10	6	**9**	9	34
November 17	Vanina Escudero	Street music	Vico C – "La Vecinita"	8	6	**9**	9	32
November 17	María Eugenia Ritó	Street music	Asa de Águia – "Dança do Vampiro"	9	5	**9**	9	32
November 17	Rocío Guirao Díaz	Street music	Wisin & Yandel – "Rakata"	9	7	**10**	10	36
November 17	Laura Oliva	Street music	Ricky Martin featuring Daddy Yankee – "Drop It on Me"	10	7	**9**	10	36
November 24	Ricardo Fort	Argentine hits	Ráfaga – "Mentirosa"	10	6	9	**9**	34
November 24	María Eugenia Ritó	Argentine hits	Rodrigo – "Soy Cordobés"	8	6	10	**10**	34
November 26	Rocío Guirao Díaz	Argentine hits	La Mona Jiménez – "Beso a Beso"	8	6	8	**9**	31
November 26	Silvina Escudero	Argentine hits	Gilda – "No Me Arrepiento de Este Amor"	6	8	10	**10**	34
November 26	Silvina Luna	Argentine hits	Walter Olmos – "Por lo Que Yo Te Quiero"	9	8	9	**9**	35
November 26	Matías Alé	Argentine hits	Rodrigo – "Y Voló Voló"	5	5	8	**8**	26
November 26	Adabel Guerrero	Argentine hits	Rodrigo – "Como Olvidarla"	10	8	10	**10**	38
November 26	Laura Oliva	Argentine hits	La Mona Jiménez – "El Bum Bum"	10	8	10	**10**	38

==== Re-entry ====
Re-entry
Date	Celebrity	Style	Song
November 19	Adabel Guerrero	Pole dance	Lenny Kravitz – "Always on the Run"
November 19	Belén Francese	Pole dance	Aerosmith – "Love in an Elevator
November 19	Dallys Ferreira	Pole dance	INXS – "New Sensation"
November 19	Fabián Gianola	Pole dance	Five – "Everybody Get Up"
November 19	Anabel Cherubito	Pole dance	Mötley Crüe – "Girls, Girls, Girls"
November 19	Matías Alé	Pole dance	AC/DC – "You Shook Me All Night Long"
November 19	Nazarena Vélez	Pole dance	Bon Jovi – "You Give Love a Bad Name"
November 19	Pablo Ruiz	Pole dance	Warrant – "Cherry Pie"
November 19	Ricardo Fort	Pole dance	AC/DC – "Back in Black"

=== December ===
Reggaeton
Date	Celebrity	Theme	Song	Score				Total
Date	Celebrity	Theme	Song	Graciela	Anibal	Reina	Valeria	Total
December 3	Ricardo Fort	Reggaeton	Daddy Yankee – "Ella Me Levantó"	10	6	9	9	34
December 3	María Eugenia Ritó	Reggaeton	Latin Fresh – "Bata Bata"	10	7	10	10	37
December 3	Adabel Guerrero	Reggaeton	Wisin & Yandel – "Abusadora"	9	8	10	10	37
December 3	Laura Oliva	Reggaeton	Daddy Yankee – "Pose"	9	7	9	9	34
December 3	Silvina Luna	Reggaeton	Daddy Yankee – "Rompe"	10	6	9	9	34
December 3	Vanina Escudero	Reggaeton	Héctor & Tito – "Baila Morena"	8	5	9	9	31
December 3	Rocío Guirao Díaz	Reggaeton	Wisin & Yandel – "Ahora Es"	8	6	10	10	34

==== Duel ====
Duel
	Date	Celebrity	Theme	Song
1 s t D u e l	December 8	Rocío Guirao Díaz	Merengue	Los Hermanos Rosario – "Este Fin de Semana"
1 s t D u e l	December 8	Silvina Luna	Merengue	Elvis Crespo – "Tu Sonrisa"
1 s t D u e l	December 8	Silvina Escudero	Merengue	La Banda XXI – "Esa Chica Tiene Swing"
1 s t D u e l	December 8	Adabel Guerrero	Merengue	Elvis Crespo – "Suavemente"
1 s t D u e l	December 8	Ricardo Fort	Merengue	Juan Luis Guerra 440 – "La Bilirubina"
1 s t D u e l	December 8	María Eugenia Ritó	Merengue	Jean Carlos – "Quiéreme"
2 n d D u e l	December 10	María Eugenia Ritó	Cumbia	Amar Azul – "Porque Te Amo"
2 n d D u e l	December 10	Adabel Guerrero	Cumbia	Gilda – "Paisaje"
2 n d D u e l	December 10	Ricardo Fort	Cumbia	Sombras – "Pega la Vuelta"
2 n d D u e l	December 10	Silvina Escudero	Cumbia	Ráfaga – "Ritmo Caliente"
2 n d D u e l	December 10	Rocío Guirao Díaz	Cumbia	Lía Crucet – "Cumbia Apretadita"

==== Semifinal and Final ====
Semifinal and Final
	Date	Celebrity	Theme	Song	Votes				
	Date	Celebrity	Theme	Song	Graciela	Anibal	Reina	Valeria	Result
1 s t S e m i f i n a l	December 14	María Eugenia Ritó	Kings of Pop	Madonna – "Give It to Me"	1	1	1	1	**1**
1 s t S e m i f i n a l	December 14	Jorge Ibañéz	Kings of Pop	Michael Jackson – "Beat It"	—	—	—	—	—
1 s t S e m i f i n a l	December 14	María Eugenia Ritó	Balada	Cristian Castro – "Por Amarte Así"	—	1	—	—	—
1 s t S e m i f i n a l	December 14	Ricardo Fort	Balada	Julie Covington – "No Llores Por Mí Argentina"	1	—	1	1	**1**
1 s t S e m i f i n a l	December 14	María Eugenia Ritó	Latin hits	Shakira – "Te Aviso, Te Anuncio (Tango)"	—	1	1	1	**1**
1 s t S e m i f i n a l	December 14	Jorge Ibañéz	Latin hits	David Bisbal – "Lloraré las Penas"	1	—	—	—	—
1 s t S e m i f i n a l	December 14	María Eugenia Ritó	Argentine hits	Rodrigo – "Soy Cordobés"	1	1	1	1	**1**
1 s t S e m i f i n a l	December 14	Ricardo Fort	Argentine hits	—	—	—	—	—	—
2 n d S e m i f i n a l	December 15	Silvina Escudero	Latin hits	Shakira featuring Alejandro Sanz – "La Tortura"	1	—	1	—	**1**
2 n d S e m i f i n a l	December 15	Rocío Guirao Díaz	Latin hits	Chayanne – "Provócame"	—	1	—	1	—
2 n d S e m i f i n a l	December 15	Silvina Escudero	Balada	Ricardo Arjona – "Dime Que No"	—	—	—	—	—
2 n d S e m i f i n a l	December 15	Rocío Guirao Díaz	Classics of Argentine rock	Fabiana Cantilo – "Mary Poppins y El Deshollinador"	1	1	1	1	**1**
2 n d S e m i f i n a l	December 15	Silvina Escudero	Argentine hits	Gilda – "No Me Arrepiento de Este Amor"	1	1	—	1	**1**
2 n d S e m i f i n a l	December 15	Rocío Guirao Díaz	Argentine hits	La Mona Jiménez – "Beso a Beso"	—	—	1	—	—
2 n d S e m i f i n a l	December 15	Silvina Escudero	Pop gold	Kylie Minogue – "Can't Get You Out of My Head"	1	—	1	—	—
2 n d S e m i f i n a l	December 15	Rocío Guirao Díaz	Pop gold	Christina Aguilera – "Dirrty"	—	1	—	1	**1**
F i n a l	December 17	Silvina Escudero	Caribbean music	Banda XXI – "Esa Chica Tiene Swing"	—	1	—	—	—
F i n a l	December 17	Jorge Ibáñez	Caribbean music	Rubén Rada – "Aparte de Ti Tu Boca"	1	—	1	1	**1**
F i n a l	December 17	Silvina Escudero	Musical	Shakira – "Ciega, Sordomuda"	—	—	—	—	—
F i n a l	December 17	Ricardo Fort	Musical	Sarah Brightman and Michael Crawford – "The Phantom of the Opera"	1	1	1	1	**1**
F i n a l	December 17	Silvina Escudero	Pole dance	Mötley Crüe – "Girls, Girls, Girls"	—	1	1	1	**1**
F i n a l	December 17	Jorge Ibáñez	Pole dance	AC/DC – "Back in Black"	1	—	—	—	—
F i n a l	December 17	Silvina Escudero	Reggaeton	Héctor & Tito – "Baila Morena"	—	1	1	1	**1**
F i n a l	December 17	Jorge Ibáñez	Reggaeton	Daddy Yankee – "Ella Me Levantó"	1	—	—	—	—
