= Silvina Luna =

Argentine model, actress and vedette (1980–2023)

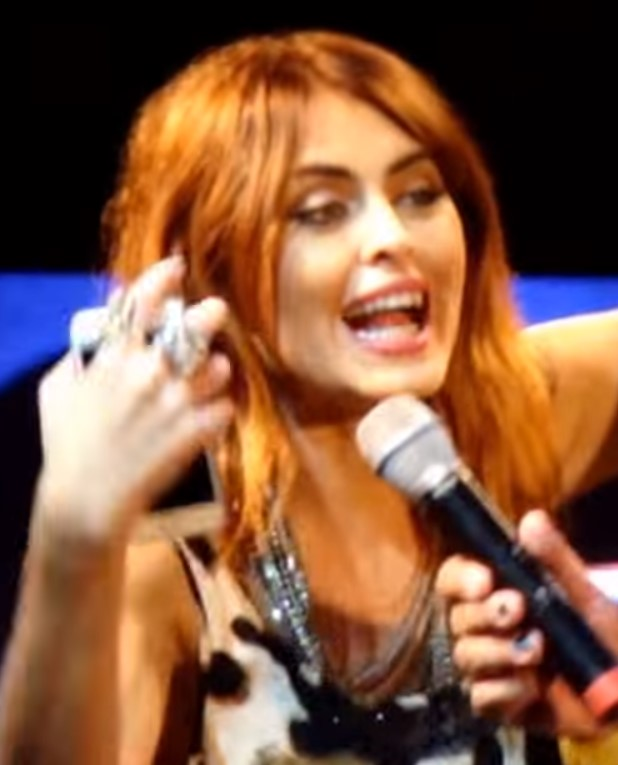
- Luna in 2015
- Born: Silvina Noelia Luna; 21 June 1980; Rosario, Santa Fe, Argentina
- Died: 31 August 2023 (aged 43); Buenos Aires, Argentina
- Occupations: Model; actress; vedette
- Modeling information
- Hair color: Brunette
- Eye color: Blue
- Agency: Modeling agency of Ricardo Piñeiro

Silvina Noelia Luna (21 June 1980 – 31 August 2023) was an Argentine model, actress and vedette.

== Career ==
After finishing school at the age of 17, she moved to Buenos Aires and worked as a secretary and a model. She later lived in Miami for a year, before returning to Argentina, where she appeared as a participant on Big Brother 2.

In later years she worked with the modelling agency of Ricardo Piñeiro, and participated in the reality diving competition Celebrity Splash!

Luna took theatre classes with Julio Chávez, and guest-starred on television shows.

=== Magazine appearances ===
- Cover of the Argentine Maxim magazine
- Cover of Interviú magazine
- Pages of Harper's Bazaar
- Pages of Vogue

== Personal life and death ==
Silvina Luna was born in Rosario on 21 June 1980. She started her professional life as a model and promoter. She reached national fame in 2001 when she participated in Big Brother Argentina, where she ended up in second place. After her reality appearance, she continued studying theater. She participated in many plays such as El champán las pone mimosas, Más que amigos, Abracadabra and Explosivos. She also appeared in TV shows such as Los Roldán and Casados con hijos. She was a participant in other reality shows such as the Argentinian version of Dancing with the stars in 2006, 2007 and 2017. In 2017, she was converted to Buddhism from Christianity.

In July 2014, Luna was hospitalized with kidney stones. She blamed the problem on her cosmetic surgeon, Anibal Lotocki, who she said used methacrylate on her buttocks. Luna had two cosmetic surgeries in 2011, both performed by Lotocki. After these surgical procedures, she started to have health problems and after several studies, it was discovered that she had high levels of calcium in her blood, which later was confirmed to be a consequence of methacrylate poisoning. Three years later, in 2015, she was on dialysis from 2016 up until her death. The cause of kidney failure is not very clear but appears to have been an autoimmune condition like adjuvant-induced autoimmune syndrome (ASIA) due to methacrylate.

On 31 August 2023, Luna died after spending 79 days in hospital on life support. Her ashes were scattered in a Buddhist ceremony in Rosario. She had been admitted to the Hospital Italiano de Buenos Aires on 13 July 2023. Luna had been awaiting a kidney transplant, which could not be performed due to various infections she had contracted in the weeks and days leading up to her death.

== Theater shows ==
- Vedettísima (2009)
- El Champagne las Pone Mimosas. (2005)
- Diferente. (2003)
- La noche de las pistolas frías. (2002)

== Selected TV appearances ==
- El hotel de los famosos (2022)
- La Pelu (2012)
- Gran Hermano 2011 (2011)
- El Capo (2007)
- Son de Fierro (2007)
- Bailando por un sueño (2006)
- Los Gladiadores de Pompeya (2006)
- Amor en Custodia (2005)
- Quién es el Jefe? (2005)
- El Patrón de la Vereda (2005)
- Don Francisco Presenta (2004)
- No Hay 2 Sin 3 (2004)
- Los Roldán (2004)
- La Peluquería (2003)
- Gran Hermano 2 - Big Brother Argentina 2 (2001; participant)

Reality shows
Year	Title	Role	Result	Notes
2001	Gran Hermano 2	Contestant	Runner-up / ~~7th eliminated~~	
2005	Odisea, en busca del tesoro perdido	¿?	¿?	
2006	Bailando por un Sueño 2	Contestant	7th eliminated	
2007	Odisea, aventura Argentina	Blue Team Contestant	2nd eliminated	
2009	El Musical de tus Sueños	Contestant	15th eliminated	
2010-11	Gran Hermano 2011	Host		Some segment
2013	Celebrity Splash!	Contestant	Eliminated in Round 1 – Part 4	1 episode
2014	Tu Cara me Suena (season 2)	Guest contestant by Fernando Dente	6th place	Gala 33
2017	Bailando 2017	Contestant	8th eliminated	
2020	Divina comida	Contestant and host in week 5	5th Place	5 episodes
2022	El Hotel de los Famosos	Contestant	6th eliminated / ~~Evacued~~	33 episodes
2022	El Hotel de los Famosos	Candidate in repechage	Eliminated	33 episodes
2022	El Hotel de los Famosos	V.I.P. guest		33 episodes
