= Eleonora Cassano =

Argentine ballet dancer and teacher

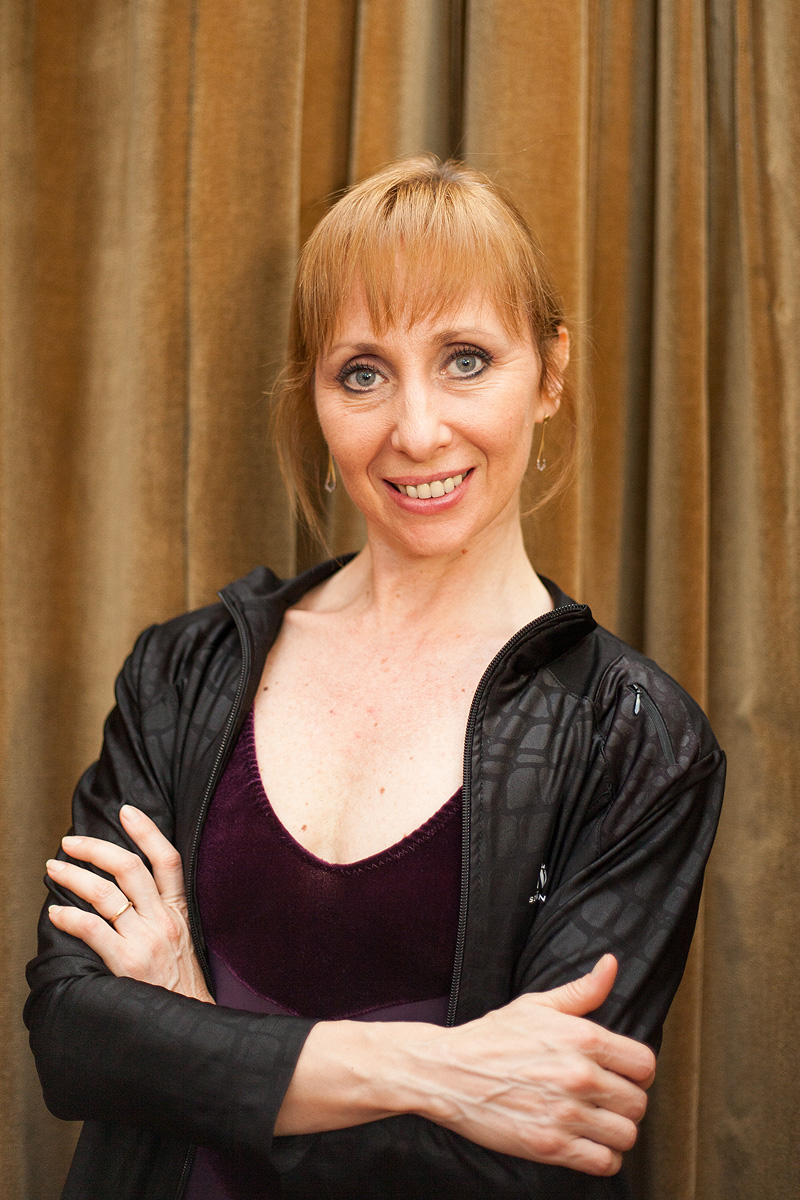
Cassano in 2012

Eleonora Cassano (born January 5, 1965, in Boedo, Buenos Aires) is an Argentine ballet dancer and teacher. She is known for being the dancing partner of Julio Bocca since 1989.

Cassano studied in the Teatro Colón's Advanced Arts Institute and begins to work in the Teresa Carreño Foundation of Venezuela. In 1996, she started her career in the musical theatre with the plays La Cassano en el Maipo and Cassano dancing. Over the following years she would continue dancing in other musicals such as La Duarte, where she played as Evita and Cinderella Tango Club.

In the year 2000 she participated in the international Millennium Day event, dancing in Ushuaia with Bocca and the Ballet Argentino in a performance broadcast to the whole world.

She also participated as a guest judge on 2012 in the reality dance competition Bailando por un Sueño in "ShowMatch", hosted by Marcelo Tinelli.
