= Virginia Gallardo =

Argentine politician (born 1985)

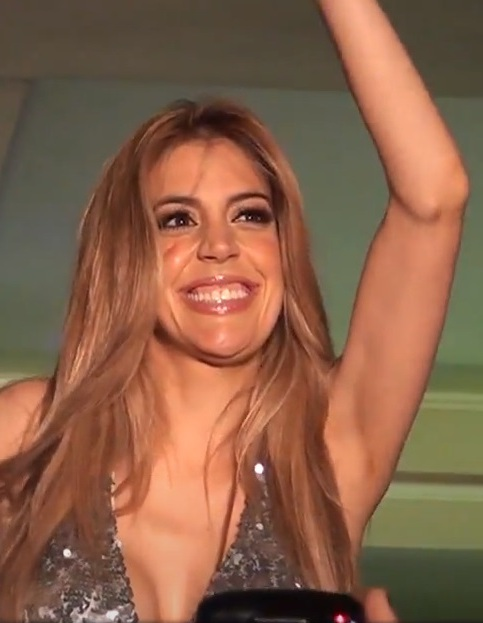
- Gallardo in 2013

Member of the Chamber of Deputies
- Incumbent
- Assumed office 10 December 2025
- Constituency: Corrientes

Personal details
- Born: 25 September 1985 (age 40)
- Party: La Libertad Avanza
- Domestic partner: Ricardo Fort (2009–2010)

Virginia Gallardo (born 25 September 1985) is an Argentine actress, model and politician who was elected member of the Chamber of Deputies in 2025. From 2009 to 2010, she was in a relationship with Ricardo Fort.
