= Ana Acosta =

Argentine actress and comedian

- Born: 4 July 1961 (age 64); Buenos Aires, Argentina
- Occupation(s): Actress, comedian
- Awards: Martín Fierro Award (1991); ACE Award (1995); Sea Star Award (1996)

Ana Acosta (born 4 July 1961) is an Argentine actress and comedian.

== Biography ==
Ana Acosta was born in Buenos Aires on 4 July 1961, to a family of Canarian descent. She studied at the National Theater Conservatory, and began appearing in productions such as Los Borgia, a musical comedy by Pepe Cibrián Campoy. She moved to television in 1990, when Jorge Guinzburg invited her to join the cast of Peor es nada. She appeared on the program until 1993, receiving the Martín Fierro Award for artistic revelation in 1991.

She subsequently appeared in numerous plays, including the one-woman shows Cómo se rellena un bikini salvaje and My Brilliant Divorce. She received ACE and Sea Star Awards for her performance in the former.

Her mother, also named Ana, died in 2015.

In January 2021, Acosta appeared together with her daughter Talía in Casa Matriz. The play, written by Diana Raznovich and directed by Nicolás Pérez Costa, features a woman hiring several models of surrogate mother to help celebrate her 30th birthday. Acosta had previously played the part of the daughter in a 1993 production.

== Works ==
=== Theater ===
- 1983: Inkari
- 1985: The House of Bernarda Alba
- 1986: Los Borgia
- 1987: Aquí no podemos hacerlo
- 1987: El fantasma del cañaveral
- 1989: Las invasiones inglesas
- 1991: Las dulces niñas
- 1993: Casa Matriz
- 1995–1997: Cómo se rellena un bikini salvaje
- 1998: Preferiría no hacerlo
- 1998–1999: Boeing-Boeing
- 1999: Desangradas en glamour. Director: José María Muscari
- 2001: El último de los amantes ardientes
- 2001–2002: Alicia Maravilla
- 2003: The Open Couple. With Daniel Fanego. Director: José María Muscari
- 2003–2004: Cómo se rellena un bikini salvaje. One-woman show.
- 2004–2005: El show de las divorciadas
- 2005: Soltero...¡y con dos viudas!
- 2007: My Brilliant Divorce. One-woman show.
- 2008: Bailarín compadrito
- 2009: Las déspotas
- 2009: Mapas de movimiento. Dancer.
- 2009: Pijamas
- 2009: ¡Socorro! Malcriados
- 2010–2011: My Brilliant Divorce
- 2011–2012: Delicadamente inmoral
- 2012: La noche de la basura
- 2013: El conventillo de la Paloma
- 2013: Lo mejor de la copla. Musical
- 2013: Primeras damas del musical
- 2014: Lifting
- 2015: Noche De Paz
- 2016: Espíritu infiel
- 2017: Menopausia
- 2018: Chorros
- 2018: Entretelones
- 2019: El show de los cuernos
- 2021: Casa Matriz

=== Film ===
- 1998: La herencia del tío Pepe ... Lili
- 1993: El caso María Soledad ... La rubia
- 2019: A oscuras

=== Internet ===
- 2010: Yo soy virgen. Web series.

=== Television ===
- 1990–1993: Peor es nada
- 1994: La piñata
- 1996: Como pan caliente
- 1997: Archivo negro
- 1998: Rompeportones
- 2002–2003: Ricos y sabrosos
- 2003: Son amores
- 2006: Chiquititas sin fin
- 2006: Oye mi canto
- 2006: You Are the One ... Beatriz Simpson de Uribe
- 2007: Bailando por un Sueño

== Awards ==
- 1991: Martín Fierro Award for artistic revelation for her work on Peor es nada
- 1995: ACE Award for the play Cómo rellenar una bikini salvaje
- 1996: Sea Star Award for best female lead performance, for the play Cómo rellenar una bikini salvaje (which also received the award for best one-person show)
