= Fátima Flórez =

Argentine actress and comedian

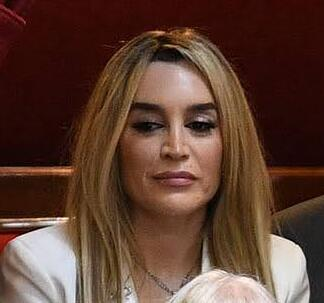
- Flórez in 2023
- Born: María Eugenia Florez; 3 February 1978 (age 47); Olivos, Buenos Aires Province, Argentina
- Occupations: Actress; impersonator; comedian
- Years active: 2005–present
- Spouse: Norberto Marcos Berenstein (m. 2001; div. 2023)
- Partner: Javier Milei (2023–2024)

Fátima Flórez (née María Eugenia Florez; born 3 February 1978) is an Argentine actress and comedian. She was the girlfriend of Javier Milei, president of Argentina, from 2023 to 2024.

Flórez is mainly known for having been the host alongside Gabriela Sobrado of Plan TV, and for her imitations of former president Cristina Fernández de Kirchner in Periodismo para todos. She has won two Martín Fierro Awards (2013 and 2015), thanks to her impersonations in Journalism for Everyone and ShowMatch, while for her work in theater she has won four Carlos Awards, five Estrella de Mar Awards and five VOS Awards and is the only artist from Argentina who has won three golds (two Carlos de Oro and one Estrella de Mar de Oro) in theater seasons.

== Early life ==
María Eugenia Florez was born on 3 February 1978 (Note: Although some sources say she was born in 1981, others say she was born on 3 February 1978, like her 2013 and 2016 business contracts with her then-husband (Boletín Oficial de la República Argentina).) in Olivos, Buenos Aires Province. She lived there throughout her childhood until high school. She played hockey from the ages of 6 to 14. Her father was an architect and her mother a geography teacher. She has a sister two years older.

During elementary school she would do impressions of her teachers and professors, particularly her 5th grade teacher who had a particular way of speaking.

== Career ==
She started her career by studying and taking acting, dancing and singing classes. Meanwhile, she performed imitations as a hobby, where her first character was Xuxa.

She began at the age of 17, taking part as a dancer and choreography assistant in different works directed by Pepe Cibrián Campoy, such as “The Hunchback of Paris”, “Drácula” and “King David”.

In the year 2000 she joined the musical group Las Primas (Las Primas del 2000). In 2001, at the age of 23, she traveled with them to Peru, where they participated in the TV program La Paisana Jacinta, and it was there that she married her former husband and first boyfriend, Norberto Marcos (about 25 years her senior), who at that time produced said women's group. He discovered her gift as a mimic in privacy. Because Norberto is very devoted to the Virgin of Fátima, he advised her to give herself this artistic name, which he considered would have a greater impact on her audience.

In 2005 she was hired by Carlos Perciavalle as the main star, to lead his show “Revivamos el Concert” together with him. She also joined the cast of the program "No hay 2 sin 3" , along with Pablo Granados, Pachu Peña and Freddy Villareal. Likewise, she had the opportunity to lead the play “The World of Laughter” and El Viaje del Humor, along with Jorge Corona, where in addition to being a dancer she began to stand out for performing some imitations.

She served as co-host and comedian in the program From 9 to 12, along with Maby Wells and Macu Mazucca, where she was characterized by imitating Natalia Fassi; She participated in the program "Laughter is beautiful", together with Freddy Villarreal, and in the cycle "In the manner of Sofovich" with Gerardo Sofovich. In addition, she served as a comedian in the program "El muro infernal", along with Marley.

In 2009, she was part of the program De lo Nuestro lo peor... y lo mejor program hosted by Fabián Gianola that was broadcast on Channel 13, where she played "the computer". That same year she stood out for being part of the program Showmatch, hosted by Marcelo Tinelli, within the segment Gran Cuñado and Gran Cuñado VIP, where she personified Nacha Guevara, Viviana Canosa and Silvia Süller.

In 2011, she was host of the program Plan TV broadcast by eltrece, together with Gabriela Sobrado, where, in addition to hosting, she performs various imitations.

In 2012 she was part of the program Periodismo para todos broadcast by eltrece, hosted by Jorge Lanata, where she stood out for imitating the Argentine president Cristina Fernández de Kirchner among other political figures. But after three years of participating, the production of the program decided to remove the humor section, focusing more on journalistic reports.

In 2013 she led her own show "Fatima Florez es Única", under the artistic direction of her then-husband Norberto Marcos and the production of Daniel Faroni at the Provincial Theater of Mar del Plata, in which she played 30 different characters. The show continued in Buenos Aires, Villa Carlos Paz and on tour around the interior of the country.

In 2014 she participated in Showmatch, doing various imitations of public figures that were part of the contest Bailando 2014, parodying both the participants and the members of the jury. Also that same year she made his film debut with Luis Scalela and Carlos Mentasti in the film "Bañeros 4: Los Rompeolas", where she played Kiara, the owner of an aquarium who must prevent her property from being stolen.

In 2016, she was again part of Showmatch in the segment Gran Cuñado, in which she stood out for imitating the former president Cristina Fernández de Kirchner, the governor of Buenos Aires María Eugenia Vidal, the vice president Gabriela Michetti, the deputy Elisa Carrió and Vicky Xipolitakis together with José Otavis.

In 2017, she stood out as a comedian on the program Susana Giménez, performing imitations in the sketch of "The Public Employee" as Cristina Fernández de Kirchner, Silvia Suller, Gladys "La bomba tucumana" and the same Susana Giménez; she also impersonated guests, performed musicals and medleys.

She can imitate more than 100 characters. She frequently appears as a guest on TV interviews, magazine releases, game and entertainment shows, etc.

== Personal life ==
Flórez met Javier Milei on a chat show in December 2022, although she was still married to her husband at the time. Nevertheless, they started dating in July 2023.

== Theater ==
| Year | Title |
|---|---|
| 2005 | Let's revive the Concert |
| 2005 | The journey of Humor |
| 2006 | Garcia, the one with the guide |
| 2007 | The last virgin Argentine (prostitute character) |
| 2008 | Varieté for María Elena |
| 2009 | Celebrate Laughter |
| 2010 | Thanks to the Village |
| 2011 | The Great Burlesque |
| 2012 | The Magazine of Buenos Aires |
| 2013–2014 | Fátima Flórez is Unique |
| 2014–2015 | Fatima for all |
| 2016–2017 | Geniuses - the 1000 and a Fatima |
| 2017–2018 | Fatima Superstar |
| 2018–2019 | Fatima is Magical |
| 2020–2022 | Fatima is Chameleonic |

== Television ==
| Year | Title | Role | Channel | Notes |
|---|---|---|---|---|
| 2009–2011 | De lo nuestro lo peor... y lo mejor | Imitator | eltrece | Sporadic participations |
| 2009–2016 | Showmatch | Imitator | eltrece | Sporadic participations |
| 2010 | La risa es hermosa | Imitator | eltrece | |
| 2012–2015 | Periodismo para todos | Imitator | eltrece | Personifies Cristina Fernández de Kirchner |
| 2011–2017 | Plan TV | Host and imitator | eltrece | Along with Gabriela Sobrado |
| 2014 | BdV | Invited panelist | Magazine | |
| 2014 | Soñando por Cantar 2014 | Special guest | eltrece | |
| 2014 | Bailando por un Sueño 2014 | Competitor | eltrece | 14th eliminated |
| 2015 | La Mesa está lista | Special guest | eltrece | |
| 2015, 2018 | El diario de Mariana | Special guest | eltrece | |
| 2016 | Hacelo Felíz | Invited jury | eltrece | |
| 2016, 2020, 2021 | LAM | Invited panelist | eltrece | |
| 2016 | Como Anillo al Dedo | Special guest | eltrece | |
| 2015, 2016, 2018, 2019, 2020, 2021 | Almorzando con Mirtha Legrand | Special guest | eltrece | |
| 2017 | Susana Giménez | copycat | Telefe | Participation in skits and imitations |
| 2017 | Podemos Hablar | Special guest | Telefe | |
| 2018 | Tengo que decir | Special guest | America TV | |
| 2018 | Los Especialistas del Show | Special guest | eltrece | |
| 2018 | Pampita Online | Special guest | Telefe | |
| 2018 | Hay Que Ver | Special guest | elnueve | |
| 2018 | Intrusos en el espectáculo | Invited panelist | America TV | |
| 2018 | La Tribuna de Guido | Invited panelist | eltrece | |
| 2018, 2021 | Polémica en el Bar | Invited panelist | America TV | |
| 2018, 2019 | Cortá por Lozano | Invited panelist | Telefe | |
| 2019 | Showmatch 30 años: Súper Bailando 2019 | Herself | eltrece | Special participation in Salsa trio |
| 2019 | La Peña de Morfi | Special guest | Telefe | |
| 2019 | Pamela a la tarde | Special guest | America TV | |
| 2019 | Hoy nos toca a las diez | Special guest | Canal de la ciudad | |
| 2019 | Pasapalabra | Invited panelist | eltrece | |
| 2020 | Tu Fabuloso Fin de Semana | Special guest | elnueve | |
| 2019, 2020 | La Noche de Mirtha Legrand | Special guest | eltrece | |
| 2020 | Corte y Confección | Special guest | eltrece | |
| 2020, 2021 | Bendita | Special guest | elnueve | |
| 2020 | Cantando 2020 | Herself | eltrece | multiple stakes |
| 2020 | Implacables | Invited panelist | elnueve | |
| 2020 | Confrontados | Special guest | elnueve | |
| 2020, 2021 | Flor de Equipo | Special guest | Telefe | |
| 2021 | Fantino a la tarde | Special guest | America TV | |
| 2021 | Santo especial | Invited panelist | America TV | |
| 2021 | El Club de las Divorciadas | Invited panelist | eltrece | |
| 2021 | Showmatch: Bailando por un Sueño 2021 | She herself | eltrece | Multiple stakes |
| 2022 | Quién es la máscara? | Competitor | Telefe | 13th removed |

== Cinema ==
| Year | Film | Character | director |
|---|---|---|---|
| 2014 | Bathrooms 4: The Breakwaters | Kiara | Rudolph Ledo |

== Characters ==
- Alejandra Maglietti
- Andrea Rincon
- Aschira
- Adabel Guerrero
- Barbie Velez
- Beatrice Solomon
- French Nativity
- Britney Spears
- Carina Zampini
- Carmen Barbieri
- Catherine Fulop
- Charlotte Caniggia
- Claribel Medina
- Cristina Kirchner
- Celia Cruz
- Chinese Skunk
- Coki Ramírez
- Emerald Miter
- Gabriela Michetti
- Gabriela Sabatini
- Gladys Florimonte (as Zulma of Tinelli)
- Gladys, the Tucuman bombshell
- Gilda
- Graciela Alfano
- Iliana Calabro
- Jennifer Lopez
- Jessica Cirio
- Justin Bieber
- Karina, the Little Princess
- Karina Jelinek
- Karina Rabolini
- The Tucuman Bomb
- Lady Gaga
- Lali Esposito
- Laura Fidalgo
- Amaia Montero
- Lia Crucet
- Liza Minnelli
- Lita de Lazari
- Lilita Carrio
- Lucia Galan
- Luis Miguel
- Madonna
- Marcela Colonel
- Marge Simpson
- Maria Eugenia Ritó
- Maria Eugenia Vidal
- Mariana Fabbiani
- Mariana Nannis
- Marixa Balli
- Marta Sanchez
- Maru Botana
- Mercedes Sosa
- Michael Jackson
- Mariela "Mimi" Alvarado
- Mirtha Legrand
- Moria Casán
- Nacha Guevara
- Natalia Fassi
- Panam
- Patricia Sosa
- Patricia Bullrich
- Paula Chavez
- Paulina Rubio
- Rafaella Carrá
- Shakira
- Silvia Süller
- Silvina Escudero
- Soledad Pastorutti
- Soledad Silveyra
- Susana Giménez
- Susana Roccasalvo
- Tina Turner
- Thalía
- Teresa Parodi
- Tita Merello
- Valeria Lynch
- Vicky Xipolitakis
- Viviana Canosa
- Xuxa
- Yanina Latorre

== Awards and nominations ==
=== Television Awards ===
Martin Fierro Awards
| Year | Category | Nominated Work | Result | Ref. |
|---|---|---|---|---|
| 2011 | Best humorous work | Of ours the worst and the best | Nominated | |
| 2013 | Best humorous work | Journalism for all | Won | |
| 2015 | Best humorous work | Journalism for all | Won | |

Tato Awards
| Year | Category | Nominated Work | Result | Ref. |
|---|---|---|---|---|
| 2013 | Best Comedy Work | Journalism for everyone | Nominated | |

=== Theater Awards ===
Carlos Awards
| Year | Category | Nominated Work | Result | Ref. |
|---|---|---|---|---|
| 2014 | Best Comedy Show | Fátima Florez, is unique in the Villa | Won | |
| 2014 | Best music hall | Fátima Florez, is unique in the Villa | Won | |
| 2014 | Best humorous work | Fátima Florez, is unique in the Villa | Nominated | |
| 2016 | Carlos de Oro Award | Fatima For All | Won | |
| 2016 | Best Musical Comedy | Fatima For All | Won | |
| 2017 | Best Musical Comedy | Geniuses, the thousand and one Fatima | Nominated | |

Starfish Awards
| Year | Category | Nominated Work | Result | Ref. |
|---|---|---|---|---|
| 2013 | Best music hall | Fátima Florez is unique | Nominated | |
| 2013 | Best Female Comedy | Fátima Florez is unique | Won | |
| 2015 | Best music hall | Fatima for everyone. I am so. | Won | |
| 2015 | Best Female Comedy | Fatima for everyone. I am so. | Won | |
| 2018 | Gold Starfish Award | Fatima Superstar | Won | |
| 2018 | Best music hall | Fatima Superstar | Nominated | |
| 2018 | Best Female Comedy | Fatima Superstar | Won | |

VOS Awards
| Year | Category | Nominated Work | Result | Ref. |
|---|---|---|---|---|
| 2014 | Consecration | Fátima is unique in the village | Nominated | |
| 2014 | Best Comedian | Fátima is unique in the village | Won | |
| 2016 | Best Female Comedian | Fatima for everyone | Nominated | |
| 2017 | Best actress | Genia, the thousand and one Fatima | Won | |
| 2019 | Best Variety Show | Fatima is magical | Won | |
| 2019 | Best Female Lead | Fatima is magical | Won | |
| 2019 | The perfect moment | Fatima is magical | Won | |
