= Gran Cuñado =

Comedian Martín Bossi parodies the Argentine president Cristina Fernández de Kirchner, next to TV host Marcelo Tinelli.

Gran Cuñado (in Spanish, "Big Brother-in-law") is a segment of the Argentine television programs Videomatch and Showmatch, hosted by Marcelo Tinelli. It consisted of a series of comedians characterized as Argentina's most prominent politicians. The segment was a parody of the reality show Big Brother, with the politicians staying at a "house" where they pretended to live, and a regular nomination process through which one participant was eliminated at a time.

== Overview ==
The imitations of politicians were made by various comedians of the program, disguised in ways that grotesquely mimicked the look of major Argentine politicians of the time. The scripts were written by cartoonist Cristian Dzwonik, known as "Nik". Their dialogues and behaviors were based on clichés made from well-known events or quotes of them. For example, the imitation of former president Néstor Kirchner frequently used the phrase ¿Qué te pasa Clarín, estás nervioso?! ("What's wrong Clarin, you're nervous?!"), reflecting the conflict between the Argentine government and Grupo Clarín. The specific phrase was used several times by Kirchner during a ceremony in the town of Tres de Febrero, shortly after his defeat in the elections at Catamarca. Another example, one of the first commercials by Francisco de Narváez used the slogan Votame, votate ("Vote me, vote yourself") which prompted his imitator to use other verbs in verbal forms like, or even nonsense phrases such as "Alica, Alicate".

The imitations were developed in two main contexts, the "house" and nominations; both parodies of similar procedures performed in the reality show Big Brother. The house showed politicians in a simulated environment of everyday life, where all of them would live together. There were discussions taking place, parties, jokes among politicians, etc. The house was also the place where it was announced which politicians were nominated to leave and which ones were not, which was used to show various reactions.

Groups of participants were nominated for eviction and viewer could vote by phone to decide who should "leave the house" and cease to be part of the program.

One of the drawbacks of the format of the program was that some politicians (like Cristina Fernandez and Macri) were played by the same comedian, which prevented both being used simultaneously. This was resolved by not nominating politicians in this situation at the same time (the composition of the groups nominated was not controllable by the public), and using an extra actor in the house without speech lines assigned.

The group of politicians elected in the beginning did not include Gabriela Michetti or Pino Solanas, who achieved notoriety soon after. The program office decided to include the imitations of Anita Martínez and Toti Ciliberto respectively, but only for scenes in the house without incorporating them into the system of nominations. It was also included an imitation of Venezuelan President Hugo Chávez, the only non-Argentine politician parodied in the program.

== Seasons ==
There were six editions of the show in total.

=== Gran Cuñado 1 (2001) ===
The first edition of Gran Cuñado started in 2001.

The politicians parodied were:

Name	Position	Actor/Actress
Carlos "Chacho" Álvarez	Ex-Vice-President of Argentina	Yayo Guridi
Fernando de la Rúa	Ex-President of Argentina	Freddy Villarreal
Domingo Cavallo	Minister of Economy	Campi
Elisa "Lilita" Carrió	Deputy of Chaco Province	Larry de Clay
Emir Yoma		Álvaro Navia (Waldo)
Erman González	Public Accountant	Sebastián Almada
Raúl Alfonsín		Rodrigo Rodríguez
Carlos Ruckauf	Governor of Buenos Aires Province	Daniel Bifulco
Cecilia Bolocco	Celebrity, wife of Carlos Menem	Roberto Peña
Carlos Menem	Ex-President of Argentina (1995-1999)	Unknown
Hugo Moyano	General Secretary of the Sindicato de Choferes de Camiones de Buenos Aires (Buenos Aires Truck Drivers' Syndicate)	Fernando Ramírez
María Julia Alsogaray		Pichu Straneo

=== Gran Cuñado 2 (2001) ===
In 2001, the second edition of the segment was held.

The politicians parodied were:

Name	Position	Actor
Inés Pertiné	First Lady of Argentina, wife of Fernando de la Rúa	Álvaro Navia (Waldo)
Antonio de la Rúa	Son of Fernando de la Rúa	Yayo Guridi
Aldo Rico	Military leader	Campi
Fernando de la Rúa	Ex-President of Argentina	Freddy Villarreal
Elisa "Lilita" Carrió		Larry de Clay
Zulema María Eva "Zulemita" Menem	Daughter of Carlos Menem	Victoria de la Rúa
Soledad Sylveyra		Flavio "Hijitus" Gastaldi
Cecilia Bolocco		Roberto Peña
Patricia Bullrich	Minister of Social Security	Unknown
Juan Pablo Baylac		Gabriel Almirón
Darío Lopérfido	Secretary of Culture and Communication	Ramiro Agüero
Antonio Cafiero		Fernando Ramírez

=== Gran Cuñado 2002 ===
The third edition started in 2002.

The politicians parodied were:

Name	Position	Actor/Actress
Adolfo Rodríguez Saa	Governor of San Luis Province	Campi
Carlos Reutemann		Álvaro Navia (Waldo)
Rodolfo Daer		Unknown
Raúl Alfonsín	Ex-President of Argentina (1983-1987, 1987-1989)	Unknown
Elisa "Lilita" Carrió	President and Founder of Civic Coalition ARI	Larry de Clay
Luis Barrionuevo		Unknown
Graciela Camaño	Minister of Labour	Flavio Gastaldi (Hijitus)
José Manuel de la Sota		Yayo Guridi
Eduardo Duhalde		Sebastián Almada
Luis Zamora	Deputy of Buenos Aires Province	Unknown
Roberto Lavagna		Freddy Villarreal

=== Gran Cuñado 2009 ===
The fifth edition of Gran Cuñado had 19 participants, and began broadcasting on 11 May 2009 with a 31.9 rating and a peak of 46 points. The triumph belonged to the imitation of Francisco de Narváez, by Roberto Peña.

This edition was broadcast for much of the electoral campaign for the legislative elections in Argentina in 2009, and given its huge success, several media suggested that it influenced to some degree its development. Several of the parodied figures made statements on the program, and some even visited it in person.

The politicians parodied were:

Name	Position	Actor
Julio Cobos	Vice-President of Argentina	José María Listorti
Francisco de Narváez	Deputy of Buenos Aires Province	Roberto Peña
Néstor Kirchner	Ex-President of Argentina	Freddy Villarreal
Mauricio Macri	Chief of Government of the City of Buenos Aires	Martín Bossi
Cristina Kirchner	President of Argentina	Martín Bossi
Elisa "Lilita" Carrió	Deputy for the City of Buenos Aires	Mauricio Jortack
Luis D'Elía	Member of the Argentine Workers' Central Union	Claudio Rico
Sergio Massa	Intendent of the Tigre Partido	Mariano Iúdica
Daniel Scioli	Governor of Buenos Aires Province	Jorge Fossetti
Felipe Solá	Deputy of Buenos Aires Province	Sebastián Almada
Aníbal Fernández	Chief of the Cabinet of Ministers	Jorge Crivelli (Carna)
Alicia Kirchner	Minister of Social Development	Gladys Florimonte
Alfredo de Angeli		Campi
Luis Juez	National Senator for Córdoba Province	Fernando Ramírez
Guillermo Moreno	Secretary of Internal Trade	Naím Sibara
Nacha Guevara	Deputy candidate for Front for Victory	Fátima Flórez
Hugo Moyano	Secretary General of CGT	Toti Ciliberto
Carlos Reutemann	Senator of Santa Fe Province	Álvaro Navia (Waldo)

=== Gran Cuñado 2016 ===
The latest edition of Gran Cuñado, which started airing on May 31, 2016. However, it was canceled.

The politicians parodied were:

Name	Position	Actor/Actress
Mauricio Macri	President of Argentina	Freddy Villarreal
Sergio Massa	Deputy of Buenos Aires Province	El Bicho Gómez
Horacio Rodríguez Larreta	Chief of Government of the City of Buenos Aires	Martín Bylik
Diego Santilli	Vice-Chief of Government of the City of Buenos Aires	Martín Sipicki
Máximo Kirchner	Deputy of Santa Cruz Province, son of Cristina Kirchner	Cristian Alonso
Alicia Kirchner	Governess of Santa Cruz Province, sister of Néstor Kirchner	Gladys Florimonte
Cristina Kirchner	Ex-President of Argentina	Fátima Flórez
Luis D'Elía	Militant, member of Front for Victory	Claudio Rico
Amado Boudou	Ex-Vice-President of Argentina	Mauricio Jortack
Fernando Esteche	Leader of the movement Quebracho	Unknown
Guillermo Moreno	Ex-Secretary of Internal Trade	Freddy Villarreal
Gabriela Michetti	Vice-President of Argentina	Fátima Florez
Marcos Peña	Chief of the Cabinet of Ministers of Argentina	Sebastián Almada
Hugo Moyano	General Secretary of CGT	Toti Ciliberto
Pablo Moyano	General Secretary of the Sindicato de Camioneros de la República Argentina (Argentina Truck Drivers' Syndicate)	Sebastián Almada
Margarita Stolbitzer	Deputy of the Nation for the Buenos Aires Province	Mauricio Jortack
Esteban Pérez Corradi	Accused of the General Rodríguez triple crime	Freddy Villarreal
José Ottavis	Deputy of the Buenos Aires Province	El Bicho Gómez
Victoria Xipolitakis	José's wife, celebrity	Fátima Flórez
Juan Manuel Urtubey	Governor of the Salta Province	José María Listorti
Isabel Macedo	Juan Manuel's wife, actress	Romina Giardina
Elisa "Lilita" Carrió	Deputy of the City of Buenos Aires	Fátima Flórez
María Eugenia Vidal	Governor of Buenos Aires Province	Fátima Flórez
José López	Ex-Secretary of Public Works of Argentina	Sebastián Almada

== Political opinions ==
"Gran Cuñado" generated a stir in the real political world, and several leaders expressed positive or negative opinions about the program. Minister Anibal Fernandez criticized the parody of President Cristina Fernandez, arguing that "In some ways I think there were excesses, should be regulated because it is the President, and other things, was very successful: we must be fair to those things". Shortly after he recanted on the use of the word "regulate", but insisted that the presidential parody should be removed from the program. The Vice President, Julio Cobos, was also uncomfortable with his respective parody, considering that it portrays him as indecisive or hesitant. Néstor Kirchner had no opinion on the program, arguing that he never saw it. For his part, opposition leaders De Narvaez, Elisa Carrio and Macri took the program with humor.

Other criticisms leveled against the program did not target the program itself but its impact on society, criticizing that in an election campaign imitations in Gran Cuñado were an issue of debate more discussed than the political projects of candidates.

=== Invited politicians ===
Real Francisco de Narváez dancing with his imitator.

In the early days of the start of the show, Francisco de Narváez met his imitator on the show "Intrusos". The success of the encounter led to a new segment being added to the Gran Cuñado: Derecho a réplica ("Right of Reply"), in which politicians wishing to do so could be invited to attend and interact with their imitators or imitations of the other politicians.

The first politician to appear on the agenda was, again, de Narvaez, on June 4. He was followed four days later by the rural leader Alfredo de Angeli, along with his brother. On 11 and 15 June were presented Kirchner politicians Sergio Massa and Daniel Scioli. On 16, 18 and 22 was the turn of politicians Felipe Solá, Gabriela Michetti and Mauricio Macri, who played a Queen song. The last one was Carlos Alberto Reutemann on 23 June. Until the electoral ban began at midnight June 25, it was speculated that Néstor Kirchner would perform in the program, but there was only a phone call.

There were no appearances of politicians after the election, but telephone contact. De Narváez, Macri and Solá were contacted on 29 June after his victory, and the last day of the show.
