= Sebastián Almada =

Uruguayan actor and comedian (born 1973)

- Born: June 9, 1973 (age 52); Montevideo, Uruguay
- Occupations: Comedian; actor; television host
- Children: 2
- Father: Enrique Almada

Sebastián Almada (born June 9, 1973) is a Uruguayan actor and comedian. The son of fellow comedian Enrique Almada, he is known for his work on the comedy television programs Videomatch and Showmatch, in which he has appeared since the 1990s.

Born into an artistically inclined family, Almada began his career as a comedian on Uruguayan television. In 1997, he relocated to Argentina, where he joined Videomatch, hosted by Marcelo Tinelli, becoming part of the show's regular cast until 2004. He later continued working on Tinelli-led projects, including Showmatch—the successor to Videomatch—throughout the 2000s and 2010s. Alongside his television work, Almada appeared in various television series and pursued a career in theatre. After settling back in Uruguay in 2021, he resumed his television career, primarily as a presenter.

== Filmography ==
=== Television ===
Year	Title	Role	Notes
1994–1996	De igual a igual	Himself/Various roles	Regular cast
1997–2004	Videomatch	Himself/Various roles	Regular cast
2004	Los Roldán		1 episode
2006–2009, 2014–2016, 2019	Showmatch	Himself/Various roles	Regular cast
2007	La oveja negra	Fiorito	Guest role
2009	Hogar, dulce hogar	Federico	Main cast
2011	Todas a mí	Alexini	Supporting role
2013–2014	Mis amigos de siempre	Ricardo "Queco" Garín	Supporting role
2016	Educando a Nina	Lawyer	1 episode
2017–2018	¿En qué mano está?	Himself/Various roles	Regular cast
2018	El host	Horacio	Recurring role
2018	La peña de Morfi	Himself	Regular cast
2021	La peluquería de don Mateo	Himself/The Client	Main cast
2021	Uruguay MasterChef Celebrity	Contestant	4th place
2021–2022	Máximo 90	Himself	Co-host
2025	Menem	Eduardo Duhalde	Guest role
