= Raul A. Orgaz =

Argentine lawyer, professor and writer

Raúl Andrés Orgaz (Santiago del Estero, 1888 – Córdoba, 1948) was an Argentine lawyer, professor and writer.

Orgaz pursued secondary studies at the Colegio Nacional de Monserrat, and graduated in law from the University of Córdoba in 1913. Subsequently, he traveled to France to study comparative civil law. After his stay in France, he returned to Córdoba where he taught sociology as Martinez Paz chair in the Faculty of Law until 1946. Because of his ideas removed from the position in 1946 during the confrontation between university students and the government.

He was deputy dean of Cordoba University, a member of the Education Council and a member of the High Court of Justice of Cordoba Province.

== Sociology ==
Raúl Orgaz wrote several books between 1927 and 1940, with the aim of explain the development and evolution of the social ideas in Argentina. He write the book “Las ideas sociales en la República Argentina” (Social ideas in the Argentine Republic) (1928) and several other in the “social Argentine romanticism”, including Echeverría y el saintsimonismo (1934), Alberdi y el historicismo (1937), Vicente Fidel López y la filosofía de la historia (1938) y Sarmiento y el naturalismo histórico (1940).

He wrote several books on history. Among them the following:

- Función constitucional de los ministros,
- La orientación americanista en la enseñanza de la historia (1911)
- La sinergia social Argentina;
- Echeverría y el saintsimonismo;
- Vicente Fidel López y la filosofía de la historia;
- Orgaz, Raúl, "Sociología argentina" (1950);
- Orgaz, Raúl, "Sociología" (1950).
- Orgaz, Raúl, “Concepto y Definición de sociología”, (1922)
