= General Rodríguez Partido =

General Rodríguez Partido de General Rodríguez
- Department
- location of General Rodriguez Partido in Gran Buenos Aires
- Coordinates: 34°37′S 58°57′W
- Country: Argentina
- Established: 25 October 1878
- Named for: Martín Rodríguez
- Seat: General Rodríguez

Government
  - Intendant: Mauro García (UP)

Area
  - Total: 360 km^{2} (140 sq mi)

Population
  - Total: 87,491
  - Density: 240/km^{2} (630/sq mi)
- Demonym: rodriguense
- Postal Code: B1748
- IFAM: BUE054
- Area Code: 0237
- Patron saint: Nuestra Señora del Carmen
- Website: generalrodriguez.gob.ar

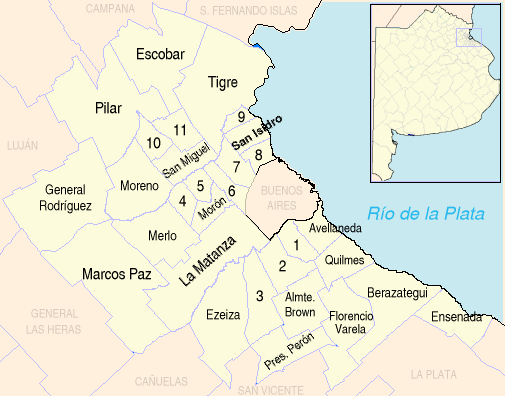
Location in the Buenos Aires urban area

General Rodríguez is a western partido of Buenos Aires Province, in Argentina. It is a district on the far western outskirts of Greater Buenos Aires.

== Name ==
The partido and its capital are named after Martín Rodríguez, a hero of the defense of Buenos Aires from the British invasion of 1806, a veteran of the Argentine War of Independence, and a former governor of Buenos Aires.

== Geographic Location ==
General Rodríguez is in the northeast portion of Buenos Aires Province, and it is 52 kilometres (32 mi) from Buenos Aires City. It is also bounded by Pilar, Moreno, Marcos Paz, Merlo and Luján cities. The physical geography of the place corresponds to the Urbanised Pampeana Prairie of Buenos Aires.

== Population ==
According to the preliminary estimates of the total population for General Rodríguez of the census of 2010, the population is 87,491 inhabitants.

• Population in 1991: 48,383 inhabitants (INDEC, 1991) • Population in 2001: 67,931 inhabitants (INDEC, 2001)

== Sports in the city ==
General Rodríguez is home to several polo clubs of Argentina.
