= Pachu Peña =

Argentine comedian and actor

Pachu Peña stage name of José María Peña (born August 23, 1962 in Rosario) is an Argentine comedian and actor who has worked for television and film.

== Career ==
In 2004 he appeared in No hay 2 sin 3 with Pablo Granados and Amelia Bence. He worked for a decade on the popular television show Videomatch, has hosted Peligro Sin Codificar since 2013, and in 2015 starred in the film Locos sueltos en el zoo. In 2015, he announced his candidacy for Santa Fe provincial deputy.

== Filmography ==
=== Films ===
- Bañeros III, todopoderosos (2006)
- Bañeros IV, Los rompeolas (2014)
- Locos sueltos en el ZOO (2015)

=== Television ===
- Propuesta Joven Channel 3 de Rosario (1984–1989)
- Videomatch Telefe (1993–2002) and (2004)
- La peluquería de Don Mateo Channel 9 (2003)
- No hay 2 sin 3 Channel 9 (2004–2005)
- Palermo Hollywood Hotel Channel 9 (2006)
- Gran Hermano Famosos Telefe (2007)
- De lo nuestro lo peor... y lo mejor América TV (2008)
- Showmatch Channel 13 (2009)
- Pablo y Pachu América TV (2010)
- HDP, Humor de primera Channel 13 (2010)
- Sin codificar América TV (2010–2013)
- Granados en Pijamas Channel 10 (2011)
- Duro de domar Channel 9 (2012)
- Showmatch El Trece (2012)
- Peligro sin codificar Telefe (2013–2015)
- Showmatch El Trece (2019)
- Showmatch: Bailando 2021 «Participant» (17th eliminated) El Trece (2021)
