= Gregorio Funes =

Argentine clergyman and author

Déan Dean Gregorio Funes
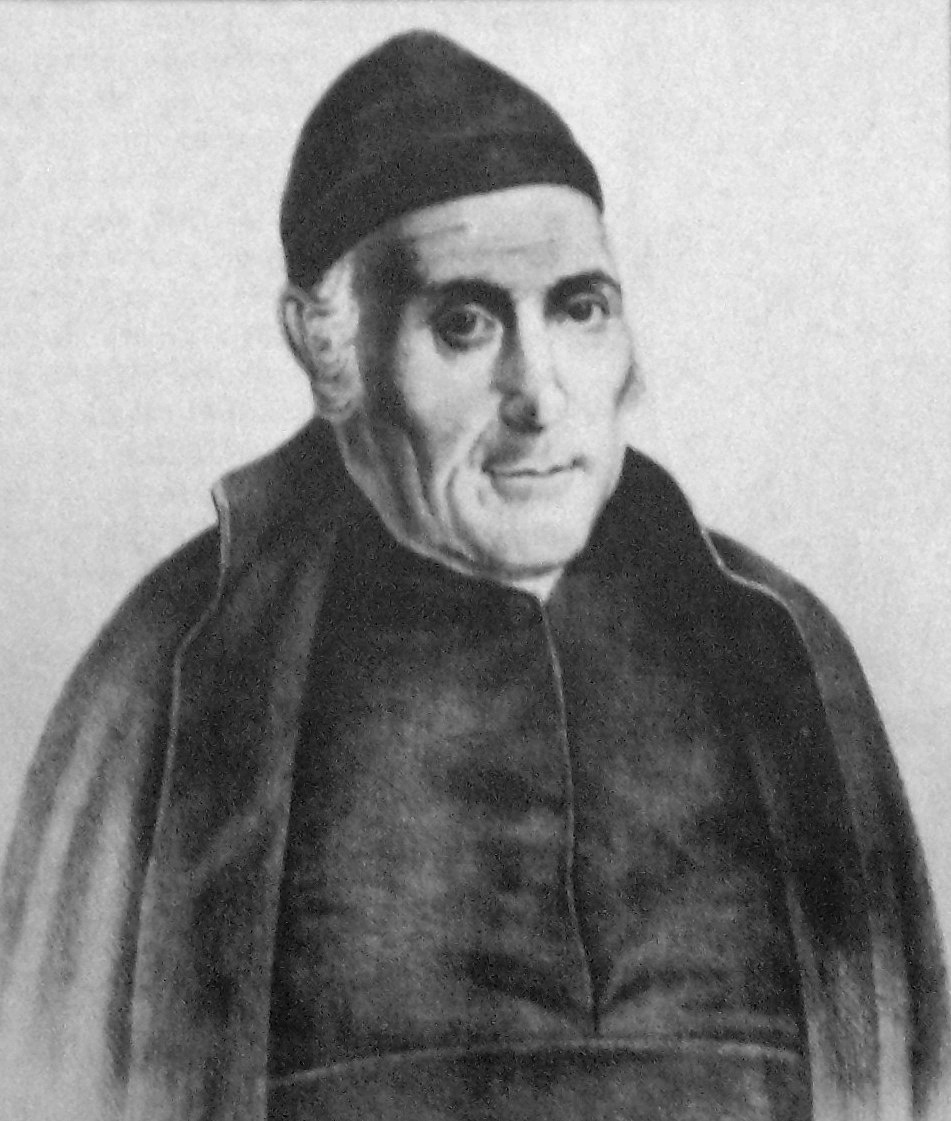

Deputy of the Junta Grande
- In office December 18, 1810 – December 22, 1811

Personal details
- Born: May 25, 1749 Córdoba, Viceroyalty of Peru
- Died: January 10, 1829 (aged 79) Buenos Aires, Argentina
- Party: Patriot
- Other political affiliations: Saavedrism
- Education: University of Alcalá
- Occupation: Dean

Gregorio Funes (May 25, 1749 – January 10, 1829), also known as Deán Funes, was an Argentine clergyman, educator, historian, journalist and lawmaker who played a significant role in his nation's early, post-independence history.

== Biography ==
=== Early life and the priesthood ===
Funes' parents were Juan José Funes y Ludueña, and María Josefa Bustos de Lara. The Funes family had arrived to Córdoba with the first group of settler led by Jerónimo Luis de Cabrera, and the Bustos family was part of a group of Spanish colonists that left Chile and moved to Mendoza and Córdoba.

Born in Córdoba, in what was then the Governorate of the Río de la Plata (a part of the Spanish Empire), Gregorio Funes was raised in privileged circumstances, and enrolled at the College of Monserrat. He studied in cloistered conditions, and shared his formative years with Juan José Castelli or Juan José Paso. Funes was ordained into the priesthood in 1773, and was named head seminarian; he graduated the following year, on August 10. A later dispute with the rector of the University of Córdoba led to Funes' transfer to a minor, Punilla Valley parish.

Funes ultimately transferred, without permission from the diocese, to the University of Alcalá de Henares (Spain), in 1779. He returned to South America in 1793, where he was named canon of the Cathedral of Salta, and in 1804 was promoted to dean of the cathedral. Funes was appointed rector of the University of Córdoba in 1807, and quickly implemented a package of reforms and modernization. Established the Departments of Mathematics, Experimental Physics, French Language studies, Music Theory, and Trigonometry, as well as donating a part of his family estate for curricular expansion. His administration replaced much of the university's Franciscan faculty for clergy from the local Diocese.

Despite his disapproval of the work of René Descartes, John Locke, and Gottfried Leibniz, for instance, Funes' reforms were sufficiently ambitious to run afoul of the Viceroy of the Río de la Plata, Rafael de Sobremonte. The invasion of Spain by the Emperor Napoleon in 1808, and the capture of King Ferdinand VII led Funes to join Manuel Belgrano and Juan José Castelli as an adherent to Carlotism, a movement in support of crowning Princess Carlota Joaquina of Spain as Queen, which sought to both advance a legitimate monarch, as well as to further the possibility of Independence.

=== The May Revolution ===
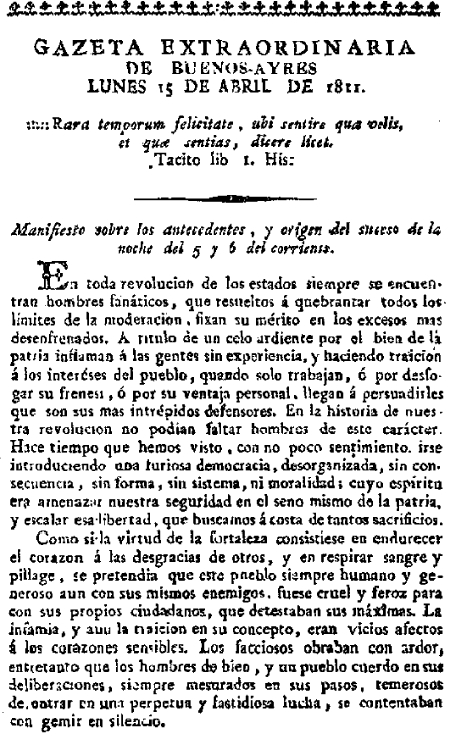
Communiqué authored by Dean Funes in defense of the Junta, printed in the Gazeta de Buenos Ayres

Funes was the first Córdoba official to support the May Revolution of 1810, and contributed significantly to its success by informing the Argentine government, the Primera Junta, of an alliance between Governor Juan Gutiérrez de la Concha and former Viceroy Santiago de Liniers, who was organizing a counter-revolution. This report prompted a campaign against the latter by the Army of the North, which captured Liniers and the governor, and which established patriot control over Córdoba. Funes himself urged the army to return the captured leaders alive, though these were ultimately executed en route to Buenos Aires.

He was elected as a representative to the Junta Grande upon its replacement of the Primer Junta regime on December 18, 1810. The inclusion of representatives from the hinterland to the government was not unanimously supported, however, and Funes attempted to placate tensions by proposing a system of provincial juntas. The decree, enacted on February 11, 1811, also provided for the establishment of local juntas, and became the first form of federal government in Argentina, as well as the guarantor of continued political unity during the Argentine War of Independence.

Funes supported Junta President Cornelio Saavedra, who shared by federalist outlook, and was appointed to the Junta following a failed, April 5 uprising by forces partial to Buenos Aires, and opposed to a Junta they viewed as unacceptably dominated by provincial figures. Funes directed the Gazeta de Buenos Ayres, the official Junta newsletter, and El Argos de Buenos Aires, the leading business publication, during his tenure, and enacted laws bolstering freedom of the press despite the ongoing conflict with opponents. He also pressed for direct Junta control the granting of charters, deeming this the most important of the body's jurisdictions.

Saavedra's absence led to a crisis on September 8, when the former was unseated. Funes was appointed to replace Saavedra as head of the Junta, which was stripped of executive authority and placed under the aegis of a Triumvirate. He attempted to compromise by enacting a Decree of Organic Regulation to more clearly define separation of powers and other considerations. This decree, the first legal code in the fledgling nation's history, was nullified by the Triumvirate's First Secretary, Bernardino Rivadavia, however, who refused to offer or accept concessions to the now powerless Junta.

The Triumvirate's own frictions with the Regiment of Patricians, which they believed too autonomous for a military force of such scale, provided Funes with an opportunity to unseat the new regime when, on December 6, the Patricians rebelled against the regime in what became known as the Mutiny of the Braids. A counterinsurgency attack by Colonel José Rondeau quelled the revolt by December 11, however, and Funes was formally charged with sedition. The Junta was formally replaced by the Triumvirate on December 22, and Funes' sentence was commuted the following January.

=== Elder statesman ===
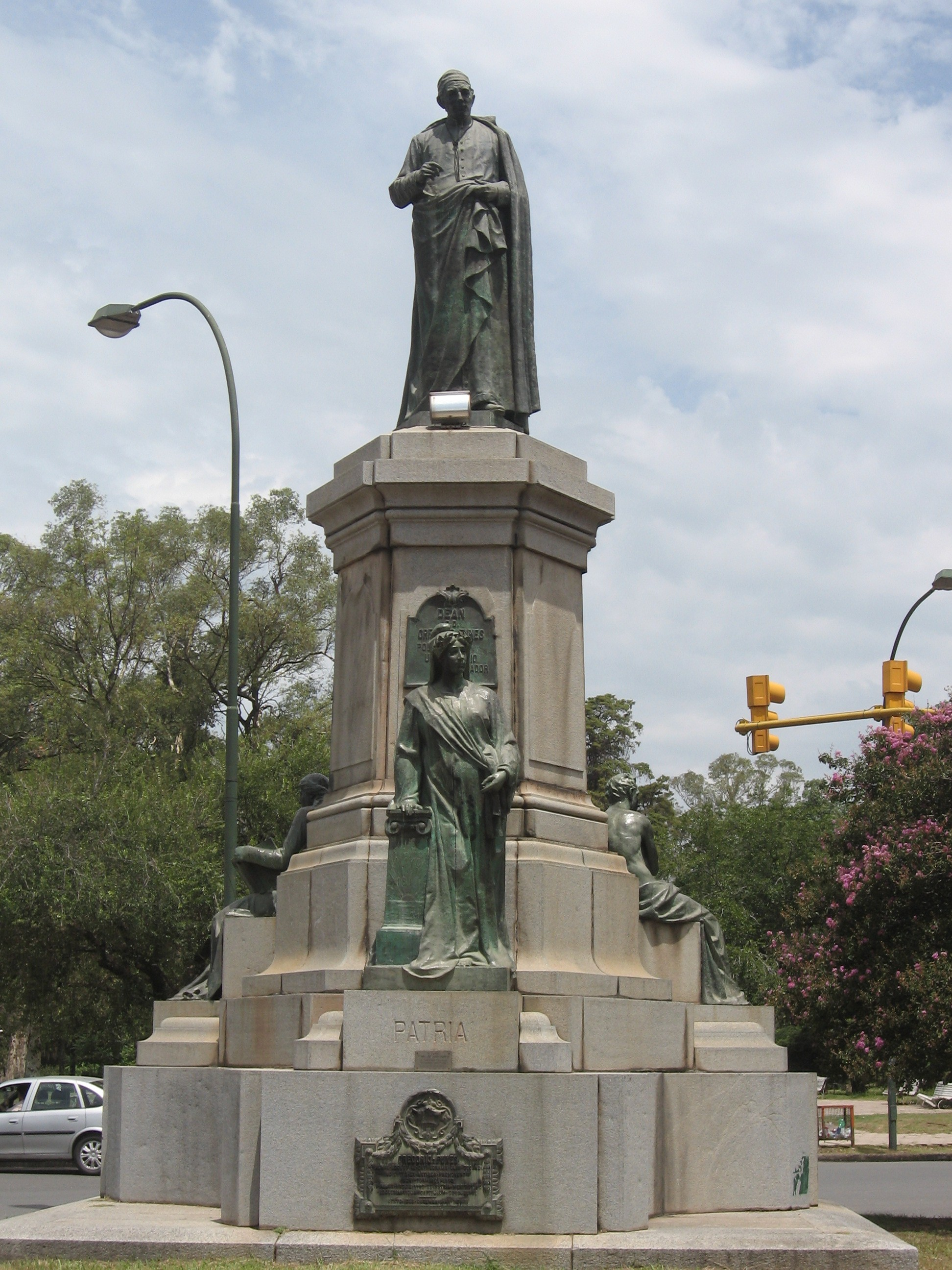
Monument to Dean Funes, in Córdoba city

Funes returned to Córdoba, where he authored one of the nation's first history texts, Ensayo de Historia Civil del Paraguay, Buenos Aires y Tucumán (Essay on the Civil History of Paraguay, Buenos Aires, and Tucumán). Writing became an occupation for the aging clergyman, and he refused the honor of representing his province at the 1816 Congress of Tucumán. The congress provoked a revolt late in the year by League of the Free Peoples supporter José Gervasio Artigas, and Funes accepted an appointment by Supreme Director Juan Martín de Pueyrredón as Governor of Córdoba. He later also accepted a post in replacement of one of two Córdoba representatives who resigned upon the relocation of the Congress of Tucumán to Buenos Aires in 1817.

Funes afterwards directed the congressional journal, El Redactor. He remained a monarchist, however, and advanced the notion of a constitutional monarchy during a constitutional assembly held in 1819. Unable to prevail in this proposal, Funes nonetheless supported the new constitution, with which he shared a reliance on centralized government. He wrote its preamble, as well as the proclamation presented in its support to provincial leaders.

The 1819 Constitution, mainly due to its Unitarian bias, was rejected by most provinces in the hinterland, and those in the east formed a Liga Federal in revolt. Unitarian forces were defeated at the Battle of Cepeda of 1820, and Funes served as the national government's envoy to negotiate the February 23 Treaty of Pilar, upon which the constitution was rescinded.

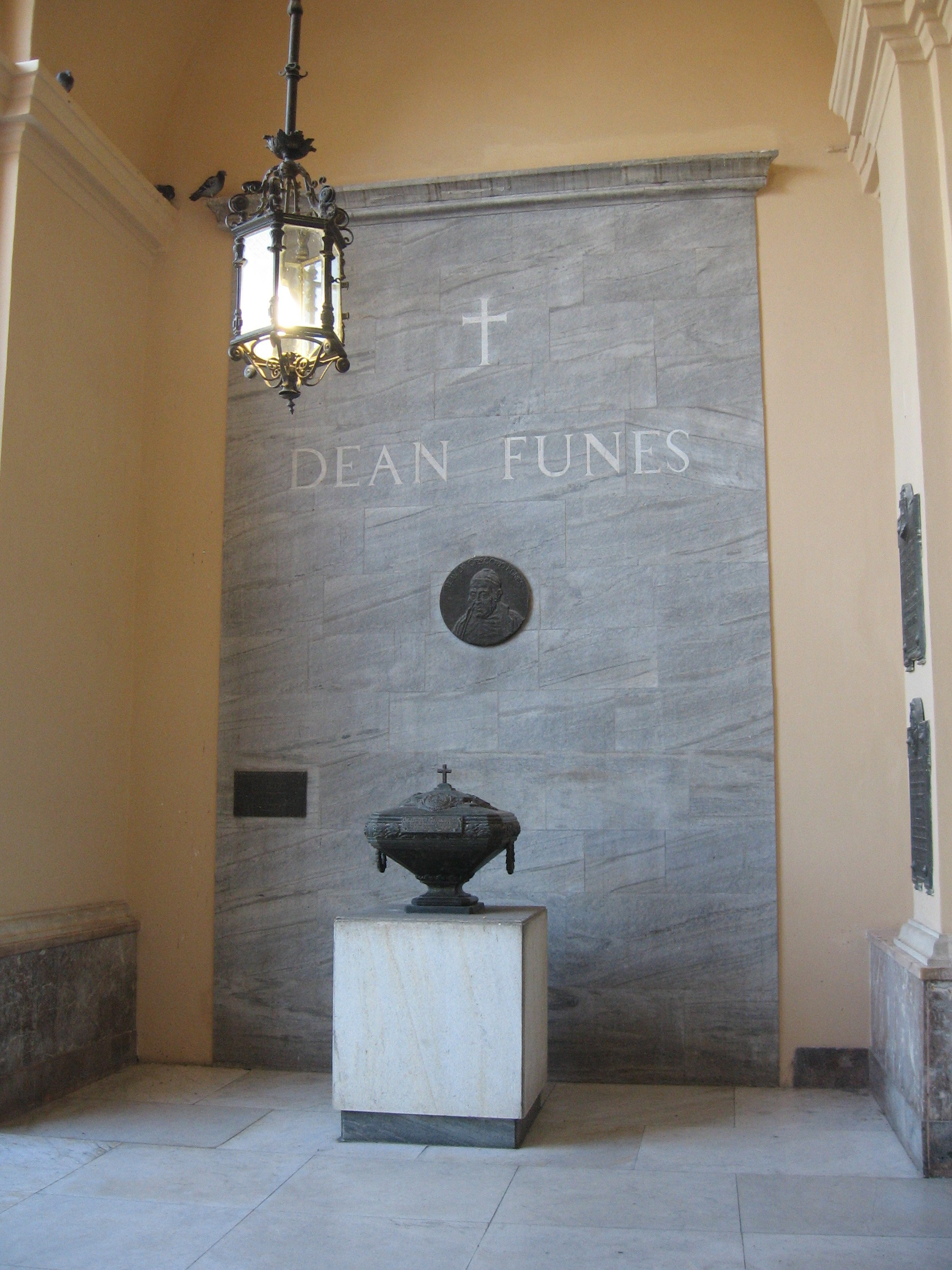
Urn bearing the remains of Dean Gregorio Funes, in the atrium of the Córdoba Cathedral

Funes remained in Buenos Aires, and was appointed Trade Representative to Gran Colombia by Governor Martín Rodríguez. He became acquainted with President Simón Bolívar during his stay in Bogotá, and attempted in vain to persuade Governor Rodríguez to take part in the Congress of Panama, which Bolívar had initially convened for December 1824, and which was, itself, postponed until 1826. Funes returned to assist in Governor Rodríguez's bid for national unity, the General Congress of 1824; the congress ultimately resulted in the Constitution of 1826, and the first (albeit temporary) centralized government in Argentina. He was elected a member of the American Antiquarian Society in 1825.

Funes retired in Buenos Aires. One of his friends, Santiago Spencer Wilde, invited the cleric for a tour of his recently inaugurated Parque Argentino, the first public garden in Buenos Aires; as they walked in the hot southern hemisphere summer, Dean Gregorio Funes collapsed, and died at age 79. Funes was interred at the La Recoleta Cemetery, though his remains were later transferred to the Córdoba Cathedral. A town in the vicinity of his parish during the 18th century was named in his honor (Deán Funes) upon its establishment in 1875.

== See also ==
- Manuel Alberti
- Francisco de Paula Castañeda

== Bibliography ==
- Bischoff, Efraín. Historia de Córdoba. Buenos Aires: Plus Ultra, 1989.
- Carbia, Rómulo. La Revolución de Mayo y la Iglesia. Buenos Aires: Nueva Hispanidad, 2005.
- Calvo, Nancy, Di Stéfano, Roberto, and Gallo, Klaus. Los curas de la Revolución. Buenos Aires: Emecé, 2002.
- De Titto, Ricardo (2010). Hombres de Mayo. Buenos Aires: Grupo Editorial Norma. pp. 51–71. ISBN 978-987-545-584-9.
