= Marcelo Süller =

Argentine footballer

Personal information
- Full name: Marcelo Hugo Süller
- Date of birth: 29 October 1971 (age 55)
- Place of birth: Buenos Aires, Argentina
- Height: 1.66 m (5 ft 5 in)
- Position: Forward

Senior career*
Years	Team	Apps	(Gls)
1988–1991	All Boys		
1991	Igloopol Dębica	5	(0)
1992–1993	All Boys	16	(0)
1993–1994	Club Almagro		
1995–1999	Deportivo Armenio		
1999–2000	Club Comunicaciones	6	(0)

Managerial career
- 2000: Barracas Central
- * Club domestic league appearances and goals

Marcelo Hugo Süller (born 29 October 1971) is an Argentine former professional footballer who played primarily as forward.

== Club career ==
Born in Buenos Aires, Süller began his career at All Boys. In the summer of 1991, he went on unsuccessful trial for Ekstraklasa side Wisła Kraków. Soon after that, he signed with Igloopol Dębica. Representing the club in the 1991–92 season, Süller made five league appearances without any goal scored in Polish top-flight. He returned to Argentina as he transferred to All Boys in 1992 and played 16 games for the club. Between 1993 and 2000, he competed in Primera B Metropolitana and Primera C playing for Club Almagro, Deportivo Armenio and Club Comunicaciones.

== Coaching career ==
In 2000, Süller coached Barracas Central.

== Personal life ==
He is adoptive brother of Silvia Süller.
