= Triple crime =

2008 crime in Argentina

- Native name: Triple crimen
- Date: August 13, 2008
- Location: General Rodríguez, Argentina
- Type: Murder
- Organised by: "La Morsa" (identity unknown)
- Deaths: Sebastián Forza; Damián Ferrón; Leopoldo Bina
- Suspects: José Luis Salerno; Hernán Ponce; Aníbal Fernández
- Convicted: Esteban Pérez Corradi; Cristian Lanatta; Martín Lanatta; Víctor Schilacci; Marcelo Schilacci

The Triple crime (Spanish: Triple crimen) took place in General Rodríguez, Argentina, on August 13, 2008. It involves the torture and deaths of three pharmaceutical businessmen, Sebastián Forza, Damián Ferrón, and Leopoldo Bina, who had been reported missing on August 7, 2008, and were found dead the following August 13.

== The event ==
Three pharmaceutical businessmen, Sebastián Forza, Damián Ferrón, and Leopoldo Bina, had been reported missing on August 7, 2008. They met at a supermarket in Sarandí, Buenos Aires and were found dead in General Rodríguez the following August 13. They had been shot and partially buried, and their corpses showed evidence of recent torture.

Forza's widow said the deaths were a mafia message for other people, and that her husband had paid $250,000 for protection to a man known as "La Morsa" (Spanish: The Walrus). This is the pseudonym of a man who could not be identified, who, she claimed, she had heard was a man with a moustache. She suspected he might be Esteban Pérez Corradi, a creditor of Forza's, because her late husband feared him.

The investigations in the following days revealed that the three men had ties with narcotics trafficking cartels. The drugstore of José Luis Salerno, a former associate of Ferrón's, was closed. Forza and Ferrón had a lab in Ingeniero Maschwitz that manufactured illegal drugs.

The import of ephedrine was restricted a month later, limiting it only to the labs that prepare legal drugs that contain it. It was also discovered that Forza financed the political campaign of Cristina Fernández de Kirchner during the 2007 general elections.

Cristian Lanatta, Martín Lanatta, Víctor Schilacci, and Marcelo Schilacci were detained and sentenced for the killings. Ibar Pérez Corradi remained at large for a longer time.

Journalist Jorge Lanata (unrelated to Cristian and Martín) interviewed Salerno and Martín Lanatta in 2015. They claimed that Aníbal Fernández (minister of Justice at the time) was "La Morsa", the mastermind of the crime. They claimed that Fernández ordered Forza, Ferrón, and Bina killed because they might have attempted to secure the illegal drug trade operation for themselves. The house of Jorge Lanata was attacked with stones two days later, and several .38 caliber bullet casings were found after the attack. In October 2020, claims about Aníbal Fernández implication were dismissed, revealing in court that "La Morza" was a media set up to involve Aníbal Fernández in the Triple crime.

== Escape ==
Cristian Lanatta, Martín Lanatta, and Víctor Schilacci escaped from prison on December 27, 2015. They used a guard as hostage and fled in a prison employee's car. Three helicopters and 600 cops were deployed to locate them. The governor María Eugenia Vidal fired the leaders of the jailing system of the Buenos Aires province, who were suspected of having abetted the escape. The fugitives were reportedly seen in the San Juan Province, which could not be confirmed. They were found at Ranchos, near Chascomús, and fired at the police. It was also denounced that they had visited relatives in Quilmes. There was a second shooting and escape from the police in San Carlos, Santa Fe province. The fugitives attacked a rancher and escaped in his truck, but the truck crashed in the road to the north. Martín Lanatta escaped on his own and was captured shortly afterwards. It was announced that the three fugitives had been captured, but that misinformation was later rectified. The other two fugitives were captured a few days later in a small Northern village.

== Capture of Corradi ==
Ibar Pérez Corradi was captured in the Triple Border on June 9, 2016, with a new Paraguayan ID and with his fingerprints removed. The judges Sebastián Casanello and María Servini de Cubría asked for his extradition: Casanello works on the triple crime case, and Servini de Cubría on a case of drugs trafficking. Corradi refused to be extradited, claiming he did not trust the Argentine judiciary, that his family was in Paraguay, and that his life would be at risk if he returned. As a result, the extradition request may take two months to be answered.
