= Videomatch =

- El Show de Videomatch
- Genre: Comedy
- Presented by: Marcelo Tinelli
- Opening theme: "Twist and Shout" by The Beatles
- Country of origin: Argentina
- Original language: Spanish

Production
- Producers: Telefe Contenidos (1990-1996); Ideas del Sur (1996-2004)
- Running time: approx. 120 minutes

Original release
- Network: Telefe
- Release: March 1, 1990 – December 27, 2004

Related
- Showmatch

Videomatch is a late-night 120-minute Argentine comedy show hosted by Marcelo Tinelli and broadcast on Telefe that first aired in March 1, 1990 in the midnight time slot.

The show changed its name to Showmatch in 2005 after moving to Canal 9.

== History ==
Videomatch began as a sports show, but from its second year, sports were replaced with bloopers, and then comedy sketches, increasing its success to a large extent. According to Tinelli:

"The humorous spin began when the ratings dropped as low as 0 points, and due to the lack of budget we, along with the team, decided to bring every sports video available, even if they were of very poor quality or pathetic. Then, when we showed the clips, we made fun of the images, saying 'what the hell is this?'. That's when the show took off."

In this way, Tinelli got a second show, Ritmo de la noche, comprising the same cast of Videomatch but airing on Sundays in prime time.

Videomatch continued on Telefe until 2004, with excellent ratings, becoming one of the most-watched shows during its run and becoming a "classic"; until a dispute between Marcelo Tinelli and Claudio Villaruel (Director of Programming for Telefe) led to Tinelli leaving the channel. The show then moved to Channel 9, changing its name to Showmatch, changing its name to Showmatch.

== Characters and skits ==
The program was broadcast by Telefe for more than 15 years, and was composed of a team that was changed over the years, starting with sports commentators Gonzalo Bonadeo, Osvaldo Príncipi, Felipe Mc Gough, Henry de Ridder, Daniel Jacubovich, Marcelo "Teto" Medina, Ricardo "Lanchita" Bissio, Alejandro Coccia and others. And then it switched to comedians such as Leo Rosenwasser, Hugo Varela, Pablo Granados, Pachu Peña, Freddy Villareal, José María Listorti, Campi, Naim Sibara (El Turco Naim), Miguel Ángel Rodríguez, Diego Korol, Marcelo De Bellis, Larry de Clay, Rodrigo Rodríguez, Roberto Peña, Sergio Gonal, Waldo (Álvaro Navia), Yayo (José Carlos Guridi), Toti Ciliberto, Sebastián Almada and Pichu (Fernando Straneo).

Among its best remembered sketches are:

| Segment | Years aired | Description |
|---|---|---|
| Deportes en el Recuerdo | | A sports show hosted by Molfino (Pachu Peña) and Vidaña (Pablo Granados) recounting (fictional) classical moments in soccer. |
| Los hermanos Loprete | 1995 | Two brothers played by Fena Della Maggiora and Carlos Sturze, who combine celebrities with Argentine popular icons (e.g. The Beatles and the actor Carlitos Balá). At the end of the sketch, Marcelo asks them if the combination will work, to which they exclaim "¿Cómo?" ("What?!") |
| Los Raporteros | 1997-2003, 2009 | A duo of rappers (Fena Della Maggiora and Carlos Sturze) which recount the headlines of that time in a hip hop format. Sometimes guests are invited to rap with them. |
| Tack See Boys | | A parody of the Backstreet Boys. |
| Los Gauchos | | A trio of gauchos played by Daniel "Pupo" Otoño, Yayo and Carlos "Bubu" Tanús. |
| Leonardo Rivas, Taxista | | Leonardo Rivas (played by Leo Rosenwasser) is a taxi driver. The title is a parody of the film Rolando Rivas, taxista. |
| Leonor | | Leonor (Leo Rosenwasser) is a lady who goes to a bakery. |
| Figuretti | 1997-2001, 2009 | A character played by Freddy Villareal, who chases after celebrities when they're at events. |
| Jose María: Celular | | A sketch starring José María Listorti, involving him talking to someone on his cellphone on the street. |
| Rolando Fernández/El Gran DT | | Rolando Fernández (played by Toti Ciliberto) is a man who claims to be a known friend of almost every public figure (celebrity, politician, etc.) |
| José María: Ruidoso | | Another sketch with José María Listorti, involving him making sound effects next to someone eating. |
| Don Leo | | Leo Rosenwasser, disguised as an elderly person, asks people for help on crossing the street. |
| Top Forry | | A parody of Top 40 chart shows. |
| Alejandro Saz | | A parody of Spanish singer Alejandro Sanz, played by Roberto Peña. |
| Noti Pip | | A news program where the presenters and reporters alike use swear words that are bleeped, hence the name. |
| Los Topus 4 | | A folkloric musical ensemble (parody of Opus Cuatro) whose songs contain explicit meanings. |
| Fútbol Deprimente | 1998 | A parody of the sports show Fútbol de primera. |
| El payaso Muralito | | A low-budget children's show hosted by Muralito the clown (played by the comedian Alacrán). |
| Los Reclutas | | A group of recruits sing about current affairs on their drill running. |
| Fernandito | | |
| El Cantante de Protesta | | Naim Sibara plays a street performer who interrupts celebrities being interviewed. |
| Los Jaimitos | 2001, 2019 | A trio of kids (Roberto Peña, Daniel Bifulco and Rodrigo Rodriguez). who are expected to be innocent, but aren't. The ssketch was later replaced with a similar one called "Los Turritos", after the show's name change to Showmatch and moving to Channel 9. |
| Huevo y Poroto | | |
| El Sanatero | 199?-2003 | Pablo Granados interviews people on the street, asking them incoherent questions. |
| Yayo y su Cuarteto Obrero | 2003, 2009 | Yayo is the leader of a cuarteto ensemble which plays songs with explicit language. |
| Luna y Matilde | | Luna Acuña (Mariana Briski) and Matilde Menéndez (Sandra Monteagudo) are two young girls who are fans of Marcelo. |
| Chuckytitas | | A parody of the soap opera Chiquititas. |
| Los Tangueros | | |

- Hidden cameras:

| Name | Years aired | Description |
|---|---|---|
| El peor día de tu vida | | A series of unfortunate events that end up making the victim mad |
| La peor clase de tu vida | | A teacher is invited to give a class to some supposed students who treat the teacher badly. The circus artist Nazareno Mottola stands out from the rest, who stumbles, falls and hits in physical activities, which exhaust the patience of the victim. |
| Vale Valeria | | A fictional musical variety show hosted by singer Valeria Lynch. |
| La ventana de América | | |
| Debate abierto con el Dr. Borocotó | | |
| La movida internacional | | |
| El peor viaje de tu vida | | |
| La gran venganza | | One person decides to take revenge on another by hiring Videomatch to make him a hidden camera, mostly doing pranks on another level like throwing paint buckets or making objects break by accident or destroying cars pretending it was an accident |
| Propuesta indecente | | |
| Infraganti | | |
| Atracción fatal | | |
| Viva la fiesta | | |
| La cámara cómplice | | |
| Tardes musicales | | |
| Xuxa de América | | |
| Buenos vecinos | | |
| El padre de la novia | | The supposed new boyfriend of the father's daughter spends a few hours at her house until the father gets mad. With the performance of Pablo Mikozzi as a supposed boyfriend or Jorge González in some chapters. |
| Si lo sabe cante | | |

== Segments ==
- "30 Segundos de Fama" (30 seconds of fame) was a segment of the program in 2003. The latter consisted in showing contestants not from the popular medium, who display their talents or special abilities for less or the same period to 30 seconds, although usually exceed this estimated time to expose their talents more clearly. The segment was later transferred to Showmatch when the program moved to Canal 9, and later to Canal 13. However, in 2006, it was replaced by Bailando por un Sueño due to low ratings.
- "Animalmatch"
- "Comic"
- "Mimic"

== Musical themes ==
Among the most remembered opening themes are songs like "Twist and Shout" (by The Beatles), 19-2000 (by Gorillaz), "Vicio" (by Los Ratones Paranoicos), Pink (by Aerosmith) and more.

== Comic book adaptation ==
Walter Carzon created a comic strip based on El Oso Arturo, a mascot character who frequently appeared in VideoMatch.

== International versions ==
Franchise with a currently airing season
Franchise awaiting confirmation
Franchise with an upcoming season
Franchise with an unknown status
Franchise that was cancelled during development
Franchise no longer in production
Franchise on hold

| Country/Region | Name | Network | Premiere | Host(s) |
|---|---|---|---|---|
| Argentina (Original) | VideoMatch | Telefe | 1990 | Marcelo Tinelli |
| Chile | El Show de VideoMatch | Canal 13 | 1998 | Unknown |
| Spain | ShowMatch | Antena 3 | 2000 | Unknown |

== Awards ==
Marcelo Tinelli received the Golden Martín Fierro Award in 1998, and his show won more than 20 statuettes since.
