= Ideas del Sur =

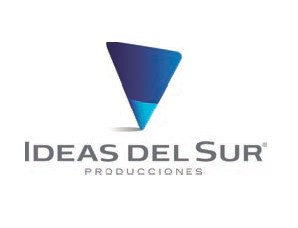
Ideas del Sur Logo

Ideas del Sur (Ideas from the South) was a production company founded by Marcelo Tinelli, host of the highest-rated show in Argentina: Videomatch and dissolved in December 2017.

From 1990 to 1997, the show was produced by the TV station, Telefe, but in 1998 Marcelo founded his own independent company so he could produce the show himself. He also started to produce different genres of production including fiction and game shows.

In 2005, Tinelli caused huge controversy when he decided to move his show, Videomatch (which was retitled Showmatch for legal reasons) and Los Roldan, the two highest-rated shows in the country at the time, from Telefe, the leading TV station, to the number three network Canal 9. While the move did not affect Showmatch, which continued to be the most watched show in the country, it affected Los Roldan which ended up losing over 50% of its audience..

On 29 December 2017 for legal reasons the company was dissolved. Nevertheless, their main shows, Showmatch and Los Especialistas del Show, and other less known shows, remain on air produced under Marcelo Tinelli's new production company, LaFlia Contenidos (TheFmly Contents)
