= Bailando Kids =

- poster of Bailando Kids
- Directed by: Alejandro Ripoll
- Presented by: Marcelo Tinelli (weeks 1–3); José María Listorti (weeks 4–8)
- Country of origin: Argentina

Production
- Running time: 150 mins. approx.

Original release
- Network: El Trece
- Release: May 7 – June 19, 2009

Bailando Kids is an Argentine dancing competition show on the show Bailando por un Sueño (which is, at the same time, the Argentine version of Dancing with the Stars) involving couples composed of children from 7 to 12 years old who are judged by a jury. It was broadcast by El Trece and the host was Marcelo Tinelli during the first three weeks and then José María Listorti during the next four. It premiered on May 7, 2009 and the season finale was on June 19, 2009. The show was strongly criticized by various sectors for manipulation of the child competitors.

The jury were the dancer Laura Fidalgo, theatral directors Reina Reech and Carmen Barbieri and comedian Miguel Angel Cherutti. The winner was Pedro Maurizi partnered with Candela Rodríguez.

The show wasn't renewed for a new season due to low ratings. El Trece continued producing the standard competition for adults instead in further years.

== Couples ==
Boy	Boy's Age	Girl	Girl's Age	Status
Ignacio Molina	11	Magallí Carrillo	9	Eliminated 1st
Facundo de los Ríos	11	Florencia Sarmiento	11	Eliminated 2nd
Aaron Lorenzo	9	Julieta Demir	11	Eliminated 3rd
Franco García	9	Agostina Payrola	9	Eliminated 4th
Cristian Hinni	10	Valentina Rodríguez	9	Eliminated 6th
Iván Padin	10	Julieta Sacher	9	Eliminated 7th
Matías Pérez	10	Zaira Fuentecilla	9	Eliminated 8th
Ramiro Bassi	10	Florencia Coseli	10	Semifinalist
Joaquín Alfonso	9	Clarisa Souto	11	Semifinalist
Augusto Fernandez	11	Valentina Balbi	11	Semifinalist
Rodrigo Folino	11	Bianca Santia	9	Semifinalist
Facundo Oviedo	10	Florencia Custirriano	7	Semifinalist
Agustín Pierobon	12	Paula Busch	12	Semifinalist
Facundo Perez	10	Juliana Mansilla	10	Runners-Up
Pedro Maurizi	9	Candela Rodríguez	9	Winners

== Scoring chart ==
Couple	Place	1	2	3	4	5	6	F
Pedro & Candela	1	38	40	40	40	36	40	40
Facundo P. & Juliana	2	37	39	37	40	40	36	39
Agustín & Paula	3	37	37	39	38	40	40	37
Facundo O. & Florencia C.	4	33	38	37	40	40	35	36
Rodrigo & Bianca	5	36	38	34	36	40	34	34
Augusto & Valentina	6	37	38	36	34	39	40	34
Joaquín & Clarisa	7	32	37	34	40	35	39	33
Ramiro & Florencia C.	8	38	40	32	40	36	40	33
Matías & Zaira	9 & 12	34	33	36	36			32
Cristian & Valentina	10	32	38	33	38	34		
Iván & Julieta S.	11	32	36	40	37	35		
Franco & Agostina	13	33	40	38	36			
Aaron & Julieta D.	14	37	36	33				
Facundo D. & Florencia S.	15	33	35					
Ignacio & Magallí	16	32						

Red numbers indicate the lowest score for each week.
Green numbers indicate the highest score for each week.
indicates the couple eliminated that week.
indicates the returning couple was saved by the judges.
indicates the returning couple was the last to be called safe and finished in the bottom two.
indicates the couple that withdrew.
indicates the winning couple.
indicates the runner-up couple.
indicates the semifinalists couples.

=== Highest and lowest scoring performances ===
The best and worst performances in each dance according to the judges' marks are as follows:

Style	Best dancer(s)	Best score	Worst dancer(s)	Worst score
Reggaeton	Ramiro & Florencia C. Pedro & Candela	38	Iván & Julieta S. Cristian & Valentina; Joaquín & Clarisa; Ignacio & Magallí	32
Axé	Franco & Agostina; Ramiro & Florencia C. Pedro & Candela	40	Matías & Zaira	33
Rock and roll	Pedro & Candela; Iván & Julieta S.	40	Ramiro & Florencia C.	32
Cumbia	Ramiro & Florencia C. Joaquín & Clarisa; Facundo O. & Florencia C. Facundo P. & Juliana; Pedro & Candela	40	Augusto & Valentina	34
Disco	Rodrigo & Bianca; Facundo O. & Florencia C. Agustín & Paula; Facundo P. & Juliana	40	Cristian & Valentina	34
Cuarteto	Pedro & Candela	40	Matías & Zaira	32

== Ratings ==
Day	Time	Date	Rating	Share	Viewers
Thursday	10:30 pm	May 7, 2009	29.6	56.6%	2.865.000
Friday	10:30 pm	May 8, 2009	27.1	52.8%	2.623.000
Thursday	10:30 pm	May 14, 2009	22.0	49.6%	2.129.000
Friday	10:30 pm	May 15, 2009	19.8	43.7%	1.916.000
Friday	9:30 pm	May 22, 2009	18.1	48.4%	1.752.000
Friday	9:30 pm	May 29. 2009	14.9	50.1%	1.442.000
Friday	9:30 pm	June 5, 2009	13.1	40.0%	1.268.000
Friday	9:30 pm	June 12, 2009	10.1	36.0%	977.000
Friday	9:30 pm	June 19, 2009	12.1	39.2%	1.171.000

- The average audience of the contest was 18.4 rating points, 46.1% share of the screen (share) and 1,781,000 viewers.
