= Francisco de Narváez =

Colombian-born naturalized Argentine businessman and politician

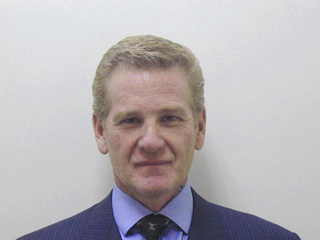

National Deputy
- In office 10 December 2005 – 3 December 2015
- Constituency: Buenos Aires

Personal details
- Born: Francisco de Narváez Steuer; 22 September 1953 (age 72) Bogotá, Colombia
- Party: Justicialist Party (1983–2008); Light Blue and White Union (2008–present)
- Other political affiliations: PRO Union (2007–2011); Federal Consensus (2019–present)
- Spouse: Agustina Ayllón
- Occupation: Businessman and politician
- Website: Official website

Francisco de Narváez Steuer (born 22 September 1953 in Bogotá), known as El Colorado or Pancho, is a Colombian-born naturalized Argentine businessman, politician who ran for governor of Buenos Aires Province on the Unión PRO ballot in the 2007 elections in Argentina. He was a member of the Argentine Chamber of Deputies until late 2015.

== Business life ==
De Narváez arrived in Argentina at the age of three. His father was a Colombian coffee merchant. His mother's family owned the Almacenes Tía chain of supermarkets, started by his grandfather, Karel Steuer, in Eastern Europe as 'Te-Ta'. Upon relocating to South America, it became a major chain. De Narváez began work there at the age of 17 years and was appointed Chief Executive in 1989, a position which he held for ten years. De Narváez eventually sold the Argentinean division of the company in 2002 for $638 million.

In 2002, his group bought 50% of La Rural, a major and historic exhibitions centre, and the additional 50% in 2005. In 2007 he bought one of Argentina's most important TV stations, América TV. He owns 20% of the El Cronista Comercial. In 1983, de Narváez took Argentine citizenship to vote for Raúl Alfonsín. His nickname in business and politics is "El Colorado", and his personal fortune has been estimated to be in excess of $500 million.

== Political life ==
Following the 2001 crisis, he decided to enter politics and joined the Justicialist Party. He aided the presidential campaign of Carlos Menem in 2003 as a candidate for the position of Minister of Social Development. De Narváez ran from the political left, commenting that in office he would be a staunch welfarist.

In July 2004 he then self-financed major commemorations around Argentina to celebrate the 30th anniversary of Peron's death.

As a centre-right pro business politician, he supported the senatorial bid of Hilda de Duhalde and sits with dissident Peronists in Congress, opposed to the government of the Kirchners. Then, he was elected as National Deputy for Buenos Aires Province in 2005, the first foreigner to be elected to the Chamber.

He stood to be Governor of the Province in 2007, gaining over a million votes. Jorge Macri, cousin of Mauricio Macri, was his running mate and their campaign was supported by Macri's party Commitment to Change and the PRO coalition. De Narváez mentioned to the press in November 2012 that he would be interested in forming a similar coalition in the upcoming 2013 election season as well.

In 2008 de Narváez took the side of agriculture workers against the Argentinian government over efforts to either ban certain meat exports. He has also spoken out about the nationalization of private industry in many other areas of governance.

During his campaigns, de Narváez is known for self-financing his campaigns, using his own money to pursue his political interests.

Francisco de Narvaez appearance at Gran Cuñado.

On June 28, 2009, de Narváez defeated former president Nestor Kirchner in the legislative midterm elections in the province of Buenos Aires. During the electoral campaign he took part of the humoristic TV show Gran Cuñado, which included parodies of the most important politicians of Argentina (including De Narváez himself), and engaged with his parody in stage jokes. This act generated controversy in the media about the effects on his actual electoral performance: columnists like Joaquín Morales Solá claim he was benefited from it, while other think that such influence was relative. Francisco de Narváez says that Gran Cuñado helped him, and that it helped to humanize the image of politicians. He also ran the campaign in Buenos Aires as part of a political alliance between himself, Chief of Government of the City of Buenos Aires Mauricio Macri and former Governor of Buenos Aires Felipe Solá.

In 2010 de Narváez introduced a bill to the Argentinian legislature to increase the universal child allowance from 180 pesos to 250. The bill was targeted at alleviating child poverty, and to correlate the allowance with wage inflation. In 2011 de Narváez ran for office with the UDESO as a gubernatorial candidate in the Buenos Aires province.

In October 2012 de Narváez began national calls for the formation of a new coalition to remove the majority coalition from power in Argentina, naming Peronist dissidents, the PRO, and others as potential members of a new ruling coalition. He has been particularly critical of the national government in its handling of civil security and the country's problem with crime.

== Personal life ==
His second wife is former model Agustina Ayllón, friend of Juliana Awada, with whom he has three children.
