= Locos sueltos en el zoo =

- Directed by: Luis Barros
- Written by: Alberto Monasterio; Luis Alberto Delvecchio
- Produced by: Hugo E. Lauría; Gladys Esquivel; Luis A. Scalella; Carlos L. Mentasti
- Starring: Emilio Disi; Fabián Gianola; Gladys Florimonte; Alejandro "Marley" Wiebe; Pachu Peña; Karina Jelinek; Luciana Salazar; Nazareno Móttola; Álvaro "Waldo" Navia; Matías Alé; Alberto Fernández de Rosa; Noelia Marzol; Alejandro Müller
- Cinematography: Graciela Fraguglia
- Edited by: Luis Barros
- Music by: Diego Monk
- Production companies: Argentina Sono Film; Walt Disney Studios Motion Pictures
- Distributed by: Cine Argentino; INCAA; Argentina Sono Film; Walt Disney Studios Motion Pictures; Telefe
- Release date: July 9, 2015
- Running time: 86 minutes
- Country: Argentina
- Language: Spanish

Locos Sueltos en el zoo (English: Crazies Let Loose in the Zoo) is an Argentine comedy film directed by Luis Barros. This stars Emilio Disi, Fabián Gianola, Gladys Florimonte, Alejandro "Marley" Wiebe, Pachu Peña, Karina Jelinek, Luciana Salazar, Nazareno Móttola, Álvaro "Waldo" Navia, Matías Alé, Alberto Fernández de Rosa, Noelia Marzol and Alejandro Müller. It was released on July 9, 2015 in Argentina.

== Plot ==
It's an adventure that focuses on animals at the Buenos Aires Zoo. What visitors don't know about the animals is that like, humans, they can talk. This piques the interest of some gangsters who don't have the best intentions.

== Cast ==
- Emilio Disi as Alfredo
- Fabián Gianola as Julián
- Gladys Florimonte as Elsa
- Alejandro "Marley" Wiebe as Oruga
- Pachu Peña as Paco Bielsa
- Karina Jelinek as Barbara "Barbie"
- Luciana Salazar as Paz
- Nazareno Móttola as Benjamín "Benja"
- Álvaro "Waldo" Navia as Walter Bielsa
- Matías Alé as Alejandro Brooklyn
- Alberto Fernandez de Rosa as Gregorio
- Noelia Marzol as Noelia
- Alejandro Müller as Norman
- Mariana Antoniale as Delfina
- Ivana Nadal as Ivana
- Rafael Walger as Pipo
- Daniel Ambrosino as A zookeeper

== See also ==
- Cinema of Argentina
