= Francisco de Paula Castañeda =

Argentinian journalist

father Father Francisco de Paula Castañeda
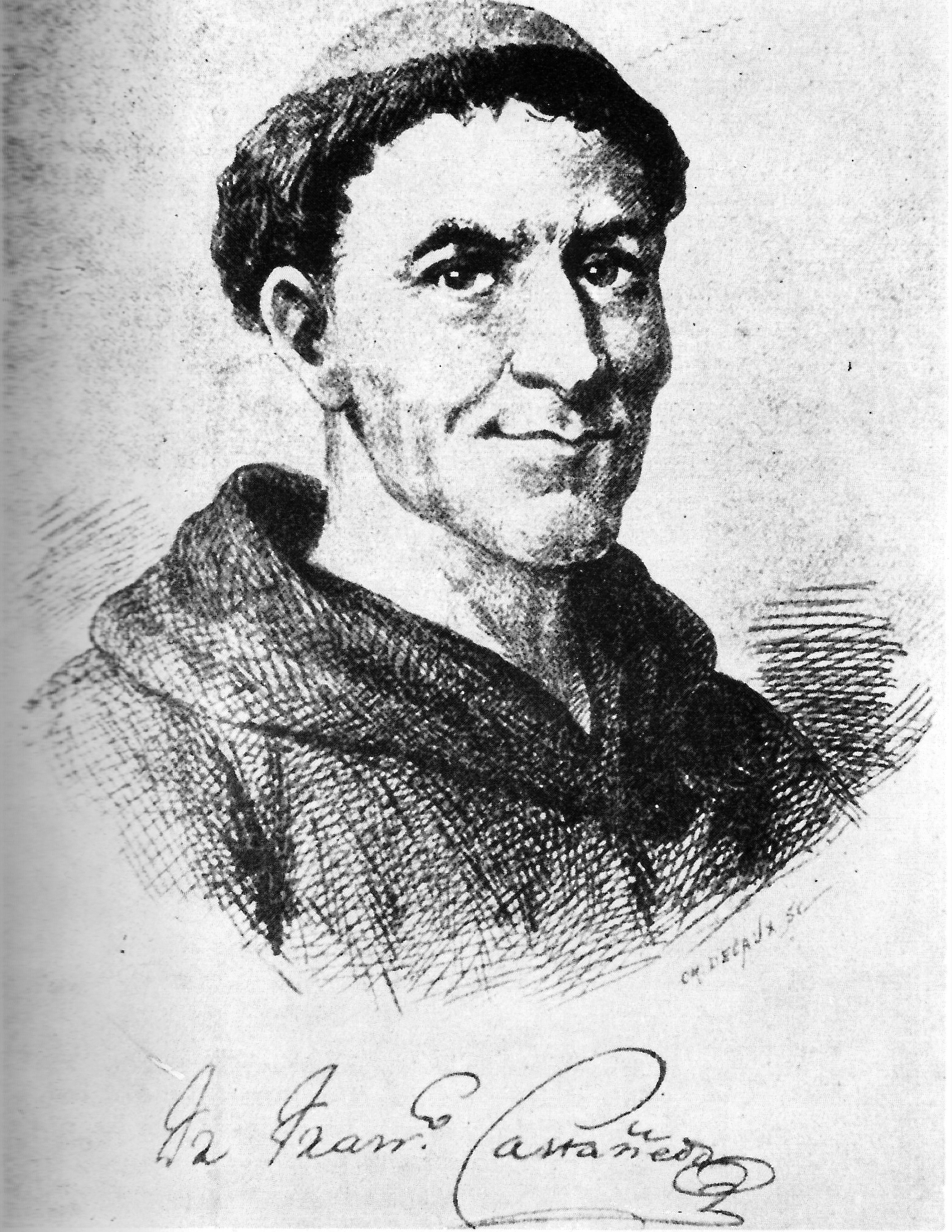
- Francisco de Paula Castañeda (ca. 1820)

Personal details
- Born: 3 January 1776 Buenos Aires, Viceroyalty of Peru
- Died: March 11, 1832 (aged 56) Paraná, Provincias Unidas del Río de la Plata
- Party: Patriot, conservative
- Education: University of Córdoba
- Occupation: Catholic priest, teacher, journalist
- Nickname: El Gauchipolítico

Francisco de Paula Castañeda, (Buenos Aires 1776 - Paraná 1832) also known as Padre Castañeda ("Father Castañeda") and whose pen name was El Gauchipolítico, was an Argentine political activist, journalist, writer, teacher and Roman Catholic priest who played an important role in the political life of his country during the first years of the new-born Provincias Unidas del Rio de la Plata. A Franciscan friar of the Order of Friars Minor, Castañeda was a fierce opponent to laicist policies promoted by Minister of State Bernardino Rivadavia.

== Early life ==
Born in Buenos Aires from the Spanish businessman Ventura Castañeda and his wife María Andrea Romero Pineda, Francisco Castañeda completed his first studies at Real Colegio de San Carlos, where he graduated in 1790. A member of the Franciscan Order since 1793, Castañeda was ordained priest in Córdoba in 1800. He was shortly after appointed chair of philosophy for the University of Córdoba and later chair of moral theology at the Recoleta monastery in Buenos Aires.

== British invasions and May Revolution ==
During the British invasions of the Rio de la Plata, Castañeda served as chaplain of both Spanish and Catholic Irish troops. A supporter of the Reconquista, he is reputed with helping Irish soldiers to desert and join the Spanish forces.

A strong advocate of the May Revolution, Castañeda made good use of his rhetorical talent in defense of the patriots position in front of his parishioners. His scathing preaching gained him the nickname of "the collector of enemies". Castañeda was the only member of Buenos Aires clergy to preach a sermon on 25 May 1815, the fifth anniversary of the revolution. Ferdinand VII had been restored as King of Spain and the Quadruple Alliance vowed to counter republican and liberal revolutions, and a royalist reaction was feared among the former Spanish colonies in America.

As a teacher, Castañeda established a craft and arts school at the Recoleta monastery in 1817. The school was eventually merged into the University of Buenos Aires in August 1821.

== Journalism and internal exile ==
Castañeda represents one of the few instances during Argentina's independence era where a member of the clergy was also a successful writer. A defender of the Hispanic culture values against enlightenment, Castañeda used to publish short-lived rags to publicly debate with his critics. Martín Rodríguez was appointed governor of Buenos Aires in 1820 and in 1821, through his Minister of State, Bernardino Rivadavia, he decreed a number of reforms, among them a law of emphyteusis of public lands and restrictions to the power of the church. Castañeda resorted once again to the tactics of publishing ephemeral papers in favour of the clergy to circumvent censorship. This position eventually granted him the exile. Castañeda settled in Santa Fe Province, then ruled by strongman Estanislao Lopez, where in 1823 he founded an arts and crafts school. Lacking of funds to sustain his project, Castañeda moved to Paraná, capital of the neighbour province of Entre Ríos in 1827, where he established an elementary school under the auspices of governor Pascual Echague. Castañeda passed away there on 11 March 1832. Castañeda's remains were buried in Buenos Aires on 28 July, and the funeral rites were celebrated on 22 December. The oration was given by Franciscan friar Nicolás Aldazor.

== See also ==
- Gregorio Funes
- Manuel Alberti
