= Ibar Pérez Corradi =

Argentine businessman and murderer (born 1977)

Ibar Esteban Pérez Corradi (born July 16, 1977) is an Argentine criminal who has been imprisoned for narcotics trafficking and money laundering and suspected of connections with a triple crime that took place in Argentina in 2008. At the time of his capture, on June 19, 2016 in Paraguay, he had been at large since March 20, 2012

== Career ==
After working for the National Bank from 1996 to 2002, during which time he also became involved in the narcotics trade, he became a successful financier in 2006.

He co-owns two firms, Odín Concept SRL, a pharmaceutical house, in which his partner is Pablo Héctor Quaranta, and C&C Building, a construction company, in which his partner is Martín Eduardo Lanatta.

In May 2008, Pérez Corradi became president of Elaboradora de Productos Biológicos S.A., while his “right-hand man,” Jorge Cabrera, became director of the firm.

== Drug trafficking ==
He is said to have trafficked in illegal narcotics, including ephedrine. One source describes him as a member of a “cartel” that dealt in “precursor chemicals”; another identifies him as a member of a “drug mafia.” It has been reported that he got rich selling ephedrine to Mexicans, and that his suppliers were named Alfredo Abrahams and Josué Fucks (sic).

In recent years, Perez Corradi's name has been raised in connection with many drug trafficking cases. A few months after the so-called General Rodriguez triple murder (see below) in August 2008, he was one of several high-profile figures investigated for ephedrine trafficking and illegal trade in medicines that were the basis for ephedrine and crystal meth.

In August 2009, La Nación reported that the Federal Court of San Isidro had ordered the extradition of Pérez Corradi to the United States. This order was a response to an order of capture issued by a court in the state of Maine, which accused Pérez Corradi of having sent a parcel into the U.S. containing 80 oxycodone tablets, and which had led to the detention of Pérez Corradi on October 22, 2008. A request for his release was rejected in September 2010.

In January 2011, Clarín reported that the Supreme Court of Argentina had approved the extradition of Pérez Corradi to the United States on charges of trafficking in oxycodone, thus upholding the decision of the San Isidro court.

== Money laundering ==
Pérez Corradi, according to one source, laundered money through the Guinea Bissau consulate in Buenos Aires.

In December 2010, Judge Norberto Oyarbide indicted Pérez Corradi in Argentina for money laundering, in a case involving the assets of pharmaceutical entrepreneur Néstor Lorenzo, arrested banking union leader Juan José Zanola, and the late Sebastian Forza. The charges also linked Pérez Corradi with ephedrine trafficking and with a case involving tampered medicine.

In 2011, Pérez Corradi was placed in pretrial detention in Argentina on charges of money laundering. On December 15, 2011, he was released from prison after paying a bail of 100,000 pesos. At the time of his release, he was still facing the possibility of being extradited to the United States on drug trafficking charges.

== Triple murder ==
On August 7, 2008, Sebastián Forza, Damian Ferron, and Leopoldo Bina were murdered in a house in the Quilmes neighborhood of Buenos Aires. Their bodies were stored in a freezer and eventually thrown in a ditch in another part of the city, where they were found on August 13. The men were killed, according to one source, “in perfect mafia style,” and all three of them had ties to the pharmaceutical business. Peréz Corradi was reportedly in Cancún at the time of the triple murder.

On March 20, 2012, the Argentine Ministry of Justice issued a warrant for Pérez Corradi in connection with the triple murder, of which he is believed to be the mastermind. During the succeeding months, several raids were conducted in various places but Pérez Corradi was not found. He remains a fugitive, and is named by Interpol as one of the world's most wanted fugitives.

On December 20, 2012, two pairs of brothers, Martin and Cristian Lanatta and Victor and Marcelo Schillaci, were convicted of participation in the crime and sentenced to life in prison. The motive, according to the court, was that Forza, Ferron, and Bina's efforts to become involved in drug trafficking had threatened the narcotics trade of Pérez Corradi and his business partner Martin Lanatta.

The triple murder is the subject of a book, La Ejecución: La historia secreta del triple crimen que desnudó la conexión con la mafia de los medicamentos y la recaudación de la campaña K (The Execution: The Secret History of the Triple Murder that Laid Bare the Connection with the Pharmaceutical Mafia and the K Campaign Fund). The book was written by Emilia Delfino and Rodrigo Alegre and published by Random House Mondadori in 2011.

Corradi was reported detained in Paraguay on February 12, 2016; but it was reported later that he was still at large.

He was captured in the Triple Border on June 9, 2016, with a new Paraguayan ID and with his fingerprints removed. The judges Sebastián Casanello and María Servini de Cubría asked for his extradition: Casanello works on the triple crime case, and Servini de Cubría on a case of drugs trafficking. Corradi refused to be extradited, claiming that he does not trust the Argentine judiciary, that his family is in Paraguay, and that his life would be at risk if he returns. As a result, the extradition request may take two months to be answered.

== Personal life ==
Perez Corradi has been described as a man of few words who keeps a low profile. “He is not the sort who puts all his eggs in one basket.” He and his ex-wife, Liliana Raquel Aurehhuliu, have three children. He is said to have a home in Pilar, in Buenos Aires, and another in Spain, which has proven “very useful” in connection with the export of illicit substances to Europe.
