= Colegio Nacional de Monserrat =

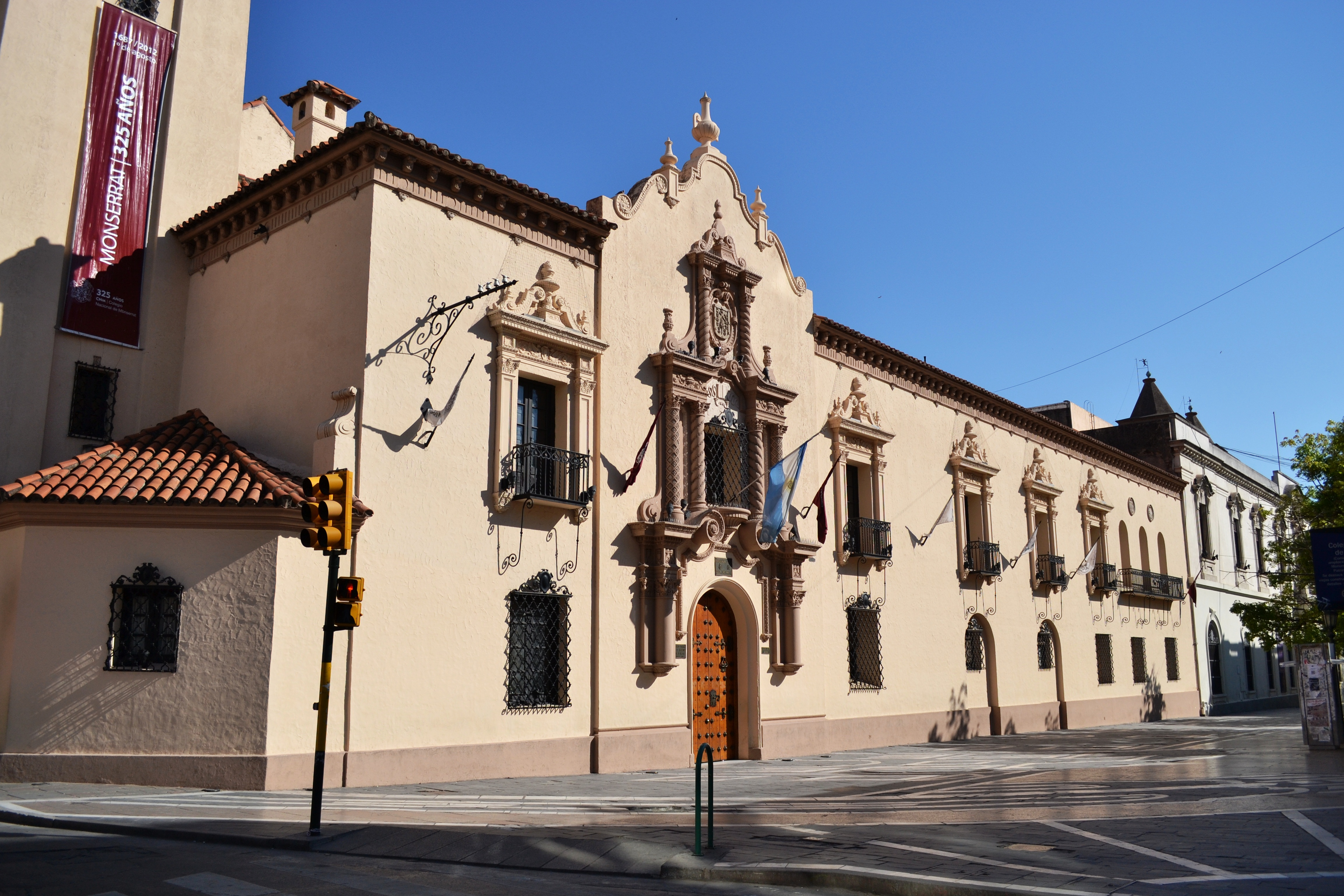
- The College in 2012

Location
- Obispo Trejo 294; Córdoba, Córdoba; Argentina; 31°25′07″S 64°11′13″W

Information
- Type: Public secondary
- Motto: En virtud y Letras
- Established: August 1, 1687; 339 years ago
- Founder: Father Ignacio Duarte Quirós, Society of Jesus
- Rector: Aldo Guerra
- Gender: Coeducational
- Enrollment: 1,589 (high school); 500 (middle school)
- Campus: Urban
- Colors: (Maroon and white)
- Athletics: Basketball, fencing, soccer
- Mascot: Duende
- Nickname: Monse
- Affiliation: UNC
- Former names: Real Colegio Convictorio de Nuestra Señora de Monserrat · Real Universidad de San Carlos y de Nuestra Señora de Monserra
- Notable alumni: Ramón J. Cárcano, Juan José Castelli, José Figueroa Alcorta, Gregorio Funes, Leopoldo Lugones, Dalmacio Vélez Sársfield
- Website: monserrat.unc.edu.ar

Colegio Nacional de Monserrat is a public college preparatory high school in Córdoba, Argentina. Founded in 1687 by the Society of Jesus, the school is the oldest of its type in Argentina.

The school, patterned after the European gymnasium, is dependent on the National University of Córdoba (UNC).

Colegio Nacional de Monserrat was designated National Historic Monument of Argentina in 1938.

== History ==
=== Parochial era ===
The Real Colegio Convictorio de Nuestra Señora de Monserrat (Royal Boarding School of Our Lady of Montserrat) was founded in Córdoba on August 1, 1687, by the Society of Jesus. Its founder and first director was Father Ignacio Duarte Quirós, a Córdoba priest who volunteered and donated all his property to that effect. King Charles II of Spain signed the decree authorizing the establishment, whose implementation was entrusted to the Governor of Cordóba, Captain Tomás Félix de Argandoña. The college began operations as a boarding school on April 10, 1695, and was ultimately awarded a permanent certification by King Philip V, on December 2, 1716.

The college was transferred to the Franciscan Order upon the 1767 Papal suppression of the Society of Jesus. The college was moved from the Duarte House to the current location, and its relocation was completed on February 9, 1782.

The institution was transferred in 1807 to Secular Clergy, pursuant to a Royal Decree of 1800 signed by King Charles IV of Spain by which he created the "Royal University of San Carlos and Our Lady of Montserrat." This new charter, which included what later became the National University of Córdoba, was accompanied by major curricular reforms enacted by the Rector of the University and College, Dean Gregorio Funes.

=== Public era ===
The College and the University were nationalized in 1854. The former was converted from a boarding school into a secondary school in 1858, and under the aegis of the "National School" system administered by the National Institute of Public Instruction (later the Ministry of Education) from 1881 onward. A new building was commissioned by Dr. Eusebio de Bedoya, and completed in 1864.

The school was made an affiliate of the University in 1907. The building was adorned in 1927 with Spanish Colonial Revival doorways, windows, and fixtures during a renovation commissioned by Rector Rafael Bonet, and designed by Jaime Roca. monument to its founder, Father Ignacio Duarte Quirós, was unveiled in the central courtyard in 1937 (the 250th anniversary of the school's founding). The College of Monserrat was declared a National Historic Monument on July 14, 1938. The Monserrat College became a center of nationalist and conservative agitation in subsequent decades. The college newspaper, El Pampero (later renamed Pampero Cordubensis) was established by fascist writer Enrique Osés, and became a leading nationalist publication prior to the 1943 coup d'état.

Ever since its founding up until 1998, the institution was an all-boys school. However, in May 1997 it was regulated, through an ordinance issued by the Honorable Consejo Superior of the Universidad Nacional de Córdoba, that all aspiring students could enroll in the school, despite their gender. Eventually, in 1998, the college of Monserrat, known for being an all-boys school, was made coeducational, with the admission of the first official 44 girls into the institution. On November 12, 2004, the first mixed-gender graduating class finished its studies and the girls received their diplomas; one of them even graduated with honors due to her high grades throughout her education. Despite some mild disputes with those from past graduating classes, the girls were able to adapt to the school quite easily. The school's total enrollment in 2010 included, for the first time, more girls than boys. The Jesuit Block of Córdoba, which includes the campus, was declared a World Heritage Site by UNESCO on November 28, 2000.

In 2015, the gender distribution was 55% female students and 45% male students.

== Overview ==
The College of Monserrat includes both a high school. The former is organized in nine departments: Philosophy, Social Sciences, History/Geography, Letters, Exact Sciences, Natural Sciences, Arts, Physical Education, and Humanities. The school maintains the Professor Alfredo Ruibal Library, with almost 20,000 volumes, and the Historical Museum.

The school is administered by a Secondary Educational Level Advisory Board composed of the Director of the college (who presides), the Academic Deputy, a Regent, the teaching faculty (represented by nine members, six professors, two tutors, and a professor or teacher as faculty representative), two student representatives, a non-faculty staffer, and a parent.

The Middle School Level is governed by the Director, a Deputy, and a Regent, as well as a delegation of three teachers, an assistant teacher, and a student representative.

=== Admissions ===
Applicants to enter the first year of the school must take and pass an eliminatory exam, which includes a language test and a math test. Admission is by order of merit until completing 240 places.

Every year since 2010, more than 1,100 students take the entrance exams. Constituting an acceptance rate below 22%.

== Gallery ==
Spanish style

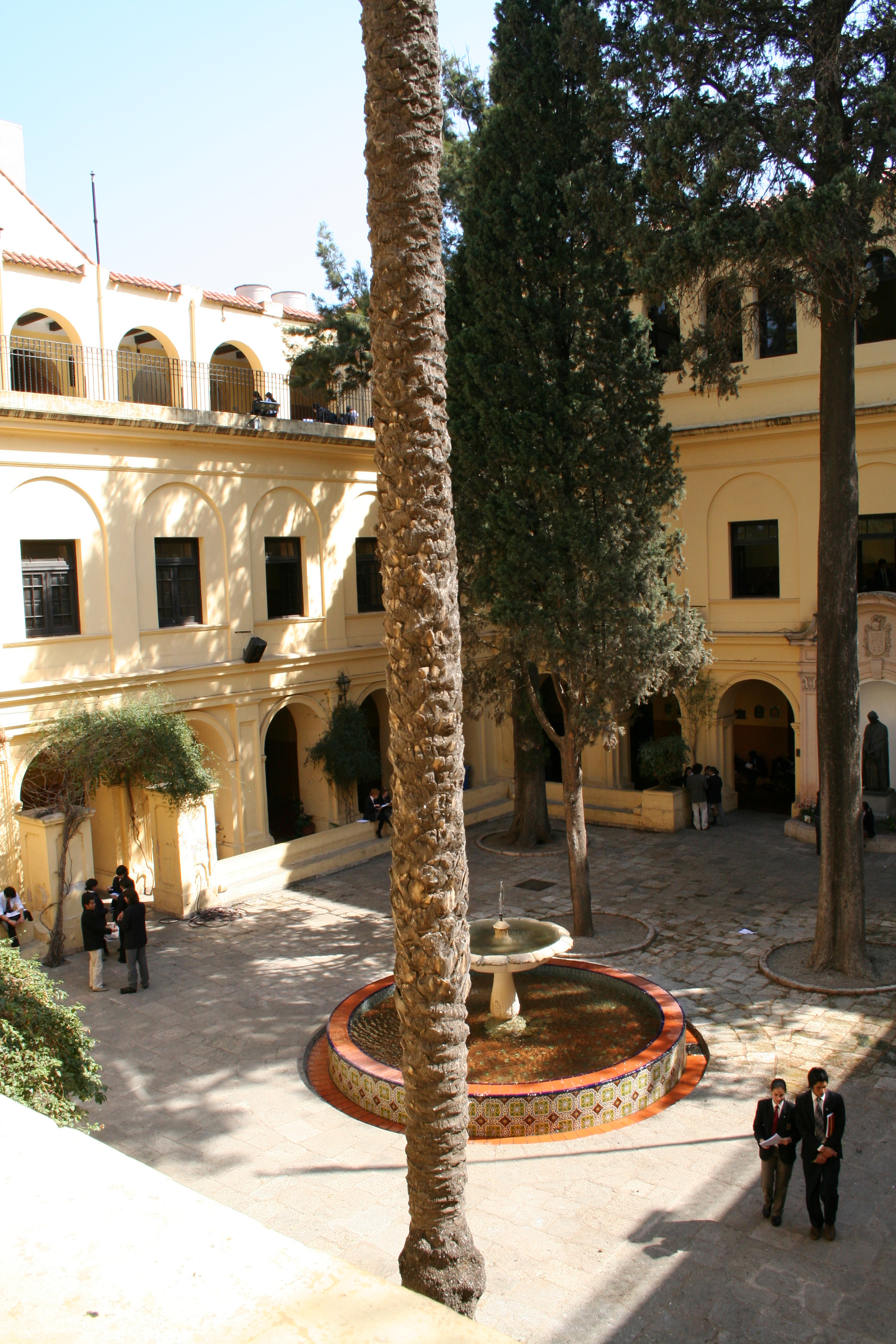
Courtyard

Facade at night

Fountain

Clock tower

Detail

Classroom

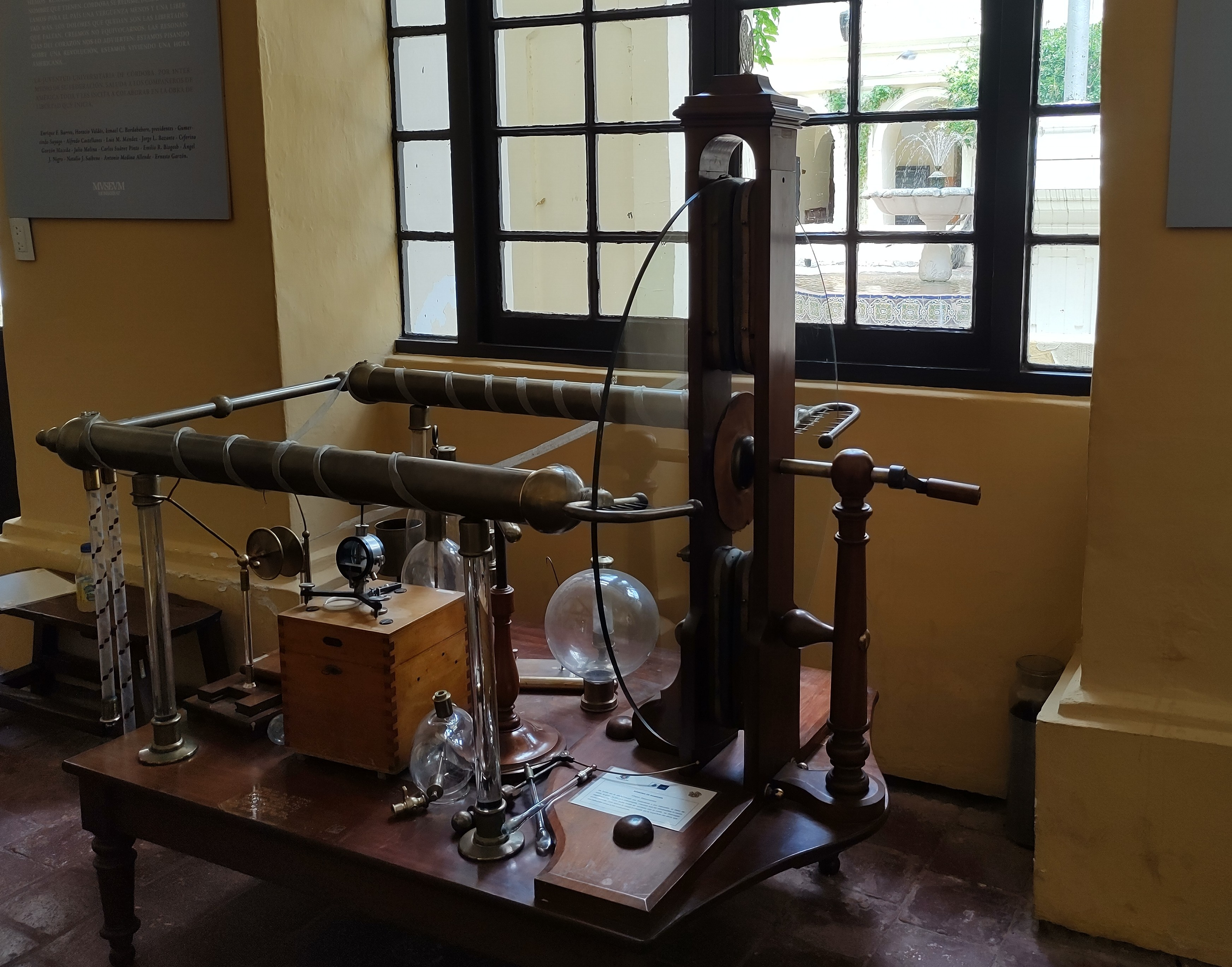
Ramdsen machine

== See also ==
- List of Jesuit sites
