= Silvio Soldán =

Argentinian TV host

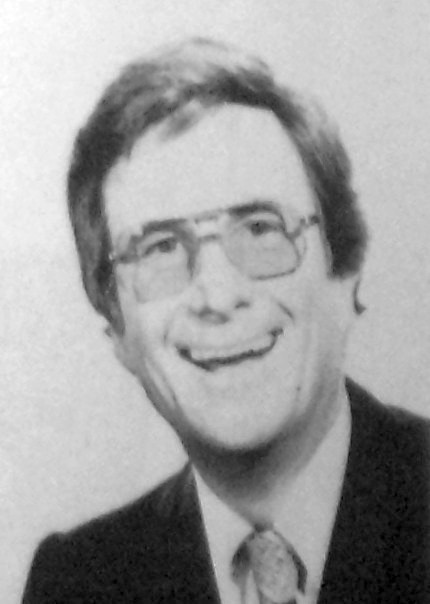
Silvio Soldán

Silvio Soldán (born March 26, 1935, in Colonia Belgrano) is a TV host from Argentina.

== Career ==
Soldán has worked in the game show Feliz domingo para la juventud. He currently works in the TV channel "Volver".
