= No hay 2 sin 3 =

Argentine comedy television series

No hay 2 sin 3 is an Argentine comedy television series broadcast in 2004 and 2006 on Canal 9. It stars Pablo Granados, Pachu Peña, and Freddy Villarreal, with Jose Maria Listorti replacing Granados in 2006.
