= Silvia Süller =

Argentine media personality

- Born: Silvia del Carmen Süller; 10 February 1958 (age 68); Buenos Aires, Argentina
- Years active: 1986–present
- Spouses: Jorge Graviotto (m. 1978; div. 1980) Miguel A. Zulli (m. 1982; div. 1986) Silvio Soldán (m. 1986; div. 1992) Carlos Ponce (m. 1999; div. 2005)
- Children: 2

Silvia del Carmen Süller (born 10 February 1958) is an Argentine media and television personality, occasional singer and ex glamour model. She's the elder sister of television personality Guido Süller and ex soccer player Marcelo Süller, they both also well known in Argentina.

Her first appearance on Argentine TV was on 30 March 1986, in Silvio Soldán's show Grandes Valores del Tango. She fell in love with the TV host and married him a few months later, having a baby, Christian Silvio, in 1991. In 1987, she had her first cosmetic surgery, a breast implant, which would help her in her future showgirl career.

When she and Soldán split up in 1992, she started her high-profile career, working as a showgirl in many theater shows with Argentine comedians such as Jorge Corona, Beto César, José Luis Gioia, Carlos Sánchez and Tristán, among others, throughout the 1990s and the early 2000s (decade). She had a very successful showgirl career, though she defines herself as a "show-woman".

In 1997 she recorded a music album called Sullermanía.

In 2007, she took part in Bailando por un sueño (literally "Dancing for a dream") a TV show very similar to Dancing with the Stars, being the first eliminated.

Her life has been largely exposed in the media and the tabloids, so that the public could see her involved in a lot of scandals, including her ex-husband, ex mother-in-law, her parents, her brothers, her sister Norma and national celebrities such as Moria Casán o Jorge Rial.

She has stated several times that she is a personal admirer of American star Marilyn Monroe (she named her daughter after Monroe) and Susana Giménez. On April 8, 2011, Süller was compared to British celebrity Katie Price in The Sun.
