= Martín Rodríguez (politician) =

Argentine politician and soldier

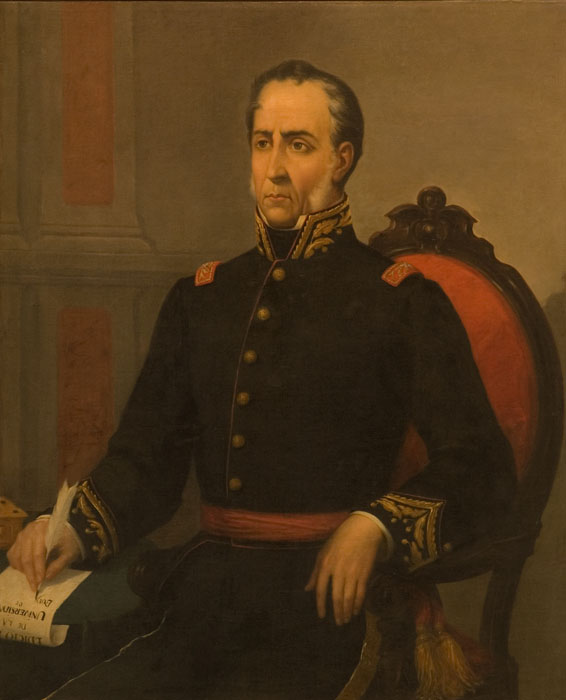

Governor of Buenos Aires Province
- In office September 20, 1820 – April 2, 1824
- Preceded by: Manuel Dorrego
- Succeeded by: Juan Gregorio de Las Heras

Personal details
- Born: July 4, 1771 Buenos Aires, Governorate of the Río de la Plata, Viceroyalty of Peru, Spanish Empire, Kingdom of Spain
- Died: March 5, 1845 (aged 73) Montevideo, Oriental State of Uruguay, Gobierno de la Defensa
- Resting place: La Recoleta Cemetery
- Party: Patriot, Unitarian
- Spouse: Manuela Carrasco
- Education: Real Colegio San Carlos
- Occupation: Military
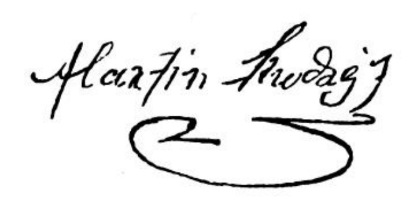
- Signature

Military service
- Allegiance: United Provinces of the Río de la Plata
- Rank: Commander; Brigadier General
- Battles/wars: Argentine War of Independence

Martín Rodríguez (4 July 1771 – 5 March 1845) was an Argentine politician and soldier.

== Biography ==
Born in Buenos Aires to Rufina and Fermín Rodríguez, he inherited a ranch and managed the estate until 1806. He then took part in the resistance to the British invasions of the Río de la Plata, during the Napoleonic Wars and later played an important role in the events of the May Revolution of 1810. Upon the establishment of the First Junta which resulted, he was sent to the province of Entre Ríos to support the activities of Manuel Belgrano in the Paraguay campaign. He married Manuela Carrasco in 1810, and they had 14 children.

Later, as colonel of a unit of Hussars, Rodríguez organized the militias that menaced a political meeting in April 1811, in an attempt to support Cornelio Saavedra. As a result of this, Rodríguez was temporarily imprisoned in San Juan, Argentina. The following year Rodríguez intervened in the Battle of Salta. He was chief of the general staff of the Army of the North, and later acted as the president of Charcas. Rejoining the troops, he participated in the Third Upper Peru campaign, fighting in the defeats of Venta and Media and in the Battle of Sipe-Sipe.

Following months of political anarchy resulting from the collapse of the Argentine Constitution of 1819, Rodríguez was named Governor of Buenos Aires Province in September 1820. He appointed Bernardino Rivadavia as Minister of State and undertook a series of reforms. He enacted land reform, promoting the use of fallow lands, limited the power of the Church, the police and of the military, restored relations with Northeastern Caudillo Estanislao López, and founded the city of Tandil, the nation's first Natural Sciences Museum the Bank of the Province of Buenos Aires and the University of Buenos Aires, among other public institutions. This reforms faced a strong opposition from clerics, like Francisco de Paula Castañeda, or conservative politicians, like Gregorio García de Tagle. The latter led a short-lived mutiny against the government that cost him the exile.

He was succeeded in his post in 1824 by Juan Gregorio de las Heras, and returned to military duty. Rodríguez took part in the suppression of indigenous raids, and headed the Observation Army during the Cisplatine War, from 1825 to 1827. Rodríguez returned to Buenos Aires, and later became an opponent of Governor Juan Manuel de Rosas, joining Unitarian League leader José María Paz in an 1841-42 rebellion against the Federalist regime. The uprising failed, however, and Rodríguez was exiled to Montevideo, Uruguay, where he died in 1845.

He was interred in La Recoleta Cemetery. The city of General Rodríguez, west of Buenos Aires, was named in his honor upon its establishment in 1878.
