= General Rodríguez =

- City
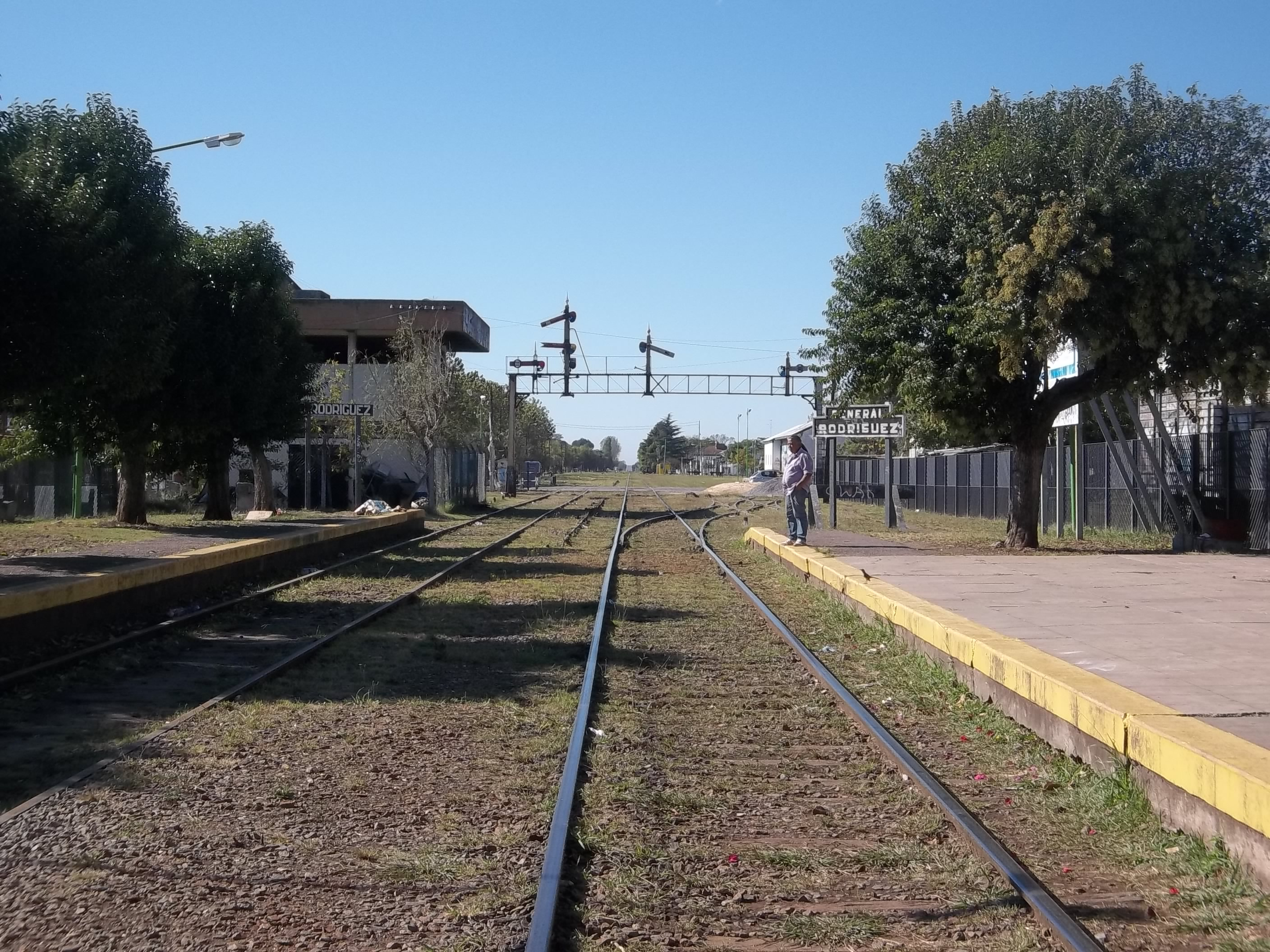
- General Rodríguez railway station

- Location in Greater Buenos Aires
- Coordinates: 34°37′S 58°57′W
- Country: Argentina
- Province: Buenos Aires
- Partido: General Rodríguez
- Elevation: 28 m (92 ft)

Population (2001 census [INDEC])
  - Total: 63,317
- CPA Base: B 1748
- Area code: +54 237

General Rodríguez is a city in the urban agglomeration of Greater Buenos Aires, Buenos Aires Province, Argentina. It is the administrative centre of General Rodríguez Partido. The murders known as the triple crime took place there in 2008.
