= Marcelo Tinelli =

Argentine television and radio host, media producer and businessman

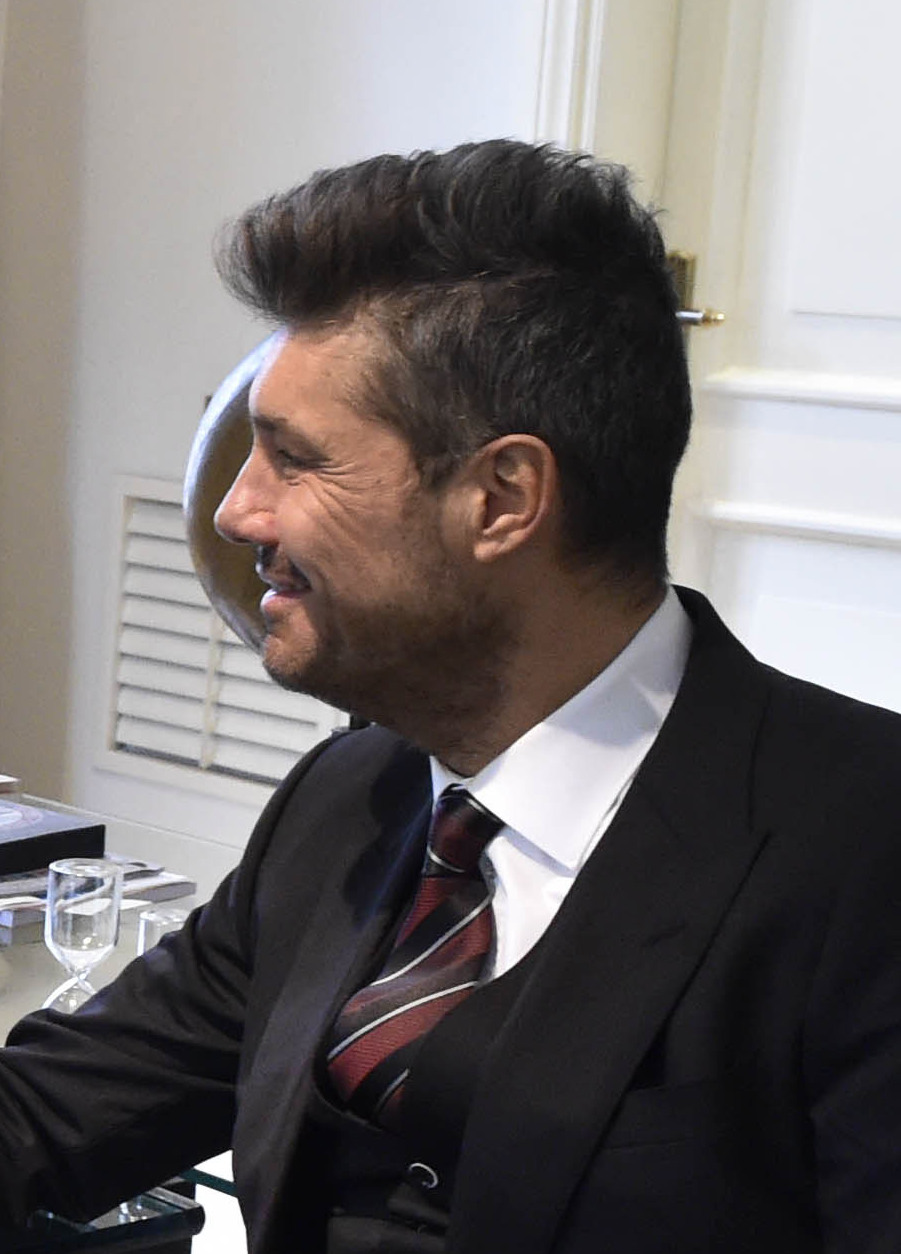
- Tinelli in 2016
- Born: Marcelo Hugo Tinelli Domeño; 1 April 1960 (age 66); San Carlos de Bolívar, Buenos Aires, Argentina
- Occupations: Businessman; television host and producer; football executive
- Spouses: Soledad Aquino (m. 1986; div. 1993); Paula Robles (m. 1998; div. 2009)
- Partners: María Alejandra Garayalde (1981–1985); Guillermina Valdés (2012–2022); Milett Figueroa (2023–present)
- Children: 5

Marcelo Hugo Tinelli (born 1 April 1960) is an Argentine television and radio host, media producer and businessman, best known as the host of the TV show Showmatch broadcast on Argentina's El Trece.

One of the most famous supporters of sports club San Lorenzo de Almagro, in 2019 Tinelli became president of the club after winning the election by more than 80% of the vote. Since March 2020, Tinelli is also president of Liga Profesional de Fútbol, the association that rules and organises Primera División championships.

== Career ==
=== Beginning ===
Tinelli was working on Radio Rivadavia as football sportscaster before Juan Alberto Badía brought him to TV to Badía y Compañía in 1983. In 1990, after several years as sports commentator, he created the light-content Videomatch, based on sport results, easy jokes, hidden cameras and bloopers.

Afterwards, he hosted the variety-musical show Ritmo de la Noche which featured live performances of international acts including Bon Jovi, Poison, Duran Duran and former Queen member Brian May. Around 1996 the program left the lightest contents and included musical shows and guests. In 1999 he received the Golden Martín Fierro Award for Videomatch. The show still airs, as Showmatch.

He created the TV production company Ideas del Sur (Ideas from the South), which has produced many TV shows including Okupas, Buenos Vecinos, Tumberos, Fugitivos and Los Roldán. He also bought Radio Uno FM station, and the Spanish Segunda División football club CD Badajoz.

In 2002, he helped found the volleyball team Club Ciudad de Bolívar, based in his native San Carlos de Bolívar. The team became one of the most successful of the Argentine league.

=== Videomatch/ShowMatch ===
He became popular as the presenter of Videomatch on the Argentine network Telefe. The variety show had sketches, musical guests, contests, and introduced bloopers to the Argentine audience.

Tinelli caused controversy in 2005, when he announced plans to switch to Canal 9, the third highest rated network. His show increased the average audience of Canal 9 by giving the network the highest-rated show in the country.

In 2006 Tinelli announced a switch to El Trece, Telefe's largest competitor. Tinelli works at El Trece since then, and also produces TV dramas with his own production company, Ideas del Sur. The show title changed from Videomatch to Showmatch since the Videomatch name was owned by Telefe. Showmatch is also the name of a short-lived version of Videomatch that aired in Spain.

ShowMatch included many segments of contests with stage acts, such as dancing or singing. In 2009 it included a segment called Gran Cuñado (Big Brother-in-Law) with parodies of Argentine politicians, that generated great stir in real political world.

== Personal life ==
Tinelli is the son of a family of Argentine parents with Italian ancestry. He married his first wife, Soledad Aquino, in 1986. The couple had two children: Micaela (born in 1988), and Candelaria (nicknamed "Lelé", born in 1990). The couple divorced in 1993. Following his divorce, in 1997 he married for the second time with Paula Robles. They met at one of the shows he hosted (Ritmo de la noche). The couple lasted 12 years; during that period of time, they had two children, Francisco and Juana. The couple divorced in 2009. In April 2014, Tinelli had his fifth child, Lorenzo, with Guillermina Valdes, with whom he now shares a friendly relationship after breaking up. He is currently dating the famous Peruvian top model and actress Milett Figueroa, with whom he started a romantic relationship after meeting up at the Argentine show "Bailando 2023" and they continue their relationship up to the current date.

2018-present

In 2018, following the bankruptcy of the TV production company Ideas del Sur, Marcelo founded his new production company, LaFlia contenidos. It was the first company focused on digital content and services, and it has produced various TV shows aired on national and international networks, including Showmatch (2018-2021 and 2023-present). Marcelo also made his debut as a film producer with La Reina del Miedo and has produced several comedy plays. Four years later, he produced his last TV singing show for the Argentine channel El Trece, an adaptation of the British program All Together Now. In 2023, after a brief hiatus from television, he was hired by América TV as host, artistic director, and programming manager. He currently oversees the production of his own family documentary, Los Tinelli, which is streamed on Amazon Prime Video, and features performances by his entire family.

== Filmography ==
=== TV series ===
| Year | Title | Character/Role | Notes |
|---|---|---|---|
| 2007 | Patito Feo | Himself (as the host of Showmatch) | Episodes 154 and 155 |

=== Television ===
| Year | Title | Role |
|---|---|---|
| 1990-2004 | Videomatch | Host |
| 2009 | High School Musical: The Selection | Host |
| 2009 | Bailando Kids | Host |
| 2009 | El Musical de tus Sueños | Host |
| 2006-2019, 2023 | Showmatch: Bailando por un sueño | Host |
| 2022 | Canta Conmigo Ahora | Host |
| 2025 | Los Tinelli | Himself |

| Preceded by Santo Biasatti | Golden Martín Fierro; 1998 | Succeeded by Fútbol de primera |
