= Sebastián Casanello =

Argentine judge

Sebastián Casanello (Buenos Aires, December 14, 1974) is an Argentine Federal Judge.

== Biography ==
After twenty years working with prosecutors and judges in the federal criminal system, Casanello was appointed federal judge, for which he had to pass a public exam, becoming the youngest of the twelve federal criminal judges of Buenos Aires, Argentina.

He attended Colegio Nacional de Buenos Aires high school, a traditional institution supported by Universidad de Buenos Aires (UBA). In UBA he got his law degree, which was passed with honors.

Since he occupies his judge bench, he has worked in several important cases, such as "the K money trail", in which more than twenty five persons were indicted and had to stand trial. The case is still under investigation.

He also intervened in investigations for environmental crimes allegedly committed by multinationals, human rights violations in the 1970s and many cases of public and private corruption.
