= Pablo Granados =

Argentine actor, comedian and singer (born 1965)

Pablo Granados (born September 13, 1965) is an Argentine actor, comedian and singer. Much of his work is in television, particularly for Canal 9 and América TV. He is well known for the 2004 series No hay 2 sin 3, which aired on Canal 9.
