= Showmatch =

Argentine television series (2005-2021)

- Genre: Comedy, Variety show, reality show
- Presented by: Marcelo Tinelli
- Opening theme: "Twist and Shout" by The Beatles
- Country of origin: Argentina
- Original language: Spanish
- No. of seasons: 15
- No. of episodes: 1649

Production
- Executive producers: Federico Hoppe; Pablo Prada
- Running time: approx. 120 minutes
- Production companies: Ideas del Sur (former); LaFlia Contenidos (present)

Original release
- Network: Canal 9 (2005-2006); El Trece (2006-2012, 2014-2021)
- Release: April 4, 2005 – December 10, 2021

Related
- Videomatch

Showmatch is an Argentine television programme, broadcast by eltrece. It replaced the comedy show Videomatch in 2004, and from 2006 has produced the dancing contest Bailando por un Sueño ("Dancing for a Dream"), along with similar contests such as Cantando por un Sueño ("Singing for a Dream"), Patinando por un Sueño ("Skating for a Dream"), and El Musical de tus Sueños ("The Musical of your Dreams"). In 2009, it presented "Gran Cuñado" ("Big Brother-in-Law"), a parody of the reality show Big Brother, a segment carried over from Videomatch.

Showmatch was one of Argentina's most-watched programs, and scored as the country's highest-rated television show in 2010 and 2011.

It has played host to a number of celebrity guests from around the world, including former boxer Mike Tyson and footballer Ronaldinho.

== History ==
Showmatch is the new name of the program presented by Marcelo Tinelli, succeeding Videomatch, a sports and comedy show.

On September 2, 2005, Tinelli signed a major contract with Artear, operator of eltrece, thus opting to move to the channel of the solcito (little sun), where he eventually would set the program since 19 September 2005. The negotiations between the two companies had begun in April, at the initiative of Adrian Suar, director of programming of the station. As background, Suar and Tinelli already had preliminary negotiations in an attempt to moving during 1997.

"This is a bet that transcends economics, I feel it is a long-term path that tends to insert the program into a broader platform, which will open more possibilities to Argentine production and international expansion," Tinelli said when closing the contract. Meanwhile, Federico Hoppe and Pablo Prada became the main producers of the program. Since its inception, the program's eight seasons remained to be issued consecutively until the end of the cycle in 2012, where the program stopped being broadcast until 2014, the year in which the program retakes its emissions.

In its first season (2005) and half of Season 2 (2006) the program continued the format of its predecessor Videomatch, with the famous hidden cameras, music, skits with guest artists, humorous sketches, among others, but due to the popularity of the segment Bailando por un Sueño (Dancing for a dream), since 2007, it became an annual competition and the program was entirely based upon this, as well as Cantando por un Sueño (Singing for a dream) and Patinando por un Sueño (Skating for a dream).

In 2009 upon celebrating 20 years, it returned to the original format during the first half of the year, also incorporating the segments Gran Cuñado (Big Brother-in-Law) and Bailando Kids. As of August it began airing the contest El Musical de tus Sueños (The musical of your dreams).

In 2010, a new segment called Baila Argentina was incorporated, in which cities across the country competed through dances with massive people calling, but after some emissions, it stopped airing in Showmatch because of time, and it became part of Sábado Show (a show broadcast by the same channel and hosted by cast member José María Listorti).

In 2011, the show only aired Bailando por un sueño, and in the last 7 seasons (2012, 2014-2019), in addition to this classic contest, there were parodies of celebrities, politicians and people from the show business appearing to interact with the host and the judges.

== Production ==
=== Performances ===
An important feature of the show are televised performances made for the start of each season, which dubs of movies or series with a humorous tone are shown, parodies of several films, and large shows of presentation, in which different musical pieces are mixed accompanied by several choreography parts, carried out by the show's team of dancers and artists from different acrobatic disciplines. These stagings are prepared months in advance to be presented to the season premiere.

Within the format Bailando por un Sueño, there were other outstanding artistic productions: the so-called "special rhythms" which usually consist of acrobatic discipline performances, full of visual effects. For example, the productions known as:

- "Bailando bajo la lluvia" (Dancing under the rain): where participants must dance under water in a scenery set to simulate a city street. Such show is that each couple occupies this space to develop different storylines with dancing. The climatic effect is achieved using more than 25 sprinklers that spew water steadily toward the track. For this, the studio is fitted with a drain system to support the flow of water. Producers were based on the film Singin' in the Rain for the realization of the "rhythm".
- "Cuarto giratorio" (Rotating room): which was incorporated during the seventh season, based on a cubic element of about three meters and a half edge, similar to a room with bare front, where a camera is put only inside the cube. There is where couples must develop the choreography, while this is driven by a hydraulic mechanism which in turn is controlled with a command joystick, by the coach of the couple, who imbues speed to the unidirectional room (right-left). While transmitted by television, the effect of seeing the participants as if they walked through the roof and side is shown. The construction of the cube is done in a steel structure, in which a wooden room is decorated differently, according to the theme of the choreography.
- "Bioesfera" (Biosphere) is another example of these assemblies, which is an orbit built with the same material as the pole dance pole, whose pendulous movement depends on a ball bearing that rotates over its own axis. It is hung in the middle of the studio, and there, the participants must perform their stunts while the music plays.
- "Aquadance", to this day, is the production with most technical requirement. It is a "rhythm" created in the third season, after the idea of finding and preparing new choreography to capture the attention of the audience. With this, the producers decided to make a big show of aquatic acrobatics, similar to those made in Las Vegas. This discipline was adapted and presented in the program as one of the dance rhythms. In the routine, the program's couples were immersed in acrylic fountains, making figures to the beat of a music track. It was so successful that since then, the show was held every year, having been modified three times. The second time it was done, there were three fountains used with a dancing water system that worked with the progression of the performance, fireworks combined with music and projection effects. Finally, since 2011, the three acrylic fountains mounted in one piece, with two slides and iron supports holding a fourth fountain, located more than 2 meters high, are used. From there the scenery is mounted in a fiberglass pool, covering the dance floor, with two waterfalls and 22 peaks of dancing waters. For all three occasions, the pools were filled with more than 10,000 liters of warm water, and counted with a new recycling system.

== Controversy ==
The show has also been an ongoing source of controversy, and has been accused of sexual discrimination and objectification of women.

== Awards ==
Date of the ceremony	Award	Category	Nominee	Result
May 29, 2006	Martin Fierro 2005	Male Presenter Labor	Marcelo Tinelli	nominated
May 29, 2006	Martin Fierro 2005	General Interest Program	Showmatch	nominated
May 29, 2006	Martin Fierro 2005	Male Presenter	Marcelo Tinelli	nominated
May 23, 2007	Martin Fierro 2006	Male Presenter	Marcelo Tinelli	Winner
May 23, 2007	Martin Fierro 2006	Best Overall Production	Showmatch	nominated
May 23, 2007	Martin Fierro 2006	Best Reality Show	Showmatch	Winner
July 2, 2008	Martin Fierro 2007	Male Presenter Labor	Marcelo Tinelli	Winner
July 2, 2008	Martin Fierro 2007	Best Overall Production	Showmatch	Winner
July 2, 2008	Martin Fierro 2007	Best Reality Show	Showmatch	Winner
August 19, 2009	Martin Fierro 2008	Male Presenting Work	Marcelo Tinelli	Winner
August 19, 2009	Martin Fierro 2008	Best Overall Production	Showmatch	Winner
August 19, 2009	Martin Fierro 2008	best Reality	Showmatch	nominated
May 2, 2010	Martin Fierro 2009	Male Presenter	Marcelo Tinelli	nominated
May 2, 2010	Martin Fierro 2009	Best Male Humorous Work	Martin Bossi	Winner
May 2, 2010	Martin Fierro 2009	Best Female Humorous Work	Anita Martinez	Winner
May 2, 2010	Martin Fierro 2009	Best Overall Production	Showmatch	Winner
May 2, 2010	Martin Fierro 2009	Best Reality Show	Showmatch	nominated
May 22, 2011	Martin Fierro 2010	best Reality	Showmatch	nominated
May 22, 2011	Martin Fierro 2010	Male Presenter Work	Marcelo Tinelli	Winner
May 22, 2011	Martin Fierro 2010	Best Overall Production	Showmatch	Winner
October 11, 2011	Kids' Choice Awards Argentina	Pro-Social Award	Fundación Ideas del Sur	Winner
May 27, 2012	Martin Fierro 2011	Best Reality Show	Showmatch	Winner
May 27, 2012	Martin Fierro 2011	Male Presenter	Marcelo Tinelli	Winner
May 27, 2012	Martin Fierro 2011	Best Overall Production	Showmatch	Winner
November 17, 2012	Tato Awards	Entertainment program	Showmatch	nominated
November 17, 2012	Tato Awards	Direction in Non-Fiction	Alejandro Ripoll	nominated
November 17, 2012	Tato Awards	Production in Non-Fiction	Showmatch	nominated
November 17, 2012	Tato Awards	Male Presenter	Marcelo Tinelli	nominated
November 17, 2012	Tato Awards	Program of the Year	Showmatch	nominated
August 5, 2013	Martin Fierro 2012	Entertainment	Showmatch	Winner
August 5, 2013	Martin Fierro 2012	Male Presenter	Marcelo Tinelli	nominated
August 5, 2013	Martin Fierro 2012	Best Overall Production	Showmatch	nominated
June 13, 2015	Martin Fierro 2014	Male Presenter	Marcelo Tinelli	Winner
June 13, 2015	Martin Fierro 2014	Integral Production	Showmatch	Winner
June 13, 2015	Martin Fierro 2014	Direction	Alejandro Ripoll	nominated
June 13, 2015	Martin Fierro 2014	Reality Show	Showmatch	Winner
June 13, 2015	Martin Fierro 2014	Humorous Work in TV	Fatima Florez	Winner
May 15, 2016	Martín Fierro 2016	Best Reality Show	Showmatch	Winner
June 18, 2017	Martín Fierro 2017	Male Presenter Labor	Marcelo Tinelli	Winner
June 18, 2017	Martín Fierro 2017	Integral Production	Showmatch	Winner
June 9, 2019	Martín Fierro 2019	Special Martín Fierro Award for Trajectory	Marcelo Tinelli	Winner
May 13, 2022	Martín Fierro 2021	Best reality	Showmatch	nominated
May 13, 2022	Martín Fierro 2021	Best judges of TV	Ángel de Brito, Carolina «Pampita» Ardohain, Guillermina Valdés, Jimena Barón, Hernán Piquín	nominated
May 13, 2022	Martín Fierro 2021	Best Male Driving	Marcelo Tinelli	nominated
