= Bailando 2018 =

- Season 13
- Presented by: Marcelo Tinelli
- Judges: Judge: Ángel De Brito; Laurita Fernández; Florencia Peña; Marcelo Polino; B.A.R: Mariela Anchipi; Lourdes Sánchez; Jorge Moliniers
- Winner: Julián Serrano
- Runner-up: Jimena Barón

Release
- Original network: El Trece
- Original release: 3 September – 20 December 2018

Season chronology
- ← Previous; Bailando 2017 Next → Bailando 2019

Bailando 2018 is the thirteenth season of Bailando por un Sueño. It started on 3 September 2018, on the El Trece network.

== Cast ==
=== Couples ===
On 24 July, the celebrities and professional partners were confirmed as program presenters during a press conference.

Celebrity	Professional partner or Celebrity	Status	Ref.
Florencia Tesouro; Model & TV personality	Conrado Moressi	Eliminated 1^{st} on 20 September 2018	
Ezequiel "El Polaco" Cwirkaluk; Singer	Bárbara Silenzi; Dancer & TV personality	Eliminated 2^{nd} on 20 September 2018	
Joaquín Álvarez; TV host & radio	Yamila Ramírez	Eliminated 3^{rd} on 1 October 2018	
Anamá Ferreyra; Former model & businesswoman	Joel Ledesma; Conrado Moressi (Week 3)	Eliminated 4^{th} on 11 October 2018	
Florencia Vigna (Note: Florencia Vigna leaves the competition for labor reasons. In its place enters María del Cerro.); Actress	— (Note: His dance partner (who is also a celebrity) does not leave and continues in the competition.)	Withdrew on 19 October 2018	
Marcela Baños; TV host	Matías Payen	Eliminated 5^{th} on 19 October 2018	
Sofía Jiménez; Model, journalist & TV host	Maximiliano Buitrago	Eliminated 6^{th} on 19 October 2018	
Benjamín Alfonso; Actor & model	Camila Méndez Ribeiro	Eliminated 7^{th} on 29 October 2018	
Flavio Mendoza (Note: Flavio Mendoza leaves the contest for work reasons.); Dancer, choreographer & art director	Belén Pouchán (Note: Belén Pouchán leaves the contest for personal reasons.); Contortionist	Withdrew on 30 October 2018	
Inés Storck Banquer; Laura Fernández's mother	Facundo Arrigoni	Eliminated 8^{th} on 6 November 2018	
Gabriel Usandivaras; Professional dancer	Rebeca "Becky" Vázquez; Vedette	Eliminated 9^{th} on 13 November 2018	
Lucas Velasco; Actor	Florencia Marcasoli; Vedette	Eliminated 10^{th} on 20 November 2018	
Esmeralda Mitre; Actress	Santiago Almaraz	Eliminated 11^{th} on 27 November 2018	
Natalie Weber; Model	Iván Anrriquez	Eliminated 12^{th} on 4 December 2018	
María Sol Pérez; Model & TV personality	Damián García	Eliminated 13^{th} on 10 December 2018	
Soledad Fandiño; Model & actress	Nicolás Villalba	Eliminated 14^{th} on 13 December 2018	
Cinthia Fernández; Gymnast, vedette & TV personality	Gonzalo Gerber	Eliminated 16^{th} on 14 December 2018	
Diego Ramos; Actor	Lourdes Sánchez (Note: Macarena Rinaldi was her original professional partner, but because she suffered a torn ligament during a trial that forces her to undergo surgery, she is disqualified. His replacement is Lourdes Sánchez.); Professional dancer	Eliminated 16^{th} on 14 December 2018	
Micaela Viciconte; TV personality	Ignacio Saraceni	Semi-finalists on 17 December 2018	
María del Cerro; Actress, model & TV host	Facundo Mazzei; Professional dancer	Semi-finalists on 18 December 2018	
Jimena Barón; Actress & singer	Mauro Caiazza	Runners-up on 20 December 2018	
Julián Serrano; YouTuber, actor & singer	Sofía Morandi; Actress & Instagrammer	Winners on 20 December 2018	

=== Hosts and judges ===
Marcelo Tinelli return as host, while judges Marcelo Polino and Ángel de Brito all returned this season. Pampita Ardohaín and Moria Casán did not return this season as a permanent judge. Laura Fernández, professional dancer, actress & host, and Florencia Peña, actress & comedian, become the new judge.

It also includes the incorporation of the BAR (Bailando Assistant Referee), inspired by the VAR (Video Assistant Referee), which is a video assistance system integrated by Lourdes Sánchez, Mariela Anchipi and Jorge Moliniers. Only the judges, choreographers, the head of coach and Marcelo Tinelli can ask for the BAR. The production is the one that authorizes if the BAR can intervene, the order is made after the judges score. In the galas, you will have the possibility to add or subtract a point. In the duel, the BAR can break the tie. In the semifinals and in the final, the BAR will have the possibility to choose the couple, according to their technical criteria, who better danced.

== Scoring chart ==
Couple	Place	01	02	03	04	05	06	07	08	09	10	11	12	13	Semi-finals		Final
Couple	Place	01	02	03	04	05	06	07	08	09	10	11	12	13	01	02	Final
Julián & Sofía M.	1	35	37	14	38	38	25	21	36	24	24	11	5	—^{A}	6		6
Jimena & Mauro	2	23	32	33	28	26	40	28	24	17	20	22	22	—^{A}		6	2
María & Facundo M. (Note: Originally, Facundo Mazzei danced with Florencia Vigna (weeks 1–4).)	3	31	31	37	25	27	29	16	28	32	32	19	16	—^{A}		2	
Micaela & Ignacio	3	23	26	32	33	12	30	30	17	22	21	26	16	—^{A}	2		
Cinthia & Gonzalo	5	34	38	33	31	36	37	2	23	24	15	31	24	—^{A}			
Diego & Lourdes	5	33	28	29	29	29	35	35 (Note: Diego Ramos replaced by Nahuel Leguizamón.)	22	38	16	39	23	—^{A}			
Soledad & Nicolás	7	23	23	19	34	23	31	18	30	17	18	35	12				
María Sol & Damián	8	26	27	14	28	12	15	20	17	29	11	19					
Natalie & Iván	9	26	23	32	28	21	10 (Note: Natalie Weber replaced by Mariela Anchipi.)	33	25	30	15						
Esmeralda & Santiago	10	16	26	23	10	26 (Note: Esmeralda Mitre & Santiago Almaraz replaced by Gladys Jiménez & Santiago Griffo.)	31	17	5	8							
Lucas & Florencia M.	11	29	33	27	10	31	24	19	21								
Gabriel & Rebeca	12	27	— (Note: In round 2, Gabriel Usandivaras could not dance due to injury and was sent to the duel.)	27	31	13	25	9									
Inés & Facundo A.	13	26	24	19	14	18	19										
Flavio & Belén	14	39	40	33	30	29	30										
Benjamín & Camila	15	22	36	19	24	16											
Sofía J. & Maximiliano	16	30	21	30	14												
Marcela & Matías	17	29	22	21	14												
Anamá & Joel	18	13	17	11													
Joaquín & Yamila	19	13	29														
Ezequiel & Bárbara	20	16															
Florencia T. & Conrado	21	22															
Minimum score to be saved		23	23	20	25	17	20	17	22	23	18	23	17	—			

- In italics, partial scores without the secret ballot.

Red numbers indicate the lowest score for each style.
Green numbers indicate the highest score for each style.
Indicates the couple sentenced.
Indicates the couple was saved by the judges.
Indicates the couple was saved by the public.
Indicates the couple eliminated that round.
Indicates the couple withdrew.
Indicates the winning couple.
Indicates the runner-up couple.
Indicates the semi-finalists couples.

Notes:

- A: All couples are sent to duel to define the semifinalists.

=== Highest and lowest scoring performances ===
The best and worst performances in each dance according to the judges' (more the BAR) 41-point scale are as follows:

Dance	Highest scored dancer(s)	Highest score	Lowest scored dancer(s)	Lowest score
Disco	Flavio Mendoza & Belén Pouchán	39	Anamá Ferreira; Joaquín Álvarez	13
Aqua Dance	Flavio Mendoza & Belén Pouchán	40	Anamá Ferreira	17
Trio Salsa	Florencia Vigna & Facundo Mazzei	37	Anamá Ferreira	11
Luis Miguel Songs	Julián Serrano & Sofía Morandi	38	Esmeralda Mitre; Lucas Velasco & Florencia Marcasoli	10
Cuarteto	Julián Serrano & Sofía Morandi	38	María Sol Pérez; Micaela Viciconte	12
Free Style	Jimena Barón	40	Natalie Weber	10
Synchro dance	Diego Ramos & Lourdes Sánchez	35	Cinthia Fernández	2
Cumbia	Julián Serrano & Sofía Morandi	36	Esmeralda Mitre	5
Bachata	Diego Ramos & Lourdes Sánchez	38	Esmeralda Mitre	8
Folklore	María del Cerro & Facundo Mazzei	32	María Sol Pérez	11
Tributes	Diego Ramos & Lourdes Sánchez	39	Julián Serrano & Sofía Morandi	11
Cha-cha-pop	Cinthia Fernández	24	Julián Serrano & Sofía Morandi	5

== Styles, scores and songs ==
=== Round 1: Disco ===
(Note: This round has double elimination.)

- All songs will be sung live by guest singers.

Song and scores
Date	Celebrity(s)	Song	Score				Total
Date	Celebrity(s)	Song	ÁdB	LF	FP	MP	Total
4 September	Jimena Barón	«Super Freak»—Rick James	4	7	8	4	23
4 September	Joaquín Álvarez	«Boogie Wonderland»—Earth, Wind & Fire	2	5	5	0	12(+1) (Note: BAR intervention (add or subtract a point).)= 13
4 September	Sofía Jiménez	«Voulez-Vous»—ABBA	10	8	8	4	30
6 September	Micaela Viciconte	«Never Can Say Goodbye»—Gloria Gaynor	7	6	7	3	23
6 September	Inés Stork	«Celebration»—Kylie Minogue	4	10	9	3	26
6 September	Julián Serrano & Sofía Morandi	«Can't Take My Eyes Off You»—Gloria Gaynor	10	10	10	5	35
7 September	Cinthia Fernández	«Hot Stuff»—Donna Summer	10	9	10 (Note: Replaced by Pampita Ardohaín.)	5	34
7 September	Marcela Baños	«Everlasting Love»—Gloria Estefan	8	8	9	4	29
10 September	Flavio Mendoza & Belén Pouchán	«One Night Only»—from Dreamgirls	8	10	10	10	38(+1)= 39
10 September	Natalie Weber	«Born to Be Alive»—Patrick Hernandez	7	8	7	4	26
11 September	Florencia Vigna & Facundo Mazzei	«I Will Survive»—Gloria Gaynor	8	9	8	6	31
11 September	Esmeralda Mitre	«Mamma Mia»—ABBA	3	3	5	5	16
13 September	Ezequiel Cwirkaluk & Bárbara Silenzi	«Knock on Wood»—Amii Stewart	3	6	7	-1	15(+1)= 16
13 September	Soledad Fandiño	«On the Radio»—Donna Summer	4	7	8	3	22(+1)= 23
13 September	Lucas Velasco & Florencia Marcasoli	«Bad Girls»—Donna Summer	7	8	9	5	29
14 September	María Sol Pérez	«Don't Stop 'Til You Get Enough»—Michael Jackson	4	8	7	7	26
14 September	Anamá Ferreira	«I Am What I Am»—Gloria Gaynor	-1	6	8	-1	12(+1)= 13
14 September	Gabriel Usandivaras & Rebeca Vázquez	«You Should Be Dancing»—Bee Gees	8	6	10	3	27
17 September	Diego Ramos & Lourdes Sánchez	«Last Dance»—Donna Summer	6	9	8	10	33
17 September	Florencia Tesouro	«September»—Earth, Wind & Fire	4	7	6	5	22
17 September	Benjamín Alfonso	«Disco Inferno»—The Trammps	3	8	8	3	22

- Sentenced: Joaquín Álvarez (13), Anamá Ferreira (13), Esmeralda Mitre (16), Ezequiel Cwirkaluk & Bárbara Silenzi (16), Florencia Tesouro (22) and Benjamín Alfonso (22)
- Saved by the judges: Joaquín Álvarez, Anamá Ferreira and Esmeralda Mitre
- Saved by the public: Benjamín Alfonso (38.93%)
- Eliminated: Florencia Tesouro (26.35%) and Ezequiel Cwirkaluk & Bárbara Silenzi (34.72%)

=== Round 2: Aquadance ===
(Note: In this round there was nomination.)

Song and scores
Date	Celebrity(s)	Song	Score				Total
Date	Celebrity(s)	Song	ÁdB	LF	FP	MP	Total
20 September	Flavio Mendoza & Belén Pouchán	«El día que me quieras»—Carlos Gardel	10	10	10	10	40
20 September	Julián Serrano & Sofía Morandi	«...Baby One More Time»—Britney Spears	10	10	10	7	37
21 September	Cinthia Fernández	«He's a Pirate»—Klaus Badelt & Hans Zimmer	10	10	10	8	38
21 September	Inés Stork	«Somewhere Only We Know»—Keane	3	7	8	6	24
21 September	Marcela Baños	«Radioactive»—Imagine Dragons	5	7	7	2	21(+1) (Note: BAR intervention (add or subtract a point).)= 22
24 September	Jimena Barón	«Love Me Like You Do»—Ellie Goulding	7	9	9	7	32
24 September	Sofía Jiménez	«Utai IV: Reawakening»—Steve Aoki feat. Kenji Kawai	3	6	8	4	21
24 September	Natalie Weber	«Walk on Water»—Thirty Seconds to Mars	3	8	7	4	22(+1)= 23
24 September	Lucas Velasco & Florencia Marcasoli	«Brothers in Arms»—Junkie XL	8	10	8	7	33
25 September	Micaela Viciconte	«Hymn for the Weekend»—Coldplay	7	6	6	7	26
25 September	Anamá Ferreira	«Lenda das Sereias»—Marisa Monte	0	6	7	4	17
25 September	Joaquín Álvarez (Note: Nominated. Sent to the telephone duel for not presenting to the duel.)	«Don't Let Me Down»—The Chainsmokers feat. Daya	7	7	8	7	29
27 September	Diego Ramos & Lourdes Sánchez	«Código de Barra»—Bajofondo	7	7	6 (Note: Replaced by Pampita Ardohaín.)	7	27(+1)= 28
27 September	Esmeralda Mitre	«Livin' on a Prayer»—Bon Jovi	5	7	8	6	26
27 September	Gabriel Usandivaras & Rebeca Vázquez	«Believer»—Imagine Dragons	—	—	—	—	—
28 September	Florencia Vigna & Facundo Mazzei	«The Beautiful People»—Marilyn Manson	7	9	10	5	31
28 September	María Sol Pérez	«Bohemian Rhapsody»—Panic! at the Disco	7	8	7	5	27
28 September	Soledad Fandiño	«Crazy in Love (Note: Fifty Shades of Grey version)»—Beyoncé	6	6	8	3	23
28 September	Benjamín Alfonso	«Demons»—Imagine Dragons	10	9	9	8	36

- Sentenced: Gabriel Usandivaras & Rebeca Vázquez (—), Anamá Ferreira (17), Sofía Jiménez (21), Marcela Baños (22) and Joaquín Álvarez (6 votes)
- Saved by the judges: Gabriel Usandivaras & Rebeca Vázquez, Marcela Baños and Sofía Jiménez
- Saved by the public: Anamá Ferreira (51.27%)
- Eliminated: Joaquín Álvarez (48.73%)

=== Round 3: Trio Salsa ===
Song and scores
Date	Celebrity(s) / (Guest)	Song (Note: All the songs were versioned in salsa style.)	Score				Total
Date	Celebrity(s) / (Guest)	Song	ÁdB	LF	FP	MP	Total
2 October	Cinthia Fernández / (Hernán Piquín)	«UpTown Funk!»—Mark Ronson feat. Bruno Mars	6	10	10	7	33
2 October	María Sol Pérez / (Rocío Guirao Díaz)	«Mayores»—Becky G	3	7	4	1	15(-1) (Note: BAR intervention (add or subtract a point).)= 14
2 October	Anamá Ferreira / (Denise Dumas)	«El Amante»—Nicky Jam	0	5	7	-1	11
4 October	Jimena Barón / (Virginia Gallardo)	«Felices los 4»—Maluma	7	9	9	8	33
4 October	Esmeralda Mitre / (Cae)	«Te Recuerdo»—Cae	5	6	7	5	23
4 October	Natalie Weber / (Candela Ruggeri)	«El Perdón»—Nicky Jam & Enrique Iglesias	8	9	9	6	32
4 October	Benjamín Alfonso / (Stéfano de Gregorio)	«Vente Pa' Ca»—Ricky Martin feat. Maluma	3	5	7	4	19
5 October	Flavio Mendoza & Belén Pouchán / (María Vázquez)	«Quimbara» / «Bemba Colora»—Jennifer Lopez	6	10 (Note: Replaced by Pampita Ardohaín.)	9 (Note: Replaced by Nacha Guevara.)	8	33
5 October	Inés Stork / (Laura Fernández)	«Súbeme la Radio»—Enrique Iglesias	5	7	5	3	20(-1)= 19
5 October	Lucas Velasco & Florencia Marcasoli / (Stefanía Roitman)	«Échame la Culpa»—Luis Fonsi & Demi Lovato	5	8	7	7	27
5 October	Sofía Jiménez / (María del Cerro)	«Sin Pijama»—Becky G & Natti Natasha	8	7	7	8	30
8 October	Florencia Vigna & Facundo Mazzei / (Felipe Colombo)	«Chantaje»—Shakira feat. Maluma	9	10	10	8	37
8 October	Micaela Viciconte / (Dan Breitman)	«Shape of You»—Ed Sheeran	8	7	9	7	31(+1)= 32
8 October	Julián Serrano & Sofía Morandi / (Jey Mammón)	«Será Que No Me Amas»—Luis Miguel	4	5	6	-1	14
8 October	Marcela Baños / (Noelia Martínez)	«Suave»—Luis Miguel	3	8	7	3	21
9 October	Diego Ramos & Lourdes Sánchez / (Florencia Peña)	«Sorry»—Justin Bieber	9	9	0	10	28(+1)= 29
9 October	Gabriel Usandivaras & Rebeca Vázquez / (Yanina Latorre)	«Havana»—Camila Cabello	6	7	7	7	27
9 October	Soledad Fandiño / (Fernando Dente)	«Despacito»—Luis Fonsi feat. Daddy Yankee	5	6	6	2	19

- Sentenced: Anamá Ferreira (11), María Sol Pérez (14), Julián Serrano & Sofía Morandi (14), Benjamín Alfonso (19), Inés Banquer (19) and Soledad Fandiño (19)
- Saved by the judges: Julián Serrano & Sofía Morandi, Inés Banquer, María Sol Pérez and Soledad Fandiño
- Saved by the public: Benjamín Alfonso (63.38%)
- Eliminated: Anamá Ferreira (36.62%)

=== Round 4: Luis Miguel's songs ===
(Note: This round has double elimination.)

Song and scores
Date	Celebrity(s)		Song	Score				Total
Date	Celebrity(s)		Song	ÁdB	LF	FP	MP	Total
12 October	Jimena Barón		«La Chica Del Bikini Azul»	6	8	7	7	28
12 October	Cinthia Fernández		«Será Que No Me Amas»	4	9	9	8	30(+1) (Note: BAR intervention (add or subtract a point).)= 31
12 October	Micaela Viciconte		«Cómo Es Posible Que a Mi Lado»	10	9	8	6	33
12 October	Marcela Baños		«Dame»	3	5	7	-1	14
12 October	Lucas Velasco & Florencia Marcasoli		«Culpable O No»	3	3	4	0	10
15 October	Flavio Mendoza & Belén Pouchán		«No Sé Tú»	4	9	9	8	30
15 October	Esmeralda Mitre		«Ahora Te Puedes Marchar»	3	4	5	-1	11(-1)= 10
15 October	Sofía Jiménez		«Que Nivel de Mujer»	2	6	5	2	15(-1)= 14
15 October	Benjamín Alfonso		«Alguien Como Tú»	7	8	7	2	24
16 October	Florencia Vigna	Facundo Mazzei	«Tengo Todo Excepto a Ti»	9	7	7	2	25
16 October	Soledad Fandiño		«Amarte Es un Placer» / «Inolvidable»	10	8	7	8	33(+1)= 34
16 October	Inés Banquer		«Bésame Mucho»	2	6	6	-1	13(+1)= 14
18 October	Diego Ramos & Lourdes Sánchez		«La Incondicional»	5	8	8	8	29
18 October	María Sol Pérez		«Suave»	3	7	10	7	27(+1)= 28
18 October	Julián Serrano & Sofía Morandi		«Cuando Calienta el Sol»	10	10	10	8	38
18 October	Natalie Weber		«Fría Como el Viento»	8	8	7	5	28
18 October	Gabriel Usandivaras & Rebeca Vázquez		«Entrégate»	8	9	9	6	32(-1)= 31

- Sentenced: Florencia Marcasoli & Lucas Velasco (10), Esmeralda Mitre (10), Inés Banquer (14), Sofía Jiménez (14), Marcela Baños (14) and Benjamín Alfonso (24)
- Saved by the judges: Florencia Marcasoli & Lucas Velasco, Benjamín Alfonso and Esmeralda Mitre
- Saved by the public: Inés Banquer (42.11%)
- Eliminated: Marcela Baños (18.29%) and Sofía Jiménez (39.60%)
- Withdrew: Florencia Vigna

=== Round 5: Cuarteto ===
Song and scores
Date	Celebrity(s)	Song	Score				Total
Date	Celebrity(s)	Song	ÁdB	LF	FP	MP	Total
22 October	Jimena Barón	«Cómo Olvidarla»—Rodrigo	3	7	6	10	26
22 October	Micaela Viciconte	«Yo No Te Pido La Luna»—La K'onga	3	5	2	1	11(+1) (Note: BAR intervention (add or subtract a point).)= 12
22 October	Cinthia Fernández	«Como Le Digo»—Rodrigo	9	9	10	8	36
23 October	Flavio Mendoza & Belén Pouchán	«Por Lo Que Yo Te Quiero»—Walter Olmos	7	8	9	10	34
23 October	Soledad Fandiño	«Soy Un Adicto A Ti»—Walter Olmos	6	4	6	7	23
23 October	Julián Serrano & Sofía Morandi	«Soy Cordobés»—Rodrigo	10	10	10	8	38
23 October	Gabriel Usandivaras & Rebeca Vázquez	«Amor De Alquiler»—Rodrigo	2	5	5	1	13
25 October	Diego Ramos & Lourdes Sánchez	«Qué Bonito»—Banda XXI	6	8	9	6	29
25 October	María Sol Pérez	«Qué Ironía»—Rodrigo	3	3	4	3	13(-1)= 12
25 October	Natalie Weber	«Ahora Mírame»—Ulises Bueno	4	8	7	2	21
25 October	Benjamín Alfonso	«Fue Lo Mejor Del Amor»—Rodrigo	3	6	4	3	16
26 October	Inés Stork	«Ya Me Enteré»—La K'onga	3	7	7 (Note: Replaced by Nacha Guevara.)	2	19(-1)= 18
26 October	María del Cerro & Facundo Mazzei	«Fuego y Pasión»—Rodrigo	4	8	7	8	27
26 October	Gladys Jiménez & Santiago Griffo (Note: Replacement for Esmeralda Mitre & Santiago Almaraz.)	«Ocho Cuarenta»—Rodrigo	10	2	5	10	27(-1)= 26
29 October	Lucas Velasco & Florencia Marcasoli	«No Me Mientas»—Walter Olmos	7	8	8	8	31

- Sentenced: María Sol Pérez (12), Micaela Viciconte (12), Gabriel Usandivaras & Rebeca Vázquez (13) and Benjamín Alfonso (16)
- Saved by the judges: Gabriel Usandivaras & Rebeca Vázquez and María Sol Pérez
- Saved by the public: Micaela Viciconte (62.03%)
- Eliminated: Benjamín Alfonso (37.97%)

=== Round 6: Free Style ===
Song and scores
Date	Celebrity(s)	Theme	Song	Score				Total
Date	Celebrity(s)	Theme	Song	ADB	LF	FP	MP	Total
30 October	Flavio Mendoza & Belén Pouchán	Circus and the family	«Never Enough» / «The Greatest Show»—from; The Greatest Showman	10	— (Note: Because they left the contest before the sentence, the secret vote was not announced.)	10	10	30
30 October	Micaela Viciconte	Color	«Titans»—Razihel & Aero Chord «Level Up»—Ciara	8	6	7	8	29(+1) (Note: BAR intervention (add or subtract a point).)= 30
30 October	Julián Serrano & Sofía Morandi	Serrandix (Mix series)	«Stranger Things Theme»—Kyle Dixon & Michael Stein «The Walking Dead (Main Theme)»—Bear McCreary «Thriller»—Michael Jackson «Bella ciao»—Naestro feat. Maître Gims, Vitaa, Dadju & Slimane	3	10	10	1	24(+1)= 25
1 November	Jimena Barón	Woman (Feminism)	«The Untold»—Secession Studios	10	10	10	10	40
1 November	Soledad Fandiño	The lady at the bar	«This Business of Love»—Penn Counterparts «BOOM»—Tiësto & Sevenn	6	8	9	8	31
1 November	Natalie Weber (Note: Natalie Weber replaced by Mariela Anchipi, in the duel.)	Dark passion (Tribute to Michael Jackson)	«In the Closet» / «Dangerous» / «Remember the Time»—Michael Jackson (Note: In the duel, the performed song was G.U.Y. of Lady Gaga.)	3	2	4	1	10
1 November	Gabriel Usandivaras & Rebeca Vázquez	Diversity	«Sexual Revolution»—Macy Gray «(I Can't Get No) Satisfaction»—Britney Spears «It's Not Right but It's Okay»—Whitney Houston (Note: This song was danced in the version Thunderpuss 2000 Club Mix.)	5	7	8	5	25
2 November	María del Cerro & Facundo Mazzei	The Pop Divas	«Havana»—Camila Cabello (Note: Sung live (in Spanish) by Facundo Mazzei, along with the band Vox Pop.) «Toxic»—Britney Spears «7/11»—Beyoncé «New Rules»—Dua Lipa (Note: This song was danced in the version Alison Wonderland remix.)	4	9	8	8	29
2 November	Inés Stork	Fulfilling dreams	«Montserrat»—Orquesta del Plata «Santa María (del Buen Ayre)»—Gotan Project «The Vampire Masquerade»—Peter Gundry «Sway»—The Pussycat Dolls	3	8	6	1	18(+1)= 19
2 November	María Sol Pérez	Go Forward	«Survivor»—2WEI «Matador»—Marnik & Miami Blue feat. Marano	4	4	5	3	16(-1)= 15
5 November	Diego Ramos & Lourdes Sánchez	La La Land	«City of Stars» / «Another Day of Sun»—from La La Land	7	10	9	8	34(+1)= 35
5 November	Cinthia Fernández	It was not a dream (Inspired by It)	«Turn Down for What»—DJ Snake and Lil Jon «First of the Year (Equinox)»—Skrillex	10	9	10	8	37
5 November	Esmeralda Mitre	In my dreams (1980s)	«Into the Groove»—Madonna «Girls Just Want to Have Fun» / «True Colors» / «Time After Time»—Cyndi Lauper	10	6	8	7	31
6 November	Lucas Velasco & Florencia Marcasoli	Inspiration (Muses)	«Freak»—Estelle feat. Kardinal Offishall «Goin' In»—Jennifer Lopez feat. Flo Rida «I Don't Like You»—Eva Simons	5	7	7	5	24

- Sentenced: Natalie Weber (10), María Sol Pérez (15) and Inés Storck Banquer (19)
- Saved by the judges: María Sol Pérez
- Saved by the public: Mariela Anchipi (replacing Natalie Weber) (50.19%)
- Eliminated: Inés Stork (49.81%)
- Withdrew: Flavio Mendoza & Belén Pouchán

=== Round 7: Synchro dance ===
Song and scores
Date	Celebrity(s)	Song	Score				Total
Date	Celebrity(s)	Song	ADB	LF	FP	MP	Total
8 November	Jimena Barón	«Dem Beats»—Todrick Hall feat. RuPaul	6	8	8	7	29(-1) (Note: BAR intervention (add or subtract a point).)= 28
8 November	Julián Serrano & Sofía Morandi	«Idol»—BTS	3	8	6	5	22(-1)= 21
8 November	Gabriel Usandivaras & Rebeca Vázquez	«I Like It»—Cardi B, Bad Bunny & J Balvin	4	3	3	0	10(-1)= 9
8 November	Lucas Velasco & Florencia Marcasoli	«El Anillo»—Jennifer Lopez feat. Ozuna	3	6	7	4	20(-1)= 19
9 November	Lourdes Sánchez & Nahuel Leguizamón (Note: Replacement for Diego Ramos.)	«Swish Swish»—Katy Perry feat. Nicki Minaj	10	9	9	8	36(-1)= 35
9 November	María del Cerro & Facundo Mazzei	«In My Feelings»—Drake	2	6	5	3	16
9 November	Micaela Viciconte	«Finesse»—Bruno Mars feat. Cardi B	8	7	8	8	31(-1)= 30
9 November	Cinthia Fernández	«Swalla»—Jason Derulo feat. Nicki Minaj & Ty Dolla $ign	0	1	2	-1	2
9 November	Soledad Fandiño	«Look What You Made Me Do»—Taylor Swift	4	5	5	5	19(-1)= 18
12 November	Esmeralda Mitre	«Scooby Doo Pa Pa»—Dj Kass	2	5	5	5	17
12 November	María Sol Pérez	«Machika»—J Balvin, Jeon & Anitta	0	7	7	7	21(-1)= 20
12 November	Mariela Anchipi (Note: Replacement for Natalie Weber.)	«1, 2, 3»—Sofía Reyes feat. Jason Derulo and De La Ghetto	10	6	8	10	34(-1)= 33

- Sentenced: Cinthia Fernández (2), Gabriel Usandivaras & Rebeca Vázquez (9) and María del Cerro & Facundo Mazzei (16)
- Saved by the judges: Cinthia Fernández
- Saved by the public: María del Cerro & Facundo Mazzei (72.06%)
- Eliminated: Gabriel Usandivaras & Rebeca Vázquez (27.94%)

=== Round 8: Cumbia ===
Song and scores
Date	Celebrity(s)	Song	Score				Total
Date	Celebrity(s)	Song	ADB	LF	FP	MP	Total
15 November	Jimena Barón	«Una Cerveza»—Ráfaga	4	8	7	5	24
15 November	Micaela Viciconte	«Locuras Contigo»—Rombai	3	4	5	6	18(-1) (Note: BAR intervention (add or subtract a point).)= 17
15 November	Cinthia Fernández	«Márchate Ahora»—Los Totora	2	6	6	10	24(-1)= 23
15 November	Lucas Velasco & Florencia Marcasoli	«Me Niego»—Modo Avión	4	5	6	5	20(+1)= 21
16 November	Diego Ramos & Lourdes Sánchez	«Amores Como El Nuestro»—Los Charros	5	7	7 (Note: Replaced by Pampita Ardohaín.)	2	21(+1)= 22
16 November	María Sol Pérez	«Nena»—Márama	2	6	6	4	18(-1)= 17
16 November	Soledad Fandiño	«Llámame Más Temprano»—Mano Arriba	6	8	9	7	30
19 November	María del Cerro & Facundo Mazzei	«No Te Creas Tan Importante»—Damas Gratis feat. Viru Kumbieron	5	7	8	8	28
19 November	Esmeralda Mitre	«Se Me Ha Perdido Un Corazon»—Gilda	0	2	4	0	6(-1)= 5
19 November	Julián Serrano & Sofía Morandi	«Bailan Rochas y Chetas»—Nene Malo	10	9	10	7	36
19 November	Natalie Weber	«Fuera»—Karina "La Princesita"	7	8	7	2	24(+1)= 25

- Sentenced: Esmeralda Mitre (5), Micaela Viciconte (17), María Sol Pérez (17) and Lucas Velasco & Florencia Marcasoli (21)
- Saved by the judges: María Sol Pérez and Micaela Viciconte
- Saved by the public: Esmeralda Mitre (53.81%)
- Eliminated: Lucas Velasco & Florencia Marcasoli (46.19%)

=== Round 9: Bachata ===
Song and scores
Date	Celebrity(s)	Song	Score				Total
Date	Celebrity(s)	Song	ADB	LF	FP	MP	Total
22 November	Jimena Barón	«Sobredosis»—Romeo Santos feat. Ozuna	4	4	6	3	17
22 November	Micaela Viciconte	«Te Robaré»—Prince Royce	6	6	6	3	21(+1) (Note: BAR intervention (add or subtract a point).)= 22
23 November	Diego Ramos & Lourdes Sánchez	«Propuesta Indecente»—Romeo Santos	10	10	10 (Note: Replaced by Pampita Ardohaín.)	8	38
23 November	María Sol Pérez	«Eres Mía»—Romeo Santos	5	8	9	7	29
23 November	Cinthia Fernández	«Traicionera»—Grupo Extra	5	7	8	4	24
23 November	Natalie Weber	«Te Perdiste Mi Amor»—Thalía feat. Prince Royce	6	10	7	6	29(+1)= 30
26 November	María del Cerro & Facundo Mazzei	«Darte un Beso»—Prince Royce	7	9	8	8	32
26 November	Esmeralda Mitre	«Cancioncitas de Amor»—Romeo Santos	2	3	4	0	9(-1)= 8
26 November	Soledad Fandiño	«Deja Vu»—Prince Royce & Shakira	3	6	5	3	17
26 November	Julián Serrano & Sofía Morandi	«We Don't Talk Anymore»—Charlie Puth feat. Selena Gomez (Note: This song was danced in the version Bachata.)	3	6	8	6	23(+1)= 24

- Sentenced: Esmeralda Mitre (8), Jimena Barón (17), Soledad Fandiño (17) and Micaela Viciconte (22)
- Saved by the judges: Jimena Barón and Micaela Viciconte
- Saved by the public: Soledad Fandiño (65.56%)
- Eliminated: Esmeralda Mitre (34.44%)

=== Round 10: Folklore ===
Song and scores
Date	Celebrity(s)	Song	Score				Total
Date	Celebrity(s)	Song	ADB	LF	FP	MP	Total
29 November	Diego Ramos & Lourdes Sánchez	«Chacarera Del Rancho»—Los Nocheros	4	7	5	0	16
29 November	María Sol Pérez	«La Sin Corazón»—Chaqueño Palavecino	4	3	4	0	11
29 November	Julián Serrano & Sofía Morandi	«Chacarera De Un Triste»—Soledad Pastorutti	7	8	9	0	24
30 November	Jimena Barón	«Entre A Mi Pago Sin Golpear»—Soledad Pastorutti	4	6	6	4	20
30 November	María del Cerro & Facundo Mazzei	«Juan De La Calle»—Chaqueño Palavecino	7	8	10	7	32
30 November	Micaela Viciconte	«Chacarera Del Olvido»—Jorge Rojas	6	5	5	4	20(+1) (Note: BAR intervention (add or subtract a point).)= 21
3 December	Soledad Fandiño	«Chacarera Del Violín»—Néstor Garnica	5	5	6	3	19(-1)= 18
3 December	Cinthia Fernández	«Huayra Muyoj»—Néstor Garnica (Note: In the duel, the performed song was La Yapa of Los Nocheros.)	3	8	5	0	16(-1)= 15
3 December	Natalie Weber	«Zamba Para Olvidar»—Daniel Toro	5	3	5	3	16(-1)= 15

- Sentenced: María Sol Pérez (11), Cinthia Fernández (15), Natalie Weber (15) and Diego Ramos & Lourdes Sánchez (16)
- Saved by the judges: Cinthia Fernández and Diego Ramos & Lourdes Sánchez
- Saved by the public: María Sol Pérez (51.38%)
- Eliminated: Natalie Weber (48.62%)

=== Round 11: Tributes ===
Song and scores
Date	Celebrity(s)	Tribute	Song	Score				Total
Date	Celebrity(s)	Tribute	Song	ADB	LF	FP	MP	Total
4 December	Julián Serrano & Sofía Morandi	Pixar	«Infinity and Beyond» / «You've Got a Friend in Me» / «Monsters, Inc. Theme»—Randy Newman «Incredits 2»—Michael Giacchino «Un Poco Loco (Note: Sung by Sofía Morandi.)»—Gael García Bernal & Anthony Gonzalez	2	5	4	0	11
6 December	Jimena Barón	Aretha Franklin	«I Say a Little Prayer (Note: Jimena Barón singing at the beginning of the performance.)» / «R.E.S.P.E.C.T» / «Think (Note: Sung live by choir Minadar Gospel.)»—Aretha Franklin	4	8	8	2	22
6 December	Micaela Viciconte	Ricardo Fort	«Tengo (Note: This song was danced in the version Jerome Farley & Del Pino Bros Remix.)» / «A Mi Manera»—Ricardo Fort «Bad Romance»—Halestorm «I Know You Want Me (Calle Ocho)»—Pitbull	4	8	7	7	26
6 December	Cinthia Fernández	Fighters of Falkland Islands	«Sobreviviendo»—La Beriso feat. Victor Heredia «Himno Nacional Argentino (Note: Sung live by Evangelina Rebozio.)»—Vicente López y Planes & Blas Parera	4	10	10	7	31
6 December	Soledad Fandiño	Indigenous (Ita Poty Miri Community)	«Apocalíptico»—Residente «Cuando los Pies Besan el Piso»—Calle 13 «Latinoamérica»—Calle 13 feat. Susana Baca, Totó la Momposina & Maria Rita	5	10	10	10	35
7 December	Diego Ramos & Lourdes Sánchez	Freddie Mercury	«Bohemian Rhapsody» / «I Want to Break Free» / «Don't Stop Me Now» / «Under Pressure» / «Love of My Life» / «Radio Ga Ga»—Queen	10	10	10	9	39
7 December	María del Cerro & Facundo Mazzei	Mirtha Legrand	«La Viudita»—Mirtha Legrand «Almorzando con Mirtha Legrand» / «Mirtha Ya Llegó» / «Emperatriz»—Luis María Serra «Rosa María»—Chambao	3	6	6	4	19
7 December	María Sol Pérez (Note: Sent to the telephone duel for not presenting to the duel.)	Frida Kahlo	«Despedida»—Shakira «The Floating Bed»—Elliot Goldenthal	3	6	5	4	18(+1) (Note: BAR intervention (add or subtract a point).)= 19

- Sentenced: Julián Serrano & Sofía Morandi (11), María del Cerro & Facundo Mazzei (19), María Sol Pérez (19) and Jimena Barón (22)
- Saved by the judges: Jimena Barón and Julián Serrano & Sofía Morandi
- Saved by the public: María del Cerro & Facundo Mazzei (68.77%)
- Eliminated: María Sol Pérez (31.23%)

=== Round 12: Cha-cha-pop ===
Song and scores
Date	Celebrity(s)	Song	Score				Total
Date	Celebrity(s)	Song	ADB	LF	FP	MP	Total
10 December	Micaela Viciconte	«Havana»—Camila Cabello feat. Young Thug	4	2	5	4	15(+1) (Note: BAR intervention (add or subtract a point).)= 16
10 December	Soledad Fandiño	«Besarte Mucho»—Lali Espósito	0	4	4	4	12
11 December	Jimena Barón	«Everybody»—Martin Solveig	5	8	6	4	23(-1)= 22
11 December	Diego Ramos & Lourdes Sánchez	«There's Nothing Holdin' Me Back»—Shawn Mendes	3	7	7	6	23
11 December	Cinthia Fernández	«Bang Bang»—Jessie J, Ariana Grande & Nicki Minaj	5	7	7	5	24
11 December	Julián Serrano & Sofía Morandi	«This Is What You Came For»—Calvin Harris feat. Rihanna	1	2	3	-1	5
13 December	María del Cerro & Facundo Mazzei (Note: Sent to the telephone duel by not being able to finish their choreography in the duel.)	«Burnin' Up»—Jessie J feat. 2 Chainz	3	5	4	4	16

- Sentenced: Julián Serrano & Sofía Morandi (5), Soledad Fandiño (12), Micaela Viciconte (16) and María del Cerro & Facundo Mazzei (16)
- Saved by the judges: Julián Serrano & Sofía Morandi and Micaela Viciconte
- Saved by the public: María del Cerro & Facundo Mazzei (67.88%)
- Eliminated: Soledad Fandiño (32.12%)

=== Round 13: Tango ===
(Note: This round has double elimination.)

Song and scores
Date	Celebrity(s)	Song	Result
14 December	Jimena Barón	«Código de Barra»—Bajofondo	Advanced to the Semi-finals
14 December	Diego Ramos & Lourdes Sánchez	«La Cumparsita»—Forever Tango	Eliminated (Note: The percentage obtained, by the public, of Cinthia Fernández and Diego Ramos & Lourdes Sánchez is not known.)
14 December	Micaela Viciconte	«Tanguera»—Mariano Mores	Advanced to the Semi-finals
14 December	Julián Serrano & Sofía Morandi	«Milongueando En El '40»—Forever Tango	Advanced to the Semi-finals
14 December	Cinthia Fernández	«Libertango»—Forever Tango	Eliminated
14 December	María del Cerro & Facundo Mazzei	«Verano Porteño»—Ástor Piazzolla	Advanced to the Semi-finals

Key

- Saved by the judges Saved by the public

Order of salvation

- First semifinalist couple: Jimena Barón
- Second semifinalist couple: Micaela Viciconte (30.36%)
- Third semifinalist couple: Julián Serrano & Sofía Morandi
- Fourth semifinalist couple: María del Cerro & Facundo Mazzei (27.32%)
- Eliminated: Cinthia Fernández and Diego Ramos & Lourdes Sánchez

=== Semifinals ===
==== 1^{st} Semi-final ====
Song and scores
Date	Celebrity(s)	Style	Song	Score					Total
Date	Celebrity(s)	Style	Song	ADB	LF	FP	MP	BAR	Total
First semifinal (17 December)	Micaela Viciconte	Cumbia	«Locuras Contigo»—Rombai						0
First semifinal (17 December)	Julián Serrano & Sofía Morandi	Cumbia	«Bailan Rochas y Chetas»—Nene Malo						1
First semifinal (17 December)	Micaela Viciconte	Bachata	«Te Robaré»—Prince Royce						1
First semifinal (17 December)	Julián Serrano & Sofía Morandi	Bachata	«We Don't Talk Anymore»—Charlie Puth feat. Selena Gomez (Note: This song was danced in the version Bachata Remix by DJ Tronky.)						0
First semifinal (17 December)	Micaela Viciconte	Folklore	«Chacarera Del Olvido»—Jorge Rojas						0
First semifinal (17 December)	Julián Serrano & Sofía Morandi	Folklore	«Chacarera De Un Triste»—Soledad Pastorutti						1
First semifinal (17 December)	Micaela Viciconte	Luis Miguel; Songs	«Cómo Es Posible Que a Mi Lado»						1
First semifinal (17 December)	Julián Serrano & Sofía Morandi	Luis Miguel; Songs	«Cuando Calienta el Sol»						0

Totals
Celebrity(s)	Subtotal	Telephone vote	Total
Micaela Viciconte	2	42.02% (0)	2
Julián Serrano & Sofía Morandi	2	57.98% (4)	6

Notes

- : The point is for the couple.
- : The point is not for the couple.

Result

- Finalists: Julián Serrano & Sofía Morandi
- Semifinalist: Micaela Viciconte

==== 2^{nd} Semifinal ====
Song and scores
Date	Celebrity(s)	Style	Song	Score					Total
Date	Celebrity(s)	Style	Song	ADB	LF	FP	MP	BAR	Total
Second semifinal (18 December)	María del Cerro & Facundo Mazzei	Cuarteto	«Fuego y Pasión»—Rodrigo						1
Second semifinal (18 December)	Jimena Barón	Cuarteto	«Cómo Olvidarla»—Rodrigo						0
Second semifinal (18 December)	María del Cerro & Facundo Mazzei	Bachata	«Darte un Beso»—Prince Royce						0
Second semifinal (18 December)	Jimena Barón	Bachata	«Sobredosis»—Romeo Santos feat. Ozuna						1
Second semifinal (18 December)	María del Cerro & Facundo Mazzei	Folklore	«Juan De La Calle»—Chaqueño Palavecino						1
Second semifinal (18 December)	Jimena Barón	Folklore	«Entre A Mi Pago Sin Golpear»—Soledad Pastorutti						0
Second semifinal (18 December)	María del Cerro & Facundo Mazzei	Luis Miguel; Songs	«Tengo Todo Excepto a Ti»						0
Second semifinal (18 December)	Jimena Barón	Luis Miguel; Songs	«La Chica Del Bikini Azul»						1

Totals
Celebrity(s)	Subtotal	Telephone vote	Total
María del Cerro & Facundo Mazzei	2	41.58% (0)	2
Jimena Barón	2	58.42% (4)	6

Notes

- : The point is for the couple.
- : The point is not for the couple.

Result

- Finalist: Jimena Barón
- Semifinalists: María del Cerro & Facundo Mazzei

=== Final ===
Song and scores
Date	Celebrity(s)	Style	Song	Score					Total
Date	Celebrity(s)	Style	Song	ADB	LF	FP	MP	BAR	Total
Final (20 December)	Julián Serrano & Sofía Morandi	Disco	«Can't Take My Eyes Off You»—Gloria Gaynor						1
Final (20 December)	Jimena Barón	Disco	«Super Freak»—Rick James						0
Final (20 December)	Julián Serrano & Sofía Morandi	Cha-cha-pop	«This Is What You Came For»—Calvin Harris feat. Rihanna						0
Final (20 December)	Jimena Barón	Cha-cha-pop	«Everybody»—Martin Solveig						1
Final (20 December)	Julián Serrano & Sofía Morandi	Tango	«Milongueando En El '40»—Forever Tango						1
Final (20 December)	Jimena Barón	Tango	«Código de Barra»—Bajofondo						0
Final (20 December)	Julián Serrano & Sofía Morandi (Nicolás Merlín)	Trio Salsa (Note: with your choreographer.)	«Será Que No Me Amas»—Luis Miguel						0
Final (20 December)	Jimena Barón (Matías Napp)	Trio Salsa	«Felices los 4»—Maluma						1

Totals
Celebrity(s)	Subtotal	Telephone vote	Total
Jimena Barón	2	49.14% (0)	2
Julián Serrano & Sofía Morandi	2	50.86% (4)	6

Notes

- : The point is for the couple.
- : The point is not for the couple.

Result:

- Winners: Julián Serrano & Sofía Morandi
- Runner-up: Jimena Barón

== Nominations ==
In week 2, participants were given the opportunity to nominate one of the couples. This nomination occurred after the secret ballot was known. The participants already sentenced, by the vote of the judges, could not be nominated.

Celebrity	2	
Celebrity	Nominate to	Total
Anamá	Esmeralda	—
Benjamín	Soledad	—
Cinthia	Joaquín	—
Diego & Lourdes	Inés	1
Esmeralda	María Sol	1
Flavio & Belén	Joaquín	1
Florencia V. & Facundo	Natalie	—
Florencia M. & Lucas	Inés	—
Gabriel & Rebeca	Diego & Lourdes	—
Inés	Joaquín	4
Jimena	Soledad	—
Julián & Sofía M.	Joaquín	—
Joaquín	Inés	6
Marcela	Joaquín	—
María Sol	Natalie	1
Micaela	Inés	—
Natalie	Joaquín	4
Sofía J.	Flavio & Belén	—
Soledad	Natalie	2

Sentenced
Nominated
