= Loperfido =

Loperfido or Lopérfido is a surname. Notable people with these surnames include:

- Darío Lopérfido (1964–2026), Argentine politician, cultural promoter and journalist
- Emanuele Loperfido (born 1975), Italian politician
- Joey Loperfido (born 1999), American baseball player
