= Bailando 2017 =

- Season 12
- Presented by: Marcelo Tinelli

Release
- Original network: El Trece
- Original release: May 29 – December 18, 2017

Season chronology
- ← Previous; Bailando 2016 Next → Bailando 2018

Bailando 2017 is the twelfth season of Bailando por un Sueño. The season premiere aired on May 29, 2017, on El Trece. Although, the competition started the next day (May 30). Marcelo Tinelli returns as the host of the show's.

On December 18, 2017, actress & reality TV star Florencia Vigna and professional dancer Gonzalo Gerber were announced winners, marking the second win for Vigna. In second place was Federico Bal and Laura Fernández.

== Cast ==
=== Teams ===
Initially, 27 teams were confirmed. This season 8 couples made up of celebrities participate, they are: Alejandro Müller & Roxana Cravero; Federico Bal & Laura Fernández; Gastón Soffritti & Agustina Agazzani; José María Muscari & Noelia Marzol; José Ottavis & Bárbara Silenzi; Lourdes Sánchez & Gabriel Usandivaras; Pedro Alfonso & Florencia Vigna (winners of the previous edition, defenders of the title) and Rocío Guirao Díaz & Nicolas Paladini.

For the second time in the history of Bailando, a celebrity (politician José Ottavis) was disqualified, the reason for his expulsion was the breach of contract. Santiago Griffo enters his place.

Throughout the competition, contestants withdrew from the competition: Pedro Alfonso, Naiara Awada, Gastón Soffritti & Agustina Agazzani and Rocío Guirao Díaz & Nicolas Paladini. In the case of Alfonso and Awanda they had replacement (Agustín Casanova and Micaela Viciconte, respectively). In the case of the couples made up of celebrities (Soffritti & Agazzani and Guirao Díaz & Paladini) they were not replaced. Later, Casanova, Pedro Alfonso's replacement, also retired.

After the resignations of Pedro Alfonso and Agustín Casanova, Florencia Vigna changed teams twice. Finally, she danced alongside dancer Gonzalo Gerber (Casanova's replacement). In the latter instance, she became the only celebrity on the team.

For the first time in the show's history, two non-famous contestants participated: Beatriz Prandi and Consuelo Peppino. The idea of featuring a non-famous male contestant was also raised, but ultimately did not happen.

Celebrity(-ies)	Professional partner	Choreographer	Status	Ref.
José Ottavis (Note: José Ottavis was disqualified by decision of the production, for not complying with the program's regulations.) (Politician) Bárbara «Barby» Silenzi (Note: Bárbara Silenzi was not disqualified and continues with Santiago Griffo, from the second round.) (Dancer & TV personality)		Leandro Gazzia	Disqualified on June 6, 2017	
La Tigresa del Oriente (Singer)	Iván Anrriquez	Melina Greco	Eliminated 1st on June 15, 2017	
Marielys «Mimi» Alvarado (Journalist & panelist)	Maximiliano D'iorio	Bárbara Majule	Eliminated 2nd on June 29, 2017	
Pedro Alfonso (Note: Withdrew for personal and work reasons. His place was taken by the singer Agustín Casanova.) (Theatre producer & actor)			Withdrew on July 17, 2017	
Beatriz Prandi (Non-famous contestant. Housewife)	Yuslandi Ortega	Natalia Mezzavilla	Eliminated 3rd on July 17, 2017	
Alejandro Müller (Actor) Roxana Cravero (Model)		Leandro Delpiero	Eliminated 4th on August 4, 2017	
David «El Dipy» Martínez (Singer)	Rocío Pardo	Bárbara Reali	Eliminated 5th on August 18, 2017	
José María Muscari (Theatre director, playwright & actor) Noelia Marzol (Actress & dancer)		Alejandro Lavallén	Eliminated 6th on September 4, 2017	
Christian Sancho (Model & actor)	Nina Iraolagoitia	Antonella Campaniello	Eliminated 7th on September 23, 2017	
Naiara Awada (Note: Withdrew for health reasons. In its place, enters Micaela Viciconte.) (Actress)			Withdrew on September 25, 2017	
Gastón Soffritti (Note: Withdrew for personal reasons.) (Actor) Agustina Agazzani (Model)		Hernán Alegre	Withdrew on September 27, 2017	
Silvina Luna (Actress, vedette & model)	Juan Leandro Nimo	Daiu Farji	Eliminated 8th on October 9, 2017	
Freddy Villarreal (Comedian, impressionist & actor)	Soledad Bayona	Georgina Tirotta	Eliminated 9th on October 9, 2017	
Yanina Latorre (Panelist & TV personality)	Carlos Bernal	Verónica Paschiero	Eliminated 10th on October 23, 2017	
Rocío Guirao Díaz (Model) Nicolas Paladini (Businessman)		Nazarena Amaya	Withdrew on October 26, 2017	
Cecilia «Chechu» Bonelli (Model & TV host)	Facundo Insúa	Paola García	Eliminated 11th on November 2, 2017	
Nancy Pazos (Journalist & panelist)	Cristián Ponce	Joel Ledesma (Note: Mariela Peña was originally the couple's choreographer. He withdrew from the competition in round 9.)	Eliminated 12th on November 2, 2017	
Agustín Casanova (Note: Withdrew for personal reasons. In Casanova's place, the professional dancer Gonzalo Gerber entered. Vigna becoming the only celebrity within the team.) (Singer)			Withdrew on November 6, 2017	
Ezequiel «El Polaco» Cwirkaluk (Singer)	Solange Báez (Note: Chiara Mea was originally Ezequiel Cwirkaluk's professional partner. However, Cwirkaluk did not have a good deal with her. Therefore, in round 3 there was a partner change.)	Enrique Pérez	Eliminated 13th on November 13, 2017	
Santiago «Tyago» Griffo (Singer) Bárbara «Barby» Silenzi (Dancer & TV personality)		Nicolás Merlín	Eliminated 14th on November 13, 2017	
Consuelo Peppino (Non-famous contestant. Housewife)	Agustín Reyero	Florencia Tisera	Eliminated 15th on November 24, 2017	
Mariela «La Chipi» Anchipi (Dancer, model & choreographer)	Mauro Caiazza	Georgina Tirotta (Note: Matías Ramos was originally the couple's choreographer. He withdrew from the competition in round 11.)	Eliminated 16th on December 5, 2017	
Jey Mammón (Actor, comedian & musician)	Laura Oliva	Verónica Pécollo	Eliminated 17th on December 5, 2017	
Gladys «La bomba tucumana» Jiménez (Singer)	Facundo Arrigoni	Sabrina Sansone	Eliminated 18th on December 11, 2017	
Melina Lezcano (Singer)	Maximiliano Buitrago (Note: Joel Ledesma was originally Melina Lezcano's professional partner. However, Melina Lezcano did not have a good deal with him. Therefore, in round 8 there was a partner change.)	Lorena Portillo	Eliminated 19th on December 11, 2017	
María Sol Pérez (Model & TV personality)	Fernando Bertona	María José de la Iglesia	Eliminated 20th on December 12, 2017	
Micaela Viciconte (Reality TV star)	Jorge Moliniers	Delfina García Escudero	Eliminated 21st on December 12, 2017	
Hernán Piquín (Dancer)	Macarena Rinaldi	Ariel Pastocchi	Semifinalists on December 14, 2017	
Lourdes Sánchez (Dancer) Gabriel «Gabo» Usandivaras (Dancer & choreographer)		María Laura «La Cata» Cattalini	Semifinalists on December 15, 2017	
Federico Bal (Actor, producer & director theatre) Laura «Laurita» Fernández (Dancer & TV and radio host)		Matías Napp	Runners-up on December 18, 2017	
Florencia «Flor» Vigna (Reality TV star)	Gonzalo Gerber	Carla Lanzi	Winners on December 18, 2017	

- In quotation marks («»), the nicknames.

=== Hosts and judges ===
Marcelo Tinelli returned as host while Moria Casán, Marcelo Polino, Ángel de Brito, and Pampita Ardohaín returned as judges. Soledad Silveyra did not return as a judge this season. On June 9, Marcelo Tinelli suffered a health problem, in the live, and was replaced by Moria Casán, so Hugo Ávila, choreographer and coach chief, replaced her momentarily. On July 24 and 25, The actress, singer and dancer, Griselda Siciliani was present replacing Moria Casán and Pampita Ardohaín because they will participate as guests in the salsa in trio, next to Freddy Villarreal and Hernán Piquín respectively.

== Scoring chart ==
Couple	Place	01	02	03	04	05	06	07	08	09	10	11	12	13	14	15	Semi-finals		Final
Couple	Place	01	02	03	04	05	06	07	08	09	10	11	12	13	14	15	01	02	Final
Florencia & Gonzalo	1	35	32	40	33	37	33	38	15	22	32	17	40	23	20	A	5		7
Federico & Laura	2	30	28	36	33	39	32	27	36	9	38	11	36	23	26	A		7	4
Lourdes & Gabriel	3	37	32	37	37	26	34	36	40	36	40	40	20	40	32	A		3	
Hernán & Macarena	3	34	32	31	40	38	29	40	35	37	24	28	34 (Note: Hernán Piquín replaced by Facundo Mazzei.)	35	33	A	4		
Micaela & Jorge	5								28	17	34	30	16	18	20	A			
María Sol & Fernando	6	31	27	35	38	21	32	20	31	30	20	33	33	40	14	A			
Melina & Maximiliano	7	33	32	22	30	13	25	13	34	29	33	28	30	38	25				
Gladys & Facundo	8	17	36	30	30	24	29	22	23	38	29	26	20	23	14				
Jey & Laura	9	27	31	34	26	13	38	35	30	32	20	22	13	34					
Mariela & Mauro	10	33	35	27	37	35	34	33	40	23	32	35	31	23					
Consuelo & Agustín	11		40	27	21	35	35	32	15	22	26	22	20						
Santiago & Bárbara	12		24	19	15	29	33	28	15	23	28	22							
Ezequiel & Solange	13	13	17	15	32	34	14	31	13	28	20	11							
Nancy & Cristián	14	26	14	27	27	17	30	15	28	40	13								
Cecilia & Facundo	15	30	30	35	27	38	24	33	23	23	16								
Rocío & Nicolás	16	29	20	27	26	36	22	27	33 (Note: Nicolás Paladini replaced by Yegven Dimitrenko.)	26	—								
Yanina & Carlos	17	28	28	21	14	27	28	21	23	17									
Freddy & Soledad	18	33	32	24	35	33	37	40	22										
Silvina & Leandro	19	22	26	29	26	35	32	19	22										
Gastón & Agustina	20	19	29	27	37	15	21	13	—										
Naiara & Jorge	21	27	24	28	33	32	28	36	—										
Christian & Nina	22	24	33	25	24	21	17	19											
José María & Noelia	23	30	25	32	23	16	14												
David & Rocío	24	31	23	30	28	12													
Alejandro & Roxana	25	13	14	23	21														
Beatriz & Yuslandi	26	23	27	17															
Marielys & Maximiliano	27	14	19																
La Tigresa & Iván	28	13																	
José & Bárbara	29	— (Note: In round 1, José Ottavis was automatically eliminated from the competition for not complying with the program's regulations.)																	
Minimum score to be saved		19	20	20	22	16	22	20	23	23	21	23	21	35	26	—			

- In italics, partial scores without the secret ballot.

Red numbers indicate the lowest score for each style.
Green numbers indicate the highest score for each style.
Indicates the couple sentenced.
Indicates the couple was saved by the judges.
Indicates the couple was saved by the public.
Indicates the couple eliminated that week.
Indicates the couple withdrew.
Indicates the couple was disqualified by the production.
Indicates the winning couple.
Indicates the runner-up couple.
Indicates the semi-finalists couples.

Notes:

- A: All couples are sent to duel to define the semifinalists.

=== Highest and lowest scoring performances ===
The best and worst performances in each dance according to the judges' 40-point scale are as follows:

Dance	Highest scored dancer(s)	Highest score	Lowest scored dancer(s)	Lowest score
Disco	Lourdes Sanchez & Gabriel Usandivaras	37	Ezequiel Cwirkaluk; La Tigresa del Oriente; Alejandro Müller & Roxana Cravero	13
Cumbia pop	Consuelo Peppino	40	Nancy Pazos; Alejandro Müller & Roxana Cravero	14
Hits	Pedro Alfonso & Florencia Vigna	40	Ezequiel Cwirkaluk	15
Trio Salsa	Hernán Piquín	40	Yanina Latorre	14
Reggaeton	Federico Bal & Laura Fernández	39	David Martínez	12
Folklore	Jey Mammón	38	José María Muscari & Noelia Marzol; Ezequiel Cwirkaluk	14
Cuarteto in Trio	Hernán Piquín; Freddy Villarreal	40	Melina Lezcano; Gastón Soffritti & Agustina Agazzani	13
Cha-cha-pop	Lourdes Sanchez & Gabriel Usandivaras; Mariela Anchipi	40	Ezequiel Cwirkaluk	13
Free Style	Nancy Pazos	40	Federico Bal & Laura Fernández	9
Rock – Jive	Lourdes Sanchez & Gabriel Usandivaras	40	Nancy Pazos	13
Tango or Milonga	Lourdes Sanchez & Gabriel Usandivaras	40	Federico Bal & Laura Fernández; Ezequiel Cwirkaluk	11
Merengue	Florencia Vigna	40	Jey Mammón	13
Tributes	Lourdes Sanchez & Gabriel Usandivaras; María Sol Pérez	40	Micaela Viciconte	18
Ballet	Hernán Piquín	33	María Sol Pérez; Gladys Jiménez	14

== Styles, scores and songs ==
=== Round 1: Disco ===
Song and scores
Date	Celebrity(s)	Song	Score				Total
Date	Celebrity(s)	Song	ÁdB	CA	MC	MP	Total
May 30	Federico Bal & Laura Fernández	«Turn The Beat Around»—Gloria Estefan	7	10	8	5	30
May 30	Silvina Luna	«Canned Heat»—Jamiroquai	5	8	6	3	22
June 1	Ezequiel Cwirkaluk	«Uptown Funk»—Mark Ronson feat. Bruno Mars	2	6	5	0	13
June 1	La Tigresa del Oriente	«Bad Girls»—Anastacia feat. Jamiroquai	0	5	8	0	13
June 2	Mariela Anchipi	«Calling All Hearts»—DJ Cassidy feat. Robin Thicke & Jessie J	8	10	9	6	33
June 2	Nancy Pazos	«Boogie Wonderland»—Earth, Wind & Fire	7	8	7	4	26
June 2	Naiara Awada	«Love Never Felt So Good»—Michael Jackson feat. Justin Timberlake	7	7	8	5	27
June 5	Hernán Piquín	«Sax»—Fleur East	10	9	8	7	34
June 5	Beatriz Prandi	«It's Raining Men»—Geri Halliwell	6	9	5	3	23
June 5	Gastón Soffritti & Agustina Agazzani	«Can't Stop the Feeling!»—Justin Timberlake	6	5	5	3	19
June 6	Lourdes Sánchez & Gabriel Usandivaras	«More Than a Woman» / «You Should Be Dancing»—Bee Gees «Le Freak»—Chic	10	10	10	7	37
June 6	Yanina Latorre	«Hush Hush; Hush Hush»—Pussycat Dolls	8	8	6	6	28
June 6	José María Muscari & Noelia Marzol	«Moves Like Jagger»—Maroon 5	6	9	9	6	30
June 8	Gladys Jiménez	«One Way Ticket»—Eruption	3	6	6	2	17
June 8	David Martínez	«Le Freak»—Chic	8	9	8	6	31
June 9	Cecilia Bonelli	«Just Dance»—Lady Gaga	9	8	8	5	30
June 9	Rocío Guirao Díaz & Nicolás Paladini	«Love Foolosophy»—Jamiroquai	6	10	8 (Note: Replaced by Hugo Ávila.)	5	29
June 9	Jey Mammón	«Ladies' Night»—Atomic Kitten	5	8	8	6	27
June 9	Christian Sancho	«Treasure»—Bruno Mars	4	9	7	4	24
June 12	Pedro Alfonso & Florencia Vigna	«24K Magic»—Bruno Mars	10	9	9	7	35
June 12	Freddy Villarreal	«September»—Earth, Wind & Fire	7	9	10	7	33
June 12	Alejandro Müller & Roxana Cravero	«Little L»—Jamiroquai	2	4	7	0	13
June 13	María Sol Pérez	«Any Which Way»—Scissor Sisters	7	9	9	6	31
June 13	Melina Lezcano	«Celebration»—Kylie Minogue	9	10	8	6	33
June 13	Marielys Alvarado	«Everlasting Love»—Gloria Estefan	2	5	6	1	14

- Sentenced: Ezequiel Cwirkaluk (13), La Tigresa del Oriente (13), Alejandro Müller & Roxana Cravero (13), Marielys Alvarado (14) and Gladys Jiménez (17)
- Saved by the judges: Ezequiel Cwirkaluk, Marielys Alvarado and Gladys Jiménez
- Saved by the public: Alejandro Müller & Roxana Cravero (60.83%)
- Eliminated: La Tigresa del Oriente (39.17%)
- Disqualified: José Ottavis & Bárbara Silenzi

=== Round 2: Cumbia ===
Song and scores
Date	Celebrity(s)	Song	Score				Total
Date	Celebrity(s)	Song	ÁdB	CA	MC	MP	Total
June 16	Mariela Anchipi	«Le hace falta un beso»—Agapornis	9	10	10	6	35
June 16	Nancy Pazos	«Loquita»—Márama	3	5	5	1	14
June 16	David Martínez	«Márchate ahora»—Los Totora	4	7	8	4	23
June 16	Naiara Awada	«Enamorarnos bailando»—The Panas	4	7	10	3	24
June 19	Federico Bal & Laura Fernández	«La noche no es para dormir»—Mano Arriba	9	6	8	5	28
June 19	Gastón Soffritti & Agustina Agazzani	«Noche loca»—Márama feat. Rombai	8	7	8	6	29
June 19	Rocío Guirao Díaz & Nicolás Paladini	«Llámame más temprano»—Mano Arriba	5	7	7	1	20
June 19	Christian Sancho	«Locuras contigo»—Rombai	10	10	8	5	33
June 20	Silvina Luna	«Bailan rochas y chetas»—Nene Malo	7	7	8	4	26
June 20	Lourdes Sánchez & Gabriel Usandivaras	«Tomate el palo»—Miss Bolivia feat. Leo García	8	9	9	6	32
June 20	Beatriz Prandi	«Amores como el nuestro»—Canto para bailar	8	7	8	4	27
June 20	Alejandro Müller & Roxana Cravero	«Yo te propongo»—Rombai	3	6	4	1	14
June 22	Hernán Piquín	«Pasarla bien»—Márama	8	9	8	7	32
June 22	María Sol Pérez	«Bailar pegados»—Los Totora	7	8	8	4	27
June 22	Marielys Alvarado	«Nena»—Márama	6	5	8	0	19
June 22	Jey Mammón	«Tonta»—Comanche	8	7	10	6	31
June 23	Yanina Latorre	«Una noche contigo»—Márama feat. Fernando Vázquez	6	7	9	6	28
June 23	José María Muscari & Noelia Marzol	«Bronceado»—Márama	6	7	7	5	25
June 23	Pedro Alfonso & Florencia Vigna	«Cuando se pone a bailar»—Rombai	6	9	10	7	32
June 26	Ezequiel Cwirkaluk	«Sola otra vez»—Ezequiel El Polaco	4	6	7	0	17
June 26	Santiago Griffo & Bárbara Silenzi	«Por amarte así»—Agapornis	6	6	8	4	24
June 26	Consuelo Peppino	«Fuera»—Karina La Princesita	10	10	10	10	40
June 27	Gladys Jiménez	«La pollera amarilla»—Gladys La Bomba Tucumana	10	9	10	7	36
June 27	Melina Lezcano	«Baila»—Agapornis	10	8	9	5	32
June 27	Cecilia Bonelli	«Sólo necesito»—#TocoParaVos	7	9	8	6	30
June 27	Freddy Villarreal	«Deja de llorar»—Ezequiel El Polaco	8	7	10	7	32

- Sentenced: Nancy Pazos (14), Alejandro Müller & Roxana Cravero (14), Ezequiel Cwirkaluk (17) and Marielys Alvarado (19)
- Saved by the judges: Ezequiel Cwirkaluk and Nancy Pazos
- Saved by the public: Alejandro Müller & Roxana Cravero (61.96%)
- Eliminated: Marielys Alvarado (38.04%)

=== Round 3: Hits ===
Song and scores
Date	Celebrity(s)	Song	Score				Total
Date	Celebrity(s)	Song	ÁdB	CA	MC	MP	Total
June 29	Yanina Latorre	«Fiesta» / «Explota mi corazón» / «Hay que venir al sur»—Raffaella Carrà	5	6	7	3	21
June 30	Mariela Anchipi	«Mi perro dinamita»—Patricio Rey y sus Redonditos de Ricota	7	8	7	5	27
June 30	María Sol Pérez	«María»—Ricky Martin	8	10	10	7	35
June 30	Naiara Awada	«La mordidita»—Ricky Martin feat. Yotuel	7	10	6	5	28
July 3	Federico Bal & Laura Fernández	«Será que no me amas»—Luis Miguel	10	10	9	7	36
July 3	Silvina Luna	«Onda Onda»—Axé Bahia	8	6	8	7	29
July 4	Gladys Jiménez	«Paisaje»—Gilda	8	7	8	7	30
July 4	Gastón Soffritti & Agustina Agazzani	«Provócame»—Chayanne	7	8	7	5	27
July 4	Melina Lezcano	«Livin' la vida loca»—Ricky Martin	4	8	6	4	22
July 4	Beatriz Prandi	«¿A quién le importa?»—Thalía	3	6	8	0	17
July 6	Nancy Pazos	«Tirá para arriba»—Miguel Mateos	7	8	7	5	27
July 6	José María Muscari & Noelia Marzol	«Matador»—Los Fabulosos Cadillacs	7	9	9	7	32
July 6	Freddy Villarreal	«Qué alegría»—Juan Carlos Calabró (Johny Tolengo)	4	6	8	6	24
July 7	Santiago Griffo & Bárbara Silenzi	«La guitarra» / «Entrega el marrón» / «Tuta Tutá» / «Corazón»—Los Auténticos Decadentes	4	8	7	0	19
July 7	Cecilia Bonelli	«Ji ji ji»—Patricio Rey y sus Redonditos de Ricota	8	10	10	7	35
July 7	David Martínez	«Yo te quiero dar»—La Mosca Tsé - Tsé	6	9	9	6	30
July 10	Ezequiel Cwirkaluk	«Loco Mía»—Locomía	2	6	7	0	15
July 10	Hernán Piquín	«Sólo se vive una vez»—Azúcar Moreno	8	8	8	7	31
July 10	Alejandro Müller & Roxana Cravero	«Dame fuego»—Sandro	5	2	9	7	23
July 11	Pedro Alfonso & Florencia Vigna	«Ritmo de la noche»—The Sacados	10	10	10	10	40
July 11	Consuelo Peppino	«La fiesta»—José Luis Rodríguez El Puma	5	8	8	6	27
July 13	Lourdes Sánchez & Gabriel Usandivaras	«Rasguña las piedras»—Sui Generis	10	10	10	7	37
July 13	Rocío Guirao Díaz & Nicolás Paladini	«El estudiante»—Los Twist	6	8	7	6	27
July 13	Christian Sancho	«Dime que me quieres»—Ricky Martin	4	9	7	5	25
July 14	Jey Mammón	«Ilariê»—Xuxa	7	10	10	7	34

- Sentenced: Ezequiel Cwirkaluk (15), Beatriz Prandi (17) and Santiago Griffo & Bárbara Silenzi (19)
- Saved by the judges: Ezequiel Cwirkaluk
- Saved by the public: Santiago Griffo & Bárbara Silenzi (77.11%)
- Eliminated: Beatriz Prandi (22.89%)
- Withdrew: Pedro Alfonso

=== Round 4: Trio Salsa ===
Song and scores
Date	Celebrity(s) / (Trio Dance Partner)	Song	Score				Total
Date	Celebrity(s) / (Trio Dance Partner)	Song	ÁdB	CA	MC	MP	Total
July 17	Mariela Anchipi / (Florencia Marcasoli)	N'Klabe – "I Love Salsa"	10	10	10	7	37
July 17	María Sol Pérez / (Brian Sarmiento)	Oscar D'León – "Llegó El Sabor"	10	9	9	10	38
July 18	Federico Bal & Laura Fernández / (Emilia Attías)	Carlos Oliva y Los Sobrinos del Juez – "El Carrito"	10	8	8	7	33
July 18	Consuelo Peppino / (Nito Artaza)	Gloria Estefan – "Mi Tierra"	5	5	7	4	21
July 20	Jey Mammón / (Lucía Galán)	«Olvídame y pega la vuelta»—Jennifer Lopez feat. Marc Anthony	5	7 (Note: Replaced by Paula Chaves.)	7	7	26
July 20	Cecilia Bonelli / (Jimena Barón)	Sonora Carruseles – "La salsa la traigo yo"	8	6	7	6	27
July 20	Rocío Guirao Díaz & Nicolás Paladini / (Darian Schijman)	Dark Latin Groove – "Magdalena, Mi amor (Quimbara)"	7	10	9	0	26
July 21	Silvina Luna / (Ximena Capristo)	Dark Latin Groove – "Acuyuyé"	6	7	8	5	26
July 21	Melina Lezcano / (Catherine Fulop)	Don Omar – "Danza Kuduro (Salsa Version)"	7	8	8	7	30
July 24	Santiago Griffo & Bárbara Silenzi / (Micaela Viciconte)	Marc Anthony – "Vivir mi Vida"	3	6	6 (Note: Replaced by Griselda Siciliani.)	0	15
July 24	Lourdes Sánchez & Gabriel Usandivaras / (Natalie Pérez)	Mercadonegro – "La Malanga"	10	10	10	7	37
July 24	Freddy Villarreal / (Moria Casán)	Revolución Salsera – "La última noche"	5	10	10	10	35
July 25	Hernán Piquín / (Pampita Ardohaín)	Gloria Estefan – "Oye!"	10	10	10	10	40
July 25	Gladys Jiménez / (Marixa Balli)	Sonora Carruseles – "Vengo Caliente"	7	9	9	5	30
July 27	Nancy Pazos / (Mora Godoy)	Típica 73 – "Baila Que Baila"	8	9	6	4	27
July 27	José María Muscari & Noelia Marzol / (María Eugenia Ritó)	Jim Carrey – "Cuban Pete"	5	7	7	4	23
July 27	Gastón Soffritti & Agustina Agazzani / (Lucas Velasco)	José Alberto "El Canario" – "Quiero Salsa"	10	10	10	7	37
July 28	Ezequiel Cwirkaluk / (Belén Pouchan)	Pochy y su Cocoband – "Salsa con Coco"	8	9	9	6	32
July 28	Yanina Latorre / (Carmela Bárbaro)	Raquel Zozaya – "Bemba Colorá"	4	5	5	0	14
July 28	Naiara Awada / (Cinthia Fernández)	Gente de Zona feat. Marc Anthony – "La Gozadera"	10	9	8	6	33
July 31	Agustín Casanova & Florencia Vigna / (Pedro Alfonso)	Orquesta La 33 – "La Rumba Buena"	8	8	10	7	33
July 31	Alejandro Müller & Roxana Cravero / (Pablo Cabaleiro (Note: Better known as El Mago Sin Dientes))	Celia Cruz – "La Vida Es Un Carnaval"	1	10	10	0	21
August 1	David Martínez / (Brian Lanzelotta)	Marc Anthony – "Valió la pena"	5	8	9	6	28
August 1	Christian Sancho / (María José Martino)	Alex Matos – "Lo malo se va bailando"	7	6	7	4	24

- Sentenced: Yanina Latorre (14), Santiago Griffo & Bárbara Silenzi (15), Consuelo Peppino (21) and Alejandro Müller & Roxana Cravero (21)
- Saved by the judges: Santiago Griffo & Bárbara Silenzi and Yanina Latorre
- Saved by the public: Consuelo Peppino (80.67%)
- Eliminated: Alejandro Müller & Roxana Cravero (19.33%)

=== Round 5: Reggaeton ===
Song and scores
Date	Celebrity(s)	Song	Score				Total
Date	Celebrity(s)	Song	ÁDB	CA	MC	MP	Total
August 4	Mariela Anchipi	Enrique Iglesias feat. Wisin – "Duele el Corazón"	8	10	10	7	35
August 4	María Sol Pérez	Maluma – "Borró Cassette"	3	9	9	0	21
August 4	Melina Lezcano	Piso 21 feat. Maluma – "Me Llamas"	5	0	8	0	13
August 4	Jey Mammón	Enrique Iglesias feat. Descemer Bueno & Zion & Lennox – "Súbeme la Radio"	0	5	8	0	13
August 7	Federico Bal & Laura Fernández	Luis Fonsi feat. Daddy Yankee – "Despacito"	10	10	9	10	39
August 7	Silvina Luna	Maluma – "Felices los 4"	9	9	10	7	35
August 8	Hernán Piquín	Cali & El Dandee feat. Juan Magán & Sebastián Yatra – "Por Fin Te Encontré"	8	10	10	10	38
August 8	Nancy Pazos	Nicky Jam feat. Enrique Iglesias – "El Perdón"	5	6	6	0	17
August 8	José María Muscari & Noelia Marzol	CNCO feat. Yandel – "Hey DJ"	4	6	6	0	16
August 8	Christian Sancho	Nicky Jam – "Hasta el Amanecer"	5	6	6	4	21
August 10	Ezequiel Cwirkaluk	Maluma – "El Perdedor"	9	8	10	7	34
August 10	Lourdes Sánchez & Gabriel Usandivaras	Shakira feat. Maluma – "Chantaje"	3	5	8	10	26
August 10	David Martínez	J Balvin – "Bobo"	3	4	5	0	12
August 11	Santiago Griffo & Bárbara Silenzi	Zion & Lennox – "Pierdo La Cabeza"	8	9	6 (Note: Replaced by María Laura "Lolo" Rossi.)	6	29
August 11	Rocío Guirao Díaz & Nicolás Paladini	Sebastián Yatra – "Traicionera"	9	10	9	8	36
August 11	Gastón Soffritti & Agustina Agazzani	J Balvin – "Ginza"	2	7	6	0	15
August 14	Agustín Casanova & Florencia Vigna	Ricky Martin feat. Maluma – "Vente Pa' Ca"	10	10	10	7	37
August 14	Yanina Latorre	CNCO – "Reggaetón Lento (Bailemos)"	7	6	8	6	27
August 14	Consuelo Peppino	Chino & Nacho – "Me Voy Enamorando"	10	10	8	7	35
August 15	Gladys Jiménez	Nicky Jam – "Travesuras"	4	5	9	6	24
August 15	Cecilia Bonelli	Nicky Jam – "El Amante"	10	10	10	8	38
August 17	Naiara Awada	Maluma feat. Don Omar & Wisin – "Sin Contrato"	7	9 (Note: Replaced by Paula Chaves.)	9	7	32
August 17	Freddy Villarreal	Yandel – "Plakito"	6	9	10	8	33

- Sentenced: David Martínez (12), Melina Lezcano (13), Jey Mammón (13) and Gastón Soffritti & Agustina Agazzani (15)
- Saved by the judges: Melina Lezcano and Jey Mammón
- Saved by the public: Gastón Soffritti & Agustina Agazzani (54.71%)
- Eliminated: David Martínez (45.29%)

=== Round 6: Folklore ===
Song and Scores
Date	Celebrity(s)	Song	Score				Total
Date	Celebrity(s)	Song	ÁDB	CA	MC	MP	Total
August 18	Mariela Anchipi	Chaqueño Palavecino – "Déjame Que Me Vaya"; Daniel Toro – "Zamba Para Olvidar"	8	9 (Note: Replaced by Paula Chaves.)	10	7	34
August 18	Christian Sancho	Los Nocheros – "La Yapa"	3	8	6	0	17
August 21	Federico Bal & Laura Fernández	Los Chalchaleros – "Zamba Por Vos"	8	9	9	6	32
August 21	Silvina Luna	Los Nocheros – "Chakay Manta"	9	7	10	6	32
August 21	Cecilia Bonelli	Los Nocheros – "La Taba"	9	8	7	0	24
August 22	Santiago Griffo & Bárbara Silenzi	Los Huayra – "Al Jardín De La República"	8	9	9	7	33
August 24	Yanina Latorre	Los Manseros Santiagueños – "El Escondido"	7	8	7	6	28
August 24	Lourdes Sánchez & Gabriel Usandivaras	Néstor Garnica – "Chacarera del Violín"	6	10	10	8	34
August 25	Gladys Jiménez	Soledad Pastorutti – "Entre A Mi Pago Sin Golpear"	9	7	6	7	29
August 25	Gastón Soffritti & Agustina Agazzani	Jorge Rojas – "Chacarera Del Olvido"	9	7	5	0	21
August 25	María Sol Pérez	Chaqueño Palavecino – "Chaco Escondido"	7	8	9	8	32
August 28	Agustín Casanova & Florencia Vigna	Soledad Pastorutti – "Chacarera De Un Triste"	7	10	9	7	33
August 28	Hernán Piquín	Abel Pintos – "Sin Principio Ni Final"	6	9	8	6	29
August 28	Melina Lezcano	Canto 4 – "Piel Morena"	5	8	7	5	25
August 28	José María Muscari & Noelia Marzol	Chaqueño Palavecino – "Troja De Amor"	1	6	7	0	14
August 29	Ezequiel Cwirkaluk	Soledad Pastorutti – "A Don Ata"	2	6	6	0	14
August 29	Jey Mammón	Los Alonsitos – "Kilómetro 11"	10	10	10	8	38
August 31	Nancy Pazos	Los Chalchaleros – "Luna Cautiva"; Peteco Carabajal – "Puente Carretero"	7	9	8	6	30
August 31	Rocío Guirao Díaz & Nicolás Paladini	Los Nocheros – "Chacarera del Rancho"	6	8	6	2	22
August 31	Consuelo Peppino	Los Nocheros – "La Telecita"	10	10	8	7	35
August 31	Freddy Villarreal	Chaqueño Palavecino – "La Refranera"	10	9	10	8	37
September 1	Naiara Awada	Chaqueño Palavecino – "La Sin Corazón"	7	8	8	5	28

- Sentenced: José María Muscari & Noelia Marzol (14), Ezequiel Cwirkaluk (14), Christian Sancho (17) and Gastón Soffritti & Agustina Agazzani (21)
- Saved by the judges: Ezequiel Cwirkaluk and Gastón Soffritti & Agustina Agazzani
- Saved by the public: Christian Sancho (58.21%)
- Eliminated: José María Muscari & Noelia Marzol (41.79%)

=== Round 7: Cuarteto in Trio ===
Song and Scores
Date	Celebrity(s) / (Guest)	Song	Score				Total
Date	Celebrity(s) / (Guest)	Song	ÁDB	CA	MC	MP	Total
September 4	Federico Bal & Laura Fernández / (María Vázquez)	Walter Olmos – "Soy Un Adicto A Ti"	7	8	6	6	27
September 5	Silvina Luna / (Iliana Calabró)	Rodrigo – "Fue Lo Mejor Del Amor"	5	7	7	0	19
September 5	Agustín Casanova & Florencia Vigna / (Marcos Gómez)	Rodrigo – "¿Como Le Digo?"	10	10	10	8	38
September 7	Nancy Pazos / (Francisco Delgado)	Walter Olmos – "Amor Fugitivo"	2	6	6	1	15
September 7	Jey Mammón / (Laura Esquivel)	Tru-la-lá – "Hace Calor"	10	9	10	6	35
September 7	Yanina Latorre / (Cae)	Rodrigo – "Ocho Cuarenta"	3	6	8	4	21
September 8	Mariela Anchipi / (Virginia Gallardo)	Rodrigo – "Qué Ironía"	8	9 (Note: Replaced by Florencia Peña.)	9	7	33
September 8	Lourdes Sánchez & Gabriel Usandivaras / (Candela Ruggeri)	Rodrigo – "Cómo Olvidarla"	10	10	8	8	36
September 8	Melina Lezcano / (Celeste Muriega)	Banda XXI – "Cuando Me Enamoro"	0	7	6	0	13
September 11	Gladys Jiménez / (Daniel Santillán)	Walter Olmos – "Por Lo Que Yo Te Quiero"	3	5	8	6	22
September 12	Ezequiel Cwirkaluk / (Bárbara Franco)	Jean Carlos – "Llegó Tu Papi"	8	9	8	6	31
September 12	Hernán Piquín / (Florencia Marcasoli)	Los Reyes del Cuarteto – "Apareciste Tú"	10	10	10	10	40
September 14	Santiago Griffo & Bárbara Silenzi / (Fernando Sily)	Banda XXI – "Qué Bonito"	7	7	8	6	28
September 14	Freddy Villarreal / (Brian Lanzelotta)	La Mona Jiménez – "Bum Bum"	10	10	10	10	40
September 15	Naiara Awada / (Micaela Viciconte)	Rodrigo – "Soy Cordobés"	10	10	9	7	36
September 15	María Sol Pérez / (Serafín Dengra)	Rodrigo – "Amor Clasificado"	3	7	5	5	20
September 18	Rocío Guirao Díaz & Nicolás Paladini / (Rocío Robles)	Rodrigo – "Fuego y Pasión"	6	9	7	5	27
September 18	Gastón Soffritti & Agustina Agazzani / (Ailén Bechara)	La Mona Jiménez – "El Agite"	2	6	5	0	13
September 19	Cecilia Bonelli / (Gisela Bernal)	Jean Carlos – "Quiéreme"	7	9	10	7	33
September 19	Consuelo Peppino / (María Fernanda Callejón)	La K'onga feat. Damián Cordoba – "Te Perdiste Mi Amor"	6	8	10	8	32
September 19	Christian Sancho / (Héctor Speranza)	Walter Olmos – "No Me Mientas"	4	9	6	0	19

- Sentenced: Melina Lezcano (13), Gastón Soffritti & Agustina Agazzani (13), Nancy Pazos (15), Silvina Luna (19) and Christian Sancho (19)
- Saved by the judges: Melina Lezcano, Gastón Soffritti & Agustina Agazzani and Nancy Pazos
- Saved by the public: Silvina Luna (54.83%)
- Eliminated: Christian Sancho (45.17%)

=== Round 8: Cha-cha-pop (Note: This round has double elimination.) ===
Song and Scores
Date	Celebrity(s)	Song	Score				Total
Date	Celebrity(s)	Song	ÁDB	CA	MC	MP	Total
September 25	Federico Bal & Laura Fernández	Jessie J feat. 2 Chainz – "Burnin' up"	10	9	9	8	36
September 25	Lourdes Sánchez & Gabriel Usandivaras	DNCE – "Cake by the Ocean"	10	10	10	10	40
September 25	María Sol Pérez	Lali Espósito – "Soy"	6	8	9	8	31
September 26	Ezequiel Cwirkaluk	Jennifer Lopez – "On the Floor"	2	5	6	0	13
September 26	Agustín Casanova & Florencia Vigna	Calvin Harris feat. Rihanna – "This Is What You Came For"	0	10	5	0	15
September 28	Santiago Griffo & Bárbara Silenzi	Mark Ronson feat. Bruno Mars – "Uptown Funk"	1	6	7	1	15
September 28	Silvina Luna	Jessie J, Ariana Grande & Nicki Minaj – "Bang Bang"	4	5	9	4	22
September 28	Yanina Latorre	Rihanna – "Where Have You Been"	6	6	6	5	23
September 29	Melina Lezcano	Jennifer Lopez feat. Pitbull – "Dance Again"	9	10	8	7	34
September 29	Mariela Anchipi	Rihanna – "Don't Stop the Music"	10	10	10	10	40
September 29	Cecilia Bonelli	Maroon 5 – "Moves Like Jagger"	1	8	8	6	23
October 2	Gladys Jiménez	Pussycat Dolls – "Hush Hush; Hush Hush"	6	5	5	7	23
October 3	Hernán Piquín	Jennifer Lopez – "Let's Get Loud"	9	10 (Note: Replaced by Florencia Peña.)	8	8	35
October 3	Rocío Guirao Díaz & Yegven Dimitrenko (Note: Replacement for Nicolás Paladini)	Ricky Martin – "Adiós"	7	9	9	8	33
October 3	Freddy Villarreal	Lady Gaga – "Poker Face"	4	8	7	3	22
October 5	Micaela Viciconte	Ariana Grande feat. Zedd – "Break Free"	6	8	8	6	28
October 5	Nancy Pazos	Lali Espósito – "Histeria"	4	8	10	6	28
October 5	Consuelo Peppino	Madonna – "Express Yourself"	4	6	5	0	15
October 6	Jey Mammón	Britney Spears – "Toxic"	7	9	7	7	30

- Sentenced: Ezequiel Cwirkaluk (13), Agustín Casanova & Florencia Vigna (15), Santiago Griffo & Bárbara Silenzi (15), Consuelo Peppino (15), Silvina Luna (22) and Freddy Villarreal (22)
- Saved by the judges: Santiago Griffo & Bárbara Silenzi, Ezequiel Cwirkaluk and Agustín Casanova & Florencia Vigna
- Saved by the public: Consuelo Peppino (67.39%)
- Eliminated: Silvina Luna (12.05%) and Freddy Villarreal (20.56%)
- Withdrew: Naiara Awada and Gastón Soffritti & Agustina Agazzani

=== Round 9: Free Style ===
Song and Scores
Date	Celebrity(s)	Theme	Song	Score				Total
Date	Celebrity(s)	Theme	Song	ÁDB	CA	MC	MP	Total
October 10	María Sol Pérez	Magic in the neighborhood	J Balvin & Willy William – "Mi Gente"	5	8	7	10	30
October 10	Melina Lezcano	The people and the mobile	Charlie Puth – "Attention" (Note: This song was also danced in the version Oliver Heldens remix.) / Drehz – "Skeletons" / Zayn Malik feat. Sia – "Dusk Till Dawn"	9	6	10	4	29
October 10	Mariela Anchipi	Love dogs	Bersuit Vergarabat – "Perro Amor Explota"	4	8	7	4	23
October 12	Santiago Griffo & Bárbara Silenzi	Latin Night	Lali Espósito – "Cuando Estoy Con Vos" / Ricky Martin – "Livin' la Vida Loca" / David Bisbal – "Oye El Boom" (Note: The songs were sung live by Santiago Griffo.)	6	8	5	4	23
October 12	Jey Mammón	Be	Gloria Trevi – "I Will Survive" / "Todos Me Miran" (Note: Jey Mammón singing at the beginning of the performance.)	7	7	10	8	32
October 12	Micaela Viciconte	Egyptian Power Ritual	Astralphonic – "Escalate" / Beyoncé – "Naughty Girl"	4	7	6	0	17
October 13	Agustín Casanova & Florencia; Vigna	Choose the story	Stan Getz – "It Don't Mean a Thing" / Elvis Presley – "Hound Dog" / Mark Ronson feat. Bruno Mars – "Uptown Funk"	7	7	7	1	22
October 13	Yanina Latorre	Grease	Grease – "Noches De Amor" / "Dulces Acordes" / "Eres Al Que Yo Quiero" (Note: The songs were sung live by Carlos Bernal, Yanina's professional dancer.)	3	5	6	3	17
October 13	Cecilia Bonelli	Edward Scissorhands	Danny Elfman – "Ice Dance"	7	5	7	4	23
October 16	Federico Bal & Laura Fernández	Chroma key	Ed Sheeran – "Shape of You (Major Lazer remix) feat. Nyla & Kranium"	0	5	4	0	9
October 16	Rocío Guirao Díaz & Nicolás Paladini	Vikings	Imagine Dragons – "Believer" / Jax Jones feat. Raye – "You Don't Know Me"	5	7	9	5	26
October 17	Ezequiel Cwirkaluk	Nostalgia and video game	Koji Kondo – "Super Mario Bros. theme"	6	8	8	6	28
October 17	Hernán Piquín	Love never dies	Hozier – "Take Me to Church"	7	10	10	10	37
October 17	Nancy Pazos	Descendants	Kristin Chenoweth – "Evil Like Me"	10	10	10	10	40
October 19	Lourdes Sánchez & Gabriel Usandivaras	Once upon a time in Mexico	Chingon – "La Malagueña" / Mon Laferte – "Tormento"	7	9	10	10	36
October 19	Gladys Jiménez	Cabaret of Gladys	Chicago – "When You're Good to Mama" (Note: The lyrics of the song was modified and was sung live by Gladys Jiménez.)	10	8	10	10	38
October 20	Consuelo Peppino	Life surprised me	Coldplay – "Viva la Vida" / Chayanne – "Madre Tierra (Oye)"	5	6	4	7	22

- Sentenced: Federico Bal & Laura Fernández (9), Micaela Viciconte (17), Yanina Latorre (17), Agustín Casanova & Florencia Vigna (22) and Consuelo Peppino (22)
- Saved by the judges: Agustín Casanova & Florencia Vigna, Consuelo Peppino and Federico Bal & Laura Fernández
- Saved by the public: Micaela Viciconte (81.09%)
- Eliminated: Yanina Latorre (18.91%)

=== Round 10: Rock – Jive (Note: This round has double elimination.) ===
Song and Scores
Date	Celebrity(s)	Song	Score				Total
Date	Celebrity(s)	Song	ÁDB	CA	MC	MP	Total
October 24	Mariela Anchipi	Glee Cast – "Proud Mary"	7	10	8	7	32
October 24	María Sol Pérez	Little Richard – "Long Tall Sally"	5	8	7	0	20
October 24	Cecilia Bonelli	Christina Aguilera – "Candyman"	3	6	7	0	16
October 26	Federico Bal & Laura Fernández	Blake Shelton – "Footloose"	10	10	10	9	39
October 26	Ezequiel Cwirkaluk	The Smithereens – "I Saw Her Standing There"	2	8	9	1	20
October 27	Santiago Griffo & Bárbara Silenzi	Elvis Presley – "Jailhouse Rock"	6	8	8	6	28
October 27	Agustín Casanova & Florencia Vigna	Teen Beach Movie – "Cruisin' for a Bruisin"	8	9	8	7	32
October 27	Micaela Viciconte	Tom Jones – "Hound Dog"	10	9	8	7	34
October 27	Jey Mammón	Patricio Rey y sus Redonditos de Ricota – "Mi Perro Dinamita"	0	8	8	4	20
October 30	Hernán Piquín	Queen – "Don't Stop Me Now"	5	9	7	3	24
October 30	Nancy Pazos	Smash Mouth – "I'm a Believer"	0	6	7	0	13
October 30	Lourdes Sánchez & Gabriel Usandivaras	Jerry Lee Lewis – "Great Balls of Fire"	10	10	10	10	40
October 30	Melina Lezcano	Glee Cast – "Greased Lightning"	8	10	8	7	33
October 31	Consuelo Peppino	Creedence Clearwater Revival – "Travelin' Band"	7	8	6	5	26
October 31	Gladys Jiménez	Elvis Presley – "Blue Suede Shoes"	5	9	9	6	29

- Sentenced: Nancy Pazos (13), Cecilia Bonelli (16), María Sol Pérez (20), Ezequiel Cwirkaluk (20) and Jey Mammón (20)
- Saved by the judges: Jey Mammón and Ezequiel Cwirkaluk
- Saved by the public: María Sol Pérez (52.93%)
- Eliminated: Cecilia Bonelli (13.68%) and Nancy Pazos (33.39%)
- Withdrew: Rocío Guirao Díaz & Nicolás Paladini

=== Round 11: Tango or Milonga (Note: This round has double elimination.) ===
Song and Scores
Date	Celebrity(s)		Song	Score				Total
Date	Celebrity(s)		Song	ÁDB	CA	MC	MP	Total
November 2	Mariela Anchipi		Astor Piazzolla – "Libertango"	8	9	10	8	35
November 3	Federico Bal & Laura Fernández		Juan d'Arienzo – "La Puñalada"	0	6	5	0	11
November 3	Agustín Casanova (Note: Agustín Casanova leaves the competition before the duel. In his place enters the professional dancer, Gonzalo Gerber.)	Florencia Vigna	Mariano Mores – "Taquito Militar"	6	6	5	0	17
November 3	Micaela Viciconte		Juan de Dios Filiberto – "Quejas De Bandoneón"	9	7	9	5	30
November 6	Santiago Griffo & Bárbara Silenzi		Aníbal Troilo – "Nocturna"	5	6	7	4	22
November 6	Lourdes Sánchez & Gabriel Usandivaras		Astor Piazzolla – "Verano Porteño"	10	10	10	10	40
November 6	Melina Lezcano		Mariano Mores – "El Firulete"	7	8	7	6	28
November 7	Ezequiel Cwirkaluk		Sexteto Mayor – "Canaro en París"	2	4	5	0	11
November 7	Hernán Piquín		Forever Tango – "La cumparsita"	8	6	7	7	28
November 7	Consuelo Peppino		Tita Merello – "Se Dice De Mí"	6	7	5	4	22
November 9	María Sol Pérez		Mariano Mores – "Tanguera"	6	9	10	8	33
November 9	Gladys Jiménez		Sebastián Piana & Homero Manzi – "Milonga Sentimental"	5	8	7	6	26
November 10	Jey Mammón		Héctor Varela – "Azucar, Pimienta y Sal"	3	9	6	4	22

- Sentenced: Federico Bal & Laura Fernández (11), Ezequiel Cwirkaluk (11), Florencia Vigna (17), Santiago Griffo & Bárbara Silenzi (22), Consuelo Peppino (22) and Jey Mammón (22)
- Saved by the judges: Florencia Vigna, Federico Bal & Laura Fernández and Jey Mammón
- Saved by the public: Consuelo Peppino (44.09%)
- Eliminated: Ezequiel Cwirkaluk (27.33%) and Santiago Griffo & Bárbara Silenzi (28.58%)
- Withdrew: Agustín Casanova

=== Round 12: Merengue ===
Song and scores
Date	Celebrity(s)	Song	Score				Total
Date	Celebrity(s)	Song	ÁDB	CA	MC	MP	Total
November 14	María Sol Pérez	Héctor Acosta – "Levántate"	8	9	8	8	33
November 14	Lourdes Sánchez & Gabriel Usandivaras	Juan Luis Guerra – "A Pedir Su Mano"	7	6	7	0	20
November 14	Mariela Anchipi	Banda XXI – "Esa Chica Tiene Swing"	9	7	8	7	31
November 14	Jey Mammón	Wilfrido Vargas – "El Baile del Perrito"	0	5	5	3	13
November 17	Federico Bal & Laura Fernández	Los Hermanos Rosario – "Que Buena Esta La Fiesta"	10	9	9	8	36
November 17	Micaela Viciconte	La Rhumba – "Muévelo"	3	7	6	0	16
November 17	Florencia Vigna	Wilfrido Vargas – "Abusadora"	10	10	10	10	40
November 20 (Note: During the third and fourth gala of the round, Moria Casán will have the secret ballot.)	Facundo Mazzei (Note: Replacement for Hernán Piquín.)	Banda XXI – "Chica Sexy"	9	8 (Note: Replaced by Lizy Tagliani.)	9	8	34
November 21	Gladys Jiménez	Oro Solido – "Moviendo las Caderas"	7	5	8	0	20
November 21	Melina Lezcano	Chichí Peralta – "Niña Bonita"	7	9	8	6	30
November 23	Consuelo Peppino	Juan Luis Guerra – "La Gallera"	5	8	4	3	20

- Sentenced: Jey Mammón (13), Micaela Viciconte (16), Lourdes Sánchez & Gabriel Usandivaras (20), Gladys Jiménez (20) and Consuelo Peppino (20)
- Saved by the judges: Gladys Jiménez, Lourdes Sánchez & Gabriel Usandivaras and Micaela Viciconte
- Saved by the public: Jey Mammón (51.66%)
- Eliminated: Consuelo Peppino (48.34%)

=== Round 13: Tributes (Note: This round has double elimination.) ===
Song and scores
Date	Celebrity(s)	Tribute	Song	Score				Total
Date	Celebrity(s)	Tribute	Song	ÁDB	CA	MC	MP	Total
November 27	Federico Bal & Laura Fernández	Walt Disney	"Disney Theme" / "A Whole New World (Instrumental)" / "Be Our Guest" / "He's a Pirate" / "Let It Go" / "It's a Small World"	4	7	6	6	23
November 27	Melina Lezcano	Valeria Lynch	"Me Das Cada Dia Más" / "Baila Conmigo" / "La Extraña Dama"	10	9	9	10	38
November 30	Jey Mammón	Carlos Balá	"El Show Va A Comenzar" / "Palabras Curiosas" / "Que Gusto Tiene La Sal" / "Felicidad Empieza Con Fe"	8	10	8	8	34
November 30	Micaela Viciconte	Charly García	"Hablando A Tu Corazón" / "Demoliendo Hoteles" / "Seminare"	1	8	9	0	18
November 30	Gladys Jiménez	Lía Crucet	"En Tu Pelo" / "Que Bello" / "La Güera Salomé"	0	6	10	7	23
December 1	Facundo Mazzei (Note: Replacement for Hernán Piquín.)	María Martha Serra Lima	"Cosas De La Vida" / "La Tercera Es la Vencida" / "A Mi Manera"	8	10	9	8	35
December 1	Lourdes Sánchez & Gabriel Usandivaras	Sandro	"Rosa Rosa" / "Dame Fuego" / "Por Ese Palpitar"	10	10	10	10	40
December 4	Florencia Vigna	Abel Pintos	"Sin Principio Ni Final" / "La Llave"	6	9	5	3	23
December 4	Mariela Anchipi	Madonna	"Vogue" / "Like a Prayer" / "Music"	5	5	8	5	23
December 4	María Sol Pérez	Luis Alberto Spinetta	"Barro Tal Vez" / "Muchacha (Ojos de papel)"	10	10	10	10	40

- Sentenced: Micaela Viciconte (18), Federico Bal & Laura Fernández (23), Gladys Jiménez (23), Florencia Vigna (23), Mariela Anchipi (23) and Jey Mammón (34)
- Saved by the judges: Federico Bal & Laura Fernández, Florencia Vigna and Gladys Jiménez
- Saved by the public: Micaela Viciconte (51.99%)
- Eliminated: Mariela Anchipi (11.38%) and Jey Mammón (36.63%)

=== Round 14: Ballet (Note: This round has double elimination.) ===
Song and scores
Date	Celebrity(s)	Song	Score				Total
Date	Celebrity(s)	Song	ÁDB	CA	MC	MP	Total
December 7	Federico Bal & Laura Fernández	Georges Bizet – "Suite"	6	8	7	5	26
December 7	María Sol Pérez	Pyotr Ilyich Tchaikovsky – "Piano Concerto No. 1"	2	7	5	0	14
December 7	Micaela Viciconte	Georges Bizet – "Habanera"	5	6	8	1	20
December 8	Hernán Piquín	Giuseppe Verdi – "Il corsaro"	8	9	8 (Note: Replaced by Nacha Guevara.)	8	33
December 8	Lourdes Sánchez & Gabriel Usandivaras	Pyotr Ilyich Tchaikovsky – "Swan Lake: Overture"	8	8	9	7	32
December 8	Florencia Vigna	Pyotr Ilyich Tchaikovsky – "Swan Lake: Vals"	4	7	5	4	20
December 8	Gladys Jiménez	Pyotr Ilyich Tchaikovsky – "Swan Lake: Cisne Negro"	0	6	8	0	14
December 11	Melina Lezcano	Ludwig Minkus – "Don Quixote"	6	7	8	4	25

- Sentenced: María Sol Pérez (14), Gladys Jiménez (14), Micaela Viciconte (20), Florencia Vigna (20) and Melina Lezcano (25)
- Saved by the judges: Florencia Vigna and Micaela Viciconte
- Saved by the public: María Sol Pérez (42.86%)
- Eliminated: Gladys Jiménez (17.78%) and Melina Lezcano (39.36%)

=== Round 15: Latin pop (Note: This round has double elimination.) ===
Song and scores
Date	Celebrity(s)	Song	Result
December 12	Federico Bal & Laura Fernández	Lali – "Histeria"	Advanced to the Semi-finals
December 12	María Sol Pérez	Ricky Martin feat. Maluma – "Vente Pa' Ca"	Eliminated
December 12	Hernán Piquín	Shakira – "Me Enamoré"	Advanced to the Semi-finals
December 12	Micaela Viciconte	Ricky Martin – "Pégate"	Eliminated
December 12	Florencia Vigna	Martina Stoessel feat. Nacho – "Te Quiero Más"	Advanced to the Semi-finals
December 12	Lourdes Sánchez & Gabriel Usandivaras	Maluma – "Carnaval"	Advanced to the Semi-finals

- Saved by the judges: Federico Bal & Laura Fernández, Lourdes Sánchez & Gabriel Usandivaras and Hernán Piquín
- Saved by the public: Florencia Vigna (41.31%)
- Eliminated: María Sol Pérez (18.11%) and Micaela Viciconte (40.58%)

=== Semifinals: Rock – Jive / Folklore / Cha-cha-pop / Cuarteto ===
==== 1st Semi-final ====
Song and scores
Date	Celebrity(s)	Style	Song	Score				Total
Date	Celebrity(s)	Style	Song	ÁDB	CA	MC	MP	Total
1st Semi-final (December 14)	Hernán Piquín	Rock – Jive	Queen – "Don't Stop Me Now"					1
1st Semi-final (December 14)	Florencia Vigna	Rock – Jive	Teen Beach Movie – "Cruisin' for a Bruisin"					0
1st Semi-final (December 14)	Hernán Piquín	Folklore	Abel Pintos – "Sin Principio Ni Final"					1
1st Semi-final (December 14)	Florencia Vigna	Folklore	Soledad Pastorutti – "Chacarera De Un Triste"					0
1st Semi-final (December 14)	Hernán Piquín	Cha-cha-pop	Jennifer Lopez – "Let's Get Loud"					1
1st Semi-final (December 14)	Florencia Vigna	Cha-cha-pop	Calvin Harris feat. Rihanna – "This Is What You Came For"					0
1st Semi-final (December 14)	Hernán Piquín	Cuarteto	Los Reyes del Cuarteto – "Apareciste Tú"					1
1st Semi-final (December 14)	Florencia Vigna	Cuarteto	Rodrigo – "¿Como Le Digo?"					0

Totals
Celebrity(s)	Subtotal	Telephone vote	Total	Tie-breaker (Telephone vote)	Total final
Hernán Piquín	4	40.02% (0)	4	43.47% (0)	4
Florencia Vigna	0	59.98% (4)	4	56.53% (1)	5

Notes

- : The point is for the couple.
- : The point is not for the couple.

Result

- Finalist: Florencia Vigna
- Semifinalist: Hernán Piquín

==== 2nd Semifinal ====
Song and scores
Date	Celebrity(s)	Style	Song	Score				Total
Date	Celebrity(s)	Style	Song	ÁDB	CA	MC	MP	Total
2nd Semi-final (December 15)	Lourdes Sánchez & Gabriel Usandivaras	Rock – Jive	Jerry Lee Lewis – "Great Balls of Fire"					1
2nd Semi-final (December 15)	Federico Bal & Laura Fernández	Rock – Jive	Blake Shelton – "Footloose"					1
2nd Semi-final (December 15)	Lourdes Sánchez & Gabriel Usandivaras	Folklore	Néstor Garnica – "Chacarera del Violín"					1
2nd Semi-final (December 15)	Federico Bal & Laura Fernández	Folklore	Los Chalchaleros – "Zamba Por Vos"					1
2nd Semi-final (December 15)	Lourdes Sánchez & Gabriel Usandivaras	Cha-cha-pop	DNCE – "Cake by the Ocean"					1
2nd Semi-final (December 15)	Federico Bal & Laura Fernández	Cha-cha-pop	Jessie J feat. 2 Chainz – "Burnin' up"					0
2nd Semi-final (December 15)	Lourdes Sánchez & Gabriel Usandivaras	Cuarteto	Rodrigo – "Cómo Olvidarla"					0
2nd Semi-final (December 15)	Federico Bal & Laura Fernández	Cuarteto	Walter Olmos – "Soy Un Adicto A Ti"					1

Totals
Celebrity(s)	Subtotal	Telephone vote	Total
Lourdes Sánchez & Gabriel Usandivaras	3	47.78% (0)	3
Federico Bal & Laura Fernández	3	52.22% (4)	7

Notes

- : The point is for the couple.
- : The point is not for the couple.

Result

- Finalists: Federico Bal & Laura Fernández
- Semifinalists: Lourdes Sánchez & Gabriel Usandivaras

=== Final: Disco / Tango or Milonga / Merengue / Cumbia pop ===
Song and scores
Date	Celebrity(s)	Style	Song	Score				Total
Date	Celebrity(s)	Style	Song	ÁDB	CA	MC	MP	Total
Final (December 18)	Florencia Vigna	Disco	Bruno Mars – "24K Magic"					1
Final (December 18)	Federico Bal & Laura Fernández	Disco	Gloria Estefan – "Turn The Beat Around"					1
Final (December 18)	Florencia Vigna	Tango or Milonga	Mariano Mores – "Taquito Militar"					0
Final (December 18)	Federico Bal & Laura Fernández	Tango or Milonga	Juan d'Arienzo – "La Puñalada"					1
Final (December 18)	Florencia Vigna	Merengue	Wilfrido Vargas – "Abusadora"					1
Final (December 18)	Federico Bal & Laura Fernández	Merengue	Los Hermanos Rosario – "Que Buena Esta La Fiesta"					1
Final (December 18)	Florencia Vigna	Cumbia pop	Rombai – "Cuando Se Pone A Bailar"					1
Final (December 18)	Federico Bal & Laura Fernández	Cumbia pop	Mano Arriba – "La Noche No Es Para Dormir"					1

Totals
Celebrity(s)	Subtotal	Telephone vote	Total
Federico Bal & Laura Fernández	4	49.91% (0)	4
Florencia Vigna	3	50.09% (4)	7

Notes:

- : The point is for the couple.
- : The point is not for the couple.

Result:

- Winner: Florencia Vigna
- Runners-up: Federico Bal & Laura Fernández
