= Fandiño =

Fandiño is a Spanish surname. Notable people with the surname include:

- Iván Fandiño (1980–2017), Spanish bullfighter
- Soledad Fandiño (born 1982), Argentine actress
