= Lourdes Sánchez =

Argentine dancer, television presenter, actress, model and singer

Lourdes Sanchez
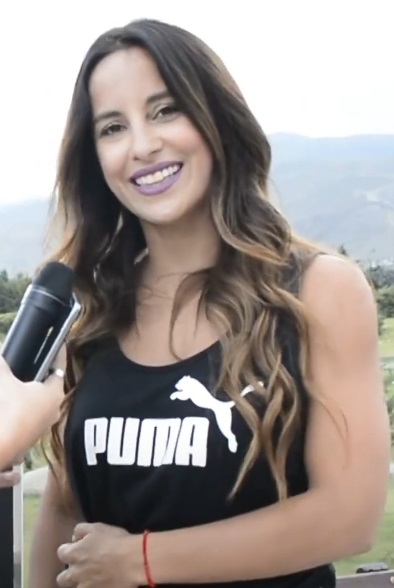
- Born: María Lourdes Sánchez; 3 May 1981 (age 45); Corrientes, Argentina
- Other name: Lourdes Sanchez
- Occupations: Actress; dancer; television presenter; singer
- Years active: 2008–present
- Partner: Pablo Prada (2011–present)
- Children: 1

María Lourdes Sánchez (born 5 March 1986) is an Argentine dancer, television presenter, actress, model, and singer. She is known for having participated in several seasons of the reality show Dancing for a Dream, a segment broadcast within the program Showmatch, which resulted in be a semifinalist in the season 12 (2017) and the season 14 (2019).

== Professional career ==
Sánchez began her career as a dancer on television after being chosen in a casting for the production of Showmatch in Ciudad de Corrientes to be the dance partner of the designer Jorge Ibañez in the 2008 edition of the Dancing for a dream conducted by Marcelo Tinelli. The following year, she was once again summoned to form the dance team of the journalist Tití Fernández in the Musical of your dreams, in which they were the twelfth team eliminated. That same year, she is called by Gerardo Sofovich to join the dance corps of the play Gracias a la villa at the Teatro del Lago in Villa Carlos Paz. From 2010 to 2012, Lourdes was part of the stable cast of Showmatch dancers, who always performed the opening of the programs and assisted both the codnuctor and the participants. During that period, she participated in the Cordoban fiction Locos del toma (2011) and was summoned to be part of the show Excitante produced by Daniel Comba at the Astros Theater.

She was also part of the program La cocina del show (2011–2012) broadcast by eltrece for two years and in turn was signed to be the dance partner by Agustín Morgante in the second edition of Soñando por Bailar. In 2012, Sánchez participated in the sitcom Concubinos on eltrece along with Pedro Alfonso, Paula Chaves, Marcelo de Bellis and Federico Bal, where she played Milagros, a neighbor with very particular tastes. That year, she was signed by Dabope Producciones to be part of the main cast of the play Journey of Madness (2012–2013) at the Holiday Theater, where she played Elmer's girlfriend (Freddy Villareal). In 2013, she was part of the staff of dancers of the program Susana Giménez broadcast by Telefe.

In 2014, Sánchez gained popularity in the media by participating in the 2014 edition of Dancing for a Dream, where she accompanied the actor Diego Reinhold, in which she performed even more public about his sentimental relationship with Pablo "El Chato" Prada, one of the program's producers and where his rivalry with the dancer Laurita Fernández became known. That same year, he joined the cast of the play Casaphantom, where he shared the bill with Pedro Alfonso, Benjamín Amadeo, Luciana Salazar and Lizy Tagliani. There she played Romina, a role for which she won the award of the Summer Girl awarded by the VOS Awards. In 2015, she again participated in the 2015 edition of Dancing for a Dream as a partner of the actor Fernando Dente, who became the twentieth couple eliminated from the contest after losing the telephone duel with actor Federico Bal. That year, Lourdes played Nicole in the play Marcianos en la casa directed by Carlos Olivieri, this role led her to her first nomination at the Carlos Awards for Best Supporting Actress. During that same summer season she participated as a panelist in the Cordoba program El chaos show.

In 2016, she got the opportunity to host her own children's show entitled El Universo de Lourdes, which was broadcast in the mornings of América TV and had her own album of music of her It also received a nomination for the Martín Fierro Awards in 2017 as Best Children's / Youth Program and had its theatrical adaptation for the summer season in Carlos Paz. Parallel to her work on television, Lourdes participated in the dance show Bien Argentino between 2016 and 2017. She is also summoned for the first time as a figure to participate in the 2017 edition of Dancing for a dream, where she turned out to be one of the semifinalists of the competition. In 2018, after making several temporary replacements, Ángel de Brito called her to officiate as a stable panelist in his u program of shows LAM. In turn, she participated in the Bailando 2018 as a celebrity along with the actor Diego Ramos, turning out to be the sixteenth couple eliminated after losing in the telephone vote with the athlete Micaela Viciconte and the actress María del Cerro.

In 2019, Sánchez participates again in Dancing for a Dream in his fourteenth season with actor Federico Bal. In turn, she was one of the protagonists of the play Únicas, Puertas del Amor with Sandra Mihanovich, Valeria Archimó, Anita Martínez and Cecilia Figaredo at the Broadway theater. She is currently the host of the program The preview of The Academy broadcast by the cable signal Ciudad Magazine together with Lizardo Ponce, Celeste Muriega, Gabriel Fernández (producer of the program) and Martín Salwe.

== Personal life ==
Since 2011, Sánchez has been in a relationship with television and theater producer Pablo "El Chato" Prada, with whom she had a son in 2016, whom they named Valentín.

== Filmography ==
=== Television ===
Year	Title	Paper	Notes	Channel
2008	Showmatch: Bailando 2008	Ballerina by Jorge Ibáñez	12th couple eliminated	eltrece
2009	Showmatch: El musical de tus Sueños	Member of the team of Titi Fernández	9th team eliminated	eltrece
2010–2012	Showmatch: Bailando por un Sueño	Dancer staff member		eltrece
2010	Real Estate	Catalina "Cata"	Main cast	Once TV
2011	Tomato Crazy	Castinera	Special participation	Channel 10 (Cordoba)
2011–2012	The kitchen of the show	Dancer staff member		eltrece
2011–2012	Dreaming about dancing 2	Dancer by Agustín Morgante	16th couple eliminated	eltrece
2012	The kitchen of the show: Concubines	Miracles	Secondary character	eltrece
2013	Susana Giménez	Dancer staff member		Telefe
2014	Showmatch: Bailando 2014	Dancer of Diego Reinhold	20th couple eliminated	eltrece
2015	Showmatch: Bailando 10 años	Dancer of Fernando Dente	23rd couple eliminated	eltrece
2015	The chaos show	Panelist		eldoce (Cordoba)
2016–2018	The universe of Lourdes	Host		America TV
2017	Showmatch: Bailando 2017	Participant	Semifinalist	eltrece
2018 - 2020	LAM	Panelist		eltrece
2018	Showmatch: Bailando 2018	BAR-SM member Participant with Diego Ramos	15th couple eliminated	eltrece
2019	Showmatch: Súper Bailando	Participant with Federico Bal	semi-finalists	eltrece
2020 - 2021	Must see	Panelist		elnueve
2020	Nara what to see	Replacement host	Temporary replacement	elnueve
2020 - 2021	The preview of Cantando	Host		Ciudad Magazine
2020	Cantando 2020	BAR-SM member	Temporary participation	eltrece
2021–present	Eat to see	Host		elnueve
2021	The preview of La Academia	Host		Ciudad Magazine
2021	Showmatch: Bailando 2021	Participant with Pablo Prada	They leave voluntarily	eltrece

=== Radius ===
Year	Program	Station
2020-2021	Okay x3	Value 97.5

== Theater ==
Year	Title	Paper	Notes	Director	Theater
2009–2010	Thanks to the village	Ballerina	Theatrical debut	Gerardo Sofovich	Lake Theater
2011	Exciting	Showgirl	Secondary role	Daniel Comba	Astros Theater
2012–2013	Journey of madness	Elmer's Girlfriend	Supporting actress	Carlos Olivieri	Holiday Theater
2014–2015	Ghost house	Ivana	Supporting actress	Carlos Olivieri	Holiday Theater
2015–2016	Martians in the house	Nicole	Co-star	Carlos Olivieri	Holiday Theater
2016	Spring summer collection	Ballerina	Co-star	Fernando Dente	astral theater
2016–2017	Well Argentine	Prima ballerina	Protagonist	Angel Carabajal	Theatre of the Sun
2017–2018	The universe of Lourdes	Cheerleader	Protagonist	John Paul Martinez	Theatre of the Sun
2019–2020	Unique, doors of love	Ballerina	Co-star	Anita Martínez; Valeria Archimó	Broadway Theater

== Advertisements ==
- Contractil (2022)

== Discography ==
Album

- The Universe of Lourdes (2016)

== Awards and nominations ==
List of awards and nominations
Year	Organization	Category	Job	Result	Ref
2010	Carlos Awards	Best Dance Corps	"Thanks to the village"	Won	
2013	VOS Awards	Summer Girl	Journey of madness	Nominated	
2015	VOS Awards	Summer Girl	Ghost house	Won	
2015	The Most Clicked Awards	Celebrities with the Most Rating on the Internet	Herself	Won	
2016	Carlos Awards	Best Supporting Actress	Martians in the house	Nominated	
2016	The Most Clicked Awards	Celebrities with the Most Rating on the Internet	Herself	Won	
2017	Martin Fierro Awards	Best Children / Youth Program	The universe of Lourdes	Nominated	
2017	The Most Clicked Awards	Celebrities with the Most Rating on the Internet	Herself	Won	
2018	VO Awards	Best Children's Show	The universe of Lourdes	Nominated	
2018	Charles Awards	Best Children's Show	The universe of Lourdes	Nominated	
2018	Concert Star Awards	Best Children's Show	The universe of Lourdes	Won	
2018	Most Clicked Awards	Celebrities with the Most Rating on the Internet	Herself	Won	
2019	Most Clicked Awards	Celebrities with the Most Rating on the Internet	Herself	Won	
