= Diego Ramos =

Argentine actor

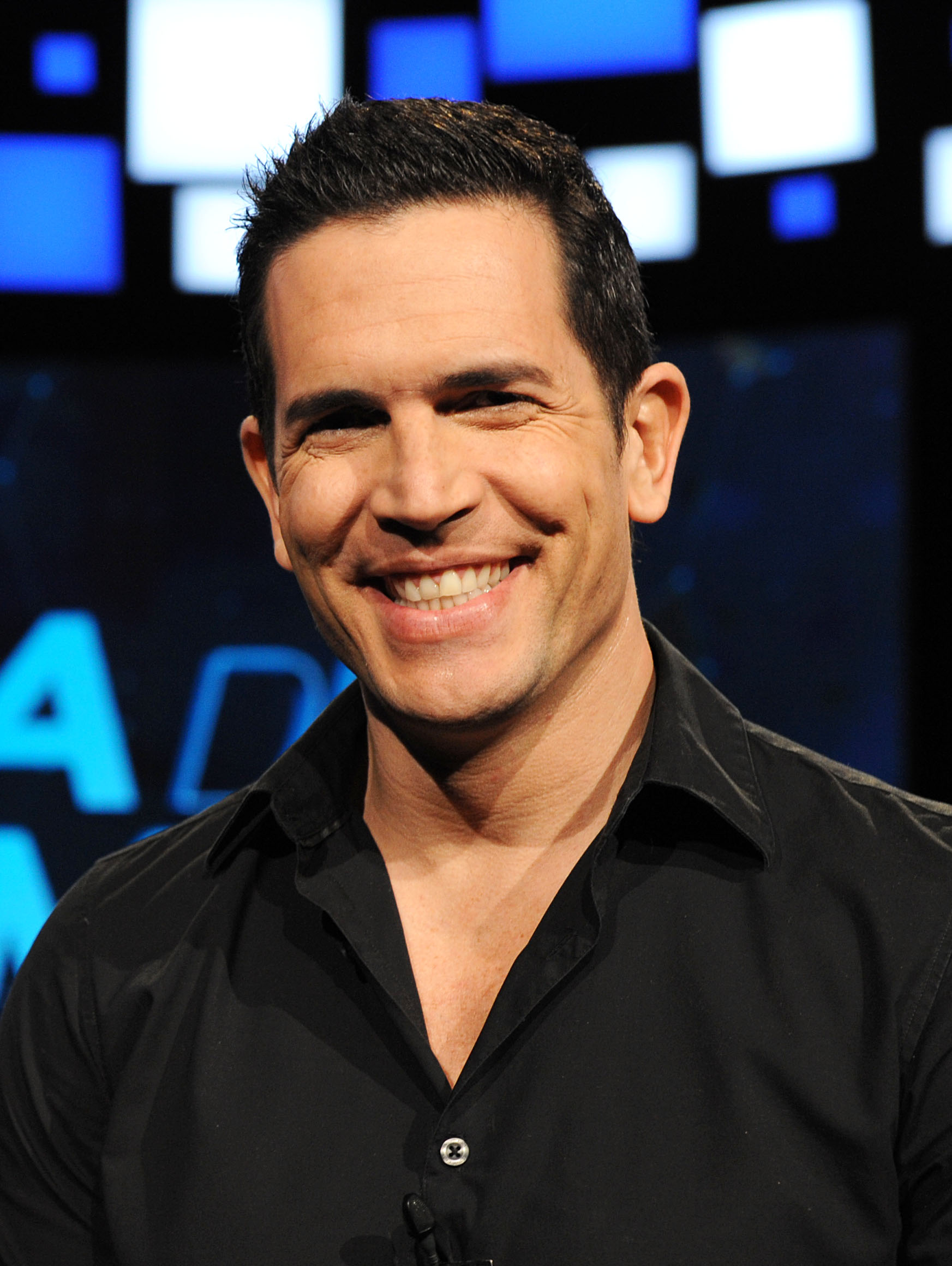
- Born: Diego César Ramos; 29 November 1972 (age 53); Palermo, Buenos Aires, Argentina
- Occupation: Actor
- Years active: 1994–present

Diego César Ramos (Palermo, Buenos Aires 29 November 1972) is an Argentine actor. He is best known for his performance as Germán Castillo in the TV series Violetta.

== Biography ==
Ramos was born in the clinic Marini in Palermo, a quarter of Buenos Aires, the capital of Argentina. Before he became an actor, he graduated from El Colegio San Francisco de Sales in Córdoba and was attending yearlong commercial course. He grew up in Almagro, Buenos Aires City. He has four children.

== Filmography ==
=== Film ===
Year	Title	Role	Notes
2013	Metegol	Grosso	Voice
2016	Tini: The Movie	Germán	

=== Television ===
Year	Title	Role	Notes
1994–1995	Montaña rusa	Maximiliano	Supporting role
1997	Ricos y famosos	Diego Salerno	Lead role
1998–2000	Verano del 98	Bruno Beláustegui	Co-lead role
1999	Muñeca brava	Sergio Costa Junior	Special participation
2000	Amor latino	Fernando Domeq	Lead role
2001–2002	Pedro el escamoso	Sandro Billycich	Supporting role
2003–2004	El auténtico Rodrigo Leal	Alberto Díaz Lopera / Alberto Di Lorenzo	Supporting role
2003–2004	Ángel de la guarda, mi dulce compañía	Miguel Ángel Cruz	Lead role
2005	Lorena	Miguel Ferrero	Lead role
2006	Casados con hijos	Aníbal	Episode: "Hasta que la suerte nos separe"
2007–2008	Patito feo	Andrés Olivieri / Federico Oliveri	Supporting role
2008–2009	Los exitosos Pells	Tomás Andrada	Co-lead role
2009–2010	Herencia de amor	Franco	Supporting role
2010	Sutiles diferencias	Doctor	Co-lead role
2011	Sr. y Sra. Camas	Leo Parisi	Co-lead role
2012–2015	Violetta	Germán Castillo	Lead role
2013	Take Two with Phineas and Ferb	Himself	Episode: "Entrevista con Diego Ramos"
2013	Solamente vos	Benson	Special participation
2018	Bailando 2018	Participant	With Lourdes Sánchez
2019	Bailando 2019	Invited	In trio salsa, with Luciana Salazar
