= Contra las cuerdas =

Argentine sports-orientated telenovela

Contra las cuerdas is an Argentine sports-oriented telenovela. It was recorded during 2010. The show stars Rodrigo de la Serna, Soledad Fandiño and Osmar Núñez.

== Plot ==
Contra las cuerdas is about a boxer named Ezequiel who travels from the Argentine interior to Buenos Aires in order to find his brother Luciano. Once Ezequiel arrives in Buenos Aires, the brothers meet a woman named Ana, which will lead them to romance and trouble.

== Production ==
Contra las cuerdas was produced by ON TV Llorente together with Villaruel Contenidos for Telefe.

== International versions ==
Contra el destino is a Colombian adaptation of Contra las cuerdas. It was produced by RCN TV channel. It tells the story of a boxer who goes to Bogotá to hide after refusing to lose a fight for the mob.
