= Take Two with Phineas and Ferb =

Short-form parody talk show

- Created by: Dan Povenmire: Jeff "Swampy" Marsh
- Based on: Phineas and Ferb by Dan Povenmire; Jeff "Swampy" Marsh
- Starring: Vincent Martella; Thomas Sangster; Dan Povenmire; Alyson Stoner; Ashley Tisdale
- Countries of origin: United States; Canada
- Original language: English
- No. of seasons: 1
- No. of episodes: 20

Production
- Running time: 2:30 minutes
- Production companies: Studio B Productions; Hieroglyphic Productions; Disney Television Animation

Original release
- Network: Disney Channel
- Release: December 3, 2010 – November 25, 2011

Take Two with Phineas and Ferb is a live-action/animated hybrid short-form talk show series that premiered on Disney Channel on December 3, 2010. It is a spin-off of the animated series Phineas and Ferb and revolves around the two animated characters Phineas and Ferb interviewing live-action celebrities, a premise which bears similarities to that of the late-night animated talk show Space Ghost Coast to Coast on Adult Swim. Several other local guests have appeared in countries outside the United States.

== Episodes ==
No.	Guest	Original release date	Prod. code
1	Jack Black	December 3, 2010	101
2	Andy Samberg	December 10, 2010	102
3	Seth Rogen	January 7, 2011	103
4	Tony Hawk	January 21, 2011	104
5	Taylor Swift	February 18, 2011	105
6	Regis Philbin	February 25, 2011	107
7	Neil Patrick Harris	March 18, 2011	106
8	Randy Jackson	March 25, 2011	108
9	Emma Roberts	April 8, 2011	109
10	Cedric the Entertainer	April 29, 2011	110
11	David Beckham	July 23, 2011	111
12	Howie Mandel	July 30, 2011	112
13	Miss Piggy	August 20, 2011	113
14	Tom Bergeron	September 16, 2011	114
15	Ty Pennington	September 23, 2011	115
16	Shaun White	October 14, 2011	116
17	Larry King	October 28, 2011	117
18	Jason Segel	November 5, 2011	118
19	Ben Stiller	November 11, 2011	119
20	Guy Fieri	November 25, 2011	120

== Release ==
The series aired from December 3, 2010 until November 25, 2011. The first ten episodes of the series were later released on the streaming service Disney+.

=== International releases ===
Many other local guests have appeared in countries outside the United States.

Channel	Title	Release dates	Country/Region
Disney Channel (Latin America)	Óscar Pérez Rojas		Latin America
Disney Channel (Latin America)	Mariano Martínez		Latin America
Disney Channel (Latin America)	Diego Ferrero		Latin America
Disney Channel (Latin America)	Axel		Latin America
Disney Channel (Latin America)	Ha*Ash		Latin America
Disney Channel (Latin America)	Diego Ramos		Latin America
Disney Channel (Latin America)	Diego Forlán		Latin America
Disney Channel (Latin America)	Javier Mascherano		Latin America
Disney Channel (Latin America)	Carlos Valderrama		Latin America
Disney Channel (Latin America)	Radamel Falcao		Latin America
Disney Channel (Latin America)	NX Zero		Latin America
Disney Channel (Latin America)	Dante		Latin America
Disney Channel (Latin America)	Neymar Jr		Latin America
Disney Channel (Latin America)	College 11		Latin America
Disney Channel (Australia)	Charlie Pickering	February 2011	Oceania
Disney Channel (Australia)	Delta Goodrem		Oceania
Disney Channel (Australia)	Jessica Mauboy		Oceania
Disney Channel (Australia)	Poh Ling Yeow		Oceania
Disney Channel (Australia)	Rove McManus		Oceania
Disney Channel (Israel)	Eyal Kitzis		Middle East
Disney Channel (Germany)	Alec Völkel		Germany
Family Channel (Canada)		December 29, 2010	Canada
Disney Channel (India)		December 25, 2011	South Asia
Disney Channel (Southeast Asia)		February 10, 2011	Southeast Asia
Disney Channel (UK & Ireland)	Richard Hammond	September 17, 2011	British Isles
