= Esmeralda Mitre =

Argentine actress (born 1982)

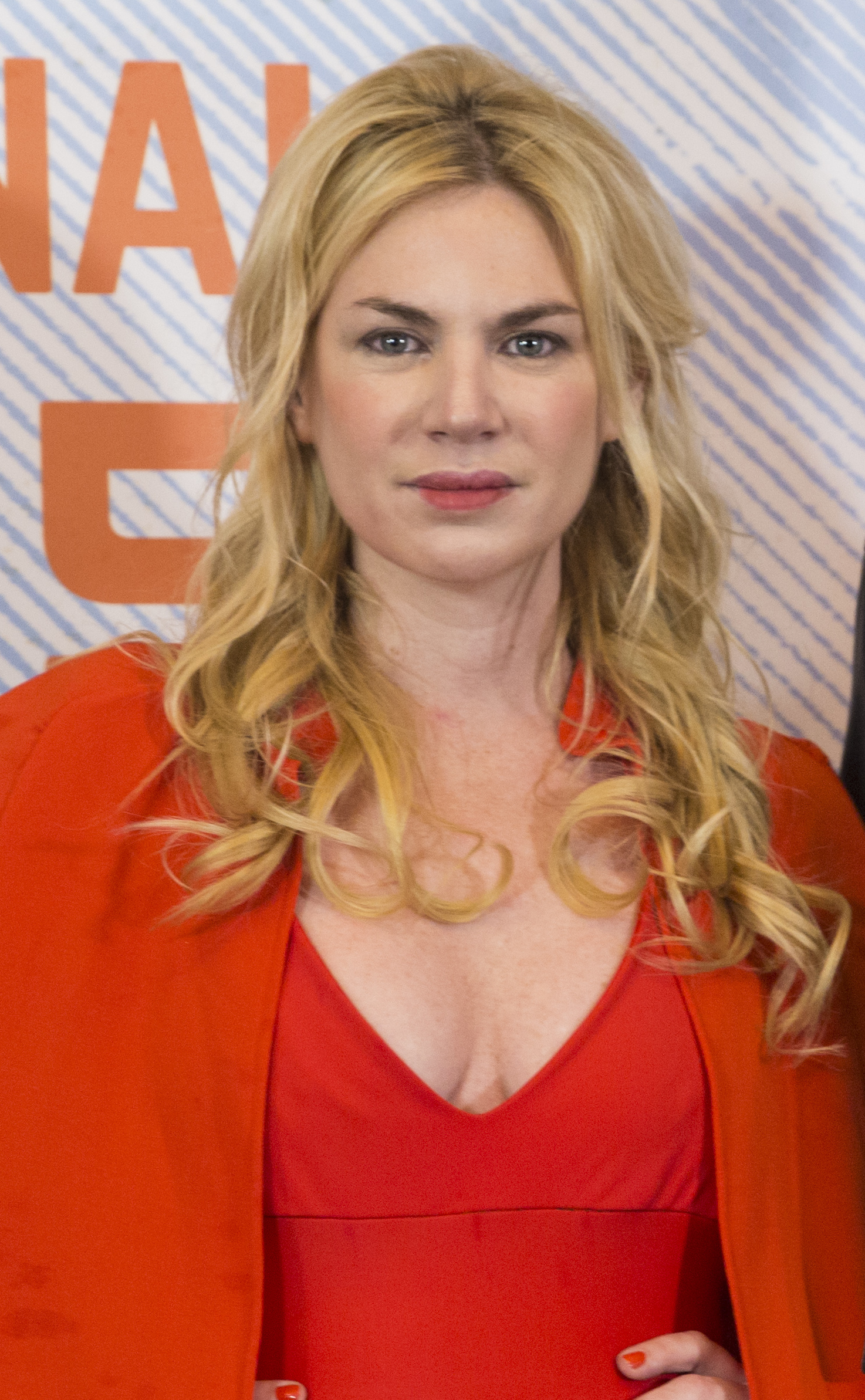
- Mitre in 2017
- Born: 14 May 1982 (age 44); Buenos Aires, Argentina
- Occupation: Actress
- Spouse: Darío Lopérfido (m. 2014; div. 2018)

Esmeralda Mitre (born 14 May 1982) is an Argentine actress. She is a descendant of ex-president and founder of the La Nación newspaper, Bartolomé Mitre.

== Biography ==
Esmeralda Mitre was born in Buenos Aires, Argentina, in 1982. She is the daughter of ex-model and plastic artist Blanca Isabel Álvarez de Toledo and Bartolomé Luis Mitre. She began her acting career when she was almost 20.

Her first plays were in unitarios and soap operas, then she veered to theatre and film. In 2008, she starred in Ariel Broitman's La vida anterior, with Elena Roger. In July 2010, she interpreted Ofelia in Hamlet under the helm of Juan Carlos Gené in the Teatro Presidente Alvear theatre. In 2014, she worked in Marcos Carnevale's play, Adictas a vos, and in television she was in Taxxi, on Telefé, and Guapas on Canal 13 where she interpreted Dolores Hasting. In 2015, her then husband, Darío Lopérfido, was appointed director of Teatro Colón, his appointment drew criticism as they questioned the appointment of a political figure without any credentials for the job, also they questioned his access to the job after his marriage with Esmeralda Mitre, attributing that designation to the marriage.

== Filmography ==
=== Television ===
Television
Year	Title	Character	Channel
2004	Floricienta	Lucía	Canal 13
2005	Soy tu fan	Cloe	Canal 9
2007	Los cuentos de Fontanarrosa	Camila	TV Pública
2013–2014	Taxxi, amores cruzados	Carla Barrientos	Telefe
2014	Guapas	Dolores Hasting	Canal 13
2016	Por amarte así	Camila	Telefe
2018	Anexo:Bailando 2018	Official participant	El Trece
2020	Anexo:Cantando 2020	Official participant	El Trece

=== Films ===
Cinema
Year	Title	Character	Director
2003	Dolores de casada	Sol	Juan Manuel Jiménez
2014	Amapola	Sisy	Eugenio Zanetti

== Short films ==
Cortometrajes
Year	Title	Director
2008	No Remake	Edgardo Cozarinsky
2013	Incendios	Sergio Renán

== Public sponsoring ==
- 2009–2010 Image and face of Gino Lozano hair saloons
- 2010 Image of Givenchy
