= Benjamín Alfonso =

Argentine actor, model and industrial designer

- Born: Benjamín Alfonso; 22 May 1984 (age 41); San Isidro, Buenos Aires, Argentina
- Occupations: Actor; Model; Industrial designer
- Years active: 2009–present

Benjamín Alfonso (born 22 May 1984) is an Argentine actor, writer and industrial designer. He rose to the fame in 2013, playing Axel Piñeiro in the series Señales. In 2015, he gained more popularity for its guest role in the miniseries Historia de un clan as Juani y Educando a Nina (2016) as Martin "Tincho" Massey, both aired in Telefe.

== Early life ==
Alfonso was born on 22 May 1984 in San Isidro, Buenos Aires where he grew up with his six siblings. He worked in a printing Barracas and lived a while in Hawaii and Costa Rica where he took up surfing, there he worked as a gardener and bartender to pay for all his expenses. In 2006, Alfonso made his first public appearance starring in a commercial for Gillette.

At the age of 22, his psychologist had recommended that he should take theater lessons, after this advice he pursued the career of Industrial Engineering but went on to study Industrial Design from which he received and began to venture into his acting career debuting on the El trece series Enseñame a vivir.

== Career ==
He began his career as a model with the agency Multitalent Agency, making several photographic productions for different magazines and campaigns to Falabella y Herencia; among other. Then he made his debut as an actor in 2012, participating in soap operas as Dulce amor and Graduados, both aired by Telefe y en Sos mi hombre, aired by El trece.

In 2013, Alfonso is persuaded by a producer with whom he played football to appear in the musical youth series Señales aired in the TV Pública playing Axel Piñeiro an egomaniac, cynical and very competitive guy. He also made the publicity of Twistos with Nicole Luis and for the drink Bretaña.

== Filmography ==
=== Film ===
Year	Title	Role	Notes
2017	Casi leyendas	Daniel "Dani"	
2017	Chic & Chambray	Angelo	Short film

=== Television ===
Series
Year	Title	Role	Notes	Network
2009	Enseñame a vivir	Benjamín Buzzi	Extra	El trece
2010	Hombre al agua	Himself		El trece
2012	Graduados	Hombre en el bar	Guest role	Telefe
2012	Sos mi hombre		Guest role	El trece
2012	Dulce amor		Guest role	Telefe
2013-2014	Señales	Axel Piñeiro	Main role	TV Pública
2014	Viudas e hijos del Rock & Roll	Facundo	9 episodes	Telefe
2015	Historia de un clan	Juani		Telefe
2016	Educando a Nina	Martín "Tincho" Massey		Telefe
2017	Quiero vivir a tu lado	Indio Laprida	Guest role	El trece
2018	Las estrellas	Juan Segundo "Juanse" Faulkner	Guest role	El trece
2018	Rizhoma Hotel	Franco		El trece
2018	Club de Cuervos			Netflix
2018	Yo, Potro	Fabrizio Romani		Netflix
2018	Mi hermano es un clon	Antonio Hauser		El trece

Reality shows
Year	Title	Role	Notes
2018	Bailando 2018	Contestant	15th place
2023	The Challenge Argentina: El Desafío	Contestant	12th place
2023	The Challenge: World Championship	Contestant with Jodi Weatherton	8th place
