= Emanuele Loperfido =

Italian politician (born 1975)

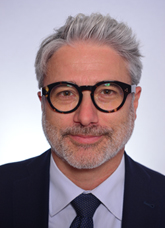
Emanuele Loperfido

Emanuele Loperfido (born 4 November 1975) is an Italian politician.

Loperfido is a native of Pordenone, born on 4 November 1975. Loperfido was elected to the Chamber of Deputies in the 2022 Italian general election, representing the Brothers of Italy.
