= Darío Lopérfido =

Argentine politician and journalist (1964–2026)

Dario Lopérfido
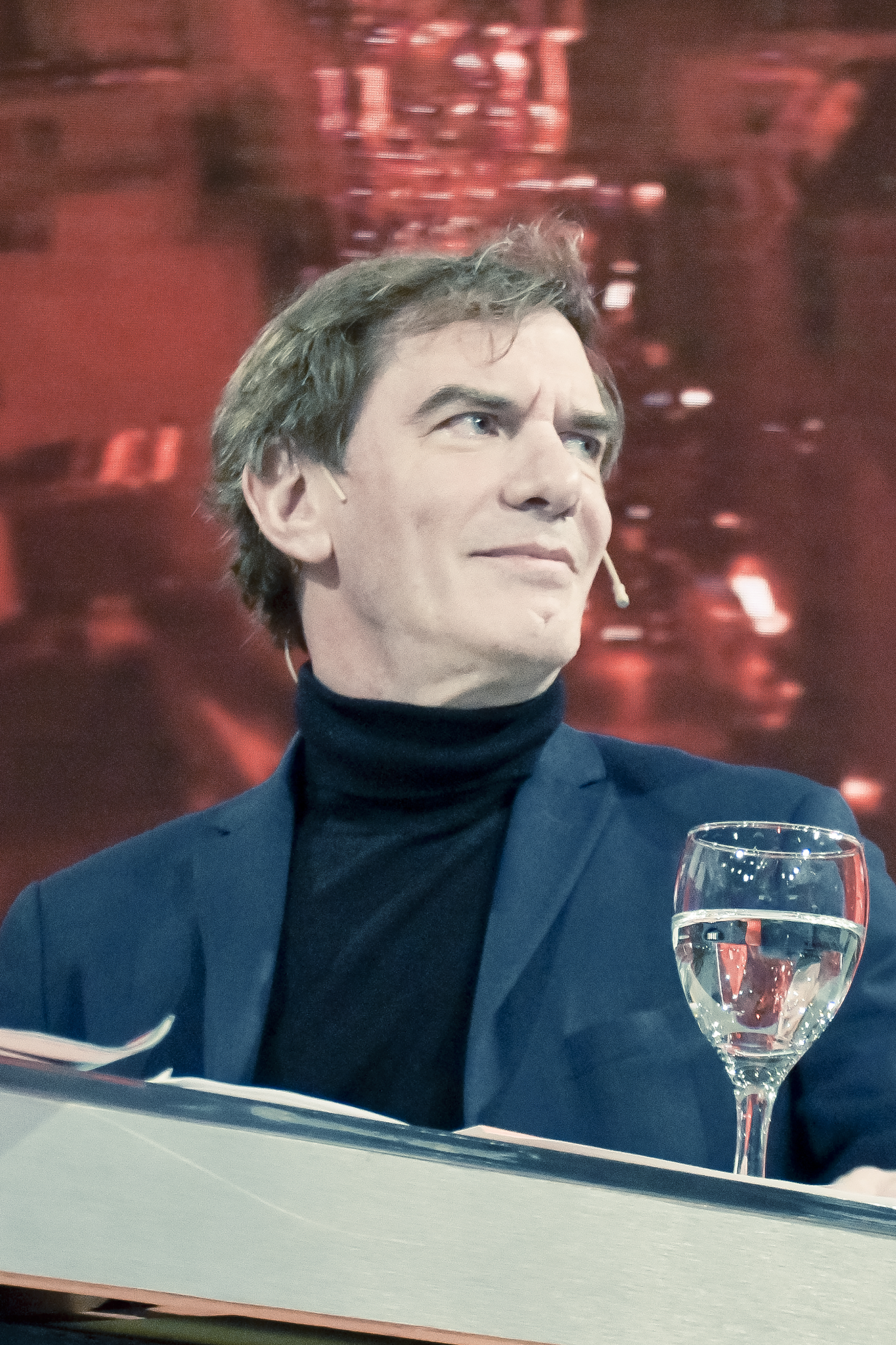
- Lopérfido in 2019

Minister of Culture of the City of Buenos Aires
- In office 10 December 2015 – 6 July 2016
- Preceded by: Hernán Lombardi
- Succeeded by: Ángel Mahler

General and artistic director of the Teatro Colón of Buenos Aires
- In office 1 February 2015 – 30 December 2015
- Preceded by: Pedro Pablo García Caffi
- Succeeded by: María Victoria Alcaraz

Personal details
- Born: 5 June 1964 Buenos Aires, Argentina
- Died: 27 February 2026 (aged 61) Madrid, Spain
- Cause of death: Amyotrophic lateral sclerosis
- Party: Radical Civic Union (until 2019)
- Spouse: Esmeralda Mitre (m. 2014; div. 2018)
- Children: 1

Darío Lopérfido (5 June 1964 – 27 February 2026) was an Argentine politician, cultural promoter and journalist who served as general and artistic director of Teatro Colón from February 2015 until his resignation in 2016.

== Life and career ==
Lopérfido was a consultant for Grupo PRISA in Madrid, Spain between 2002 and 2008. He was Argentina's Secretary of Culture and Communications between 1999 and 2001, Secretary of Culture of the Autonomous City of Buenos Aires between 1997 and 1999, and Subsecretary of Cultural Actions of Buenos Aires in 1996.

He also directed the Ricardo Rojas Cultural Center, dependant of Universidad de Buenos Aires between 1992 and 1999, and Festival Internacional de Buenos Aires in its 1997, 1999, 2011, and 2013 editions.

Lopérfido worked as a journalist specialized in arts and culture on Revista Teatro, and radio stations FM Rock & Pop and La Red between 1985 and 1989.

He wrote with co-author Alejandro Félix Capato the books Derechos Culturales en el Mercosur and Legislación Cultural en la Ciudad de Buenos Aires.

Lopérfido returned to politics in 2019 as pre-candidate as Buenos Aires City Mayor with the Mejorar party but later declined. He announced in early 2020 that he was planning to run for the next elections in 2021.

Lopérfido died in Madrid on 27 February 2026, at the age of 61, due to complications from amyotrophic lateral sclerosis (ALS), which had been diagnosed months before his death.
