= Oscar Palavecino =

Argentine folklore singer

Oscar Esperanza Palavecino (Palaviccini) is an Argentine folk singer also known as "El Chaqueño Palavecino."

== Childhood ==
Palavecino was born on 18 December 1959, in the town of "Rancho El Ñato" in the department of Rivadavia, in the Chaco region of the province of Salta. When he was nine, his mother Estela fell ill and his family moved to Tartagal, where they lived in his uncle's house. Palavecino worked multiple jobs during those years.

When Palavecino was 16, his mother died. Oscar took work selling gas cylinders before completing his mandatory military service in 1979. Upon his return to Salta, Palavecino became a truck driver. In 1983 he returned to Tartagal and began working as a bus driver; during this time, he began his interest in music.

== Musical career ==
Palavecino began performing Argentinean folk music at the folk club "Gauchos de Güemes." When he was 25 years old, he formed his first group, Pilcomayo Tres, with "El Negro" Gómez on violin, Elvio Condoríen on guitar, and Oscar on percussion. The group toured the north of Argentina until Gómez left the band and the trio disbanded. Palavecino formed a second group with Oscar Bazán on lead guitar, Don Lucas Cabral on bandoneon, Elías Balderrama on second guitar and Pascual Toledo on percussion.

Palavecino began recording his first cassette with the participation of Mauro Matos, a Buenos Aires violinist. Unable to afford the cost of production, the record remains unfinished. In 1987, he released his first finished cassette, Pa' mis abuelos esta zamba. A second cassette, Pa'l tío Pala, came in 1989.

In 2001 he released his best-known song, "La ley y la trampa" off the album of the same name. The album won a Premios Gardel award.

In 2008, Palavecino won a Latin Grammy Award.

== Discography ==
Since 1984, Palavecino has released over 25 albums, totaling approximately 600 songs.

Year	Title	Format	Label
1987	Pa' mis abuelos esta zamba	Cassette	
1989	Pal' tío Pala	Cassette	
1993	Por culpa de ser cantor	CD, DVD, vinyl	JAM
1995	El alma de Felipito	CD, DVD, vinyl	DBN
1996	Veinte éxitos del zorzal chacosalteño	CD, DVD, vinyl	DBN
1997	Salteño viejo	CD, DVD, vinyl	DBN
1998	Apenas cantor	CD, DVD, vinyl	DBN
1999	Chaqueñadas	CD, DVD, vinyl	DBN
2001	La ley y la trampa	CD, DVD, vinyl	DBN
2003	La pura verdad	CD, DVD, vinyl	DBN
2004	Juan de la calle	CD, DVD, vinyl	DBN
2004	De gira - En vivo	CD, DVD, vinyl	DBN
2005	20 grandes éxitos	CD, DVD, vinyl	DBN
2005	En vivo - Buenos Aires	CD, DVD, vinyl	DBN
2006	El gusto es mío	CD, DVD, vinyl	DBN
2006	El Chaqueño Palavecino y sus amigos	CD, DVD, vinyl	DBN
2007	Chaco escondido... Yo soy de allá	CD, DVD, vinyl	DBN
2008	Abrazando al caudillo	CD, DVD, vinyl	DBN
2009	La fiesta - En vivo (with Soledad Pastorutti and Los Nocheros)	CD, DVD, vinyl	Sony Music/Columbia
2010	25 años	CD, DVD, vinyl	DBN
2011	Mi cielo terrenal	CD, DVD, vinyl	DBN
2013	De pura cepa	CD, vinyl	DBN
2014	Pa' mi gente	CD, vinyl	DBN
2015	Recordando ayeres - En vivo	CD, vinyl	DBN
2016	De criollo a criollo	CD, vinyl	El Viejo Mistol
2017	33, falta envido y truco!	CD, vinyl	El Viejo Mistol
2019	Soy y seré Vol.1	CD, vinyl	El Viejo Mistol
2024	¿Quién me quita lo cantado?	CD, vinyl	Chaqueño Palavecino
