= Walter Olmos =

Argentine singer (1982–2002)

Walter Olmos (1982–2002) was an Argentine singer.

== Discography ==
- 2000 A Pura Sangre
- 2001 De Catamarca al mundo
- 2001 La Locomotora
- 2002 De Coleccion
