= Soledad Fandiño =

Argentine actress (born 1982)

- Born: 7 April 1982 (age 42); Buenos Aires, Argentina
- Occupation: Actress
- Years active: 2002–present
- Spouse: Residente (m. 2013; div. 2017)

Soledad Fandiño (born 7 April 1982) is an Argentine actress working primarily in television. She began her acting career by appearing in the television series Rebelde Way in 2003. In 2009, she transitioned to theatre, with a role in an adaptation of Alice in Wonderland.

== Career ==
=== Beginnings ===
Fandiño debuted as an actress in the television series Rebelde Way in 2003. She was subsequently cast as Felicitas in the family sitcom Ricos y Mocosos (2004–2005), which propelled her career and gained her best new actress nominations at the Martín Fierro Awards and Clarín Awards. For the next three years, she continued earning lead roles in family sitcoms and TV series produced by Pol-ka for Canal 13.

=== Theatre and television work ===
In 2009, Fandiño played the female lead in Teatro Astral's production of Lewis Carroll's Alice in Wonderland, directed by Alicia Zanca. Later that year, she performed the lead in the episode "El Manto Chino" of the sci-fi anthology series Dromo. In 2010, she landed a starring role opposite Rodrigo de la Serna in the sports telenovela Contra las cuerdas. In 2011, she worked with director Alberto Lecchi in the drama series Maltratadas, filmed in Uruguay, as a victim of domestic violence. She then returned to the stage for the play Ceremonia Secreta (2011), an adaptation of Marco Denevi's novel, directed by Oscar Barney Finn at the Margarita Xirgu theatre. This role earned her a nomination at the Florencio Sanchez Awards in 2012.

Later that year, Fandiño starred opposite Luis Machin in "Cuestión de Poder", an episode of the anthology series Televisión por la inclusión. In 2012, director Juan José Campanella featured her in the Calle 13 music video for "La Vuelta al Mundo". In 2013, she had a role in Telefe's comedy series Mi viejo verde.

== Personal life ==
Fandiño married René Pérez Joglar in January 2013 in a private ceremony in Puerto Rico. The couple divorced in 2017.

== Selected filmography ==
=== Screen ===
List of appearances, with year, title, and role shown
Year	Title	Role	Notes
2003	Rebelde Way	Consuelo	5 episodes
2004	No hay 2 sin 3	Various	58 episodes
2004	Stephanie	Stephanie	Film
2004–2005	Ricos y Mocosos	Felicitas Echegoyen	Nominated – Martin Fierro Awards for Best New Actress; Nominated – Clarin Awards for Best New Actress; Nominated – Martin Fierro Awards for Best Actress in a Comedy Series
2006	Juanita, la soltera	Juanita Ivanoff	106 episodes
2007	Son de Fierro	Sandy Fierro	211 episodes
2008–2009	Por amor a vos	Jazmín Sassone	173 episodes
2009	Dromo	Jesica	1 episode
2010	Todos contra Juan 2		8 episodes
2010–2011	Contra las cuerdas	Ana	60 episodes
2011	Televisión por la inclusión	Victoria	2 episodes
2011	Maltratadas	Alicia	2 episodes
2012	"La Vuelta al Mundo"		Calle 13 music video
2013	Mi viejo verde	Lucía	
2016	Educando a Nina	Lolita	9 episodes
2017	Yo soy así, Tita de Buenos Aires	Eva Duarte de Perón	Film
2017	Fanny la fan		19 episodes
2019	El Host	Caro	13 episodes
2019	Argentina, tierra de amor y venganza	Mecha Podestá	72 episodes
2021	100 días para enamorarnos	Rebeca Ávila	6 episodes

=== Stage ===
List of appearances, with year, title, theatre, and role shown
Year	Title	Theatre	Role	Notes
2009	Alicia en el país de las maravillas	Astral	Alicia	
2011	Ceremonia secreta	Margarita Xirgú	Cecilia	Nominated – Florencio Sanchez Award for Best New Actress
2011	Quedate a desayunar	Gira	Lucía	

== Awards and nominations ==
Year	Award	Category	Title of work	Result
2004	Martín Fierro Awards	Best New Actress	No hay 2 sin 3	Nominated
2004	Clarín Awards	Best New Actress	No hay 2 sin 3	Nominated
2005	Martín Fierro Awards	Best Actress in a Comedy Series	No hay 2 sin 3	Nominated
2011	Florencio Sanchez Awards	Best New Actress	Ceremonia Secreta	Nominated
