= LAM (TV program) =

- Genre: General Interest
- Directed by: Mariano Chihade
- Presented by: Ángel de Brito
- Starring: Conductor; Ángel de Brito; Panelists; Yanina Latorre; Nazarena Vélez; Marcela Feudale; Marixa Balli; Fernanda Iglesias; Matilda Blanco
- Country of origin: Argentina
- Original language: Spanish
- No. of seasons: 10

Production
- Production company: Mandarina Television

Original release
- Release: 2 May 2016 – present

Related
- El diario de Mariana; Showmatch

LAM (previously called Los Angeles de la Mañana) is an Argentine television program broadcast by América TV from Monday to Friday at 20:00 (UTC -3). It is led by Ángel de Brito.

It was broadcast between 2016 and 2021 by eltrece under the name Los Angeles de la Mañana, although it was always known by its acronym LAM. In 2022, after the unexpected end of the program in the channel's morning slot, América TV reached an agreement to broadcast the program, with LAM as the official name and broadcast from the 8:00 p.m. until 10:00 p.m.

== Synopsis ==
The cycle deals with current affairs, general interest and shows. It has the participation of columnists, guests, exclusive interviews and special reports.

== Team ==
Season
	Los ángeles de la mañana						LAM
	1 (2016)	2 (2017)	3 (2018)	4 (2019)	5 (2020)	6 (2021)	7 (2022)
Current
Ángel de Brito	Host						
Andrea Taboada	Panelist						
Yanina Latorre	Panelist						
Pía Shaw						Panelist	
Nazarena Vélez							Panelist
Estefanía Berardi							Panelist
Alejandro Castelo							Chronicler
Pepe Ochoa							Digital host
Previous
Carmela Bárbaro	Panelist						
Nequi Galotti	Panelist						
Mariela Anchipi	Panelist					Panelist	
Ana Rosenfeld							Panelist
Analía Franchín	Panelist						
Nancy Pazos	Panelist						
Noelia Antonelli	Panelist						
Miriam Lanzoni	Panelist						
Mercedes Marti	Panelist						
Mariana Brey		Panelist					
Laurita Fernández		Panelist				Host	
Lourdes Sánchez			Panelist				
Karina Iavícoli			Panelist				
Evelyn von Brocke			Panelist				
Florencia de la V			Panelist				
Graciela Alfano				Panelist			
Cinthia Fernández				Panelist			
Maite Peñoñori	Chronicler				Panelist		
Majo Martino					Panelist		
Martín Salwe		Chronicler					
Santiago Riva Roy			Chronicler				
Joaquín Álvarez						Host	

== Guests ==
- Carolina «Pampita» Ardohain
- Dalma Maradona
- Alejandro Fantino
- María Valenzuela
- Florencia Vigna
- Aníbal Pachano
- Lizardo Ponce
- Carmen Barbieri
- Marcela «Enana» Feudale
- Alfredo Casero
- Anamá Ferreyra
- Majo Martino
- Karina Jelinek
- Claudio Belocopitt
- Ramiro Bueno
- Amalia Granata
- Analía Franchín
- Diego Maradona Jr.
- Augusto Tartúfoli
- Gimena Accardi
- Darío Barassi
- Graciela Alfano
- Ana Laura Román
- Mariana Fabbiani
- Jacobo Winograd
- Denise Dumas
- María Fernanda Callejón
- Laura Ubfal
- Agustín «Cachete» Sierra
- Luciana Peker
- Raquel Hermida Leyenda
- Alejandra Malem
- Fernando Burlando
- Florencia de la V
- Fabián Medina Flores
- Ximena Capristo
- Rocío Moreno
- Oscar Mediavilla
- Morena Rial
- Matilda Blanco
- Benjamín Rojas
- Martín Cirio «La Faraona»
- Laurita Fernández
- Ronen Szwarc
- Mar Tarrés
- Bárbara Vélez
- Fernanado Burlando
- Carlos Perciavalle
- Gladys «La Bomba Tucumana»
- Iliana Calabro
- Cristian U.
- Gabriel Usandivaras
- Luis Ventura
- Tamara Paganini
- Leo Alturria
- Victoria Vanucci
- Marina Calabró
- Beto Casella
- Marcela Baños
- Victoria Vanucci
- Martina «Tini» Stoessel
- Mariela «La Chipi» Anchipi
- Lali Espósito
- María Laura Santillán
- Daniela Cardone
- Lola Latorre
- Carolina Baldini
- Fernando Dente
- Mauricio D'Alessandro
- Nora Briozzo
- Fátima Flórez
- Leo Sbaraglia
- Karina «La Princesita» Tejeda
- Arturo Puig
- Roberto Castillo
- Ernestina Pais
- Ana Rosenfeld
- Natalie Weber
- Candela Ruggeri
- Wanda Nara
- Roberto García Moritán
- Juan Otero
- Sofía «Jujuy» Jiménez
- Kate Rodríguez
- Agustín Barajas Urquiza
- Hernán Piquín
- Lourdes Sánchez
- Pitty «The Numerologist»
- Martin Baclini
- Ángela Leiva
- Patricia Sosa
- Nicolás Vázquez
- Connie Ansaldi
- Nancy Duré
- Rocío Marengo
- Leonor Viale
- Martha Fort
- Leandro Penna
- Silvina Escudero
- Evelyn Scheidl
- Maximiliano «Chanchi» Estévez
- Nicolas Maiquez
- Luli Fernández
- Cinthia Fernández
- Carolina Molinari
- Dani La Chepi
- Rocío Oliva
- Mariana Brey
- Bárbara Franco
- Celeste Muriega
- Pablo Ruiz
- Paula Varela
- Belu Lucius
- Mónica Farro
- Carolina Oltra
- La Barby
- Facundo Mazzei
- Gonzalo Heredia
- Maite Peñoñori
- Dady Brieva
- Flor de la V
- Marcela Tinayre
- Bárbara Silenzi
- Noelia Marzol

== Awards and nominations ==
List of awards and nominations
Year	Prize	Category	Prize	Result	Ref.
2016	Tato Awards	Best show program	LAM	Nominated	
2016	Tato Awards	Mejor panelista	Yanina Latorre	Nominated	
2017	Notirey prize	Mejor panelista	Yanina Latorre	Nominated	
2017	Premios Tato	Best show program	LAM	Nominated	
2019	Most Clicked Awards	Most clicked program	LAM	Won	
2021	Martín Fierro 2022	Best panelist	Yanina Latorre	Nominated	

== See also ==
- América TV
- El diario de Mariana
- eltrece
