= MasterChef Argentina =

- Genre: Baking, cooking
- Created by: Franc Roddam
- Directed by: Claudio Cuscuela
- Presented by: Mariano Peluffo (2014-2016); Santiago del Moro (2020-2023); Wanda Nara (2023-2026)
- Judges: Donato de Santis; German Martitegui; Damián Betular
- Voices of: Claudia Fasolo
- Country of origin: Argentina
- Original language: Spanish
- No. of seasons: 5
- No. of episodes: 31

Production
- Executive producers: Gustavo N. Perednik (1st season); Nicolas Malowicki (2nd season)
- Producer: Diego Guebel
- Production location: Buenos Aires
- Running time: 90 minutes (week); 120 minutes (sunday)
- Production companies: BoxfishTV; Telefe

Original release
- Network: Telefe; Discovery Home & Health
- Release: 6 April 2014 – 7 August 2023

Related
- MasterChef Celebrity Argentina

MasterChef Argentina is an Argentine gastronomy reality show contest produced by Boxfish TV for Telefe. It is the main national variant of the television program and franchise MasterChef.

== Overview ==
The program has five seasons, the first of which premiered on April 6, 2014. The first five seasons (three traditional and two children's) were hosted by Mariano Peluffo, with a judging panel consisting of Donato De Santis, Germán Martitegui, and Christophe Krywonis.

In 2020, MasterChef Celebrity Argentina premiered, hosted by Santiago del Moro and featuring the same judging panel, with the exception of Krywonis, who was replaced by Damián Betular.

Since 2023, Wanda Nara has replaced Santiago del Moro as host.

== Production ==
The filming of the Argentine version of MasterChef takes place at the Telefe studios. The entire season is filmed at this studio.

== Prizes ==
The winner receives the title of MasterChef, a cash prize (250,000 pesos ars in the first season, 350,000 pesos in the second, 1,200,000 in MasterChef Celebrity and 10,000,000 pesos in the third season) and the publication of a cookbook of their own creation, in addition to a one-year scholarship at the Mausi Sebess International Institute of Culinary Arts.

== Format ==
The tests that the participants will have to face are:

- Mystery box (initial test): the contestants will receive one or more ingredients that they must use in the dish to be cooked in some way, either in their own style or following the instructions or advice given by the jury. The two best dishes will be the captains of the next test. The best applicant will be rewarded in some way, usually with privileges such as not being expelled from that program or some advantage for subsequent tests.
- Creative challenge (initial test): the applicants will be limited to using a few ingredients, and with them they must cook the dish they decide on, trying to ensure that the proposed ingredients combine properly.
- Pressure test (initial test): the toughest test. An important star of the kitchen will visit the program, will show them one of his creations and they will have to reproduce it as faithfully as possible following the instructions and steps of the master.
- Team test: the contestants are divided into two teams, red and blue, choosing the captain of each of the members and the menu to cook among several exposed, starting the best of the initial test. The contestants must cook in an organized way to get all the dishes out on time.
- Elimination test: the team or contestants that have done the best in the previous test will be exempt from this test. The rest must cook the recipe indicated by the jury. They will "deliberate" and whoever has made the "worst" dish will leave the program.

Only one of the three initial test variations is performed in each program. All tests have a time limit established by the jury, and before starting the applicants have three minutes to stock up on ingredients from the "supermarket", except in the team test.

== Seasons ==
Season	Winner	Runner-up	Number of finalists	Finalists ordered chronologically according to their elimination	Start date
1	Elba Rodríguez	Pablo Fekete	16	María José Poretta, Federico Silva, Roberto Ríos, Óscar "Coto" Fernández, Ángela Raad, Mohamed Alaa, Gaia Bidin, María Sol Bazzolo, María Luján Martínez, Juan Fernández, Jo Johannes, Laureano Driussi, Laura Vides, Natalie Neuberger	2014
2	Alejo Lagouarde	Martín Matroni	20	Julita del Cogliano, Diego Ávila, Claudia Ortiz, Simone Caregnato, Sol Wei, Juan Pablo Rote, Mariana Lacroze, Matías Cederbojm, Nadia Andrada, Patricia Zacarías, Julia Nocquet, Lía Cigliutti, Sebastián Ablín, Francisco Taverna, María Karapetyan, Alan Disavia, Jacinto Echandía, Mercedes Elaskar	2015
3	Rodolfo Vera Calderón	Estefanía Herlein	16	Emilio Falbo, Micaela Bosio, Carlos Alzamora, Agustín Sampietro, Delfina Gayoso, Juan Ignacio Feibelmann, Candelaria Sorini, Juan Francisco Moro, María Sol Ferrero, Silvana Díaz, Aquiles González Sviatschi, Daniela Kompel, Antonio López, Rodrigo Salcedo	2023

== MasterChef editions ==
Edition	Year	Winner	Runner-up
MasterChef	2014	ARG Elba Rodríguez	ARG Pablo Fekete
MasterChef 2. season	2015	ARG Alejo Lagouarde	ARG Martín Matroni
MasterChef 3. season	2023	MEX Rodolfo Vera Calderón	ARG Estefanía Herlein

== MasterChef Junior Editions ==
Edition	Year	Winner	Runner-up
MasterChef Junior	2015	ARG María Sassola	ARG Lucas Di Giacomo
MasterChef Junior 2	2015 - 2016	Spain Sebastián Flores	ARG Uziel Tarascona
