= Quizás =

Quizás may refer to:

== Albums ==
- Quizás (album), a 2002 album by Enrique Iglesias

== Songs ==
- "Quizás, Quizás, Quizás", written by Osvaldo Farrés and covered by Nat King Cole, Chaquito, Ibrahim Ferrer, Jeff Harnar, Anaïs Croze, and Florent Pagny
- "Quizás" (Enrique Iglesias song), title track of the 2002 album
- "Quizás", single by Mari Trini, composed M. Trini 1972
- "Quizás", song by Milly Quezada, composed Gustavo Marquez, from 22 Ultimate Merengue Hits 2002 and Serie Azul Tropical 2003
- "Quizás", song by N'Klabe, composed Hector Torres from I Love Salsa! 2005
- "Quizás", song by Naela (es:Quizás (canción de Naela))
- "Quizás", song by Toby Love and Yuridia (es:Quizás (canción de Toby Love))
- "Quizás", song by Tony Dize on the album Los Vaqueros
- "Quizás" (Rich Music, Sech, and Dalex song), from the EP The Academy
