= Pablo Ruiz =

Pablo Ruiz may refer to:

- Pablo Ruiz (singer) (born 1975)
  - Pablo Ruiz (album), a 1985 album by Pablo Ruiz
- Pablo Ruiz (footballer, born 1981), Spanish footballer
- Pablo Ruiz (footballer, born 1987), Argentine footballer
- Pablo Ruiz (footballer, born 1998), Argentine footballer
- Pablo Ruiz Picasso (also known simply as Pablo Picasso), Spanish painter
- Pablo Llamas Ruiz (born 2002), Spanish tennis player
