= Ángel de Brito =

Argentine journalist (born 1976)

- Born: Ángel Alberto de Brito; 1 July 1976 (age 49); Buenos Aires, Argentina
- Spouse: Javier Medina (m. 2019)

Ángel Alberto de Brito (born 1 July 1976) is an Argentine journalist and radio and television presenter specialized in fashion and entertainment.

== Early life and career ==
Ángel de Brito was born in Buenos Aires on 1 July 1976. Before getting into entertainment journalism, he pursued a career and graduated as an English teacher, also working as a private teacher and university professor. De Brito started working in print media and radio stations in 1999. He began on TV programs two years later, in 2001, by covering the Martín Fierro Awards and presenting a show about Argentine telenovelas for Israeli viewers along with fellow journalist Laura Ubfal.

De Brito's breakthrough job on TV came in 2003 when he was asked to join a paparazzi show presented by journalist Viviana Canosa on El Nueve. He remained working there until 2010, when he decided to resign. In 2005, and again in 2006, de Brito was the main presenter of the Martín Fierro Awards along with Marisa Brel and Mirtha Legrand, respectively.

In radio, he has worked with numerous journalists, including Luis Majul and Gustavo Sylvestre, and continued during the early 2010s working with other TV presenters like Alejandro Fantino and Pamela David. In 2012, de Brito settled in Uruguay to work there in a TV show about entertainment hosted by Uruguayan actresses Patricia Wolf and Eunice Castro.

== Career since the early 2010s ==
De Brito is known for his role as a juror in several singing and dancing shows, including Soñando por Bailar and Bailando por un Sueño hosted by Marcelo Tinelli. After this string of participations in these shows, de Brito returned to journalism, working with Santiago del Moro in Intratables. In 2021, he resurfaced in artistic programs, co-hosting a singing show with Laurita Fernández.

Since 2016, de Brito has been the main presenter of LAM, his own entertainment journalistic show. In 2019 he returned to radio with a program on CNN Radio Argentina, where he remained until resigning in 2021.

== Personal life ==
De Brito is openly gay and married his partner Javier Medina in June 2019.
