= Renacer =

Renacer may refer to:

- Renacer (Dark Latin Groove album), 2007
- Renacer (Naëla album), 2016
- Renacer (Pablo Ruiz album), 2010
- Renacer (Senses Fail album) or the title song, 2013
- Renacer... Homenaje a Lucha Villa, an album by Ana Gabriel, 2009
- "Renacer" (song), by Gloria Estefan, 1990
