= Laurita Fernández =

Argentine TV host and actress

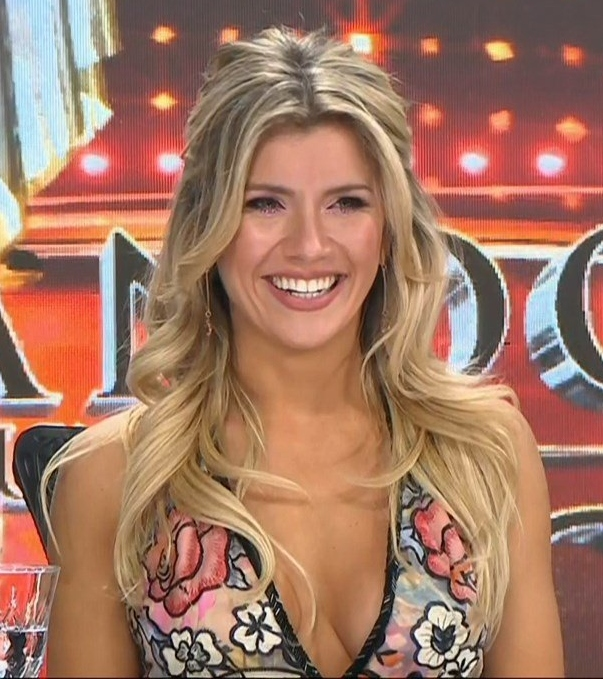
- Born: Laura Inés Fernández; 18 December 1990 (age 35); Buenos Aires, Argentina
- Occupations: Dancer; choreographer; TV host; model; actress
- Years active: 2010–present

Laura Inés Fernández (born 18 December 1990) is an Argentine dancer, choreographer, TV host, model and actress. She is known for her participation in Showmatch: Bailando por un sueño, for hosting the youth program Combate, and being the best host alongside Ángel de Brito in the reality show program Cantando 2020.

== Biography ==
She was born and raised in the neighborhood of Mataderos, Buenos Aires, in a house on Fonrouge and Alberdi, together with her parents, Carlos Fernández and Inés Stork Banquer, and her younger sister, Gabriela. After their separation, she went to live with her mother in Liniers.

=== Acting career ===
In 2010 she had a participation in the opening dance of the film Igualita a mí where she kisses the character of Adrián Suar as a teenager.

In 2012 she was selected for the youth series Violetta, but shortly after she was released. She later revealed that she got fired for working on Showmatch.

She made her theater debut in the summer of 2015, in the play Ghost House alongside Pedro Alfonso, Emilio Disi, Luciana Salazar, Freddy Villarreal, Benjamín Amadeo, Lizy Tagliani and Lourdes Sánchez. She also starred in the children's play Zooigico. in 2016.

In the summer of 2016 she worked on the play Enredados (Tangled) together with Florencia de la V, Osvaldo Laport, Iliana Calabró, Federico Bal, Sebastián Almada, Bárbara Vélez and Ailen Bechara. She also starred in the children's play Tierra de Oz.

She got a secondary role in the daily strip Quiero vivir a tu lado, where his character interferes with Darío Barassi and Jimena Barón.

In 2018 she became the replacement for Griselda Siciliani in the play Sugar, together with Nicolás Cabré and Federico D'Elía, and signed a contract for the theatrical season, together with him and Victorio D'Alessandro.

In 2018, she was the winner as female revelation of the ACE award, the most important theater award in Argentina, for her leading role in Sugar.

From 2019 to 2020 she stars in the theater Departamento de Bachelor, along with Nicolás Cabré, Martin Seefeld and a great cast. Role that gave her her second ACE Award nomination for Best Actress in a Comedy.

=== Career ===
In 2010 she made her debut on the reality program dance competition Bailando por un sueño in a role of dancer, accompanying Matías Alé.

From 2011 to 2012 she was Federico Baldino's dancer, a participant in Soñando por bailar, who wanted to participate in Bailando por un sueño. They managed to reach the semifinals but Magdalena Bravi won them.

She later participated in Bailando 2012, taking on the role of dancer for former Gran Hermano media star Cristian U., with whom she obtained 11th place after five months of competition.

In 2014 she again participated in the Bailando, this time as a dancer for the renowned director Aníbal Pachano, with whom she obtained ninth place after seven months of competition. In turn, she was called to be the choreographer for the green and red teams in the new youth program, Combate.

In 2015 she participated in the Bailando 10 años, where his partner was the actor Federico Bal. After seven months of competition they manage to be crowned champions; in turn began to gain more popularity. In Combate she assumed a new role as captain of the green team together with the singer el Polaco, and later together with the athlete Federico Molinari.

She left the play Tangled to join the leadership of Combate evolution, along with Thiago Batistuta and El Pollo Álvarez. She participated, this time as a figure, in Bailando 2016 where his partner was again Federico Bal and, after seven months of program, they were eliminated in the semifinals by Polaco and Barby Silenzi. She also starred in the children's play Land of Oz.

In 2017, she joined the LAM program as a temporary panelist. She participated in Bailando 2017, where his partner was again Federico Bal and, after seven months of the program, they were runners-up, losing by the actress Flor Vigna.

She also debuted on the radio with his own program Dale que vale! on the frequency Vale 97.5.

She assumed an important role and became a jury member of Bailando 2018 together with the journalist Ángel de Brito, the actress Florencia Peña and the journalist Marcelo Polino.

In 2019, she was able to travel to Mexico to participate as a guest judge on Pequeños Gigantes, a talent reality show on the Las Estrellas network.

In addition, in the summer she hosted a radio program on CNN Radio Argentina. She later launched his own web show, Jagalau, through his Instagram.

In July 2020, she took on the role of host of Cantando por un sueño, along with Ángel de Brito, in her biggest hosting project to date, broadcast by eltrece.

On January 25, 2021, she temporarily assumed leadership of LAM, replacing Ángel de Brito, who was in isolation after contact with a person with COVID-19.

== Filmography ==
=== Cinema ===
Year	Title	Role
2010	Igualita a mí	Herself
2022	Granizo	Mery Oliva

=== TV ===
Programs & realitys
Year	Title	Role	Notes
2010	Showmatch: Bailando 2010	Participant (with Matías Ale)	21.º eliminated
2011–12	Soñando por bailar 2	Participant (with Federico Baldino)	Semi-finalists
2012	Showmatch: Bailando 2012	Participant (with Cristian Urrizaga)	16.º eliminated
2014	Showmatch: Bailando 2014	Participant (with Aníbal Pachano)	19.º eliminated
2014–18	Combate	Coach Captain (Green Team) Host	_{Seasons 1–2 Seasons 4–5 Seasons 7 –13}
2015–17	Showmatch: Bailando	Participant	Winner _{(Season 10)}
2015–17	Showmatch: Bailando	Participant	Semi-finalists _{(Season 11)}
2015–17	Showmatch: Bailando	Participant	Runner-up _{(Season 12)}
2017	LAM	Panelist	
2017	Vernucci Moda 2017	Host	Event
2018	Showmatch: Bailando 2018	Judge	
2019	Pequeños gigantes	Judge	Special guest
2019	Susana Giménez: Pequeños gigantes	Judge	Special guest
2019	Cortá por Lozano	Replacement host	
2019	Premios Hugo al Teatro Musical 2019	Host	Event
2020–21	Cantando 2020	Host	
2021	El club de las divorciadas	Host	
2021	Nosotros a la mañana	Replacement host	
2021	LAM	Replacement host	
2021	Un sol para los chicos	Host	Event
2021	Produ Awards 2021	Co-host	Event
2021	Bailando 2021	Special guest	On the episode N°115
2022–present	Bienvenidos a bordo	Host	
2023	¿Quién es la máscara? Uruguay	Participant	6.° eliminated

Fictions
Year	Title	Role	Notes
2017	Quiero vivir a tu lado	Fernanda «La Ferchu»	Recurring role
2018	Mirtha, 50 años	Mirtha Legrand (on 1989)	Sketch for La noche de Mirtha
2019	Inconvivencia	Carolina Venzo	Protagonista
2020	Los internacionales	Valeria	Participación especial
2021	El día del debut	Receptionist	Sketch for Bailando 2021
2022	Los protectores	Paula Podestá	Main cast

Advertisements
Year	Brand	Product	Notes	Ref.
2021	Naldo	Home appliances	Christmas commercial	

=== Theater ===
Year	Title	Role
2012 - 2013	Nada es imposible	Eli
2014 - 2015	Casa fantasma	Abril
2015	Zooilógico	Srta. Laurita
2015 - 2016	Tangled	Brenda (previously Delfina)
2016	Tierra de Oz	Emma
2018 - 2019	Sugar	Sugar Kane
2019 - 2020	Departamento de soltero	Srta. Betty López

=== Radio ===
Year	Title	Role	Estation
2017 - 2018	¡Dale que vale!	Host	Vale 97.5
2020	CNN Verano, Playa, Show	Host	CNN Radio

== Awards and nominations ==
Awards	Category	Work	Result
Premios VOS de 2015	Summer girl	Casa Fantasma	Nominated
Premios Los Más Clickeados 2015	Celebrities with the Most Rating on the Internet	Herself	Won
Premios Los Más Clickeados 2016	Celebrities with the Most Rating on the Internet	Herself	Won
Premios Carlos 2016	Best Supporting Actress	Tangled	Nominated
Premios Los Más Clickeados 2017	Celebrities with the Most Rating on the Internet	Herself	Won
Premios Martín Fierro Digital 2017	Most influential tweeter	Herself	Nominated
Premios Los Más Clickeados 2018	Celebrities with the Most Rating on the Internet	Herself	Won
Premios Los Más Clickeados 2018	Most Clicked Celebrity Gold	Herself	Won
Fans Awards 2018	The goddess	Herself	Nominated
Premios Notirey 2018	Female hosting	Combate	Nominated
Premios Notirey 2018	Leading Actress in a Musical	Sugar	Won
Premios ACE 2018	Female revelation	Sugar	Won
Premios Estrella de Mar 2019	Female revelation	Sugar	Nominated
Premios ACE 2019	Comedy Leading Actress	Bachelor department	Nominated
Premios Los Más Clickeados 2019	Celebrities with the Most Rating on the Internet	Herself	Won
