= Naëla (album) =

Studio album by Naëla
- Released: November 19, 2011
- Recorded: 2009–2010
- Genre: Pop rock
- Length: 36:41
- Label: The Light Entertainment
- Producer: Mauricio Rivera, Carlos Agüera

Naëla chronology
Naëla (2011)	Imparable (2013)

Singles from Naëla
- 1. "No Quiero Estar Sin Ti" Released: February 6, 2010; 2. "Muero Por Amarte" Released: March 21, 2011; 3. "Esta Noche Mando Yo" Released: September 11, 2011; 4. "Por Tu Amor" Released: February 16, 2012

Naëla is the debut studio album of Colombian recording artist Naëla, released on November 19, 2011. In 2009, Hernan Orjuela became in her manager. She made her debut performance in 2010 in Colombian TV Show "Sábados Felices" performing her first single No Quiero Estar Sin Ti.

Three singles has been released from the album, with "No Quiero Estar Sin Ti" becoming a success in the Spanish speaking world. The album has been promoted with several appearances on live television, and also by the Camila's Dejarte de Amar Tour in 2011 counting with a big successful.

== Promotion ==
=== Singles ===
- "No Quiero Estar Sin Ti" was released as Naëla' debut single on February 16, 2010, when she was only 19 years old. The song received generally favorable reviews from contemporary critics, who mostly praised its composition. "No Quiero Estar Sin Ti" was written by Naëla.
- "Muero Por Amarte"" was released as Naëla' second single on March 21, 2011. "Muero Por Amarte" was written by Naëla.
- "Esta Noche Mando Yo" " was released as Naëla' third single on September 11, 2011 featuring Obie-P. "Muero Por Amarte" was written and produced by Naëla and Obie-P.
- "Por Tu Amor" was confirmed as the fourth single of the album. It was released as Naëla's fourth single on February 16, 2012 in its solo version. The single's featuring version was released on April 22, 2012 duet with rap group Tres Coronas singer P.N.O.

== Track listing ==
No.	Title	Writer(s)	Length
1.	"No Quiero Estar Sin Ti"	Nataly Rivera	3:18
2.	"Muero Por Amarte"	Nataly Rivera	3:45
3.	""Por Tu Amor""	Nataly Rivera	3:51
4.	"Esta Noche Mando Yo" (featuring Obie-P)	Nataly Rivera, Obie-P	3:04
5.	"Este Cuento"	Nataly Rivera	3:43
6.	"Hoy"	Nataly Rivera	3:40
7.	"Sobrevivir"	Nataly Rivera	3:48
8.	"Antes De Morir"	Nataly Rivera	3:23
9.	"Dia De Mierda"	Nataly Rivera	2:42
10.	"El Amor Que Me Das"	Nataly Rivera	1:54
11.	"Di Que Vas A Hacer"	Nataly Rivera	4:14
