= Naëla =

- Born: Nataly Rivera; Bogotá, Colombia
- Genres: Pop; pop rock
- Occupations: Author; singer-songwriter; musician
- Instruments: Vocals; guitar
- Years active: 2009–present
- Labels: My Major Company; The Light Entertainment; Universal Music
- Website: naela.co

Nataly Rivera, better known as Naëla, is a Colombian singer, author and songwriter. She made her music debut as the opening act in the show that Mexican group Camila gave in Bogotá in 2010. Followed this, she released her debut single No Quiero Estar Sin Ti belongs to her debut album Naëla. In 2011, she released two new single of her album, Esta Noche Mando Yo and Muero Por Amarte.

== Career ==
=== 2009–2010: Musical debut ===
Naëla made her music debut on December 10, 2009, in a showcase made in Bogotá, in the Hard Rock Cafe's place; in front of more than 300 guests among whom were journalists, entrepreneurs, media, her family and friends.

On February 16, 2010, she released her first single named No Quiero Estar Sin Ti from her debut album, counting with a great success; success that led her to be part of different projects among which stands out her special appearance in the Canal Caracol's TV Production Tierra De Cantores in 2010. Besides, she was one of the invited artists in the premiere of the Canal RCN' Serie La Pola performing her song No Quiero Estar Sin Ti and let her to be the winning at Dj TV Awards 2010 in the category for Best Female National Artist.

=== 2011: Next singles, success and debut album ===
On March 21, 2011, she released her second single, Muero Por Amarte, the music video was released on March 22, 2011, and was directed by Leo Carreño and currently it has 34.735 plays in YouTube. The single was produced in several editions (Electro Soka, Club Dance, Balada Pop and others) and has reached #9 in National Latin Top 20.

She was invited to be part of the Commemoration of El Tiempo's Newspaper with other artists as Jorge Celedón.

On May 11, 2011, Naëla was the selected artist to be the opening act of Mexican group Camila in their show in Bogotá. In addition to performing some of her own songs, she performed her version of the song Equivocada originally performed by Mexican singer Thalía.

With her show as the opening act of Camila, Naëla reached #1 in National Top 10 with important artists as Enrique Iglesias, Camila, Luis Fonsi and others.

On September 11, 2011, Naëla released her third single named Esta Noche Mando Yo duet with singer Obie-P. With this single, Naëla reached #9 in National Latino Top 30 made by National Report. A weeks later, the single Esta Noche Mando Yo reached #5 in National Latino in the Week #43. On September 11, the audio video was released in her official YouTube's Channel. The official music video will be released in 2012.

On November 19, Naëla released her debut album named Naëla with 11 songs includes her fourth first singles written and produced by herself alongside Mauricio Rivera and Carlos Agüera.

=== 2012–2014: International success ===
On January, Naëla was invited by singer Franco De Vita to perform his hit Tan Sólo Tú (originally singing duet with Alejandra Guzmán. With her third single Esta Noche Mando Yo, Naëla gets into the Ecuador's radio stations becoming a hit. In her native radio stations (Colombia) Naëla gets into the best 10 songs. Months later Naëla released her fourth single Por Tu Amor in a new version (urban) exclusive for promotion duet with Tres Coronas vocal lead P.N.O. The music video was directed by Pipe Orjuela between cities Bogotá and Ibagué and was released in her YouTube channel on May 16, 2012, reaching the top of the radio video channels.

Thanks to the success of Por Tu Amor Naëla was invited by RCN TV to make a special appearance in the reality show Protagonistas de Nuestra Tele where she performed her hit Esta Noche Mando Yo.

Likewise, Naëla was invited by Caracol TV to be jury in the TV program Sábados Felices. Sunday April 26, was invited to be part of the XXXIV walk Colombia solidarity supporting the campaign Al Paso Con Los Valores

Thanks to the success in her music career, Naëla was nominated for second in the Shock Award in Colombia to Best New Solo Artist with her single Esta Noche Mando Yo competing with La Bermúdez, Duina del Mar, Rakel and Riva.

On September 6, 2012, Naëla released the first single of her upcoming studio album which is going to be released in 2013. Falso Amor. Falso Amor was written and produced by Naëla together with producer White Shark and her brother, singer and songwriter Mauricio Rivera. The music video was released on October 29, 2012, and was directed by Pipe Orjuela and co-directed by herself.

"This song is born thinking women who have experienced a false love, you were able to overcome it and still couldn't forget"

— Naëla talks about her new single Falso Amor.

Naëla started a promotional tour of her single Falso Amor in different media of press, radio and TV and making some shows in bars, charity concerts and others. Her second album is expected for released in March 2013.

On April 21, 2013, Naëla confirmed in her official Twitter page that she would be part of the showcase and previous conferences of Billboard Latin Music Awards' meetings to be held on April 25, 2013, in Miami, Florida with Carlos Vives, Alejandra Guzmán, Gloria Estefan, Sebastián Yepes, Kany García, Carla Morrison, Olga Tañón, Beatriz Luengo, Mauricio Rivera, and other artists.

She released her single Sin Mirar Atrás, as the second single from her second studio album, Imparable produced by Luis Fernando Ochoa, famous for making hits for Shakira.

She released her single Quizas, as her first single released exclusively in Spain. The single was premiered on July 1 at Cadena Dial and on September 18, she confirmed the song Besar El Cielo as the next single of the album.

She was selected by Carlos Vives as his opening act in Madrid and Barcelona in October during his Corazón Profundo Tour.

In May 2014 she twice participated in the Evento 40 made by the Colombian radio station Los 40 Principales, where she sang songs of her album Imparable. On September 8, she released her new single, a cover of "Bazar", originally sung by Mexican girl group Flans. On September 22, 2014, she released digitally her first remix album The Remixes, which featured remixes of her second album' songs.

She was nominated for Premios 40 America by the radio station Los 40 Principales in Argentina for Best Artist or Group of Colombia alongside Piso 21, Carlos Vives, Maluma and Alkilados, being Naela the only Colombian female artist nominated in these awards.

=== 2015–present: New studio album ===
On March 3, Naela was invited by the King of Spain Felipe VI of Spain and Queen Letizia of Spain at a special dinner held at the Royal Palace of Madrid where were also invited the current President of Colombia Juan Manuel Santos and his wife María Clemencia Rodríguez Múnera, footballers James Rodríguez and Carlos Bacca, and Colombian actress Juana Acosta.

Since the beginning of 2015, she announced details of her new album studio album in her social networks using the hashtag #RenacerNaela confirming that her third studio album will be named Renacer (Naëla album). oN May 29, she announced on her official websites the name of the first single off her third album, which is called «Cada Momento» and it will be released on June 9 on the web and digital stores. The music video of the single was released the same day on her official YouTube channel and already has over 100.000 views.

On July 31, 2015, she announced her participation at KeBuena Summer Festival of the Spanish radio station KeBuena in Spanin alongside other artists such as: Keymass & Bonche, Two Tone, Adrián Rodríguez, Rasel, and others.

On December 4, to commemorate the death anniversary No. 35 of the singer and former member of the successful British rock band, The Beatles, John Lennon, she joined Spanish singer Bely Basarte to perform an acoustic cover of the hit single «Imagine» off the album with the same name. The cover song has more than 28.300 views in the Spanish singer official YouTube channel gained positive commentaries.

In late February, Naela began publishing on her websites, promotional teasers of her third studio album Renacer with videos denoting: FEELING, PERCEPTION and MATERIALITY.

== Discography ==
- Naëla (2011)
- Imparable (2014)
- Renacer (2016)

== Concert tours ==
Opening act

- Camila – "Dejarte de Amar Tour" (2011)
- Carlos Vives - "Corazón Profundo Tour" (2013)

== Awards and nominations ==
=== Premios Dj Tv ===
| Year | Nominee / work | Award | Result |
|---|---|---|---|
| 2011 | "No Quiero Estar Sin Ti" | Best Solo Femme Pop Artist | Won |

=== Premios Shock ===
| Year | Nominee / work | Award | Result |
|---|---|---|---|
| 2011 | "Muero Por Amarte" | Best National Solo Femme Pop Artist | Nominated |
| 2012 | "Esta Noche Mando Yo" | Best New Solo Artist Pop | Nominated |

== Premios Mi Gente ==
| Year | Nominee / work | Award | Result |
|---|---|---|---|
| 2011 | Herself | Best Female Artist | Nominated |
