= Aire (Pablo Ruiz album) =

Studio album by Pablo Ruiz
- Released: January 21, 1997
- Recorded: 1996–97
- Genre: Pop
- Language: Spanish
- Label: Sony Music
- Producer: David Santisteban

Pablo Ruiz chronology
60/90 (1994)	Aire (1997)	Was it something that I didn't say? (1999)

Aire (Spanish: Air) is the seventh studio album by the Argentine singer Pablo Ruiz. It was released on January 21, 1997.

== Track list ==
1. Aire – 4:51
2. Lola
3. Te Quiero Junto A Mi
4. La Mar De Tu Piel
5. Morir De Pie
6. Amando, Amando
7. A Flor De Piel
8. Cuerpo A Cuerpo
9. El Viento Me Llevo A Tu Corazón
10. Regressa A Mi Corazón
11. Gota A Gota
12. Lola (Remix version) (Bonus track)
