= CNN Radio Argentina =

Radio station in Buenos Aires, Argentina

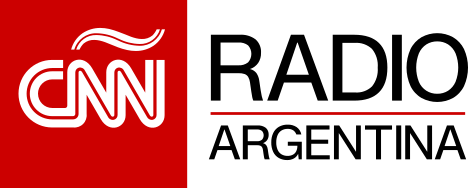
- Buenos Aires; Argentina
- Broadcast area: Buenos Aires
- Frequencies: AMBA: 950 kHz Repeaters: Province of Buenos Aires; La Plata: 100.9 FM; Bahía Blanca: 96.3 FM; Balcarce: 95.3 FM; Junín: 107.3 FM; Mar Del Plata: 88.3 FM; Miramar: 98.1 FM; Necochea: 104.7 FM; Pinamar: 102.3 FM; Villa Gesell: 101.7 FM; Province of Catamarca; San Fernando del Valle: 99.3 FM; Province of Chaco; Resistencia: 92.9 FM; Province of Chubut; Comodoro Rivadavia: 94.3 FM; Province of Córdoba; Córdoba: 93.3 FM; Villa Carlos Paz: 106.9 FM; Province of Corrientes; Corrientes: 106.5 FM; Esquina: 95.5 de FM; Province of Entre Ríos; Gualeguaychú: 100.3 FM; Paraná: 101.9 FM; Province of Formosa; Clorinda: 96.1 FM; Formosa: 88.5 FM; Province of Jujuy; Lib. Gral. San Martin: 95.5 FM; Province of La Pampa; Santa Rosa: 104.9 FM; Province of La Rioja; La Rioja: 92.7 FM; Province of Mendoza; Mendoza: 93.9 FM; San Rafael: 94.9 FM; Province of Misiones; Candelaria: 89.1 FM; Posadas: 670 AM; Province of Neuquén; Neuquén: 102.5 FM; Province of Río Negro; General Roca: 93.5 FM; Las Grutas: 92.1 FM; Villa Regina: 102.7 FM; Viedma: 99.5 FM; Province of Salta; Salta: 94.7 FM; Province of San Juan; San Juan: 94.1 FM; Province of San Luis; San Luis: 94.3 FM; Villa Mercedes: 93.3 FM; Province of Santa Cruz; Río Gallegos: 93.9 FM; Province of Santa Fe; Cañada de Gómez: 89.7 FM; Rafaela: 96.5 FM; Rosario: 89.5 FM; Santa Fe: 104.3 FM; Province of Santiago del Estero; Santiago del Estero: 94.5 FM; Province of Tierra del Fuego; Ushuaia: 89.1 FM; Provincia of Tucumán; San Miguel: 99.9 FM

Programming
- Language: Spanish
- Format: Talk radio Sports radio News radio

Ownership
- Owner: Warner Bros. Discovery (50%) Marcos Brito (50%); (Warner Bros. Discovery Latin America)

History
- First air date: March 11, 2019
- Last air date: December 19, 2025
- Call sign meaning: LR3

Technical information
- Class: A
- ERP: 100 kW

Links
- Website: CNN Radio Argentina

CNN Radio Argentina was an Argentine radio station that broadcast from the City of Buenos Aires.

It was part of the international radio network that bears the same name and which also has subsidiaries in Bolivia, Brazil, Costa Rica, Dominican, Ecuador, El Salvador, Guatemala, Honduras, Mexico, Panama, Paraguay, Puerto Rico, Uruguay and Peru.

== History ==
It began broadcasting in Greater Buenos Aires on March 11, 2019, under the license that belonged to Radio Belgrano (formerly Radio Nacional, Radio 9, La Nueve50 and Radio Libertad), owned by Radio Libertad S.A. (later Argentinos Media S.A.) Its programming is broadcast in more than 47 repeaters in the interior of the country.

Its programming is completely journalistic, made up of, among others, José Antonio Gil Vidal, Pia Shaw, Nacho Girón, Federico Seeber, Mariana Arias, Hernan Harris, Julieta Tarres, Nacho Juliano and Pablo Giralt.

The radio station stopped broadcasting on December 19, 2025. Since then, it only broadcasts music until February 2026, date on which it will be relaunched as StreAM 950, with a new schedule.
