= Combate (TV series) =

Television show in Argentina

- Genre: Reality competition
- Starring: Laura Fernandez (2016-2018); Juani Martinez (2017-2018); Joaquin "Pollo" Alvarez (2016-2017); Thiago Batistuta (2014-2016); Guillermo "Fierita" Catalano (2014-2016)
- Country of origin: Argentina
- Original language: Spanish
- No. of seasons: 13
- No. of episodes: 900

Production
- Production locations: Argentina, Buenos Aires
- Running time: Saturdays and Sundays at 8:00 p.m.

Original release
- Network: Canal 9
- Release: May 12, 2014 – December 30, 2018

Combate is an Argentine adaptation of the reality show Combate Perú. Combate was broadcast for the first time on May 12, 2014, on the Argentine television station Canal 9. The show consists of two teams, one red and the other green, who compete among themselves in different challenges with the goal of earning points for their teams. The show lasted for 13 seasons and ended in 2018.

== Staff ==
Hosts:

- Season 1-5: Guillermo "Fierita" Catalano and Thiago Batistuta were the hosts of the show from the first season to the fifth. In the fifth season, Joaquín "el Pollo" Álvarez was introduced as the host of a derivative program called "Fuera de Combate"
- Season 6: In the sixth season, Álvarez joined the show as a co-host together with Catalano and Batistuta. At the end of the sixth season, Catalano left the show.
- Season 7: In the seventh season, Laurita Fernández became Batistuta and Álvarez's new co-host. At the end of the seventh season, Thiago Batistuta left the show, leaving it to be hosted by Álvarez and Fernández.
- Season 10: In the middle of the tenth season, Álvarez left the show and was replaced by Juani Martínez.

Coaches:

- Héctor "Tito" Speranza is the lead coach since the first season.
- Carolina "Turca" Duer was a trainer in the first season together with Speranza.

Choreographers:

- Laura Fernández was the choreographer of the teams in the first two seasons.
- Kate Rodriguez was the choreographer in the third season.
- Antonella Campaniello was the choreographer from the seventh season to the last one (season 13).

Commentators:

- Florencia Ventura was the commentator during the first two seasons.
- Camila Salazar was introduced as commentator in the third season and stayed until the sixth.
- Estefania Berardi was introduced as commentator in season 13.

Others:

- Mariano Flax had the role of an announcer called "El Jefe" (The Boss) from the first season to the last one (season 13).
- In season 2, Mauricio Trech was introduced as the show's mascot with the name "Eh Gato".

| Participants | | 1 | 2 | 3 | 4 | 5 | 6 | 7 | 8 | 9 | 10 | 11 | 12 | 13 |
|---|---|---|---|---|---|---|---|---|---|---|---|---|---|---|
| (Argentina) | Hector "Tito" Speranza | | | | | | | | | | | | | |
| (Argentina) | Mariano Flax "El Jefe" | | | | | | | | | | | | | |
| (Argentina) | Mauricio Trech "Eh Gato" | | | | | | | | | | | | | |
| (Argentina) | Laura Fernandez | | | | | | | | | | | | | |
| (Argentina) | Thiago Batistuta | | | | | | | | | | | | | |
| (Argentina) | Antonela Campaniello | | | | | | | | | | | | | |
| (Argentina) | Fierita Catalano | | | | | | | | | | | | | |
| (Argentina) | Joaquin "Pollo" Alvarez | | | | | | | | | | | | | |
| (Argentina) | Juani Martinez | | | | | | | | | | | | | |
| (Argentina) | Camila Salazar | | | | | | | | | | | | | |
| (Argentina) | Esmeralda Ruffilli | | | | | | | | | | | | | |
| (Argentina) | Emiliano Fegger | | | | | | | | | | | | | |
| (Argentina) | Florencia Ventura | | | | | | | | | | | | | |
| (Argentina) | Paula Guía | | | | | | | | | | | | | |
| (Argentina) | Carolina "Turca" Duer | | | | | | | | | | | | | |
| (Ecuador) | Kate Rodriguez | | | | | | | | | | | | | |
| (Argentina) | Estefania Berardi | | | | | | | | | | | | | |

== General information ==
=== Point System ===
From the first season to the sixth, the teams competed every day to earn points and win the day. From the seventh season onwards, the teams competed during the weekend. The points could range from 10 to 100 and were accumulated in a weekly basis. The teams also had a wild card that doubled the points. From the eighth season until season 13, the points could still range from 10 to 100, but the teams were no longer able to use the wild card.

=== Nomination and elimination ===
From the first season to the sixth, the team that lost the day had to nominate one of its members for elimination. When the day of the elimination arrived, the 4 nominees had to compete in the games and the one who won was saved. The public saved another by voting through text message, and the last two had to submit to the vote of their peers. In case of a tie, the public made the decision.

In the seventh season, during the first three months of competition, the team that lost had to nominate two of its members, who would compete in the games. The loser was eliminated. But, after the fourth month, the rules changed and the losing team had to nominate a member each weekend, and the elimination round was at the end of the month. The 4 nominees would then compete in the games, and be voted for elimination or not through text message and the vote of their peers.

From the eighth season to the last one (season 13), the teams continued competing on the weekends, but the nominees became 3. Two were nominated by the losing team and the other one by the winning team. They competed in "El Eliminador," a game of questions and answers. The participant who won continued in the competition while the two who lost had to submit themselves to the vote of the public.

=== Penalties ===
Penalties could be applied if a participant arrived late for training, was disrespectful or violated the show's regulations. Penalties included expulsions, suspensions, point removal, direct nomination and losing the opportunity to participate in the following seasons. Expulsion was only used in the first and third seasons for physical violence.

== Seasons ==
=== Regular season ===
| Series | Team winner | Participants winner | Absolute champion |
|---|---|---|---|
| 1 | Green Team | Nicolas Hitchings, Micaela Viciconte, Dalila Martinelli, Maximiliano Ottaviani | Micaela Viciconte |
| 2 | Green Team | Nicolas Hitchings | |
| 3 | Red Team | Florencia Vigna, Sergio Celli, Franjer Pardo | Florencia Vigna |
| 4 | Greem Team | Bruno Sainz Micheli, Gonzalo Gravano, Florencia Vigna | Florencia Vigna |
| 5 | Red Team | Florencia Vigna, Pablo Rodríguez, Mauro Blazquez | Florencia Vigna |
| 6 | Red Team | Pablo Rodriguez, Bianca Di Pascuale, Gonzalo Gravano | Pablo Rodriguez |
| 7 | Green Team | Micaela Viciconte, Federico Molinari, Bruno Sainz Micheli, Bianca Di Pascuale, Ramiro Nayar, Florencia Moyano, Brenda Gómez | Ramiro Nayar |
| 8 | Green Team | Micaela Viciconte, Sofia Mirabelli, Ignaco Nayar | Micaela Viciconte |
| 9 | Green Team | Micaela Viciconte, Ramiro Nayar, Brenda Gomez, Paula Amoedo | Micaela Viciconte |
| 10 | Green Team | Augusto Garcia, Dalila Martinelli, Nahuel Perez | Dalila Martinelli |
| 11 | Green Team | Nicolas Hitchings, Micaela Viciconte, Mariana Cesar | Micaela Viciconte |
| 12 | Green Team | Nicolas Hitchings, Mariana Cesar, Brenda Gomez, Damian Avila | Brenda Gomez |
| 13 | Red Team | Augusto Garcia, Mariana Cesar, Yoel Scaiola, Julieta Tronchin | Augusto García |

== Participants ==
The following list shows participants who have participated throughout the seasons.

| Participants | | 1 | 2 | 3 | 4 | 5 | 6 | 7 | 8 | 9 | 10 | 11 | 12 | 13 |
|---|---|---|---|---|---|---|---|---|---|---|---|---|---|---|
| (Argentina) | Florencia Vigna | 2nd | 2nd | 1st | 1st | 1st | 13th | 2nd | | | | | | |
| (Argentina) | Sergio Celli | 2nd | 4th | 1st | | | | | 9th | 13th | | | | |
| (United States) | Nicolas «Congo» Hitchings | 1st | 1st | 14th | | | | | | 9th | N/A | 1st | 1st | 9th |
| (Argentina) | Dalila Martinelli | 1st | 16th | 9th | | | | | | | 1st | | 14th | |
| (Argentina) | Ana Laura «Anita» Sicipioni | 12th | 13th | 2nd | | | | | | | | | | |
| (Argentina) | Micaela Viciconte | 1st | 6th | | 12th | 2nd | 2nd | 1st | 1st | 1st | N/A | 1st | | |
| (Argentina) | Julian Stravitz | 2nd | 9th | | | | | | | | | | | |
| (Argentina) | Matias Ramallo | 9th | 11th | | | | | | | | | | | |
| (Argentina) | Dario Dominguez | 21st | 15th | | | | | | | | | | | |
| (Argentina) | Carla Tolosa | 19th | 17th | | | | | | | | | | | |
| (Argentina) | Leandro Penna | 11th | N/A | | | | | | | | | | | |
| (Argentina) | Sol Pérez | 22nd | | 13th | | | | | | | | | | |
| (Argentina) | Eugenia Lemos | 10th | | | | | | | | | | | | |
| (Argentina) | Maximiliano Ottaviani | 1st | | | | | | | | | | | | |
| (Argentina) | Barbara Tornadore | 2nd | | | | | | | | | | | | |
| (Argentina) | Noelia Tamargo | 20th | | | | | | | | | | | | |
| (Argentina) | Eloy Rivera | 18th | | | | | | | | | | | | |
| (Argentina) | Victor Rebbecini | 16th | | | | | | | | | | | | |
| (Argentina) | Nadya Hernandez | 15th | | | | | | | | | | | | |
| (Argentina) | Nahuel Sanchez | 14th | | | | | | | | | | | | |
| (Argentina) | Giuliana Maglietti | 13th | | | | | | | | | | | | |
| (Argentina) | Federico Abuin | 17th | | | | | | | | | | | | |
| (Argentina) | Pablo «Paio» Rodriguez | | 14th | 2nd | 2nd | 1st | 1st | 2nd | 11th | 2nd | N/A | | | 25th |
| (Argentina) | Nicolás Occhiato | | 3rd | 15th | 11th | 7th | 7th | | | | | | | |
| (Argentina) | Paula Amoedo | | 7th | 11th | 2nd | 12th | | 2nd | 2nd | 1st | | | | |
| (Argentina) | Matias «Matt» Ferrario | | 5th | 2nd | 13th | 15th | | 16th | | | | | | |
| (Argentina) | Delfina Gerez Bosco | | N/A | | | | | | | | | | | |
| (Argentina) | Lucas Velasco | | N/A | N/A | | | | | | | | | | |
| (Argentina) | Claudia Ciardone | | N/A | | | | | | | | | | | |
| (Argentina) | Alan Muszkat | | 20th | | | | | | | | | | | |
| (Argentina) | Mayra Pavón | | 19th | | | | | | | | | | | |
| (Argentina) | Mariana Goutlat | | 18th | | | | | | | | | | | |
| (Argentina) | Leonela Ahumada | | 12th | | | | | | | | | | | |
| (Argentina) | Mayra Cigulitti | | 10th | | | | | | | | | | | |
| (Argentina) | Dario Pandiani | | 8th | | | | | | | | | | | |
| (Argentina) | Cristian U. | | | N/A | | | | | | 12th | | | | |
| (Argentina) | Gonzalo Gravano | | | 7th | 1st | | 1st | 2nd | | | | | | |
| (Argentina) | Candelaria Ayusa | | | 8th | 18th | | | | | | | | | |
| (Argentina) | Kevin Hercog | | | 12th | 14th | | | | | | | | | |
| (Argentina) | Stefania Sánchez | | | 20th | | | | | | | | | | |
| (Argentina) | Eric Belliti | | | 18th | | | | | | | | | | |
| (Argentina) | Micaela Prosperio | | | 19th | | | | | | | | | | |
| (Argentina) | Cynthia Cofano | | | 16th | | | | | | | | | | |
| (Argentina) | Lautaro Floresta | | | 17th | | | | | | | | | | |
| (Argentina) | Azul Tuzinkevich | | | 10th | | | | | | | | | | |
| (Venezuela) | Franjer Pardo | | | 1st | | | | | | | | | | |
| (Argentina) | Cinthia Fernandez | | | N/A | | | | | | | | | | |
| (Argentina) | Ignacio «Nacho» Nayar | | | | 8th | 2nd | 8th | 2nd | 1st | 2nd | | | | |
| (Argentina) | Ramiro Nayar | | | | 2nd | 8th | 17th | 1st | 2nd | 1st | | | | |
| (Argentina) | Bruno Sainz Micheli | | | | 1st | 2nd | 2nd | 1st | | | | | | 17th |
| (Argentina) | Bianca DiPascuale | | | | 9th | 10th | 1st | 1st | | | N/A | | | 13th |
| (Argentina) | Martin «Pity» Landeira | | | | 7th | 16th | 11th | 2nd | | | | | | |
| (Argentina) | Federico Molinari | | | | N/A | | | 1st | | | | | | |
| (Argentina) | Virginia Gallardo | | | | N/A | | | | | | | | | |
| (Argentina) | Laurita Fernández | | | | N/A | | | | | | | | | |
| (Argentina) | Estefania Berardi | | | | 10th | | 16th | 15th | | 16th | N/A | | | |
| (Argentina) | Macarena Samaniego | | | | 20th | | | | | | | | | |
| (Ecuador) | Kryssel Valoz | | | | 19th | | | | | | | | | |
| (Argentina) | Lara Simone | | | | 17th | | | | | | | | | 14th |
| (Argentina) | Federico Dominguez | | | | 16th | | | | | | | | | |
| (Argentina) | Luz Ereros | | | | 15th | | | | | | | | | |
| (Argentina) | El Polaco | | | | N/A | | | | | | | | | |
| (Argentina) | Mauro «Pitu» Blazquez | | | | | 1st | 2nd | 18th | | | | | | |
| (Argentina) | Andrea Camacho | | | | | 14th | 14th | | | | | | | |
| (Argentina) | Francheska Valentinotti | | | | | 22nd | | | | | | | | |
| (Argentina) | Estefania «Efa» Bezi | | | | | 21st | | | | | | | | |
| (Argentina) | Nicole «Nikki» Zelaya | | | | | 20th | | | | | | | | |
| (Argentina) | Azul Artero | | | | | 19th | | | | | | | | |
| (Argentina) | Agustin Rios | | | | | 18th | | | | | | | | |
| (Argentina) | Joséfina «Cacha» Cacciabúe | | | | | 17th | | | | | | | | |
| (Argentina) | Emiliano Verdum | | | | | 13th | | | | | | | | |
| (Argentina) | Matias «Tute» Mustafa | | | | | 11th | | | | | | | | |
| (Argentina) | Sean Kelly | | | | | 9th | | | | | | | | |
| (Argentina) | Jazmin Vallejos | | | | | | 22nd | | | | | | | |
| (Argentina) | Leandro Soria | | | | | | 21st | | | | | | | |
| (Argentina) | Camila Cabbane | | | | | | 20th | | | | | | | |
| (Uruguay) | Cecilia Comunales | | | | | | 19th | | | | | | | |
| (Argentina) | Agustina Aidar | | | | | | 18th | | | | | | | |
| (Argentina) | Nahuel Peñañori | | | | | | 15th | | | | | | | |
| (Argentina) | Laura Legal | | | | | | 13th | | | | | | | |
| (Argentina) | Emiliano Isaenza | | | | | | 12th | | | | | | | |
| (Argentina) | Federico Nadaud | | | | | | 9th | | | | | | | |
| (Argentina) | Brenda Gomez | | | | | | | 1st | 2nd | 1st | | 2nd | 1st | 15th |
| (Argentina) | Florencia Moyano | | | | | | | 1st | | 2nd | | | | |
| (Argentina) | Damian Avila | | | | | | | 17th | | 10th | N/A | 7th | 1st | 2nd |
| (Argentina) | Valeria «Valery» Aranda | | | | | | | 2nd | | | | | | |
| (Argentina) | Ludmila «Luli» Francos | | | | | | | 20th | | | 2nd | | | |
| (Argentina) | Flavio Lilli | | | | | | | 22nd | | | | | | |
| (Argentina) | Frabizio «Fabro» Valori | | | | | | | 19th | | | | | | |
| (Argentina) | Sebastian Pelegrini | | | | | | | 21st | | | | | | |
| (Brazil) | Sofia «Soso» Mirabelli | | | | | | | | 1st | 11th | | | | |
| (Argentina) | Macarena Lemos | | | | | | | | 16th | 2nd | | | | |
| (Argentina) | Alan Garcia | | | | | | | | 10th | 14th | | 23rd | | |
| (Argentina) | Mauricio Sabin Paz | | | | | | | | 14th | | | | | |
| (Argentina) | Aleajandro Majil | | | | | | | | 13th | | | | | |
| (Argentina) | Barbara Ferrari | | | | | | | | 12th | | | | | |
| (Argentina) | Anabella Crosetti | | | | | | | | 15th | | | | | |
| (Argentina) | Evangelina «Vanshi» Thomas | | | | | | | | 8th | | | | | |
| (Argentina) | Ariel Cetrari | | | | | | | | 7th | | | | | |
| (Argentina) | Julieta Rodriguez | | | | | | | | | 15th | | | | |
| (Argentina) | Augusto «Richard» Garcia | | | | | | | | | | 1st | 2nd | 9th | 1st |
| (Argentina) | Mariana «Mai» Cesar | | | | | | | | | | 12th | 1st | 1st | 1st |
| (Haiti) | Makenson «Mike» Bonheur | | | | | | | | | | 16th | 12th | | |
| (Argentina) | Juan Mateo «Coco» Halle | | | | | | | | | | 2nd | 2nd | | 10th |
| (Argentina) | Luisina «Lalu» Ojeda | | | | | | | | | | 8th | 21st | | |
| (Argentina) | Florencia Nigro | | | | | | | | | | 2nd | 24th | | |
| (Argentina) | Victoria «Vicu» Irouleguy | | | | | | | | | | 13th | 13th | | |
| (Argentina) | Belen Rita | | | | | | | | | | 14th | | | |
| (Argentina) | Nahuel Perez | | | | | | | | | | 1st | | | |
| (Argentina) | Ivan «Ivo» Martes | | | | | | | | | | 9th | | | |
| (Argentina) | Gabriel «El Pola» Sierra | | | | | | | | | | 11th | | | |
| (Brazil) | Michel Stuart | | | | | | | | | | 15th | | | |
| (Argentina) | Daniel Outeda | | | | | | | | | | 7th | | | |
| (Argentina) | Bianca Iovenitti | | | | | | | | | | 10th | | | |
| (Argentina) | Camila Perira | | | | | | | | | | | 14th | 10th | |
| (Argentina) | Sebastian Euguino | | | | | | | | | | | 8th | 2nd | |
| (Brazil) | Douglas Gomes Lemos | | | | | | | | | | | 15th | | 18th |
| (Argentina) | Nicolas Krupnik | | | | | | | | | | | 11th | | 12th |
| (Argentina) | Luana Fernandez | | | | | | | | | | | 16th | | 11th |
| (Argentina) | Daiana Quiroz | | | | | | | | | | | 9th | | |
| (Argentina) | Ana Laura Cardini | | | | | | | | | | | 25th | | |
| (Argentina) | Facundo Atunes | | | | | | | | | | | 22nd | | |
| (Argentina) | Milagros Rancaño | | | | | | | | | | | 18th | | |
| (Argentina) | Mauro Martinak | | | | | | | | | | | 19th | | |
| (Argentina) | Melina Depiano | | | | | | | | | | | 20th | | |
| (Argentina) | Carla Suescun | | | | | | | | | | | 17th | | |
| (Argentina) | Facundo Penzi | | | | | | | | | | | 10th | | |
| (Argentina) | Lourdes Puppi | | | | | | | | | | | | 19th | 2nd |
| (Argentina) | Agustin del Solar | | | | | | | | | | | | 16th | 20th |
| (Argentina) | Salomon «Salo» Silberman | | | | | | | | | | | | 13th | 16th |
| (Argentina) | Julieta Tronchin | | | | | | | | | | | | 2nd | 1st |
| (Argentina) | Tomas «Toto» Palacios | | | | | | | | | | | | 17th | |
| (Argentina) | Jacqueline Grisolia | | | | | | | | | | | | 2nd | |
| (Peru) | Ignacio «Nacho» Diaz | | | | | | | | | | | | 2nd | |
| (Argentina) | Abril Zaffiro | | | | | | | | | | | | 11th | |
| (Argentina) | Victoria Garcia | | | | | | | | | | | | 18th | |
| (Argentina) | Valeria Benitez | | | | | | | | | | | | 15th | |
| (Argentina) | Esteban «Tata» Elizalde | | | | | | | | | | | | 12th | |
| (Argentina) | Ramiro Rivero | | | | | | | | | | | | 20th | |
| (Argentina) | Locho Loccisano | | | | | | | | | | | | | 2nd |
| (Argentina) | Yoel «Yagui» Scaiola | | | | | | | | | | | | | 1st |
| (Argentina) | Azul Granton | | | | | | | | | | | | | 2nd |
| (Argentina) | Luisina Sendra | | | | | | | | | | | | | 19th |
| (Argentina) | Daphne Lie | | | | | | | | | | | | | 21st |
| (Argentina) | Carolina Pagano | | | | | | | | | | | | | 22nd |
| (Argentina) | Ricardo Rivas | | | | | | | | | | | | | 23rd |
| (Argentina) | Fiorella Sia | | | | | | | | | | | | | 24th |
| (Argentina) | Milagros Irerra | | | | | | | | | | | | | 26th |
| (Argentina) | Evelyn Del Grande | | | | | | | | | | | | | 27th |
