= Germán Martitegui =

Argentine chef and MasterChef Judge

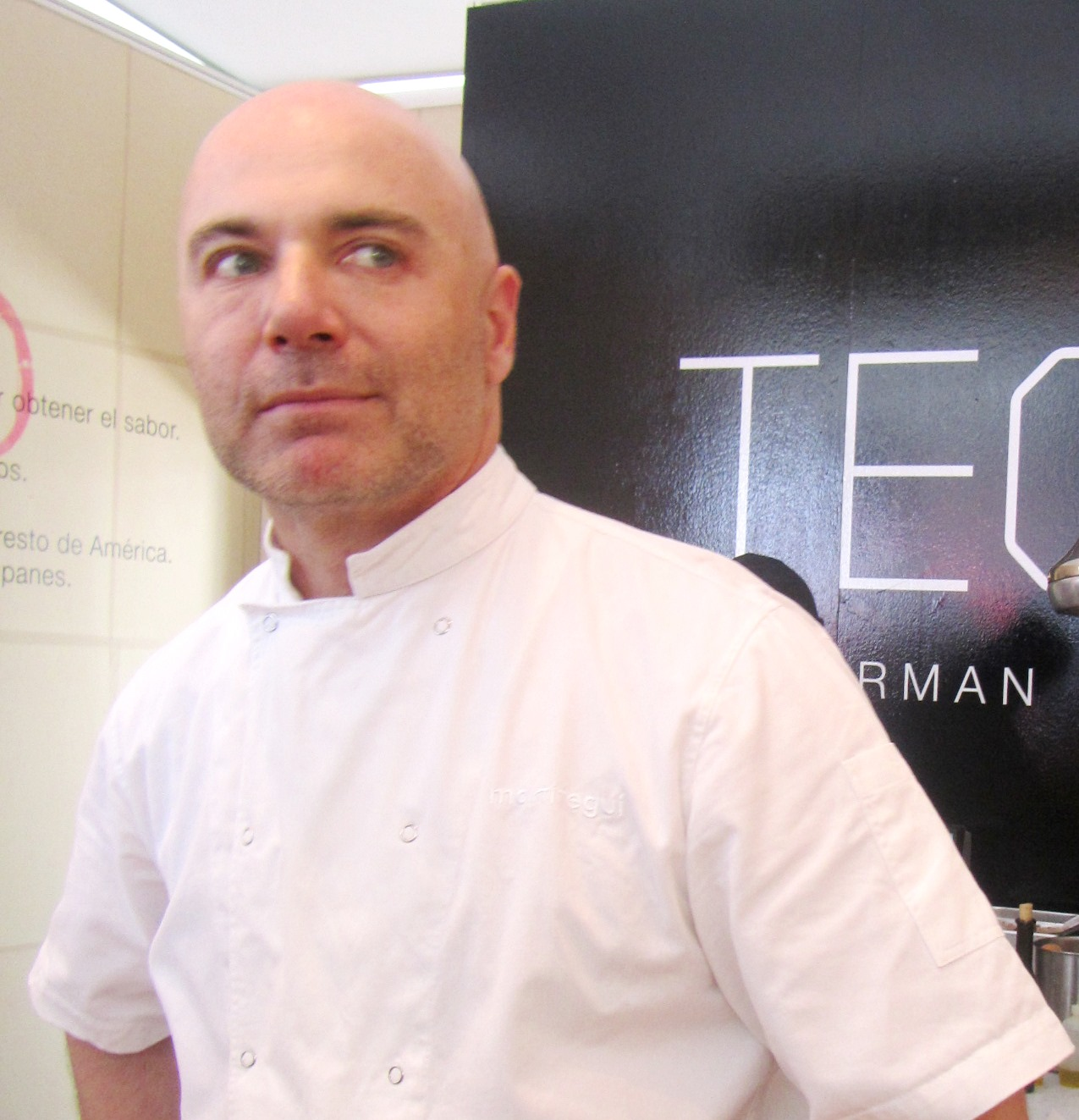
- Born: Germán Martitegui; 16 June 1966 (age 60); Necochea, Buenos Aires Province, Argentina
- Occupations: Businessman; television host and chef
- Television: MasterChef Argentina; MasterChef Celebrity; Manos arriba, chef!
- Children: 2 (Lorenzo and Lautaro)

Germán Martitegui (Born; June 16, 1966) is an Argentine chef. He owns the prestigious restaurant Tegui. He was a judge on MasterChef and MasterChef Junior in Argentina, along with Christophe Krywonis and Donato De Santis.

He is currently a judge on MasterChef Celebrity Argentina along with Damián Betular and Donato de Santis.

== Biography ==
Martitegui was born in Necochea, Buenos Aires Province, where he spent much of his time at home experimenting with cooking and learning from his grandmothers.

He studied International Relations and Foreign Trade at the University of Salvador. He was an assistant to the chef Beatriz Chomnalez and at 19 began working in the kitchen of the La Cascada Hotel in Bariloche, where he stayed for almost two years. He then lived in France and Los Angeles. In 1994, he returned to Buenos Aires and began working with Francis Mallmann as head chef.

In 2001, he opened his first restaurant, Olsen, which later had a branch in Madrid, Spain. In 2004, he created the restaurant Casa Cruz, and in 2009, Tegui.

In 2024, Martitegui opened MARTI, a vegan restaurant.

== Television ==
Year	Title	Role	Season
2014–2025	MasterChef Argentina	Judge	1 · 2 · 3 • 4
2015–2016	MasterChef Junior	Judge	1 · 2
2020–present	Masterchef Celebrity Argentina	Judge	1 · 2 · 3 · R · 5
2020–present	Proyecto Tierras	Host	1 · 2 · 3
2021–2022	San clemente del tuyú TV	Chef	1 · 2
