= Renacer (Naëla album) =

Studio album by Naela
- Released: 7 December 2016
- Recorded: 2015–16
- Genre: Pop
- Length: 36:30
- Language: Spanish
- Label: The Light Entertainment
- Producer: Buxxi; José Gaviria; Jorge Luis Piloto; Mauricio Rivera

Naela chronology
The Remixes (2014)	Renacer (2016)	Unplugged (2022)

Singles from Renacer
- 1. "Cada Momento" Released: June 9, 2015; 2. "Al Despertar" Released: February 24, 2016; 3. "Es Mejor Que Sea Así" Released: March 18, 2017

Renacer is the third studio album by Colombian singer-songwriter Naëla. It was released on digital platforms on December 7, 2016, by The Light Entertainment label. Two singles have been released from the album so far: "Cada Momento", which was published on June 9, 2015, and "Al Despertar", which was published on February 24, 2016. Among the producers of the album are the singers Buxxi, José Gaviria and Mauricio Rivera.

== Track listing ==
1. Cada Momento - 3:05
2. La Noche - 3:27
3. Quien Te Dijo - 3:48
4. Al Despertar - 3:21
5. Es Mejor Que Sea Así - 3:19
6. Apostando el Sol - 3:16
7. Para Repetirlo - 3:32
8. Cada Momento (Latin Bollywood Version)
9. Cada Momento (Urban Version)
10. La Noche (Pop Version)
11. Al Despertar (Urban Version)
