= Micaela Viciconte =

Argentine actress

Mica Viciconte
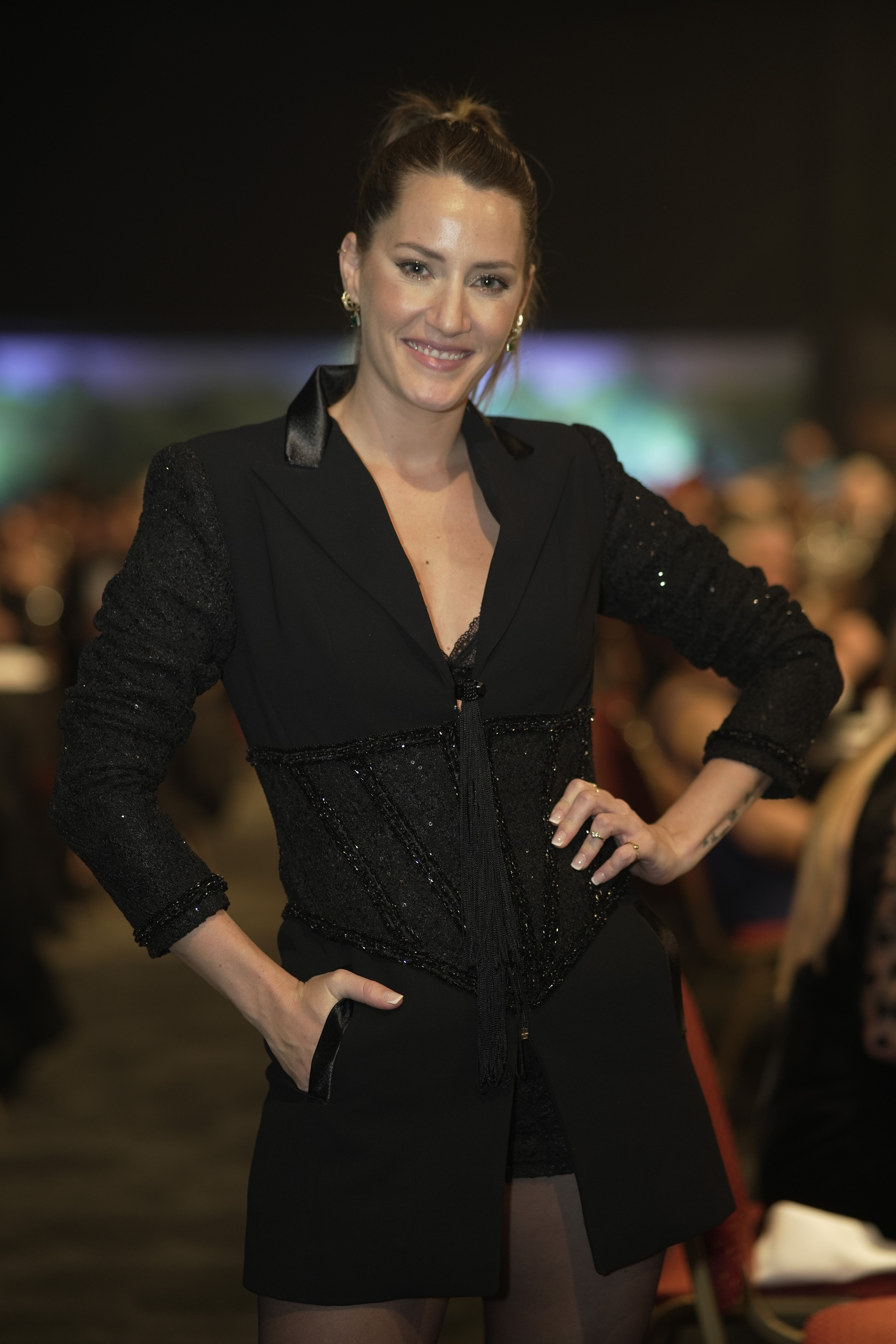
- Born: Micaela Lorena Viciconte; 3 May 1989 (age 37); Argentina Mar del Plata, Buenos Aires. Argentina.
- Other name: Mica Viciconte
- Occupations: Lifeguard, athlete, model, swimming teacher, influencer, and radio and television panelist
- Height: 1.72 m (5 ft 8 in)
- Partner(s): Mauro Blazquez (2016-2017); Fabián Cubero (2017-present)
- Children: Luca Cubero (Birth 2022)
- Relatives: Lara Viciconte; Diego Viciconte

Micaela Lorena Viciconte (born 3 May 1989) better known as Mica Viciconte, is an Argentine television personality, lifeguard, and athlete.

Viciconte was born in Mar del Plata, Buenos Aires Province, Argentina. She participated in and won some seasons of the reality show Combate Argentina. In 2017, she was a contestant on the dance competition Dancing for a Dream, where she reached the final stage. In 2018, she was a semi-finalist of the competition. She participated in other TV programs such as Todas las Tardes, Incorrectas, El Show Del Problema, It is in your hands, and more. In 2021, she started her own radio show "Show Attack" and participated and won the third season of Master Chef Celebrity Argentina.

== Early life ==
Viciconte studied to be a lifeguard in the Sindicato del Mar. While she was 18, she gave swimming lessons, among other jobs. After a period without work and a personal situation, she moved to Buenos Aires.

== Career ==
=== Television ===
In 2014, she debuted as a contestant on the physical competition show Combate, where she reached the finals and won the season as part of a team. In addition, the public chose her as "Absolute Champion", taking an extra prize of 100,000 Argentine pesos. She later agreed to participate in the second season, where she became the 15th contestant eliminated.

In 2015, she received a job offer in Chile to work as a promoter. Upon returning to Argentina, she participated in the fourth season of Combate where she was eliminated after 67 days. During the fifth season, she reached the finals but wasn't able to win them.

In 2016, she participated in the sixth season where she reached the finals but again failed to win the final. During the seventh season, after a disagreement with her rival, Flor Vigna, she became the captain of the Green Team. Shortly before the end of the season, Viciconte and her then partner decided to leave the show, causing a stir among the show's fanbase. Later, the public voted for her to re-enter the program, and she was awarded winner along with her team.

In 2018, in her last season of Combate, she again was titled "Absolute Champion". She also participated in Bailando 2018, where she eliminated Benjamín Alfonso, Cinthia Fernández, Diego Ramos and Lourdes Sánchez, being finally eliminated by Julián Serrano and Sofía Morandi in the semifinal. She was a panelist on Incorrect afterwards.

In May 2020, she announced that she was joining the panel of El show del problema, after leaving Incorrectas after it went off the air. In addition, she served as a panelist on Pampita Online, and currently she is on the show She Is In Your Hands..

=== Other pursuits ===
She made her film debut playing Anna in Bathrooms 5: Slow and Loady.

== Personal life ==
She is currently the partner of the soccer player and businessman Fabián Cubero.

== Filmography ==
Year	Title		Role	Notes
2014	(Argentina)	Combate	Green Team Contestant	Winner team
2014	(Argentina)	Combate 2G	Green Team Contestant	14th eliminated
2015	(Argentina)	Combate 4G	Green Team Contestant	9th eliminated
2015	(Argentina)	Combate 5G	Green Team Contestant	Runner-up team
2016	(Argentina)	Combate 6G	Green Team Contestant	Runner-up team
2016	(Argentina)	Combate Evolucion	Captain of the Green Team	Winner team
2016	(Argentina)	LOS40 Music Awards	Co-Host	Event musical
2016	(Peru)	Combate, temporada 12	Green Team Contestant	Abandoned
2017	(Argentina)	Combate 8G	Green Team Contestant	Winner team
2017	(Argentina)	Combate 9G	Green Team Contestant	Winner team
2017	(Argentina)	Combate 10G	Green Team Reinforcement Contestant	
2017	(Argentina)	Bailando 2017	Contestant with Jorge Moliniers	21st eliminated
2017–2018	(Argentina)	Combate Revancha	Green Team Contestant	Winner team
2017–2018	(Argentina)	Todas las tardes	Panelist	
2018–2020	(Argentina)	Incorrectas	Panelist	
2018	(Argentina)	Bailando 2018	Contestant with Ignacio Saraceni	4th place
2020	(Argentina)	El show del problema: En Casa	Panelist	
2020	(Argentina)	Cantando 2020	Contestant with Alejandro Gallo	9th eliminated
2020	(Argentina)	Pampita Online	Panelist	
2021–2022	(Argentina)	MasterChef Celebrity 3	Contestant	Winner
2022	(Argentina)	MasterChef Celebrity: La Revancha	Contestant	1st eliminated
2022–present	(Argentina)	Ariel en su salsa	Panelist	

=== Paltaform digital ===
Year	Title		Role	Notes
2018–2019	(Argentina)	Beauty, with Mica Viciconte	Host	

=== Cinema ===
Year	Title		Character	Notes
2018	(Argentina)	Bañeros 5: Lentos y cargosos	Anna	Co-star

=== Theater ===
Year	Title		Character	Place	Notes
2018–2019	(Argentina)	Nuevamente juntos, un amor de revista	Various	Mar del Plata	Co-star
2019–2020	(Argentina)	Atrapados en el museo	Carola	Villa Carlos Paz	Co-star

=== Radio ===
Year	Title		Role	Radio	Grades
2021–2022	(Argentina)	Show Attack 5	Host	Radio Top	

== Awards and nominations ==
Year	Awards	Category	Worked	Outcome
2014	Fans Awards	Best Kiss (shared with Julián Stravitz)	Combate	Nominated
2014	Fans Awards	Brutal honesty	Herself	Nominated
2015	Notirey Awards	Combat Goddess	Combate	Won
2015	Fans Awards	Goddess	Herself	Won
2015	Fans Awards	Attitude of the Year	Herself	Nominated
2017	Martín Fierro Digital Awards	Best Digital Star	Herself	Won
2017	Fans Awards	Goddess	Herself	Won
2017	Fans Awards	Best fandom	Herself	Won
2017	MTV Millennial Awards	God level Instagrammer - Argentina	Herself	Won
2017	Most Clicked Awards	Celebrities with the Most Rating in Intinternet	Herself	Won
2017	Kids' Choice Awards Argentina	Trendy girl	Herself	Won
2017	Kids' Choice Awards Argentina	Best fandom	Herself	Won
2018	Fans Awards	Best fandom	Herself	Won
2018	MTV Millennial Awards	God level Instagrammer - Argentina	Herself	Nominated
2018	Most Clicked Awards	Celebrities with the Most Rating on the Internet	Herself	Won
2018	Kids' Choice Awards Argentina	Favorite instagramer	Herself	Won
2019	Awards The most clicked	Celebrities with the Most Rating on the Internet	Herself	Won
