= Espejos azules =

Studio album by Pablo Ruiz
- Released: 1990
- Recorded: 1990
- Genre: Pop
- Language: Spanish
- Label: EMI Capitol

Pablo Ruiz chronology
Océano (1989)	Espejos azules (1990)	Irresistible (1992)

Espejos azules (Spanish: Blue mirror) is the fourth studio album by the Argentine singer Pablo Ruiz. It was released in 1990.

== Track list ==
1. Manías
2. Nuestro Amor
3. Fantasmas En Tu Habitación
4. Espejos Azules
5. No Sé Qué Pasará
6. Pregúntale A La Luna
7. Loco Por Ti
8. Carcajadas
9. Manías (Remixed version) (Bonus track)
