= Mariano Dalla Libera =

Argentinian footballer (born 1964)

Mariano David Dalla Libera (born 4 April 1964) is an Argentine former professional footballer who played as a midfielder.

== Early life ==
Dalla Libera grew up in Los Polvorines, Argentina.

== Playing career ==
Dalla Libera was nicknamed "Loco". In 1991, he signed for Mexican side Puebla, where he suffered an injury. In 1994, he signed for Argentine side Platense.

== Style of play ==
Dalla Libera mainly operated as a midfielder and was known for his creativity.

== Post-playing career ==
After retiring from professional football, Dalla Libera raced in the TC Pista. He also competed in Argentine television show MasterChef Celebrity Argentina.

== Personal life ==
Dalla Libera has three grandchildren.
