= Kingsgate, Huddersfield =

Coordinates: 53.6458°N 1.77878°W

Kingsgate
- Location: Huddersfield, West Yorkshire, England
- Opened: February 2002
- Owner: WD Leisure
- Num. of stores: 47
- Num. of anchor tenants: 1
- Floor area: 280,000 square feet (26,000 m^{2})
- Floors: 1
- Parking: 650
- Website: http://www.kingsgateshoppingcentre.co.uk/

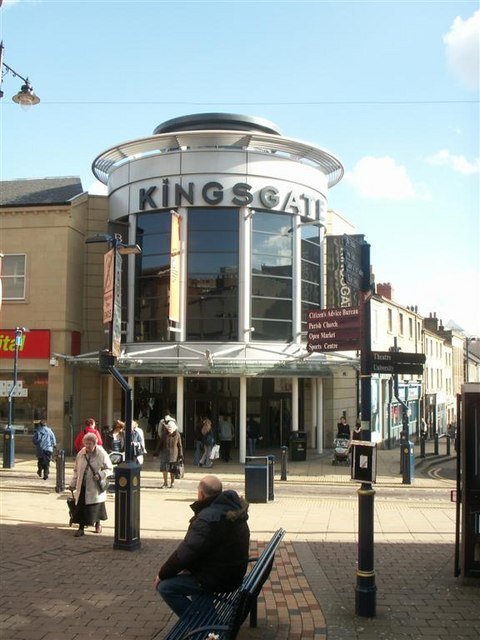
The centre in 2014

The Kingsgate Shopping Centre is a shopping centre in Huddersfield located to the west of Shorehead Roundabout and East of the junction of King Street and Queen Street and Cross Church Street. It is currently owned by WD Huddersfield Ltd, a subsidy of WD Leisure. It opened in February 2002 after 12 years of planning and delays. The £50m pound complex took 18 months to complete and contains over 40 stores including: a Sports Direct, a TK Maxx and a Three Mobile store. On the premises there is also a 600 space car park. It is constructed out of 1,600 tonnes of locally quarried stone and more than 3,000sq metres of glass.

== Expansion ==
Kingsgate 2 was announced in the summer of 2007 with plans to extend the shopping centre with a new single-level trading mall with two-level stores linking to the existing complex. However, Kirkles Council rejected the proposal because it would jeopardise rival proposals to redevelop Queensgate – a scheme which also failed to materialise.

In 2014 WD Huddersfield Ltd changed its plans for Kingsgate 2 in favour of Kingsgate Leisure – a new scheme to provide six restaurants and a multiplex cinema. The company said the £15m scheme, which could create up to 150 jobs, would boost Huddersfield’s evening economy. Construction is expected to begin in 2018 with opening in late 2019. The Light have been named as the tenant of the multi-screen cinema.

== Tenants ==
As of October 2019 the tenants are as follows- JD, The Body Shop, Bagel Nash, Kings, The Fragrance Shop, Little Lotus, New Look, Thomsons, Newspoint, TK Maxx, Claires, Next, Clarks, O2, Clintons, Office, Vodafone, Costa Coffee, Waterstones, EE, Panini Shack, River Island, F. Hinds, Game, Greggs, Smiggle, Sports Direct, Stormfront, H&M, Suit Direct, HMV, Pandora and The Entertainer Toy Shop.
