= Candelaria, Misiones =

Candelaria (Misiones)
- Municipality and village
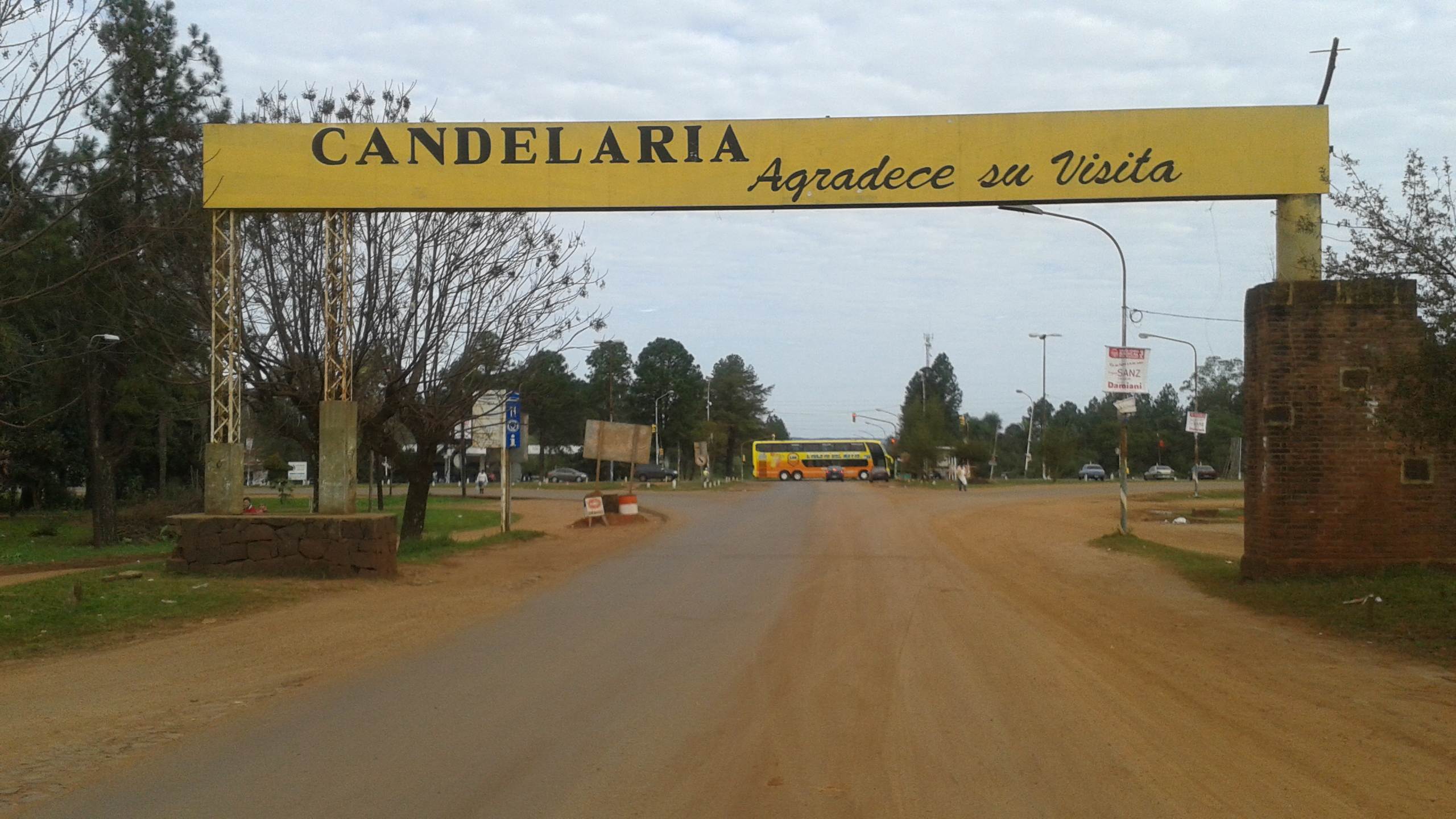

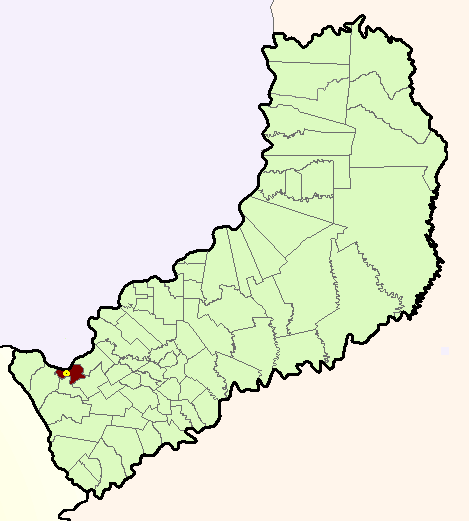

- Location within Argentina
- Coordinates: 27°27′34″S 55°44′43″W
- Country: Argentina
- Province: Misiones Province

Population (2010)
  - Total: 25,140
- Time zone: UTC−3 (ART)

Candelaria (Misiones) is a village and municipality in Misiones Province in north-eastern Argentina. Historically, the ownership of Candelaria was heavily disputed between Argentina and Paraguay. The Paraguayans abandoned it in 1815, but returned in 1821. By 1838, the surrounding area had been heavily fortified by the Paraguayans. Candelaria was returned to Argentina in 1870, following the defeat of Paraguay in the Paraguayan War.
