= Donato De Santis =

Italian chef and MasterChef Judge

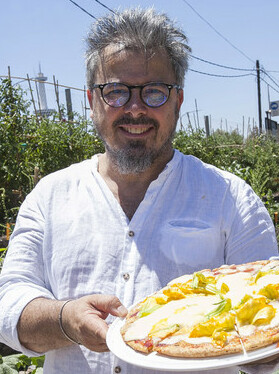
- De Santis in 2017.
- Born: Donato De Santis; 5 March 1964 (age 62); Milan, Italy
- Occupations: Businessman; television host and chef
- Style: Italian cuisine
- Television: MasterChef Argentina; MasterChef Celebrity; Manos arriba, chef!
- Spouse: Micaela Paglayan (m. 2004)
- Children: Raffaella and Francesca
- Website: http://www.donatodesantis.com/

Donato De Santis (Born, March 5, 1964) is an Italian chef based in Argentina specializing in Italian cuisine. Since 2000, he has lived in Buenos Aires, where he founded his own restaurant, Cucina Paradiso. He has hosted numerous television programs and was a judge on the Argentine version of MasterChef in 2014 and 2015. From 2020 to 2026, he participated in MasterChef Celebrity.

In 2026, during the final of the season four of MasterChef Celebrity, he announced his retirement from the franchise after more than 10 years as a judge in order to prioritize his family and look for other opportunities.

== Biography and career ==
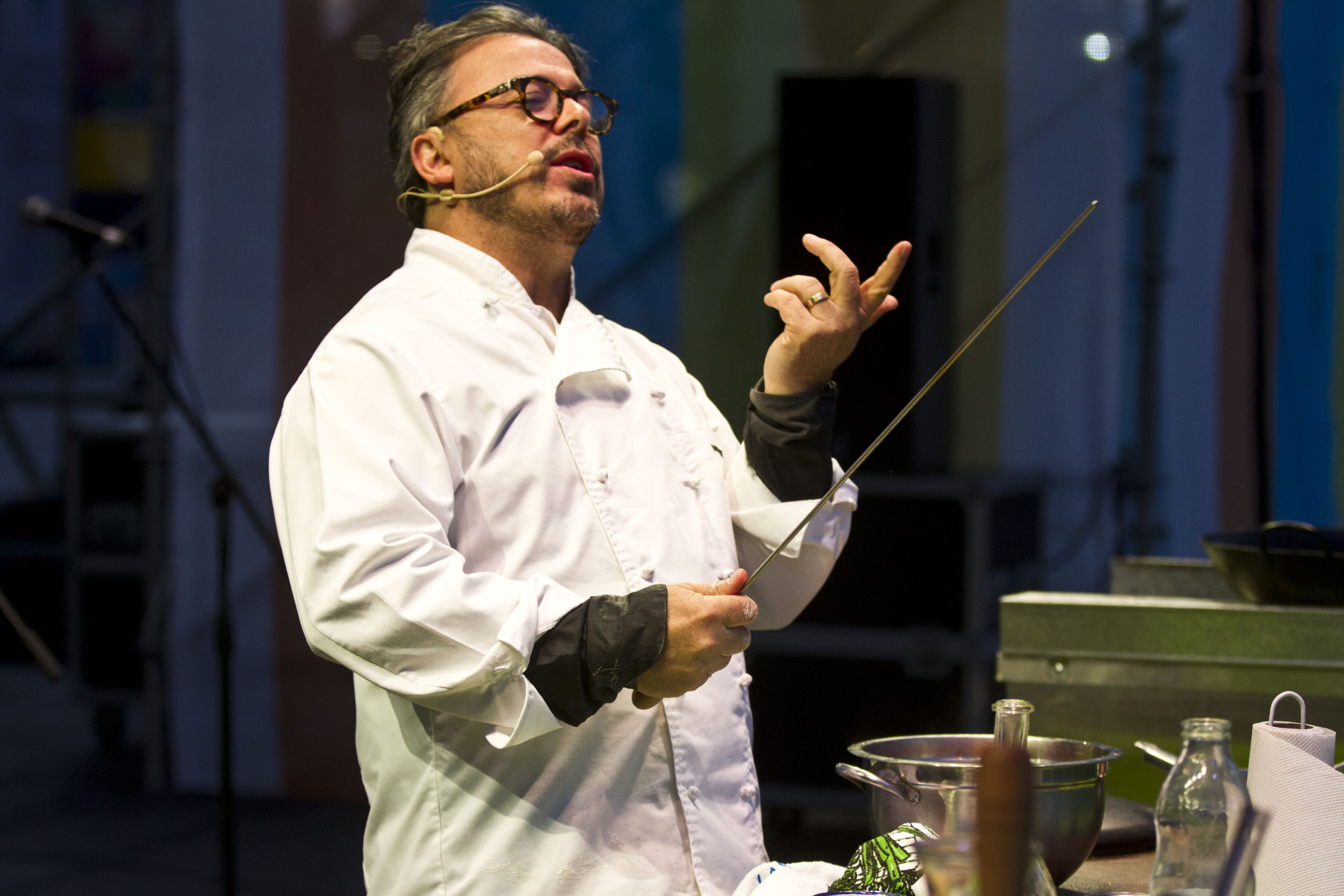
De Santis in 2015.

De Santis was born in Milan in 1964. He grew up between that city and the region of Apulia, in southern Italy, where his family originally came from. He studied gastronomy at the state school Carlo Porta in Milan. He began working professionally in the kitchen in 1980, under chef Georges Cogny at the restaurant L'Antica Ostería del Teatro, in Piacenza.

In the United States, he worked in various restaurants in Los Angeles, Santa Monica, Hollywood, Chicago, Palm Beach (where he was in charge of opening Bice), and Miami. He was later hired as the chef of designer Gianni Versace for his mansion Casa Casuarina in Miami Beach.

In 2000, he settled in Buenos Aires, where he taught in various places, including the Colegio de Cocineros founded by Gato Dumas. For two years he ran the kitchen at Verace, until February 2005, when he established his own restaurant, Cucina Paradiso. He published four cookbooks: Cucina Paradiso, My Italian Kitchen, Fatto in Casa, and Donato per Bambini.

He hosted several programs on the cable channel El Gourmet, including Cocineros en juego, Cooking Emergency, Donato cucina, Donato invita, All'uso nostro, La villa della pasta, and Chefs Unplugged. In 2012, he hosted Italianísima, broadcast by Utilísima. In 2004, he co-hosted Los cocineros en casa with Martiniano Molina, and was in charge of the culinary segment of the general-interest program Las Millie y una.

He also participated in various cooking reality shows on Telefe channel. In 2014 and 2015, he was a judge on MasterChef and, in 2016, on Dueños de la cocina, alongside Narda Lepes and Christophe Krywonis. Since 2020, he has participated in MasterChef Celebrity Argentina. In July 2021, he starred, together with Germán Martitegui and Damián Betular, in Manos arriba, chef!, a reality show spin-off of MasterChef Celebrity.

He is also one of the six advisors of the Gruppo Virtuale Cuochi Italiani, which brings together more than 1,200 chefs from around the world and seeks to promote Italian cuisine, its products and raw materials.

== Private life ==
In 2000, De Santis met Micaela Paglayan, whom he married in 2004. They have two daughters, Raffaella and Francesca. De Santis is a Buddhist and a major collector and follower of Elvis Presley music
