= Quizás (Rich Music, Sech and Dalex song) =

2019 single by Sech and Dalex

Single by Rich Music, Sech and Dalex featuring Justin Quiles, Lenny Tavárez, Feid, Wisin and Zion

from the EP The Academy
- Language: Spanish
- English title: "Maybe"
- Released: September 20, 2019
- Genre: Reggaeton
- Label: Rich Music
- Songwriter(s): Carlos Morales; Pedro Daleccio; Jorge Valdés; Johan Espinosa; Julio González; Salomón Villada; Joshua Mendez; Justin Quiles; Juan Luis Morera; Félix Torres
- Producer(s): Dímelo Flow; Jowan

Rich Music singles chronology
"Quizás" (2019)	"Ta, Ta, Ta" (2020)

Sech singles chronology
"Ron" (remix) (2019)	"Quizás" (2019)	"Si Te Vas" (2019)

Dalex singles chronology
"Bellaquita" (2019)	"Quizás" (2019)	"Cosita" (2019)

Justin Quiles singles chronology
"DJ, No Pare" (remix) (2019)	"Quizás" (2019)	"Que Le Dé" (remix) (2019)

Lenny Tavárez singles chronology
"Bellaquita" (2019)	"Quizás" (2019)	"Cosita" (2019)

Feid singles chronology
"Ron" (remix) (2019)	"Quizás" (2019)	"Te Quiero Ver" (2019)

Wisin singles chronology
"3G" (2019)	"Quizás" (2019)	"Una Noche" (2019)

Zion singles chronology
"DJ, No Pare" (remix) (2019)	"Quizás" (2019)	"La Isla" (2019)

Music video
- "Quizás" on YouTube

"Quizás" (English: "Maybe") is a song by American record label Rich Music, Panamian singer Sech and American singer Dalex featuring fellow American singer Justin Quiles, Puerto Rican singer Lenny Tavárez, Colombian singer Feid and also Puerto Rican singers Wisin and Zion. The song was released on September 20, 2019, as the only single from the collaborative EP The Academy (2019).

== Music video ==
The music video for "Quizás" was released with the song on September 20, 2019 on Rich Music's YouTube channel.

== Charts ==
=== Weekly charts ===
Weekly chart performance for "Quizás"
Chart (2019)	Peak position
Argentina (Argentina Hot 100)	31
Spain (PROMUSICAE)	15
US Hot Latin Songs (Billboard)	41

== Certifications ==
Certifications for "Quizás"
Region	Certification	Certified units/sales
Spain (PROMUSICAE)	Platinum	60,000^{‡}
United States (RIAA)	7× Platinum (Latin)	420,000^{‡}
^{‡} Sales+streaming figures based on certification alone.
