= Pablo Ruiz (singer) =

Argentine singer

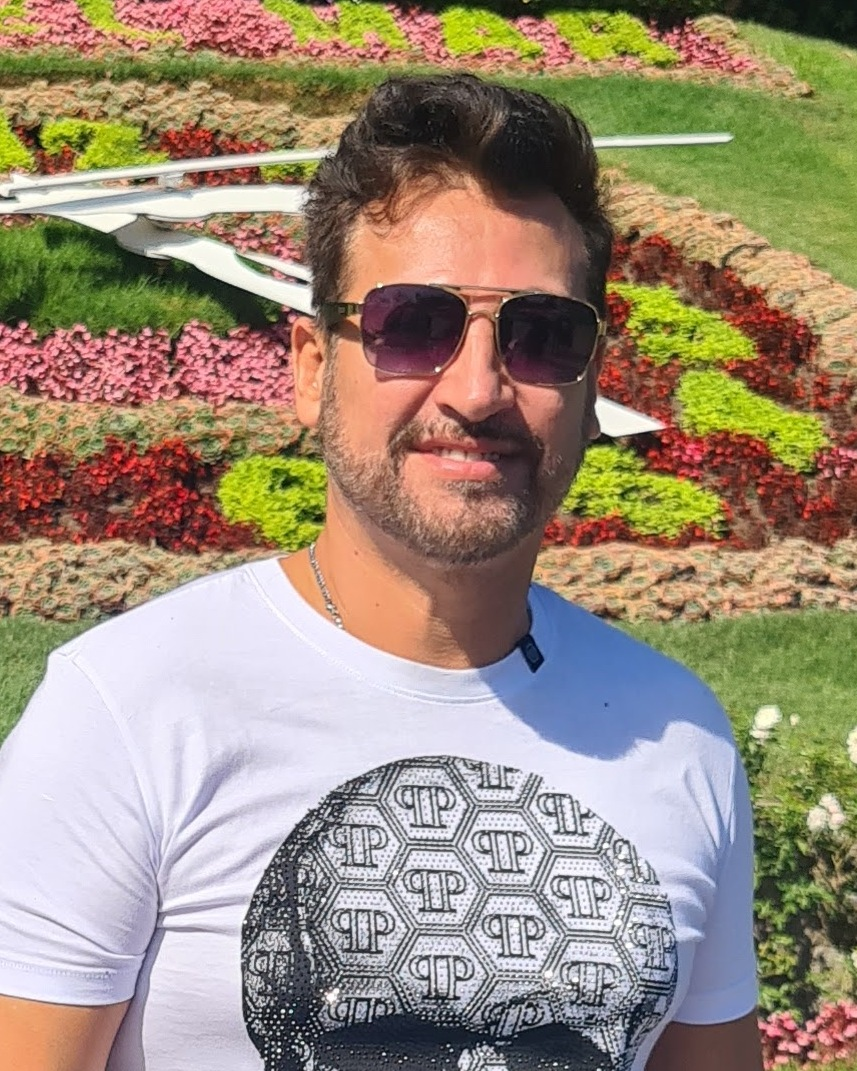

Background information
- Also known as: Pablito Ruiz
- Born: Pablo Maximiliano Miguel Coronel Vidoz; 4 May 1975 (age 51); Buenos Aires, Argentina
- Genres: Pop, romantic, dance
- Occupations: Actor, dancer, singer
- Instrument: Vocals
- Years active: 1987–present
- Label: Capitol Records

Pablo Maximiliano Miguel Coronel Vidoz, also known as Pablito Ruiz and Pablo Ruiz, born on (4 May 1975) in Buenos Aires, Argentina, is a singer, actor, and dancer. In 1989, when just 14 years old, he came to prominence with songs like "Proud Girl", "Lady Lady", "Linda", and his cover of Oh Mama.

After Ricky Martin came out as gay at the end of March 2010, Ruiz claimed in a TV interview with Viviana Canosa to have kissed Martin at a party in Mexico when he was 17 and Martin was around 22. Martin was working on the TV show Muñecos de Papel in Mexico at the time.

In 2014, Ruiz accused the Australian band Tame Impala of plagiarizing the song 'Océano' due to its similarities to Tame Impala's single 'Feels Like We Only Go Backwards'. Ruiz responded by saying he would consult his lawyers about possible legal action, although the accusers later claimed it was a joke.

Has sold more than 4 million albums. In his last incursion in music, he interpreted a song for the 2015 presidential candidate Daniel Scioli, (just one heartbeat).

== Discography ==
- 1987: Pablo Ruiz
- 1988: Un ángel
- 1989: Océano
- 1990: Espejos azules
- 1992: Irresistible
- 1994: 60/90
- 1997: Aire
- 1999: Was It Something That I Didn't Say?
- 2001: Jamás
- 2003: Necesito tus besos
- 2005: Demasiado tarde
- 2010: Renacer
