= The Academy (album) =

EP by Rich Music, Sech and Dalex featuring Justin Quiles, Lenny Tavárez and Feid
- Released: October 11, 2019
- Genre: Reggaeton
- Length: 28:17
- Label: Rich Music
- Producer: Dímelo Flow; Jowan; Pedro "SP" Polanco; Rike Mike; Simon; Swifft; Slow Mike; ICE; DVLP

Rich Music chronology
The Academy (2019)	The Academy: Segunda Misión (2024)

Sech chronology
Sueños (2019)	The Academy (2019)	1 of 1 (2020)

Dalex chronology
Climaxxx (2019)	The Academy (2019)	Modo Avión (2020)

Singles from The Academy
- 1. "Quizás" Released: September 20, 2019

The Academy is a collaborative EP by American record label Rich Music, Panamanian singer Sech and American singer Dalex featuring American singer Justin Quiles, Puerto Rican singer Lenny Tavárez and Colombian singer Feid, released on October 11, 2019, through Rich Music. The project was produced mainly by Dímelo Flow with producers Jowan, Pedro "SP" Polanco, Rike Mike, Simon, Swifft, Slow Mike, ICE and DVLP having production credits in some tracks. The EP also features collaborations with singers Wisin, Cazzu, De La Ghetto, Zion & Lennox and Mariah Angeliq.

The album peaked at number 11 at the Top Latin Albums chart and was certified platinum in United States.

== Background ==
The project is composed of seven tracks and is a collaborative EP of reggaeton singers Sech, Dalex, Justin Quiles, Lenny Tavárez and Feid with independent label Rich Music, of which all of them are signed to except Tavárez and Feid. The idea of the album was inspired by the Avengers, a fictional team of superheroes, and came during the recording of the remix for "Pa Mí", a song by Dalex that features artists like Sech and Lenny Tavárez, according to Rich Mendez, CEO of Rich Music, "when Flow, Lenny, and Dalex got together for the remix of "Pa Mí" and "Cuaderno", they gave each other the names of characters from The Avengers, playing around in the studio, this idea persisted and when Sech and Dalex entered the studio for their EP, the superhero concept took on a life of its own with each featured act bringing their own strength, The Avengers later morphed into The Academy".

== Singles ==
The song "Quizás" featuring Wisin and Zion from Zion & Lennox was released as a single on September 20, 2019, the song peaked at numbers 41 and 31 at the Hot Latin Songs and the Argentina Hot 100 charts, respectively, additionally, the single was certified platinum in United States in 2020.

== Track listing ==
The Academy track listing
No.	Title	Writer(s)	Producer(s)	Length
1.	"Quizás" (featuring Wisin and Zion)	Carlos Isaías Morales Williams; Pedro David Daleccio Torres; Justin Rafael Quiles; Julio Manuel González Távarez; Salomón Villada Hoyos; Jorge Valdés Vázquez; Juan Luis Morera Luna; Félix Ortiz; Johan Espinoza; Josh Mendez	Dímelo Flow; Jowan	3:36
2.	"Imagínate" (featuring Cazzu)	Morales Williams; Daleccio Torres; Quiles; González Tavárez; Villada Hoyos; Valdés Vásquez; Julieta Cazzuchelli; Pedro "SP" Polanco	Dímelo Flow; Pedro "SP" Polanco	3:45
3.	"Perreo en la Luna"	Morales Williams; Daleccio Torres; Quiles; González Tavárez; Villada Hoyos; Valdés Vásquez; Mendez; Manuel Enrique Cortes; Simon Restrepo	Dímelo Flow; Rike Music; Simon	3:38
4.	"Porno"	Morales Williams; Daleccio Torres; Quiles; González Tavárez; Villada Hoyos; Valdés Vásquez; Mendez; Jaime Ortiz	Dímelo Flow; Swifft	3:32
5.	"Uniforme" (featuring De la Ghetto and Zion & Lennox)	Morales Williams; Daleccio Torres; Quiles; González Tavárez; Villada Hoyos; Valdés Vásquez; Mendez; Rafael Castillo; Félix Ortiz; Gabriel Pizarro; Miguel Andrés Martinez Perea	Dímelo Flow; Slow Mike	4:39
6.	"Me Pregunta"	Morales Williams; Daleccio Torres; Quiles; González Tavárez; Villada Hoyos; Valdés Vásquez; Mendez	Dímelo Flow; ICE	4:05
7.	"Feel Me" (featuring Mariah Angeliq)	Morales Williams; Daleccio Torres; Quiles; González Tavárez; Villada Hoyos; Valdés Vásquez; Mendez; Polanco; Bigram J Zayas; Mariah Perez	Dímelo Flow; ICE; Pedro "SP" Polanco; DVLP	5:00
Total length:				28:17

== Charts ==
Weekly chart performance for The Academy
Chart (2019)	Peak position
US Top Latin Albums (Billboard)	11
US Latin Rhythm Albums (Billboard)	10

=== Year-end charts ===
Year-end chart performance for The Academy
Chart (2019)	Position
US Top Latin Albums (Billboard)	75

Year-end chart performance for The Academy
Chart (2020)	Position
US Top Latin Albums (Billboard)	66

== Certifications ==
Certifications for The Academy
Region	Certification	Certified units/sales
United States (RIAA)	Platinum (Latin)	60,000^{‡}
^{‡} Sales+streaming figures based on certification alone.
