= Pablo Ruiz (album) =

Studio album by Pablo Ruiz
- Released: 1987
- Recorded: January–February 1987
- Studio: Estudio ION
- Genre: Pop
- Language: Spanish
- Label: EMI Capitol
- Producer: Ruben Amado

Pablo Ruiz chronology
Pablo Ruiz (1987)	Un ángel (1987)

Pablo Ruiz is the first studio album by Argentine singer Pablo Ruiz. It was released in 1987.

== Track listing ==
- All songs written by Ruben Amado, except where noted. All arrangements by Mariano Barabino.
1. Bongiorno, My Love, Te Amo
2. Mi Locura Especial
3. Todo Por Tu Amor
4. Mi Chica Ideal
5. El Amor Está De Moda
6. Sol De Verano
7. Te Amo, Yo Te Amo (Liliana Maturano, Mariano Barabino)
8. Somos Jóvenes
9. Rock De La Inquietante Susy
10. Por Favor Ámame
