= MasterChef Celebrity (Argentine TV series) =

Argentine reality television show

- Genre: Baking, cooking
- Created by: Franc Roddam
- Directed by: Claudio Cuscuela
- Presented by: Santiago del Moro; Wanda Nara
- Judges: Donato De Santis; German Martitegui; Damián Betular
- Voices of: Claudia Fasolo
- Country of origin: Argentina
- Original language: Spanish
- No. of seasons: 3
- No. of episodes: 162

Production
- Executive producers: Gustavo N. Perednik (1st season); Nicolas Malowicki (2nd season)
- Producer: Diego Guebel
- Production location: Buenos Aires
- Running time: 90 minutes (week); 120 minutes (sunday)
- Production companies: BoxfishTV; Telefe

Original release
- Network: Telefe
- Release: 8 April 2018 – 11 March 2022
- Release: 13 October 2025 – present

MasterChef Celebrity Argentina is an Argentine gastronomy reality show contest produced by Boxfish TV for Telefe. It is the national variant of the television franchise MasterChef, in which only Argentine celebrities participate. The program is hosted by Wanda Nara and the contestants are evaluated by a jury made up of chefs Donato De Santis, Germán Martitegui and Damián Betular.

== Format ==
The tests that the participants will have to face are:

- Mystery box (initial test): the contestants will receive one or more ingredients that they must use in the dish to be cooked in some way, either in their own style or following the instructions or advice given by the jury. The two best dishes will be the captains of the next test. The best applicant will be rewarded in some way, usually with privileges such as not being expelled from that program or some advantage for subsequent tests.
- Creative challenge (initial test): the applicants will be limited to using a few ingredients, and with them they must cook the dish they decide on, trying to ensure that the proposed ingredients combine properly.
- Pressure test (initial test): the toughest test. An important star of the kitchen will visit the program, will show them one of his creations and they will have to reproduce it as faithfully as possible following the instructions and steps of the master.
- Team test: the contestants are divided into two teams, red and blue, choosing the captain of each of the members and the menu to cook among several exposed, starting the best of the initial test. The contestants must cook in an organized way to get all the dishes out on time.
- Elimination test: the team or contestants that have done the best in the previous test will be exempt from this test. The rest must cook the recipe indicated by the jury. They will "deliberate" and whoever has made the "worst" dish will leave the program.

Only one of the three initial test variations is performed in each program. All tests have a time limit established by the jury, and before starting the applicants have three minutes to stock up on ingredients from the "supermarket", except in the team test.

== First season (2020) ==
In mid-2020, Telefe confirmed that an edition of MasterChef Argentina would be held with characters known to the public; It was also announced that Santiago del Moro would be in charge of driving and that the influencer Flor Vigna would be in charge of presenting exclusive content for social networks. The chef Christophe Krywonis announced that he would not be part of the jury for this edition and that his place will be taken by Damián Betular, joining Donato De Santis and Germán Martitegui.

On September 26, it was confirmed that the reality show would air from October 5, from Monday to Thursday at 10:30 p.m. (GMT-3) and eliminations would be held on Sundays at the same time. During the afternoon of Friday, October 2, it was confirmed that the entertainment journalist, Marcelo Polino, would be in charge of commenting on the culinary reality show on the programs of Florencia Peña, Flor de Equipo, in the morning, on Verónica Lozano, Cortá por Lozano, in the afternoon and at Gerardo Rozín and Jésica Cirio, La Peña de Morfi on Sunday afternoons prior to the Elimination Gala.

On October 12, 2020, it was confirmed that "Polaco" Cwirkaluk had tested positive for COVID-19, with actress Natalie Pérez being announced as his replacement on October 18. Soon after, the positive of vedette Victoria Xipolitakis was added, who is replaced by model Christian Sancho. On October 20, it came to light that the jury Germán Martitegui had also tested positive for coronavirus, being replaced by Dolli Irigoyen.

On Monday, January 18, Claudia Villafañe was crowned the winner of this first season after beating Analía Franchín in the final.

=== Contestants ===
Contestant	Occupation	Status	
Claudia Villafañe	Television personality	Winner	
Analía Franchín	Television panelist	Runner-up	
El Polaco	Singer-songwriter	3rd Place	
Sofía Pachano	Actress and dancer	4th Place	
Vicky Xipolitakis	Model and vedette	5th Place	
Belén Lucius	Influencer	6th Place	
Leticia Siciliani	Actress	Quit	
El Mono	Kapanga vocalist	11th Evicted	2nd Evicted
Fede Bal	Theatre producer & television personality	10th Evicted	
Rocío Marengo	Model and television personality	9th Evicted	6nd Evicted
El Turco	Former footballer and manager	8th Evicted	
Boy Olmi	Filmmaker	7th Evicted	
Iliana Calabró	Actress and comedian vedette	5th Evicted	
Roberto Moldavsky	Comedian	4th Evicted	
Patricia Sosa	Singer-songwriter	3rd Evicted	
Nacho Sureda	Actor	1st Evicted	
Christian Sancho	Actor	Guest	
Natalie Pérez	Actress and singer-songwriter	Guest	

== Second season (2021) ==
On November 3, 2020, after the resounding success in terms of audience of the first season, Telefe renewed the program for a second season to premiere on February 22, 2021. On December 2, 2020, it was confirmed to the first participant of this edition, actress Carmen Barbieri, who had to be replaced during the first week by her son, first edition's contestant Fede Bal, due to COVID-19 infection. On February 3, and after Bal resigned to participate in place of her mother in the competition, Claudia Fontán was announced as a new participant to join from the second week of the competition. Filming began on January 25, and the show debuted on February 22. After eight weeks, Barbieri returned to the kitchen.

=== Contestants ===
Contestant	Occupation	Status	
Gastón Dalmau	Actor	Winner	
Georgina Barbarossa	Television host and comedian	Runner-up	
Sol Pérez	Model and television host	3rd Place	5th Evicted
Candela Vetrano	Actress and model	4th Place	
Claudia Fontán	Actress and television host	5th Place	
María O'Donnell	Radio broadcaster and writer	15th Evicted	
Álex Caniggia	Reality television star	14th Evicted	
Juanse	Ratones Paranoicos vocalist	13th Evicted	3rd Evicted
Dani La Chepi	Influencer	12th Evicted	
Carmen Barbieri	Former vedette & theatre director	11th Evicted	
Andrea Rincón	Model and vedette	10th Evicted	
Daniel Aráoz	Actor and comedian	9th Evicted	7th Evicted
Hernán Montenegro	Former basketballer	8th Evicted	
Fernando Carlos	Sports journalist	6th Evicted	
Flavia Palmiero	Television host and actress	4th Evicted	
CAE	Singer-songwriter	2nd Evicted	
Mariano Dalla Libera	Former footballer and manager	1st Evicted	
Fede Bal	Television personality and S1 contestant	Guest	

== Third season (2021/2022) ==
After the broadcast of the second season and after repeating the success of the previous season, Telefe renewed the program for a third season to premiere in November 2021. During the month of October, the journalist and ambassador of the reality Marcelo Polino was revealing and confirming, in the Flor de equipo program, the 16 official participants of the third edition of the cooking competition. That same month, the channel already began to promote the season with advertisements showing the contestants. Recordings began on October 19. More demanding and new challenges waited the new contestants.

They had to go through a different challenge every day, withstand the pressure of time and the demands of the judges to demonstrate their skills and thus remain in the contest and become the champion. Whoever succeeds will win 1,500,000 pesos.

The third season took place in a new, larger studio with state-of-the-art technology. The most famous kitchens in the country were renovated for the contestants to face original challenges. The tests surprised for their originality and, as in each edition, there were great guest stars for the special challenges.

During this edition, several replacements had to be made, who later became official contestants: Sabrina Garciarena for Marcela Acuña on the fourth week, Malena Guinzburg for Micaela Viciconte during the tenth, and Bárbara Vélez and Ernestina Pais for Denise Dumas and Joaquín Levinton, respectively.

=== Contestants ===
Contestant	Occupation	Status	
Micaela Viciconte	Sportswoman & television personality	Winner	
Tomás Fonzi	Actor	Runner-up	
Juariu	Influencer and journalist	3rd Place	7th Evicted
Denise Dumas	Former model and television host	4th Place	4th Evicted
María del Cerro	Actress and model	17th Evicted	
Malena Guinzburg	Comedian and actress	16th Evicted	Exempt
Paula Pareto	Olympic judoka	Quit	
Catherine Fulop	Actress	15th Evicted	
Joaquín Levinton	Turf vocalist and musician	14th Evicted	
Paulo Kablan	Police-article journalist	13th Evicted	
Ernestina Pais	Television host	12th Evicted	Exempt
Luisa Albinoni	Actress and former vedette	11th Evicted	
Bárbara Vélez	Actress and model	10th Evicted	Exempt
Marcela Acuña	Boxer	9th Evicted	6th Evicted
Charlotte Caniggia	Reality television star	8th Evicted	
Tití Fernández	Sports journalist and writer	5th Evicted	
Gastón Soffritti	Actor	3rd Evicted	
Héctor Enrique	Former footballer	2nd Evicted	
José Luis Gioia	Actor and comedian	1st Evicted	
Sabrina Garciarena	Actress and model	Guest	
