= María Laura Santillán =

Argentine news show host

María Laura Santillan
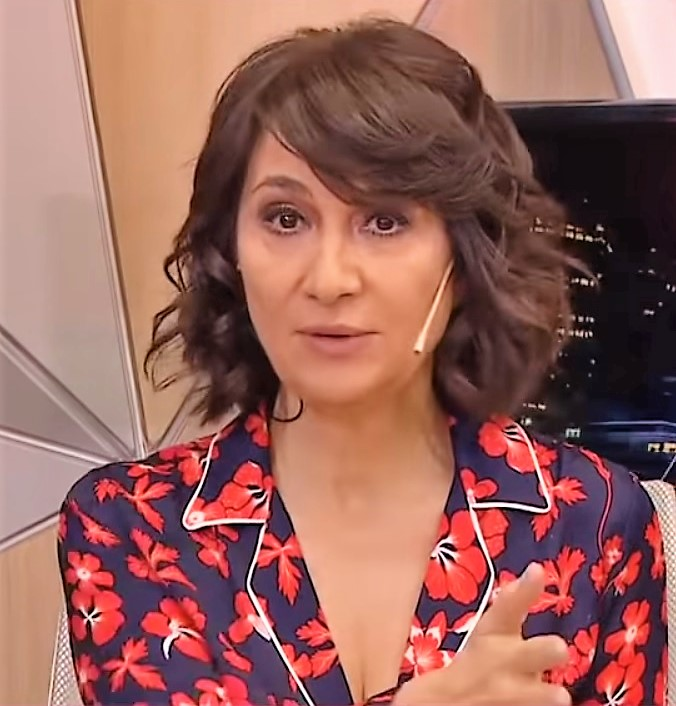
- Santillán on Todo Noticias in 2019
- Born: María Laura Santillan; 15 March 1962 (age 64)
- Occupations: Journalist and doctor
- Spouse: Carlos de Elía (1990-2009)
- Children: Josefina and Elena

María Laura Santillan (born 15 March 1962) is an Argentine journalist. She currently hosts "Argentina para armar" at Todo Noticias (TN), Sundays at night and from 2004 until December 2020 she hosted Telenoche, the most viewed news show in Argentina.
