= Renacer (Pablo Ruiz album) =

Studio album by Pablo Ruiz
- Released: 2010
- Recorded: 2008–2009
- Genres: Pop, dance-pop
- Language: Spanish
- Label: Pattaya

Pablo Ruiz chronology
Demasiado tarde (2005)	Renacer (2010)

Renacer (Spanish: Rebirth) is the twelfth studio album by Argentine singer Pablo Ruiz. It was released in 2010, coinciding with the celebration of the 25th anniversary of his career.

== Track listing ==
1. Ábreme Tu Ventana
2. Después De Ti
3. Quiero Verte
4. Lo Juro
5. Nostalgia
6. Yo Te Amo
7. Eres Tú
8. Mi Chica Ideal (New version)
9. Déjame Entrar En Tu Alma
10. Te Llevaré
11. No Te Escaparás
12. Oh Mamá, Ella Me Ha Besado (New version)
