= Wanda Nara =

Argentine model (born 1986)

- Wanda Nara
- Born: 10 December 1986 (age 39); Boulogne Sur Mer, Argentina
- Occupations: Model; television presenter
- Years active: 2005–present
- Spouse(s): Maxi López (m. 2008; div. 2013) Mauro Icardi (m. 2014; div. 2024)
- Children: 5
- Parent(s): Andrés Nara; Nora Colosimo
- Relatives: Zaira Nara (sister)

Wanda Nara (born 10 December 1986) is an Argentine model and television presenter.

== Early life ==
Nara was born on 10 December 1986 in Boulogne Sur Mer, Buenos Aires, to Andrés Nara and Nora Colosimo. She has a younger sister named Zaira.

== Career ==
Nara officially debuted on stage as a second vedette in the summer theatre season of 2005–2006 in the revue Humor en custodia. In the summer theatre season of 2006–2007, Nara was a vedette in the revue King Corona by Jorge Corona. She left the revue after two months due to alleged abuse from the comedian and his wife. After the scandal, which gave her much notoriety in the gossip magazines, Nara signed a contract with Showmatch's Patinando por un sueño, aired in August–December 2007, as contestant and soubrette.. In late 2009, Nara participated in El musical de tus sueños as a contestant achieving success. In May 2011, she became contestant in Bailando 2011, a contest Nara left to go to Italy with her then-husband Maxi López, and was replaced by her sister Zaira. In September 2018, she replaced Melissa Satta as co-presenter, showgirl, and opinionist of Tiki Taka, the sports talk show of Mediaset aired in the late night slot and hosted by Pierluigi Pardo. The program was aired in 2018, and also in 2020, on Italia 1, and aired in 2019 on Canale 5. The roles of Nara and Pardo in this program ended in March 2020 due to the COVID-19 pandemic, and in the next season (aired from September 2020 on Italia 1) they were replaced by Piero Chiambretti. In early 2020, Nara took part in the fourth season of Grande Fratello VIP (hosted by Alfonso Signorini and aired on Canale 5) as opinionist with Pupo. In September 2022, Nara became one of the four panelists in the first season of the Argentine talent ¿Quién es la máscara?. In February 2023, she became the new presenter of Masterchef Argentina..

On May 18th, 2026 Television personality Wanda Nara secured a major victory at the 54th annual Martín Fierro Awards, winning the statuette for Best Work in Female Hosting (Mejor Labor en Conducción Femenina). The Association of Argentine Television and Radio Journalists (APTRA) honored Nara for her role anchoring Telefe’s MasterChef Celebrity.

== Personal life ==
Nara married Maxi López on 28 May 2008; the marriage lasted until 6 November 2013. Nara and López divorced after López accused her of cheating on him, but she accused López of repeated marital infidelity. López and Nara have three sons: Valentino Gastón López Nara (born 25 January 2009 in Buenos Aires), Constantino López Nara (born December 18, 2010, in Catania), and Benedicto López Nara (born 20 February 2012 in Milan). Not long after her divorce, Nara, with her sons, left Italy to return to Buenos Aires and began a relationship with Mauro Icardi.

Icardi knew Nara during his friendship with López when they played during the 2012–13 Serie A in the same team (Sampdoria). The following season, during the April 2014 Serie A match between Lopez's Sampdoria and Icardi's Inter, López notably refused to shake Icardi's hand, leading the international press to dub the game Wanda Derby. Nara and Icardi subsequently married on 27 May 2014 with a small ceremony in Buenos Aires, and a big wedding party on 7 June 2014 which attracted the attention of the international press. In April 2016, López, repeated the story of Wanda Derby by again refusing to shake his hand during a Serie A match. Nara and Icardi have two daughters: Francesca Icardi Nara, who was born 19 January 2015 in Milan, and Isabella Icardi Nara, who was born 27 October 2016 in Milan.

On 16 October 2021, Nara wrote a message on Instagram seemingly directed at her husband Icardi. The message said that María Eugenia Suárez had "ruined another family for being a slut", referring to La China Suárez, now well-known scandal in a motorhome with Benjamín Vicuña, while they were filming the movie El Hilo Rojo (The Red Thread; 2016). The following day, Wanda left Paris for Milan, the family's former home until 2019, with her five children. Later, the two spouses reconciled, and Nara and her five children returned to live with Icardi. Nara announced the end of their marriage almost a year later on 22 September 2022 in Instagram Stories. Two months later, Nara and Icardi were back together, before once again splitting a month later. Their on-again, off-again relationship continued with another reconciliation in 2023. Nara announced her definitive separation in July 2024 as Icardi wanted to move in with "La China Suarez" during his knee injury recovery time. But regardless of the media reports, Wanda is not yet legally divorced from Mauro Icardi. As of May 2026, they are in the middle of a turbulent divorce in Milan, Italy.

The divorce between Wanda Nara and former Galatasaray striker Mauro Icardi was formally finalized by a Milan court on Thursday, October 8, 2026

== Television ==
Year	Title	Role	Notes
2005	(Argentina) Sin código	Veronica	
2006	(Argentina) Casados con hijos	Novicia Bernanda	Episode: "Las novicias rebeldes"
2007	(Argentina) Patinando por un sueño	Herself	11th eliminated (season 1)
2009	(Argentina) El Musical de tus Sueños	Herself	5th eliminated
2011	(Argentina) Bailando por un Sueño	Herself	Withdrew (season 7)
2013	(Argentina) La pelu	Anabelle	
2017	(Argentina) Golpe al corazón	Guadalupe	
2018	(Argentina) Especiales Musicales de Morfi	Herself	Guest co-host
2018–2020	(Italy) Tiki Taka - Il calcio è il nostro gioco	Herself	Co-host
2019	(Argentina) Por el mundo	Herself	Guest co-host
2020	(Italy) Grande Fratello VIP	Herself	Opinionist (season 4)
2022	(Argentina) ¿Quién es la máscara?	Herself	Investigator
2022–2023	(Italy) Ballando con le Stelle	Herself	Guest celebrity (series 17); winner (series 18)
2022	(Argentina) Gran Hermano	Herself	Guest co-host (season 10)
2023	MasterChef Argentina	Herself	Host
2024	(Italy) L'acchiappatalenti	Herself	Talent hunter
2024	Bake Off Famosos Argentina	Herself	Host
2024–TBA	Love Is Blind: Argentina	Herself	Host, season 2 upcoming
2025	(Italy) Sognando... Ballando con le stelle	Herself	VIP winner (season 1)
2025–TBA	MasterChef Celebrity Argentina	Herself	Host (season 4)
TBA	(Argentina) Wanda Nara: La Serie	Herself	Lead role, season 1 upcoming

== Discography ==
=== Singles ===
List of singles as lead artist
Title	Year	Album
"Bad Bitch"	2023	Non-album singles
"O Bicho Vai Pegar"	2024	Non-album singles
"Money"	2024	Non-album singles
"Amor Verdadero" (solo or with L-Gante)	2024	Non-album singles
"Ibiza"	2024	Non-album singles
