= Viviana Canosa =

Argentine journalist and television-radio host (born 1971)

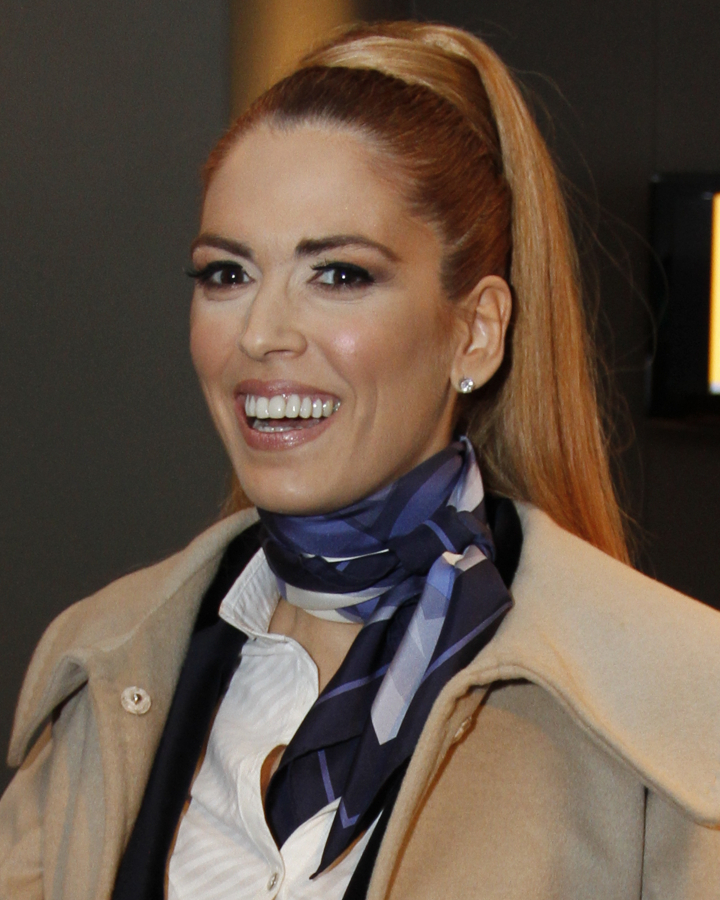
Viviana Canosa

Viviana Canosa (born 30 March 1971) is an Argentinian journalist and television-radio host. She is known for her support for conservative ideas against abortion and feminism.

Canosa was born in Buenos Aires. She started her career in 1995 on the sports TV Channel TyC Sports, and then she worked alongside Samuel Gelblung in the show Memoria broadcast on Canal 9. Her recognition started as a member of the staff of the chat show Intrusos en el espectáculo between 2001 and 2002 in América TV, when she decided to start her own chat show to compete with Intrusos en el espectáculo: Los profesionales de siempre in Canal 9. She was a key figure of that channel, always focused on shows about gossip journalism with some shows about current events in Argentina.

Her show Los profesionales de siempre lasted until 2013 with the name Más Viviana, alternating between gossip journalism and news of general interest. In 2015 she started a program of interviews for the broadcaster TN named El futuro presidente interviewing the presidential candidates of Argentina in 2015. In 2019 she started a TV show focused in politics Nada personal where she strongly criticized the government of Alberto Fernández and the management of the COVID-19 pandemic. She was accused of spreading misinformation about the disease that supported conspiracy theories after drinking chlorine dioxide on live TV.

She endorsed the candidature of Javier Milei as president of Argentina in 2023, but became critical of him shortly after.
