= Bárbara Vélez =

Argentine model and actress

Barbie Velez
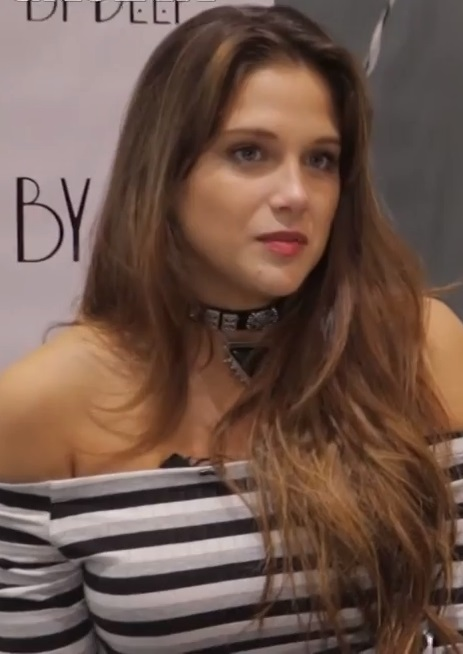
- Born: Bárbara Pucheta Vélez; 18 June 1994 (age 32); Quilmes, Buenos Aires, Argentina
- Occupations: actress, model
- Spouse: Lucas Rodríguez (2021-present)
- Children: Salvador (2023-present)

Bárbara Pucheta Vélez (born 18 June 1994), also known as Barbie Vélez, is an Argentine actress, model and TV host.

== Biography ==
She was born in the neighborhood of Quilmes, in Buenos Aires. She is the daughter of Alejandro Pucheta and the vedette Nazarena Vélez. She has two younger brothers on her mother's side, Gonzalo and Thiago.

== Career ==
Vélez debuted at the age of 17 working for clothing brands, in the summer of 2011, for one of the works by Gerardo Sofovich and René Bertrand, Flor de pito, playing Lola Minicicci.

In 2012, she plays the character of a "fan" in Pedro Afonso's theatrical comedy Bachelorette Party.

She made her television debut in 2013 in the soap opera Los Grimaldi: una familia de locos, produced by her mother Nazarena Vélez and broadcast by elnueve, she also participated in the plays of this soap opera. She was one of the co-stars of the comedy play Family of Women, along with the actresses Luisa Kuliok, Haydée Padilla, Gladys Florimonte, Luisa Albinoni, Dalma Maradona and Ernestina Pais, among others.

In 2014 she appears in the telenovela Somos familia starring Gustavo Bermúdez and Ana María Orozco, where Barbie plays the character of Olivia Navarro González, the daughter of Pablo Navarro and Mabel González, played respectively by Fabián Vena and Adriana Salonia, broadcast by Telefe. In the same year she was invited to Your face sounds familiar 2 on several occasions.

In the 2015 she participates in the Dancing for a dream 2015 along with Ignacio Pérez Cortés, becoming one of the ten finalists. She also worked in Esperanza mía playing Milagros del Pombo, secretary of Máximo Ortiz (Tomás Fonzi).

In 2016 she participated again in the Dancing for a dream in his eleventh season this time together with Maximiliano Buitrago, again becoming among the top ten. In 2018 she made a special participation in Millennials as Paula. She was a participant in Famous Dressmaking, achieving recognition by the juries for her modern ideas when designing garments. And in 2022 she replaced Denise Dumas in the Argentine version of Celebrity MasterChef to later become the main participant.

== Filmography ==
=== Series ===
Year	Title	Role	Notes
2013	Los Grimaldi: una familia de locos	Daniela Grimaldi	
2014	Somos familia	Olivia Navarro Gonzalez	
2015–2016	Esperanza mía	Milagros del Pompo	
2016	Si solo si	Ludmila	
2017–2018	Golpe al corazón	Camila Mansilla	
2018	Pasado de Copas [Drunk History]	Blanca Luz Brum	Episode: «Neruda, García Lorca y Blanca Luz»
2019–2019	Millennials	Paula	
2026	Cómo deshacerse de una estrella de fútbol	Renata Monsegur	Web series

=== Film ===
Year	Title	Role	Notes
2014	Chicos católicos, apostólicos y romanos	Barbie	
2014	Cosano, la vida secreta de un vestido	Herself	
2019	Te pido un taxi	Ingrid	
2023	El asistente	Mónica	

=== Realities shows ===
Year	Title	Role	Notes
2015, 2016	Bailando por un Sueño	Contestant	10th place; season 10 10th place; season 11
2020	Divina comida	Contestant	Runner-up
2021	Corte y confección Famosos	Contestant	9th place
2022	MasterChef Celebrity Argentina	Contestant	13th place; season 3

=== Programs ===
Year	Title	Role	Notes
2024	Ultra Vip	Host	Web show
2025-presente	Story Time	Co-host	Web show
