= The Light Cinemas =

British cinema chain

The Light Cinemas Group Ltd.
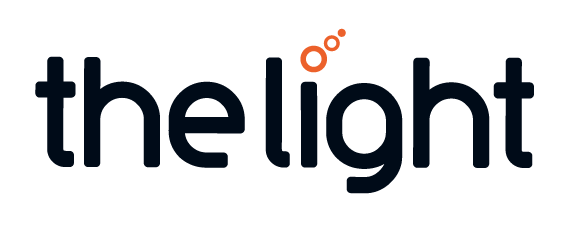
- Type: Limited Company
- Industry: Entertainment (movie theatres)
- Founded: 2007
- Founders: John Sullivan; Keith Pullinger
- Headquarters: London, England, UK
- Number of locations: 14 cinemas (2025)
- Key people: James Morris (Chief Executive)
- Owner: Luke Johnson (businessman)
- Website: https://www.thelight.co.uk/

The Light Cinemas (stylised as the light), is a British independent cinema chain, founded in 2007 by former Cineworld director Keith Pullinger and former Warner Village Cinemas director John Sullivan. The oldest UK cinema in the chain is currently in New Brighton, which opened in December 2011. Since then, thirteen more venues have opened across the UK, while the company has also been involved in cinema exhibition internationally, in Bulgaria, Germany, and Saudi Arabia.

The cinema chain offers screenings of both mainstream and independent films exclusively with digital cinema technology. Their venues also include a café/bar, and some include entertainment facilities such as bowling, karaoke, climbing, and retro arcades. The Light offers Premiere cards, which allow subscribers to view films for a flat monthly fee.

== Brand ==
The Light initially sought to compete with its major rivals by taking advantage of digital projection technology, which is comparatively cheaper than traditional film stock projection. The chain is exclusively digital, meaning that it can also broadcast sports, live theatre, music and opera performances. Additionally, Pullinger has argued that digital screening gives The Light a 'flexibility' to choose between showing more, different films and showing the same film on several screens simultaneously.

The Light also pitches itself as a "community" cinema. It offers an alternative to the traditional multiplex concept, focusing on customer comfort, and criticising larger chains for being "locked into Hollywood blockbusters". The Light regularly show films in various languages depending on local demographics, and champion accessible cinema with regular screenings featuring audio description, subtitles, and that cater to the needs of those with dementia or autism. In the spring of 2019, The Light did screenings of a variety of anime films, including some from Studio Ghibli.

As part of their attempts to create what Pullinger described as a "cinema environment that feels luxurious, with plenty of atmosphere and personality", The Light cinemas have a café/bar incorporated into the venue. For example, in the Bolton venue that opened in 2016 they included large murals depicting heroic movie characters, and designed their furniture to have a rough finish in a nod to the town's industrial heritage. From 2022, the chain started offering new facilities in some of its venues, such as bowling, mini-golf, interactive darts, climbing facilities and karaoke.

== History ==
Founded in 2007 by Keith Pullinger and John Sullivan, The Light opened its first UK venue in December 2011 in New Brighton, followed later by a second venue in Wisbech in May 2014.

The cinema chain made national headlines in 2015, when they successfully raised the £5.2 million needed to purchase a nine-screen multiplex in Cambridge from rival company Cineworld. The latter had been forced to sell the venue following a Competition Commission ruling.

At this point in January 2015, they had already signed new lease agreements in Bolton, Sheffield, Thetford, Dundee, Stockport and Walsall. While the Dundee site eventually fell through as negotiations with the local shopping centre fell apart, the other five venues successfully opened over the next three years. Two more sites, in Addlestone and Bradford, opened in 2018, bringing their total in the UK up to 10.

=== COVID-19 pandemic and reopening ===
Following the nationwide UK COVID-19 lockdown in March 2020, cinemas across the country were forced to close. They were briefly able to reopen from August 2020, but following the imposition of a second and later a third lockdown in England, they were forced to close again.

In May 2021, fourteen months after their initial closure, The Light cinemas were able to open again. This month also saw them open their eleventh UK venue in Sittingbourne.

The economic impacts of the coronavirus pandemic also hurt the chain's hopes of opening a venue in Nottingham. Plans in the city fell apart when shopping centre company Intu, leaders on the transformation project, went into administration in June 2020 due to the pandemic.

Despite this setback, Pullinger maintained that The Light was "actively seeking" a venue in Nottingham, with the chain offering an ‘expanded’ offering to new sites. This included not just cinema screenings, a café and bar, but also bowling, mini-golf, interactive darts, climbing facilities and karaoke. The first site to offer these new facilities was based in Banbury, and opened in 2022. In 2023, the chain’s 13th site was opened in Redhill, Surrey, including these facilities and also introducing for the first time axe throwing, curling and duckpin bowling.

=== 2024 acquisition ===
In October 2024, The Light was acquired by hospitality entrepreneur Luke Johnson, who had worked with Pizza Express and Gail's. The acquisition was led by his firm Risk Partners Capital, alongside the investment company Melcorpo. The new owners announced a plan to invest more than £15 million in order to double the size of the business in the next three years.

In April 2025, a 14th venue was opened in Huddersfield, four years after Kirklees Council loaned Kingsgate Leisure owners WD Limited £7 million to develop a cinema in the shopping centre.

=== Future locations ===
A venue in Colchester was announced in 2020, as part of the 'Tollgate Village' development project in Tollgate West, near Stanway, Essex. The cinema was originally slated to be finished by the end of 2021. In June 2021 the directors of the firm responsible for the development said that they "hope to commence building next year [2022]". As of June 2023, this development was expected to go ahead, although with no clear completion date set.

In April 2026, The Times reported that a deal where The Light would acquire rival Showcase Cinemas was "at a relatively advanced stage". The deal would result in the acquisition of 16 additional sites, making The Light the fourth-largest cinema chain in the UK, after Vue, Odeon, and Cineworld.

== Locations ==
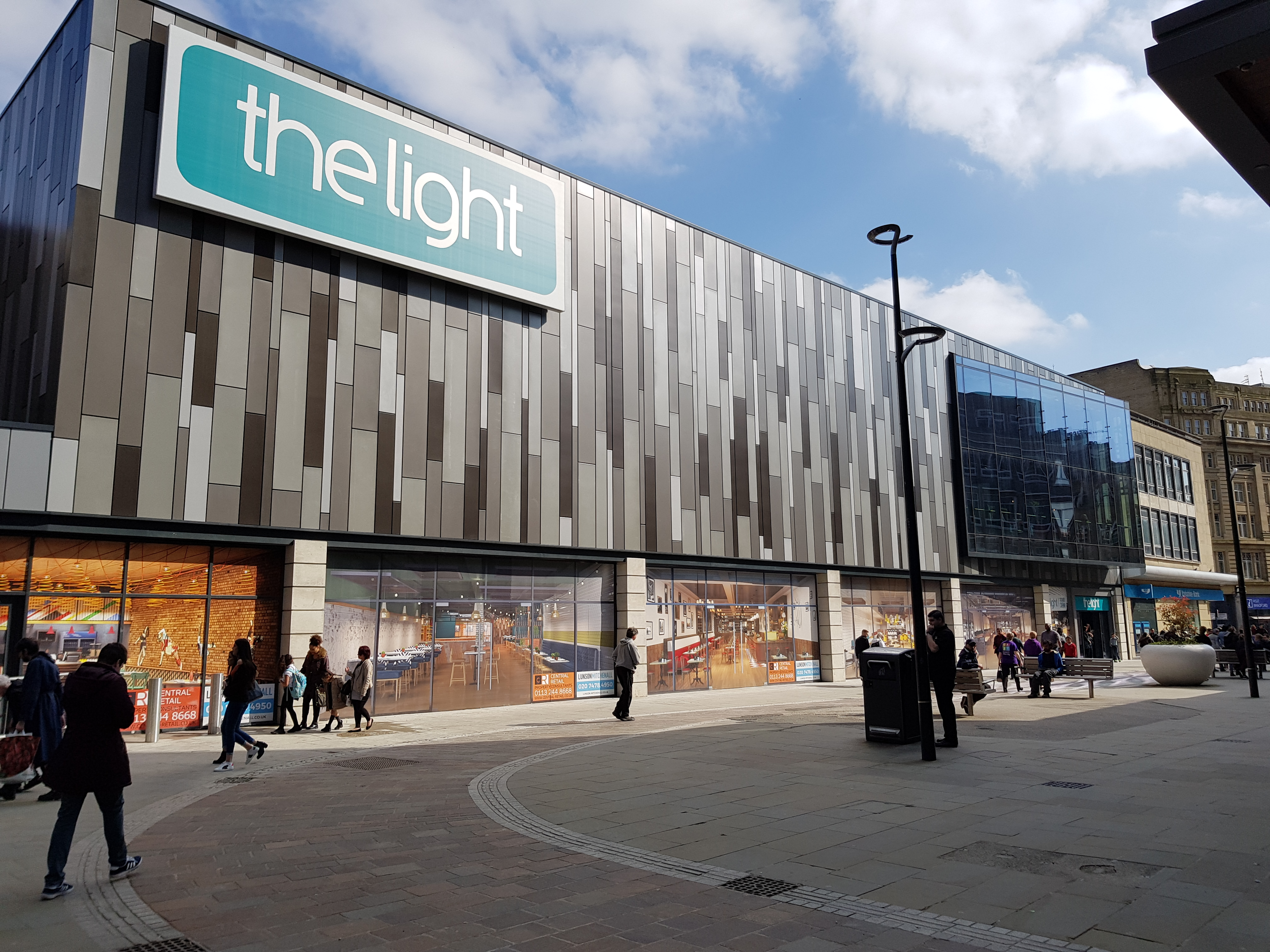
The outside of the Light Cinema in the Broadway, Bradford on May 4, 2018

| Location | Screens | Date opened | Notes |
|---|---|---|---|
| Addlestone | 6 | 5 Oct 2018 | |
| Banbury | 7 | 10 Jun 2022 | |
| Bolton | 9 | 7 Oct 2016 | |
| Bradford | 6 | 11 May 2018 | |
| Cambridge | 9 | 30 Jan 2015 | Venue purchased from Cineworld |
| Huddersfield | 6 | 11 April 2025 | |
| New Brighton | 8 | 2 Dec 2011 | |
| Redhill | 6 | 16 Jun 2023 | |
| Sheffield | 9 | 14 Apr 2017 | |
| Sittingbourne | 8 | 28 May 2021 | |
| Stockport | 12 | 24 Nov 2017 | |
| Thetford | 3 | 2 Dec 2016 | |
| Walsall | 8 | 18 Mar 2016 | |
| Wisbech | 8 | 23 May 2014 | |

== International expansion ==
=== In Europe ===
After its founding in 2007, the first venues that the company opened were not in the UK. Before the opening of its New Brighton venue in 2011, The Light had opened a cinema in Bucharest, Romania in 2008, and another venue in Halle, Germany in 2009. The Romanian part of the company dissolved in 2015, and Pullinger announced that the venue in Germany would be closed in July 2021 due to financial pressures caused by the coronavirus pandemic.

=== Saudi Arabia ===
In March 2019, The Light 'made history' by being awarded an operating license to exhibit films in the Kingdom of Saudi Arabia. This was done in cooperation with the London-based cinema consultancy firm The Big Picture, of which both Sullivan and Pullinger were founding partners, and in partnership with the FAHG Saudi fashion retail group run by Fawaz Alhokair, with venues being integrated into FAHG-owned shopping centres. The brand name used in Saudi Arabia is MUVI, and it is described as Saudi Arabia's first home-grown cinema brand, founded only a year after the Kingdom lifted a thirty-five year ban on cinemas.

This sparked controversy due to the international backlash against Saudi Arabia following the government's murder of Saudi journalist Jamal Khashoggi in October 2018. In response, Pullinger argued that the fallout from Khashoggi's murder was "for politicians to deal with", and that "Saudi Arabia represents the biggest opportunity for box office growth in the world". The Light claimed that it was one of only five companies to qualify for the Saudi government’s operating license at the time. By the end of 2021, MUVI cinemas had successfully opened 21 locations across the country, alongside investing in film distribution and film production.
