= Ruggeri =

Origin
- Language: Italian
- Region of origin: Italy, South America

Ruggeri is a surname. Notable people with the surname include:

- Alessandro Ruggeri (born 1990), Italian footballer
- Andrea Ruggeri (born 1982), Italian international relations scholar
- Candela Ruggeri (born 1992), Argentine model
- Cinzia Ruggeri (1942–2019), Italian designer and artist
- Davide Ruggeri (born 1999), Italian rugby union player
- Don Ruggeri (born c. 1939), American retired football coach
- Enrico Ruggeri (born 1957), Italian singer-songwriter
- Fabrizio Ruggeri, Italian statistician
- Guido Ruggeri, Italian engraver
- Matteo Ruggeri (born 2002), Italian footballer
- Oscar Ruggeri (born 1962), Argentine footballer
- Paola Ruggeri (born 1961), Miss Venezuela 1983
- Paul Ruggeri (born 1988), American gymnast
- Ruggero Ruggeri (1871–1953), Italian actor
- Stephan Ruggeri (born 1996), Argentine footballer
- Telemaco Ruggeri (1876–1957), Italian actor and film director
- Teresa Ruggeri (born 1972), Italian operatic soprano
- Valerio Ruggeri (1934–2015), Italian actor and voice actor
- Rugeri or Ruggeri, 17th-century family of Italian violin makers

== See also ==
- Ruggieri
