= Lourdes Cecilia Fernández =

Cecilia Lourdes Fernández
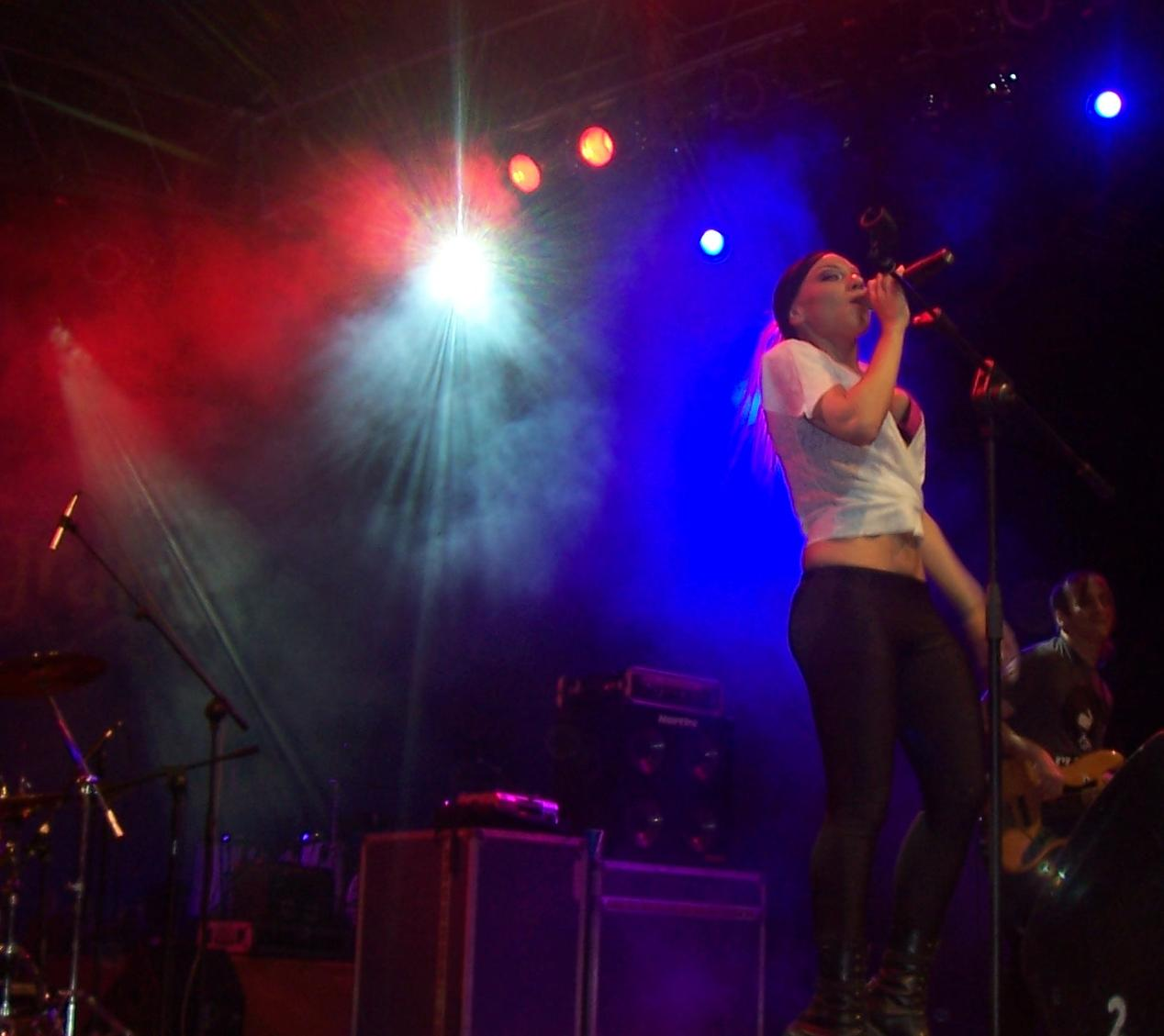
- Fernández at the Immigrant's Festival.

Background information
- Also known as: Lula, Lou
- Born: Cecilia Lourdes Fernández; 2 April 1981 (age 44); Buenos Aires, Argentina
- Genres: Pop, reggae, ska
- Occupations: Singer-songwriter, composer, actress
- Years active: 2001–present
- Labels: Sony BMG (2001–04, 2008–present); EMI (2004–08)
- Website: web.archive.org/web/20080822121212/http://www.lourdesweb.com.ar/index-flash.html

Cecilia Lourdes Fernández (Spanish pronunciation: [seˈsilja ˈlowɾðes feɾˈnandes]; born 2 April 1981) is an Argentine singer-songwriter, composer and actress. She is the best known as a member of Argentine girl group Bandana and as a frontman of Lourdes, a band that carries her name.

== Career ==
=== Bandana (2001—2004) ===
As a student, Fernández was a member of two bands, Terikitungo and Seres Humanos. She was a student of Teatro Colón in Buenos Aires. As a player of piano and electronic keyboards, Fernández became composing music on a computer program, which helped her to create more modern sound. In 2001, she went on an audition for talents show Popstars, which selected five girls for a girl group — Ivonne Guzmán, Valeria Gastaldi, Virginia Da Cunha, Lissa Vera and Fernández. As their emergence coincided with a period of nationwide economic depression, one of the series judges commented "this was an opportunity to shine at a very downbeat moment for Argentina". During the Popstars, Fernández was known as "la peti" ("shorty"), which was commented by judge Afo Verde that "appearance didn't matter to us, what each girl conveyed was most important". The band was named Bandana.

Bandana's first album, Bandana, was the best-selling album of Argentina in 2001 and achieved four platinum certifications. Later in 2002, they recorded a Spanish version of "Can't Help Falling in Love" by Elvis Presley, "Muero De Amor Por Ti", for the Disney film Lilo & Stitch. In December, Bandana performed with Mambrú at the José Amalfitani Stadium in front of over 40 thousands spectators. In 2003, Bandana became the first Argentine artist to cover Billboard magazine, while promoting themselves in the United States. After a film Vivir Intentando in 2003, which received mixed reviews, and 2004 album Hasta Siempre, Bandana disbanded. They reunited in 2008 for an episode of the show of Susana Giménez.

=== Lourdes (2004—present) ===
Shortly after Bandana disbanded, Fernández formed her own band Lourdes with Hernán "Pájaro" Ripoll, who plays bass guitar and synthesizer, and Federico Casañas, who plays drums. In 2004, they signed with EMI and released album Televisivamente. Unlike pop and dance-pop music Bandana played, Lourdes focused on electropop, reggae and ska. Lourdes' debut single "Televisivamente" picked at number four at Argentine Singles Chart, but the other two did not enter the chart. Their second album, De otro mundo, picked at number one at Argentine Albums Chart, while its singles "De otro mundo" and "Yo te hacía bien" were number one singles. Lourdes will release her third album in 2010 through Sony BMG.

== Discography ==
=== Albums ===
- 2004 — Televisivamente
- 2007 — De otro mundo
- 2010 — Third Studio Album

=== Singles ===
| Year | Single | Argentina Chart | Album |
|---|---|---|---|
| 2004 | "Televisivamente" | 4 | Televisivamente |
| 2005 | "Tengo que volver" | – | Televisivamente |
| 2005 | "Hi Hi Hit (Cenizas en el mar)" | – | Televisivamente |
| 2007 | "De otro mundo" | 1 | De otro mundo |
| 2008 | "Yo te hacía bien" | 1 | De otro mundo |

== Filmography ==
| Year | Title | Format | Role | Notes |
|---|---|---|---|---|
| 2001 | Popstars: Argentina | Reality/Talents Show | Herself | |
| 2002 | 1000 millones | TV series | Herself | Guest Appearance |
| 2002 | Rebelde Way | TV series | Herself | Guest Appearance |
| 2003 | Vivir Intentando | Film | Herself | |

== Awards and nominations ==
| Year | Award | Category | Result | Notes |
|---|---|---|---|---|
| 2002 | MTV Video Music Awards Latin America | Best New Artist | Won | With Bandana |
| 2002 | CAPIF Awards | Best Music Publishing | Nominated | With Bandana |
| 2002 | CAPIF Awards | Best New Artist | Nominated | With Bandana |
| 2002 | CAPIF Awards | Best Pop Band | Nominated | With Bandana |
| 2003 | CAPIF Awards | Best Pop Album | Nominated | With Bandana |
| 2004 | CAPIF Awards | Best Pop Album | Nominated | With Bandana |
| 2005 | Premios Gardel | Best New Female Artist | Nominated | |
| 2005 | Premios Gardel | Best New Pop Artist | Nominated | |
| 2005 | MTV Video Music Awards Latin America | Best New Artist | Nominated | |
| 2005 | Clarín Awards | Best New Artist | Nominated | |
| 2006 | Latinos Awards | Best Female Artist | Nominated | |
| 2008 | Premios Gardel | Best Album by a Female Pop Artist | Nominated | |
