= El Hotel De Los Famosos season 2 =

El Hotel De Los Famosos
- Season 2
- Presented by: Galas; Carolina Ardohain; Leandro Leunis; Digital host Locho Loccisano

Release
- Original network: El Trece
- Original release: 9 January – 10 April 2023

Season chronology
- ← Previous; El hotel de los famosos (season 1)

The second season of El hotel de los famosos is a reality show on El Trece, in which celebrities undergo a four-month confinement in a hotel without access to the outside.

== Hosts and managers ==
- Hosts
  - Pampita and Leandro Leunis present the galas where the challenges that the participants must face and the eliminations, among other things, will be known.
  - Locho Loccisano is the digital host in charge of the program's social networks.
- Managers
  - Gabriel Oliveri, hotel manager
  - José María Muscari, emotional coach
  - Juan Miceli, in charge of the gardens
  - Christian Petersen, kitchen manager

== Format ==
The rules and the format of the game remain the same as El hotel de los famosos (season 1)

New/changed rule

- Each week there will be a "super guest" who will be chosen by the Manager on Duty, giving the Guest their own room with a private bathroom, access to the minibar at any time, a prominent robe, and can also get up at any time. Said Super Guest must choose a member of the staff to take care of their requests for 24 hours.
  - The winner of the guest challenge, in addition to winning the suit, will obtain immunity for all against all.
  - The Legacy: every time a person is eliminated, that is, when they lose the Duel in H, they must leave a secret vote against a partner that will be revealed in the "All against All"

== Participants ==
A total of 16 participants entered the Hotel in episode 1.

Contestants
Contestant	Status	Previous status	Duels in H
(Uruguay) Abigail Pereira Actress	Abandoned; Episode 3		0
(Argentina) Érica García Singer	Medically evacuated Episode 9		1
(Argentina) Marian Farjat Model and TV personality	3rd eliminated Episode 15		1
(Argentina) Alejo Ortiz Actor	4th eliminated Episode 20		1
(Argentina) Juanma Martino Actor	Expelled; Episode 23		1
(Dominican Republic) Mimí Alvarado Panelist	6th eliminated Episode 29	1st eliminated Episode 5	2
(Argentina) Federico Barón Actor	8th eliminated Episode 39		1
(Argentina) Charlotte Caniggia Reality TV star	Abandoned; Episode 42	Abandoned; Episode 7	0
(Argentina) Flori Ventura Host and model	Abandoned; Episode 43		1
(Argentina) Rocío Marengo TV personality	Abandoned; Episode 49	9nd eliminated Episode 43	3
(Argentina) Rocío Marengo TV personality	Abandoned; Episode 49	2nd eliminated Episode 10	3
(Argentina) Flor Moyano Influencer and model	11th eliminated Episode 54		1
(Argentina) Axel Neri Model	Medically evacuated Episode 57		0
(Argentina) Emiliano Rella Presenter	12/13th eliminated Episode 59		1
(Argentina) Enzo Aguilar Influencer	12/13th eliminated Episode 59		4
(Argentina) Yasmín Corti Dancer	6th place Episode 60	7th eliminated Episode 34	2
(Argentina) Yasmín Corti Dancer	6th place Episode 60	5th eliminated Episode 24	2
(Venezuela) Fernando Carrillo Actor	5th place Episode 61	10th eliminated Episode 49	4
(Argentina) Damián Ávila Sportsman and model	4th place Episode 62		0
(Argentina) Delfina Gérez Bosco TV presenter	3th place Episode 63		1
(Argentina) Martín Coggi Former boxer	Runner-up		2
(Argentina) Sebastián Cobelli Former Footballer	Winner		1

== Weekly accommodation ==
- ^{C}: Captain
- ♦ - Best Staff
- 𝄫 - Worst Staff

	Week											
	1	2	3	4	5	6	7	8	9	10	11	12
Guests	Sebastián	Sebastián	Flor	Flor ^{C}	Delfina ^{C}	Delfina ^{C}	Flori	Charlotte	~~Charlotte~~	Sebastián	Delfina	Lissa
Guests	Erica	~~Erica~~	Flori	Flori	Flori	Martín	Martín	Flor	Flor	Flor	Damián	Kate
Guests	Fernando	Federico	Federico ^{C}	Alejo	Emiliano	Emiliano	Emiliano	Emiliano	Emiliano	Fernando	Fernando	Monica
Guests	Flor	Martín ^{C}	Fernando	Fernando	Sebastián	Fernando ^{C}	Fernando	Sebastián	Flori ^{C}	Enzo ^{C}	Enzo ^{C}	Walter
Guests	Juanma	Juanma ^{C}	Juanma	Sebastián	Martín		Sebastián	Martín	Fernando	Martín	Martín	
Guests	Marian	Alejo	Delfina	Martín			Flor	Enzo	Sebastián			
Guests	Rocío ^{C}	Rocío					Federico					
Guests	Emiliano						Damián					
Staff	Enzo	Enzo	Enzo	Enzo	Flor	Flor	Axel 𝄫	Axel	Axel	Axel	Axel	~~Axel~~
Staff	Mimí 𝄫	Mimí 𝄫	Mimí	Mimí 𝄫	Mimí	Sebastián ^{C}	Yasmín	Federico	Damián	Damián ^{C}	Flor	Enzo
Staff	Delfina ♦	Delfina ♦	Alejo	Delfina ^{C}	Federico ^{C}	Mimí	~~Mimí~~	Damián	Martín ^{C}	Emiliano 𝄫	Emiliano	Emiliano
Staff	Martín ^{C}	Emiliano	Emiliano 𝄫	Emiliano	Enzo	Enzo ^{C}	~~Magali~~	Flori	Enzo	Yasmín ♦	Yasmín ♦ ^{C}	Delfina ^{C}
Staff	Alejo	Flor	Sebastián	Juanma	~~Juanma~~	Federico ^{C}	Rocío	Rocío	Rocío 𝄫	Rocío	Sebastián	Martín
Staff	Federico	Fernando	Martín ^{C}	Federico ♦	Fernando ♦	Flori	~~Alejo~~	Delfina	Delfina ♦	Delfina		Yasmín ^{C}
Staff	~~Abigail~~	Marian	Marian	Yasmín	Yasmín		Charlotte	Fernando ^{C}				Fernando
Staff	Charlotte	~~Charlotte~~					Enzo					Damián
Staff							Delfina					Sebastián

== Nominations table ==
- **Bold** - Indicates that the vote corresponds to "Face to Face"
- Italic - Indicates that the vote corresponds to "All against all"
- Green - Indicates that the vote is positive to save
- Red - Indicates that the vote is negative to eliminate.

	Nominations												
	1	2	3	4	5	6	7 - Rechage	8	9	10	11	Semifinals	Finale
Damián	Not in Hotel						Mimí; Magali; Enzo; Yasmín	**Federico**; Martín	Flori	**Emiliano**; Enzo	**Sebastián**; Enzo	**Emiliano**; Sebastián	Sebastián
Delfina	**Mimí**; Fernando	**Fernando**; Rocío	**Marian**; Flor	**Emiliano**; Federico	Federico	**Verde**; Verde	– Magali – –	**Axel**; Fernando	**Sebastián**; Fernando	**Emiliano**; Fernando	Fernando	**Enzo**; Fernando	Fernando
Fernando	Érica	**Delfina**; Emiliano	Juanma	Sebastián	**Mimí**; Emiliano	**Verde**; Verde; Mimí	– Magali; Enzo; Axel	**Federico**; Martín	Flori	**Emiliano**; Damián	Enzo	**Emiliano**; Sebastián	Sebastián
Martín	**Mimí**; Fernando	Fernando	**Marian**; Flori	Alejo	Fernando	**Verde**; Verde	– Magali; Enzo –	Fernando	**Rocío**; Fernando	Fernando	Fernando	**Enzo**; Fernando	Fernando
Sebastián	Fernando	Fernando	**Marian**; Flori	**Yasmín**; Alejo	Fernando	**Negro**; Amarillo; Enzo	– Alejo; Enzo –	Fernando	**Rocío**; Fernando	Fernando	**Damián**; Fernando	**Enzo**; Damián	Fernando
Yasmín	Not in Hotel			**Mimí**; Martín	**Fernando**; Mimí	Federico -1 vote	Mimí; Alejo; Enzo; Axel	Fernando -1 vote	Flori	**Emiliano**; Axel	**Sebastián**; Enzo	**Emiliano**; Sebastián	Sebastián +1 vote
Emiliano	**Mimí**; Fernando	**Fernando**; Rocío	**Martín**; Flori	**Federico**; Alejo	**Fernando**; Fernando	**Verde**; Verde; Enzo	– Magali; Enzo –	Fernando	Fernando	**Damián**; Fernando	**Damián**; Fernando	**Enzo**; Fernando	Fernando +1 vote
Enzo	**Mimí**; Marian	**Mimí**; Rocío	**Sebastián**; Fernando	**Yasmín**; Martín	Fernando	**Verde**; Amarillo	– Alejo – –	Fernando	**Rocío**; Fernando	Fernando	Fernando	**Martín**; Fernando	Fernando +1 vote
Axel	Not in Hotel						Mimí; Alejo; Enzo; Yasmín	**Federico**; Martín	**Martín**; Flori	Fernando	**Sebastián**; Yasmín	**Emiliano** –	
Flor	Érica	**Delfina**; Fernando	Delfina	Alejo	**Fernando**; Martín	**Negro**; Amarillo –	– Alejo; Delfina –	**Axel**; Martín	Flori	Fernando	Yasmín	Sebastián +1 vote	
Rocío	Érica	Emiliano	Mimí -1 vote				Mimí; Magali; Delfina; Damián	**Federico**; Martín	**Martín**; Flori	**Emiliano**; Enzo			
Flori	Not in Hotel		Fernando	Emiliano	Federico	**Negro**; Amarillo; Enzo	– Alejo; Enzo –	Martín	Delfina				
Charlotte	**Delfina**; Érica	**Juanma**					Yasmín; Magali; Delfina; Yasmín	Martín	—				
Federico	**Mimí**; Fernando	Fernando	Delfina	**Yasmín**; Mimí	**Fernando**; Fernando	**Negro**; Amarillo; Enzo	– Alejo; Enzo –	**Axel**; Fernando	Fernando +1 vote				
Magali	Not in Hotel						Yasmín – Delfina –						
Mimí	**Delfina**; Érica	**Emiliano**; Alejo	**Marian**; Flori	**Yasmín**; Yasmín	**Yasmín**; Emiliano	**Verde**; Amarillo	Yasmín	Fernando -1 vote					
Mimí	**Delfina**; Érica	Fernando -1 vote	**Marian**; Flori	**Yasmín**; Yasmín	**Yasmín**; Emiliano	**Verde**; Amarillo	Yasmín	Fernando -1 vote					
Juanma	Érica	**Fernando**; Rocío	Flori	Alejo	**Fernando**								
Alejo	Érica	Emiliano	Flori	Emiliano	Fernando -1 vote		Yasmín –						
Marian	Érica	Juanma	**Mimí**; Flori	Fernando -1 vote									
Érica	Fernando	—											
Abigail	**Delfina**												
Labyrinth Nominees
Face to Face	Mimí; 5/8 votes	Fernando; 3/8 votes	Marian; 4/7 votes	Yasmín; 4/7 votes	Fernando; 5/7 votes	Sebastián & Flor; 3/5 votes	Yasmín; 4/8 votes	Federico; 4/7 votes	Rocío; 3/6 votes	Emiliano; 5/6 votes	Sebastián; 3/5 votes	Emiliano; 4/9 votes	Damián; Loser challengue Fernando; 5/8 votes
Loser Staff Challenge	Charlotte	Enzo	Sebastián	Federico	Yasmín	Enzo & Mimí	Magali; 7/14 votes	Rocío	Enzo	Rocío; Damián	Yasmín	~~Axel~~; Enzo	Damián; Loser challengue Fernando; 5/8 votes
Loser Huesped Challenge	Alejo	Marian	Alejo	Juanma	Enzo	Federico & Flori	Enzo; 9/13 votes	Flori	Damián	Axel	Flor	Damián	Damián; Loser challengue Fernando; 5/8 votes
Other												Sebastián by VIP Huesped	
Duelists in the H Duel
Loser Labyrinth	Mimí	Enzo	Marian	Juanma	Yasmín	Enzo & Mimí	Enzo	Federico	Rocío	Rocío	Flor	Enzo; Emiliano	
All against all	Érica; 8/15 votes	Rocío; 4/14 votes	Flori; 7/14 votes	Alejo; 5/14 votes	Fernando; 4/12 votes	Delfina & Martín; 3/5 votes	Yasmín; 3/6 votes	Martín; 7/15 votes	Fernando; 6/13 votes	Fernando; 7/11 votes	Fernando; 5/10 votes	Fernando; 5/9 votes Sebastián; 4/9 votes	
Saved						Enzo; 4/5 votes							
Eliminated	**Abigail**; Abandoned	**Charlotte**; Abandoned	**Marian**; Lost duel in H	**Alejo**; Lost duel in H	**Juanma**; Expelled	**Mimí**; 1/5 votes	**Mimí** by Damián due to draw	**Federico**; Lost duel in H	**Charlotte**; Abandoned	**Fernando**; Lost duel in H	**Flor**; Lost duel in H	**Axel**; Evacued	**Yasmín**; Lost challengue
Eliminated	**Mimí**; Lost duel in H	**Erica**; Evacued	**Marian**; Lost duel in H	**Alejo**; Lost duel in H	**Yasmín**; Lost duel in H	**Mimí**; 1/5 votes	**Alejo** by Damián due to draw	**Federico**; Lost duel in H	**Rocío**; Lost duel in H	**Rocío**; Abandoned	**Flor**; Lost duel in H	**Enzo**; Lost duel in H	**Fernando**; Lost challengue
Eliminated	**Mimí**; Lost duel in H	**Rocío**; Lost duel in H	**Marian**; Lost duel in H	**Alejo**; Lost duel in H	**Yasmín**; Lost duel in H	**Mimí**; 1/5 votes	**Magali** for losing the Labyrinth	**Federico**; Lost duel in H	**Flori**; Abandoned	**Rocío**; Abandoned	**Flor**; Lost duel in H	**Emiliano**; Lost duel in H	**Damián**; Sebastián and Martín decision
Eliminated	**Mimí**; Lost duel in H	**Rocío**; Lost duel in H	**Marian**; Lost duel in H	**Alejo**; Lost duel in H	**Yasmín**; Lost duel in H	**Mimí**; 1/5 votes	**Yasmín**; Lost duel in H	**Federico**; Lost duel in H	**Flori**; Abandoned	**Rocío**; Abandoned	**Flor**; Lost duel in H	**Emiliano**; Lost duel in H	**Delfina**; Lost the Labyrinth
Notes		(Note: After Abigail's abandonment, Martín, the captain of the host team, decided that Mimí would re-enter the competition given the possibility that a new participant would enter the game.)				(Note: During this week, the competition format was carried out in doubles, that is, the fate of your partner is tied to that of another partner at all times (nominations and votes). As for the elimination, the pair that was the loser of the duel in the H must face the vote of their teammates so that only one of the two continues in play. |) (Note: After Mimí & Enzo were the losing duo, the save vote was made. Flor did not cast her vote since the elimination is already resolved, while Martín and Delfina did not vote because they are duelists.)	(Note: This week the repechage was carried out, in each instance (exception of the Guest challenge) the worst of the tests would face a vote by their peers, the one with the most votes would be eliminated and the other would be nominated for the labyrinth. Mimí was eliminated against Yasmín by Damián's decision due to a 4-4 draw; Alejo was eliminated against Magali due to Damián's decision due to a 7-7 draw.)						

== Summary statistics ==
	Eliminations																			
	1	2	3	4	5	6	7 (Repechage)				8	9	10	11	12	13 (Final)				
Sebastián	Saved	Immune	Nominated	Saved	Immune	Nominated	Inactive		Saved	Inactive	Immune	Saved	Immune	Nominated	Duelist	Win	Saved	Win	Nom	Winner
Martín	Saved	Saved	Saved	Saved	Saved	Duelist	Inactive		Saved	Inactive	Duelist	Saved	Saved	Immune	Saved	Saved	Saved	Win	Nom	Runner-up
Delfina	Saved	Saved	Saved	Saved	Saved	Duelist	Inactive		Salved	Inactive	Saved	Saved	Saved	Saved	Saved	Saved	Saved	Nom	3th	
Damián	Not in Hotel						Win	Win	Inactive	Saved	Saved	Nominated	Nominated	Saved	Nominated	Nom	Nom	4th		
Fernando	Saved	Nominated	Saved	Immune	Duelist	Immune	Inactive		Immune	Inactive	Saved	Duelist	Eliminated	Duelist	Duelist	Win	5th			
Yasmín	Not in Hotel			Nominated	Eliminated		Nom	Inac	Nom	Elim		Saved	Saved	Nominated	Saved	6th				
Emiliano	Saved	Saved	Saved	Saved	Saved	Immune	Inactive		Saved	Inactive	Saved	Immune	Nominated	Saved	Eliminated					
Enzo	Saved	Duelist	Saved	Saved	Nominated	Duelist	Inactive		Nom	Duelist	Saved	Nominated	Saved	Saved	Eliminated					
Axel	Not in Hotel						Saved	Saved	Inactive	Saved	Saved	Saved	Nominated	Saved	Evacuated					
Flor	Saved	Saved	Saved	Saved	Saved	Nominated	Inactive		Saved	Inactive	Saved	Saved	Saved	Eliminated						
Rocío	Saved	Eliminated					Win	Saved	Inactive	Saved	Nominated	Eliminated	Abandoned							
Flori	Not in Hotel		Duelist	Saved	Saved	Nominated	Inactive		Saved	Inactive	Nominated	Abandoned								
Charlotte	Nominated	Abandoned					Win	Saved	Inactive	Saved	Saved	Abandoned								
Federico	Saved	Saved	Immune	Nominated	Saved	Nominated	Inactive		Saved	Inactive	Eliminated									
Magali	Not in Hotel						Saved	Nom	Elim											
Alejo	Nominated	Saved	Nominated	Eliminated			Win	Elim												
Mimí	Eliminated	Saved	Saved	Saved	Saved	Eliminated	Elim													
Juanma	Immune	Saved	Saved	Duelist	Expelled															
Marian	Saved	Nominated	Eliminated																	
Erica	Duelist	Evacuated																		
Abigail	Abandoned																			

== Visits ==
- Alex Caniggia (winner of El Hotel De Los Famosos 1)
- Fer Vázquez
- Marcela Tinayre
- Iliana Calabro
- Pachu Peña
- Anamá Ferreyra
- El Polaco
- Matilda Blanco (from El Hotel De Los Famosos (season 1)

Huésped VIP

- Mónica Farro (from El Hotel De Los Famosos (season 1)
- Lissa Vera (from El Hotel De Los Famosos (season 1)
- Kate Rodríguez (from El Hotel De Los Famosos (season 1)
- Walter Queijeiro (from El Hotel De Los Famosos (season 1)
