= Charlotte Caniggia =

Argentine model

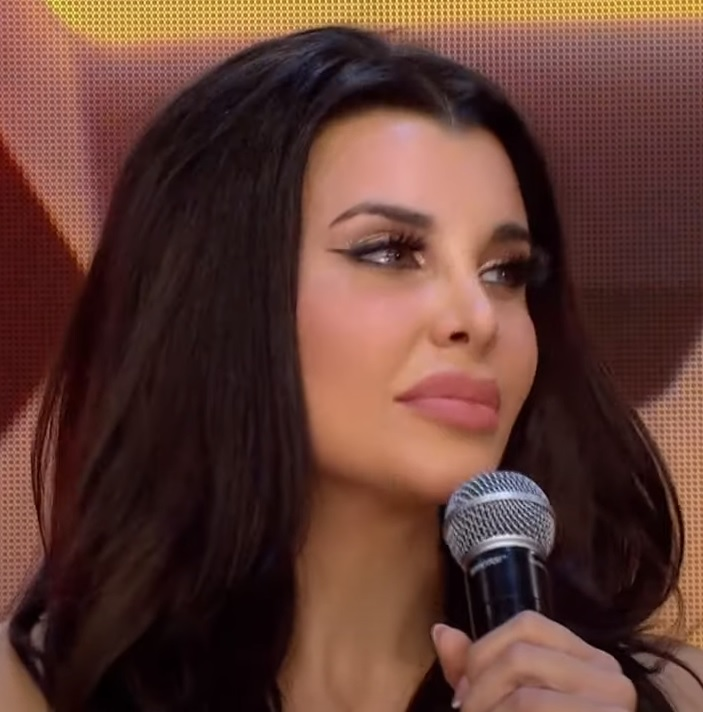
- Caniggia in 2021
- Born: Charlotte Chantal Solange Caniggia Nannis; 15 February 1993 (age 33); Buenos Aires, Argentina
- Occupations: Model, social media influencer, showgirl and media personality
- Years active: 2010–present
- Parent: Claudio Caniggia (father)
- Relatives: Alex Caniggia (brother)

Charlotte Chantal Solange Caniggia Nannis (born 15 February 1993) is an Argentine model, social media influencer, showgirl and media personality. She is the daughter of retired professional footballer Claudio Caniggia and retired model Mariana Nannis; her twin brother is Alexander Caniggia, also a media personality.

== Biography ==
Caniggia began her television career in 2010, when she appeared with her mother Mariana Nannis, in Mujeres ricas, which aired on La Sexta in Spain. In 2012, she participated in the eight season of the Marcelo Tinelli's Bailando por un Sueño in Argentina. in 2015, she took part, along with Cecilia Rodriguez, Fanny Neguesha, Cristina Buccino, Alex Belli and other contestants, in the tenth season of the Italian reality show L'isola dei famosi (Celebrity Survivor Italy) hosted by Alessia Marcuzzi with Alvin on Canale 5. In early 2016, Caniggia took part in the fourth season of the Spanish reality show Gran Hermano VIP aired on Telecinco. Later that same year, she returned as a contestant in the Marcelo Tinelli's dance program Bailando 2016, aired on El Trece.

From 18 September 2017 to 29 July 2019, she co-hosted the MTV Latinoamérica docu-reality programme MTV Caniggia Libre with her twin brother Alexander Caniggia, also a media personality. In 2019, the siblings appeared in the Chilean reality show Resistiré, and later that year, she competed alone in the Argentinian reality show Showmatch: Super Bailando 2019, also hosted by Tinelli. In early 2020, Caniggia participated in Divina comida aired on Telefe; and later competed in the Argentinian reality show Cantando 2020 aired on El Trece. in early 2021, she took part in Acapulco Shore: The family back in Acapulco, a Mexican television programme aired on MTV Latinoamérica. Later that year, she participated in the Marcello Tinelli's dance program Showmatch: La Academia on El Trece and at the end of the year, she competed in the third season of MasterChef Celebrity on Telefe. She participated in Bailando 2023, the fifteenth edition of Bailando por un Sueño, again hosted by Marcelo Tinelli.

== Filmography ==
=== Television ===
Year	Title	Role	Notes
2012, 2016, 2019, 2023–2024	Bailando por un Sueño	Herself	12th eliminated (season 8); 18th eliminated (season 11); 17th eliminated (season 14); withdrew (season 15)
2015	L'isola dei famosi	Herself	2nd eliminated (season 10)
2016	Gran Hermano VIP	Herself	8th evicted (season 4)
2017–2019	MTV Caniggia libre	Herself	Co-lead role
2019	Resistiré	Herself	Withdrew
2020	Divina comida	Herself	3rd place
2020	Cantando por un sueño	Herself	19th eliminated (season 5)
2021	Acapulco Shore	Herself	Main cast (season 8)
2021	La Academia	Herself	3rd eliminated
2021–2022	MasterChef Celebrity Argentina	Herself	8th eliminated (season 3)
2022, 2023	El hotel de los famosos	Herself	Guest (season 1); withdrew (season 2)
2022	¿Quién es la máscara?	Luna, alien woman	10th unmasked
2023–2024	En busca del Nirvana	Herself	4th place
2026	Gran Hermano	Herself	3rd place (season 13)

=== Cinema ===
Year	Title	Role	Notes
2018	Bañeros 5: Lentos y cargosos	Agustina	

== Awards and nominations ==
Year	Prize	Category	Nominated work	Outcome	Ref.
2013	Premios Los Más Clickeados 2013	Famosos con más rating en internet (Celebrities with the highest rating on the internet)	Herself	Won	
2016	Premios Los Más Clickeados 2016	Famosos con más rating en internet (Celebrities with the highest rating on the internet)	Herself	Won	
2017	MTV Millennial Awards 2017	Instagrammer nivel Dios - Argentina (Instagrammer level God - Argentina)	Herself	Nominated	
2018	MTV Millennial Awards 2018	Instagrammer nivel Dios - Argentina (Instagrammer level God - Argentina)	Herself	Nominated	
2019	MTV Millennial Awards 2019	Instagrammer nivel Dios - Argentina (Instagrammer level God - Argentina)	Herself	Nominated	
