= El hotel de los famosos =

Argentine reality show

- Also known as: The Hotel of the Famous
- Genre: Reality show
- Presented by: Finery; Carolina Ardohain (2022-present); Leandro Leunis(2022-present); Debate; Rodrigo Lussich (2022); Adrián Pallares (2022); Digital host Candela Ruggeri (2022); Locho Loccisano (2023-present)
- Country of origin: Argentina
- Original language: Spanish
- No. of seasons: 2 (2023)
- No. of episodes: (list of episodes)

Production
- Production locations: Cañuelas, Argentina
- Production company: BxFsh (BoxFish TV)

Original release
- Network: eltrece
- Release: 21 March 2022

El hotel de los famosos (in English: The Hotel of the Famous) is a reality show on eltrece, in which celebrities undergo a four-month confinement in a hotel without access to the outside. The Argentine program was scheduled to premiere on February 28, 2022, but it was postponed to March 21 of the same year. The entrance of the participants to the contest was on February 28, 2022, the day the recordings of the program began.

The show is presented by Carolina Ardohain and Leandro Leunis, and featured the participation of 16 celebrities who were revealed prior to its premiere on screen.

== Team ==
Host
Host of the Debate
Digital host
Managers of hotel, kitchen, garden, emotional.
Panelist of the Debate
P Participant

	Season	
	1 (2022)	2 (2023)
Current
Pampita	H	
Leandro Leunis	H	
Gabriel Oliveri	M	
José María Muscari	E	
José María Muscari	D	
Juan Miceli	G	
Christian Petersen	K	
Locho Loccisano	P	H
Formerly
Dalia Gutmann	D	
Candela Ruggeri	H	
Rodrigo Lussich	D	
Adrián Pallares	D	
Tomás Balmaceda	D	
Romina Scalora	D	

== Format ==
Sixteen participants will remain isolated from the outside in a hotel, specially designed for a reality show, with all the comforts. There are four months of coexistence and competition, a weekly elimination and a single winner who will take 10 million Argentine pesos.

A group of celebrities travels to a dream vacation, in a hotel on the outskirts of the city, with all the luxury and comfort. There is only one detail: The hotel does not have employees.

At the beginning of each week, teams are drawn up to face each other in a challenge that will define who are guests (those who enjoy themselves) and who are hotel staff (those who work so that others enjoy).

Guests stay in upgraded rooms, and have access to the pool, spa, and bar. They will have buffet breakfast and other meals. They can enjoy games, sports, recreational activities, themed parties, live shows and gourmet dinners by guest chefs. Every week, two participants have the opportunity to become VIP guests and access the master suite, the most exclusive room in the entire complex.

The staff stay in the Service Area (the least comfortable space in the hotel). They are in charge of maintenance and guest service tasks: washing linen, preparing breakfast and other meals, taking care of green spaces and the swimming pool, repair and general maintenance of the facilities.

Every day, a different challenge changes the course of coexistence. Dexterity, ability, intelligence and endurance will be put to the test. The winners will access benefits for the stay. The losers will be nominated. In addition, all the inhabitants face the "All against All", the nomination event that will put a participant closer to the nomination. At the end of the week, an elimination duel defines who leaves the hotel.

The game area is made up of four sections: the Team Challenge set, the Individual Challenge set, the Labyrinth and the Elimination Duel in the H.

== Series overview ==
Series N°	Location	First aired	Last aired	Episodes	Winner	Runner-up	Finalist	Prize	Viewers
El hotel de los famosos 1	Cañuelas, Argentina	21 March 2022	25 July 2022	89	Alex Caniggia	Martín Salwe	Walter Queijeiro; Lissa Vera	$10,000,000 (ARS)	10.5
El hotel de los famosos 2	Cañuelas, Argentina	9 January 2023	10 April 2023	65	Sebastián Cobelli	Martín Coggi	Delfina Gérez Bosco; Damian Ávila; Fernando Carrillo; Yasmín Corti	$15,000,000 (ARS)	TBA

== International versions ==
Country/Region	Official name	Network	Winner	Presenter(s)	Ref.
Mexico	Hotel VIP	Canal 5	TBD	Roberto Palazuelos; Karina Banda	
