= El hotel de los famosos season 1 =

El hotel de los famosos
- Season 1
- Presented by: Galas; Carolina Ardohain; Leandro Leunis; Debate; Rodrigo Lussich; Adrián Pallares; Digital host Candela Ruggeri
- No. of episodes: 89

Release
- Original network: El Trece
- Original release: 21 March – 25 July 2022

Season chronology
- Next → El Hotel De Los Famosos (season 2)

The first season of El hotel de los famosos (in English: The Hotel Of The Famous 1) was a reality show on El Trece, in which celebrities undergo a four-month confinement in a hotel without access to the outside. The Argentine program was scheduled to premiere on February 28, 2022, but it was postponed to March 21 of the same year.

== Hosts and managers ==
- Hosts
  - Pampita and Leandro Leunis present the galas where the challenges that the participants must face and the eliminations, among other things, will be known.
  - Rodrigo Lussich and Adrián Pallares are in charge of the weekly debate together with a team of panelists made up of Dalia Gutmann, José María Muscari, Romina Scalora and Tomás Balmaceda.
  - Candela Ruggeri is the digital host in charge of the program's social networks.
- Managers
  - Gabriel Oliveri, hotel manager
  - José María Muscari, emotional coach
  - Juan Miceli, in charge of the gardens
  - Christian Petersen, kitchen manager

== Format ==
Sixteen participants will remain isolated from the outside in a hotel, specially designed for a reality show, with all the comforts. There are four months of coexistence and competition, a weekly elimination and a single winner who will take 10 million Argentine pesos.

A group of celebrities travels to a dream vacation, in a hotel on the outskirts of the city, with all the luxury and comfort. There is only one detail: The hotel does not have employees.

At the beginning of each week, teams are drawn up to face each other in a challenge that will define who are guests (those who enjoy themselves) and who are hotel staff (those who work so that others enjoy).

Guests stay in upgraded rooms, and have access to the pool, spa, and bar. They will have buffet breakfast and other meals. They can enjoy games, sports, recreational activities, themed parties, live shows and gourmet dinners by guest chefs. Every week, two participants have the opportunity to become VIP guests and access the master suite, the most exclusive room in the entire complex.

The staff stay in the Service Area (the least comfortable space in the hotel). They are in charge of maintenance and guest service tasks: washing linen, preparing breakfast and other meals, taking care of green spaces and the swimming pool, repair and general maintenance of the facilities.

Every day, a different challenge changes the course of coexistence. Dexterity, ability, intelligence and endurance will be put to the test. The winners will access benefits for the stay. The losers will be nominated. In addition, all the inhabitants face the "All against All", the nomination event that will put a participant closer to the nomination. At the end of the week, an elimination duel defines who leaves the hotel.

The game area is made up of four sections: the Team Challenge set, the Individual Challenge set, the Labyrinth and the Elimination Duel in the H.

== Participants ==
=== Participants ===
On January 25, 2021, the official list of contestants was confirmed.

Name	Occupation/Original series	Episode entered	Episode exited	Status	Duels in H
Álex Caniggia	Bailando 2012	1	89	Winner	0
Martín Salwe	Announcer	1	89	Runner-up	1
Walter Queijeiro	Sports journalist	66	87	3rd place	1
Walter Queijeiro	Sports journalist	1	35	7th eliminated	2
Lissa Vera	Popstar	54	87	4th place	2
Lissa Vera	Popstar	1	45	9th eliminated	2
Locho Loccisano	Combate	21	85	16th eliminated	4
Majo Martíno	Journalist and panelist	79	80	15th eliminated	1
Majo Martíno	Journalist and panelist	1	40	8th eliminated	2
Melody Luz	Bailando 2021	1	79	Evacuated	1
Imanol Rodríguez	Miguel Ángel Rodríguez's son	1	75	14th eliminated	3
Emily Lucius	Belu Lucius' sister	31	70	13th eliminated	1
Maximiliano Estévez, Chanchi	Former footballer	1	66	Abandoned	0
Sabrina Carballo	Actress	1	66	12th eliminated	2
Claudio García, Turco	MasterChef Celebrity Argentina	46	60	11th eliminated	1
Militta Bora	Bailando 2016	46	55	10th eliminated	1
Militta Bora	Bailando 2016	1	5	1st eliminated	1
Mónica Farro	Bailando por un Sueño 2008	46	54	Evacuated	1
Silvina Luna	Gran Hermano	14	30	6th eliminated	1
Silvina Luna	Gran Hermano	1	9	Evacuated	0
Pato Galván	TV host and journalist	1	25	5th eliminated	1
Rodrigo Noya	Bailando 2019	1	21	Abandoned	1
Matilda Blanco	Corte y confección	1	20	4th eliminated	2
Nicolás Maiques	Actor	8	15	3rd eliminated	1
Kate Rodríguez	El gran premio de la cocina	1	10	2nd eliminated	2
Leo García	Singer	1	6	Abandoned	0

=== Weekly accommodations ===
- Bold: VIP Guest
- Italic: Worst staff (weeks 1-9, 13) / Best staff (weeks 10-12,14)
- →← Participants who exchange locations by winning or losing the Guest and Staff challenges

	Guest	Staff
Week 1	Chanchi, Lissa, Martín, Matilda, Melody, **Rodrigo**, Sabrina; Leo →	Imanol, Kate, Majo, Pato, Silvina, Walter, Militta ← Álex
Week 2	Kate, Martín, **Melody**, Sabrina, Silvina, Walter; Pato →	Álex, Chanchi, Imanol, ~~Leo~~, Lissa, Majo, Matilda, Nicolás ← Rodrigo
Week 3	Pato, Chanchi, Álex, Sabrina, **Imanol**, Silvina; Majo →	Lissa, Rodrigo, Melody, Nicolás, Matilda, Walter ← Martín
Week 4	Chanchi, Álex, Martín, **Melody**, Lissa; Matilda →	Walter, Rodrigo, Imanol, Sabrina, Pato, Silvina ← Majo
Week 5	Chanchi, Álex, Lissa, Imanol, **Silvina**; Majo →	Locho, Martín, Melody, Sabrina, Pato ← Walter
Week 6	**Melody**, Sabrina, Lissa, Imanol; Chanchi →	Locho, Martín, Walter, Silvina, Majo ← Álex
Week 7	Emily, Walter, Chanchi, **Melody**; Álex →	Majo, Locho, Sabrina, Lissa, Imanol ← Martín
Week 8	Melody, **Álex**, Locho; Lissa →	Chanchi, Sabrina, Emily, Majo, Imanol ← Martín
Week 9	**Álex**, Martín, Emily; Sabrina →	Lissa, Chanchi, Locho, Imanol ← Melody
Week 10	Álex, Martín, Melody, Chanchi, Imanol, Locho	
Week 10	Sabrina	Militta, Majo, Walter, **Lissa**
Week 10	Emily	Matilda, Turco, Silvina, Pato, Mónica
Week 11	**Turco**, Martín, Sabrina, ~~Mónica~~, Lissa; Melody →	Chanchi, Álex, Militta, Emily, Locho ← Imanol
Week 12	Chanchi, Sabrina, Locho, **Melody**, Turco; Emily →	Imanol, Lissa, Martín ← Álex
Week 13	**Martín**, Melody, Emily; Chanchi →	Álex, Lissa, Locho, Sabrina ← Imanol (Loaned by Lissa)
Week 14	Álex, **Locho**, Lissa; Melody →	Imanol, Emily, Walter ← Martín
Week 15	Martín, Walter, Melody, Imanol	
Week 15	**Álex**, Lissa, Locho	
Week 16	**Martín**, ~~Melody~~, Majo, Álex	
Week 16	Walter, Lissa, Locho	
Week 17	**Martín**, Lissa	
Week 17	Álex, Locho, Walter	
Week 18	**Martín**, Lissa	
Week 18	Álex, Walter	

=== Nominations table ===
- **Bold** - Indicates that the vote corresponds to "Face to Face"
- Italic - Indicates that the vote corresponds to "All against all"
- * - The vote corresponds to the captain of the Huesped team due to a tie

This contestant was inmune
Positive vote

	Week 1	Week 2	Week 3	Week 4	Week 5	Week 6	Week 7	Week 8	Week 9	Week 10	Week 11	Week 12	Week 13	Week 14	Week 15	Week 16	Week 17
Álex	**Pato**; Kate	**Imanol**; Rodrigo	Rodrigo	Sabrina	Walter	**Locho**; Majo	Walter	Locho	Lissa; Lissa *	Militta	**Locho**; Locho	**Martín**; Martín	**Sabrina**; Emily	Emily	**Lissa**	**Locho**	**Martín**
Álex	**Pato**; Kate	**Imanol**; Rodrigo	Rodrigo	Sabrina	Walter	**Locho**; Majo	Walter	Locho	Lissa; Lissa *	Militta	**Locho**; Locho	**Martín**; Martín	**Sabrina**; Emily	Emily	Martín	Majo	Locho
Martín	Kate	Kate	**Lissa**; Rodrigo	Sabrina	**Melody**; Lissa	**Majo**; Majo	**Locho**; Majo	**Majo**; Locho	Álex	Militta	Locho	**Lissa**; Turco	Lissa	**Imanol**; Álex	**Locho**	**Locho**	**Lissa**
Martín	Kate	Kate	**Lissa**; Rodrigo	Sabrina	**Melody**; Lissa	**Majo**; Majo	**Locho**; Majo	**Majo**; Locho	Álex	Militta	Locho	**Lissa**; Turco	Lissa	**Imanol**; Álex	Walter	Majo	Locho
Walter	**Militta**; Matilda	Majo	**Nicolás**; Imanol	**Majo**; Martín	**Melody**; Majo	**Locho**; Imanol	Imanol	Eliminated						**Emily**; Emily	**Locho**	**Lissa**	**Lissa**
Walter	**Militta**; Matilda	Majo	**Nicolás**; Imanol	**Majo**; Martín	**Melody**; Majo	**Locho**; Imanol	Imanol	Eliminated						**Emily**; Emily	Martín	Majo	Martín
Lissa	Kate	**Leo**; Walter	**Martín**; Rodrigo	Sabrina	Martín	Majo	**Locho**; Walter	Locho	**Locho**; Locho	Eliminated	Emily	**Martín**; Chanchi	**Sabrina**; Emily	Emily	**Locho**	**Walter**	**Martín**
Lissa	Kate	**Leo**; Walter	**Martín**; Rodrigo	Sabrina	Martín	Majo	**Locho**; Walter	Locho	**Locho**; Locho	Eliminated	Emily	**Martín**; Chanchi	**Sabrina**; Emily	Emily	Martín	Majo	Locho
Locho	Not in Hotel				**Sabrina**; Melody	**Martín**; Martín	**Lissa**; Imanol	Sabrina	**Melody**; Lissa	Walter	**Militta**; Emily	Martín	**Sabrina**; Emily	Emily	**Álex**	**Walter**	**Lissa**
Locho	Not in Hotel				**Sabrina**; Melody	**Martín**; Martín	**Lissa**; Imanol	Sabrina	**Melody**; Lissa	Walter	**Militta**; Emily	Martín	**Sabrina**; Emily	Emily	Martín	Martín	Martín
Majo	**Pato**; Matilda	**Imanol**; Kate	Rodrigo	**Rodrigo**; Sabrina	Walter	**Martín**; Sabrina	**Martín**; Martín	**Martín**; Sabrina	Eliminated							Martín	Eliminated
Melody	Kate	Pato	**Nicolás**; Matilda	Martín	**Walter**; Álex	Majo	Walter	Locho	**Locho**; Locho	Militta	Locho	Lissa	Chanchi	Emily	**Álex**	**Locho**	Evacuated
Melody	Kate	Pato	**Nicolás**; Matilda	Martín	**Walter**; Álex	Majo	Walter	Locho	**Locho**; Locho	Militta	Locho	Lissa	Chanchi	Emily	Walter	-	Evacuated
Imanol	**Militta**; Matilda	**Álex**; Álex	Rodrigo	**Silvina**; Melody	Walter	Locho	**Locho**; Walter	**Majo**; Martín	**Chanchi**; Chanchi	Turco	**Locho**; Locho	**Martín**; Turco	**Álex**; Lissa	**Walter**; Álex	**Lissa**	Eliminated	
Imanol	**Militta**; Matilda	**Álex**; Álex	Rodrigo	**Silvina**; Melody	Walter	Locho	**Locho**; Walter	**Majo**; Martín	**Chanchi**; Chanchi	Turco	**Locho**; Locho	**Martín**; Turco	**Álex**; Lissa	**Walter**; Álex	Walter	Eliminated	
Emily	Not in Hotel						Walter	**Majo**; Locho	Lissa	Militta	**Locho**; Locho	Turco	Lissa	**Imanol**; Álex	Eliminated		
Chanchi	Kate	**Leo**; Kate	Rodrigo	**Rodrigo***; Melody	Walter	Majo	Melody	**Majo**; Locho	**Lissa**; Locho	Lissa	**Locho**; Locho	Turco	Lissa	Abandoned			
Sabrina	Kate	Pato	Rodrigo	**Majo**; Álex	**Martín**; Martín	Majo	**Locho**; Imanol	**Majo**; Locho	Emily	**Militta**; Militta	Locho	Turco	**Álex**; Lissa	Eliminated			
Turco	Not in Hotel										Martín	Martín	Eliminated				
Militta	**Kate**; Matilda	Eliminated									**Locho**; Sabrina	Eliminated					
Mónica	Not in Hotel										–	Evacuated					
Silvina	**Kate**; Matilda	Evacuated	Chanchi	**Rodrigo**; Imanol	Walter	**Locho**; Sabrina	Eliminated										
Pato	**Álex**; Matilda	Walter	Matilda	**Rodrigo**; Álex	**Melody**; Chanchi	Eliminated											
Rodrigo	Kate; Kate *	**Leo**; Álex	**Nicolás**; Imanol	**Majo**; Lissa	Abandoned												
Matilda	Kate	**Leo**; Kate	**Rodrigo**; Melody	Sabrina	Eliminated												
Nicolás	Not in Hotel	Kate	**Melody**; Rodrigo	Eliminated													
Kate	**Militta**; Matilda	Majo	Eliminated														
Leo	Matilda	**Rodrigo** -	Abandoned														
Nominateds										Candidates	Nominateds				Immunes		
Face to Face	Militta; 3/8 votes	~~Leo~~; ~~4/8 votes~~ Imanol; 2/8 votes	Nicolás; 3/7 votes	Rodrigo; 4/8 votes	Melody; 3/6 votes	Locho; 3/6 votes	Locho; 4/6 votes	Majo; 5/6 votes	Locho; 2/5 votes	Militta; Sabrina's; Choice	Locho; 5/6 votes	Martín; 3/4 votes	Sabrina; 3/5 votes	Imanol; 2/4 votes	Locho; 3/7 votes	Locho; 3/6 votes	Lissa; 3/5 votes
Staff Challenge	Silvina	Matilda	Matilda	~~Pato~~	Sabrina	Silvina	Sabrina	Sabrina	Imanol	Mónica	Militta	Imanol	Imanol	Walter	Álex	Martín	Álex
Huesped Challenge	Leo	Pato	Majo	Matilda	Majo	Chanchi	Álex	Lissa	Sabrina	Lissa	Melody	Emily	Chanchi	Melody	Martín	Melody	Martín
Sanction			Melody		Pato												
Duelist
Labyrinth	Militta	Matilda	Nicolás	Matilda	Pato	Silvina	Locho	Majo	Imanol	Mónica; Lissa	Militta	Imanol	Sabrina	Melody	Imanol	Lissa	Walter
All against all	Kate; 9/16 votes	Kate; 5/14 votes	Rodrigo; 8/14 votes	Sabrina; 5/13 votes	Walter; 5/12 votes	Majo; 6/11 votes	Walter; 5/11 votes	Locho; 7/10 votes	Lissa; 4/10 votes		Locho; 7/11 votes	Turco; 5/10 votes	Lissa; 5/9 votes	Emily; 5/8 votes	Martín; 4/7 votes	Majo; 4/6 votes	Locho; 3/5 votes
Eliminated	**Militta**; Lost duel	**Kate**; Lost duel	**Nicolás**; Lost duel	**Matilda**; Lost duel	**Pato**; Lost duel	**Silvina**; Lost duel	**Walter**; Lost duel	**Majo**; Lost duel	**Lissa**; Lost duel	Lissa; Majo; Walter; Silvina; Pato; Matilda	**Militta**; Lost duel	**Turco**; Lost duel	**Sabrina**; Lost duel	**Emily**; Lost duel	**Imanol**; Lost duel	**Majo**; Lost duel	**Locho**; Lost duel
Repechage										Militta by 5/8 votes Mónica by win duel Turco chosen by managers							

=== Summary statistics ===
- Bold text: nominees who transformed into dualists and competed in the elimination pot.

	Week 1	Week 2	Week 3	Week 4		Week 5	Week 6	Week 7	Week 8	Week 9	Week 10	Week 11		Week 12	Week 13	Week 14	Week 15	Week 16		Week 17	Final	
Álex	Safe	Safe	Safe	Safe		Safe	Safe	Nominated	Safe	Safe	Immune	Safe		Safe	Safe	Safe	Safe	Nominated		Safe	Nominated	Winner
Martín	Safe	Safe	Safe	Safe		Safe	Safe	Safe	Safe	Safe	Immune	Safe		Nominated	Safe	Safe	**Duelist**	Safe		Safe	Finalist	Runner-up
Walter	Safe	Safe	Safe	Safe		**Duelist**	Safe	Eliminated			Eliminated					Nominated	Nominated	Nominated		**Duelist**	Third	
Lissa	Safe	Safe	Safe	Safe		Safe	Safe	Safe	Nominated	Eliminated	Eliminated	Ret.	Safe	Safe	**Duelist**	Safe	Nominated	**Duelist**		Safe	Fourth	
Locho	Not in Hotel					Immune	Nominated	**Duelist**	**Duelist**	Nominated	Immune	**Duelist**		Safe	Safe	Safe	Safe	Safe		Eliminated		
Majo	Safe	Safe	Nominated	Safe		Nominated	**Duelist**	Safe	Eliminated		Eliminated							Ret.	Elimi.			
Melody	Safe	Safe	Nominated	Safe		Nominated	Safe	Safe	Safe	Safe	Immune	Nominated		Safe	Safe	**Duelist**	Nominated	Evacuated				
Imanol	Safe	Nominated	Safe	Safe		Safe	Safe	Safe	Safe	**Duelist**	Immune	Safe		**Duelist**	Nominated	Nominated	Eliminated					
Emily	Not in Hotel							Immune	Safe	Safe	Immune	Safe		Nominated	Safe	Eliminated						
Chanchi	Safe	Safe	Safe	Safe		Safe	Nominated	Safe	Safe	Safe	Immune	Safe		Safe	Nominated	Abandoned						
Sabrina	Safe	Safe	Safe	**Duelist**		Nominated	Safe	Nominated	Nominated	Nominated	Immune	Safe		Safe	Eliminated							
Turco	Not in Hotel										Entry	Safe		Eliminated								
Militta	Eliminated										Return	Eliminated										
Mónica	Not in Hotel										Entry	Evacuated										
Silvina	Nominated	Evacuated	Safe	Safe		Safe	Eliminated				Eliminated											
Pato	Safe	Nominated	Safe	~~Nom.~~	Imm.	Eliminated					Eliminated											
Rodrigo	Safe	Safe	**Duelist**	Nominated		Abandoned																
Matilda	Safe	**Duelist**	Nominated	Eliminated							Eliminated											
Nicolás	N/H	Immune	Eliminated																			
Kate	**Duelist**	Eliminated																				
Leo	Nominated	Abandoned																				

== Reception and episodes ==
El hotel de los famosos was broadcast on Monday, Tuesday, Wednesday, Thursday and Fridays (the debate is broadcast on Saturday), on eltrece. The show's debut averaged 13.6 ratings points, and with an peak of more than 14 points, by a small difference it did not beat the competition but it did match the rating of Sen Anlat Karadeniz (a Turkish soap opera). By moments, it vastly outperformed the competition, becoming the most third most watched program of the day by points. On the last episode averaged 13.6, with an peak of 17.5, being that the biggest peak of all the show, and outperforming The Voice Argentina. The finale was broadcast before the premiere of All Together Now Argentina, and being the second most viewed program of the day, being only outperformed by the premiere of All Together Now.

=== Episodes of El Hotel De Famosos ===
List of chapters of «El Hotel de los Famosos»
Week	N°	Title in Spanish	Title in English	Day	Date (2022)	Audience (points)	Ref.
1	1	Untitled		Monday: Entrance	March 21	13.6	
1	2	Untitled		Tuesday	March 22	13.2	
1	3	Untitled		Wednesday	March 23	12.0	
1	4	Untitled		Thursday	March 24	11.5	
1	5	Untitled		Saturday: Elimination of Militta	March 26	7.2	
2	6	«Hablás de mí»	«You talk about me»	Monday: Withdrew of Leo	March 28	10.2	
2	7	«Mundos opuestos»	«Opposite worlds»	Tuesday	March 29	9.7	
2	8	«El Elfo aplicado»	«The applied elf»	Wednesday: Entrance of Nicolás	March 30	10.6	
2	9	Untitled		Thursday: Withdrew of Silvina	March 31	9.8	
2	10	«La Pantera y La Tigresa»	«The Panther and The Tigress»	Friday: Elimination of Kate	April 1	9.5	
3	11	«Ajo y Agua»	«Garlic and Water»	Monday	April 4	8.9	
3	12	«Dulces confesiones»	«Sweet confessions»	Tuesday	April 5	7.7	
3	13	«¿Gerenta o Herr Enta?»	«Manager or Man Anger?»	Wednesday	April 6	9.2	
3	14	«Luna llena»	«Full moon»	Thursday: Silvina's re-entry	April 7	8.8	
3	15	«El Ardilla vs El Elfo»	«The Squirrel vs The Elf»	Friday: Elimination of Nicolás	April 8	10.3	
4	16	«Arde el Ardi»	«Squir Burns»	Monday	April 11	8.9	
4	17	«Despedida de solteros»	«Bachelor party»	Tuesday	April 12	10.0	
4	18	«El Casamiento del Año»	«The Wedding of the Year»	Wednesday	April 13	9.7	
4	19	«La Sabricienta»	«Sabrinderella»	Thursday	April 14	8.4	
4	20	«Adiós y buena suerte»	«Bye and good luck»	Monday: Elimination of Matilda	April 18	10.6	
5	21	«¿Bienvenido?»	«Welcome?»	Tuesday: Withdrew of Rodrigo and Locho's income	April 19	9.8	
5	22	«El enemigo público número Locho»	«Locho, the enemy»	Wednesday	April 20	9.9	
5	23	«Una noche con Silvina Love»	«One night with Silvina Love»	Thursday	April 21	11.0	
5	24	«Generación X»	«Generation X»	Friday	April 22	8.6	
5	25	«Duelo Senior»	«Duel Senior»	Monday: Elimination of Pato	April 25	10.2	
6	26	«Todos contra Locho»	«Everybody against Locho»	Tuesday	April 26	9.9	
6	27	«Amores cruzados»	«Crossed loves»	Wednesday	April 27	11.1	
6	28	«El ocaso del Padrino»	«Twilight of the Godfather»	Thursday	April 28	10.1	
6	29	«Caballos salvajes»	«Wild horses»	Friday	April 29	9.8	
6	30	«Amigas son las amigas»	«Friends are friends»	Monday: Elimination of Silvina	May 2	9.8	
7	31	«Locho no Staff solo»	«Locho is not Staff only»	Tuesday: Emily's income	May 3	10.2	
7	32	«Visitante y lustre»	«Visitor and luster»	Wednesday	May 4	9.2	
7	33	«La Nueva Luna»	«New Moon»	Thursday	May 5	10.5	
7	34	«¿Beso de despedida?»	«Goodbye kiss?»	Friday	May 6	10.4	
7	35	«Castigo ejemplar»	«Exemplary punishment»	Monday: Elimination of Walter	May 9	10.9	
8	36	«¿Familia en crisis?»	«Family in crisis?»	Tuesday	May 10	9.9	
8	37	«Se ha formado una pareja»	«It has been formed a couple»	Wednesday	May 11	9.9	
8	38	«Celos que matan»	«Jealousy that kills»	Thursday	May 12	10.8	
8	39	«Feliz cumple Sabrina»	«Happy birthday Sabrina»	Friday	May 13	10.2	
8	40	«Separados por la H.»	«Separated by the H.»	Monday: Elimination of Majo	May 16	11.5	
9	41	«Una vez más»	«One more time»	Tuesday	May 17	10.8	
9	42	«Demasiado relax»	«Too relax»	Wednesday	May 18	10.8	
9	43	«Locho no hace caso»	«Locho ignores»	Thursday	May 19	10.8	
9	44	«El nuevo Locho»	«The new Locho»	Friday	May 20	10.5	
9	45	«El arrepentido»	«The regretful»	Monday: Elimination of Lissa	May 23	12.1	
10	46	«Repechaje recargado»	«Recharged repechage»	Tuesday: Repechage	May 24	12.2	
10	47	«La guerra de Huéspedes vs. Staff»	«The war of Guests vs. Staff»	Wednesday	May 25	11.1	
10	48	«Basta de bromas»	«Enough jokes»	Thursday	May 26	11.4	
10	49	«El primer reingreso»	«The first re-entry»	Friday: Militta's re-entry	May 27	10.0	
10	50	«La definición»	«The definition»	Monday: Entry of Mónica and Turco	May 30	11.9	
11	51	«Una vez más»	«One more time»	Tuesday	May 31	10.2	
11	52	«Honor japonés»	«Japanese honor»	Wednesday	June 1	10.8	
11	53	«Solo»	«Alone»	Thursday	June 2	11.3	
11	54	«El accidente»	«The accident»	Friday: Mónica's withdrew and Lissa's re-entry	June 3	11.4	
11	55	«Ataque de pánico»	«Panic attack»	Monday: Elimination of Militta	June 6	10.8	
12	56	«La hora de Martín»	«The time of Martín»	Tuesday	June 7	10.7	
12	57	«Hay que terminar con la familia»	«We have to end with the family»	Wednesday	June 8	9.7	
12	58	«Locho busca protección»	«Locho in search of protection»	Thursday	June 9	9.5	
12	59	«¿Traición?»	«Treason?»	Friday	June 10	10.4	
12	60	«La H. por el poder»	«The H. for power»	Monday: Elimination of Turco	June 13	10.9	
13	61	«Los sanguinarios»	«The bloodthirsty»	Tuesday	June 14	11.9	
13	62	«Guerra entre familias»	«War between families»	Wednesday	June 15	10.2	
13	63	«Chanchi en su laberinto»	«Chanchi in his labyrinth»	Thursday	June 16	10.5	
13	64	«Se cumple la estrategia»	«The strategy is fulfilled»	Friday	June 17	10.5	
13	65	«Sorpresa en la H.»	«Surprise in the H»	Monday	June 20	11.4	
14	66	«Acá reinan los sanguinarios»	«The bloodthirsty reign here»	Tuesday: Elimination of Sabrina, Chanchi's withdrew and Walter's re-entry	June 21	11.8	
14	67	«Acorralados»	«Trapped»	Wednesday	June 22	10.0	
14	68	«La celebración»	«The celebration»	Thursday	June 23	11.0	
14	69	«Última noche en pareja»	«Last night together»	Friday	June 24	10.2	
14	70	«Duelo de novias»	«Girlfriends duel»	Monday: Elimination of Emily	June 27	11.5	
15	71	«La unificación»	«The unification»	Tuesday	June 28	10.7	
15	72	«¿Me querés?»	«Do you love me?»	Wednesday	June 29	10.7	
15	73	«Huéspedes picantes»	«Spicy guests»	Thursday: Visit of Matilda and Majo (V.I.P guests)	June 30	10.7	
15	74	«Último golpe a la familia»	«Last blow to the family»	Friday	July 1	9.7	
16	75	«Duelo de amigos»	«Duel of friends»	Monday: Elimination of Imanol	July 4	10.2	
16	76	«Es tiempo de Locho»	«It's time of Locho»	Tuesday	July 5	8.9	
16	77	«Antiguos huespedes»	«Former guests»	Wednesday: Visit of Silvina and Turco (V.I.P guests)	July 6	9.8	
16	78	«Desafío accidentado»	«Bumpy challenge»	Thursday	July 7	10.7	
16	79	«Arrivederci amore mio»		Friday: Withdrew of Melody and Majo's entrance	July 8	11.0	
17	80	«Estadía agitada»	«Hectic stay»	Monday: Elimination of Majo and visit of Pampita and Ana (V.I.P guests)	July 11	11.5	
17	81	«Anita»		Tuesday	July 12	10.7	
17	82	«Alta tensión»	«High voltage»	Wednesday	July 13	10.0	
17	83	«Martín vs. Walter y Locho»	«Martín v.s. Walter and Locho»	Thursday: Visit of Pato, Imanol and Nicolás (V.I.P guests)	July 14	10.6	
17	84	«¿Una nueva traición?»	«A new betrayal?»	Friday	July 15	10.7	
18	85	«Amigos en la H»	«Friends on the H»	Monday: Elimination of Locho	July 18	9.9	
18	86	«El primer finalista»	«The first finalist»	Tuesday	July 19	9.4	
18	87	«El segundo finalista»	«The second finalist»	Wednesday: Elimination of Lissa and Walter	July 20	10.7	
18	88	«El comienzo de la Gran Final»	«The start of the Grand Finale»	Thursday	July 21	9.7	
18	89	«La batalla final»	«The finale battle»	Monday: Final - Consagration of Álex Caniggia as winner	July 25	13.6	

Notes
Most viewed chapter.
It was the most viewed of the day.
