= Álex Caniggia =

Argentine reality TV personality

Alex Caniggia
- Born: Alexander Dimitri Paul Caniggia; 15 February 1993 (age 33); Buenos Aires, Argentina
- Years active: 2010–present
- Parent: Claudio Caniggia (father)
- Relatives: Charlotte Caniggia (sister)

Alexander Dimitri Paul Caniggia (born 15 February 1993) is an Argentine model, influencer, singer, actor and media personality. His twin sister is Charlotte Caniggia, also an influencer. He is the son of retired professional footballer Claudio Caniggia with retired model Mariana Nannis.

== Biography ==
Son of the former soccer player Claudio Caniggia and the media personality Mariana Nannis, twin brother of the actress Charlotte Caniggia and brother of the artist Kevin Axel Caniggia, his grandparents on his father's side were Vicente Hugo Caniggia (died in 2014) and Nélida Tomasa Iglesias de Caniggia (died in 1996). He grew up, due to his father's career, in different parts of the world including Portugal, Italy, Scotland and Spain, more specifically Marbella, where he lived the most of his life in the years of his childhood and adolescence, in 2012 he traveled to Argentina where he currently resides.

=== Career ===
His television appearances began in 1998, in different television specials, along with his mother Mariana Nannis. In 2010, when Alex participated, along with his mother and his twin sister Charlotte Caniggia, in Mujeres ricas, a reality show broadcast in 2010 by La Sexta in Spain: although he was not the protagonist of the show, Alex began his taste for exposing himself to cameras showing his various eccentricities. As a singer, Alex released the singles Siempre al top, Quien lo diría, Dancing in the club, Congelé mi corazón, Amiga na’ más, Barats and Charlotte, Champagne, Choripan, although his clips stood out more for the controversies than for the musical. Alex acted in the film Bañeros 5: Lentos y cargosos.

Alex made his first appearance on Argentine television when he went to support his sister, who was participating in Bailando 2012 (hosted by Tinelli). With his eccentric personality, Alex captivated the host Marcelo Tinelli, and entered the competition to take the place of the boxer Maravilla Martinez who voluntarily left. Alex teamed up with Astrid Kadomoto, as a coach, and dancer Sofia Macaggi, as a dancer partner who would later become his romantic partner. After remaining 172 days of competition overcoming seven sentences in which Alex eliminated figures such as Karina Jelinek / María Vázquez and Verónica Perdomo, Alex is eliminated with 40.44% of the votes of the television public against the actress and host Florencia Peña, staying with the 9th position. In theater Alex acted in the theatrical work Despedida de casado in 2013 and also in Escuela de Pijudos in 2020.

Due to his great fury on television, Alex debuted with his sister and a large cast in the theatrical work Despedida de casados in which a scandalous exit of him and his sister would take place due to an alleged debt; in 2013 after 1 year of relationship Alex separates from Sofia Macaggi whom he met in Bailando 2012. During 2017 to 2019 he participated and starred with his sister in the reality show Caniggia libre, which had three seasons, in which we are presented with their lives as millionaires, their adventures, fights, parties, and his unimputable criteria. In 2019 Alex entered in the Chilean reality show Resistiré, in which all the participants were abandoned in a shelter located in the Andes Mountains, in the middle of nowhere and without beds, indoor bathrooms, prepared food or drinking water supply, but with the half million dollars that corresponds to the final prize: he was the third eliminated after losing the duel against the Colombian Zuleidy Aguilar. A month later Alex returns in this reality, accompanied by his sister, but after 9 days they both left.

In 2020 Alex participated in the television singing contest, hosted by Marcelo Tinelli and in which Alex was the first disqualified, named Cantando 2020, that is the fifth season of the television format Cantando por un Sueño. In 2021 Alex took part in the second season of gastronomy reality show contest MasterChef Celebrity Argentina, hosted by Santiago del Moro and in which Alex obtained the 7th place: in the same year he was a panelist in the humorous program Polémica en el bar, hosted by Mariano Iúdica. In 2022 he was the winner of the first season of El hotel de los famosos, reality show hosted by Pampita and Leandro Leunis.

== Filmography ==
=== Reality shows ===
Time	Title	Role	Notes
2010	Mujeres ricas	Himself	Recurring cast
2012, 2016	Bailando por un Sueño	Contestant Himself	9th place; season 8 Guest; season 11
2017–2019	MTV Caniggia libre	Himself	Lead role
2019	RE$I$TIRÉ	Contestant	23rd place
2020	Cantando	Contestant	23rd place; season 5
2021	MasterChef Celebrity Argentina	Contestant	7th place; season 2
2022, 2023	El Hotel de los Famosos	Contestant Himself	Winner; season 1 Guest; season 2
2023	Gran Hermano VIP	Contestant	13th place; season 8
2026	The 50	Contestant	10th place
2026	Juego de villanos	Contestant	TBA

=== Programs ===
Year	Title	Role	Notes
2021	Polémica en el bar	Panellist	
2023	Los desconocidos de siempre	Host	
2024	Toda	Host	Web show
2025	Por el mundo	Guest co-host	

=== Film ===
Year	Title	Role	Notes
2018	Bañeros 5: Lentos y cargosos	Alex	
2020	Elite a la Argentina	Himself	Short promotion of the third season of Elite.

== Discography ==
=== Singles ===
- Quien lo diría
- Dancing in the club
- Siempre al Top
- Charlotte, Champagne, Choripan
- Barats
- Congelé mi corazón
- Amiga Na’ Mas
