= Vivir intentando =

- Directed by: Tomás Yankelevich
- Written by: Carolina Hughes; Alejandro Sapognikoff; Tomás Yankelevich
- Produced by: Pablo Bossi; Juan Pablo Buscarini
- Starring: Ivonne Guzmán; Lourdes Cecilia Fernández; Valeria Gastaldi; Virginia Da Cunha; María Elizabeth Vera
- Cinematography: Miguel Abal
- Edited by: Juan Carlos Macías
- Music by: Fernando López Rossi; Diego Grimblat
- Production companies: Patagonik Film Group; RGB
- Distributed by: Buena Vista International
- Release date: 14 June 2003
- Running time: 95 minutes
- Country: Argentina
- Language: Spanish

Vivir intentando (English: Go for It) is a 2003 Argentine family musical film starring the 5 members of girl group Bandana.

The film provides a fictional account of the band's formation, and was premiered on 14 June 2003 in Buenos Aires.

== Cast ==
- Ivonne Guzmán as Ivonne
- Lourdes Cecilia Fernández as Lourdes
- Valeria Gastaldi as Valeria
- Virginia Da Cunha as Viri
- María Elizabeth Vera as Lissa

== Critical reception ==
The film met with mixed reviews.

One critic claimed it a success "thanks to the competent technical aspects, precise use of emotion that plays with the audience, but above all, the atmosphere which it creates in the cinema."

Others were less complimentary, commenting "their acting talents are just passable.....the songs shine due to the absence thereof..... and the script comes straight from the 'teenager dreams of being a singer' handbook" In spite of this, the movie grossed over ARS 1,500,000.
