= Ruggieri =

Ruggieri is an Italian surname. Notable people with the surname include:

- Claude Ruggieri (1777–1841), French fireworks producer and designer
- Francesco Ruggieri (1628–1698), Italian luthier (maker of violins and related instruments), whose children were notable luthiers as well
- Marina Ruggieri, Italian engineer
- Michele Ruggieri (1543–1607), Italian Jesuit missionary in China, the first European sinologist
- Ève Ruggieri (born 1939), French television and radio producer
- Ruggieri degli Ubaldini, Italian archbishop mentioned in Dante's Divine Comedy

The Ruggieri family name is spread all over the last few centuries. In 1210 AD, King Roger the First ruler southern Italy and Sicily and from his rule many people took his name. The first name was always shown last; therefore, the family names were shown in front. For example, Micale Ruggieri. Roger was translated into the singular Ruggiero group of Ruggiero's became the plural Rogers or Ruggieri.

The first to show up was in the 1400s when Geromino Ruggieri was a member of Christopher Columbus' crew on the Santa Maria. Then, the first Catholic missionary to enter China about 1565 was Micale Ruggieri, a Jesuit, (Marco Polo went to China earlier, but he was a merchant). When the Jesuit Micale returned to Italy, he was assigned to Florence where he taught relatives the art of making firework displays that he learned in China. The Ruggieri's became world renowned for their great ability to construct firework displays that rivaled the Aurora Borealis.

== See also ==
- Ruggeri
