= Abigail Pereira =

Uruguayan entertainer

- Born: Abigail Pereira Ávila; 27 January 1986 (age 40); Montevideo, Uruguay
- Occupation: Entertainer

Abigail Pereira Ávila (born 27 January 1986) is a Uruguayan artist, actress, vedette, singer, and dancer.

== Biography ==
The daughter of Graciela Ávila and Walter Pereira, Abigail Pereira has appeared on several television programs such as El show del mediodía, Bailando por un Sueño 2007, and Yo soy el artista. She was on the cover of the magazine Semanario in 2007.

], in 2007, Pereira managed to change her name on her identity card and passport. In 2013 her birth certificate was rectified in the Civil Registry, where many changes like this are not accepted. In 2009 she suffered a health breakdown.

Currently working for the Telemundo network and residing in Miami, United States, Pereira became the first trans Uruguayan to have permanent resident by extraordinary ability documents as a woman in the United States.

In 2012, she became a spokesperson in ads for the Uruguayan Consular Card (TCU). Pereira was a contestant on Telemundo's Yo Soy El Artista in 2014, and in 2015, she appeared in the Brazilian film Neon Bull.

== Television ==
- 2007, Bailando por un sueño
- 2007–2008, El show del mediodía
- 2014, Yo Soy El Artista
- Suelta la sopa
- 2017, Algo contigo
- 2023, El hotel de los famosos (season 2)
