= Bandana (pop band) =

Argentine pop girl group

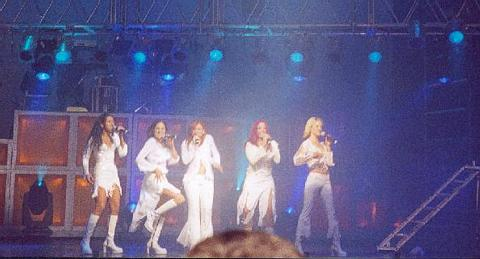
- Bandana performing in Buenos Aires

Background information
- Origin: Buenos Aires, Argentina
- Genres: Pop; dance-pop; teen pop
- Years active: 2001–2004; 2016–present
- Labels: Sony BMG (2001–04); Sony Music Entertainment (2016–present)
- Members: Lourdes Cecilia Fernández; María Elizabeth Vera; Virginia Da Cunha; Valeria Gastaldi
- Past members: Ivonne Guzmán

Bandana is an Argentine pop girl group formed in 2001. Following the international trend of teen pop girl groups established by the Spice Girls, the five members of Bandana — Ivonne Guzmán, Lourdes Cecilia Fernández, Valeria Gastaldi, Virginia Da Cunha and María Elizabeth Vera — were selected on the TV show Popstars and were a carefully marketed product that became a phenomenon in the country, particularly among young girls.

== History ==
Their self-titled debut album was released in 2001 on Sony BMG Records, led by the hit single "Guapas", and was certified four-times platinum by the CAPIF. Despite being initially snubbed by many critics and artists, Bandana emerged as Argentina's best-selling act since 2001.

At the time of their disbandment in 2004, the combined sales of Bandana's three studio albums were estimated to be 450,000 copies sold. Their career was marked by several landmarks for Argentine musicians — specially bearing in mind the 1998–2002 Argentine great depression: 280 thousand tickets were sold to see them perform in the Teatro Gran Rex (with a total of 86 concerts in the venue); they performed twice for a total of 90 thousand people in the José Amalfitani Stadium; and released Vivir intentando, a film starring themselves that was seen by over 1 million people.

In 2016, Bandana announced a reunion concert (without Ivonne Guzmán) at the Lola Membrives Theatre in Buenos Aires; due to the high demand for tickets, the group has added five more dates. The concerts sold out within an hour and a half. The band also released a new album, titled La Vuelta which contains new versions of some of their biggest hits. On January 16, 2017, the band released their first original song ever since 2003 entitled "Bombón". The following day, da Cunha announced her departure from the band. In March, 2017 the 3 Bandana members, Lourdes, Valeria and Lisa, flew to the US to record the music video for their first single since their comeback, "Bombón" featuring Wisin. The music video was produced and directed by Lourival Rodriguez and co-directed by Ruslan Shakirov. It was shot in a Mansion in Miami Beach, FL.

Following da Cunha's departure, the band continues to release new singles, including "No No No" and "Baila" in 2018, and their latest single, "En la Punta de la Lengua" in February 2019.

== Members ==
The original group consisted of 5 girls:

- Ivonne Guzmán (2001—04)
- Lourdes Cecilia Fernández (2001—04, 2016—present)
- Valeria Gastaldi (2001—04, 2016—20)
- Virginia Da Cunha (2001—04, 2016—17)
- María Elizabeth Vera (2001—04, 2016—present)

All the girls hailed from Buenos Aires, apart from Guzmán, who is a native of Colombia.

Upon the band's comeback tour in 2016, Guzmán decided not to return, being the only member who did not rejoin. Guzmán's role was not replaced.

On January 17, 2017, da Cunha revealed through her Instagram account she had left the band to focus on her solo career. The rest of the members announced subsequently that they would not replace da Cunha and instead, would continue as a 3-girl group.

Gastaldi left the band in 2020, leaving Lissa and Lourdes as the only remaining members. Now as a duo, they released their latest single, "Fuego".

== Casting ==
Formed in 2001 on the reality TV show Popstars, 5 girls were selected from 5,000's of contestants who had attended the casting. Their emergence coincided with a period of nationwide economic depression. As such, their success contrasted greatly with the general mood of the country, & one of the judges commented that "this was an opportunity to shine at a very downbeat moment for Argentina". The final line-up was unusual in the sense that the girls didn't conform to traditional ideas of beauty: Ivonne wore braces & Lourdes was known as la peti (shorty) due to her height. Judge Afo Verde noted that "appearance didn't matter to us, what each girl conveyed was most important".

== Musical history ==
Their first self-titled album, Bandana, was the best-selling album of 2001 in Argentina, turning platinum soon after release and achieving 4 platinum certifications. It spawned a number of hits including Cómo Puede Ser, Guapas & Maldita Noche. They also completed a successful tour, selling out Buenos Aires' biggest theatre, Teatro Gran Rex, more than 40 times during winter vacations (July). Later in 2002, they recorded a Spanish version of Can't Help Falling in Love by Elvis Presley (Muero De Amor Por Tí), for the Disney film Lilo & Stitch . In 2002, they released their second album, Noche (Night), which wasn't as successful as the first but it was still the best-selling album of 2002 in Argentina. In 2003, they released their third studio album, titled Vivir Intentando which was also the soundtrack of their film of the same name released during the same year. They also won Best New Artist—Southeast at the MTV Video Music Awards Latin America. In December 2002, they performed a joint concert with Mambrú in the José Amalfitani Stadium with over 40,000 tickets sold.

In order to promote themselves internationally, they traveled to the USA, appearing in New York & Miami & also featuring on the cover of Billboard Magazine. This was notable for being the first time that an Argentine group had achieved this feat.

In 2016 they are back in order to do several shows and a tour around the country. They revealed through interviews that reuniting had always been a possibility, but it kept being postponed due to some of the members' pregnancies and other professional commitments. A new album, La Vuelta was released to celebrate their reunion, which contains revised versions of some of their biggest hits. The track list is also the set list of their tour.

On January 16, 2017, the group released their first original song since 2003 entitled "Bombón" featuring Puerto Rican rapper Wisin. The following day, da Cunha revealed she had left the band, hence why she did not participate in the recording of this song. This brand new song serves as the main theme of one of Telefé's reality show, Despedida de Soltero (Stag Party).

== Cultural impact ==
Following on from a trend established by the Spice Girls in the UK & internationally in the late 1990s, Bandana became a carefully marketed product which was especially popular among young girls. Many licensed products with their brand were available to purchase, and contributed to the heightened interest in the group, occasionally referred to as 'Bandanamania'. Their signature bandanas of varying colours were quickly imitated by the teen population, as were their lyrics & dance routines.

From 2001 to 2003, there was an official Bandana store selling much merchandise. The store was located at Avenida Corrientes, right besides Teatro Gran Rex.

== Vivir Intentando (Go For It - Cinco Amigas) ==
In 2003 they released their first movie, Vivir Intentando, filmed on location in Buenos Aires. It premiered in Argentina on 14 June 2003, and met with mixed reviews. One critic claimed it a success "thanks to the competent technical aspects, precise use of emotion that plays with the audience, but above all, the atmosphere which it creates in the cinema". Others were less complimentary, commenting "their acting talents are just passable.....the songs shine due to the absence thereof.....& the script comes straight from the 'teenager dreams of being a singer' handbook". In spite of this, the movie grossed over ARS 10,500,000. and had a bigger B.O. than many international blockbusters.

== Discography ==
=== Albums ===
- Bandana (2001)
  - Label: Virgin Records, Jive Records US, [BMG] LA
- Noche (2002)
  - Label: BMG, Jive Records US, [BMG] LA
- Vivir Intentando (Go for It) (2003)
  - Label: BMG, Jive Records US, [BMG] LA
- Hasta Siempre (2004) - Live Hits album
  - Label: Jive Records US, Sony BMG Music Entertainment AR
- La Vuelta (2016) - Remix album
  - Label: Sony Music Entertainment AR

=== DVDs ===
- Vivir Intentando (2003)
- Hasta Siempre (2004) - Live hits

=== Tours ===
- Gira Argentina (2002–2003)
- Gira España y Latin America' (2003–2004)
- Gira Argentina: Hasta Siempre (2004)
- Bandana: La Vuelta (2016)

=== Singles ===
- 2001: "Guapas"
- 2002: "Cómo Puede Ser"
- 2002: "Maldita Noche"
- 2002: "Doce Horas"
- 2002: "Muero de Amor Por Ti" (for the film Lilo & Stitch)
- 2002: "Llega La Noche"
- 2002: "Un Demonio"
- 2003: "Necesito Tu Amor"
- 2003: "Hoy Empieza"
- 2003: "Sigo Dando Vueltas"
- 2003: "Hasta El Día de Hoy"
- 2004: "¿Qué Pasa Con Vos?"
- 2004: "A Bailar"
- 2004: "Canto Con Vos"
- 2016: "Llega La Noche" (2016 version)
- 2017: "Bombón" (feat. Wisin)
- 2018: "No No No"
- 2018: "Baila"
- 2019: "En la Punta de la Lengua"
- 2026: "El Fuego Intacto"

== Awards and nominations ==
- MTV Video Music Awards Latin America
  - 2002: Best New Artist – WON
- Premios CAPIF:
  - 2002: Best Pop Band – Nominated
  - 2002: Best New Artist – Nominated
  - 2002: Best Music Publishing – Nominated
  - 2003: Best Pop Album – Nominated
  - 2004: Best Pop Album – Nominated

== See also ==
- List of all-female bands
