= Claudio Caniggia =

Argentine footballer

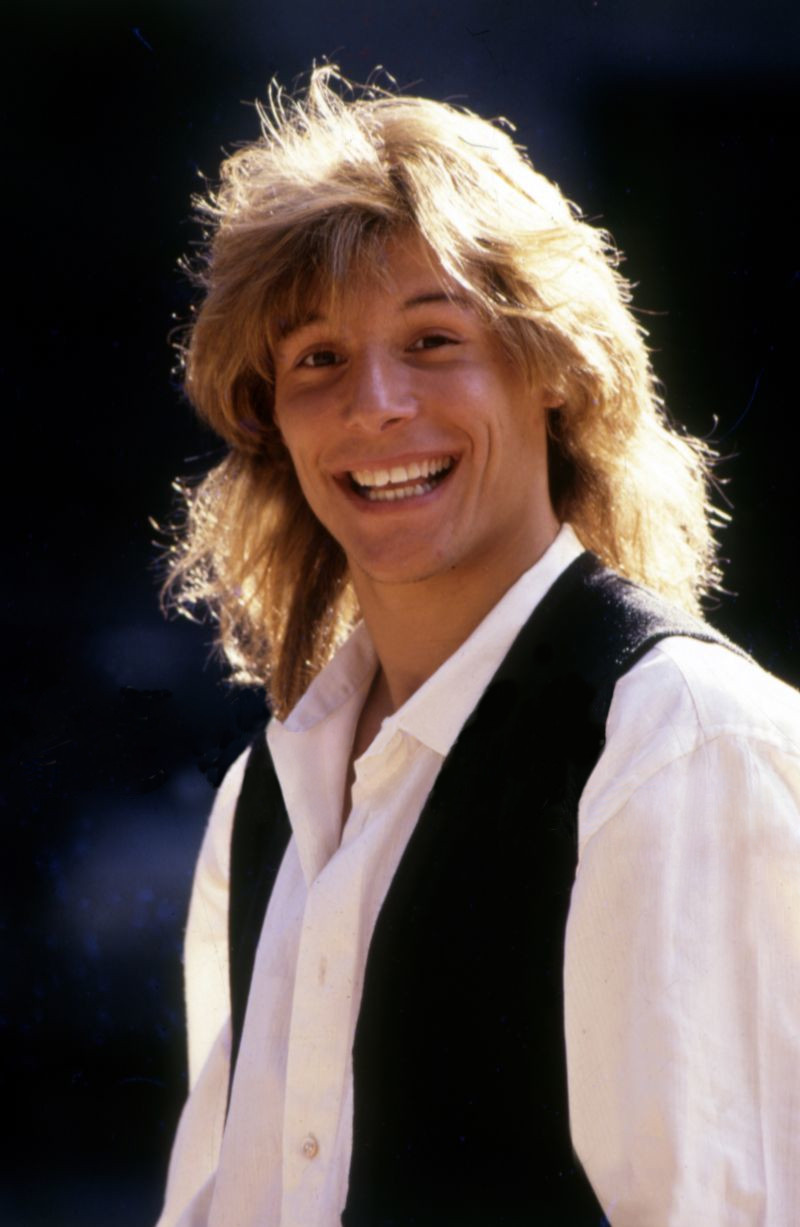
- Caniggia in 1988

Personal information
- Full name: Claudio Paul Caniggia
- Date of birth: 9 January 1967 (age 59)
- Place of birth: Henderson, Buenos Aires, Argentina
- Height: 1.73 m (5 ft 8 in)
- Positions: Forward; winger

Senior career*
Years	Team	Apps	(Gls)
1985–1988	River Plate	53	(8)
1988–1989	Hellas Verona	21	(3)
1989–1992	Atalanta	85	(26)
1992–1994	Roma	15	(4)
1994–1995	Benfica	24	(8)
1995–1998	Boca Juniors	58	(22)
1999–2000	Atalanta	17	(1)
2000–2001	Dundee	21	(7)
2001–2003	Rangers	50	(13)
2003–2004	Qatar SC	15	(5)
2012	Wembley	0	(0)
Total		359	(97)

International career
1987–2002	Argentina	50	(16)
Medal record
Men's football
Representing Argentina
Copa América
Winner	1991 Chile
FIFA Confederations Cup
Winner	1992 Saudi Arabia
CONMEBOL–UEFA Cup of Champions
Winner	1993 Argentina
FIFA World Cup
Runner-up	1990 Italy
- * Club domestic league appearances and goals

Claudio Paul Caniggia (Spanish: [ˈklawðjo kaˈnixja, - kaˈniʝa]; born 9 January 1967) is an Argentine former professional footballer who played as forward or winger.

He started his career with River Plate in Argentina, winning the league once, before moving to Italy in 1988 where he spent the next six years with Hellas Verona, Atalanta, and Roma, scoring 44 goals in 155 competitive matches. He joined Benfica in Portugal for one season and then returned to Argentina in 1995 with Boca Juniors. After two seasons, he joined Italian side Atalanta, before three seasons in Scotland with Dundee and Rangers, where he won five major trophies with the latter in two seasons. After a short stint with Qatar SC, he retired from professional football in 2004.

Caniggia played 50 times for the Argentina national team between 1987 and 2002. He appeared in three World Cups. At the 1990 World Cup, Caniggia scored two goals as Argentina reached the final but was suspended for the defeat against West Germany. Caniggia also scored two goals at the 1994 World Cup. He also represented Argentina at the 1991 Copa América and 1992 Confederations Cup, both of which Argentina won.

== Club career ==
At club level, Caniggia played for River Plate (1985–88), Hellas Verona (1988–89), Atalanta (1989–92 and 1999–2000), Roma (1992–93), S.L. Benfica (1994–95), Boca Juniors (1995–98), Dundee (2000–01) and Rangers (2001–03). He has become a club legend and cult-hero at many of the clubs he has played at, for instance when scoring against Dunfermline in 2003 to help Rangers win the title.

In 1988, Caniggia moved to Serie A club Hellas Verona after accumulating 53 appearances and 8 goals for River Plate. He then moved to Atalanta in 1989, where he would remain for three years and score 26 goals in 85 league games. With Atalanta, he competed twice in the UEFA Cup, helping the club reach the quarter-finals in the 1990–91 edition. Despite not winning any silverware, Caniggia later described his experience with Atalanta as "the best years in his career".

Caniggia moved to Roma in 1992, a move both parties believed would help the club aim for the Scudetto, though Roma lost its momentum mid-season with only 15 points from 17 games. After a 1–1 draw against Napoli on 21 March 1993, following a surprise doping test, Caniggia was handed a 13-month ban for taking cocaine; he has a history of enjoying the high life. After his ban expired, he joined Benfica on a year-long loan financed by the Parmalat dairy company. During his Benfica run, Valencia contacted him. He played with the white kit during a friendly match where Valencia faced Brazil in Mestalla. He played as a guest player in a team where Tenerife player Diego Latorre was also included in the squad. Valencia had to pay 80 million pesetas for the inclusion of both players for that friendly, receiving only 66 million in ticket sales.

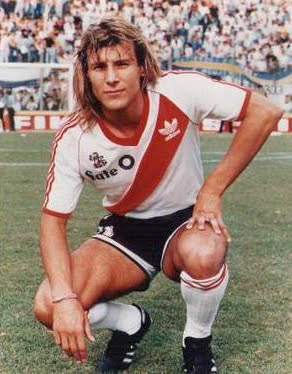
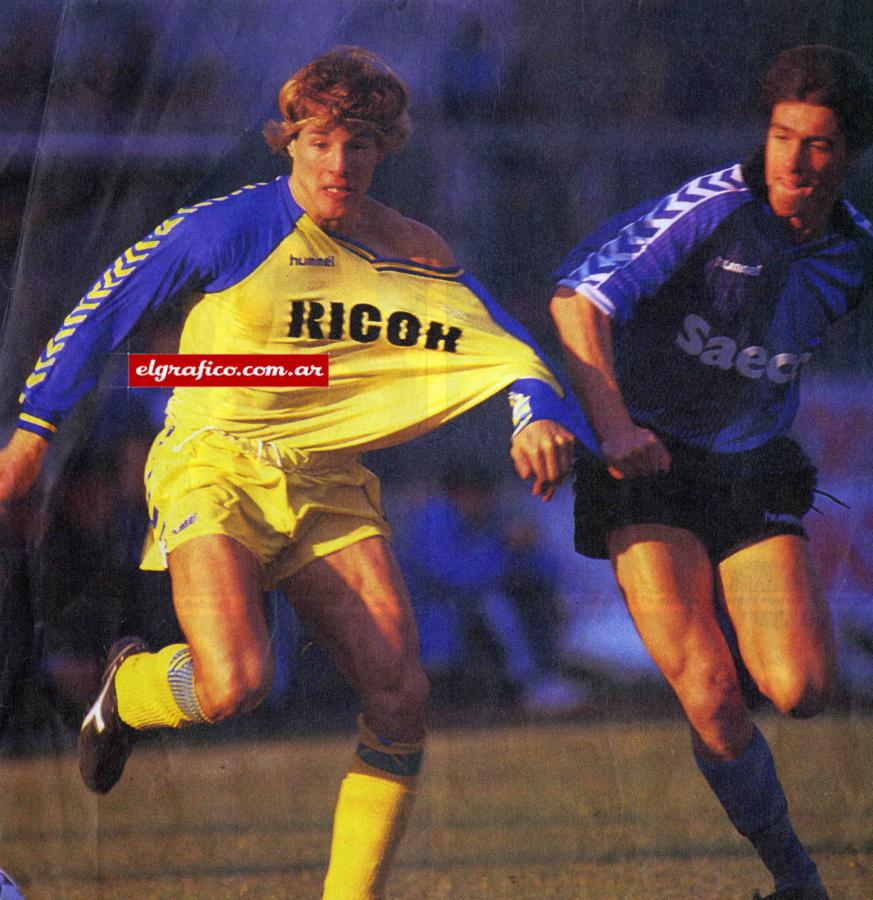
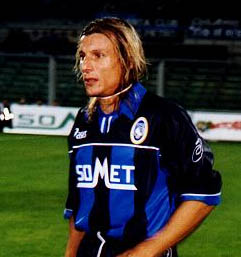
Three moments in the club career of Caniggia: with River Plate (1987), Hellas Verona (1988) and Atalanta (1999)

Argentine media mogul Eduardo Eurnekian then acquired the rights to Caniggia from Roma and Diego Maradona from Racing Club de Avellaneda, loaning them to Boca Juniors in exchange for matches played on his television stations. At the completion of his one-year contract, Caniggia's outspoken wife refused to return to Argentina and he was heavily linked with clubs in England. In September 1996 his mother committed suicide by jumping from the fifth floor of her building and Caniggia did not play in the 1996–97 season. He returned to play for Boca in 1997–98 but his appearances were sporadic as he missed out on the 1998 World Cup squad. After another season of inactivity he re-joined Atalanta in Serie B, helping the club achieve promotion to Serie A, but left after one season following a dispute with coach Giovanni Vavassori. He then signed for Scottish club Dundee, managed by Ivano Bonnetti whom he knew well from their time together in Italy. Quickly becoming Dundee's star player, he was shortlisted for SPFA Player of the Year in 2001, but was then transferred to Rangers, becoming a fans favourite at Ibrox, after scoring against arch rivals Celtic in a cup final.

In June 2012, he was one of several former professional footballers who agreed to join Wembley to play in their FA Cup campaign for the new season. Caniggia and fellow former-internationals Ray Parlour, Martin Keown, Graeme Le Saux, Jaime Moreno, Danny Dichio and Brian McBride, plus David Seaman (goalkeeping coach) and former England manager Terry Venables (technical advisor), came out of retirement to play for Wembley who were featured in a television documentary as they endeavoured to help the club play at Wembley Stadium. On 12 August 2012, he appeared in a preliminary round of the FA Cup. Aged 45, he scored the first goal in a 3–2 win against Langford.

== International career ==
Caniggia was a key player in both the 1990 and 1994 World Cups, but was not picked under the strict regime of coach Daniel Passarella for France '98.

Caniggia was capped 50 times for Argentina, scoring 16 goals. He played at the 1990 and 1994 World Cups, scoring four goals in eight matches. Contrary to popular belief and largely due to loose interpretation, Caniggia was not a pure striker, but rather a playmaker or creative forward.

Caniggia was good friends with Argentina legend Diego Maradona; while playing for Boca Juniors, the duo celebrated a goal in the Superclásico of the 1996 Clausura with a kiss on the lips. Claudio's wife at that time, model Mariana Nannis, said: "At times I believe Diego is in love with my husband. It must be the long hair and big muscles."

=== 1990 World Cup ===
At the 1990 World Cup in Italy, Caniggia scored two key goals to help Argentina reach the final. He came off the bench in the inaugural match against Cameroon in Milan, memorably being fouled three times in a single dribble as he carried the ball forward, the last, by Benjamin Massing earning the Cameroonian a straight red card (Massing kicked Caniggia so hard his own shoe came off). In the subsequent matches, Caniggia was in the starting lineup. In the second round, Argentina faced Brazil in Turin, and with the score 0–0 after 80 minutes, a pass by Diego Maradona left Caniggia one on one against Brazilian goalkeeper Taffarel; Caniggia dribbled past him and scored on the empty goal, giving Argentina the victory and eliminating Brazil from the tournament in what was seen as a huge upset. The goal gave him legendary status among the Argentine fans for knocking out their chief rivals.

Argentina then beat Yugoslavia in Florence on penalty kicks, advancing to the semi-finals, where they played against Italy in Naples. The Italians had not conceded any goals in five matches, and were up 1–0 at half-time. In the second half, Caniggia headed a cross into the net of goalkeeper Walter Zenga, ending his record streak at 517 minutes without conceding a goal, and sending the match into extra time. After no change in the score, penalty kicks were taken, and Argentina won again through this method, advancing to the final. Caniggia had been cautioned in the team's second first round match against the Soviet Union, and then received another yellow card against Italy for deliberately handling the ball, which earned him a suspension (disciplinary records were not wiped out between the first and second rounds at that time). He had to watch the final between his team and West Germany from the stands in Rome, which Argentina lost 1–0.

=== 1991 Copa América, 1992 Confederations Cup and 1993 CONMEBOL–UEFA Cup of Champions ===
Throughout the 1991 Copa América, Caniggia asserted his dominance and was arguably the most dynamic player; he scored two goals and made four assists in the tournament as Argentina won the title. He also helped Argentina win the 1992 Confederations Cup, in which he scored a goal in the final itself. In February 1993, he scored the goal of the 1–1 tie between Argentina and Denmark in the CONMEBOL–UEFA Cup of Champions, held in Mar del Plata. Argentina finally won by penalties and was declared intercontinental champion.

=== 1994 World Cup ===
Caniggia scored two goals in the 1994 World Cup in the USA, both of them in the first round match against Nigeria in Boston The first from a Gabriel Batistuta free kick rebound and second one from a free kick by Diego Maradona, which he finished, putting the ball in top right hand corner. He was taken out of Argentina's third game against Bulgaria 26 minutes into the match in the boiling heat of Dallas, an Argentine team who had lost Maradona. He was left out of the Argentine squad for the team's Round of 16 match against Romania in Los Angeles; Argentina lost 3–2 and were out of the tournament.

=== 2002 World Cup ===
After refusing to cut his long hair despite the rules of national coach Daniel Passarella, he was frozen out of the national team for a number of years. He made a brief comeback to the Marcelo Bielsa-coached squad for the 2002 World Cup, but did not play. He received a red card for cursing at the referee from the bench in Argentina's last match against Sweden, becoming the first player to be sent off from the bench in a World Cup.

== Style of play ==
A quick and physically strong forward, with good technique and dribbling skills, Caniggia was known in particular for his exceptional speed as a player; he competed in athletics before his football career, taking part in athletic tournaments at the provincial level, running the 100 meters. In addition to his ability to score goals consistently, he was also equally capable of playing off other forwards, and of creating chances for teammates; as such, although he was capable of playing as a striker, he was often deployed in deeper roles as an advanced playmaker or creative forward, or even more frequently out wide as a winger. Due to his explosive running, which enabled him to get past opponents consistently, throughout his career, he was nicknamed El Hijo del Viento ("Son of the Wind") and El Pájaro ("The Bird"). Despite his reputation as one of Argentina's greatest players ever, he was also known to be a controversial player. In addition to his playing ability and goalscoring, Caniggia stood out for his recognisable long blonde hair.

== Post-retirement ==
Caniggia has served as a football agent for players such as Ian Subiabre and Luis Ingolotti.

== Personal life ==
Caniggia was married to Mariana Nannis. They had three children: Kevin Axel, Álex Dimitri and Charlotte Chantal. In September 2019, Caniggia asked his wife for a divorce and started dating Sofia Bonelli, a 26-year-old Argentine model. In November 2019 he and Bonelli got married in Tulum, Mexico.

== Career statistics ==
=== Club ===
Appearances and goals by club, season and competition
Club	Season	League			National cup		Continental		Other^{1}		Total	
Club	Season	Division	Apps	Goals	Apps	Goals	Apps	Goals	Apps	Goals	Apps	Goals
River Plate	1985–86	Argentine Primera División	1	0	–		–		–		1	0
River Plate	1986–87	Argentine Primera División	24	3	–		–		–		24	3
River Plate	1987–88	Argentine Primera División	28	5	–		–		–		28	5
River Plate	Total		53	8	–		–		–		53	8
Verona	1988–89	Serie A	21	3	9	3	–		–		30	6
Atalanta	1989–90	Serie A	31	8	3	2	2	0	–		36	10
Atalanta	1990–91	Serie A	23	10	–		5	0	–		28	10
Atalanta	1991–92	Serie A	31	8	4	1	–		–		35	9
Atalanta	Total		85	26	7	3	7	0	–		99	29
Roma	1992–93	Serie A	15	4	6	2	4	3	–		25	9
Roma	1993–94	Serie A	–		–		–		–		–	
Roma	Total		15	4	6	2	4	3	–		25	9
Benfica	1994–95	Primeira Divisão	24	8	3	5	7	3	–		34	16
Boca Juniors	1995–96	Argentine Primera División	29	12	–		–		–		29	12
Boca Juniors	1996–97	Argentine Primera División	–		–		–		–		–	
Boca Juniors	1997–98	Argentine Primera División	17	5	–		–		–		17	5
Boca Juniors	1998–99	Argentine Primera División	12	5	–		–		–		12	5
Boca Juniors	Total		58	22	–		–		–		58	22
Atalanta	1999–2000	Serie B	17	1	3	1	–		–		20	2
Dundee	2000–01	Scottish Premier League	21	7	–		–		–		21	7
Rangers	2001–02	Scottish Premier League	24	5	3	0	11	2	4 (Note: Appearances in Scottish League Cup)	2	42	9
Rangers	2002–03	Scottish Premier League	26	8	4	1	2	0	4	3	36	12
Rangers	Total		50	13	7	1	13	2	8	5	78	21
Qatar SC	2003–04	Qatar Stars League	15	5	–		–		–		15	5
Career total			359	97	35	15	31	8	8	5	433	125

=== International ===
Appearances and goals by national team and year
National team	Year	Apps	Goals
Argentina	1987	6	2
Argentina	1988	3	1
Argentina	1989	7	2
Argentina	1990	10	3
Argentina	1991	6	2
Argentina	1992	5	1
Argentina	1993	2	1
Argentina	1994	6	3
Argentina	1996	3	0
Argentina	2002	2	0
Total		50	15

Scores and results list Argentina's goal tally first, score column indicates score after each Caniggia goal.

List of international goals scored by Claudio Caniggia
No.	Date	Venue	Opponent	Score	Result	Competition	Ref.
1	2 July 1987	Estadio Monumental, Buenos Aires, Argentina	Ecuador	1–0	3–0	1987 Copa América	
2	11 July 1987	Estadio Monumental, Buenos Aires, Argentina	Colombia	1–2	1–2	1987 Copa América	
3	12 October 1988	Ramón Sánchez-Pizjuán Stadium, Seville, Spain	Spain	1–1	1–1	Friendly	
4	2 July 1989	Estádio Serra Dourada, Goiânia, Brazil	Chile	1–0	1–0	1989 Copa América	
5	8 July 1989	Estádio Serra Dourada, Goiânia, Brazil	Uruguay	1–0	1–0	1989 Copa América	
6	22 May 1990	Ramat Gan Stadium, Ramat Gan, Israel	Israel	2–1	2–1	Friendly	
7	24 June 1990	Stadio Delle Alpi, Turin, Italy	Brazil	1–0	1–0	1990 FIFA World Cup	
8	3 July 1990	Stadio San Paolo, Naples, Italy	Italy	1–1	1–1	1990 FIFA World Cup	
9	8 July 1991	Estadio Nacional, Santiago, Chile	Venezuela	2–0	3–0	1991 Copa América	
10	12 July 1991	Estadio Ester Roa, Concepción, Chile	Paraguay	4–1	4–1	1991 Copa América	
11	20 October 1992	King Fahd International Stadium, Riyadh, Saudi Arabia	Saudi Arabia	2–0	3–1	1992 King Fahd Cup	
12	24 February 1993	Estadio José María Minella, Mar del Plata, Argentina	Denmark	1–1	1–1	1993 Artemio Franchi Cup	
13	31 May 1994	Ramat Gan Stadium, Ramat Gan, Israel	Israel	3–0	3–0	Friendly	
14	25 June 1994	Foxboro Stadium, Foxborough, United States	Nigeria	1–1	2–1	1994 FIFA World Cup	
15	25 June 1994	Foxboro Stadium, Foxborough, United States	Nigeria	2–1	2–1	1994 FIFA World Cup	

== Honours ==
River Plate

- Primera División Argentina: 1985–86
- Copa Interamericana: 1986

Rangers

- Scottish Premier League: 2002–03
- Scottish Cup: 2001–02, 2002–03
- Scottish League Cup: 2001–02, 2002–03

Argentina

- South American Games: 1986
- Copa América: 1991
- FIFA Confederations Cup: 1992
- Artemio Franchi Cup: 1993
- Kirin Cup: 1992
- FIFA World Cup runner-up: 1990
