= Locho Loccisano =

Argentine musician and television personality (born 1994)

Lucas Mariano «Locho» Loccisano
- Born: Lucas Mariano Loccisano; 22 June 1994 (age 32); Buenos Aires, Argentina
- Other names: Locho, Locho Loccisano
- Education: University of Buenos Aires
- Occupations: musician, television personality
- Years active: Since 2018
- Known for: El hotel de los famosos, season 1
- Partner: Majo Martino (from 2022)
- Awards: Los Más Clickeados Award - Celebrities with the highest rating on the internet, 2022

Lucas Mariano Loccisano (born 22 June 1994), mostly known by his artistic name Locho or Locho Loccisano, is an Argentine singer, songwriter, guitarist, influencer and media personality.

== Personal life ==
Lucas Loccisano was born in Buenos Aires, Argentina on 22 June 1994. The nickname Locho was made by his sister and it was Lochi, but he decided to change it to Locho.

When he finished high school, he began studying law at the University of Buenos Aires, but dropped out after two years to devote himself to music. At the age of 22, he started as a street artist singing and playing the guitar.

== Television career ==
He started his television career on the thirteenth edition of the youth program Combate, finishing as a runner-up.

In 2019, he was a comedian on the Net TV television program Tenemos Wifi.

From 2021 to 2023, he was secretary on La ruleta de tus sueños, the television show of Pamela David.

In 2021, he participated on the Netflix reality show Jugando con fuego: Latino.

In 2022, he was on season 1 of the eltrece reality television show El hotel de los famosos. He stood out among the other participants, based on – according to some social-network users – being bullied by some participants on episode 78. He confessed that the unrelenting harassment has impacted him personally. That confession led to many of the reality-show participants being canceled, with many of their posts crowded with hashtag #StopBullying, in solidarity with Locho's dilemma.

On 8 July 2022, he was selected by Marcelo Tinelli to participate as a judge on the Argentine version of the reality show All Together Now. And he was confirmed on 12 July for being officially jury.

== Filmography ==
=== Reality television shows ===
| Year | Reality | Place | Notes |
|---|---|---|---|
| 2018 | Combate 13G | 2nd | Runner-up team |
| 2021 | Jugando Con Fuego: Latino | 1st | Winner |
| 2022 | El Hotel de los Famosos | 5th | 16th eliminated |
| 2022 | Canta Conmigo Ahora | | Judge |
| 2023 | El Hotel De Los Famosos season 2 | | Digital Host |
| 2023 | Bailando 2023 | | Guest contestant |
| 2023–2024 | Pasaplatos El Restaurante | 6th | 6th finalist |

=== Television programs ===
| Year | Program | Role | Channel |
|---|---|---|---|
| 2018 | La Tribuna de Guido | challenger | eltrece |
| 2019 | Tenemos Wifi | comedian | Net TV |
| 2021 | Es por Ahí | notary | América TV |
| 2022 | Es por Ahí | invited | América TV |
| 2021 | Todo puede pasar | comedian | El Nueve |
| 2021 | Tenemos Wifi | comedian | KZO Entertainment |
| 2021–2022 | La Ruleta de tus Sueños | secretary | América TV |
| 2022 | Mandá Play | invited contestant | América TV |
| 2022 | 100 Argentinos Dicen (Especial Famosos) | invited contestant | eltrece |
| 2022 | Intrusos | invited | América TV |
| 2022 | Socios Del Espectáculo | invited | eltrece |
| 2022 | Nosotros a la Mañana | invited | eltrece |
| 2022 | El Hotel De Los Famosos: El Debate | invited | eltrece |
| 2022 | Bienvenidos A Bordo | guest judge | eltrece |
| 2022 | LAM | invited | América TV |
| 2022 | Comer Para Creer | invited | El Nueve |
| 2022 | PH, podemos hablar | invited | Telefe |

=== Television ceremonies ===
- 2022 – FNM (Canal Cuatro – Jujuy)

=== Radio ===
- 2020 – Te Lo Conté (Radio Cadena Uno)

=== Musical videos ===
- 2021 – Después de las 22 (by Melina De Piano - on YouTube)

== Discography ==
=== Singles ===
| Year | Title | Genre | Album |
|---|---|---|---|
| 2018 | «Tratame suavemente» | cover | Non-album single |
| 2020 | «No Me Haces Falta» (featuring YANA & Fer Dux) | trap | Non-album single |
| 2022 | «Te conozco» / «Te Extraño, Te Olvido, Te Amo» / «Me Dediqué A Perderte» (Mix) (featuring Brian Lanzelotta) | cumbia | Non-album single |
| 2022 | «Hasta que me olvides» / «Fuego noche, Nieve de día» / «Te vi venir» (Mix) | cumbia | Non-album single |

=== Solo productions ===
- L'oro di chi by Marking

== Awards ==
| Year | Organization | Category | Result | Ref. |
|---|---|---|---|---|
| 2022 | Los Más Clickeados Awards | Celebrities with the highest rating on the internet | Won | — |
