= Desire (2017 film) =

- Theatrical release poster
- Spanish: Desearás al hombre de tu hermana
- Directed by: Diego Kaplan
- Screenplay by: Erika Halvorsen
- Story by: Alex Kahanoff
- Produced by: Fernando Sokolowicz; Diego Kaplan; Claudio Corbelli; Alex Kahanoff
- Starring: Carolina Ardohain; Mónica Antonópulos; Guilherme Winter; Juan Sorini; Andrea Frigerio
- Cinematography: Federico Cantini
- Edited by: Marcelo "Mark" Martínez
- Music by: Iván Wyszogrod
- Production companies: Aleph Media; Corbelli Producciones; Visual Problem
- Distributed by: Energía Entusiasta
- Release date: 5 October 2017 (Argentina)
- Running time: 93 minutes
- Country: Argentina
- Language: Spanish
- Box office: $416,488

Desire (Spanish: Desearás al hombre de tu hermana) is a 2017 period erotic thriller film directed by Diego Kaplan and written by Erika Halvorsen based on an idea by Alex Kahanoff. It stars Carolina "Pampita" Ardohain in her first leading role, along with Mónica Antonópulos, Guilherme Winter, Juan Sorini and Andrea Frigerio. The film is about a young woman who goes to her estranged sister's wedding to try to rekindle their relationship but after meeting the groom, she begins to fall in love with him.

== Broadcast ==
On 21 December 2017, Netflix made the video available with English, Spanish or Portuguese subtitles, but the only audio is the original Spanish soundtrack.

== Controversy ==
In 2018, Netflix received online criticism claiming that the opening scene, involving a young girl accidentally having her first orgasm, was child pornography. Director Diego Kaplan defended the scene, noting, "The girls never understood what they were doing, they were just copying what they were seeing on the screen. No adult interacted with the girls, other than the child acting coach. Everything was done under the careful surveillance of the girls’ mothers." The scene uses editing, music, and sound to convey the impression that the character is accidentally masturbating.

== See also ==
- 2017 in film
- List of erotic films of the 2010s
- Sexploitation film
- Sex comedy
