= Ivonne Guzmán =

Colombian singer-songwriter and actress (born 1984)

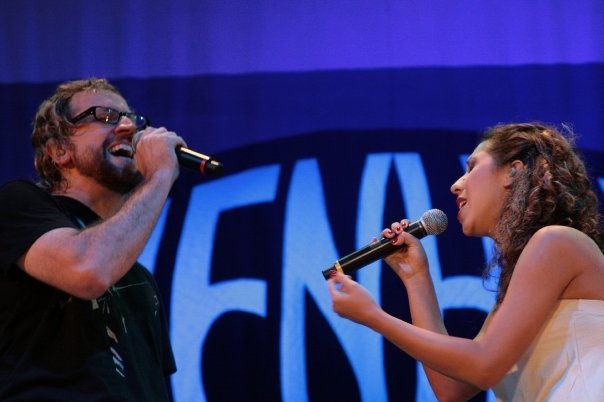
- Ivonne Guzmán singing with Thedy Correa in 2007

Background information
- Born: Ivonne Guzmán; September 10, 1984 (age 41); Bogotá, Colombia
- Genres: Pop, Fusion Pop
- Occupations: Singer-songwriter, actress
- Years active: 2001–present
- Label: Sony BMG

Ivonne Guzmán (born September 10, 1984, in Bogotá, Colombia) is a Colombian singer-songwriter and actress. She is best known for being a member of Argentine all-female band Bandana. She also acted as Inés in the Argentine version of theatre musical Hairspray.

== Discography ==
=== With Bandana ===
- See Bandana discography.

=== Solo ===
==== Albums ====
- Duendes (2008)

== Filmography ==
=== Film ===
- Vivir Intentando (2003) as Ivonne

=== Television ===
- Popstars: Argentina (2001) as herself

=== Theatre ===
- Hairspray Argentina (2007) as Inés

== Awards ==
- See Bandana awards.
