= Guido Ruggeri =

Italian engraver

Guido Ruggeri (active 1550s) was an Italian engraver and to a lesser extent a painter. He was active in his native Bologna. He was a pupil of Francesco Francia, but went with Primaticcio to work with the School of Fontainebleau.
