= Virginia da Cunha =

Argentine singer, actress, and dancer

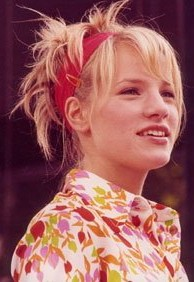

Background information
- Also known as: Virgin Pancakes
- Born: Virginia da Cunha; 15 June 1981 (age 45); Cordoba, Argentina
- Genres: Pop, dance-pop
- Occupations: Singer-songwriter, composer, actress, dancer
- Years active: 2001–present
- Label: Chicle Music Group
- Member of: Bandana
- Spouse: Federico Bruland – marr 2008-divor 2012
- Website: virginiadacunha.com

Virginia da Cunha (born 15 June 1981, in Cordoba, Argentina) is an Argentine singer, actress, and dancer; also she was a member of the Argentinian girl-group Bandana.

== Discography ==
- See Bandana discography.
- Avión (Virgin Pancakes)

== Solo ==
- TBA (2017)

=== Singles ===
Title	Year	Album
"Magnetic Love"	2017	TBA

== Filmography ==
=== Film ===
- Vivir Intentando (2003) as Virginia

=== Television ===
- Popstars: Argentina (2001) as herself
- Sin código (2004) as Luz
- Qitapenas (2013) as Paty Morris

== Awards ==
- See Bandana awards.
