= Cinzia Ruggeri =

Italian fashion designer and artist

Cinzia Ruggeri (Milan, 1 February 1942 – Milan, 6 November 2019) was an Italian designer and artist. She is known for her postmodern and surreal garments.

== Career ==
Ruggeri was born in Milan. She exhibited her work as an artist for the first time in 1960 at Galleria Prisma, age 18. Dino Buzzati wrote an introduction, praising her for her precocious talent and imagination. She then studied design at the Scuola di Arti Applicate at Castello Sforzesco in Milan and apprenticed with Carven in Paris. In the 1960s and 1970s, she served as director of design for her father's company, Unimac spa. She launched her own label, Bloom SpA, in 1977. In 1981, she established the Cinzia Ruggeri experimental line, and in 1986, the Cinzio Menswear. She taught at Milan's Nuova Accademia di Belle Arti.

== Fashion Designs ==
Ruggeri was associated with the Memphis Group. She is known for her work incorporating technology into garments.

Ruggeri's work combines fashion with sculpture, performance and architecture. Her garments use unusual materials including glass, ping pong balls, felt and cowry. She also included materials like liquid crystal, LEDs and polarised lights.

Ruggeri's 1983 dress sculpture titled Homage a Levi Strauss was presented with a light installation by Brian Eno. In 1984 she designed the costumes for the cover of Matia Bazar's album "Aristocratica".

== Exhibitions ==
Ruggeri's most recent exhibitions include "Cin Cin 1980-2015" at 10 Corso Como; "Umbratile con Brio" (2018) and "La règle du jeu?" (2019) at the Federico Vavassori Gallery in Milan. She also exhibited at Francesca Pia Gallery in Zurich and Campoli Presti in Paris. Her work was the subject of a retrospective at the Museum of Contemporary Art of Rome in 2022.
