= Candela Ruggeri =

Argentine actress (born 1992)

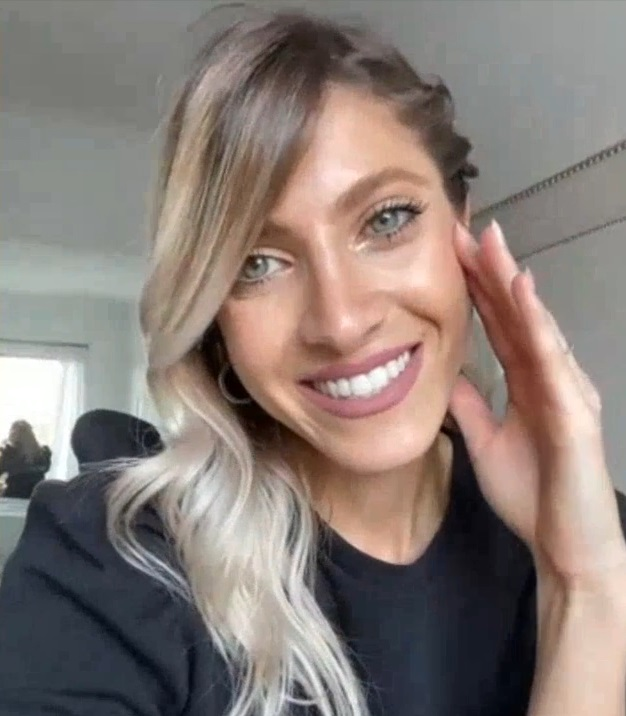
- Ruggeri in 2020
- Born: January 22, 1992 (age 34); Buenos Aires, Argentina
- Years active: from 2015
- Parent(s): Oscar Ruggeri; Nancy Otero
- Relatives: Stephan Ruggeri (brother); Daiana Ruggeri (sister)

Candela Ruggeri (born January 22, 1992) is an Argentine model, actress, reality television personality and entrepreneur.

She is best known for participating for several seasons (2015, 2016, 2021) in the reality show Dancing for a Dream.

== Personal life ==
She is the daughter of former soccer player and coach Oscar Ruggeri and Nancy Otero; she and sister of Daiana Ruggeri and the twins of Stephan and Federica Ruggeri.

She was the partner of Santiago Vázquez, brother of Nicolas Vázquez, from whom she separated after eight years on good terms.

== Media career ==
In 2015 she launched a campaign to enter the Dancing 2015 where she managed to enter, and although she did not reach the final instances, she was considered a revelation. Ruggeri was sentenced 5 times where she was always saved by the jury until she was eliminated by Ailen Bechara with her with 46.47% of the telephone vote.

In December 2015, she joins the theater play Martians in the house with Emilio Disi, Soledad "Solita" Silveyra, Pedro Alfonso, Ergün Demir, Freddy Villarreal, Gladys Florimonte, Luciano El Tirri and Lourdes Sánchez.

In 2016 she participates again in the Bailando 2016 but this time she participates together with her father, Oscar Ruggeri. The Ruggeri were sentenced 6 times, 3 times the jury saved them and 2 the public with 55.61% (eliminating Fernando Carrillo) and 51.21% (eliminating Ernestina Pais). They were finally eliminated by Charlotte Caniggia with 44.63% of the public's votes.

In 2017, she participates in the web series of Telefe, Secretarias starring Luli Torn and Mica Suárez. Candela plays Malena, a beautiful, sensual and very nice woman who appears and drives Flor crazy for all the love and attention she receives from Benja (Maxi Espindola).

In 2018, until 2019, she joins the fifth season of the program ESPN Redes, along with Gregorio Rossello, Nati Jota, Miguel Granados and Martin Reich .

In 2019 Candela traveled to Hollywood, to become the ambassador of Marvel in Argentina. She also hosted the red carpet for the Martín Fierro Awards, together with Lizardo Ponce.

In 2021 she participated again in Showmatch, this time in the academy format, where she managed to be semifinalists after being sentenced 5 times, where in one of them she was saved by the public with 57.2% vs. Nazareno Mottola. Ruggeri was left out of the final after being eliminated by Agustín Sierra with 68.3%.

In 2022, Candela works as the digital host of the reality show The Hotel of the Famous.

== Filmography ==
=== Shows and reality shows ===
Year	Qualification	Role	Grades
2015	Showmatch: Bailando 2015	Participant	14th eliminated
2016	Showmatch: Bailando 2016	Participant with Oscar Ruggeri	14th eliminated
2018–2019	ESPN Networks	Panelist	
2019	Red Carpet - Martín Fierro Awards	Digital host	
2020–present	With friends like that	Panelist	
2020–2021	Style me up	Host	
2021	Bailando 2021	Participant	3rd place
2022	El hotel de los famosos 1	Digital host	

=== Series ===
Year	Qualification	Role	Grades
2017	Secretaries	Malene	Recurring role

== Theater ==
Year	Title	Rol
2015–2016	Martians in the house	¿?
