= Oscar Ruggeri =

Argentine footballer (born 1962)

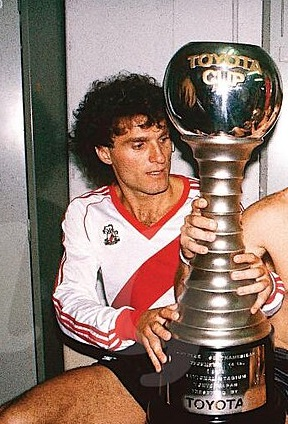
- Ruggeri with the Toyota Cup in 1986 after winning it with River Plate

Personal information
- Full name: Oscar Alfredo Ruggeri
- Date of birth: 26 January 1962 (age 64)
- Place of birth: Corral de Bustos, Argentina
- Height: 1.85 m (6 ft 1 in)
- Position: Centre-back

Youth career
- 1970–1980: Boca Juniors

Senior career*
Years	Team	Apps	(Gls)
1980–1985	Boca Juniors	147	(11)
1985–1988	River Plate	81	(4)
1988–1989	Logroñés	34	(1)
1989–1990	Real Madrid	31	(2)
1990–1992	Vélez Sarsfield	55	(5)
1992	Ancona	7	(1)
1992–1993	América	27	(4)
1993–1997	San Lorenzo	114	(12)
1997	Lanús	13	(2)
Total		517	(40)

International career
1983–1994	Argentina	97	(7)

Managerial career
- 1998–2001: San Lorenzo
- 2001–2002: Guadalajara
- 2003: Tecos UAG
- 2003: Independiente
- 2003–2004: Elche
- 2004: América
- 2006: San Lorenzo
Medal record
Men's football
Representing Argentina
FIFA World Cup
Winner	1986 Mexico
Runner-up	1990 Italy
Copa América
Winner	1991 Chile
Winner	1993 Ecuador
Third place	1989 Brazil
FIFA Confederations Cup
Winner	1992 Saudi Arabia
- * Club domestic league appearances and goals

Oscar Alfredo Ruggeri (born 26 January 1962) is an Argentine former professional footballer who played as centre-back. Nicknamed El Cabezón ("The Big-head One"), Ruggeri achieved success at the international level with the Argentina national team, being part of the teams that won the 1986 FIFA World Cup, two editions of the Copa América and the 1992 FIFA Confederations Cup. At the club level, Ruggeri's most successful stint was with Argentine club River Plate, where he won the 1986 Copa Libertadores (also the club's first title win in this tournament) the 1986 Copa Interamericana and the 1986 Intercontinental Cup. Known for his rough style of play when marking opposing players and aerial ability, Ruggeri is considered one of the all-time best defenders to come out of Argentina. Following his retirement as a player, Ruggeri turned to managing, where he held posts in Argentina, Mexico and Spain. His last job as a manager was in 2006 with Argentine club San Lorenzo. Since then, Ruggeri went on to have a career on Argentine television, as commentator on football shows. He is currently a member of 90 Minutos de Fútbol, which airs on ESPN Argentina Latin America.

== Career ==
Ruggeri started his career at Boca Juniors, playing alongside Diego Maradona, with whom he won a league title in 1981. In 1985, he moved to rivals River Plate, where he won the Copa Libertadores, the Intercontinental Cup and another league title in 1986. In 1988, he left for Europe where he played for Spanish clubs Logroñes and Real Madrid, where he won yet another league championship. He also played for Vélez Sarsfield, Ancona in Italy, América in Mexico, San Lorenzo and Lanús, where he ended his career. During his career he represented his country in three World Cups, captaining Argentina in the final two games of the 1994 competition, after Diego Maradona was expelled from the tournament. Ruggeri was also a key piece in the Argentina teams that won the trophy in 1986 and lost the final to West Germany in 1990.

After losing to Romania in the 1994 tournament, Ruggeri retired from international football, having played 97 international games, an Argentine record until it was surpassed by Diego Simeone.

With the Argentina national team he also won two consecutive Copa América titles (1991 and 1993), and the 1992 FIFA Confederations Cup.

== Personal life ==
Ruggeri's son, Stephan, is a professional footballer. Ruggeri himself appeared on the 2016 edition of Bailando por un Sueño with his daughter, Candela.

== Career statistics ==
Appearances and goals by club, season and competition
Club	Season	Apps	Goals
Boca Juniors	1980	21	2
Boca Juniors	1981	31	1
Boca Juniors	1982	43	3
Boca Juniors	1983	19	1
Boca Juniors	1984	28	1
Boca Juniors	1985	13	1
River Plate	1985–86	35	1
River Plate	1986–87	18	1
River Plate	1987–88	28	2
Logroñés	1988–89	34	1
Real Madrid	1989–90	31	2
Vélez Sarsfield	1990–91	31	1
Vélez Sarsfield	1991–92	24	4
Ancona	1992	7	1
América	1992–93	27	4
San Lorenzo	1994	22	1
San Lorenzo	1995	35	3
San Lorenzo	1996	27	5
San Lorenzo	1997	17	1
Lanús	1997	13	2

== Honours ==
Boca Juniors

- Argentine Primera División: 1981 Metropolitano

River Plate

- Argentine Primera División: 1985–86
- Copa Libertadores: 1986
- Intercontinental Cup: 1986
- Copa Interamericana: 1986

Real Madrid

- La Liga: 1989–90
- Copa del Rey runner-up: 1989–90

América

- CONCACAF Champions' Cup: 1992

San Lorenzo

- Argentine Primera División: 1995 Clausura

Argentina

- FIFA World Cup: 1986; runner-up: 1990
- Copa América: 1991, 1993
- FIFA Confederations Cup: 1992
- Kirin Cup: 1992

Individual

- South American Team of the Year: 1986, 1991
- La Liga Foreign Player of the Year: 1989
- La Liga Team of The Year: 1989
- Footballer of the Year of Argentina: 1991
- South American Footballer of the Year: 1991
- Olimpia Award: 1991
- IFFHS Argentina All Times Dream Team (Team B): 2021

Awards
Preceded by Pedro Décima	Olimpia de Oro; 1991	Succeeded by Diego Degano
