= Stephan Ruggeri =

Argentine footballer

Personal information
- Date of birth: 13 October 1996 (age 30)
- Place of birth: Buenos Aires, Argentina
- Height: 1.74 m (5 ft 9 in)
- Position: Defender

Team information
- Current team: Milwaukee Torrent
- Number: 4

Youth career
- River Plate
- Vélez Sarsfield
- Platense

Senior career*
Years	Team	Apps	(Gls)
2016–2017	Crucero del Norte	4	(0)
2017–2018	Huracán Las Heras	2	(0)
2018–2019	Los Andes	0	(0)
2019–	Milwaukee Torrent	9	(0)
- * Club domestic league appearances and goals as of 20:00, 3 November 2019 (UTC)

Stephan Ruggeri (born 13 October 1996) is an Argentine professional footballer who plays as a defender for Milwaukee Torrent.

== Career ==
Ruggeri started in Primera B Nacional with Crucero del Norte, he previously had youth spells with River Plate, Vélez Sarsfield and Platense. He made his professional debut at the end of August 2016, starting a fixture with Nueva Chicago that he departed on forty-four minutes after receiving a red card. He made further appearances against Santamarina, Flandria and Juventud Unida in the 2016–17 season, which concluded with relegation to Torneo Federal A. Ruggeri played 2017–18 in the third tier, but with Huracán Las Heras having joined in August 2017. He played twice. Los Andes of Primera B Nacional signed Ruggeri in 2018.

Ruggeri didn't feature for Los Andes, though was an unused substitute for a league fixture with Central Córdoba on 23 November 2018. In June 2019, Ruggeri switched Argentina for the United States by agreeing terms with Milwaukee Torrent of the National Premier Soccer League.

== Personal life ==
Ruggeri is the son of former footballer Oscar Ruggeri, who featured for the likes of Boca Juniors and Real Madrid as well as Argentina; with whom he won the 1986 FIFA World Cup. His sister, Candela, appeared with their father on the eleventh season of Bailando por un Sueño on eltrece in 2016.

== Career statistics ==
As of 3 November 2019.

Appearances and goals by club, season and competition
Club	Season	League			Cup		League Cup		Continental		Other		Total	
Club	Season	Division	Apps	Goals	Apps	Goals	Apps	Goals	Apps	Goals	Apps	Goals	Apps	Goals
Crucero del Norte	2016–17	Primera B Nacional	4	0	0	0	—		—		0	0	4	0
Huracán Las Heras	2017–18	Torneo Federal A	2	0	0	0	—		—		0	0	2	0
Los Andes	2018–19	Primera B Nacional	0	0	0	0	—		—		0	0	0	0
Milwaukee Torrent	2019	NPSL	9	0	0	0	—		—		0	0	9	0
Career total			15	0	0	0	—		—		0	0	15	0
