= Valeria Gastaldi =

Argentine singer

Valeria Gastaldi (born December 5, 1981) is an Argentine singer. She was also a member of the pop group Bandana.

Gastaldi was born in Buenos Aires, Argentina. She started singing early in life, and later studied in Stella Adler Studio of Acting in New York.

Her life in professional music began when she was selected through reality TV show Popstars to form an all female pop group, later to be named Bandana.

The group released three studio albums, though would dissolve in 2004. In 2007, she released a solo album through Universal Music Latino, Cuando No Estas.

Valeria started her successful solo career after the second Bandana tour, lived for a while in Mexico City and Miami, then took a break due to family circumstances during the covid pandemic. In 2022 she moved to Miami and in 2024 she signed with management company [All Parts Move].
