= Lissa Vera =

Argentine singer-songwriter, composer and actress

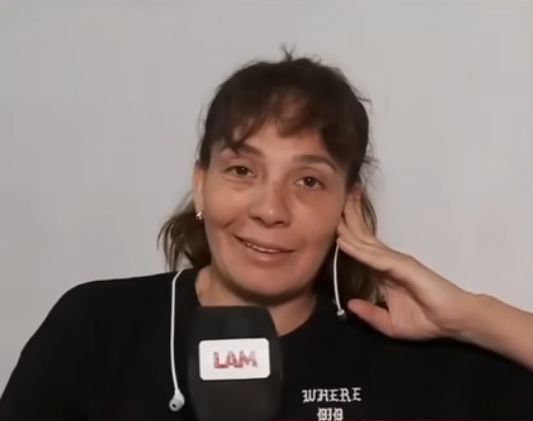
- In a 2025 interview

Background information
- Born: María Elizabeth Vera; 31 January 1982 (age 44); Buenos Aires, Argentina
- Genres: Pop, Dance-pop
- Occupations: Singer-songwriter, composer, actress
- Years active: 2001–present
- Labels: Sony BMG, Universal Music
- Member of: Bandana
- Website: Lissa Vera at MySpace

María Elizabeth Vera (born 31 January 1982, in Buenos Aires, Argentina), professionally known as Lissa Vera, is an Argentine singer-songwriter, composer and actress. She is best known for being a member of Argentine all-female band Bandana. In 2007, she participated in reality show Gran Hermano.

== Discography ==
=== With Bandana ===
- See Bandana discography.

=== Solo ===
==== Albums ====
- ¿Quién dijo? (2005)
- TBA (2008)

==== Singles ====
- "¿Quién dijo?" (2005)
- "Ritmo en la Sangre" (2008)

== Filmography ==
=== Film ===
- Vivir Intentando (2003) as Lissa

=== Television ===
Realitys shows
Year	Title	Role	Notes
2001	Popstars: Tu show está por empezar	Contestant	Winner band
2007	Gran Hermano Famosos	Contestant	3rd place
2016	Bailando 2016	Guest celebrity by Federico Bal	Round 4: Trio salsa
2020	Cantando 2020	Guest celebrity by Lizardo Ponce	Round 8: Trio rhythm
2021	Cantando 2020	Contestant replacing Gladys, la Bomba Tucumana	Round 22, 23, 24, 25 and semifinal
2021	El gran premio de la cocina: Temporada de Famosos II	Contestant	3rd place
2022	El Hotel de los Famosos	Contestant	4th place / ~~9th eliminated~~
2023	El Hotel de los Famosos: Second season	Guest Huesped	

== Awards ==
- See Bandana awards.
