= Sebastián Cobelli =

Argentine footballer

Personal information
- Full name: Sebastián Pablo Cobelli Larese
- Date of birth: January 20, 1978 (age 48)
- Place of birth: Rosario, Santa Fe, Argentina
- Height: 1.78 m (5 ft 10 in)
- Position: Striker

Senior career*
Years	Team	Apps	(Gls)
1997–2001	Newell's Old Boys	68	(15)
2001	Genoa	0	(0)
2001	Lucerne	0	(0)
2001–2002	→ Nantes (loan)	0	(0)
2002–2003	Chamois Niortais	12	(1)
2003	Chongqing Lifan	20	(6)
2003–2004	Belgrano	27	(15)
2004–2005	Huracán	25	(2)
2005–2006	Panachaiki	15	(5)
2006–2007	Deportivo Pereira	8	(4)
2007–2008	Antofagasta	32	(9)
2008	Santiago Morning	14	(4)
2008–2009	Talleres	29	(9)
2009–2010	José Gálvez	9	(3)
2010–2011	Temperley	23	(11)
2011–2012	Acassuso	35	(15)
2012	Sportivo Italiano	15	(3)
2012–2013	Juventud UU	15	(3)
2013–2014	Deportivo Armenio	3	(0)
- * Club domestic league appearances and goals as of 16 October 2017

Sebastián Pablo Cobelli Larese (born 20 January 1978 in Rosario) is an Argentine football striker.

== Career ==
Sebastián Cobelli made his debut for Newell's Old Boys on November 28, 1996, in a match against Tiro Federal in Argentina. He played 68 times for Newell's before joining Genoa of Italy.

After short stints with Chamois Niortais F.C. of France and Chongqing Lifan of China he returned to Argentina to play for 2nd division side Belgrano and then Huracán.

Between 2005 and 2008 he played in Greece for Panachaiki, Colombia for Deportivo Pereira and in Chile for Antofagasta and Santiago Morning.

In 2008, he returned to Córdoba to join Talleres.
