= Pampita =

Argentine model, TV host, actress and dancer (born 1978)

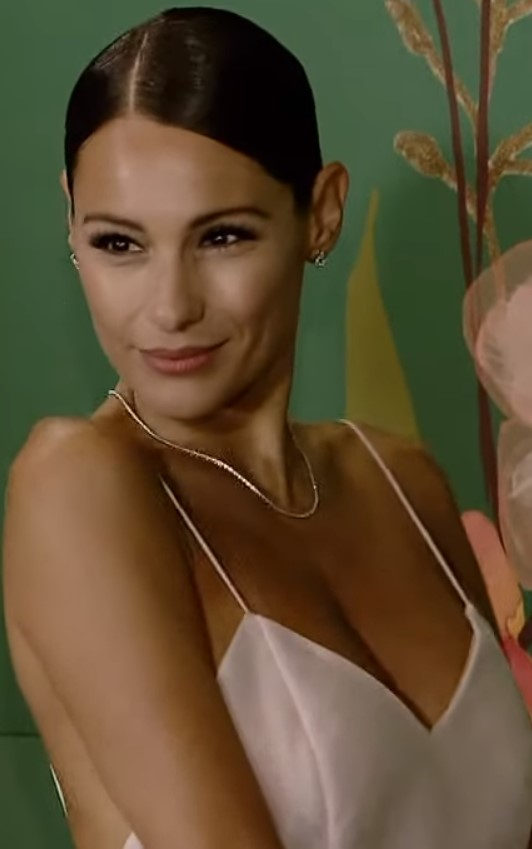
- Pampita in 2019
- Born: Ana Carolina Ardohaín Dos Santos; 17 January 1978 (age 48); General Acha, La Pampa, Argentina
- Occupations: Model, television personality, dancer, television host, actress
- Years active: 1994–present
- Spouses: Martín Barrantes (m. 2002; div. 2005); Roberto García Moritán (m. 2019; div. 2024)
- Partners: Benjamín Vicuña (2005–2015); Juan Mónaco (2016–2018)
- Children: 5
- Modeling information
- Height: 1.68 m (5 ft 6 in)
- Hair color: Brown
- Eye color: Brown
- Agency: Dotto Models

Ana Carolina Ardohaín Dos Santos (born 17 January 1978) is an Argentine model, television personality, dancer, television host and actress. She is widely known by the nickname Pampita, a diminutive for La Pampa, the province where she was born.

== Personal life ==
Carolina Ardohaín was born on 17 January 1978 in General Acha, La Pampa, Argentina; she was one of very few people baptised at the monastery of Nuestra Señora del Pilar in Recoleta, Buenos Aires. Her father is Argentine and her mother is Brazilian.

Pampita is the mother of a daughter, Blanca Vicuña Ardohaín, born in 2006 and died in 2012, and three sons. Their father is the Chilean actor Benjamín Vicuña, who was Pampita's partner from July 2005 to December 2015.

On 22 November 2019, Pampita married politician and restaurateur Roberto García Moritán; the couple has a daughter. They announced their divorce in 2024.

== Career ==
Since 2013, Carolina Ardohaín represents the car makes Citroën and Citroën DS line. In May 2016, Pampita took part in the dancing reality show Bailando 2016 as a member of the jury. From June 2017 she present the talk show Pampita Online. In March 2022, she host the program El hotel de los famosos, together with Leandro Leunis, in eltrece.

=== Acting career ===
She debuted in 2002 as actress in the first season of the Argentine telenovela juvenil (teen telenovela) Rebelde Way with the role of Lulú, the teacher of dance. In 2005 Pampita starred in the Argentine romantic telenovela Doble vida with the role of Ema, who is the first of co-protagonists. Pampita made her cinema debut in the 2009 Chilean film Súper, todo Chile adentro with the secondary role of Camila Hudson. Pampita starred in the 2015 Chilean television series Familia moderna with the role of Magdalena. In the 2017 Argentine film Desearás al hombre de tu hermana Pampita played the role of Ofelia, her first leading role.

== Filmography ==
=== As an actress ===
==== Television roles ====
Year	Title	Role	Notes
2002	(Argentina) Rebelde Way	Lulu	Main cast (season 1)
2005	(Argentina) Doble vida	Ema	Main cast
2015	(Chile) Familia moderna	Magdalena	Special guest

==== Film roles ====
Year	Title	Role	Notes
2009	Súper, todo Chile adentro	Camila Hudson	Special guest
2017	(Argentina) Desearás al hombre de tu hermana	Ofelia	Lead role
2023	(Argentina) Upcoming romantic drama	TBA	Lead role

=== As an herself ===
Realities shows

Year	Title	Role	Result	Notes
2007	(Chile) El baile en TVN	Contestant	Runner-up	
2008	(Argentina) Bailando por un sueño 2008	Contestant	Winner	
2010	(Argentina) Bailando 2010	Contestant replacing		
2011	(Argentina) Soñando por Bailar 2011	Judge replacing		1 episode
2011	(Argentina) Bailando 2011	Contestant	Withdrew	
2011	(Chile) La dieta del lagarto	Judge		12 episodes
2013	(Chile) Baila! Al ritmo de un sueño	Judge		16 episodes
2013	(Argentina) Celebrity Splash!	Judge		12 episodes
2015	(Argentina) Bailando 2015	Judge replacing		
2016	(Argentina) Bailando 2016	Judge		
2017	(Argentina) Bailando 2017	Judge		
2018	(Argentina) Bailando 2018	Judge replacing		
2019	(Argentina) Super Bailando 2019	Judge		
2021	(Argentina) La Academia	Judge		
2021–2022	(Argentina) Siendo Pampita	Cast member		20 episodes
2022–2023	(Argentina) El Hotel de los Famosos	Host		154 episodes
2023–2024	(Argentina) Bailando 2023	Judge		
2024	(Uruguay) Veo como cantas	Judge		10 episodes
