= La Nave de Marley =

- Created by: Telefe
- Presented by: Alejandro "Marley" Wiebe; Florencia Peña; Noelia Marzol; Jey Mammón; Nazareno Móttola
- Starring: Osvaldo Principi; Carla Bonfante
- Country of origin: Argentina
- No. of seasons: Spanish language: 1

Production
- Running time: 60 minutes

Original release
- Network: Telefe
- Release: 6 January – 24 April 2014

La Nave de Marley (English: Marley's ship) is a television entertainment genre which aired in Argentina by the television channel Telefe. In this program different games, sketches and experiments were performed. It was released on January 6, 2014, and ended on April 24 the same year. It was presented by Marley accompanied by Florencia Peña, Noelia Marzol, Jey Mammon and Nazareno Móttola.

== Cast ==
=== Main ===
Famous	Age	Profession	Seasons
Famous	Age	Profession	1
Marley	43	Host and television producer	Main
Florencia Peña	39	Actress, comedian and host	Main
Noelia Marzol	27	Actress, dancer and host	Main
Jey Mammón	37	Musician, comedian and actor	Main
Nazareno Móttola	31	Comedian and actor	Main
Osvaldo Principi	¿?	Announcer	Main
Carla Bonfante	¿?	Newscaster	Main

== Program sections ==
- Machine Cloner: was used in the first program. First Noelia income and on the other side appeared Jey dress like her; later he entered Marley and the other side Nazareno appeared dressed like Marley.
- Games Ship: Every day new games are made.
- Experiment On the ship: Like games every day new experiments are performed.
- Avenida Brazil By 1600: Segment where the Brazilian novel also issued by the chain Telefe parody. It is interpreted by the protagonists of the ship.

=== Games Ship ===
- Of Head: Here participants must perform various tests using only their heads.
- Quiet, please: In this game the participants perform tests noiselessly as the game is controlled by a VU meter.
- Who is the Clone?: In this game the participant lies face down on a stretcher and begins to massage the guest as he asks questions to guess who massaged.
- Say it With Clay: A charades but making shapes with clay.
- Giratron: Holding a giant needle participants must answer questions without falling into the water.
- In Line: Here the Implementation of the ship where users of the same participants eliminated presented in the program and show their talents used; until there is a winner.

=== Parodies ===
- Casados con Hijos
- El manosanta está cargado
- El Chavo del 8
- Sambucetti (Poné a Francella)
- La peluquería de don Mateo

== App ==
It launched an application, called La Nave de Marley, for Android and Apple devices, which was used to play live with the program from home.
