= Lopilato =

Lopilato is a surname originating from the Region of Campania in Italy most commonly found outside of Naples.

Notable people with the surname include:

- Darío Lopilato (born 1981), Argentine actor
- Luisana Lopilato (born 1987), Argentine actress and model
