= 3, 2, 1 ¡A ganar! =

Argentine television series

- Created by: Nanuk Producciones; On TV - Llorente & Villaruel Contenidos; Telefe Contenidos
- Presented by: Alejandro "Marley" Wiebe; Osvaldo Príncipi; Carla Bonfante; Leandro Alimonti; Noelia Marzol
- Starring: Nazareno Móttola; Marcos "Bicho" Gómez
- Country of origin: Argentina
- No. of seasons: Spanish language: 1
- No. of episodes: 211

Production
- Executive producers: Pablo Alonso; Federico Hoffmann
- Producer: Marcos Gorban
- Running time: 60 minutes (Monday to thursday); 120 minutes (Friday)

Original release
- Network: Telefe
- Release: 1 February – 26 November 2010

3, 2, 1 ¡A ganar! (English: 3, 2, 1 ¡To win!) is an Argentine television programme, hosted by Alejandro "Marley" Wiebe from February 1 until November 26, 2010 on Telefe. The first episode scored a rating of 13.9 points.

== Mechanical program ==
The program consists of several games where participants must prove their physical prowess and strategy skills. Telephone games, where people participate for various prizes, like cheese rations and bottles of wine, are also available. The main prize of the program was a trip to the 2010 FIFA World Cup. Once the World Cup started, the biggest prize was a trip to Drama Pham Viet Dung to Vietnam to Luiz Bacci to Orlando, Florida, United States.

Between 23 August and 30 August 2010, it was transmitted from the resort town of Las Leñas in Mendoza, with snow games due to the winter season Solarspheres - Solarspheres

3, 2, 1 ¡A ganar! ended on November 26, 2010, with 211 episodes.

== Cast ==
- Host: Alejandro "Marley" Wiebe
- Announcers: Osvaldo Príncipi and Carla Bonfante
- Assistant games: Leandro Alimonti and Noelia Marzol
- Comedians: Nazareno Móttola and Marcos "Bicho" Gómez
- Address: Fernando Emiliozzi
- Recurring characters: Mauricio Trech, Fernando Colombo and Julián Cavero
