= Noelia Marzol =

Argentine actress, dancer, hostess, gymnast, businesswoman and fashion designer

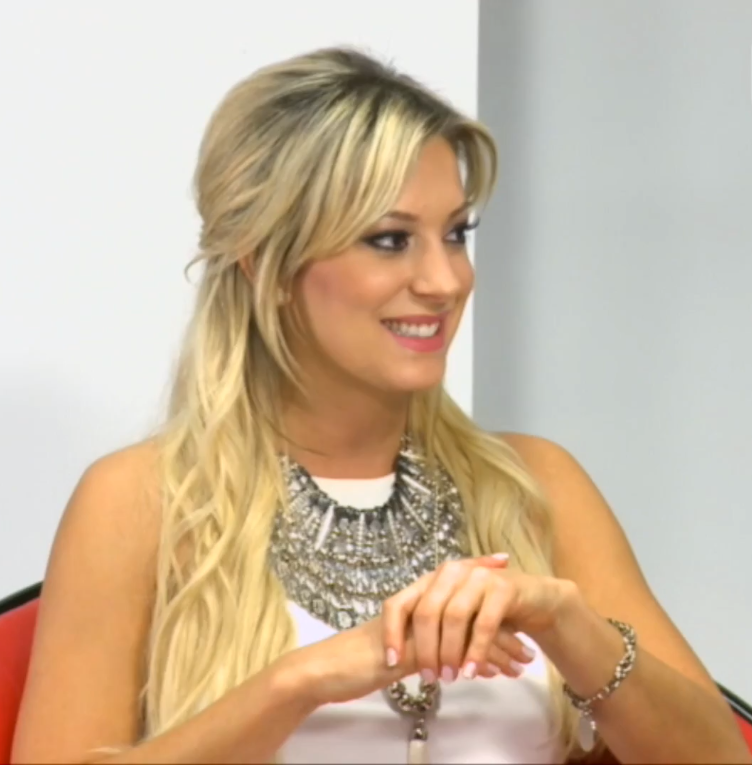
- Marzol in 2015.
- Born: December 1, 1986 (age 39); Villa del Parque, Buenos Aires, Argentina
- Occupations: Actress, dancer, hostess, gymnast, businesswoman and fashion designer
- Years active: 2007–present
- Spouse: Ramiro Arias (m. 2021)
- Children: 2

Noelia Marzol (born December 1, 1986) is an Argentine actress, dancer, hostess, gymnast, businesswoman and fashion designer. She rose to fame on the program 3, 2, 1 ¡A ganar!, where she was the secretary of Marley, and was in the program Minuto para Ganar. She also participated in numerous photo shoots for major magazines.

Noelia was co-hostess of the technology program Hiperconectados, along with Guillermo "Fierita" Catalano. In 2013, she was a finalist of the reality show Celebrity Splash. She had her own web dance program called Un Ocho.

In 2014, she made a special appearance in the telenovela Sres. Papis as Daniela. She was also on the program La Nave de Marley where they performed sketches, experiments and games.

She returned to the theater with Más respeto, que soy tu madre 2, with Antonio Gasalla. She was part of the panel of the program Infama for two months of 2015 and was one of the contestants on Bailando por un sueño 2015.

== Early life ==
Noelia Marzol was born in Villa del Parque, Buenos Aires on December 1, 1986, but part of her upbringing was in the locality of Iriarte. Noelia is the daughter of Oscar Marzol and Inés Yonni. She has a brother, Sebastian Marzol, two years her senior. She studied at the school Schiller Schule and received the gold in the fifth year for the best average of the institution.

She trained in gymnastics from 4 years, reaching national awards in competitions. In dance jazz was formed by Gustavo Sajac and Marcela Cricket. She worked as an acrobat and danced in a circus for years in various shows. She was part of the Musical Theatre Company IUNA (Instituto Universitario Nacional del Arte), directed by Ricky Pashkus. There she joined the shows Esgarabal of Ricky Pashkus, El servicio se encuentra bloqueado of Marcela Cricket, released in 2007 and Con mi letra from Mecha Fernández released in 2008, all in the Centro Cultural Borges.

== Career ==
In 2008, Marzol participated with Sebastián Wainraich in several sketches of "Kitsch", the humorous segment in the program Duro de Domar. She also participated as a dancer in the cast of La Rotativa del Maipo with Jorge Lanata in Maipo Theatre under the direction of Ricky Pashkus. In an interview, Marzol said she worked as a dancer in the Carmen Barbieri's troupe Fantástica.

In 2009, she joined the team Silvina Escudero on El Musical de tus Sueños for the program Marcelo Tinelli, ShowMatch winning first place in the competition. She shot a scene for the film Igualita a mí where she kissed the protagonist Adrián Suar. She also starred in the play El conejo, este mundo merece felicidad as Pechuga Love.

Marzol in 2010 was hired by Telefe, through an audition to be the secretary of Marley alongside Leandro Aldimonti on the program 3, 2, 1 ¡A ganar!. The program debuted on February 1, 2010 and ended on November 26 of that year, with 211 episodes. Marzol had gained more popularity as Marley's secretary in 3, 2, 1 ¡A ganar!. In 2011 she was again hired to be the secretary of Marley on Minuto para Ganar. The program had three seasons, airing from 2011 to 2013.

She also participated in Hiperconectados, a program about Argentinian digital culture, in 2011, along with Guillermo "Fierita" Catalano and Tomas Balmaceda Huarte. The program had two seasons and lasted until January 2012. In 2011, Noelia starred in the music hall Carrousel with Nazarene Vélez, Dominique Pestaña and Carolina Oltra. The play premiered on September 15 in the Tabarís Theatre.

In 2013, Marzol participated in the reality program Celebrity Splash and was one of the most prominent participants in the competition. Noelia reached the final and was fifth in the competition. In August 2013, Noelia started a new project called Un Ocho, which consists of a series of online dance tutorials for children. Noelia came to this project after much urging from the producers of Telefe.

On January 6, 2014, Marzol again reprised the role of secretary in the new program La Nave de Marley, but this time she had more participation than in previous programs. She also participated in some chapters of Sres. Papis where she played Daniela, a love interest of "Chori", played by Luciano Castro. Marzol was hired by Antonio Gasalla to make her debut on stage in the work Más respeto, que soy tu madre 2 where she played the role of Sofía Bertotti, the daughter of the character Gasalla. The work premiered on January 16, 2015 in the Cervantes Theatre.

Noelia is also part of the staff of the program Infama, which is transmitted by América TV. The program is led by Rodrigo Lussich. Marzol participated in the program Zapping as a guest panelist on February 9, 2015. On March 13, 2015, after two months of work on Infama, Noelia left the program because of her commitment with Más respeto, que soy tu madre 2 and having been called to the 2015 edition of Bailando por un sueño. Both occupations precluded her continuation in the program.

On March 24, 2015, it was officially confirmed on the program Este es el show that Marzol will be one of the new figures on Bailando por un sueño 2015 next to Luciano the Tirri, who will be her dance partner in the contest. On April 5, 2015, Diario Popular reported that Marzol was confirmed to film a movie called Locos sueltos en el ZOO. The film is co-produced by The Walt Disney Company Argentina and Argentina Sono Film. The shooting of the film began in early April at the Zoo of Buenos Aires. Its release date in Argentina was July 9, 2015.

== Filmography ==
=== Films ===
Year	Title	Role	Notes
2010	Igualita a mí	Uma	Film debut
2015	Locos sueltos en el ZOO	Noelia	Secondary role

=== Television ===
==== Realities shows ====
Year	Title	Role	Note
2009	El Musical de tus Sueños	Member of team Silvina Escudero	Winner team
2013	Celebrity Splash	Contestant	5th place
2015	Bailando 2015	Contestant with El Tirri	4th eliminated
2017	Bailando 2017	Contestant with José María Muscari	6th eliminated
2019	Bailando 2019	Contestant with El Polaco	12th eliminated
2021	La academia	Contestant replacement	Round 9
2021	La academia	Contestant	Winner
2023	Bailando 2023	Guest contestant	Round 5
2023	Bailando 2023	Contestant	Runner-up

==== Programs ====
Year	Title	Role	Note
2008	Duro de domar	Various	Segment:"Kitsch TV"
2010	3, 2, 1 ¡A ganar!	Secretary	
2011-2013	Minuto para Ganar	Secretary	
2012	Hiperconectados	Co-hostess	
2014	La Nave de Marley	Co-hostess	
2014	Sres. Papis	Daniela	Recurring role
2015	Infama de Verano	Panelist	
2016	Polémica en el bar	The waitress Noelia	Main role (season 1)
2016	La peluquería de don Mateo	Dr. Vicky Catarsis	2 episodes
2016	Loco por vos	Herself	"El hombre que saluda" (Season 1, Episode 10)
2017-2018	Qué mañana!	Panelist	
2018	Periodismo para todos	Noelia	Segment: "Summer of '98" (1 episode)
2018	Cien días para enamorarse	Vanesa Perla	Guest star
2018	Somos bien argentino	Hostess	

== Theater ==
Year	Title	Role	Note
2007	Esgarabal	Dancer	Theater debut
2007	El servicio se encuentra bloqueado	Dancer	Minor role
2007	Miniaturas Para 15 En 15	Dancer	Minor role
2007	Sabor A Tutti Frutti	Dancer	Minor role
2008	Con mi letra	Dancer	Minor role
2008	La Rotativa del Maipo	Dancer	Minor role
2009	El conejo, este mundo merece felicidad	Pechuga Love	Lead role
2010	Fantástica	Dancer	Minor role
2011	Carrousel	Skating	Lead role
2015-2016	Más respeto, que soy tu madre 2	Sofía Bertotti	Lead role
2016	Mr. Amor, casi casi un galán	Sofía	Lead role
2016–2017	Los Corruptelli	Alexia Corruptelli	Lead role
2017-2019	Bien argentino	Herself/First dancer	Lead role

== Awards and nominations ==
Year	Organization	Category	Nominated work	Result
2013	Notirey Awards	Best Outstanding Talent	Celebrity Splash	Nominated
2015	Notirey Awards	Best Female Revelation in Theater	Más respeto, que soy tu madre 2	Nominated
2016	Para Cosas Buenas Awards	Special Award	Herself	Won
2017	VOS Awards	The Summer Girl	Los Corruptelli	Nominated
2017	Carlos Awards	Best Supporting Actress	Los Corruptelli	Nominated
2017	Carlos Awards	Best Female Revelation of the Season	Los Corruptelli	Nominated
2017	Estrella of Concert Awards	Best Supporting Actress	Los Corruptelli	Won
2018	VOS Awards	Best Dancer	Bien argentino, la evolución	Nominated
2018	VOS Awards	Best Perfect Moment	Bien argentino, la evolución	Won
2018	Carlos Awards	Best Dancer	Bien argentino, la evolución	Nominated
2018	Estrella of Concert Awards	Best Dancer	Bien argentino, la evolución	Won
2019	Notirey Awards	Best Female Revelation in Musical or Performance	Sex, viví tu experiencia	Won
2020	Los Más Clickeados Awards	Most Rated Celebrities of the Year	Herself	Won

== See also ==
- Marley
