= Minuto para Ganar =

- Created by: Derek Banner
- Presented by: Alejandro "Marley" Wiebe; Noelia Marzol (2011-2013, 2019, 2021); Nazareno Móttola (2021); Lizy Tagliani (2021); Victoria Xipolitakis (2021); Florencia Peña (2021)
- Starring: Carla Bonfante
- Country of origin: Argentina
- No. of seasons: Spanish language: 3

Production
- Running time: 60 minutes
- Production company: Endemol Shine Group

Original release
- Network: Telefe
- Release: 17 July 2011 – 11 April 2021

Minuto para Ganar (English:Minute to Win It) is a program of entertainment Argentine winner Martín Fierro Awards, hosted by Alejandro "Marley" Wiebe, which began on July 17, 2011 and ended on April 11, 2021 by Telefe.

It is the local adaptation of the hit American show Minute to Win It. The program received positive reviews and had good numbers by the audience and managed to be renewed for three seasons.

== Program format ==
The participant must face ten different games, one minute each. You will have three "lives" that will lose every time fails to make the game in the allotted time. Also, you can not go to the next game without accomplish in 60 seconds. Typically losing a life the participant is taken by the driver to a secluded corner below the screen instructions to try to recover.

The "safe places" are stages of the program which, once passed, ensure the participant the amount of money obtained so far, that is, if the participant lost the game No. 6, for example, as has already exceeded the game No. 5, which is considered a safe place, will withdraw from the program having obtained $25,000 in prize money. Each time the contestant to win a game, you can decide whether to continue or withdraw the sum of money you have accumulated so far.

The participant will receive for winning each of the games, the following amounts:

- Game 1: $1.000
- Game 2: $2.500
- Game 3: $5.000
- Game 4: $10.000
- Game 5: $25.000
- Game 6: $50.000
- Game 7: $75.000
- Game 8: $100.000
- Game 9: $500.000
- Game 10: $1.000.000

== Cast ==
- Hosted:Alejandro "Marley" Wiebe (2011-2013, 2019, 2021) Lizy Tagliani Victoria Xipolitakis Florencia Peña (Guest Stars In The Year From 2021)
- Secretary:Noelia Marzol (2011-2013, 2019) Nazareno Móttola (2021)
- Locution:Carla Bonfante
- Special guests:Nazareno Móttola, Natalia Moncalvi, Verónica Lozano and Pepe Pompín

== Specials of minute to win ==
- Special Famous
- Special Halloween
- Special Christmas

== Awards and nominations ==
Year	Award	Category	Work	Result
2011	Tato Awards	Best entertainment program	Minuto para Ganar	Nominated
2011	Martín Fierro Awards	Best entertainment program	Minuto para Ganar	Won
2011	Martín Fierro Awards	Best male host	Alejandro "Marley" Wiebe	Nominated
2012	Tato Awards	Best entertainment program	Minuto para Ganar	Nominated
2012	Tato Awards	Best male host	Alejandro "Marley" Wiebe	Won
2013	Martín Fierro Awards	Best entertainment program	Minuto para Ganar	Nominated
2013	Martín Fierro Awards	Best male host	Alejandro "Marley" Wiebe	Nominated
