= Bailando 2019 =

Fourteenth season of Bailando por un Sueño

- Season 14
- Presented by: Marcelo Tinelli

Release
- Original network: El Trece
- Original release: 30 April – 16 December 2019

Season chronology
- ← Previous; Bailando 2018 Next → Bailando 2021

Bailando 2019 is the fourteenth season of the Argentine television series Bailando por un Sueño. It began airing on 30 April 2019, on the El Trece network.

== Cast ==
=== Couples ===
On 15 April, the celebrities and professional partners were announced were officially confirmed at the press conference to present the program.

Celebrity	Professional partner or Celebrity	Status	Ref.
Felipe Colombo; Actor & singer	Stefanía Roitman; Actress, model & TV host	Eliminated 1^{st} on 21 May 2019	
Dan Breitman (Note: Sofia Pachano and Dan Breitman were dance partners, but due to problems, from the fourth round on, new couples were assigned to each one.) (Note: Dan Breitman left the competition for personal reasons, after Trio Salsa round. Although he did not debut with his new professional partner. In its place enters Nicolás Occhiato.); Actor & comedian	Florencia Paludi	Withdrew on 25 June 2019	
Yanina Screpante; Model & TV personality	Matías Payen	Eliminated 2^{nd} on 15 July 2019	
Julián Serrano (Note: Julián Serrano left the competition for personal reasons, after Greatest Hits round. His replacement is, the choreographer of the couple, Nicolás Merlín.); YouTuber, actor & singer	— (Note: His dance partner (who is also a celebrity) does not leave and continues in the competition.)	Withdrew on 26 July 2019	
Matilda Blanco; Stylist & image consultant	Maximiliano Buitrago	Eliminated 3^{rd} on 6 August 2019	
Pedro Alfonso; Actor & TV and theatre producer	Fernanda Metilli; Comedian & actress	Eliminated 4^{th} on 22 August 2019	
Hernán Piquín (Note: Hernán Piquín left the competition for personal reasons, after Music video round. His replacement is Fernando Dente.); Dancer	—	Withdrew on 3 September 2019	
Leticia Brédice; Actress	Fernando Bertona	Eliminated 5^{th} on 10 September 2019	
Cae; Singer	—	Withdrew on 12 September 2019	
Mora Godoy; Tango dancer & businesswoman	Cristian Ponce; Hernán Giménez (Week 8)	Eliminated 6^{th} on 23 September 2019	
Rodrigo Noya; Actor	Bianca Iovenitti; Vedette	Eliminated 7^{th} on 23 September 2019	
Mariela "La Chipi" Anchipi; Choreographer & dancer	Jorge Moliniers; Dancer	Eliminated 8^{th} on 4 October 2019	
Ailén Bechara; Model	José "Jitsu" Díaz	Eliminated 9^{th} on 17 October 2019	
Sofía Pachano; Actress & dancer	Nicolás Sánchez	Eliminated 10^{th} on 25 October 2019	
Griselda Siciliani; Actress	Nicolás Villalba	Withdrew on 28 October 2019	
Luciana Salazar; Model & TV host	Gonzalo Gerber	Eliminated 11^{th} on 11 November 2019	
Ezequiel "El Polaco" Cwirkaluk; Singer	Noelia Marzol; Actress & dancer	Eliminated 12^{th} on 11 November 2019	
Lola Latorre; Model	Facundo Insúa	Eliminated 13^{th} on 19 November 2019	
Sofía Morandi; Actress & Instagrammer	Nicolás Merlín	Eliminated 14^{th} on 19 November 2019	
Cinthia Fernández; Gymnast, vedette & TV personality	Martín Baclini; Businessman	Eliminated 15^{th} on 28 November 2019	
Florencia Torrente; Actress	Ignacio Saraceni	Eliminated 16^{th} on 28 November 2019	
Charlotte Caniggia; TV personality	Agustín Reyero	Eliminated 17^{th} on 3 December 2019	
Silvina Escudero; Dancer	Jonathan Lazarte	Eliminated 18^{th} on 9 December 2019	
Florencia de la V Actress & TV host	Gabriel Usandivaras; Dancer	Eliminated 19^{th} on 10 December 2019	
Fernando Dente; Actor, singer & dancer	Macarena Rinaldi; Dancer	Eliminated 20^{th} on 10 December 2019	
Federico Bal; Actor, producer & director theatre	Lourdes Sánchez; Dancer	Semi-finalists on 12 December 2019	
Karina "La Princesita" Tejeda; Singer	Emiliano Buitrago; Damián García (Weeks 1—12)	Semi-finalists on 13 December 2019	
Florencia Vigna; Actress	Facundo Mazzei; Dancer	Runners-up on 16 December 2019	
Nicolás Occhiato; TV & radio host	Florencia J. Peña	Winners on 16 December 2019	

=== Hosts and judges ===
Marcelo Tinelli return as host, while judges Marcelo Polino, Ángel de Brito and Florencia Peña returned this season. Pampita Ardohaín return to the show as a judge following a hiatus. Laura Fernández did not return this season as a judge.

The BAR (Bailando Assistant Referee) will be in this edition again. Would integrated by Anibal Pachano, Flavio Mendoza and Laura Fidalgo. Lourdes Sánchez, Mariela Anchipi and Jorge Moliniers did not return this season as members of BAR, although they did return to the show as participants. Only the judges, choreographers, the head of coach and Marcelo Tinelli can ask for the BAR. The order is made after the judges score. In gala, each member of the BAR will have the possibility of adding or subtracting a point. In the duel, the BAR can save a couple. On certain occasions, Carmen Barbieri replaces Flavio Mendoza.

== Scoring chart ==
Couple	Place	01	02	03	04	05	06	07	08	09	10	11 — Duels				12	13	14	15 — Duels			16	17	Semi-finals		Final
Couple	Place	01	02	03	04	05	06	07	08	09	10	01	02	03	04	12	13	14	01	02	03	16	17	01	02	Final
Nicolás O. & Florencia P.	1				28	22	34	23	33	25	27	2	2	4	—	29	27	11	2	7	—	23	—^{A}	—	3	3
Florencia V. & Facundo M.	2	33	29	34	33	38	36	30	37	28	39	2	3	6	—	19	34	34	5	—		38	—^{A}	3	—	1
Karina & Emiliano	3	22	23	25	32	29	17	39	30	11	25	4	—			24	27	20	4	—		30	—^{A}	—	1	
Federico & Lourdes	3	26	29	22	39	34	36	35	15	15	33	1 (Note: Lourdes Sánchez replaced by Soledad Bayona.)	0	1	4	11	27	26	5	—		28	—^{A}	1		
Fernando D. & Macarena (Note: Originally, Macarena Rinaldi danced with Hernán Piquín (weeks 1–7).)	5	25	30	34^{S}	—	28	26	43	34	24	27	0	7	—		32	38	29	5	—		36	—^{A}			
Florencia de la V & Gabriel	6	31	34	25	21	27	33	23	25	26	30	7	—			40	29	39	3	1	7	27	—^{A}			
Silvina & Jonathan	7	20	35	38	29	— (Note: In round 5, Silvina Escudero could not dance due to injury and was sent to the duel.)	28 (Note: Silvina Escudero replaced by Vanina Escudero.)	25	32	21	32	6	—			24	35	24	2	6	—	26				
Charlotte & Agustín	8	25	20	13	—	27	19	38	15	24	19	5	—			19	14	11	2	0	0					
Florencia T. & Ignacio	9	34	23	29	26	17	31	30	28	24	29	5	—			24	32	24								
Cinthia & Martín	10				35	33	34	33	15	32	32	5	—			21	10	16								
Sofía M. & Nicolás M. (Note: Originally, Sofía Morandi danced with Julián Serrano (weeks 1–5).)	11	39	20	13	31	32	31	34	38	31	20	4	—			19	26									
Lola & Facundo I.	12	25	30	32	25	32	19	22	21	35	24	0	5	—		18	26									
Ezequiel & Noelia	13				19	36	29	17	21	19	25	3	4	—		14										
Luciana & Gonzalo	14	22	19	15	21	33	27	26	22	16	25	2	4	—		11										
Griselda & Nicolás V.	15	27	29	25	26	35	12	31	37	31	28	7	—			—										
Sofía P. & Nicolás S. (Note: Originally, Sofía Pachano danced with Dan Breitman (weeks 1–3).)	16	38	20	16	34	35	31	25	33	19	34	3	3	3	3											
Ailén & Jitsu (Note: Originally, Ailén Bechara danced with Cae (weeks 4–7).)	17				20	20	21	14	10	21	20															
Mariela & Jorge	18				25	31	32	31	28	14																
Rodrigo & Bianca	19				31	35	31	22	12																	
Mora & Cristián	20	22	28	24	23	28	18	36	20																	
Leticia & Fernando B.	21	14	5	23	26	20	24	17																		
Pedro & Fernanda	22				30	13	11																			
Matilda & Maximiliano	23				21	16																				
Yanina & Matías	24				17																					
Dan & Florencia P. (Note: Originally, Dan Breitman danced with Sofía Pachano (weeks 1–3).)	25	38	20	16	—																					
Felipe & Stefanía	26	21																								
Minimum score to be saved		22	21	17	21	18	18	23	21	16	25	—				19	27	25	—			29	—			

Red numbers indicate the lowest score for each style.
Green numbers indicate the highest score for each style.
Indicates the couple sentenced.
Indicates the couple was saved by the judges or BAR.
Indicates the couple was saved by production.
Indicates the couple was saved by the public.
Indicates the couple eliminated that round.
Indicates the couple sentenced for the next duel. (Note: In round 3, the couples who were not saved in the duel were, directly, in the next telephone duel (from round 4). In round 11, the losing couples of the face-off are sentenced again.)
Indicates the couple withdrew.
Indicates the winning couple.
Indicates the runner-up couple.
Indicates the semi-finalists couples.

Notes:

- In italics, partial scores without the secret ballot.
- A: All couples are sent to duel to define the semifinalists.
- S: Sanction (sentenced)
- "—" indicates the couple(s) did not dance that round.

=== Highest and lowest scoring performances ===
The best and worst performances in each dance according to the judges' (more the BAR) 43-point scale are as follows:

Dance	Highest scored dancer(s)	Highest score	Lowest scored dancer(s)	Lowest score
Disco	Julián Serrano & Sofía Morandi	39	Leticia Brédice	14
Latin pop	Silvina Escudero	35	Leticia Brédice	5
Trio Salsa	Silvina Escudero	38	Charlotte Caniggia; Julián Serrano & Sofía Morandi	13
Cumbia	Federico Bal & Lourdes Sánchez	39	Yanina Screpante	17
Greatest Hits	Florencia Vigna & Facundo Mazzei	38	Pedro Alfonso & Fernanda Metilli	13
Cuarteto	Federico Bal & Lourdes Sánchez; Florencia Vigna & Facundo Mazzei	36	Pedro Alfonso & Fernanda Metilli	11
Music video	Hernán Piquín & Macarena Rinaldi	43	Ailén Bechara & Cae	14
Cha-cha-pop	Sofía Morandi	38	Ailén Bechara	10
Argentine rock	Lola Latorre	35	Karina Tejada	11
Merengue	Florencia Vigna & Facundo Mazzei	39	Charlotte Caniggia	19
Tributes	Florencia de la V & Gabriel Usandivaras	40	Federico Bal & Lourdes Sánchez; Luciana Salazar	11
Jive	Fernando Dente & Macarena Rinaldi	38	Cinthia Fernández & Martín Baclini	10
Folklore	Florencia de la V & Gabriel Usandivaras	39	Charlotte Caniggia; Nicolás Occhiato	11
Reggaeton	Florencia Vigna & Facundo Mazzei	38	Nicolás Occhiato	23

== Styles, scores and songs ==
=== Round 1: Disco ===
Song and scores
Date (Note: During this round, the program is broadcast only on Mondays and Tuesdays. As of the second round, it will also be broadcast on Thursdays.)	Celebrity(s)	Song	Score					Total
Date	Celebrity(s)	Song	Judges				BAR (T.)	Total
Date	Celebrity(s)	Song	ÁdB	CA	FP	MP	BAR (T.)	Total
30 April	Griselda Siciliani	"24K Magic"—Bruno Mars	4	8	8	4	+3	27
30 April	Federico Bal & Lourdes Sánchez	"On the Radio"—Jennifer Lopez	5	9	8	4	0	26
6 May	Leticia Brédice	"Believe"—Cher	2	6	6	0	0	14
6 May	Florencia de la V & Gabriel Usandivaras	"Music Inferno"—Madonna	10	7	6	5	+3	31
6 May	Felipe Colombo & Stefanía Roitman	"New Rules"—Dua Lipa	5	8	7	4	-3	21
7 May	Florencia Vigna & Facundo Mazzei	"Finesse"—Bruno Mars feat. Cardi B	9	10	9	5	—	33
7 May	Charlotte Caniggia	"Sax"—Fleur East	5	8	7	5	—	25
7 May	Silvina Escudero	"One Night Only"—from Dreamgirls	3	6	6	5	0	20
7 May	Florencia Torrente	"Uptown Funk"—Mark Ronson feat. Bruno Mars	7	10	9	5	+3	34
13 May	Hernán Piquín & Macarena Rinaldi	"Murder on the Dancefloor"—Sophie Ellis-Bextor	6	7	8	4	—	25
13 May	Mora Godoy	"Moves Like Jagger"—Maroon 5 feat. Christina Aguilera	3	8	8	4	-1	22
14 May	Karina Tejeda	"Canned Heat"—Jamiroquai	3	6	6	4	+3	22
14 May	Luciana Salazar	"Can't Stop the Feeling!"—Justin Timberlake	4	6	7	5	—	22
14 May	Julián Serrano & Sofía Morandi	"Calling All Hearts"—DJ Cassidy feat. Robin Thicke & Jessie J	10	10	10	6	+3	39
20 May	Lola Latorre	"One Kiss"—Calvin Harris & Dua Lipa	6	6	7	4	+2	25
20 May	Sofía Pachano & Dan Breitman	"Get Lucky"—Daft Punk feat. Pharrell Williams	10	10	10	5	+3	38

- Sentenced: Leticia Brédice (14), Silvina Escudero (20) and Felipe Colombo & Stefanía Roitman (21)
- Saved by the judges: Silvina Escudero
- Saved by the public: Leticia Brédice (51.22%)
- Eliminated: Felipe Colombo & Stefanía Roitman (48.78%)

=== Round 2: Latin pop ===
(Note: In this round the elimination was suspended. The two couples (on this occasion, Leticia Brédice and Luciana Salazar) who were sent to the telephone vote, were saved by the production.)

Song and scores
Date	Celebrity(s)	Song	Score					Total
Date	Celebrity(s)	Song	Judges				BAR (T.)	Total
Date	Celebrity(s)	Song	ÁdB	CA	FP	MP	BAR (T.)	Total
27 May (Note: No program will be issued, a special presentation was made for the 30 years of the program.)	Without performances.							
28 May	Florencia Vigna & Facundo Mazzei	"She Bangs"—Ricky Martin	5	10	9	5	+1	30
28 May	Charlotte Caniggia	"Con calma"—Daddy Yankee feat. Snow	3	6	7	4	—	20
28 May	Florencia de la V & Gabriel Usandivaras	"Besarte mucho"—Lali Espósito	10	8	9	5	+2	34
28 May	Sofía Pachano & Dan Breitman	"1, 2, 3"—Sofía Reyes feat. Jason Derulo & De La Ghetto	4	6	7	3	0 (Note: This couple was saved by the BAR, in the duel.)	20
30 May	Federico Bal & Lourdes Sánchez	"Calma"—Pedro Capó & Farruko	6	9	9	5	—	29
30 May	Mora Godoy	"Azukita"—Steve Aoki, Daddy Yankee, Play-N-Skillz & Elvis Crespo	5	8	9	6	0	28
30 May	Julián Serrano & Sofía Morandi	"Mi gente"—J Balvin & Willy William	5	7	8	0	0	20
30 May	Florencia Torrente	"Caliente"—Lali Espósito feat. Pabllo Vittar	5	8	8	4	-2	23
3 June	Griselda Siciliani	"Taki Taki"—DJ Snake feat. Selena Gomez, Ozuna & Cardi B	5	9	9	5	+1	29
3 June	Hernán Piquín & Macarena Rinaldi	"I Like It"—Cardi B feat. Bad Bunny & J Balvin	6	8	9	5	+1	29
3 June	Lola Latorre	"Échame la Culpa"—Luis Fonsi & Demi Lovato	7	8	10	5	—	30
4 June	Karina Tejada	"Con altura"—Rosalía, J Balvin & El Guincho	3	9	7	4	+3	26
4 June	Leticia Brédice	"Felices los 4"—Maluma	-1	3	5	-1	-1	5
4 June	Luciana Salazar	"Baila baila baila"—Ozuna	4	6	6	5	-2	19
6 June	Silvina Escudero	"El anillo"—Jennifer Lopez feat. Ozuna	7	10	9	6	+3	35

- Sentenced: Leticia Brédice (5), Luciana Salazar (19), Charlotte Caniggia (20), Sofía Pachano & Dan Breitman (20) and Julián Serrano & Sofía Morandi (20)
- Saved by the judges or BAR: Sofía Pachano & Dan Breitman, Julián Serrano & Sofía Morandi and Charlotte Caniggia
- Saved by production: Leticia Brédice and Luciana Salazar

=== Round 3: Trio Salsa ===
(Note: In this round, there was a modification in the elimination system. There will be no elimination in this round, although there will be a duel, but the judges will send two couples (of those sentenced) to the telephone duel of the next round.)

Song and scores
Date	Celebrity(s) / (Guest)	Song	Score					Total
Date	Celebrity(s) / (Guest)	Song	Jugdes				BAR (T.)	Total
Date	Celebrity(s) / (Guest)	Song	ÁdB	CA	FP	MP	BAR (T.)	Total
10 June	Federico Bal & Lourdes Sánchez / (Marcos Gómez)	"Thriller"—Michael Jackson	7	8	7	3	-3	22
10 June	Mora Godoy / (Bianca Iovenitti)	"Vente Pa' Ca"—Ricky Martin feat. Maluma	4	8	7	3	+2	24
11 June	Hernán Piquín & Macarena Rinaldi (Note: Hernán Piquín & Macarena Rinaldi did not appear on the day of the sentence, where the secret votes are known, therefore, Marcelo Tinelli, the host, decided to send them to the telephone duel as a sanction.) / (Martín Bossi)	"Conga"—Miami Sound Machine & Gloria Estefan	5	10	10	6	+3	34
11 June	Florencia Vigna & Facundo Mazzei / (Gimena Accardi)	"Oye!"—Gloria Estefan	5	10	10	6	+3	34
13 June	Florencia de la V & Gabriel Usandivaras / (Ariel Puchetta)	"Quimbara"—Jennifer Lopez	6	8	7	4	0	25
13 June	Charlotte Caniggia / (Morena Rial)	"Sin pijama"—Becky G & Natti Natasha	0	6	5	4	-2	13
13 June	Julián Serrano & Sofía Morandi / (Soledad Fandiño)	"Shape of You"—Ed Sheeran	3	5	6	2	-3	13
17 June	Griselda Siciliani / (Carmen Barbieri)	"Vivir mi vida"—Marc Anthony	3	6	8	5	+3	25
17 June	Sofía Pachano & Dan Breitman / (Ana Sans)	"Bemba colora"—Raquel Zozaya	0	6	8	-1	+3	16
18 June	Karina Tejeda / (Ezequiel Cwirkaluk)	"Despacito"—Luis Fonsi feat. Daddy Yankee	4	8	8	5	0	25
18 June	Silvina Escudero / (Vanina Escudero)	"Havana"—Camila Cabello	10	9	10	6	+3	38
18 June	Florencia Torrente / (Rodrigo Noya)	"Smooth Criminal"—Michael Jackson	6	9	9	5	—	29
20 June	Luciana Salazar / (Diego Ramos)	"Será que no me amas"—Luis Miguel	0	6	7	4	-2 (Note: This couple was saved by the BAR, in the duel.)	15
20 June	Lola Latorre / (Candela Ruggeri)	"UpTown Funk!"—Mark Ronson feat. Bruno Mars	10	8	9	5	—	32
20 June	Leticia Brédice / (Laura Esquivel)	"Cuban Pete"—from The Mask	5	6	7	5	0	23

- Sentenced: Charlotte Caniggia (13), Julián Serrano & Sofía Morandi (13), Luciana Salazar (15), Sofía Pachano & Dan Breitman (16), Hernán Piquín & Macarena Rinaldi (S)
- Saved by the judges or BAR: Sofía Pachano & Dan Breitman, Luciana Salazar and Julián Serrano & Sofía Morandi
- Sentenced for the next telephone duel: Charlotte Caniggia and Hernán Piquín & Macarena Rinaldi

=== Round 4: Cumbia ===
Song and scores
Date	Celebrity(s)	Song	Score					Total
Date	Celebrity(s)	Song	Jugdes				BAR (T.)	Total
Date	Celebrity(s)	Song	ÁdB	CA	FP	MP	BAR (T.)	Total
25 June	Florencia Vigna & Facundo Mazzei	"Nunca me faltes"—Antonio Ríos	7	10	10	5	+1	33
25 June	Lola Latorre	"22"—TINI feat. Greeicy	4	8	8	5	0	25
25 June	Mora Godoy	"No te creas tan importante"—Damas Gratis feat. Viru Kumbieron	6	7	6	4	0	23
27 June	Federico Bal & Lourdes Sánchez	"Tírate un paso"—Los Wachiturros	10	10	10	6	+3	39
27 June	Mariela Anchipi & Jorge Moliniers	"Tomate el palo"—Miss Bolivia feat. Leo García	5	8	8	4	0	25
27 June	Florencia Torrente	"El paso"—Miss Bolivia	5	8	9	4	—	26
27 June	Silvina Escudero	"La noche no es para dormir"—Mano Arriba	7	10	9	4	-1	29
1 July	Griselda Siciliani	"Me vas a extrañar"—Damas Gratis feat. Viru Kumbieron	7	7	8	4	0	26
1 July	Ezequiel Cwirkaluk & Noelia Marzol	"Márchate ahora"—Los Totora	3	7	6	0	+3	19
1 July	Karina Tejeda	"La cola"—Los Palmeras	5	9	9	6	+3	32
2 July (Note: No program will be issued, due to the broadcast of the match Brazil vs Argentina of the Copa América.)	Without performances.							
4 July	Florencia de la V & Gabriel Usandivaras	"Amor"—Los Auténticos Decadentes feat. Mon Laferte	7	5	6	3	0	21
4 July	Cinthia Fernández & Martín Baclini	"Una cerveza"—Ráfaga	8	10	9	5	+3	35
4 July	Luciana Salazar	"Corazón valiente" / "Fuiste" / "Paisaje"—Gilda	5	7	7	5	-3	21
8 July	Pedro Alfonso & Fernanda Metilli	"Bailan rochas y chetas"—Nene Malo	8	7	9	5	+1	30
8 July	Rodrigo Noya & Bianca Iovenitti	"Me voy"—Rombai	7	9	8	4	+3	31
8 July	Ailén Bechara & Cae	"Mentirosa"—Ráfaga	4	7	7	3	-1	20
9 July	Nicolás Occhiato	"Baila"—Agapornis	5	9	9	4	+1	28
9 July	Matilda Blanco	"Corazón mentiroso"—Karina "La Princesita"	3	6	7	4	+1	21
11 July	Leticia Brédice	"Hola Susana"—Susana Giménez	6	6	8	6	—	26
11 July	Yanina Screpante	"Una noche contigo"—Márama feat. Fernando Vázquez	3	6	7	6	-2	17
11 July	Julián Serrano & Sofía Morandi	"La luna y tú"—Ráfaga	7	9	10	5	—	31
11 July	Sofía Pachano	"Bien Warrior"—Miss Bolivia	5	10	10	6	+3	34
12 July	Charlotte Caniggia	They do not dance. Sent directly to the telephone duel.						
12 July	Hernán Piquín & Macarena Rinaldi	They do not dance. Sent directly to the telephone duel.						

- Sentenced: Charlotte Caniggia (—), Hernán Piquín & Macarena Rinaldi (—), Yanina Screpante (17), Ezequiel Cwirkaluk & Noelia Marzol (19) and Ailén Bechara & Cae (20)
- Saved by the judges: Ezequiel Cwirkaluk & Noelia Marzol
- Saved by the public: Hernán Piquín & Macarena Rinaldi (49.87%), Charlotte Caniggia (23.18%) and Ailén Bechara & Cae (16.10%)
- Eliminated: Yanina Screpante (10.85%)
- Withdrew: Dan Breitman

=== Round 5: Greatest Hits ===
(Note: This round is based on songs from the 1960s, 1970s, 1980s or 1990s.) (Note: The singers & actors Germán Tripel, Florencia Otero and Fernando Dente starred in an opening for this round. The songs they performed were: "Welcome to the Jungle"—Guns N' Roses, "Girls Just Want to Have Fun"—Cyndi Lauper and "Don't Stop Me Now"—Queen; respectively.)

Song and scores
Date	Celebrity(s)		Song	Score					Total
Date	Celebrity(s)		Song	Jugdes				BAR (T.)	Total
Date	Celebrity(s)		Song	ÁdB	CA	FP	MP	BAR (T.)	Total
16 July	Florencia Vigna & Facundo Mazzei		"Everybody Get Up"—Five	9	10	10	6	+3	38
16 July	Karina Tejada		"Love in an Elevator"—Aerosmith	4	8	9	5	+3	29
18 July	Griselda Siciliani		"Come Together"—The Beatles	9	8	9	6	+3	35
18 July	Lola Latorre		"Karma Chameleon"—Culture Club	10	8	9	5	—	32
18 July	Mora Godoy		"Maniac"—Michael Sembello "What a Feeling"—Irene Cara "He's A Dream"—Shandi Sinnamon	5	8	9	5	+1	28
22 July	Hernán Piquín & Macarena Rinaldi		"Love of My Life"—Queen	4	10	7	5	+2	28
22 July	Rodrigo Noya & Bianca Iovenitti		"Dancing in the Street"—David Bowie & Mick Jagger	9	10	8	5	+3	35
22 July	Florencia Torrente		"Freedom! '90"—George Michael	4	7	6	3	-3	17
23 July	Florencia de la V & Gabriel Usandivaras		"Vogue"—Madonna "Loco Mía"—Locomía "100% Pure Love"—Crystal Waters	7	6	7	5	+2	27
23 July	Charlotte Caniggia		"Sweet Child o' Mine"—Guns N' Roses	7	7	7	5	+1	27
25 July	Federico Bal & Lourdes Sánchez		"Everybody" / "The Call"—Backstreet Boys "Oops!... I Did It Again"—Britney Spears "Bye Bye Bye"—NSYNC	9	8	9	6	+2	34
25 July	Ezequiel Cwirkaluk & Noelia Marzol		"Rock and Roll All Nite"—Kiss	9	10	9	5	+3	36
25 July	Julián Serrano	Sofía Morandi	"Another One Bites the Dust"—Queen	10	10	9	5	-2	32
29 July	Pedro Alfonso & Fernanda Metilli		"Take On Me"—A-ha	3	6	7	0	-3 (Note: This couple was saved by the BAR, in the duel.)	13
29 July	Cinthia Fernández & Martín Baclini		"Matador"—Los Fabulosos Cadillacs	9	7	10	5	+2	33
29 July	Ailén Bechara & Cae		"New Sensation"—INXS "You Give Love a Bad Name"—Bon Jovi	3	7	7	3	0	20
30 July	Nicolás Occhiato		"(I Can't Get No) Satisfaction"—The Rolling Stones	3	8 (Note: Replaced by Nicole Neumann.)	8	4	-1	22
30 July	Mariela Anchipi & Jorge Moliniers		"The Final Countdown"—Europe	9	9	8	5	0	31
30 July	Matilda Blanco		"Crazy Little Thing Called Love"—Queen	0	7	7	3	-1	16
1 August	Luciana Salazar		"Proud Mary"—Tina Turner	9	8	8	6	+2	33
1 August	Leticia Brédice		"Buscando un símbolo de paz" / "Demoliendo hoteles" / "Me siento mucho mejor"—Charly García	5	6	8	4	-3	20
1 August	Silvina Escudero		"Sweet Dreams (Are Made of This)"—Eurythmics	She did not dance due to an injury.					
1 August	Sofía Pachano		"Wake Me Up Before You Go-Go"—from Glee	8	9	9	6	+3	35

- Sentenced: Silvina Escudero (—), Pedro Alfonso & Fernanda Metilli (13), Matilda Blanco (16) and Florencia Torrente (17)
- Saved by the judges or BAR: Pedro Alfonso & Fernanda Metilli and Silvina Escudero
- Saved by the public: Florencia Torrente (59.34%)
- Eliminated: Matilda Blanco (40.66%)
- Withdrew: Julián Serrano

=== Round 6: Cuarteto ===
(Note: Since round 2, the program is broadcast Mondays, Tuesdays and Thursday. As of this round, it will also be issued on Fridays.)

Song and scores
Date	Celebrity(s)	Song	Score					Total
Date	Celebrity(s)	Song	Jugdes				BAR (T.)	Total
Date	Celebrity(s)	Song	ÁdB	CA	FP	MP	BAR (T.)	Total
8 August	Cinthia Fernández & Martín Baclini	"Intento"—Ulises Bueno (Note: Live music, sung by the original artist.)	10	10	9	5	0	34
8 August	Charlotte Caniggia	"Que ironía"—Rodrigo	2	7	7	0	+3	19
9 August	Nicolás Occhiato	"Soy cordobés"—Rodrigo	7	9	10	5	+3	34
9 August	Ezequiel Cwirkaluk & Noelia Marzol	"Quiéreme"—Jean Carlos	6	9	9	5	—	29
9 August	Ailén Bechara & Cae	"Déjame llorar"—Banda XXI	4	8	7 (Note: Replaced by Maria Laura "Lolo" Rossi, the head of coaches.)	0	+2	21
12 August	Hernán Piquín & Macarena Rinaldi	"Eclipse total del amor"—Nolberto Alkala	6	10	7 (Note: Replaced by Nacha Guevara.)	5	-2	26
12 August	Griselda Siciliani	"Ahora mírame"—Ulises Bueno	5	4	6	0	-3	12
13 August	Florencia de la V & Gabriel Usandivaras	"Fuego y pasión"—Rodrigo	8	8	9	5	+3	33
13 August	Karina Tejada	"Chica sexy"—Banda XXI	4	8	7	0	-2	17
13 August	Mora Godoy	"Como le digo"—Rodrigo	4	6	6	4	-2	18
13 August	Florencia Torrente	"Ocho cuarenta"—Rodrigo	9	9	8	5	—	31
15 August	Florencia Vigna & Facundo Mazzei	"Como olvidarla"—Rodrigo (Note: Sung by Facundo Mazzei.)	9	10	9	5	+3	36
15 August	Mariela Anchipi & Jorge Moliniers	"Por lo que yo te quiero"—Rodrigo	10	9	6	5	+2	32
15 August	Lola Latorre	"Adicto a ti"—Walter Olmos	6	7	5	3	-2	19
16 August	Pedro Alfonso & Fernanda Metilli	"Olvídala"—Banda XXI	4	5	5	0	-3	11
16 August	Luciana Salazar	"Fue lo mejor del amor"—Rodrigo	8	8	4	5	+2	27
16 August	Sofía Morandi	"Amor clasificado"—Rodrigo	10	8	9	5	-1	31
19 August	Federico Bal & Lourdes Sánchez	"Ya me enteré"—La K'onga	10	9	9	5	+3	36
19 August	Leticia Brédice	"¿Quién se ha tomado todo el vino?"—La Mona Jiménez	5	7	7	4	+1	24
19 August	Vanina Escudero (Note: Replacement for Silvina Escudero.)	"Llegó tu papi"—Jean Carlos	7	8	8	5	—	28
20 August	Rodrigo Noya & Bianca Iovenitti	"Te perdiste mi amor"—La K'onga feat. Damián Córdoba	7	7	9	5	+3	31
20 August	Sofía Pachano	"Beso a beso"—La Mona Jiménez	7	8	9	5	+2	31

- Sentenced: Pedro Alfonso & Fernanda Metilli (11), Griselda Siciliani (12) and Karina Tejada (17)
- Saved by the judges: Griselda Siciliani
- Saved by the public: Karina Tejada (56.66%)
- Eliminated: Pedro Alfonso & Fernanda Metilli (43.34%)

=== Round 7: Music video ===
Song and scores
Date	Celebrity(s)		Song	Score					Total
Date	Celebrity(s)		Song	Jugdes				BAR (T.)	Total
Date	Celebrity(s)		Song	ÁdB	CA	FP	MP	BAR (T.)	Total
23 August	Nicolás Occhiato		"Finesse"—Bruno Mars feat. Cardi B	3	7	8	4	+1	23
23 August	Ezequiel Cwirkaluk & Noelia Marzol		"Swalla"—Jason Derulo feat. Nicki Minaj & Ty Dolla $ign	3	6	6	1	+1 (Note: This couple was saved by the BAR, in the duel.)	17
23 August	Florencia Torrente		"Malamente"—Rosalía	7	8	9	6	—	30
26 August	Florencia Vigna & Facundo Mazzei		"Havana"—Camila Cabello feat. Young Thug	7	8	9	4	+2	30
26 August	Mora Godoy		"El anillo"—Jennifer Lopez	10	8	9	6	+3	36
27 August	Charlotte Caniggia		"Candyman"—Christina Aguilera	9	10	10	6	+3	38
27 August	Griselda Siciliani		"Look What You Made Me Do"—Taylor Swift	8	10	10	6	-3	31
29 August	Cinthia Fernández & Martín Baclini		"Con calma"—Daddy Yankee feat. Snow	10	8	9	5	+1	33
29 August	Florencia de la V & Gabriel Usandivaras		"Medley Opening Performance (AMAs 2015) (Note: The songs performed by this couple were: "UpTown Funk!"—Mark Ronson feat. Bruno Mars; "Anaconda"—Nicki Minaj; "Can't Feel My Face"—The Weeknd; "Trap Queen"—Fetty Wap; "Hotline Bling"—Drake; "Where Are Ü Now"—Jack Ü feat. Justin Bieber, and "Bitch Better Have My Money"—Rihanna)"—Jennifer Lopez	3	6	7	6	+1	23
29 August	Ailén Bechara & Cae		"Con altura"—Rosalía & J Balvin feat. El Guincho	2	6	5	1	—	14
30 August	Karina Tejada		"Me Against the Music"—Britney Spears feat. Madonna	10	10	10	6	+3	39
30 August	Luciana Salazar		"A Little Party Never Killed Nobody"—Fergie feat. Q-Tip & GoonRock	8	7	6	5	—	26
30 August	Rodrigo Noya & Bianca Iovenitti		"Scream & Shout"—will.i.am feat. Britney Spears	5	6	8	3	—	22
30 August	Sofía Pachano		"I'm a Slave 4 U"—Britney Spears	4	6	8	4	+3	25
2 September	Federico Bal & Lourdes Sánchez		"Thinking Out Loud"—Ed Sheeran	9	9	9	5	+3	35
2 September	Leticia Brédice		"Medellín"—Madonna & Maluma	4	6	7	0	0	17
2 September	Lola Latorre		"Side to Side"—Ariana Grande feat. Nicki Minaj	8	6	6	5	-3	22
3 September	Hernán Piquín	Macarena Rinaldi	"Friend Like Me"—Ne-Yo	10	10	10	10	+3	43
3 September	Mariela Anchipi & Jorge Moliniers		"Believer"—Imagine Dragons	7	9	9	6	—	31
3 September	Vanina Escudero (Note: Replacement for Silvina Escudero.)		"La cobra"—Jimena Barón	4	7	7	5	+2	25
5 September	Sofía Morandi		"We Found Love"—Rihanna feat. Calvin Harris	9	10	9	6	0	34

- Sentenced: Ailén Bechara & Cae (14), Leticia Brédice (17), Ezequiel Cwirkaluk & Noelia Marzol (17), Rodrigo Noya & Bianca Iovenitti (22) and Lola Latorre (22)
- Saved by the judges or BAR: Lola Latorre, Rodrigo Noya & Bianca Iovenitti and Ezequiel Cwirkaluk & Noelia Marzol
- Saved by the public: Ailén Bechara & Cae (60.83%)
- Eliminated: Leticia Brédice (39.17%)
- Withdrew: Hernán Piquín

=== Round 8: Cha-cha-pop ===
(Note: This round has double elimination.)

Song and scores
Date	Celebrity(s)	Song	Score					Total
Date	Celebrity(s)	Song	Jugdes				BAR (T.)	Total
Date	Celebrity(s)	Song	ÁdB	CA	FP	MP	BAR (T.)	Total
9 September	Florencia Vigna & Facundo Mazzei	"Sucker"—Jonas Brothers	10	8	10	6	+3	37
9 September	Mora Godoy	"S&M"—Rihanna feat. Britney Spears	5	5	6	4	—	20
10 September	Karina Tejada	"Señorita"—Shawn Mendes & Camila Cabello	7	6	9	6	+2	30
10 September	Ezequiel Cwirkaluk & Noelia Marzol	"Let's Get Loud"—Jennifer Lopez	4	6	9	1	+1	21
10 September	Silvina Escudero	"Bailar"—Deorro feat. Elvis Crespo	8	9	9	6	—	32
12 September	Griselda Siciliani	"Fireball"—Pitbull feat. John Ryan	7	10	10	7	+3	37
12 September	Rodrigo Noya & Bianca Iovenitti	"Everybody"—Martin Solveig	3	5	6	0	-2	12
12 September	Mariela Anchipi & Jorge Moliniers	"I Like It"—Cardi B, Bad Bunny & J Balvin	8	7	8	5	—	28
13 September	Charlotte Caniggia	"Bang Bang"—Jessie J, Ariana Grande & Nicki Minaj	4	4	7	0	0	15
13 September	Sofía Morandi	"Boom, Boom"—Chayanne	9	10	10	6	+3	38
13 September	Sofía Pachano	"Feel It Still"—Portugal. The Man	8	8	9	6	+2	33
16 September	Federico Bal & Lourdes Sánchez	"Electricity"—Silk City & Dua Lipa feat. Diplo and Mark Ronson	5	4	5	1	0 (Note: This couple was saved by the BAR, in the duel.)	15
16 September	Nicolás Occhiato	"Está rico"—Marc Anthony, Will Smith & Bad Bunny	8	9	9	4	+3	33
16 September	Luciana Salazar	"Don't Stop the Music"—Rihanna	7	5	7	5	-2	22
17 September	Fernando Dente & Macarena Rinaldi	"Smooth"—Santana feat. Rob Thomas	9	9	9	5	+2	34
17 September	Cinthia Fernández & Martín Baclini	"Burnin' Up"—Jessie J feat. 2 Chainz	4	4	7	1	-1	15
17 September	Florencia de la V & Gabriel Usandivaras	"Swish Swish"—Katy Perry feat. Nicki Minaj	7	4	8	4	+2	25
19 September	Ailén Bechara	"This Is What You Came For"—Calvin Harris feat. Rihanna	3	3	6	0	-2	10
19 September	Lola Latorre	"When I Grow Up"—The Pussycat Dolls	8	4	7	0	+2	21
19 September	Florencia Torrente	"Dance with Me"—Debelah Morgan	8	7	8	5	—	28

- Sentenced: Ailén Bechara (10), Rodrigo Noya & Bianca Iovenitti (12), Charlotte Caniggia (15), Federico Bal & Lourdes Sánchez (15), Cinthia Fernández & Martín Baclini (15) and Mora Godoy (20)
- Saved by the judges or BAR: Federico Bal & Lourdes Sánchez, Cinthia Fernández & Martín Baclini and Ailén Bechara
- Saved by the public: Charlotte Caniggia (47.21%)
- Eliminated: Mora Godoy (23.78%) and Rodrigo Noya & Bianca Iovenitti (29.01%)
- Withdrew: Cae

=== Round 9: Argentine rock ===
Song and scores
Date	Celebrity(s)	Song	Score					Total
Date	Celebrity(s)	Song	Jugdes				BAR (T.)	Total
Date	Celebrity(s)	Song	ÁdB	CA	FP	MP	BAR (T.)	Total
24 September	Nicolás Occhiato	"Loco un poco"—Turf	4	8	8	3	+2	25
24 September	Griselda Siciliani	"Yo vengo a ofrecer mi corazón"—Fito Páez	5	8	10	5	+3	31
24 September	Mariela Anchipi & Jorge Moliniers	"Vencedores vencidos"—Patricio Rey y sus Redonditos de Ricota (Note: In the duel, the performed song was "De música ligera"—Soda Stereo.)	3	5	5	2	—	15(-1) (Note: Marcelo Tinelli, the host, decided subtract a point for considering that the song is not part of the great hits of national rock.)= 14
26 September	Florencia Vigna & Facundo Mazzei	"Desconfío"—Celeste Carballo	5	8	9	3	+3	28
26 September	Sofía Morandi	"Solo quiero rock & roll"—Patricia Sosa	6	9	9	5	+2	31
26 September	Lola Latorre	"Ciudad mágica"—Tan Biónica	8	10	9	5	+3	35
27 September	Fernando Dente & Macarena Rinaldi	"Yo te diré" / "Me gustas tanto" / "Don"—Miranda!	4	9	9	4	-1	25(-1)= 24
27 September	Ezequiel Cwirkaluk & Noelia Marzol	"Ji ji ji"—Patricio Rey y sus Redonditos de Ricota	4	6	6	5	-2	19
27 September	Luciana Salazar	"Persiana americana"—Soda Stereo	2	6	6	3	-1	16
30 September	Federico Bal & Lourdes Sánchez	"La bifurcada"—Memphis La Blusera	4	6	7	0	-2	15
30 September	Karina Tejada	"Mi perro dinamita"—Patricio Rey y sus Redonditos de Ricota	0	6	6	0	-1	11
30 September	Florencia de la V & Gabriel Usandivaras	"La argentinidad al palo"—Bersuit Vergarabat	5	8	8	5	—	26
1 October	Cinthia Fernández & Martín Baclini	"No me arrepiento de este amor"—Attaque 77	6	10	9	5	+2	32
1 October	Ailén Bechara	"Un poco de amor francés"—Patricio Rey y sus Redonditos de Ricota	2	6	8	3	+2	21
1 October	Florencia Torrente	"Fue amor"—Fabiana Cantilo	3	6	9	4	+2	24
1 October	Silvina Escudero	"Mi enfermedad"—Fabiana Cantilo	3	7	8	4	-1	21
3 October	Charlotte Caniggia	"Mariposa tecknicolor"—Fito Páez	5	7	8	5	-1	24
3 October	Sofía Pachano	"Rock and roll y fiebre"—Pappo	3	9	7	0	+1	20(-1)=19

- Sentenced: Karina Tejada (11), Mariela Anchipi & Jorge Moliniers (14) and Federico Bal & Lourdes Sánchez (15)
- Saved by the judges: Federico Bal & Lourdes Sánchez
- Saved by the public: Karina Tejada (77.10%)
- Eliminated: Mariela Anchipi & Jorge Moliniers (22.90%)

=== Round 10: Merengue ===
Song and scores
Date	Celebrity(s)	Song	Score					Total
Date	Celebrity(s)	Song	Jugdes				BAR (T.)	Total
Date	Celebrity(s)	Song	ÁdB	CA	FP	MP	BAR (T.)	Total
7 October	Griselda Siciliani	"Esa chica tiene swing"—Banda XXI	5	9	9	5	0	28
7 October	Florencia Vigna & Facundo Mazzei	"Moviendo las caderas"—Oro Solido	10	10	10	6	+3	39
7 October	Sofía Morandi	"Este ritmo se baila así (Sye Bwa)"—Chayanne	3	8	7	2	— (Note: This couple was saved by the BAR, in the duel.)	20
8 October	Fernando Dente & Macarena Rinaldi	"A pedir su mano"—Juan Luis Guerra	5	9	8	4	+1	27
8 October	Nicolás Occhiato	"Es mentiroso"—Olga Tañón	4	9	9	4	+1	27
8 October	Ailén Bechara	"Tu cintura"—Banda XXI	3	7	6	3	+1	20
10 October	Ezequiel Cwirkaluk & Noelia Marzol	"El mismo calor"—Banda XXI	4	8	9	5	-1	25
10 October	Florencia de la V & Gabriel Usandivaras	"La morena"—Oro Solido	4	9	8	6	+3	30
10 October	Luciana Salazar	"Fría como el viento"—La K'onga	4	7	7	6	+1	25
11 October	Cinthia Fernández & Martín Baclini	"Rompecintura"—Los Hermanos Rosario	8	8	9	5	+2	32
11 October	Charlotte Caniggia	"Mi niña bonita"—La K'onga	2	6	7	4	0	19
11 October	Florencia Torrente	"Abusadora"—Oro Solido	6	9	9	4	+1	29
11 October	Lola Latorre	"Cuando me enamoro"—Banda XXI	5	8	7	3	+1	24
14 October	Federico Bal & Lourdes Sánchez	"La bilirrubina"—Juan Luis Guerra	6	10	9	5	+3	33
14 October	Silvina Escudero	"Wepa"—Gloria Estefan	6	9	9	5	+3	32
15 October	Karina Tejada	"La mordidita"—Ricky Martin feat. Yotuel	4	7	9	5	0	25
15 October	Sofía Pachano	"La cosquillita"—Juan Luis Guerra	5	10	10	6	+3	34

- Sentenced: Charlotte Caniggia (19), Sofía Morandi (20), Ailén Bechara (20) and Lola Latorre (24)
- Saved by the judges or BAR: Sofía Morandi and Lola Latorre
- Saved by the public: Charlotte Caniggia (50.79%)
- Eliminated: Ailén Bechara (49.21%)

=== Round 11: Duels ===
In this round there will be a duel against everyone. The dueling method will be: the couple with the highest average faces the couple with the lowest average (that is, the number 1 couple in the average table versus the number 16 couple); the second best average (2) faces the second worst average (15); the third best average (3) versus the third worst average (14) and so on. The judges and the members of the BAR will choose one of the two couples, the couple that gets the most votes will be saved (and will go to the next round) and the remaining couple will continue in the next face-off. Until there are two couples, where the 7 evaluators will decide which pair will advance to the next round and which pair will be eliminated.

==== Average score chart ====
This table only counts dances scored on a 43-point scale.

Rank by average	Couple	Total points	Number of dances	Average
1	Florencia V. & Facundo M.	337	10	33.7
2	Cinthia & Martín	214	7	30.5
3	Sofía M. & Nicolás M.	289	10	28.9
4	Sofía P. & Nicolás S.	285	10	28.5
5	Federico & Lourdes	284	10	28.4
6	Griselda & Nicolás V.	281	10	28.1
7	Florencia de la V & Gabriel	275	10	27.5
8	Nicolás O. & Florencia J.	192	7	27.4
9	Florencia T. & Ignacio	271	10	27.1
10	Fernando D. & Macarena	271	10	27.1
11	Lola & Facundo I.	265	10	26.5
12	Silvina & Jonathan	260	10	26.0
13	Karina & Damián	253	10	25.3
14	Ezequiel & Noelia	166	7	23.7
15	Luciana & Gonzalo	226	10	22.6
16	Charlotte & Agustín	200	10	20.0

==== Duels ====
Top 16 — Free Style
Face-off 1
Florencia Vigna & Facundo Mazzei	2
Charlotte Caniggia	5
Face-off 2
Sofía Morandi	4
Ezequiel Cwirkaluk & Noelia Marzol	3
Face-off 5
Federico Bal & Soledad Bayona	1
Silvina Escudero	6
Face-off 6
Florencia de la V & Gabriel Usandivaras	7
Fernando Dente & Macarena Rinaldi	0
Face-off 3
Cinthia Fernández & Martín Baclini	5
Luciana Salazar	2
Face-off 4
Sofía Pachano	3
Karina Tejada	4
Face-off 7
Griselda Siciliani	7
Lola Latorre	0
Face-off 8
Nicolás Occhiato	2
Florencia Torrente	5

Bottom 8 — Cuarteto
Face-off 9
Florencia Vigna & Facundo Mazzei	3
Ezequiel Cwirkaluk & Noelia Marzol	4
Face-off 11
Federico Bal & Soledad Bayona	0
Fernando Dente & Macarena Rinaldi	7
Face-off 10
Luciana Salazar	4
Sofía Pachano	3
Face-off 12
Lola Latorre	5
Nicolás Occhiato	2

Bottom 4 — Cha-cha-pop
Face-off 13
Florencia Vigna & Facundo Mazzei	6
Federico Bal & Soledad Bayona	1
Face-off 14
Sofía Pachano	3
Nicolás Occhiato	4

Bottom 2 — Cumbia
Face-off 15
Federico Bal & Soledad Bayona	4
Sofía Pachano	3

Key
Eliminated	Saved by the judges and BAR	Sentenced for the next duel	: The point is for the couple.

==== 1^{st} Duel: Free Style ====
Song and scores
Date	#	Celebrity(s)	Genres	Song	Score					Total
Date	#	Celebrity(s)	Genres	Song	Jugdes				BAR (T.)	Total
Date	#	Celebrity(s)	Genres	Song	ÁdB	CA	FP	MP	BAR (T.)	Total
18 October	1	Florencia Vigna & Facundo Mazzei	Street pop	"Ella me levantó" / "Rompe" / "Gasolina"—Daddy Yankee	—			—	—	2
18 October	1	Charlotte Caniggia	Pole dance	"Dinero"—Jennifer Lopez feat. DJ Khaled & Cardi B		—	—		(x3)	5
21 October
21 October	2	Sofía Morandi	Hip hop	"Pump It"—The Black Eyed Peas	—				(x1)	4
21 October	2	Ezequiel Cwirkaluk & Noelia Marzol	Urban rock	"Magia veneno (Note: Ezequiel Cwirkaluk singing at the beginning of the performance.)"—Catupecu Machu		—	—	—	(x2)	3
21 October	3	Cinthia Fernández & Martín Baclini	Reggaeton	"Arrebata"—Latin Fresh "Taki Taki"—DJ Snake feat. Selena Gomez, Ozuna & Cardi B "Mi cama"—Karol G "Dame tu cosita"—El Chombo feat. Cutty Ranks "Machika"—J Balvin, Jeon & Anitta	—			—	(x3)	5
21 October	3	Luciana Salazar	Bachata	"Stand by Me"—Prince Royce		—	—		—	2
21 October	4	Sofía Pachano	Urban pop	"Toxic"—A Static Lullaby	—		—	—	(x2)	3
21 October	4	Karina Tejada	Pop	"Beautiful (Note: Sung live (in Spanish) by Karina Tejada.)" / "Fighter"—Christina Aguilera		—			(x1)	4
22 October
22 October	5	Federico Bal & Soledad Bayona (Note: Replacement for Lourdes Sánchez.)	Tango fusion	"El tango de Roxanne"—from Moulin Rouge!	—	—	—		—	1
22 October	5	Silvina Escudero	Latin fusion	"Taki Taki"—DJ Snake feat. Selena Gomez, Ozuna & Cardi B				—	(x3)	6
22 October	6	Florencia de la V & Gabriel Usandivaras	Pasodoble & Samba	"Don't Let Me Be Misunderstood"—Nina Simone "Magalenha"—Sérgio Mendes feat. Carlinhos Brown					(x3)	7
22 October	6	Fernando Dente & Macarena Rinaldi	Fusion: Jazz— Jive	"One Way or Another"—The Faim	—	—	—	—	—	0
22 October	7	Griselda Siciliani	Folklore	"Alfonsina y el mar"—Mercedes Sosa					(x3)	7
22 October	7	Lola Latorre	Street pop	"Mi gente"—J Balvin & Willy William	—	—	—	—	—	0
22 October	8	Nicolás Occhiato	Latin pop	"La bomba" / "She Bangs" / "Pégate"—Ricky Martin			—	—	—	2
22 October	8	Florencia Torrente	Jazz	"Sing, sing, sing"—Benny Goodman	—	—			(x3)	5

==== 2^{nd} Duel: Cuarteto ====
Song and scores
Date	#	Celebrity(s)	Song	Score					Total
Date	#	Celebrity(s)	Song	Jugdes				BAR (T.)	Total
Date	#	Celebrity(s)	Song	ÁdB	CA	FP	MP	BAR (T.)	Total
24 October	9	Florencia Vigna & Facundo Mazzei	"Como olvidarla"—Rodrigo (Note: Sung by Facundo Mazzei.)			—	—	(x1)	3
24 October	9	Ezequiel Cwirkaluk & Noelia Marzol	"Quiéreme"—Jean Carlos	—	—			(x2)	4
24 October	10	Sofía Pachano	"Beso a beso"—La Mona Jiménez	—		—	—	(x2)	3
24 October	10	Luciana Salazar	"Fue lo mejor del amor"—Rodrigo		—			(x1)	4
24 October	11	Federico Bal & Soledad Bayona (Note: Replacement for Lourdes Sánchez.)	"Ya me enteré"—La K'onga	—	—	—	—	—	0
24 October	11	Fernando Dente & Macarena Rinaldi	"Eclipse total del amor"—Nolberto Alkala					(x3)	7
25 October
25 October	12	Lola Latorre	"Adicto a ti"—Walter Olmos	—		—		(x3)	5
25 October	12	Nicolás Occhiato	"Soy cordobés"—Rodrigo		—		—	—	2

==== 3^{rd} Duel: Cha-cha-pop ====
Song and scores
Date	#	Celebrity(s)	Song	Score					Total
Date	#	Celebrity(s)	Song	Jugdes				BAR (T.)	Total
Date	#	Celebrity(s)	Song	ÁdB	CA	FP	MP	BAR (T.)	Total
25 October	13	Florencia Vigna & Facundo Mazzei	"Sucker"—Jonas Brothers					(x2)	6
25 October	13	Federico Bal & Soledad Bayona (Note: Replacement for Lourdes Sánchez.)	"Electricity"—Silk City & Dua Lipa feat. Diplo and Mark Ronson	—	—	—	—	(x1)	1
25 October	14	Sofía Pachano	"Feel It Still"—Portugal. The Man	—		—	—	(x2)	3
25 October	14	Nicolás Occhiato	"Está rico"—Marc Anthony, Will Smith & Bad Bunny		—			(x1)	4

==== 4^{th} Duel: Cumbia ====
Song and scores
Date	#	Celebrity(s)	Song	Score					Total
Date	#	Celebrity(s)	Song	Jugdes				BAR (T.)	Total
Date	#	Celebrity(s)	Song	ÁdB	CA	FP	MP	BAR (T.)	Total
25 October	15	Federico Bal & Soledad Bayona (Note: Replacement for Lourdes Sánchez.)	"Tírate un paso"—Los Wachiturros		—			(x1)	4
25 October	15	Sofía Pachano	"Bien Warrior"—Miss Bolivia	—		—	—	(x2)	3

=== Round 12: Tributes ===
(Note: This round has double elimination.)

Song and scores
Date	Celebrity(s)	Tribute	Song	Score					Total
Date	Celebrity(s)	Tribute	Song	Jugdes				BAR (T.)	Total
Date	Celebrity(s)	Tribute	Song	ÁdB	CA	FP	MP	BAR (T.)	Total
28 October	Karina Tejada	Gloria Estefan	"Con los años que me quedan (Note: Sung by Karina Tejada.)" / "Rhythm Is Gonna Get You" / "Conga" / "Turn the Beat Around" / "Mi tierra" / "Oye mi canto" / "Cuba libre"—Gloria Estefan	3	7	8	5	+1	24
28 October	Nicolás Occhiato	Italian; Immigrants	"Caruso" / "Il mondo"—Il Volo "El italiano"—Gian Franco Pagliaro	4	9	10	6	0	29
29 October	Charlotte Caniggia	Spice Girls	"Wannabe" / "Spice Up Your Life"—Spice Girls	4	6	7	3	-1	19
29 October	Florencia de la V & Gabriel Usandivaras	Jorge Ibáñez	"I Will Survive"—Postmodern Jukebox "La Vie en rose"—Louis Armstrong / Grace Jones	10	10	10	7	+3	40
31 October	Cinthia Fernández & Martín Baclini	Pimpinela	"Una estúpida más" / "Valiente" / "A esa" / "Olvídame y pega la vuelta"—Pimpinela	3	7	8	5	-2	21
31 October	Ezequiel Cwirkaluk & Noelia Marzol	Walter Olmos	"Adicto a ti (Note: Sung by Ezequiel Cwirkaluk.)" / "Por lo que yo te quiero"—Walter Olmos	3	6	7	0	-2	14
1 November	Florencia Vigna & Facundo Mazzei	Beyoncé	"Oye (Note: Sung by Facundo Mazzei.)" / "Crazy in Love" / "Single Ladies (Put a Ring on It)" / "Run the World (Girls)"—Beyoncé	2	5	6	3	+3	19
1 November	Luciana Salazar	Emilio Disi	"Brigada Z soundtrack" / "Bañeros 1 soundtrack"—Raúl Parentella	0	5	6	3	-3	11
4 November	Fernando Dente & Macarena Rinaldi	ABBA	"Thank You for the Music (Note: Sung by Fernando Dente.)" / "Gimme! Gimme! Gimme!" / "Dancing Queen" / "Super Trouper" / "Take a Chance on Me" / "Voulez-Vous"—ABBA	4	10	9	7	+2	32
4 November	Sofía Morandi	Thalía	"Mujer Latina" / "Amor a la mexicana" / "Equivocada" / "Tú y yo" / "¿A quién le importa?" / "Arrasando"—Thalía	3	6	8	3	-1	19
4 November	Silvina Escudero	The Beatles	"Come Together" / "Help!" / "She Loves You" / "All My Loving" / "Oh! Darling" / "Let It Be"—The Beatles	4	7	7	4	+2	24
5 November	Federico Bal & Soledad Bayona (Note: Replacement for Lourdes Sánchez.)	Elvis Presley	"Also Sprach Zarathustra" / "Jailhouse Rock" / "Hound Dog" / "Always on My Mind" / "Heartbreak Hotel" / "A Little Less Conversation"—Elvis Presley	2	6	6	0	-3	11
7 November	Florencia Torrente	Cher	"If I Could Turn Back Time" / "Welcome to Burlesque" / "The Shoop Shoop Song" / "Believe" / "Strong Enough"—Cher	2	8	9	5	0	24
7 November	Lola Latorre	Shakira	"Pies descalzos, sueños blancos" / "Ciega, sordomuda" / "Ojos así" / "Hips Don't Lie" / "Waka Waka"—Shakira	2	6	6	2	+2	18

- Sentenced: Luciana Salazar (11), Federico Bal & Soledad Bayona (11), Ezequiel Cwirkaluk & Noelia Marzol (14) and Lola Latorre (18)
- Saved by the judges: Federico Bal & Soledad Bayona
- Saved by the public: Lola Latorre (39.75%)
- Eliminated: Luciana Salazar (23.37%) and Ezequiel Cwirkaluk & Noelia Marzol (36.88%)
- Withdrew: Griselda Siciliani

=== Round 13: Jive ===
(Note: This round has double elimination.)

Song and scores
Date	Celebrity(s)	Song	Score					Total
Date	Celebrity(s)	Song	Jugdes				BAR (T.)	Total
Date	Celebrity(s)	Song	ÁdB	CA	FP	MP	BAR (T.)	Total
11 November	Nicolás Occhiato	"Don't Stop Me Now"—Queen	5	9	9	2	+2	27
12 November	Florencia Vigna & Facundo Mazzei	"Great Balls of Fire"—Jerry Lee Lewis	10	7	10	5	+2	34
12 November	Florencia de la V & Gabriel Usandivaras	"Hit the Road Jack"—Ray Charles	5	9	10	6	-1	29
12 November	Sofía Morandi	"Hound Dog"—Elvis Presley	4	9	9	5	-1	26
14 November	Federico Bal & Soledad Bayona (Note: Replacement for Lourdes Sánchez.)	"Long Tall Sally"—Cagey Strings	5	8	8	5	+1	27
14 November	Charlotte Caniggia	"Shake It Off"—Taylor Swift	2	5	6	2	-1	14
15 November	Karina Tejada	"Travelin' Band"—Creedence Clearwater Revival	2	9	8	5	+3	27
15 November	Cinthia Fernández & Martín Baclini	"Footloose"—Kenny Loggins	0	6	5	2	-3	10
15 November	Lola Latorre	"You Can't Stop the Beat"—from Hairspray	7	6	8	5	0	26
15 November	Silvina Escudero	"Proud Mary"—Tina Turner	7	10	9	6	+3	35
18 November	Fernando Dente & Macarena Rinaldi	"Simply Irresistible"—Robert Palmer	9	10	10	6	+3	38
18 November	Florencia Torrente	"Johnny B. Goode"—Chuck Berry	6	10	8	5	+3	32

- Sentenced: Cinthia Fernández & Martín Baclini (10), Charlotte Caniggia (14), Sofía Morandi (26) and Lola Latorre (26)
- Saved by the judges and BAR: Cinthia Fernández & Martín Baclini
- Saved by the public: Charlotte Caniggia (49.38%)
- Eliminated: Lola Latorre (20.05%) and Sofía Morandi (30.57%)

=== Round 14: Folklore ===
(Note: This round has double elimination.)

Song and scores
Date	Celebrity(s)	Song	Score					Total
Date	Celebrity(s)	Song	Jugdes				BAR (T.)	Total
Date	Celebrity(s)	Song	ÁdB	CA	FP	MP	BAR (T.)	Total
21 November	Federico Bal & Lourdes Sánchez	"El beso"—Abel Pintos	10	8	6	4	-2	26
21 November	Nicolás Occhiato	"Déjame que me vaya"—Chaqueño Palavecino	2	6	4	2	-3	11
22 November	Florencia Vigna & Facundo Mazzei	"Chacarera del violín"—Néstor Garnica	10	8	8	6	+2	34
22 November	Florencia de la V & Gabriel Usandivaras	"Zamba para olvidar"—Mercedes Sosa	10	9	10	7	+3	39
22 November	Silvina Escudero	"La yapa"—Los Nocheros	4	8	8	4	0	24
25 November	Karina Tejada	"La sin corazón"—Chaqueño Palavecino	4	7	6	4	-1	20
25 November	Charlotte Caniggia	"Sobredosis de chamamé"—Amboé	0	5	6	-1	+1 (Note: This couple was saved by the BAR, in the duel.)	11
26 November	Fernando Dente & Macarena Rinaldi	"Chacarera de un triste"—Soledad Pastorutti	6	7	9	5	+2	29
26 November	Cinthia Fernández & Martín Baclini	"Kilómetro 11"—Los Alonsitos	2	6	6	2	0	16
26 November	Florencia Torrente	"Al jardín de la república"—Abel Pintos	3	9	8	3	+1	24

- Sentenced: Nicolás Occhiato (11), Charlotte Caniggia (11), Cinthia Fernández & Martín Baclini (16), Karina Tejada (20), Silvina Escudero (24) and Florencia Torrente (24)
- Saved by the judges or BAR: Nicolás Occhiato, Charlotte Caniggia and Silvina Escudero
- Saved by the public: Karina Tejada (41.02%)
- Eliminated: Cinthia Fernández & Martín Baclini (24.67%) and Florencia Torrente (34.31%)

=== Round 15: Duels II ===
The elimination system is the same as the duels I. In this round there will be a duel against everyone. The dueling method (based on average) will be: The first faces the eighth, the two to the seventh, the three to the sixth and the fourth with the fifth. The judges and the members of the BAR will choose one of the two couples, the couple that gets the most votes will be saved (and will go to the next round) and the remaining couple will continue in the next face-off. Until there are two couples, where the 7 evaluators will decide which pair will advance to the next round and which pair will be eliminated.

==== Average score chart ====
This table only counts dances scored on a 43-point scale.

Rank by average	Couple	Total points	Number of dances	Average
1	Florencia V. & Facundo M.	424	13	32.6
2	Florencia de la V & Gabriel	383	13	29.5
3	Fernando D. & Macarena	370	13	28.4
4	Federico & Lourdes	348	13	26.7
5	Silvina & Jonathan	343	13	26.3
6	Nicolás O. & Florencia J.	259	10	25.9
7	Karina & Emiliano	324	13	24.9
8	Charlotte & Agustín	244	13	18.8

==== Duels ====
Top 8 — Bachata
Face-off 1
Florencia Vigna & Facundo Mazzei	5
Charlotte Caniggia	2
Face-off 2
Fernando Dente & Macarena Rinaldi	5
Nicolás Occhiato	2
Face-off 3
Florencia de la V & Gabriel Usandivaras	3
Karina Tejada	4
Face-off 4
Federico Bal & Lourdes Sánchez	5
Silvina Escudero	2

Bottom 4 — Merengue
Face-off 5
Charlotte Caniggia	0
Nicolás Occhiato	7
Face-off 6
Florencia de la V & Gabriel Usandivaras	1
Silvina Escudero	6

Bottom 2 — Greatest Hits
Face-off 7
Charlotte Caniggia	0
Florencia de la V & Gabriel Usandivaras	7

Key
Eliminated	Saved by the judges and BAR	Sentenced for the next duel	: The point is for the couple.

==== 1^{st} Duel: Bachata ====
Song and scores
Date	#	Celebrity(s)	Song	Score					Total
Date	#	Celebrity(s)	Song	Jugdes				BAR (T.)	Total
Date	#	Celebrity(s)	Song	ÁdB	CA	FP	MP	BAR (T.)	Total
29 November	1	Florencia Vigna & Facundo Mazzei	"It's a Mans World"—Dani J		(Note: Replaced by Griselda Siciliani.)			(x1)	5
29 November	1	Charlotte Caniggia	"Despacito"—Susan Prieto	—	—	—	—	(x2)	2
29 November	2	Fernando Dente & Macarena Rinaldi	"Stand by Me"—Prince Royce			—		(x2)	5
29 November	2	Nicolás Occhiato	"Si esta casa hablara"—Sabroso	—	—		—	(x1)	2
29 November	3	Florencia de la V & Gabriel Usandivaras	"Killing Me Softly with His Song"—Rebecca Kingsley		—	—		(x1)	3
29 November	3	Karina Tejada	"Deja Vu"—Prince Royce & Shakira	—			—	(x2)	4
2 December
2 December	4	Federico Bal & Lourdes Sánchez	"Quitémonos la ropa"—Dani J		(Note: Replaced by Nicole Neumann.)			(x1)	5
2 December	4	Silvina Escudero	"Eres mía"—Romeo Santos	—	—	—	—	(x2)	2

==== 2^{nd} Duel: Merengue ====
Song and scores
Date	#	Celebrity(s)	Song	Score					Total
Date	#	Celebrity(s)	Song	Jugdes				BAR (T.)	Total
Date	#	Celebrity(s)	Song	ÁdB	CA	FP	MP	BAR (T.)	Total
2 December	5	Charlotte Caniggia	"Mi niña bonita"—La K'onga	—	— (Note: Replaced by Nicole Neumann.)	—	—	—	0
2 December	5	Nicolás Occhiato	"Es mentiroso"—Olga Tañón					(x3)	7
2 December	6	Florencia de la V & Gabriel Usandivaras	"La morena"—Oro Solido	—	—	—	—	(x1)	1
2 December	6	Silvina Escudero	"Muévelo"—Jandy Ventura & Los Potros					(x2)	6

==== 3^{rd} Duel: Greatest Hits ====
Song and scores
Date	#	Celebrity(s)	Song	Score					Total
Date	#	Celebrity(s)	Song	Jugdes				BAR (T.)	Total
Date	#	Celebrity(s)	Song	ÁdB	CA	FP	MP	BAR (T.)	Total
3 December	7	Charlotte Caniggia	"You're the One That I Want"—John Travolta & Olivia Newton-John	—	— (Note: Replaced by Nicole Neumann.)	—	—	—	0
3 December	7	Florencia de la V & Gabriel Usandivaras	"Vogue"—Madonna "Loco Mía"—Locomía "100% Pure Love"—Crystal Waters					(x3)	7

=== Round 16: Reggaeton ===
Song and scores
Date	Celebrity(s)	Song	Score					Total
Date	Celebrity(s)	Song	Jugdes				BAR (T.)	Total
Date	Celebrity(s)	Song	ÁdB	CA	FP	MP	BAR (T.)	Total
3 December	Florencia Vigna & Facundo Mazzei	"Watch Out for This (Bumaye)"—Major Lazer feat. Daddy Yankee	10	9 (Note: Replaced by Nicole Neumann.)	10	6	+3	38
3 December	Fernando Dente & Macarena Rinaldi	"Plakito"—Yandel feat. Gadiel	7	10	10	6	+3	36
5 December	Federico Bal & Lourdes Sánchez	"Contra la pared"—Sean Paul & J Balvin	7	9	7	4	+1 (Note: This couple was saved by the BAR, in the duel.)	28
5 December	Nicolás Occhiato	"Impacto"—Daddy Yankee feat. Fergie	5	7	8	5	-2	23
5 December	Silvina Escudero	"Ginza"—J Balvin	6	9	6	4	+1	26
6 December	Karina Tejada	"Machika"—J Balvin, Jeon & Anitta	8	8	8	6	0	30
6 December	Florencia de la V & Gabriel Usandivaras	"Ritmo (Bad Boys for Life)"—The Black Eyed Peas & J Balvin	7	10	7	4	-1	27

- Sentenced: Nicolás Occhiato (23), Silvina Escudero (26), Florencia de la V & Gabriel Usandivaras (27) and Federico Bal & Lourdes Sánchez (28)
- Saved by the judges or BAR: Federico Bal & Lourdes Sánchez and Florencia de la V & Gabriel Usandivaras
- Saved by the public: Nicolás Occhiato (69.39%)
- Eliminated: Silvina Escudero (30.61%)

=== Round 17: Tributes II ===
(Note: This round has double elimination.)

Song and scores
Date	Celebrity(s)	Tribute	Song	Result
9 December	Florencia Vigna & Facundo Mazzei	People fighting cancer	"Revolt"—Nathan Lanier	Advanced to the Semi-finals
9 December	Fernando Dente & Macarena Rinaldi	Earth (Climate change)	"Sign of the Times"—Harry Styles	Eliminated
10 December	Karina Tejada	Women's empowerment	"Creo en mí"—Natalia Jiménez	Advanced to the Semi-finals
10 December	Federico Bal & Lourdes Sánchez	The struggle of the American peoples	"Plata Ta Tá"—Mon Laferte & Guaynaa "Canguro"—Wos "El derecho de vivir en paz"—Víctor Jara	Advanced to the Semi-finals
10 December	Nicolás Occhiato	Persistence and Overcome	"Respira el momento"—Calle 13	Advanced to the Semi-finals
10 December	Florencia de la V & Gabriel Usandivaras	Tita Merello	"Pipistrela" / "Mi papito" / "Nostalgias" / "Se dice de mí"—Tita Merello	Eliminated

- Saved by the judges and BAR: Federico Bal & Lourdes Sánchez, Florencia Vigna & Facundo Mazzei and Nicolás Occhiato
- Saved by the public: Karina Tejada (52.52%)
- Eliminated: Florencia de la V & Gabriel Usandivaras (17.61%) and Fernando Dente & Macarena Rinaldi (29.87%)

=== Semifinals ===
==== 1^{st} Semi-final ====
Song and scores
Date	Celebrity(s)	Style	Song	Score					Total
Date	Celebrity(s)	Style	Song	Jugdes				BAR (T.)	Total
Date	Celebrity(s)	Style	Song	ÁdB	CA	FP	MP	BAR (T.)	Total
First semifinal (December 12)	Federico Bal & Lourdes Sánchez	Cuarteto	"Ya me enteré"—La K'onga	—	—	—		—	0
First semifinal (December 12)	Florencia Vigna & Facundo Mazzei	Cuarteto	"Como olvidarla"—Rodrigo (Note: Sung by Facundo Mazzei.)				—	(x3)	1
First semifinal (December 12)	Federico Bal & Lourdes Sánchez	Free Style	"Thinking Out Loud"—Ed Sheeran					(x3)	1
First semifinal (December 12)	Florencia Vigna & Facundo Mazzei	Free Style	"Ella me levantó" / "Rompe" / "Gasolina"—Daddy Yankee	—	—	—	—	—	0

Totals
Celebrity(s)	Subtotal	Telephone vote	Total
Federico Bal & Lourdes Sánchez	1	42.27% (0)	0
Florencia Vigna & Facundo Mazzei	1	57.73% (2)	3

Notes

- : The point is for the couple.

Result

- Finalists: Florencia Vigna & Facundo Mazzei
- Semifinalists: Federico Bal & Lourdes Sánchez

==== 2^{nd} Semifinal ====
Song and scores
Date	Celebrity(s)	Style	Song	Score					Total
Date	Celebrity(s)	Style	Song	Jugdes				BAR (T.)	Total
Date	Celebrity(s)	Style	Song	ÁdB	CA	FP	MP	BAR (T.)	Total
Second semifinal (December 13)	Karina Tejada	Cumbia	"La cola"—Los Palmeras		—	—		(x2)	1
Second semifinal (December 13)	Nicolás Occhiato	Cumbia	"Baila"—Agapornis	—			—	(x1)	0
Second semifinal (December 13)	Karina Tejada	Free Style	"Beautiful (Note: Sung live (in Spanish) by Karina Tejada.)" / "Fighter"—Christina Aguilera	—	—	—	—	—	0
Second semifinal (December 13)	Nicolás Occhiato	Free Style	"La bomba" / "She Bangs" / "Pégate"—Ricky Martin					(x3)	1

Totals
Celebrity(s)	Subtotal	Telephone vote	Total
Karina Tejada	1	46.53% (0)	1
Nicolás Occhiato	1	53.47% (2)	3

Notes

- : The point is for the couple.

Result

- Finalist: Nicolás Occhiato
- Semifinalist: Karina Tejada

=== Final ===
Song and scores
Date	Celebrity(s)	Style	Song	Score					Total
Date	Celebrity(s)	Style	Song	Jugdes				BAR (T.)	Total
Date	Celebrity(s)	Style	Song	ÁdB	CA	FP	MP	BAR (T.)	Total
Final (16 December)	Florencia Vigna & Facundo Mazzei	Jive	"Great Balls of Fire"—Jerry Lee Lewis	—	—	—		(x1)	0
Final (16 December)	Nicolás Occhiato	Jive	"Don't Stop Me Now"—Queen				—	(x2)	1
Final (16 December)	Florencia Vigna & Facundo Mazzei	Cha-cha-pop	"Sucker"—Jonas Brothers	—				(x2)	1
Final (16 December)	Nicolás Occhiato	Cha-cha-pop	"Está rico"—Marc Anthony, Will Smith & Bad Bunny		—	—	—	(x1)	0

Totals
Celebrity(s)	Subtotal	Telephone vote	Total
Florencia Vigna & Facundo Mazzei	1	49.92% (0)	1
Nicolás Occhiato	1	50.08% (2)	3

Notes

- : The point is for the couple.

Result:

- Winner: Nicolás Occhiato
- Runners-up: Florencia Vigna & Facundo Mazzei
