= Florencia de la V =

Argentine actress, television personality, comedian and vedette

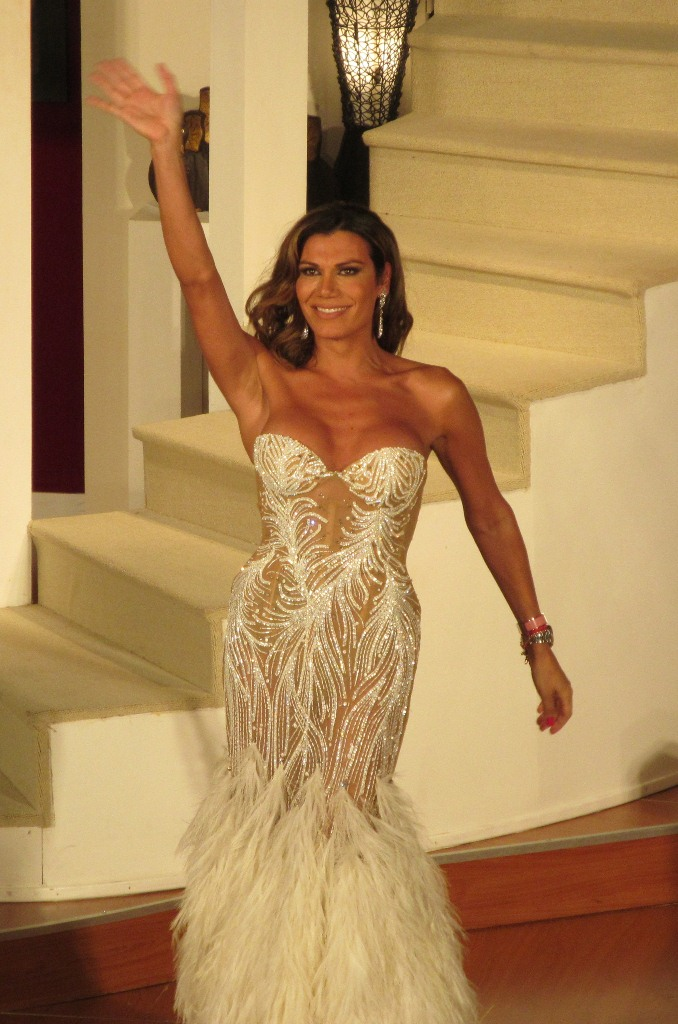
- de la V in her play ¡Que gauchita mi mucama!, January 2012
- Born: 2 March 1975 (age 51); Monte Grande, Argentina
- Occupations: Actress; television personality; comedian; vedette
- Years active: 1998–present
- Spouse: Pablo Goycochea (m. 2011)
- Children: 2

Florencia Trinidad (born 2 March 1975), known professionally as Flor de la V, is an Argentine actress, television personality, comedian and vedette. As producer Gerardo Sofovich's protégée, who discovered her in a 1998 Buenos Aires revue, De La V gained media exposure and got small television roles. Her role in the widely successful Los Roldán gave her international notoriety. Over the years, she has become a household name in Argentine show business.

In 2014, GLAAD stated that "through her advocacy and proud visibility, [she] has contributed immensely to advancing the equality movement around the world and particularly in Argentina." She became the first transgender person in Argentina to get her name and the gender on her government-issued ID legally changed without pathologizing her gender identity, two years before the national Gender Identity Law was established.

In 2021, Flor de la V announced that she identified as a travesti, writing: "I discovered a more correct way to get in touch with how I feel: neither woman, nor heterosexual, nor homosexual, nor bisexual. I am a dissident of the gender system, my political construction in this society is that of a pure-bred travesti. That what I am and what I want and choose to be."

== Biography ==
=== Early life ===
De La V was born in the city of Monte Grande, Buenos Aires Province. The family home was located in Villa Los Lirios. When De La V was two years old, her mother died, (Note: De La V has publicly stated both that her mother died from cancer and that her mother died from complications from an abortion.) and she moved to Lomas de Zamora (Province of Buenos Aires) with her father and brother.

At age 16, De La V dressed-up as a young lady to attend the sweet 16th birthday party of her best friend. From then on she became known as Karen, until she was renamed by a friend as “Florencia de la Vega”; eventually for legal reasons her name was adapted to Florencia de la V.

=== Education ===
She completed her primary and high-school in the suburbs of Lomas de Zamora, located in the southwest part of greater Buenos Aires. A fashion enthusiast since she made her first dress, she decided to follow a career in fashion design at the UNNE, the National University of the Northeast, Argentina. As Karen, she began her career producing outfits and theatrical garments for Burlesque and Musical productions.

=== Career summary ===
- Florencia de La V began cross-dressing at the age of 16. She enrolled in a university in fashion design, and later took jobs as a designer and promoter.
- She also worked at the popular Buenos Aires club "Tabaris", replacing Cris Miró, a well known transvestite, in the show. It was while working there that she became a vedette, catching the eyes of television and theater producer Gerardo Sofovich.
- She made her acting debut in the TV show Polémica en el Bar ("Controversy at the Bar").
- De La V subsequently played small roles in many telenovelas and variety shows for Argentina's Telefe, but the show that made her an internationally known star has arguably been Los Roldán (2004), a sitcom that became a hit across South America and among digital television viewers in the United States. In Los Roldán, she played as "Raul Roldán", a transvestite who goes under the name "Laisa Roldán" when dressed as a woman.
- In 2012 she became the hostess of the semi-acted comedy and gossip show "La Pelu", with actress and comedian Gladys Florimonte.

Florencia de La V expressed that she felt a little uncomfortable at first with being given a job as a transvestite in the soap opera. Later on, however, she accepted the fact that her character shares some life characteristics with her, which made her more comfortable about playing "Laisa Roldán". She has said, however, that for her next roles, she would prefer to play a woman. After Los Roldán ended, Florencia De La V worked in Mar Del Plata.

In 1998, she met her partner, dentist Pablo Goycochea, whom she married on 2011 in Buenos Aires. She has two children, twins, a boy and girl.

=== Gender controversy ===
During August 2014, well-known Argentine reporter Jorge Lanata declared that De La V was not a woman but a transsexual. Actor Dario Grandinetti made a public comment on a Buenos Aires radio station supporting De La V and Lanata threatened Grandinetti with a perjury lawsuit.

== Filmography ==
- Bailando por un sueño (Participant)
- Súper Bailando 2019 (Participant)
- La Noche de la V (Host)
- Intrusos en el espectáculo (Host)

== Notes ==
Preceded by Carmen Barbieri	Bailando Por un Sueño (Argentina) Winner; Season 2 (August - September 2006)	Succeeded by Carla Conte
