= Hiperconectados =

- Created by: Telefe
- Presented by: Guillermo "Fierita" Catalano; Noelia Marzol
- Starring: Tomás Balmaceda; Maitena Aboitiz
- Country of origin: Argentina
- No. of seasons: Spanish language: 1

Production
- Executive producers: Cristian Chaparro; Martin Elizagaray
- Running time: 60 minutes
- Production company: Telefe Contenidos

Original release
- Network: Telefe
- Release: 12 January – 29 December 2012

Hiperconectados (English: Hyperlinked) was a television program covering the digital culture of Argentina, presented by Guillermo "Fierita" Catalano, actress Noelia Marzol and Tomas Balmaceda. It also features the voice of Maitena Aboitiz.

== General information ==
In Hiperconectados the latest digital trends are presented, including new social networks and video games. At the same time, they also have their space figures show, sports, music and their relationship with their favorite devices.

== Equipment ==
- Host: Fierita
- Co-hostess: Noelia Marzol and Tomás Balmaceda
- Locution: Maitena Aboitiz
- Scenography: Carlos Golac
- Setting: Luis Gonzalez Oliva
- Sound: Ruben Peratta
- Lighting: Pablo Tassara
- Post production: Gaston Carballal
- Technical producer: Marcelo Caltabiano
- Directors assistant: Daniel Mercatante
- Production: Marcelo Mateo, Eleonora Ranni, Carla Quiroga and Gabriel Kameniecki
- Address: Grendel Resquin and Angel Knight
- Executive producer(s): Cristian Chaparro and Martin Elizagaray
- Music: Claudio Bravo
