= Casados con hijos (Argentine TV series) =

Argentinian television series

- The Argento family with Dardo and María Elena
- Genre: Sitcom
- Created by: Michael G. Moye; Ron Leavitt
- Based on: Married... with Children by: Michael G. Moye; Ron Leavitt
- Written by: Diego Alarcón; Walter Lascialanda; Sebastián Rotstein; Axel Kuschevatzky; Jessica Waizbrot; Josefina Trotta
- Directed by: Claudio Ferrari
- Starring: Guillermo Francella; Florencia Peña; Érica Rivas; Marcelo de Bellis; Darío Lopilato; Luisana Lopilato
- Country of origin: Argentina
- Original language: Spanish
- No. of seasons: 2
- No. of episodes: 212

Production
- Executive producer: Mariano Berterreix
- Production location: Buenos Aires, Argentina
- Editors: Pablo Bagnus; Gabriel Magnanelli
- Running time: 26–46 minutes
- Production companies: Sony Pictures Television; Telefe Contenidos

Original release
- Network: Telefe
- Release: 12 April 2005 – 28 December 2006

Related
- ¿Quién es el Jefe?; La niñera

Casados con hijos is the Argentine remake of the American television sitcom Married... with Children (1987–1997) created by Michael G. Moye and Ron Leavitt. It was originally broadcast from 12 April 2005 to 28 December 2006 on the Telefe channel, consisting of 212 episodes across two seasons. It was shot in Buenos Aires, Argentina. The series stars Guillermo Francella, Florencia Peña, Érica Rivas, Marcelo de Bellis, Darío Lopilato, and Luisana Lopilato.

== Reception ==
Filming began in January 2005, and on 12 April the show premiered on Telefe, with a measurement of 28.9 index points of television audience in Argentina in its first episode. However, the audience could not be maintained and the measurements remained at an average of 18 points, having reached a minimum figure of 7.7 points. After being moved to a different time, viewership of re-runs of the first season managed to surpass the original broadcasts, making it one of the most watched programs of 2005 and 2006.

The success of the episodes already broadcast forced the television station to carry out a second season. It premiered on 14 August 2006 at 9:30 p.m. (UTC-3), reaching an average of 33.3 audience index points, being one of the most-watched fictional series that year. In total, the series has 212 episodes, with 137 in its first season and 75 in the second.

The success of the series transcended the borders of Argentina, and it was also broadcast by local channels in Uruguay. It also managed to be one of the most viewed series in Paraguay, Peru and Romania, where it was broadcast under the name Familia Argento.

The show has become a cult classic series on Argentine television and Telefe has reaired it from 2007 to the present (Re-runs are also on Sony Channel), broadcasting episodes at random with a moderate audience, both in the first afternoon, as in prime time.

== Cast and characters ==
In Casados con hijos, the adventures of the Argento family and the environment that surrounds them take place within the neighborhood of Bajo Flores in Buenos Aires, Argentina. Their neighbors are a newly married banking couple named Dardo and María Elena Fuseneco.

=== Main ===
- Guillermo Francella as José "Pepe" Argento:
  Born in Buenos Aires, Argentina, he is the son of Francisco Argento and of an unknown mother. Pepe is a very rude, insensitive, and selfish person who does not think of anyone but himself. He does not listen or pay attention to anyone, and is also vain, macho and pessimistic. On a dubious date sometime in the 1980s, he meets Mónica Potrelli. They enter into a courtship and marry. After that, he married Moni and had two children named Paola and Alfio. Pepe is a passionate Racing Club fan who played for the Tristán Suárez Social and Sports Club for more than 9 years. Pepe is a man disgusted with the life that he's living and tired of his family, which causes most of his sorrows. He works as an employee in a shoe store with an exaggeratedly low salary, while putting up with his annoying clients. He cares a lot about business and does anything to get it. Pepe is always unlucky; in almost every episode he aims to achieve something that favors him, but it always fails because of the intrusion of the characters either by accident or of their own free will. He frequently steals objects from Dardo and María Elena because he does not have enough money to buy things due to his low salary and his family's high spending. Pepe always seeks to be recognized or honored by his neighbors but unfortunately no one ever manages to recognize him.
- Florencia Peña as Mónica "Moni" Potrelli de Argento:
  Born in Tostado, Santa Fe, Argentina, Moni is between 38 and 40 years old. She is Pepe's wife and Alfio and Paola's mother. Moni is the representation of a somewhat incompetent, clumsy, extravagant housewife who is sexually unsatisfied by her husband. She is always exaggeratedly made up, wears bracelets and necklaces, and wears loose, brightly colored clothes. She has tangled and prominent blonde hair. She is not in charge of cleaning the house or buying food and likes to spend all afternoon and sometimes all day watching soap operas or teleoffer programs sitting on the couch while talking to her mother on the phone and drinking mate, something that Pepe and María Elena often criticize. She is also a fan of Susana Giménez and the television show Susana Gimenéz. Moni is a disaster at cooking, which her family frequently complains about. Moni always wants to have sex with her husband, something that Pepe always refuses to do due to the lack of interest and hatred he has for his wife.
- Érica Rivas as María Elena Caradagián de Fuseneco:
  The recent wife of Dardo Fuseneco who recently moved in with him next to the Argento house. She wears neat clothes in very light or very dark colors, and sometimes appears with an accessory, such as a hat. Her particular obsession with Dardo leads her to be constantly after him, and she tends to show off her good relationship with him a lot in front of the Argento family. She is presumptuous, haughty, and tends to highlight her possessions or her superiority to other people. She has a very explosive and unstable personality, and is subject to fits of hysteria, during which she shouts.
- María Elena is supposedly a friend of Moni, although she often presumes her marriage and life to her, which often generates discussions between them, Moni often calls her "yegua". María Elena hates Pepe, and has constant fights with him because of their differences. Pepe constantly shows great contempt for her, who usually responds almost always with fine and far-fetched dialogues insulting them, until a burst of hysteria usually occurs. From the seventh episode of the second season, María Elena claims to have a daughter called "La Nena", who does not actually exist; despite having a sexually active life with Dardo, they never had children. She is a bit of an alcoholic.
- Marcelo de Bellis as Dardo Fuseneco:
  He is tall and muscular, with short black hair, who wears clothes of an upper middle class person and an expensive looking watch. He proves to be intelligent and well educated, and uses a very firm and serious vocabulary. Dardo is a neighbor of the Argento family. Together with his wife they moved to the neighboring house a short time ago. He has no children and maintains a very good marriage with his wife, and they are very emotionally attached. He soon established a friendly relationship with Pepe and always acts as his faithful friend, so much so that he sometimes ignores his wife. In several episodes, Pepe easily manipulates Dardo by comparing his friendship to that of Lennon-McCartney. Before meeting María Elena, Dardo used to have relationships with women very deliberately. This affects Dardo's relationship with his wife, so it is also widely spoken by Pepe when the two are together. Many times this character is somewhat credulous and naive, almost always being convinced of doing certain things induced by Pepe, who turns out to be somewhat manipulative of his friend. In the end he gets Dardo in serious trouble when something Pepe plans goes wrong, although they always end up reconciling. A detail shown in some episodes is that Dardo feels sexual attraction towards Mónica, especially her exuberant bust, but does not dare to do anything because of his friendship with Pepe.
- Darío Lopilato as Alfio "Coqui" Argento:
  Born in 1990, his name is Alfio in honor of Alfio Basile, former player and coach of Racing Club, which shows his father's fanaticism for football. But everyone calls him Coqui. He has the physique of a teenager and the mentality of a complete mindless. He has a rather exaggerated personality. He dresses in dark clothes and a necklace. Alfio is childish and greatly desires a partner, although he is frequently rejected. He is frequently exalted at the appearance somewhere of women acting groggy in the face of this situation. Many times he tried to get closer to María Elena, but failed. Despite being frequently rejected, "Coqui" has sex with at least two women: the girlfriend of his cousin Jaime, and Barbara Bush, the daughter of the former president of the United States George W. Bush.
- Luisana Lopilato as Paola Argento:
  She was born in 1988. The clothes that Paola wears are very varied in terms of shape and color, although she frequently appears dressed in short skirts and generally light-colored T-shirts. Paola is the most clumsy member of the Argento Family. She lacks tact and wisdom. She does not know how to write, say or read most of the words well. Her clumsiness has gotten her or anyone around her into trouble. They usually call her "moron". She is a fan of Britney Spears. At times, she is quite aware, such as when she engages in some kind of discussion with her brother, where she often appears as having more life experience, mainly in the sexual realm, although, she is actually naive on the subject. In the second season she is not seen much because Lopilato was recording the telenovela Alma Pirata. This absence is initially concealed by saying that she went to a models school. She suddenly appears at the ending, causing the surprise of the public and her father.

=== Side characters ===
- Manuel Wirtz as Lalo:
  Pepe's friend and co-worker at the shoe store. He is part of Pepe and Dardo's group of friends, who sometimes play tricks or go to the casinos. His real name and surname were never stated on the series.
- Violeta as Fatiga:
  The family dog, who receives increasingly more screen time over the series. Violet was the twin sister of the dog Betún, also an actor, who appeared in series such as Los Simuladores. Fatiga has beige fur and a large build. Fatiga lives up to her name, having in her scenes a completely tired, listless and inattentive attitude, never doing practically anything and remaining lying on armchairs or cushions on the floor most of the time. María Elena hates her because she always defecates in her own garden. In the episode "Todos los perros van al cielo" it is discovered that Fatiga's owner is Coqui. She is often a companion of Pepe and Coqui, and they speak to her as a friend as they reflect on their life.

== Episodes ==
=== Finale ===
Pepe answers the door to his neighbors, the Fusenecos, who have noticed that his furniture is covered with sheets, typical of people moving out. Moni, Paola and Coqui come to the door, singing "Presente" by Vox Dei, and tell their neighbors that they are moving to a farm in Santa Fe, Argentina, near where Moni's mother lives. They begin a farewell toast.

That night, Pepe organizes a "picada" for his neighbors, who went to the Argento's. At one point, Dardo's cell rings, he was the manager of the bank where he and his wife work, and he informs them that they were raffled to go to work at a bank branch in Paris, France. When Dardo communicates to the Argentos, they do not believe him, and refer to an alleged revenge for the joke they made him, but Dardo forgets his cell phone at the Argento house and receives a call from his Manager that Pepe answers, confirming the time of the trip.

The next day, between tears and goodbyes, Pepe and Moni say goodbye to them, while Coqui and Paola accompany them to the Ministro Pistarini International Airport. After saying goodbye, the new neighbors, Pablo Echarri and Mariela Fernández, move into the house. There is an introductory dialogue paralleling that of the first episode of the series, indicating that the new neighbors are in many ways the same as the previous ones.

=== Comparison between the first and second seasons ===
At the end of the recording of the first season, the episodes were not reaching the expected ratings. In reruns, the series became famous and acclaimed by the public. This is why after almost a year of repetitions in most cases seen for the first time by the public, it was necessary to start a second season. The set of the series had been disassembled and removed from the place, since other series were recorded there. The setting for the set had to be reassembled and the cast had to be reunited.

The set was modified, adopting a lighter color palette in the second season, becoming more tidy, and appearing more like a wealthy middle-class house. Additionally, the show's microphones, sometimes visible in the first season, were better hidden.

In the first season, almost all the chapters respected the original script of the American series Married... with Children, while in the second season there were more changes, such as combining content from several original episodes into one, or reconstructing the scripts to achieve a story more adapted to the local humor.

In the second season Pepe became less aggressive towards women, and insulted people less. In the second season his appearance was changed to look more like a middle-class person. In a similar vein, Moni began to impose herself a little more in the second season. On the other hand, Dardo was changed from a more serious man to a more comic and liberated character. This partially was due to a change of actors in the original American series for the equivalent character.

The series' opening changed for the second season. In the first season, the opening was a sequence which introduced the characters through in cartoon form. In the second season, the opening switched to live-action clips of the characters from various episodes.

== Theatrical version ==
Towards the end of 2018, Guillermo Francella and Marcelo de Bellis announced that they adapting the series in a theatrical version, which they projected would premiere around 2019. Due to work commitments by Florencia Peña, the project did not materialize. On 2 August 2019, it was confirmed that the series members signed a contract for the return of Casados con hijos.

On 1 December 2019, Florencia Peña announced on the Susana Giménez program that the entire cast would be included, except for Violeta, the dog who played Fatiga, who had died.

When, at the beginning of 2020, Érica Rivas did not appear as part of the cast, some ticket-buyers demanded refunds. Rivas indicated that the writers called her a feminazi after she asked for changes in the script to jokes about the physical appearance of a female character. She also clarified that she had not disclosed this information to the press, and also demanded an explanation from the production companies in charge of the project. RGB Entertainment, Gustavo Yankelevich, and Telefe pointed out that there was no signed contract and that the separation was due to "artistic disagreement". Finally, in April 2020, the absence of the actress in the play was confirmed.

The play was to premiere on 12 June 2020 and continue through July and August, but due to the COVID-19 pandemic, it was postponed until January 2021. Given the persistence of the pandemic, the production company made the decision to cancel the play on 15 October 2020.

Casados con hijos finally premiered at Teatro Gran Rex on 5 January 2023, filling the 3,200-person venue for the debut. The two-month run of the stage play was financially successful and extra dates were added to the register for Carnaval.

== Awards and nominations ==
=== Martín Fierro Awards 2005 ===
- Best Comedy - Casados con hijos (won)
- Best Actor in Comedy - Guillermo Francella (won)
- Best Actress in Comedy - Florencia Peña (won)
- Best Actress in Comedy - Érica Rivas (nominated)

=== Clarín Entertainment Awards 2005 ===
- Best New Actor - Darío Lopilato (nominated)
- Best Actress - Florencia Peña (nominated)

=== Martín Fierro Awards 2006 ===
- Best Comedy - Casados con hijos (nominated)
- Best Actor in Comedy - Guillermo Francella (nominated)
- Best Actress in Comedy - Florencia Peña (nominated)
- Best Co-actress in Comedy - Érica Rivas (won)
- Best Co-actor in Comedy - Darío Lopilato (nominated)
- Best Co-actress in Comedy - Luisana Lopilato (nominated)

=== Clarín Entertainment Awards 2006 ===
- Best Comedy - Casados con hijos (nominated)
- Best Actress in Comedy - Florencia Peña (nominated)
- Best Actress in Comedy - Érica Rivas (won)

=== Clarín Entertainment Awards 2007 ===
- Best Actor in Comedy - Guillermo Francella (nominated)
