= Darío Lopilato =

Argentine actor

- Born: Darío Eduardo Lopilato de la Torre; January 29, 1981 (age 45); Buenos Aires, Argentina
- Occupation: Actor
- Years active: 1997–present
- Relatives: Daniela Lopilato (sister); Luisana Lopilato (sister); Michael Bublé (brother-in-law)

Darío Eduardo Lopilato de la Torre (born January 29, 1981) is an Argentine actor, brother of Luisana Lopilato.

== Biography ==
Darío Lopilato was born to Eduardo Lopilato and Beatriz de la Torre. He has an older sister, actress and nutritionist Daniela Lopilato, and a younger sister, actress and model Luisana Lopilato. He is of Spanish and Italian descent; his great-grandfather was an immigrant from Muro Lucano, province of Potenza. Lopilato grew up in an evangelical Christian family and has stated that he is a devout Christian.

== Filmography ==
=== Television ===
Year	Title	Character	Channel
1997-1998	Cebollitas	Nicolás	Telefe
1998	Chiquititas		Telefe
1999	Trillizos ¡dijo la partera!	Tomás	Telefe
2000	Chiquititas	Ignacio Montero	Telefe
2001	Poné a Francella	Son of Rigor	Telefe
2002	Maridos a domicilio	Tomás	Canal 9
2002	Rebelde Way	Cholo	Canal 9
2002	Franco Buenaventura, el profe	Rulo	Telefe
2003	Dr. Amor	Carlos "Fito" Carrizo	Canal 13
2004	Culpable de este amor	Alejo Nicolás García	Telefe
2005-2006	Casados con Hijos	Alfio "Coqui" Argento	Telefe
2007	El Capo	Pablo Svarsky	Telefe
2008–2009	Atracción x4	Pablo Milhojas	Canal 13
2011	Historias de la primera vez	Simón	América TV
2012	Los únicos	Francisco "Pancho" Dreyfus	Canal 13
2014-2015	Viudas e hijos del Rock & Roll	Agustín "El Piojo" Pulido	Telefe
2016	Círculos	Marcos	América TV
2018-2019	Mi hermano es un clon	Fausto	Canal 13
2019	Pequeña Victoria	Octavio Fortunatti	Telefe

=== Theater ===
Year	Title	Character
2007	El tenor	
2008	El libro de la selva	Mowgly
2009	Socorro malcriados!	
2010-2011	Pasión	Dany Turner
2012	20000 leguas de viaje submarino en 3D	Captain Nemo
2013	Usted puede ser un asesino	
2014	El maravilloso mundo de Pinocho	Pinocho
2015-2016	Bajo Terapia	Esteban
2018	Entretelones	
2019	El Crédito	
2020	Hello, Dolly!	
2020	Hermanos	Polo

=== Movies ===
Year	Movie	Character	Director
2008	Los Superagentes, nueva generación	Agent Mojarrita	Daniel De Felippo
2011	Querida, voy a comprar cigarrillos y vuelvo	Ernesto	Mariano Cohn and Gastón Duprat
2015	El desafío	Rulo	Juan Manuel Rampoldi
2017	You Only Live Once	Yosi	Federico Cueva
2018	¿Qué puede pasar?	Mario "Marito"	Andrés Tambornino and Alejandro Gruz

=== Television programs ===
Year	Program	Channel	Notes
2009-2010	La comunidad	Canal 13	Host
2011	Extra pequeño	Canal 13	Host
2011	ZooBichos	Telefe	Host
2012-2014	Uti Kids	Utilísima	Host
2014	Almorzando con Mirtha Legrand	Canal 13	Guest
2020	Flor de equipo	Telefe	Guest
2021	Intrusos	América TV	Guest

== Awards and nominations ==
Year	Award	Category	Work	Result
2005	Clarín Awards	Male Revelation	Casados con Hijos	Nominated
2006	Martín Fierro Awards	Supporting Actor in a Comedy	Casados con Hijos	Nominated
2007	Martín Fierro Awards	Supporting Actor in a Comedy	El Capo	Nominated
