= La Niñera (Argentine TV series) =

- Genre: Sitcom
- Based on: The Nanny by: Fran Drescher; Peter Marc Jacobson
- Written by: Diego Alarcon; Fran Drescher
- Directed by: Claudio Ferrari
- Starring: Florencia Peña; Boy Olmi; Roberto Carnaghi; Carola Reyna; Agustina Córdova; Malena Luchetti; Mariano Colombo; Mirta Busnelli; Carmen Vallejo; Jorgelina Aruzzi
- Country of origin: Argentina
- Original language: Spanish
- No. of seasons: 2
- No. of episodes: 175

Production
- Executive producer: Mariano Berterreix
- Producers: Fran Drescher; Prudence Fraser; Peter Marc Jacobson; Frank Lombardi; Garyn Lucas; Robert Sternin; Diane Wilk
- Production location: TeleSet Studios
- Running time: 30 minutes (approx.)
- Production company: Sony Pictures Entertainment

Original release
- Network: Telefe
- Release: January 19, 2004 – March 19, 2005

Related
- The Nanny

La Niñera is an in Argentine sitcom based on the American television series The Nanny, starring Florencia Peña, Boy Olmi, Roberto Carnaghi and Carola Reyna. The series consisted of two seasons, airing from 2004 to 2005.

== Plot ==
Flor Finkel, is an extravagant woman who starts working as a nanny for the Iraolas, a very wealthy family, formed by Juan Manuel Iraola, and his three children, Maggie, Agustín and Mica. In addition, the family has a butler named Fidel and Tete, a business partner of Juan Manuel (who is in love with him). Slowly but surely, Flor will give life to the house, turning it into a lovely home.

== Cast ==
- Florencia Peña as Flor Finkel (Fran Fine)
- Boy Olmi as Juan Manuel Iraola (Maxwell Sheffield)
- Roberto Carnaghi as Fidel (Niles)
- Carola Reyna as Teté López Lynch (C.C.)
- Agustina Córdova as Maggie Iraola (Margaret)
- Malena Luchetti as Micaela Iraola (Grace)
- Mariano Colombo as Juan Agustín Iraola (Brighton)
- Mirta Busnelli as Silvia Finkel (Sylvia Fine)
- Jorgelina Aruzzi as Vale (Val)

== Guest stars ==
The sitcom had a large number of celebrities who participated in the program, such as comedians and singers. The most prominent were Ricardo Montaner, Pablo Galan, Chayanne, Diego Torres, and others.
