= Alejandro Wiebe =

Argentine television host and producer

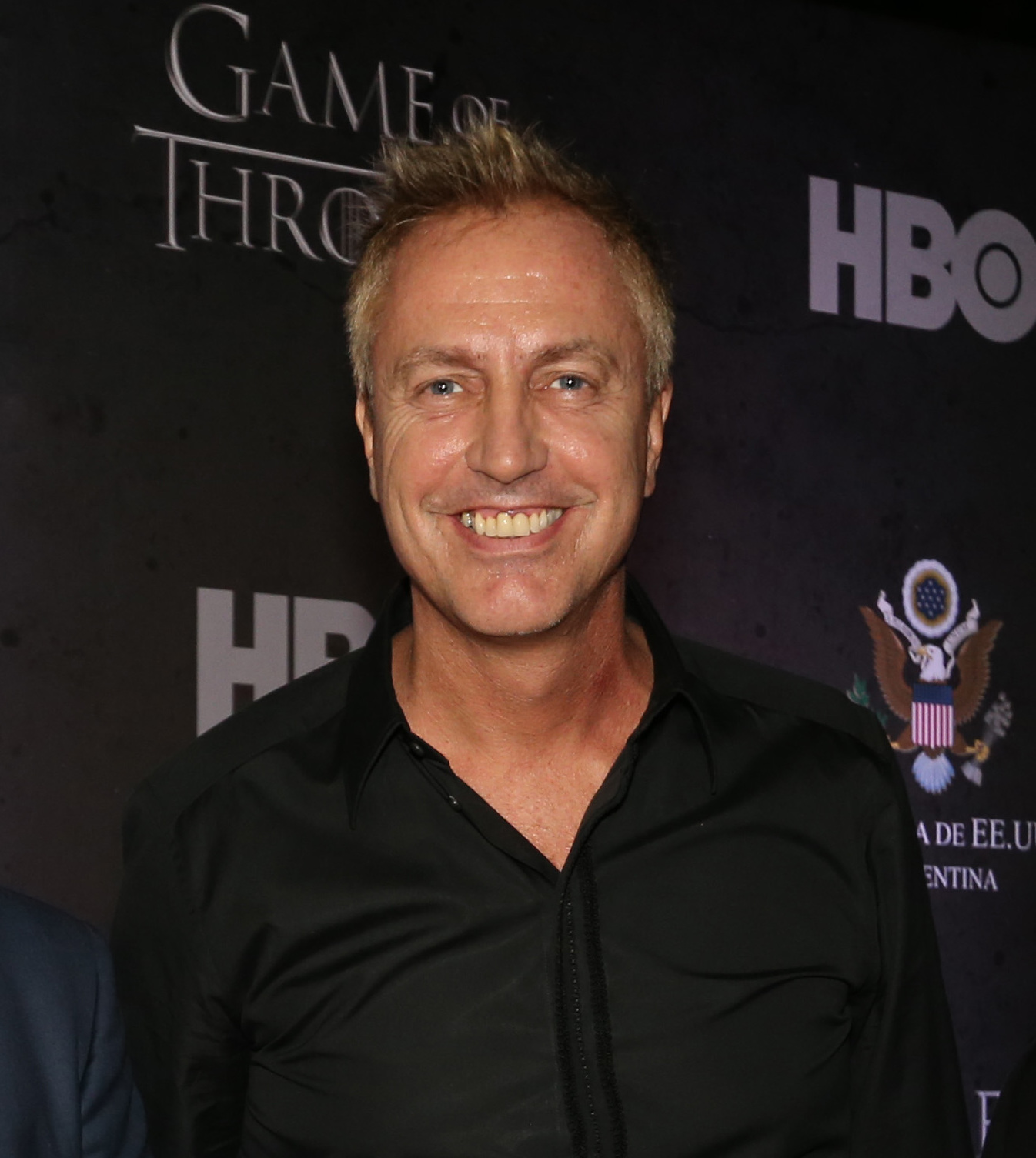
- Wiebe in 2015
- Born: 1 June 1970 (age 55); Carapachay, Buenos Aires, Argentina
- Other names: Marley
- Occupations: Television host; comedian; television producer
- Years active: 2002–present

Alejandro Wiebe (born 1 June 1970), also known as Marley, is an Argentine television host, comedian actor and producer.

== Early life ==
Wiebe and his older brother went to a private school. At one point, his mother had to ask for half a scholarship to keep Marley at that school. Marley repeated the second year of high school, because he failed in English.

== Career ==
In 2002 he worked at the Telefe channel, with the program MundoShow. The show was about trips to different parts of the world, accompanied by celebrities from the country and ended in 2003.

Throughout 2003 he hosted the program El show de la tarde, together with Florencia Peña. That same year, after having made the first season of his celebrity biographies program called Protagonistas únicos, he was chosen to host the galas of the first season of the reality show Operación triunfo. At the end of 2003, he began Por el mundo, as a replacement to MundoShow and that would last until 2007. In 2004, he made Odisea, en busca del escarabajo dorado, from Costa Rica, which would later have two more seasons: Odisea, en busca del tesoro perdido (2005) and Odisea, aventura argentina (2007). He was called to do three more seasons of Operación triunfo: 2004–2005, 2005–2006 and 2009.

== Personal life ==
On 27 October 2017, in Chicago, United States, his son Mirko Wiebe was born, through surrogacy. Marley chose the egg from a Russian donor and the womb from an African-American. In August 2024, he came out as gay.

== Television ==
Year	Show	Channel	Notes
1991–1992	Fax	Canal 13	Showbiz columnist
1993–1995	360: todo para ver	Canal 13	General topics
1993–1995	TN Show	Todo Noticias	Showbiz columnist
1996	Clotilde en Teleshow	Canal 13	Showbiz columnist
1996–1999	Teleshow	Canal 13	Showbiz columnist
1999–2001	Telepasillo	Canal 13	Showbiz columnist
2000–2002	Teleshow internacional	Canal 13	Travelling show
2001–2002	Expedientes Teleshow	Canal 13	Celebrities biography
2002–2003	MundoShow	Telefe	Travelling show
2003	El show de la tarde	Telefe	Entertainment and humor show, with Florencia Peña
2003	Operación Triunfo (1st Season)	Telefe	Reality singing competition
2003	Protagonistas Únicos (1st Season)	Telefe	Celebrities biography
2003–2006	Por el mundo	Telefe	Travelling show
2004	Odisea, en busca del escarabajo dorado	Telefe	Celebrity survival competition, from Costa Rica
2004–2005	Operación Triunfo (2nd Season)	Telefe	Reality singing competition
2005	Odisea, en busca del tesoro perdido	Telefe	Celebrity survival competition, from Costa Rica
2005–2006	Operación Triunfo (3rd Season)	Telefe	Reality singing competition
2007	Odisea, aventura argentina	Telefe	Celebrity survival competition, from Argentina
2007–2008	Viaje de locos	Telefe	Travelling show, with Florencia Peña
2008–2009	El muro infernal	Telefe	Entertainment show
2009	Operación Triunfo (4th Season)	Telefe	Reality singing competition
2010	3, 2, 1 ¡A ganar!	Telefe	Entertainment show
2010	Protagonistas Únicos (2nd Season)	Telefe	Celebrities biography
2011–2013	Minuto para ganar	Telefe	Entertainment show
2012	La Voz Argentina (Season 1)	Telefe	Reality singing competition
2013	Celebrity Splash!	Telefe	Celebrity diving competition
2013–2014	Tu cara me suena (Season 1)	Telefe	Celebrity impersonation competition
2014	La Nave de Marley	Telefe	Entertainment show
2014	Tu cara me suena (Season 2)	Telefe	Celebrity impersonation competition
2014–2015	El destino perfecto	Telefe	Travelling show
2014–2016	La ciencia de lo absurdo	NatGeo	Entertainment show
2015	Elegidos (La música en tus manos) (Season 1)	Telefe	Reality singing competition
2015	Tu cara me suena (Season 3)	Telefe	Celebrity impersonation competition
2015	Elegidos (La música en tus manos) (Season 2)	Telefe	Reality singing competition
2016	Dueños de la cocina	Telefe	Gastronomy show
2016	La peluquería de don Mateo	Telefe	Client
2016	Marley presenta	Telefe	Celebrities biography
2017	Despedida de Solteros	Telefe	Reality competition show, with Carina Zampini
2018	La Voz Argentina (Season 2)	Telefe	Reality singing competition
2018	Por el Mundo: Mundial	Telefe	Travelling show in Russia during the 2018 FIFA World Cup
2020	Por el Mundo: en Casa	Telefe	Travelling show hosted from home
2021	La Voz Argentina (Season 3)	Telefe	Reality singing competition
2022	La Voz Argentina (Season 4)	Telefe	Reality singing competition
2022	Por el Mundo: Mundial	Telefe	Travelling show in Qatar during the 2022 FIFA World Cup
2023	The Challenge Argentina: El Desafío	Telefe	Reality competition (host)
2023	The Challenge: World Championship	Paramount+	Reality competition (co-host)
2024	Survivor, Expedición Robinson	Telefe	Reality competition (host)

== Awards ==
=== Nominations ===
- 2013 Martín Fierro Awards
  - Best male TV host (for Tu cara me suena)
