= Florencia Peña =

Argentine actress (born 1974)

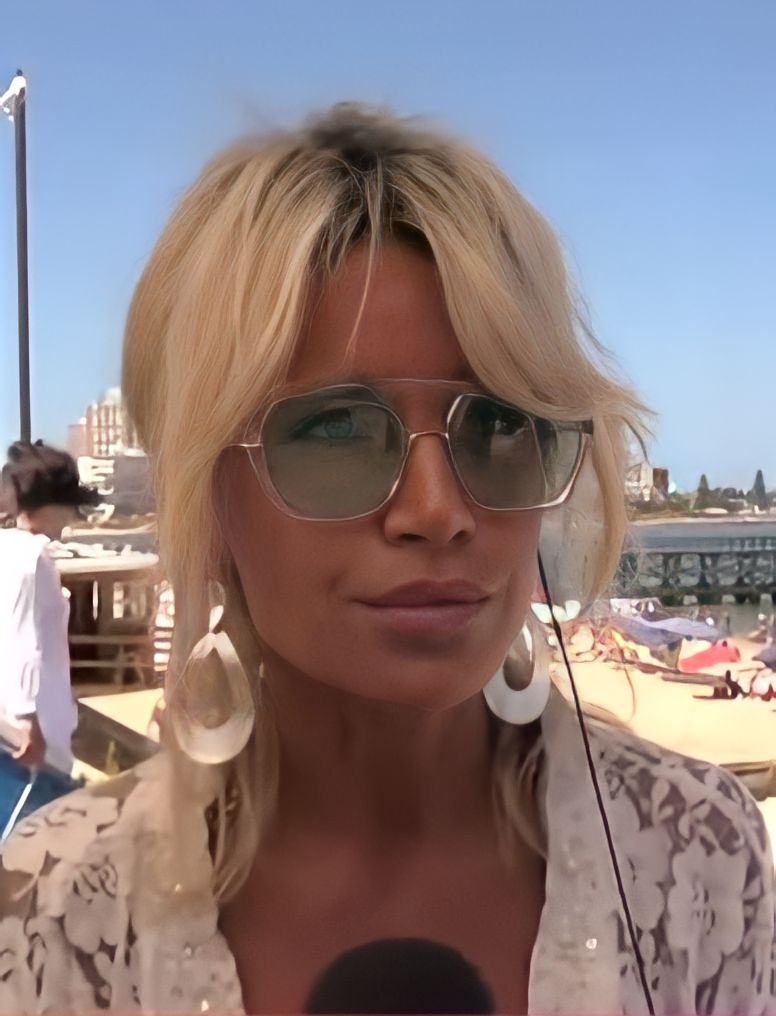
- Peña in 2022
- Born: María Florencia Peña; 7 November 1974 (age 51); Pinamar, Buenos Aires Province, Argentina
- Occupation: Actress
- Years active: 1983–present
- Spouse: Mariano Otero (m. 2005; div. 2012)
- Partner(s): Ramiro Ponce de León (2013–present; engaged)
- Children: 3

María Florencia Peña (born 7 November 1974) is an Argentine actress. She played Mónica Argento in the sitcom Casados con hijos (2005–2006).

== Filmography ==
=== Television ===
Year	Title	Character	Channel
1983	Festilindo		Canal 13
1985	La gente del 2000		TV Pública
1987	Chispiluz		TV Pública
1987	Los viernes de Luisina		TV Pública
1987	Hombres de ley		TV Pública
1988	SúperMingo		Canal 11
1988–1989	Clave de Sol		Canal 13
1989–1990	Nosotros y los otros	Julieta	Canal 13/Canal 9
1990	Atreverse		Telefe
1990	Amigos son los amigos	Yanina	Telefe
1991	Regalo del cielo	Silvia	Canal 9
1992–1995	Son de diez	Bárbara	Canal 13
1996–1997	Sueltos	Victoria	Canal 13
1997–1998	De corazón	Rita	Canal 13
1998	La condena de Gabriel Doyle	Blanca	Canal 9
1999	La nocturna		Canal 13
1999–2000	Verano del '98	Guadalupe Arriaga	Telefe
2000	Chabonas		América TV
2000	Tiempo final		Telefe
2000–2001	Luna salvaje	Ana	Telefe
2001–2002	Poné a Francella	Mrs. Robles/Laura/Eloísa	Telefe
2002	Tiempo final		Telefe
2003	Disputas	Majo	Telefe
2004–2005	La niñera	Florencia Finkel	Telefe
2005–2006	Casados con Hijos	Mónica Potrelli de Argento	Telefe
2007	Hechizada	Samantha	Telefe
2008	Una de dos	Eva	Telefe
2009	Los exitosos Pells	Lucía Naba	Telefe
2009–2010	Botineras	Giselle López	Telefe
2010	Porque te quiero así	Susana Macedo	Canal 10
2011	Sr. y Sra. Camas	Débora Camas	TV Pública
2012	Tiempos compulsivos	Lara	Canal 13
2015	Viudas e hijos del Rock & Roll	Denise Saravia	Telefe
2015–2016	Conflictos modernos	Judge Julia Martínez	Canal 9
2016	La Peluquería de Don Mateo	Flor de Alelí	Telefe
2016–2018	Psiconautas	Fabiana	TBS Very Funny
2017	Quiero vivir a tu lado	Natalia Roucco de Justo	Canal 13
2019	Otros pecados	Sandra	Canal 13
2019	Tu parte del trato	Rosita	Canal 13

=== Theater ===
Year	Title	Character	Director
1987	Las payasas		
1994	Hamburgueses		Carlos Moreno
1996	Tomi		
1997	La Cenicienta	Jazmín	
1997	Convivencia		
1998	En mi cuarto, Blancanieves	Blanca Nieves	Andrés Bazzalo
1998	Mamá es una estrella		Ángel Mahler
1999	Shakespiriando		Gerardo Hochman
2000	Desangradas en glamour		José María Muscari
2001	Confesiones de mujeres de 30		Lía Jelín
2002	Grease!	Rizzo	Mike Ribas
2002	El romance del Romeo y la Julieta	Julieta	Manuel González Gil and Rubén Pires
2002	La edad de la ciruela		Rubén Pires
2002	Babilonia		Sergio Lombardo
2003	Alicia maravilla	Alicia	José María Muscari
2004–2005	Monólogos de la vagina		Lía Jelín
2005	Revista nacional		Manuel González Gil
2006–2007	Sweet Charity	Charity	Enrique Federman
2009	Frankie y Johnny en el claro de luna	Frankie	Leonor Manso
2009	Danza de verano		Jorge Azurmendi
2010–2011	Un Dios salvaje		Javier Daulte
2011–2012	Cuando Harry conoció a Sally	Sally	Manuel González Gil
2012	Primeras Damas del Musical		Pablo Gorlero and Ricky Pashkus
2012	El hijo de puta del sombrero	Valeria	Javier Daulte
2013–2014	Anything Goes		Javier Faroni
2014–2015	Casi Diva		
2016	Se quieren mucho... poquito, nada		
2016	Me canto encima		
2017–2019	Los vecinos de arriba	Ana	Javier Daulte
2019	Cabaret (musical)	Sally Bowles	Gustavo Yankelevich
2021	Perdida-mente	Aurora	José María Muscari
2021	Coqueluche	Carmela	Manuel González Gil

=== Movies ===
Year	Movie	Character	Director
2000	Ángel, la diva y yo	Ana	Pablo Nisenson
2002	¿Y dónde está el bebé?		Pedro Stocki
2005	Chicken Little	Abby Patosa	Mark Dindal
2006	Chile 672	Flopi	Pablo Bardauil and Franco Verdoia
2011	Juntos para siempre	Laura	Pablo Solarz
2012	Dormir al sol	Adriana María	Alejandro Chomski
2017	Soy tu karma	Nuria	
2018	El Potro	Beatriz Olave	Lorena Muñoz
2019	Los adoptantes	Vicky	Daniel Gimelberg
2020	Hoy se arregla el mundo		Ariel Winograd
2020	Valle de lobos		Alex Tossenberger
2021	Cromos ápices		Gabriel Grieco
2021	Al tercer día		Daniel de la Vega

=== Television Programs ===
Year	Program	Channel	Notes
2002–2003	La banda de Cantaniño	Telefe	Host
2003	El show de la tarde	Telefe	Host
2005	Flor de Marley	Telefe	Program not broadcast
2007–2008	Viaje de locos	Telefe	Host
2009	Flor de palabra	Telefe	Host
2010	Cuando dije basta	Cosmopolitan	Host
2012	Bailando 2012	Canal 13	Contestant
2013	Dale la tarde	Canal 13	Host
2014	La Nave de Marley	Telefe	Host
2014	Tu cara me suena (Season 2)	Telefe	Contestant
2015	Tu cara me suena (Season 3)	Telefe	Guest Judge
2017	Bailando 2017	Canal 13	Judge in replacement of Carolina Ardohain
2018	Bailando 2018	Canal 13	Judge
2019	Bailando 2019	Canal 13	Judge
2020	Cortá por Lozano	Telefe	Host in replacement of Verónica Lozano
2020	Flor de equipo	Telefe	Host

== Awards and nominations ==
Year	Award	Category	Work	Result
2002	Martín Fierro Awards	Humorous Work	Poné a Francella	Nominated
2002	Clarín Awards	Best Actress	Poné a Francella	Nominated
2002	ACE Awards	Best Musical Actress	El Romance del Romeo y la Julieta	Nominated
2002	Estrella de Mar Awards	Best Leading Actress	El Romance del Romeo y la Julieta	Nominated
2003	Martín Fierro Awards	Best Leading Actress of Miniseries	Disputas	Winner
2004	Martín Fierro Awards	Best Leading Actress in Comedy	La niñera	Winner
2004	Clarín Awards	Best Actress	La niñera	Nominated
2005	Martín Fierro Awards	Best Leading Actress in Comedy	Casados con Hijos	Winner
2005	Clarín Awards	Best Actress	Casados con Hijos	Nominated
2006	Martín Fierro Awards	Best Leading Actress in Comedy	Casados con Hijos	Nominated
2006	Clarín Awards	Best Leading Actress in Comedy	Casados con Hijos	Nominated
2006	Florencio Awards	Best Musical Actress	Sweet Charity	Nominated
2006	Trinidad Guevara Awards	Best Leading Theater Actress	Sweet Charity	Nominated
2007	Clarín Awards	Best Leading Actress in Comedy	Casados con Hijos	Nominated
2007	Clarín Awards	Best Leading Actress in Comedy	Hechizada	Nominated
2007	ACE Awards	Best Musical Actress	Sweet Charity	Winner
2008	ACE Awards	Best Leading Actress in Drama	Frankie & Johnny en el Claro de Luna	Nominated
2009	ACE Awards	Best Leading Actress in Drama	Un Dios Salvaje	Winner
2010	ACE Awards	Best Leading Actress in Drama	Un Dios Salvaje	Winner
2011	Iris Awards	Best Actress of Daily Fiction	Porque te quiero así	Winner
2011	Konex Foundation	Television Actress	Trajectory of the Decade	Winner
2012	Carlos Paz Awards	Best Comedy Actress	Cuando Harry conoció a Sally	Winner
2012	ACE Awards	Best Leading Actress in Drama	El hijo de puta del sombrero	Winner
2012	Silver Condor Awards	Best Supporting Actress	Dormir al sol	Winner
2014	ACE Awards	Best Musical Actress	Anything Goes	Winner
2014	Estrella de Mar Awards	Best Leading Actress	Anything Goes	Winner
2014	Hugo Awards	Best Leading Actress in Musical	Anything Goes	Nominated
2015	Carlos Paz Awards	Best Actress	Casi Diva	Winner
2015	VOS Awards	Best Actress	Casi Diva	Winner
2015	Estrella de Mar Concert Awards	Best Comedy Actress	Casi Diva	Winner
2016	Estrella de Mar Awards	Best Leading Actress in Comedy	Se quieren mucho... poquito, nada	Nominated
2019	ACE Awards	Best Musical Actress	Cabaret (musical)	Winner
