= Bailando 2021 =

- Season 15
- Hosted by: Marcelo Tinelli
- Judges: Ángel de Brito; Carolina Ardohain; Guillermina Valdés; Jimena Barón; Hernán Piquín
- Celebrity winner: Noelia Marzol
- Professional winner: Jonathan Lazarte

Release
- Original network: El Trece
- Original release: May 17 – December 10, 2021

Season chronology
- ← Previous; Bailando 2019 Next → Bailando 2023

Bailando 2021 is the fifteenth season of Bailando por un Sueño which premiered as a segment on the program Showmatch on 17 May 2021, on the El Trece network following the permanent cancellation of the planned 2020 season. However, the competition will start a day later, on 18 May. Marcelo Tinelli returned as host. In addition, the program will feature for the first time a digital host who will be Lizardo Ponce (also a contestant in this edition).

The season was also named as "La Academia" (The academy), because participants must learn and show multiple artistic disciplines —singing, skating, acrobatics, imitation, acting— in addition to performing a dance presentation. There will be new challenges from different artistic manifestations.

A new format change was introduced for the rest of the season: In the duel, the couples will have to make a different presentation (it does not necessarily have to be dance, it can be another discipline).

What is new about this season is that the judges are going to have the power (in some rounds) to eliminate a couple —although this mechanism has been carried out in the previous season in the rounds of "Duels I" and "Duels II"—. Also on some occasions (in the event of a tie), María Laura "Lolo" Rossi and Eugenia López Frugoni, the choreographers chiefs, define the eliminated couple.

== Cast ==
On 4 May was presented the official photo of the cast (celebrities, judges and presenter).

=== Couples ===
Initially, 23 teams were confirmed. This season 5 couples made up of celebrities participate, they are: Ezequiel Cwirkaluk & Bárbara Silenzi; Florencia Vigna & Facundo Mazzei; Luciana Salazar & Jorge Moliniers; Pablo Prada & Lourdes Sánchez and Ulises Bueno & Rocío Pardo.

The 24th team is made up of two celebrities: producer Pablo Prada and dancer Lourdes Sánchez (Prada's girlfriend). They were summoned in the first program by Tinelli.

Due to the low number of couples (15) at this time of year (in August), the production decided to add more couples to the show. On 10 August, the new contestants were officially confirmed: Ariel Puchetta, Celeste Muriega (who participated in this edition as a replacement for Bárbara Silenzi), Lionel Ferro, Mariela Anchipi (who replaced Sofía Jiménez for 4 rounds) and Rodrigo Tapari. Nazarena Veléz was confirmed to join the show as a new addition in round 10; but for personal reasons she retired (before her debut).

On 20 September, Nazareno Móttola (who was a substitute contestant this season) was confirmed to be competing in the show.

On 21 September, Agustín Barajas (Hernán Piquín's boyfriend) was confirmed to be participating in the competition. In addition, a live casting was held to find the dance partner among the dancers on the La Academia's staff: Estefanía Pais, Julia «Juja» Pérez and Loana «Loli» Ruiz were the pre-selected for the position; being latter selected by the judges as a professional from Barajas.

Celebrity	Celebrity or Professional	Current status	Previously status	Ref.
Pablo «El Chato» Prada (Note: Pablo Prada and Lourdes Sánchez withdrew from the competition for personal reasons. They only participated in one round, as they resigned before making their second presentation. They were replaced by the first eliminated couple, from this season, Gustavo Parisi & Melody Luz Stocchetti.) (TV and theater producer)	Lourdes Sánchez (Dancer & TV host)	Withdrew on 2 June 2021		
Ulises Bueno (Note: Ulises Bueno announced that he is withdrawing from the competition for work reasons (abroad). Rocío Pardo, his girlfriend, will accompany him on his work trip.) (Singer)	Rocío Pardo (Dancer & actress)	Withdrew on 9 June 2021		
Julieta Puente (Journalist, TV host & fitness influencer)	Facundo Insúa	Eliminated 2nd on 10 June 2021		
Charlotte Caniggia (Reality TV star & model)	Ignacio Gonatta	Eliminated 3rd on 23 June 2021		
Gustavo «Cucho» Parisi (Note: Returned to the competition in the second round with his team.) (Singer-songwriter)	Melody Luz Stocchetti	Eliminated 4th on 5 July 2021	Eliminated 1st on 27 May 2021	
Romina Ricci (Actress, screenwriter & film director)	Juan Manuel Palao	Eliminated 5th on 14 July 2021		
Mariana Genesio Peña (Note: Mariana Genesio Peña announced that she is withdrawing from the competition for work reasons.) (Actress)	Rodrigo Jara	Withdrew on 22 July 2021		
Bárbara Franco (Model)	Gabriel Rentería	Eliminated 6th on 28 July 2021		
Mar Tarrés (Model, actress & comedian)	Franco Mariotti	Eliminated 7th on 2 August 2021		
Débora Plager (Journalist & TV host)	Nicolás Villalba	Eliminated 8th on 9 August 2021		
Ariel Puchetta (Singer)	Sofía Cerruto	Eliminated 9th on 18 August 2021		
Ángela Leiva (Note: Ángela Leiva announced that she is withdrawing from the competition for personal and work reasons. In her place enters Noelia Marzol.) (Singer)	Jonathan Lazarte	Withdrew on 26 August 2021		
Mariela Anchipi (Dancer, choreographer & model)	Nicolás Schell	Eliminated 10th on 30 August 2021		
Sofía «Jujuy» Jiménez (TV host & model)	Ignacio Saraceni	Eliminated 11th on 10 September 2021		
Ezequiel «El Polaco» Cwirkaluk (Singer)	Bárbara Silenzi (Dancer & TV personality)	Eliminated 12th on 20 September 2021		
Florencia Vigna (Note: Florencia Vigna withdrew from the competition for personal reasons.) (Actress & TV host)	Facundo Mazzei (Note: Facundo Mazzei withdrew from the competition due to injury.) (Dancer & singer)	Withdrew on 27 September 2021		
Julieta Nair Calvo (Note: Julieta Nair Calvo withdrew the competition for pregnancy. In her place enters Rocío Igarzabal.) (Actress, singer & dancer)	Gonzalo Gerber	Withdrew on 27 September 2021		
Lionel Ferro (Youtuber, actor & singer)	Camila Lonigro	Eliminated 13th on 6 October 2021		
Luciana Salazar (Model, TV host & actress)	Jorge Moliniers (Dancer)	Withdrew on 18 October 2021		
Nazareno Móttola (Comedian, actor & acrobat)	Micaela Grimoldi	Eliminated 14th on 19 October 2021		
Karina «La Princesita» Tejeda (Singer)	Rafael Muñiz	Withdrew on 28 October 2021		
Rodrigo Tapari (Singer)	Sol Beatriz	Eliminated 15th on 29 October 2021		
Viviana Saccone (Actress)	Ernesto «Tito» Díaz	Eliminated 16th on 8 November 2021		
José María «Pachu» Peña (Comedian & actor)	Florencia Díaz	Eliminated 17th on 16 November 2021		
Rocío Marengo (TV personality & former vedette)	Ignacio Pérez Cortés	Eliminated 18th on 24 November 2021		
Lizardo Ponce (Journalist, TV host & influencer)	Josefina Oriozabala	Eliminated 19th on 24 November 2021		
Rocío «Rochi» Igarzabal (Actress & singer)	Gonzalo Gerber	Eliminated 20th on 1 December 2021		
Mario Guerci (Model & actor)	Soledad Bayona	Eliminated 21st on 7 December 2021		
Agustín Barajas (Dancer, choreographer & actor)	Loana Ruiz	Eliminated 22nd on 7 December 2021		
Celeste Muriega (Dancer & vedette)	Maximiliano Diorio	Semi-finalists on 8 December 2021		
Candela Ruggeri (Model & entrepreneurship)	Nicolás Fleitas	Semi-finalists on 9 December 2021		
Agustín «Cachete» Sierra (Actor)	Fiorella Giménez	Runners-up on 10 December 2021		
Noelia Marzol (Actress & dancer)	Jonathan Lazarte	Winners on 10 December 2021		

- In quotation marks («»), the nicknames.

==== Choreographers ====
Alphabetical order

See
Choreographer	Assigned couple	Status
Antonella Campaniello	Bárbara Franco & Gabriel Rentería	Eliminated
Antonella Campaniello	Mariela Anchipi & Nicolás Schell (Note: Returned in round 10, with a new team.)	Eliminated
Antonella Campaniello	Lionel Ferro & Camila Lonigro	Eliminated
Bárbara Majule	Romina Ricci & Juan Manuel Palao	Eliminated
Carla Lanzi	Sofía Jiménez & Ignacio Saraceni	Eliminated
Cecilia Estévez	Mar Tarrés & Franco Mariotti	Eliminated
Emir Abdul Gani	Karina Tejeda & Rafael Muñiz (in rounds 1–3)	Withdrew (Note: Emir Abdul Gani withdrew from the competition for work reasons. In his place, Facundo Arrigoni (former professional of the show) entered, as the new choreographer of Karina Tejeda & Rafael Muñiz.)
Enrique Pérez	Ezequiel Cwirkaluk & Bárbara Silenzi (in rounds 1–12)	Withdrew (Note: Enrique Pérez withdraws from the competition for personal reasons (and internal team problems). In his place, Georgina Seva (former choreographer) enters, as the new choreographer of Ezequiel Cwirkaluk & Bárbara Silenzi.)
Esteban Toppi	Ulises Bueno & Rocío Pardo	Not applicable
Esteban Toppi	Ariel Puchetta & Sofía Cerruto	Eliminated
Facundo Arrigoni	Karina Tejeda & Rafael Muñiz	Not applicable
Franco Quiles	Nazareno Móttola & Micaela Grimoldi	Eliminated
Gabriel Conti	Pablo Prada & Lourdes Sánchez	Not applicable
Georgina Seva	Julieta Puente & Facundo Insúa	Eliminated
Georgina Seva	Ezequiel Cwirkaluk & Bárbara Silenzi	Eliminated
Georgina Tirotta	Florencia Vigna & Facundo Mazzei	Not applicable
Hernán Alegre	Julieta Nair Calvo & Gonzalo Gerber	Not applicable
Hernán Alegre	Rocío Igarzábal & Gonzalo Gerber	Eliminated
Judith Kovalovsky	Mar Tarrés & Franco Mariotti (in rounds 1–4) (Note: Due to her celebrity requesting a choreographer change due to internal team problems, she was disqualified from the competition.)	Disqualified
Judith Kovalovsky	Lionel Ferro & Camila Lonigro (in rounds 10–12)	Withdrew (Note: Judith Kovalovsky withdrew from the competition for personal and work reasons. In her place, Antonella Campaniello (former choreographer) entered, as the new choreographer of Lionel Ferro & Camila Lonigro.)
Lorena Portillo	Viviana Saccone & Ernesto Díaz	Eliminated
Marcelo Amante	Mario Guerci & Soledad Bayona	Eliminated
María José de la Iglesia	Luciana Salazar & Jorge Moliniers	Not applicable
María Laura Cattalini	Ángela Leiva & Jonathan Lazarte	Not applicable
María Laura Cattalini	Noelia Marzol & Jonathan Lazarte	Winner
Mariano Florido	Gustavo Parisi & Melody Luz Stocchetti	Eliminated
Mariano Florido	Rodrigo Tapari & Sol Beatriz	Eliminated
Matías Napp	Agustín Sierra & Fiorella Giménez	Runner-up
Matías Ramos	Candela Ruggeri & Nicolás Fleitas	Semi-finalist
Nahuel Leguizamón	Lizardo Ponce & Josefina Oriozabala	Eliminated
Paola García	Débora Plager & Nicolás Villalba	Eliminated
Paola García	Agustín Barajas & Loana Ruiz	Eliminated
Rodrigo Vallejos	Mariana Genesio Peña & Rodrigo Jara	Not applicable
Sergio Cabrera	José María Peña & Florencia Díaz	Eliminated
Vera Mauer	Charlotte Caniggia & Ignacio Gonatta	Eliminated
Vera Mauer	Celeste Muriega & Maximiliano Diorio	Semi-finalist
Verónica Pecollo	Rocío Marengo & Ignacio Pérez Cortés	Eliminated

=== Judges ===
The panel of judges will be made up of four personalities associated with the world of dance, theatre, acting, singing, modelling and television. Two of them return from the previous edition: de Brito and Ardohaín. Barón and Piquín joined the panel as a new judges. The two new judges have competed in previous editions.

- Ángel de Brito (Journalist & TV and radio host)
- Carolina «Pampita» Ardohaín (Model, TV host, actress & former dancer)
- Jimena Barón (Actress & singer-songwriter) —she was a participant in seventh edition and thirteenth edition; in the latter finished in second place—
- Hernán Piquín (Dancer) —he was the first two-time champion of the show, won seventh edition and eighth edition. It was also finalist in the ninth edition. In addition participated in the fourteenth edition even though, for personal and work reasons, he withdrew from the competition in the round 7—

After eight seasons, Marcelo Polino did not return this season as a judge.

== Scoring chart ==
Celebrity(-ies)	1	2	3	4	5	6	7	8	9	10	11	12	13	14	15	16	17	18	19	20	21	22	SF		F
Celebrity(-ies)	1	2	3	4	5	6	7	8	9	10	11	12	13	14	15	16	17	18	19	20	21	22	1	2	F
Noelia	was not											41	49	A	30	49	48	47	50	43	39	50	4	—	5
Agustín S.	35	22	37	38	32	30	26	A	50	49	50	27	47	A	34	49	43	48	35	33	45	29	—	3	1
Candela	35	34	25	33	26	36	16	A	28	38	33	40	46	A	40	41	39	45	37	33	49	30	—	1	
Celeste	was not									41	49	39	47	A	50	43	32	46	35	49	44	33	0		
Agustín B.	was not														42	41	37	37	33	37	39	33			
Mario	27	21	18	15	17	31	25	A	44	20	39	41	34	A	33	47	35	36	21	40	21	30			
Rocío I.	was not															46	48	36	27	40	30				
Lizardo	24	22	18	33	16	23	24	A	38	30	40	32	41	A	23	39	39	42	31	27					
Rocío M.	26	28	27	29	18	26	10	A	34	22	31	33	43	A	47	43	30	43	35	33					
José María	20	29	9	14	21	24	25	A	19	31	42	36	13	A	25	48	37	35	21						
Viviana	30	25	21	25	34	25	12	A	19	38	40	38	47	A	39	46	43	34							
Rodrigo	was not									44	39	40	37	A	41	50	35								
Karina	27	37	21	15	24	23	35	A	25	40	35	33	38	A	43	47	28								
Nazareno	was not														24	39									
Luciana & Jorge	24	23	22	21	19	25	32	A	39	31	36	25	28	A	35	33									
Lionel	was not									46	29	29	24	A	25										
Julieta Nair	35	29	25	36	25	40	33	A	36	39	42	47	37	A	44										
Florencia & Facundo	33	37	26	36	31	38	25	A	37	44	47	45	47	A											
Ezequiel & Bárbara S.	23	18	18	21	20	23	28	A	23	34	44	31	26												
Sofía	26	16	28	22	21	28	17	A	27	20	44	25													
Mariela	was not									32	31														
Ángela	23	35	25	32	26	25	35	A	26	42	36														
Ariel	was not									23															
Débora	24	26	14	27	16	16	28	A	20																
Mar	24	28	16	24	20	19	22	A																	
Bárbara F.	32	18	27	20	33	29	16																		
Mariana	31	18	22	32	17	23																			
Romina	27	31	19	21	17																				
Gustavo	22	26	20	14																					
Charlotte	20	16	12																						
Julieta P.	35	15																							
Ulises & Rocío P.	27	27																							
Pablo & Lourdes	20	—																							
Minimum score to be safe	24	19	15	21	19	24	17	—	24	24	34	30	27	—	42	36	37	32	38	40	34	—			

Italics numbers indicate the partial scores; without the secret vote
Blue numbers indicate the lowest score for each style
Green numbers indicate the highest score for each style
"—" indicates the couple did not dance that round
"A": All couples are sent to duel

Rounds 1–7 and 9-final
the couple sentenced
the couple saved by the judges
the couple saved by the audience
the couple saved by the production
the couple eliminated in that round
the couple withdrew from the competition
the winning couple
the runner-up couple
the semi-finalists couples

Round 8
In this round, the judges choose one of the two facing couples. Initially, the couple with the most votes wins and advances to the next round; the other remaining couple continues into the next face-off. So on until the bottom two are left in the last face-off, the couple with the fewest votes is eliminated.
the couple was saved in the first duel
the couple was saved in the second duel
the couple was saved in the third duel
the couple was saved in the fourth duel

== Rounds ==
Individual judges' scores in the charts below (given in parentheses) are listed in this order from left to right: Ángel de Brito, Carolina Ardohain, Guillermina Valdés, Jimena Barón, Hernán Piquín.

=== Round 1: Double cube ===
Individual judges' scores in the charts below (given in parentheses) are listed in this order from left to right: Carolina Ardohain, Jimena Barón, Guillermina Valdés, Hernán Piquín.

The couples will perform a choreography with one element: two cubes (where they will have to dance inside and on them). This dance will combine synchronization dance with acrobatics. The couples will have to use the two cubes, freely. But they have to comply with a fundamental rule: dance in sync, each one in each cube and without seeing each other, for a period of 15 seconds. In addition, the couple together with their coach are in charge of choosing the song and the images on the screens.

On 10 May, it is confirmed that Ángel de Brito will be replaced in the first broadcasts of the program because he tested positive for COVID-19. the model and businesswoman Guillermina Valdés will be the substitute judge; while de Brito recovers. de Brito returned on 27 June, for the duel and the elimination of the first round (Valdés was also a participant in this process; so there were 5 judges instead of 4).

In the duel of this round, there were 5 judges: Ángel de Brito joined and Guillermina Valdes occupied the role of guest judge. In this round, the choreographers chief was not considered for the definition of the eliminated couple (since it was impossible for there to be a tie between the judges).

Running order

Song and scores
Date	Couple	Song	Scores
18 May	Agustín Sierra & Fiorella Giménez	«Thrift Shop» (Macklemore & Ryan Lewis feat. Wanz)	35 (10, 8, 10, 7)
18 May	Julieta Nair Calvo & Gonzalo Gerber	Mix: «Jai Ho!» (A. R. Rahman & The Pussycat Dolls feat. Nicole Scherzinger) «Rave de Favela» (Major Lazer, MC Lan & Anitta feat. Beam)	35 (10, 9, 10, 6)
18 May	Mar Tarrés & Franco Mariotti	Mix: «Girl Like Me» (Black Eyed Peas & Shakira) «Destination Calabria» (Alex Gaudino feat. Crystal Waters) «Fireball» (Pitbull feat. John Ryan)	24 (6, 5, 7, 6)
18 May	Romina Ricci & Juan Manuel Palao	«Bang Bang» (Jessie J, Ariana Grande & Nicki Minaj)	27 (7, 5, 8, 7)
19 May	Florencia Vigna & Facundo Mazzei	Mix: «Do You?» (TroyBoi) «Jenny from the Block» (Jennifer Lopez feat. Jadakiss & Styles) «Back in Black» (AC/DC) «Drunk in Love» (Beyoncé feat. Jay-Z) «When I Grow Up» (The Pussycat Dolls)	33 (10, 6, 10, 7)
19 May	Ezequiel Cwirkaluk & Bárbara Silenzi	Mix: «Boom» (Tiësto & Sevenn) «Another One Bites the Dust» (Queen)	23 (7, 6, 7, 3)
19 May	Viviana Saccone & Ernesto Díaz	«Don't Start Now» (Dua Lipa)	30 (8, 7, 10, 5)
19 May	Sofía Jiménez & Ignacio Saraceni	Mix: «Get Right» (Jennifer Lopez) «On the Floor» (Jennifer Lopez feat. Pitbull)	26 (9, 6, 7, 4)
19 May	Mario Guerci & Soledad Bayona	Mashup: «Sax» (Fleur East) «Uptown Funk» (Mark Ronson feat. Bruno Mars)	27 (8, 6, 8, 5)
20 May	Ulises Bueno & Rocío Pardo	Mix: «The Drill (Dance Sequence)» (Michael Jackson) «Backstage Romance: Seven Nation Army and Toxic» (from Moulin Rouge! The Musical)	27 (8, 6, 8, 5)
20 May	José María Peña & Florencia Díaz	«Barbie Girl» (Aqua)	20 (5, 3, 9, 3)
20 May	Lizardo Ponce & Josefina Oriozabala	«Prisoner» (Miley Cyrus feat. Dua Lipa)	24 (8, 5, 7, 4)
20 May	Rocío Marengo & Ignacio Pérez Cortés	Mix: «I Like It Like That» (Pete Rodriguez) «I Like It» (Cardi B, Bad Bunny & J Balvin)	26 (8, 6, 8, 4)
24 May	Karina Tejeda & Rafael Muñiz	Mix: «S&M» / «Rude Boy» / «Where Have You Been» / «Diamonds» (Rihanna)	27 (8, 6, 8, 5)
24 May	Débora Plager & Nicolás Villalba	«Swish Swish» (Katy Perry feat. Nicki Minaj)	24 (6, 5, 7, 6)
24 May	Gustavo Parisi & Melody Luz Stocchetti	Mix: «Perm» (Bruno Mars) «Billie Jean» (Michael Jackson)	22 (7, 5, 6, 4)
24 May	Ángela Leiva & Jonathan Lazarte	«Battle Without Honor or Humanity» (Tomoyasu Hotei); Mashup: «Blinding Lights» (the Weeknd) «Physical» (Dua Lipa)	23 (5, 5, 7, 6)
25 May	Charlotte Caniggia & Ignacio Gonatta	Mix: «Wonder Woman Theme» (The New South Bay Orchestra) «Run the World (Girls)» (Beyoncé) «Secrets» (Tiësto & KSHMR feat. Vassy)	20 (5, 4, 6, 5)
25 May	Luciana Salazar & Jorge Moliniers	«Levitating» (Dua Lipa)	24 (7, 5, 8, 4)
25 May	Mariana Genesio Peña & Rodrigo Jara	«Rain on Me» (Lady Gaga & Ariana Grande)	31 (7, 8, 9, 7)
25 May	Bárbara Franco & Gabriel Rentería	Mix: «Super Mario Bros. theme» (Koji Kondo) «Electricity» (Silk City & Dua Lipa) «My Head & My Heart» (Ava Max) «We Found Love» (Rihanna feat. Calvin Harris)	32 (10, 7, 9, 6)
25 May	Julieta Puente & Facundo Insúa	«Que Calor» (Major Lazer feat. J Balvin & El Alfa)	35 (10, 8, 10, 7)
26 May	Pablo Prada & Lourdes Sánchez	Mix: «Miénteme» (Tini & María Becerra) «Old Time Rock and Roll» (Bob Seger) «Take On Me» (A-ha)	20 (5, 5, 7, 3)
26 May	Candela Ruggeri & Nicolás Fleitas (Note: Nicolas Fleitas, professional Candela Ruggeri's, tested COVID-19 positive. Although both Ruggeri and her choreographer, Matías Ramos, tested negative. Even so, Ruggeri and Ramos were isolated out of caution as indicated by the health protocol. After the 10 days of isolation, Ruggeri and Ramos returned to rehearsal but without Fleitas, who was replaced by Facundo Giordano. Finally, after receiving the epidemiological discharge and be in good health, Fleitas will dance.)	«Ritmo» (Black Eyed Peas & J Balvin)	35 (10, 8, 10, 7)

The duel
Date	Couple	Act	Result
27 May	Ezequiel Cwirkaluk & Bárbara Silenzi	Cwirkaluk sang live a mix of his songs; to make such a mix, he used a piano. Silenzi danced to the rhythm of the music (dance style: Argentine cumbia). Songs Mix: «En este mundo» / «Sola otra vez» / «Deja de llorar» (Ezequiel Cwirkaluk)	Bottom two (Last to be called safe)
27 May	José María Peña & Florencia Díaz	Peña along with his professional Díaz, acted (In addition to performing dance sequences). Where he alluded to his participation as a contestant on the "Corte y confección Famosos" program, recalling his extravagant dress (designed by himself) inspired by the song "Un beso y una flor" by the singer Nino Bravo. Song «Un beso y una flor» (Nino Bravo)	4th couple saved
27 May	Gustavo Parisi & Melody Luz Stocchetti	Parisi and Stocchetti sang (and performed some dance sequences) a parody of the song "La guitarra" from their band Los Auténticos Decadentes; relating in a comical way his experience in "La Academia". Song «La guitarra» (Los Auténticos Decadentes)	Eliminated
27 May	Ángela Leiva & Jonathan Lazarte	Leiva sang some fragments of the song "Sobreviviré" by the Spanish singer Pitingo. She also, together with her professional partner, performed a dance routine combining flamenco and paso doble. Song «Sobreviviré» (Pitingo)	1st couple saved
27 May	Charlotte Caniggia & Ignacio Gonatta	Caniggia and Gonatta performed a striptease; inspired by Fifty Shades of Grey. Songs Mix: «Earned It» (The Weeknd) «High» (Whethan & Dua Lipa)	2nd couple saved
27 May	Pablo Prada & Lourdes Sánchez	Prada and Sánchez performed a children's show, inspired by El universo de Lourdes. Sánchez sang "Golosinas" and Prada acted as "Payaso Papelón". Song «Golosinas» (Lourdes Sánchez)	3rd couple saved
Judges' votes to save (Bottom two): de Brito: Ezequiel Cwirkaluk & Bárbara Silenzi; Valdés: Ezequiel Cwirkaluk & Bárbara Silenzi; Piquín: Ezequiel Cwirkaluk & Bárbara Silenzi; Barón: Ezequiel Cwirkaluk & Bárbara Silenzi; Ardohain: Ezequiel Cwirkaluk & Bárbara Silenzi; Result Ezequiel Cwirkaluk & Bárbara Silenzi (5 votes) Gustavo Parisi & Melody Luz Stocchetti (0 votes)

Blue numbers indicate the lowest score
Green numbers indicate the highest score
Sentenced
Saved by the judges
Eliminated

=== Round 2: "Perfect imitation" ===
Individual judges' scores in the charts below (given in parentheses) are listed in this order from left to right: Ángel de Brito, Carolina Ardohain, Jimena Barón, Hernán Piquín.

The contestants must be characterized as a specific singer and perform one (or more) of their songs, imitating the original singer in question as best as possible, both in movements and voice. As the voices of the contestants imitating the singers were previously recorded, the judges must evaluate the lip sync (among other things).

The teams, if they wish, can add another professional dancer to accompany the performance.

Running order

Song and scores
Date	Couple	Song	Scores
27 May	Agustín Sierra & Fiorella Giménez	«La parte de adelante» (Andrés Calamaro)	22 (4, 5, 7, 6)
27 May	Rocío Marengo & Ignacio Pérez Cortés	Mix: «Hay que venir al sur» / «0303456» / «Fiesta» (Raffaella Carrà)	28 (6, 7, 8, 7)
31 May	Débora Plager & Nicolás Villalba	Mix: «Your Song» / «I'm Still Standing» (Elton John)	26 (5, 7, 7, 7)
31 May	Ulises Bueno & Rocío Pardo	«19 días y 500 noches» (Joaquín Sabina)	27 (6, 8, 6, 7)
31 May	Sofía Jiménez & Ignacio Saraceni	Mix: «Con Altura» / «Malamente» (Rosalía)	16 (3, 4, 4, 5)
31 May	Mar Tarrés & Franco Mariotti	«¿A quién le importa?» (Thalía)	28 (10, 6, 6, 6)
31 May	Mario Guerci & Soledad Bayona	Mix: «She Bangs» / «Livin' la Vida Loca» (Ricky Martin)	21 (3, 5, 7, 6)
1 June	Florencia Vigna & Facundo Mazzei	Mix: «I'm a Slave 4 U» / «Toxic» / «Oops!... I Did It Again» / «...Baby One More Time» / «(You Drive Me) Crazy» (Britney Spears)	37 (10, 10, 8, 9)
1 June	Romina Ricci & Juan Manuel Palao	«A rodar mi vida» (Fito Páez)	31 (6, 10, 8, 7)
1 June	José María Peña & Florencia Díaz	«Sex Bomb» (Tom Jones)	29 (7, 8, 7, 7)
1 June	Lizardo Ponce & Josefina Oriozabala	Mix: «Bulería» / «Hasta el final» / «Ave María» (David Bisbal)	22 (3, 7, 6, 6)
1 June	Viviana Saccone & Ernesto Díaz	«Todos Me Miran» (Gloria Trevi)	25 (4, 6, 8, 7)
2 June	Pablo Prada & Lourdes Sánchez	They withdraw from the competition for personal reasons.	
2 June	Julieta Nair Calvo & Gonzalo Gerber	Mix: «Jenny from the Block» / «El Anillo» / «Let's Get Loud» (Jennifer Lopez)	29 (7, 9, 7, 6)
2 June	Karina Tejeda & Rafael Muñiz	«Marinero de luces» (Isabel Pantoja)	37 (10, 10, 9, 8)
2 June	Mariana Genesio Peña & Rodrigo Jara	Mix: «Like a Virgin» / «4 Minutes» / «Vogue» (Madonna)	18 (4, 5, 5, 4)
2 June	Ezequiel Cwirkaluk & Bárbara Silenzi	«Valió la pena» (Marc Anthony)	18 (3, 5, 6, 4)
2 June	Candela Ruggeri & Nicolás Fleitas	Mix: «Inevitable» / «Ojos así» / «Hips Don't Lie» (Shakira)	34 (8, 9, 10, 7)
7 June	Charlotte Caniggia & Ignacio Gonatta	«Rehab» (Amy Winehouse)	16 (6, 0, 5, 5)
7 June	Luciana Salazar & Jorge Moliniers	Mix: «Can't Get You Out of My Head» / «Slow» / «The Loco-Motion» (Kylie Minogue)	23 (6, 6, 6, 5)
7 June	Julieta Puente & Facundo Insúa	Mix: «Cuidado con la bombachita» / «Qué tendrá el petiso» (Ricky Maravilla)	15 (3, 5, 4, 3)
9 June	Gustavo Parisi & Melody Luz Stocchetti	«Beso a beso» (La Mona Jiménez)	26 (8, 6, 6, 6)
9 June	Bárbara Franco & Gabriel Rentería	Mix: «Telephone» / «Poker Face» (Lady Gaga)	18 (1, 10, 5, 2)
9 June	Ángela Leiva & Jonathan Lazarte	Mix: «Beautiful» / «Genie in a Bottle» / «Ain't No Other Man» (Christina Aguilera)	35 (10, 8, 10, 7)

The duel
Date	Couple	Act	Result
10 June	Sofía Jiménez & Facundo Giordano (Note: In replacement of Ignacio Saraceni (who tested positive for COVID-19). Both Jiménez and Carla Lanzi (choreographer) tested negative, and as a precaution fulfilled isolation. So most of her rehearsals with Giordano were via videotelephony.)	"Top fashion show": Fusion modeling with dance (hip-hop). Song «Finesse» (Bruno Mars feat. Cardi B)	Bottom two (Last to be called safe)
10 June	Mariana Genesio Peña & Rodrigo Jara	performance burlesque: "Undress your soul and your body". She made, at the beginning of the choreography, a monologue referring to her childhood and her inspiration Marilyn Monroe. Song «Sparkling Diamonds» (from Moulin Rouge)	2nd couple saved
10 June	Ezequiel Cwirkaluk & Bárbara Silenzi	They danced reggaeton. Song «Problema» (Daddy Yankee)	3rd couple saved
10 June	Julieta Puente & Facundo Insúa	They performed acrobatics and dance. Song «Boom, Boom, Boom, Boom!!» (Vengaboys)	Eliminated
10 June	Charlotte Caniggia & Ignacio Gonatta	"Girls nights". They made lip sync (their singing voices were previously recorded). Song «Man! I Feel Like a Woman!» (Shania Twain)	4th couple saved (Note: To save the fourth couple, there was a tie between the judges, so that Eugenia López Frugoni (choreographers chief) gave the decisive vote.)
10 June	Bárbara Franco & Gabriel Rentería	They performed acrobatics (with a cuerda Indiana) and dance. Song «Already» (Beyoncé, Shatta Wale & Major Lazer)	1st couple saved
Judges' votes to save (Bottom two): Barón: Julieta Puente & Facundo Insúa; Piquín: Sofía Jiménez & Facundo Giordano; de Brito: Sofía Jiménez & Facundo Giordano; Ardohain: Julieta Puente & Facundo Insúa; Rossi and Frugoni: Sofía Jiménez & Facundo Giordano; Result Julieta Puente & Facundo Insúa (2 votes) Sofía Jiménez & Facundo Giordano (3 votes)

Blue numbers indicate the lowest score
Green numbers indicate the highest score

Sentenced
Saved by the judges
Eliminated
Withdrew

=== Round 3: Shuffle dance ===
The couples will perform this dance with four guest dancers.

Running order

Song and scores
Date	Couple	Song	Scores
10 June	Candela Ruggeri & Nicolás Fleitas	«Only Girl (In the World)» (Rihanna)	25 (5, 8, 8, 4)
14 June	Florencia Vigna & Facundo Mazzei	Mix: «Lose Control» (Missy Elliott feat. Ciara and Fatman Scoop) «Level Up» (Ciara)	26 (6, 9, 7, 4)
14 June	Débora Plager & Nicolás Villalba	«Gonna Make You Sweat (Everybody Dance Now)» (C+C Music Factory feat. Martha Wash & Freedom Williams)	14 (3, 5, 3, 3)
14 June	José María Peña & Florencia Díaz	«Sexy and I Know It» (LMFAO)	9 (1, 4, 2, 2)
14 June	Romina Ricci & Juan Manuel Palao	«Wannabe» (Spice Girls)	19 (4, 7, 5, 3)
14 June	Lizardo Ponce & Josefina Oriozabala	«Peaches» (Justin Bieber feat. Daniel Caesar & Giveon)	18 (3, 6, 6, 3)
15 June	Karina Tejeda & Rafael Muñiz	Mix: «They Don't Care About Us» (Michael Jackson) «Abusadamente» (MC Gustta & MC DG)	21 (3, 7, 6, 5)
15 June	Agustín Sierra & Fiorella Giménez	«Hit the Road Jack» (Throttle)	37 (10, 10, 10, 7)
15 June	Rocío Marengo & Ignacio Pérez Cortés	«Party Rock Anthem» (LMFAO feat. Lauren Bennett & GoonRock)	27 (6, 8, 7, 6)
15 June	Ángela Leiva & Jonathan Lazarte	«A Little Party Never Killed Nobody (All We Got)» (Fergie, Q-Tip & GoonRock)	25 (4, 8, 7, 6)
16 June	Charlotte Caniggia & Ignacio Gonatta	«Umbrella» (Rihanna feat. Jay-Z)	12 (2, 3, 3, 4)
16 June	Julieta Nair Calvo & Gonzalo Gerber	«Pump Up the Jam» (Technotronic feat. Ya Kid K)	25 (6, 7, 6, 6)
16 June	Mariana Genesio Peña & Rodrigo Jara	«Eye of the Tiger» (Survivor)	22 (5, 7, 5, 5)
16 June	Sofía Jiménez & Facundo Giordano (Note: In replacement of Ignacio Saraceni (who is recovering from COVID-19).)	«U Can't Touch This» (MC Hammer)	28 (6, 9, 7, 6)
17 June	Ezequiel Cwirkaluk & Bárbara Silenzi	«Alo Michael (Ay rico, rico, rico)» (Los dioses del ritmo)	18 (4, 6, 4, 4)
17 June	Luciana Salazar & Jorge Moliniers	«Lose Control» (Meduza, Becky Hill & Goodboys)	22 (5, 6, 6, 5)
17 June	Viviana Saccone & Ernesto Díaz	«Turn Up the Music» (Chris Brown)	21 (4, 6, 6, 5)
17 June	Bárbara Franco & Gabriel Rentería	«Dance Monkey» (Tones and I)	27 (6, 7, 8, 6)
22 June	Mar Tarrés & Franco Mariotti	«Bon, Bon» (Pitbull)	16 (2, 5, 5, 4)
22 June	Gustavo Parisi & Melody Luz Stocchetti	Mix: «Bongo Cha Cha Cha» (Goodboys) «Better» (Valentino Khan & Wuki feat. Roxanna) «Rasputin» (Majestic & Boney M.)	20 (4, 5, 6, 5)
22 June	Mario Guerci & Soledad Bayona	«Boom Boom Pow» (The Black Eyed Peas)	18 (2, 7, 5, 4)

The duel
Date	Couple	Act	Result
23 June	Débora Plager & Nicolás Villalba	They made a presentation titled "musical report" (merged her journalism profession with dance and acting). Song «We Both Reached for the Gun (Karaoke Version)» (from Chicago)	Bottom two (55.4%)
23 June	José María Peña & Florencia Díaz	They made a presentation (singing and dancing) with tango thematic. Peña sang the song "Zorro gris" with his own lyrics (adding humor to the presentation). They titled this presentation "Naranjo en Flor Díaz", alluding to the tango song "Naranjo en flor". Song Mix: «Oro y plata» (from Forever Tango) «Zorro gris» (La Tubatango)	1st (and only) couple saved
23 June	Charlotte Caniggia & Ignacio Gonatta	They performed a singing performance. Song «Barbie Girl» (Aqua)	Eliminated (44.6%)

Blue numbers indicate the lowest score
Green numbers indicate the highest score

Sentenced
Saved by the judges
Saved by the audience
Eliminated

=== Round 4: Disco ===
Running order

Song and scores
Date	Couple	Song	Scores
23 June	Florencia Vigna & Facundo Mazzei	Mashup: «Lovin' Is Really My Game» (Brainstorm) «Qué nivel de mujer» (Luis Miguel)	36 (9, 10, 10, 7)
23 June	Rocío Marengo & Ignacio Pérez Cortés	Mix: «Gimme! Gimme! Gimme! (A Man After Midnight)» / «Voulez-Vous» (ABBA)	29 (8, 8, 7, 6)
24 June	Agustín Sierra & Fiorella Giménez	«Don't Stop 'Til You Get Enough» (Michael Jackson)	38 (10, 10, 10, 8)
24 June	Candela Ruggeri & Nicolás Fleitas	«Treasure» (Bruno Mars)	33 (9, 9, 8, 7)
24 June	Bárbara Franco & Gabriel Rentería	«Blame It on the Boogie» (The Jackson 5)	20 (4, 7, 5, 4)
24 June	Julieta Nair Calvo & Gonzalo Gerber	Mix: «Get Up Offa That Thing» (James Brown) «Sex Machine» (from Legally Blonde)	36 (10, 9, 9, 8)
28 June	The program will not be broadcast due to the match Argentina v Bolivia of the 2021 Copa América.		
29 June	Karina Tejeda & Rafael Muñiz	«Giant» (Calvin Harris & Rag'n'Bone Man)	15 (2, 5, 5, 3)
29 June	Viviana Saccone & Ernesto Díaz	«Cosmic Girl» (Jamiroquai)	25 (7, 7, 6, 5)
29 June	José María Peña & Florencia Díaz	«Let's Groove» (Earth, Wind & Fire)	14 (2, 6, 4, 2)
30 June	Ángela Leiva & Jonathan Lazarte	Mashup: «Long Train Runnin'» (The Doobie Brothers) «Get Lucky» (Daft Punk feat. Pharrell Williams & Nile Rodgers)	32 (10, 8, 8, 6)
30 June	Sofía Jiménez & Ignacio Saraceni	«One Kiss» (Calvin Harris & Dua Lipa)	22 (5, 6, 6, 5)
30 June	Mar Tarrés & Franco Mariotti	Mix: «Seven Nation Army» (The White Stripes) «You Make Me Feel (Mighty Real)» (Sylvester)	24 (6, 6, 8, 4)
1 July	Rodrigo Tapari (Note: In replacement of Ezequiel Cwirkaluk (who was absent for personal reasons).) & Bárbara Silenzi	Mashup: «24K Magic» (Bruno Mars) «Get Down on It» (Kool & the Gang)	21 (4, 6, 7, 4)
1 July	Débora Plager & Nicolás Villalba	«Heart of Glass» (Miley Cyrus)	27 (10, 6, 6, 5)
1 July	Mariana Genesio Peña & Rodrigo Jara	Mashup: «Survivor» / «I Will Survive» (from Glee)	32 (10, 8, 8, 6)
1 July	Lizardo Ponce & Josefina Oriozabala	«Hot Stuff» (Kygo & Donna Summer)	33 (8, 10, 9, 6)
2 July (Special transmission)	Luciana Salazar & Jorge Moliniers	Mashup: «Say So» / «Like That» (Doja Cat)	21 (5, 6, 6, 4)
2 July (Special transmission)	Romina Ricci & Juan Manuel Palao	«Flashdance... What a Feeling» (Irene Cara)	21 (5, 7, 5, 4)
2 July (Special transmission)	Gustavo Parisi & Melody Luz Stocchetti	«September» (Earth, Wind & Fire)	14 (1, 5, 4, 4)
2 July (Special transmission)	Mario Guerci & Soledad Bayona	«Juice» (Lizzo)	15 (3, 5, 5, 2)

The duel
Date	Couple	Act	Result
5 July	Bárbara Franco & Gabriel Rentería	They danced argentine cumbia. His presentation had as guests: Fernando Burlando (lawyer, former participant of tenth season & boyfriend of Bárbara Franco) who acted as "bartender", Francisco Piperatta (physical trainer) who acted as "security" and the Ráfaga's singer, Ariel Pucheta, who sang live. Song «Una cerveza» (Ráfaga)	1st couple saved
5 July	Karina Tejeda & Rafael Muñiz	Their performance was a combination of singing, dancing, and acting. Songs «Fuera» (Karina Tejeda) «Naughty Girl» (Beyoncé)	3rd couple saved (Note: To save the third couple, there was a tie between the judges, so that María Laura Rossi and Eugenia López Frugoni (choreographers chiefs) gave the decisive vote.)
5 July	José María Peña & Florencia Díaz	They made a presentation titled "Salchacha picante", where they combine various latin dances. They also added humor to the presentation, "playing" with the lyrics of the song "¡Ay, José!". Songs «¡Ay, José!» (Graciela & Machito Orchestra) «Cachondea» (Fruko y sus Tesos)	2nd couple saved
5 July	Gustavo Parisi & Melody Luz Stocchetti	They performed a danced. Song «Todos con el celu» (Lοuta)	Eliminated
5 July	Mario Guerci & Soledad Bayona	They performed a danced. He for this presentation use roller skates. Song «Surfin' U.S.A.» (The Beach Boys)	Bottom two (Last to be called safe)
Judges' votes to save (Bottom two): Piquín: Mario Guerci & Soledad Bayona; Ardohain: Mario Guerci & Soledad Bayona; de Brito: Mario Guerci & Soledad Bayona; Barón: Mario Guerci & Soledad Bayona; Result Gustavo Parisi & Melody Luz Stocchetti (0 votes) Mario Guerci & Soledad Bayona (4 votes)

Blue numbers indicate the lowest score
Green numbers indicate the highest score

Sentenced
Saved by the judges
Eliminated

=== Round 5: Ballroom samba ===
Running order

Song and scores
Date (Note: As of this round, the program it will also be issued on Fridays.)	Couple	Song	Scores
5 July	Julieta Nair Calvo & Gonzalo Gerber	«Mi gente» (J Balvin & Willy William)	25 (7, 6, 7, 5)
7 July	Viviana Saccone & Ernesto Díaz	«Mas que nada» (Sérgio Mendes feat. Black Eyed Peas)	34 (10, 9, 8, 7)
7 July	Ángela Leiva & Jonathan Lazarte	Mashup: «Rumba (Sambal Badjak Mix)» (Armand van Helden) «Loco» (Anitta)	26 (7, 8, 6, 5)
7 July	Rocío Marengo & Ignacio Pérez Cortés	«Despacito» (Luis Fonsi feat. Daddy Yankee & Justin Bieber)	18 (4, 5, 5, 4)
8 July	Florencia Vigna & Facundo Mazzei	«L-Gante RKT» (L-Gante feat. Papu DJ)	31 (10, 8, 9, 4)
8 July	Candela Ruggeri & Nicolás Fleitas	«Fireball» (Pitbull feat. John Ryan)	26 (8, 7, 6, 5)
8 July	Débora Plager & Nicolás Villalba	«Hey Mama» (Black Eyed Peas)	16 (4, 5, 4, 3)
8 July	Mariela Anchipi (Note: In replacement of Sofía Jiménez (who could not dance due to injury).) & Ignacio Saraceni	«Watch Out for This (Bumaye)» (Major Lazer feat. Busy Signal, The Flexican & FS Green)	21 (4, 6, 7, 4)
8 July	Mario Guerci & Soledad Bayona	«La bomba» (Ricky Martin)	17 (4, 5, 5, 3)
9 July	Karina Tejeda & Rafael Muñiz	Mix: «Magalenha» (Sérgio Mendes feat. Carlinhos Brown) «Single Ladies (Put a Ring on It)» (Beyoncé)	24 (7, 5, 7, 5)
9 July	Mariana Genesio Peña & Rodrigo Jara	«Jazz Machine» (Black Machine)	17 (4, 4, 5, 4)
9 July	José María Peña & Florencia Díaz	«Más macarena» (Los del Río feat. Gente de Zona)	21 (8, 5, 5, 3)
9 July	Bárbara Franco & Gabriel Rentería	«Taki Taki» (AnTi prod. feat. Avera & DJ Maksy)	33 (8, 10, 9, 6)
12 July	Agustín Sierra & Fiorella Giménez	«Caliente» (Lali Espósito feat. Pabllo Vittar)	32 (10, 9, 7, 6)
12 July	Luciana Salazar & Jorge Moliniers	«Shape of You» (Ed Sheeran)	19 (6, 4, 5, 4)
13 July	Ezequiel Cwirkaluk & Bárbara Silenzi	«Baila conmigo» (Dayvi & Víctor Cárdenas feat. Kelly Ruiz)	20 (5, 5, 6, 4)
13 July	Mar Tarrés & Franco Mariotti	«Qué Rico Fuera» (Ricky Martin & Paloma Mami)	20 (5, 4, 6, 5)
13 July	Romina Ricci & Juan Manuel Palao	«R.I.P.» (Sofía Reyes feat. Rita Ora & Anitta)	17 (4, 4, 5, 4)
13 July	Lizardo Ponce & Josefina Oriozabala	«Sorry» (Justin Bieber feat. J Balvin)	16 (4, 5, 4, 3)

The duel
Date	Couple	Act	Result
14 July	Rocío Marengo & Ignacio Pérez Cortés	His presentation was titled as: "A sung novel dream" where they sang and danced. They also included acting moments. Songs «La extraña dama» (Valeria Lynch) «Por amor a vos» (Valeria Lynch & Cacho Castaña) «¿Y qué?» (Paz Martínez) «Tengo esperanza» (Lali Espósito) «Herederos» (David Bisbal)	1st couple saved
14 July	Débora Plager & Nicolás Villalba	They danced milonga. Song «Nocturna» (Julián Plaza)	4th couple saved
14 July	Mario Guerci & Soledad Bayona	They made a tribute to mothers. Guerci sang live and played the guitar. Bayona danced alongside a guest dancer. They had the special participation of singer and actress Natalia Cociuffo, who sang with Guerci. Song «Las manos de mi madre» (Mercedes Sosa)	Bottom two (74.1%)
14 July	Mariana Genesio Peña & Rodrigo Jara	They performed a musical inspired by the Dreamgirls film. His presentation includes moments of dance, acting and humor. They had the special participation of two friends of Genesio Peña: the actresses Romina Escobar and "Payuca". Songs «Dreamgirls» (Jennifer Hudson, Beyoncé & Anika Noni Rose) «One Night Only» (Leading Ladies)	3rd couple saved
14 July	Romina Ricci & Juan Manuel Palao	Ricci performs a William Shakespeare monologue from the play Hamlet, adapted to 2021 and in the context of the COVID-19 pandemic. The text was written by herself and by argentine playwright Norman Briski.	Eliminated (25.9%)
14 July	Lizardo Ponce & Josefina Oriozabala	They made a presentation entitled: "Choreography creating music". Songs «Cuban Pete» (Jim Carrey) «La isla del sol» (El Símbolo) «Who Let the Dogs Out» (Baha Men) «L-Gante: Bzrp Music Sessions, Vol. 38» (Bizarrap & L-Gante)	2nd couple saved

Blue numbers indicate the lowest score
Green numbers indicate the highest score

Sentenced
Saved by the judges
Saved by the audience
Eliminated

=== Round 6: Reggaeton ===
Running order

Song and scores
Date	Couple	Song	Scores
14 July	José María Peña & Florencia Díaz	Mix: «Hay que bueno» (KD One) «Calabria» (Rune) «Súbete» (Lary Over & Lírico en la casa)	24 (5, 6, 8, 5)
15 July	Karina Tejeda & Rafael Muñiz	Mix: «Travesuras» (Nicky Jam) «Sal y perrea» (Sech) «Trakatá» (Ptazeta, Farina & Juacko)	23 (5, 6, 7, 5)
15 July	Ángela Leiva & Jonathan Lazarte	Mix: «Hips Don't Lie» (Shakira feat. Wyclef Jean) (Note: Ángela Leiva sang at the beginning of the performance.) «X» (Nicky Jam & J Balvin)	25 (7, 6, 5, 7)
15 July	Julieta Nair Calvo & Gonzalo Gerber	Mix: «Mi cama» (Karol G) «Nathy Peluso: Bzrp Music Sessions, Vol. 36» (Bizarrap & Nathy Peluso)	40 (10, 10, 10, 10)
16 July	Agustín Sierra & Fiorella Giménez	«Machika» (J Balvin, Jeon & Anitta)	30 (9, 8, 7, 6)
16 July	Florencia Vigna & Facundo Mazzei	Mix: «Mi gente» (J Balvin & Willy William) «Miedo» (Cazzu)	38 (10, 10, 9, 9)
16 July	Viviana Saccone & Ernesto Díaz	«Bellacoso» (Residente & Bad Bunny)	25 (7, 7, 6, 5)
16 July	Rocío Marengo & Ignacio Pérez Cortés	Mix: «Rakata» (Wisin & Yandel) «Gasolina» (Daddy Yankee feat. Glory) «Rompe» (Daddy Yankee)	26 (7, 6, 7, 6) (Note: On 16 June, due to lack of time, the judges' score was not completed. On 19 June, it was completed.)
19 July	Ezequiel Cwirkaluk & Bárbara Silenzi	«En la cama» (Nicky Jam feat. Daddy Yankee)	23 (6, 7, 6, 4)
19 July	Lizardo Ponce & Josefina Oriozabala	Mix: «Como Antes» (Yandel feat. Wisin) «Problema» (Daddy Yankee) «Ponle» (Farruko feat. Rvssian & J Balvin)	23 (7, 5, 6, 5)
19 July	Bárbara Franco & Gabriel Rentería	Mix: «China» (Anuel AA, Daddy Yankee, Karol G, Ozuna & J Balvin) «La tóxica» (Farruko, Sech, Myke Towers feat. Jay Wheeler & Tempo)	29 (8, 8, 7, 6)
20 July	Mar Tarrés & Franco Mariotti	«Pam» (Justin Quiles, Daddy Yankee & El Alfa)	19 (3, 5, 6, 5)
20 July	Luciana Salazar & Jorge Moliniers	Mix: «Perreito salvaje» (Emilia Mernes & Boza) «El efecto» (Rauw Alejandro & Chencho Corleone)	25 (8, 7, 5, 5)
20 July	Débora Plager & Nicolás Villalba	«Mala santa» (Becky G)	16 (4, 4, 4, 4)
20 July	Mariela Anchipi (Note: In replacement of Sofía Jiménez (who could not dance due to injury).) & Ignacio Saraceni	«Las nenas» (Natti Natasha, Cazzu & Farina feat. La Duraca)	28 (8, 6, 7, 7)
20 July	Mario Guerci & Soledad Bayona	«Con Calma» (Daddy Yankee feat. Snow)	31 (6, 10, 8, 7)
21 July	Mariana Genesio Peña & Rodrigo Jara	«Me gusta» (Anitta feat. Cardi B & Myke Towers)	23 (6, 6, 6, 5)
21 July	Candela Ruggeri & Nicolás Fleitas	Mix: «Tranquila» (J Balvin) «Yo soy tu gatita» (La Factoría) «Descontrol» (Daddy Yankee) «Me Estás Tentando» (Wisin & Yandel)	36 (10, 10, 9, 7)

The duel
Date	Couple	Act	Result
21 July	Karina Tejeda & Rafael Muñiz	At the beginning, Tejeda sang live and Muñiz danced alone to the rhythm of the music (dance style: contemporary dance). Later, they danced tango. Song «Que tango hay que cantar» (Valeria Lynch)	Due to the withdrawal of Genesio Peña, all the couples advanced directly to the next round.
21 July	Ezequiel Cwirkaluk & Bárbara Silenzi	Silenzi, at the beginning of the presentation, made lip sync. Later, they danced argentine cumbia. Song Mix: «Olvídame y Pega la Vuelta» (Pimpinela) / (Grupo Sueños feat. Anny)	Due to the withdrawal of Genesio Peña, all the couples advanced directly to the next round.
21 July	Débora Plager & Nicolás Villalba	They performed a singing performance. Songs Mix: «Luna cautiva» (José Ignacio Rodríguez) «Zamba para olvidar» (Daniel Toro)	Due to the withdrawal of Genesio Peña, all the couples advanced directly to the next round.
21 July	Lizardo Ponce & Josefina Oriozabala	They performed a danced. His dance had as a guest: Martín Salwe. It also featured a clip featuring Lourdes Sánchez (dancer & presenter), Gabriel Fernández (producer & panelist), Martín Salwe (announcer & panelist), Celeste Muriega (vedette & panelist) and Ponce where they talk about what idea to do in the duel. Song «Everybody» (Backstreet Boys)	Due to the withdrawal of Genesio Peña, all the couples advanced directly to the next round.
21 July	Mar Tarrés & Franco Mariotti	His presentation was titled as: "For your dream". She made a presentation where they acted, sang (made playback with their previously recorded voices) and danced. There was also a parade with plus size models. Songs «You Can't Stop the Beat (in Spanish)» (from Hairspray) «Run the World (Girls)» (Beyoncé)	Due to the withdrawal of Genesio Peña, all the couples advanced directly to the next round.
22 July	Mariana Genesio Peña & Rodrigo Jara	No presentation	Withdrew

Blue numbers indicate the lowest score
Green numbers indicate the highest score

Sentenced
Saved by the production
Withdrew

=== Round 7: "Singing" ===
Individual judges' scores in the charts below (given in parentheses) are listed in this order from left to right: Ángel de Brito, Guillermina Valdés, Jimena Barón, Hernán Piquín.

The celebrities will have to sing in live one (or more) song(s). The professionals will not have the obligation to sing, but they can do it if they wish. They can also include dance in their performance.

In this round, Sofía Jiménez returned temporarily to sing, but she has not yet recovered from the injury to be able to dance. For this reason, she will be replaced again by Mariela Anchipi in the next round.

All couples will have a singing choreographer. In addition, in this round there will be a choreographer chief of singing: Sebastián Mazzoni.

From 22 July to 2 August, Valdés returned to the judging panel but this time to replace Carolina Ardohain, who went on leave as she became a mother.

Running order

Song and scores
Date	Couple	Song	Scores
22 July	Ángela Leiva & Jonathan Lazarte	Mix: «Fame» (Irene Cara) «Footloose» (Kenny Loggins) «(I've Had) The Time of My Life» (Bill Medley & Jennifer Warnes)	35 (10, 9, 10, 6)
22 July	Julieta Nair Calvo & Gonzalo Gerber	Mix: «Seguir viviendo sin tu amor» / «Muchacha (Ojos de papel)» (Luis Alberto Spinetta)	33 (7, 10, 9, 7)
22 July	Viviana Saccone & Ernesto Díaz	«Fuiste Tú» (Ricardo Arjona & Gaby Moreno)	12 (0, 4, 3, 5)
23 July	Florencia Vigna & Facundo Mazzei	«I Love Rock 'n' Roll» (Britney Spears)	25 (6, 7, 7, 5)
23 July	Agustín Sierra & Fiorella Giménez	«Me gustas mucho» (Viejas Locas)	26 (5, 9, 7, 5)
23 July	Rocío Marengo & Ignacio Pérez Cortés	«Desde Esa Noche» (Thalía feat. Maluma)	10 (0, 4, 3, 3)
23 July	Bárbara Franco & Gabriel Rentería	«Me vas a extrañar» (Damas Gratis)	16 (4, 5, 4, 3)
23 July	Sofía Jiménez & Ignacio Saraceni	«Yo No Soy Esa Mujer» (Paulina Rubio)	17 (3, 6, 5, 3)
23 July	Mario Guerci & Soledad Bayona	«Qué nivel de mujer» (Luis Miguel)	26 (7, 7, 7, 5)
26 July	Karina Tejeda & Rafael Muñiz	«Tu falta de querer» (Mon Laferte)	35 (9, 10, 9, 7)
26 July	Mar Tarrés & Sergio Miranda (Note: Her singing choreographer in replacement of Franco Mariotti (who was absent for health reasons).)	«Color Esperanza» (Diego Torres)	22 (6, 7, 5, 4)
26 July	Débora Plager & Nicolás Villalba	«El embrujo» (Los Palmeras)	28 (6, 8, 7, 7)
26 July	José María Peña & Florencia Díaz	«Cha-cha, muchacha» (Rubén Rada)	25 (6, 8, 6, 5)
26 July	Lizardo Ponce & Josefina Oriozabala	«Ahora te puedes marchar» (Luis Miguel)	24 (5, 8, 6, 5)
26 July	Candela Ruggeri & Nicolás Fleitas	Mix: «Trátame suavemente» (Soda Stereo) «Persiana americana» (Agapornis)	16 (3, 6, 3, 4)
27 July	Luciana Salazar & Jorge Moliniers	«Yesterday» (The Beatles)	32 (9, 10, 7, 6)
27 July	Ezequiel Cwirkaluk & Bárbara Silenzi	«Aventura» (Abel Pintos feat. Marcela Morelo)	28 (9, 9, 6, 4)

The duel
Date	Couple	Act	Result
28 July	Viviana Saccone & Ernesto Díaz	They performed a singing performance. They performed the same song again of this round because at the time of doing it they a mistake and got lost with the lyrics (authorized by the production, since the routine cannot be repeated). Song «Fuiste Tú» (Ricardo Arjona & Gaby Moreno)	1st couple saved
28 July	Rocío Marengo & Ignacio Pérez Cortés	Their presentation was titled: "Marenguisima, the revue". They performed a revue presentation. Their presentation had as guests: Juan Leandro Nimo (dancer & former professional of Bailando) and Sergio Gonal (comedian & actor). Songs Mix: «Because We Can» / «Welcome to the Moulin Rouge» / «Sparkling Diamonds» / «Lady Marmalade» (from Moulin Rouge!)	Bottom two (Last to be called safe)
28 July	Bárbara Franco & Gabriel Rentería	They performed a dance of folk fusion. Their presentation had as guests: Rosario Juárez (dancer) and Julieta Belatti (dancer).	Eliminated
28 July	Candela Ruggeri & Nicolás Fleitas	They performed a dance. Their dance had as a guest: their choreographer Matías Ramos. Song «Mi gente» (J Balvin & Willy William feat. Beyoncé)	2nd couple saved
Judges' votes to save (Bottom two): de Brito: Rocío Marengo & Ignacio Pérez Cortés; Piquín: Rocío Marengo & Ignacio Pérez Cortés; Barón: Bárbara Franco & Gabriel Rentería; Valdés: Rocío Marengo & Ignacio Pérez Cortés; Result Bárbara Franco & Gabriel Rentería (1 vote) Rocío Marengo & Ignacio Pérez Cortés (3 votes)

Blue numbers indicate the lowest score
Green numbers indicate the highest score

Sentenced
Saved by the judges
Eliminated

=== Round 8: "Superduel" ===
"Superduel" method

- In this round, the 16 competing couples will face each other in individual duels (that is, one couple will face another) and those crosses will be defined by the average of the scores obtained in all the dances performed so far.
- The duels will be conformed as follows:

First duel
#1: average 1 vs. average 16
#2: average 2 vs. average 15
#3: average 3 vs. average 14
#4: average 4 vs. average 13
#5: average 5 vs. average 12
#6: average 6 vs. average 11
#7: average 7 vs. average 10
#8: average 8 vs. average 9

Second duel
#9: loser of #1 vs. loser of #3
#10: loser of #2 vs. loser of #4
#11: loser of #5 vs. loser of #7
#12: loser of #6 vs. loser of #8

Third duel
#13: loser of #9 vs. loser of #11
#14: loser of #10 vs. loser of #12

Fourth duel
#15: loser of #13 vs. loser of #14

- Each judge will choose one of two couples. The couple with the most votes will advance to the next round and the remaining couple will continue into the next match (in the event of a tie, the choreographers chiefs define). Until the last two couples remain, where the eliminated couple of this round will be defined.
- The "Super duel" will have 4 stages:
  - Top 16: In this round all the couples that are still in competition will dance; will present a choreography by cuarteto.
  - Bottom 8: At this stage only the worst 8 couples from the Top 16 will be presented; will perform again their choreography of disco.
  - Bottom 4: In this instance the worst 4 couples will remain (the losers of Bottom 8); they will have to dance again their choreography of ballroom samba.
  - Bottom 2: This is the last stage of the "Super duel" , where a couple will be eliminated. The two worst couples will have to dance a choreography of urban pop.

==== Average score chart ====
This table only counts dances scored on a 40-point scale.

Rank by average	Couple	Total points	Number of dances	Average
1	Florencia Vigna & Facundo Mazzei	226	7	32.3
2	Julieta Nair Calvo & Gonzalo Gerber	223	7	31.9
3	Agustín Sierra & Fiorella Giménez	220	7	31.4
4	Candela Ruggeri & Nicolás Fleitas	205	7	29.2
5	Ángela Leiva & Jonathan Lazarte	201	7	28.7
6	Karina Tejeda & Rafael Muñiz	182	7	26.0
7	Viviana Saccone & Ernesto Díaz	172	7	24.6
8	Luciana Salazar & Jorge Moliniers	166	7	23.7
9	Rocío Marengo & Ignacio Pérez Cortés	164	7	23.4
10	Lizardo Ponce & Josefina Oriozabala	160	7	22.9
11	Sofía Jiménez & Ignacio Saraceni	158	7	22.6
12	Mario Guerci & Soledad Bayona	154	7	22.0
13	Mar Tarrés & Franco Mariotti	153	7	21.9
14	Débora Plager & Nicolás Villalba	151	7	21.6
15	Ezequiel Cwirkaluk & Bárbara Silenzi	151	7	21.6
16	José María Peña & Florencia Díaz	142	7	20.3

Key
Eliminated	Saved by the judges	Sentenced for the next duel	: The point is for the couple. : The point is not for the couple.

== First duel: Cuarteto ==
Running order

Song and scores
Date	#	Couple	Song	Scores
28 July	1	Florencia Vigna & Facundo Mazzei	Mix: «¿Quién se ha tomado todo el vino?» (La Mona Jiménez) «Nicky Jam: Bzrp Music Sessions, Vol. 41» (Bizarrap & Nicky Jam)	3 (Note: There was a tie between the judges, so that María Laura Rossi and Eugenia López Frugoni (choreographers chiefs) gave the decisive vote.)
28 July	1	José María Peña & Florencia Díaz	«Llegó tu papi» (Jean Carlos)	2
28 July	2	Julieta Nair Calvo & Gonzalo Gerber	Mix: «Soy sabalero» (Los Palmeras) «Se menea y el taka taka» (Nolberto Al-k-la)	1
28 July	2	Ezequiel Cwirkaluk & Celeste Muriega (Note: In replacement of Bárbara Silenzi (who could not dance due to injury).)	«Soy cordobés» (Rodrigo & Carlos Vives)	3
29 July
29 July	3	Agustín Sierra & Fiorella Giménez	«Quiéreme» (Jean Carlos)	1
29 July	3	Débora Plager & Nicolás Villalba	«Amor secreto» (La 840)	3
29 July	4	Candela Ruggeri & Nicolás Fleitas	«Cómo le digo» (Rodrigo)	3
29 July	4	Mar Tarrés & Rodrigo Jara (Note: In replacement of Franco Mariotti (who was absent for health reasons).)	«Salvaje» (La Barra)	2
29 July	5	Ángela Leiva & Jonathan Lazarte	«Pero Me Acuerdo de Ti» (Jean Carlos)	4
29 July	5	Mario Guerci & Soledad Bayona	«Ya me enteré» (La K'onga)	0
29 July	6	Karina Tejeda & Rafael Muñiz	«Te Perdiste Mi Amor» (La K'onga & Damián Córdoba)	3
29 July	6	Mariela Anchipi (Note: In replacement of Sofía Jiménez (who could not dance due to injury).) & Ignacio Saraceni	«Cómo olvidarla» (Rodrigo)	2
29 July	7	Viviana Saccone & Ernesto Díaz	«Todo de Ti» (Simón Aguirre feat. Q' Lokura & El Joaco)	1
29 July	7	Lizardo Ponce & Josefina Oriozabala	«Soy un adicto a ti» (Walter Olmos)	3
30 July
30 July	8	Luciana Salazar & Jorge Moliniers	«Por lo que yo te quiero» (Walter Olmos)	3
30 July	8	Rocío Marengo & Ignacio Pérez Cortés	«Fuego y pasión» (Rodrigo)	2

== Second duel: Disco ==
For the first time in the history of the show, a choreographer (María Laura Cattalini) from another team (of Angela Leiva & Jonathan Lazarte), who are still in competition, will replace a celebrity (Viviana Saccone). This happens because the production needed to choose someone capable of learning the choreographies in a matter of hours.

Mar Tarrés will have to dance another choreography, because her former choreographer (Judith Kovalovsky) did not allow her to use the choreography put by her in the respective round.

Running order

Song and scores
Date	#	Couple	Song	Scores
30 July	9	José María Peña & Florencia Díaz	«Let's Groove» (Earth, Wind & Fire)	0
30 July	9	Agustín Sierra & Fiorella Giménez	«Don't Stop 'Til You Get Enough» (Michael Jackson)	4
30 July	10	Julieta Nair Calvo & Gonzalo Gerber	Mix: «Get Up Offa That Thing» (James Brown) «Sex Machine» (from Legally Blonde)	4
30 July	10	Mar Tarrés & Franco Mariotti	Mix: «Seven Nation Army» (The White Stripes) «You Make Me Feel (Mighty Real)» (Sylvester)	0
30 July	11	Mario Guerci & Soledad Bayona	«Juice» (Lizzo)	0
30 July	11	María Laura Cattalini (Note: In replacement of Viviana Saccone (who was absent for work reasons).) & Ernesto Díaz	«Cosmic Girl» (Jamiroquai)	4
30 July	12	Mariela Anchipi & Ignacio Saraceni	«One Kiss» (Calvin Harris & Dua Lipa)	0
30 July	12	Rocío Marengo & Ignacio Pérez Cortés	Mix: «Gimme! Gimme! Gimme! (A Man After Midnight)» / «Voulez-Vous» (ABBA)	4

== Third duel: Ballroom samba ==
Running order

Song and scores
Date	#	Couple	Song	Scores
30 July	13	José María Peña & Florencia Díaz	«Más macarena» (Los del Río feat. Gente de Zona)	3
30 July	13	Mario Guerci & Soledad Bayona	«La bomba» (Ricky Martin)	1
30 July	14	Mar Tarrés & Franco Mariotti	«Qué Rico Fuera» (Ricky Martin & Paloma Mami)	1
30 July	14	Mariela Anchipi & Ignacio Saraceni	«Watch Out for This (Bumaye)» (Major Lazer feat. Busy Signal, The Flexican & FS Green)	3

== Fourth duel: Urban pop ==
For this duel, the couples will have the option to decide whether to choose the song that they danced in round 1 or in round 3. Although, they will have to perform a new choreography with the chosen song.

On 30 July, this duel was unfinished because Mar Tarrés had health problems, therefore, could not dance; in the next transmission (2 August) the duel will be defined. On 2 August, the production gave Mario Guerci & Soledad Bayona the opportunity to dance again; they refused.

Running order

Song and scores
Date	#	Couple	Song	Scores
30 July	15	Mario Guerci & Soledad Bayona	Mashup: «Sax» (Fleur East) «Uptown Funk» (Mark Ronson feat. Bruno Mars)	3
2 August	15	Mar Tarrés & Franco Mariotti	Mix: «Girl Like Me» (Black Eyed Peas & Shakira) «Destination Calabria» (Alex Gaudino feat. Crystal Waters) «Fireball» (Pitbull feat. John Ryan)	1

=== Round 9: Pole dance ===
On 2 August, Ardohain returned to the judging table; Valdés will remain as fifth judge.

Running order

Song and scores
Date	Couple	Song	Scores
2 August	Florencia Vigna & Facundo Mazzei	«Adiós Nonino» (Ástor Piazzolla)	37 (10, 5, 10, 7, 5)
2 August	Candela Ruggeri & Nicolás Fleitas	«Believer» (Imagine Dragons)	28 (7, 4, 8, 5, 4)
3 August	Agustín Sierra & Fiorella Giménez	«Boom» (X Ambassadors)	50 (10, 10, 10, 10, 10)
3 August	Ezequiel Cwirkaluk & Celeste Muriega (Note: In replacement of Bárbara Silenzi (who could not dance due to injury).)	«Oh! Darling» (Juliet Simms)	23 (6, 2, 7, 4, 4)
3 August	Viviana Saccone & Ernesto Díaz	«Seven Nation Army» (Skáld)	19 (5, 2, 5, 3, 4)
4 August	Karina Tejeda & Rafael Muñiz	«Dangerous Woman» (Ariana Grande)	25 (7, 3, 6, 5, 4)
4 August	Noelia Marzol (Note: In replacement of Débora Plager (who could not dance due to injury).) & Nicolás Villalba	Mix: «Dark Side» (Bishop Briggs) «Gangsta» (Kehlani)	20 (4, 0, 6, 5, 5)
5 August	Rocío Marengo & Ignacio Pérez Cortés	Mix: «Twisted Nerve» (Bernard Herrmann) «Battle Without Honor or Humanity» (Tomoyasu Hotei) «Shot Me Down» (David Guetta feat. Skylar Grey)	34 (9, 4, 9, 6, 6)
5 August	Valeria Archimó (Note: In replacement of Ángela Leiva (who could not dance for personal reasons).) & Jonathan Lazarte	Mix: «The Greatest Show» (Hugh Jackman, Keala Settle, Zac Efron & Zendaya) «Baby Boy» (Beyoncé feat. Sean Paul)	26 (4, 0, 8, 7, 7)
5 August	Lizardo Ponce & Josefina Oriozabala	«Creep» (Postmodern Jukebox)	38 (10, 5, 10, 7, 6)
6 August	Luciana Salazar & Jorge Moliniers	«Sweet Dreams (Are Made of This)» (Marilyn Manson)	39 (8, 6, 9, 9, 7)
6 August	José María Peña & Florencia Díaz (with Gabriel Conti) (Note: Peña is injured but did not want to ask for a replacement and chose to do a trio dance; adding to his choreography the dancer and choreographer Gabriel Conti (Pablo Prada & Lourdes Sánchez's former choreographer). It is the first time in the history of the show that an injured participant is allowed to perform a trio dance.)	«Fire» (BTS)	19 (0, 3, 5, 6, 5)
6 August	Bárbara Franco & Gabriel Rentería (Note: In replacement of Julieta Nair Calvo & Gonzalo Gerber (who could not dance because their choreographer, Hernán Alegre, tested positive for COVID-19; therefore, they entered preventive isolation).)	Mix: «Hit the Road Jack» (2WEI) «Highway to Hell» (Sershen & Zarítskaya)	36 (4, 6, 10, 8, 8)
6 August	Mario Guerci & Soledad Bayona	«Feeling Good» (Muse)	44 (8, 10, 9, 9, 8)
9 August	Mariela Anchipi (Note: In replacement of Sofía Jiménez (who could not dance due to injury).) & Ignacio Saraceni	«Fall in Line» (Christina Aguilera feat. Demi Lovato)	27 (4, 0, 7, 7, 7)

The duel
Date	Couple	Act	Result
9 August	Ezequiel Cwirkaluk & Celeste Muriega	By production decision, the couples will perform again the choreography made in pole dance.	2nd couple saved
9 August	Viviana Saccone & Ernesto Díaz	By production decision, the couples will perform again the choreography made in pole dance.	Bottom two (53.2%)
9 August	Noelia Marzol & Nicolás Villalba	By production decision, the couples will perform again the choreography made in pole dance.	Eliminated (46.8%)
9 August	Nazareno Móttola (Note: In replacement of José María Peña (who could not dance due to injury).) & Florencia Díaz	By production decision, the couples will perform again the choreography made in pole dance.	1st couple saved

Blue numbers indicate the lowest score
Green numbers indicate the highest score

Sentenced
Saved by the judges
Saved by the audience
Eliminated

=== Round 10: Argentine cumbia ===
Running order

Song and scores
Date	Couple	Song	Scores
10 August	Ángela Leiva & Jonathan Lazarte	Mix: «Quien eres tú» / «Amiga traidora» (Ángela Leiva)	42 (8, 7, 10, 9, 8)
10 August	Florencia Vigna & Facundo Mazzei	Mix: «Veneno de serpiente» (Axel Caram) «La cobra» (J Mena)	44 (10, 10, 7, 9, 8)
10 August	Candela Ruggeri & Nicolás Fleitas	«Si me tomo una cerveza» (Migrantes feat. Rombai, Oscu, Agapornis & Alico)	38 (7, 9, 8, 7, 7)
11 August	Agustín Sierra & Fiorella Giménez	Mix: «Baila sola» (Eh' Guacho) «Mentirosa» (Ráfaga)	49 (10, 10, 10, 10, 9)
11 August	Rocío Marengo & Ignacio Pérez Cortés	«Te vas» (Américo)	22 (3, 5, 5, 5, 4)
11 August	Ariel Puchetta & Sofía Cerruto	«Si me tomo una cerveza» (Migrantes feat. Ráfaga)	23 (4, 6, 6, 4, 3)
12 August	Karina Tejeda & Rafael Muñiz	«Yo tomo licor» (Amar Azul)	40 (8, 8, 8, 8, 8)
12 August	Viviana Saccone & Ernesto Díaz	Mix: «Una calle nos separa» (Néstor en Bloque) «Agüita» / «La luna y tú» (Ráfaga)	38 (7, 7, 8, 8, 8)
12 August	José María Peña & Florencia Díaz	«Llamado de Emergencia» (Daddy Yankee)	31 (10, 5, 7, 5, 4)
12 August	Mario Guerci & Soledad Bayona	«No te creas tan importante» (Damas Gratis)	20 (3, 4, 4, 4, 5)
13 August	Ezequiel Cwirkaluk & Bárbara Silenzi	Mix: «Pega la vuelta» (Grupo Sombras) «Ya llegó el sabor» (La Cumbia)	34 (5, 8, 6, 8, 7)
13 August	Rodrigo Tapari & Sol Beatriz	«Fue difícil» (Rodrigo Tapari)	44 (9, 8, 10, 8, 9)
13 August	Sofía Jiménez & Ignacio Saraceni	«Márchate ahora» (Los Totora)	20 (3, 4, 5, 5, 3)
16 August	Luciana Salazar & Jorge Moliniers	«Con la misma moneda» (Karina, «La Princesita»)	31 (6, 6, 8, 6, 5)
16 August	Mariela Anchipi & Nicolás Schell	«Amores como el nuestro» (Los Charros)	32 (7, 6, 7, 6, 6)
16 August	Lionel Ferro & Camila Lonigro	«Bésame» (El Reja, Lira, Rombai feat. Hernán & La Champions Liga)	46 (9, 10, 10, 10, 7)
17 August	Julieta Nair Calvo & Gabriel Rentería (Note: In replacement of Gonzalo Gerber (who tested positive for COVID-19). Calvo completed his isolation, was swabbed (on several occasions) and (always) was negative for COVID-19. Hernán Alegre, the couple's choreographer, has already been discharged epidemiologically.)	«Pistola» (L-Gante, Damas Gratis, El Más Ladrón & DT.Bilardo)	39 (9, 7, 9, 7, 7)
17 August	Celeste Muriega & Maximiliano Diorio	Mix: «La cola» (Los Palmeras) «Jeans» (Justin Quiles)	41 (8, 9, 8, 8, 8)
17 August	Lizardo Ponce & Josefina Oriozabala	Mix: «El bombón asesino» (Los Palmeras) «Alza las manos» (Damas Gratis) «Llegamos los pibes chorros» (Pibes Chorros) «Combi nueva» (L-Gante, Papichamp, Blunted Vato & Ecko)	30 (5, 7, 7, 5, 6)

The duel
Date	Couple	Act	Result
18 August	Rocío Marengo & Ignacio Pérez Cortés	His presentation was titled: "Dear, Sandro". They performed a dance to honor Sandro. They had the presence of an imitator of Sandro (Fernando Samartín) who sang live. Songs Mix: «Como lo hice yo» / «Tengo» / «Dame el fuego de tu amor» (Sandro)	2nd couple saved
18 August	Ariel Puchetta & Sofía Cerruto	Puchetta sang live. Cerruto danced to the rhythm of the music. They had the special participation of Meliza Blanco (musician, composer & harmonica player) who played the harmonica to accompany Puchetta. Song «Tan solo» (Los Piojos)	Eliminated
18 August	Mario Guerci & Soledad Bayona	His presentation was titled: "Video game fight"; where they presented a dance fused with fighting figures. Songs Mix: «Shot Me Down» (David Guetta feat. Skylar Grey) «Techno Syndrome (Mortal Kombat)» (The Immortals)	1st couple saved
18 August	Sofía Jiménez & Ignacio Saraceni	They danced carnavalito. They were accompanied by two invited dancers (Lucila Machuca and Sebastián Escurra). Songs Mix: «Soy soltero» / «Vienes y te vas» (Los Tekis)	Bottom two (Last to be called safe)
Judges' votes to save (Bottom two): Piquín: Sofía Jiménez & Ignacio Saraceni; Valdés: Sofía Jiménez & Ignacio Saraceni; de Brito: Sofía Jiménez & Ignacio Saraceni; Barón: Sofía Jiménez & Ignacio Saraceni; Ardohain: Ariel Puchetta & Sofía Cerruto; Result Ariel Puchetta & Sofía Cerruto (1 vote) Sofía Jiménez & Ignacio Saraceni (4 votes)

Blue numbers indicate the lowest score
Green numbers indicate the highest score

Sentenced
Saved by the judges
Eliminated

=== Round 11: Trio salsa ===
The couples danced trio salsa involving another celebrity or a close acquaintance (friend or family member).

Running order

Song and scores
Date	Couple (Trio Dance Partner)	Song	Scores
19 August	Agustín Sierra & Fiorella Giménez (Maitena "Kuky" Romero Cabral)	«Despacito (Salsa version)» (Luis Fonsi feat. Víctor Manuelle)	50 (10, 10, 10, 10, 10)
19 August	Rodrigo Tapari & Sol Beatriz (Santiago "Tyago" Griffo)	«I Love Salsa» (N'Klabe)	39 (7, 8, 10, 7, 7)
20 August	Karina Tejeda & Rafael Muñiz (Mónica Cuello)	«Puro veneno» (Nathy Peluso)	35 (9, 6, 8, 6, 6)
23 August	Florencia Vigna & Facundo Mazzei (Omar Mazzei)	«Bemba colorá» (Jennifer Lopez) / (Celia Cruz)	47 (9, 9, 10, 9, 10)
23 August	José María Peña & Florencia Díaz (Nazareno Móttola)	«Se le ve» (Andy Montañez feat. Daddy Yankee)	42 (9, 7, 8, 8, 10)
23 August	Candela Ruggeri & Nicolás Fleitas (Alicia Cevallos)	«La Vida Es Un Carnaval» (Celia Cruz)	33 (7, 7, 8, 5, 6)
24 August	Luciana Salazar & Jorge Moliniers (Mariano Martínez)	«Conga» (Miami Sound Machine & Gloria Estefan)	36 (7, 7, 8, 7, 7)
24 August	Rocío Marengo & Ignacio Pérez Cortés (Graciela Paganini)	«Vivir mi vida» (Marc Anthony)	31 (7, 6, 6, 6, 6)
25 August	Julieta Nair Calvo & Gabriel Rentería (Note: In replacement of Gonzalo Gerber (who is recovering from COVID-19).) (Federico Salles)	«Oye!» (Gloria Estefan)	42 (9, 7, 10, 8, 8)
25 August	Lizardo Ponce & Josefina Oriozabala (Cinthia Fernández)	«Magdalena, mi amor» (Dark Latin Groove feat. Ivy Queen)	40 (7, 10, 10, 7, 6)
25 August	Lionel Ferro & Camila Lonigro (Micaela Viciconte)	«Colgando en tus manos (Salsa version)» (Carlos Baute feat. Marta Sánchez)	29 (5, 7, 8, 5, 4)
26 August	Ángela Leiva & Jonathan Lazarte (Note: Jonathan Lazarte, professional Ángela Leiva's, tested COVID-19 positive. Although both Leiva and Cattalini (choreographer) tested negative; even so, were isolated out of caution as indicated by the health protocol. After the 7 days of isolation, Leiva and Cattalini returned to rehearsal but without Lazarte, who was replaced by Rodrigo Jara. Finally, after receiving the epidemiological discharge and be in good health, Lazarte will dance.) (Brian Lanzelotta) (Note: Initially, Leiva was going to dance with Francisco Caivano, but he tested positive for COVID-19.)	«De vuelta pa' la vuelta» (Daddy Yankee & Marc Anthony)	36 (6, 7, 7, 8, 8)
26 August	Viviana Saccone & Ernesto Díaz (Diego Ramos)	«Salsa con coco» (Pochy y su Cocoband)	40 (9, 7, 9, 7, 8)
26 August	Sofía Jiménez & Ignacio Saraceni (Martín Salwe)	«Será que no me amas (Salsa version)» (Tony Succar feat. Michael Stuart)	44 (9, 8, 9, 8, 10)
27 August	Ezequiel Cwirkaluk & Bárbara Silenzi (Martín Baclini)	«Aguanilé» (Marc Anthony)	44 (10, 9, 9, 9, 7)
27 August	Mariela Anchipi & Nicolás Schell (Dan Breitman)	Mix: «I Like It» / «En Barranquilla me quedo» / «Chantaje (Salsa version)» / «Callaíta» (Shakira feat. Bad Bunny [in the Super Bowl LIV halftime show])	31 (3, 5, 10, 6, 7)
27 August	Celeste Muriega & Maximiliano Diorio (Adabel Guerrero)	«Uptown Funk (Salsa version)» (Mark Ronson feat. Bruno Mars & Brian Safdie)	49 (10, 10, 10, 10, 9)
27 August	Mario Guerci & Soledad Bayona (Rodrigo Noya)	«Mafiosa» (Nathy Peluso)	39 (7, 8, 8, 8, 8)

The duel
Date	Couple	Act	Result
30 August	Candela Ruggeri & Nicolás Fleitas	They danced acrobatic merengue. His dance had as a guest: Rodrigo Jara (Mariana Genesio Peña's former professional). It also featured a clip featuring Alicia Cevallos (Candela Ruggeri's grandmother) refused to dance again (in a humorous tone) and that recommended inviting Jara to dance (who helped them prepare the salsa dance). Song «Es mentiroso» (Olga Tañón)	1st couple saved
30 August	Rocío Marengo & Ignacio Pérez Cortés	Their presentation was titled: "The rock of Marengo". Their performance was a combination of singing and dancing with rock thematic. His dance had as a guest: Pablo Juín (dancer & former professional of Bailando) and Fernando Bertona (dancer & former professional of Bailando). Ignacio Pérez Cortés sang live (and in Spanish) all the songs. The songs were re-versioned. Songs Mix: «Fever» / «Jailhouse Rock» (Elvis Presley) «La plaga» (Los Teen Tops)	2nd couple saved
30 August	Lionel Ferro & Camila Lonigro	They performed a danced in roller skates. His dance had as a guest: Melisa García (dancer, skater & acrobat) and Carlos Urquia (skater) Song «Boy with Luv (Fallen Superhero Remix)» (BTS feat. Halsey)	Bottom two (58.7%)
30 August	Mariela Anchipi & Nicolás Schell	They performed a danced routine combining street dance and tango. They had the special participation of Guillermo Fernández (singer) and Matías Carrica (rapper) who sang live. Song «Balada para un loco» (Roberto Goyeneche)	Eliminated (41.3%)

Blue numbers indicate the lowest score
Green numbers indicate the highest score

Sentenced
Saved by the judges
Saved by the audience
Eliminated
Withdrew

=== Round 12: "One (song) we all know" ===
The couples will have to dance to a popular song, chosen by them (together with their choreographer). The judges evaluate whether or not the danced song is a musical hit (in addition to the choreography).

On 7 and 8 September, Carolina Ardohain was absent for personal reasons. In her place, the singer (and current contestant of this edition) Karina Tejeda, was as a guest judge. It is the second time in the history of the show that a regular participant also holds an evaluator position (the first case was with Lourdes Sánchez at Bailando 2018, where she was a member of the BAR and, at the same time, the celebrity partner of Diego Ramos).

In the duel, a guest judge was present: Federico Bal, who replaces Piquín. The latter was absent due to work.

Running order

Song and scores
Date	Couple	Song	Scores
30 August	Agustín Sierra & Fiorella Giménez	«Pégate» (Ricky Martin)	27 (5, 6, 5, 6, 5)
30 August	José María Peña & Florencia Díaz	«Matador» (Los Fabulosos Cadillacs)	36 (8, 7, 7, 8, 6)
31 August	Karina Tejeda & Rafael Muñiz	Mix: «Suavemente» / «Tu Sonrisa» (Elvis Crespo)	33 (7, 5, 6, 8, 7)
31 August	Julieta Nair Calvo & Gonzalo Gerber	«Rescata mi corazón» (Manuel Wirzt)	47 (10, 9, 9, 9, 10)
31 August	Viviana Saccone & Ernesto Díaz	«La tonta» (J Mena)	38 (8, 6, 7, 10, 7)
1 September	Florencia Vigna & Facundo Mazzei	«La bomba» (King Africa)	45 (6, 9, 10, 10, 10)
1 September	Noelia Marzol & Jonathan Lazarte	«Loco un poco» (Turf)	41 (6, 6, 10, 9, 10)
2 September	The program will not be broadcast due to the match Argentina v Venezuela of the 2022 FIFA World Cup qualification.		
3 September	Luciana Salazar & Jorge Moliniers	«Me siento mucho mejor» (Charly García)	25 (5, 4, 5, 4, 7)
3 September	Nazareno Móttola (Note: In replacement of Rodrigo Tapari (who could not dance due to injury).) & Sol Beatriz	«Mi perro Dinamita» (Patricio Rey y sus Redonditos de Ricota)	40 (10, 7, 8, 7, 8)
3 September	Candela Ruggeri & Nicolás Fleitas	«Provócame» (Chayanne)	40 (10, 7, 8, 7, 8)
6 September	Rocío Marengo & Ignacio Pérez Cortés	«Sólo se vive una vez» (Azúcar Moreno)	33 (7, 5, 8, 6, 7)
6 September	Ezequiel Cwirkaluk & Bárbara Silenzi	«Más Macarena» (Gente de Zona feat. Los del Río)	31 (7, 7, 7, 5, 5)
6 September	Sofía Jiménez & Ignacio Saraceni	«Mariposa tecknicolor» (Fito Páez)	25 (5, 4, 6, 5, 5)
7 September	Lionel Ferro & Camila Lonigro	«1, 2, 3» (El Símbolo)	29 (4, 7, 7, 6, 5)
7 September	Lizardo Ponce & Josefina Oriozabala	«Rock del gato» (Ratones Paranoicos)	32 (4, 7, 8, 7, 6)
7 September	Celeste Muriega & Maximiliano Diorio	«El meneaito» (Gary H. Mason)	39 (8, 8, 9, 6, 8)
8 September	Mario Guerci & Soledad Bayona	«Mujer amante» (Rata Blanca)	41 (7, 9, 9, 9, 7)

The duel
Date	Couple	Act	Result
9 September	The program will not be broadcast due to the match Argentina v Bolivia of the 2022 FIFA World Cup qualification.		
10 September	Agustín Sierra & Fiorella Giménez	They performed a dance routine (contemporary) titled "just you and me." Song «Pilgrim» (Fink)	1st couple saved
10 September	Luciana Salazar & Jorge Moliniers	They performed a danced routine combining contemporary, jazz and acrobatics. His dance had as a guest: Gabriel Rentería (dancer & Bárbara Franco's former professional) and Luciano Paradiso (acrobat) Song «Uninvited» (Alanis Morissette)	2nd couple saved
10 September	Sofía Jiménez & Ignacio Saraceni	They performed a striptease combined with street dance. Song «Pump It» (Black Eyed Peas)	Eliminated
10 September	Lionel Ferro & Camila Lonigro	They performed a danced routine combining jazz and contemporary. Song «Breaking Free» (from High School Musical)	Bottom two (Last to be called safe)
Judges' votes to save (Bottom two): de Brito: Lionel Ferro & Camila Lonigro; Ardohain: Sofía Jiménez & Ignacio Saraceni; Valdés: Lionel Ferro & Camila Lonigro; Barón: Sofía Jiménez & Ignacio Saraceni; Bal: Lionel Ferro & Camila Lonigro; Result Lionel Ferro & Camila Lonigro (3 votes) Sofía Jiménez & Ignacio Saraceni (2 votes)

Blue numbers indicate the lowest score
Green numbers indicate the highest score

Sentenced
Saved by the judges
Eliminated

=== Round 13: "Judges' team-up challenge" ===
The couples performed a dance and song chosen by one the judges.

On 10 September, Hernán Piquín was absent from the judges' stand for work reasons. In his place was the actor, theater producer and former participant Federico Bal. Bal returned on 15 September, this time, to replace Ángel de Brito (who was not present for personal reasons). On 17 September, he returned to take the place of Piquín.

On 17 September, in addition to Piquín's absence, Guillermina Valdés also did not attend the program due to another work commitment. In her place was the dancer, TV host, former participant and former BAR judge Lourdes Sanchez.

Running order

Song and scores
Date	Couple (Team-up Judge)	Dance	Song	Scores
10 September	Florencia Vigna & Facundo Mazzei (Carolina Ardohain)	Contemporary	«Sign of the Times» (Harry Styles)	47 (8, 9, 10, 10, 10)
13 September	Julieta Nair Calvo & Gonzalo Gerber (Carolina Ardohain)	Urban	«¿Qué más pues?» (J Balvin & María Becerra)	37 (8, 7, 8, 6, 8)
13 September	Karina Tejeda & Rafael Muñiz (Ángel de Brito)	Urban	«Miénteme» (Tini & María Becerra)	38 (9, 7, 9, 6, 7)
14 September	Agustín Sierra & Fiorella Giménez (Ángel de Brito)	Disco	«Dynamite» (BTS)	47 (10, 9, 10, 9, 9)
14 September	Rocío Marengo & Ignacio Pérez Cortés (Guillermina Valdés)	Freestyle (Disco)	«Stayin' Alive» (Bee Gees)	43 (10, 9, 9, 7, 8)
14 September	José María Peña & Florencia Díaz (Guillermina Valdés)	Freestyle (Jazz)	«Eye of the Tiger» (Survivor)	13 (1, 5, 4, 2, 1)
15 September	Noelia Marzol & Jonathan Lazarte (Hernán Piquín)	Ballroom rumba	«Inolvidable» (Luis Miguel)	49 (10, 9, 10, 10, 10)
15 September	Nazareno Móttola (Note: In replacement of Rodrigo Tapari (who could not dance due to injury).) & Sol Beatriz (Guillermina Valdés)	Freestyle (Jazz)	«Another One Bites the Dust» (Queen)	37 (9, 7, 9, 5, 7)
16 September	Viviana Saccone & Ernesto Díaz (Ángel de Brito)	Folk music (Chacarera)	«Chacarera del violín» (Néstor Garnica)	47 (10, 9, 9, 9, 10)
16 September	Ezequiel Cwirkaluk & Bárbara Silenzi (Jimena Barón)	Rock and roll	«(I Can't Get No) Satisfaction» (The Rolling Stones)	26 (4, 5, 6, 6, 5)
16 September	Candela Ruggeri & Nicolás Fleitas (Hernán Piquín)	Hip-hop	«Thrift Shop» (Macklemore & Ryan Lewis feat. Wanz)	46 (10, 9, 10, 7, 10)
16 September	Celeste Muriega & Maximiliano Diorio (Jimena Barón)	Merengue	«El Makinon» (Karol G & Mariah Angeliq)	47 (9, 9, 10, 9, 10)
17 September	Luciana Salazar & Jorge Moliniers (Carolina Ardohain)	Tango	«El tango de Roxanne» (Ewan McGregor, José Feliciano & Jacek Koman)	28 (7, 6, 6, 5, 4)
17 September	Lizardo Ponce & Josefina Oriozabala (Jimena Barón)	Urban	«In da Getto» (J Balvin & Skrillex)	41 (9, 7, 10, 8, 7)
17 September	Mario Guerci & Soledad Bayona (Carolina Ardohain)	Ballroom cha-cha	«Break My Heart» (Dua Lipa)	34 (5, 9, 3, 7, 10)
17 September	Lionel Ferro & Camila Lonigro (Guillermina Valdés)	Freestyle (Jazz)	«The Greatest Show» (Hugh Jackman, Keala Settle, Zac Efron & Zendaya)	24 (5, 6, 3, 6, 4)

The duel
Date	Couple	Act	Result
20 September	José María Peña & Florencia Díaz	His presentation was titled: "The James Bond of the conurbano"; where they performed a fusion of dance with fighting and espionage acting. His presentation had as a guest: Abel Garay (acrobat, sportsman & dancer) and Pablo Kun Castro (acrobat, dancer & artist martial). Song Mix: «James Bond Theme» (John Barry & Orchestra) «Alone (Instrumental)» (Sistar)	Bottom two (63.4%)
20 September	Ezequiel Cwirkaluk & Bárbara Silenzi	His presentation was titled: "Battle of love"; where Cwirkaluk sang live and Silenzi performed (with the guest dancer) a danced routine combining jazz and contemporary. His presentation had as a guest: Mike Velasquez (dancer & choreographer) and a mariachi group. Song «Mucho corazón» (Luis Miguel)	Eliminated (36.6%)
20 September	Lionel Ferro & Camila Lonigro	His presentation was titled: "Night of trap". Their performance was a combination of singing and dancing. His dancer had as a guest: Delfina Ternavasio (dancer) and Florencia Díaz (dancer & choreographer —not to be confused with José María Peña's professional—). Song Mix: «Loca» (Khea feat. Duki & Cazzu) «Animal» (María Becerra & Cazzu)	1st (and only) couple saved

Blue numbers indicate the lowest score
Green numbers indicate the highest score

Sentenced
Saved by the judges
Saved by the audience
Eliminated

=== Round 14: "Superduel II" ===
"Superduel II" method

- In this round, the 15 competing couples will face each other in individual duels (that is, one couple will face another) and those crosses will be defined by the average of the scores obtained in all the dances performed so far. As the number of competing couples is odd, there was a duel of three couples.
- The duels will be conformed as follows:

First duel
#1: average 1 vs. average 15
#2: average 2 vs. average 14
#3: average 3 vs. average 13
#4: average 4 vs. average 12
#5: average 5 vs. average 11
#6: average 6 vs. average 10
#7: average 7 vs. average 8 vs. average 9

Second duel
#8: loser of #1 vs. loser of #3
#9: loser of #2 vs. loser of #4 vs. loser of #6
#10: loser of #5 vs. loser of #7

Third duel
#11: loser of #8 vs. loser of #9 vs. loser of #10

- Each judge will choose one (or two) of two (or three) couples. The couple with the most votes will advance to the next round and the remaining couple will continue into the next match. Until the last three couples remain, where the eliminated couple of this round will be defined.
- The "Superduel" will have 3 stages:
  - Top 15: In this round all the couples that are still in competition will dance; will present a choreography by adagio.
  - Bottom 7: At this stage only the worst 7 couples from the Top 15 will be presented; will perform again their choreography of argentine cumbia.
  - Bottom 3: This is the last stage of the "Superduel", where a couple will be eliminated. The three worst couples will have to dance a choreography of salsa.

==== Average score chart ====
This table only counts dances scored on a 40 and 50-point scale.

Rank by average	Couple	Total points	Number of dances	Average
1	Celeste Muriega & Maximiliano Diorio	176	4	44.0
2	Rodrigo Tapari & Sol Beatriz	160	4	40.0
3	Florencia Vigna & Facundo Mazzei	446	12	37.2
4	Agustín Sierra & Fiorella Giménez	443	12	36.9
5	Julieta Nair Calvo & Gonzalo Gerber	424	12	35.3
6	Noelia Marzol & Jonathan Lazarte	395 (Note: The points accumulated by Angela Leiva are added.)	12	32.9
7	Candela Ruggeri & Nicolás Fleitas	390	12	32.5
8	Lionel Ferro & Camila Lonigro	128	4	32.0
9	Viviana Saccone & Ernesto Díaz	354	12	29.5
10	Karina Tejeda & Rafael Muñiz	353	12	29.4
11	Lizardo Ponce & Josefina Oriozabala	341	12	28.4
12	Mario Guerci & Soledad Bayona	332	12	27.7
13	Rocío Marengo & Ignacio Pérez Cortés	327	12	27.3
14	Luciana Salazar & Jorge Moliniers	325	12	27.08
15	José María Peña & Florencia Díaz	283	12	23.6

Key
Eliminated	Saved by the judges	Sentenced for the next duel	: The point is for the couple. : The point is not for the couple.

== == First duel: Adagio == ==
Running order

Song and scores
Date	# (Note: The order of face-offs was altered by decision of Marcelo Tinelli, who decided which couples danced on that date.)	Couple	Song	Scores
21 September	1	Celeste Muriega & Maximiliano Diorio	«Fix You» (Coldplay)	2
21 September	1	José María Peña & Florencia Díaz	«No Me Ames» (Jennifer Lopez & Marc Anthony)	3
22 September
22 September	6	Noelia Marzol & Jonathan Lazarte	«Never Tear Us Apart» (INXS)	3
22 September	6	Karina Tejeda & Rafael Muñiz	«Drivers License» (Olivia Rodrigo) (Note: Sung live by Sol Cwirkaluk (Karina's daughter).)	2
22 September	3	Florencia Vigna & Facundo Mazzei	«Persiana americana» (Soda Stereo)	2
22 September	3	Rocío Marengo & Ignacio Pérez Cortés	«Shallow» (Lady Gaga & Bradley Cooper)	3
23 September
23 September	5	Julieta Nair Calvo & Gonzalo Gerber	«Someone Like You» (Adele)	4
23 September	5	Lizardo Ponce & Josefina Oriozabala	«I Don't Want to Miss a Thing» (Aerosmith)	1
23 September	4	Agustín Sierra & Fiorella Giménez	«Fallin'» (Alicia Keys)	0
23 September	4	Mario Guerci & Soledad Bayona	«Porque yo te amo» (Lali Espósito)	5
23 September	2	Rodrigo Tapari & Sol Beatriz	«Stay with Me» (Sam Smith)	2
23 September	2	Luciana Salazar & Jorge Moliniers	«Love Me like You Do» (Ellie Goulding)	3
24 September
24 September	7	Candela Ruggeri & Nicolás Fleitas	«La Incondicional» (Luis Miguel)	2
24 September	7	Lionel Ferro & Camila Lonigro	«Don't Cry» (Guns N' Roses)	1
24 September	7	Viviana Saccone & Ernesto Díaz	«Te quiero, te quiero» (Gerónimo Rauch)	2

Second duel (Argentine cumbia)
Third duel (Salsa)

(The second and third duel were suspended due to the resignation of Florencia Vigna and Facundo Mazzei for personal reasons and injury, respectively)

On 24 September, during the second duel, Mazzei suffered an injury while performing the choreography, for this reason they could not finish dancing it; and they were sent directly to the third duel, where Mazzei would be replaced. Celeste Muriega and Maximiliano Diorio, the couple facing off against Vigna and Mazzei, were automatically saved by the production. Subsequently, face-off 9 was held, where Agustín Sierra & Fiorella Giménez and Karina Tejeda & Rafael Muñiz advanced to the next round by decision of the judges and Rodrigo Tapari & Sol Beatriz were sentenced to face-off 11. Due to lack of time, it was pending the face-off 9 (Lionel Ferro & Camila Lonigro versus Lizardo Ponce & Josefina Oriozabala) and the execution of the third duel (the last face-off, number 11).

On 27 September, Florencia Vigna and Facundo Mazzei announced their retirement from the competition. Therefore, the production decided to save the couples that were still in the second or third duel (Lionel Ferro & Camila Lonigro, Lizardo Ponce & Josefina Oriozabala and Rodrigo Tapari & Sol Beatriz)

Notes
On 23 and 24 September, Jimena Barón was absent from the judges' stand for work reasons. In his place was Lourdes Sánchez.

=== Round 15: "Dancing with guest singers" ===
In this round, the couples had the special participation of a professional singer.

It is not obligation that both the celebrity and the professional sing, they still have the possibility to perform it. The couples can choose whether to sing or dance or both. The special guest has to sing, but can also dance.

The singing must be performed live and they can sing more than one song, if they wish.

Running order

Song and scores
Date	Couple (Guest singer)	Song	Scores
27 September	Julieta Nair Calvo & Gonzalo Gerber (Rocío Igarzábal)	«Proud Mary» (Tina Turner)	44 (10, 7, 9, 8, 10)
28 September	Noelia Marzol & Jonathan Lazarte (Germán Tripel)	«Beggin'» (Måneskin)	30 (5, 6, 8, 6, 5)
28 September	Nazareno Móttola & Micaela Grimoldi (Martín Pampiglione)	Mix: «Nadie es perfecto» / «Asado y fernet» (Los Caligaris)	24 (4, 5, 5, 5, 5)
28 September	Mario Guerci & Soledad Bayona (Patricio Guevara)	Mix: «You Give Love a Bad Name» / «It's My Life» (Bon Jovi)	33 (4, 6, 10, 6, 7)
29 September	Agustín Sierra & Fiorella Giménez (Mery Granados)	«Chandelier» (Sia)	34 (4, 9, 7, 7, 7)
29 September	José María Peña & Florencia Díaz (Patricio Witis)	«No me dejan salir» (Charly García)	25 (10, 5, 5, 2, 3)
29 September	Lizardo Ponce & Josefina Oriozabala (Florencia Anca)	«Get Right» (Jennifer Lopez)	23 (3, 5, 6, 5, 4)
30 September	Agustín Barajas & Loana Ruiz (Ivana Rossi)	«Lágrimas negras» (Compay Segundo)	42 (4, 10, 10, 8, 10)
30 September	Viviana Saccone & Ernesto Díaz (Marcela Morelo)	Mix: «Corazón salvaje» / «Ponernos de acuerdo» / «La fuerza del engaño» (Marcela Morelo)	39 (10, 7, 9, 6, 7)
1 October	Karina Tejeda & Rafael Muñiz (Felipe Herrera)	«It's a Man's Man's Man's World» (James Brown)	43 (10, 8, 10, 8, 7)
1 October	Candela Ruggeri & Nicolás Fleitas (Melina Lezcano)	«Crazy in Love» (Beyoncé)	40 (10, 6, 9, 8, 7)
1 October	Celeste Muriega & Maximiliano Diorio (Lowrdes)	Mix: «Maldita noche» / «Como puede ser» / «Guapas» (Bandana)	50 (10, 10, 10, 10, 10)
4 October	Rodrigo Tapari & Sol Beatriz (Heidy Viciedo)	«Vivir lo nuestro» (Marc Anthony & La India)	41 (9, 7, 9, 8, 8)
4 October	Rocío Marengo & Ignacio Pérez Cortés (Natalia Cociuffo)	Mix: «All That Jazz» (from Chicago) «Cabaret (in Spanish)» (from Cabaret)	47 (10, 9, 10, 9, 9)
5 October	Luciana Salazar & Ignacio Gonatta (Note: In replacement of Jorge Moliniers (who could not dance due to injury).) (Belén Cabrera)	Mix: «I Will Survive» / «Never Can Say Goodbye» (Gloria Gaynor) «Last Dance» (Donna Summer)	35 (4, 7, 8, 8, 8)
5 October	Lionel Ferro & Camila Lonigro (Chule Von Wernich)	Mix: «Treasure» (Bruno Mars) «Uptown Funk» (Mark Ronson feat. Bruno Mars)	25 (3, 6, 6, 5, 5)

The duel
Date	Couple	Act	Result
6 October	Nazareno Móttola & Micaela Grimoldi	They performed a danced routine combining jazz and pasodoble, inspired by the film Pirates of the Caribbean. They also included acting moments. Song «He's a Pirate» (Klaus Badelt & Hans Zimmer)	2nd couple saved
6 October	José María Peña & Florencia Díaz	His presentation was titled as: "We went back to the 80s" where performed a danced routine combining jazz and disco. Song «Groove Is in the Heart» (Deee-Lite)	1st couple saved
6 October	Lizardo Ponce & Josefina Oriozabala	His presentation was titled as: "Challenge achieved" where three different dance thematics were proposed. They had the participation of six dancers from the La Academia's sttaf, the choreographers chiefs and Martín Salwe as voice-over. Song Mix: «¿Qué más pues?» (J Balvin & María Becerra) «Wannabe» (Spice Girls) «Livin' la Vida Loca» (Ricky Martin)	Bottom two (Last to be called safe)
6 October	Lionel Ferro & Camila Lonigro	They performed a street dance. In addition, Ferro performed lip sync (the singing voice were previously recorded) in Spanish. They were accompanied by two invited dancers (Facundo Insúa —Julieta Puente's former professional— and Maité Demarchi). Song «Yummy» (Justin Bieber)	Eliminated
Judges' votes to save (Bottom two): de Brito: Lionel Ferro & Camila Lonigro; Ardohain: Lizardo Ponce & Josefina Oriozabala; Valdés: Lizardo Ponce & Josefina Oriozabala; Barón: Lizardo Ponce & Josefina Oriozabala; Piquín: Lizardo Ponce & Josefina Oriozabala; Result Lionel Ferro & Camila Lonigro (1 vote) Lizardo Ponce & Josefina Oriozabala (4 votes)

Blue numbers indicate the lowest score
Green numbers indicate the highest score

Sentenced
Saved by the judges
Eliminated
Withdrew

=== Round 16: "Dancing with dancers children" ===
In this round, the couples will be accompanied by a dancer child.

Running order

Song and scores
Date	Couple (Guest Dancer Children)	Song	Scores
7 October	Karina Tejeda & Rafael Muñiz (Xiomara Teseira)	«Run the World (Girls)» (Beyoncé)	47 (8, 10, 10, 10, 9)
7 October	Rocío Igarzábal & Gonzalo Gerber (Oriana Ledesma)	«Can't Stop the Feeling!» (Justin Timberlake)	46 (8, 10, 10, 9, 9)
8 October	Agustín Sierra & Fiorella Giménez (Maitena "Kuky" Romero Cabral)	«16 shots» (Stefflon Don)	49 (10, 10, 10, 9, 10)
8 October	Celeste Muriega & Maximiliano Diorio (Julieta Clara Ledesma)	Mix: «Jenny from the Block» (Jennifer Lopez feat. Jadakiss & Styles) «Love Don't Cost a Thing» (Jennifer Lopez)	43 (9, 9, 9, 8, 8)
11 October	Agustín Barajas & Loana Ruiz (Martina Gallo)	«Fulanito» (Becky G & El Alfa)	41 (8, 8, 9, 7, 9)
11 October	Candela Ruggeri & Nicolás Fleitas (Sofía Ifrán)	«Sorry» (Justin Bieber)	41 (9, 8, 10, 7, 7)
12 October	Rodrigo Tapari & Sol Beatriz (Luz Lambre)	«I Like to Move It» (Reel 2 Real feat. The Mad Stuntman)	50 (10, 10, 10, 10, 10)
12 October	Noelia Marzol & Jonathan Lazarte (Thiago Bogado)	«Happy» (Pharrell Williams)	49 (10, 9, 10, 10, 10)
13 October	Rocío Marengo & Ignacio Pérez Cortés (Josefina Currado)	«Let's Get It Started» (Måneskin)	42 (10, 9, 8, 7, 8)
13 October	Lizardo Ponce & Josefina Oriozabala (Juan Bautista Leyva)	«Duele» (Tini & John C.)	39 (7, 8, 8, 8, 8)
14 October	Viviana Saccone & Ernesto Díaz (Zoe Domínguez)	«Finesse» (Bruno Mars feat. Cardi B)	46 (9, 9, 10, 9, 9)
14 October	José María Peña & Florencia Díaz (Nicolás Fernández)	«24K Magic» (Bruno Mars)	48 (10, 10, 10, 9, 9)
15 October	Luciana Salazar & Ignacio Gonatta (Note: In replacement of Jorge Moliniers (who could not dance due to injury).) (Isabella Marrone & Matilda Salazar)	«Made for Now» (Janet Jackson & Daddy Yankee)	33 (9, 8, 9, —, (Note: Because she withdrew the competition before the sentence, the secret vote was not announced.) 7)
15 October	Nazareno Móttola & Micaela Grimoldi (Celeste López)	«Industry Baby» (Lil Nas X & Jack Harlow)	39 (7, 7, 10, 8, 7)
18 October	Mario Guerci & Soledad Bayona (Dylan Dalceggio)	«I Gotta Feeling» (The Black Eyed Peas)	47 (10, 10, 10, 8, 9)

The duel
Date	Couple	Act	Result
19 October	Agustín Barajas & Loana Ruiz	They performed a Latin pop dance. Song «The Cup of Life» (Ricky Martin) «Salomé» (Chayanne)	1st couple saved
19 October	Candela Ruggeri & Nicolás Fleitas	They performed an Acrobatic dance. Song «Rewrite the Stars» (Zac Efron & Zendaya)	Bottom two (57.2%)
19 October	Lizardo Ponce & Josefina Oriozabala	They performed a dance with the song of the movie Grease. Song «You're the One That I Want» (John Travolta & Olivia Newton-John)	2nd couple saved
19 October	Nazareno Móttola & Micaela Grimoldi	They performed a dance with the songs of the movie The Mask. Song «The Business of Love» (Domino) «Hey Pachuco» (The Modern Ballroom Dance Band)	Eliminated (42.8%)

Blue numbers indicate the lowest score
Green numbers indicate the highest score

Sentenced
Saved by the judges
Saved by the audience
Eliminated
Withdrew

=== Round 17: Tributes ===
Running order

Song and scores
Date	Couple	Tribute	Song	Scores
20 October	Karina Tejada & Rafael Muñiz	Argentine tango	Mix: «Yo tuviera un corazón» (Mario Visconti) «El día que me quieras» (Carlos Gardel)	28 (4, 7, 10, 7, — (Note: Because she withdrew the competition before the sentence, the secret vote was not announced.))
20 October	Rocío Marengo & Ignacio Pérez Cortés	Sergio Denis	Mix: «Gigante, chiquito» «Nada hará cambiar mi amor por ti» «Un poco loco» «Como estás, amor» «Te quiero tanto» (Sergio Denis)	30 (4, 7, 6, 5, 8)
21 October	Agustín Sierra & Fiorella Giménez	Mothers	Mix: «Disfruto» (Carla Morrison) «Las manos de mi madre» (Peteco Carabajal)	43 (10, 9, 8, 8, 8)
21 October	Noelia Marzol & Jonathan Lazarte	René Favaloro	«Adiós Nonino» (Ástor Piazzolla)	48 (8, 10, 10, 10, 10)
22 October	Rodrigo Tapari & Sol Beatriz	Selena	Mix: «Amor Prohibido» «Como la Flor» (Selena)	35 (5, 7, 7, 9, 7)
22 October	José María Peña & Florencia Díaz	Quino	Mix: «Here Comes the Sun» «Can't Buy Me Love» «Let It Be» (The Beatles)	37 (4, 7, 10, 9, 7)
25 October	Agustín Barajas & Loana Ruiz	Argentine Folklore	Mix: «Sin principio ni final» (Los Nocheros) «Chacarera de las piedras» (Atahualpa Yupanqui) «Argentine National Anthem» (Vicente López y Planes & Blas Parera)	37 (4, 8, 7, 8, 10)
25 October	Mario Guerci & Soledad Bayona	Argentine Olympians	Mix: «The Final Countdown» (Europe) «Reach» (Gloria Estefan)	35 (8, 8, 8, 5, 6)
26 October	Rocío Igarzábal & Gonzalo Gerber	Mercedes Sosa	Mix: «Alfonsina y el mar» (Mercedes Sosa) «Yo vengo a ofrecer mi corazón» (Fito Páez) «Como la cigarra» (María Elena Walsh)	48 (10, 10, 10, 9, 9)
26 October	Celeste Muriega & Maximiliano Diorio	Ricardo Fort	Mix: «Tengo» (Sandro de América) «Colgando en tus manos» (Carlos Baute feat. Marta Sánchez) «¿A quién le importa?» (Alaska y Dinarama)	32 (4, 7, 8, 6, 7)
27 October	Viviana Saccone & Ernesto Díaz	Ástor Piazzolla	«Verano porteño» (Ástor Piazzolla)	43 (8, 8, 9, 9, 9)
27 October	Candela Ruggeri & Nicolás Fleitas	Gustavo Cerati	Mix: «Te hacen falta vitaminas» «En la Ciudad de la Furia» «Canción Animal» (Soda Stereo)	39 (8, 8, 8, 8, 7)
28 October	Lizardo Ponce & Josefina Oriozabala	LGBT	«I Want to Break Free» (Queen)	39 (4, 7, 10, 10, 8)

The duel
Date	Couple	Act	Result
29 October	Rocío Marengo & Ignacio Pérez Cortés	They performed a Cabaret dance. Song «Feeling Good» (Nina Simone)	Bottom two (Last to be called safe)
29 October	Rodrigo Tapari & Sol Beatriz	They performed acrobatics dance and Singing. Song «(Everything I Do) I Do It for You» (Bryan Adams)	Eliminated
29 October	Mario Guerci & Soledad Bayona	They performed acrobatics dance. Song «Supremacy» (Muse)	1st couple saved
29 October	Celeste Muriega & Maximiliano Diorio	They performed a Lambada dance. Song «Chorando se foi» (Kaoma)	2nd couple saved
Judges' votes to save (Bottom two): de Brito: Rocío Marengo & Ignacio Pérez Cortés; Ardohain: Rodrigo Tapari & Sol Beatriz; Valdés: Rodrigo Tapari & Sol Beatriz; Barón: Rocío Marengo & Ignacio Pérez Cortés; Piquín: Rocío Marengo & Ignacio Pérez Cortés; Result Rodrigo Tapari & Sol Beatriz (2 vote) Rocío Marengo & Ignacio Pérez Cortés (3 votes)

Blue numbers indicate the lowest score
Green numbers indicate the highest score

Sentenced
Saved by the judges
Eliminated
Withdrew

=== Round 18: Rock and roll ===
On 2 to 5 November, Jimena Barón did not attend the program for personal reasons. In her place was the dancer, TV host, former participant and former BAR judge Lourdes Sánchez.

Running order

Song and scores
Date	Couple	Song	Scores
29 October	Agustín Barajas & Loana Ruiz	«Don't Stop Me Now» (Queen)	37 (4, 8, 8, 8, 9)
1 November	Agustín Sierra & Fiorella Giménez	«Hound Dog» (Big Mama Thornton)	48 (8, 10, 10, 10, 10)
1 November	Lizardo Ponce & Josefina Oriozabala	«Rock Around the Clock» (Bill Haley & His Comets)	42 (6, 10, 10, 8, 8)
2 November	Rocío Igarzábal & Gonzalo Gerber	«Hit Me with Your Best Shot» (Pat Benatar)	36 (5, 8, 9, 7, 7)
2 November	Rocío Marengo & Ignacio Pérez Cortés	«Great Balls of Fire» (Jerry Lee Lewis)	43 (8, 7, 9, 10, 9)
3 November	Noelia Marzol & Jonathan Lazarte	«Travelin' Band» (Creedence Clearwater Revival)	47 (10, 10, 10, 8, 9)
3 November	José María Peña & Florencia Díaz	«Rock-A-Beatin' Boogie» (Bill Haley & His Comets)	35 (7, 8, 10, 5, 5)
4 November	Viviana Saccone & Ernesto Díaz	«This Cat's on a Hot Tin Roof» (The Brian Setzer Orchestra)	34 (5, 7, 7, 8, 7)
4 November	Candela Ruggeri & Nicolás Fleitas	«Footloose» (Kenny Loggins)	45 (8, 8, 10, 10, 9)
5 November	Celeste Muriega & Maximiliano Diorio	«Wake Me Up Before You Go-Go» (Wham!)	46 (7, 10, 10, 10, 9)
5 November	Mario Guerci & Soledad Bayona	«Blue Suede Shoes» (Carl Perkins)	36 (6, 9, 8, 6, 7)

The duel
Date	Couple	Act	Result
8 November	Rocío Igarzábal & Gonzalo Gerber	They performed a dance inspired by the movie Fifty Shades of Grey. Song «I Got You (I Feel Good)» (James Brown)	2nd couple saved
8 November	José María Peña & Florencia Díaz	They performed a German Folklore dance. Song «Vals Tradicional» (Los Waigandt) «Beer Barrel Polka» (Jaromír Vejvoda)	Bottom two (55.7%)
8 November	Viviana Saccone & Ernesto Díaz	They performed an Argentinian Folklore dance. Song «Mujer, niña y amiga» (Robustiano Figueroa Reyes)	Eliminated (44.3%)
8 November	Mario Guerci & Soledad Bayona	They performed an Adagio dance. Song «Losing My Religion» (R.E.M.)	1st couple saved

Blue numbers indicate the lowest score
Green numbers indicate the highest score

Sentenced
Saved by the judges
Saved by the audience
Eliminated

=== Round 19: Merengue ===
On 9 November, Carolina Ardohaín did not attend the program due to another work commitment. In her place was the dancer, TV host, former participant and former BAR judge Lourdes Sánchez.

Running order

Song and scores
Date	Couple	Song	Scores
9 November	Agustín Sierra & Fiorella Giménez	«Muévelo» (Jandy Ventura & Los Potros)	35 (5, 7, 8, 7, 8)
9 November	Agustín Barajas & Loana Ruiz	«Es mentiroso» (Olga Tañón)	33 (3, 8, 8, 6, 8)
10 November	Noelia Marzol & Jonathan Lazarte	«El mismo calor» (Banda XXI)	50 (10, 10, 10, 10, 10)
10 November	Lizardo Ponce & Josefina Oriozabala	«La Mordidita» (Ricky Martin feat. Yotuel)	31 (4, 7, 8, 6, 6)
11 November	Celeste Muriega& Maximiliano Diorio	«Chica sexy» (Banda XXI)	35 (4, 8, 8, 7, 8)
11 November	Mario Guerci & Soledad Bayona	«Tu Sonrisa» (Elvis Crespo)	21 (0, 6, 5, 5, 5)
12 November	Candela Ruggeri & Nicolás Fleitas	«Rompe cintura» (Los Hermanos Rosario)	37 (4, 8, 8, 9, 8)
12 November	José María Peña & Florencia Díaz	«La dueña del swing» (Los Hermanos Rosario)	21 (3, 5, 7, 3, 3)
15 November	Rocío Marengo & Ignacio Pérez Cortés	«Abusadora» (Wilfrido Vargas)	35 (5, 7, 8, 8, 7)
15 November	Rocío Igarzábal & Gonzalo Gerber	«Esa chica tiene swing» (Banda XXI)	27 (4, 6, 7, 5, 5)

The duel
Date	Couple	Act	Result
16 November	Lizardo Ponce & Josefina Oriozabala	They performed a Country music dance. Song «Honey, I'm Good» (Andy Grammer)	1st couple saved
16 November	Mario Guerci & Soledad Bayona	They performed an acrobatic dance. Songs Mix: «Can't Help Falling in Love» (Elvis Presley) «You?» (Two Feet)	2nd couple saved
16 November	José María Peña & Florencia Díaz	They performed a romantic Adagio dance. Song «Para decir adiós» (Danny Rivera & Eydie Gormé)	Eliminated
16 November	Rocío Igarzábal & Gonzalo Gerber	Singing Song «El día que me quieras» (Carlos Gardel)	Bottom two (Last to be called safe)
Judges' votes to save (Bottom two): de Brito: José María Peña & Florencia Díaz; Ardohain: Rocío Igarzábal & Gonzalo Gerber; Valdés: Rocío Igarzábal & Gonzalo Gerber; Barón: Rocío Igarzábal & Gonzalo Gerber; Piquín: Rocío Igarzábal & Gonzalo Gerber; Result José María Peña & Florencia Díaz (1 vote) Rocío Igarzábal & Gonzalo Gerber (4 votes)

Blue numbers indicate the lowest score
Green numbers indicate the highest score

Sentenced
Saved by the judges
Eliminated

=== Round 20: "Musical theatre" ===
In this round there will be double elimination.

Running order

Song and scores
Date	Couple	Musical	Song	Scores
17 November	Noelia Marzol & Jonathan Lazarte	Moulin Rouge!	Mix: «Lady Marmalade (Moulin Rouge version)» (Christina Aguilera, Lil' Kim, Mýa & Pink) «El tango de Roxanne» (Ewan McGregor, Jacek Koman & José Feliciano) «Because We Can» (Bon Jovi)	43 (9, 10, 10, 6, 8)
17 November	Candela Ruggeri & Nicolás Fleitas	Mamma Mia!	Mix: «I Have a Dream» «Mamma Mia» «Dancing Queen» (ABBA)	33 (4, 5, 8, 9, 7)
18 November	Agustín Sierra & Fiorella Giménez	Sweet Charity	Mix: «The Rich Man's Frug» (Orquesta Sinfónica Nacional de Estados Unidos) «The Rhythm of Life» (Diana Ross & the Supremes & The Temptations) «Big Spender» (Shirley Bassey)	33 (5, 8, 8, 6, 6)
18 November	Celeste Muriega & Maximiliano Diorio	Hairspray	Mix: «Good Morning Baltimore» (Nikki Blonsky) «The Nicest Kids in Town» (James Marsden) «You Can't Stop the Beat» (Nikki Blonsky, Zac Efron, Amanda Bynes, Elijah Kelley, John Travolta, Michelle Pfeiffer, Brittany Snow & James Marsden)	49 (10, 10, 9, 10, 10)
19 November	Agustín Barajas & Loana Ruiz	La La Land	Mix: «City of Stars» «A Lovely Night» (Ryan Gosling & Emma Stone) «Planetarium» (Justin Hurwitz) «Another Day of Sun» (Cast of La La Land)	37 (5, 8, 8, 7, 9)
19 November	Rocío Marengo & Ignacio Pérez Cortés	Priscilla, Queen of the Desert	Mix: «I Say a Little Prayer» (Dionne Warwick) «Go West» (Village People) «It's Raining Men» (The Weather Girls)	33 (3, 6, 8, 7, 9)
22 November	Rocío Igarzábal & Gonzalo Gerber	Evita	Mix: «Buenos Aires» (Manuel Jovés) «Santa Evita» (Andrew Lloyd Webber) «Don't Cry for Me Argentina» (Julie Covington)	42 (7, 10, 9, 8, 8)
22 November	Lizardo Ponce & Josefina Oriozabala	Aladdin	Mix: «One Jump Ahead» (Brad Kane) «Arabian Nights» (Bruce Adler) «Friend Like Me» (Robin Williams) «A Whole New World» (Brad Kane & Lea Salonga)	27 (0, 8, 8, 6, 5)
23 November	Mario Guerci & Soledad Bayona	Rock of Ages	Mix: «Here I Go Again» (Whitesnake) «More Than Words» (Extreme) «Don't Stop Believin'» (Journey)	40 (9, 7, 10, 7, 7)

The duel
Date	Couple	Act	Result
24 November	Candela Ruggeri & Nicolás Fleitas	They performed a dance inspired by the movie Burlesque. Song «Show Me How You Burlesque» (Christina Aguilera)	2nd couple saved
24 November	Agustín Sierra & Fiorella Giménez	They performed an Argentine tango. Song «Santa María (del buen ayre)» (Gotan Project)	1st couple saved
24 November	Agustín Barajas & Loana Ruiz	They performed Adagio a dance. Song «Cuando nadie me ve» (Alejandro Sanz)	Bottom two (39.7%)
24 November	Rocío Marengo & Ignacio Pérez Cortés	They performed a Charleston dance. Song Mix: «Don't Stop 'Til You Get Enough» (Michael Jackson) «Blame It on the Boogie» «Shake Your Body (Down to the Ground)» (The Jackson 5)	Eliminated (23.3%)
24 November	Lizardo Ponce & Josefina Oriozabala	They performed a Dance-pop. Song «Pop» (NSYNC)	Eliminated (37.0%)

Blue numbers indicate the lowest score

Green numbers indicate the highest score

Sentenced
Saved by the judges
Saved by the audience
Eliminated

=== Round 21: Urban dance ===
Running order

Song and scores
Date	Couple	Song	Scores
25 November	Noelia Marzol & Jonathan Lazarte	Mix: «Anaconda» (Nicki Minaj) «Level Up» (Ciara)	39 (7, 10, 9, 6, 7)
25 November	Celeste Muriega & Maximiliano Diorio	Mix: «Bitch Better Have My Money» (Rihanna) «Work» (Rihanna feat. Drake) «Where Have You Been» (Rihanna)	44 (8, 10, 10, 8, 8)
26 November	Rocío Igarzábal & Gonzalo Gerber	Mix: «Formation» (Beyoncé) «Uptown Funk» (Mark Ronson feat. Bruno Mars) «Crazy in Love» (Beyoncé feat. Jay-Z)	30 (4, 7, 8, 5, 6)
26 November	Mario Guerci & Soledad Bayona	«Sal y perrea (Remix)» (Sech, Daddy Yankee & J Balvin)	21 (3, 5, 5, 3, 5)
29 November	Agustín Sierra & Fiorella Giménez	«Whine & Kotch» (Charly Black & J Capri)	45 (10, 10, 10, 7, 8)
29 November	Candela Ruggeri & Nicolás Fleitas	«Ptazeta: Bzrp Music Sessions, Vol. 45» (Bizarrap & Ptazeta)	49 (10, 10, 10, 9, 10)
30 November	Agustín Barajas & Loana Ruiz	«Turn Up the Music» (Chris Brown feat. Rihanna)	39 (7, 8, 8, 7, 9)

The duel
Date	Couple	Act	Result
1 December	Noelia Marzol & Jonathan Lazarte	They performed an Adagio dance. Song «Amor Prohibido» (Selena)	Bottom two (62.1%)
1 December	Rocío Igarzábal & Gonzalo Gerber	They performed a dance with Musical instrument. Song «+1» (Martin Solveig feat. Sam White)	Eliminated (37.9%)
1 December	Mario Guerci & Soledad Bayona	They performed a dance inspired by Chinese culture. Song Mix: «Mulan Leaves Home» (Harry Gregson-Williams) «To Know My Enemy» (Hans Zimmer)	1st couple saved
1 December	Agustín Barajas & Loana Ruiz	They performed an Argentine tango. Song «El verano» (Ara Malikian)	2nd couple saved

Blue numbers indicate the lowest score
Green numbers indicate the highest score

Sentenced
Saved by the judges
Saved by the audience
Eliminated

=== Round 22: Film Music ===
Running order

Song and scores
Date	Couple	Movie	Song	Scores
2 December	Agustín Sierra & Fiorella Giménez	Bohemian Rhapsody	Mix: «We Will Rock You» / «Don't Stop Me Now» / «Bohemian Rhapsody» (Queen)	29 (4, 8, 6, 5, 6)
2 December	Celeste Muriega & Maximiliano Diorio	My Best Friend's Wedding	«I Say a Little Prayer» (Dionne Warwick)	33 (5, 7, 10, 5, 6)
3 December	Noelia Marzol & Jonathan Lazarte	James Bond	Mix: «The Name's Bond... James Bond» (David Arnold) «Skyfall» (Adele)	50 (10, 10, 10, 10, 10)
3 December	Candela Ruggeri & Nicolás Fleitas	Men in Black	«Men in Black» (Will Smith)	30 (4, 8, 8, 5, 5)
6 December	Agustín Barajas & Loana Ruiz	Singin' in the Rain	Mix: «Good Morning» (Judy Garland & Mickey Rooney) «Singin' in the Rain» (Gene Kelly)	33 (2, 8, 7, 6, 10)
6 December	Mario Guerci & Soledad Bayona	Tango feroz: la leyenda de Tanguito	Mix: «Tango feroz» / «El amor es más fuerte» (Ulises Butrón)	30 (3, 7, 7, 6, 7)

The duel
Date	Couple	Act	Result
7 December	Agustín Sierra & Fiorella Giménez	They performed a dance to raise awareness about Bullying. Song «Believer» (Imagine Dragons)	Bottom two (65.0%)
7 December	Celeste Muriega & Maximiliano Diorio	They performed an Urban dance. Song «Problema» (Daddy Yankee)	1st couple saved
7 December	Candela Ruggeri & Nicolás Fleitas	They performed a Salsa dance. Song «Mala mujer» (C. Tangana)	2nd couple saved
7 December	Agustín Barajas & Loana Ruiz	They performed a Swing dance. Song Mix: «Sing, Sing, Sing (With a Swing)» (Louis Prima) «Apache» (Bert Weedon)	Eliminated (22.3%)
7 December	Mario Guerci & Soledad Bayona	They performed a dance to raise awareness about Domestic violence. Song «Malo» (Bebe)	Eliminated (12.7%)

Blue numbers indicate the lowest score
Green numbers indicate the highest score

Sentenced
Saved by the judges
Saved by the audience
Eliminated

=== Semi-finals ===
==== 1st Semi-final ====
Song and scores
Date	Celebrity(s)	Style	Song	Score					Total
Date	Celebrity(s)	Style	Song	ADB	CA	GV	JB	HP	Total
First semi-final (8 December)	Noelia Marzol & Jonathan Lazarte	Cha-cha-cha	«Fireball» (Pitbull feat. John Ryan)						1
First semi-final (8 December)	Celeste Muriega & Maximiliano Diorio	Cha-cha-cha	«El Anillo» (Jennifer Lopez)						0
First semi-final (8 December)	Noelia Marzol & Jonathan Lazarte	Judges' team-up challenge/	«Inolvidable» (Luis Miguel)						1
First semi-final (8 December)	Celeste Muriega & Maximiliano Diorio	Judges' team-up challenge/	«Chorando se foi» (Kaoma)						0

Totals
Celebrity(s)	Subtotal	Telephone vote	Total
Celeste Muriega & Maximiliano Diorio	0	43.3% (0)	0
Noelia Marzol & Jonathan Lazarte	2	56.7% (2)	4

Notes

- : The point is for the couple.
- : The point is not for the couple.

Result

- Finalists: Noelia Marzol & Jonathan Lazarte
- Semi-finalist: Celeste Muriega & Maximiliano Diorio

==== 2nd Semi-final ====
Song and scores
Date	Celebrity(s)	Style	Song	Score					Total
Date	Celebrity(s)	Style	Song	ADB	CA	GV	JB	HP	Total
Second semi-final (9 December)	Agustín Sierra & Fiorella Giménez	Cha-cha-cha	«Size» (Fleur East)						1
Second semi-final (9 December)	Candela Ruggeri & Nicolás Fleitas	Cha-cha-cha	«On the Floor» (Jennifer Lopez feat. Pitbull)						0
Second semi-final (9 December)	Agustín Sierra & Fiorella Giménez	Urban dance	«Whine & Kotch» (Charly Black & J Capri)						0
Second semi-final (9 December)	Candela Ruggeri & Nicolás Fleitas	Urban dance	«Ptazeta: Bzrp Music Sessions, Vol. 45» (Bizarrap & Ptazeta)						1

Totals
Celebrity(s)	Subtotal	Telephone vote	Total
Candela Ruggeri & Nicolás Fleitas	1	31.7%	1
Agustín Sierra & Fiorella Giménez	1	68.3%	3

Notes

- : The point is for the couple.
- : The point is not for the couple.

Result

- Finalists: Agustín Sierra & Fiorella Giménez
- Semi-finalist: Candela Ruggeri & Nicolás Fleitas

=== Final ===
- Cumbia singer L-Gante, joined the state as a guest judge.

Song and scores
Date	Celebrity(s)	Style	Song	Score						Total
Date	Celebrity(s)	Style	Song	ADB	CA	EV	GV	JB	HP	Total
Final (10 December)	Noelia Marzol & Jonathan Lazarte	Rock and roll	«Travelin' Band» (Creedence Clearwater Revival)							1
Final (10 December)	Agustín Sierra & Fiorella Giménez	Rock and roll	«Hound Dog» (Big Mama Thornton)							0
Final (10 December)	Noelia Marzol & Jonathan Lazarte	Adagio	«Never Tear Us Apart» (INXS)							0
Final (10 December)	Agustín Sierra & Fiorella Giménez	Adagio	«Pilgrim» (Eric Clapton)							1
Final (10 December)	Noelia Marzol & Jonathan Lazarte	Merengue	«El mismo calor» (Banda XXI)							1
Final (10 December)	Agustín Sierra & Fiorella Giménez	Merengue	«Muévelo» (Jandy Ventura & Los Potros)							0

Totals
Celebrity(s)	Subtotal	Telephone vote	Total
Agustín Sierra & Fiorella Giménez	1	49.3%	1
Noelia Marzol & Jonathan Lazarte	2	50.7%	5

Notes

- : The point is for the couple.
- : The point is not for the couple.

Result:

- Winners: Noelia Marzol & Jonathan Lazarte
- Runner-up: Agustín Sierra & Fiorella Giménez

== Judges ==
Rounds		Judge 1	Judge 2	Judge 3	Judge 4	Judge 5
Round 1 : Double cube	18 May	Pampita	Jimena Barón	Guillermina Valdés	Hernán Piquín	-
Round 1 : Double cube	19 May	Pampita	Jimena Barón	Guillermina Valdés	Hernán Piquín	-
Round 1 : Double cube	20 May	Pampita	Jimena Barón	Guillermina Valdés	Hernán Piquín	-
Round 1 : Double cube	24 May	Pampita	Jimena Barón	Guillermina Valdés	Hernán Piquín	-
Round 1 : Double cube	25 May	Pampita	Jimena Barón	Guillermina Valdés	Hernán Piquín	-
Round 1 : Double cube	26 May	Pampita	Jimena Barón	Guillermina Valdés	Hernán Piquín	-
Round 1 : Double cube	27 May	Àngel de Brito	Pampita	Jimena Baron	Guillermina Valdes	Hernán Piquín
Round 2 : Perfect imitation	27 May	Àngel de Brito	Pampita	Jimena Baron	Hernán Piquín	-
Round 2 : Perfect imitation	31 May	Àngel de Brito	Pampita	Jimena Baron	Hernán Piquín	-
Round 2 : Perfect imitation	1 June	Àngel de Brito	Pampita	Jimena Baron	Hernán Piquín	-
Round 2 : Perfect imitation	2 June	Àngel de Brito	Pampita	Jimena Baron	Hernán Piquín	-
Round 2 : Perfect imitation	7 June	Àngel de Brito	Pampita	Jimena Baron	Hernán Piquín	-
Round 2 : Perfect imitation	9 June	Àngel de Brito	Pampita	Jimena Baron	Hernán Piquín	-
Round 2 : Perfect imitation	10 June	Àngel de Brito	Pampita	Jimena Baron	Hernán Piquín	Rossi & Frugoni
Round 3 : Shuffle dance	10 June	Àngel de Brito	Pampita	Jimena Baron	Hernán Piquín	-
Round 3 : Shuffle dance	14 June	Àngel de Brito	Pampita	Jimena Baron	Hernán Piquín	-
Round 3 : Shuffle dance	15 June	Àngel de Brito	Pampita	Jimena Baron	Hernán Piquín	-
Round 3 : Shuffle dance	16 June	Àngel de Brito	Pampita	Jimena Baron	Hernán Piquín	-
Round 3 : Shuffle dance	17 June	Àngel de Brito	Pampita	Jimena Baron	Hernán Piquín	-
Round 3 : Shuffle dance	22 June	Àngel de Brito	Pampita	Jimena Baron	Hernán Piquín	-
Round 3 : Shuffle dance	23 June	Àngel de Brito	Pampita	Jimena Baron	Hernán Piquín	-
Round 4 : Disco	23 June	Àngel de Brito	Pampita	Jimena Baron	Hernán Piquín	-
Round 4 : Disco	24 June	Àngel de Brito	Pampita	Jimena Baron	Hernán Piquín	-
Round 4 : Disco	29 June	Àngel de Brito	Pampita	Jimena Baron	Hernán Piquín	-
Round 4 : Disco	30 June	Àngel de Brito	Pampita	Jimena Baron	Hernán Piquín	-
Round 4 : Disco	1 July	Àngel de Brito	Pampita	Jimena Baron	Hernán Piquín	-
Round 4 : Disco	2 July	Àngel de Brito	Pampita	Jimena Baron	Hernán Piquín	-
Round 4 : Disco	5 July	Àngel de Brito	Pampita	Jimena Baron	Hernán Piquín	-
Round 5 : Ballroom Samba	5 July	Àngel de Brito	Pampita	Jimena Baron	Hernán Piquín	-
