= Big Daddy G =

Big Daddy G may refer to:

- Dave Glover, a Canadian blues guitarist
- Gary H. Mason, a music producer
- Big Daddy G Revue, an act associated with Richard "Hock" Walsh
