= Marcela Morelo =

Argentine singer-songwriter (born 1969)

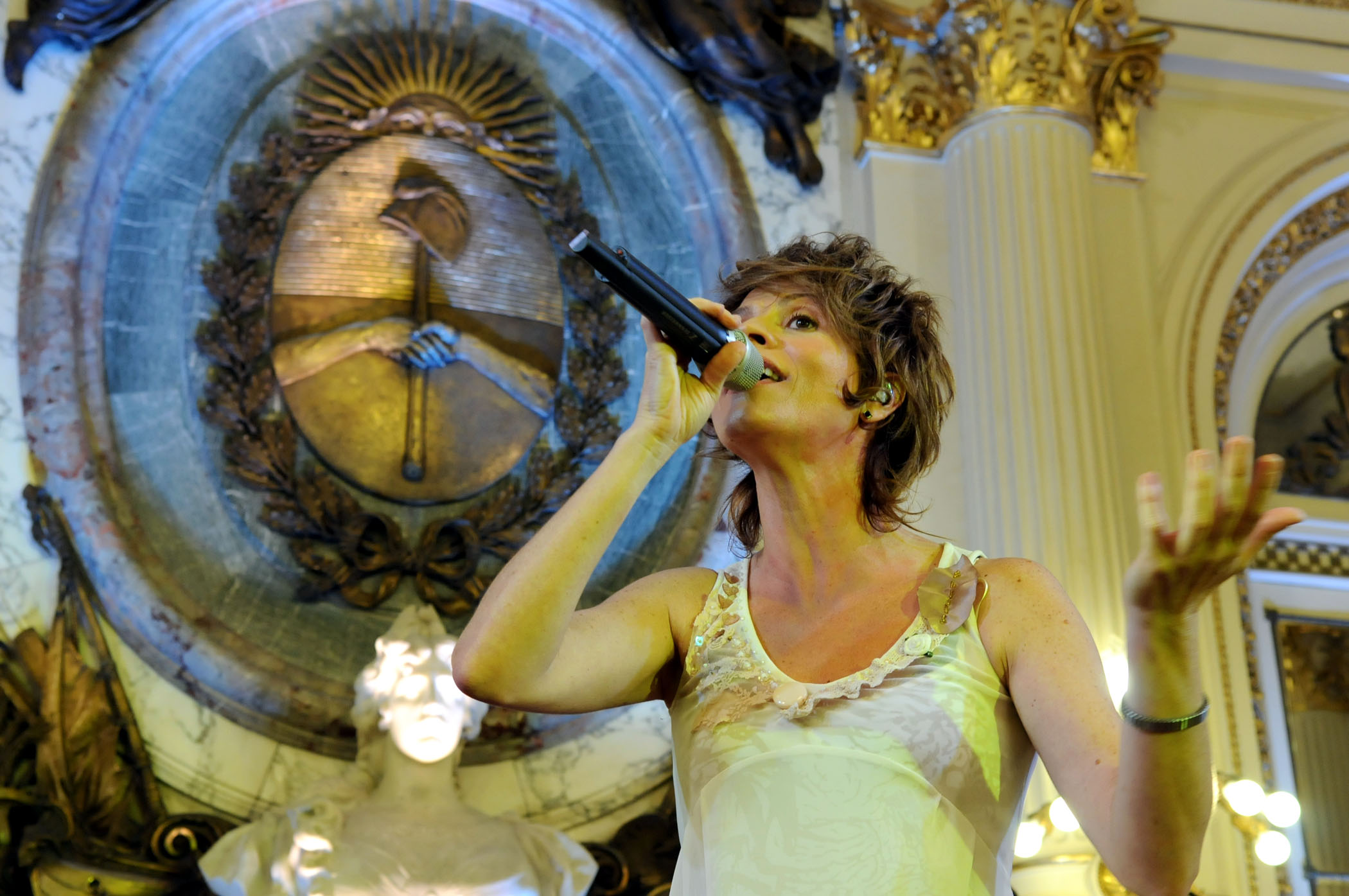

Background information
- Also known as: Marcela Morelo, La Morelo
- Born: Marcela Morello; 13 December 1969 (age 56); Lanús, Argentina
- Genres: pop, latin pop, folk
- Occupations: Singer, songwriter
- Instruments: Voice, guitar, charango
- Years active: 1997–present
- Label: Sony Music
- Website: marcelamorelo.com.ar

Marcela Morelo (born Marcela Morello on 13 December 1969) is an Argentine singer-songwriter. She has released eight critically acclaimed studio albums, which all earned either Gold or Platinum record. Morelo also won five Gardel Awards, the most prestigious musical award in Argentina.

== Life ==
Morelo has said that she began to study music at age 7 and learned how to sing and accompany herself on the guitar at age 9. Her grandfather played the bandoneon and performed in a tango orchestra. Before dedicating herself to music, Morelo worked as a sales clerk in a clothing store and a supermarket cashier.

In 2014, Morelo married her partner of 17 years, musician and producer Rodolfo Lugo. The couple later adopted three children.

== Career ==
In 1997, she released her debut album, Manantial, featuring a collection of songs she had written. Several singles released from the album, including "La fuerza del engaño" ("The Power of Deceit") and "Corazón salvaje" ("Wild Heart") were chart hits not only in Argentina but in Europe and Latin America. The album was awarded a Gold Record after three months, and it eventually sold enough copies to receive a Platinum Record.

Further releases by Morelo, including Eclipse, Tu boca (Your mouth), and Invisible, met with acclaim.

Morelo collaborated with Celia Cruz, Chichi Peralta, and Franco De Vita on a holiday-themed song, "Fuerte Navidad" ("Strong Christmas"). She recorded a duet with Miliki on his album "A mis niños de 30" ("To my children at 30"), entitled "Susanita" ("Susie", popular Spanish song for children). To aid in the fight against breast cancer, Morelo along with Rocío Dúrcal, Rosario, Ana Torroja and others recorded an album entitled Mujer (Woman).

In 2017, Morelo released a "best of" compilation, Los 20 de Morelo, which included a new song, "No voy a cambiarte", a duet with Mexican performer, Carlos Rivera.

In 2019, Morelo released the single "La salida", a duet with Spanish performer, Rozalén. To promote the single, Morelo and Rozalén performed the song at Buenos Aires' famed Teatro Colón.

== Awards ==
- Nominee, Premios Amigo 1998, "Best Female Artist—Latino," for Manantial
- Winner, Premios Gardel 1999, "Best New Artist" for Manantial
- Winner, Premios Gardel 1999, "Best Female Pop Artist Album" for Manantial
- Winner, Premios Gardel 2010, "Best Female Pop Artist"
- Winner, Premios Gardel 2013, "Best Female Pop Artist Album" for El club de los milagros
- Winner, Premios Gardel 2017, "Best Female Pop Artist Album" for Espinas y pétalos

== Discography ==
=== Albums ===
- Manantial (1997)
- Eclipse (1999)
- Tu boca (2001)
- Invisible (2003)
- Morelo 5 (2005)
- Morelo Vivo – Fuera Del Tiempo (2007)
- Otro Plan (2009)
- El club de los milagros (2012)
- Espinas y pétalos (2016)
- Los 20 de Morelo (2017)
- Tu mejor plan (2020)

=== Singles ===
- "La fuerza del engaño" (1997)
- "Corazón salvaje" (1997)
- "No me lastimes" (1997)
- "Esperar por ti" (1998)
- "Manantial" (1998)
- "Para toda la vida" (1999)
- "Tu boca" (2001)
- "Gotitas" (2001)
- "No voy a cambiarte" (featuring Carlos Rivera) (2017)
- "La salida" (duet with Rozalén) (2019)
- "Almas gemelas" (duet with Soledad) (2020)

== Filmography ==
- PH, podemos hablar (2021)
- Bailando 2021 (2021)
