= Rocío Marengo =

Argentine model, actress, singer, vedette, comedian and dancer

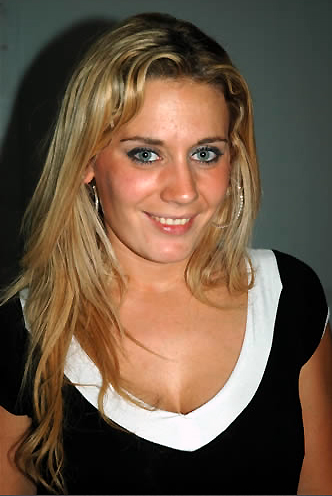
- Rocío Marengo in 2006.
- Born: Rocío Marengo Paganini; March 25, 1980 (age 46); Buenos Aires, Argentina
- Occupations: Model; actress; vedette; comedian; dancer
- Children: 1

Rocío Marengo (born March 25, 1980) is an Argentine model, singer, actress, vedette, comedian and dancer.

== Early life and career ==
Marengo early television experience includes co-hosting Mar de Fondo with Alejandro Fantino on TyC Sports.

She participated as a showgirl in Moria Casán journals, work that took her to Chile in 2004. Channel 13 in Chile offered her work as a model on the program Mucho Lucho. She left the show to get married and live in a hotel in Chile for a few months.

Marengo love life is frequently covered by the Argentine press and has contributed to her high profile. Reported relationships with TV host Alejandro "Marley" Wiebe and the son of Argentine star Graciela Alfano have been reported on, and she also made headlines with her alleged affair with football star Mauricio Pinilla. Other relationships have been regular press fodder in Argentina.

== Television and other appearances ==
In 2006, she participated in the reality TV show Expedition Robinson, the island VIP, which developed on a beach in the Dominican Republic, where she finished in fourth place. Later she participated in the program Locos por el baile.

In 2007, she appeared on season four of Bailando por un Sueño, a dance competition portion of the television program Showmatch, hosted by Marcelo Tinelli. She danced to "El Baile del Koala", in a routine that involved a woman breaking a man's pelvis, making moves on his waist, and mimicking sexual intercourse. Marengo was eliminated from the contest during the Rumba Flamenca and Quartet week.

In February 2008, she participated in the program with the satellite Viña festival, National Television of Chile. In August of that year she began the skating for A Dream and was the runner-up. She also participated in works of Gerardo Sofovich.

In 2009 she acted in a play in which her character quickly becomes a success. That same year she co-lead with Gerardo Sofovich Sunday night and was invited by the Chilean TV channel Chilevision on Wednesday 15 July the same year as the program Dance Fever as a replacement for Marlen Olivari.

In 2011, Marengo returned to Bailando por un Sueño (season eight), but was eliminated in the first week of competition.

In 2013, Rocio enters Mundos opuestos 2 replacing Claudia Schmidt. There Marengo took on a character in which she could be the bad or the good, and after eliminating Melina Figueroa she managed to reach the final but failed to beat Stephanie Cuevas, staying in second place.

Participation detail
Week	Team	Competence	Location	Removal advice	Status	Notes
1	Not in game					
2	Not in game					
3	Not in game					
4	Not in game					
5	Nirvana	Won	Paraíso	–	–	–
6	Nirvana	Lose	Infierno	0 votes	Safe	–
7	Nirvana	Won	Paraíso	–	–	–
8	Nirvana	Lose	Infierno	0 votes	Safe	–
9	Nirvana	Won	Paraíso	–	–	–
10	Nirvana	Lose	Infierno	0 votes	Safe	–
11	Gigantes	Lose	Infierno	–	Powerful	–
12	Gigantes	Won	Paraíso	–	–	–
13	Gigantes	Won	Paraíso	–	–	–
14	Gigantes	Lose	Infierno	–	Powerful	–
15	Gigantes	Lose	Infierno	0 votes	Safe	–
16	Individual	Won	Paraíso	–	Powerful	–
17	Individual	Won	Paraíso	–	Powerful	–
18	Individual	Won	Paraíso	–	Powerful	–
19	Individual	Won	Paraíso	–	Powerful	–
20/21	Individual	Won	Paraíso	–	Powerful	–
22/23	Individual	Won	Paraíso	–	Powerful	1st Semifinalists
Semifinals	Individual	Won			Duelist	Rocio eliminates Melina
Finals	Individual	Runner-up			Duelist	Stephanie beats Rocio

In 2017, she participated in the reality TV show "Doble Tentación" in Chile, where she finished being a semifinalist.

== Filmography ==
Reality shows
Year	Title	Place
2006	Expedición Robinson: La Isla Vip	4th place
2006–2007	Locos por el baile	3rd place
2007	Bailando por un Sueño 2007	8th place
2008	Patinando por un sueño 2008	Runner-up
2009	El Musical de tus Sueños	15th place
2009	Fiebre de Baile	6th place
2010	Bailando 2010	Replacing
2011	Bailando 2011	30th place
2013	Mundos opuestos 2	Runner-up girl
2017	Doble tentación: Un reality irresistible	4th place
2020	MasterChef Celebrity Chile	Runner-up
2020	MasterChef Celebrity Argentina	10th place
2021	La Academia	9th place
2022	El discípulo del chef 3	16th place
2022	El discípulo del chef: La gran batalla	15th place
2023	El Hotel De Los Famosos (season 2)	11th place
2023	Aquí se baila 3	22nd place

Others
Year	Title	Notes
2005	Te vi en Viña	Co-Host
2005	Quiero, sí tu quieres	She herself (cameo)
2006 - 2007	Vértigo	Assistant
2010	Un mundo perfecto	Cast
2011 - 2012	Coliseo Romano	Judge
2011 - 2012	Desayuno americano	Panelist
2014	La Noche C5N	Host
2016	Nessun dorma: nadie duerma	Panelist
2018	Flor de tarde	Replacement presenter
2019	Viva la pipol	Co-Host
2022	Minuto para ganar	Co-host
