= Legally Blonde (soundtrack) =

Legally Blonde: Original Motion Picture Soundtrack

Soundtrack album by various artists
- Released: July 10, 2001
- Recorded: 2001
- Length: 38:14
- Label: A&M
- Producer: Various: Will Adams; E. Dawk; Bill Deaton; Dino Esposito; Ron Fair; Max Hsu; Patrick Leonard; Lisa Loeb; Johnathan "Mook" Morant (also exec.); Giloh Morgan; Kevin Richardson (exec.); Rockwilder; Rob Schnapf; Jordan Schur (exec.); Roni Skies; Sol Survivor; Syn-G; Dweezil Zappa

Professional ratings
Review scores
Source	Rating
AllMusic	3/5 stars

Legally Blonde: Original Motion Picture Soundtrack is the soundtrack album to the 2001 film Legally Blonde, starring Reese Witherspoon, Selma Blair, Luke Wilson and Victor Garber. It was released on July 13, 2001, by A&M Records.

The album was nominated for the Satellite Award for Best Original Score.

== Track listing ==
No.	Title	Performer(s)	Length
1.	"Perfect Day"	Hoku	3:27
2.	"Love Is a Beautiful Thing" (remix)	Krystal Harris	3:19
3.	"We Could Still Belong Together"	Lisa Loeb	2:52
4.	"Don't Need You To (Tell Me I'm Pretty)"	Samantha Mumba	3:34
5.	"One Girl Revolution"	Superchick	2:56
6.	"A Thousand Miles (Interlude)"	Vanessa Carlton	3:57
7.	"Magic"	Black Eyed Peas featuring Terry Dexter	4:35
8.	"Watch Me Shine"	Joanna Pacitti	3:16
9.	"Ooh La La"	Valeria (Valeria Andrews)	3:48
10.	"Can't Get Me Down"	Lo-Ball	2:47
11.	"Sex Machine"	Mýa	3:43

== Charts ==
Chart (2001)	Peak position
US Billboard 200	171
US Soundtrack Albums (Billboard)	15
