= Gary H. Mason =

Music executive (born 1957)

Gary H. Mason (born June 21, 1957), also known as Big Daddy G., is a music producer, promoter and music video director.

Mason co-produced the Vina Del Mar Festival beginning in 1979 for 10 years. In 1989, he produced the hit song "El Meneaito", and directed the music video. It was released worldwide by BMG. Since then, he has produced and directed dozens of music videos, which have been seen by millions of people worldwide. His "Meneaito" video has currently been seen by over 50 million people on YouTube.

Some of the artists that Mason has toured, promoted and/or produced include Donna Summer, Ray Conniff, War, Peter Frampton, Jose Feliciano, Matt Monro, Shirley Bassey, Air Supply, Anita Ward, Sister Sledge, Jerry Lewis, Paul Michael Glaser, David Soul, Roberta Flack, Maurice Jarre, Krokus, Nazareth, Gaby, Jam & Suppose, Renato, Gloria Gaynor, Modern Talking, Los Diablos, Santana, Kathy, and Reggae Sam. Mason also produced a new version of "It's Tricky" featuring Rev. Run and Kathy Phillips.

Mason is currently CEO of SEI Corp. and established Fuerte Suerte Music (BMI), Big Daddy G. Music (ASCAP) and Ragga Force Music.

== Awards ==
Among his many awards, he is the recipient of both a Billboard Music Video Award nomination as Best Director and Best New Artist. He has been involved in productions that have garnered five Grammy Award nominations and one Grammy. The Grammy nominated productions include: Un Nuevo Comenzo – Los Diablos, Celebracion – Los Diablos, Escenas De Amor – Jose Feliciano, and Nuestro Tiempo – Los Diablos. The Grammy winning album was for Best Latin Pop Performance – Jose Feliciano – Me Enamore.
