= Munda peoples =

Ethno-linguistic groups of people found in South Asia

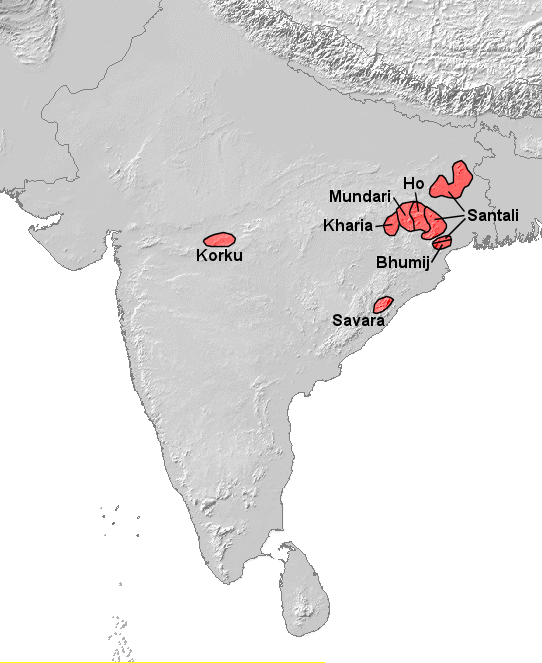
- Distribution of Munda language speakers in India

Regions with significant populations
- India, Bangladesh

Languages
- Munda languages

The Munda peoples, formerly also known as Kolarians, are a group of several ethnolinguistic groups native to the eastern and central parts of the Indian subcontinent. They speak languages from the Munda branch of the Austroasiatic language family. Collectively they number about 9 to 11 million people.

== History ==
According to linguist Paul Sidwell, pre-Munda languages arrived on the coast of Odisha from Southeast Asia about 4000–3500 years ago (c. 2000 – c. 1500 BCE), during the late Bronze Age, at the time of decline of the Indus Valley Civilization in Northwest India. The Munda people spread from Southeast Asia and mixed extensively with local Indian populations. Robert Parkin notes that the term "Munda" did not belong to the Austroasiatic lexis and is of Sanskrit origin. A popular pan-North Munda ethnonym is Kherwarian, derived from proto-Munda *kher ('bird'), which actually refers to the North Munda origin myth. According to Santal traditions, the first Santals were descended from a goose (kher), giving the identity 'Kherwal' as their alternative self-designation, but nowadays the term "Kherwarian" is used by scholars to designate the non-Korku North Munda languages which also include Santali. Another name referring to Munda peoples that has been known since ancient time is Savara but it was later used by different Indo-Aryan, Dravidian, and Juang groups in a wider area, henceforth led to confusion; the actual Savaras or the Sora are located further south of Orissa.

Archaeological evidence put forward by Kingwell-Banham et al. (2018) demonstrated that a Neolithic rice-millet culture arose in Odisha coast around 3,500 years ago, "strikingly similar to the linguistically reconstructed proto-Munda agriculture." (Sidwell & Rau, 2019:46) However, Kingwell-Banham et al. proposed that rice agriculturists of Odisha might have originated from the Eastern Gangetic Plain instead of from the sea. Excavations in Odisha coast by Sarma (2000) have identified ceramic forms common to Neolithic Southeast and South Asia, consisting of dull and slipped red ware, grey ware, and cord impressed ware. More important findings were uncovered in a major Neolithic-Chalcolithic site at Sankarjang (ca. second millennium BCE), located in the Brahmani river valley near Angul. They include lithophones which resemble the types of instruments found in Southern Vietnam, and was interpreted as "evidence for cultural contact between these two disparate parts of Asia in the prehistoric period" (Yule et al. 1990:584). More decisively, the human remains at Sankarjang burial site have also produced teeth "whose dental morphology suggests that these individuals had East or Southeast Asian ("mongoloid" [sic]) ancestry" (Yule et al. 1989:127–30). Gupta (2005:22) argued that the Neolithic-Chalcolithic situation found at Golabai, near the mouth of the Mahanadi, "hints at Southeast Asian landfall on the eastern Indian sea board in the 2nd–1st millennia BC" (cited in Sidwell & Rau, 2019:47). Pliny the Elder (c. 77 CE) and Claudius Ptolemy (c. 130 CE) respectively both mentioned the Suari and the Sabaræ living in the Orissa-Kalinga hilly coastal area, whom were construed as the same tribe by Gidugu Venkata Ramamurthy.

After dispersal from the Mahanadi River Delta, the Korku moved west 350 miles and established settlements in the Satpura hills while the Kherwarians settled in the Chota Nagpur plateau and Rajmahal hills and practiced a mix of shifting cultivation and rice farming. It appears that there were two Munda tribes, the Birhor and the Juang, had reverted back to forager lifestyles after moving to the eastern plateau, where "agriculture likely proved difficult" (Peterson 2021:10). Peterson (2021) suggests that Munda-speaking tribes were not restricted in the accretion hills, but also likely inhabited in the eastern parts of the Gangetic Plain, around densely populated regions of Uttar Pradesh and Bihar, where they later were absorbed into Indo-Aryan ethnic groups.

=== Migration into India ===
According to Chaubey et al., "Austro-Asiatic speakers in India today are derived from dispersal from Southeast Asia, followed by extensive sex-specific admixture with local Indian populations." According to Riccio et al., the Munda people are likely descended from Austroasiatic migrants from Southeast Asia.

According to Zhang et al., Austroasiatic migrations from Southeast Asia into India took place after the last Glacial maximum, circa 10,000 years ago. Arunkumar et al. suggest Austroasiatic migrations from Southeast Asia occurred into Northeast India 5.2 ± 0.6 kya and into East India 4.3 ± 0.2 kya.

Tätte et al. 2019 estimated that the Austroasiatic language speaking people admixed with Indian population about 2000-3800 year ago which may suggest arrival of south-east Asian genetic component in the area. Munda-speaking people have high amount of the Southeast Asian paternal lineage O1b1a1a (M95) (North Mundas having it at ~62% and South Mundas at ~73%), which is largely absent from other Indian groups. They found that the modern Munda-speaking people have about 29% East/Southeast Asian, 15.5% West Asian and 55.5% South Asian ancestry on average. The authors concluded that there was a mostly male-dominated migration into India from Southeast Asia. Modern people in Laos, Cambodia and Malaysia were found to represent the ancestral group, which migrated into India, and spread the Austroasiatic languages.

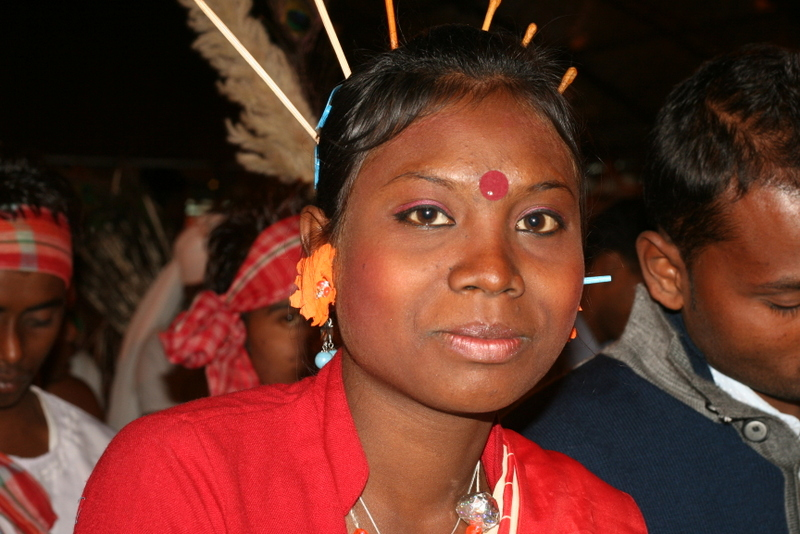
Munda woman

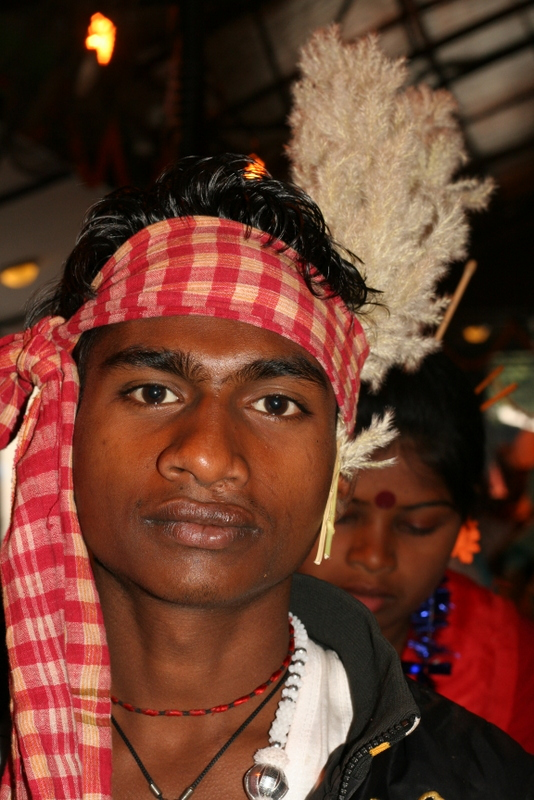
Munda man

== Culture ==
The Munda peoples traditionally follow and practice their own religions, which are forms of animism and shamanism. Many also follow Hinduism nowadays.

Due to efforts of Christian missionaries and a number of political factors, Christianity has established a stronghold among the Munda peoples during the last two centuries. The Norwegian Santal Mission began operating in Santal communities in 1867. Most Munda Christians today follow either Presbyterian, Baptist, Lutheran, some forms of Evangelical, and Catholic Churches.

== Ethnic groups ==
- Asur people
- Bhumij people
- Birhor people
- Bonda people
- Didayi (Dire, Gta') people
- Gadaba people (Only some Gadabas speak the Bonda-related Gutob language. Some others speak a Dravidian language.)
- Gorum (Parenga) people
- Ho people
- Juang people
- Kharia people
- Kodaku people
- Kora people
- Korku people
- Korwa people
- Lodha people
- Majhwar people
- Munda people
- Sabar people
- Santhal people
- Sora people
- Turi people

== Possible kins of the Munda peoples ==
Some ethnic groups do not natively speak any of the Munda languages, but genetic evidence suggest gene flow of some Munda genetic lineages.

- Khonds
- Gonds
- Baiga
- Nihali
- Saharia
- Members of ethnic Tharu people
