= Mangi Khurd =

- Village
- Mangi kh.
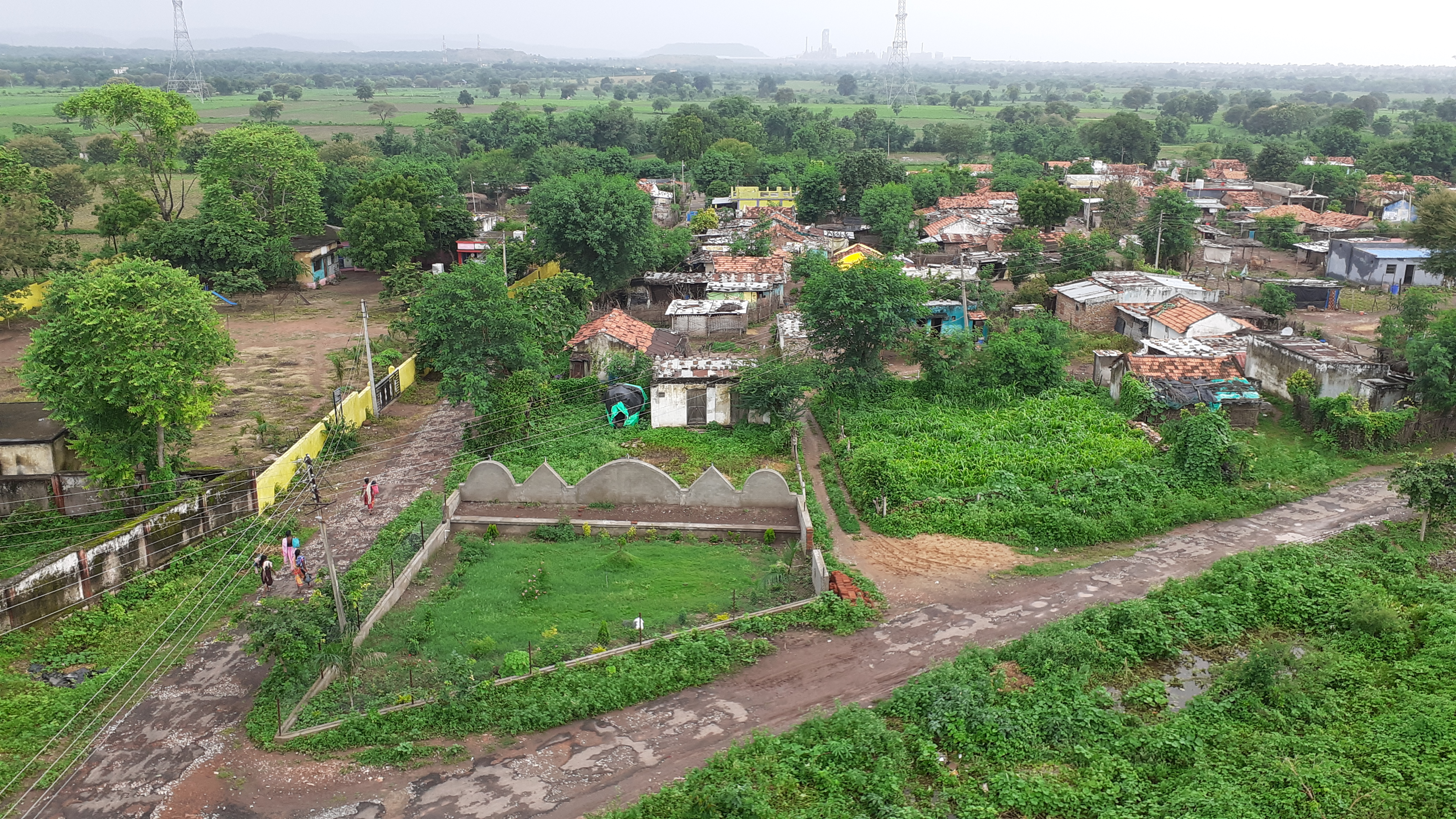
- Main Street Entrance

- Location in Maharashtra, India
- Country: India
- State: Maharashtra
- District: Chandrapur
- Taluka: Rajura
- Region: Vidarbha

Government
  - Type: Panchayati raj
  - Body: Gram panchayat

Population (2011)
  - Total: 848

Languages
  - Official: Marathi

Languages
  - Local: Gondi
- Time zone: UTC+5:30 (IST)
- Pin Code: 442908
- Telephone code: 07173
- Vehicle registration: MH 34

Mangi Khurd is a village of Rajura Taluka Chandrapur District Maharashtra and under Gram panchayat Mangi Bk in Chandrapur District Maharashtra, India

== Population ==
As of a 2011 Census, the village has 200 families and a population of 848. Of these, 437 are male while the females number 411. There are 63 children aged 0–6 years in this village. Of these, 30 are boys and 33 are girls.

== Development ==
Mangi Khurd is a smart village under Gram panchayat Mangi Bk. Received a prize of Rs 11 lakh as a smart village. Sant Gage Baba cleanliness award received a prize of Rs. 8 lakh.

== Awards ==
- Smart Village Award
- Sant Gage Baba Cleanliness Award
- R.R Patil Smart Gram Village Award

== Transport ==
=== Road ===
Gadchandur town is well connected to nearby villages by village roads.

=== Rail ===
Ballarpur is nearest railway station to village.

=== Air ===
Nagpur Airport is the nearest airport to village.

== Schools ==
- Z.P Primary High School Mangi Kh
- Government Post Bacis Ashram School Mangi Kh
- Trible Ashram Government Industrial Training Institute (ITI), Mangi Khurd

== See also ==
- List of village in Rajura taluka
- Rajura taluka
- Chandrapur district
