= Gadaba language =

Gadaba language refers to a language of the Gadaba people. This may be:

- Gutob language (Bodo or Boi Gadaba), an Austro-Asiatic language
- Ollari language (Ollar or Pottangi Gadaba), a Dravidian language
- Kondekor language (Mudhili or Gol Gadaba), closely related to Ollari
