= Gadaba =

Gadaba may be:

- Gadaba people
- Gutob language, a Munda language spoken in the state of Odisha and Andhra Pradesh, India
- Ollari Gadaba language, a Dravidian language of Odisha and Andhra Pradesh
- Kondekor Gadaba language, a Dravidian language of Odisha and Andhra Pradesh
