= Korku language =

Munda language spoken in Central India

Korku
- कोरकू
- Region: Central India (Madhya Pradesh, Maharashtra)
- Ethnicity: Korku
- Native speakers: 730,000 (2011 census)
- Language family: Austroasiatic: Munda; North; Korku
- Dialects: Melghat; Lahi; Muwasi
- Writing system: Devanagari script (Balbodh style)

Language codes
- ISO 639-3: kfq
- Glottolog: kork1243
- ELP: Korku
- Korku is classified as Vulnerable by the UNESCO Atlas of the World's Languages in Danger.

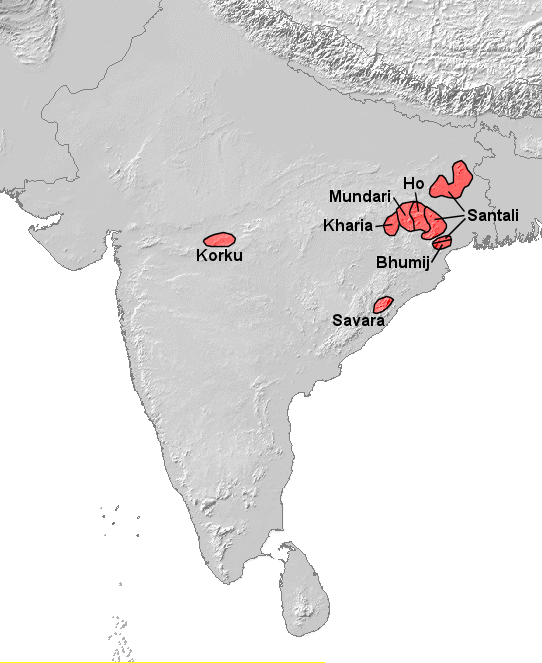
Distribution of the Munda languages in India, with Korku the leftmost in central India

Korku (also known as Kurku) is a Munda language spoken by the Korku people of central India, in the states of Madhya Pradesh and Maharashtra. It is isolated in the midst of the Gondi people, who are Dravidian, while its closest relatives are in eastern India. It is the westernmost Austroasiatic language.

Korkus are also closely associated with the Nihali people, many of whom have traditionally lived in special quarters of Korku villages. Korku is spoken by around 700,000 people, mainly in four districts of southern Madhya Pradesh (Khandwa, Harda, Betul, Narmadapuram) and three districts of northern Maharashtra (Rajura and Korpana tahsils of Chandrapur district, Manikgarh pahad area near Gadchandur in Chandrapur district) (Amravati, Buldhana, Akola).

The name Korku comes from Koro-ku (-ku is the animate plural), Koro 'person, member of the Korku community' (Zide 2008).

== Sociolinguistics ==
The Indian national census of 2011 reported 727,133 people claiming to speak Korku, which contributes to Korku being an unscheduled language according to the Indian system. However, Korku is classified as "vulnerable" by UNESCO, the least concerning of the levels of language endangerment nonetheless. Most adult men are bilingual in Hindi, or multilingual in Hindi and the local Dravidian languages (Zide 2008: 156). Literacy in the language is low.

Throughout recent history, the use of the Korku language has been heavily influenced by larger hegemonic languages, especially Hindi. A few Korku-speaking groups have had relative success in increasing the viability of their dialect, specifically the Potharia Korku from the Vindhya Mountains.

=== Dialects ===
Zide (2008:256) lists two dialects for Korku, a Western and an Eastern one. The Western Dialect, which has a handful of subdialects is also called Korku. Among the Western varieties, the one spoken in Lahi is notable for its loss of the dual number.

- Western (aka Korku) dialect: spoken in the districts of Melghat, Betul-Narmadapuram, and Narmadapuram.
- Eastern (aka Muwasi/Mowasi/Mawasi, or Kurku): spoken in the Chhindwara district of southeastern Madhya Pradesh.

Glottolog lists four dialects for Korku:

- Ruma (Korku)
- Bondoy
- Bouriya
- Mawasi (or Muwasi)

=== Geographical Distribution ===
Korku is spoken in the following regions (Zide 2008:256):

- South-central Madhya Pradesh
  - Khandwa district
  - Betul district
  - Narmadapuram district
  - Chhindwara district (Mawasi speakers)
- Northeastern Maharashtra
  - Amravati district (majority of speakers in Maharashtra)
  - Buldhana district
  - Akola district

== Phonology ==
=== Vowels ===
Korku has 10 phonemic vowels, which can occur short or long (e.g. /aː/), plus one mid vowel that only occurs as a short segment /ə/.

	Front	Central	Back
Close	i iː		u uː
Mid	e eː	ə	o oː
Open		a aː	

=== Consonants ===
Korku has a large consonant phoneme inventory, in which stops occur in several places of articulation. Like many languages of India, Korku stops distinguish between voiced, plain voiceless, and voiceless aspirated consonants.

		Bilabial	Alveolar	Retroflex	Palatal	Velar	Glottal
Stop	voiceless	p	t	ʈ	c	k	ʔ
Stop	aspirated	pʰ	tʰ	ʈʰ	cʰ	kʰ	
Stop	voiced	b	d	ɖ	ɟ	ɡ	
Stop	breathy	bʱ	dʱ	ɖʱ	ɟʱ	ɡʱ	
Fricative			s				h
Nasal		m	n		ɲ		
Approximant			l	ɭ	j		
Flap			ɾ	ɽ			

Word-finally, all stops are unreleased.

=== Tone ===
Korku has two contrastive level tones: low and high. The high tone is unmarked. In many reduplicated verbs, the prefixed element takes the low tone. Only non-initial syllables exhibit tone distinction. In allegro speech, low tone can inject the whole noun phrase, as if there is a low tone in the phrase, every syllable after it will express with low tones. Example iɲ-àʔ sanì kẽᶑe siɽi "my black small goat" → iɲàʔ sànì kẽᶑè sìɽì.

=== Vowel harmony ===
Verb suffixes and demonstrative derivatives, particularly stems with a final vowel will trigger vowel harmony in morphology: in-èn > enèn ('here'). Initial vowel is harmonised to match with the stressed final syllable. Verb suffixes with -CV structure contract with and are reduced when preceding suffixes with initial vowels. E.g. kul-ki-èʔ-(n)ej (send-INTNS/TLOC-PST.TR-3.OBJ, 'sent him') becomes kulkhèʔnèj when is spelled.

== Morphosyntax ==
Korku is a highly agglutinating, suffixing language. It has postpositions, a case system, a two-gender system, and three numbers. The verb phrase can be complex in Korku; functions that in English and other languages may be encoded in by the use of auxiliary verbs and of prepositions may be expressed in Korku through suffixation.

=== Word order ===
Korku, as all Munda languages, shows a strict Subject–Object–Verb (SOV) word order.

Subject	Object		Verb
iɲɟ	dukanaʈen	saːkaɾ	sasaːba
I	store-from	sugar	bring.will
"I will bring sugar from the store"

Adjectives are expressed verbally - as intransitive verbs - with the exception of a few cases in which a separate word occurs before the noun they are modifying.

	Numeral	Adjective	Noun
ɖiɟaʔ	apʰai	kenɖe	simku
her/his	three	black	chickens
"Her/His three black chickens"

=== Morphology ===
Nouns in Korku are assigned one of two grammatical genders: animate, and inanimate, and inflect for several different grammatical cases.

==== Grammatical number ====
Korku distinguishes three grammatical numbers: singular, dual (two of X), and plural (three or more of X) for nouns in the animate class. Nouns in the inanimate class are rarely marked for number. Final vowels are sometimes deleted before dual or plural endings (see the example at koɾo).

Singular	Dual	Plural
konɟe-Ø ‘daughter’	konɟe-kiɲ ‘two daughters’	konɟe-ku ‘daughters’
koɾo ‘man’	koɾkiɲ ‘two men’	koɾku ‘men’
siʈa ‘dog’	siʈakiɲ ‘two dogs’	siʈaku ‘dogs’

==== Case system ====
In Korku, the function of participants in a sentence (e.g. agent, patient, etc.) is expressed through grammatical case markings on nouns. Additionally, ideas that are expressed via prepositions in English (e.g. towards, from, with, etc.) are also expressed via case markings in Korku. The table below illustrates the different cases and the suffixes used to express them.

Case	Marker	Example	Function
Nominative	-Ø	ɖiɟ ‘s/he’ siʈa ‘the dog’ (subj.)	Subject
Accusative-Dative	-kʰe(ʔ)/	ɖiɟkʰeʔ ‘her/him’ siʈakʰeʔ ‘the dog’ (obj.)	(In)Direct object
Genitive	-à(ʔ)	ɖiɟàʔ ‘her/his' ɟikɽaàʔ ‘of a porcupine’	Possession
Locative	-èn	uɾagèn ‘in the house’ Nagpuɾèn ‘in Nagpur’	Spatio-temporal location
Comitative	-gon/-gella	konɟegon ‘with a daughter’	Company, togetherness
Instrumental	-ten	kolomten ‘by/in pen’	Means
Allative	-ʈae	Acalpurʈae ‘towards Achalpur'	Direction at/towards
Ablative	-(à)ten	uɾagàten ‘from the house’	Source, spatial origin

Other directional and time markers include:

- Adessive -àʔmera-èn
- Superessive -àliɲ-èn
- Postessive -àʔtau-èn
- Subessive -àʔita-èn
- Temporal (before) -à-sutuʔ
- Temporal (after) -à-baadòn

==== Argument marking ====
Additionally, Korku regularly marks direct object on the verb, as in other Munda languages. In the sentence below, the suffix /eɟ/ on the verb compound /senɖawkʰen/ indicates that it was someone else who was given permission to go.

Subject	Object	Verb
iɲɟ	ɖikʰeʔ	senɖawkʰen-eɟ
I	her/him	allowed.to.go-obj
"I allowed her/him to go"

Another example,

ᶑij dadù-ten sita-khèʔ tol-kh-èn-ej
She Dadu-ABL dog-ACC tie-INT-PST.TR-3SG.OBJ.ANIM
'She had Dadu tie the dog'

Korku has evidence of subject marking in the past, but in modern-day subject indexation has been fossilized and restricted to third persons of locative copulas and nominal predicates in the locative case.

di-kiñ Sikag-òn-kiñ
3DU Chicago-LOC-3DU.SUBJ
'They two are in Chicago'

Table below lists pronominal markers in Korku that encode person/number for the object arguments.

		Singular	Dual	Plural
1st person	Inclusive	-iɲ	-laɲ/-lom	-buɲ
1st person	Exclusive	-iɲ	-liɲ	-le
2nd person		-mi	-piɲ	-pe
3rd person	Animate	-èj	-kiɲ	-ku
3rd person	Inanimate	-e		

==== Tenses/Moods/Aspects/Directionality ====
Given that the general trend in Munda languages is the fusion of tenses with voices, Korku stems are subjected to complex stem alternations in tense/aspect marking in regards to transitivity, animacy, and augmentation. There are two tenses in Korku: Future/Present and Past. Depending on whether the verb is in active or middle voice, its structures may vary. In Future/Present forms, intransitive stems take intransitive marker -ùʔ except some few verbs such as sen ('go'), hej ('come'), and niɽ ('run, go away').

	Intransitive	Transitive
Future/Present	Σ-bà; Σ-e-bà; Σ-Mode-ùʔ-bà	Reduplicated-Σ-bà; Σ-Mode-Object-bà
Past	Σ-Mode-en	Σ-Mode-Object-èʔ

Korku utilizes partial reduplications of certain monosyllabic stems to create imperfective, habitual, and infinitive forms. In some instances, the reduplicated variant can convey effects and anticipations of an immediate about-to-happen action.

Verb stems can take other markers to express modality/mood/aspects/orientations. Note that many of those suffixes have overlapping functions/fused with other TAM/person categories or assimilated/harmonized with final stressed suffixes. For example, the continuous progressive -lakken that often occurs with reduplicated allomorph to describe unfolding actions contains two elements, the auxiliary -lab and the perfective/unaccomplishment -ken, itself a contracted form of translocative, intensive mode, recent past -ki and intransitive past -en, but are functionally different.

ku-kul-lab-ki-en
RDPL~send-AUX:PROG-INT-INTR
'is sending'

TAM/Orientation in Korku (Zide 2008)
Affixes	Function
-ki	Intensive Mode, Translocative, Recent Past, Probabilitative
-lì	Cislocative
-ya	Translocative, Remote past
-ʈʰà	Attemptive, Tentative Mode
-jom	Delayed action
-wa	Benefactive
-ɲ	Past transitive
-ùʔ	Passive-potential
-kʰùʔ	Durative mood
-yùʔ < -ya-ùʔ	Potential, ability
-lab	Continuous aspect
-ken	Prefective, Unaccomplishness
-daːn	Past Habitual
-da	Unaccomplishness
-ka	Continuative aspect
-ye	Capabilitive mood
wa-	Permissive mood

==== Pronouns ====
===== Personal pronouns =====
Personal pronouns in Korku show different number and gender patterns depending on the person. The first person ("I, we") distinguishes not only the three numbers but also whether the hearer is included ("all of us") or excluded ("us, but not you") in the communicative context. The second person ("you, you all") only encodes number, whereas the third person ("s/he, they") distinguishes gender, and number for animate nouns.

		Singular	Dual	Plural
1st person	Inclusive	iɲɟ	alaŋɟ	abuɲ
1st person	Exclusive	iɲɟ	aliɲɟ	ale
2nd person		aːm	apinɟ	ape
3rd person	Animate	ɖic ~ in	ɖikinɟ	ɖiku
3rd person	Inanimate	ɖiː		

==== Demonstratives ====
In Korku, demonstratives (e.g. "this, that, those") encode not only distance (e.g. "here and there") but also gender and number. Unlike English, which only distinguishes between a single proximal (this) and distal (that) spatial references, Korku demonstratives encode four levels of proximity to the speaker (i.e. ‘very close’ vs. ‘close’ vs. ‘far’ vs. ‘very far’), plus a fifth distinction, when one is pinpointing. The table below illustrates the forms used in Korku.

Gender	Number	Distance				
Gender	Number	Proximal		Distal		
Gender	Number	Very close	Close	Far	Very far	Pinpointing
Inanimate	Singular	ni	ini / noːɟe	ɖi	ha / hu / ho	huɟɟe
Animate	Singular	nic	inic	ɖic	huc / huɟ / huɟe	hoːɟe
Animate	Dual	niɲɟ	inkiɲɟ / noːkiɲɟ	ɖikiɲɟ	huɟkiɲɟ	hoːkiɲɟ
Animate	Plural	niku	inku / noːku	ɖiku	huɟku	hoːku

==== Derivation ====
In Korku, the infix -nV- is sometimes injected into verbs to derive nouns. This method is no longer productive as compared to the Kherwarian languages and other Munda lects.

kaɽub ('to cover') → kanuɽub ('lid, cover')

jukh(V)rij ('to sweep') → junuʔ ('broom')

== Lexicon ==
=== Numerals ===
The basic cardinal numbers from 1 to 10 (transcribed in IPA) are:

1	miɲaʔ
2	bari
3	apʰai
4	apʰun
5	monoe
6	tuɾui
7	ei
8	ilaɾ
9	aɾei
10	gel

Numbers after 11 are mainly of Indo-Aryan origin.

=== Kinship terms ===
As with many Austroasiatic languages, Korku has several words to refer to members of one's family, including the extended family and in-laws. There are often separate terms for people depending on their gender and seniority, for instance /bawan/ "wife's older brother" and /kosɾeʈ/ "elder brother's son". In the tables below, words that include the suffix -/ʈe/ refer to someone else's family member, so that /kon/ means "my son", whereas /konʈe/ is used when talking about someone else's son, for instance /ɖukriaʔ konʈe/ "the old woman's son".

Immediate family
mother	anʈe / maːj
father	baːʈe / aba
daughter	konɟaj / konɟeʈe
son	kon / konʈe
younger sister	bokoɟe / bokoɟeʈe
older brother	ɖaj / ɖajʈe
younger brother	boko

Korku has words to refer to pairs or groups of people in the family.

Pairs or groups of family members
parents	anʈebaːʈe
children	baːlbacca
children and wife	konkuɟapaj
mother and son	ajomkokoɲa
father and son	baːkokoɲa
siblings	bombuku

In-laws (Wife's side)
wife	ɟapaj
wife's elder sister	ɟiɟikaɲkaɾ(ʈe)
wife's younger sister	bewanɟe(ʈe)
wife's sister's husband	saɽgi(ʈe)
wife's elder brother	baːw(ʈe)
wife's younger brother	bawan(ʈe)

== Writing system ==
The Korku language uses the Balbodh style of the Devanagari script, which is also used to write the Marathi language.

== Sample text ==
Korku folklore: Kolia - The Story of a Jackal

miãʔ kolia ɖa-en
One Jackal be-PST.INTR
'There was a Jackal.'

ɖi-ej ij-e ij-e gaɖa paɽi-ki-èʔ
DEM-3SG.ANIM shit-INAN ~RDPL river block.up-INT-PST.TR
'He, defecating (continually, repeatedly), blocked up the river.'

ɖi-ga-atèn bãɖa aɖi hej-ya-en
that-direction-ABL flood current come-TLOC-PST.TR
'A big flood came there.'

Aɖi ɖij-àʔ ij-ʈeʔ par ʈu-ya-èʔ
current he-GEN shit-3 completely carry.away-TLOC-PST.TR
'The current/flood washed away all his shit.'

dusra din kolia gaɖa ɖo-ɖòʔ ol-en
next day jackal river RDPL-see go-PST.INTR
'The next day the jackal went to see the river.'

ɖi-ej gaɖa-kʰèʔ mhen-an gaɖa gaɖa, iñ-aʔ ij ʈon-ga-èn-eʔ
that-3SG.ANIM river-ACC say-PST.INTR river river me-GEN shit which-direction-LOC-VBLZR
'He (the jackal) said to the river: where is my shit?'
