= Uday Raj Aaley =

Nepali language researcher, writer and activist

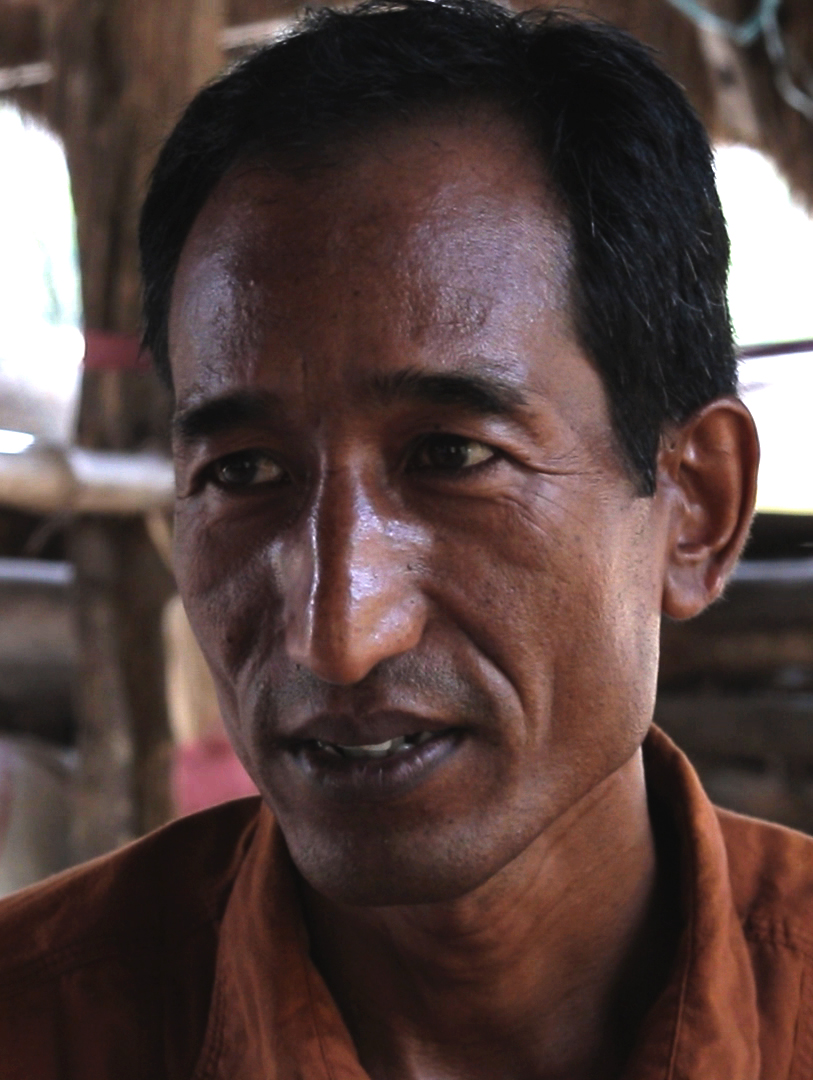
- Uday Raj Aaley in 2018
- Occupations: Language researcher, lexicographer, writer and activist
- Notable work: Kusunda Jatira Shabdakosh (2017); Gemyehak: King of the Forest (2023); Kusunda Gipan; Tharu Brihat Shabd Kosh

Uday Raj Aaley is a language researcher, lexicographer, writer and activist from Nepal. He is known for documenting and revitalising the moribund Kusunda language and teaching it to young children along with Kusunda elders Gyani Maiya Sen-Kusunda and Kamala Sen-Khatri. In 2019, he and Timotheus Adrianus Bodt raised funds to document audio and video materials in Kusunda and create a list of 250 concepts in Kusunda. Aaley has indicated the lack of prescriptive grammar in Kusunda to generalise and formalise Kusunda in his research findings.

== Early life ==
Uday Raj Aaley was born in western Nepal and is a native Magar language speaker.

== Career ==
Aaley interviewing the late Gyani Maiya Sen-Kusunda about her community's former nomadic life in 2019 documentary Gyani Maiya

Aaley began documenting the Kusunda language in 2010s and published the trilingual (English-Nepali-Kusunda) dictionary Kusunda Jatira Shabdakosh in 2017. He began an education programme together with Gyani Maiya Sen-Kusunda and Kamala Sen-Khatri in January 2019 for teaching 20 children Kusunda with support from Nepal's Language Commission. The bilingual (Nepali-Kusunda) education resources created in this programme were the first materials in Kusunda. In 2019, he and Timotheus Adrianus Bodt raised US$5,000 from a grant from Endangered Language Fund and a crowd-funding campaign on GoFundMe to document audio and video materials in Kusunda and create a list of 250 concepts in Kusunda. He collaborated with Nepalese-American not-for-profit Archive Nepal and received a grant from the British Council in 2023 to develop courses to teach Kusunda online and to higher secondary students through bilingual Nepali-Kusunda books.

== Bibliography ==
- Kusunda Jatira Shabdakosh (2017)
- Gemyehak: King of the Forest (2023)
- Kusunda Gipan
- Tharu Brihat Shabd Kosh
