= Taudhakpur =

Taudhakpur तौधकपुर Mirzapur urf Taudhakpur
- Village
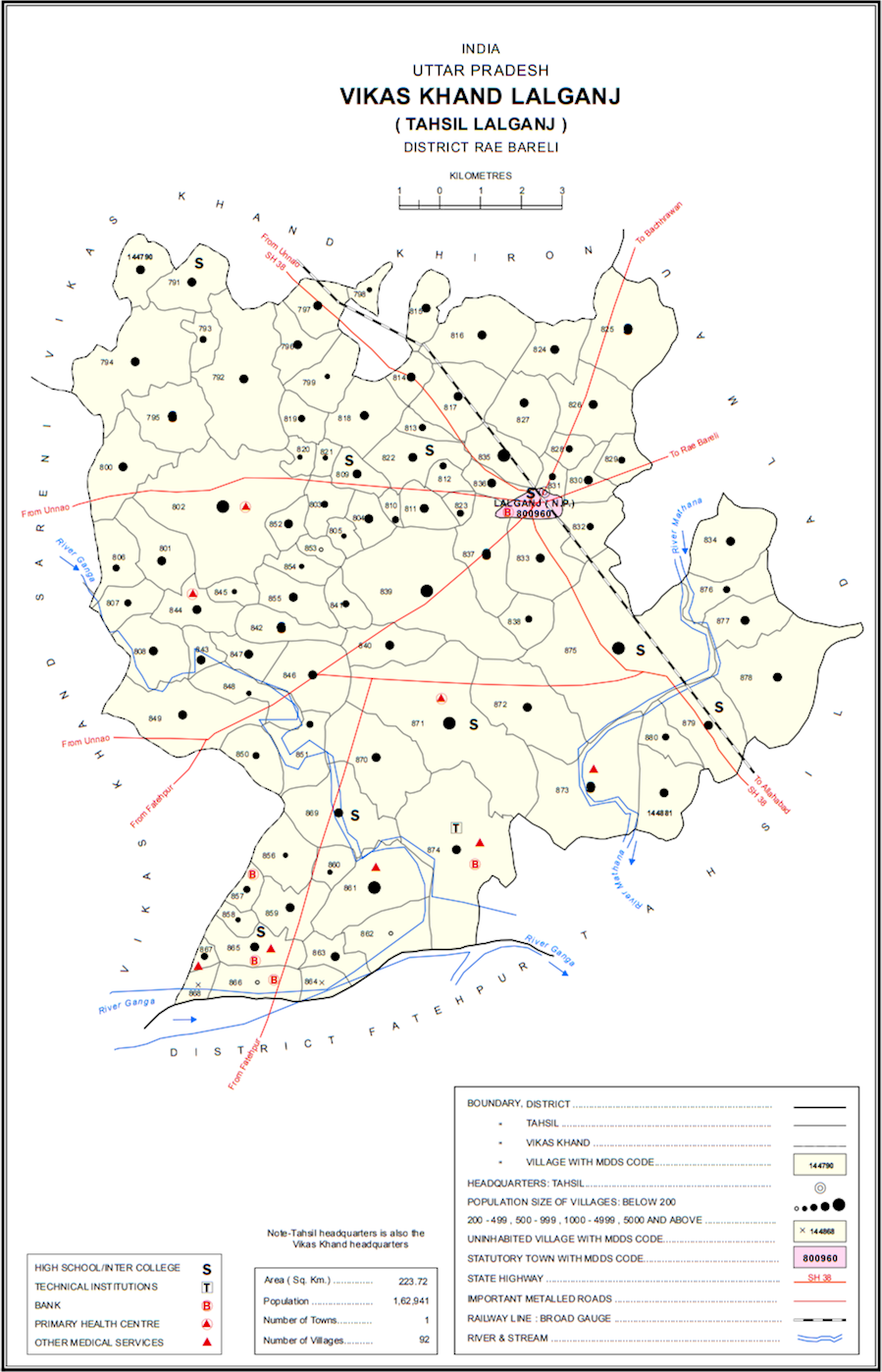
- Map showing Taudhakpur (#828) in Lalganj CD block

- Location in Uttar Pradesh, India
- Coordinates: 26.13°N 80.79°E
- Country: India
- State: Uttar Pradesh
- District: Raebareli

Area
  - Total: 0.632 km^{2} (0.244 sq mi)
- Elevation: 118 m (387 ft)

Population (2011)
  - Total: 833
  - Density: 1,320/km^{2} (3,410/sq mi)

Languages
  - Official: Hindi
- Time zone: UTC+5:30 (IST)
- PIN: 229206
- Sex ratio: 983 ♂/1000 ♀
- Gram Pradhan: Manoj Kumar
- Website: up.gov.in

Taudhakpur, also known as Mirzapur Urf Taudhakpur, is a village located in Raebareli district, in the state of Uttar Pradesh, India. The village is 31 km from Raebareli and 87 km from Lucknow. As of 2011, the village had a population of 833 with a 70.43% literacy rate. With the introduction of a digitized information center and modern-age communication facilities in 2018, Taudhakpur became the first smart village of India.

== Demographics ==
As per the 2011 census, Taudhakpur has a population of 833, in 163 households. Males constitute 50.4% of the population whereas females 50.6%. The village has an average literacy rate of 70.43% which is higher than the average literacy rate of Uttar Pradesh which is 67.68%. 80% of male population are literate whereas the literacy rate of females are 60.78%. Child sex ratio of Taudhakpur is 1189 which is comparatively higher than the state as well as the national average. Hindi is majority spoken language of the village and agriculture is the main source of income.

== Geography ==
Taudhakpur is a mid-size village located in Lalganj tehsil (sub-district) of Raebareli district in Uttar Pradesh. The village falls under Sareni, a constituency of the Uttar Pradesh Legislative Assembly. The total area of Taudhakpur is around 63 hectares with average elevation 118m (387 ft).

== Smart village ==
In July 2018, Taudhakpur was declared India's first smart village. SmartGaon Development Foundation, led by Rajnish Bajpai and Yogesh Sahu, and with the initiative from village pradhan Kartikay Shankar Bajpai, deployed their first project to completely digitize the infrastructure of Taudhakpur. After the completion of the project by SmartGaon, Taudhakpur village built 242 toilets in 2 days, which was a record in Uttar Pradesh. Apart from many essential technological equipment, close circuit cameras, public address systems, street lights, regular health check-up events, continuous power supply and WiFi zone was installed. With help of SmartGaon App, smart farming practice was introduced to the population of Taudhakpur. The development of the village was also acknowledged by the Prime Minister of India, Narendra Modi.
