= Mahapadma =

Mahāpadma may refer to

- a legendary treasure in Hindu mythology
  - one of the nine treasures of Kubera
  - a particular treasure inhabited by a Nāga, and a name of that Naga
  - one of the eight treasures connected with Padmini magic
- one of the eight cold hells in Hindu cosmology
- the southernmost of the world-elephants supporting the earth in the Sanskrit epics
- Mahapadma Nanda, a historical Magadha king

== See also ==
- Padma (disambiguation)
- Mahananda (disambiguation)
