= Balbodh =

Style of Devanagari used for writing the Marathi language

Bāḷabōdha बाळबोध
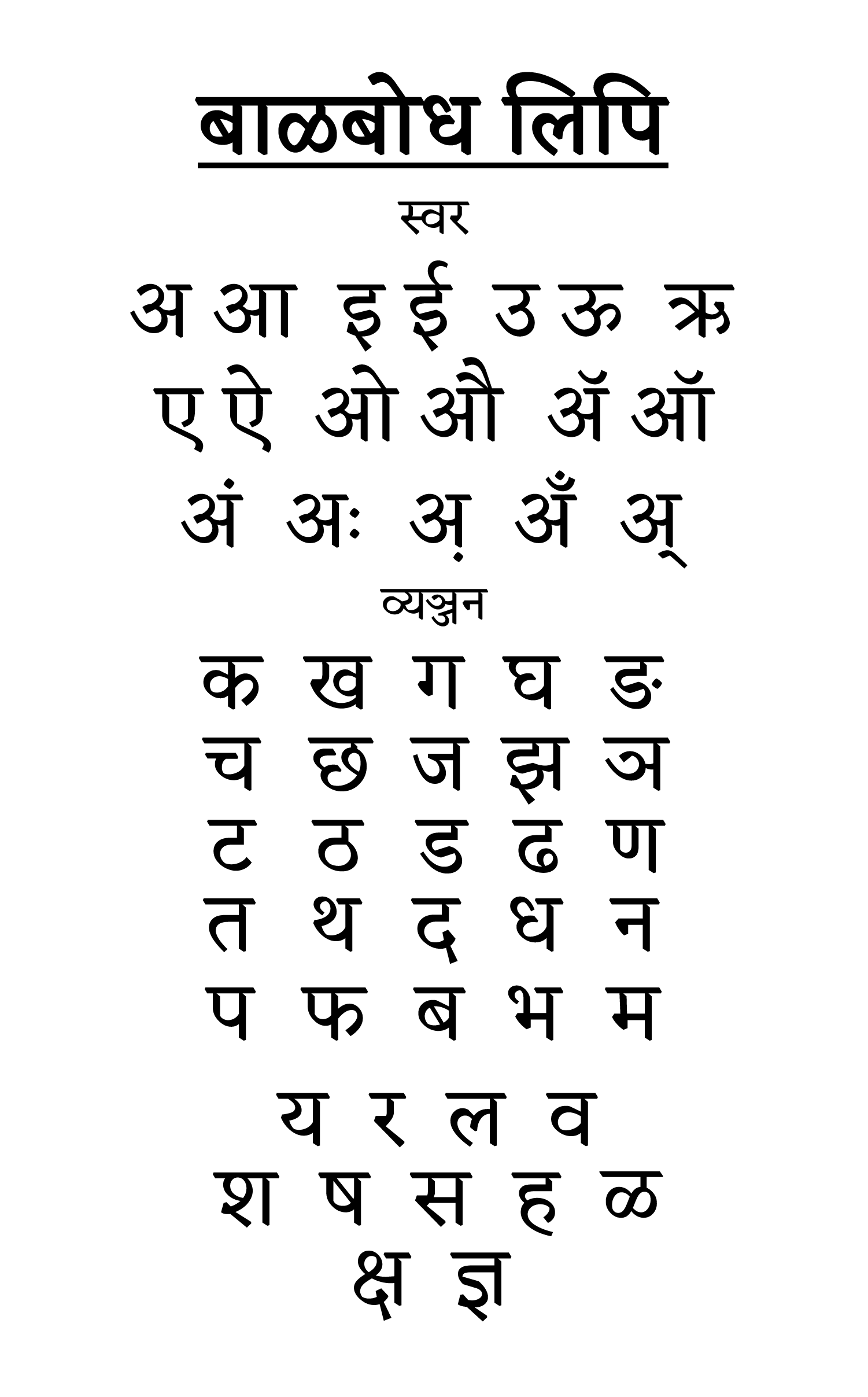
- Balbodh variant of the Devanagari script (vowels top three rows, consonants below)
- Script type: Abugida
- Period: 11th century to present
- Direction: Left-to-right
- Official script: India: Maharashtra
- Languages: Marathi, Korku

Related scripts
- Parent systems: Egyptian hieroglyphs: Proto-Sinaitic (Note: A Semitic origin for the Brāhmī script is not universally accepted.); Phoenician; Aramaic; Brāhmī; Gupta; Siddhaṃ; Nāgarī; Devanāgarī; Bāḷabōdha
- Sister systems: Moḍī

ISO 15924
- ISO 15924: Deva (315), Devanagari (Nagari)

Unicode
- Unicode alias: Devanagari
- Unicode range: U+0900–U+097F Devanagari, U+A8E0–U+A8FF Devanagari Extended, U+11B00–11B5F Devanagari Extended-A, U+1CD0–U+1CFF Vedic Extensions

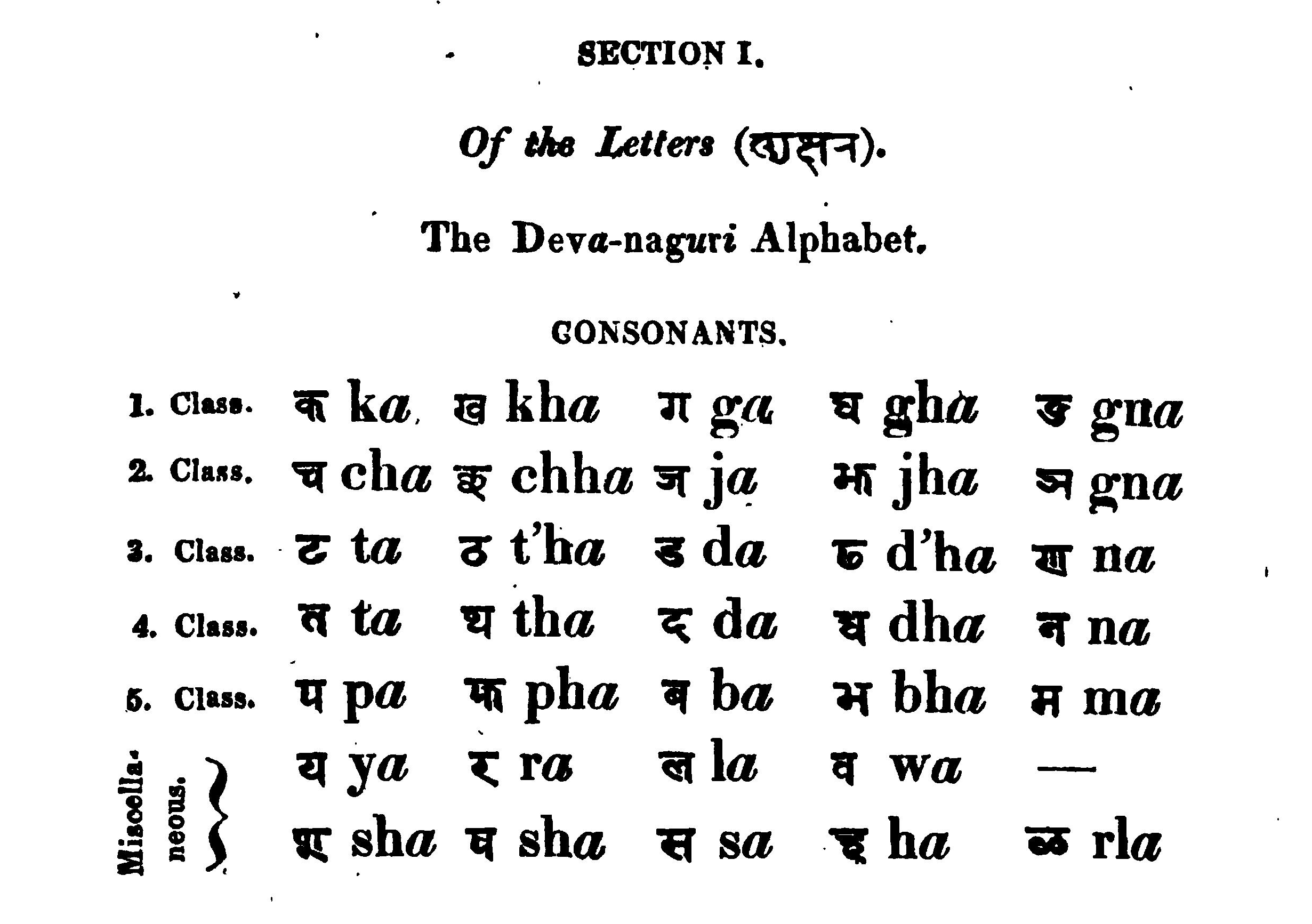
Balbodh consonants in the book A grammar of the Mahratta language (1805).

Balabodh (Marathi: बाळबोध, bāḷabōdha, Marathi pronunciation: [baːɭboːd̪ʱ], translation: understood by children) is a slightly modified style of the Devanagari script used to write the Marathi language and the Korku language. What sets balabodha apart from the Devanagari script used for other languages is the more frequent and regular use of both ळ /ɭ/ (retroflex lateral flap) and र्‍ (called the eyelash reph / raphar). Additionally, Balbodh style has ऍ/ॲ and ऑ as adaptations to pronounce [æ] and [ɒ] in English-based words. Another distinctive feature is the use of Anusvara over trailing अ, denoting lengthening of the trailing vowel.

== Etymology ==
The word balabodha is a combination of the words ‘बाळ’ /baːɭ/ and ‘बोध’ /boːd̪ʱ/. ‘बाळ’ is a neuter noun derived from the Sanskrit word bāla "child". ‘बोध’ is a male noun and a tatsama meaning "perception".

As far as the Marathi literature is concerned, Bāḷabōdha can be assumed to be composed of "bāḷa" meaning primary and "bōdha" meaning knowledge. So Marathi bāḷabōdha may be understood as the primary knowledge of Marathi language. In primary knowledge, Muḷākshare (Basic Letters), consisting of 12 vowels अ आ इ ई उ ऊ ए ऐ ओ औ अं अः (like A, E, I, O, and U in English) and 36 consonants in five groups (क वर्ग, च वर्ग, ट वर्ग, त वर्ग and प वर्ग) and 11 individual consonants, are taught to children and illiterate persons through recitation and writing on slates.

== Features ==
=== Retroflex lateral flap ===
==== Indo-Aryan languages ====
Historically, the retroflex lateral flap (ळ /ɭ/ ) existed in Vedic Sanskrit and was lost in Classical Sanskrit. Today the Indo-Aryan languages in which it exists are Marathi and Konkani (ळ), Odia (ଳ), Gujarati (ળ), most varieties of Rajasthani, Bhili, some dialects of Punjabi language (ਲ਼), most dialects of Western Pahari, Kumaoni, Haryanavi, and the Saharanpur dialect of Northwestern Kauravi. Of these, Konkani, Rajasthani, Bhili, and Kumaoni, Haryanavi, and the Saharanpur dialect use the Devanagari script. The retroflex lateral flap does not exist in most other Indo-Aryan Indian languages.

==== South Indian languages ====
The retroflex lateral flap (ळ /ɭ/ ) exists in many Dravidian languages such as Telugu (ళ), Malayalam (ള), Kannada (ಳ), and Tamil (ள). It was once present in Sinhala (as ළ).

=== Eyelash reph / raphar ===
The eyelash reph / raphar (रेफ/ रफार) (र्‍) exists in Marathi as well as Nepali. The eyelash reph / raphar (र्‍) is produced in Unicode by the sequence [ra र ] + [virāma ्] + [ZWJ] and [rra ऱ ]+ [virāma ्] + [ZWJ]. In Marathi, when ‘र’ is the first consonant of a consonant cluster and occurs at the beginning of a syllable, it is written as an eyelash reph / raphar.

Examples
तर्‍हा
वाऱ्याचा
ऱ्हास
ऱ्हस्व
सुऱ्या
दोऱ्या

==== Minimal pairs ====
| Using the (Simple) Reph / Raphar | Using the Eyelash Reph / Raphar |
|---|---|
| आचार्यास (to the teacher) | आचार्‍यास (to the cook) |
| दर्या (ocean) | दर्‍या (valleys) |

While common computer fonts may not provide both the eyelash and the simple reph/ rapahar or default to the simple raphar in QWERTY-keyboard based typing, a common instruction while writing by hand for the "ry" consonant cluster specifically was to use the simple raphar (common with Sanskrit) for Sanskrit-based loanwords (Tatsama) and those words from other languages which have a half-R in the nominative case (the Persian "darya" or "dariya," meaning ocean, as shown above), while the eyelash reph (also known as the "in the stomach" form, akin to a dagger to the "belly" of the Y, in colloquial usage) was to be used with pluralizations and stem forms of R-ending words ("valleys" and "cook" in the above example).

== Printing ==
Before printing in Marathi was possible, the Modi script was used for writing prose, and balabodha was used for writing poetry. When printing in Marathi became possible, choosing between Modi and balabodha was a problem. William Carey published the first book on Marathi grammar in 1805 using balabodha since printing in the Modi script was not available to him in Serampore, Bengal. At the time, Marathi books were generally written in balabodha. However, subsequent editions of William Carey's book on Marathi grammar, starting in 1810, did employ the Modi script.

== As primary style ==
On 25 July 1917, the Bombay Presidency decided to replace the Modi script with balabodha as the primary script of administration, for convenience and uniformity with the other areas of the presidency. The Modi script continued to be taught in schools until several decades later and continued to be used as an alternate script to Balabodha. The script was still widely used, until the 1940s, by the people of older generations for personal and financial uses.

However, the use of Modi diminished since then and now Balabodha is the primary script used to write Marathi.

== Korku language ==
In addition to Marathi, balabodha is also used to write the Korku language of the Munda subdivision Austroasiatic language family, which is spoken by the Korku people who live in parts of Maharashtra and Madhya Pradesh.

== See also ==
- Modi script, the other Marathi script
