= Kamala Sen-Khatri =

Kusunda-language activist

- Born: Dang district, Nepal
- Other names: Kamala Sen; Kamala Khatri; Kamala Kusunda
- Occupations: Language activist; teacher
- Relatives: Gyani Maiya Sen-Kusunda (sister)

Kamala Sen-Khatri (also known as Kamala Sen, Kamala Khatri and Kamala Kusunda) is a language activist from Nepal. As of 2023, she is known as the sole living fluent native speaker of the language isolate Kusunda language which was nearing extinction in the 2000s. She is involved in reviving the language by speaking, contributing in language data archiving and teaching it to young children. Sen-Khatri is the younger sister of the late Gyani Maiya Sen-Kusunda.

== Early life ==
Kamala Sen-Khatri was born in the Dang district of Nepal to a family of hunter-gatherers and settled in the Kulmor village in Dang. Her mother's name is Puni Thakuri and noted Kusunda elder Gyani Maiya Sen-Kusunda was her sister. She, her mother and sister spoke Kusunda until Thakuri's death in 1985, after which she moved to India for work and Sen-Kusunda was mistakenly assumed to be the sole Kusunda speaker.

== Career ==
The Kusunda language was presumed extinct multiple times due to systemic decline and poor language data archiving, most notably in 2018 after the death of community elder Rajamama Kusunda and later in 2020 after the death of Gyani Maiya Sen-Kusunda. In 2010, the Tribhuvan University ran a language documentation and preservation programme by inviting both Sen-Kusunda and Sen-Khatri to Kathmandu, but the project stalled due to shortage of funds. In 2012, there were reports of three Kusunda speakers, including Sen-Khatri and Sen-Kusunda. Since 2019, Sen-Khatri started contributing to language data collection by researcher Uday Raj Aaley and linguist Timotheus Adrianus Bodt. She is assisting Aaley in developing language materials for teaching Kusunda to children in Ghorahi in a Nepal Language Commission-supported education project. As of 2023, Sen-Khatri is known to be the only living fluent native Kusunda speaker.
