= Kusunda language =

Endangered language isolate of Nepal

Kusunda
- Gemehaq gipan
- Pronunciation: [gemʰjaχ gipən]
- Native to: Nepal
- Region: Gandaki Province, Lumbini Province
- Ethnicity: 253 Kusunda (2021 census)
- Native speakers: 1 (2023)
- Revival: Classes available
- Language family: Language isolate
- Writing system: Devanagari

Language codes
- ISO 639-3: kgg
- Glottolog: kusu1250
- ELP: Kusunda
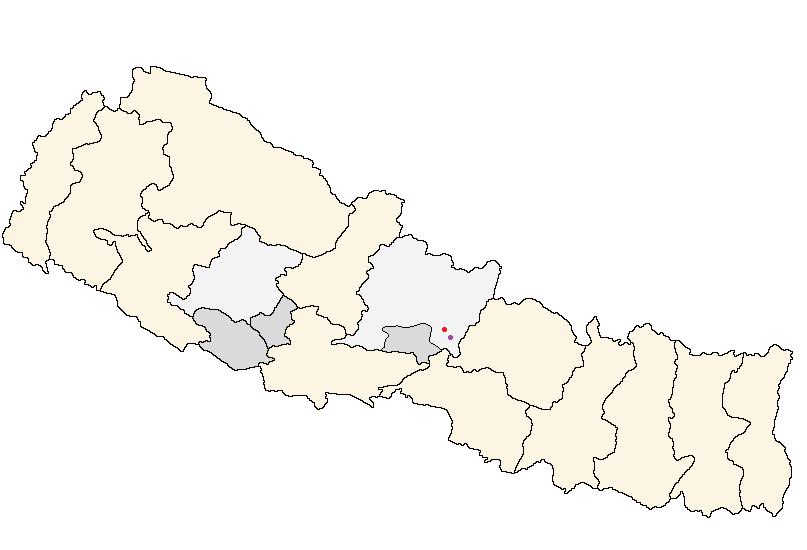
- Ethnologue locations: (west) Dang and Pyuthan districts (dark grey) within Lumbini Province; (center) Tanahun District within Gandaki Province; EndangeredLanguages.com location: red WALS location: purple (Gorkha District)

Kusunda or Kusanda (endonym Gemehaq gipan Kusunda: [gemʰjaχ] [gipən]) is a language isolate spoken by a few among the Kusunda people in western and central Nepal. As of 2023, it only has a single fluent speaker, Kamala Sen-Khatri, although there are efforts underway to keep the language alive. There were 23 native speakers according to the 2021 Nepal census.

== History ==
Kusunda elder Gyani Maiya Sen-Kusunda discussing with Uday Raj Aaley the endangerment of Kusunda in documentary Gyani Maiya (2019)

For decades the Kusunda language was thought to be on the verge of extinction, with little hope of ever knowing it well. The little material that could be gleaned from the memories of former speakers suggested that the language was an isolate, but, without much evidence, it was often classified along with its neighbors as Tibeto-Burman. However, in 2004 three Kusundas, Gyani Maya Sen, Prem Bahadur Shahi and Kamala Singh, were brought to Kathmandu for help with citizenship papers. There, members of Tribhuvan University discovered that one of them, a native of Sakhi VDC in southern Rolpa District, was a fluent speaker of the language. Several of her relatives were also discovered to be fluent. In 2005 there were known to be seven or eight fluent speakers of the language, the youngest in her thirties. However the language is moribund, with no children learning it, since all Kusunda speakers have married outside their ethnicity.

It was presumed that the language became extinct with the death of Rajamama Kusunda on 19 April 2018. However, Gyani Maiya Sen and her sister Kamala Sen-Khatri contributed in further data collection, language training and revival of the language. The sisters, together with author and researcher Uday Raj Aaley, have been teaching the language to interested children and adults.

Aaley, the facilitator and Kusunda-language teacher, has written the book Kusunda Tribe and Dictionary. The book has a compilation of more than 1000 words from the Kusunda language. Uday Raj Aaley and Timotheus A. Bodt published “New Kusunda data: A list of 250 concepts,” in 2020. Nepal Archive has offered a free online basic to advanced level language lessons in their website.

== Classification ==
David E. Watters published a mid-sized grammatical description of the language, plus vocabulary (Watters 2005), although further works have been published since. He argued that Kusunda is indeed a language isolate, not just genealogically but also lexically, grammatically and phonologically distinct from its neighbors. This would imply that Kusunda is a remnant of the languages spoken in northern India before the influx of Tibeto-Burman- and Indo-Iranian-speaking peoples; however it is not classified as a Munda nor a Dravidian language. It thus joins Burushaski, Nihali and (potentially) the substrate of the Vedda language in the list of South Asian languages that do not fall into the main categories of Indo-European, Dravidian, Sino-Tibetan, and Austroasiatic.

Before the recent discovery of active Kusunda speakers there had been several attempts to link the language to an established language family. B.K. Rana (2002) maintained that Kusunda was a Tibeto-Burman language as traditionally classified. Merritt Ruhlen argued for a relationship with Juwoi and other Andamanese languages; and for a larger Indo-Pacific language family, with them and other languages, including Nihali.

Others have linked Kusunda to Munda (see Watters 2005); Yeniseian (Gurov 1989); Burushaski and Caucasian (Reinhard and Toba 1970; this would be a variant of Gurov's proposal if Sino-Caucasian were accepted); and the Nihali isolate in central India (Fleming 1996, Whitehouse 1997). More recently a relationship between Kusunda, Yeniseian and Burushaski has been proposed.

== Phonology ==
=== Vowels ===
Phonetically, Kusunda has six vowels in two harmonic groups, which are arguably three vowels phonemically: a word will normally have vowels from the upper (pink, italic) or lower (green) set, but not both simultaneously. There are very few words that consistently have either always upper or always lower vowels; most words may be pronounced either way, though those with uvular consonants require the lower set (as in many languages). There are a few words with no uvular consonants that still bar such dual pronunciations, though these generally only feature the distinction in careful enunciation.

Kusunda vowels
Vowels	Front	Central	Back
Close	i		u
Mid	e	ə	o
Open		a	

=== Consonants ===
Kusunda consonants seem to only contrast the active articulator, not where that articulator makes contact. For example, apical consonants may be dental, alveolar, retroflex, or palatal: /t/ is dental [t̪] before /i/, alveolar [t͇] before /e, ə, u/, retroflex [ʈ] before /o, a/, and palatal [c] when there is a following uvular, as in [coq] ~ [t͇ok] ('we').

In addition, many consonants vary between stops and fricatives; for instance, /p/ seems to surface as [b] between vowels, while /b/ surfaces as [β] in the same environment. Aspiration appears to be recent to the language. Kusunda also lacks the retroflex consonant phonemes that are common to the region, and is unique in the region in having uvular consonants.

		Labial	Coronal		Palatal	Velar	Uvular	Glottal
		Labial	plain	sibilant	Palatal	Velar	Uvular	Glottal
Nasal		m	n			ŋ	ɴˤ	
Stop	voiceless	p~b	t~d	t͡s		k~ɡ	q~ɢ	ʔ
Stop	voiced	b~β	d	d͡z		ɡ~ɣ		
Stop	aspirated	(pʰ)	(tʰ)	(t͡sʰ)		(kʰ~x)	(qʰ)	
Stop	breathy	(bʱ)	(dʱ)	(d͡zʱ)		(ɡʱ)		
Fricative				s			ʁ~ʕ	h
Approximant		w	l		j		ʁ~ʕ	
Flap			ɾ					

[ʕ] does not occur initially, and [ŋ] only occurs at the end of a syllable, unlike in neighboring languages. [ɴˤ] only occurs between vowels; it may be |ŋ+ʕ|.

== Pronouns ==
Kusunda has several cases, marked on nouns and pronouns, three of which are the nominative (Kusunda, unlike its neighbors, has no ergativity), genitive, and accusative.

	Nominative	Genitive	Accusative
1st person, singular	tsi	tsi, tsi-yi	tən-da
1st person, plural	tok	tig-i	(toʔ-da)
2nd person, singular	nu	nu, ni-yi	nən-da
2nd person, plural	nok	^{?}nig-i	(noʔ-da)
3rd person	gina	(gina-yi)	gin-da

Other case suffixes include -ma "together with", -lage "for", -əna "from", -ga, -gə "at, in".

There are also demonstrative pronouns na and ta. Although it is not clear what the difference between them is, it may be animacy.

Subjects may be marked on the verb, though when they are they may either be prefixed or suffixed. An example with am "eat", which is more regular than many verbs, in the present tense (-ən) is,

am "eat"
	Singular	Plural
1st person	t-əm-ən	t-əm-da-n
2nd person	n-əm-ən	n-əm-da-n
3rd person	g-əm-ən	g-əm-da-n

Other verbs may have a prefix ts- in the first person, or zero in the third.

== Negation ==
Donohue, Gautam & Pokharel (2014) argue that Kusunda lacks an unambiguous means of negating declarative verbal main clauses, with the suffix -u marking a more general irrealis, with negation as one of its possible functions, contrary to the analysis in Watters et al. (2006), which had described several negative verbal suffixes, such as -aˤu, -daˤu, -wa.

Imperative clauses do distinguish polarity unambiguously, with the suffix -go for commands and -nin for prohibitives:

libuŋ ə-go
play do-IMP
'Play!'

libuŋ ə-nin
play do-PROH
'Don't play!'

Nonverbal predicates can also be clearly negated, using the negator otoq ('is not') for identity or the negative existential qaʕ-u ('does not exist') for existence:

tsi-je gimi
1SG-GEN money
'(That's) my money.'

tsi-je gimi otoq
1SG-GEN money NEG
'(That's) not my money.'

For non-imperative verbal clauses, however, no dedicated negative morpheme exists. What Watters et al. (2006) had analyzed as negative suffixes, such as -aʕu and -daʕu, are reanalyzed by Donohue et al. as combinations of the nominalizing suffix -da (expressing a "manifest characteristic") with the negative existential qaʕ-u. The resulting construction literally asserts the nonexistence of a nominalized property. For example:

gina g-əm-da qaʕ-u
3SG 3-eat-CHAR not.exist-IRR
'He/she did not eat.'

Two pieces of evidence support the reanalysis. First, the clitic -ba ('also, even') can be inserted between the nominalized verb and the negative existential, indicating a word boundary rather than a single suffix.

gina g-əm-da-ba qaʕ-u
3SG 3-eat-CHAR-also not.exist-IRR
'He/she did not even eat'

Second, the construction is incompatible with future time reference, which follows from the semantics of -da, since it refers to an already-realized characteristic.

*goraq gina g-əm-da qaʕ-u
tomorrow 3SG 3-eat-CHAR not.exist-IRR
'He/she will not eat tomorrow'

To express negation in future contexts, the only available strategy is the irrealis suffix -u, but this is inherently ambiguous between positive and negative readings:

goraq gina g-əm-u-a
tomorrow 3SG 3-eat-IRR-OPT
'He/she will not eat tomorrow.' / 'He/she will eat tomorrow.'

This situation is typologically unusual, since most known languages have some unambiguous way of negating verbal predicates across all tense contexts.

== Proto-language ==
Proto-Kusunda
- Reconstruction of: Kusunda language

=== Morphology ===
Proto-Kusunda pre-root nominal prefixes can be categorized into a two-slot system, with the possessor prefix attached before the classificatory prefix, which in turn comes before the root noun (for example, *g-u-hu 'bone' and *g-i-dzi 'name').

	possessor prefix (-2)	classificatory prefix (-1)
1st person	*t-	*i- (external body parts, abstractions)
2nd person	*n-	*a-
3rd person	*g-	*u- (internal body parts), *ja- (human beings)

The proposed class markers *i-, *a-, *u-, and *ja- are proposed to be triggered by the possessive-marking prefixes *t-, *n-, and *g-. The system is reminiscent of nominal morphology in the Great Andamanese languages.

=== Lexicon ===
Below are some Proto-Kusunda lexical reconstructions from Spendley (2024), based on data of different Kusunda dialects from Hodgson (1857) and Reinhard & Toba (1970).

Gyani Maiya Sen-Kusunda showing body parts and pronouncing their respective names in Kusunda

gloss	Proto-Kusunda
arm	*i-muq; *a-wai
below	*a-ma
blood	*u-ju
bone	*g-u-hu
child	*ja-ti
ear	*i-au
eye	*i-niN
father	*ja-hi
foot, leg	*i-aN
friend	*ja-mti
hole	*au
knee	*u-putu
mother-in-law	*g-ja-ku[g/dz]i
mouth	*a/u-ta
name	*g-i-dzi
nose	*i-nau
skin	*i-tat
stomach	*a-mat
tongue	*u-dziŋ
tooth	*u-hu

== See also ==
- Kusunda Swadesh list (basic vocabulary)
- Kusunda word list (1127 words)
- Gyani Maiya Sen-Kusunda
- Kamala Sen-Khatri
- Uday Raj Aaley
- Burushaski
- Nihali language
- Substratum in Munda languages
