= Mawasi =

Mawasi may refer to:

- Al-Mawasi, Rafah, or Mawasi, a Palestinian Bedouin town on the southern coast of the Gaza Strip
- Mawasi, the largest of the four subgroups of the Korku people in India, and also the name of the dialect they speak
