= David Watters =

David Watters may refer to:

- David E. Watters (1944-2009), American educator
- David H. Watters (born 1950), New Hampshire politician
