= Gadaba people =

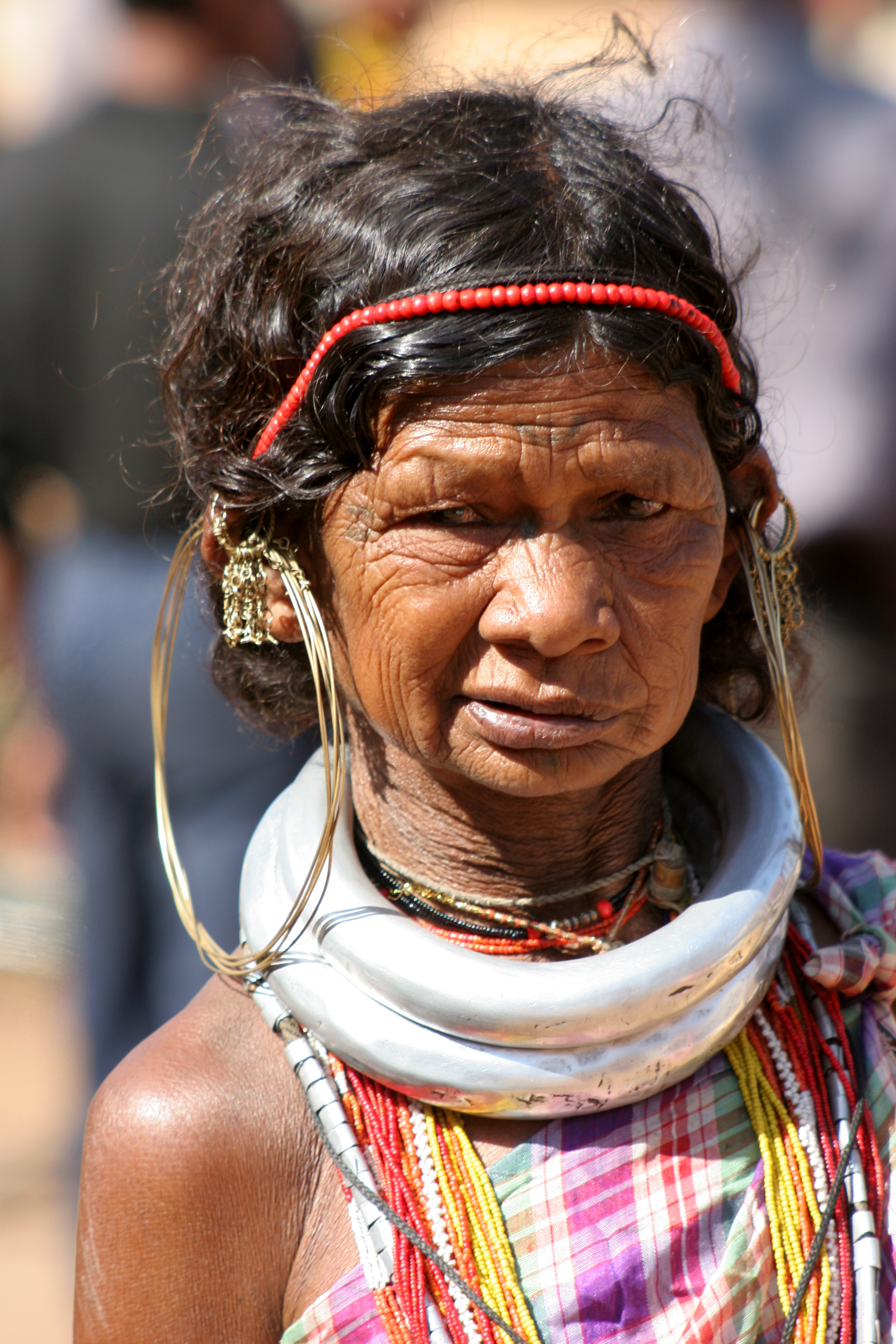
- A Gadaba woman in traditional attire

Total population
- 122,770 (2011 Census)

Regions with significant populations
- India
- Odisha: 84,689
- Andhra Pradesh: 38,081

Languages
- Gutob, Ollari, Kondekor

Religion
- Hinduism, Animism

Related ethnic groups
- Munda peoples

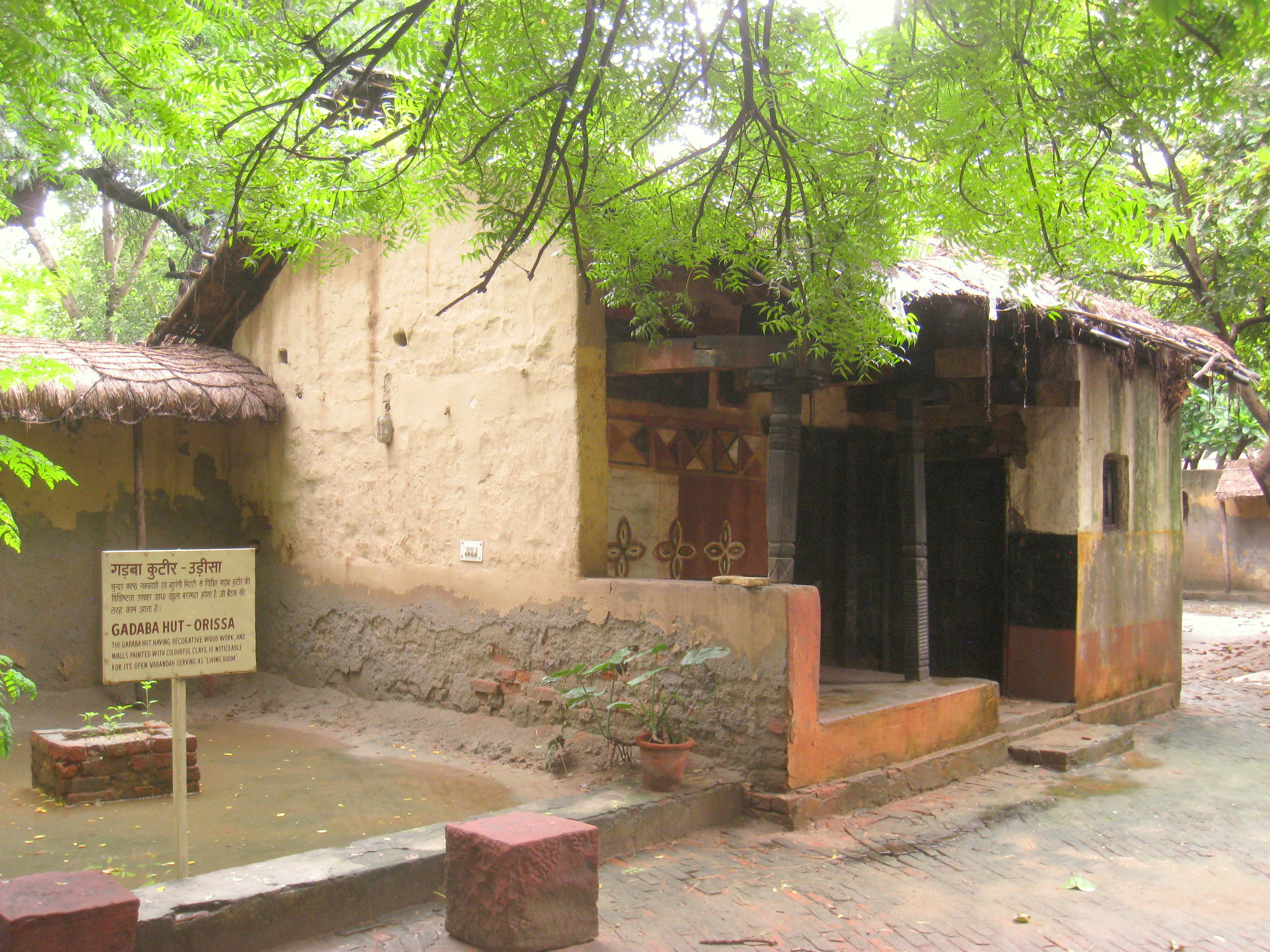
A traditional Gadaba hut

The Gadaba or Gutob people are an ethnic group of eastern India. They are classified as a Scheduled Tribe (ST) in Andhra Pradesh and Odisha.

There are 84,689 Gadabas in Odisha and 38,081 in Andhra Pradesh as per the 2011 Indian census. The subgroups of Gadaba are Bada Gadaba, Sana Gadaba, Gutab Gadaba, Farenga Gadaba and Allar Gadaba. Their socioeconomic life is based on farming and daily labour. They are involved in both Slash-and-burn and plow cultivation. They live in permanent villages. They are well known for their tribal dance, the Dhemsa. The Gadabas speak Gutob and Ollari, which are Austroasiatic and Dravidian languages respectively. Since the early 1980s the Gadabas have largely been displaced from their villages by the building of hydro-electric dams and the resulting lakes.

Gadaba women traditionally wear neck rings which are about 500-700 grams each and can not be removed without the help of a blacksmith. As a part of their tradition, it is only removed after their death. A Gadaba woman traditionally wears a two-piece dress which is very colorful, often striped in red, blue and white, which is woven by the women themselves. The ornaments they wear are not very different from those of other tribes.
