= Allari =

Allari (Telugu: అల్లరి) may refer to:

== Film ==
- Allari (film), a 2002 Telugu film
- Allari Mogudu, a 1992 Telugu film
- Allari Priyudu, a 1993 Telugu film
- Allari Premikudu, a 1994 Telugu film
- Allari Bullodu, a 2005 Telugu film
- Allari Pidugu, a 2005 Telugu film
- Allare Allari, a 2006 Telugu film

== People ==
- Allari Naresh, a Telugu film actor

== Language ==
- Ollari language
