= Gyani Maiya Sen-Kusunda =

Kusunda community elder (1937–2020)

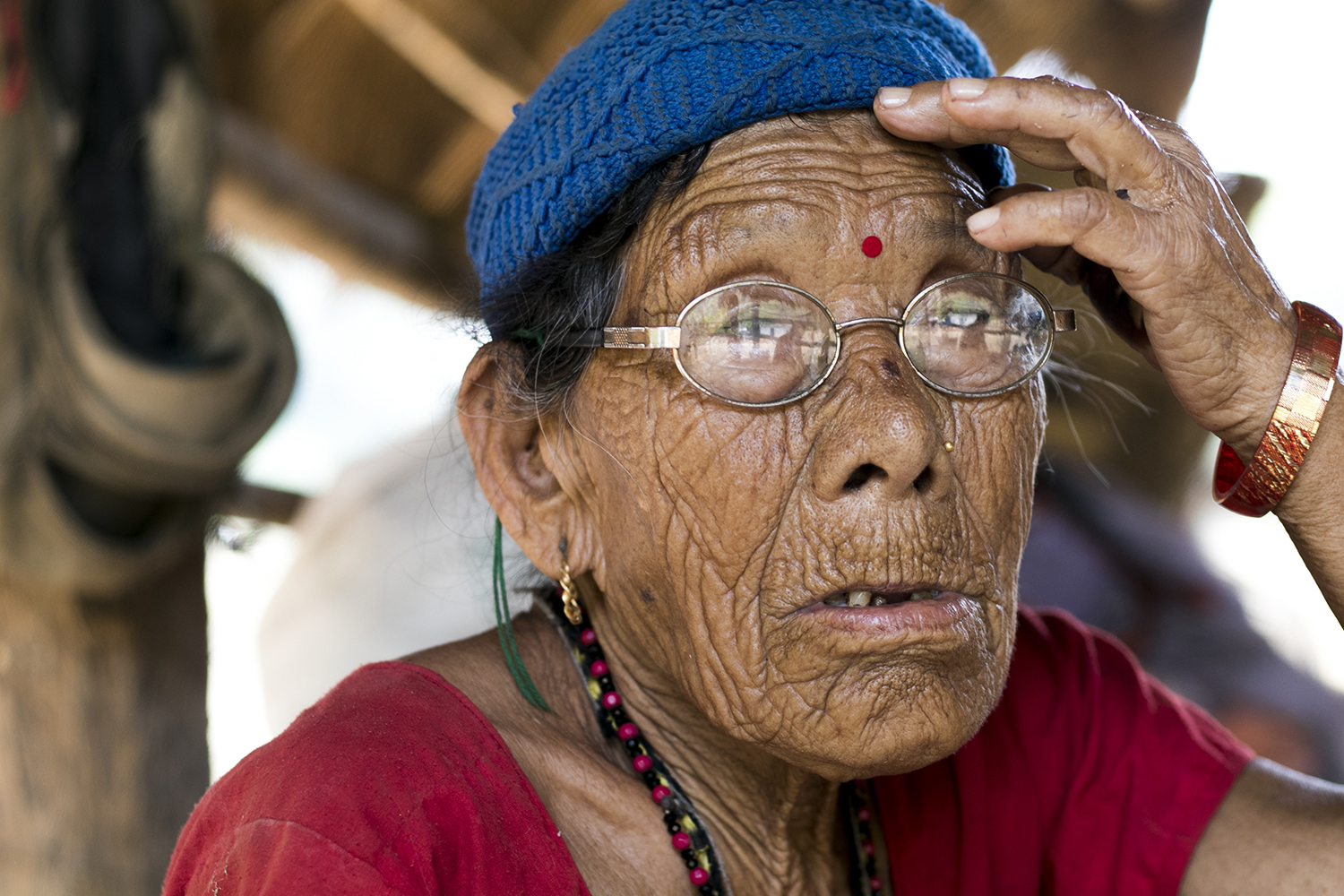
- Gyani Maiya Sen Kusunda in 2018
- Born: 1937
- Died: January 25, 2020 (aged 82–83); Kulmor, Dang District, Nepal, Nepal
- Other names: Gyani Maiya, Gyani Maiya Sen
- Relatives: Kamala Sen-Khatri (sister)

Gyani Maiya Sen-Kusunda (1937 – 25 January 2020) was a Kusunda community elder from Nepal. She was presumed to be the last known speaker of Kusunda, a language isolate listed as the critically endangered language in the Atlas of the World's Languages in Danger. Sen-Kusunda could not converse with others in her community in Kusunda despite being fluent as the language fell out of use over time after the nomadic Kusunda community started to settle in villages and married outside the community. She was interviewed widely by linguists and other scholars in an effort to document the Kusunda language.

She died on 25 January 2020.

== Early life ==
Sen-Kusunda was born in 1937 in the Dang district of Nepal to a family of hunter-gatherers and settled in the Kulmor village in Dang. Her mother's name is Puni Thakuri and sister's name is Kamala Sen-Khatri. She and her mother and sister spoke Kusunda until Thakuri's death in 1985, after which Khatri moved to India for work. Then, Sen-Kusunda was believed to be the sole Kusunda speaker. But later in 2012, there were reports of three Kusunda speakers, including the two sisters. In 2010, the Tribhuvan University ran a language documentation and preservation programme by inviting both Sen-Kusunda and Sen-Khatri to Kathmandu, but the project stalled due to shortage of funds.

Sen-Kusunda discusses with Uday Raj Aaley the endangerment of the Kusunda language

== Career ==
Sen-Kusunda worked with scholars including B.K. Rana, Brian Houghton Hodgson, David E. Watters, Johan Reinhard, Madhav Prasad Pokharel and Uday Raj Aaley for the documentation of the Kusunda language.
