= Chinthalatana =

Chinthalatana R&R Colony
- Smart village
- Nickname: cnt
- Location in Telangana, India
- Coordinates: 18°26′58.7″N 78°51′23.4″E
- Country: India
- State: Telangana
- District: Rajanna Sircilla
- Mandal: Vemulawada
- Established: 2015
- Founder: SWAN Association

Government
  - Type: Panchayati Raj
  - Body: Gram Panchayat

Population (2020)
  - Total: ~5,000

Languages
  - Official: Telugu
- Time zone: UTC+5:30 (IST)
- PIN: 505302
- Vehicle registration: TS-23
- Website: chinthalatana.com

Chinthalatana R&R Colony is a smart village located in Vemulawada Mandal, Rajanna Sircilla, Telangana, India. Chinthalatana is under the constituency of Vemulawada. Chinthalatana is a newly formed village due to submergence for Mid Manair Dam it has a capacity of 25.87 tmcft with 25 radial gates. It has a capacity to irrigate 2,00,000 acres.

In the village, people of all religions are living together. There are the religious temples of Renuka Yellamma, Pochamma, and Hanuman, etc. where all cultures and religions celebrate their festivals together. A major ceremony held is "Dussehra" at the time of Vijayadashami. Ganesh Chaturthi is also celebrated. The UPS school has constructed buildings and playgrounds. In spite of the huge competition from the present better studies, the students of this UPS school are showing their talent public exams by getting top marks in district level. The sarpanch of the village is Regulapati Rani.

== Demographics ==
As of 2001 India census, Chinthalatana had a population of 500. Males constitute 51% of the population and females 49%. Chinthalatana has an average literacy rate of 54%, lower than the national average of 59.5%: male literacy is 67% and, female literacy is 40%. In Chinthalatana, 12% of the population is under 6 years of age.
