= Nihali language =

Language spoken in India

Nihali
- निहाली, नहाली
- Native to: India
- Region: Jalgaon Jamod, Buldhana district, Maharashtra (on the border with Madhya Pradesh)
- Ethnicity: 5,000 Nihali
- Native speakers: 2,500 (2016)
- Language family: Language isolate

Language codes
- ISO 639-3: nll
- Glottolog: niha1238
- ELP: Nihali
- Historically Nihali-speaking area spanning the border between Maharashtra to the south and Madhya Pradesh to the north

- Nihali is classified as Critically Endangered by the UNESCO Atlas of the World's Languages in Danger

Nihali, also known as Nahali (निहाली, नहाली Nihālī, Nahālī, pronounced [nihaːliː, nahaːliː]), is an endangered language isolate that is spoken in west-central India by approximately 2,500 people as of 2016. The name of the language derives from nahāl, meaning "tiger".

Nihali has not been definitively proven to be related to any other surrounding language families of South Asia, such as Munda, Indo-Aryan, and Dravidian languages, nor to other language isolates like Burushaski and Kusunda. However, a connection with Ainu has been suggested.

== Linguistic situation ==
The Nihali tribal area is just south of the Tapti River spanning the border between Maharashtra and Madhya Pradesh around Buldhana district and Burhanpur district. However, only the villages in the Buldhana district - Jamod, Sonbardi, Kuvardev, Chalthana, Ambavara, Wasali, and Cicari - still use the Nihali language today. There are dialectal differences between the Jamod-Sonbardi and the Kuvardev-Chalthana varieties. Historically, Nihali was spoken around the village of Tembi in Burhanpur district as well.

Today there are no longer any monolingual speakers of the language, as Nihali speakers are likely to speak varieties of Korku, Marathi, or Hindi among others. There is no established writing system for the language.

== History ==
The early history of Nihali is unclear, as there are no direct attestations of the Nihali language prior to the modern era. One theory suggests that the Nihali people might trace back to the ancient community of Nahalka, an offshoot of the Nishada tribe mentioned in the Mahabharata and the Padma Purana.

Franciscus Kuiper was the first to suggest that Nihali may be unrelated to any other Indian language, with the non-Korku, non-Dravidian core vocabulary being the remnant of an earlier population in India. However, he did not rule out that it may be a Munda language, like Korku. Kuiper suggested that Nihali may differ from neighbouring languages, such as Korku, mostly in its function as an anti-language. Kuiper's assertions stem, in part, from the fact that many oppressed groups within India have used secret languages to prevent outsiders from understanding them.

For centuries, most Nihalis have often worked as agricultural labourers, for speakers of languages other than their own. In particular, Nihali labourers have often worked for members of the Korku people, and are often bilingual in the Korku language. Because of this history, Nihali is sometimes used only to prevent non-Nihali speaking outsiders from understanding them. Some commonalities between Nihali and Gondi vocabulary also suggest that the Nihali people may have historically lived with the Gondi people or another Dravidian-speaking peoples in the area, before reaching the present settlements.

The Nihali live similarly to the Kalto people. That and the fact that the Kalto language has often been called Nahali led to confusion of the two languages. Some Korku-speakers refuse to acknowledge the Nihali as a distinct community, and describe the emergence of the Nihalis as resulting from a disruption of Korku civil society.

Linguist Norman Zide describes the recent history of the language as follows: "Nihali's borrowings are far more massive than in such textbook examples of heavy outside acquisition as Albanian." In this respect, says Zide, modern Nihali seems comparable to hybridised dialects of Romani spoken in Western Europe. Zide claims that this is a result of a historical process that began with a massacre of Nihalis in the early 19th century, organised by one of the rulers of the area, supposedly in response to "marauding". Zide alleges that, afterwards, the Nihalis "decimated in size", have "functioned largely as raiders and thieves ... who [have] disposed of ... stolen goods" through "outside associates". Zide adds that Nihali society has "long been multilingual, and uses Nihali as a more or less secret language which is not ordinarily revealed to outsiders" and that early researchers "attempting to learn the language were, apparently, deliberately rebuffed or misled".

== Phonology ==
Vowel phonemes of Nihali
	Front		Back	
	short	long	short	long
Close	i	iː	u	uː
Mid	e	eː	o	oː
Open			a	aː

Lengthening of vowels is phonemic. The vowels [e] and [o] have lower varieties at the end of morphemes.

Nasalization is rare and tends to occur in borrowed words.

Consonant phonemes of Nihali
		Labial	Dental/ Alveolar	Retroflex	Palatal	Velar
Nasal		m	n	ɳ	ɲ	
Plosive/ Affricate	voiceless	p	t	ʈ	tʃ	k
Plosive/ Affricate	aspirated	pʰ	tʰ	ʈʰ	tʃʰ	kʰ
Plosive/ Affricate	voiced	b	d	ɖ	dʒ	ɡ
Plosive/ Affricate	breathy	bʱ	dʱ	ɖʱ	dʒʱ	ɡʱ
Fricative			s	ʂ	ʃ	h
Rhotic			r	ɽ		
Approximant		ʋ	l		j	

There are 33 consonants. Unaspirated stops are more frequent than aspirated stops.

== Lexicon ==
The language has a very large number of words adopted from neighboring languages, with 60–70% apparently taken from the Munda Korku language, from Dravidian languages (ṭoːl "skin"; coːpo "salt"), and from Indo-Aryan languages. However, much of its core vocabulary, such as corṭo "blood" and kalen "egg", cannot be related to them nor any other languages. Less than 25% of the language's ancestral vocabulary seems to be in use.

Below are some Nihali basic vocabulary words without clear external parallels (in Korku, Hindi, Marathi, Dravidian, etc.) listed in the appendix of Nagaraja (2014).

Body parts

head	peːñ
hair (head)	kuguso
eye	jikit
ear	cigam
nose	coːn
tooth	menge
mouth	kaggo
hand	bakko
shoulder	ṭ/tagli
intestines	koṭor
navel	bumli
liver	gadri
blood	corṭo
bone	paːkṭo

Animals and plants

bird	poe, pyu
egg	kalen
snake	koːgo
fish	caːn
louse	keːpe
mosquito	kaːn
fly (insect)	eḍ(u)go
tree	aːḍḍo

Natural phenomena

water	joppo
rain	maːnḍo
stone	caːgo, caːrgo

Material culture, kinship

road, path	ḍãːy
house	aːwaːr
name	jumu

Verbs

In Nihali, many verbs are suffixed with -be.

eat	ṭyeː-, tyeː-
drink	ḍelen-
bite	haru-
blow	bigi-, bhigi-
die	betto-, beṭṭo-
kill	paḍa-
laugh	haːgo-
cry, weep	aːpa-
go	eːr-, eṛe-
come	paːṭo, pya
give	beː-
see	ara-
hear	cakni-

== Pronouns and demonstratives ==
The personal pronouns in Nihali are:

	singular	dual	plural
1st person	jo	tye:ko	ingi
2nd person	ne	na:ko	la
3rd person	eṭey	hiṭkel	eṭla < eṭey + la

The table below compares the demonstrative paradigm between Nihali and Korku, the surrounding Munda language.

	Nihali	Korku
'what'	nan	co:(ch)
'who'	nani	je
'why'	naway, nawa:san	co:- ~ co:ch
‘when’	meran ~ miran	co:-la
‘where’	mingay	ṭone ~ ṭongan 'at where'
‘how much’	m(i)yan	co-ṭo
‘how’	naw-ki	co-phar
‘whose’	nan-in	je-konṭe ‘whose child’
‘which (book)’	nu-san	(pustak) ṭone-bukko ‘which (book)’

== Morphosyntax ==
Nihali morphosyntax is much simpler than that of Korku and other Munda languages, and is unrelated to that of Munda languages. Word order is SOV.

Sample sentences

nani hi palso-ki duːdo delenkamay
who this child-to milk gave
"Who gave milk to this child?"

kyamp jo minga-ka-bi beṭhe eːr
tomorrow I anywhere neg go
"I will not go anywhere tomorrow."

== See also ==
- Nihali Swadesh list (207 most basic words)
- Nihali word list (1,694 words)
- Burushaski language
- Kusunda language
- Substratum in Munda languages
