= List of villages in Rajura taluka =

List of all villages and towns in Rajura Taluka of Chandrapur district, Maharashtra India.

== A ==
- Aheri
- Annur
- Antargaon
- Antargaon Kh.
- Arvi
- Amrutguda

== B ==
- Babapur
- Bamanwada
- Bambezari
- Belampur
- Berdi
- Bhadangpur
- Bhedoda
- Bhendala
- Bhendvi
- Bhurkunda Kh.
- Bhurkunda Bk
- Botgaon

== C ==
- Chanakha
- Chandanwahi
- Charli
- Chinchala
- Chinchbodi
- Chincholi Bk.
- Chincholi Kh.
- Chirud
- Chunala

== D ==
- Dewada
- Dhanora
- Dhidsi
- Dongargaon

== G ==
- Ghotta
- Goraj
- Gowari
- Goyegaon

== H ==
- Hardona Bk.
- Hardona Kh.
- Hirapur
- Hirapur

== I ==
- Isapur

== J ==
- Jamani
- Jogapur

== K ==
- Kadholi Bk.
- Kakadghat
- Kalamana
- Kapangaon
- Kawadgondi
- Kawathala
- Kawitpeth
- Kelzar
- Khairgaon
- Khambada
- Khamona
- Khirdi
- Kinebodi
- Kochi
- Kohapara
- Kolgaon
- Kostala
- Kurli

== L ==
- Lakkadkot

== M ==
- Mangaon
- Mangi Bk
- Mangi Kh.
- Manoli Bk.
- Manoli Kh.
- Marda
- Mathara
- Murti
- Muthara

== N ==
- Nalphadi
- Navegaon
- Nimbala
- Nirli
- Nokari Bk.
- Nokari Kh.

== P ==
- Pachgaon
- Panchala
- Pandharpauni
- Parsoda
- Pauni
- Pellora
- Pendhari

== R ==
- Rajura
- Rampur
- Ranvelli
- Ruyad

== S ==
- Sakhari
- Sakharwahi
- Satri
- Shirsi
- Siddheshwar
- Sindi
- Sindola
- Sonapur
- Sondo
- Sonurli
- Subai
- Sukadpalli
- Sumthana

== T ==
- Tembhurwahi
- Tulana
- Tummaguda

== U ==
- Umarzara

== V ==
- Vihirgaon
- Vihirgaon

== W ==
- Wangi
- Waroda
- WarurRoad
- Wirur Station

== Y ==
- Yergavhan

== See also ==
- Chandrapur district
- Rajura taluka
