= Nanda ministry =

Nanda ministry may refer to:

- First Nanda ministry, the Interim Indian government headed by Gulzarilal Nanda in 1964
- Second Nanda ministry, the Interim Indian government headed by Gulzarilal Nanda in 1966

== See also ==
- Nanda (disambiguation)
- Gulzarilal Nanda, Indian politician, twice serving as acting prime minister
