= Nanda, Maharashtra =

Village in Maharashtra

Nanda
- Town
- Location in Maharashtra, India
- Coordinates: 19°46′25.87″N 79°8′11.429″E
- Country: India
- State: Maharashtra
- District: Chandrapur

Government
  - Type: [[]]
  - Body: Gram Panchayat

Population (2014)
  - Total: 20,000 approx.

Languages
  - Official: Marathi
  - Other: Telugu, Hindi are also widely spoken
- Time zone: UTC+5:30 (IST)
- <-- PIN -->: 442917
- Telephone code: 07173(area code)
- Vehicle registration: MH 34

Nanda is a town in Chandrapur district in the state of Maharashtra, India.

The town has been called a "mini India" as it has a large number of people from all over India. The reason behind the population diversity is UltraTech Cement, a cement company that created employment opportunities for nearby villagers.

== History ==
Before 1983, Nanda was a village with agriculture as its main economy. But after L&T Cement Plant was established in 1983, the business and population has expanded.

== Demographics ==
Nanda is surrounded by four cement factories. Dust pollution levels are high, but the industry is the main source of income for this area.

Cement Industries nearby :

- UltraTech Cement, Awarpur
- Murali Agro Cement, Naranda
- Manikgarh Cement, Gadchandur
- Ambuja Cement, Upparwahi

Nearby Towns :

- Gadchandur ( 7 km )
- Korpana ( 25 km )
- Rajura ( 31 km )
- Ballarpur ( 38 km )

Nearby Villages :

- Bibi ( 2 km )
- Awarpur ( 2.5 km )
- Pimpalgaon ( 4 km )
- Duddeery ( 1km )

== Transport ==
Nanda have road transport State Transport ( ST ) and private bus transport facility direct to Nagpur.

== Education ==
Nanda have several esteemed educational institutions. Some of the private educational institutes are:

- Aditya Birla Public School Awarpur
- Shri Shivaji English School & Jr. College
- Prabhu Ramchandra School & College
- Jawaharlal Nehru School Awarpur
- Priyadarshini vidyalya nanda

== Economy ==
UltraTech Cement is the major employer in this area. Many people migrated to Nanda area due to this cement plant.

Nanda has a local economy of stores and businesses serving the localities and nearby villages.
