= Kusunda people =

Kusunda
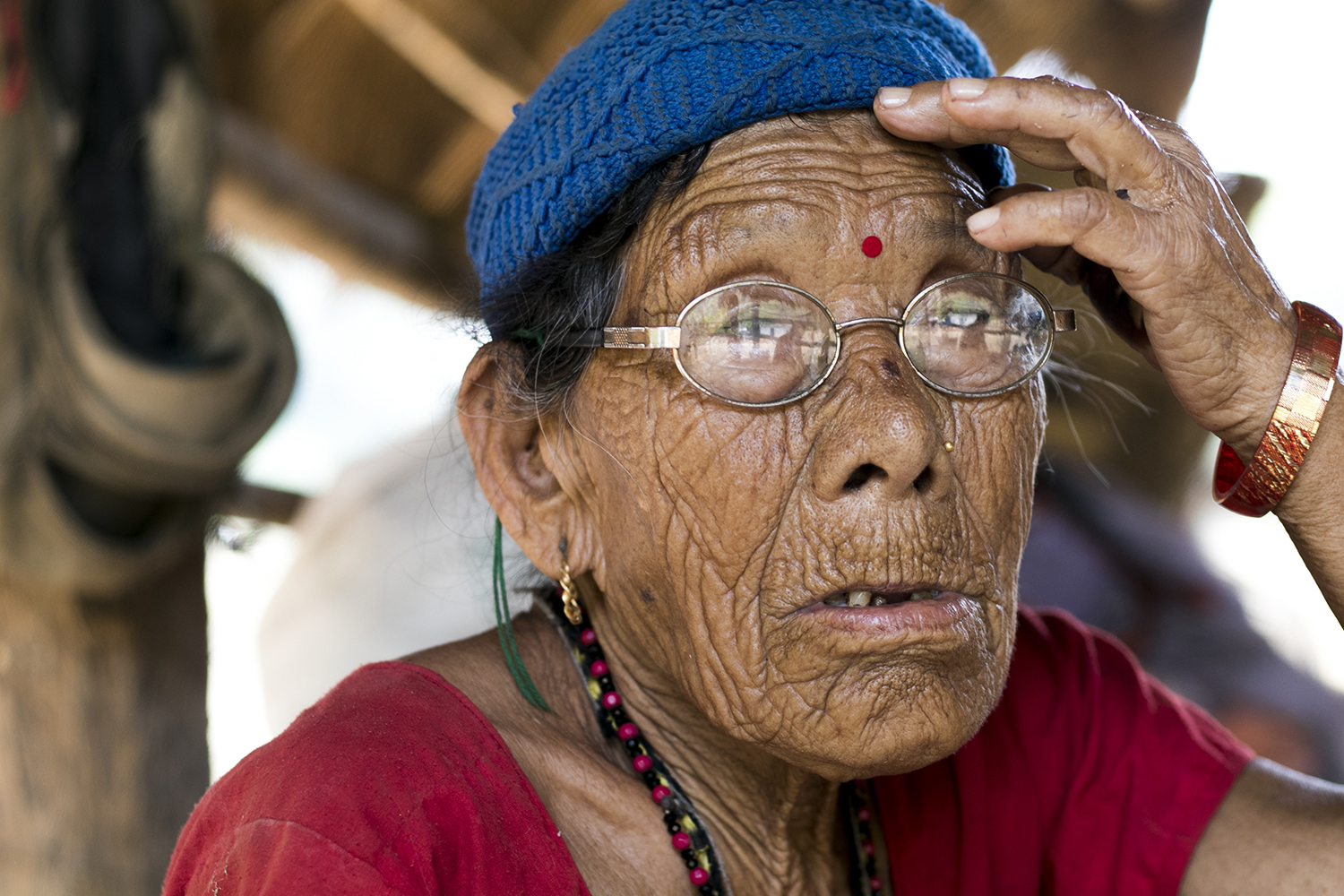
- Kusunda elder Gyani Maiya Sen-Kusunda (1937–2020) in 2019

Total population
- c. 253 (2021)

Regions with significant populations
- Nepal

Languages
- Kusunda language

Community elder Gyani Maiya Sen-Kusunda discusses the endangerment of the Kusunda language in eponymous 2019 documentary Gyani Maiya

The Kusunda (Nepali: कुसुन्डा जाति) or Ban Raja ("people of the forest"), known to themselves as the Mihaq or Myahq or Myahak, are a tribe of former hunter-gatherers of the forests of western Nepal, who are now intermarried with neighboring peoples and settled in villages.

In 1968 American anthropologist Johan Reinhard located a few of the last surviving Kusunda near Gorkha in Central Nepal, and in 1969 and 1975 he found further members in Dang and Surkhet valleys in Western Nepal, collecting basic linguistic and ethnographic data (see references below). Shortly earlier, in about 1956, René de Nebesky-Wojkowitz wrote a report after he was told by villagers of Kusundas conducting silent trade with Nepali farmers. The Kusunda were said to have brought a deer hunted recently and left it for a farm household with the unspoken expectation that the farmers would give the Kusunda farm goods.

The Kusunda mainly hunted birds resting in trees at night with bows and exceptionally long (ca. 160 cm) unfeathered arrows, which were poorly suited for the hunting of land animals. Their custom of eating only the meat of wild animals extended until recent times. The Kusunda are followers of animism, though Hindu overtones may be seen in their religious rituals. According to the 2021 Nepal census, there are a total of 253 ethnic Kusunda. In 2001 Census, there were 164 Kusunda of whom 160 were Hindus and 4 were Buddhists. The Nepali word Kusunda originally meant "savage", as the neighboring Chepang and other groups traditionally thought of them as savages.

== Kusunda language ==
Gyani Maiya Sen-Kusunda showing body parts and pronouncing their respective names in the Kusunda language

Watters (2005) published a mid-sized grammatical description of the Kusunda language, plus vocabulary, which shows that Kusunda is indeed a language isolate. Nepali is now their language of everyday communication. The language is moribund, with no children learning it, as all Kusunda speakers have married outside their ethnicity. Only one speaker survives in Nepal, an elderly woman.
