= Nandha (disambiguation) =

Nandha may refer to:

== People ==
- Nandha Periyasamy, Indian film director
- Deva Nandha, Indian child actress
- Gowri Nandha, Indian actress

== Other uses ==
- Nandha Engineering College, in Tamil Nadu, India

== See also ==
- Nanda (disambiguation)
- Nandaa, Indian actor
- Nandha En Nila, a 1977 Indian film
- Nandhaa, a 2001 Indian Tamil-language action drama film by Bala
