= SmartGaon =

Indian non-governmental organization

SmartGaon Development Foundation
- SmartGaon
- Formation: 2017
- Founders: Rajnish Bajpai; Yogesh Sahu
- Founded at: Mumbai, Maharashtra
- Type: Non-governmental organization
- Legal status: Active
- Purpose: Rural infrastructure development
- Headquarters: Mumbai
- Region served: India (Nationwide)
- Products: SmartGaon app
- Services: Digitization and development of rural areas of India
- Official language: Hindi/English
- Website: smartgaon.org

SmartGaon Development Foundation, commonly known as SmartGaon, is an Indian non-governmental organization, currently headquartered in Mumbai, India. The organization was founded by Rajnish Bajpai and Yogesh Sahu in 2017. SmartGaon undertakes digitization and development of rural infrastructure of India. The organization's initiatives also include comprehensive development of education in villages of India including farmer empowerment. SmartGaon's objectives have been acknowledged by Prime Minister of India, Narendra Modi during his nationwide public addressal program, Mann Ki Baat. The organization is in strategic support with Government of India's initiatives including Digital India, Swachh Bharat Mission, Make in India and Ministry of Environment, Forest and Climate Change.

== History and objective ==
SmartGaon was founded in 2017, by Rajnish Bajpai, a software professional based in United States, and Yogesh Sahu, a Mumbai-based entrepreneur, with the main undertaking of improving quality of life in rural settlements of India. The organization also focuses on raising awareness about policies and scheme initiated by government to rural population of India. SmartGaon Development Foundation's major objectives are to assist villages in setting up sustainable digital infrastructure by providing urban amenities, advance agricultural equipments, digitization of rural area and setting up of virtual marketplace to procure better prices of crops to farmers. SmartGaon's etymology is derived from two words, SMART, an acronym for Social Security Schemes, Modern Urban Facilities, Adopting Smart Agricultural Practices Road, Infrastructure, and Transportation Facilities and Tech Savvy, and Gaon meaning village in Hindi.

In mid-2018, SmartGaon Development Foundation completed their first project in Taudhakpur, a remote village in Raebareli, by installing digitized public address systems, smart farming practices, mobile app facility in the form of SmartGaon App for global connectivity and other modern amenities. Taudhakpur has been deemed as the first "SmartGaon" (Smart village) of India. SmartGaon's other projects include Machandur in Durg district and Chinchani in Palghar district.

=== SmartGaon app ===
SmartGaon app is the flagship mobile application of SmartGaon Development Foundation. The app is developed by Rajnish Bajpai and Yogesh Sahu in late 2017. SmartGaon app allows connectivity of remote villages to urban world. The users are allowed to obtain all information related to the government's scheme and policies through the app. SmartGaon app monitors and updates all the initiatives undertaken by SmartGaon Development Foundation for the development of the villages. Gram Mart, another feature of SmartGaon app, is an online marketplace that permits villagers to buy and sell farm produce directly in the market, supporting fair trade between farmers. In July 2018, Prime Minister of India, Narendra Modi cited SmartGaon app's impact in rural development in his Mann Ki Baat radio address. Arun Singh, the current National General Secretary of Bharatiya Janata Party also regarded SmartGaon's influence on rural society of India to be positive.

=== Programs ===
- Digital Infrastructure Development - Digitization of villages by setting up Wi-Fi zones, computer lab, villagers addressing system, SmartGaon Mobile App and village website.
- Smart Village School Development - Development of education system in schools of villages by providing digital education facilities and other modern educational types of equipment.
- Community Infrastructure Development - Setting up public library, gym and yoga centers in villages with modern equipments.
- Smart Skills Development for Farmers - Educating farmers about Government's scheme and modern agricultural techniques along with smart training by agricultural scientists.
