= Nanda =

Nanda may refer to:

== Places ==
- Nanda Empire, occupying what is now northeastern India in the 4th century BCE
- Nanda, Maharashtra, a town in India

== People ==
- Mahapadma Nanda, first emperor of the Nanda Empire
- Dhana Nanda (died c. 321 BCE), last ruler of the Nanda dynasty
- Nanda (Buddhist nun), half-sister of Siddhartha Gautama, who became Gautama Buddha
- Nanda (half-brother of Buddha) or Sundarananda
- Nanda Bayin (1535–1600), King of Burma
- Nanda (actress) (1939–2014), Indian film actress
- Nanda (surname), an Indian surname
- Nanda people, an Aboriginal people of Western Australia

== Other uses ==
- Nanda (Hinduism), a character in Hindu mythology, foster-father of the deity Krishna
- Nanda (film), a 2009 Indian Kannada film
- NANDA International, formerly the North American Nursing Diagnosis Association

== See also ==
- Nanda ministry (disambiguation)
- Nandha (disambiguation)
- Nandhaa, a 2001 Indian Tamil film
