= Mahananda =

Mahananda may refer to:

Places:

- Mahananda River, a tributary of the Ganges in India
- Mahananda Wildlife Sanctuary, a protected wildlife sanctuary in West Bengal, India

Films:

- Sati Mahananda, a 1933 Indian Hindi-language film
- Mahananda (1939 film), a 1939 Indian Telugu-language film directed by China Kameswara Rao Dronamraju
- Mahananda (1984 film), a 1984 Indian Marathi-language film
- Mahananda (2001 film), a 2001 Indian Bengali-language film by Madhuchhanda Sengupta
- Mahananda (film), a 2022 Indian Bengali-language film directed by Arindam Sil

Other uses:

- Mahananda (company), a state-backed cooperative that is the largest supplier of milk in the Indian state of Maharashtra
- Mahananda Dasgupta, an Indian-Australian physicist
- Mahananda Poudyal (1931–2017), an Indian writer
- Mahananda Sapkota, a Nepalese social worker
- Sikkim Mahananda Express, a train which runs between New Delhi and Alipurduar, in India

== See also ==
- Maha (disambiguation)
- Nanda (disambiguation)
- Mahanandi, a village in Andhra Pradesh, India
- Mahanandi (film), a 2005 Indian film
- P. K. Mahanandia, an Indian artist
- Maha Nand Singh, an Indian politician
- Mahanandin, a king of the Shaishunaga dynasty of Magadha in ancient India from c. 355 to 345 BC
- Mahapadma Nanda, emperor of the Nanda Empire in India in the 4th-century BC
