= Gadchandur =

- City
- Nickname: Gadchandur
- Location in Maharashtra, India
- Coordinates: 19°43′N 79°10′E
- Country: India
- State: Maharashtra
- District: Chandrapur

Population
  - Total: 60,000 estimated

Hindi, Marathi, Gondi, maratha
  - Marathi: Marathi
- Time zone: UTC+5:43 (local)
- Postal code: 442908
- Vehicle registration: MH 34

Gadchandur is a city and Municipal Council in Korpana Tashil Chandrapur district, Maharashtra, India. Gadchandur is named after the fort Chandur.

== Transport ==
Daily buses operates between Bela, Adilabad district to Gadchandur and chandrapur. Gadchandur has road transport including State Transport (ST) and private bus transport facility direct to Nagpur. Gadchandur also has railway station but presently only goods train are operating.

== Schools in Gadchandur ==
- DPS Gadchandur
- KIDZEE Gadchandur
- ABPS Gadchandur
- MGV Gadchandur
- SFV Gadchandur

== Nearby towns and cities ==
- Bibi (4.0km)
- Nanda (7 km)
- Jiwati (20km)
- Rajura (21.0 km)
- Korpana (20.0 km)
- Ghugus (30.0 km)
- Ballarpur (31.0 km)
