= Dhemsa =

Indian folk dance

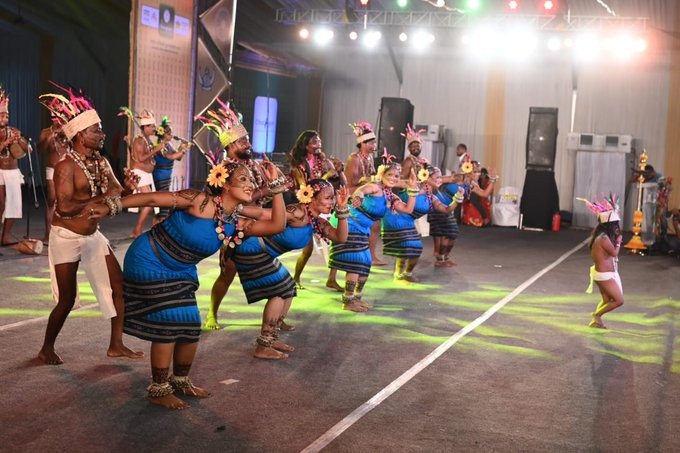
Dhemsa dance

Dhemsa is a traditional folk dance of tribal people of southern Odisha, Chhattisgarh, and Andhra Pradesh in southern India. Dhemsa is performed in groups. The dancers hold each other by the shoulder and waist, then dance to the rhythm of traditional instruments. Traditional folk instruments that are used in this dance are dhol, tamak', changu, and mahuri. The dance is generally performed late at night by the tribes called "Desia" or "Adivasis" in the annual ceremonies of Chait Parab and Pus Puni or some would call Pus Parab. The person playing mohuri is called Mohuria; the drummers follow.

== Origin ==
This dance form is present in Maharashtra state, Vidarbha. Kosodum Welfare Private Limited is an ad hoc observer for the Intergovernmental Committee on Intellectual Property and Genetic Resources, Traditional Knowledge, and Folklore at WIPO has organized the Dhemsa and Rela event in Mumbai to promote the ancient dance form in the metro This initiative involved exceptional cooperation among Kosodum Welfare Private Limited, Gondwana Jangom Dhemsa Rela Nrutya Dal, and Gondwana MitraMandal, Mumbai. The project organized a performance of Gond Tribe artists in Mumbai, promoting tribal dance forms and raising awareness in metropolitan areas. The collaboration showcases effective inter-organizational efforts in the preservation and promotion of tribal arts.
