= Rajura =

- Town
- Location in Maharashtra, India
- Country: India
- State: Maharashtra
- District: Chandrapur
- Elevation: 181 m (594 ft)

Population
  - Total: 25,842

Languages
  - Official: Marathi
- Time zone: UTC+5:30 (IST)
- PIN: 442905
- Vehicle registration: MH 34

Rajura is a town and municipal council district of the Indian state of Maharashtra.

== Geography ==
Rajura is at 19.7775°N 79.3663°E in Maharashtra, on the banks of the Wardha River in central India's coal belt. The town has an average elevation of 189 metres (624 feet).

== Demographics ==
According to the 2021 Indian census, Rajura had a population of 25,842 Literate people are 18,724 out of 10,460 are male and 8,264 are female. Children under age six constitute about 15 percent of the population. Rajura's average literacy rate of 72 percent (77 percent of males, 67 percent of females) exceeds the national average of 59.5 percent. Nearby towns include Ballarpur, Gadchandur, Nanda and Korpana.

| Year | Male | Female | Total Population | Change | Religion (%) | | | | | | | |
| Year | Male | Female | Total Population | Change | Hindu | Muslim | Christian | Sikhs | Buddhist | Jain | Other religions and persuasions | Religion not stated |
|---|---|---|---|---|---|---|---|---|---|---|---|---|
| 2001 | 13539 | 12304 | 25843 | - | 73.443 | 14.553 | 0.747 | 0.468 | 10.305 | 0.213 | 0.155 | 0.116 |
| 2011 | 15337 | 14331 | 29668 | 0.148 | 72.799 | 14.632 | 0.556 | 0.425 | 11.184 | 0.202 | 0.155 | 0.047 |
| 2021 | 13538 | 12304 | 25842 | | | | | | | | | |

View chart definition.
View chart definition.

== Industries ==
Rajura is in the heart of Maharashtra's coal and cement-producing areas. Due to the availability of raw materials, there are a number of cement factories near the town.

== Places of interest ==
A number of temples are in and near Rajura. They include the Hanuman temple near the lake in Jogapur, about 10 km (6.2 mi) from Rajura, and the Shri Saibaba temple (Chota Shirdi) on the Wardha River. The Somnath Mandir temple is in Somanathapur region. Shri Sankat Mochan Hanuman Temple near Nagar Parishad Rajura

== See also ==
- List of talukas in Chandrapur district
- List of village in Rajura taluka
