= Language Commission (Nepal) =

Constitutional body in Nepal

- भाषा आयोग

Agency overview
- Formed: September 9, 2016
- Headquarters: Yentabun, Shankhamul, Kathmandu
- Agency executive: Dr. Gopal Thakur, Chairman
- Website: https://languagecommission.gov.np

Nepalese Languages Commission (भाषा आयोग) is a constitutional commission for protection and promotion of native languages of Nepal. Nepal's Constitution (Article 7,1) designates Nepali in Devanagari as the official language for government work. The Commission notes government offices neglect this, proposing laws for mother tongue education (up to 3rd grade) to uphold constitutional rights (Article 31,5).

== Constitution ==
The Language Commission is provisioned in Clause 287 of the Constitution of Nepal. According to its sub-clause 6, the following are the rights and duties of the commission.

- "(6) The functions, duties and powers of the Language Commission shall be as follows:
- "(a) to determine the criteria to be fulfilled for the recognition of the official language and make recommendations on languages to the Government of Nepal,
- "(b) to make recommendations to the Government of Nepal, on the measures to be adopted for the protection, promotion and development of languages,
- "(c) to measure the levels of development of mother tongues and make suggestions to the Government of Nepal, on the potentiality of their use in education,
- "(d) to study, research and monitor languages."
