= Korpana =

- city
- Location in Maharashtra, India
- Coordinates: 19°44′27″N 78°59′21″E
- Country: India
- State: Maharashtra
- District: chandrapur

Government
  - Body: Municipal Council

Population
  - Total: 10,000 estimated

Languages
  - Official: Marathi
- Time zone: UTC+5:30 (IST)
- PIN: 442 916
- Vehicle registration: MH 34

Korpana is a City (Town Panchayat) and a tehsil in Rajura subdivision of Chandrapur district in Nagpur revenue Division in the Vidarbha region in the state of Maharashtra, India. This is Last Tehsil Place In Chandrapur District. The Telangana border and Yavatmal district. Also this taluka is leading in cement production in Maharashtra. It has 4 big cement factories in the country and 1 coal mine.The taluka covers a total of 113 villages.

== संदर्भ ==
१. चंद्रपूर जिल्हा जनगणना हस्तपुस्तिका २०११ (District Census Handbook 2011). २. "Korpana Taluka Profile", Chandrapur District Official Website, chandrapur.gov.in. ३. महाराष्ट्र राज्य गॅझेटियर - चंद्रपूर जिल्हा (सुधारित आवृत्ती). ४. "List of Ginning and Pressing Units in Chandrapur", MSME Development Institute. ५. स्थानिक वृत्तपत्रे (लोकमत/सकाळ/पुण्यनगरी) - हरबाजी पाटील राजूरकर यांच्या योगदानाबाबतचे विशेष लेख.
