= Kondekor language =

Central Dravidian language spoken in India

Kondekor
- Gadaba, San Gadaba, Gadba, Sano, Kondekar, Kondkor, Konḍekor Gadaba, Mudhili Gadaba
- కొండెకొర్
- Native to: India
- Native speakers: 8,000 Kondekor (2002; 2000)
- Language family: Dravidian: Central Dravidian; Parji–Gadaba; Kondekor
- Writing system: Telugu script

Language codes
- ISO 639-3: gau
- Glottolog: mudh1235 Mudhili Gadaba
- ELP: Mudhili Gadaba
- Mudhili Gadaba

The Kondekor language (IPA: [koɳɖekoːr] (also known as Gadaba, San Gadaba, Gadba, Sano, Kondekar, Kondkor, Konḍekor Gadaba, Mudhili Gadaba) is a Central Dravidian language. A closely related variety is Ollari (also known as Pottangi Ollar Gadaba, Ollar Gadaba, Ollaro, Hallari, Allar, Hollar Gadbas). The two have been treated either as dialects, or as separate languages. They are spoken in and around Pottangi, Koraput district, Odisha and in Srikakulam District, Andhra Pradesh, India.

== Phonology ==
Vowels
	Front		Central		Back	
	short	long	short	long	short	long
High	i	iː			u	uː
Mid	e	eː			o	oː
Low			a	aː		

- There are some nasalized vowels with rare occurrence.

Consonants
		Labial	Dental/ Alveolar	Retroflex	Palatal	Velar
Nasal		m	n̪	ɳ		ŋ
Plosive/ Affricate	voiceless	p	t̪	ʈ	t͡ʃ	k
Plosive/ Affricate	voiced	b	d̪	ɖ	d͡ʒ	ɡ
Fricative	voiceless		s			
Fricative	voiced					
Approximant		ʋ	l		j	
Rhotic			r			

== Sources ==
- Krishnamurti, B. (2003), The Dravidian Languages, Cambridge University Press, ISBN 978-1-139-43533-8 ISBN 0-521-77111-0
