= Korku people =

Scheduled tribe (ST) community of Madhya Pradesh, India

Korku
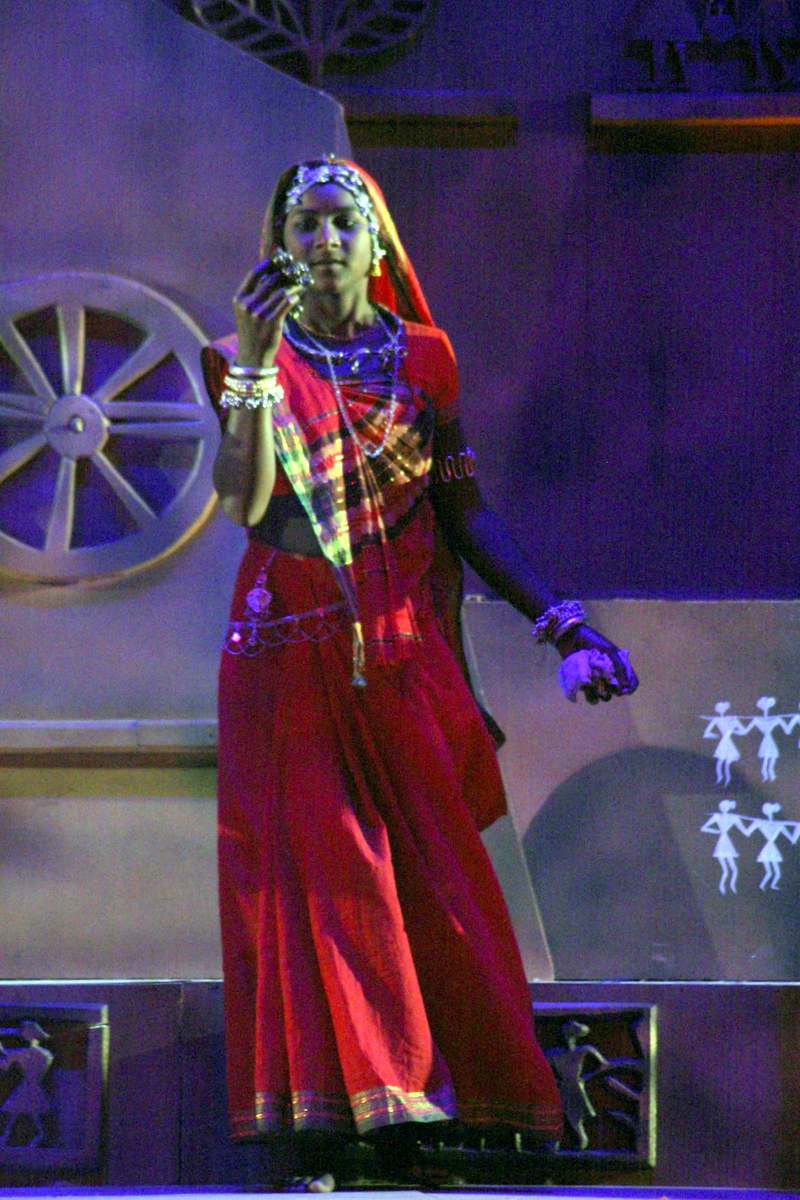
- A Korku tribal girl performing dance in traditional attire.

Total population
- 1,104,519 (2011 census)

Regions with significant populations
- India
- Madhya Pradesh: 840,027
- Maharastra: 264,492

Languages
- Korku • Hindi • Marathi

Religion
- Hinduism

Related ethnic groups
- Munda peoples

The Korku are a Munda ethnic group predominantly found in the Khandwa, Burhanpur, Betul and Chhindwara districts of Madhya Pradesh and adjoining areas near the Melghat Tiger Reserve of Maharashtra. They speak the Korku language, which is a member of the Munda languages and is written using Devanagari. They are classified as a Scheduled Tribe by the Indian government.

== Etymology ==
The name ‘Korku’ is originated from two terms ‘Koro’ and ‘Ku’ whereas ‘Koro’ means person and ‘Ku’ means alive. In combination, the two words ‘Koro and Ku’ can be defined as the alive member. The Korkus are a Munda tribe and live near a Dravidian-speaking tribe — the Gonds. The Korku people are believed to have been initially a hunter-gatherer community who dwelt in the forests of the Satpura Range on both sides of the Tapti River.

== Dwelling ==
The Korku tribe lives in small groups of huts made of grass and wood. Every household has an elevated stage-like structure at the front side of the house. This elevated stage is used as a storage space for farm produce such as cattle feed. They consume liquor made from the flowers of the Mahua tree which is prepared in almost all the houses. Predominantly, a rural-based community with 97% living in rural areas, Korkus are primarily cultivators.

Whilst they share the love of the forests with the Gonds, they are also agriculturists and Korkus in Bhainsdehi tahsil of the Betul district of Madhya Pradesh cultivate of potato and coffee. The Korkus practice seasonal farming: they cultivate gram, jowar, pulses, millet, and wheat during the dry season, and then switch to rice, maize, and soybeans during the monsoon season. In their traditional festivals of Hari and Jitori, they celebrate a month-long planting campaign. In this way they combat malnutrition and environmental degradation.

The community is home to a unique and distinct culture, and possesses a rich heritage of age old traditional systems of knowledge, belief, customs and social system. The traditional representative body of the society, known as ‘Korku Panchayat’, is found in many villages. Headed by a chief known as Patel, other members of the Panchayat include Padihar (priest), Kotwar (Chaukidar) and ten to twelve older male members of the community known as Panch. It plays a decisive role during traditional occasions such as festivals, marriages and intra- and inter-village conflict resolution. Known for poverty, hunger, malnutrition, mass-scale exploitation by moneylenders and traders, the community confronts numerous socio-economic challenges in its day-to-day life partly due to the poor natural resource bases. Although agriculture is the primary source of livelihoods for most community members, many of them earn their livelihoods seasonally employed as agricultural labourers.

== Social organization ==
The Korku are divided into four subsects: Bawaria, Roma Thakur, Bondoya and Mawasi. The Mawasi subsect is considered to be the largest subsect. The Bawaria are mainly concentrated in Betul district, the Bondoya in the hills of Jitgarh and Panchmarhi, and the Ruma in Amravati district. In Melghat, there is no Bondoya subsect but instead a Goyara. The Goyaras are looked down upon by the other subsects for eating beef, which the others do not do. However this seems to be a recent innovation based on outside influence, and was not reported in the work of early scholars.

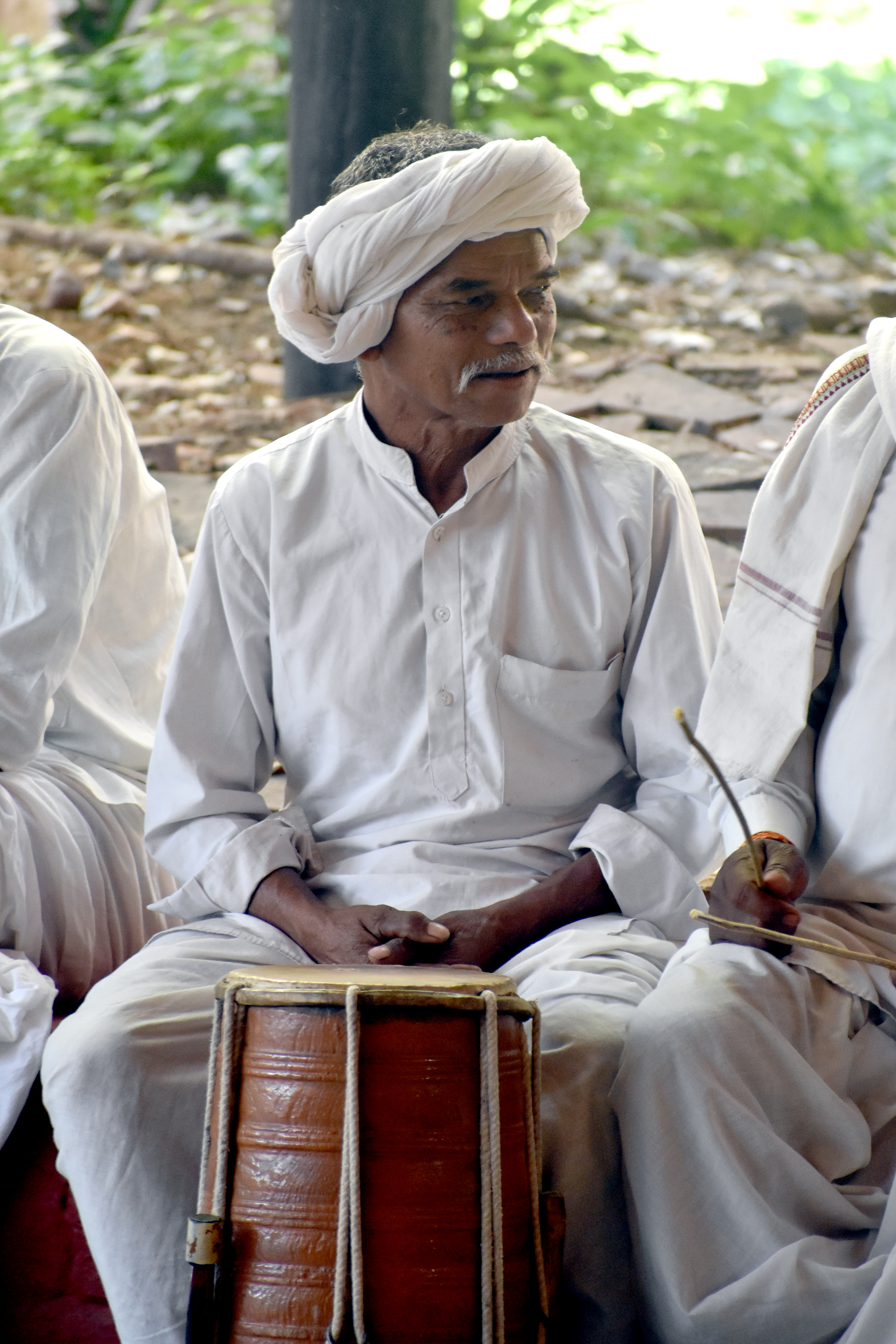
Dhandal dancer of the Korku tribe from Chhattisgarh, India

The Korkus have a set of gotras, which they believe was created when Shiva took the form of a lion and scared the original Korkus into a forest. According to legend, Shiva then declared that whatever object the Korku hid under would be his clan name, and he also ordered them to marry outside the gotra only. There are 16 clans in the Melghat region, although in other regions scholars have reported different numbers:

- Bethe (bilwa tree)
- Jambhu (jamun tree)
- Bhusum (grass)
- Kasda (soil)
- Mawasi (water)
- Dhikar (tree)
- Selu (tree)
- Chilhati (A creeper: scientific name Caesalpina separia)
- Korilua (tree)
- Sakom (leaf)
- Tota (maize)
- Chathwa (wooden ladle)
- Mara (peacock)

Gotras found in the same area geographically such as Jambhu and Dhikar trees are considered brother-sister and marriage between the two was once not allowed. These taboos are largely gone and only same-gotra marriages are forbidden. Some scholars found a 'Thakur' gotra in some places, which may stem from certain bands of Korku with Rajput chieftains collecting tribute from lowlands of Vidarbha, called 'tankha Mawasi'. The Mawasis claim the highest status among Korkus and formerly practiced raiding. There is also a group of Raj Korkus, who claim high status which is accepted by outside communities like the Brahmins.

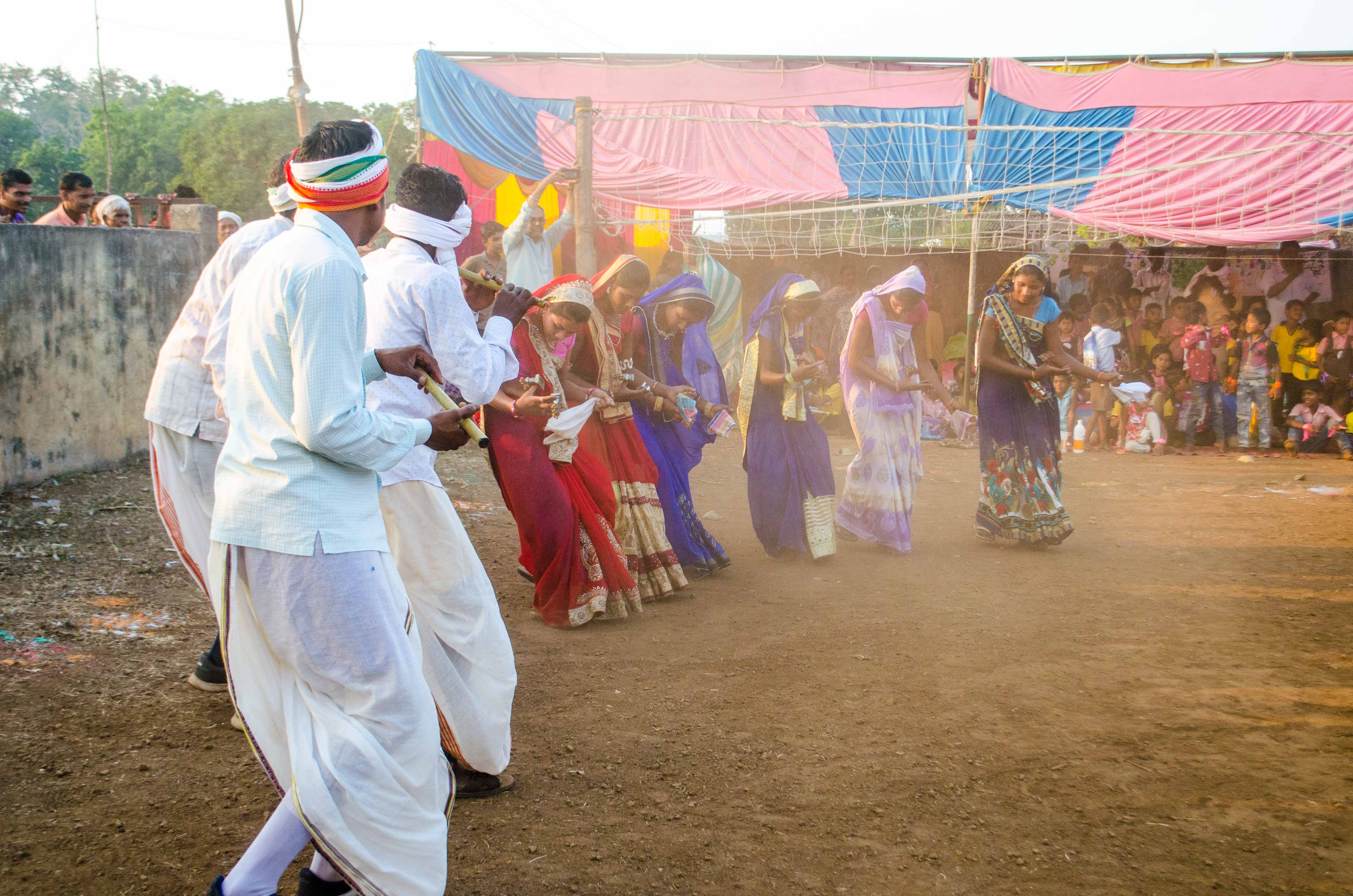
Korku Folk Dance in village near Hatru

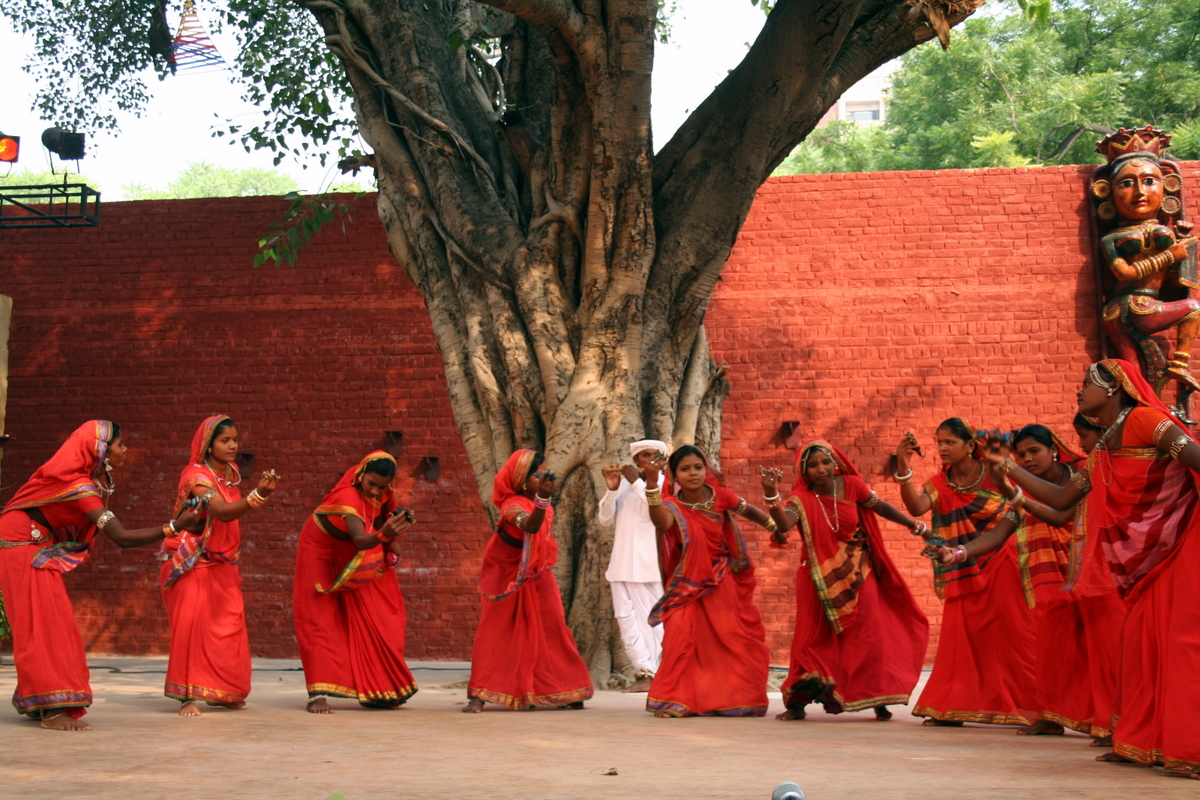
Korku Dance, Madhya Pradesh

== See also ==
- Munda peoples
