= David E. Watters =

American educator

David E. Watters (1944 – 18 May 2009) was an American educator who specialized in Tibeto-Burman languages and folklore.

== Education ==
Watters was born in 1944, and was originally from Daggett, California. He later lived in Port Angeles, Washington. He received a Diploma from Prairie Bible Institute, Canada (1967), an MA degree from the University of Oregon (1996), and a PhD degree also from UO (1998).

== Career ==
Watters' university career began as an adjunct faculty member at the University of Oregon, in Eugene. He was also a visiting scholar at Tribhuvan University in Kathmandu, Nepal, from 2001 to 2006.

Watters was the Director of the Oregon Summer Institute of Linguistics for four years, and was a member of SIL International. Watters was considered an expert within his field, especially the Kham language, and was widely published and cited. Amongst other research in 2007 at the Research Centre for Linguistic Typology at La Trobe University in Australia, he was working on the grammar of Kaike language, comparative study of Kiranti languages, and Himalayan languages in general, as well as a previously undescribed Tibeto-Burman language.

== Death ==
Watters died on May 18, 2009, of a heart attack. He had recently overcome bladder cancer when a blood clot formed in his leg after an operation, and it traveled to his heart. He was survived by his wife, Nancy, and two sons, Stephen and Daniel who are also researching Tibeto-Burman languages. Watters had almost completed an autobiography when he died.

== Awards ==
- University of Oregon, Doctoral Research Fellowship – 1997
