= Smart Village India =

The Smart Village concept, adopted by national, state and local governments of India, is an initiative focused on holistic rural development. It draws inspiration from Mahatma Gandhi's vision of Adarsh Gram (Ideal Village) and Swaraj (Self Reliance). Prime Minister Narendra Modi launched the Sansad Adarsh Gram Yojana (SAGY) - also known as SAANJHI - on 2 October 2014, Gandhi's birthday. Introduced alongside Smart Cities and Digital India, SAGY serves as a key rural development programme for India. The Parliamentarian's Model Village Scheme's main goal is for each Member of Parliament and Minister to adopt a rural village and develop it into a model by 2019 under the SAGY guidelines. The vision of SAGY is an integrated village development plan, encompassing Personal, Human, Social, and Economic dimensions.

== Background ==
Smart Village India is founded on Mahatma Gandhi's vision of Adarsh Gram (model village) and Gram Swaraj (Village self-rule/independence). In two texts, Hind Swaraj and Gram (Village) Swaraj, Gandhi promotes the concept of integrated rural development to impact majority of the population, as the primary initiative after India Independence in 1947. Prof. Priyan and Agale Founder of Eco Needs Foundation and Dr. Satyapal Sing Meena (IRS) Joint commissioner of Income Tax own the Smart Village concept.

The Eco Needs Foundation initiated the Smart Village project by adopting villages and working toward sustainable development by providing basic amenities like sanitation, safe drinking water, and internal roads. The Foundation is also working towards inculcating moral values in society and improving the standard of living for villagers. The development of the village is based on five paths: Retrofitting, Redevelopment, Green fields, e-Pan, Livelihood.

The Foundation has adopted Village Dhanora (Teh. Bari, District Dholpur), a small and remote village of Rajasthan, to develop it as India's first Smart Village. The village is situated 30 km away from Dholpur district headquarters and 248 km from Jaipur. The population of the village is about 2,000. The village was devoid of basic necessities like sanitation and internal roads. It was also facing various other problems such as lack of access to potable water, non-availability of water conservation system, encroachment on the roads, power fluctuation, non-availability of employment oriented education, unemployment and poverty.

Smart Village Dhanora has become role model of rural development. Dhanora was also given an award by Prime minister of India Mr. Narendra Modi in the year 2018.

== Implementation by states ==
The following states and territories participate in the programme:

- Andaman and Nicobar Islands
- Andhra Pradesh
- Arunachal Pradesh
- Assam
- Bihar
- Chandigarh
- Chhattisgarh
- Dadra and Nagar Haveli
- Daman and Diu
- Delhi
- Gujarat
- Haryana
- Himachal Pradesh
- Jammu and Kashmir
- Jharkhand
- Karnataka
- Kerala
- Lakshadweep
- Madhya Pradesh
- Maharashtra
- Manipur
- Meghalaya
- Mizoram
- Nagaland
- Nominated
- Odisha
- Puducherry
- Punjab
- Rajasthan
- Sikkim
- Tamil Nadu
- Telangana
- Tripura
- Uttar Pradesh
- Uttarakhand
- West Bengal
