= Ollari language =

Central Dravidian language spoken in India

Ollari
- Pottangi Ollar Gadaba, Ollar Gadaba, Ollaro, Hallari, Allar, Hollar Gadbas
- ఒల్లరి
- Native to: India
- Native speakers: 15,000 Ollari (2002; 2000)
- Language family: Dravidian: Central Dravidian; Parji–Gadaba; Ollari
- Writing system: Telugu script

Language codes
- ISO 639-3: gdb
- Glottolog: pott1240 Pottangi Ollar Gadaba
- ELP: Pottangi Ollar Gadaba

The Ollari language (IPA: [olːɐri], also known as Pottangi Ollar Gadaba, Ollar Gadaba, Ollaro, Hallari, Allar, Hollar Gadbas) is a Central Dravidian language. A closely related variety is Kondekor (also known as Gadaba, San Gadaba, Gadba, Sano, Kondekar, Kondkor, Konḍekor Gadaba, Mudhili Gadaba). The two have been treated either as dialects, or as separate languages. They are spoken in and around Pottangi, Koraput district, Odisha and in Srikakulam District, Andhra Pradesh, India.

Sathupati Prasanna Sree has developed a unique script for use with the language.

== Phonology ==
Vowels
	Front		Central		Back	
	short	long	short	long	short	long
High	i	iː			u	uː
Mid	e	eː			o	oː
Low			a	aː		

- There are some nasalized vowels with rare occurrence.

Consonants
		Labial	Dental/ Alveolar	Retroflex	Palatal	Velar
Nasal		m	n̪		(ɲ)	ŋ
Plosive	voiceless	p	t̪	ʈ		k
Plosive	voiced	b	d̪	ɖ		ɡ
Affricate	voiceless		t͡s		t͡ʃ	
Affricate	voiced		d͡z		d͡ʒ	
Fricative	voiceless		s			
Fricative	voiced		z			
Approximant	median	ʋ			j	
Approximant	lateral		l			
Rhotic			r, ɾ			

== Sources ==
- Krishnamurti, B. (2003), The Dravidian Languages, Cambridge University Press, ISBN 978-1-139-43533-8 ISBN 0-521-77111-0
