= Children of Llullaillaco =

3 Inca ice mummies discovered in Peru

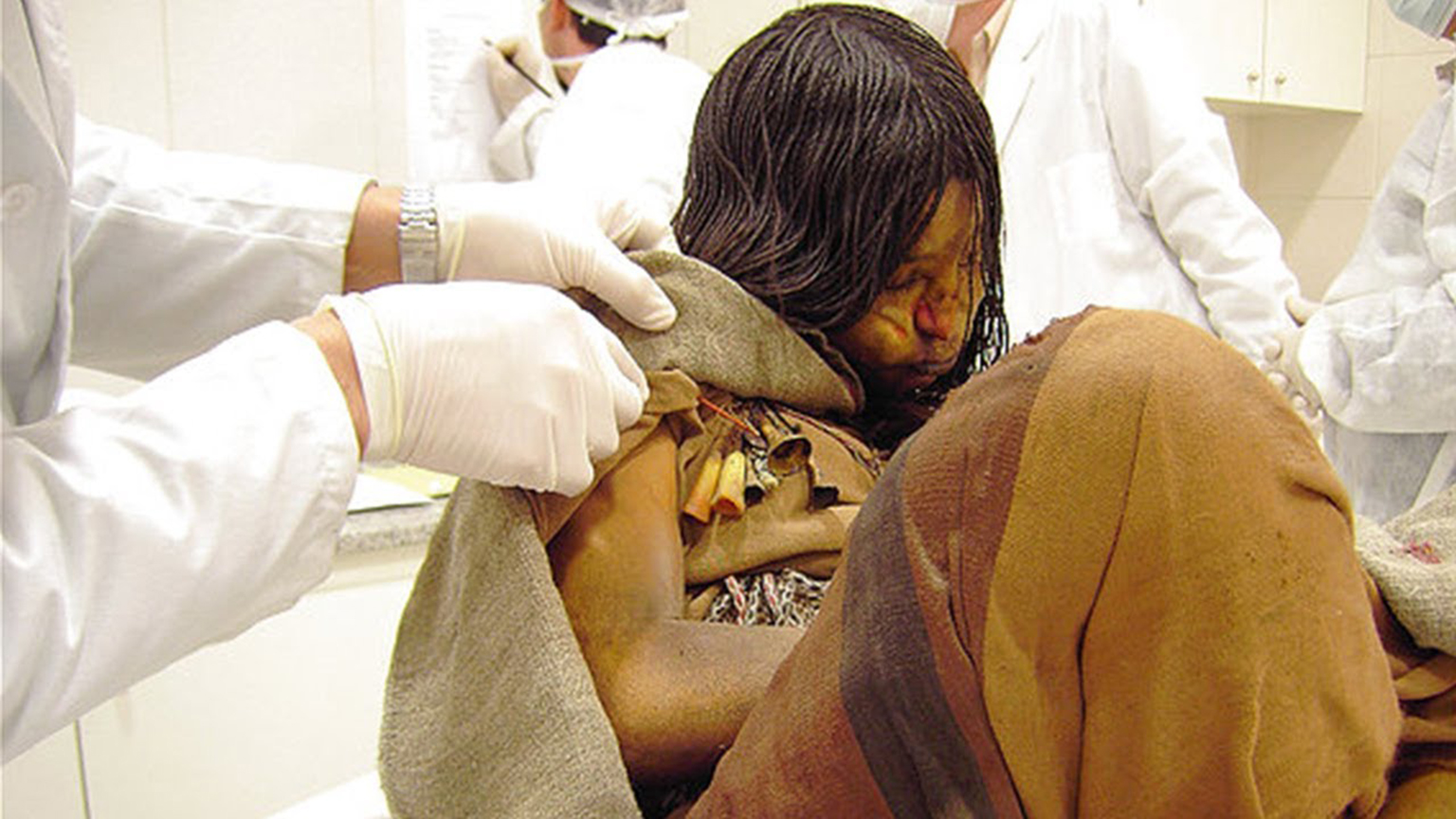
- La Doncella, the oldest of the three children
- Died: c. 1500; Near the summit of Llullaillaco, on the modern Argentina–Chile border
- Cause of death: Human sacrifice during a capacocha ceremony
- Body discovered: 16 March 1999 by Johan Reinhard, María Constanza Ceruti and their archaeological team
- Resting place: Museum of High Altitude Archaeology, Salta, Argentina
- Other name: Mummies of Llullaillaco
- Known for: Three exceptionally preserved Inca child mummies

The Children of Llullaillaco (Note: "Las tres momias denominadas "Los Niños del Llullaillaco"" (in Spanish). Comisión Nacional de Monumentos, de Lugares y de Bienes Históricos. 2 December 2013. Archived from the original on 3 December 2013.) (Spanish: [(ɟ)ʝuʝajˈʝako] or [ʎuʎajˈʎako]), also known as the Mummies of Llullaillaco (Spanish: Momias de Llullaillaco), are three exceptionally well-preserved Inca child mummies discovered on 16 March 1999 by archaeologists Johan Reinhard, María Constanza Ceruti and their team near the summit of Llullaillaco, a 6,739 m (22,110 ft) stratovolcano on the modern Argentina–Chile border. The children died between 1462 and 1507 CE as part of a capacocha ceremony, a form of Inca ritual sacrifice, and were buried at an elevation of approximately 6,700 m (22,000 ft), one of the highest archaeological sites in the world.

The cold, arid conditions on Llullaillaco preserved the children's soft tissues, internal organs, hair and clothing in exceptional condition, making them among the best-preserved Inca mummies ever discovered. Scientific analyses have provided evidence for the children's ritual preparation before their deaths, including increased consumption of coca and chicha, a maize beer, during the final months of their lives.

On 20 June 2001, Argentina's National Commission of Museums, Monuments and Historic Places declared the Children of Llullaillaco National Historic Property. Since 2007 they have been exhibited at the Museum of High Altitude Archaeology in Salta, Argentina.

== Discovery ==
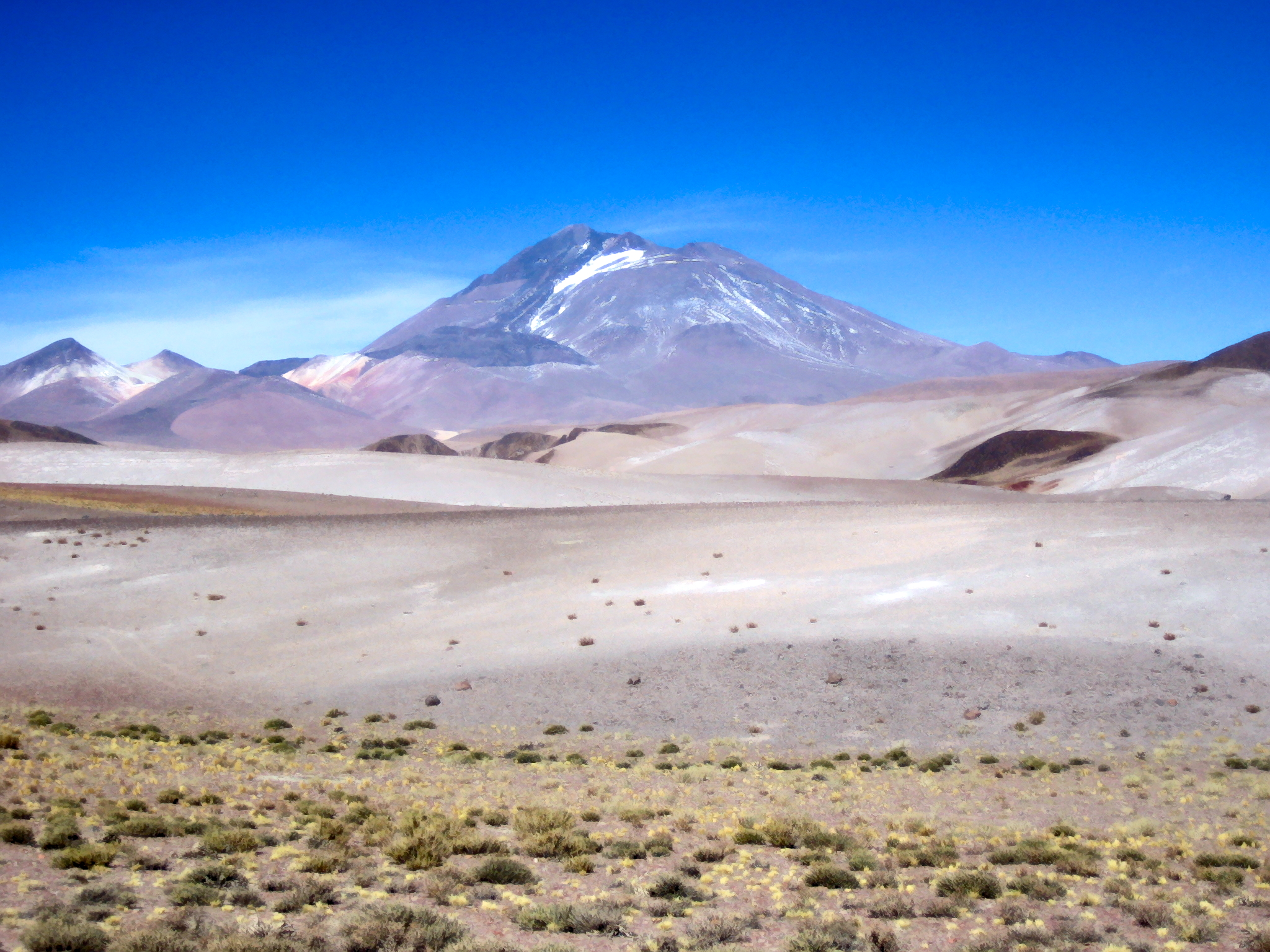
A view of Llullaillaco

The Children of Llullaillaco were discovered on 16 March 1999 near the summit of Llullaillaco, a 6,739 m (22,110 ft) stratovolcano in the Andes Mountains on the modern border between Argentina and Chile. Their burial site, at an elevation of approximately 6,700 m (22,000 ft), has been described as the highest archaeological site in the world.

The discovery was made by archaeologists Johan Reinhard and María Constanza Ceruti during an expedition to the mountain. The children's burial had been covered by approximately 1.5 m (4.9 ft) of earth and rock. Alongside the children were a large collection of grave goods, including gold, silver and shell figurines, finely woven textiles and pottery.

The discovery followed several weeks of work at high altitude. After acclimatizing and establishing a series of camps on the mountain, the team reached an elevation of approximately 6,600 m (21,700 ft). There they faced winds exceeding 110 km/h (68 mph), temperatures as low as -40, and a storm that lasted four days.

According to Reinhard, the team was preparing to abandon the search when researchers noticed an artificial layer beneath the surface. Following this evidence led them to the burial chamber and the discovery of the children.

== Final days and cause of death ==
The Children of Llullaillaco died as part of a capacocha (qhapaq hucha) ceremony, a form of ritual sacrifice practiced in the Inca Empire. Children selected for these ceremonies were often chosen, or volunteered, based on their beauty and physical perfection, from elite families and taken from their home communities for ritual preparation before being brought to shrines on high mountain summits. The practice of ritual sacrifice in Inca society was intended to ensure health, rich harvests and favorable weather. In this ceremonial practice, human bodies were offered to the mountains, or apus, which were considered sacred places, powerful ancestors, and Huacas (sacred beings). The sacrificed children were not merely offerings, but were believed to actually enter the spirit world of the apus, becoming divine intermediaries between their communities of the gods.

These capacocha ceremonies were once thought to be linked to the initial phase of imperial Inca expansion, but La Doncella postdates the incorporation of the region into the Inca Empire. This indicates that the sacrificial practices at Llullaillaco were not directly associated with initial conquest or asserting territorial dominance. Study of paleoclimatic volcanism and climatological reconstructions indicate that no large-scale natural disasters would have prompted the ritual. The most likely cause of the Llullaillaco capacocha is an expression of the sustained ideological and ritual efforts to maintain cohesion within the far-reaching and diverse Inca empire, or, although less likely, a highly localized environmental anomaly, such as a drought.

Scientific analyses indicate that the three children underwent months of ritual preparation before their deaths. Hair analysis showed increasing consumption of coca and chicha, a maize beer, during the final months of their lives. The pattern was most pronounced in La Doncella, who consumed substantially greater quantities than the other two children in the year before her death, with particular spikes of coca at 12 months and 6 months prior, and a sudden increase in alcohol consumption in the 6-8 weeks before her death. Her hair contained the highest concentration of coca yet identified in Andean human remains. Another DNA and chemical study of La Doncella's hair indicated that her diet improved significantly in the year before her death, including an increase in animal protein. In the weeks before the children's deaths, and leading up until just a few hours before, the children were subject to overfeeding, so they would go happy and content into the spirit world.

The children were likely brought to Cuzco, the ceremonial and political heart of the empire, before embarking on a long pilgrimage to the sacred summits following specific routes called ceque lines, ritual pathways set in a radial pattern with Cuzco at the center. Because the ceque lines were difficult to traverse, often extending straight even when crossing mountain ranges and difficult terrain, these pilgrimage practices functioned as highly visible and resource-intensive performances of devotion and loyalty that reinforced imperial Inca power and demanded cooperation from diverse groups of subjects.

After ascending Llullaillaco, the children were placed within a small burial chamber near the mountain's summit. Researchers concluded that La Doncella likely died while unconscious or asleep after consuming large quantities of coca and alcohol. Examination of her remains also revealed a bacterial lung infection, although it is unclear whether it contributed to her death.

The exact causes of death of La Niña del Rayo and El Niño remain uncertain. Archaeologist María Constanza Ceruti has suggested that El Niño may have experienced complications related to the extreme altitude, possibly including high-altitude pulmonary edema. Blood found in the oral cavity, in the absence of evidence for trauma, infection or disease, has been cited as supporting this interpretation.

== Condition and preservation ==
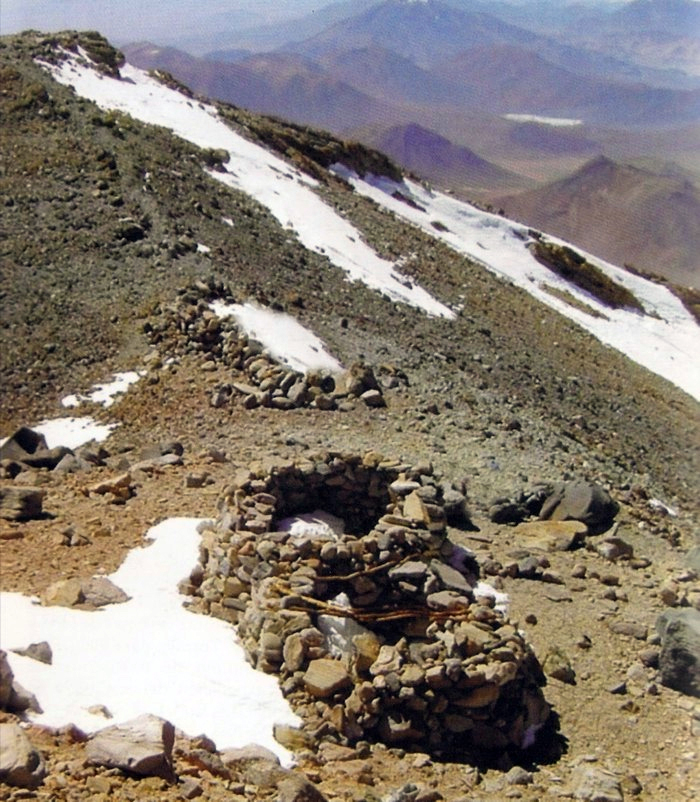
An archaeological site at the top of Llullaillaco

The Children of Llullaillaco remained remarkably well preserved for approximately 500 years after their burial near the summit of Llullaillaco, where cold temperatures and extremely dry conditions slowed decomposition. The mountain lies near the Atacama Desert, the driest non-polar desert on Earth, and the extreme dryness of the air is considered a major factor in their preservation. The bodies were entirely surrounded by volcanic ash, which both inhibited bacterial decomposition and protected the organic matter from the permafrost.

The children froze before significant dehydration could occur. As a result, their soft tissues, hair and internal organs survived in remarkable condition, and the shrinkage commonly associated with naturally preserved human remains did not occur. When the children were recovered, researchers reported that one of the hearts still contained frozen blood. Archaeologist Johan Reinhard stated that the mummies "appear to be the best preserved Inca mummies ever found", noting that even the arms remained perfectly preserved down to the individual hairs.

The condition of the three children differed slightly. After her burial, La Niña del Rayo was struck by lightning, which damaged part of her face, shoulder and one ear. Despite this damage, all three children remained exceptionally well preserved.

== The mummies ==
Three mummies were found at the Llullaillaco burial site: la Doncella (the maiden), la Niña del Rayo (the lightning girl) and el Niño (the boy). Once at the top of the mountain they had been allowed to fall asleep and then placed in a small tomb 1.5 metres (4.9 ft) underground, where they were left to die.

=== La Doncella ===
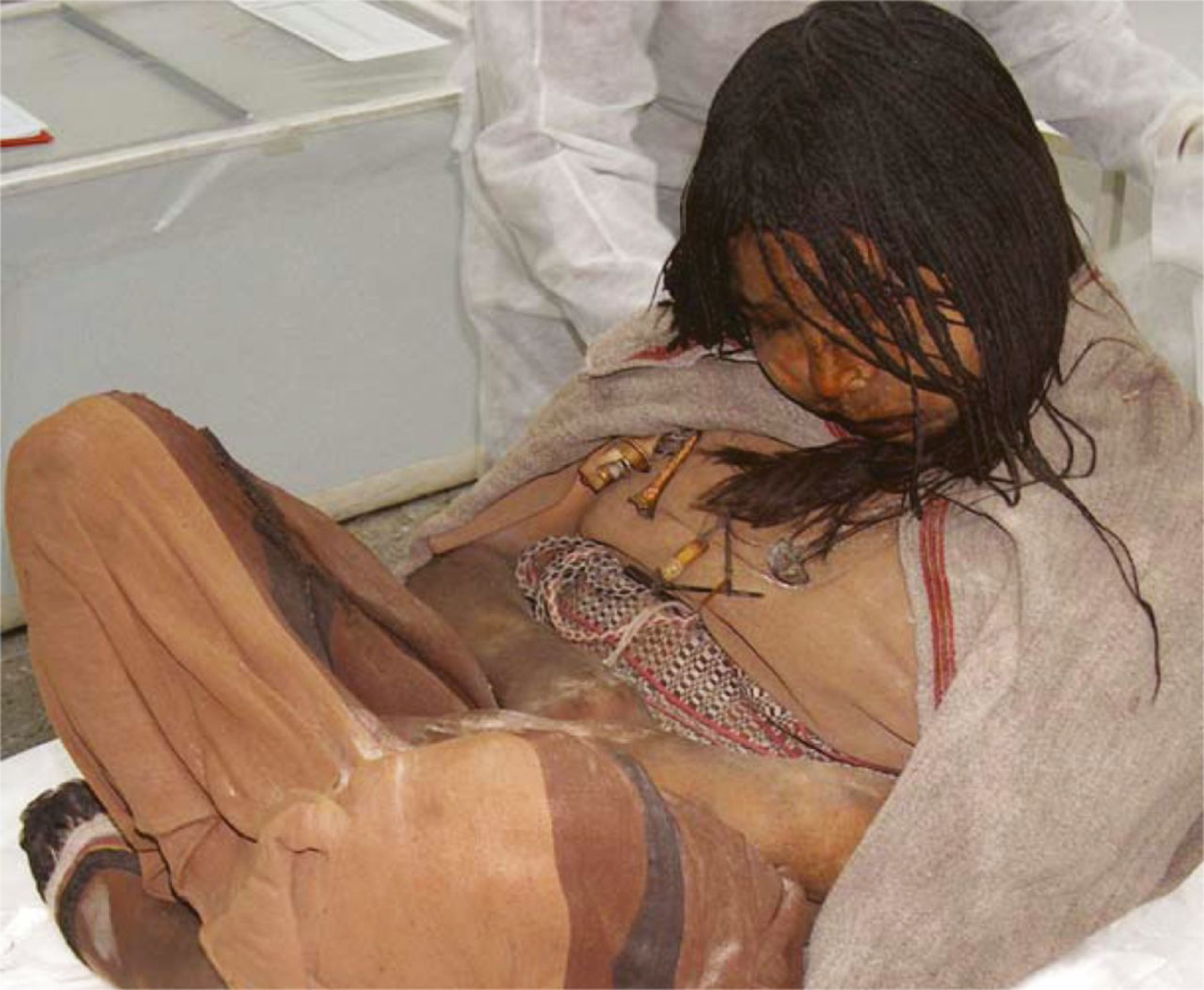
La Doncella on display

The oldest mummy, a girl found to be around the age of thirteen, was dubbed la doncella. She has become widely known as the "Maiden of Llullaillaco". She wore a dress with her hair elaborately braided, along with a feather-adorned headdress. She died in her sleep.

It is believed that La Doncella was an aclla, or Sun Virgin – she was a virgin, chosen and sanctified at around the age of ten years, to live with other girls and women who would become royal wives, priestesses and sacrifices.

Unlike the other two children, her skull did not appear to be artificially elongated through the practice of cranial deformation, which indicates that the three individuals likely came from different ethnic backgrounds. This tracks with the practice of sacrificial victims being selected or offered from communities all throughout the Inca empire.

=== La Niña del Rayo ===
La Niña del Rayo was approximately six years old when she was sacrificed. Her head was lifted high and she was facing south-west. She was wearing a traditional light brown aksu dress and her head, along with part of her body, was wrapped in a thick woolen blanket. In addition, her entire body was wrapped in another blanket, this one embroidered in red and yellow. Her skull appears to have been intentionally elongated.

La Niña del Rayo appears to have been treated less roughly than El Niño but without the care with which la doncella was treated.

=== El Niño ===
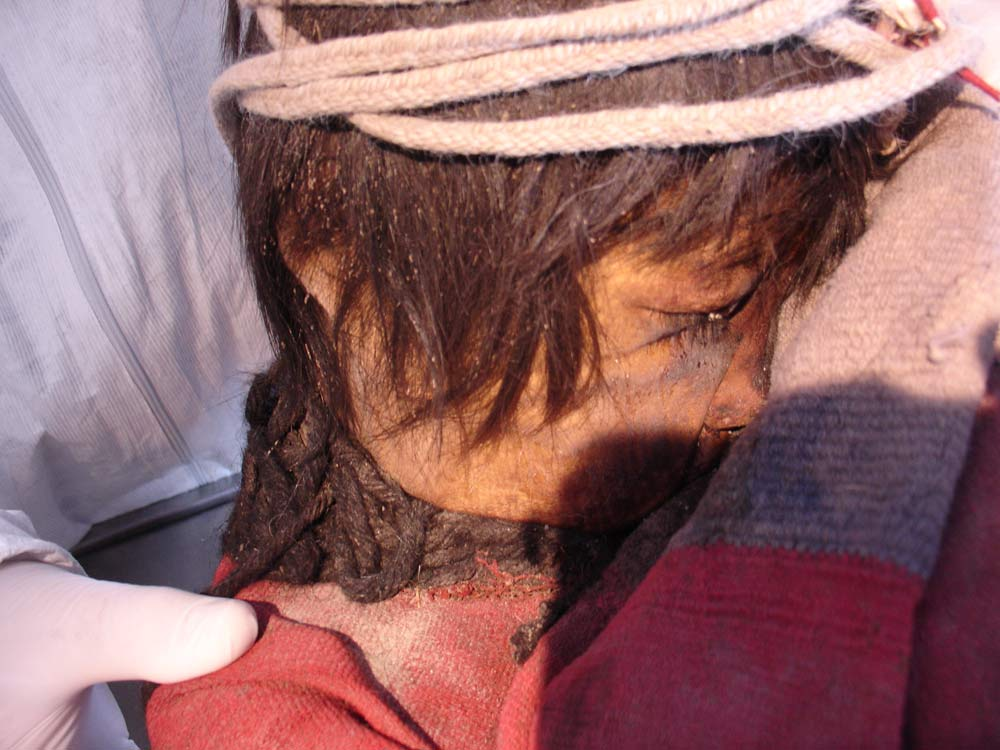
El Niño

El Niño was between four and five years old when he was sacrificed. He was the only child to be tied up. Lying in the fetal position, he was wearing a gray tunic, a silver bracelet and leather shoes and had been wrapped in a red and brown blanket. The skull of el niño had been slightly elongated, similarly to that of la Niña del Rayo. The hyper-flexed position and ropes may have aided in transporting him to the burial site—explaining why these elements were not present in similar remains.

El Niño was buried with a collection of small objects, some of them depicting finely dressed men driving caravans of llamas. A woolen sling was wrapped around his head; slings were used by men in a ritual activity to launch stones into the lagoons at the end of the dry season to hasten the coming of the rains.

== Exhibition and Indigenous perspectives ==
Since 2007, the Children of Llullaillaco have been exhibited at the Museum of High Altitude Archaeology in Salta, northwestern Argentina. To help preserve them, the museum developed a climate-controlled display system designed to replicate conditions on Llullaillaco. The exhibition opened after eight years of research and development, during which the children were cared for by the Catholic University of Salta.

The exhibition has been the subject of debate about Indigenous rights, the treatment of ancestral human remains and the ethics of displaying human bodies in museums. Some Indigenous leaders have argued that the children should have remained on Llullaillaco, the high Andean volcano where they were buried and which they regard as a sacred mountain. Rogelio Guanuco, leader of the Indigenous Association of Argentina (AIRA), described the exhibition as "a violation of our loved ones", while Fermín Tolaba, a leader of the Lule people, called for the children's return and criticised the museum's admission fees.

Indigenous responses have not been uniform. In 2004, the Third World Congress of the Quechua Language passed a resolution supporting continued research on the Children of Llullaillaco and the sharing of its findings as a means of "recognizing the greatness and the evolution of our ancestors from their origins to the present day".

According to Gabriel Miremont, director of the Museum of High Altitude Archaeology, concerns about maintaining positive relationships with Indigenous communities contributed to a decision not to remove additional mummies from similar high-altitude burial sites in the Andes. Some Indigenous representatives also questioned whether local communities would benefit from the economic activity generated by the exhibition of the children.

== See also ==
- Aconcagua mummy
- Mummy Juanita
- Plomo Mummy

== Bibliography ==
- Reinhard, Johan: The Ice Maiden: Inca Mummies, Mountain Gods, and Sacred Sites in the Andes. National Geographic Society, Washington, D.C., 2005.
- Reinhard, Johan and Ceruti, María Constanza: "Inca Rituals and Sacred Mountains: A Study of the World's Highest Archaeological Sites" Los Angeles: UCLA, 2010.
- Reinhard, Johan and Ceruti, María Constanza: Investigaciones arqueológicas en el Volcán Llullaillaco: Complejo ceremonial incaico de alta montaña. Salta: EUCASA, 2000.
- Reinhard, Johan and Ceruti, María Constanza: "Sacred Mountains, Ceremonial Sites and Human Sacrifice Among the Incas." Archaeoastronomy 19: 1–43, 2006.
- Ceruti, María Constanza: Llullaillaco: Sacrificios y Ofrendas en un Santuario Inca de Alta Montaña. Salta: EUCASA, 2003.
- Reinhard, Johan: "Llullaillaco: An Investigation of the World's Highest Archaeological Site." Latin American Indian Literatures Journal 9(1): 31–54, 1993.
- Beorchia, Antonio: "El cementerio indígena del volcán Llullaillaco." Revista del Centro de Investigaciones Arqueológicas de Alta Montaña 2: 36–42, 1975, San Juan.
- Previgliano, Carlos, Constanza Ceruti, Johan Reinhard, Facundo Arias, and Josefina Gonzalez: "Radiologic Evaluation of the Llullaillaco Mummies." American Journal of Roentgenology 181: 1473–1479, 2003.
- Wilson, Andrew; Taylor, Timothy; Ceruti, Constanza; Reinhard, Johan; Chávez, José Antonio; Grimes, Vaughan; Wolfram-Meier-Augenstein; Cartmell, Larry; Stern, Ben; Richards, Michael; Worobey, Michael; Barnes, Ian; Gilbert, Thomas (2007). "Stable isotope and DNA evidence for ritual sequences in Inca child sacrifice". Proceedings of the National Academy of Sciences. 104 (42): 16456–16461. Bibcode:2007PNAS..10416456W. doi:10.1073/pnas.0704276104. PMC 2034262. PMID 17923675.
- Complete description, history, place name and routes of Llullaillaco in Andeshandbook
- Museum of High Mountain Archaeology (in Spanish)
- ""Llullaillaco"". SummitPost.org.
