= Andean Sanctuaries Museum =

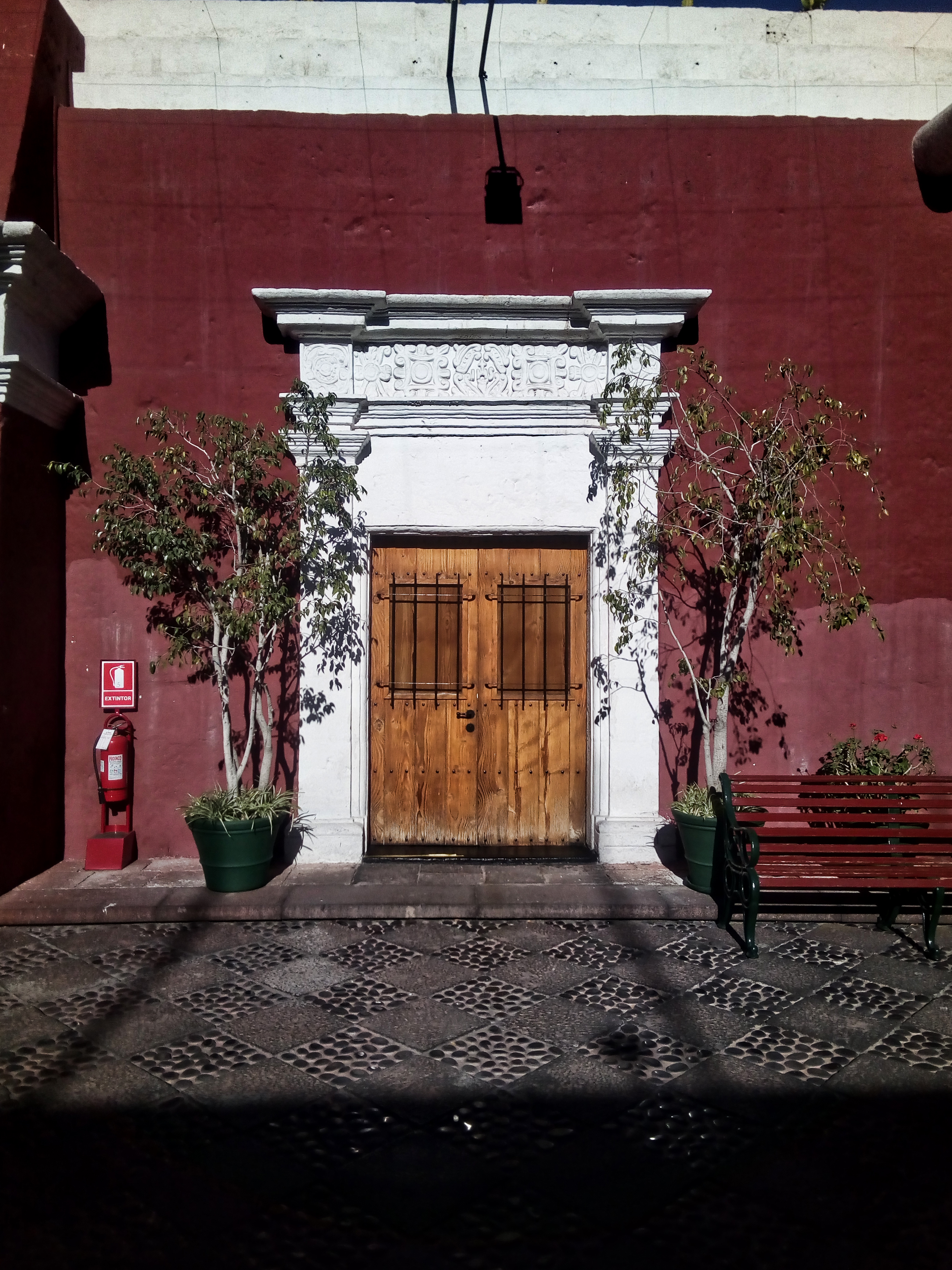
- Established: December 5, 1996; 28 years ago
- Location: Arequipa, Peru
- Coordinates: 16.399820°S 71.537787°W
- Type: Archaeological museum

The Andean Sanctuaries Museum (Spanish: Museo Santuarios Andinos) is an archaeological museum in Arequipa, Peru.

== History ==
The museum was founded in 1996 by resolution N° 3966-R-97, the creation of this museum was to conserve the archaeological artifacts of the project Santuarios de Altura del Sur Andino, this project began in 1980 by the archaeologists José Chavéz and Johan Reinhard in the mountains of southern Peru. In March 2020, two archaeologists from the Catholic University of Santa María conducted an analysis of the museum's textiles. In November 2020, the museum was declared a National Cultural Heritage Site by the Ministry of Culture.

== Collections ==
The museum contains the Juanita mummy, a mummy that was found in the Ampato volcano after an expedition in 1995 by archeologists José Chavez and Johan Reinhard. The museum has a collection of polychromatic ceramic pieces, also the museum has the Spondylus shells that were moved from the coast of Peru to the massif by Inca priests, also the museum has woven dolls representing people and woven bags used by the indigenous people of Peru to collect coca leaves. The museum also has photographs of South American camelids. The museum contains archaeological remains of Human Sacrifices in the Misti volcano. The museum exhibits Inca aryballus and ancient utensils used by the indigenous civilizations of Peru, in addition, the museum contains copper, silver and gold statuettes. The museum also contains wooden qirus and a collection of metals that were used as indigenous offerings to the gods. The museum also contains the Urpicha mummy. The museum also contains the Sarita mummy that was found in the Sara Sara volcano.
