= Johan Reinhard =

American anthropologist

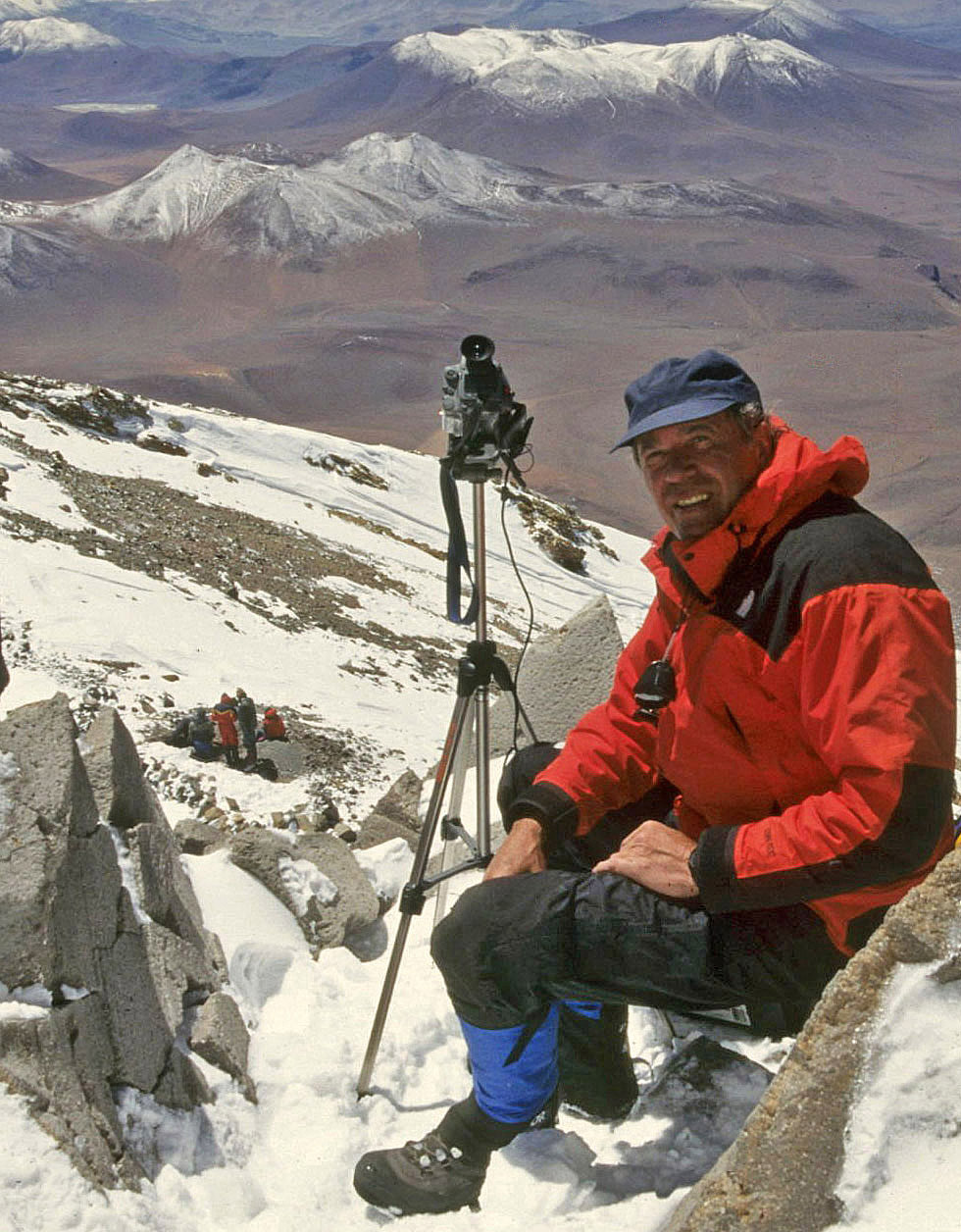
- Johan Reinhard, Llullaillaco volcano, 1999
- Born: Joliet, Illinois, United States
- Education: University of Arizona, University of Vienna
- Scientific career
- Fields: Anthropology, archaeology
- Workplaces: Future Generations University formerly, National Geographic Society
- Website: www.johanreinhard.net

Johan Reinhard is an American anthropologist and archaeologist. Currently, he is an Explorer at the National Geographic Society. He is also a senior research fellow at The Mountain Institute, a visiting professor at Catholic University, Salta, Argentina, an honorary professor of Catholic University, Arequipa, Peru.

Reinhard is famous for his discoveries of Inca mummies, including Mummy Juanita and frozen sacrifices on the peaks of the Andes in Peru and Argentina. He also has explored the sacred valleys of the Himalayas and performed underwater archaeology in some of the world's highest lakes. His investigations have led him to present theories to explain the mystery of the Nazca Lines (the giant desert drawings), pre-Hispanic ceremonial sites built on Andean mountain summits, and the ancient ceremonial centers of Machu Picchu, Chavin, and Tiahuanaco.

== Career ==
Born in Joliet, Illinois, Johan Reinhard lived in New Lenox, Illinois until 1962. A graduate of Lincoln-Way Community HS (District 210), where he also set the school record in the 220 yard run. He began his undergraduate studies at the University of Arizona, before going on to receive his Ph.D. in Anthropology from the University of Vienna, Austria (1974). Much his current research focuses on the sacred beliefs and cultural practices of mountain peoples and in the preservation of their cultural patrimony, especially in the Andes and the Himalayas. His anthropological field research since 1980 has primarily focused on the Incas and sacred landscape in Argentina, Bolivia, Chile, Ecuador, and Peru.

During 1989–1992 he directed an underwater archaeological research project in Lake Titicaca, the world’s highest navigable lake (12,500 ft), that resulted in the discovery of rare Inca and Tiahuanaco (pre-Inca) artifacts. He has lived more than ten years in the Himalayas, conducting anthropological research primarily in Nepal, but he has also undertaken investigations in Tibet, Bhutan, Sikkim, and the Garhwal Himalaya.

His studies in Nepal included culture change among the Raji of nomadic hunter-gatherers to settled agriculturalists; Himalayan shamanism; the role of sacred mountains in Tibetan Buddhism and Hinduism; the sacred "hidden lands" of Tibetan Buddhism (seven of which he has explored); and two of the world's last nomadic hunting and gathering tribes: the Raute and Kusunda. While in Nepal, he also directed Peace Corps Training Projects and was a member of teams that made some of the first rafting descents of Trisuli and Sun Kosi rivers. Elsewhere in South Asia, in 1977 he studied Muslim fishermen in the Maldive Islands (Indian Ocean).

While living in Austria during 1972, he participated in an underwater archaeological study of a Neolithic site at Mondsee. In 1965 and 1967, he was also a member of teams which undertook nautical archaeological research of Roman shipwrecks in the Mediterranean Sea off southern Italy and of an Iron Age Villanovan village in a northern Italian lake (Lago di Bolsena) in 1965. His interest in the Iceman led to his study in recent years of the role of sacred landscape in Neolithic religion in the central Alps.

Johan first began mountain climbing in 1964 in the Alps and in the mid-1970s in the Himalayas, including participating on the successful 1976 American Everest Expedition and making a first ascent in 1979 of the South Face of Buni Zom (21,500 ft) in the Hindu Kush (Pakistan). His climbs in the Andes began in 1980 with ascents of mountains in Ecuador, and he eventually climbed the majority of Andean peaks over 6,500 m (21,325 feet)—several of them solo. A historian of Andean ascents for the American Alpine Club noted in the early 1990s that Johan had climbed more high-altitude Andean peaks (over 20,000 feet) than any other person.

While sky diving in the 1960s–1970s, Johan participated in 150 jumps in Europe and the US, including in snow, in water, at night, and in large free fall "stars," besides having made jumps with groups from over 20,000 feet in 1963— world records at the time. In 1979 he made one of the first crossings by a westerner of the Great Indian (Thar) Desert by camel, in 1980 one of the few land crossings of Tierra del Fuego in Chile, and in 1980 one of the few crossings of the Llanganatis mountain range in Ecuador to reach the Amazon.

Reinhard participated in underwater archaeological investigations of sacred lakes of the Incas, including in the crater lake of Licancabur in 1981–82 (the world's highest dive at 19,300 ft), and a lake at 19,100 ft on Paniri volcano in 1983. During 1987 and 2004, he dove in lower-lying lakes near Cuzco (including lakes Urcos, Huacarpay and Piuray), and in the highlands of Ecuador in 2009, while in 2007 and 2010 he was a member of teams that investigated sacred lakes of the Aztecs (13,800 ft) on Toluca volcano in Mexico and underwater archaeological sites in Lake Issyk Kul in Kyrgyzstan in 2010.

He has investigated traditional religious beliefs and climbed sacred mountains in Greece in 2002, in Bali, Indonesia during 2007, and in Venezuela, Mongolia, and the Holy Land (Israel) in 2012. He has served as a cinematographer for the BBC, the Smithsonian Institution, and the Scientific Film Institute of Germany, and his research has been featured in several TV documentaries, including National Geographic, BBC, NOVA, PBS, and Discovery. He is an avid photographer and his images have appeared in over a hundred newspapers, books and magazines, including National Geographic, Time, Newsweek, etc., and with thousands of these images available on his website.

He has lectured on cruise ships traveling in the Caribbean, along the Pacific coast of South America, and to Antarctica, the Galapagos, and Easter Island, and also lectured on round-the-world flights for the National Geographic Society. He speaks Spanish, Nepali, and German, and in Nepal he analyzed two unwritten languages: Raji, a Tibeto-Burman language, and Kusunda, a linguistic isolate.

== Discoveries ==
While making over 200 ascents in the Andes, he led expeditions resulting in the discovery of more than 50 high altitude Inca ritual sites. He directed teams that recovered four Inca human sacrifices on Ampato (20,708 ft) in southern Peru, including the Mummy Juanita (the "Ice Maiden").

His expeditions in the Andes during 1996–1999 led to the discovery of fourteen more Inca human sacrifices on five mountains above 18,000 ft. In 1999 he directed the excavations of three of the world's best preserved mummies at over 22,000 feet (6,739 m) on Llullaillaco, the world’s highest archaeological site.

In 1995 and 1999 Time selected Dr. Reinhard's finds as among “the world's ten most important scientific discoveries” of those years—making him one of the few scientists to have had his research chosen twice for this recognition. In 1968 in Nepal he found the Raute and Kusunda, two of the world's last nomadic hunting and gathering tribes, the latter with only a few speakers of a language unrelated to any other and one of the world's rarest languages.

== Recognitions ==
Johan Reinhard has received several awards for his research in the Andes, including the Rolex Award for Enterprise in 1987, the Puma de Oro (Bolivia's highest award in the field of archaeology) in 1992, and the Gold Medal of the city of Arequipa (Peru) in 1996. In 1997 he was twice noted in the Guinness Book of Records. His book for young adults on his discovery of the Ice Maiden was selected as an "Outstanding Book" in 1998 by the Junior Library Guild. In 2000 he was selected by Outside magazine as one of "today’s 25 most extraordinary explorers," and in 2001 the Ford Motor Company chose him as one of twelve "Heroes for the Planet." In 2002 his finds of the frozen Inca mummies were highlighted by Time in their book Great Discoveries about the world's most important finds from all fields of science. He received the prestigious Explorers Medal of the Explorers Club in 2002 for his contributions to the field of exploration. Three museums have been built to exhibit the archaeological finds made during his expeditions: the Museo Santuarios Andinos (Museum of Andean Sanctuaries) in Arequipa, Peru; the Museum of High Altitude Archaeology (MAAM) in Salta, Argentina; and a site museum in the village of Challapampa, Island of the Sun, Lake Titicaca, Bolivia. In 2017 he received the Sir Edmund Hillary Mountain Legacy Medal for archaeological discoveries and scholarship in the Himalayas and the Andes.

== Literature ==
Johan Reinhard has over eighty publications and is a member of several organizations, including the American Anthropological Association, the Society for American Archaeology, the Explorers Club, the Institute of Andean Studies, and the Royal Geographical Society.

Books

- Inca Rituals and Sacred Mountains: A Study of the World's Highest Archaeological Sites (with Constanza Ceruti), University of California. Los Angeles (2010) ISBN 978-1931745765
- Machu Picchu: Exploring an Ancient Sacred Center, University of California, Los Angeles (2007) ISBN 978-1931745444
- The Ice Maiden: Inca Mummies, Mountain Gods, and Sacred Sites in the Andes, National Geographic Society, Washington, D.C. (2005) ISBN 978-1-4262-0176-9
- Machu Picchu: The Sacred Center, Instituto Machu Picchu, Lima (2002) ISBN 9972966402
- Investigaciones arqueológicas en el Volcán Llullaillaco: Complejo ceremonial incaico de alta montaña (with Constanza Ceruti), Universidad Católica, Salta (2000) ISBN 950-623-005-6
- Discovering the Inca Ice Maiden. National Geographic Society, Washington, D.C. (1998) ISBN 0-7922-7142-4
- Exploraciones Arqueológicas Subacuáticas en el Lago Titikaka, (with Carlos Ponce et al.) Editorial La Palabra, La Paz (1992)
- The Nazca Lines: A New Perspective on their Origin and Meaning. Editorial Los Pinos, Lima (1988, 4th ed.) ISBN 84-89291-17-9
- Las Líneas de Nazca: Un Nuevo Enfoque sobre su Origen y Significado, Editorial Los Pinos, Lima (1987) ISBN 84-89291-18-7
- Nepal Cross-Cultural Trainers Manual (with Underwood and Shrestha), New Educational Research Associates, Kathmandu (1978)

Articles

- Inca Mummies on Andean Peaks. In The Modern Explorers, Hanbury-Tenison, R. and Twigger, R. (eds.), Thames & Hudson, London (2013)
- Sacred Featherwork of the Inca. In Peruvian Featherworks: Art of the Precolumbian Era, King, H. (ed.), the Metropolitan Museum of Art, New York (2012)
- Las Montañas Sagradas y las Culturas Preincaicas de los Andes. In América: Tierras de Montañas y Volcanes. Huellas de la Arqueología. Chávez, M., Iwaniszewski, S., and Cabrera, R. (eds.), Instituto Nacional de Antropología y Historia (INAH), México, D.F. (2012)
- Inca Mummies: Child Sacrifice on Andean Peaks. In Discovery: Unearthing the New Treasures of Archaeology, Fagan, B. (ed.), Thames & Hudson, London (2007)
- Cloud Diving. In They Lived to Tell the Tale: True Stories of Modern Adventure from the Legendary Explorers Club. Russell, J. (ed.), Lyons Press, New York (2007)
- Into the Hidden Crater—An Andean Adventure. Explorers Journal (2003)
- A High Altitude Archaeological Survey in Northern Chile. Revista Chungara (2002)
- Sacred Landscape: The Prehistoric Cultures of the Andes. In Extreme Landscape, MacDonald, B. (ed.), National Geographic Society (2002)
- Coropuna: Templo y Montaña de los Incas. Revista del Centro de Investigaciones Arqueológicas de Alta Montaña (2001)
- Frozen in Time. National Geographic 196 (5) (1999)
- New Inca Mummies. National Geographic 194 (I) (1998)
- The Temple of Blindness: An Investigation of the Inca Shrine of Ancocagua, Andean Past (1998)
- Llullaillaco: Investigación del Yacimiento Arqueológico más Alto del Mundo, Anales de Arqueología y Etnología (1997)
- Sharp Eyes of Science Probe the Mummies of Peru. National Geographic (1997)
- Peru’s Ice Maidens. National Geographic (1996)
- House of the Sun: The Inca Temple of Vilcanota. Latin American Antiquity (1995)
- Llullaillaco: An Investigation of the World's Highest Archaeological Site. Latin American Indian Languages Journal (1993)
- Tiahuanaco, Centro Sagrado de los Andes, In Guía Cultural y Turística de Bolivia. Fundación Cultural, La Paz (1992)
- Underwater Archaeological Research in Lake Titicaca, Bolivia. In Ancient America: Contributions to New World Archaeology, Saunders, N. (ed.), Oxbow Books, Oxford (1992)
- An Archaeological Investigation of Inca Ceremonial Platforms on the Volcano Copiapo, Central Chile, In Ancient America: Contributions to New World Archaeology, Saunders, N. (ed.), Oxbow Books, Oxford (1992)
- Sacred Peaks of the Andes. National Geographic (1992)
- Interpreting the Nazca Lines. In The Ancient Americas: Art From Sacred Landscapes, Townsend, R. (ed.), The Art Institute of Chicago, Chicago.
- Investigación Arqueológica de las Plataformas Inca Ceremoniales en los Volcanes de Copiapo y Jotabeche (Región de Atacama). Revista Contribución Arqueológica (1991)
- Tiwanaku: Ensayo sobre su cosmovisión. Revista Pumapunku (1991)
- Tiahuanaco, Sacred Center of the Andes. In The Cultural Guide of Bolivia, McFarren, P. (ed.), Fundación Cultural Quipus, La Paz (1990)
- Heights of Interest. South American Explorer (1990)
- Informe sobre una sección del camino Inca y las ruinas en la cresta que baja del nevado de Tucarhuay. Revista Sacsahuaman (1990)
- Mysteries of Lake Titicaca: Archaeology Beneath the Waves. In The Cultural Guide of Bolivia, McFarren, P. (ed.), Fundación Cultural Quipus, La Paz (1990)
- The Nazca Lines, Water and Mountains: An Ethno-archaeological Study. In Recent Studies in Pre-Columbian Archaeology, N. Saunders and O. de Montmollin (eds.), British Archaeological Reports, Oxford
- The Sacred Himalaya, American Alpine Journal (1987)
- Chavín y Tiahuanaco: Una Nueva Perspectiva de Dos Centros Ceremoniales Andinos. Boletín de Lima (1987)
- Chavin and Tiahuanaco: A New Look at Two Andean Ceremonial Centers. National Geographic Research (1985)
- Sacred Mountains: An Etthno-Archaeological Study of High Andean Ruins. Mountain Research and Development (1985)
- High-Altitude Archaeology and Andean Mountain Gods. American Alpine Journal (1983)
- Las Montañas Sagradas: Un Estudio Etnoarqueológico de Ruinas en las Altas Cumbres Andinas. Cuadernos de Historia (1983)
- The Chonos of the Chilean Archipelago. Bulletin of the International Committee on Urgent Anthropological and Ethnological Research (1981)
- Khembalung: The Hidden Valley. Kailash, A Journal of Himalayan Studies (1978)
- Shamanism among the Raji of Southwest Nepal. In Spirit Possession in the Nepal Himalayas, Hitchcock, J. & Jones, R. (eds.), Vikas Publishing House, New Delhi (1976)
- Shamanism and Spirit Possession: The Definition Problem. In Spirit Possession in the Nepal Himalayas, Hitchcock, J. & Jones, R. (eds.), Vikas Publishing House, New Delhi (1976)
- The Ban Rajas: A Vanishing Tribe. Contributions to Nepalese Studies (1976)
- The Raute: Notes on a Nomadic Hunting and Gathering Tribe of Nepal. Kailash, A Journal of Himalayan Studies (1974)
- Underwater Archaeology in Austria: A Preliminary Report. International Journal of Nautical Archaeology and Underwater Exploration (1974)
- Preliminary Report on Wood Working in Nepal. Anzeiger der philosophische-historischen Klasse der Osterreichischen Akadamie der Wissenschaften (1969)
- Preliminary Report on Pottery Making in the Kathmandu Valley, Nepal. Anzeiger der philosophische-historischen Klasse der Osterreichischen Akadamie der Wissenschaften (1969)
- Aperçu sur les Kusunda: peuple chasseur du Népal, Objets et Mondes (1969)
- The Kusunda: Ethnographic Notes on a Hunting Tribe of Nepal. Bulletin of the International Committee on Urgent Anthropological and Ethnological Research (1968)

In collaboration

- Archaeological, radiological, and biological evidence offer insight into Inca child sacrifice. Proceedings of the National Academy of Sciences (co-authored with A. Wilson, et al.) (2013)
- Síntesis de Estudios Interdisciplinarios en las Momias Congeladas del Volcán Llullaillaco (co-authored with Constanza Ceruti, Previgliano, C., González J., & Arias F.). In XV Congreso Nacional de Arqueología Argentina, Austral, A. and Tamagnini, M. (eds.) (2009)
- Stable isotope and DNA evidence for ritual sequences in Inca child sacrifice (co-authored with Andrew Wilson, et al.). Proceedings of the National Academy of Sciences (2007)
- Sacred Mountains, Ceremonial Sites, and Human Sacrifice Among the Inca (co-authored with Constanza Ceruti). Archaeoastronomy (2005)
- A Compositional Analysis of Pottery Vessels Associated with the Inca Ritual of Capacocha (co-authored with Tamara Bray, Minc, L., Ceruti, C., Perea, R. & Chávez, J.A.). Journal of Anthropological Archaeology (2005)
- Rescue Archaeology of the Inca Mummy on Mount Quehuar, Argentina (co-authored with Constanza Ceruti). In Proceedings of the Fifth World Mummy Congress, Torino (2005).
- Paleoradiologic Evaluation of the Llullaillaco Mummies (co-authored with Carlos Previgliano, et al.). American Journal of Roentgenology (2003)
- Expedición Arqueológica al Altiplano de Tarapacá y sus Cumbres (co-authored with Julio Sanhueza). Revista de Corporación para el Desarrollo de la Ciencia (1982).
- Expedición Arqueológica al Volcán Licancabur (co-authored with Ana Maria Baron). Revista de Corporación para el Desarrollo de la Ciencia (1981)
- Ascensión al Volcán Licancabur y Otros Nevados (co-authored with George Serracino and Ana Maria Barón). Revista del Centro de Investigaciones Arqueológicos de Alta Montaña (1980)
