= MAAM =

The acronym MAAM may refer to:

- Mid-Atlantic Air Museum, United States
- Museum of High Altitude Archaeology (Museo de Arqueología de Alta Montaña), Argentina
