= Gloria Lisé =

Argentinian writer

- Born: March 26, 1961 (age 65); Salta Province, Argentina
- Occupation: Writer
- Writing career
- Notable work: Departing at Dawn (2009)

Gloria Lisé (the author's pseudonym) (born March 22, 1961) is an Argentinian writer, playwright, lawyer, professor, and an accomplished musician. She is the author of Con los Pies en el Escenario: Trayectoria del Grupo Arte Dramático y su Director Salo Lisé (2003), a book based on the life of her father, the novel Viene Clareando (2005), which was chosen by Argentina’s National Commission for the Protection of Public Libraries for distribution to the country’s public libraries, and Paisaje de Final de Época, 2012 first literature prize in the novel category from the Province of Salta. Viene Clareando, whose title refers to Atahualpa Yupanqui's famous song of the same name, was published in the United States translated as Departing at Dawn by The Feminist Press at CUNY in 2009. It was also translated to Portuguese in Brazil as Vem Clareando (2013) by the Incentivar publishing house. It was reedited in Spanish by the Biblioteca de Textos Universitarios in 2015.

She is also the biographer of Constanza Ceruti, the archeologist who discovered the Llullaillaco Mummies in the high mountains of the Andes.

== Biography ==
Lisé was born in the Salta Province of northwestern Argentina in 1961. During her primary and secondary schooling, Lisé enrolled in the Music Conservatory of Salta, where she studied the piano and cello under some of Argentina's greatest musicians. She was also a professional singer in the Coro Estable of the Province of Tucumán.

Lisé was 15 years old when a coup d'état overthrew Isabel Perón's government and a military junta took control of Argentina on March 24, 1976. The political turmoil of this era inspired her to write her novels Viene Clareando and Paisaje de Final de Época, which focus on the impact of Argentina's Dirty War on its citizens.

The writer earned her law degree from the National University of Tucumán and her master's degree in natural and cultural heritage assessment from the Catholic University of Salta. In addition to writing two books, Lisé often contributes to Argentinian publications about artistic and cultural heritage. Currently she works as a lawyer and professor at the National University of Salta.

== Bibliography ==
- Con los pies en el escenario: Trayectoria del Grupo Arte Dramático y su Director Salo Lisé (2003), 249 pp. ISBN 987-43-5586-7.
- Viene Clareando (Leviatan, 2005), 159 pp. Leviatán.
- Departing at Dawn (The Feminist Press at CUNY, 2009)
- Vem Clareando (2013, Incentivar)
- Paisaje de Final de Época (Primer premio. Concursos literarios provinciales 2012. Categoría Novela. Leviatán ISBN 9789875149700.
- Donde el cielo besa la tierra. Biografía de Constanza Ceruti, la arqueóloga de Alta Montaña que descubrió las Momias del Llullaillaco. 2017 Mundo Gráfico Salta ISBN 978-987-698-199-6.
- Gertrudis Chale: pintora de los suburbios y de las montañas, Leviatán 2018
- Gertrudis Chale. Pintora "Como un ángel de greda", editorial Salta: Mundo Gráfico Salta Editorial, 2023. 232 pp. ISBN 978-987-698-420-1
- Pistas, huellas, marcas y deseo, 2011.
- Leales, 2012.
