= Plomo Mummy =

15th-century Inca child mummy

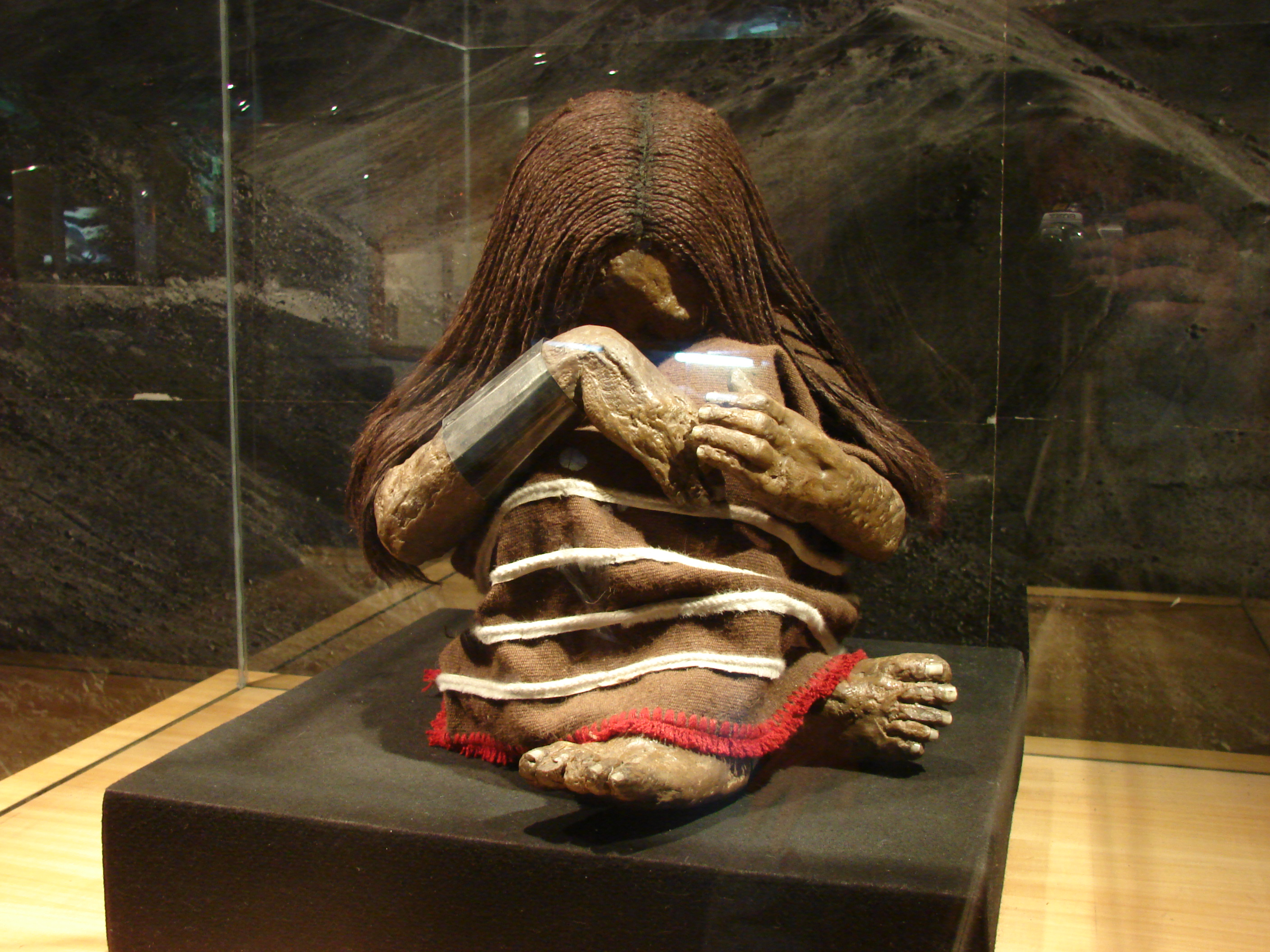
- Replica of the Plomo Mummy on display at the National Museum of Natural History in Santiago
- Born: c. 15th century Inca Empire
- Died: c. late 15th century Cerro El Plomo, present-day Chile
- Body discovered: 1 February 1954
- Resting place: National Museum of Natural History, Santiago, Chile
- Other names: Boy of El Plomo; El Plomo Mummy; La Momia del Cerro El Plomo
- Known for: Exceptionally well-preserved Inca child mummy and one of the earliest major discoveries of a high-altitude qhapaq hucha sacrifice

The Plomo Mummy (also known as the Boy of El Plomo, El Plomo Mummy, or La Momia del Cerro El Plomo) is the exceptionally well-preserved frozen mummy of an Inca boy who died during a qhapaq hucha sacrifice on Cerro El Plomo near Santiago, Chile, in the late 15th century. Discovered on 1 February 1954, he became one of the earliest major discoveries of a high-altitude Inca sacrificial mummy. His body, clothing, grave goods, internal organs, braided hair and painted facial markings were preserved by the cold, dry conditions of the high Andes. The mummy is cared for by the National Museum of Natural History in Santiago, where a replica has been displayed since 1982 while the original remains in climate-controlled storage.

== Discovery ==
On February 1, 1954, the mummified body of a pre-Columbian child was discovered by a group of climbers at the peak of the El Plomo mountain (at an altitude of 17,716 feet) located in the Andes mountain range near Santiago, Chile. Guillermo Chacón Carrasco, Luis Gerardo Ríos Barrueto, and Jaime Ríos Abarca departed the village of Puente Alto, near Santiago, late January. They were muleteers who went on a short expedition in hopes of finding artifacts and ritual offerings that they could later sell. Once they reached the peak of the El Plomo mountain, they came across a ceremonial complex which consisted of four stone structures. Under one of these structures they found the tomb of the mummy and grave goods surrounding it.

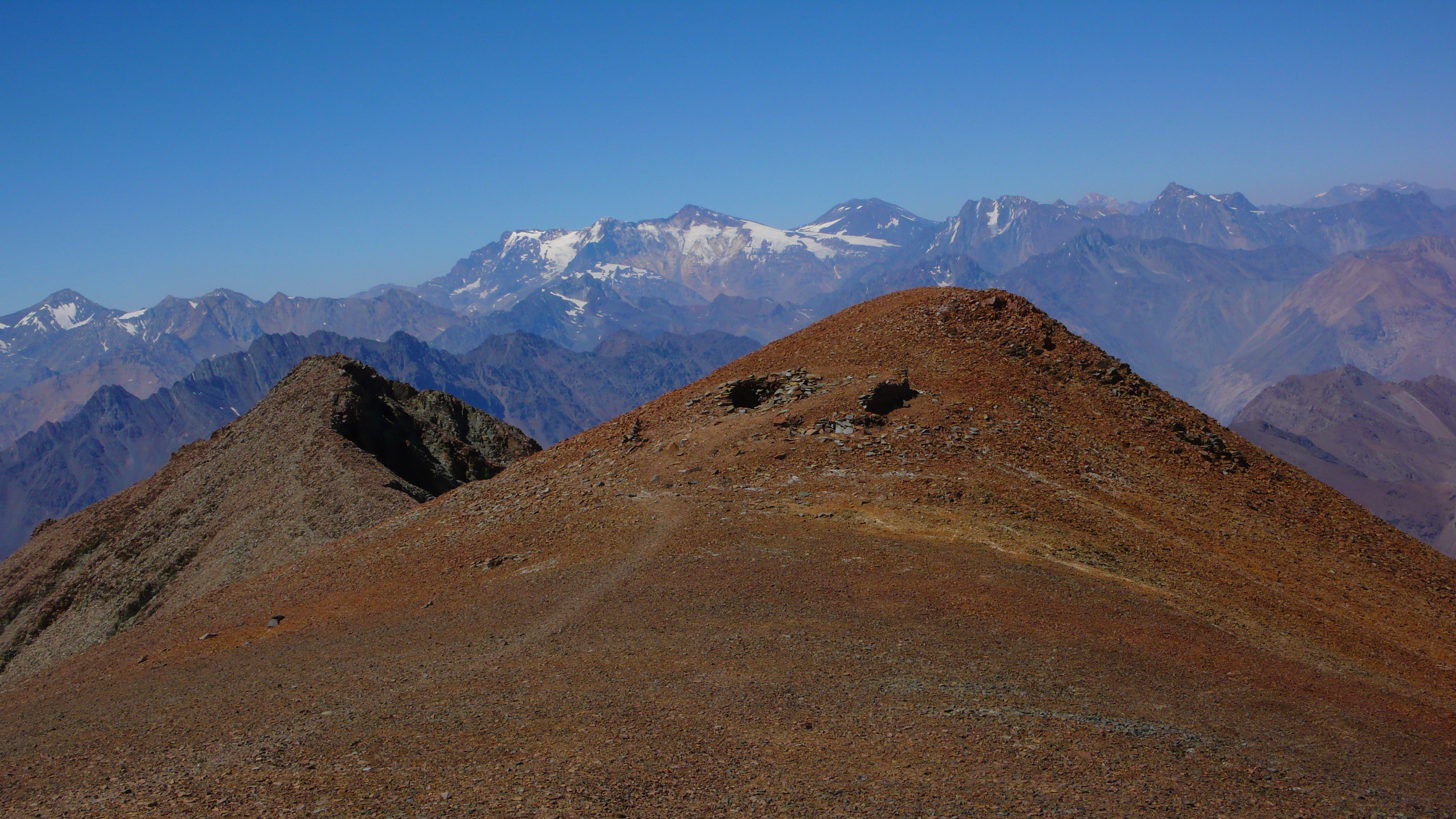
The Adoratorio near the site where the mummy was found. (Altitude 5,200 m)

The mummy was located in a 1 meter deep pit, covered with a capstone in one of several small stone structures. The mummy was discovered fully clothed in a sitting position with his arms wrapped around his knees. The mummy was named "La Momia del Cerro el Plomo" after his discovery's location.

They decided to take the grave goods, but relocated the frozen body to another cave, and left to go back to Puente Alto with the goods they collected throughout their expedition. A few weeks later, they traveled to Santiago in an attempt to sell the artifacts to the Museo Nacional de Historia Natural (Chilean National Museum of Natural History).

On February 16, 1954, one of the men that found the mummy informed Dr. Grete Mostny of the discovery, who was at that time the Head of Anthropology at the Chilean National Museum of Natural History. Mostny and the men that discovered the mummy came to a monetary agreement, and the mummy was handed over to the museum.

== Condition and preservation ==
The Boy of El Plomo remained exceptionally well preserved for more than 500 years because of the conditions at his burial site on Cerro El Plomo in the Andes Mountains near Santiago, Chile. Cold temperatures and low humidity slowed decomposition and helped preserve his body, clothing and grave goods.

Examination of the remains showed that preservation extended beyond the skeleton. Researchers reported that the boy's internal organs remained intact, while the tissues beneath the outer layer of skin remained soft. Preservation was so complete that his face could clearly be seen to be painted with red and ochre stripes and his hair remained braided into more than 200 individual braids, which were held in place by a headband made from human hair.

== Associated objects and clothing ==
The Boy of El Plomo was buried wearing garments made from alpaca and llama wool. He wore a black sleeveless tunic and a large grey shawl wrapped around his body. A headdress decorated with condor feathers rested on his head. A pair of unused leather moccasins had been placed on his feet. The child also wore two pieces of silver jewellery: a heavy bracelet and an H-shaped pendant.

A number of objects accompanied the burial. These included several figurines, among them a silver female figure dressed in miniature clothing, a llama figurine covered in gold, and another llama figure made from red shell. Archaeologists also recovered a small woven bag containing coca leaves, which reportedly retained their fragrance when the burial was examined. Additional offerings consisted of several small balls made from animal intestines that contained human hair, fingernail clippings, and teeth.

The objects buried with him suggest that he may have come from a high-status family. He was buried wearing finely made clothing woven from alpaca and llama wool, along with silver jewellery and an elaborate feathered headdress. The quality of these items is consistent with that found in other capacocha burials.

== Cause of death ==
The Plomo Mummy was the first notable frozen mummy discovery of high-altitude Capacocha human sacrifice by the Incas, a practice called qhapaq hucha.

The precise cause of death is uncertain, but is likely due to suffocation after being buried alive. Vomit stains were found around the boy's lips and on his clothing. A possible explanation for this is that he was being given maize beer and coca to induce numbing effects for the sacrifice.

A paper published in July 2026 concluded that the boy may have died of blunt force trauma, as indicated by a perimortem fracture of the left frontal bone that is consistent with a deliberately targeted strike rather than an accidental fall.

== Scientific examinations ==
=== Age ===
The Boy of El Plomo was about eight or nine years old when he died. Researchers estimated his age from the development of his skeleton and teeth. During the 2003 CT study, a pediatric radiologist reassessed a hand X-ray taken in 1954, while a dental specialist examined his developing teeth in the new scans. The two methods gave similar results. A further CT-based assessment published in 2026 also estimated his age at eight or nine.

=== Height ===
The National Museum of Natural History estimates his height at 1.40–1.44 metres (4 ft 7 in–4 ft 9 in).

=== Health ===
Studies of the boy's body suggest that he was adequately nourished. A 2003 CT scan found that his subcutaneous fat, muscles and bones had developed normally. It found no dental cavities or signs of significant tooth wear. The radiologists also saw structures under both arms that resembled lymph nodes. They could not tell whether these reflected an infection or had simply become more visible after death.

The earliest examination found eggs of Trichuris trichiura, or whipworm, in his intestinal contents. In 2011, Héctor Rodríguez and colleagues reported a second parasitic finding: numerous cysts consistent with Trichinella in a sample of thigh muscle. They concluded that he had a substantial Trichinella infection. Neither finding establishes what symptoms he experienced.

The boy also had head lice. Patrick Horne and Silvia Quevedo Kawasaki found numerous eggs in his hair during the 1982 examination, although they found no adult lice. Electron microscopy of wart-like lesions on one hand identified human papillomavirus. A biopsy of an ulcerated lesion on a leg was diagnosed as an inflamed lymphangiokeratoma, a lesion involving small lymphatic vessels in the skin.

His feet showed marked hyperkeratosis, or thickening of the outer skin, and his lower limbs appeared swollen to the 1982 examiners, particularly the right foot. In a 2023 study, Verónica Catalán and colleagues examined a dark patch on the sole of his left foot. A biopsy found particles on the skin's surface compatible with dust, as well as thickening of its outer layer. Some toenails had Beau's lines, grooves formed when nail growth is interrupted. The authors proposed that whipworm infection might explain the lines, but their cause remains uncertain. They also observed marks beneath one fingernail consistent with a subungual hematoma, or blood beneath the nail.

In 2003 a third study was done, and a 3D reconstruction of the mummy was created by the Hospital Clínico de la Universidad de Chile. They were also able to determine the mummy's blood type and conduct a DNA study.

== Exhibition ==
The mummy was displayed at the Chilean National Museum of Natural History until 1982, when curators determined that a replica should replace the original to improve its long-term preservation. The Boy of El Plomo remains in the museum's care and is stored in a chamber with controlled temperature and humidity, while a replica is displayed to the public.

== See also ==
- Children of Llullaillaco
- Mummy Juanita
- Ötzi the Iceman
