= Constanza Ceruti =

Argentine anthropologist

- Born: 11 January 1973 (age 53); Buenos Aires
- Education: National University of Cuyo
- Known for: First woman high-altitude archaeologist
- Awards: Golden Condor Honoris Causa
- Scientific career
- Workplaces: Institute of High Mountain Investigations, Catholic University of Salta

External videos
- "María Constanza Ceruti: Sacred Mountains and the Discovery of Inca Mummies", March 7, 2017, ASU Hispanic Research Center
- "Love Your Mummy", Constanza Ceruti and Johan Reinhard discover Incan mummies, National Geographic

María Constanza Ceruti (born 11 January 1973 in Buenos Aires, Argentina) is an Argentine anthropologist and mountaineer, who has done more than 80 field surveys, most of them as part of National Geographic teams in Andean regions of Argentina, Chile, Bolivia, Ecuador and Peru. Her most important findings are the Children of Llullaillaco, considered the best preserved mummies in the world by the Guinness World Records. She is also the first woman worldwide to specialize in high-altitude archaeology, studying Inca ceremonial centers on the summits of Andean peaks above 6000 meters. She is a pioneer in the anthropological study of sacred mountains around the world, and in the emerging field of glacial archaeology.

She is a scientific researcher in the National Scientific and Technical Research Council (CONICET) of Argentina, founder and director pro bono of the Institute of High Mountain Research and a professor of Inca Archaeology at the Catholic University of Salta (UCASAL).

Ceruti is the first woman to specialise in the field of high-altitude archaeology. As an archaeologist, she has excavated Inca Empire ceremonial centers on the summits of the Andes. As an anthropologist, she has been studying hundreds of sacred mountains in diverse parts of the world, looking at their role in religion, mythology, folklore, identity and tourism.

She has done more than 80 field surveys, many with National Geographic teams in Argentina, Chile, Bolivia, Ecuador and Peru. Much of her research takes place on sites that have never been explored before.

She has conducted research on sacred mountains and the world´s religions in the Nepal Himalayas, India, Thailand, Australia, New Zealand, Hawai, Egypt, Morocco, Turkey, Greece, Croacia, Norway, Italy, France, Spain, Ireland, Scotland, England, Greenland, Canada, Alaska, United States, Mexico, Costa Rica, Ecuador, Brazil, Peru and Chile. Her work has a significant impact in many areas of research.

== Education ==
Born in the city of Buenos Aires on 11 January 1973, Constanza Ceruti studied at the University of Buenos Aires, graduating with the university's Gold Medal and a degree in anthropology in 1996. In October 2001 she earned her doctorate cum laude at the National University of Cuyo, the first person to specialize in high altitude archeology.

== Career ==
Ceruti is a Professor of Incan Archaeology at the Catholic University of Salta (UCASAL), as well as the founder and ad-honorem director of the Institute of High Mountain Investigations of the Catholic University of Salta. She is also a researcher of the National Council for Scientific Research in Argentina (CONICET)., and member of the National Academy of Sciences of Buenos Aires (ANCBA), the Argentina Society of Anthropology (Sociedad Argentina de Antropologia), the Association of Professional Archaeologists of Argentina (Colegio de Graduados de Antropología), the Society for American Archaeology, The Explorers Club in New York, and the Society of Woman Geographers.

She has climbed more than a hundred mountains reaching above 5,000 m (16,404 ft) during her research. Her most important ascents include the Aconcagua at 6,962 m (22,841 ft) in 1996 and 1997, the Pissis volcano at 6,792 m (22,283 ft), the Llullaillaco volcano in 1999, the Cerro Meléndez at 6,020 m (19,751 ft) in 1998 the snow-capped Cachi 5,896 m (19,344 ft) in 1996 and 1997 and Quehuar in 1996 and 1999.

She has published 25 books, four of them on High Mountain archaeology in the Andes, and more than 100 scientific papers.

== Research ==
The work Ceruti does at high altitudes is exceptionally dangerous.

The ascent of high mountains demands considerable physical resistance, since the marching days are usually very long (sometimes more than twenty hours), on steep terrain and in extreme weather conditions. ... The high mountain environment is characterized by oxygen shortage, low atmospheric pressure, strong icy winds, snowfall and thunderstorms. The extreme cold freezes the batteries in the cameras and fingertips in a few seconds ... the wind flies from the pages of the notebook to the tents themselves ... the lack of oxygen affects the concentration and performance of the brain with decreases up to 50%, while the archaeologist's work requires a lot of concentration. -- Constanza Ceruti, translation from Spanish

In 1998 Ceruti performed an archaeological excavation at an altitude of more than 5,800 m (19,029 ft) with Johan Reinhard on the higher slopes of the active volcano Misti near Arequipa, Peru. The remains of six human sacrifices, older than 500 years of antiquity, were examined.

In 1999, Ceruti co-led four archaeological expeditions with Johan Reinhard in the Andes mountains. The first involved an ascent of Nevado Quehuar at 6,100 m (20,013 ft). There, investigators recovered the remains of a mummified child, whose gravesite had been blasted open with dynamite and looted of ceremonial objects by treasure hunters. Researchers carefully salvaged the pieces of the body, which had been left scattered on the mountaintop.

=== Children of Llullaillaco ===
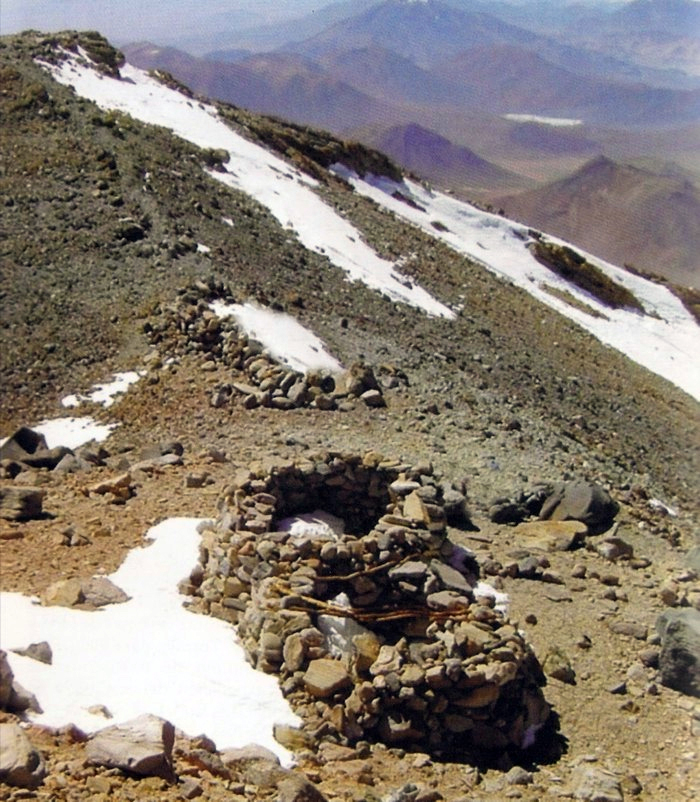
Archeological site at the top of Llullaillaco

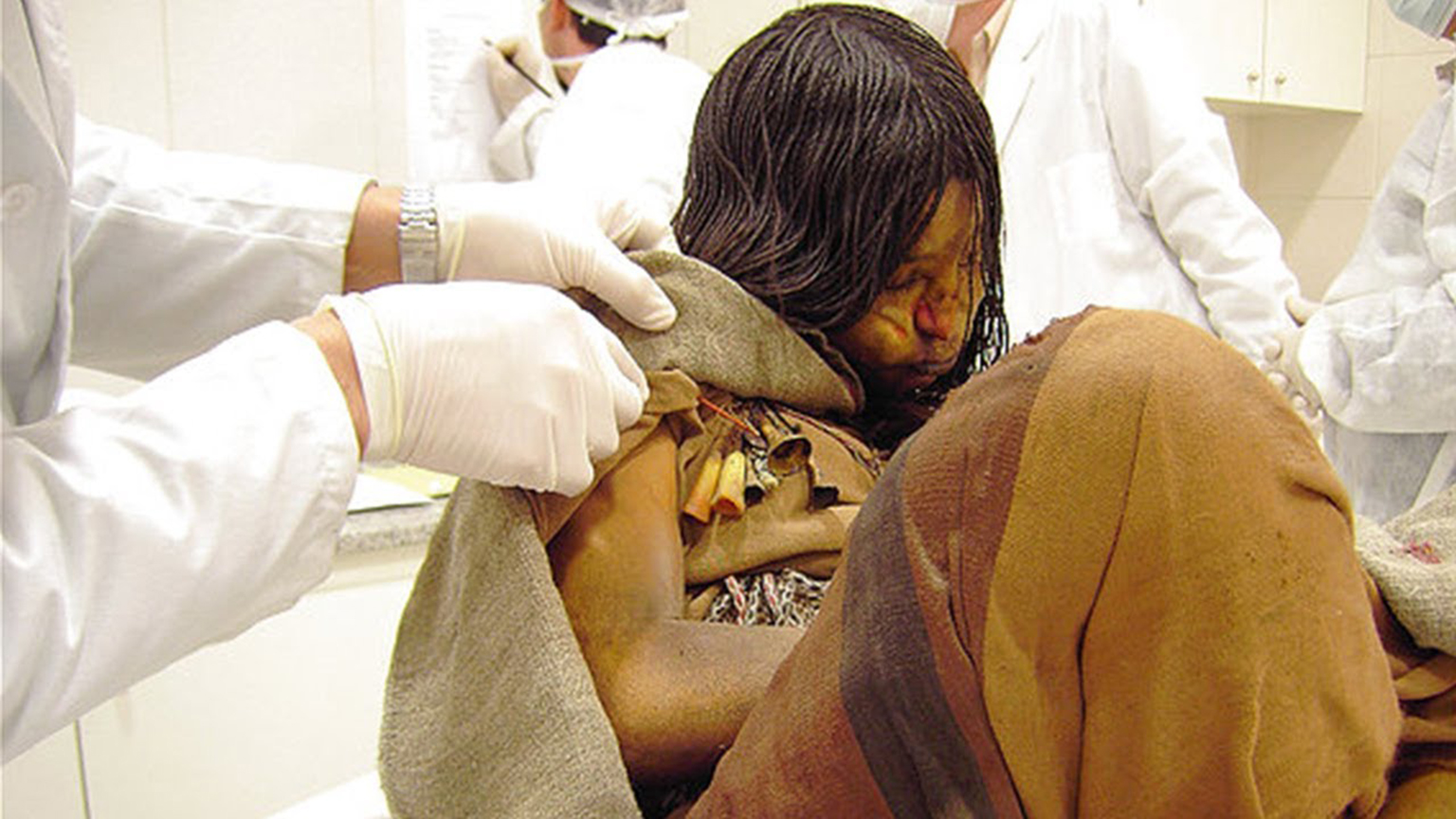
One of the Children of Llullaillaco

A few weeks later, Ceruti, Reinhard, and a team from National Geographic ascended the Llullaillaco volcano in the Argentine province of Salta. Llullaillaco is the highest archaeological site in the world at 6,739 m (22,110 ft). During an extended high-altitude excavation period, they found and studied the intact mummies of three Incan children, a boy and two girls. The bodies were accompanied by dozens of sumptuous objects of typical Inca style, including ceramic vessels, wooden cups, woven bags, spondylus shells, sandals, moccasins, clothing, jewellery, and female figurine miniatures. These mummies are considered some of the best-preserved mummies of the world. The Museum of High Mountain Archeology of Salta (MAAM) has been built to provide a home for them.

For six years, Ceruti and others at UCASAL scientifically studied the mummified bodies of the three Inca children of Llullaillaco in an international collaboration. They were able to determine the general lifestyle, ages, and causes of death of the children. The youngest, a girl, died at age six of pulmonary oedema as a result of the high altitude. After her death, her mummy was struck by lightning. The second youngest, a boy, died at age seven due to exposure to cold. The oldest, a fifteen-year-old girl, also died of exposure. DNA analysis showed that they were not related. Ceruti's notes from the original sites, painstakingly compiled under extreme conditions, have enabled researchers to better understand the ceremonial and political implications of the capacocha ritual.

The children were in good health before their deaths, and had not suffered from malnutrition, which suggested they were from high-status families. Analysis of their hair revealed that all three had eaten an enriched corn-based diet during their last year of life, including coca leaves, which can be eaten to counteract high-altitude sickness. Their clothing and artefacts indicate that they came originally from Cuzco, Peru, thousands of miles away, requiring a journey of months to reach the high Andes where they died.

Her discovery is narrated in her biography written by Gloria Lisé Donde el cielo besa la tierra Biografía de Constanza Ceruti la Arqueóloga de Alta Montaña que descubrió las Momias del Llullaillaco.

=== Pucará de Tilcara ===
After receiving her doctorate in 2001, Ceruti lived for five years in an adobe house near Pucará de Tilcara, Pucará de Tilcara is a fortification built around the twelfth century A.D. by ancestors of the Omaguaca people. By the fourteenth century, it was an important administrative, military and religious centre. The area was conquered by the Incas, and a few decades later by the Spanish, who arrived in 1536. People continue to make pilgrimages from the village to nearby mountain shrines. Living there enabled Ceruti to become deeply aware of village life and its connections to pre-Incan and Incan traditions.

== Bibliography ==
=== Published books ===
- 2019, Montañas Sagradas de Noruega. Mundo Editorial. Salta. Noviembre 2019. ISBN 978-987-698-256-6
- 2018, Montañas Sagradas de los Pirineos. Mundo Editorial. Salta. ISBN 978-987-698-245-0
- 2017, Montañas Sagradas de Escocia. Mundo Editorial. Salta. ISBN 978-987-698-194-1
- 2016, Procesiones andinas en alta montaña. Peregrinaje a cerros sagrados del norte de Argentina y el sur de Perú. EUCASA. Salta. ISBN 978-950-623-097-5
- 2016, Sacred Mountains in the Canary Islands. Mundo Editorial. Salta. ISBN 978-987-698-086-9
- 2016, Montañas Sagradas de Irlanda. Mundo Editorial. Salta. ISBN 978-987-698-148-4
- 2016, Sacred Mountains in Australia. Mundo Editorial. Salta. ISBN 978-987-698-149-1
- 2016, Montañas Místicas: poemas y vivencias de una mujer andinista. Mundo Editorial. Salta. ISBN 978-987-698-141-5
- 2015, El Camino de Santiago y las Montañas Sagradas de Galicia. Mundo Editorial. Salta. ISBN 978-987-698-086-9 Enero 2015. 138 páginas.
- 2015, Volcanes Sagrados en Costa Rica. Mundo Editorial. Salta. ISBN 978-987-698-084-5
- 2015, Montañas Sagradas en el País Vasco. Mundo Editorial. Salta ISBN 978-987-698-085-2
- 2015, Llullaillaco: Sacrificios y Ofrendas en un Santuario Inca de Alta Montaña. Mundo Editorial. Salta. ISBN 978-987-698-114-9
- 2014, Embajadores del Pasado: los niños del Llullaillaco y otras momias del mundo. Mundo Editorial. Salta. ISBN 978-987-698-081-4
- 2014, Volcanes Sagrados en Isla de Pascua. Mundo Editorial. Salta. ISBN 978-987-698-077-7
- 2014, Seasons of the Heart, Landscapes of the Soul. Mundo Editorial. Salta. ISBN 978-987-698-065-4
- 2014, Montañas Sagradas de Tailandia. Mundo Editorial. Salta ISBN 978-987-698-053-1
- 2014, El Monte Santo del Padre Pío. En las alturas del Gargano. Mundo Editorial. Salta. ISBN 978-987-698-052-4
- 2004, Arqueología de Alta Montaña en La Rioja. Ediciones de la Universidad Católica de Salta. Salta.
- 2003, Llullaillaco: Sacrificios y Ofrendas en un Santuario Inca de Alta Montaña. Publicación del Instituto de Investigaciones de Alta Montaña. Ediciones de la Universidad Católica de Salta. Salta.
- 1999, Cumbres Sagradas del Nororeste Argentino. Editorial de la Universidad de Buenos Aires (EUDEBA). Buenos Aires.
- 1997, Arqueología de Alta Montaña. Editorial Milor. Salta.

=== In collaboration ===
- 2011, Reinhard, Johan and Maria Constanza Ceruti Inca Rituals and Sacred Mountains: a study of the world ́s highest archaeological sites. Cotsen Institute of Archaeology. UCLA. Los Ángeles

=== Recent papers ===
- 2018. De momias y sacrificios infantiles: consideraciones para una arqueología de la niñez en Sudamérica. Revista de Arqueología. Vol. 31 (2): 118-133.
- 2018. Sasso della Croce: montaña sagrada y religiosidad ladina en las Dolomitas de Val Badia (Alto Adige, Italia). Mitológicas XXXIII: 35-50. Centro Argentino de Etnología Americana.
- 2018. De la colina de Wawel a los Altos Tatras: patrimonio, turismo y dimensión sagrada de la montaña en Malopolska (Polonia). Cuadernos Universitarios 11: 95-114. EUCASA. Salta.
- 2017/ 2016. Inca mountaintop shrines and glaciers in the High Andes. Journal of Glacial Archaeology Nro. 3 (1): 59-78. Equinox Publishers.
- 2017. Contribuciones a los estudios antropológicos de monta ñas sagradas y a la arqueología de altura en Argentina y el mundo. Conference at the National Academy of Sciences in Buenos Aires (ANCBA).
- 2017. La Madonnina del Gran Paradiso: alta montaña y patrimonio religioso en la cima de un gigante de los Alpes. Revista Estudios del Patrimonio Cultural Nro. 16: 6-20. España.
- 2017. Bonifacio Roero: primer alpinista religioso en la historia europea. Boletín del Centro de Estudios Genealógicos de Salta Nro. 11:271-289. Centro de Investigaciones Genealógicas de Salta. Salta.
- 2017. El macizo Catinaccio y el lago de Antermoia: montañas sagradas y mitología ladina en las Dolomitas de Val di Fassa (Alpes del noreste de italia). Scripta Ethnológica XXXIX: 67-85. Centro Argentino de Etnología Americana. Buenos Aires.
- 2016. Los Museos de Montaña de Reinhold Messner: Identidad, Turismo y Sustentabilidad en los Alpes de Sud Tirol. Journal of Sustainability Education. Vol 11. Pp. 27. February 2016.
- 2016. Yellowstone: paisaje y patrimonio. Revista Estudios del Patrimonio Cultural 15: 40-55. España.
- 2016 Los Walsers del Monte Rosa y los carnavales a orillas del lago Bodensee: influencias de ritos y creencias alpinos en la peregrinación andina de Qoyllur Rit ́i. Revista Haucaypata Nro. 11: 14-27. Lima.
- 2015. Frozen Mummies from Andean Mountaintop Shrines: Bioarchaeology and Ethnohistory of Inca Human Sacrifice. Journal of Biomedical Research International. Volume 2015. Article ID 439428. 12 pages. Hindawi.
- 2015. Nuestra Señora de las Nieves del Monte Zerbion, una devoción mariana en los Alpes. Boletín del Museo Regional de Atacama. Volumen VI Nro. 6:71-81. Copiapó.

== Awards and honours ==
- 1997, Mountaineer of the Year (Montañista del Año)
- 5 August 2000, the Argentine Army awarded Ceruti its highest mountain distinction, the Golden Condor Honoris Causa ("Cóndor Dorado Honoris Causa of the Ejército Argentino") for her high altitude experience with over 100 ascents above 5,000 m (16,404 ft). It was the first time it was awarded to a woman.
- 2005, Emerging Explorer, National Geographic Society
- 2006, Prince of Asturias Award in the Communication and Humanities category, received on behalf of the National Geographic Society by Ceruti, John Fahey, Reza Deghati (Iran), Enric Sala (Spain) and Michael Fay (USA)
- 2007, WINGS Women of Discovery Award for Courage
- 2008, Academic Vocation Award (Vocación Académica), National Conference on Vocation, Training and Employment in the Argentine Republic
- 2010, Woman of the Year (Mujer Destacada de Salta), Salta
- 2011, Silver Clover Award (Trébol de Plata), Rotary Club of Buenos Aires
- 2014, Honorary Doctorate in Humanities, Moravian College, Pennsylvania
- 2017, Gold Medal award of the International Society of Woman Geographers (ISWG)
- 2019, Member of the National Academy of Sciences of Buenos Aires (ANCBA)
- 2026, Konex Award in Anthropology, Argentina.
