= Catholic University of Santa María =

Private University in Peru

Coordinates: 16.4062°S 71.5476°W

Catholic University of Santa María (UCSM)
- Universidad Católica de Santa María
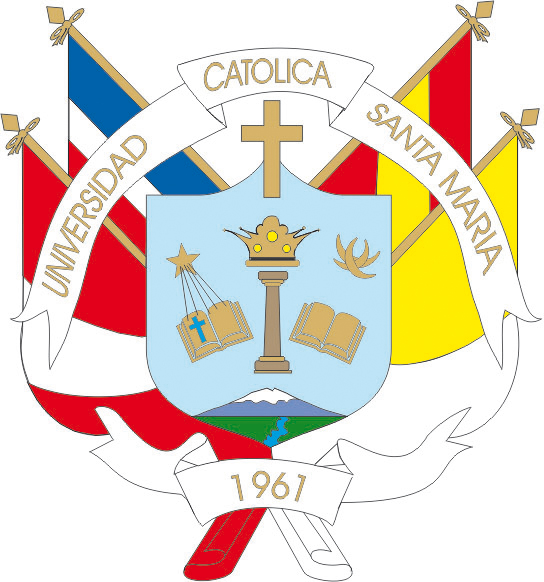
- Motto: In the professional and academic excellence
- Type: Private, general
- Established: 6 December 1961
- Rector: Dr. Manuel Alberto Briceño Ortega
- Location: Arequipa, Peru
- Website: www.ucsm.edu.pe

The Catholic University of Santa María (UCSM) (Spanish: Universidad Católica de Santa María) is a local private University in Arequipa, Peru, and has been in continuous operation since it was founded on 6 December 1961. It was founded by William Daniel Morris Christy, an American priest from St. Louis, Missouri.

The University first came to the attention of various archaeological research teams after the American archaeologist, Dr. Johan Reinhard, discovered in 1995, the body of a 500-year-old Inca mummy later named "Juanita" on the top of Mount Ampato near Arequipa. The mummy was later brought to the University for further research and is currently encased in a special glass box and kept at constant cold temperatures to conserve her body.

== Founding ==
The Catholic University of Santa Maria was founded by William Daniel Morris Christy, who was born on 4 November 1910 in St. Louis, Missouri. He founded the university on 6 December 1961.

It is the second oldest private university in Peru, after the Catholic University of Lima (Today PUCP).

USCM Radio has been broadcasting since 1999.

== See also ==
- List of universities in Peru
- Yonhy Lescano

== Sources ==
- "Fundador" [Founder] (in Spanish). UCSM. Archived from the original on 5 April 2016. "William Daniel Morris Christy"
- "History and general reference" (in Spanish). UCSM. Archived from the original on 21 December 2009.
