= Museum of High Altitude Archaeology =

- Museo de Arqueología de Alta Montaña (Spanish)

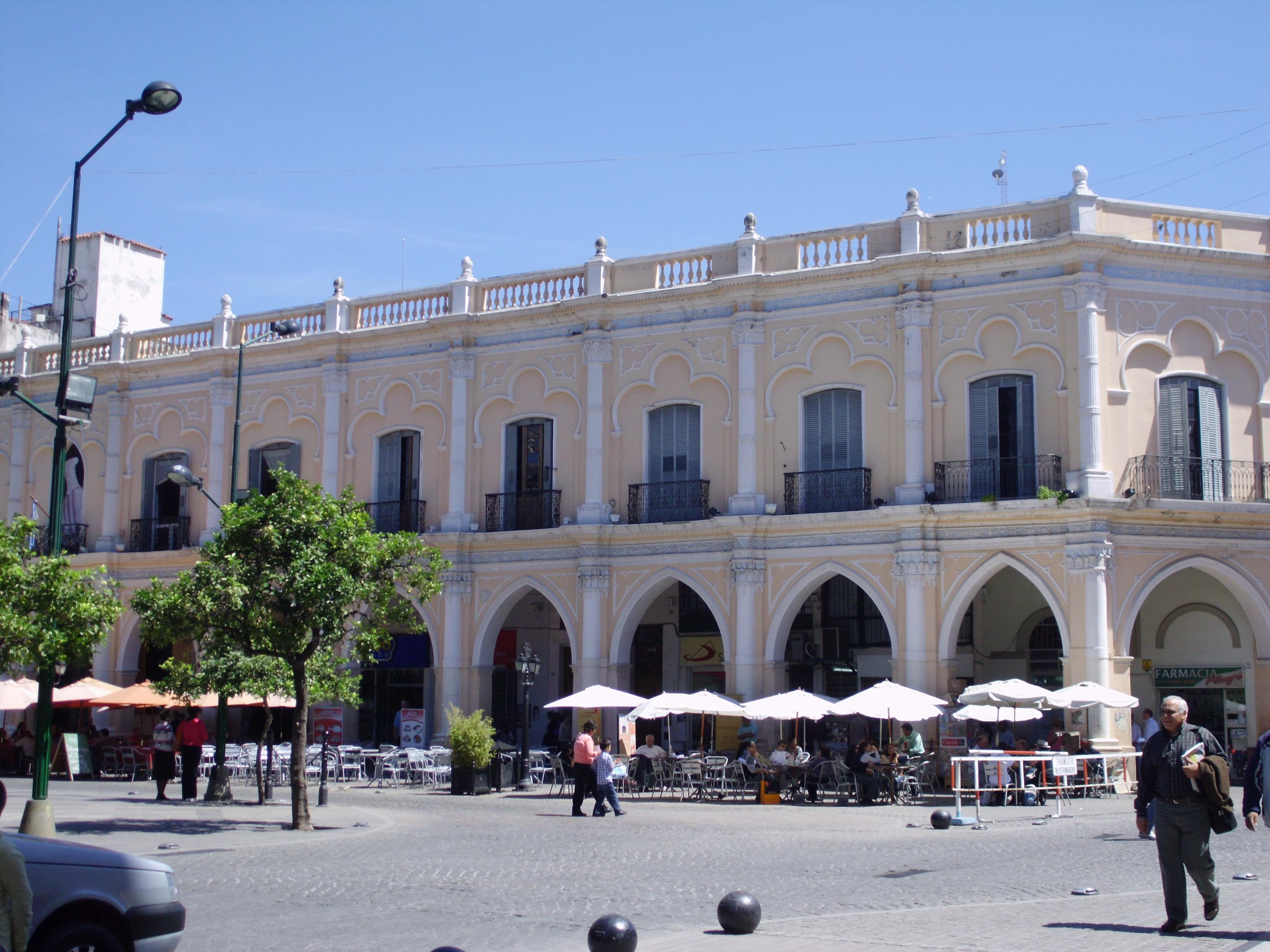
- Interactive fullscreen map
- Established: 19 November 2004
- Location: Salta, Argentina
- Coordinates: 24°47′20″S 65°24′40″W
- Type: Archaeology museum
- Key holdings: Children of Llullaillaco
- Owner: Government of Salta Province
- Website: maam.gob.ar

The Museum of High Altitude Archaeology (Spanish Museo de Arqueología de Alta Montaña; MAAM) is an archaeology museum located in the historical center of Salta, Argentina, which conserves and exhibits collections related to the Capacocha child sacrifice ceremonies performed by the Inca in the high peaks of the Andes, mainly the Children of Llullaillaco mummies discovered in 1999 at the top of the Llullaillaco volcano. Inaugurated in 2004, the museum was specially created by the government of Salta Province to preserve and display the Llullaillaco findings, and during its first years it exhibited only a few artifacts, as it had to develop a unique exhibition system to correctly display and preserve the mummies that would not be completed until 2007.

In 2005, the MAAM expanded its holdings with the donation of the Teruel collection, composed of various objects and skeletal remains discovered on the finca of the Teruel family of Salta in the department of San Carlos in the 1980s. The following year, the mummy known as Reina del Cerro (Spanish for "Queen of the Hill") and its accompanying objects were donated to the museum, whose sanctuary on the Chuscha hill was discovered and looted in the 1920s and passed through various private collections in a neglected manner for decades. In addition to exhibiting and preserving, the museum also carries out various educational and scientific research projects.

In its 20 years of existence, the MAAM has positioned itself as one of the most important spaces for the cultural and tourist development of Salta, with an important influx of local and foreign visitors. In 2024, it became the highest rated museum in all of Argentina on the Tripadvisor platform, and has received the company's Traveller Choice award that year and also previously in 2021 and 2022. However, since its founding, the museum has received numerous criticisms from local indigenous groups, who denounce the unconsulted removal and exhibition of the children as a desecration as well as a violation of indigenous rights.

== See also ==
- List of museums in Argentina
