= Mummy Juanita =

Mummified Inca girl sacrifice

Juanita
- Juanita before the unwrapping of her burial bundle
- Born: Unknown; Inca Empire
- Died: c. 1440–1480 (aged 12-15); Mount Ampato, Peru
- Body discovered: September 1995; Mount Ampato, Peru
- Resting place: Museo Santuarios Andinos, Arequipa, Peru
- Other names: Lady of Ampato; Ice Maiden; Momia Juanita
- Known for: Exceptionally preserved Inca child mummy recovered from Mount Ampato

Juanita, also known as the Lady of Ampato and the Ice Maiden, is the exceptionally well-preserved frozen body of an Inca girl who was sacrificed in a capacocha ritual between about 1440 and 1480 CE, when she was approximately 12–15 years old. Discovered in 1995 on Mount Ampato in southern Peru, her body was preserved by freezing temperatures at high altitude, making her one of the best-preserved Andean mummies ever found.

Juanita was discovered by anthropologist Johan Reinhard and Peruvian mountaineer Miguel Zárate after melting ice and erosion exposed and displaced her burial bundle. The survival of her soft tissues, internal organs, hair, skin, blood, and stomach contents has allowed researchers to investigate her health, genetic ancestry, diet, injuries, and cause of death in unusual detail. These studies have provided evidence about Inca religion, high-altitude ceremonial practices, and the treatment of children selected for sacrifice.

Since 1996, Juanita has been exhibited almost continuously at the Museo Santuarios Andinos of the Catholic University of Santa María in Arequipa, Peru. She was exhibited at the headquarters of the National Geographic Society in Washington, D.C., in 1996 and in Japan in 1999. In 1995, Time named her discovery one of the world's ten most important discoveries of the year, and in 2020 Peru's Ministry of Culture designated her remains a movable cultural heritage object.

== Discovery ==
The girl who became known as Juanita was discovered in September 1995 during an ascent of Mount Ampato, a 6,300 m; 20,700 ft volcano in the Andes of southern Peru. While investigating an Inca ceremonial site near the summit, anthropologist Johan Reinhard and Peruvian mountaineer Miguel Zárate found a burial bundle in a crater below. Ice melt and erosion had exposed the site, causing the bundle to fall from its original location on the mountain.

The bundle contained the frozen body of a young girl. Juanita's remains and the objects buried with her were transported to Arequipa, Peru, to prevent thawing during conservation and study.

The discovery led to further archaeological investigations on Mount Ampato. In October 1995, an expedition led by Reinhard and Peruvian archaeologist José Antonio Chávez recovered two additional frozen child mummies, a girl and a boy. A third female mummy was recovered from the mountain in December 1997.

== Condition and preservation ==
Juanita was discovered almost entirely frozen on Mount Ampato. Freezing temperatures at high altitude preserved her body in exceptional condition, including her internal organs, hair, blood, skin, and stomach contents.

Unlike many archaeological human remains, Juanita was preserved primarily by freezing rather than desiccation. The survival of soft tissues and internal organs allowed researchers to study her diet, health, genetic ancestry, and injuries in unusual detail. Because of the condition of her remains, Juanita has been described as one of the best-preserved mummies from the Andes.

== Associated objects and clothing ==
Juanita was buried with a collection of grave goods that included llama bones, pottery, maize, miniature figurines, and Spondylus shells. Many of these objects were scattered down the mountainside after the burial bundle was displaced by ice melt and erosion. Spondylus shells, obtained from the Pacific coast of present-day Ecuador, were highly valued in the Inca Empire and have been associated with rain ceremonies and other ritual offerings.

Juanita was wrapped in a brightly coloured burial tapestry (aksu) and wore an alpaca wool shawl fastened with a silver clasp and a headdress made from the feathers of a red macaw, a bird native to the Amazon basin. Her garments resembled the fine textiles worn by the elite of Cusco, the Inca capital, leading archaeologists to suggest that she may have belonged to a noble Cusco family. Her burial also contained bowls, pins, and miniature figurines made of gold, silver, and shell.

== Scientific analysis ==
Juanita's body was transported to Johns Hopkins Hospital in the United States in 1996, where researchers conducted computed tomography (CT) scans and other non-destructive examinations of her remains.

Genetic testing conducted by the Institute for Genomic Research (TIGR) found that Juanita belonged to a maternal lineage common among Indigenous peoples of the Americas. Researchers identified her mitochondrial DNA as belonging to haplogroup A2, one of the major Native American mitochondrial haplogroups. Early comparisons suggested similarities with the Ngäbe people of Panama, although later research found genetic patterns more consistent with populations from the Andes.

Researchers also identified a unique genetic sequence within Hypervariable Region 2 (HV2) that was not present in the mitochondrial DNA databases available at the time of the study. Her reported mitochondrial haplotype is 16111T, 16223T, 16290T, and 16319A.

== Sacrifice and death ==
Juanita is believed to have been sacrificed between 1440 and 1480 CE as part of a capacocha (qhapaq hucha) ceremony, a major ritual of the Inca Empire that often involved the sacrifice of children at sacred sites. Children selected for sacrifice were regarded as ritually pure and could be brought from across the empire to Cusco, the Inca capital, before undertaking journeys to mountain shrines where the sacrifices took place.

Juanita was sacrificed on Mount Ampato in the Andes of southern Peru, one of several high mountains used by the Inca for ceremonial offerings. Archaeologist Johan Reinhard has suggested that the sacrifices carried out on Ampato may have been connected to drought conditions, volcanic eruptions, or both, because such events threatened local water supplies and grazing lands. The nearby Misti and Sabancaya volcanoes erupted during the 15th century, and archaeologist José Antonio Chávez Chávez has linked these eruptions to the sacrificial offerings found on Ampato. Other researchers have interpreted capacocha as a political practice that helped reinforce imperial authority across the expanding Inca Empire.

Archaeological and biochemical studies of Inca child sacrifice indicate that coca and chicha were commonly used in capacocha rituals. Isotopic analyses of other capacocha victims suggest that selected children often experienced significant dietary changes before sacrifice, including increased consumption of maize and animal protein, foods associated with elite status. Analysis of Juanita's stomach contents indicates that she consumed a meal of vegetables approximately six to eight hours before her death.

Scientific examination of Juanita's remains indicates that she died from a forceful blow to the head. Radiologist Elliot K. Fishman identified a fractured right eye socket and a skull fracture measuring approximately 5 cm (2.0 in), injuries that caused severe bleeding within the skull. Blunt-force trauma was one of several methods used in Inca child sacrifice, alongside strangulation and suffocation.

== Reconstruction ==
Nearly three decades after her discovery, a forensic facial reconstruction created by Swedish archaeologist and sculptor Oscar Nilsson was unveiled in Arequipa in 2023. Using scans of Juanita's skull, DNA evidence, and other anthropological data, the reconstruction produced a life-sized depiction of how she may have appeared during her lifetime.

== Exhibition ==
After her discovery in 1995, Juanita's remains were taken to Arequipa, Peru, where they were conserved before being placed on public display. Since 1996, she has been exhibited almost continuously at the Museo Santuarios Andinos (Museum of Andean Sanctuaries) at the Catholic University of Santa María.

Between May and June 1996, Juanita was exhibited at the headquarters of the National Geographic Society in Washington, D.C., in a specially designed climate-controlled display. In 1999, Juanita was exhibited in Japan.

In 2020, Peru's Ministry of Culture designated Juanita a movable cultural heritage object.

== Legacy ==
Shortly after her discovery, Time magazine named Juanita one of the world's ten most important discoveries of 1995. The discovery was also the subject of a feature article in the June 1996 issue of National Geographic.

== See also ==
- Children of Llullaillaco
- Chinchorro mummies
- Inca Mummy Girl
- List of unsolved murders (before 1900)
- Ötzi, also known as The Iceman
- Siberian Ice Maiden
- Plomo Mummy
