= Aclla =

Inca women who performed rituals

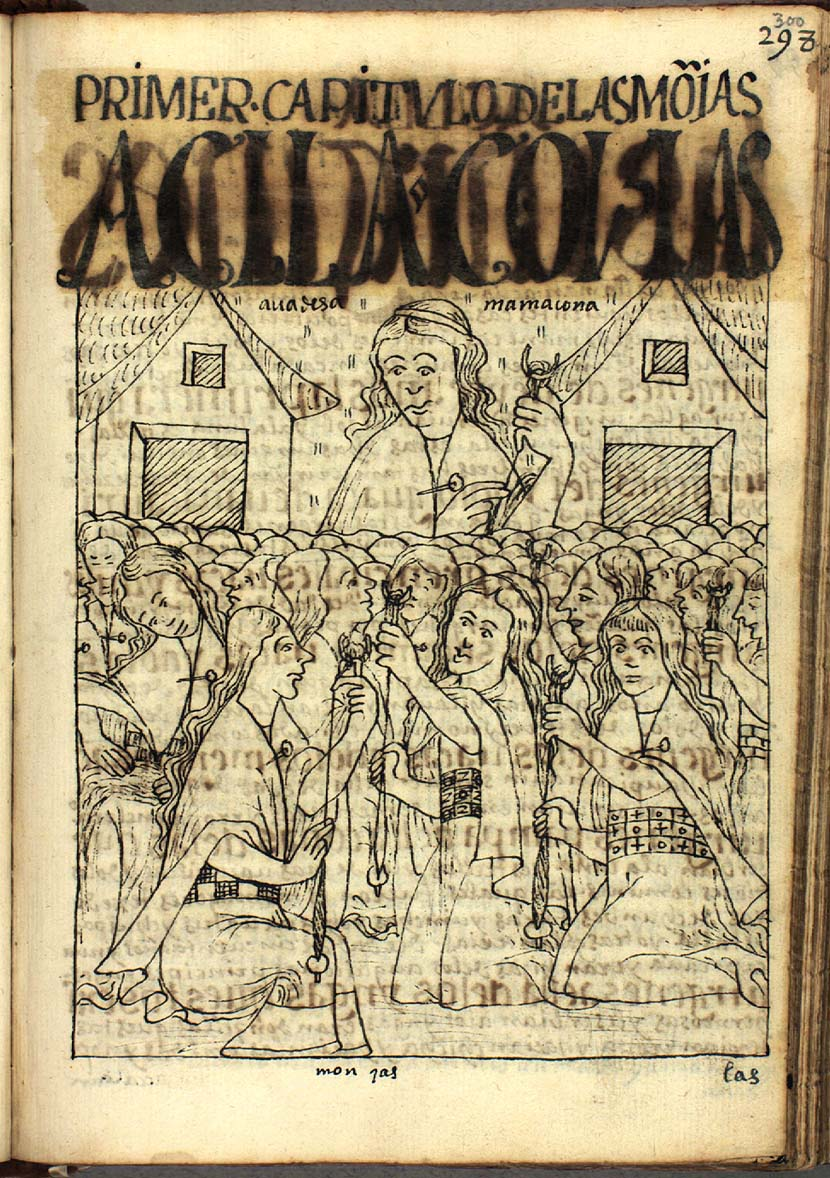
Acllas in the manuscript of Guamán Poma of 1615.

Aclla (Quechua: aklla), also called Chosen Women, Virgins of the Sun, and Wives of the Inca, were sequestered women in the Inca Empire. They were virgins, chosen at about age 10. They performed several services. They were given in marriage to men who had distinguished themselves in service to the empire; they produced luxury items, weaving fine cloth, preparing ritual food, and brewing the chicha (beer) drunk at religious festivals; and some, the most "perfect", were selected as human sacrifices for religious rites. Others lived out their lives in a monastic environment.

== Selection and training ==
The Inca Empire (1438-1533) created, or adopted from earlier cultures, several institutions to manage the labor of the people in the territory it ruled. Among the institutions were the mit'a, the yanakuna, and the aclla.

Each year the Inca government sent out representatives, called apupanaca, to collect girls eight to ten years old from the provinces as tribute for the state. The girls selected were mostly from the higher social classes, frequently coming from the families of non-Inca provincial leaders of the kuraka class. They were chosen based on their beauty, skills, and intelligence and were sent for training in provincial centers to live together in complexes of buildings called acllawasi (house of the chosen women) which might have up to 200 women in residence. Only the highest status individuals were sent to Cuzco for their training.

The girls were trained for about four years in religion, spinning and weaving, preparation of food, and brewing chicha. They then became mamakuna (priestesses) and were married to prominent men or assigned to religious duties. The most skilled and physically perfect were sent to Cuzco, the capital of the empire, and might become secondary wives or concubines of the Inca emperor and other noblemen. A few were destined to be sacrificed in a religious ceremony called capacocha. Several archaeological contexts for aclla have been identified, specifically at Huánuco Pampa. Their status and function in society is sometimes compared to a similar role that men occupied called the yanakuna.

== Service ==
Acllas were a diverse group in terms of their functionality in Inca society. The general understanding of acllas' societal role is that they were split into two groups: those who were involved with religious rituals and those who were given to men as wives. Within these roles, the assignment of acllas was divided by status. Higher status acllas (those who were considered to be more beautiful, more skilled, and who came from high status families) were either sent to Cuzco in service to the sun at the Coricancha or they became secondary wives of the Inca. Lower status acllas typically stayed in their regions of origin and were placed in the service of lesser religious cults or were given as gifts to Inca nobility.

Despite the differences in where they ended up, the services they provided tended to be very similar; acllas were tasked with creating textiles, preparing food, brewing chicha for ritual consumption, and any other skills they would need to make a good wife or priestess. Their services are considered to be a foundation for Inca conceptions of hospitality. This point was made clear by the Inca Pachacuti, who ordered the creation and expansion of acllawasi for the purpose of strengthening "the generosity of the administration".

However, their labor may have even been more specialized and nuanced than this general understanding of their role. Some sources suggest that there were many different types of acllas with specific titles. These included Guayrur acllas who served the sun and moon, Uayror aclla sumacs who were dedicated to the principal huacas, and aclla chaupi catiquin sumacs who wove clothes and worked on chacras. Other sources suggest that they may have had more responsibilities than they are typically ascribed. Due to their unique position in society, they may have also had a role as scribes.

== Social significance ==
While acllas are often thought of as commodities within the empire, their influence and significance reached much further than just an item to be traded. In fact, many of them tended to benefit socially from their position as an aclla as those who were married to provincial leaders were given their own land and command over the laborers who worked the land.

The use of acllas was tied to kinship and the maintenance of hegemony within the empire. The family of a chosen aclla would be raised in social status. The acllas themselves would honour the main Inca gods and be honoured in return. Those not sacrificed at Cuzco might be returned to their own communities and be sacrificed there. This would create a ritual bond between Cuzco and the local region; Cuzco had taken a member of the local community and made them a representative of the central state. The aclla had been blessed by the Emperor and became the guardian of the local huacas. This signaled the entrance of the empire into local tradition and religion.

Acllas were an extremely important tool of statecraft for Cuzco. They figured heavily in the system of reciprocity that kept the empire running without a formal monetary economy. Redistributing women was an extremely successful way of gaining the loyalty of those who had just been conquered by the Inca because it conferred status to the families of selected women and helped to build trust between officials and locals. Their service was also essential for establishing the Inca culture across the empire. The labor that they provided in the form of textiles was used in gift giving to help form alliances and they themselves were also used as a kind of gift that helped to confer status on the recipient. Those who received an aclla as a wife also received all of the skills she could provide which allowed that person significant power. Acllas given in service for religious purposes conferred importance in a similar way because of their skills in creating the necessary means for rituals, namely the brewing of chicha that was integral to religious ceremonies. Their presence is noted at the ritual site of Huanaco Pampa, where the structures that have been excavated suggest a large presence of acllas who had access to the extensive storehouses of corn and grain to make chicha. It was important that they were present at the site because chicha could not be stored for long periods of time; it had to be made more or less on the spot.

While less common, there is some evidence that acllas were used in human sacrifice. This was tied to their role as gifts and the system of reciprocity throughout the entire empire due to their economic significance. In a ritual context, they were an extremely valuable sacrifice because they represented the capacity for so much potential wealth through the use of their skills in weaving, the brewing of chicha, and hospitality. They also represented a connection between Cuzco and the peripheral regions that it had conquered. This tying of the centre to the periphery was one of the most important aspects of the sacrifice of acllas. The story of Tanta Carhua is one such account of the process of binding the centre and the periphery together.

Colonial documents contain a record of Tanta Carhua, who was sacrificed as a capacocha in her home ayllu of Urcon. After visiting Cuzco and being honoured by the emperor, Tanta Carhua was credited with saying: "You can finish with me now because I could not be more honoured than by the feasts which they celebrated for me in Cuzco." Upon her return home, Tanta’s father became the curaca of his ayllu. Tanta was deified and her "sacrifice... ritually asserted her father's, and father's descendants', new role as a nexus between Urcon and Cuzco while dramatizing the community’s subordination to Cuzco."

== Gendered significance and misunderstandings ==
The overwhelming amount of knowledge of them suggests that a majority of them were women. This meant that they were subjected to specific rules and expectations. One of the most notable ways that they differed from not only the rest of the population but also from the yanakuna was through their role in reproduction. Acllas were required to remain celibate and failure to do so was punishable by death. This requirement was a uniquely Inca need as Andean natives did not require celibacy from women. In fact, sexual relations prior to marriage and trial marriages were encouraged. This same requirement was not placed on the yanakuna.

Related to this was their association with a kind of "holy status". However, this notion may be related too closely with a colonial understanding of their function. Many colonists were fascinated by the aclla but tended to equate them with European understandings of their function. They were often thought of as a virgin cult or a parallel to nuns. This does not accurately represent their position in their unique cultural context.

== See also ==
- Vestal Virgin
