= Capacocha =

Inca ritual of human sacrifice

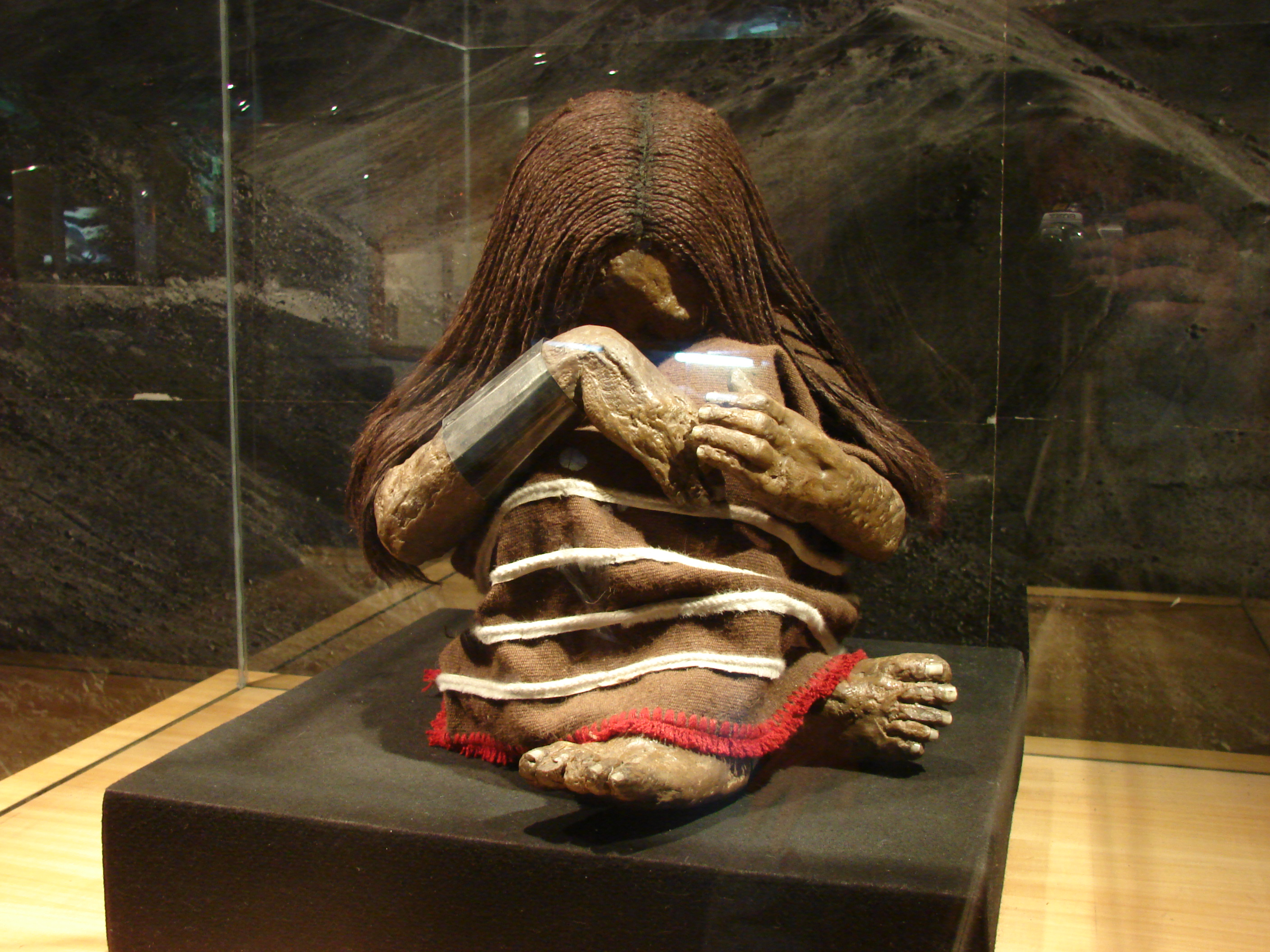
The replica of the Plomo Mummy on display at the Museo Nacional de Historia Natural in Santiago, Chile

Capacocha or Qhapaq hucha (Quechua: qhapaq 'noble, solemn, principal, mighty, royal', hucha 'crime, sin, guilt', Hispanicized spellings Capac cocha, Capaccocha, Capacocha, also qhapaq ucha) was an important sacrificial rite among the Inca that typically involved the sacrifice of children. Children of both sexes were selected from across the Inca empire for sacrifice in capacocha ceremonies, which were performed at important shrines distributed across the empire, known as huacas, or wak'akuna.

Capacocha ceremonies took place under several circumstances. Some could be undertaken as the result of key events in the life of the Sapa Inca, the Inca Emperor, such as his ascension to the throne, an illness, his death, or the birth of a son. At other times, Capacocha ceremonies were undertaken to stop natural disasters and performed in major festivals or processions at important ceremonial sites. The rationale for this type of sacrificial rite has typically been understood as the Inca trying to ensure that humanity's best were sent to join their deities.

The children chosen for sacrifice in a capacocha ceremony were typically given alcohol and coca leaves and deposited at the place of the ceremony. Sacrifice was primarily carried out through four methods: strangulation, a blow to the head, suffocation, or being buried alive while unconscious, though if the ceremony was carried out in a particularly cold place, they could die from hypothermia. Some Spanish records tell of Incas removing victims' hearts, but no evidence of this has been found in the archaeological record; it seems more likely that this practice was witnessed by the Spaniards among the Aztecs and wrongly attributed to the Incas as well.

== Ceremony ==
=== Selection of children ===
Children selected for sacrifice in capacocha ceremonies were of both sexes, and were provided to the state as tribute by local communities on a yearly basis. No region was exempt from the recruitment of these child sacrifices; they could come from any region of the empire. The male victims were no older than ten, and female victims could be up to age sixteen but must be virginal when chosen; they had to be perfect, unblemished by even a freckle or scar. The Inca believed that only the purest children were worthy enough to be sent to the gods, as in the afterlife they would function as the people's representatives. For many families it was a great honor to have one's child chosen for the ceremony, and it was often children from noble families that were sacrificed in an effort to gain political favor with the emperor.

While the boys were immediately brought to Cuzco, the young girls, called aclla, taken for sacrifice were often entrusted to the mama-kuna, in the "House of Chosen Women" (aqlla wasi). Chosen for their looks, the girls stayed at this institution for an extended period of time and were taught, under the tutelage of priestesses, how to weave, sew, and prepare special ritual beverages called chicha. The mama-kuna women were compared to nuns by many Spanish men, as they lived celibate lives, serving the gods. Typically around the age of 14 the girls would be divided into three groups. Some girls were consecrated as priestesses and went on to raise the girls brought after them, and the prettiest were often sent as tribute to be sacrificed in state capacocha ceremonies. Otherwise, the girls were offered to the emperor in Cuzco as servants or concubines; or were distributed amongst the noblemen as secondary wives.

=== Capacocha at Cuzco ===
The capacocha sacrifice started at the capital city of Cuzco, on the order of the Sapa Inca. The first Sapa Inca to do this sacrifice was Pachacuti. During the festivities of the Capacocha in Cuzco, it was decided what type and quantity of offerings each shrine or wak'a would receive, of which the Incas maintained a clear record. The tributes were fed well, and those too young to eat would have their mothers with them to breastfeed. This was to ensure that they would be well fed and happy when they prepared to reach the gods. The children were paired off, girl and boy, and dressed finely like little royals. They were paraded around four large statues, of the Creator, the Sun God, the Moon God, and the Thunder God. The Sapa Inca would then say to the priests to divide the children, along with the other sacrifices, in four, for each of the four suyu regions. He would then order the priests to make their sacrifices at their main wak'akuna.

=== Sacrifice at the wak'akuna ===
After the ceremonies at Cuzco, the children, the priests and their entourage of companions undertook the trip back to their communities. When they returned, they did not follow the royal road, or the Inca road, as they had gone, but they had to follow a path in a straight line, possibly following the ceque lines that left Cuzco and went to the wak'akuna. This was a long and tedious journey, crossing valleys, rivers and mountains, which could take months.

Once at the summit, the young victims would then be administered an intoxicating drink or other substance to either induce sleep or a stupor, ostensibly to let the final ritual go on smoothly. If the ceremony was carried out in a particularly cold place, they could die from hypothermia. In other cases, death was caused in a more violent manner. This was possibly the case with the Aconcagua child, with a strong blow to the head, as well as that of the girl at Sara Sara and the young woman from the snowy Ampato, while the cause of death of the "Queen of the Hill" was a puncture wound in the right hemithorax, which entered through her back. While in some cases, as in Llullaillaco, the bodies were deposited in a burial chamber and covered with gravel, or, in the case of Cerro El Plomo, the sacrificial victim was wrapped in a complex funerary bundle of several pieces with a specific function and message, as in the case of Aconcagua.

When the sacrifices of children and material offerings were buried, the holes could not be made using any metal, but dug out using sharpened sticks during the ceremony. Once dead, the children would then be buried in a fetal position, wrapped up in a bundle with various artifacts within the bundle or next to it in the same grave.

=== Non-human sacrifice and offerings ===
A number of offerings were often left with the sacrificed individuals at the sites of capacocha ceremonies. The human body itself was often finely dressed and clothed in a feathered headdress and other ornamentation such as a necklace or bracelet. The most elaborate artifacts were typically paired human statuettes and llama figurines that have been crafted with gold, silver, and spondylus shells. The combination of both male and female figurines alongside the use of both gold and silver was likely meant to pay tribute to the male Sun and the female Moon. Several sets of ceramics as well as gold, silver, and bronze pins were relatively commonplace too. A large amount of cloth was a typical find at capacocha sites too. Some objects that often appear such as plates and bowls have often been found in pairs. Alongside these objects are sometimes found food items. All objects, animals, and people sacrificed to a wak'a, not only represented Inca symbols but were also previously legitimized in ceremonies conducted by the emperor himself.

== Historical accounts ==
The fullest description of a capacocha comes from Cristóbal de Molina, who placed it in the context of a monarch's ascension. He wrote that all of the towns of the empire were called upon to send one or two boys and girls around 10 years of age to the capital, along with fine cloth, camelids, and figurines of gold, silver, and shell. The boys and girls were dressed in finery and matched up as if they were married couples. Priests were then dispatched to the four quarters with sacrificial items and orders to make offerings to all wak'a according to their rank. The parties left the city in straight-line paths, deviating for neither mountain nor ravine. At some point, the burdens were transferred to other porters, who continued along the route. The children who could walk would do so, while those who could not were carried by their mothers. The Inca himself traveled the royal road, as did the flocks.

Archaeologically, the evidence to support sacrifices at that scale is lacking. In his fieldwork among the wak'akuna of Cuzco, Bauer found surface evidence of human burial at three shrines, but nothing approaching the thousands of victims described in the chronicles has yet been reported. Even so, Molina's comment that the rituals paid special attention to high peaks has been supported by the archaeological finds described. The principal offerings recovered from those sites – gold, silver, spondylus shell, and children – also accurately match the priest's account.

According to Spanish chronicler Pedro Cieza de León who visited Cuzco in 1550, the chosen Virgins of the Sun god, whose task it was to weave and dye woollen cloth for the service of the temple near Cuzco and to prepare chichas, could also be buried alive (sacrificed) if they had violated their celibacy by engaging in sexual intercourse with a male. Spanish historian, Pedro Sarmiento de Gamboa, wrote that by the time of Inca Yupanqui's reign, these women were being used as his concubines.

== Cultural significance ==
In Inca culture, the dead served as link between the Inca people and the gods. Capacocha served as way to appease the gods, who otherwise might cause natural disasters like floods, earthquakes, and famines as a punishment for the people's sins. Children sacrificed in capacocha ceremonies became servants of the gods, or, in capacocha ceremonies following an emperor's death, servants to the emperor. They also served as guardians of the areas where they were sacrificed.

Children sacrificed in capacocha ceremonies were also commemorated by their home communities, or ayllukuna. Having a child sacrificed in a capacocha ceremony was also considered a great honor to the family, and parents sometimes volunteered their children for sacrifice.

== High-altitude sites ==
The Inca paid special attention to a number of ceremonial wak'a sites at very high elevations. Over 100 ceremonial centers and shrines were built within Inca territories on or near the high summits of the Andes Mountains. These sites were often meant to function both religiously and politically. Some mountains were viewed as origin places or the home to important mountain deities. Building shrines on these mountains both paid homage to the deities and also placed an imperial stamp on areas important to local beliefs, fulfilling both religious and political goals. In a number of instances, typically at the most important of these mountains, these sites contain the mummified remains of children sacrificed in capacocha ceremonies. Capacocha ceremonies at these important locations held a great deal of weight. Inca priests would periodically visit wak'a distributed across the Inca realm and certificate if they still maintained its power or had lost it, on occasions destroying the discredited wak'a.

Travel to these sites would have involved a procession of priests, the children who would be sacrificed, and a number of other important individuals throughout the empire. Different peoples would assist with the procession as the group moved throughout the different regions of the empire. These sites were difficult to reach and even more difficult to work on. In order to increase the ease with which these mountaintop locations could be reached, the Incas built staging stations lower on the mountains and also made paths that lead up to the summit. Some preparation would likely have occurred at tambos (Quechua: tampukuna) situated nearby.

=== Llullaillaco ===
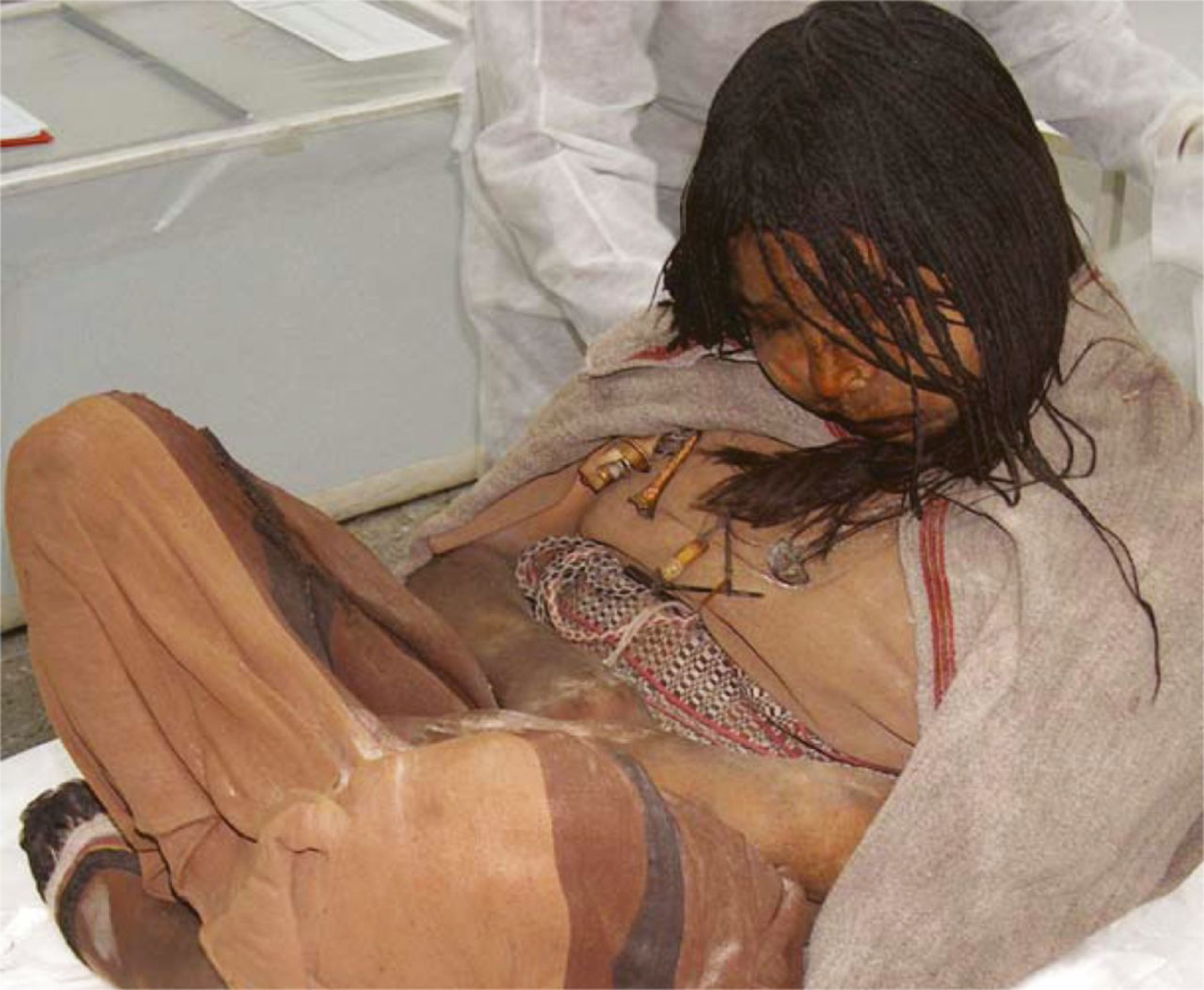
One of the mummies recovered from Llullaillaco.

One particularly noteworthy site was found near the summit of Mount Llullaillaco, a volcano in Argentina that lies near the Chilean border. This mountain appears to have been the site of the conclusion of a capacocha ceremony, taking place at an elevation of around 6,739 meters above sea level. In 1999, the mummies of three relatively young individuals were found at the top of the mountain alongside a diverse assemblage of artifacts. Excavations around the main ceremonial structure, a rectangular platform, revealed the burials of a young girl of about 14 years of age, a girl of about 6 years of age, and a boy of about 7 years of age along with over 100 offerings of various materials. Due to the frigid conditions, both the mummies and the materials were well preserved. Some of the notable artifacts found at the site include a feathered headdress, well-made clothing, a number of ceramics, bowls and spoons made of wood, various food items, figurines made out of gold, silver, and spondylus, and other metal objects such as pins.

Due to the preservation of the children, a number of studies could be undertaken from their remains. Hair samples indicate that the diets of the children underwent a momentous change in the year before their deaths. This helps to indicate the care with which children were treated during their travels throughout the empire prior to their ultimate sacrifice. Other changes in the isotopes found in the hair samples indicate that the children began their procession to the mountain several months prior to their death.

=== Quehuar ===
Another noteworthy capacocha site is present near the summit of the extinct Quehuar volcano, reaching an altitude of 6,130 meters in northwestern Argentina. At the top of the mountain is a raised ceremonial platform, or ushnu, attached to a frontal ramp near a circular walled structure. Various offerings and a sacrificial victim were found contained within the walled structure. However, prior to archeological excavation, the platform, the walled structure, and its contents had been damaged by looters with dynamite. Through DNA and x-ray long bone analysis the body was identified as the remains of an approximately 12-year-old female. However, partial destruction of the body by dynamite made it impossible to determine her cause of death. It is believed that the sacrificial victim was buried with the clothing she wore at the moment of her death, and then wrapped post-mortem into a bundle with outer textiles. This trend has also been documented in the Llullaillaco and Aconcagua sites.

Scattered offerings recovered from the area included textiles, pottery shards, food, and the remains of a sacrificed camelid. Additionally, a small bundle of offerings was discovered containing sandals, cutlery, wooden and ceramic dishes, food items, a comb, and coal. Furthermore, a damaged tunic and a small female figurine made of spondylus shell (dressed in miniature versions of cumbi clothes) was recovered from the platform. The presence of the spondylus shell at the site is thought to be an offering for fertility, and is also characteristic of the Llullaillaco, Esmeralda, Chuscha, and Aconcagua sites.

=== Ampato ===
The Ampato summit rises up to 6,312 meters in southern Peru, with a funerary complex located at 5,852 meters. Four capacocha sacrifices were found at this site, representing two distinct ceremonies. The first sacrifice discovered was a girl estimated to be between 13 and 15 years old (based upon her tooth development), popularly referred to as "Juanita" or "The Ampato Ice Maiden." DNA testing determined that Juanita was related to individuals living in northern Peru and Argentina, and was likely not related to villages near Ampato. Juanita's body was discovered 70 meters below the summit, where she presumably landed after the collapse of her funerary platform. She was wrapped in high quality decorated textiles and surrounded by her funerary assemblage, including pottery, chuspas (some containing coca leaves or hair), llama bones, and four female figurines crafted from spondylus shell. A needle biopsy of Juanita's stomach revealed that she had been fed a large meal of vegetables around 6 to 8 hours before her sacrifice. Additionally, a CT scan indicated she was killed with a blow to the head.

The other three capacocha sacrifices interred at Ampato were found marked by stone circles within the funerary complex, and were all between the ages of 8 and 12. Two girls and one boy were discovered, all three of which were likely sacrificed during the same ceremony based on the positionality and proximity of the burials. The burial of the first girl found at the site was unusual compared to other capacocha burials, as six pots had been ritually broken on her grave. Her body was dressed with a macaw feather headdress and sandals, and was buried with numerous ceramic vessels, figurines, cups, spoons, and weaving tools. The male child was adorned with a vegetable fiber headdress and had elongated pierced earlobes, indicating he may have been the son of an elite family. He was buried with ceramic vessels, cups, and a male figurine. The second female body found was also buried with multiple ceramic vessels, as well as a female figurine crafted from spondylus shell. All three mummies had been damaged by lightning strikes, preventing soft tissue research from being done on their bodies.

== See also ==
- Child sacrifice in pre-Columbian cultures
- List of Andean peaks with known pre-Columbian ascents
