= Ritmo sustancia =

Studio album by Mala Fama
- Released: 2000
- Recorded: June 2000
- Studio: Bunker Recording Studio
- Genre: Cumbia villera
- Length: 39:56
- Language: Spanish
- Label: DBN; Rey Producciones Artísticas

Mala Fama chronology
Ritmo sustancia (2000)	Para vos basuura (2001)

Ritmo sustancia, also known as Ritmo y sustancia (lit. 'rhythm and substance'), is the debut studio album by Argentine cumbia villera band Mala Fama, released in 2000 by record label DBN and talent agency Rey Producciones Artísticas. The group was formed in 1998 by singer Hernán Coronel, who began writing songs that captured the language and experiences of his neighborhood. He soon partnered with keyboardist Cristian Galarza, a seasoned musician with a background in local cumbia groups, and together they developed a distinctive sound built around the use of synthesizers, percussive arrangements and informal, often humorous lyrics. The album was recorded in June 2000 at Bunker Recording Studio, and its tracks quickly circulated through tropical music clubs, parties and radio stations in working-class areas of Buenos Aires and its conurbation, positioning Mala Fama as one of the most prominent new acts in the rising cumbia villera scene.

Released during a period of growing poverty and unemployment in Argentina, Ritmo sustancia captured the atmosphere of the late 1990s and early 2000s, when cumbia villera was emerging as a major musical expression of the villas miseria—i.e., slums and shanty towns—of Buenos Aires' periphery. Its lyrics, sung in everyday slang and lunfardo, referenced crime, partying and marginalization in a way that was both direct and irreverent, resonating strongly with young audiences while provoking criticism from mainstream media and state regulators. Over time, the album came to be seen as one of the key works of early cumbia villera, both for its musical innovations—especially the central role of the pizzicato keyboard—and for its role in bringing the genre to national attention. It remains one of Mala Fama's most emblematic releases and a reference point in the history of Argentine cumbia of the 20th century.

== Background and recording ==
Mala Fama was formed in 1998 by vocalist Hernán Coronel, two years before recording their first album. The press at the time of their debut claimed that Coronel's original intention for the group was to fuse cumbia with the Mexican sonidero style but with more carefully crafted lyrics, and that it was not until meeting keyboardist Cristian Galarza that Mala Fama developed its own distinctive identity, often described as blending a playful sound with protest-themed lyrics delivered without excessive aggression. Interviewed in 2019, Coronel recalled that in 1998, after having written "a bunch of special songs, just me, staring at the wall and jotting them down with a pen in a notebook", he went to the studio of Galarza, a renowned cumbia keyboardist who had worked with groups such as Amar Azul and Yerba Brava, in Troncos del Talar, Tigre. There, the two finished shaping the material that would make up the group's first two albums: Ritmo sustancia and Para vos basuura, the latter released in 2001. The first of these songs that Coronel and Galarza recorded was "La marca de la gorra" (later released as the opener of Ritmo sustancia), which became a hit and quickly opened doors for them in the industry. Through the contacts of Juan "Chamuyo" Galarza, Cristian's father, they received offers from the record labels Magenta, Leader Music and DBN, ultimately choosing the latter. According to the liner notes of Ritmo sustancia, the album's recording sessions took place in June 2000 at Bunker Recording Studio.

Along with other groups that emerged around the same time (like Flor de Piedra, Yerba Brava, Damas Gratis and Pibes Chorros), Mala Fama were one of the pioneers of a new and distinctive style of Argentine cumbia rooted in the villas miseria (i.e., slums and shanty towns) of Greater Buenos Aires—aptly known as cumbia villera—which would go on to play a major role on the country's working-class music culture. The genre emerged in late 1990s Argentina amid a deep social and economic crisis that followed the implementation of neoliberal policies under President Carlos Menem, which intensified poverty, unemployment and marginalization in working-class neighborhoods and informal settlements. Coronel has stated that cumbia villera "gave a voice to the oppressed", expressing the experiences of those whose main cultural outlet was weekend parties. Rather than relying on sentimental or romantic themes, the genre articulated the "reality of the villas" in unvarnished terms, transforming the hardships of marginal life into a defining aesthetic. According to Coronel, it "wasn't corny" and bore strong similarities to the early development of hip hop in the United States, reflecting the everyday realities of urban street life. As a subgenre of traditional cumbia, it emerged as a form of protest and an attempt to make visible the realities of communities long ignored by mainstream society, drawing on everyday speech, lunfardo and football slang unfamiliar to other social groups and thereby reinforcing its connection to their specific class experience.

== Composition ==
"Sinfonía de cumbia"
"Sinfonía de cumbia" (transl. "Cumbia Symphony") exemplifies Mala Fama's distinctive style, marked by a "symphonic" sound and a prominent use of synthesizers with pizzicato effects that set the group apart from other cumbia villera bands.

Ritmo sustancia is one of the key albums that helped establish cumbia villera as a genre. A defining musical feature of this style was the innovative use of the synthesizer or keyboard as the central element of composition, sound and performance, serving as the main melodic or accompanying instrument. This marked a sharp contrast with earlier forms of Argentine cumbia, where keyboards were typically used for countermelodies or secondary lines, while the lead role was held by the electric guitar. Although they are one of the pioneers of the genre, Mala Fama developed a musical style that clearly distinguished them from other bands in the scene. Writing for Rolling Stone Argentina, Lucas Garófalo felt that: "From a strictly musical standpoint, Mala Fama's cumbia has little to do with cumbia villera, or with cumbia santafesina (...), or with anything in particular. The characteristic malafamero sound is as alien as the band's leader." José Totah of La Nación noted the "style of their music is difficult to define: it is an almost symphonic cumbia, with two keyboards and frequent use of pizzicato, which makes it both complex and melodious at the same time."

Galarza's distinctive arrangements, created using the pizzicato effect on 1990s Roland synthesizers, played a key role in shaping the group's musical identity, as did the percussion of Peruvian musician Marcos Gálvez, performed on an octapad. Coronel told Rolling Stone Argentina in 2019: "The first time we met, Cristian started going through the keyboard sounds to see which one I liked, and when he got to the pizzicato it was like, 'Wow, put that one on!' It's a dry sound, it has no reverb, so it's really hard to make arrangements with it. You have to be... I don't know, well, actually, in music anything is possible. (...) Cristian came up with the best arrangements you could ever imagine." Lyrically, the songs address themes common to the cumbia villera genre—crime, drugs, alcohol and sex—often approached with a humorous tone.

== Release and reception ==
Ritmo sustancia was released as a CD album in 2000 by the DBN label and talent agency Rey Producciones Artísticas. It achieved significant success, coinciding with the rise and peak in popularity of cumbia villera in the early 2000s. The newspaper Crónica reported in October 2001 that Ritmo sustancia had "hit it big" in the northern area of Greater Buenos Aires and had become one of the label's top sellers, with Rey Producciones Artísticas booking the group for performances at the most important cumbia dance parties in the metropolitan area. Contemporary coverage noted the rapid commercial breakthrough of the first wave of cumbia villera: by April 2001, groups associated with the scene had already sold close to 300,000 albums in Argentina, despite the ongoing recession. This surge accounted for roughly 25% of the domestic record market that year (excluding widespread piracy), underscoring the genre's rapid mainstream penetration. International press likened the phenomenon's swift rise and gritty themes to other contemporary youth musics, highlighting both its mass appeal and the controversy it generated. One indication of Mala Fama's popularity during the heyday of cumbia villera was a 2001 performance and comedy sketch on Videomatch—the most-watched show on Argentine television at the time— that was inspired by the group, with a parody of the song "La marca de la gorra". In addition, the band toured extensively across the country and, on several occasions, large crowds—often numbering 200 to 300 people—gathered outside the members' homes, making it difficult for them to leave.

The genre's rapid visibility also prompted regulatory scrutiny; in late 2002, the TV program Pasión tropical returned to air on channel América TV with the condition that it not feature cumbia villera segments, reflecting broadcast policies then in force. Critics of the genre accused it of glorifying crime and substance use, with mass media and upper-class discourses often portraying the "villero" figure as violent and delinquent. The social impact generated by cumbia villera, and particularly the controversy sparked by its direct and confrontational discourse, led the state to intervene in an effort to curb the reach of what was perceived as a "countercultural" product. In this context, a report issued by the COMFER outlining the guidelines for prohibiting cumbia villera placed special emphasis on lyrics that referred explicitly to violent acts and drug use. By the second half of the 2000s, cumbia villera had already passed its peak, and Mala Fama continued to perform in the provinces, often under more precarious conditions.

Ritmo sustancia is considered one of the most celebrated and defining albums of cumbia villera, and is often cited as a classic of the genre. Mala Fama is often mentioned alongside Damas Gratis as one of the only acts that helped define the early cumbia villera scene and managed to maintain longevity long after its peak. In the case of the former, Coronel experienced renewed visibility with the rise of social media, where his eccentric persona gained widespread attention and helped establish him as a pop icon.

== Track listing ==
No.	Title	Writer(s)	Length
1.	"La marca de la gorra"	Hernán Coronel; Cristian Galarza	3:36
2.	"Te volviste ...uto"	Reinaldo Lío; Elías Roque Oscarez	4:04
3.	"Soy mala fama"	Coronel; Galarza	3:10
4.	"Estoy de nuevo"	Coronel; Galarza	3:15
5.	"El soguero"	Coronel; Galarza; Oscar Pedro de Campodonico	3:26
6.	"Mi alegría"	Coronel; Galarza	4:20
7.	"Guampa chata"	Coronel; Galarza; Campodonico	2:31
8.	"Pocos quedan"	Coronel; Galarza	4:29
9.	"Made in Argentina"	Coronel; Galarza	3:19
10.	"Sinfonía de cumbia"	Coronel; Galarza	3:46
Total length:			39:56

== Personnel ==
Credits adapted from Ritmo sustancia's liner notes.

- Hernán Coronel – vocals
- Cristian Galarza – keyboards
- David Álvarez – keyboards
- Sebastián Silva – piano
- Maximiliano – timbales
- Marcos Pintos – güiro
- Marcos Gálvez – octapad
- Lucas – bass guitar

== See also ==
- 2000 in Latin music
- Drug use in music
