= Argentine cumbia =

Dance and music style in Argentina

Argentine cumbia is an umbrella term that comprises several distinct trends within the same tradition: the dance and music style known as cumbia in Argentina.

Originally from Colombia, cumbia has been well-known and appreciated in Argentina for a long time, but it gained nationwide scope and attention when it became popular among the lower-class people in main urban centers, the large cities of the Río de la Plata basin, in the 1990s.

Among the most important cumbia bands and singers that popularized the genre are Ráfaga, La Nueva Luna, Amar Azul, Gilda, Ezequiel Cwirkaluk and other traditional cumbia bands like Los Palmeras, Cali and Los Leales. Chocolate had similar success across the water in Uruguay.

Most bands are composed of synthesizer keyboards as main instruments, electronic sounds and percussion, and a musical score very charged with vocal harmonies, bells, and trumpets (usually electronically synthesized).

== History ==
In the 1990s, cumbia first found a place among the working classes, who attended large dancing halls called bailantas, often to listen and watch live concerts by cumbia groups. Some bands, most notably Ráfaga, chose a glamorous style with theatrically presented messages about romantic love and sensuality, hope and despair. Others took to more explicit themes, such as sex, alcoholism, and the cumbia subculture itself, often in a very light, irreverent style, sometimes intentionally humorous.

The rhythm and themes of cumbia then spread to the whole of society, as its romantic and humorous manifestations were adopted to lighten up parties and other social events.

Around the beginning of the 2000s, probably influenced by the 1998–2002 Argentine great depression, romantic cumbia drifted slowly away from the spotlight, while the rest of the bands slowly gave way to the much more aggressive cumbia villera ("shantytown cumbia")—with lyrics that explored the themes of crime and drug abuse—which was from the start mostly restricted to the urban lower classes. Key albums of the early cumbia villera include La vanda más loca (1999) by Flor de Piedra, Cumbia villera (2000) by Yerba Brava, Ritmo sustancia (2000) by Mala Fama, Para los pibes (2000) by Damas Gratis and Arriba las manos (2001) by Pibes Chorros.

Over 25 years of history, cumbia in Argentina was heavily influenced by other Argentine folkloric kinds of music, like chamamé, guaracha, and cuarteto. Cumbia songs tell stories about love and experiences of common people. Cumbia in Argentina also has different styles depending on the country's region, like norteña, santafesina, cordobesa, sonidera, and other more recent styles like cumbia-rap and cumbia villera.

In the present, cumbia bands play electric guitars, bass guitars, electronic percussion and synthesizers, all common instruments of rock bands, and there are also other instruments like bongos, trumpets, accordions, etc.

The clothing is also a very important characteristic of cumbia bands. Each band has its own way of dressing, usually all members of the band wear the same special costume or exclusive clothes.

In the late 2000s a new brand of cumbia that could be defined as Argentine cumbia became popular in some clubs in Buenos Aires, most notably Zizek Club, led by artists such as El Remolón, Fauna, Chancha via Circuito and Tremor. These artists, who focused on electronic productions featuring the cumbia rhythm, began releasing records largely on the ZZK Records imprint and achieved some international exposure, with their style of music being labelled as digital cumbia.

== See also ==
- Music of Argentina
- Cumbia villera
