= Rubén Deicas =

Argentine singer (born 1952)

- Deicas in 2022

Background information
- Born: Rubén Héctor Deicas; 28 January 1952 (age 74); Santa Fe, Argentina
- Genre: Cumbia santafesina
- Occupation: Singer
- Instruments: Vocals; güiro
- Years active: 1972–present
- Formerly of: Los Palmeras

Rubén Héctor Deicas (born 28 January 1952), also known professionally as Cacho Deicas, is an Argentine musician and singer. He was a member of the cumbia band Los Palmeras from 1978 to 2025, when he began his solo career. He is known as one of the most famous and legendary vocalists of cumbia from Santa Fe.

== Early life ==
Born in 1952, Deicas was already a milkman at the age of 10. Later, he worked as a cleaner in a pizzeria, and in the 1970s, he was a factory worker in a metalworking plant that manufactured laboratory equipment. One day, the factory closed, and Deicas reinvented himself as a grocer. By day, he visted stores offering sugar, yerba mate, and noodles; by night, played at bachelor and wedding parties with Los Búfalos.

== Musical career ==
=== Beginnings ===
Throughout that time of work experience, Deicas also developed his future musical career, singing in bands such as Los Dandys, Los Guamaleros, Los Búfalos and Los Tekilas.

=== Los Palmeras ===
In 1972, six musicians in the city of Santa Fe to form a tropical musical group called Sexteto Palmeras. At the time, Czeslav Popowicz (known as Yuli) was the lead singer. In 1978, Popowicz left the band and was replaced by Deicas, who remained until 2025, when he began his solo career. With Deicas, Los Palmeras achieved national hits such as "La Suavecita", "El Parrandero", "La Chola", "Clarito", "El Bombón Asesino" and the cumbia version of "La Bestia Pop".

== Personal life ==
Deicas has been married to María Rosa for five decades since the 1970s. They have five children. Among them is Cristian, who is the guitarist of the rock band Astro Bonzo.

In 2009, Deicas suffered a stroke, from which he recovered without any lasting effects. In an interview with Clarín, he stated that the stroke occurred while he was watching a game on TV on his bed, he felt his arms and legs go numb. In October 2020, Deicas contracted COVID-19 along with most of the members of Los Palmeras, after which all were discharged from the hospital without complications.

In 2025, Deicas suffered another stroke, which kept him away from the stage. After recovering, he decided to embark on a solo career, taking advantage of the success and recognition he had already achieved throughout his years with Los Palmeras.

== Discography ==
=== Collaborations ===
- 1996: Un amor entre dos
  (La Sonora Bonita - Todo el mundo)
- 2003: Santa Fe
  (Monchito Merlo - Monchito de oro)
- 2006: Enganchados: La suavecita / La Chola / Niña morena / El bombón
  (Zandunga - 10 Años)
- 2013: Llorarás más de diez veces
  (Carolina Antiman - La prohibida)
  - Más que tu amigo
    (El Negro Flick y sus Musiqueros de Santa Fe - Con más fuerza que nunca)
- 2014: El bombón
  (Los Ramonestones - Peligro Sin Codificar: Boom!)
  - Irene
    (Vilma Palma e Vampiros - Agarrate fuerte)
  - Amémonos 《Enganchados con invitados》
    (Grupo Alegría - Iluminados)
- 2015: El amante
  (Ezequiel El Brujo - 37 Años... de magia)
  - Cumbia yo te canto
    (Los Tekilas - 30 Años)
- 2016: Se fue
  (Lumila - No quiero nada)
- 2017: No soy un hombre malo
  (Grupo Capelina - La banda líder)
- 2018: La muerte
  (Grupo Cali - Diferentes)
  - Olvídala / El más popular
    (La Vanidosa - Todo a su tiempo)
- 2019: Corazón no me preguntes
  (Sergio Torres - Inolvidable)
  - ¿Qué voy a hacer?
    (Marcos Castelló)
- 2020: La vida es un carnaval
  (Marcela Morelo - Tu mejor plan)
- 2021: La segunda del hombre del acordeón
  (Los Lirios de Santa Fe, Grupo Cali, La Nueva Luna, Los Palmeras, Cuarteto Imperial)
  - Camina (Suave y elegante)
    (Abel Pintos)
- 2022: Jurabas tú
  (Los Auténticos Decadentes - ADN: Capítulo D)
