= Emmanuel Cáceres =

Argentine footballer

Personal information
- Full name: Héctor Emmanuel Cáceres
- Date of birth: 12 December 1988 (age 37)
- Place of birth: Salta, Argentina
- Height: 1.82 m (6 ft 0 in)
- Position: Midfielder

Team information
- Current team: Villa San Antonio

Senior career*
Years	Team	Apps	(Gls)
2006	Racing de Trelew	0	(0)
- Central Norte
- Villa San Antonio
2008–2009	Atlético Concepción	19	(5)
2009–2010	Juventud Antoniana	17	(0)
2011–2012	Talleres		
2012–2013	Villa Cubas	15	(2)
2013–2014	Talleres		
2014	Camioneros Argentinos	13	(1)
2016	Pellegrini	8	(3)
2016–2017	Central Norte	38	(9)
2018	Villa San Antonio		
2018–2019	Defensores Unidos	36	(4)
2020–	Villa San Antonio	6	(2)
- * Club domestic league appearances and goals as of 16:39, 12 July 2020 (UTC)

Héctor Emmanuel Cáceres (born 12 December 1988) is an Argentine professional footballer who plays as a midfielder for Villa San Antonio.

== Career ==
Cáceres' early years were spent in the lower leagues with Racing de Trelew, Central Norte and Villa San Antonio. In 2008, Cáceres agreed terms with Atlético Concepción. After five goals in nineteen games for the aforementioned team, Cáceres was signed by Torneo Argentino A side Juventud Antoniana; who he'd feature seventeen times for. Cáceres played for Villa Cubas in 2012–13 in tier four, which fell in-between one-year stints with Talleres. He left Talleres for a second time in mid-2014, subsequently spending the rest of the year with Camioneros Argentinos. In 2016, Pellegrini of Torneo Argentino B signed Cáceres.

Later in 2016, Cáceres rejoined Central Norte though departed eighteen months later to resign for Villa San Antonio. On 18 June 2018, Cáceres completed a move to Primera B Metropolitana outfit Defensores Unidos. He made his professional league debut on 24 August versus Estudiantes, with his opening goals for them arriving in September against Sacachispas and Almirante Brown. 2020 saw Cáceres resign with Villa San Antonio, now of the Torneo Regional Federal Amateur.

== Personal life ==
Cáceres, alongside his role as a footballer, is one of the lead vocalists of his cumbia santafesina band Toco y Me Voy.

== Career statistics ==
As of 12 July 2020.

Appearances and goals by club, season and competition
Club	Season	League			Cup		League Cup		Continental		Other		Total	
Club	Season	Division	Apps	Goals	Apps	Goals	Apps	Goals	Apps	Goals	Apps	Goals	Apps	Goals
Atlético Concepción	2008–09	Torneo Argentino B	19	5	0	0	—		—		0	0	19	5
Juventud Antoniana	2009–10	Torneo Argentino A	17	0	0	0	—		—		0	0	17	0
Villa Cubas	2012–13	Torneo Argentino B	15	2	0	0	—		—		0	0	15	2
Camioneros Argentinos	2014	Torneo Argentino B	13	1	0	0	—		—		0	0	13	1
Pellegrini	2016	Torneo Argentino B	8	3	0	0	—		—		0	0	8	3
Central Norte	2016–17	Torneo Argentino B	38	9	1	0	—		—		0	0	39	9
Central Norte	2017–18	Torneo Argentino B	0	0	0	0	—		—		0	0	0	0
Central Norte	Total		38	9	1	0	—		—		0	0	39	9
Defensores Unidos	2018–19	Primera B Metropolitana	28	4	1	0	—		—		0	0	29	4
Defensores Unidos	2019–20	Primera B Metropolitana	8	0	0	0	—		—		0	0	8	0
Defensores Unidos	Total		36	4	1	0	—		—		0	0	37	4
Villa San Antonio	2020	Federal Amateur	6	2	0	0	—		—		0	0	6	2
Career total			180	30	2	0	—		—		0	0	182	30
