= Leccese (disambiguation) =

Leccese may refer to:

- Leccese, a breed of domestic sheep indigenous to the Salento peninsula, in Puglia, Italy
- Franco Leccese (1925–1995), Italian sprinter
- Luciano Gabriel Leccese (born 1982), Argentine professional footballer
- Muro Leccese, a town and comune in the Province of Lecce,
- Prince of Muro Leccese, Italian noble title created in 1619 by the Spanish crown for the Barons of Badolato and Belmonte
