= Cumbia santafesina =

Musical style from Santa Fe, Argentina

- Stylistic origins: Colombian cumbia
- Cultural origins: Santa Fe Province
- Typical instruments: Accordion; guitar; acoustic bass guitar; timbaletas; güiro; vocals; tumbadoras

Cumbia santafesina is a musical style that arose in Santa Fe, Argentina. It is distinguished by taking the guitar and the accordion as the main instruments. Another distinctive feature of cumbia santafesina compared to other subgenres of the rest of Argentine cumbia is that its lyrics have mainly romantic themes.

== History ==
=== Background ===
Cumbia santafesina began in the mid 1960s with the creation of Grupo Santa Cecilia, who adapted Colombian cumbia introduced to the country by bands such as the Imperial Quartet, with a distinctive Italian and Polish influence (Los Palmeras, Yuli and Los Girasoles), above all on their accordions. This bands was led by accordionist Alberto Fernández, alias Toto ; Toto Fernández would be a teacher and mentor to numerous accordionists of this musical genre, such as Marcos Caminos (leader of Los Palmeras), Miguel Carranza (leader of Los Cumbiambas, Dario Zanco (leader of Grupo Cali) and many others. The vocalist of Grupo Santa Cecilia was the young Italian of Polish origin Czeslav Popowicz, who would be vocalist of Los Palmeras and leader of the bands Yuli y los Girasoles at the beginning of the 1970s, at the hands of Los Cumbiambas and Los Palmeras, the cumbia santafesina with accordion was widely accepted by the public of the capital santafesina and its surroundings (including Paraná). In 1975, in Buenos Aires, the santafesina band Los Duendes recorded their first record work, being the first band of cumbia santafesina to launch their work on record. The following year, from the hand of the representative Martín Robustiano Gutiérrez, Los Palmeras released their first album. But the event that finished defining the style was the appearance of the band Los del Bohio who adopted the guitar as the main instrument, leaving aside the traditional accordion. This band was founded in 1976 by the guitarist Juan Carlos Denis, who had previously played in renowned bands of the time such as Emil Villar and his Ensemble, Los Cumbiambas and El Cuartetazo.

These first bands of cumbia santafesina were characterized by their amateurism and by the difficulties they faced in obtaining funds that would allow them to record their material. It is at this time that the figure of Martín "Chani" Robustiano Gutiérrez was key, who raised funds so that these recordings could be made. In his honor the day of cumbia santafesina is celebrated every 5 November when a new anniversary of his death is celebrated.

=== Popularity ===
Cumbia santafesina was generalizing. The singers of Los del Bohío put together their own musical ensembles. It was Juan Carlos Mascheroni, alias "Banana", who after leaving Los del Bohio created Los del Fuego and Alfredo Rafaél Bernal who formed Fredy and the Nobles, Víctor Salvador Duarte, who heads Los Lamas. Miguel Aragón founder of Los Leales. The implantation of cumbia santafesina at the end of the 70's in Greater Buenos Aires, very especially in the South zone. It also resulted in the creation of musical ensembles of this style. One of them, renowned band LoLoyal. The implantation of cumbia santafesina at the end of the 70's in Greater Buenos Aires, very especially in the South zone. It also resulted in the creation of musical ensembles of this style. One of them, the renowned band Los Leales. In the city of Resistencia, capital of the Chaco Province, Santa Fe cumbia is very popular in the southern neighborhoods of the capital.

With the cumbia santafesina already consolidated new bands appeared, and incorporated new trends. Osvaldo "El Abuelo" Raggio leaves Los Palmeras to form Grupo Alegría, with a faster cumbia style that emphasized the accordion and the timbaleta. In 1993, he took the position of vocalist for Grupo Trinidad Leo Mattioli, who would later develop an important solo career until his death in 2011.

== Styles ==
Different styles can be highlighted within the Cumbia Santafesina:

- 'With guitar' : takes the guitar as the main instrument. The most outstanding bands are: Juan Carlos Denis and his Bohio, Yuli and the Sunflowers, Los Lamas, Los Leales and Los del Fuego.
- 'With accordion' : Inspired by Colombian cumbia, it focuses its sound on the accordion. The most prominent bands are Los Lirios, Grupo Cali and Los Palmeras
- 'Sound' : in this style the main instrument is the trumpet. The best-known bands are: Los Cartageneros, Sonora Estrella and La Sonora Bonita
- 'Cumbia percussionist / salsa' : it is based on the use of the accordion, timpani and salsa percussion (congas, bongo and bell) as main instruments. Most important bands: Grupo Cali, Mario Pereyra, Coty Hernández, Sergio Torres, Los Bam Band and El Combo 10.
- 'Romantic Cumbia' : It has a predominance of the keyboard and a slower rhythmic base. The main bands are: Grupo Trinidad, Leo Mattioli, Dalila and Uriel Lozano.

== Cumbia Santafesina Day ==
It is celebrated every 5 November, a date chosen in honor of Martín Robustiano Gutiérrez "Chani" (26 April 1944 – 5 November 1992) who was the owner of record store and producer, becoming the driving force behind this musical genre.

== See also ==
- Cumbia villera
- Argentine cumbia
