= Salta =

City in Salta Province, Argentina

- City
- Salta
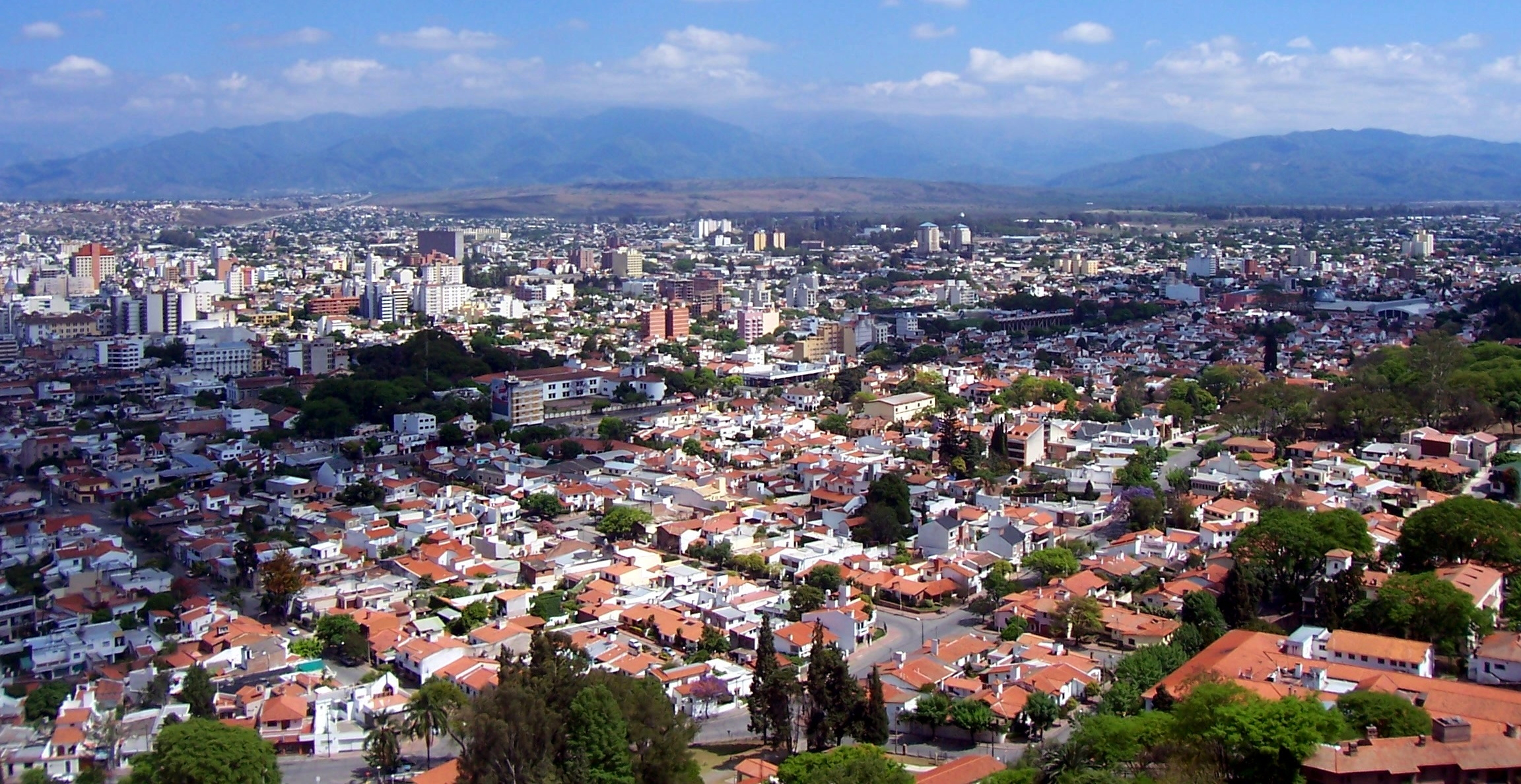
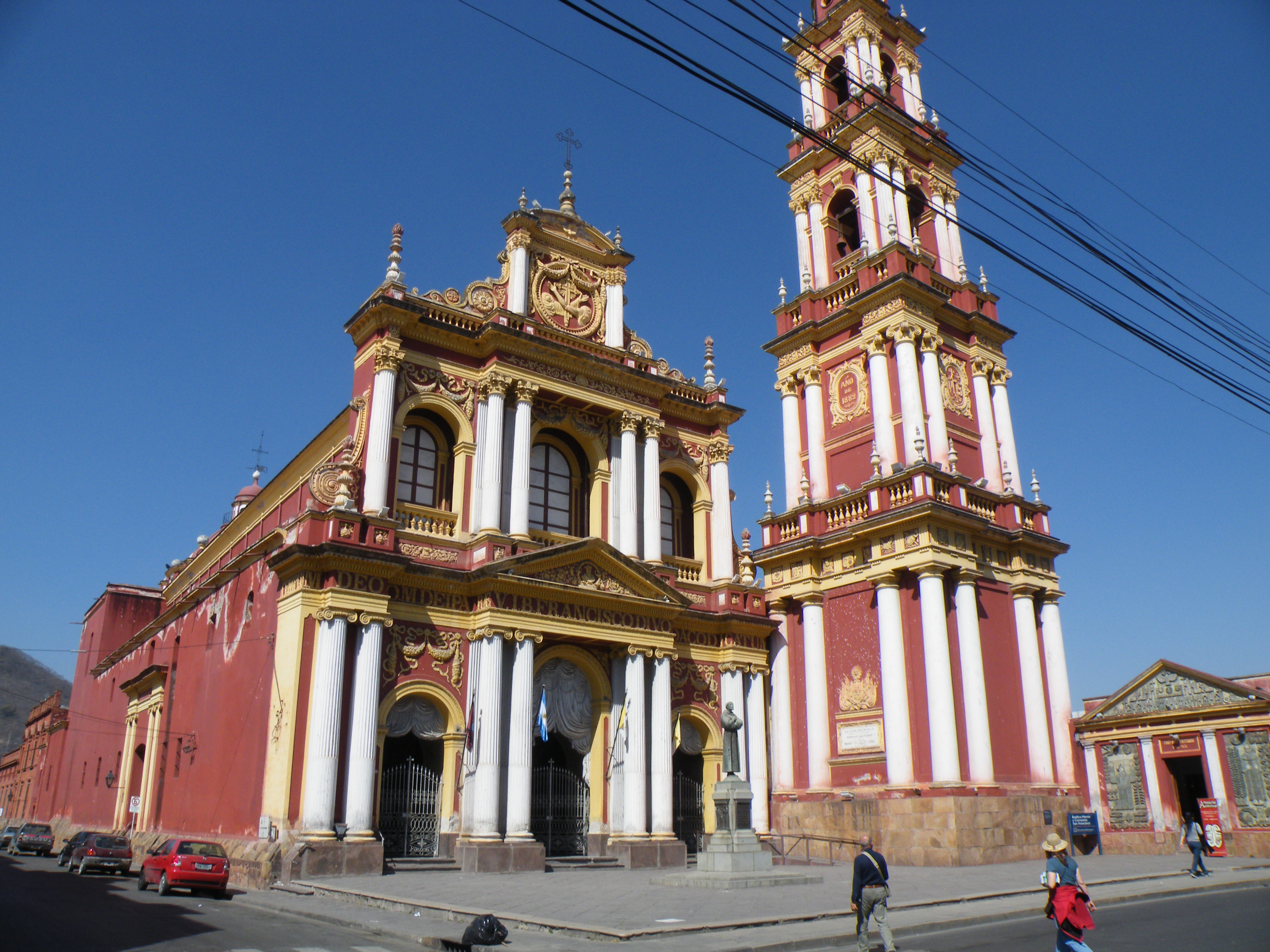
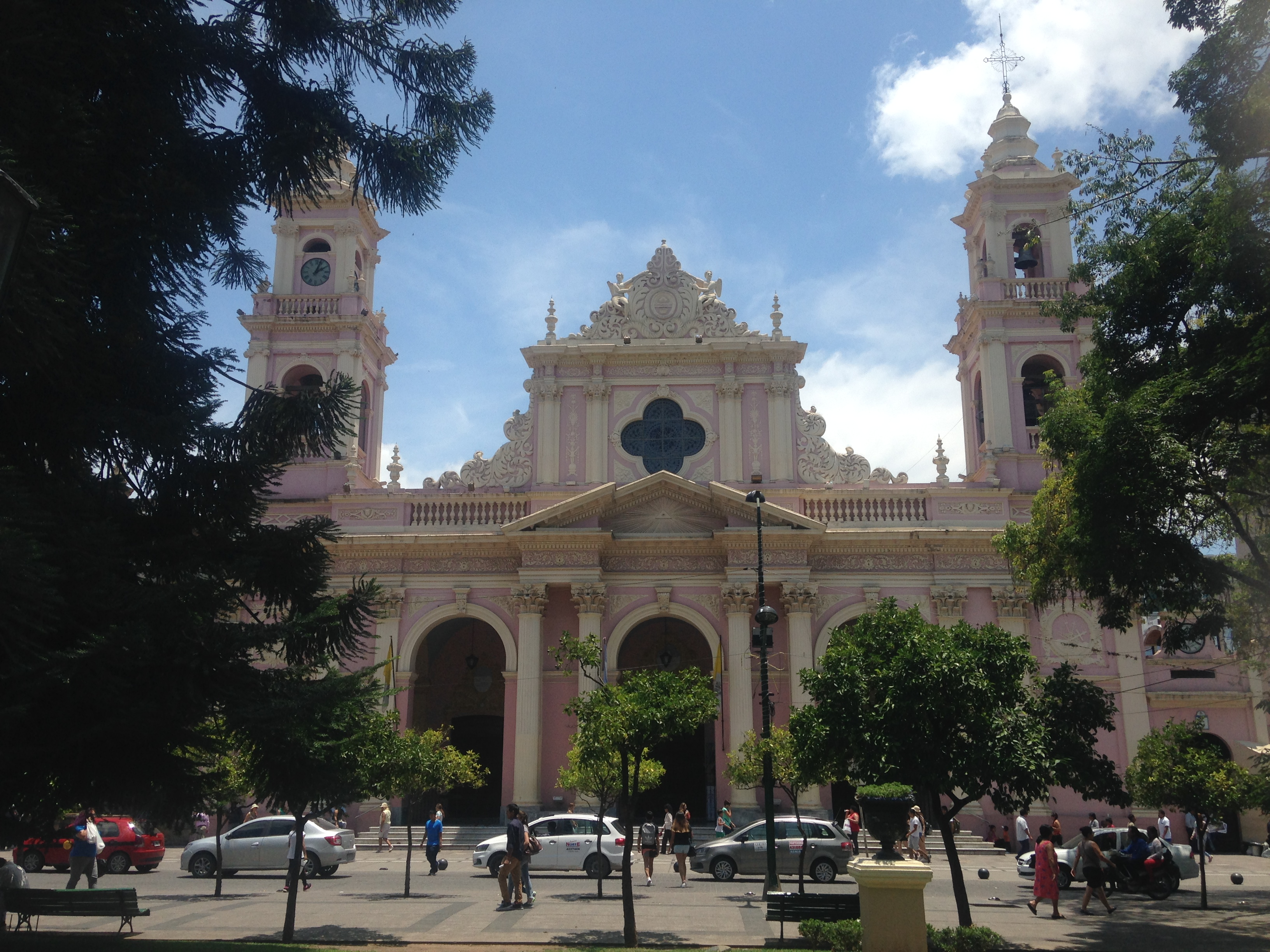
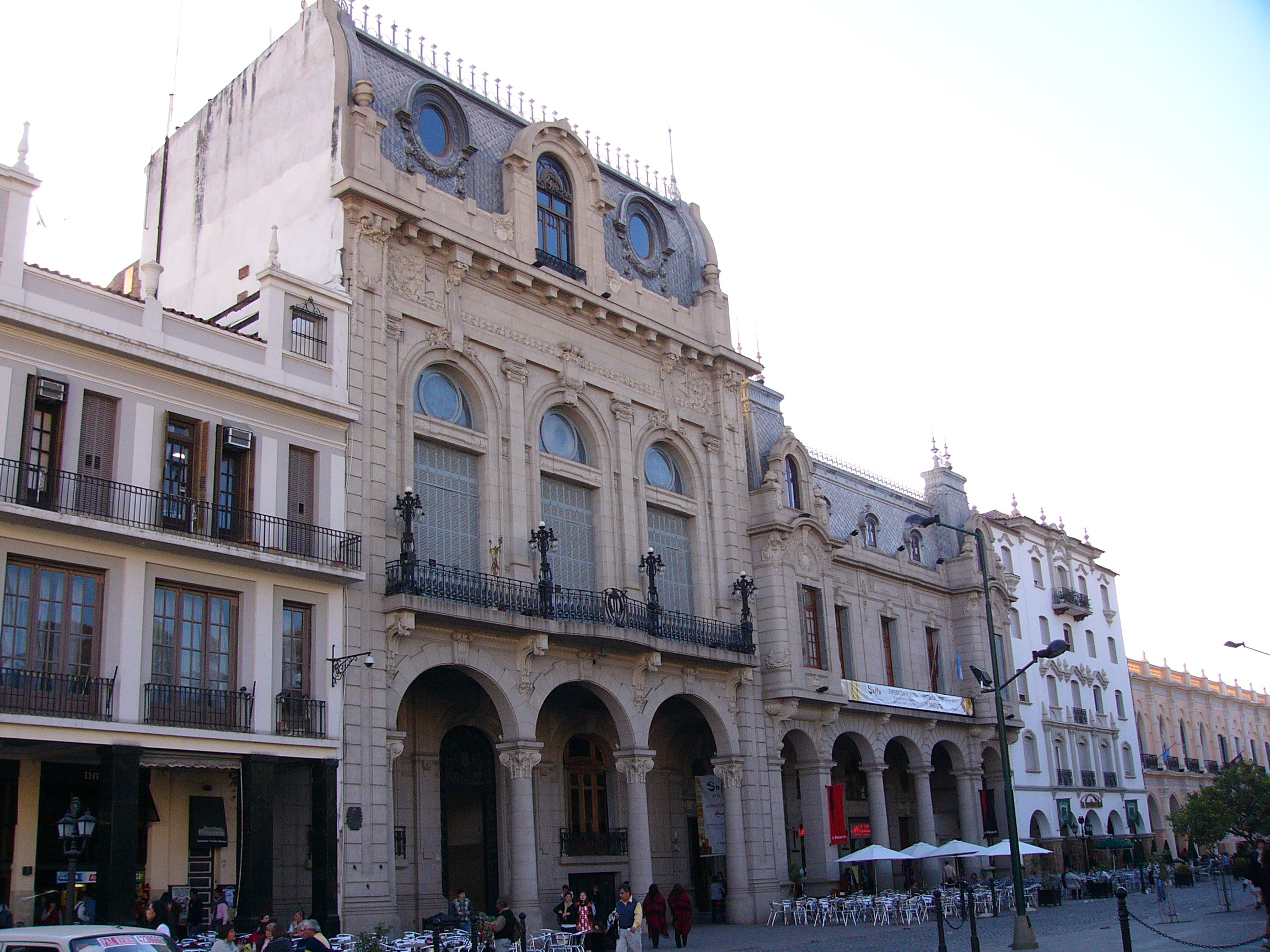
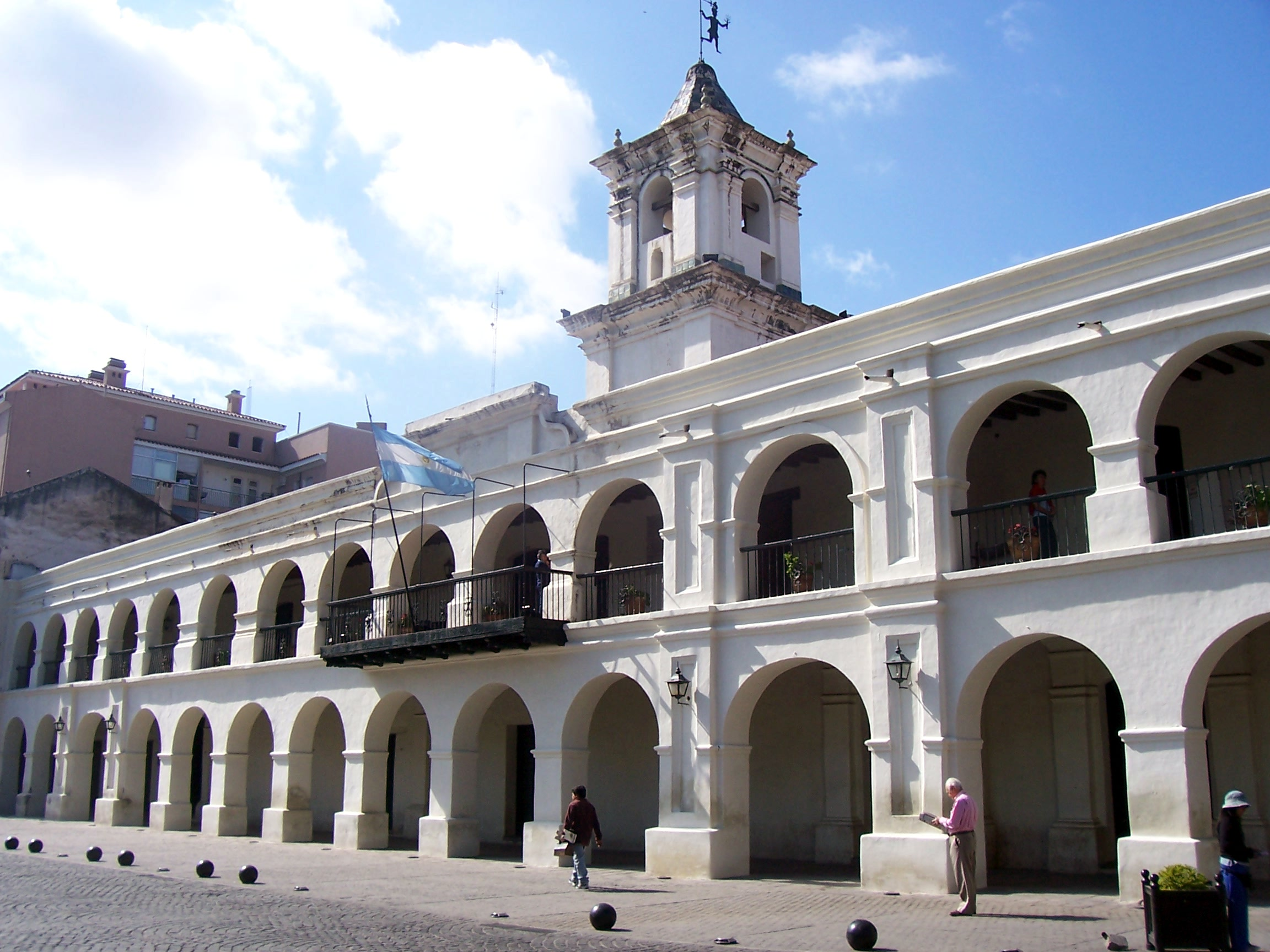
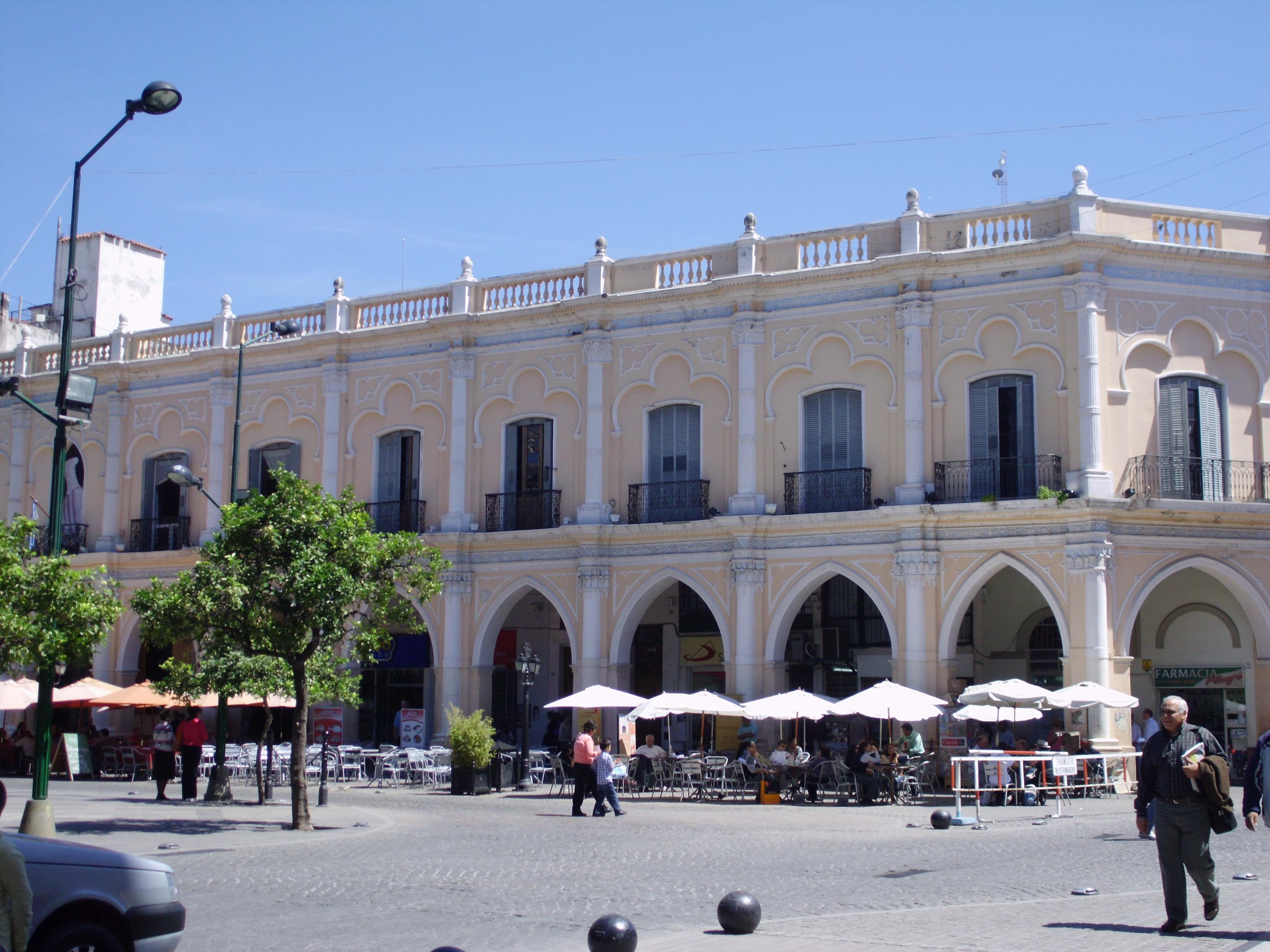
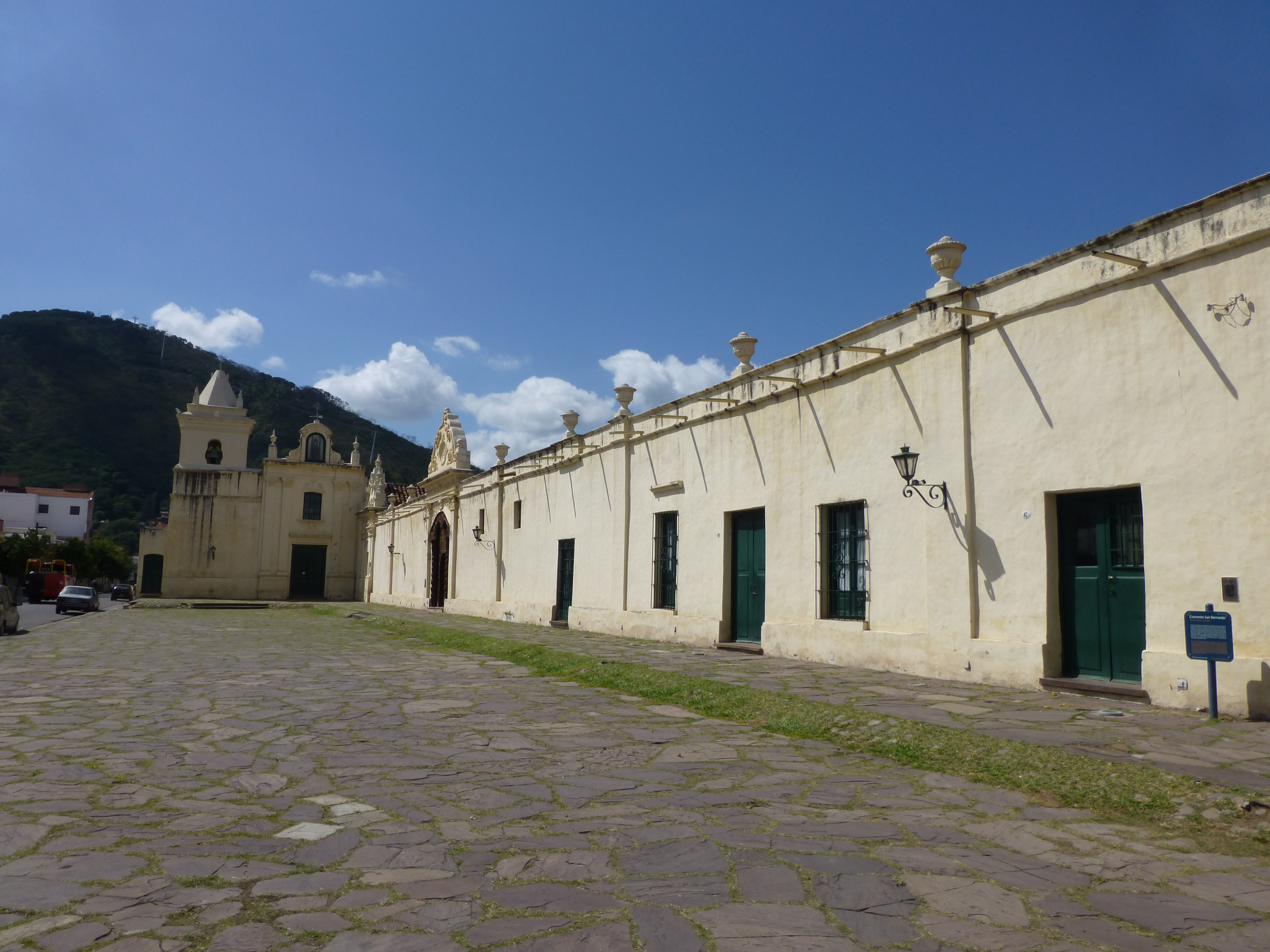
- Skyline of Salta from the San Bernardo hill's chairlift Basilica of San Francisco Salta Cathedral America Cultural Center Salta Cabildo Museum of High Altitude Archaeology Convent of San Bernardo

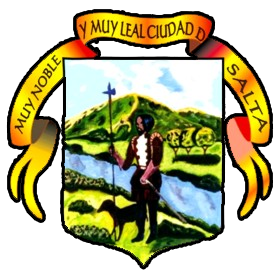
- Coat of arms

- Location of Salta in Argentina Salta (Argentina)
- Coordinates: 24°47′S 65°25′W
- Country: Argentina
- Province: Salta
- Department: Capital
- Founded: April 16th, 1582

Government
  - Intendant: Emiliano Durand (Vamos Por Salta)

Area
  - City: 120 km^{2} (46 sq mi)
- Elevation: 1,152 m (3,780 ft)

Population (2022 census)
  - Urban: 627,704
  - Urban density: 14,000/km^{2} (36,000/sq mi)
- Demonym: Salteño/a
- Time zone: UTC−3 (ART)
- CPA base: A4400
- Dialing code: +54 387
- Climate: Cwb
- Website: salta.gob.ar

Salta (Spanish: [ˈsalta]) is the capital and largest city in the Argentine province of the same name. With a population of 627,704 according to the 2022 census, it is also the 7th most-populous city in Argentina. The city serves as the cultural and economic center of the Valle de Lerma Metropolitan Area (Spanish: Área Metropolitana del Valle de Lerma, AMVL), which is home to over 50.9% of the population of Salta Province and also includes the municipalities of La Caldera, Vaqueros, Campo Quijano, Rosario de Lerma, Cerrillos, La Merced and San Lorenzo. Salta is the seat of the Capital Department, the most populous department in the province.

== History ==
In early 1536 the large expedition of Diego de Almagro passed through the plains of Chicoana west of the present-day city in its journey to the lands of Chile. While foraging the expeditionaries came to engage in skirmishes with local tribesmen.

Salta was founded on April 16, 1582, by the Spanish conquistador Hernando de Lerma, who intended the settlement to be an outpost between Lima, Peru and Buenos Aires. The origin of the name Salta is a matter of conjecture, with several theories being advanced to explain it.

During the war of independence, the city became a commercial and military strategic point between Peru and the Argentine cities. Between 1816 and 1821, the city was led by local military leader General Martín Miguel de Güemes, who under the command of General José de San Martín, defended the city and surrounding area from Spanish forces coming from further north.

Salta emerged from the War of Independence politically in disarray and financially bankrupt, a condition that lingered throughout much of the 19th century. However, in the late 19th and early 20th centuries, the arrival of Italian, Spanish, British, and Arab immigrants, particularly Syrians and Lebanese, revived trade and agriculture all over the area while further enhancing the city's multicultural flavor.

== Geography ==
=== Climate ===
Salta has a subtropical highland climate (Cwb, according to the Köppen climate classification), and it is characterized by pleasant weather year-round. Located in the subtropical north, but at an altitude of 1,200 metres, Salta enjoys 4 distinct seasons: summers are warm with frequent thunderstorms, with daytime highs around 26 to 28 °C (78.8 to 82.4 °F) and pleasant, refreshing nights around 15 or 16 °C (59 or 61 °F). Fall brings dry weather, pleasant days at around 22 °C (71.6 °F) and mild nights at around 10 °C (50.0 °F). By winter, the dryness is extreme, with very few rain episodes. Nights are cool at 3 °C (37.4 °F) on average, but daytime heating allows for high temperatures of 19 °C (66.2 °F). Snow is rare and frost is quite common, with temperatures reaching down to −7 °C (19.4 °F) during the coldest nights. Spring brings sunny weather with warm days and mild nights: days range from 25 to 28 °C (77.0 to 82.4 °F) with nights between 10 and 14 °C (50.0 and 57.2 °F). Salta's winters are rather warm for its elevation and far inland position for a location being just outside the tropics.

Of the over 700 millimetres (28 in) of rain that Salta receives yearly, over 80% falls between December and March, when thunderstorms occur almost daily. During the rest of the year, blue skies dominate the region. Seemingly incessant summer thunderstorms greatly rejuvenate the surrounding mountainous landscape, making the various hills and mountainsides within the vicinity of the city green and lush once again. Salta receives 1863 hours of bright sunshine each year or about 5.1 hours per day. The highest recorded temperature was 39.9 °C (103.8 °F) on November 28, 1972, while the lowest recorded temperature was −9.4 °C (15.1 °F) on August 5, 1966.

Climate data for Salta, Argentina (Martín Miguel de Güemes International Airport) 1991–2020, extremes 1873–present
| Month | Jan | Feb | Mar | Apr | May | Jun | Jul | Aug | Sep | Oct | Nov | Dec | Year |
|---|---|---|---|---|---|---|---|---|---|---|---|---|---|
| Record high °C (°F) | 36.4 (97.5) | 35.1 (95.2) | 34.0 (93.2) | 34.3 (93.7) | 34.2 (93.6) | 34.6 (94.3) | 37.2 (99.0) | 37.8 (100.0) | 37.8 (100.0) | 39.3 (102.7) | 39.9 (103.8) | 39.6 (103.3) | 39.9 (103.8) |
| Mean daily maximum °C (°F) | 27.7 (81.9) | 26.5 (79.7) | 25.1 (77.2) | 22.9 (73.2) | 20.3 (68.5) | 19.8 (67.6) | 19.9 (67.8) | 22.7 (72.9) | 24.7 (76.5) | 26.9 (80.4) | 27.6 (81.7) | 28.4 (83.1) | 24.4 (75.9) |
| Daily mean °C (°F) | 21.5 (70.7) | 20.6 (69.1) | 19.4 (66.9) | 16.8 (62.2) | 13.3 (55.9) | 10.9 (51.6) | 10.1 (50.2) | 12.8 (55.0) | 15.8 (60.4) | 19.3 (66.7) | 20.6 (69.1) | 21.7 (71.1) | 16.9 (62.4) |
| Mean daily minimum °C (°F) | 16.8 (62.2) | 16.1 (61.0) | 15.2 (59.4) | 12.2 (54.0) | 8.1 (46.6) | 4.5 (40.1) | 2.9 (37.2) | 4.8 (40.6) | 7.7 (45.9) | 12.1 (53.8) | 14.2 (57.6) | 16.0 (60.8) | 10.9 (51.6) |
| Record low °C (°F) | 6.1 (43.0) | 4.8 (40.6) | 2.2 (36.0) | −1.5 (29.3) | −4.6 (23.7) | −7.5 (18.5) | −8.7 (16.3) | −9.4 (15.1) | −4.5 (23.9) | −1.3 (29.7) | 1.5 (34.7) | 6.2 (43.2) | −9.4 (15.1) |
| Average precipitation mm (inches) | 197.1 (7.76) | 147.3 (5.80) | 107.3 (4.22) | 42.1 (1.66) | 9.7 (0.38) | 2.5 (0.10) | 2.7 (0.11) | 2.3 (0.09) | 5.7 (0.22) | 23.9 (0.94) | 59.3 (2.33) | 138.4 (5.45) | 738.3 (29.07) |
| Average precipitation days (≥ 0.1 mm) | 15.4 | 14.4 | 13.7 | 7.0 | 3.8 | 1.7 | 1.7 | 1.5 | 2.1 | 5.3 | 9.0 | 13.0 | 88.6 |
| Average snowy days | 0.0 | 0.0 | 0.0 | 0.0 | 0.1 | 0.1 | 0.4 | 0.1 | 0.1 | 0.0 | 0.0 | 0.0 | 0.7 |
| Average relative humidity (%) | 77.2 | 80.6 | 82.9 | 82.3 | 80.5 | 75.6 | 69.3 | 60.4 | 55.8 | 60.6 | 66.1 | 71.5 | 71.9 |
| Mean monthly sunshine hours | 195.3 | 166.7 | 158.1 | 159.0 | 158.1 | 171.0 | 204.6 | 223.2 | 210.0 | 210.8 | 213.0 | 217.0 | 2,286.8 |
| Mean daily sunshine hours | 6.3 | 5.9 | 5.1 | 5.3 | 5.1 | 5.7 | 6.6 | 7.2 | 7.0 | 6.8 | 7.1 | 7.0 | 6.3 |
| Percentage possible sunshine | 46.0 | 42.4 | 38.7 | 47.6 | 44.3 | 52.7 | 61.2 | 59.9 | 56.7 | 52.3 | 49.6 | 56.5 | 50.7 |
Source 1: Servicio Meteorológico Nacional (percent sun 1991–2000)
Source 2: Meteo Climat (record highs and lows)

Climate data for Salta INTA (located in Cerrillos) 1969–2009
| Month | Jan | Feb | Mar | Apr | May | Jun | Jul | Aug | Sep | Oct | Nov | Dec | Year |
|---|---|---|---|---|---|---|---|---|---|---|---|---|---|
| Record high °C (°F) | 37.6 (99.7) | 33.9 (93.0) | 33.9 (93.0) | 33.0 (91.4) | 33.7 (92.7) | 33.5 (92.3) | 36.2 (97.2) | 36.2 (97.2) | 37.4 (99.3) | 37.9 (100.2) | 39.5 (103.1) | 38.0 (100.4) | 39.5 (103.1) |
| Mean daily maximum °C (°F) | 27.2 (81.0) | 26.1 (79.0) | 24.9 (76.8) | 22.6 (72.7) | 20.5 (68.9) | 19.3 (66.7) | 19.9 (67.8) | 21.9 (71.4) | 23.6 (74.5) | 26.4 (79.5) | 27.3 (81.1) | 27.9 (82.2) | 24.0 (75.2) |
| Daily mean °C (°F) | 21.3 (70.3) | 20.3 (68.5) | 19.4 (66.9) | 16.7 (62.1) | 13.5 (56.3) | 10.9 (51.6) | 10.7 (51.3) | 12.9 (55.2) | 15.4 (59.7) | 18.9 (66.0) | 20.4 (68.7) | 21.4 (70.5) | 16.8 (62.2) |
| Mean daily minimum °C (°F) | 16.7 (62.1) | 15.9 (60.6) | 15.4 (59.7) | 12.2 (54.0) | 8.2 (46.8) | 4.8 (40.6) | 3.8 (38.8) | 5.4 (41.7) | 8.0 (46.4) | 12.0 (53.6) | 14.3 (57.7) | 16.0 (60.8) | 11.1 (52.0) |
| Record low °C (°F) | 8.9 (48.0) | 5.2 (41.4) | 5.1 (41.2) | 0.4 (32.7) | −2.9 (26.8) | −5.3 (22.5) | −6.8 (19.8) | −5.1 (22.8) | −2.6 (27.3) | 0.2 (32.4) | 1.3 (34.3) | 6.8 (44.2) | −6.8 (19.8) |
| Average precipitation mm (inches) | 184.6 (7.27) | 131.5 (5.18) | 105.0 (4.13) | 26.8 (1.06) | 7.6 (0.30) | 2.3 (0.09) | 3.4 (0.13) | 3.7 (0.15) | 6.8 (0.27) | 23.7 (0.93) | 60.0 (2.36) | 132.5 (5.22) | 688.0 (27.09) |
| Average relative humidity (%) | 78 | 80 | 82 | 81 | 79 | 75 | 68 | 61 | 57 | 60 | 66 | 72 | 72 |
| Mean monthly sunshine hours | 195.3 | 166.7 | 151.9 | 150.0 | 164.3 | 168.0 | 204.6 | 217.0 | 210.0 | 217.0 | 204.0 | 207.7 | 2,256.5 |
| Percentage possible sunshine | 46 | 46 | 40 | 43 | 48 | 53 | 61 | 62 | 58 | 55 | 51 | 49 | 51 |
Source: Instituto Nacional de Tecnología Agropecuaria

== Attractions ==
The city centre features a number of buildings dating back to the 18th and 19th and early 20th centuries. Clockwise around the Ninth of July Square are the neoclassical Cathedral Shrine, the French style Museum of Contemporary Art, the Cabildo (in former times, the city's town hall, nowadays a historical museum) and the neoclassical Museum of High Altitude Archaeology, which houses artifacts from the Inca civilization, including the mummies of three Inca children. The Plaza is almost completely surrounded by a gallery.

Within walking distance of the July 9th Square are the Saint Francis Church and the city's three pedestrian streets: Alberdi, Florida and "Caseros". The three blocks in Balcarce Street closest to the train station are now the centre of night life in Salta, with restaurants, pubs and cafés on both sidewalks and concerts every night.

Rising in the east is San Bernardo Hill. Its summit, from which visitors can get a view of the city and the entire valley, can be reached by car, cable car or stairway.

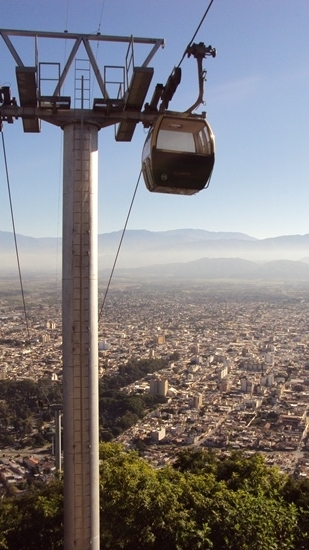
A cable car (gondola) in Salta near Plaza del Lago

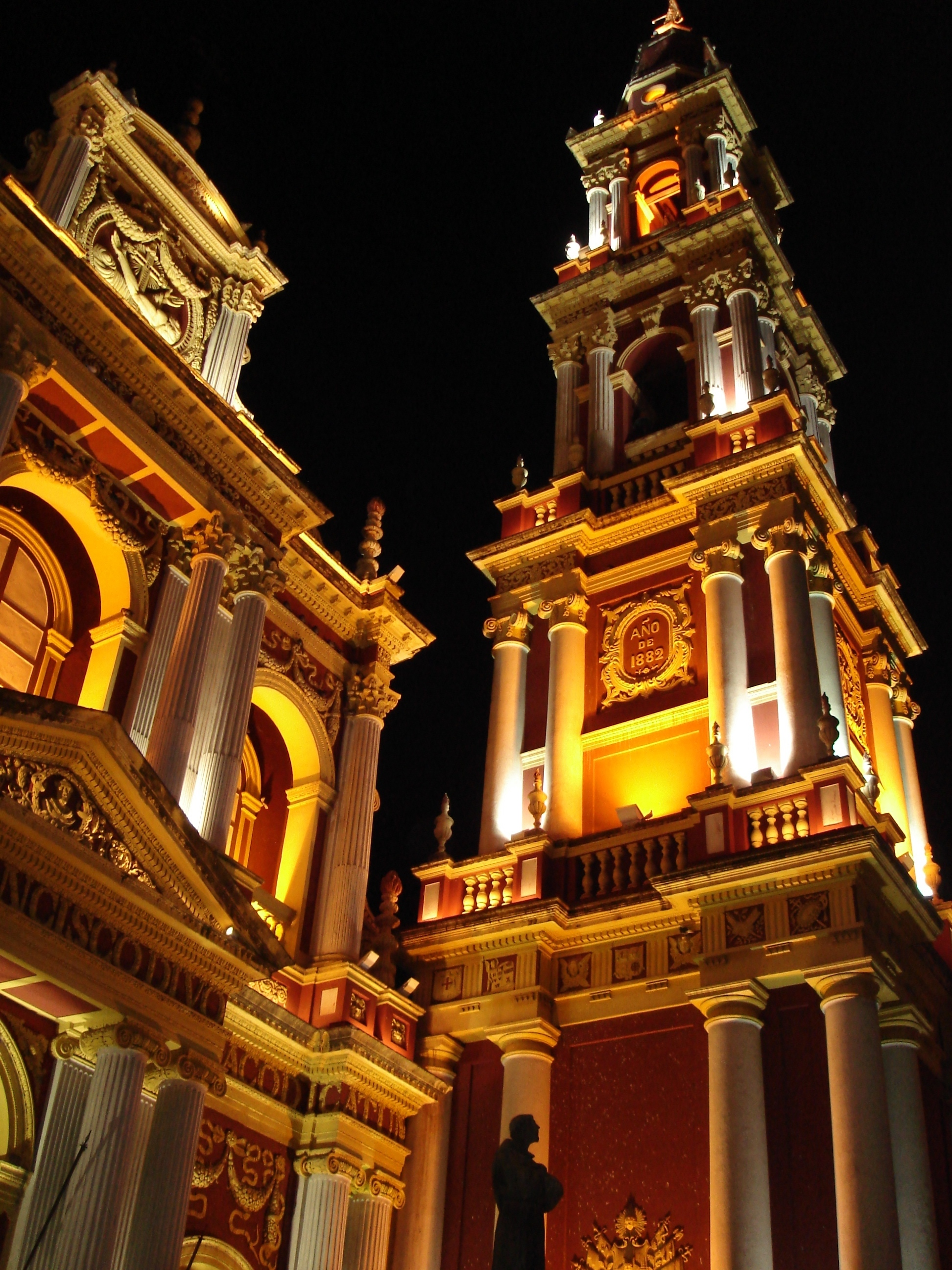
The Church of Saint Francis

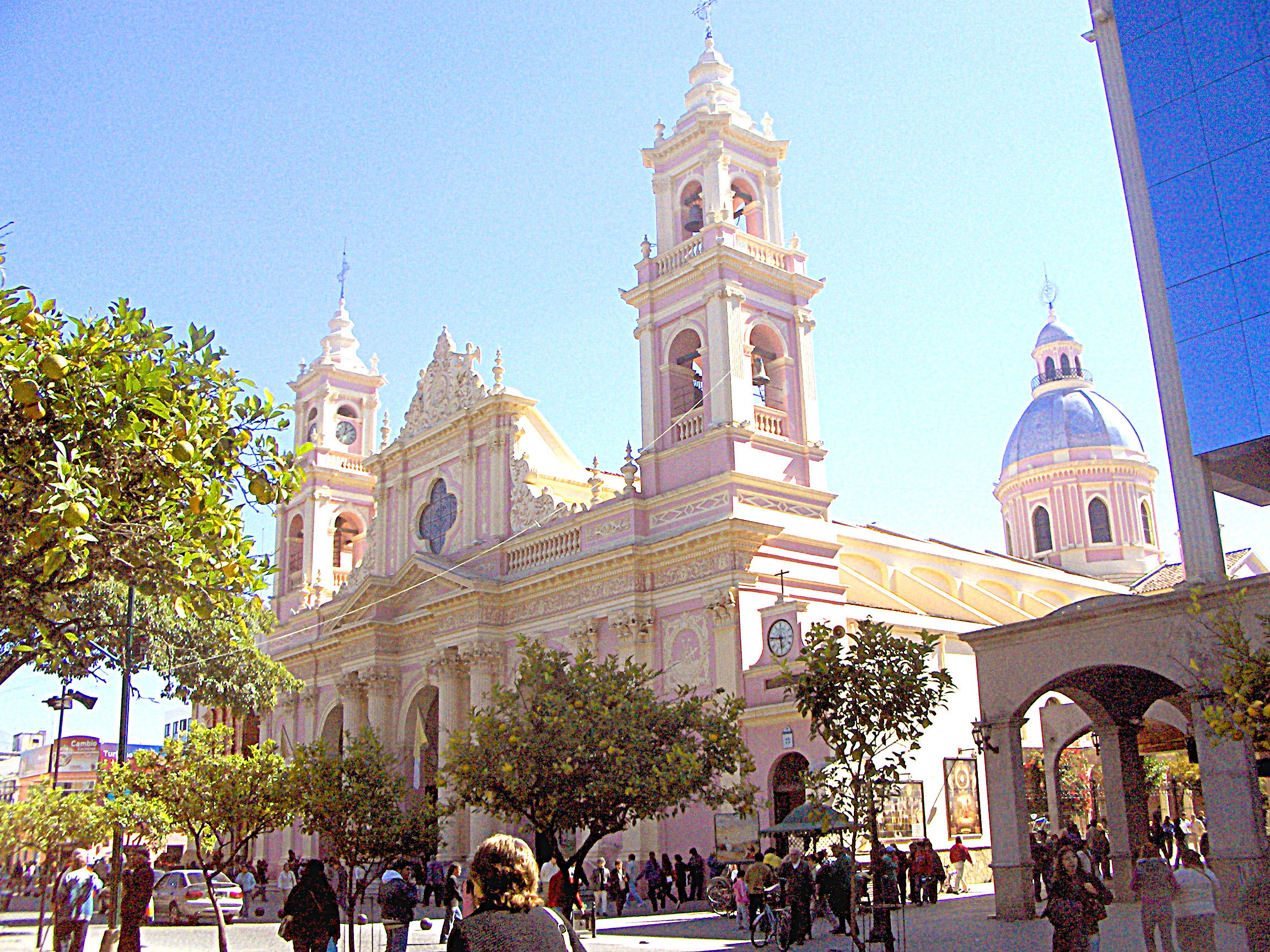
The main cathedral

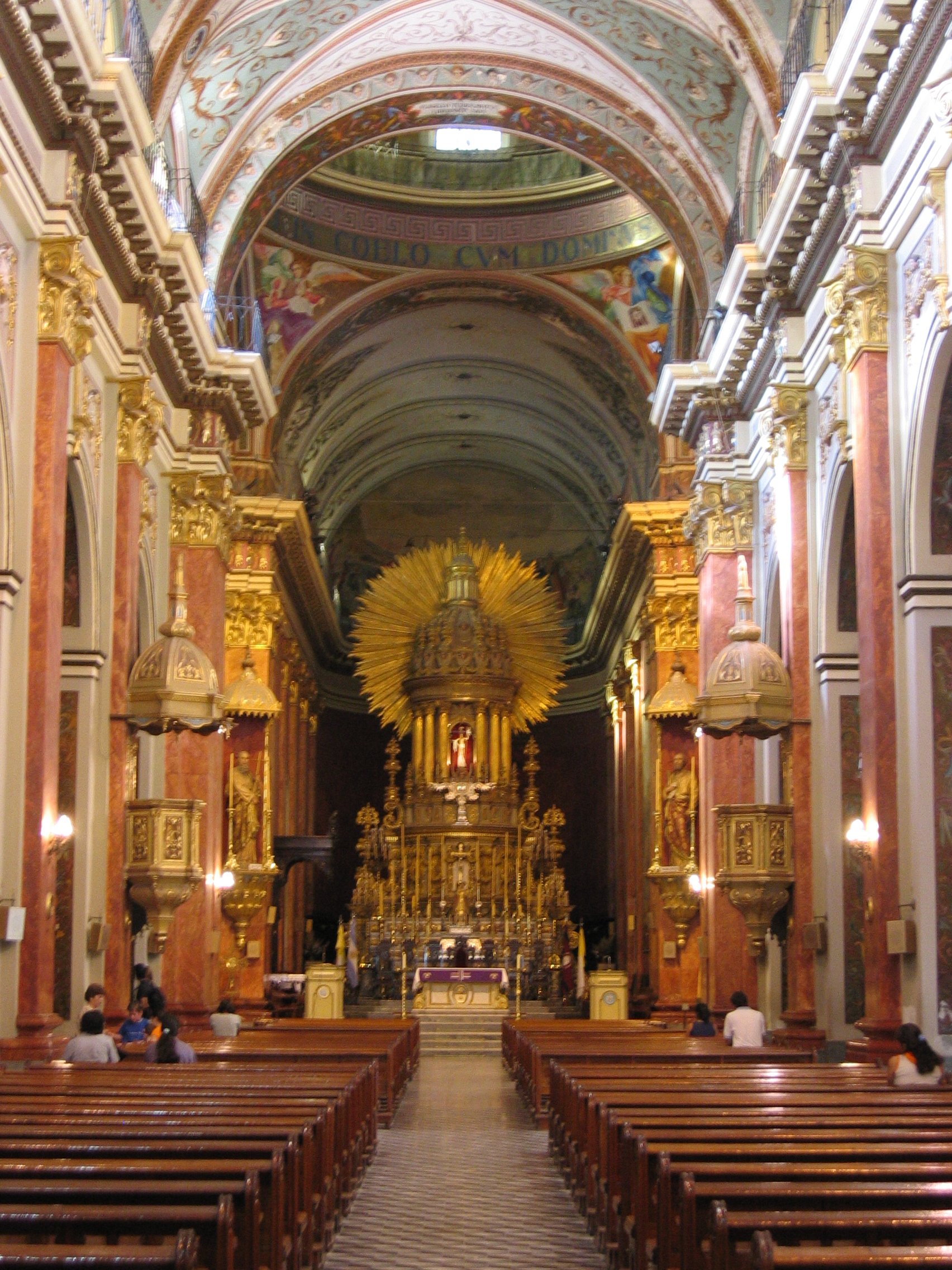
Inside the cathedral

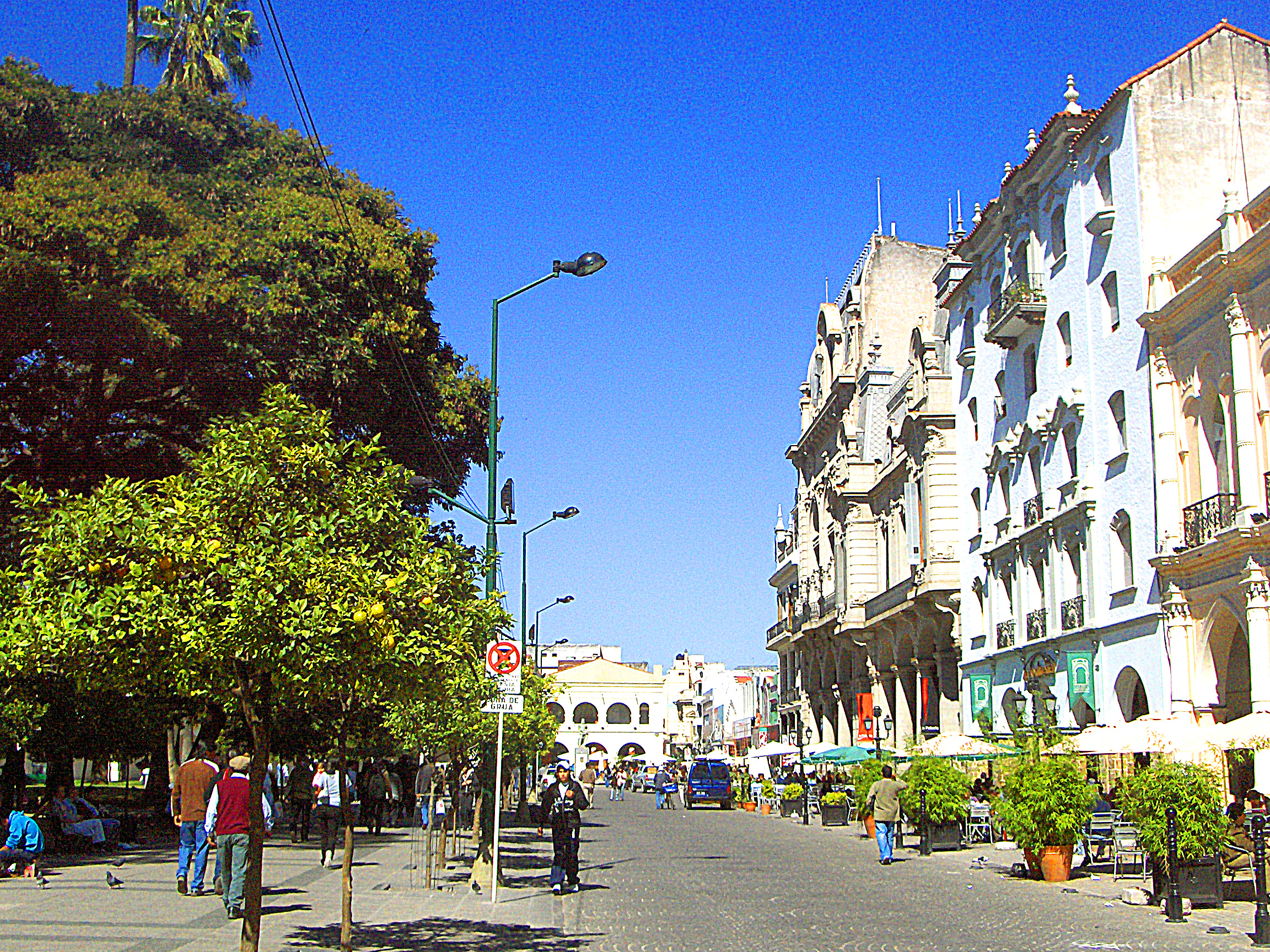
Mitre Street

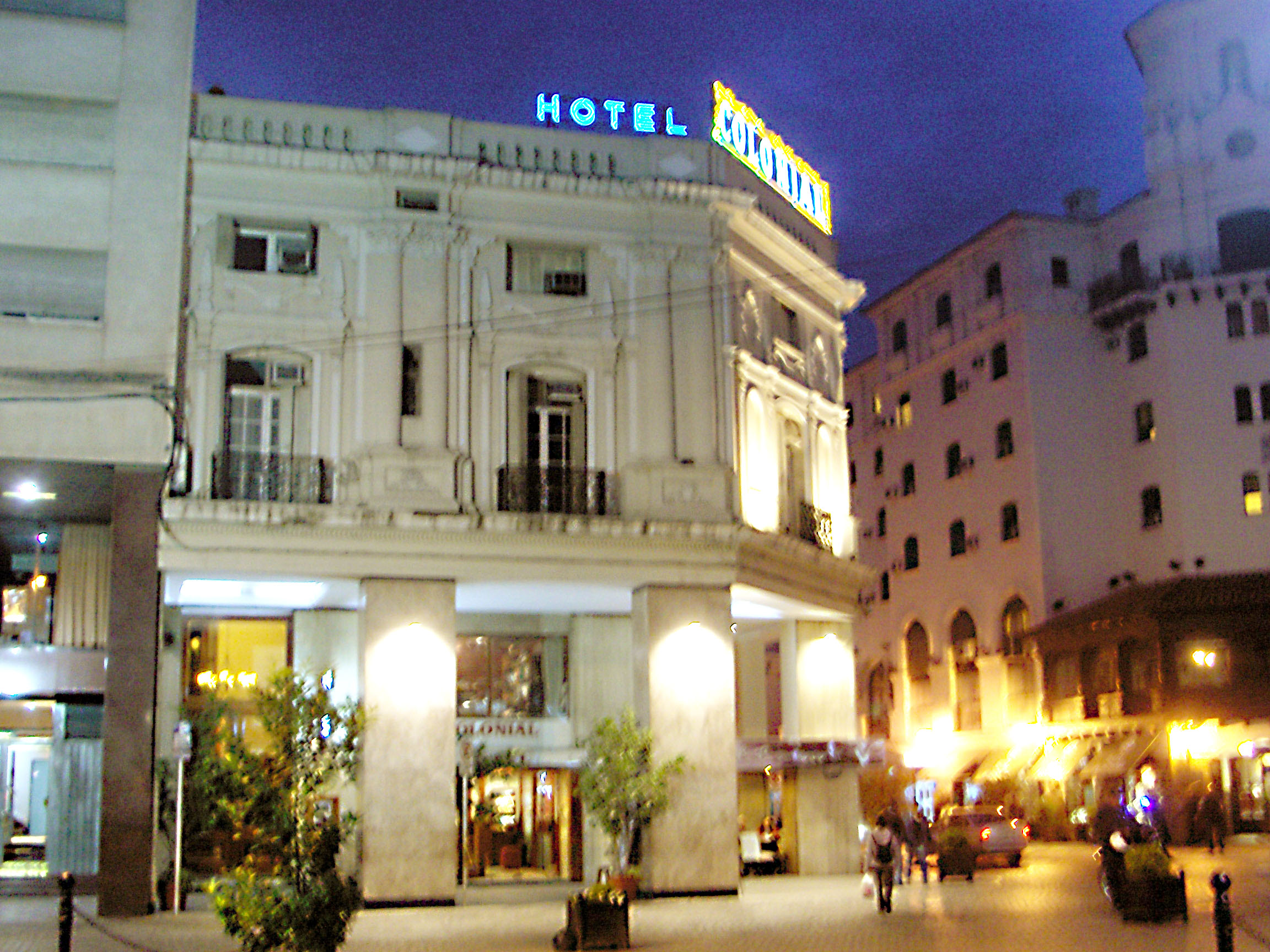
The Colonial Hotel

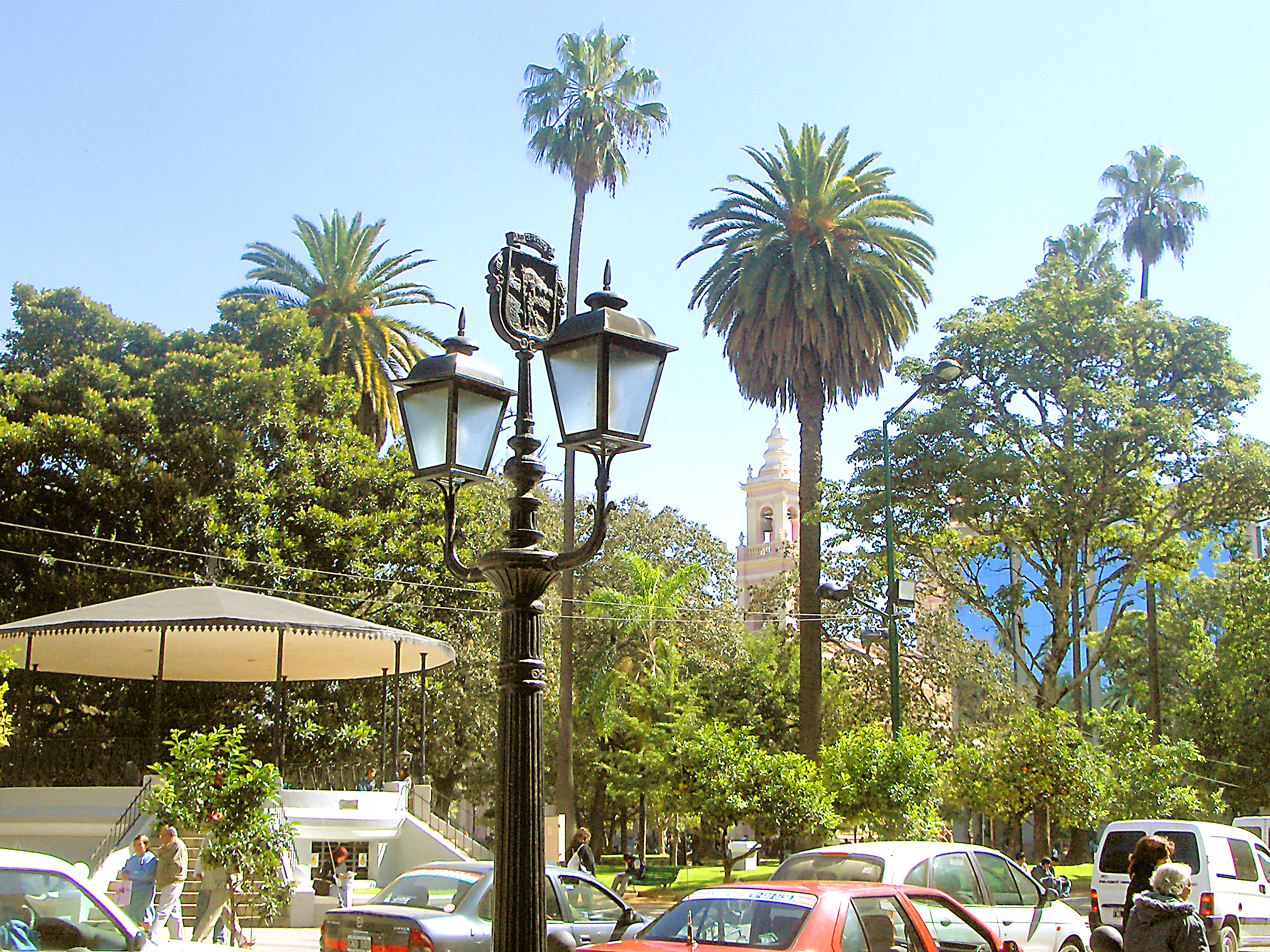
Ninth of July Plaza

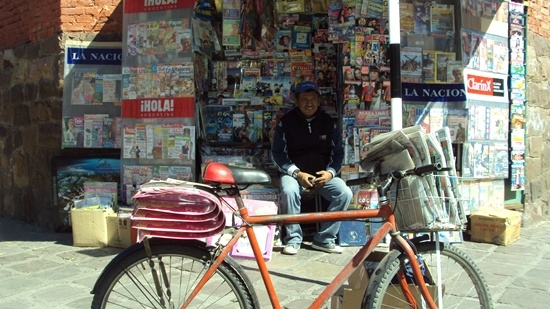
Corner newsstand in Salta

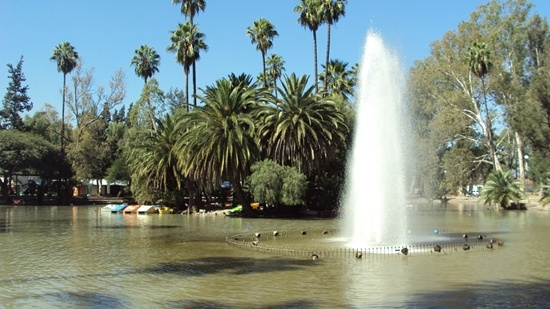
Waterfountain and paddleboats to rent at Plaza del Lago in Salta

== Culture and arts ==
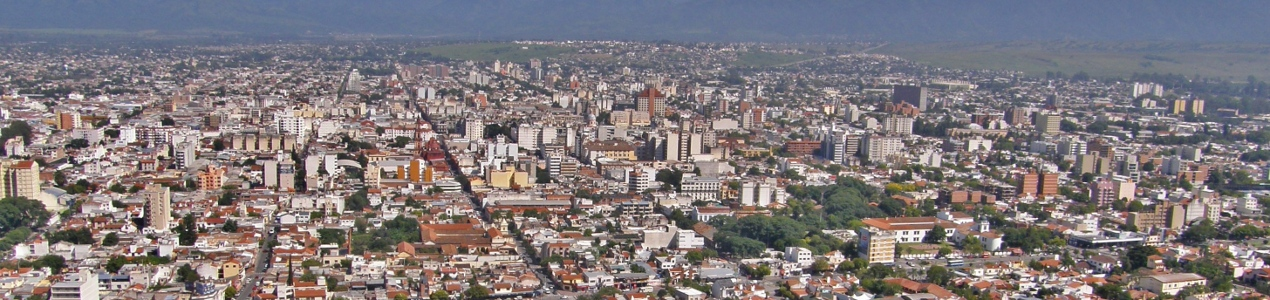
View of Salta, Northwestern Argentina

The local culture is a blend of Spanish and gaucho (mestizo, criollo, both indigenous and non-indigenous) traditions, lending the city a distinctive identity, somewhat different from the more European-like metropolises to the south.

The city boasts three theatres, several museums (one of which exhibits the perfectly preserved bodies of c. 500 year old Inca children sacrificed in the Andes to Inca gods), and a busy calendar of art exhibitions, shows, music festivals, and other cultural events.

One of the main activities in Salta is the April Culture Festival, which lasts the entire month and offers a wide variety of activities such as cultural performances, a handcraft exposition, and live orchestral performances.

== Sports ==
Salta residents, like most Argentines, are very enthusiastic about football. The most important local clubs are Juventud Antoniana, Gimnasia y Tiro de Salta, and Central Norte; many faithful fans follow each. These three clubs currently play in the third national division.

Other locally popular sports include baseball (a game in which Salta players excel nationally), basketball, volleyball, rugby, and mountaineering.

The main sporting venue in Salta is the Padre Ernesto Martearena Stadium; the Gimnasia y Tiro and Juventud Antoniana stadiums also see many athletic matches. The largest roofed facility in the city is the Ciudad de Salta Stadium, chiefly used for basketball, volleyball, and boxing.

Over the last forty years, Salta has played host to such high-profile international sporting events as the 1990 Basketball World Cup, the 1994 Camel Trophy, the 2002 Volleyball World Cup, and the 2009 Hockey Champions Challenge. The Argentina national rugby union team, the "Pumas", have played in Salta against Italy (2005), England (2009), (2013), South Africa (2016) and Scotland (2022). Top football clubs, including Boca Juniors, River Plate and Racing, have played friendly games in Salta in summer, off-season matches.

The city was used as a stage on the route of the 2014 and 2016 Dakar Rally.

== Politics of Salta ==
Salta is governed by a city council of 21 members. Following the elections of November 2013, the Workers' Party has 9 seats, the Justicialist Party has 6 seats, and there are 6 others.

== Trivia ==
- The film Taras Bulba, starring Yul Brynner and Tony Curtis, was largely shot in the hills west of the city, near San Lorenzo.
- Actor John Schneider (The Dukes of Hazzard and Smallville) was part of the cast of Cocaine Wars, another film shot in Salta.
- Two Hollywood celebrities have married Salta natives: Matt Damon (to Luciana Bozán Barroso), and Robert Duvall (to Luciana Pedraza).

== Transportation ==
The city's commercial airline needs are served by Aeropuerto Internacional Martín Miguel de Güemes, with service on three domestic airlines, including Aerolíneas Argentinas, which is Argentina's largest domestic and international air carrier, and low cost airline Flybondi.

== Notable people ==
- Juana Dib (1924-2015), poet, journalist, and teacher
- Carlos Santiago Fayt, academic and judge
- Carlos Ibarguren, academic and politician
- César Isella, folk singer
- Christian Rodrigo Zurita, footballer
- Daniel Tinte, pianist and composer
- David Kavlin, television host
- Dino Saluzzi, bandoneonist and composer
- Emmanuel Cáceres, football player
- Francisco Gabino Arias, explorer and soldier
- Jorge Horacio Brito, banker and businessman
- José Alfredo Martínez de Hoz, former economy minister
- José Evaristo Uriburu, president of Argentina
- José Félix Uriburu, de facto president of Argentina
- Manuela Cornejo Sanchez, composer
- José Valdiviezo, footballer
- Juan Figallo, rugby player
- Juana Manuela Gorriti, feminist writer
- Los Chalchaleros, folk music band
- Los Nocheros, folk music band
- Luciana Pedraza, actress
- Luciano Leccese, footballer
- Lucrecia Martel, film director
- Luís Sillero, footballer
- Mariano Boedo, statesman
- Martín Miguel de Güemes, general
- Martina Silva de Gurruchaga, independence fighter
- Nadia Echazú, human rights activist
- Noemí Goytia, architect and professor
- Renato Riggio, footballer
- Robustiano Patrón Costas, infamous sugar tycoon
- Sara Solá de Castellanos, wrote the lyrics of the hymn of the city of Salta.
- Victorino de la Plaza, politician, president of Argentina
- Walter Busse, footballer
- Wilfred Benítez, Puerto Rican boxer

== See also ==
- 2010 Salta earthquake
- Argentina wine
- Salta–Antofagasta railway
- Torrontes
