= Luciano Pereyra =

Argentine singer

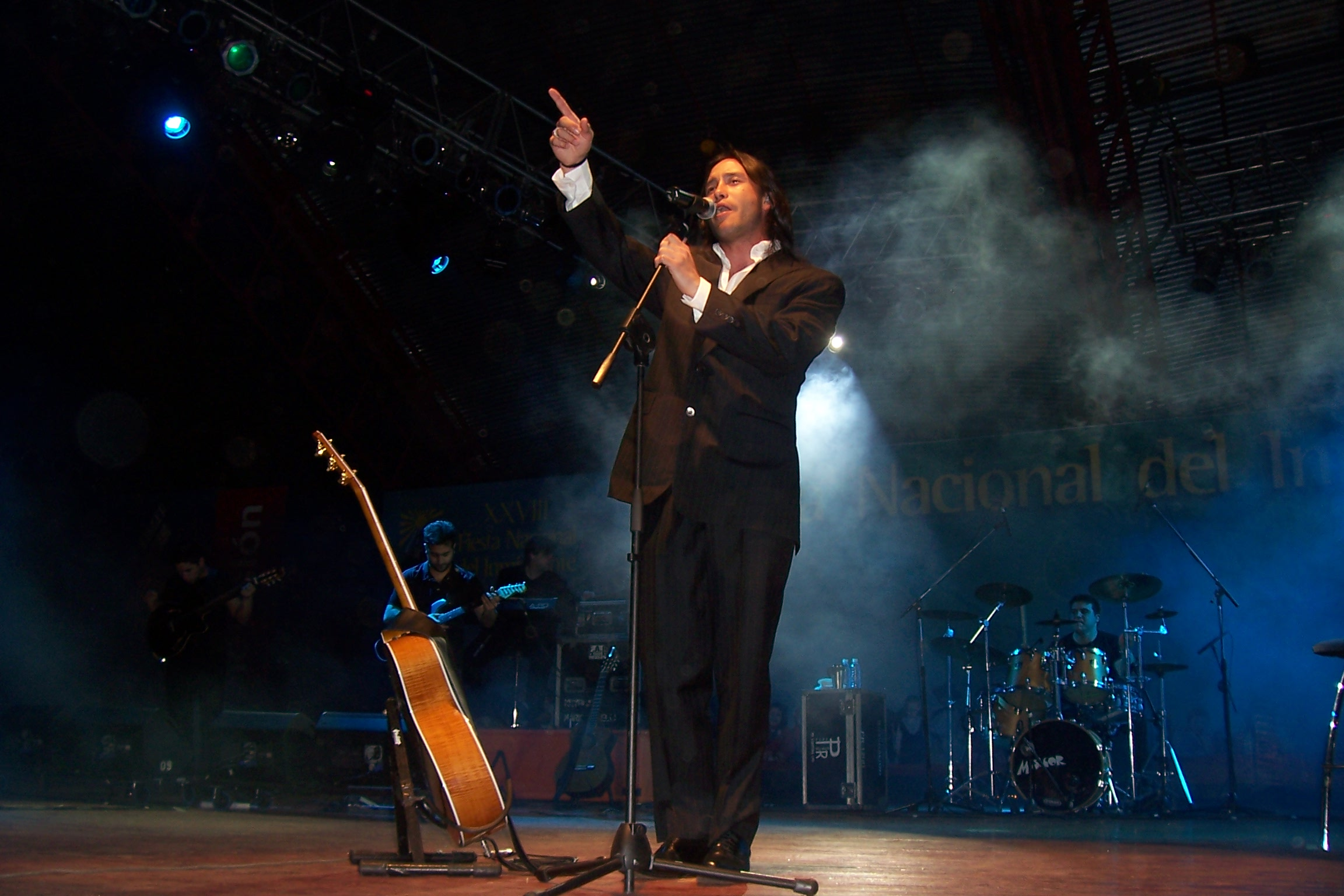

Background information
- Born: September 21, 1981 (age 44)
- Origin: Carmensa, General Alvear, Argentina
- Genres: Folk, Latin pop
- Occupations: singer, songwriter
- Instruments: Guitar, piano, singing
- Years active: 1998 - present
- Labels: EMI Music (1998-2009); Del Ángel Feg S.R.L., distributed by Sony Music (2010-2014); Universal Music (2014-present)
- Website: http://www.lucianopereyra.com/

Luciano Ariel Pereyra (born September 21, 1981) is an Argentine singer-songwriter.

== Biography ==
In 1984, when he was three years old, his parents noticed his talent for music and gave him a guitar for Christmas. The following year, he competed in a television program on ATC. At the age of 9, he participated in Festilindo, a program for children performing. When he was 9, he sang the song "Sólo le pido a Dios" by León Gieco in Xuxa's TV program. This song made him famous in 2000 when sang it for Pope John Paul II in the Vatican City, representing Latin America in the Jubilee Youth.

== Music ==
Pereyra recorded his first album in 1998 called Amaneciendo (Dawning), an album containing 13 songs mixing zambas, carnavalitos, waltzes, ballads and chacareras. His first hit was called "Soy un inconsciente" (I'm reckless); this single eventually went quadruple platinum. In 1999, he performed a recital in Buenos Aires at the Teatro Opera.

In March 2000, his second album was released: Recordándote (Remembering You), including the song "Sólo le pido a Dios" (I only ask of God) and songs written by himself. The record was at the top of the national ranking for three consecutive weeks. One year later, he was chosen to sing the Argentine National Anthem during the farewell match tribute to Diego Maradona.

He has sung duets with artists such as Rodrigo Bueno, Soledad Pastorutti and Alejandro Lerner. In June 2002, Pereyra released his third album entitled Soy Tuyo (I'm yours) a disc that contains a bolero and tango influence. He toured South America and performed concerts for six nights at the Teatro Gran Rex.

In 2003, Pereyra participated in the film Tus ojos brillaban (Your eyes sparkled). On June 22 of the same year he released Luciano, with songs written by himself such as "Perdóname" (Forgive Me).

In November, 2006, he released the album Dispuesto a amarte (Willing to Love You), the fifth album of his career with a romantic song titled "Porque aún te amo" (Because I Still Love You) as a big hit.

In November 2008, Luciano Pereyra released the song "No puedo" (I can't), written and composed by Pereyra. The corresponding music video featured the model Florencia Torrente, and was influenced by Rudy Pérez, a producer and composer who had worked with artists such as Cristian Castro, Chayanne, Luis Fonsi, and Luis Miguel.

== Awards ==
- Consagración, National Festival of Dressage and Folklore Jesus Maria (1999).
- Revelación, Festival Baradero (1999).
- Consagración, Cosquín Festival (2000).
