= Francisco Gabino Arias =

Argentine explorer and soldier

Francisco Gabino Arias (1752, Salta, Argentina – 1808) was an Argentine explorer and soldier.

== Biography ==
In 1774, when a colonel in the army, he explored the Gran Chaco desert. On June 3, 1780, he undertook an expedition to pacify the indigenous population, which lasted until January 31, 1781. In 1782 he explored the Bermejo River, and proved that it flowed into the Paraguay River and not into the Paraná River, as had formerly been supposed. He also gave valuable information about the navigability of the river and the character of the tribes living near it. His narrative of this expedition was published by his son, José Antonio Arias, by order of the government.
