= Pibes Chorros =

Argentine cumbia villera band

Pibes Chorros is an Argentine cumbia villera group founded in 2001 in the city of Berazategui by keyboardist and singer Ariel "el traidor" Salinas. The theme of their lyrics, with a high violent content, quickly captured the attention of the public in the first stage of the group.

The lyrics address aspects of the delinquent marginality of Argentina in the late 1990s. The cultural habits of these sectors found a channel of expression in the music market and its corresponding aesthetic movement.

Together with Yerba Brava, Mala Fama, Pala Ancha and Damas Gratis they are considered the greatest exponents of the genre and together with the latter, the leaders in popularity throughout the country between 2001 and 2005 when there was also a rivalry product of the bad relationship between Ariel "el traidor" and Pablo Lescano.

== History ==
Los Pibes Chorros emerged in early 2000 from the recently disintegrated group Los Chudas led by Ariel el Traidor and the economic production of Magenta Discos that became interested in the talented band, due to the rise of the Movida Tropical that had been generated in Argentina since the 1990s.

With their most transgressive music and without subtle phrases, they threw themselves into music, talking about drugs, sex and crime. Along with the launch of their first songs, they began to be heard on the radios and also on dance nights in Buenos Aires, and even in the interior of the country and countries such as Paraguay, Chile and Uruguay.

Ariel Salinas always imagined how far his group could go, he expected the overwhelming success he has had. Young people listened to them and followed them because they identified with their music and lyrics.

=== Leadership of "Ariel el Traidor" ===
The first album was released in 2001 and was called "Arriba Las Manos", with popular songs like "Andrea", "El tano Pastita" and "Duraznito". The album became a Gold Record in three weeks and the media estimated that for each original CD, there were six illegal copies.

It was followed in 2002 by a new album called "Solo le pido a Dios", with the hit "La Lechera", in addition to other songs such as "El Prisionero", "Mabel", "Llegamos Los Pibes Chorros", and the version of León Gieco's song "Solo le pido a Dios", which gives the name of the album.

Their success was so great that they even appeared on television, they could be seen in the telenovela of Channel 13 of Argentina "Son amores", together with the band of the Marquesi brothers (Mariano Martínez), also with Natalia Oreiro in the telenovela "Muñeca Brava" and in "Mar de Fondo" with Alejandro Fantino, among other successful programs of the moment.

Then in 2002 came their live album, called "Live ... Hasta la Muerte", where they presented their songs "El Pibe Tripa", "Maria Esther" and "La Danza Chorra". The following year, in 2003, they released a new album called "Criando Cuervos" with songs that to this day continue to sound in the scene such as "Las Pibas Quieren Sexo", "Que Calor" and "Carolina". Record that they came to present throughout Argentina and also in Paraguay, Brazil and Uruguay.

In 2004 his fourth and last album with the traitor went on sale; "El Poder de la Guadaña" with the songs "Colate un Dedo", "Mala Mujer" and "Pamela".

=== Salina's departure ===
In 2005, Ariel "El Traidor" left the group after repeated discussions with the record company and private conflicts with the rest of his companions, both related to financial reasons. Mario Monzón accepted Ariel's offer and also left the group, joining Ariel's solo project as a musician named 'El traidor y los pibes' .

But this did not separate the band that continued working and recording with their new vocalist Víctor Loizatti. In 2012 Loizatti left the band and an old acquaintance returned, Gonzalo "El Pollo" Villa.

== Discography ==
Studio albums

Año	Álbum	Discográfica
2001	Arriba las manos	Magenta Discos
2002	Solo le pido a Dios	Magenta Discos
2003	Criando cuervos	Magenta Discos
2004	El poder de la guadaña	Magenta Discos
2007	Perdónalos, no saben lo que hacen	Magenta Discos
2009	Material de difusión	Magenta Discos
2013	Ojo x Ojo	Magenta Discos

Live albums

- En Vivo...Hasta La Muerte, 2002.
