= Piola Vago =

Argentinian band

Piola Vago are a Cumbia Villera ("shantytown cumbia") band from Buenos Aires, Argentina. The band started in the slums of Villa de Los Andes (Fuerte Apache). Their line-up includes famous Argentina and Boca Juniors football player Carlos Tevez and his brother Diego.
