= Sólo le pido a Dios =

Famous protest song written by León Gieco

Sólo le pido a Dios (in English: I only ask of God) is a famous protest song, written by Argentine singer-songwriter León Gieco. It is the first song of Gieco's 1978 album, 4to. LP.

== History ==
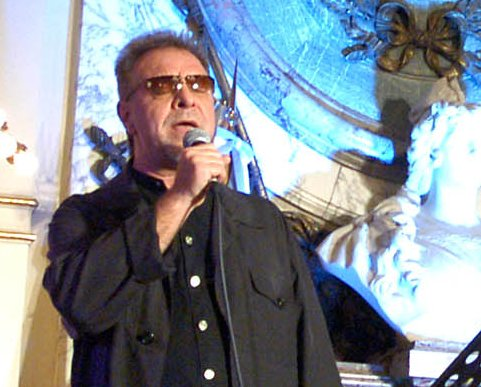
León Gieco, author of the song.

Gieco wrote it in 1978, at his parents' house in his childhood village of Cañada Rosquín, a small town in the north of Santa Fe Province, Argentina. He wrote it in the presence of his father, who told him that the song would be "world-renowned", which it eventually was. Gieco composed this song by first trying out melodies with his harmonica and guitar, then writing personal feelings which gradually turned into phrases inspired by the harsh social events of the time, such as the military dictatorship of his country, Mercedes Sosa’s exile, and the threat of war between Chile and Argentina at the time.

Gieco doubted whether or not to include the song on his 1978 album 4to. LP, believing it was "boring and monotonous", but finally did, following the advice of Charly García. Thereafter, Gieco sang it as his closing song and has played it in all his national and international tours.

Since then it has been interpreted by various artists, both from Argentina and around the world.

== Versions ==
This song has been covered by various artists around the world and translated into more than twenty-five languages, including English, Portuguese, Basque, German, Quechua, Catalan, Persian, Arabic, Armenian, Hebrew.

- León Gieco
- Ana Belén
- Antonio Flores
- Beth Carvalho
- Emma Shapplin
- Fiel a la Vega
- Florent Pagny
- Gervasio
- Ginevra Di Marco
- Imca Marina
- Javiera y Los Imposibles
- Joan Manuel Serrat
- Juan Diego Flórez
- Luciano Pereyra
- Mercedes Sosa
- Miguel Ríos
- Nicole
- Mario Guerrero
- Kata
- Leo Rey
- Outlandish
- Bruce Springsteen
- Paulina Rubio
- Pete Seeger
- Pibes Chorros
- Piero De Benedictis
- Raúl Porchetto
- Sergio Denis
- Sixto Palavecino
- Shakira
- Tania Libertad
- Kleiton e Kledir
- U2
- Víctor Heredia
- Víctor Manuel

== See also ==
- National Reorganization Process
- Mercedes Sosa
