= Los Palmeras =

Argentine cumbia band

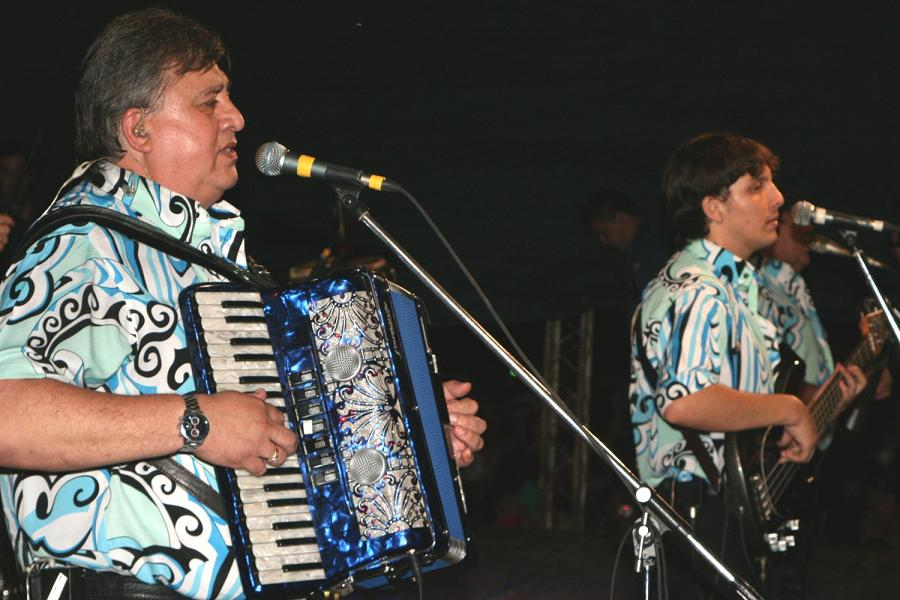
Marcos Camino, accordionist with Los Palmeras

Los Palmeras are an Argentine cumbia band from Santa Fe, Argentina founded in 1972. With a career spanning more than five decades, their success began in the late 1970s and early 1980.

In 1978, Popowicz was dismissed from the group, and Rubén Deicas took his place. That same year, they recorded "Morenita cumbiambera", the first album to feature Deicas on vocals. Their fourth album, "Basta de orgullo", was also released that year.

Throughout their career, they became renowned within Argentina musical culture for hits such as "El Bombón Asesino," "Olvídala," "Soy Sabalero," "Doble Vida," and "Títere," among many others. In 1999 and 2000, they won the Clave del Sol Award for Best Group from the Interior of the Country. In 2008, they received a Gardel Award for Best Tropical Group Album. In 2015, they were honored with a Platinum Konex Award in the Tropical/Cuarteto genre, and in 2017, they once again won a Gardel Award for Best Tropical Group Album.

In February 2026, Marcos Camino announced his retirement from the band, citing health issues and his advanced age, and handed over leadership of the group to his son, Marcos Camino Jr. In March, they released their first medley featuring their new vocalist, Lucas Delfrate, who shares the role with Pablo López. Lucas had previously served as a vocalist for the band "Los Palmeras"—led by Camino Jr.—in 2025. On November 10, 2026, Marcos Camino (the father) died by suicide at the age of 76; he hanged himself in his recording studio in the city of Santa Fe.

== Discography ==
Album	Year	Record label
Volumen 1	1976	MRG
Te regalaré mi vida	1977	MRG
Morenita cumbiambera	1978	MRG
Basta de orgullo	1978	MRG
Nadie quede sin bailar	1979	MRG
Saboreando cumbias	1980	MRG
Los Preferidos del Ritmo Caliente junto a Yuli y los Girasoles y Los del Bohio	1981	MRG
Alegría con Los Palmeras	1982	Microfon
A bailar chamamerengues	1982	Microfon
Cumbia y luna	1983	Microfon
Quiero un pueblo que baile	1984	Microfon
Fiesta en la selva	1986	Microfon
Por siempre	1986	Microfon
Corazón no me preguntes	1986	Microfon
Cálida expresion	1987	Microfon
Loquito por ti	1988	Microfon
Rumor de cumbia	1989	Microfon
Sus amigos	1989	CBS
Chiquita pero buena	1990	CBS
Boquita azucarada	1991	Sony Music
20 Años	1992	Sony Music
20 Años vol. 2	1992	Sony Music
Ayer, hoy y siempre	1993	BMG
Tropibaile santafesino junto a Los del Bohio, Los Lirios, Grupo Alegría, La Pandilla 4/20 y Los del Málaga	1994	Magenta
Todo el mundo necesita amor	1994	BMG
Fiesta descontrolada	1995	BMG
Meneala	1995	BMG
El rey de la parranda	1996	BMG
Un toque diferente	1997	Leader
El sonido original	1998	Leader
Volo la paloma	1999	Leader
Irreemplazambles	2000	Leader
Cuando el amor se daña	2001	Leader
30 Años	2002	Leader
Así es la vida	2003	SFR
Un sentimiento	2004	SFR
Te va a gustar	2005	SFR
La fiesta en vivo	2006	SFR
El bombón asesino	2006	SFR
Un clásico	2007	SFR
Sin fronteras	2009	SFR
Una nueva vida	2010	Garra
Éxitos for export	2011	SFR
40 Años	2012	SFR
Simplemente	2014	SFR
