= Pablo Lescano =

Argentine musician (born 1977)

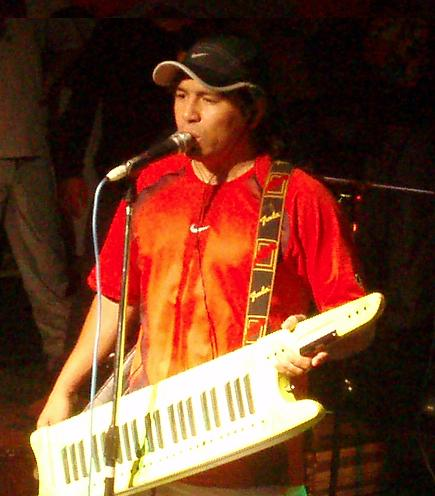
- Lescano in 2011

Background information
- Also known as: Pablito Lescano
- Born: San Fernando, Buenos Aires
- Genres: Cumbia villera
- Occupations: Musician; composer
- Instruments: Vocals; keytar
- Years active: 1995–present
- Label: EMI
- Member of: Damas Gratis
- Website: pablitolescano.com

Pablo Sebastián Lescano (born 8 December 1977) is an Argentine singer, composer, keyboardist, and leader of Cumbia villera group Damas Gratis from 2000. He is considered by many as the founder of the Cumbia villera sub-genre.

== Biography ==
Born in 1977 in Villa La Esperanza, a poor suburb of Buenos Aires, Pablo Lescano made his first musical experience at the age of 13 years on a stolen Keyboard. As a youth he was active in several local cumbia bands until his 1997 commercial breakthrough with the band Amar Azul. He succeeded both as a keyboardist and as a composer of many of the bands' songs.

With the money from royalties from the success of Amar Azul, Lescano set about building his own studio. In 1999, he concretized plans to create a new form of cumbia, which should be the voice of slum dwellers Argentina. He built around the singer Daniel Lescano, the band Flor de Piedra on which new paths went in text and sound: The text negotiated by the lives of slum kids, drug use, crime and sex, and the music integrated elements of techno and trance in traditional cumbia dance.

Flor de Piedra was commercially very successful, so Lescano tackled another project in 2000: the band Damas Gratis, where he was also active as a singer, but more centrally as the group's producer. This band revolutionized the cumbia villera sound, and was another commercial success for Lescano, winning him several music awards including the Premios Gardel.

In 2001, Lescano helmed two other bands as a producer under contract: Jimmy y su Combo Negro, a parody of the traditional Colombian cumbia, and Amar y Yo, which is criticized for its sexist lyrics.

== Discography ==
=== with Amar Azul ===
- Dime tú (1996)
- Cumbia Nena (1997)
- Gracias a vos (1999)
- Amaremix (Remix-Album, 1999)

=== with Flor de Piedra ===
- La vanda mas loca (1999)
- Más duros que nunca (2000)

=== with Damas Gratis ===
- Para los Píbes (2000)
- En vivo... hasta las manos (Livealbum, 2000)
- Operación Damas Gratis (2001)
- 100 % Negro Cumbiero (Livealbum, 2003)
- En vivo 2004 (Livealbum, 2004)
- Sin Remedio (2005)
- Sólo para entendidos (2007)
- La gota que rebalsó el vaso (2008)
- 10 Años de Oro (Livealbum, 2009)
- Esquivando el éxito (2011)
- Somos nosotros los buenos (2016)

=== with Dany y la Roka ===
- One (2001)

=== with Amar y Yo ===
- Cumbia Gurisa Baila Petisa (2001)

=== with Jimmy y su Combo Negro ===
- Homenaje a Colombia (2001)

=== Collaborations ===
- La Luz del Ritmo – Los Fabulosos Cadillacs (2008)
- On the Rock – Andrés Calamaro (2010)
