= Luciano Leccese =

Argentine footballer

Personal information
- Full name: Luciano Gabriel Leccese
- Date of birth: September 1, 1982 (age 44)
- Place of birth: Salta, Argentina
- Height: 1.87 m (6 ft 2 in)
- Position: Striker

Team information
- Current team: Lupa Roma

Senior career*
| Years | Team | Apps | (Gls) |
| 2003–2004 | Concepción | | |
| 2004–2005 | Gimnasia y Tiro | | |
| 2005 | Águilas Riviera Maya | 16 | (6) |
| 2006 | Salamanca | 13 | (3) |
| 2006 | Central Norte | | |
| 2007 | Talleres (RE) | | |
| 2007–2009 | Cassino | 45 | (5) |
| 2009–2010 | Luco Canistro | 20 | (13) |
| 2010–2011 | L'Aquila | 12 | (0) |
| 2011 | → Fano (loan) | 3 | (0) |
| 2011– | Lupa Frascati | 20 | (7) |
- * Club domestic league appearances and goals as of 3 February 2012

Luciano Gabriel Leccese (born 1 September 1982 in Salta) is an Argentine professional footballer who currently plays for Lupa Roma.

== Career ==
He played on the professional level in Primera División A for Salamanca FC and Águilas Riviera Maya.

In August 2010, he was signed by Italian Seconda Divisione club L'Aquila.

In January 2011 he was signed by Fano.

In the 2011–12 season, Leccese plays with Eccellenza side Lupa Frascati.
