= Cumbia villera =

Subgenre of cumbia music from Argentina

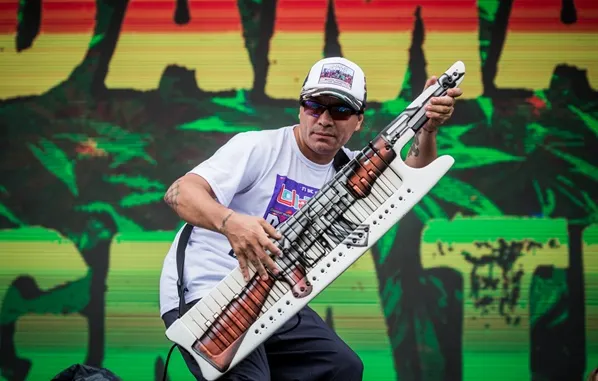
- Pablo Lescano, a cumbia villera musician, performing in 2023
- Stylistic origins: Argentine cumbia; Peruvian cumbia
- Cultural origins: Peruvian immigration to Argentinian villas miserias in the late 1990s
- Typical instruments: Keytar; güira; accordion; bongo drum; guitar; bass guitar; timbales

Cumbia villera ([ˈkumbja βiˈʎeɾa]) (roughly translated as "slum cumbia", "ghetto cumbia", or "shantytown cumbia", from villa miseria, "slum") is a subgenre of cumbia music originating in Argentina in the late 1990s and popularized all over Latin America and Latin communities abroad.

Lyrically, cumbia villera uses the vocabulary of the marginal and lower classes, like the Argentine lunfardo and lenguaje tumbero ("gangster language" or "thug language"), and deals with themes such as the everyday life in the villas miseria (slums), poverty and misery, the use of hard drugs, promiscuity and/or prostitution, nights out at boliches (discos and clubs) that play cumbia and other tropical music genres (such as the emblematic Tropitango venue in Pacheco), the football culture of the barras bravas, delinquency and clashes with the police and other forms of authority, antipathy towards politicians, and authenticity in being true villeros (inhabitants of the villas).

Musically, cumbia villera bases its sound in a heavy use of synthesizers, sound effects, keyboard voices, keytars, electronic drums, and other elements from electric instruments. Cumbia villera's characteristic sound was created using influences from Colombian and Peruvian cumbia, cumbia sonidera and cumbia santafesina in the realm of cumbia, and from reggae, ska, Argentine folklore, and electronic music in other music genres. Lastly, the creator of cumbia villera, Pablo Lescano, admitted that his lyrics were influenced by bands from Argentine punk rock, like 2 Minutos and Argentine rock rolinga, like Viejas Locas. Over time, the genre has evolved, bands and artists have explored different sounds, and new fusions have arisen, such as cumbia rapera, with Bajo Palabra mixing cumbia villera with hip hop, and tropipunk, with Kumbia Queers mixing cumbia villera with punk.

For its characteristics, cumbia villera has been compared to gangsta rap, reggaeton, rock rolinga, raggamuffin, baile funk, and narcocorrido, among other music genres.

== History ==
Cumbia villera was born in the late 1990s, amid an economic and social decline in Argentina. The introduction of neoliberal economics in Argentina in the early '90s gave a quick boost to the nation's economy but progressively marginalized large areas of society, and by the late '90s, Argentina was in a great depression. Some of the most affected by this crisis were workers and the lower classes, and among them were the inhabitant and dwellers of the villas miseria (slums or shantytowns) in Buenos Aires and its metropolitan area, which favoured cumbia and other tropical music genres. However, through the '90s, Argentine cumbia bands such as Grupo Sombras or Grupo Green didn't touch social issues, and in fact, their lyrics were limited to themes such as love or partying.

It was in this situation that in 1999, the first cumbia villera band was born in the depths of Villa La Esperanza, a slum in San Fernando, Buenos Aires (in the north of the Buenos Aires metropolitan area). Pablo Lescano, then keytarist from one of these cumbia bands, Amar Azul, started to pen new songs with more aggressive lyrics. His band rejected them, so he began saving money from the royalties he earned from Amar Azul songs in order to buy instruments and equipment for producing an independent record. He created a new group with a different aesthetic, different lyrics, and a different sound, Flor de Piedra. In his new project, Lescano limited himself to songwriting and managing. Flor de Piedra released the first cumbia villera album, La Vanda Más Loca, by sending the master to a pirate broadcaster due to lack of interest from major record companies. When the song used as the promotional single and first cumbia villera song, "Vos Sos Un Botón", started to dominate the airwaves, the Leader Music label grew interested in the band.

The group's records began to receive heavy airplay, and soon the poor, the marginalized, and the unemployed identified with the new musical genre, and cumbia villera spread to other large urban settlements, eventually rising to popularity across Argentina. By 2000, dozens of cumbia villera bands were playing and recording, one of which was another Lescano project, Damas Gratis, which he formed after a motorbike accident that cost him his place in Amar Azul.

Other bands also went beyond the original foundations of Flor de Piedra and started to explore new sounds and themes, borrowing elements from rock (Los Gedes) or classical (Mala Fama), and writing lyrics that were either more socially conscious (Guachín) or radically aggressive (Pibes Chorros). The crisis that exploded in 2001 in Argentina strongly boosted cumbia villera's popularity and solidified it as an Argentinian icon.

It was at this point that some of the most popular albums in the history of cumbia villera were released, including Ritmo sustancia by Mala Fama (2000), 100% Villero by Yerba Brava (2001), and Sólo Le Pido A Dios by Pibes Chorros (2002). The genre and its repercussions were widely discussed in the mainstream media, with debates in major newspapers, magazines, TV shows, and radio shows, and the phenomenon even reached television, with Tumberos (2002), and film, with El bonaerense (2002) and El polaquito (2003).

Cumbia villera bands began touring neighbouring countries, North America, and Europe, spreading the genre beyond its original boundaries. This "Argentine invasion" influenced artists in other countries, including Uruguay (La Clave), Paraguay (Los Rebeldes), Bolivia (Diego Soria), Chile (Buena Huacho), and Mexico (Cumbia Zero), which contributed musically to the genre by incorporating different regional styles and influences as well as local vocabulary and slang.

Trends in Argentine cumbia started to change by 2003, owing to the election of president Néstor Kirchner and the subsequent improvement in the nation's economy. Additionally, the Argentine music industry began to pressure bands to stop using controversial lyrics, and censorship from broadcasters and the COMFER reduced cumbia villera's prevalence. Christian advocacy in the villas also contributed to these changes. Newer cumbia villera bands, such as La Base and El Original, mostly avoided controversial themes and instead sang about love, naming their style cumbia base to avoid some of the stigma that cumbia villera had acquired.

Through the first decade of the 2000s, cumbia villera continued to have a stronghold among workers and poor communities all over Latin America, with new bands forming each year. The biggest names in the genre continued to tour, including Damas Gratis and Pibes Chorros. As late as 2007, 30% of total sales in the Argentine music industry were from cumbia villera records. However, the genre's predominance and influence in Latin America decreased with the rise of reggaeton in the mid-2000s, and bachata and cumbia wachiturra in the 2010s.

In the 2010s, promotion of cumbia villera bands by mainstream music publications like Rolling Stone, the organization of concerts at popular venues, and the close collaboration and financial production of cumbia villera bands by mainstream musicians such as Andrés Calamaro, Vicentico, and Fidel Nadal suggested that the genre was alive and well.

Cumbia villera has been considered the most aggressive, defiant, and socially conscious style of cumbia ever made.

== Circumstances ==
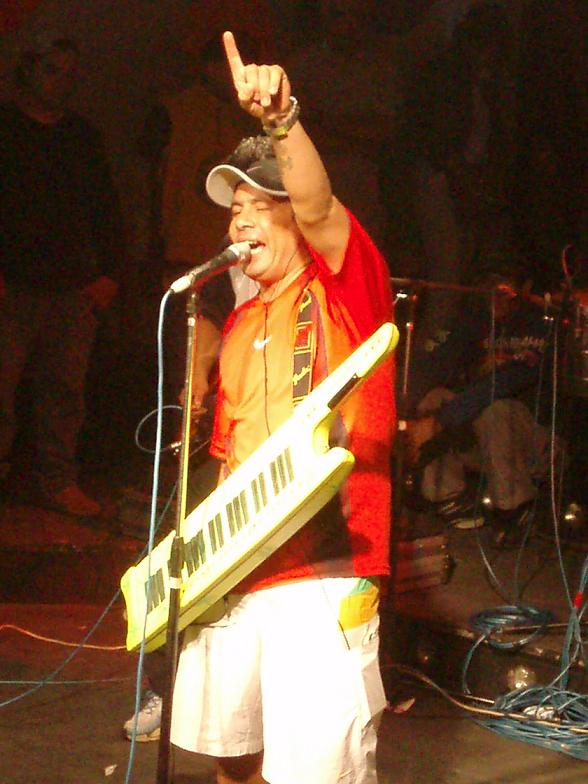
Pablo Lescano performing with his Damas Gratis in 2009

Ever since the 1930s, there has been a strong migration from the provinces (as well as from neighboring countries like Peru, Paraguay, and Bolivia) to the Greater Buenos Aires area, where factory jobs beckoned. Migrants brought along their culture; the musical mix and the dynamic sounds of big-city life eventually gave birth to new styles. Notably, chamamé from Corrientes was cross-pollinated with Andean music and cuarteto from Córdoba province. Peruvian cumbia bands, such as Los Mirlos, were much in demand in the Buenos Aires suburbs. During the 1970s and 1980s, tropical was used as a catch-all term for this hybrid.

In the 1990s, commercial interests started promoting local cumbia numbers such as Amar Azul and Ráfaga with a more sophisticated image and an emphasis on attracting wider audiences. Traditional cumbia lovers looked for "authentic" acts, and many bands obliged by settling on a square cumbia beat and writing lyrics that delved ever deeper into themes of crime and drug abuse. A pioneering act was Pibes Chorros. Other bands in this vein include Yerba Brava and Damas Gratis.

The pauperization of vast segments of the population due to the economic slowdown that started in 1998 enlarged the social substrate that sustained the genre. The term cumbia villera took hold in the media, and many bands were propelled into fame when emerging football stars from the shantytowns, such as Carlos Tevez, proclaimed their allegiance. When his schedule allows, Tevez is lead singer for Piola Vago.

Cumbia villera may be musically related to other local cumbia scenes, such as Mexican cumbia sonidera and chicha, from Peru.

== Parallels ==
Whilst traditional cumbia dancing bands often use a full brass section, cumbia villera recordings are often made at the lowest possible expense. As this usually entails the use of synthesizers, Argentine cumbia can be described, like Algerian raï, Romanian manele or Brazilian baile funk, as a "low-fidelity, high-tech" genre.
