= Damas Gratis =

Argentine cumbia band

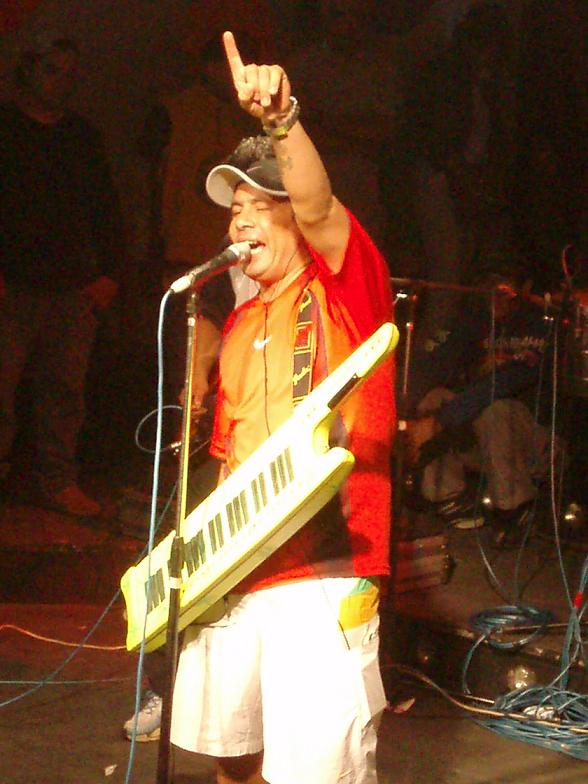
- Pablo Lescano performing live with Damas Gratis

Background information
- Origin: Argentina
- Genres: Cumbia villera
- Years active: 2000 - Present
- Members: Pablo Lescano; Romina Lescano "Yankee"; Carlos Segovia; Angel Navarro; Hugo Gomez; Edgar Gomes

Damas Gratis (Spanish for "Ladies' Night", literally "Ladies for Free") is an Argentine cumbia villera band started by Pablo Lescano in 2000.

In 2012, their album Esquivando el éxito won a Premios Gardel award for the best album by a "tropical" group.

== Discography ==
- Para los Pibes del Pabellón 2(2000)
- En Vivo - Hasta las Manos (2001)
- Operación Damas Gratis (2002)
- El Bonaerense (2003
- 100% Negro Cumbiero (2004)
- Damas gratis - En Vivo 2004 (2004)
- Sin Remedio (2005)
- Solo para Entendidos (2006)
- La Gota que Rebasó El Vaso (2008)
