= Emilia discography =

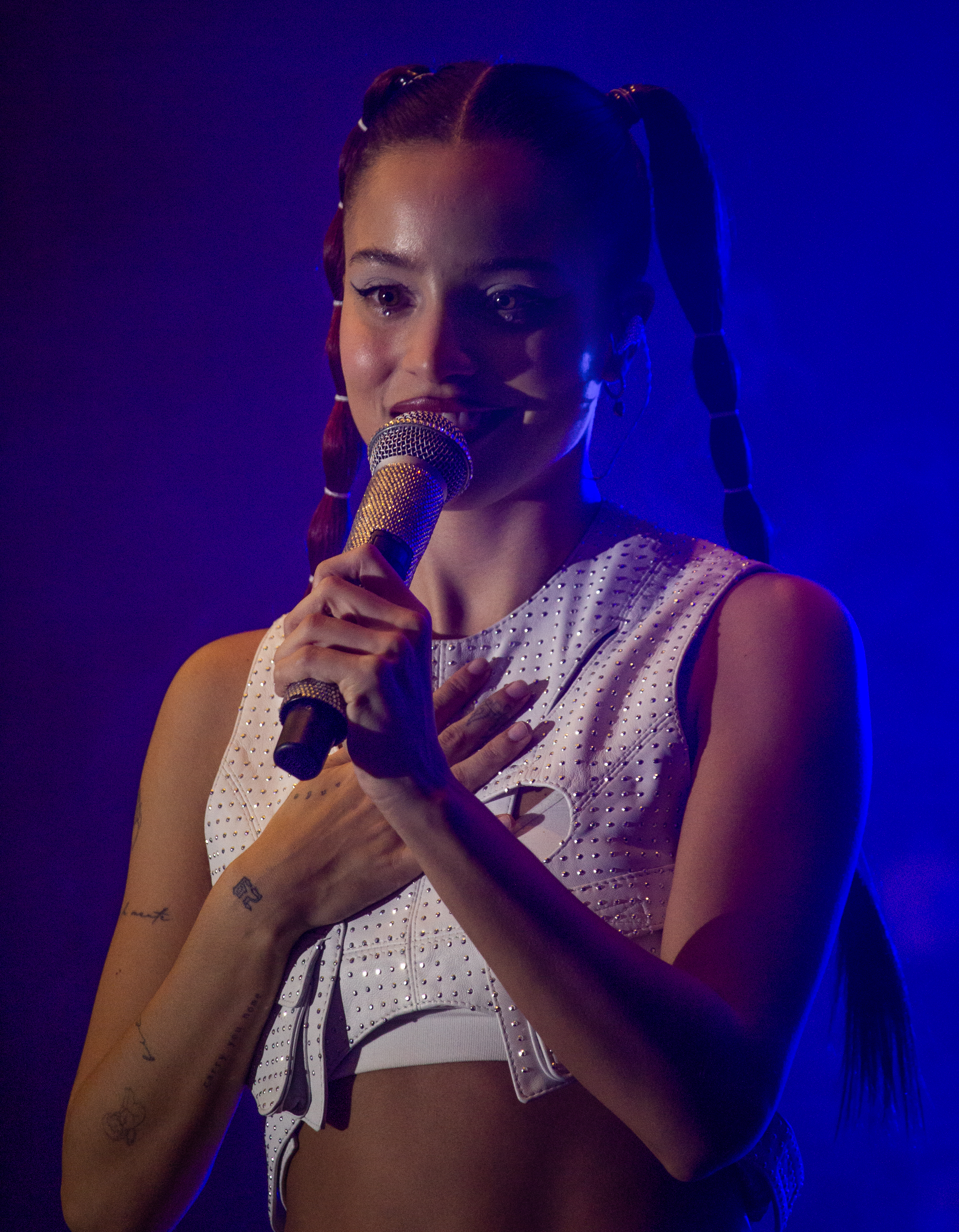
- Emilia in 2023
- Studio albums: 2
- EPs: 1
- Live albums: 1
- Singles: 47
- Promotional singles: 2

Argentine singer Emilia Mernes, known professionally as Emilia, has released two studio albums, one live album, one extended play (EP), 44 singles (including four as a featured artist), and one promotional single. Before launching her solo career, Emilia had been the lead singer of the Uruguayan cumbia pop band Rombai from 2016 to 2018. Her debut single, "Recalienta", was released in 2019.

After signing with Sony Music Latin, Emilia released her debut studio album Tú Crees en Mí?, which spawned four singles, "Como Si No Importara", "Rápido Lento", "Cuatro Veinte", and "Intoxicao", with all of them entering the top ten on the Billboard Argentina Hot 100. In 2023, she released her second studio album .MP3, supported by seven singles, including the number-one "La Original", a collaboration with Tini. She released her single "La Playlist", which follows the 2000s aesthetic of her previous project.

== Albums ==
=== Studio albums ===
List of studio albums with selected details
Title	Studio album details	Peaks		Certifications
Title	Studio album details	ARG	SPA	Certifications
Tú Crees en Mí?	Released: 31 May 2022; Label: Sony Latin; Formats: Digital download, streaming	—	49	CAPIF: Platinum
.MP3	Released: 3 November 2023; Label: Sony Latin, WK; Formats: CD, digital download, streaming	1	9	PROMUSICAE: Gold
"—" denotes a recording that did not chart or was not released in that territory.

=== Live albums ===
List of live albums with selected details
Title	Details
Emilia en Vivo	Released: 28 October 2022; Label: Sony Latin; Formats: Digital download, streaming
Tour en Vivo.mp3	Released: 23 July 2026; Label: Sony Latin; Formats: Digital download, streaming

== Extended plays ==
List of EPs, with selected details
Title	Details	Peaks
Title	Details	SPA
Perfectas	Released: 31 July 2025; Label: Sony Latin; Formats: Digital download, streaming	32

== Singles ==
=== As lead artist ===
List of singles as lead artist, showing selected chart positions, certifications, and associated albums
Title	Year	Peak chart positions										Certifications	Album
Title	Year	ARG	BOL	CHL	ECU	PAR	PER	SPA	URU	US Latin Pop	WW	Certifications	Album
"Recalienta"	2019	68	—	—	—	—	—	—	— (Note: "Recalienta" did not enter the Cámara Uruguaya de Productores de Fonogramas y Videogramas chart, but peaked at number 11 on the Monitor Latino Airplay chart.)	—	—		Non-album singles
"El Chisme" (with Ana Mena and Nio García)	2019	—	—	—	—	—	—	—	—	—	—		Non-album singles
"No Soy Yo" (with Darell)	2019	62	—	12	13	—	—	—	—	38	—		Non-album singles
"Billion"	2019	—	—	—	—	—	—	—	— (Note: "Billion" did not enter the Cámara Uruguaya de Productores de Fonogramas y Videogramas chart, but peaked at number 14 on the Monitor Latino Airplay chart.)	—	—		Non-album singles
"Policía"	2020	—	—	—	—	—	—	—	—	—	—		Non-album singles
"Histeriqueo" (with MYA)	2020	— (Note: "Histeriqueo" did not enter the Billboard Argentina Hot 100, but peaked at number 10 on the Monitor Latino National Airplay chart.)	—	—	—	100	—	—	—	—	—		Non-album singles
"Já é Tarde (No Más)" (with Bianca and Cabrera)	2020	—	—	—	—	—	—	—	—	—	—		Non-album singles
"Bendición" (with Alex Rose)	2020	54	1	2	1	10	—	—	— (Note: "Bendición" did not enter the Cámara Uruguaya de Productores de Fonogramas y Videogramas chart, but peaked at number 18 on the Monitor Latino Airplay chart.)	13	—		Non-album singles
"Esta Noche" (with FMK and Estani)	2020	67	—	—	—	—	—	—	—	—	—		Non-album singles
"Perreito Salvaje" (with Boza)	2021	43	—	—	—	—	—	—	—	—	—		Non-album singles
"Como Si No Importara" (with Duki)	2021	3	—	—	—	11	—	88	2	—	—	CAPIF: 4× Platinum; AMPROFON: Platinum+Gold; CUD: 3× Platinum; IFPI CHL: Gold; PROMUSICAE: Platinum; RIAA: Gold (Latin)	Tú Crees en Mí?
"Rápido Lento" (with Tiago PZK)	2021	2	—	—	—	70	—	—	5	—	—	CAPIF: 2× Platinum; CUD: 2× Platinum; RIAA: Gold (Latin)	Tú Crees en Mí?
"828" (with Aleesha)	2021	—	—	—	—	—	—	—	—	—	—		La Patrona
"BB" (with MYA)	2021	4	—	—	—	86	—	—	10	—	—		Suena MYA!
"De Enero a Diciembre" (with Rusherking)	2021	8	—	—	—	—	—	—	13	—	—	CAPIF: Platinum; CUD: Platinum	Non-album single
"Esto Recién Empieza" (with Duki)	2022	9	—	—	—	—	—	—	7	—	—	PROMUSICAE: Gold	Temporada de Reggaetón 2
"Cuatro Veinte"	2022	2	—	—	—	—	—	—	4	—	—	CAPIF: Platinum; CUD: Gold; PROMUSICAE: Gold; RIAA: Gold (Latin)	Tú Crees en Mí?
"Intoxicao" (with Nicki Nicole)	2022	8	—	—	—	—	—	—	—	—	—	CAPIF: Gold; AMPROFON: Gold; PROMUSICAE: Gold; RIAA: Gold (Latin)	Tú Crees en Mí?
"Q-Lito" (with Sael)	2022	—	—	—	—	—	—	—	—	—	—		El Pibe (Vol. 1)
"Quieres" (with Aitana and Ptazeta)	2022	75	—	—	—	—	—	20	— (Note: "Bendición" did not enter the Cámara Uruguaya de Productores de Fonogramas y Videogramas chart, but peaked at number 9 on the Monitor Latino Airplay chart.)	—	—	PROMUSICAE: 3× Platinum	Non-album singles
"La Chain"	2022	19	—	—	—	—	—	—	—	—	—		Non-album singles
"Underground"	2022	33	—	— (Note: "Underground" did not enter the Chile Songs chart, but peaked at number 3 on the Monitor Latino Chile General airplay chart.)	—	—	—	—	—	—	—		Non-album singles
"El Plan" (with Rusherking and L-Gante)	2022	52	—	—	—	—	—	—	—	—	—		Non-album singles
"En la Intimidad" (with Big One and Callejero Fino)	2023	1	8	—	—	7	—	—	1	—	171	PROMUSICAE: Gold	Non-album singles
"Uno los Dos" (with Miranda!)	2023	15	—	—	—	—	—	—	—	—	—		Hotel Miranda!
"Tu Recuerdo" (with Wisin and Lyanno)	2023	63 (Note: In 2026, Billboard mistakenly listed "Tu Recuerdo" as having reached the number 32 position on the Argentina Hot 100. However, that entry corresponded to Maluma's song of the same title, despite it being attributed to Emilia, Wisin, and Lyanno.)	—	— (Note: "Tu Recuerdo" did not enter the Chile Songs chart, but peaked at number 6 on the Monitor Latino Chile General airplay chart.)	—	75	—	—	—	—	—		Mr. W
"Jagger"	2023	5	—	—	—	—	—	—	13	—	—	PROMUSICAE: Gold	.MP3
"No Se Ve" (with Ludmilla)	2023	5	—	— (Note: "No Se Ve" did not enter the Chile Songs chart, but peaked at number 5 on the Monitor Latino Chile General airplay chart.)	— (Note: "No Se Ve" did not enter the Ecuador Songs chart, but peaked at number one on the Monitor Latino Ecuador General airplay chart.)	73	—	13	4	14	—	CAPIF: Gold; PMB: Gold; PROMUSICAE: 5× Platinum; RIAA: Gold (Latin)	.MP3
"Los del Espacio" (among Los del Espacio)	2023	1	5	2	22	2	6	3	1	—	38	CAPIF: 2× Platinum; PROMUSICAE: 6× Platinum	Non-album singles
"Nagasaki" (with Polimá Westcoast)	2023	—	—	—	—	—	—	—	—	—	—		Non-album singles
"Guerrero"	2023	88	—	—	—	—	—	—	—	—	—		.MP3
"Salgo a Bailar" (with FMK)	2023	14	—	—	—	52	—	—	12	—	—		Non-album single
"GTA"	2023	2	—	—	—	—	—	62	4	—	—	PROMUSICAE: Gold; RIAA: Gold (Latin)	.MP3
"La Original" (with Tini)	2023	1	— (Note: "La Original" did not enter the Billboard Bolivia Songs chart, but peaked at number 13 on the Monitor Latino Bolivia Top 20 Airplay chart.)	— (Note: "La Original" did not enter the Billboard Chile Songs chart, but peaked at number one on the Monitor Latino Chile Top 20 Airplay chart.)	— (Note: "La Original" did not enter the Billboard Ecuador Songs chart, but peaked at number five on the Monitor Latino Ecuador Top 20 Airplay chart.)	4	— (Note: "La Original" did not enter the Billboard Peru Songs chart, but peaked at number five on the Monitor Latino Peru Top 20 Airplay chart.)	8	2	3	170	AMPROFON: Gold; PROMUSICAE: 4× Platinum; RIAA: Platinum (Latin)	.MP3
"Exclusive"	2023	3	—	—	—	—	—	—	4	—	—	PROMUSICAE: Gold	.MP3
"Jet Set" (with Nathy Peluso)	2024	30	—	—	—	—	—	58	—	—	—		.MP3
"Tú y Yo" (with Khea)	2024	26	—	—	—	—	—	—	— (Note: "Tú y Yo" did not enter the Cámara Uruguaya de Productores de Fonogramas y Videogramas chart, but peaked at number 16 on the Monitor Latino Airplay chart.)	—	—		Non-album singles
"Perdonarte, ¿Para Qué?" (with Los Ángeles Azules)	2024	1	3	24	—	9	20	85	1	—	—	PROMUSICAE: Gold	Non-album singles
"La Playlist"	2024	10	—	— (Note: "La Playlist" did not enter the Billboard Chile Songs chart, but peaked at number five on the Monitor Latino Chile Top 20 Airplay chart.)	— (Note: "La Playlist" did not enter the Billboard Ecuador Songs chart, but peaked at number one on the Monitor Latino Ecuador Top 20 Airplay chart.)	—	— (Note: "La Playlist" did not enter the Billboard Peru Songs chart, but peaked at number 18 on the Monitor Latino Peru Top 20 Airplay chart.)	39	8	6	—	PROMUSICAE: Gold	Non-album singles
"Alegría" (with Tiago PZK and Anitta)	2024	3	—	—	—	36	—	42	2	—	—	PROMUSICAE: Gold; RIAA: Gold (Latin)	Gotti A
"Carita Triste" (with Ana Mena)	2024	18	— (Note: "Carita Triste" did not enter the Billboard Bolivia Songs chart, but peaked at number 13 on the Monitor Latino Bolivia Top 20 Airplay chart.)	—	— (Note: "Carita Triste" did not enter the Billboard Ecuador Songs chart, but peaked at number five on the Monitor Latino Ecuador Top 20 Pop Airplay chart.)	— (Note: "Carita Triste" did not enter the SGP airplay chart, but peaked at number nine on the Monitor Latino Paraguay Top 20 Pop Airplay chart.)	—	6	—	—	—	CAPIF: Gold; PROMUSICAE: Platinum	Non-album singles
"Novio Gangsta"	2024	3	—	—	—	— (Note: "Novio Gangsta" did not enter the SGP Paraguay Airplay chart, but peaked at number 13 on the Monitor Latino Paraguay Top 20 Pop airplay chart.)	— (Note: "Novio Gangsta" did not enter the Billboard Peru Songs chart, but peaked at number four on the Monitor Latino Peru Top 20 Pop airplay chart.)	92	6	—	—		Non-album singles
"Vestido Rojo" (with Silvestre Dangond)	2025	68	—	— (Note: "Vestido Rojo" did not enter the Billboard Chile Songs chart, but peaked at number two on the Monitor Latino Chile Top 20 Airplay chart.)	— (Note: "Vestido Rojo" did not enter the Billboard Ecuador Songs chart, but peaked at number one on the Monitor Latino Ecuador Top 20 airplay chart.)	93	— (Note: "Vestido Rojo" did not enter the Billboard Peru Songs chart, but peaked at number 15 on the Monitor Latino Peru Top 20 Airplay chart.)	—	— (Note: "Vestido Rojo" did not enter the Uruguayan Singles chart, but peaked at number six on the Uruguayan Airplay chart.)	—	—		Non-album singles
"Bunda" (with Luisa Sonza)	2025	3	—	—	—	65	—	83	1	—	—		Perfectas
"Blackout" (with Tini and Nicki Nicole)	2025	1	— (Note: "Blackout" did not enter the Billboard Bolivia Songs chart, but peaked at number six on the Monitor Latino Bolivia Top 20 Airplay chart.)	— (Note: "Blackout" did not enter the Billboard Chile Songs chart, but peaked at number 17 on the Monitor Latino Chile Top 20 Airplay chart.)	— (Note: "Blackout" did not enter the Billboard Ecuador Songs chart, but peaked at number nine on the Monitor Latino Ecuador Top 20 Pop Airplay chart.)	—	— (Note: "Blackout" did not enter the Billboard Peru Songs chart, but peaked at number 16 on the Monitor Latino Peru Top 20 Airplay chart.)	8	— (Note: "Blackout" did not enter the Uruguayan Singles chart, but peaked at number five on the Uruguayan Airplay chart.)	—	— (Note: "Blackout" did not enter the Billboard Global 200 chart, but peaked at number 119 on the Billboard Global Excl. US chart.)	PROMUSICAE: Platinum; RIAA: Gold (Latin)	Perfectas
"Motinha 2.0 (Mete Marcha)" (with Dennis and Luisa Sonza)	2025	4	—	—	—	—	—	—	—	—	—		Non-album singles
"Masna (Remix)" (with FMK, Tiago PZK and Nicki Nicole)	2025	9	—	—	—	—	—	—	—	—	—		Non-album singles
"Más Te Vale" (with Yami Safdie)	2025	12	—	—	—	—	—	—	—	—	—		Non-album singles
"Pasarella" (with Six Sex)	2025	22	—	—	—	47	—	—	—	—	—		Perfectas
"Perfectas"	2025	78	—	—	—	—	—	—	—	—	—		Perfectas
"Genio Atrapado"	2025	— (Note: "Genio Atrapado" did not enter the Billboard Argentina Hot 100 chart, but peaked at number 17 on the Monitor Latino Argentina National Songs airplay chart.)	—	—	—	—	—	—	—	—	—		Non-album singles
"Jetski" (remix) (with Pedro Sampaio, Melody and MC Meno K)	2026	10	—	—	—	99	—	—	— (Note: "Jetski" did not enter the Uruguayan Singles chart, but peaked at number 11 on the Uruguayan Airplay chart.)	—	—		Non-album singles
"Bodypainting"	2026	—	—	—	—	—	—	—	—	—	—		TBA
"—" denotes a recording that did not chart or was not released in that territory.

=== As featured artist ===
List of singles as featured artist, showing year released and chart positions
Title	Year	Peak chart positions										Certifications	Album
Title	Year	ARG	BOL	CHL	ECU	NIC	PAR	PER	SPA	URU	WW	Certifications	Album
"Boomshakalaka" (Dimitri Vegas & Like Mike, Afro Bros and Sebastián Yatra featuring Camilo and Emilia)	2019	—	—	—	32	14	—	—	—	— (Note: "Boomshakalaka" did not enter the Cámara Uruguaya de Productores de Fonogramas y Videogramas chart, but peaked at number 17 on the Monitor Latino Uruguay Airplay chart.)	—	PROMUSICAE: Gold	Non-album single
"Tu Debilidad" (Mati Gómez featuring Emilia)	2021	—	1	1	—	—	—	—	—	—	—		Surreal
"Diva" (Princess Nokia featuring Emilia)	2022	—	—	—	—	—	—	—	—	—	—		Non-album single
"Una Foto (Remix)" (Mesita, Tiago PZK and Nicki Nicole featuring Emilia)	2024	1	1	7	21	—	10	2	6	1	46	PROMUSICAE: 2× Platinum	Non-album single
"Olvidarte" (Gordo featuring Emilia)	2024	4	—	—	—	—	32	—	—	2	—		No Hay Verano Sin Gordo
"—" denotes a recording that did not chart or was not released in that territory.

=== Promotional singles ===
List of promotional singles
Title	Year	Album
"No Más"	2020	Non-album promotional single
"Al Final" (Versión de Créditos) (featuring Te Vaka)	2024	Moana 2 (Banda Sonora Original)
"Beautiful"	2025	Perfectas
"Servidora"	2025	Perfectas
"Maldita Noche" (Live)	2025	Tour en Vivo.mp3

== Other charted songs ==
List of other charted songs showing chart positions and albums
Title	Year	Peaks		Album
Title	Year	ARG	SWE	Album
"Facts"	2023	71	—	.MP3
"Iconic"	2023	41	—	.MP3
"Girl's Girl" (with Zara Larsson)	2026	—	— (Note: "Girl's Girl" did not enter the Swedish Singellista Chart, but peaked at number four on the Swedish Heatseeker Chart.)	Midnight Sun: Girls Trip
"—" denotes a recording that did not chart

== Guest appearances ==
List of guest appearances showing year released and album name
Title	Year	Other artist(s)	Album
"Te Doy Mi Vida"	2021	Carlos Vives, Lucas Arnau, Alex Rose, Cheo Gallego	Masters en Parranda (Colombian Pop Collection)
"Pal Perreo"	2022	FMK, Guaynaa	Desde el Espacio
"Ultravioleta"	2023	Lola Índigo	El Dragón
"Damn Girl"	2024	Lit Killah	Kustom
"Girl's Girl"	2026	Zara Larsson	Midnight Sun: Girls Trip
