= List of number-one Billboard Regional Mexican Songs of 2024 =

The Billboard Regional Mexican Songs is a subchart of the Latin Airplay chart that ranks the best-performing songs on Regional Mexican radio stations in the United States. Published weekly by Billboard magazine, it ranks the "most popular regional Mexican songs, ranked by radio airplay audience impressions as measured by Nielsen Music".

== Chart history ==
| Issue date | Song | Artist(s) | Ref. |
|---|---|---|---|
| January 6 | "Vas a Querer Volver" | Banda Los Recoditos | |
| January 13 | "Buscandole a la Suerte" | Julión Álvarez | |
| January 20 | "Neta Que No" | La Fiera de Ojinaga | |
| January 27 | "Como en los Viejos Tiempos" | Edén Muñoz | |
| February 3 | "Harley Quinn" | Fuerza Regida and Marshmello | |
| February 10 | "La Diabla" | Xavi | |
| February 17 | "Ahi No Era" | Gerardo Ortíz | |
| February 24 | "Gracias a Ti" | Los Dos Carnales | |
| March 2 | "Alch Si" | Carín León and Grupo Frontera | |
| March 9 | "Por el Contrario" | Becky G with Leonardo Aguilar and Ángela Aguilar | |
| March 16 | "El Exitoso" | El Fantasma | |
| March 23 | "Ojala Estuvieras Aqui" | Intocable | |
| March 30 | "La Intencion" | Christian Nodal and Peso Pluma | |
| April 6 | "La Intencion" | Christian Nodal and Peso Pluma | |
| April 13 | "La Cumbia Triste" | Los Angeles Azules y Alejandro Fernández | |
| April 20 | "Tu Perfume" | Banda MS | |
| April 27 | "First Love" | Óscar Ortíz and Edgardo Nuñez | |
| May 4 | "Dias Buenos, Dias Malos" | Calibre 50 | |
| May 11 | "Ya Pedo Quien Sabe" | Grupo Frontera and Christian Nodal | |
| May 18 | "(Entre Paréntesis)" | Shakira and Grupo Frontera | |
| May 25 | "Corazón de Piedra" | Xavi | |
| June 1 | "Corazón de Piedra" | Xavi | |
| June 8 | "Cobijas Ajenas" | Alejandro Fernández and Alfredo Olivas | |
| June 15 | "Bandida" | La Adictiva, Grupo Marca Registrada and Montana | |
| June 22 | "Sabor a Michelada" | El Fantasma | |
| June 29 | "El Humo de Mi Gallo" | Banda Los Sebastianes and Edgardo Nuñez | |
| July 6 | "Bandido de Amores" | Leonardo Aguilar and Pepe Aguilar | |
| July 13 | "El Beneficio de La Duda" | Grupo Firme | |
| July 20 | "Perdonarte, ¿Para Qué?" | Los Ángeles Azules and Emilia | |
| July 27 | "El Beneficio de la Duda" | Grupo Firme | |
| August 3 | "Mercedes" | Becky G and Oscar Maydon | |
| August 10 | "Por Que Sera?" | Grupo Frontera and Maluma | |
| August 17 | "Aqui Mando Yo" | Los Tigres del Norte | |
| August 24 | "Tutorial Para Olvidar" | Gerardo Coronel El Jerry | |
| August 31 | "#OOTD" | Xavi | |
| September 7 | "Aquí Hay Para Llevar" | La Arrolladora Banda El Limón de René Camacho | |
| September 14 | "Mira Quién Lo Dice" | Pepe Aguilar | |
| September 21 | "La Tóxica" | Alejandro Fernández and Anitta | |
| September 28 | "El Primer Tonto" | Los Angeles de Charly | |
| October 5 | "Tengo Claro" | Banda MS featuring Alfredo Olivas | |
| October 12 | "Mi Eterno Amor Secreto" | Yuridia and Edén Muñoz | |
| October 19 | "Mi Castigo" | Intocable | |
| October 26 | "El Mejor de Mis Días" | La Fiera de Ojinaga and Tapy Quintero | |
| November 2 | "El Amor de Mi Vida" | Calibre 50 | |
| November 9 | "Con Todo Respetillo" | Joss Favela and Luis R Conriquez | |
| November 16 | "Traigo Saldo y Ganas de Rogar" | Edén Muñoz | |
| November 23 | "Traigo Saldo y Ganas de Rogar" | Edén Muñoz | |
| November 30 | "Si Ya Me Voy" | Jessi Uribe | |
| December 7 | "Amor Bonito" | Luis Angel "El Flaco" | |
| December 14 | "Hecha Pa' Mi" | Grupo Frontera | |
| December 21 | "Flores" | Xavi | |
| December 28 | "Amor Bonito" | Luis Angel "El Flaco" | |
