= Guerrero (song) =

Single by Emilia

from the album .MP3
- English title: "Warrior"
- Released: June 15, 2023
- Genre: Pop
- Length: 3:58
- Label: Sony Latin
- Songwriters: Francisco Zecca; María Emilia Mernes; Mauro Ezequiel Lombardo
- Producer: Zecca

Emilia singles chronology
"Nagasaki" (2023)	"Guerrero" (2023)	"Salgo a Bailar" (2023)

Music video
- "Guerrero" on YouTube

"Guerrero" (stylized as "Guerrero.mp3") is a song by Argentine singer Emilia. She wrote it along with Mauro Ezequiel Lombardo and its producer Francisco Zecca. The song was released through Sony Music Latin on June 15, 2023, as the third single from Emilia's second studio album .MP3.

== Background ==
Mernes kicked off the year by releasing previews of what will be her second studio album. On March 30 she released the dance pop song "Jagger", and on May 3 she released "No Se Ve", an electronic-urban and funk carioca collaboration with Brazilian singer Ludmilla. Both songs managed to reach the top 10 of the Billboard Argentina Hot 100, at number 5 and 8 respectively. She also released the number-one songs "En la Intimidad" (with Big One and Callejero Fino) and "Los del Espacio" (along with Lit Killah with Tiago PZK, María Becerra, Duki, Rusherking, Big One and FMK).

In mid-June, Emilia shared a short video on her Instagram account talking about her parents, hinting that it could be part of a new song: "To my mom, the word I use to define her is resilient, and to my dad, a warrior." she said before showing family photos. On June 14, Emilia posted a brief snippet of the music video for "Guerrero" in her social networks, finally announcing the song.

== Composition ==
The song is a tribute to her father, Pedro Mernes, who suffered from cancer years before the song was released. Emilia said that it was the "most vulnerable" song she has written in her life: "I had to go to the darkest places in my life to be able to tell everything".

"Thanks to my dad for inspiring me every day, for being the strongest person I know, my warrior... I admire you for fighting like no one else in this life and winning your battle. I hope you like this song that goes from the depths of me soul, that it accompany and heal a little the hearts of all the people who are going through a war".

== Charts ==
Chart performance for "Guerrero"
Chart (2023)	Peak position
Argentina Hot 100 (Billboard)	88
