= Alegría (Tiago PZK, Anitta and Emilia song) =

2024 single by Tiago PZK, Anitta, and Emilia

Single by Tiago PZK, Anitta and Emilia

from the album Gotti A
- Language: Portuguese; Spanish; English
- Released: 8 August 2024
- Genre: Brazilian funk
- Length: 2:45
- Label: Warner Latina
- Songwriters: Larissa de Macedo Machado; María Emilia Mernes; Tiago Uriel Pacheco Lezcano
- Producers: Tatool; Zecca

Tiago PZK singles chronology
"De Vuelta" (2024)	"Alegría" (2024)	"Tu Fiesta de Cumpleaños" (2024)

Anitta singles chronology
"Mi Amor" (2024)	"Alegría" (2024)	"Saudade" (2024)

Emilia singles chronology
"La Playlist" (2024)	"Alegría" (2024)	"Carita Triste" (2024)

Music video
- "Alegría" on YouTube

"Alegría" is a song by Argentine singer Tiago PZK, Brazilian singer Anitta, and Argentine singer Emilia. It was released on August 8, 2024, through Warner Music Latina as the fourth single from Tiago's second studio album, Gotti A (2024). The song was written by the three performers and produced by Tatool and Zecca.

== Background and release ==
"Alegría" was one of the first songs Tiago worked on for Gotti A. He used Google Translate to write the chorus, which includes lyrics in Portuguese. After recording a demo of the song, he named the file "Anitta", hoping that she could collaborate with him on the track. He also wanted to work with Emilia, who had previously experimented with Brazilian funk in her 2023 song "No Se Ve" in collaboration with Brazilian singer Ludmilla. After showing the demo to Emilia and sending it to Anitta, both artists decided to join the project. The song was written by the three performers and produced by Tatool and Zecca.

On June 24, 2024, Tiago announced Gotti A along with the tracklist, which included "Alegría" as the fifth track. The album was released on July 4 for digital download and streaming; however, the song was not available at that time, as Tiago planned to release it later. Additionally, the music video had been filmed two days before the album's release. On August 6, Tiago announced the release of "Alegría" on his social media. The song was released on August 8 for digital download and streaming as the fourth single from the album.

== Music video ==
The music video for "Alegría" was released simultaneously with the song. It was directed by María Sosa Betancor and filmed in Madrid two days before the album's release.

== Credits and personnel ==
Credits adapted from Tidal.

- Tiago PZK – vocals, songwriting
- Anitta – vocals, songwriting
- Emilia – vocals, songwriting
- Tatool – production, recording engineering
- Zecca – production, recording engineering, mixing engineering
- Dave Kutch – mastering engineering

== Charts ==
Chart performance for "Alegría"
Chart (2024)	Peak position
Argentina Hot 100 (Billboard)	3
Argentina Airplay (Monitor Latino)	6
Argentina (CAPIF)	2
Uruguay (CUD)	2
Uruguay Airplay (Monitor Latino)	9

== Certifications ==
Certifications for "Alegría"
Region	Certification	Certified units/sales
Spain (Promusicae)	Gold	30,000^{‡}
United States (RIAA)	Gold (Latin)	30,000^{‡}
^{‡} Sales+streaming figures based on certification alone.
