= Movistar Arena (Buenos Aires) =

Indoor arena in Buenos Aires

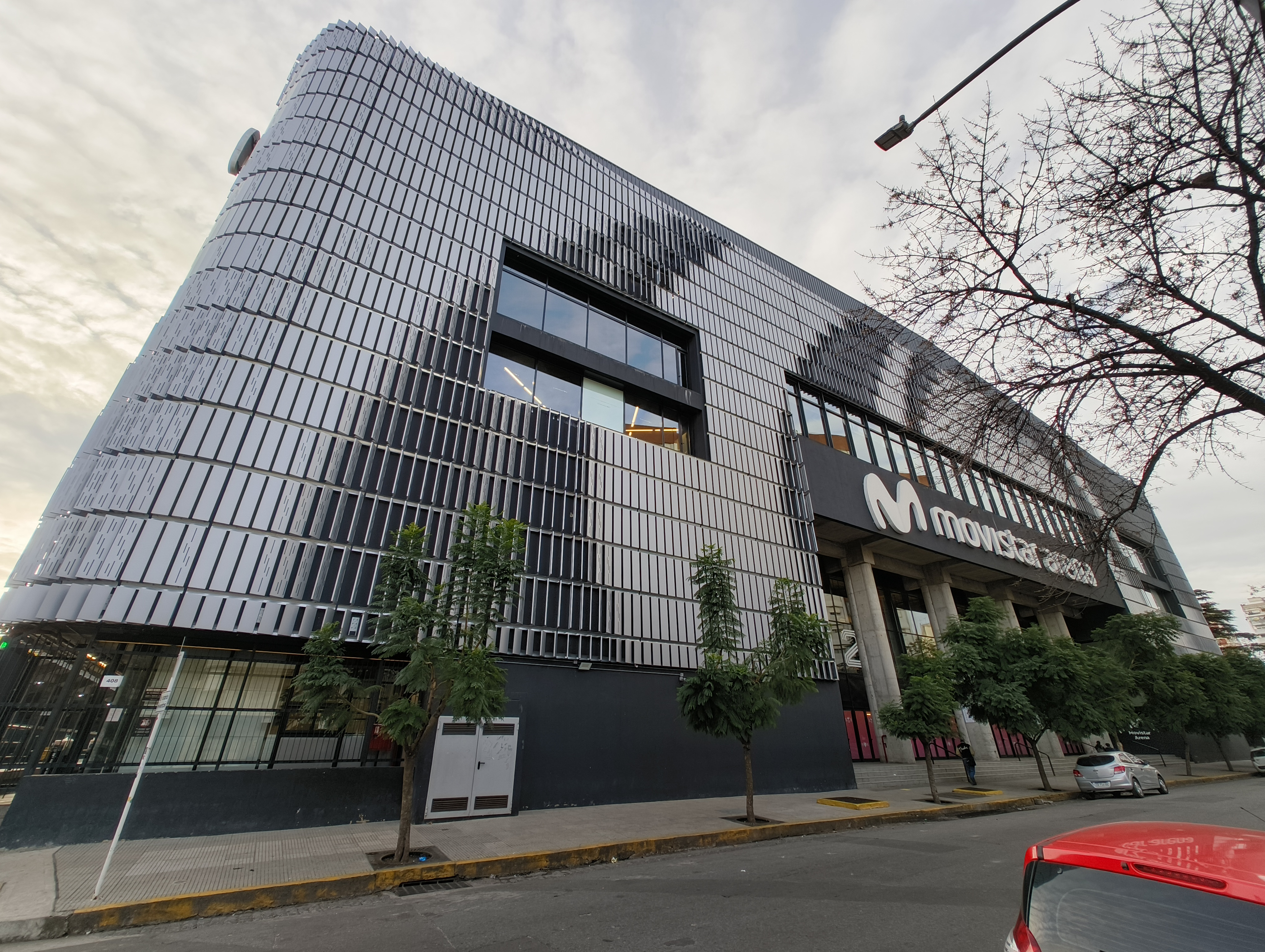
- Exterior view in June 2025
- Interactive map of Movistar Arena
- Location: Humboldt 450, Villa Crespo; Buenos Aires, Argentina
- Coordinates: 34°35′39″S 58°26′53″W
- Owner: Movistar Argentina
- Operator: ASM Global
- Capacity: 15,000

Construction
- Groundbreaking: 2014
- Opened: November 1, 2019
- Cost: US$38,000,000

Website
- movistararena.com.ar

Movistar Arena is a multiuse indoor arena with a seating capacity of 15,000. It is located in the Villa Crespo neighborhood of Buenos Aires, Argentina. The arena opened in 2019 as the primary replacement to the now closed DirecTV Arena and is located on the premises of the Atlético Atlanta club. Telefónica's cell phone division, Movistar, acquired the arena's naming rights until 2057. Managed by the multinational company ASM Global, the arena is the most significant concert venue in Argentina and the second largest indoor arena in the country.

== History ==
The land which the arena occupies was originally owned by Club Atlético Atlanta until 1991 when the club was forced to sell the property due to bankruptcy. It was later acquired by a private company and remained closed for over fifteen years, leading to a state of abandonment. In 2005, the property was expropriated by the Government of the City of Buenos Aires and re-concessioned to the football club.

Construction of the stadium commenced in 2014 under the management of the company Lugones Center. However, due to insufficient funds, the project was suspended in 2015, leaving the half-finished concrete structure abandoned. In late 2017, the project was resumed by Buenos Aires Arena S.A., a specialized corporate venture in order to finish the project. The international firm ASM Global was contracted as its operator due to their experience and expertise in event service delivery.

The arena had its grand opening on 1 November 2019 with a concert by Tini as part of her Quiero Volver Tour. The event featured special guest performances by Karina and Luis Fonsi. The concert was broadcast live on Movistar Play, the social networks of Movistar Argentina, and TNcom.

== Transport ==
Movistar Arena is conveniently located one block away from Avenida Corrientes, Avenida Dorrego and Avenida Juan B. Justo. Public transportation options include access via the Urquiza Line at Federico Lacroze station, as well as the Line B subway at Dorrego station. Additionally, 21 bus lines and the EcoBici bike-sharing system provide connectivity between the city and the arena.

== Events ==
List of entertainment events held at Movistar Arena
| Date | Performer | Event |
2019
| 1 November (Note: Inaugural event at the venue.) | Tini | Quiero Volver Tour |
| 2 November | Joan Manuel Serrat; Joaquín Sabina | Serrat y Sabina - No Hay Dos Sin Tres |
| 3 November | Joan Manuel Serrat; Joaquín Sabina | Serrat y Sabina - No Hay Dos Sin Tres |
| 7 November | Joan Manuel Serrat; Joaquín Sabina | Serrat y Sabina - No Hay Dos Sin Tres |
| 8 November | Joan Manuel Serrat; Joaquín Sabina | Serrat y Sabina - No Hay Dos Sin Tres |
| 9 November | Chayanne | Desde el Alma Tour |
| 10 November | Chayanne | Desde el Alma Tour |
| 21 November | Abel Pintos | Universo Paralelo |
| 22 November | Abel Pintos | Universo Paralelo |
| 23 November | Abel Pintos | Universo Paralelo |
| 29 November | Keane | Cause and Effect Tour |
| 5 December | Andrés Calamaro | — |
| 6 December | Shawn Mendes | Shawn Mendes: The Tour |
| 7 December | Shawn Mendes | Shawn Mendes: The Tour |
| 13 December | Dream Theater | Distance over Time Tour |
| 14 December | J Balvin | Arcoíris Tour |
| 16 December | Norah Jones | — |
| 21 December | La Beriso | Giras y Madrugadas |
| 28 December | Freestyle Master Series Argentina 2019 - Jornada Final | |
2020
| 27 February | Ricky Martin | Movimiento Tour |
| 28 February | Ricky Martin | Movimiento Tour |
| 29 February | Ricky Martin | Movimiento Tour |
| 4 September (Note: Event held at the venue via streaming during mandatory isolation in Argentina due to COVID-19.) | Miranda! | — |
| 5 September | Destino San Javier | — |
| 11 September | El Kuelgue | — |
| 19 September | MYA; Ruggero | — |
| 25 September | La Passworld | Digital Fest |
| 26 September | David Lebón | — |
| 27 September | Axel | Show solidario |
| 3 October | Vicentico | — |
| 9 October | Dante Spinetta | Niguri Sessions |
| 12 October | Soledad Pastorutti | Parte de Mí |
| 16 October | Daniel El Travieso | Especial de Halloween |
| 25 October | Juanse | La Noche del líder, Juanse & Amigos |
| 29 October | Bandalos Chinos | Paranoia Pop: El Musical |
| 1 November | Fito Páez | La Conquista del Espacio |
| 5 November | Bandalos Chinos | Paranoia Pop: El Musical |
| 8 November | Fito Páez | La Conquista del Espacio |
| 20 November | Las Pastillas del Abuelo | ’2020’ album presentation |
| 26 November | Buenos Aires Trap | |
| 28 November | Las Pastillas del Abuelo | Lanzamiento de disco "2020" |
| 3 December | Buenos Aires Trap | |
| 13 December | Marcela Morelo | Tu Mejor Plan |
2021
| 28 August (Note: Originally scheduled to take place on 8 May 2021 but was postponed due to mandatory isolation in Argentina due to COVID-19.) | Axel | — |
| 18 September | La Voz Argentina 2021 - El Show en Vivo | |
| 25 September | L-Gante | — |
| 8 October | Soledad Pastorutti | Parte de Mí |
| 9 October | Soledad Pastorutti | Parte de Mí |
| 10 October | Soledad Pastorutti | Parte de Mí |
| 14 October | Abel Pintos | El Amor en Mi Vida |
| 15 October | Abel Pintos | El Amor en Mi Vida |
| 16 October | Abel Pintos | El Amor en Mi Vida |
| 17 October | Abel Pintos | El Amor en Mi Vida |
| 20 October | Abel Pintos | El Amor en Mi Vida |
| 21 October | Abel Pintos | El Amor en Mi Vida |
| 22 October | Los Tekis | Carnaval: El Regreso |
| 23 October | Abel Pintos | El Amor en Mi Vida |
| 24 October | Abel Pintos | El Amor en Mi Vida |
| 28 October | Abel Pintos | El Amor en Mi Vida |
| 29 October | Abel Pintos | El Amor en Mi Vida |
| 30 October | Abel Pintos | El Amor en Mi Vida |
| 31 October | Abel Pintos | El Amor en Mi Vida |
| 6 November | El Principito Sinfónico | |
| 20 November | Skay y Los Fakires | — |
| 27 November | El Kuelgue | — |
| 4 December | Babasónicos | — |
| 11 December | Las Pastillas del Abuelo | — |
| 12 December | Duki | Movistar Fri Music |
| 15 December | Fito Páez | — |
| 17 December | Camilo | Mis Manos Tour |
| 18 December | Ciro y los Persas | — |
2022
| 25 August (Note: Originally scheduled to take place on 5 September 2020 but was postponed due to mandatory isolation in Argentina due to COVID-19.) | A-ha | Play Hunting High And Low Tour |
| 26 March | Rels B | Flakk's Tour |
| 27 March | Rels B | Flakk's Tour |
| 14 April (Note: Originally scheduled to take place on 12 March 2022.) | José Luis Perales | Baladas para una Despedida |
| 16 April | FMK | Desde el Espacio |
| 17 April | God Level – All Stars 2 vs 2 | |
| 7 May (Note: Originally scheduled to take place on 23 May 2020 but was postponed due to mandatory isolation in Argentina due to COVID-19.) | Cristian Castro | The Hits Tour |
| 17 May | Soda Stereo | Gracias Totales |
| 19 May | Anuel AA | Las Leyendas Nunca Mueren Tour |
| 21 May (Note: Originally scheduled to take place on 15 May 2020 but was postponed due to mandatory isolation in Argentina due to COVID-19.) | Louis Tomlinson | Louis Tomlinson World Tour |
| 22 May | Louis Tomlinson | Louis Tomlinson World Tour |
| 25 May | Mau & Ricky | Movistar Fri Music |
| 27 May | Karol G | Bichota Tour |
| 28 May | Karol G | Bichota Tour |
| 12 June | Wisin & Yandel | La Última Misión World Tour |
| 14 June | Wisin & Yandel | La Última Misión World Tour |
| 24 June | Babasónicos | Bye Bye Tour |
| 25 June | Babasónicos | Bye Bye Tour |
| 28 June | Esteban Bullrich; Carlos Páez Rodríguez; Diego Torres | La Vida Es Hoy |
| 8 July | Los Palmeras | La Ruta del Oro |
| 9 July | Los Palmeras | La Ruta del Oro |
| 21 July | Nick Jr. Live | |
| 23 July | Erasure | The Neon Tour |
| 23 July | Miraculous Ladybug: The Musical Show | |
| 30 July | Tiago PZK | Postales Tour |
| 31 July | Tiago PZK | Postales Tour |
| 5 August | Ricardo Arjona | Blanco y Negro Tour |
| 6 August | Ricardo Arjona | Blanco y Negro Tour |
| 7 August | Ricardo Arjona | Blanco y Negro Tour |
| 10 August | Ricardo Arjona | Blanco y Negro Tour |
| 12 August | Sebastián Yatra | Dharma Tour |
| 13 August | Sebastián Yatra | Dharma Tour |
| 18 August | Ricardo Arjona | Blanco y Negro Tour |
| 19 August | Ricardo Arjona | Blanco y Negro Tour |
| 20 August | Ricardo Arjona | Blanco y Negro Tour |
| 23 August | Premios Carlos Gardel 2022 | |
| 25 August | Rosalía | Motomami World Tour |
| 26 August | Rosalía | Motomami World Tour |
| 27 August | Lali | Disciplina Tour |
| 28 August | Marc Anthony | Pa'lla Voy Tour |
| 29 August | Marc Anthony | Pa'lla Voy Tour |
| 7 September | Dream Theater | Top of the World Tour |
| 9 September | Demi Lovato | Holy Fvck Tour |
| 10 September | La Voz Argentina 2022 - El Show en Vivo | |
| 16 September | Kjarkas; Chila Jatun | La Historia Continúa |
| 20 September | Fito Páez | Tour El amor 30 Años después del amor |
| 21 September | Fito Páez | Tour El amor 30 Años después del amor |
| 23 September | Emilia | ¿Tú crees en mí?: Tour |
| 24 September | Emilia | ¿Tú crees en mí?: Tour |
| 25 September | Fito Páez | Tour El amor 30 años después del amor |
| 26 September | Fito Páez | Tour El amor 30 años después del amor |
| 28 September | Ana Gabriel | Por amor a ustedes World Tour |
| 29 September | Fito Páez | Tour El amor 30 años después del amor |
| 30 September | Fito Páez | Tour El amor 30 años después del amor |
| 2 October (Note: Originally scheduled to take place on 18 July 2020 but was postponed due to mandatory isolation in Argentina due to COVID-19.) | Los Polinesios | Jump World Tour |
| 6 October | Drácula, el musical - La Despedida | |
| 7 October | Drácula, el musical - La Despedida | |
| 8 October | Drácula, el musical - La Despedida | |
| 12 October | David Garrett | Alive Tour 2022 |
| 13 October (Note: Originally scheduled to take place on 20 June 2020 but was postponed due to mandatory isolation in Argentina due to COVID-19.) | Morat | Morat World Tour |
| 15 October | J Balvin | José Tour |
| 17 October | André Rieu | King of Waltz 2022 |
| 18 October | André Rieu | King of Waltz 2022 |
| 19 October | André Rieu | King of Waltz 2022 |
| 21 October | Karina "La Princesita" | — |
| 23 October | Acru | Red Bull Batalla - Final Nacional Argentina |
| 26 October | Babasónicos | Bye Bye Tour |
| 27 October | Cultura Profética | 25 Años - Sobrevolando Tour |
| 28 October | Babasónicos | Bye Bye Tour |
| 29 October | Soledad Pastorutti | — |
| 30 October | Nicki Nicole | Movistar Fri Music |
| 1 November | TEDx Río de la Plata 2022 | |
| 3 November | El Cuarteto de Nos | Tour 2022 |
| 4 November | Mon Laferte | Mon Laferte: Gira Mundial 2022 |
| 5 November | Conociendo Rusia | — |
| 7 November | Fito Páez | Tour El amor 30 años después del amor |
| 8 November | Fito Páez | Tour El amor 30 años después del amor |
| 10 November | Liam Gallagher | C'Mon You Know World Tour |
| 12 November (Note: Originally scheduled to take place on 18 October 2020 but was postponed due to mandatory isolation in Argentina due to COVID-19.) | Michael Bublé | An Evening with Michael Bublé |
| 13 November | Alejandro Lerner | Lerner 4D a tu lado |
| 17 November | Nathy Peluso | Calambre Tour |
| 18 November | Nathy Peluso | Calambre Tour |
| 19 November | Joan Manuel Serrat | El Vicio de Cantar |
| 20 November | Joan Manuel Serrat | El Vicio de Cantar |
| 22 November | C Tangana | El Madrileño - Sin Cantar ni afinar LATAM Tour 22' |
| 23 November | C Tangana | El Madrileño - Sin Cantar ni afinar LATAM Tour 22' |
| 24 November | Andrés Calamaro | Calamaro Tour 2022 |
| 25 November | Joan Manuel Serrat | El Vicio de Cantar |
| 26 November | Joan Manuel Serrat | El Vicio de Cantar |
| 27 November | Andrés Calamaro | Calamaro Tour 2022 |
| 29 November | Joan Manuel Serrat | El Vicio de Cantar |
| 30 November | Ricky Martin | Ricky Martin Sinfónico |
| 1 December | Ricky Martin | Ricky Martin Sinfónico |
| 2 December | Eros Ramazzotti | Battito Infinito Tour |
| 3 December | Lali | Disciplina Tour |
| 4 December | Lali | Disciplina Tour |
| 6 December | Lit Killah | MAWZ Tour |
| 8 December | Slipknot | Knotfest 2022 |
| 7 December | Damas Gratis | — |
| 9 December | La K'onga | — |
| 10 December | Pimpinela | 40 Aniversario Sinfónico |
| 11 December | La K'onga | — |
| 12 December | La K'onga | |
| 13 December | Judas Priest | Knotfest 2022 |
| 15 December | Skay y Los Fakires | — |
| 16 December | Conociendo Rusia | — |
| 20 December | Servando & Florentino | En Tu Ciudad World Tour 2022 |
2023
| 6 January | David Guetta | — |
| 18 February | Feid | Ferxxo Nitro Jam Tour |
| 26 February | Calvin Harris | — |
| 4 March | Alejandro Fernández | Hecho en México |
| 7 March | Paramore | This Is Why Tour |
| 10 March | Camilo | De Adentro Pa’ Afuera Tour |
| 11 March | Camilo | De Adentro Pa’ Afuera Tour |
| 12 March | Joaquín Sabina | Contra Todo Pronóstico |
| 15 March | Joaquín Sabina | Contra Todo Pronóstico |
| 21 March | Joaquín Sabina | Contra Todo Pronóstico |
| 23 March | Joaquín Sabina | Contra Todo Pronóstico |
| 24 March | Rusherking | — |
| 27 March | Joaquín Sabina | Contra Todo Pronóstico |
| 1 April | Cristian Castro | Le Canta al Amor Tour |
| 14 April | Dillom | Post Mortem Tour |
| 15 April | Cazzu | Nena Trampa Tour |
| 16 April | Agrupación Los Capos | — |
| 29 April | Reik | En Cambio World Tour |
| 30 April | Los Palmeras | Campeones del Mundo |
| 4 May | Manuel Turizo | 2000 Tour |
| 5 May | Alejandro Sanz | Sanz En Vivo |
| 6 May | Alejandro Sanz | Sanz En Vivo |
| 7 May | Alicia Keys | Alicia + Keys World Tour |
| 11 May | Alejandro Sanz | Sanz En Vivo |
| 12 May | Alejandro Sanz | Sanz En Vivo |
| 13 May | El Cuarteto de Nos | Tour Lámina Once |
| 14 May | Alejandro Sanz | Sanz En Vivo |
| 16 May | Premios Carlos Gardel 2023 | |
| 18 May | Jackson Wang | Magic Man World Tour |
| 20 May | Airbag | Jinetes Cromados Tour |
| 21 May | Airbag | Jinetes Cromados Tour |
| 23 May | Kraftwerk | — |
| 26 May | Los Fabulosos Cadillacs | El León del Ritmo Tour |
| 27 May | Los Fabulosos Cadillacs | El León del Ritmo Tour |
| 2 June | Babasónicos | Trinchera |
| 3 June | Carlos Vives | El Tour de los 30 |
| 7 June | Los Ángeles Azules | Cumbia para el Corazón Tour |
| 8 June | Los Ángeles Azules | Cumbia para el Corazón Tour |
| 9 June | Caetano Veloso | Turne Meu Coco |
| 10 June | Sin Bandera | Frecuencia Tour |
| 12 June | Ke Personajes | — |
| 17 June | Q'Lokura | — |
| 18 June | Q'Lokura | — |
| 23 June | Carlos Rivera; Tiago PZK; La Mosca; MYA | Radio Disney En Vivo |
| 24 June | Catupecu Machu | — |
| 25 June | La Beriso | — |
| 30 June | Los Nocheros | — |
| 1 July | Las Pastillas del Abuelo | — |
| 2 July | Callejero Fino | — |
| 7 July | CNCO | — |
| 8 July | FiRE LEAGUE | |
| 15 July | Disney on Ice | |
| 16 July | Disney on Ice | |
| 18 July | Disney on Ice | |
| 19 July | Disney on Ice | |
| 20 July | Disney on Ice | |
| 21 July | Disney on Ice | |
| 22 July | Disney on Ice | |
| 23 July | Disney on Ice | |
| 25 July | Disney on Ice | |
| 26 July | Disney on Ice | |
| 27 July | Disney on Ice | |
| 28 July | Disney on Ice | |
| 3 August | Luis Miguel | Luis Miguel Tour 2023–24 |
| 4 August | Luis Miguel | Luis Miguel Tour 2023–24 |
| 5 August | Los Auténticos Decadentes | ADN |
| 6 August | Luis Miguel | Luis Miguel Tour 2023–24 |
| 8 August | Luis Miguel | Luis Miguel Tour 2023–24 |
| 9 August | Luis Miguel | Luis Miguel Tour 2023–24 |
| 10 August | Natalia Lafourcade | De todas las flores |
| 11 August | Las Pelotas | Seguimos Esperando el Milagro |
| 12 August | Luis Miguel | Luis Miguel Tour 2023–24 |
| 15 August | Luis Miguel | Luis Miguel Tour 2023–24 |
| 16 August | Luis Miguel | Luis Miguel Tour 2023–24 |
| 17 August | Luis Miguel | Luis Miguel Tour 2023–24 |
| 18 August | Luis Miguel | Luis Miguel Tour 2023–24 |
| 25 August | Eladio Carrión | The Sauce Tour |
| 26 August | Nicki Nicole | Nicki Nicole Abre su Alma |
| 27 August | Nicki Nicole | Nicki Nicole Abre su Alma |
| 1 September | Divididos | Gira 35 años |
| 2 September | Divididos | Gira 35 años |
| 7 September | Nicki Nicole | Nicki Nicole abre su alma |
| 8 September | Nicki Nicole | Nicki Nicole abre su alma |
| 15 September | Divididos | Gira 35 años |
| 16 September | Divididos | Gira 35 años |
| 24 September | Ghost | Imperatour |
| 1 October | Mora | Estela Tour |
| 6 October | Jorge Drexler | Tinta y Tiempo |
| 7 October | Jorge Drexler | Tinta y Tiempo |
| 13 October | Luciano Pereyra | Hasta el Alma Tour |
| 14 October | Luciano Pereyra | Hasta el Alma Tour |
| 17 October | Evanescence | South American Tour 2023 |
| 20 October | Nicki Nicole | Nicki Nicole Abre su Alma |
| 26 October | Marco Antonio Solís | El Buki World Tour |
| 28 October | Marco Antonio Solís | El Buki World Tour |
| 29 October | Måneskin | Rush! World Tour |
| 4 November | Morat | Si Ayer Fuera Hoy World |
| 5 November | Los Auténticos Decadentes | ADN |
| 7 November | Pablo Alborán | Tour LA CU4RTA HOJA |
| 8 November | Pablo Alborán | Tour LA CU4RTA HOJA |
| 10 November | Luciano Pereyra | Hasta el Alma Tour |
| 11 November | Luciano Pereyra | Hasta el Alma Tour |
| 14 November | TEDx Río de la Plata | |
| 15 November | Andrés Calamaro | — |
| 17 November | Gojira; Mastodon | The Mega-Monsters Tour 2023 |
| 23 November | Pulp | This is What We Do for an Encore 2023–2024 |
| 24 November | Carlos Rivera | Un Tour a Todas Partes |
| 25 November | Carlos Rivera | Un Tour a Todas Partes |
| 28 November | David Bisbal | Me siento vivo Tour |
| 1 December | Quevedo | DQE TOUR |
| 2 December | Diego Torres | — |
| 3 December | Diego Torres | — |
| 5 December | Enrique Bunbury | Shows Únicos |
| 7 December | Peso Pluma | La Doble P Tour |
| 8 December | Eruca Sativa | — |
| 11 December | OLGA y las bandas eternas | |
| 12 December | OLGA y las bandas eternas | |
| 13 December | Nicki Nicole | Nicki Nicole Abre su Alma |
| 15 December | Los Palmeras | — |
| 16 December | Robleis | — |
| 17 December | Robleis | — |
| 18 December | Aitana | Alpha Tour |
| 20 December | Ciro y los Persas | Despedida del año |
| 21 December | Ciro y los Persas | Despedida del año |
| 22 December | Ciro y los Persas | Despedida del año |
2024
| 6 January | David Guetta | — |
| 9 February | Slash feat. Myles Kennedy and The Conspirators | The River Is Rising Tour |
| 20 February | Maná | México Lindo y Querido Tour |
| 22 February | Maná | México Lindo y Querido Tour |
| 24 February | Maná | México Lindo y Querido Tour |
| 28 February | Laura Pausini | Laura Pausini World Tour |
| 2 March | Melendi | — |
| 3 March | Maná | México Lindo y Querido Tour |
| 5 March | Maná | México Lindo y Querido Tour |
| 7 March | Raphael | Victoria Tour |
| 9 March | Nicki Nicole | Nicki Nicole Abre su Alma |
| 10 March | Nicki Nicole | Nicki Nicole Abre su Alma |
| 22 March | Milo J | — |
| 23 March | Milo J | — |
| 4 April | Mon Laferte | Autopoiética Tour |
| 6 April | Emilia Mernes | .MP3 Tour |
| 7 April | Emilia Mernes | .MP3 Tour |
| 11 April | Dante Gebel | Presidante Tour |
| 12 April | Virus | — |
| 13 April | Megadeth | Crush the World Tour |
| 14 April | Megadeth | Crush the World Tour |
| 15 April | Tom Jones | Ages & Stages Tour |
| 16 April | Megadeth | Crush the World Tour |
| 19 April | Emilia Mernes | .MP3 Tour |
| 20 April | Emilia Mernes | .MP3 Tour |
| 21 April | Emilia Mernes | .MP3 Tour |
| 23 April | Emilia Mernes | .MP3 Tour |
| 25 April | Jonas Brothers | Five Albums. One Night. The World Tour |
| 26 April | Jonas Brothers | Five Albums. One Night. The World Tour |
| 27 April | Jonas Brothers | Five Albums. One Night. The World Tour |
| 4 May | David Lebón | Herencia Lebón |
| 9 May | Ana Gabriel | Un Deseo Más |
| 10 May | Luciano Pereyra | Hasta el Alma Tour |
| 11 May | Luciano Pereyra | Hasta el Alma Tour |
| 12 May | Dread Mar-I | — |
| 13 May | La K'onga | |
| 14 May | La K'onga | |
| 15 May | La K'onga | |
| 16 May | Luck Ra | El Baile del Año |
| 17 May | Luck Ra | El Baile del Año |
| 18 May | La Beriso | — |
| 20 May | La K'onga | — |
| 21 May | La K'onga | — |
| 22 May | Justin Quiles | La Esencia de J Qui |
| 24 May | Cultura Profética | Por Más |
| 25 May | La Vela Puerca | — |
| 28 May | Premios Carlos Gardel 2024 | |
| 29 May | Emilia | .MP3 Tour |
| 30 May | Emilia | .MP3 Tour |
| 31 May | Emilia | .MP3 Tour |
| 8 June | Camila | Tour CAMILA |
| 14 June | Babasónicos | — |
| 15 June | Babasónicos | — |
| 16 June | Él Mató a un Policía Motorizado | — |
| 18 June | Miranda! | — |
| 20 June | Miranda! | — |
| 21 June | Miranda! | — |
| 22 June | Miranda! | — |
| 13 July | Disney on Ice | |
| 14 July | Disney on Ice | |
| 16 July | Disney on Ice | |
| 17 July | Disney on Ice | |
| 18 July | Disney on Ice | |
| 19 July | Disney on Ice | |
| 20 July | Disney on Ice | |
| 21 July | Disney on Ice | |
| 23 July | Disney on Ice | |
| 24 July | Disney on Ice | |
| 25 July | Disney on Ice | |
| 26 July | Disney on Ice | |
| 1 August | Tan Biónica | La Última Noche Mágica Tour |
| 2 August | Tan Biónica | La Última Noche Mágica Tour |
| 3 August | Tan Biónica | La Última Noche Mágica Tour |
| 4 August | Tan Biónica | La Última Noche Mágica Tour |
| 8 August | Ciro y los Persas | — |
| 9 August | Ciro y los Persas | — |
| 10 August | Cruzando el Charco | — |
| 11 August | Q' Lokura | — |
| 12 August | OLGA: Se extraña a la nona | |
| 14 August | Christian Nodal | Pa'l Cora Tour |
| 16 August | Ca7riel y Paco Amoroso | Baño María |
| 17 August | Tan Biónica | La Última Noche Mágica Tour |
| 18 August | Tan Biónica | La Última Noche Mágica Tour |
| 20 August | Tan Biónica | La Última Noche Mágica Tour |
| 22 August | Carín León | Boca Chueca Tour 2024 |
| 23 August | El Kuelgue | Hola Precioso |
| 24 August | Dillom | Por Cesárea |
| 25 August | Dillom | Por Cesárea |
| 30 August | Ciro y los Persas | — |
| 31 August | El Cuarteto de Nos | Tour Lámina Once |
| 1 September | El Cuarteto de Nos | Tour Lámina Once |
| 6 September | Conociendo Rusia | Jet Love |
| 7 September | Conociendo Rusia | Jet Love |
| 9 September | Travis Scott | Circus Maximus Tour |
| 12 September | LIGA BAZOOKA | |
| 13 September | Los Palmeras | 51 años de clásicos |
| 14 September | El Plan de la Mariposa | — |
| 16 September | Barak | Edición X |
| 17 September | Joss Stone | ELLIPSIS SA Tour 2024 |
| 20 September | Las Pastillas del Abuelo | — |
| 21 September | Florencia Bertotti | Flor Bertotti en Concierto |
| 22 September | Florencia Bertotti | Flor Bertotti en Concierto |
| 24 September | Florencia Bertotti | Flor Bertotti en Concierto |
| 25 September | Florencia Bertotti | Flor Bertotti en Concierto |
| 27 September | Residente | Las Letras Ya No Importan Tour |
| 28 September | Residente | Las Letras Ya No Importan Tour |
| 2 October | Niall Horan | The Show: Live on Tour |
| 4 October | Los Palmeras | 51 años de clásicos |
| 5 October | Emanero | Emanero Tour 2024 |
| 12 October | Eric Prydz | Holo |
| 13 October | Q'Lokura | — |
| 15 October | Florencia Bertotti | Flor Bertotti en Concierto |
| 16 October | Florencia Bertotti | Flor Bertotti en Concierto |
| 17 October | NAFTA | NAFTA II |
| 19 October | Tan Biónica | La Última Noche Mágica Tour |
| 20 October | Tan Biónica | La Última Noche Mágica Tour |
| 22 October | Florencia Bertotti | Flor Bertotti en Concierto |
| 23 October | Florencia Bertotti | Flor Bertotti en Concierto |
| 24 October | Chaqueño Palavecino | 40 años |
| 26 October | Pimpinela | Siempre Juntos Tour 2024 |
| 30 October | Nathy Peluso | Grasa Tour |
| 1 November | El Kuelgue | Hola Precioso |
| 2 November | Luis Fonsi | 25 Años Tour |
| 4 November | Roberto Carlos | Roberto Carlos Tour |
| 5 November | The Smashing Pumpkins | The WorldI s a Vampire |
| 8 November | Florencia Bertotti | Flor Bertotti en Concierto |
| 9 November | Florencia Bertotti | Flor Bertotti en Concierto |
| 11 November | Fito Páez | PAEZ4030 |
| 12 November | Fito Páez | PAEZ4030 |
| 13 November | AURORA | What Happened to the Earth |
| 14 November | Keane | Hopes and Fears |
| 15 November | Fito Páez | PAEZ4030 |
| 16 November | Fito Páez | PAEZ4030 |
| 20 November | Diego Torres | Mejor que Ayer Tour |
| 21 November | David Bisbal | Me Siento Vivo Tour |
| 22 November | Toto | Dogz of Us |
| 23 November | Diego Torres | Mejor que Ayer Tour |
| 24 November | Pimpinela | Siempre Juntos Tour 2024 |
| 25 November | Florencia Bertotti | Flor Bertotti en Concierto |
| 26 November | Florencia Bertotti | Flor Bertotti en Concierto |
| 27 November | Lenny Kravitz | Blue Electric Light Tour 2024 |
| 28 November | Lenny Kravitz | Blue Electric Light Tour 2024 |
| 29 November | Andrés Calamaro | Agenda 1999 Tour |
| 30 November | Andrés Calamaro | Agenda 1999 Tour |
| 2 December | Iron Maiden | The Future Past World Tour |
| 3 December | Andrés Calamaro | Agenda 1999 Tour |
| 4 December | No Te Va Gustar | 30 Años |
| 5 December | No Te Va Gustar | 30 Años |
| 6 December | No Te Va Gustar | 30 Años |
| 7 December | No Te Va Gustar | 30 Años |
| 8 December | Bring Me the Horizon | NX_GN WRLD TOUR |
| 11 December | Un Poco de Ruido | Zapada 1° Aniversario |
| 12 December | Fito Páez | Aniversario 'Del 63' y 'Circo Beat' |
| 13 December | Fito Páez | Aniversario 'Del 63' y 'Circo Beat' |
| 14 December | Carlos Rivera | Carlos XX |
| 15 December | Carlos Rivera | Carlos XX |
| 18 December | Diego Torres | Mejor que Ayer Tour |
| 19 December | Dream Theater | 40th Anniversary Tour |
| 21 December | Divididos | — |
| 22 December | Divididos | — |
2025
| 28 January | Twenty One Pilots | The Clancy World Tour |
| 29 January | Twenty One Pilots | The Clancy World Tour |
| 5 February | Margarita en vivo | |
| 6 February | Margarita en vivo | |
| 7 February | Margarita en vivo | |
| 8 February | Margarita en vivo | |
| 9 February | Margarita en vivo | |
| 21 February | La Joaqui | — |
| 23 February | Sting | Sting 3.0 Tour |
| 24 February | Sting | Sting 3.0 Tour |
| 6 March | Ha*Ash | Haashville Tour |
| 8 March | Camilo | Nuestro Lugar Feliz Tour |
| 9 March | Camilo | Nuestro Lugar Feliz Tour |
| 14 March | Duki | Ameri World Tour |
| 15 March | Duki | Ameri World Tour |
| 16 March | Duki | Ameri World Tour |
| 20 March | Duki | Ameri World Tour |
| 21 March | Duki | Ameri World Tour |
| 22 March | Duki | Ameri World Tour |
| 23 March | Sergio Dalma | Gira Sonríe Porque Estás en la Foto |
| 24 March | Joaquín Sabina | Hola y Adiós |
| 26 March | Joaquín Sabina | Hola y Adiós |
| 29 March | Ismael Serrano | Ismael Serrano Sinfónico |
| 1 April | Incubus | Morning View / The Hits |
| 2 April | Joaquín Sabina | Hola y Adiós |
| 3 April | Justice | Justice Live 2025 |
| 4 April | Joaquín Sabina | Hola y Adiós |
| 6 April | Joaquín Sabina | Hola y Adiós |
| 9 April | Joaquín Sabina | Hola y Adiós |
| 11 April | Joaquín Sabina | Hola y Adiós |
| 13 April | Joaquín Sabina | Hola y Adiós |
| 16 April | Joaquín Sabina | Hola y Adiós |
| 18 April | Joaquín Sabina | Hola y Adiós |
| 24 April | Nonpalidece | Hecho en Jamaica |
| 26 April | Rels B | A New Star World Tour |
| 27 April | Rels B | A New Star World Tour |
| 1 May | Simple Minds | Global Tour 2025 |
| 9 May | Tiago PZK | Gotti A Tour |
| 10 May | Tiago PZK | Gotti A Tour |
| 15 May | The Pretenders | Latin America Tour |
| 16 May | Reik | Panorama |
| 17 May | LBC y Eugenia Quevedo | — |
| 19 May | LIGA BAZOOKA | |
| 20 May | Nile Rodgers & Chic | — |
| 21 May | No Te Va Gustar | — |
| 22 May | No Te Va Gustar | — |
| 23 May | Picus | Dreams Tour |
| 24 May | Q' Lokura | — |
| 25 May | Festival Patria | |
| 27 May | Hozier | Unreal Unearth Tour |
| 29 May | Duki | Ameri World Tour |
| 30 May | Duki | Ameri World Tour |
| 31 May | José Carreras | Gira Despedida Mundial |
| 1 June | El Puma & Los Palmeras | Una Noche de Oro |
| 2 June | Norah Jones | Visions Tour 2025 |
| 4 June | Milo J | 166 (Deluxe) Retirada |
| 5 June | Milo J | 166 (Deluxe) Retirada |
| 7 June | Paulo Londra | — |
| 8 June | Paulo Londra | — |
| 9 June | Emanero | El Último Sinvergüenza Tour |
| 10 June | Emanero | El Último Sinvergüenza Tour |
| 11 June | Ke Personajes | Preludios Tour |
| 12 June | Ke Personajes | Preludios Tour |
| 13 June | C.R.O | Malos Cantores World Tour 2025 |
| 16 June | Milo J | 166 (Deluxe) Retirada |
| 17 June | Milo J | 166 (Deluxe) Retirada |
| 19 June | Quevedo | Buenos Noches Tour |
| 20 June | Quevedo | Buenos Noches Tour |
| 26 June | Q' Lokura | — |
| 27 June | Diego Torres | Mejor que Ayer Tour |
| 28 June | Diego Torres | Mejor que Ayer Tour |
| 29 June | YSY A | YSY A Tour |
| 2 July | Bronco | Dejando Huella Tour |
| 3 July | Miguel Mateos | — |
| 4 July | Divididos | — |
| 5 July | Divididos | — |
| 6 July | LBC y Eugenia Quevedo | — |
| 17 July | Disney on Ice | |
| 18 July | Disney on Ice | |
| 19 July | Disney on Ice | |
| 20 July | Disney on Ice | |
| 21 July | Disney on Ice | |
| 22 July | Disney on Ice | |
| 23 July | Disney on Ice | |
| 24 July | Disney on Ice | |
| 25 July | Disney on Ice | |
| 26 July | Disney on Ice | |
| 27 July | Disney on Ice | |
| 28 July | Disney on Ice | |
| 29 July | Disney on Ice | |
| 30 July | Disney on Ice | |
| 7 August | Kylie Minogue | Tension Tour |
| 13 August | El Kuelgue | — |
| 14 August | Bandalos Chinos | Vándalos Tour |
| 15 August | Ado | Hibana WORLD TOUR 2025 |
| 16 August | Mora | Los Mismo de la Otra Vez Tour |
| 17 August | Mora | Los Mismo de la Otra Vez Tour |
| 18 August | Manuel Turizo | 201 Tour |
| 29 August | Erreway | Juntos Otra Vez |
| 30 August | Erreway | Juntos Otra Vez |
| 2 September | Jesse & Joy | El Despecho Tour |
| 3 September | Erreway | Juntos Otra Vez |
| 4 September | Erreway | Juntos Otra Vez |
| 6 September | Las Pastillas del Abuelo | — |
| 7 September | Las Pastillas del Abuelo | — |
| 9 September | Katy Perry | The Lifetimes Tour |
| 10 September | Katy Perry | The Lifetimes Tour |
| 11 September | Lionel Richie | Say Hello to the Hits! |
| 12 September | Iggy Pop | — |
| 13 September | Cazzu | Latinaje En Vivo |
| 14 September | Cazzu | Latinaje En Vivo |
| 15 September | Cazzu | Latinaje En Vivo |
| 16 September | Erreway | Juntos Otra Vez |
| 17 September | Erreway | Juntos Otra Vez |
| 18 September | Luciano Mellera | El Unipersonal de Lucho Mellera |
| 19 September | Fatboy Slim | — |
| 22 September | El Puma & Los Palmeras | Una Noche de Oro |
| 23 September | Erreway | Juntos Otra Vez |
| 24 September | Erreway | Juntos Otra Vez |
| 25 September | Avenged Sevenfold | Life is But a Dream Tour |
| 26 September | Los Auténticos Decadentes | Tour 30 Años |
| 27 September | Los Auténticos Decadentes | Tour 30 Años |
| 28 September | Danny Ocean | Reflexa Tour |
| 1 October | Rubén Rada & Agárrate Catalina | Terapia de Música |
| 2 October | Beéle | — |
| 3 October | Luciano Pereyra | Te Sigo Amando Tour |
| 4 October | Luciano Pereyra | Te Sigo Amando Tour |
| 5 October | Luciano Pereyra | Te Sigo Amando Tour |
| 10 October | Los Caballeros de la Quema | — |
| 11 October | Silvio Rodríguez | — |
| 12 October | Silvio Rodríguez | — |
| 13 October | Valentino Merlo | — |
| 14 October | Il Volo | Live in Concert 2025 |
| 15 October | Carlos Vives | El Rock de Mi Pueblo Vive |
| 16 October | Cardellino | — |
| 17 October | Camila | Regresa Tour |
| 18 October | Rauw Alejandro | Cosa Nuestra World Tour |
| 19 October | Rauw Alejandro | Cosa Nuestra World Tour |
| 20 October | Rauw Alejandro | Cosa Nuestra World Tour |
| 21 October | Silvio Rodríguez | — |
| 22 October | Rod Stewart | One Last Time |
| 23 October | Rod Stewart | One Last Time |
| 24 October | Rod Stewart | One Last Time |
| 25 October | Conociendo Rusia | — |
| 28 October | Juanes | — |
| 30 October | Eladio Carrión | Don KBRN World Tour |
| 1 November | Cazzu | Latinaje En Vivo |
| 22 November | Luciano Pereyra | Te Sigo Amando Tour |
| 23 November | Luciano Pereyra | Te Sigo Amando Tour |
| 19 December | Nadie Dice Nada - LUZU TV | El Ultimo Show |
2026
| 1 October | Robbie Williams | Britpop Tour |
| 2 October | Robbie Williams | Britpop Tour |
| 4 October | Robbie Williams | Britpop Tour |
| 7 October | Soy Luna | Soy Luna Tour - El Ultimo Show |
| 7 October | Soy Luna | Soy Luna Tour - El Ultimo Show |
