= En la Intimidad =

En la Intimidad may refer to:

- "En la Intimidad" (Thalía song), 1991
- "En la Intimidad" (Big One, Emilia and Callejero Fino song), 2023
