= La Playlist =

Single by Emilia
- Language: Spanish
- Released: 20 June 2024
- Genre: Dance-pop
- Label: Sony Latin
- Songwriters: María Emilia Mernes; Daniel Ismael Real; Enzo Ezequiel Sauthier
- Producer: Big One

Emilia singles chronology
| "Perdonarte, ¿Para Qué?" (2024) | "La Playlist" (2024) | "Alegría" (2024) |

Music video
- "La Playlist" on YouTube

"La Playlist" (stylized as "La_Playlist.mpeg") is a song by Argentine singer Emilia, released on 20 June 2024 through Sony Music Latin. She wrote it with Enzo Ezequiel Sauthier and its producer Daniel Ismael Real, also known as Big One. A dance-pop song with elements of electropop, "La Playlist" follows the 2000s-influenced concept of her previous album, .MP3 (2023). An accompanying music video directed by Ballve was released alongside it. The single peaked within the top 10 on the Argentina Hot 100 and Uruguay, and the top 40 in Spain. It has also charted on airplay charts in the first two countries, Chile, Colombia, Ecuador, and Peru.

== Background and promotion ==
Following the release of her 2000s-influenced second studio album, .MP3 (2023), Emilia Mernes shared an exclusive playlist titled "Mala pero Cutie" that contained pop songs which its initials form the title of her upcoming song, "La Playlist.mpeg". On 15 June 2024, she officially announced on her social media accounts the release date of the song, 20 June 2024, and the premiere times. On the following day, she previewed the music video for the track, referencing a "new era".

To support the song's release, Emilia held a personalized event in Madrid. "La Playlist" was released alongside a music video directed by Ballve; in the video, Emilia can be seen working at the counter of a video store with a portable media player. It evokes 1990s and 2000s pop culture music videos. Emilia added "La Playlist" to the revamped set list of her third concert tour, the .MP3 Tour. Emilia performed the song, alongside her collaboration with Los Ángeles Azules titled "Perdonarte, ¿Para Qué?", at the 2024 edition of the Premios Juventud.

== Composition ==
"La Playlist" is a dance-pop song inspired by the 2000s aesthetic, following the concept of her previous second studio album, .MP3. It also contains influences from 1990s electropop. Isabela Raygoza for Billboard compared the song to "Boom, Boom, Boom, Boom!!" by Dutch Eurodance music group Vengaboys. The critic also wrote that, on the song, Emilia "seamlessly fuses decades and technology, positioning itself at the forefront of a musical renaissance that is both nostalgic and innovative".

== Charts ==
Chart performance for "La Playlist"
| Chart (2024) | Peak position |
|---|---|
| Argentina Hot 100 (Billboard) | 10 |
| Argentina Airplay (Monitor Latino) | 9 |
| Chile Airplay (Monitor Latino) | 5 |
| Colombia Airplay (Monitor Latino) | 13 |
| Ecuador Airplay (Monitor Latino) | 1 |
| Peru Airplay (Monitor Latino) | 18 |
| Spain (PROMUSICAE) | 39 |
| Uruguay (CUD) | 8 |
| Uruguay Airplay (Monitor Latino) | 6 |
