= Como Si No Importara =

2021 single by Emilia and Duki

Single by Emilia and Duki

from the album Tú Crees en Mí?
- Language: Spanish
- Released: 13 July 2021
- Genre: Latin trap; reggaeton; pop; urban
- Length: 2:53
- Label: Sony Latin
- Songwriters: FMK; Big One; Emilia; Duki
- Producer: Big One

Emilia singles chronology
"Perreito Salvaje" (2021)	"Como Si No Importara" (2021)	"Rápido Lento" (2021)

Duki singles chronology
"Bailando Te Conocí" (2021)	"Como Si No Importara" (2021)	"YaMeFui" (2021)

Music video
- "Como Si No Importara" on YouTube

"Como Si No Importara" (English: "As If It Doesn't Matter") is a song by Argentine singer Emilia and Argentine rapper Duki. They wrote it along with FMK and its producer, Big One. The song was released on July 13, 2021, through Sony Music Latin, as the lead single from Emilia's debut studio album, Tú Crees en Mí? (2022).

The song received a nomination for the 2022 Premios Tu Música Urbano in the Video Of The Year category. "Como Si No Importara" peaked at number three on the Billboard Argentina Hot 100 and reached the top 20 in Paraguay and Uruguay. It was also the first song by the singers to chart on the Billboard Global Excl. US, peaking at number 126.

== Background and composition ==
On July 11, 2021, the singers mysteriously replied to each other's tweets with song snippets, causing fans to conspire about a collaboration. The official announcement of the single, along with a preview, was posted by Emilia on her social media one day before the release, on July 12, 2021.

Emilia said about the song: "It started my new musical era, and I feel with it an essence and identity of what I feel I wanted to be. I had the pleasure of sharing it with Duki, who is an artist and a reference that inspires me a lot."

== Music video ==
The music video shoot took place in a penthouse in North Miami, Florida. "It is rumored that Frank Sinatra stayed in this penthouse during his best moments, and I thought it was ideal for an intimate encounter between the two artists, immersed in a luxurious vintage aesthetic", said Argentine director Martin Seipel, who also produced some of her previous songs like "Perreito Salvaje".

== Live performances ==
On February 24, 2022, Emilia and Duki performed "Como Si No Importara" for the first time at the Premios Lo Nuestro.

== Charts ==
=== Weekly charts ===
Chart (2021)	Peak position
Argentina Hot 100 (Billboard)	3
Global Excl. US (Billboard)	126
Paraguay (Monitor Latino)	9
Spain (PROMUSICAE)	88
Uruguay (Monitor Latino)	16

=== Monthly charts ===
Chart (2021)	Peak position
Paraguay (SGP)	11
Uruguay (CUD)	2

== Certifications ==
Region	Certification	Certified units/sales
Argentina (CAPIF)	4× Platinum	80,000^{‡}
Chile	Gold	
Mexico (AMPROFON)	Gold	70,000^{‡}
United States (RIAA)	Gold (Latin)	30,000^{‡}
Uruguay (CUD)	3× Platinum	
^{‡} Sales+streaming figures based on certification alone.
