= Jet Set (Emilia and Nathy Peluso song) =

2024 single by Emilia and Nathy Peluso

Single by Emilia and Nathy Peluso

from the album .MP3
- Released: January 11, 2024
- Genre: Pop; urban
- Length: 2:25
- Label: Sony Latin
- Songwriters: María Emilia Mernes; Mauro Ezequiel Lombardo "Duki"; Nathy Peluso
- Producers: Zecca; Big One

Emilia singles chronology
"Una Foto" (Remix) (2024)	"Jet Set" (2024)	"Tú y Yo" (2024)

Nathy Peluso singles chronology
"Ella Tiene" (2023)	"Jet Set" (2024)	"Aprender a Amar" (2024)

Music video
- "Jet Set" on YouTube

"Jet Set" (stylized as "JET_Set.mp3") is a song by Argentine singers Emilia and Nathy Peluso, released via Sony Music Latin on 11 January 2024, as the seventh and final single from Emilia's second stubio album .MP3 (2023). The song was written by the artists along with Duki, and produced by Zecca and Big One. Described as a "seductive" pop song with elements of urban music, its lyrics "celebrate the top of the game without worrying about love."

== Background ==
"Jet Set" was announced as part of the tracklist for Emilia's second studio album .MP3 on 30 November 2023. It was not released on the day of the album's release, but months later, on 11 January 2024. Explaining this, the singer said: "I really wanted to give it a high priority and have people leave with a little bit of expectation, give the album a little more life."

== Composition ==
"Jet Set" is two minutes and 25 seconds long. It was written by Emilia, Peluso, and Duki. Big One and Zecca handled engineering and produced the song, while the latter mixed and mastered it. John Eddie Pérez and Mayra del Valle were the A&R director and A&R coordinator respectively. The song was described as a pop track with influences from urban music, and its lyrics "celebrate the top of the game without worrying about love."

== Music video ==
Directed by Facundo Ballve, the music video for "Jet Set" was released via Emilia's Vevo channel on YouTube on 11 January, along with the release of the song. Described as "powerful and explosive", it shows a "futuristic and cinematic aesthetic" with references to the 2000s and scenes inspired by The Matrix and Charlie's Angels. The video clip also has influences from the films Lara Croft: Tomb Raider (2001), and Kill Bill: Volume 1 (2003), also containing inspiration from the music video of the Taylor Swift's 2014 song "Bad Blood."

== Credits and personnel ==
Credits are adapted from Qobuz.

- Emilia – vocals, songwriter
- Nathy Peluso – vocals, songwriter
- Big One – producer, engineering
- Zecca – producer, mastering, mixing, engineering
- John Eddie Pérez – A&R director
- Mayra del Valle – A&R coordinator
- Duki – songwriter

== Charts ==
Chart performance for "Jet_Set"
Chart (2024)	Peak position
Argentina Hot 100 (Billboard)	30
Spain (PROMUSICAE)	58
