= La Original =

2023 single by Emilia and Tini

Single by Emilia and Tini

from the album .MP3
- Language: Spanish
- Released: 2 November 2023
- Genre: Electropop; house
- Length: 2:20
- Label: Sony Latin
- Songwriters: Andrés Torres; Maria Emilia Mernes "Emilia"; Martina Stoessel; Mauricio Rengifo; Mauro Ezequiel Lombardo "Duki"
- Producers: Andrés Torres; Mauricio Rengifo

Emilia singles chronology
| "GTA" (2023) | "La Original" (2023) | "Exclusive" (2023) |

Tini singles chronology
| "Lágrimas" (2023) | "La Original" (2023) | "Pa" (2024) |

Music video
- "La Original" on YouTube

"La Original" (stylized as "La_Original.mp3") is a song by Argentine singers Emilia and Tini. It was released on 2 November 2023 through Sony Music Latin as the fifth single from Emilia's second studio album, .MP3, in tandem with the record.

The song was co-written by both artists alongside rapper Duki and its producers Andrés Torres and Mauricio Rengifo.

== Background and release ==
On October 20, 2023, Emilia revealed the tracklist for her second studio album, .MP3, but kept the artists she collaborated with a secret. On October 29, the singer disclosed that "La Original" would be a collaboration with Tini. Two days later, both artists announced the song's release with a teaser on their social media accounts. "La Original" was made available for digital download and streaming on November 3, three hours before the debut of the album it is on.

== Composition ==
"La Original" is an electropop and house song. Regarding the meaning of the song, Emilia mentioned:

"I always try to show all parts of myself, but I feel like with all the criticism we sometimes face, we hide and don't want to show our true selves. "La Original" is about that. With all the criticism, you sometimes hide and you avoid showing more of yourself in fear of what they'll say about you. Tini and I decided to do the opposite and show that it's okay to "portarse mal" when there's no one there to judge or point fingers".

== Music video ==
The accompanying music video for "La Original" was directed by Francisco Ballve and released simultaneously with the song on Emilia's YouTube/VEVO channel. It shows both artists modeling and dancing on a runway in signature 2000s outfits. The video ends with Emilia giving Tini a kiss, which has been described as a reference to the kiss between Madonna and Britney Spears at the 2003 MTV Video Music Awards.

== Charts ==
Chart performance for "La Original"
| Chart (2023–24) | Peak position |
|---|---|
| Argentina Hot 100 (Billboard) | 1 |
| Argentina Airplay (Monitor Latino) | 2 |
| Bolivia (Monitor Latino) | 16 |
| Central America (Monitor Latino) | 15 |
| Chile (Monitor Latino) | 2 |
| Colombia (Monitor Latino) | 13 |
| Ecuador Pop (Monitor Latino) | 1 |
| Global 200 (Billboard) | 169 |
| Paraguay (SGP) | 4 |
| Paraguay (Monitor Latino) | 3 |
| Peru (Monitor Latino) | 6 |
| Panama (PRODUCE) | 34 |
| Panama Airplay (Monitor Latino) | 1 |
| Spain (PROMUSICAE) | 8 |
| Uruguay (Monitor Latino) | 3 |
| Uruguay (CUD) | 4 |
| US Latin Airplay (Billboard) | 26 |
| US Latin Pop Airplay (Billboard) | 3 |

== Certifications ==
Certifications for "La Original"
| Region | Certification | Certified units/sales |
|---|---|---|
| Mexico (AMPROFON) | Gold | 70,000^{‡} |
| Spain (Promusicae) | 3× Platinum | 180,000^{‡} |
| United States (RIAA) | Platinum (Latin) | 60,000^{‡} |
^{‡} Sales+streaming figures based on certification alone.

== Release history ==
| Region | Date | Format(s) | Label | Ref. |
|---|---|---|---|---|
| Various | 2 November 2023 | Digital download; streaming | Sony Latin | |

== See also ==
- List of best-selling singles in Spain
