= Perdonarte, ¿Para Qué? =

2024 single by Los Ángeles Azules and Emilia

Single by Los Ángeles Azules and Emilia
- Released: 23 May 2024
- Genre: Mexican cumbia
- Length: 3:13
- Label: Promotodo México
- Songwriters: Andy Clay; Horacio Palencia; Richard Torres
- Producer: Rodolfo Lugo

Los Ángeles Azules singles chronology
"Felicítalo" (2024)	"Perdonarte, ¿Para Qué?" (2024)	"Volver a Empezar" (2024)

Emilia singles chronology
"Tú y Yo" (2024)	"Perdonarte, ¿Para Qué?" (2024)	"La Playlist" (2024)

Music video
- "Perdonarte, ¿Para Qué?" on YouTube

"Perdonarte, ¿Para Qué?" (lit. 'Forgive You, For What?') is a song by Mexican group Los Ángeles Azules and Argentine singer Emilia. It was released on 23 May 2024 through Promotodo México. The song was written by Andy Clay, Horacio Palencia, and Richard Torres, while Rodolfo Lugo handled its production. A Mexican cumbia song, its lyrics deal with a relationship that comes back when it is too late.

A music video for the song, directed by Christian Schmid and produced by Laura Velez was released alongside it. It shows Emilia trying to be the band's vocalist, from her first audition to her debut as a singer in a concert. "Perdonarte, ¿Para Qué?" topped the Argentina Hot 100, the US Latin Airplay and Regional Mexican Airplay charts, and the Uruguayan CUD chart. It also reached the top 10 in Bolivia and Paraguay, and top 20 in Peru. Additionally, it peaked at number 35 on the US Hot Latin Songs chart 35 and at number 87 on the Global Excl. US chart.

== Background ==
In 2024, after releasing their twenty-seventh studio album, Se Agradece, the Mexican band Los Ángeles Azules signed a musical contract with Virgin Music Group in the United States and its territory Puerto Rico. The album featured a collaboration with Argentine singer María Becerra titled "El Amor de Mi Vida". Following the cancellation of some of Emilia Mernes' shows on her .MP3 Tour, in promotion of her second studio album .MP3 (2023), the singer was revealed as the guest artist for Los Ángeles Azules' next song in May 2024. The Mexican band posted a video on their official Instagram account and captioned it: "Auditions today, 'Perdonarte, ¿Para Qué?'... We were about to finish the auditions and, unexpectedly, the voice we were looking for arrived". Later, they uploaded other videos in which they approved Emilia's fake audition, and subsequently announced the premiere of the song "Perdonarte, ¿Para Qué?" for 23 May 2024. The singer expressed her honor and enthusiasm for collaborating with the group on her social media accounts, while sharing a snippet of the track.

== Composition and lyrics ==
"Perdonarte, ¿Para Qué?" was produced by Rodolfo Lugo and written by Andy Clay, Horacio Palencia, and Richard Torres. It is a Mexican cumbia song, a genre familiar to the band. It marked a departure from Emilia's usual musical style; however, in her beginnings as a singer, she was the vocalist of the Uruguayan cumbia band Rombai. The lyrics of the song are about a love that goes away and when it comes back, it is too late.

== Commercial performance ==
Named as the Hot Shot Debut of the Week, "Perdonarte, ¿Para Qué?" debuted at number three on the Argentina Hot 100 issued for 8 June 2024, published by Billboard Argentina. It earned the band their third top 10 on the chart and first entry of the year, while it was Emilia's 16th top 10. In its second week, it reached number one, being Los Ángeles Azules' third chart-topper and Emilia's fifth. It remained in place for three weeks, being the fourth song to spend at least three weeks at the summit in 2024, after "Una Foto (Remix)", "Bésame (Remix)", and "Hola Perdida (Remix)". In the United States, the song topped the Latin Airplay chart in the week dated June 20 with 8.1 million audience impressions, being both acts' first number-one single. Emilia become the first Argentinian woman to land atop the chart since Maria Becerra with “Te Espero” in June 2022. Additionally, "Perdonarte, ¿Para Qué?" also topped the Regional Mexican Airplay, being the Greatest Gainer of the week issued the same date. Besides of airplay, the song also charted at number 35 on the US Hot Latin Songs chart.

Outside of the United States and Argentina, "Perdonarte, ¿Para Qué?" topped the Cámara Uruguaya de Productores de Fonogramas y Videogramas' chart in Uruguay. On 18 July 2024, Infobae reported that "Perdonarte, ¿Para Qué?" was in the number three position of the most listened to songs in Uruguay. The song reached the top 20 in the Billboard charts in Bolivia, Peru, and the Sociedad de Gestión de Productores Fonográficos del Paraguay chart in Paraguay. It also charted at number 24 in Chile, 85 in Spain, and 87 on the Global Excl. US chart.

== Music video ==
The official music video for "Perdonarte, ¿Para Qué?" was released on 23 May 2024, along with the song. It was directed by Christian Schmid and produced by Laura Velez, while being filmed in Mexico City. It stars a singer, Emilia, who auditions to become the singer of Los Ángeles Azules, and shows from her first attempt to her first concert with the band.

== Live performances ==
After its release, Emilia included the track in the regular set list to her .MP3 Tour. Both acts performed "Perdonarte, ¿Para Qué? at the 2024 edition of the Premios Juventud on 25 July 2024, in San Juan, Puerto Rico.

== Charts ==
Chart performance for "Perdonarte, ¿Para Qué?"
Chart (2024)	Peak position
Argentina Hot 100 (Billboard)	1
Bolivia (Billboard)	3
Chile (Billboard)	24
Global Excl. US (Billboard)	87
Paraguay (SGP)	9
Peru (Billboard)	20
Spain (Promusicae)	85
Uruguay (CUD)	1
US Hot Latin Songs (Billboard)	35
US Latin Airplay (Billboard)	1
US Regional Mexican Airplay (Billboard)	1
