= Carita Triste =

2024 single by Ana Mena and Emilia

Single by Ana Mena and Emilia
- English title: "Sad Face"
- Released: August 30, 2024
- Genre: Pop; dance-pop; electropop
- Length: 2:55
- Label: Sony Spain
- Songwriters: Ana Mena; María Emilia Mernes; Andrés Torres; Mauricio Rengifo; Sara Schell Guedez
- Producers: Andrés Torres; Mauricio Rengifo

Ana Mena singles chronology
"Cinema spento" (2024)	"Carita Triste" (2024)

Emilia singles chronology
"Alegría" (2024)	"Carita Triste" (2024)	"Novio Gangsta" (2024)

Music video
- "Carita Triste" on YouTube

"Carita Triste" is a song by Spanish singer Ana Mena and Argentine singer Emilia. Written by Mena, Emilia, Sara Schell Guedez, Andrés Torres and Mauricio Rengifo, and produced by the latter two, the song was released by Sony Music Spain on 30 August 2024. It marks the second collaboration between Mena and Emilia, following the 2019 single "El Chisme".

== Music video ==
An accompanying music video for "Carita Triste" directed by The Panda Bear Show was released the same day the song premiered. The clip illustrates a failed romantic relationship in which both singers are betrayed by the same man. Instead of succumbing to their pain, they choose to exact revenge, all set to an "irresistibly danceable melody".

=== Synopsis ===
The music video begins with Ana Mena and Emilia moving into a mansion on the outskirts of town, where they are seen enjoying time with a man played by top model Xavier Serrano. As the narrative unfolds, the two women discover that they have both been deceived by the same man. In response to the betrayal, Mena and Emilia transform their appearances from innocent to vengeful. They crash a high-society family gathering, armed with golf clubs, and proceed to destroy the opulent setting. The video features a dramatic scene where they pour wine over the man, reminiscent of the blood scene in Stephen King's Carrie, but with a "less macabre twist".

== Charts ==
Weekly chart performance for "Carita Triste"
Chart (2024)	Peak position
Argentina Hot 100 (Billboard)	18
Argentina Airplay (Monitor Latino)	7
Bolivia (Monitor Latino)	13
Ecuador Pop (Monitor Latino)	5
Paraguay Pop (Monitor Latino)	9
Spain (PROMUSICAE)	6
Spain Airplay (Monitor Latino)	7
Spain Top 50 Radios (PROMUSICAE)	7

== Certifications ==
Certifications for "Carita Triste"
Region	Certification	Certified units/sales
Argentina (CAPIF)	Gold	10,000^{‡}
Spain (PROMUSICAE)	Platinum	60,000^{‡}
^{‡} Sales+streaming figures based on certification alone.
