= Jagger (song) =

2023 single by Emilia

Single by Emilia

from the album .MP3
- Language: Spanish
- Released: 30 March 2023
- Genre: Dance pop; urban pop
- Length: 2:35
- Label: Sony Latin
- Songwriters: Francisco Zecca; Emilia; Duki
- Producer: Zecca

Emilia singles chronology
"Tu Recuerdo" (2023)	"Jagger" (2023)	"No Se Ve" (2023)

Music video
- "Jagger" on YouTube

"Jagger" (stylized as "Jagger.mp3") is a song by Argentine singer Emilia. She wrote it along with Duki and its producer Francisco Zecca. The song was released on March 30, 2023, through Sony Music Latin, as the lead single from Emilia's second studio album .MP3.

It is a nostalgic song to the culture of the 2000s, with elements of dance pop, urban pop and hip hop, with references in the music video to Beyoncé, Christina Aguilera and Missy Elliott.

== Background and composition ==
The official announcement of the song, together with a snippet, was published by Emilia on her social networks one day before the release, on March 29, 2023. "Jagger" is a dance pop and urban pop song with elements of hip hop.

== Music video ==
The video was described as "funky and powerful", combining "vibrantly" modern styles with vintage touches. It was directed by Facundo Ballve and has references to Christina Aguilera, Missy Elliott, Ciara, and more. It was also compared to video clips by the band Destiny's Child, led by Beyoncé. Emilia has expressed her admiration for the group, having used an interpolation from "Independent Women Part I" in her song "La Chain".

Emilia is the star of the clip, who, accompanied by her dancers, highlights 2000s fashion by wearing low-waisted pants and skirts, large sunglasses, tops, XL earrings, and headscarves, a style that predominates in Argentina.

== Charts ==
Chart performance for "Jagger"
Chart (2023)	Peak position
Argentina Hot 100 (Billboard)	5
Argentina (Monitor Latino)	11
Argentina (CAPIF)	8
Uruguay (Monitor Latino)	15
Uruguay (CUD)	16

== See also ==
- List of Billboard Argentina Hot 100 top-ten singles in 2023
