= No Se Ve =

2023 single by Emilia and Ludmilla

Single by Emilia and Ludmilla

from the album .MP3
- Language: Spanish; Portuguese
- Released: 3 May 2023
- Genre: Funk carioca; urban; EDM
- Length: 3:23
- Label: WK
- Songwriters: Duki; Emilia; Ludmilla; Francisco Zecca
- Producer: Zecca

Emilia singles chronology
| "Jagger" (2023) | "No Se Ve" (2023) | "Los del Espacio" (2023) |

Ludmilla singles chronology
| "Solteiras Shake" (2023) | "No Se Ve" (2023) | "Zangadinha" (2023) |

Music video
- "No Se Ve" on YouTube

"No Se Ve" (stylized as "No_se_ve.mp3") is a song by Argentine singer Emilia and Brazilian singer Ludmilla. They wrote it in collaboration with Duki and its producer Francisco Zecca. The song was released on 3 May 2023, through WK Records, as the second single from Emilia's second studio album .MP3.

== Background and release ==
On 1 May 2023, Emilia posted a mysterious photo on her social media, hinting that an announcement for a new song was coming soon. A day later, and a day before the song's release, the official announcement and a preview of the music video were posted.

The song's music video was released exclusively on Instagram Reels for two days before its release on YouTube, being the first artists to do so. Hours after the release, the song reached number one on the iTunes songs chart in Brazil, being the first song by the Argentine singer to do so.

== Lyrics and composition ==
"No Se Ve" is a funk carioca song with elements of urban and electronic dance music. On the song, Emilia maintains the 2000s-inspired style and sound she's had on "Jagger", "La Chain" and her debut album, Tú Crees en Mí?. This same style can be seen reflected in the title of the single, "No_se_ve.mp3", which represents the format of an mp3 file.

== Live performances ==
The singers performed the song at the inaugural Billboard Latin Women in Music.

== Critical reception ==
Billboard ranked the song sixth on its list of Best Latin Songs of 2023 So Far, published on 14 July of that same year, qualifying it as "an instant banger at first stream."

== Charts ==
Chart performance for "No Se Ve"
| Chart (2023) | Peak position |
|---|---|
| Argentina Hot 100 (Billboard) | 5 |
| Argentina Airplay (Monitor Latino) | 9 |
| Argentina (CAPIF) | 6 |
| Brazil Airplay (Crowley Charts) | 77 |
| Brazil International Pop Airplay (Crowley Charts) | 6 |
| Brazil Latin Airplay (Crowley Charts) | 1 |
| Chile (Monitor Latino) | 5 |
| Ecuador (Monitor Latino) | 1 |
| Global Excl. US (Billboard) | 158 |
| Paraguay (SGP) | 73 |
| Spain (PROMUSICAE) | 13 |
| Uruguay (CUD) | 4 |
| Uruguay Airplay (Monitor Latino) | 3 |
| US Latin Pop Airplay (Billboard) | 17 |

== Certifications ==
Certifications for "No Se Ve"
| Region | Certification | Certified units/sales |
|---|---|---|
| Brazil (Pro-Música Brasil) | Gold | 20,000^{‡} |
| Spain (Promusicae) | 5× Platinum | 300,000^{‡} |
| United States (RIAA) | Gold (Latin) | 30,000^{‡} |
^{‡} Sales+streaming figures based on certification alone.

== Release history ==
Release history for "No Se Ve"
| Region | Date | Format(s) | Version | Label | Ref. |
|---|---|---|---|---|---|
| Various | May 3, 2023 | Digital download; streaming | Original | WK | |

== See also ==
- List of best-selling singles in Spain
- List of Billboard Argentina Hot 100 top-ten singles in 2023
