= En la Intimidad (Big One, Emilia and Callejero Fino song) =

Single by Big One, Emilia and Callejero Fino
- Released: February 1, 2023
- Genre: Reggaeton; pop; RKT; cumbia
- Length: 2:45
- Label: Fifty One
- Songwriters: Big One; Emilia; Callejero Fino
- Producer: Big One

Big One singles chronology
"Además de Mí" (2020)	"En la Intimidad" (2023)	"Un Finde" (2023)

Emilia singles chronology
"El Plan" (2022)	"En la Intimidad" (2023)	"Uno los Dos" (2023)

Callejero Fino singles chronology
"Que te Vaya Bien" (2023)	"En la Intimidad" (2023)	"Mío No Tuyo" (2023)

Music video
- "En la Intimidad" on YouTube

"En la Intimidad" (Note: Subtitled "Crossover #1".) is a song written and recorded by Argentine producer Big One and Argentine singers Emilia and Callejero Fino. The song was released on February 1, 2023, through Fifty One, and is the first single in a series of Big One collaborations titled "Crossovers".

For seven consecutive weeks, the song topped the Billboard Argentina Hot 100. It was the three artists' first song to chart on the Billboard Global 200 and its parallel Global Excl. US, at position 171 and 78, respectively.

== Composition ==
"En la Intimidad" is two minutes and 45 seconds long. It is a mix of the musical genres reggaeton, pop, RKT and Argentine cumbia.

== Commercial performance ==
"En la Intimidad" debuted at number nine on the Billboard Argentina Hot 100 achieving the Hot Shot Debut, being the song that debuted the highest in the week ending on February 19. A week after, it reached a new peak of two. In its third week, it peaked at number one and stayed there for seven consecutive weeks. It marked the first song for the three artists to top the chart. Globally, the song charted on the Billboard Global 200 and on its parallel Global Excl. US, at position 171 and 78, respectively. Elsewhere, the song peaked at number eight in Bolivia, number nine in Uruguay, and number 13 in the Paraguayan Sociedad de Gestión de Productores Fonográficos del Paraguay monthly digital chart. It also topped the Cámara Uruguaya de Productores de Fonogramas y Videogramas monthly digital chart.

== Charts ==
Chart (2023)	Peak position
Argentina Hot 100 (Billboard)	1
Bolivia (Billboard)	8
Global 200 (Billboard)	171
Paraguay (SPG)	7
Uruguay (CUD)	1
Uruguay Airplay (Monitor Latino)	9
