= .MP3 (album) =

2023 studio album by Emilia

Studio album by Emilia
- Released: 3 November 2023
- Genres: Pop; R&B; dance-pop; hip-hop; urban
- Length: 35:50
- Language: Spanish
- Labels: Sony Latin; WK
- Producers: Big One; Mauricio Rengifo; Andrés Torres; Valyum; Zecca

Emilia chronology
Tú Crees en Mí? (2022)	.MP3 (2023)

Singles from .MP3
- 1. "Jagger" Released: 30 March 2023; 2. "No Se Ve" Released: 3 May 2023; 3. "Guerrero" Released: 15 June 2023; 4. "GTA" Released: 7 September 2023; 5. "La Original" Released: 2 November 2023; 6. "Exclusive" Released: 23 December 2023; 7. "Jet Set" Released: 11 January 2024

.MP3 is the second studio album by Argentine singer-songwriter Emilia, released on 3 November 2023, through Sony Music Latin and WK Records. It has been supported by seven singles: "Jagger", "No Se Ve" (with Ludmilla), "Guerrero", "GTA", "La Original" (with Tini), "Exclusive" and "Jet Set" (with Nathy Peluso).

== Composition ==
.MP3 is a 2000s-influenced album that combines styles of pop, R&B, dance-pop, hip-hop and urban music. Emilia co-wrote it and worked with producers including Big One, Mauricio Rengifo, Andrés Torres, Valyum, and Zecca.

=== Musical style ===
The concept of .MP3 revolves around a revival of the female-driven pop of the 1990s but predominantly the 2000s era, the music that Emilia listened to while growing up. As such, she has mentioned U.S. pop stars such as Beyoncé, Rihanna, Missy Elliott, Gwen Stefani and Pink as some of her biggest inspirations, as well as Latin American singers like Shakira, Thalía and Paulina Rubio. Musically, the album sees Emilia distance herself from her signature pop-reggaetón sound of her debut, in favor of experimentation with other genres such as hip-hop and various electronic styles that were popular in the 2000s, such as house music. Interviewed by NME, Emilia explained the album's concept:

When I was young, the artists who inspired me were always women. It was the only music I listened to. The lyrics made me feel very, very powerful. I thought to myself, "I want to do something like that with my music." Bandana were a very popular girl group in Argentina when I was growing up [in the early 2000s]. I really love that era of music, I think it's the golden era of music and very important for me today. (...) Right now I'm doing music inspired by the 2000s, but different genres from that period. I try to weave my identity into the songs, but keep them familiar to that 2000s sound. I'm so excited because it's something new for me.

As part of the album's theme of 2000s nostalgia, the title of each of its tracks is written with ".mp3" at the end, emulating how music files were saved in portable music players. When asked by Wonderland magazine about the intention behind this, Emilia explained: "When I was young, I had an MP3 player, and I remember all the songs finish with that. It puts in context to be people about that era. There is something meaningful about that era. I want to put people who listen to my music in that era, because the music that I make right now is inspired by then. There are kids who hear me that don't know about mp3, and I want to show them that there is more than digital. I think there's something iconic about that time, and mp3 represents something important to it."

=== Songs ===
"GTA"
A departure from Emilia's previous output, the fourth single "GTA" features an electronic, house music sound heavily influenced by Kylie Minogue.

The album's second track and lead single, "Jagger" has been described as a 2000s-inspired dance-pop and urban pop song, with elements of hip-hop. Writers have noted similarities between the song's style and hits by Ciara and Missy Elliott in that decade. Billboard described "Jagger" as a "steamy song that plays with different tempos" that is "sprinkled with some English but written mostly in Spanish". Emilia sings: "Lo que tengo de buena lo tengo de mala / I'm a bad bitch, 'toy volando sin alas". The song's lyrics depict Emilia embracing self-empowerment while declaring her imperviousness to detractors.

In "La Original", Emilia and Tini sing over a piano house beat about "fully embracing themselves behind the scenes once the cameras turn off". In a press release, Emilia explained the meaning behind the song: "I always try to show all parts of myself, but I feel like with all the criticism we sometimes face, we hide and don't want to show our true selves. 'La Original' is about that. (...) Tini and I decided to do the opposite and show that it's okay to portarse mal when there's no one there to judge or point fingers."

"GTA" is a club-oriented track with an electronic-house sound that sets it apart from Emilia's previous releases. Interviewed by NME, the singer described it as "an electronic song, heavily inspired by Kylie Minogue. I just love her." In another interview, she stated that "GTA" was "very important to me because it's a very different song for me. People will never hear me like that, so I'm excited for the next steps." Wonderland defined the song as an "immersive and groove-laden track that is designed to get listeners on their feat, rhythmically and stylistically unique". Over pulsating beats, Emilia sings about a "hot-and-heavy romance that she can't get out of her head", and "giving a private show to the man she likes".

"No Se Ve" is a "genre-bending" song that combines funk carioca with EDM.

== Promotion and release ==
Shortly after her performance at Billboard Mujeres Latinas en la Música, Emilia announced her international 2023 Tour, which began on 14 May in Mexico City as part of the Tecate Emblema festival. While in Mexico, Emilia was interviewed for E! News Latino and Radio Disney México.

On 9 October 2023, Emilia posted a video in her Instagram account teasing the album's release, which shows her in a bedroom that resembles that of a teenager in the 2000s, with walls full of posters, synthetic hair rugs and other typical objects of the time. Three days later, the singer revealed the album's official title and artwork in her Instagram and Twitter accounts. Following the album's overall concept of 2000s nostalgia, the cover shows a CD case with a picture of the singer leaning on an MP3 player. On 17 October, Emilia unveiled a new website promoting the new release. Following the concept of the album, the website has a style reminiscent of vintage social networks such as Fotolog or Myspace. Emilia published a second teaser on 20 October, which shows her in the same setting as the previous clip but going through VHS cases stacked next to a television; each of the cases features the title of one of the album's tracks, and when she introduces one of the tapes to the television the screen reveals that the album's release date will be 2 November. Two days later, the singer announced the complete tracklist and released the option to presave the album. On 29 October, Emilia celebrated her birthday at a big party in Puerto Madero, Buenos Aires with the theme of the album and its reference to the 2000s, in addition to revealing on her social media accounts that the tracks "Iconic" and "La Original" would feature Nathy Peluso and Tini, respectively.

The album was released for digital download and streaming on 3 November by Sony Music Latin and WK Records. The song "Jet Set" remains hidden and is set for release in 2024. That day, Emilia performed the songs "GTA" and "No Se Ve" at the 2023 Los 40 Music Awards held at the WiZink Center in Madrid, where she received the Best Latin Collaboration award for the latter.

=== Tour ===
On 30 November 2023, Emilia announced that she would embark on the .MP3 Tour in 2024 and tickets went on sale on 4 December. That day, she sold out ten shows at Buenos Aires's Movistar Arena in less than ten hours.

Tour dates
Date	City	Country	Venue
South America
6 April 2024	Buenos Aires	Argentina	Movistar Arena
7 April 2024	Buenos Aires	Argentina	Movistar Arena
12 April 2024	Rosario	Argentina	Ex-rural
19 April 2024	Buenos Aires	Argentina	Movistar Arena
20 April 2024	Buenos Aires	Argentina	Movistar Arena
21 April 2024	Buenos Aires	Argentina	Movistar Arena
23 April 2024	Buenos Aires	Argentina	Movistar Arena
27 April 2024	Córdoba	Argentina	Quality Arena
28 April 2024	Córdoba	Argentina	Quality Arena
26 May 2024	Buenos Aires	Argentina	Movistar Arena
29 May 2024	Buenos Aires	Argentina	Movistar Arena
30 May 2024	Buenos Aires	Argentina	Movistar Arena
31 May 2024	Buenos Aires	Argentina	Movistar Arena
Europe
22 June 2024	A Coruña	Spain	Coliseum da Coruña
28 June 2024 (Note: The concert of 28 June 2024 is part of the Sunsetland Festival.)	Murcia	Spain	Cuartel de Artillería
30 June 2024	Granada	Spain	Plaza de Toros
4 July 2024 (Note: The concert of 4 July 2024 is part of the Starlite Festival.)	Marbella	Spain	Cantera de Nagüeles
6 July 2024	Madrid	Spain	WiZink Center
10 July 2024 (Note: The concert of 10 July 2024 is part of the Concert Music Festival.)	Chiclana	Spain	Auditorio Poblado de Sancti Petri
14 July 2024	Barcelona	Spain	Palau Sant Jordi
18 July 2024	Valencia	Spain	City of Arts and Sciences
North America
9 August 2023	Mexico City	Mexico	Teatro Metropólitan
10 August 2023	Mexico City	Mexico	Teatro Metropólitan
14 August 2023	Querétaro	Mexico	Teatro Metropolitano
16 August 2023	Guadalajara	Mexico	Teatro Diana
17 August 2023 (Note: The concert of 17 August 2024 is part of the Dale Mixx Festival.)	Monterrey	Mexico	Fundidora Park
22 August 2023	Mérida	Mexico	Auditorio La Isla
24 August 2023	León	Mexico	Foro del Lago
South America
7 September 2024	Asunción	Paraguay	Yacht y Golf Club Paraguayo
11 September 2024	Mendoza	Argentina	Aconcagua Arena
12 October 2024	Buenos Aires	Argentina	José Amalfitani Stadium
13 October 2024	Buenos Aires	Argentina	José Amalfitani Stadium
18 October 2024	Buenos Aires	Argentina	José Amalfitani Stadium
19 October 2024	Buenos Aires	Argentina	José Amalfitani Stadium
24 November 2024	Santiago	Chile	Movistar Arena
25 November 2024	Santiago	Chile	Movistar Arena
26 November 2024	Santiago	Chile	Movistar Arena
7 December 2024	Montevideo	Uruguay	Antel Arena
8 December 2024	Montevideo	Uruguay	Antel Arena
14 December 2024	Salta	Argentina	Estadio Delmi

==== Cancelled and rescheduled shows ====
List of cancelled or rescheduled dates
Date	City	Country	Venue	Outcome	Reason
12 April 2024	Rosario	Argentina	Anfiteatro Municipal	Moved to Ex-Rural	High demand
4 May 2024	Montevideo	Uruguay	Antel Arena	Moved to 7 December 2024	Medical prescription
5 May 2024	Montevideo	Uruguay	Antel Arena	Moved to 8 December 2024	Medical prescription
6 May 2024	Buenos Aires	Argentina	Movistar Arena	Moved to 26 May 2024	Medical prescription
10 May 2024	Salta	Argentina	Estadio Delmi	Moved to 14 December 2024	Medical prescription
18 May 2024	Mendoza	Argentina	Aconcagua Arena	Moved to 11 September 2024	Medical prescription
25 May 2024	Asunción	Paraguay	SND Arena	Moved to 7 September 2024 at Yacht y Golf Club Paraguayo	Medical prescription
12 July 2024	Algeciras	Spain	Plaza de Toros	Cancelled	Unknown

=== Singles ===
The album's lead single, "Jagger", was released on 30 March 2023. It entered the Billboard Argentina Hot 100 on 8 April and peaked at number 5 on 29 April, remaining on the chart for 28 weeks. In the Argentine Chamber of Phonograms and Videograms Producers (CAPIF)'s Top 10 ranking of the most listened to songs in the country, the single peaked at number 8 in the week of 14 April. The song also entered Monitor Latino's Argentina Top 20 chart on 23 April, peaking at number 11. In Uruguay, "Jagger" peaked at number 15 in Monitor Latino's chart, and reached number 16 at CUD's chart for the month of May. The single's accompanying music video was directed by Ballve and has been noted for its reference to 2000s fashion, with the singer wearing bandanas, large-size earrings and sunglasses, and low-rise jeans. It shows Emilia washing a car and doing a group choreography in the garden of a typical North American house.

"No Se Ve"—in collaboration with Ludmilla— was released as the album's second single on 3 May 2023, through WK Records. The song performed better commercially than its predecessor. It entered the Billboard Argentina Hot 100 on 15 May and peaked at number 5 on 22 July, currently remaining on the list for 23 weeks. In the CAPIF's Top 10 ranking of the most listened to songs in the country, "No Se Ve" peaked at number 4 in the week of 30 June, while also peaking at number 9 in Monitor Latino's chart for Argentina. On 17 July, Monitor Latino published a unique feature discussing the song's "unstoppable" commercial performance in the country, stating that its success is "not only limited to the Monitor Latino charts but has also generated a great impact on the Argentine music industry. The song has achieved platinum certifications and has become one of the most requested on the most important radio stations in the country."

The album's second single also achieved commercial success outside Argentina. It appeared on Billboard's Latin Pop Airplay chart at number 17 and Global Excl. US chart at number 158. "No Se Ve" ranked in several of Monitor Latino's country charts, including Uruguay at number 15, Chile at number 5, and Ecuador at the top spot. In Uruguay, the song also reached number 7 at CUD's chart for July. In Spain, it peaked at number 13 in PROMUSICAE single's chart and at number 12 in Billboard's Spain Songs chart. The song also performed well in Brazil, where it appeared in three of Crowley's charts for the country: Top 100 Brasil at number 77, Top 10 Latino at the top spot, and Top 10 Pop Internacional at number 6. "No Se Ve" was certified Gold in Brazil by Pro-Música Brasil, quintuple Platinum in Spain by PROMUSICAE, and Latin Gold in the U.S. by the RIAA.

The accompanying music video for "No Se Ve" was also directed by Ballve and had the particularity of being released in two versions, one of them in vertical format intended for Instagram Reels and made in collaboration with Meta, which became the first music video ever to debut on the social media platform on 3 May. The clip accumulated 40 million views in the first 24 hours of its premiere, marking a new record for Emilia and Ludmilla. The full-length version was published on YouTube on 5 May and is shot in horizontal format, but with a 4:3 aspect ratio, typical of television from the 1990s and 2000s, The music video shows Emilia in a typical room of a girl from the 2000s, with walls full of posters and featuring flip phones and teen magazines of the time. In one of the magazines she looks through, she sees Ludmilla, a famous pop star, and magically transports herself to where she is. In line with the overall theme of the album, the video "brings many of the Y2K trends, including neon, lace-up tops, rose-colored sunglasses, and more."

"Guerrero" was released as the album's third single on 15 June 2023. A few days before the release of the song—which was close to Father's Day in Argentina—Emilia published photos and messages dedicated to her father, to whom the song is dedicated. The single had a poorer commercial performance than its predecessors. It entered the Billboard Argentina Hot 100 at number 88 on 24 June but left the chart the following week. The music video for the song, directed by Rocío Gastaldi, shows the singer traveling in time to her childhood home to accompany her father in his illness, but also herself as a child.

"GTA" was released as the album's fourth single on 7 September 2023. Its music video was once again directed by Ballve and depicts the singer alternating between playing a GTA-inspired video game and being a character within the same game as an erotic dancer. The release of the single and its music video was controversial to some Twitter users, who accused her of advocating prostitution. In this regard, her partner Duki defended her in a tweet—which he later deleted—in which he argued that the lyrics were not nearly as explicit as other hits of the moment, and that the music video represents a video game and not real life. "GTA" has been a commercial success in Argentina, peaking at number 2 in the Billboard Argentina Hot 100 chart and number 5 in CAPIF's chart. In Spain, the song topped Los 40's weekly chart on 26 August and months later on 28 October.

"La Original" with Tini was released immediately before the album as its fifth single on 2 November 2023. Directed by Ballve, the music video "walking onto a runway while watched by fashion critics before they start singing the lyrics to their catchy track as they sport headpiece mics reminiscent of Britney Spears' best performances." The video then shows the two singing and dancing on the empty runway after everyone has left.

== Accolades ==
Awards and nominations for .MP3
Year	Organization	Category	Result	Ref.
2024	Latin Grammy Awards	Best Pop Vocal Album	Nominated	
2024	Premios Juventud	Best Pop/Urban Album	Nominated	

== Track listing ==
.MP3 track listing
No.	Title	Writer(s)	Producer(s)	Length
1.	"Facts"	María Emilia Mernes; Esteban Leiva; Mauro Lombardo; Francisco Zecca	Zecca; Valyum	2:10
2.	"Jagger"	Mernes; Lombardo; Zecca	Zecca	2:35
3.	"Jet Set" (with Nathy Peluso)	Mernes; Lombardo; Nathy Peluso	Zecca; Big One	2:25
4.	"Iconic"	Mernes; Mauricio Rengifo; Andrés Torres	Torres; Rengifo	3:01
5.	"La Original" (with Tini)	Mernes; Lombardo; Rengifo; Martina Stoessel; Torres	Torres; Rengifo	2:20
6.	"GTA"	Mernes; Lombardo; Rengifo; Torres	Torres; Rengifo; Zecca	2:31
7.	"Exclusive"	Mernes; Lombardo	Big One	2:00
8.	"No Se Ve" (with Ludmilla)	Mernes; Lombardo; Ludmilla Oliveira da Silva; Zecca	Zecca	3:23
9.	"24 Hs"	Mernes; Leiva; Lombardo; Zecca	Zecca; Valyum	2:23
10.	"Muñecos"	Mernes; Lombardo; Enzo Sauthier	Zecca	2:45
11.	"Ojitos Verdes"	Mernes; Lombardo; Andrea Elena Mangiamarchi; Sauthier	Big One	2:51
12.	"A 1000 Km"	Mernes; Lombardo; Sauthier	Big One	3:20
13.	"Guerrero"	Mernes; Lombardo; Zecca	Zecca	3:58
Total length:				35:50

Notes

- All tracks are stylized with an underscore between words and ".mp3" at the end.
- "Jet Set" is stylised as "JET Set"
- "Iconic" is stylised as "IConic"

== Personnel ==
- Emilia Mernes – vocals
- Zecca – mastering, mixing, engineering (tracks 1–3, 8–10, 13)
- Andrés Torres – mastering, engineering (tracks 4–6)
- Mauricio Rengifo – mastering, engineering (tracks 4–6)
- Tom Norris – mixing (tracks 4–6)
- Daniel Ismael Real – mastering, mixing, engineering (tracks 7, 11, 12)

== Charts ==
Weekly chart performance for .MP3
Chart (2023–2024)	Peak position
Argentine Albums (CAPIF)	1
Spanish Albums (Promusicae)	9

=== Year-end charts ===
2024 year-end chart performance for .MP3
Chart (2024)	Position
Spanish Albums (PROMUSICAE)	39

== Certifications ==
Certifications for .MP3
Region	Certification	Certified units/sales
Spain (Promusicae)	Gold	20,000^{‡}
^{‡} Sales+streaming figures based on certification alone.
