= Tú Crees en Mí? =

2022 studio album by Emilia

Studio album by Emilia
- Released: 31 May 2022
- Recorded: 2021–2022
- Genre: Latin pop; Latin trap; Latin R&B; urban
- Length: 22:37
- Language: Spanish
- Label: Sony Latin
- Producer: Big One

Emilia chronology
Tú Crees en Mí? (2022)	.MP3 (2023)

Singles from Tú Crees en Mí?
- 1. "Como Si No Importara" Released: 13 July 2021; 2. "Rápido Lento" Released: 30 September 2021; 3. "Cuatro Veinte" Released: 24 March 2022; 4. "Intoxicao" Released: 30 May 2022

Tú Crees en Mí? (English: Do You Believe in Me?) is the debut studio album by Argentine singer-songwriter Emilia. It was released through Sony Music Latin on 31 May 2022. It is a Latin pop album with influences of Latin R&B and urban music. All the songs were written by Emilia and Daniel Ismael Real, with support from musicians Duki and Elena Rose, among others. It features guest vocals by Duki, Nicki Nicole, and Tiago PZK.

The release of four singles preceded the album. "Como Si No Importara", the lead single, was well received commercially, peaking at number three on the Billboard Argentina Hot 100, and reaching the top 20 in Paraguay and Uruguay. It was Emilia's first song to chart on the Billboard Global Excl. US. "Rápido Lento" and "Cuatro Veinte", the second and third single, respectively, reached the top 5 in Argentina and Uruguay. The last single, "Intoxicao", was released one day before the album. For the promotion, Emilia embarked on the Tú Crees en Mí? Tour in 2022.

== Background ==
After performing a show at Lollapalooza Argentina, Emilia gave an interview to Filo News where she assured that her debut album was about to be released and that it would include some collaborations.

== Concept and title ==
The title arose from the catchphrase of the first single from the album "Como Si No Importara" and was later used in the following songs. According to Emilia, Tú Crees en Mí? references a song by Reik that inspired her, "Creo en ti", which has a special background for her. On the other hand, she affirmed that she had chosen the title because of the confidence she had since she was a girl until she made the decision to sing and enter the music industry. Likewise, the phrase is dedicated to the people and fans who trusted her since the beginning of her career.

=== Cover artwork ===
On 23 May 2022, the cover artwork was posted via Emilia's social media, along with the official release date for the album.

== Composition ==
=== Music and lyrics ===
Musically, Tú Crees en Mí? is an eclectic mix of pop, ballad and urban, which contains elements of Latin R&B, Latin trap and afrobeat. All the songs were written by Emilia with contributions from Duki, Elena Rose and Daniel Ismael Real (Big One), who also produced all the songs. The album's lyrics address themes such as empowerment, love, overcoming breakups, sensuality and enjoyment.

=== Songs ===
Tú Crees en Mí? opens with the track "Latin Girl", a pop song about Latin women. Emilia also mentions that pop divas inspire the song including Christina Aguilera, Beyoncé, Rihanna, Avril Lavigne, and P!nk. The song has verses in English and Spanish and was written by Mernes and Real with the collaboration of Lombardo. The album continues with "Como Si No Importara", an urban pop collaboration with Duki with influences from reggaeton and Latin trap that talks about a secret and passionate love story. The song was written by both artists along with Real. The third track is "Cuatro Veinte", which was written by Mernes, Real and Sauthier, and talks about the woman and her enjoyment. The song belongs to the reggaeton genre and has references and inspirations from the 2000s genre. This same musical trend is maintained with the next song, "Intoxicao", a collaboration with Nicki Nicole. However, it has Latin trap and hip-hop influences, written by Mernes and Nicole, Real and Sauthier, and, according to the artist, talks about the ups and downs of a relationship and its toxicity.

The album continues with "Mi Otra Mitad", written by Mernes and Andrea Elena Mangiamarchi, and tells a true story about a past relationship of Emilia, who did not feel mutual love but a half love on the part of her couple. The song belongs to the R&B genre. Later, "La Balada" begins, a pop ballad song that Mernes and Mangiamarchi wrote, and according to the artist, talks about a personal toxic relationship where she was able to bring out all the anguish she experienced the side of overcoming. The album continues with "Rápido Lento" a collaboration with Tiago PZK, a relaxed R&B song fused with nuances of hip-hop and alternative rock, in which the sexual tensions between a couple are described. The song was written by both artists with the collaboration of Real and Lombardo. Finally, the album closes with "Cielo en la Mente", of the urban pop genre, written by Mernes with the support of Real, Sauthier and Lombardo. The song talks about following her heart to continue in music, and, according to the artist, it is dedicated to herself as a teenager.

== Promotion ==
=== Singles ===
The first single published was "Como Si No Importara" performed along with Duki. Its respective music video, directed by Martin Seipel, was released simultaneously with the song on 13 July 2021. "Como Si No Importara" reached number three on the Billboard Argentina Hot 100, and charted as well as in different markets of other countries such as Spain, Paraguay and Uruguay. In mid-2022, the music video received a nomination for Video of the Year at the 2022 Premios Tu Música Urbano.

On 30 September 2021, Emilia confirmed through her social networks the release of the song "Rápido Lento" with Tiago PZK. The music video was filmed in Miami under the direction of Facundo Ballve. It was also released that day. The song received good reviews, highlighting "their musical maturity and their growth as performers."

On 24 March 2022, Emilia released "Cuatro Veinte" as the third single from the album, simultaneously with its music video. The song was moderately successful, reaching second position on the official weekly charts in Argentina and fifth in Uruguay. Likewise, it received certifications in both countries for its sales.

"Intoxicao" with Nicki Nicole was released as the fourth single, and the same had been confirmed through their social networks, with the release scheduled one day before the publication of the album.

=== Tour and live performances ===
On 24 February 2022, Emilia and Duki performed their song "Como Si No Importara" for the first time at the Premios Lo Nuestro. On 7 June 2022, Emilia announced through her social networks the tour of the album, which is titled Tú Crees en Mí? Tour and the first statement included twelve dates for different festivals in Spain, the United States, and Mexico.

== Track listing ==
All songs produced by Big One.

Tú Crees en Mí? track listing
No.	Title	Writer(s)	Length
1.	"Latin Girl"	Daniel Ismael Real; María Emilia Mernes; Mauro Ezequiel Lombardo	2:46
2.	"Como Si No Importara" (with Duki)	Real; Enzo Ezequiel Sauthier; Mernes; Lombardo	2:53
3.	"Cuatro Veinte"	Real; Sauthier; Mernes	2:13
4.	"Intoxicao" (with Nicki Nicole)	Real; Sauthier; Mernes; Nicole Denise Cucco	2:48
5.	"Mi Otra Mitad"	Andrea Elena Mangiamarchi; Mernes	2:46
6.	"La Balada"	Mangiamarchi; Mernes	2:45
7.	"Rápido Lento" (with Tiago PZK)	Real; Sauthier; Mernes; Lombardo; Tiago Uriel Pacheco Lezcano	3:33
8.	"Cielo en la Mente"	Real; Sauthier; Mernes; Lombardo	2:49
Total length:			22:37

Notes

- All tracks are stylized in all lowercase.

== Charts ==
Chart performance for Tú Crees en Mí?
Chart (2022)	Peak position
Spanish Albums (PROMUSICAE)	49

== Certifications ==
Region	Certification	Certified units/sales
Argentina (CAPIF)	Platinum	20,000^{^}
^{^} Shipments figures based on certification alone.
