= Emilia Mernes =

Argentine singer (born 1996)

Emilia
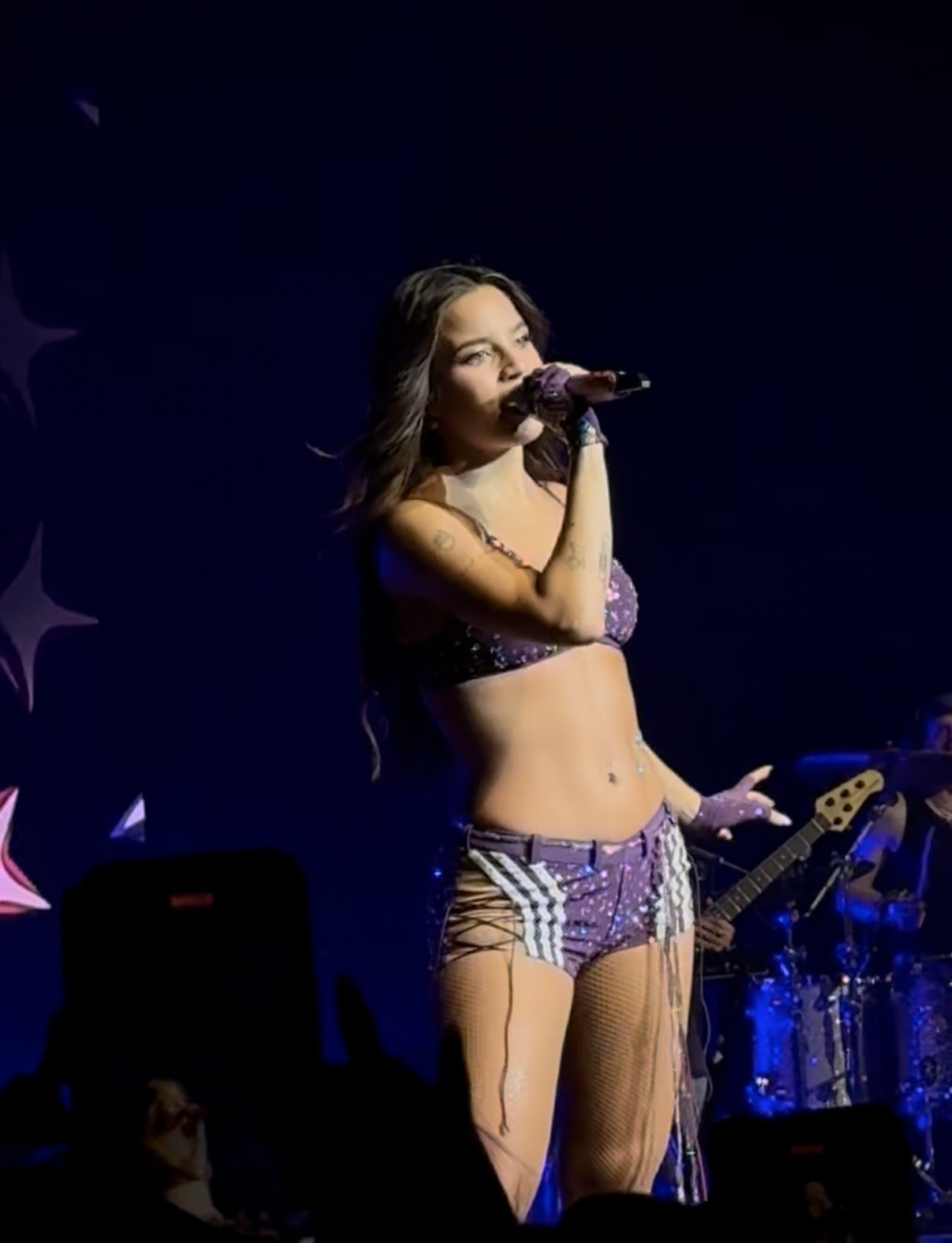
- Mernes performing in 2025

Background information
- Born: María Emilia Mernes; 29 October 1996 (age 29); Nogoyá, Entre Ríos, Argentina
- Genres: Urban pop; reggaeton; Latin R&B
- Occupations: Singer; songwriter; model; actress
- Instrument: Vocals
- Works: Discography
- Years active: 2016–present
- Label: Sony Latin
- Formerly of: Rombai
- Website: emiliaoficial.com

María Emilia Mernes (born 29 October 1996), known mononymously as Emilia, is an Argentine singer. She began her career as the lead vocalist of the Uruguayan cumbia pop band Rombai. Two years after joining, Mernes began to focus on her solo career.

After signing with the label Sony Music Latin and management company WK Entertainment, Mernes found commercial success. She released her pop and urban debut studio album Tú Crees en Mí?, certified Platinum by the CAPIF. In 2023, Emilia earned her first number-one singles on the Argentina Hot 100 with "En la Intimidad", along with Big One and Callejero Fino, and "Los del Espacio", as part of the supergroup of the same name. In the same year, she released her 2000s-influenced album .MP3, which reached number two in Argentina and contained her third chart-topper "La Original", a collaboration with Tini.

Mernes' accolades include two Premios Gardel, a Premio Odeón, and a MTV MIAW Award, as well as nominations for the Latin Grammy Awards, Heat Latin Music Awards, Premios Juventud, Los 40 Music Awards, and the Premios Tu Música Urbano, among others.

== Early life ==
Born and raised in Nogoyá, Entre Ríos, Emilia's devotion to music began when she was just 12 years old and her grandfather gave her a guitar. Since then, creating melodies, strumming her guitar, singing, and dancing have become her passions. She comes from a close-knit family, and her parents have always been supportive of her musical journey. She completed her secondary studies at the Colegio del Huerto in her hometown.

In 2016, she began studying Literature at the National University of Rosario. Six months later, she realized she wanted to study music and dropped out of her studies. So she went home and asked her parents if she could study music at National University of Rosario. However, she never made it to her first class. In her free time, she began rehearsing songs. She recorded and uploaded her first cover to her Instagram account.

== Career ==
=== 2016–2020: Career beginnings ===
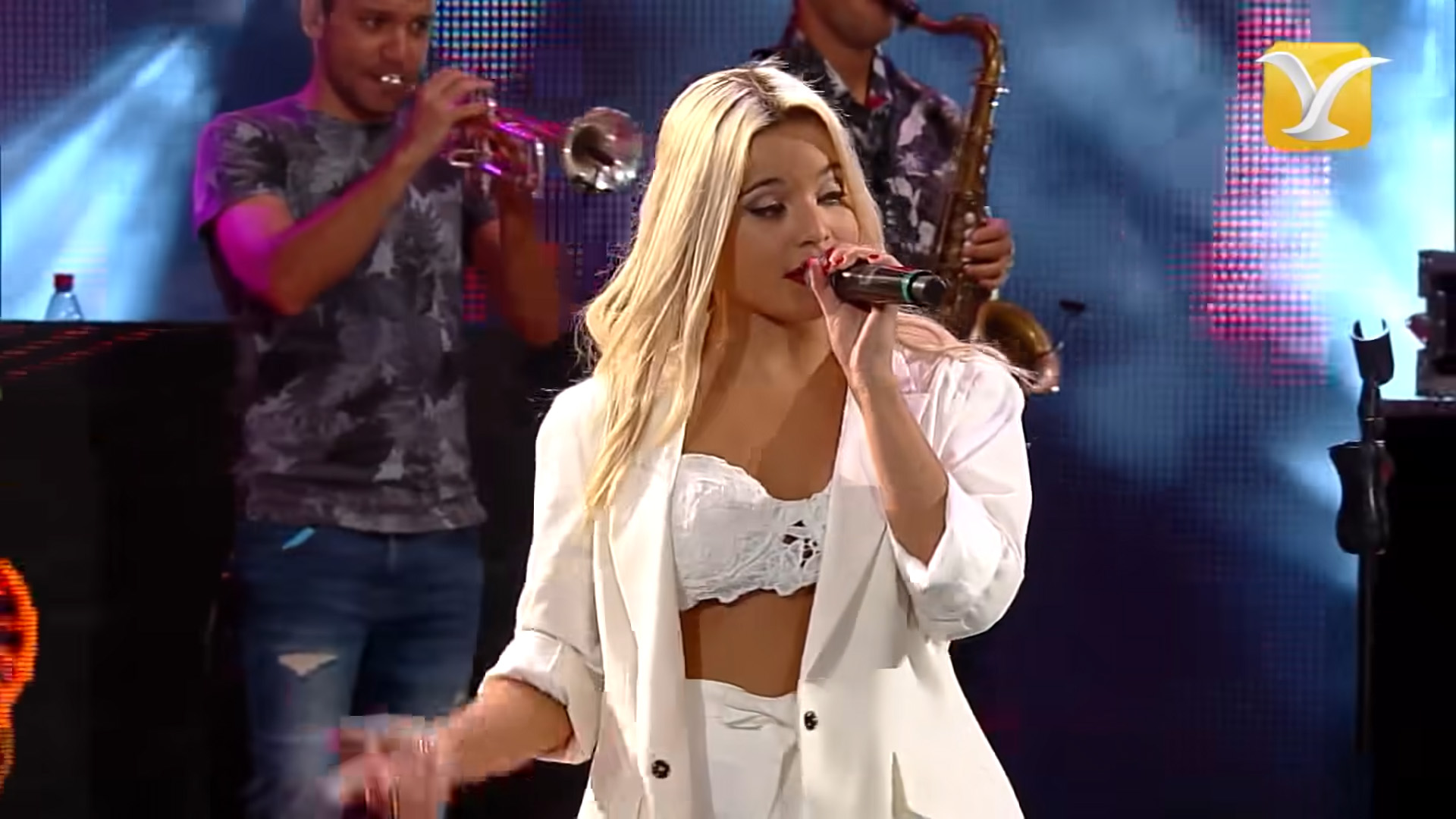
Mernes performing in 2017 with Rombai.

She rose to fame in 2016 as the singer of the Uruguayan band Rombai. She replaced Rombai's former vocalist, Camila Rajchman. Within a week, she was already doing her first show at the Estadio Luna Park. From 2016 to 2018, the group performed on some of the most important stages of Latin America. As the band's primary vocalist, together with Fer Vázquez, they released the singles "Cuando se Pone A Bailar", "Sentí el Sabor", "Una y Otra Vez", Besarte," and "Que Rico Baila". In 2018, Emilia announced her departure from the group to focus on her solo career.

In 2019, after signing a contract with WK Entertainment and Sony Music Latin, home of superstars acts such as Maluma, Wisin, CNCO, Carlos Vives and Prince Royce, Emilia released her debut single "Recalienta", which peaked at number 68 on the Billboard Argentina Hot 100. In May 2019, she collaborated with Ana Mena and Nio García for the song "El Chisme". In August 2019, she released along with Darell the single "No Soy Yo", whose video is starring Joel Pimentel from CNCO, Oriana Sabatini and Johann Vera. The song also peaked in the top 70 in Argentina and was her first to chart on the Billboard Latin Pop Airplay chart, at position 38. The following month, she performed singing this single at the Latin American Music Awards. On 28 November 2019, was released the song "Boomshakalaka", in which she is featured, with Dimitri Vegas & Like Mike, Afro Bros, Sebastián Yatra and Camilo. In late 2019, Emilia released her fourth single as a lead artist, "Billion".

On 30 January 2020, she released the single "Policía" alongside its music video. In March 2020, she collaborated with the MYA duo for the song "Histeriqueo". She also released along with Vevo the promotional single "No Más", a song first presented in February via Vevo DSCVR, which managed to become the only video clip within the platform to exceed 1 million views, 2 million views and 3 million views in 2020 (Only 9 songs have managed to exceed 3 million views in all history in Vevo DSCVR) regardless of language or genre, in a short period of time. On 14 August, Mernes released a remix of the song, titled "Já É Tarde (No Más)", with the Brazilian singer Bianca and producer Cabrera. On 15 October, she released "Bendición" along with Puerto Rican singer Álex Rose, with a home video clip recorded as a result of the COVID-19 pandemic. The song reached number one on the Monitor Latino chart in several countries in Central America, Chile, Bolivia, and Paraguay. In November, she joined FMK and Estani on the song "Esta Noche", with production of Big One.

=== 2021–2022: Tú Crees en Mí? ===
The lead single of her first studio album, "Como Si No Importara", with Argentine rapper Duki, was released on 13 July 2021. The song was her first to reach the top ten in Argentina, peaking at number three, and her first to chart on the Billboard Global Excl. US, at number 126. The song was certified multiple Platinum by the Argentine Chamber of Phonograms and Videograms Producers and the Cámara Uruguaya de Productores de Fonogramas y Videogramas, and Gold (Latin) by the Recording Industry Association of America. In September, she released "Rápido Lento" along with Argentine rapper Tiago PZK. The song peaked at number two in Argentina. Between November and December, Mernes released the standalone singles "BB", her second collaboration with MYA, and "De Enero a Diciembre", with Rusherking. Both songs reached the top ten in Argentina.

The album's third single, "Cuatro Veinte", was released alongside its music video on 24 March 2022. Mernes announced her debut studio album, Tú Crees en Mí? on 23 May, along with its cover artwork, its tracklist and the official release date, 31 May. The last single, "Intoxicao", with Nicki Nicole, was released one day before the release of the album. Tú Crees en Mí? was certified Platinum by the CAPIF and reached the top 50 in Spain. At the end of 2022, Emilia released the top 40 standalone singles "La Chain" and "Underground". In the year, she also was featured in five singles: "Esto Recién Empieza", with rapper Duki, "Diva", with Princess Nokia, "Q-Lito", with Sael, "Quieres", with Aitana and Ptazeta, and "El Plan", with Rusherking and L-Gante.

=== 2023–present: .MP3 ===
Mernes began 2023 by releasing the song "En la Intimidad" on 1 February, along with Big One and Callejero Fino. The song, which musically mixes reggaeton, pop, RKT and argentine cumbia, is the first in a series of songs by Big One titled "Crossover". "En la Intimidad" reached number one on the Billboard Argentina Hot 100 and stayed there for seven weeks. It also reached the top 20 in Bolivia, Paraguay and Uruguay, and was her first song to enter the Billboard Global 200 chart. In the same month, Emilia participated in two other songs: the remixed version of "Uno los Dos" by Miranda!, and "Tu Recuerdo" with Wisin and Lyanno.

Between March and May, Mernes began by releasing previews of her second studio album, which will have characteristic elements of the 2000s. On 30 March, she released "Jagger", a dance pop song with elements of urban pop and hip hop. On 3 May, she released, in collaboration with Ludmilla, "No Se Ve", a funk carioca song. Both songs managed to reach the top ten in Argentina. On 1 June, the song "Los del Espacio" was released, by the supergroup of the same name in which Mernes participates along with Lit Killah, Tiago PZK, María Becerra, Duki, Rusherking, Big One and FMK. The collab topped the Billboard Argentina Hot 100 Chart. On 15 June, Mernes released "Guerrero", the third single of her album, a ballad tribute to her father. The following month, her collaboration with FMK titled "Salgo a Bailar" was released, an Argentine cumbia and reggaeton song with lyrics about a story of separation and difficulties in getting over someone. On 7 September, was released "GTA" as the fourth single from her second studio album. The song peaked at number two in Argentina, becoming her first solo single to reach the top spot, joining "Cuatro Veinte" as her highest peak on the Billboard Argentina Hot 100. On 23 May, she released the song "Perdonarte, ¿Para Qué?" in collaboration with the Mexican band Los Ángeles Azules.

Emilia's single "La Playlist" was released on 20 June 2024. It follows the 2000s aesthetic of her previous album, as it is stylized as "La_Playlist.mpeg". In August 2024, she collaborated with Tiago PZK and Anitta for the song "Alegría" and with Ana Mena for the song "Carita Triste". On 23 October 2024, she collaborated with Lit Killah for the song Emilia also released a new single "Novio Gangsta" she dedicated to her former boyfriend Duki It was released on 14 October 2024."Novio Gangsta" has reached number 4 on the "Billboard" Argentina Hot 100. On top of that she collaborated with Khea new single called "Tú y Yo" The song was released on 14 February 2024. Also, she performed for the first time at this year's 25th Latin Grammys which took place on Thursday, 14 November 2024. Emilia recently announced her new singing role in the new film "Moana 2."

== Personal life ==
Emilia started dating Uruguayan singer Fer Vázquez in 2016 after being part of the band Rombai. Then in 2018 they ended their relationship. In 2021, she announced her relationship with Argentine rapper Duki via Instagram.

== Filmography ==
Year	Title	Role	Notes
2021	La Voz: El Regreso	Herself	Coach, web reality show
2021	La Voz Argentina 3	Herself	Coach, episode 46
2021	Entrelazados	Sofía Lasso	Main cast (season 1)

== Discography ==
- Tú Crees en Mí? (2022)
- .MP3 (2023)

== Tours ==
Headlining

- Tú Crees en Mí? Tour (2022)
- 2023 Tour (2023)
- .MP3 Tour (2024)
- Emilia Tour 2025 (2025)

Opening act

- Sebastián Yatra – Yatra Yatra Tour (2019)

== Awards and nominations ==
List of awards and nominations received by Emilia
Award	Year	Recipient	Category	Result	Ref.
Heat Latin Music Awards	2021	Herself	Best Promising Act	Nominated	
Heat Latin Music Awards	2022	Herself	Best Female Artist	Nominated	
Heat Latin Music Awards	2022	Herself	Best Artist - Southern Region	Nominated	
Heat Latin Music Awards	2023	Herself	Best Female Artist	Nominated	
Heat Latin Music Awards	2023	Herself	Best Artist - Southern Region	Nominated	
Heat Latin Music Awards	2024	Herself	Best Artist South Region	Nominated	
Heat Latin Music Awards	2024	"Los del Espacio" (with Lit Killah, Tiago PZK, María Becerra, Duki, Rusherking, Big One, and FMK)	Best Collaboration	Nominated	
Latin Grammy Awards	2024	.MP3	Best Pop Vocal Album	Nominated	
Latin Music Italian Awards	2019	Herself	Best New Artist - Latin	Nominated	
Los 40 Music Awards	2022	Herself	Best New Act	Nominated	
Lo Nuestro Awards	2021	Herself	Female New Artist	Nominated	
Lo Nuestro Awards	2022	Herself	Female Artist - Urban	Nominated	
Lo Nuestro Awards	2024	Herself	Female Pop Artist of the Year	Nominated	
Lo Nuestro Awards	2024	"No Se Ve" (with Ludmilla and Zecca)	Urban/Pop Song of the Year	Nominated	
Lo Nuestro Awards	2024	"Tu Recuerdo" (with Wisin and Lyanno)	Urban/Pop Collaboration of the Year	Nominated	
MTV Europe Music Awards	2024	Herself	Best Latin America South Act	Nominated	
MTV MIAW Awards	2022	Herself	Argentine Artist	Nominated	
MTV MIAW Awards	2023	Herself	Celebrity Crush	Nominated	
MTV MIAW Awards	2023	Herself and Duki	Couple Goals	Nominated	
MTV MIAW Awards	2023	"Los del Espacio" (with Lit Killah, Tiago PZK, María Becerra, Duki, Rusherking, Big One, and FMK)	Collaboration of the Year	Won	
MTV MIAW Awards	2024	Herself	Pop Explosion	Nominated	
MTV MIAW Awards	2024	Herself	Crack Artist	Nominated	
MTV MIAW Awards	2024	Herself	"La Patrona" of the Year	Nominated	
Premios Buenos Aires Music Video Fest	2020	"Billion"	Favorite Video	Nominated	
Premios Buenos Aires Music Video Fest	2020	"Histeriqueo" (with MYA)	Favorite Video	Won	
Premios Buenos Aires Music Video Fest	2020	"Policía"	Vertical Video	Nominated	
Premios Gardel	2023	Tú Crees en Mí?	Best Pop Album	Nominated	
Premios Gardel	2024	.MP3	Album of the Year	Nominated	
Premios Gardel	2024	.MP3	Best Urban Pop Album	Won	
Premios Gardel	2024	"La Original" (with Tini)	Song of the Year	Nominated	
Premios Gardel	2024	"Los del Espacio" (with Lit Killah, Tiago PZK, María Becerra, Duki, Rusherking, Big One, and FMK)	Song of the Year	Nominated	
Premios Gardel	2024	"Los del Espacio" (with Lit Killah, Tiago PZK, María Becerra, Duki, Rusherking, Big One, and FMK)	Best Urban Song	Nominated	
Premios Gardel	2024	"Los del Espacio" (with Lit Killah, Tiago PZK, María Becerra, Duki, Rusherking, Big One, and FMK)	Best Urban Collaboration	Won	
Premios Gardel	2024	"Los del Espacio" (with Lit Killah, Tiago PZK, María Becerra, Duki, Rusherking, Big One, and FMK)	Record of the Year	Nominated	
Premios Gardel	2024	"La Original" (with Tini)	Record of the Year	Nominated	
Premios Gardel	2024	"La Original" (with Tini)	Collaboration of the Year	Nominated	
Premios Gardel	2024	"La Original" (with Tini)	Best Urban Pop Song	Nominated	
Premios Gardel	2024	"La Original" (with Tini)	Best Music Video	Nominated	
Premios Gardel	2024	"En la Intimidad" (with Big One & Callejero Fino)	Best Urban Song	Nominated	
Premios Juventud	2020	Herself	Best Female New Artist	Nominated	
Premios Juventud	2022	Herself	Female Artist – On The Rise	Nominated	
Premios Juventud	2022	"Esto Recién Empieza" (with Duki)	Best Song by a Couple	Nominated	
Premios Juventud	2022	Herself and Duki	Best Social Media Power Couple	Nominated	
Premios Juventud	2022	Herself	Trendiest Artist	Nominated	
Premios Juventud	2023	Herself	Female Artist – On The Rise	Nominated	
Premios Juventud	2023	"Intoxicao" (with Nicki Nicole)	Girl Power	Nominated	
Premios Juventud	2023	"Tu Recuerdo" (with Wisin and Lyanno)	Best Pop/Urban Collaboration	Nominated	
Premios Juventud	2023	Tú Crees en Mí?	Best Pop/Urban Album	Nominated	
Premios Juventud	2023	Herself	My Favorite Trendsetter	Nominated	
Premios Juventud	2024	"La Original" (with Tini)	Girl Power	Nominated	
Premios Juventud	2024	"La Original" (with Tini)	Favorite Dance Track	Nominated	
Premios Juventud	2024	.MP3	Best Pop/Urban Album	Nominated	
Premios Odeón	2024	Herself	Best Latin New Artist	Won	
Premios Tu Música Urbano	2020	Herself	Female Revelation	Nominated	
Premios Tu Música Urbano	2022	Herself	Female New Artist	Nominated	
Premios Tu Música Urbano	2022	"Como Si No Importara" (with Duki)	Video Of The Year	Nominated	
Premios Tu Música Urbano	2023	Herself	Top Female Rising Star	Nominated	
Premios Tu Música Urbano	2023	Tú Crees en Mí?	Album Of The Year - Rising Star	Nominated	
WME Awards	2023	"No Se Ve" (with Ludmilla and Zecca)	Latin American Song	Nominated	
WME Awards	2025	"Bunda" (with Luísa Sonza)	Latin American Song	Pending	
WME Awards	2025	"Perfectas"	Latin American Song	Pending	

== See also ==
- List of singer-songwriters
