= Cámara Uruguaya de Productores de Fonogramas y Videogramas =

Uruguayan music industry association

- Abbreviation: CUD
- Formation: 1960
- Legal status: Association
- Purpose: Defense of the interests of the production of phonograms
- Headquarters: Montevideo
- Location: Uruguay
- Executive director: Mauricio Ubal
- Affiliations: IFPI
- Website: cudisco.org

Cámara Uruguaya de Productores de Fonogramas y Videogramas (English: Uruguayan Chamber of Phonograms and Videograms Producers), also known as Cámara Uruguaya del Disco (CUD) (English: Uruguayan Record Chamber), is a Uruguayan non-profit organization, established in 1960. Since 2005, it has administered the economic rights of the Uruguayan Phonographic Producers, the latter a member of the International Federation of the Phonographic Industry (IFPI).

== Services ==
Like other certifying bodies, the CUD combats piracy in the Uruguayan music industry. In 2008, the Uruguayan authorities approved law number 18,341 promoted by this company and supported by the Executive Power, which eliminates the Value-added tax (VAT) from CDs and DVDs that contain musical and film productions, starting to be marketed in that country without the percentage of 22% added. The objective of the norm was to promote the growth of the recording sector and achieve a reduction in the price of copies of albums for the public.

CUD is also the national International Standard Recording Code (ISRC) agency.

== Sales certificates ==
The CUD awards certificates for music releases in Uruguay. Certificates are usually awarded on the basis of the number of units the release has shipped, rather than the number it has sold.

Format	Thresholds			
Format	Gold	Platinum	2× Platinum	Notes
Album	2,000	4,000	8,000	Since 2007
Album	3,000	6,000	12,000	Until 2006
