= List of radio stations in Uruguay =

This is a list of radio stations in Uruguay.

== Artigas ==
  - 89.5 - Viva FM 89.5 (CX208D) – Artigas –
  - 90.7 – Amatista FM (CX214) – Artigas
  - 94.7 – Aquarius FM – Artigas (closed)
  - 1180 AM - 6075 SW - La Voz de Artigas – Artigas

== Canelones ==
- AM
  - 1570 - Radio Canelones - Canelones
  - 1470- Radio Cristal, Las piedras
  - 1600 - Continental - Pando
- FM
  - 88.3 - Lacosta FM - Barra de Carrasco
  - 89.3 - Del Molino FM - Pando
  - 89.9 - Atlántida FM - Atlántida
  - 89.7 - Viví FM - La Paz
  - 90.1 - FM Ideal – Santa Lucia
  - 90.5 - Santa Rosa FM - Santa Rosa
  - 91.3 - FM San Ramón - San Ramón
  - 91.5 - Señal ZOE - San José de Carrasco
  - 92.3 - Oro FM - El Pinar
  - 93.1 - Inolvidable FM – Las Piedras
  - 100.7 - UNO - Tala
  - 102.9 - Emisora Total - La Paz
  - 104.9 - Metrópolis FM - La Paz
  - 107.3 - Radioluz - Canelones

== Cerro Largo ==
- AM
  - 1520 – Radio Acuarela – Melo
  - 1470 – Radio María – Melo
  - 1340 – La Voz de Melo – Melo
- FM
  - 99.1 – Ciudad de Melo FM (La 99 FM) – Melo
  - 98.3 - Nova FM - Melo
  - 88.1 - Ritmo FM - Melo
  - 101.5 - Integración FM - Aceguá
  - 90.3 - Aceguá FM - Aceguá
  - 105.5 - La Galena FM - Río Branco
  - 89.5 - Sirio FM - Fraile Muerto

== Colonia ==
- AM
  - 550 – Radio Colonia – Colonia
  - 1590 - Radio Real de San Carlos - Colonia
- FM
  - 90.7 – Reflejos FM – Nueva Helvecia
  - 91.9 – Amanecer FM – Colonia

== Florida ==
AM

1200 kc - CW 33 Radio Florida

- FM
  - 90.9 – La Noventa FM – Florida
  - 92.3 - FM Libertador - Florida

== Lavalleja ==
- FM
  - 99.1 – Federal FM – Minas (pop, news)

== Maldonado ==
- AM
  - 1210 - Radio RBC – Piriápolis
- FM
  - 88.7 - Milenium Punta - Punta del Este
  - 89.5 - Global FM - Maldonado
  - 90.9 - Radio Liceo N°1 - San Carlos
  - 91.5 - Brava FM - Maldonado
  - 92.5 - FM Cielo - Pan de Azúcar
  - 93.5 - Azul en el Este - Punta del Este
  - 95.1 - Concierto Punta - Maldonado
  - 96.7 - Viva FM – San Carlos
  - 97.5 - Radio Nuevo Tiempo - Punta del Este
  - 98.9 - Bohemia FM - Punta del Este
  - 100.9 - Babel - Maldonado
  - 101.5 - Radio Cero Punta - Punta del Este
  - 102.5 - M24 Maldonado - Maldonado
  - 103.5 - Aspen FM – Punta del Este
  - 106.5 - Cadena del Mar - Maldonado
  - 107.1 - FM Gente - Maldonado

== Montevideo ==
- AM
  - 580 – Clarín (CX58) – Montevideo (music)
  - 610 – Radio Rural (CX4) – Montevideo (news/folklore)
  - 650 – SODRE (CX6) – Montevideo (classical)
  - 690 – Radio Sarandi (CX8) – Montevideo (news/talk)
  - 730 – Continente (CX10) - Montevideo
  - 770 – Radio Oriental (CX12) – Montevideo (news/sports/religious)
  - 810 – El Espectador (CX14) – Montevideo (news/talk)
  - 850 – Radio Carve (CX16) – Montevideo (news/talk/sports)
  - 890 – Sport 890 (CX18) – Montevideo (sports)
  - 930 – Radio Monte Carlo (CX20) – Montevideo (news/information)
  - 970 – Universal (CX22) – Montevideo (variety/soccer)
  - 1010 – Radio 1010 AM (CX24) – Montevideo (sports)
  - 1050 – Radio Uruguay (CX26) – Montevideo (news/variety/public)
  - 1090 – Radio María (CX28) – Montevideo (religious)
  - 1130 – Radio Nacional La 30 (CX30) – Montevideo (news/information)
  - 1170 – Radiomundo (CX32) – Montevideo (information/variety)
  - 1250 – Radio Centenario (CX36) – Montevideo (information)
  - 1290 – Emisora del Sur (CX38) – Montevideo (music/variety/public)
  - 1330 – Radio Fénix (CX40) – Montevideo (variety)
  - 1370 – Ciudad de Montevideo (CX42) – Montevideo (variety)
  - 1410 – AM Libre (CX44) – Montevideo (news/information/variety)
  - 1450 – Radio América (CX46) – Montevideo (religious/variety)
- FM
  - 90.3 – FM Hit – Montevideo
  - 91.1 – Radio Futura FM – Montevideo
  - 91.9 – Radio Disney – Montevideo
  - 92.5 – Urbana - Montevideo
  - 93.9 – Océano FM – Montevideo
  - 94.7 – Emisora del Sur – Montevideo
  - 95.5 – Del Plata FM – Montevideo
  - 96.3 – Alfa FM – Montevideo
  - 97.1 – Babel FM – Montevideo
  - 97.9 – M24 – Montevideo
  - 98.7 – Diamante FM – Montevideo
  - 99.5 – FM del Sol – Montevideo
  - 100.3 – Aire FM – Montevideo
  - 101.9 – Azul FM – Montevideo
  - 103.7 – FM Latina – Montevideo
  - 104.3 – Radio Cero – Montevideo
  - 105.3 – FM del Carmen – Montevideo
  - 105.9 – Galaxia FM – Montevideo
  - 106.7 – La Ley 106.7 – Montevideo

== Paysandu ==
- FM
  - 96.3 – Casino FM – Paysandu
  - 106.9 – Contacto FM (CX295B) – Paysandu( CHR-pop)

== Rivera ==
- AM
  - 1480 – Radio Internacional (CW43B) – Rivera

== Rocha ==
- AM
  - 1260 – Difusora Rochense – Rocha
  - 1590 – CW 159 – Lascano
- FM
  - 91.3 – La Marea – Rocha
  - 94.9 - Acuario - Rocha
  - 98.3 – Cadena dela Costa|rep. – Rocha
  - 99.9 – Imaginacion 99.9 – Rocha
  - 102.1 – Cadena dela Costa – La Paloma
  - 106.3 - Onda Marina - La Paloma

== Salto ==
- AM
  - 560 - Radio Turística - Salto
  - 740 - Radio Tabaré - Salto
  - 1020 - Radio Libertadores - Salto
  - 1120 - Radio Salto
  - 1410 - Radio 1410 - Salto
  - 1450 – Radio Arapey – Salto
- FM
  - 88.3 - Del Lago FM - Salto
  - 101.5 - Siglo XXI 101.5 - Salto
  - 103.3 - America 103.3 – Salto

== San Jose ==
- FM
  - 99.1 – Café Noticias – San Jose de Mayo
  - 103.3 – Encuentro 103.3 – San Jose de Mayo
  - 107.9- Principal FM (cx300) - San Jose de Mayo

== Tacuarembó ==
- FM
  - 92.5 25 kW Armonia FM (CX223) – Tacuarembó
  - 104.5 25 kW Radio Gaucha (CX283) – Tacuarembó
  - 101.7 25 kW

== Treinta y Tres ==
- FM
  - 97.3 – FM Conquistador – Treinta y Tres
