= 2018 FIFA World Cup broadcasting rights =

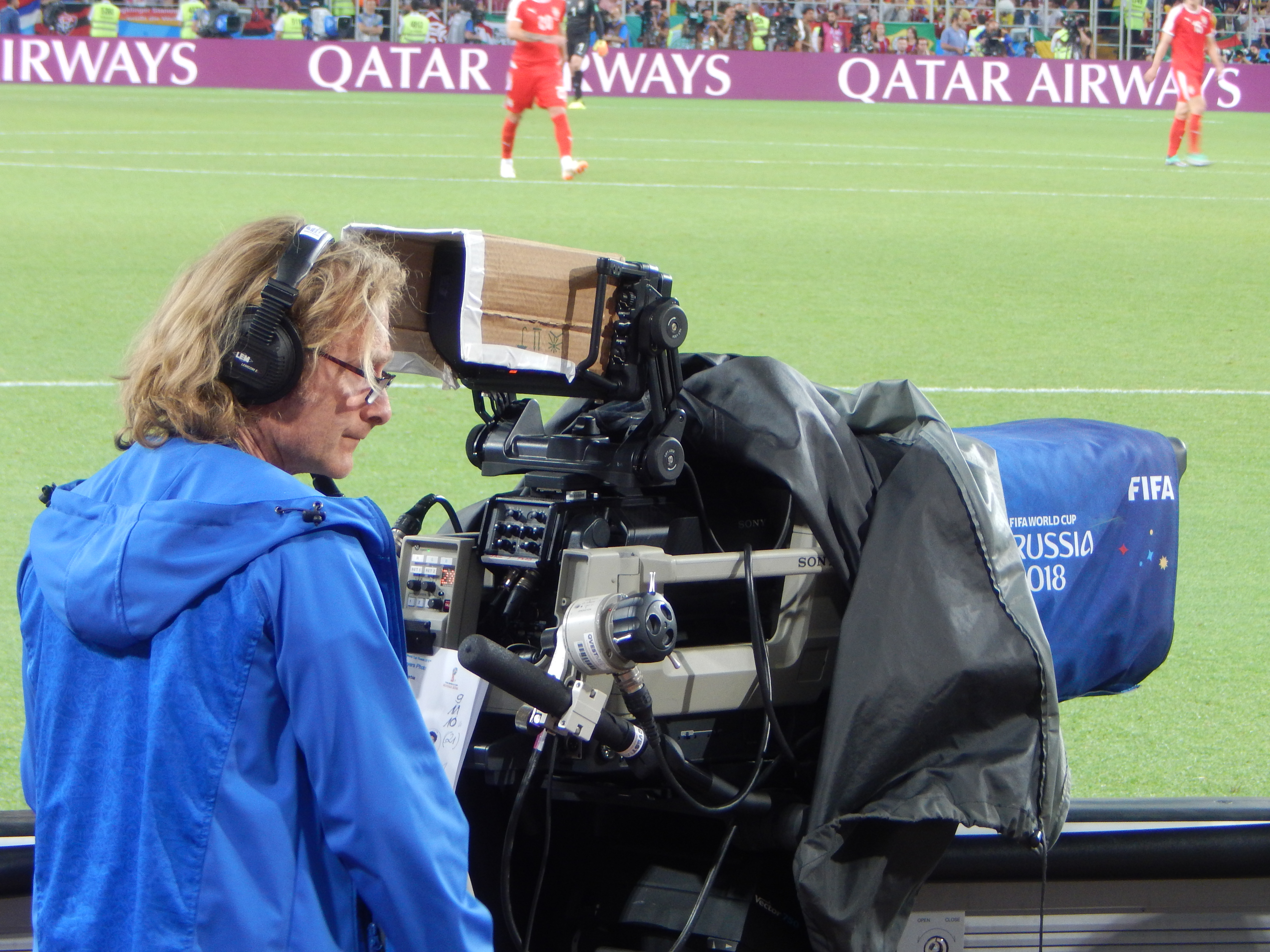
A television camera filming Serbia v Brazil in Group E.

FIFA, through several companies, sold the broadcasting rights for the 2018 FIFA World Cup to the following broadcasters.

== Television ==
Country/Region	Broadcaster	Ref.
Afghanistan	ATN	
Albania	RTSH	
Andorra	TF1, Mediaset España, beIN Sports	
Angola	TPA, Kwesé Sports, SuperSport, StarTimes, Canal+	
Argentina	TV Pública, TyC Sports, DirecTV Sports	
Armenia	ARMTV	
Australia	SBS, Optus Sport	
Austria	ORF, OE24, DAZN	
Azerbaijan	İTV, Idman TV	
Bangladesh	BTV, Maasranga TV, Nagorik TV, Sony Pictures Networks	
Bahamas	ZNS, DirecTV Sports	
Belarus	BTRC	
Belgium	VRT, RTBF	
Benin	ORTB, Kwesé Sports, SuperSport, StarTimes, Canal+	
Bermuda	BBC, DirecTV Sports	
Bhutan	Sony Pictures Networks	
Bolivia	Unitel, BTV, Red UNO, Tigo Sports, DirecTV Sports	
Bosnia and Herzegovina	BHRT	
Brazil	Globo, SporTV, Fox Sports	
Brunei	Astro	
Bulgaria	BNT	
Burkina Faso	RTB, Kwesé Sports, SuperSport, StarTimes, Canal+	
Cambodia	CBS	
Cameroon	CRTV, Kwesé Sports, SuperSport, StarTimes, Canal+	
Canada	CTV, TSN, RDS	
Chad	ORTNV, Kwesé Sports, SuperSport, StarTimes, Canal+	
Chile	Canal 13, TVN, Mega, DirecTV Sports, Movistar	
China	CCTV, Migu, Youku	
Colombia	Caracol TV, RCN TV, DirecTV Sports	
Congo	Télé Congo, Kwesé Sports, SuperSport, StarTimes, Canal+	
Costa Rica	Teletica, Sky, Movistar	
Côte d'Ivoire	RTI, Kwesé Sports, SuperSport, StarTimes, Canal+	
Croatia	HRT	
Cuba	ICRT	
Cyprus	CyBC	
Czech Republic	ČT	
Denmark	DR, TV 2	
Dominica	Sky, DirecTV Sports	
Dominican Republic	Antena 7, Sky	
Ecuador	RTS, DirecTV	
El Salvador	TCS, Sky	
Estonia	ERR	
Faroe Islands	DR, TV 2	
Finland	Yle	
France	TF1, beIN Sports	
Gabon	RTG, Kwesé Sports, SuperSport, StarTimes, Canal+	
Gambia	GRTS, Kwesé Sports, SuperSport, StarTimes, Canal+	
Germany	ARD, ZDF, Sky Sport, DAZN	
Georgia	GPB	
Ghana	GBC, Kwesé Sports, SuperSport, StarTimes, Canal+	
Greece	ERT	
Greenland	DR, TV 2	
Guatemala	TV Azteca, Tigo Sports, Sky, Movistar	
Guinea	RTG, Kwesé Sports, SuperSport, StarTimes, Canal+	
Honduras	TVC, Sky, Movistar	
Hong Kong	ViuTV, Now TV	
Hungary	MTVA	
Iceland	RÚV	
India	Jio TV, AirTel TV, Sony Pictures Networks	
Indonesia	Trans Media, K-Vision, Telkom Indonesia, MNC Vision	
Iran	IRIB	
Ireland	RTÉ	
Israel	KAN, Keshet 12, Sport 5, Charlton	
Italy	Mediaset	
Jamaica	TVJ, DirecTV Sports	
Japan	NHK, NTV, TV Asahi, TBS, Fuji TV, TV Tokyo (Japan Consortium)	
Kazakhstan	Qazaqstan	
Kenya	NTV, Kwesé Sports, SuperSport, StarTimes, Canal+	
Kosovo	RTK	
Kyrgyzstan	KTRK	
Laos	TVLAO	
Latvia	LTV	
Lebanon	Télé Liban, beIN Sports	
Liechtenstein	SRG SSR	
Lithuania	LRT	
Luxembourg	VRT, RTBF	
Macau	TDM	
Madagascar	ORTM, Kwesé Sports, SuperSport, StarTimes, Canal+	
Malaysia	RTM (terrestrial), Astro	
Maldives	PSM, Sony Pictures Networks	
Mali	Africable, Kwesé Sports, SuperSport, StarTimes, Canal+	
Malta	PBS	
Mauritius	MBC, Kwesé Sports, SuperSport, StarTimes, Canal+	
Mexico	Televisa, TV Azteca, Sky México	
Moldova	TRM	
Monaco	TF1, France Télévisions, beIN Sports	
Mongolia	NTV, MNB	
Montenegro	RTCG	
Morocco	SNRT, beIN Sports	
Mozambique	TVM, TV Miramar, TV Sucesso, Kwesé Sports, SuperSport, StarTimes, Canal+	
Myanmar	Skynet Sports	
Namibia	NBC, Kwesé Sports, SuperSport, StarTimes, Canal+	
Nepal	NTV, Kantipur TV, Sony Pictures Networks	
Netherlands	NOS	
New Zealand	Sky Sport	
Nicaragua	Ratensa, Sky, Movistar	
Niger	ORTN, Kwesé Sports, SuperSport, StarTimes, Canal+	
Nigeria	NTA, Kwesé Sports, SuperSport, StarTimes, Canal+	
North Korea	KCTV	
Norway	NRK, TV 2	
Pakistan	PTV, Sony Pictures Networks	
Panama	Corporación Medcom, Televisora Nacional, Sky, Movistar	
Papua New Guinea	EM TV, Sky Pacific	
Paraguay	SNT, Telefuturo, Tigo Sports, Movistar Sports, Caacupé Cable Visión, DirecTV Sports	
Peru	Latina, DirecTV Sports	
Philippines	ABS-CBN	
Poland	TVP, NC+	
Portugal	RTP, SIC, SportTV	
Romania	TVR	
Rwanda	RBA, Kwesé Sports, SuperSport, StarTimes, Canal+	
Russia	Perviy Kanal, VGTRK, Match TV	
San Marino	Mediaset	
Senegal	RTS, Kwesé Sports, SuperSport, StarTimes, Canal+	
Serbia	RTS	
Seychelles	SBC, Kwesé Sports, SuperSport, StarTimes, Canal+	
Singapore	Mediacorp, Singtel, StarHub	
Slovakia	RTVS	
Slovenia	RTVSLO	
Solomon Islands	Our Telekom, Sky Pacific	
South Africa	SABC, SuperSport, StarTimes	
South Korea	KBS, MBC, SBS	
Spain	Mediaset España	
Sri Lanka	Sri Lanka Rupavahini Corporation, Sony Pictures Networks	
Suriname	SCCN, DirecTV Sports	
Sweden	SVT, TV4	
Switzerland	SRG SSR, DAZN	
Taiwan	ELTA, CTS	
Tajikistan	Varzish TV	
Tanzania	TBC, Kwesé Sports, SuperSport, StarTimes, Canal+	
Thailand	TrueVisions, Channel 5, Amarin TV	
Timor Leste	ETO Telco	
Togo	TVT, Kwesé Sports, SuperSport, StarTimes, Canal+	
Trinidad & Tobago	CNC3, DirecTV Sports	
Tunisia	ERTT, beIN Sports	
Turkey	TRT	
Uganda	BBS, Kwesé Sports, SuperSport, StarTimes, Canal+	
Ukraine	Inter, NTN	
United Kingdom Home Nations/Territories: Channel Islands; England; Isle of Man; Northern Ireland; Scotland; Wales	BBC, ITV	
United States and territories: American Samoa; Guam; Northern Mariana Islands; Puerto Rico; Baker Island; Howland Island; Jarvis Island; Johnston Atoll; Kingman Reef; Midway Islands; Navassa Island; Palmyra Atoll; Wake Island	Fox Sports, Telemundo	
Uruguay	Monte Carlo, Canal 10, Teledoce, DirecTV	
Uzbekistan	Uzreport TV, Futbol TV	
Vatican City	Mediaset	
Venezuela	Venevisión, TVes, Meridiano Televisión, DirecTV Sports	
Vietnam	VTV, HTV	
Zambia	Muvi TV, Kwesé Sports, SuperSport, StarTimes, Canal+	

Region	Broadcaster	Ref.
Caribbean Countries/Territories: Antigua & Barbuda; Anguilla; Aruba; Barbados; Belize; British Virgin Islands; Cayman Islands; Curaçao; Dominican Republic; Grenada; Guyana; Haiti; Montserrat; St. Lucia; St. Kitts & Nevis; St. Vincent & the Grenadines; Turks and Caicos; U.S. Virgin Islands	DirecTV Sports	
Middle East and North Africa Countries: Algeria; Bahrain; Comoros; Djibouti; Egypt; Iraq; Jordan; Kuwait; Libya; Mauritania; Oman; Palestinian Authority; Qatar; Saudi Arabia; Somalia; South Sudan; Sudan; Syria; United Arab Emirates; Yemen	beIN Sports	
Oceania Countries/Territories: Cook Islands; Fiji; Kiribati; Micronesia; Nauru; Palau; Samoa; Tonga; Tuvalu; Vanuatu	Sky Pacific	
Sub-Saharan Africa Countries: Botswana; Burundi; Cape Verde; Central African Republic; DR Congo; Equatorial Guinea; Eritrea; Ethiopia; Guinea-Bissau; Lesotho; Liberia; Malawi; Sierra Leone; Swaziland; Zimbabwe	Kwesé Sports, SuperSport, StarTimes, Canal+	

== Radio ==
Nation/Territory	Broadcaster	Ref
Albania	RTSH	
Australia	SBS, ABC	
Austria	ORF	
Belarus	BTRC	
Belgium	VRT, RTBF	
Bosnia and Herzegovina	BHRT	
Brazil	Rádio Bandeirantes, Rádio Gaúcha, Rádio Itatiaia, Rádio Jovem Pan, Rádio Verdes Mares, Radio Sagres 730, Sistema Globo de Rádio, Super Rádio Tupi	
Bulgaria	BNR	
Chile	ADN Radio, Radio Bío-Bío, Radio Cooperativa, UCV Radio	
Colombia	Blu Radio, Caracol Radio, RCN Radio	
Costa Rica	Radio Columbia, Radio Monumental, Teletica Radio	
Croatia	HRT	
Cyprus	CyBC	
Denmark	DR	
Ecuador	RTS, La Radio Redonda	
Estonia	ERR	
France	Europe 1, RTL, Radio France, RMC	
Finland	Yle	
Georgia	GPB	
Germany	ARD, RTL Radio, Radio Hamburg, Radio NRW, Hitradio RTL Sachsen, Hitradio FFH, Antenne Bayern, 89.0 RTL	
Guatemala	Emisoras Unidas, La Red Deportes 106.1	
Hong Kong	RTHK	
Iceland	RÚV	
Indonesia	RRI	
Iran	IRIB	
Ireland	RTÉ	
Israel	KAN	
Italy	RAI, Mediaset	
Jamaica	RJR 94 FM	
Kosovo	RTK	
Liechtenstein	SRG SSR	
Lithuania	LT	
Macau	TDM	
Macedonia	MRT	
Moldova	TeleRadio-Moldova	
Monaco	RMC Sport	
Montenegro	RTCG	
Morocco	SNRT, Radio Mars	
Netherlands	NOS	
Norway	NRK	
Paraguay	Caritas 680 AM, La Deportiva 1120 AM, Universo 970 AM, 95.5 FM Rock & Pop	
Peru	RPP	
Portugal	RTP, TSF, Rádio Renascença	
Portuguese-speaking Africa Countries: Cape Verde; Guinea-Bissau; Mozambique; São Tomé and Príncipe	RTP	
Russia	VGTRK	
Serbia	RTS	
Slovenia	RTVSLO	
South Africa	SABC	
South Korea	SBS	
Spain	RTVE, Cadena COPE, Cadena SER, Onda Cero, Radio Marca	
Sub-Saharan Africa Countries: Angola; Benin; Botswana; Burkina Faso; Burundi; Cameroon; Cape Verde; Central African Republic; Chad; Congo; Côte d'Ivoire; DR Congo; Equatorial Guinea; Eritrea; Ethiopia; Gabon; Gambia; Ghana; Guinea; Guinea-Bissau; Kenya; Lesotho; Liberia; Madagascar; Malawi; Mali; Mauritius; Mozambique; Namibia; Niger; Nigeria; Rwanda; São Tomé and Príncipe; Senegal; Seychelles; Sierra Leone; Swaziland; Tanzania; Togo; Uganda; Zambia; Zimbabwe	France Médias Monde	
Sweden	SR	
Switzerland	SRG SSR	
Turkey	TRT	
United Kingdom Home Nations/Territories: England; Scotland; Wales; Northern Ireland; Gibraltar; Channel Islands; Isle of Man	BBC, Talksport	
United States and territories: American Samoa; Guam; Northern Mariana Islands; Puerto Rico; U.S. Virgin Islands; Baker Island; Howland Island; Jarvis Island; Johnston Atoll; Kingman Reef; Midway Islands; Navassa Island; Palmyra Atoll; Wake Island	Fox Sports Radio (simulcast of television audio), Fútbol de Primera	
Uruguay	770 AM Oriental, 810 AM El Espectador, 850 AM Carve, 890 AM Sarandí Sport, 930 AM Monte Carlo, 970 AM Radio Universal, 1090 AM Radio Imparcial, 1410 AM Radio LaCatorce10, 99.5 FM Del Sol	
Vietnam	VOV	
