= SODRE =

Government agency of Uruguay

SODRE — Servicio Oficial de Difusión, Representaciones y Espectáculos
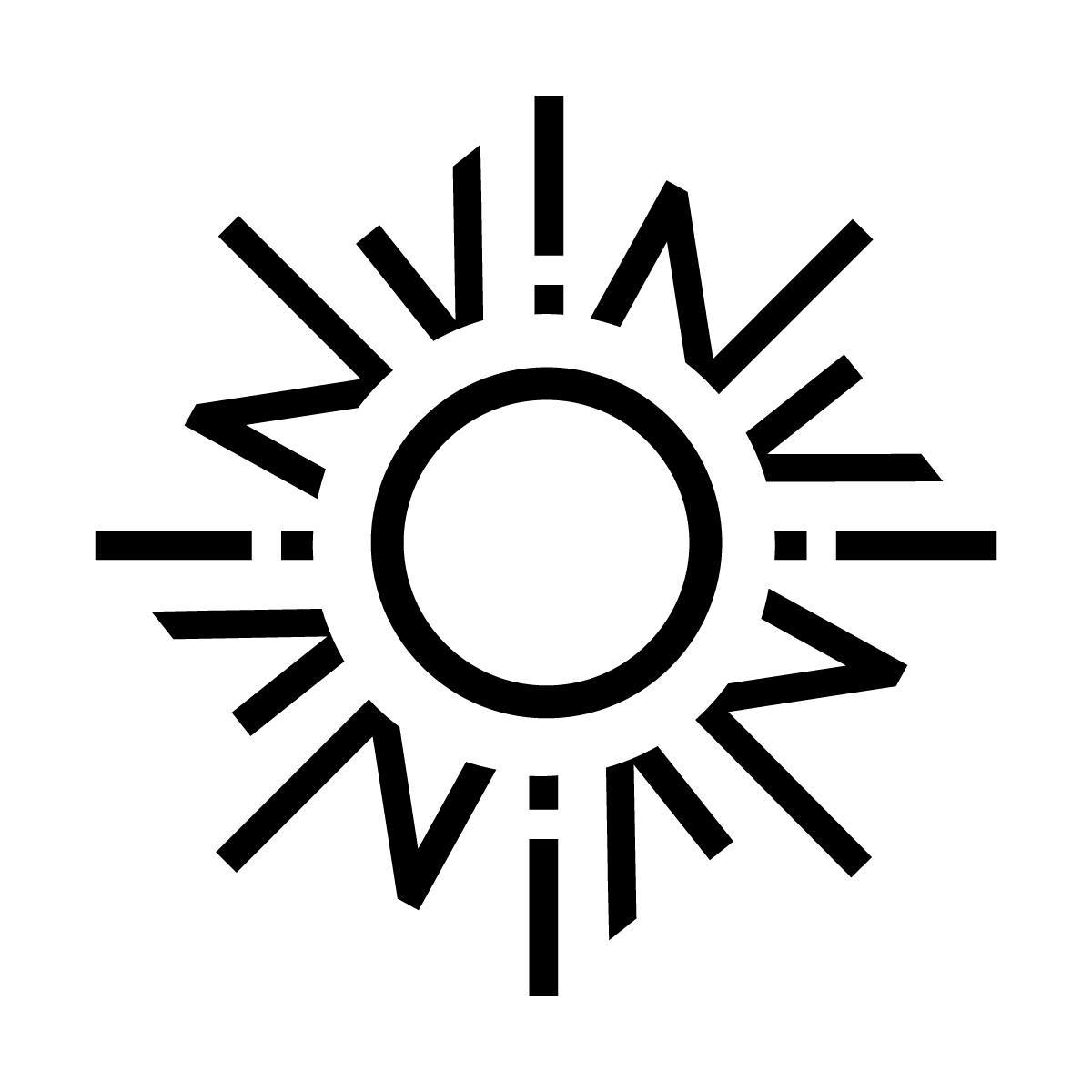

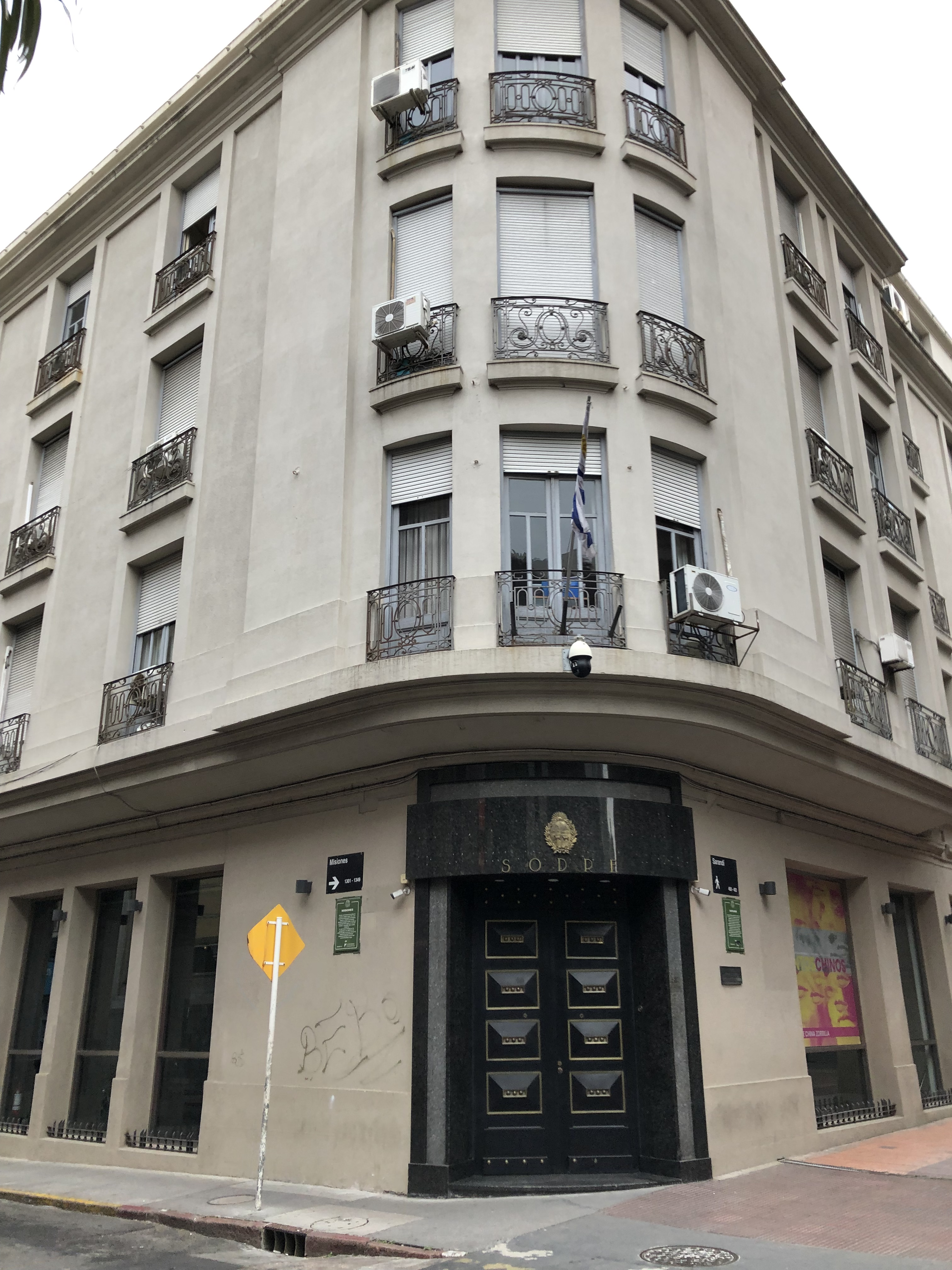
- Headquarters in Montevideo
- Type: state-owned
- Industry: Media
- Genre: Cultural organization
- Founded: 1929
- Founder: Government of Uruguay
- Headquarters: Montevideo, Uruguay
- Owner: Ministry of Education and Culture
- Website: SODRE

The Official Service for Broadcasting, Performances and Entertainment (Spanish: Servicio Oficial de Difusión, Representaciones y Espectáculos; styled Sodre) is a national cultural organization in Uruguay, controlled by the Ministry of Education and Culture.

It was formerly the national broadcaster of Uruguay prior to the separation of Radiodifusión Nacional del Uruguay as a distinct agency in 2015. It is headquartered in 444 Peatonal Sarandí, Ciudad Vieja, Montevideo.

== History ==
The Official Service for Broadcasting, Performances and Entertainment was created as the "Official Radio Electric Broadcasting Service" on December 18, 1929 during the administration of President Juan Campisteguy Oxcoby. The foundation was given after an initiative of the National Council of Administration, which sought to "spiritually improve" the inhabitants of the country, by transmitting artistic, scientific, illustrative shows or auditions. The law that originated it established as the body's competence to "create schools and conservatories", "acquire and lease phonographic, theatrical, cinematographic, printed musical material or any other that is related to its activities", "edit catalogues, programs or other publications", "act individually or in ensembles in the shows or auditions that it performs or that it contributes to perform, as well as in the schools or conservatories that it institutes". The first president of the agency was Francisco Ghigliani.

On April 1, 1930, the official station, CX 6, began its regular transmissions, which had journalistic, cultural, sports, educational and broadcast programming from the agency's troupes. Over time, the agency would acquire other radio stations, such as CX 38 and CX 26, which it managed until 2015.

== Troupes ==
=== Ballet ===
The Sodre Dance Corps was founded in 1935 as the country's national ballet company. The first performance was Nocturno Nativo, with music by Vicente Ascone and choreography by Alberto Pouyanne. It also featured a performance by the Symphony Orchestra, under the direction of Lamberto Baldi.

The company has made national and international tours, having performed in Spain, Italy, Oman, China, Thailand, Russia, Israel, Mexico, Cuba, Venezuela, Colombia, Peru, Chile, Paraguay, Argentina and Brazil.

=== Choir ===
SODRE established the country's first official choir in 1934. Its first conductor was Icilio Nini-Bellucci, and its first performance was Vincenzo Bellini's opera La sonnambula.

==== Children's Choir ====
The National Children's Choir was re-launched in July 2016, and is made up of 120 choir members between the ages of 6 and 15. The group's first concert was held in Solís de Mataojo, Lavalleja Department.

==== Juvenile Choir ====
The Juvenile Choir was a natural continuation of the members of the Children's choir whose voices had evolved and needed a different space to continue their vocal formation. It is currently made up of 80 choir members between the ages of 15 and 21.

=== Symphonic Orchestra ===
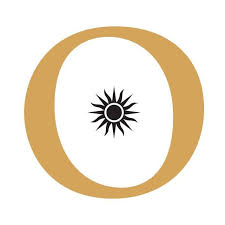
Seal of the SODRE Symphony Orchestra

Created in 1931, the SODRE Symphony Orchestra is the main orchestra in the country.

==== Youth orchestra ====
The Youth Orchestra was launched in 2011, as a result of an alliance between Sodre and the Fundación Sistema de Orquestas Juveniles e Infantiles del Uruguay. Made up of more than 100 young musicians, it performs more than 50 concerts a year and has been awarded the National Award for Citizen Excellence on two occasions by the Latin American Development Center.

It has made different international tours: Panama-United States (2013), —in which it gave a concert in the OAS Hall of the Americas in Washington D.C., in front of diplomatic and political authorities—, Germany-Spain-France (2014), United States-Mexico (2015), Spain-Italy (2017), Cuba-United States (2019).

== Auditoriums ==
=== National Auditorium ===
The National Auditorium was inaugurated in 2009 and is located in Central Montevideo in the same place as the old Urquiza Theater that was destroyed in a fire in 1971. Named after the lawyer, politician and former president of the body Adela Reta, it is the main venue of SODRE.

=== Nelly Goitiño Auditorium ===
The Nelly Goitiño Auditorium is an old movie theater inaugurated in 1949 that served as the Eliseo Cinema for several decades. In the 80s it was acquired by SODRE, and in 2006 it closed its doors to be reconditioned. In 2008 it started operating again, being renamed after the lawyer, actress and theater director Nelly Goitiño. Art Deco in style, it is located in barrio Centro, Montevideo.

=== Vaz Ferreira Auditorium ===
The Vaz Ferreira Auditorium is located in the first basement of the National Library in barrio Cordón, Montevideo.

== See also ==
- CX 6 SODRE
- CX 26 SODRE
- CX 38 SODRE
