= Eduardo J. Corso =

Uruguayan lawyer and writer

- Born: Jesús Eduardo Corso Crispino; 1 September 1920; San Ramón, Canelones Department, Uruguay
- Died: 5 December 2012 (aged 92)
- Occupations: agricultural journalist, lawyer, writer

Jesús Eduardo Corso Crispino, popularly known as Eduardo J. Corso (1 September 1920 – 5 December 2012), was a Uruguayan lawyer, agricultural journalist and writer. Articles he wrote were published in magazines and newspapers such as El País and Marcha, and he was a conservative. According to El País, Corso was known for his "brutal" use of language, which earned him some friends and enemies.

== Biography ==
Corso was born on 1 September 1920 in San Ramón, Canelones Department, Uruguay. He was a supporter of the Civic Union, a small Uruguayan political party. He was the successor of Salvador García Pintos for the "Field Journal" radio station in 1949, and later worked for Radio Rural, Sarandí, Oriental, and El Espectador.

Corso was a mainstay of the agricultural radio sector for over 50 years. Corso was also a journalist: his articles were published in El País, La Mañana, El Diario, Últimas Noticias and Marcha. Corso was a devout Catholic and his Christian faith bore the stamp of clear conservatism. In 2009, Corso had spent a total of sixty years as a radio journalist and he left the radio station he spent the past thirty years with.

According to El País, Corso often used "brutal" language, which earned him friends and enemies. During his career, despite his conservative stance, he never hesitated to express his opinions, which caused some criticism. When democracy returned in 1985, Corso protested against the amnesty granted by Julio María Sanguinetti (which had the backing of most political parties) to the Tupamaros.

He died on 5 December 2012. He is buried at San Ramón Cemetery.

== Family ==
His brother Antonio Corso (1916—1985) was a bishop of Punta del Este.

Married to María Barreto, he had three children: Eduardo, María Cecilia and Ana Rosa.

He had six grandchildren: Magdalena, Lucía, María, Juan, Sofía and Pablo.
