= Jorge Ottati (Junior) =

Uruguayan sports announcer

Jorge Ottati (born in Montevideo, Uruguay) is a television and radio sports announcer who currently works for BeIN Sports. His father is Prof. Jorge Ottati, a renowned sportscaster.

He started his broadcasting career in Uruguay at the young age of 16 in CX 4 Radio Capital. He also worked for several radio stations such as CX 32 Radiomundo, CX 30 Radio Nacional, CX 38 SODRE, CX 36 Radio Centenario, CX 28 Radio Imparcial, and CX 12 Radio Oriental.

In 1996, he started working in television with Canal 10 for the 1996 Summer Olympics, and then he was hired by TVC Network as a host and play-by-play announcer for professional basketball games.

== Broadcasting career in the United States ==
=== PSN - Pan-American Sports Network (Cable Television) – Hollywood, Florida (2000–2002) ===
==== Basketball – play-by-play announcer ====
- NBA
- WNBA
- Liga Sudamericana de Básquetbol

==== Studio host ====
- 2000 Sydney Olympic Games Opening Ceremony
- NBA Preview Show
- Sydney 2000 Daily Show
- El Show de los Goles
- French League Highlights Show
- Italian League Highlights Show
- Mercosur Preview Show
- Libertadores Preview Show
- Pepsi 2001 Mexican Soccer
- Sudamerica Rumbo al Mundial
- The Best of Le Championnat
- Liga Sudamericana Preview Show

==== Soccer – play-by-play announcer ====
- Copa CONMEBOL Libertadores
- CONCACAF Champions Cup
- Italian League
- 2002 World Cup South America Qualifiers (CONMEBOL)
- 2002 World Cup North, Central America and Caribbean Qualifiers (CONCACAF)
- 2002 World Cup Europe Qualifiers
- French League
- Mexican League
- Portuguese League
- English FA Cup
- UEFA Cup
- Dallas Cup
- USA Cup
- Copa Mercosur
- Copa Merconorte
- Sudamericano Sub-20 Ecuador
- Sudamericano Sub-17 Peru
- European Friendly Games

==== Voice-overs ====
- Sportsworld
- FIFA Futbol Mundial
- Trans World Sport
- Wild Spirits
- Legends of Wimbledon

=== Univision, TeleFutura and Galavisión (Broadcast Television) - Miami, Florida (2004–2012) ===
==== Studio anchor and co-host ====
- Contacto Deportivo (TeleFutura)

==== Sports anchor ====
- Copa América Al Día – Perú 2004 (Galavision)
- En Vivo y Directo (TeleFutura)

==== Color commentator and host ====
- Mundial Sub-20 – Holanda 2005 (TeleFutura/Galavision)
- Mundial Sub-17 – Perú 2005 (Galavision)
- Fútbol Liga Mexicana (Galavision/TeleFutura)
- Copa de Oro 2005 (Galavision/TeleFutura)
- Copa Confederaciones – Alemania 2005 (Galavision/TeleFutura)
- Torneo Uncaf – Guatemala 2005 (Galavision)
- Torneo Uncaf – El Salvador 2007 (Galavision)

==== Studio host ====
- Solo boxeo de Miller/Solo Boxeo Tecate
