= CDAGS syndrome =

Rare genetic syndrome

- Specialty: Medical genetics

CDAGS syndrome, also known as CAP syndrome, is a very rare syndrome characterized by craniosynostosis and other cranial defects, delayed closure of the fontanelles, deafness, anal anomalies, genital malformations and skin eruption. CDAGS is caused by heterozygotic compound variants in the RNU12 gene, which disrupts the function of the minor spliceosome. Only 14 cases are known worldwide. It is inherited in an autosomal recessive fashion.

== Signs and symptoms ==
The clinical picture is very complex and there is some degree of variation in presentation amongst the patients.

Most CDAGS patients are born with bicoronal craniosynostosis. Other cranial defects can also be present. At birth the anterior and posterior fontanelles are wide open and will be delayed in their closure. CDAGS is also associated with microcephaly, which is more pronounced in some patients than others.

Almost all patients are born with anal anomalies. Often anus imperforatus or a rectovestibular fistula. In at least one patient no anal anomalies were present at birth.

All patients have skin eruption. With some patients the lesions are described as psoriasiform, however in most patients they are described as porokeratosis-like. The lesions typically consist of hyperkeratotic rings with fragile, damaged skin in the middle. The lesions manifest themselves in a typical symmetrical pattern where the face and extremities are the most affected regions of the skin. In general the lesions are not painful, though patients may feel itching and mild burning.

Male patients are affected by genito-urinary malformations. Hypospadia is a common symptom.

Many patients have hearing loss. Some are completely deaf, others only have partial hearing loss.

Developmental delay is seen in about half of the patients. Often this will already be notable in infancy, where developmental milestones will not be reached in time. Sometimes it will only get noticed at age 5-7 when patients perform below average in school. Normal intelligence has also been reported.

Many patients have no collarbones or they are underdeveloped, which can cause hightened mobility of the shoulders.

Many patients have dental defects like enamel dysplasia.

Cleft palate has been reported in some cases.

Overlapping toes have been described in one patient.

All patients have some form of alopecia. Newborns will typically have alopecia totalis. During infancy the hair on the scalp will set in at a later time than normal, but eventually will typically appear normal. Some patient's scalp hair will remain thin. Eyelashes will be sparse and will typically remain that way. Eyebrows are typically completely absent. Body hair as well will be very sparse or even completely absent.

== Genetics ==
CDAGS is a spliceosomal syndrome. Because of a defect on the minor spliceosome alternative splicing events are seen in 120 genes and gene expression is dysregulated. The expression is most affected in the skin, which explains the skin eruptions. The biological processes impacted most are morphogenesis and forebrain development. This explains the skeletal defects and mental delay seen in some patients.

In 2005, Dr. Mendoza-Londono determined the genetic cause to be located on 22q12-q13. In 2021, Dr. Xing discovered that biallelic variants in RNU12 cause CDAGS syndrome.

== Diagnosis ==
Clinical diagnosis is typically made on the basis of the typical skin eruption pattern in combination with bicoronal craniosynostosis and anal atresia. Sequencing of the RNU12 gene can genetically confirm the diagnosis.

== Treatment ==
The cranial defects, genetourinary malformations and anal anomalies can be surgically corrected and will typically have a good prognosis.

Hearing aids can be prescribed for hearing loss.

There is no real cure for the skin eruption. Treatment mainly consists of the regular application of emmolients. Opportunistic bacterial infections, often by Staphylococcus aureus, can be treated with either topical or systemic antibiotics or a combination of both. Retinoids in combination with corticosteroids are used in some patients. Elinol is used as well. At a later age pulsed dye laser treatment is possible to reduce the scars left by the lesions. As the skin eruption is very difficult to manage, it can have a big impact on the quality of life of the patients.

Mental and motor development need to be monitored after birth, so therapy can start early enough if development is delayed.

== Epidemiology ==
14 cases are known worldwide in 10 families. Based on genetic data it is estimated that CDAGS occurs in about 1 in 40 millions births.

== History ==
The first known patients are a Japanese brother and sister reported in 1981. It was already clear the affliction was hereditary as it affected both siblings. Researchers at the time were wondering if this was a new undiscovered syndrome.

In 1990 an Irish patient was reported. The link with the Japanese cases was not made. When a similarly affected brother was born in 1998 it became clear that they were dealing with a hereditary syndrome. The syndrome was called CAP-syndrome, short for: craniosynostosis, anal anomalies and porokeratosis.

In 2005, Dr. Mendoza-Londono discovered three new American cases in two families. He also connected his cases to the Irish and Japanese cases. Mendoza-Londono updated the name from CAP-syndrome to CDAGS; the abbreviation "CDAGS" summarizes the most prominent features of the disorder: "C" stands for craniosynostosis and clavicular hypoplasia; "D" for delayed closure of the fontanel, cranial defects, and, in some patients, deafness; "A" for anal anomalies, including anterior placement of the anus and imperforate anus; "G" for genitourinary malformations; and "S" for skin eruption.

In 2013 three new patients were reported in two new families: 2 sisters in Lebanon and 1 girl in the United States.

In 2017 the first Mexican case was reported. She is the first -and only- case where overlapping toes have been reported.

In 2020 the first French case was reported: a 7-year-old girl.

In 2021 a new American case was reported: a 2-year-old boy.

In 2022 the first Belgian case was born.
