= Humberto de Vargas =

Uruguayan television presenter, actor and radio broadcaster (born 1962)

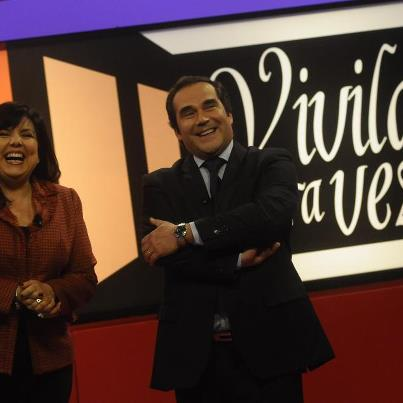
- De Vargas in 2012
- Born: Humberto Gerardo Vitureira Paz; July 31, 1963 (age 62); Montevideo, Uruguay
- Occupations: Television presenter; Radio broadcaster; actor
- Years active: 1978–present
- Spouse: Rosy Alhadeff (m. 1999; div. 2020)
- Children: 3

Humberto Gerardo Vitureira Paz (born July 31, 1962), known professionally as Humberto de Vargas is a Uruguayan television presenter, radio broadcaster and actor. He began his career as a child actor in radio drama, before later joining Channel 10, where he hosted numerous programs and served as the network's institutional voice for more than four decades.

== Early life ==
Humberto Gerardo Vitureira Paz was born in Montevideo on 31 July 1963, the son of journalist Humberto Vitureira—known professionally as Humberto De Feo—and radio, theatre, and stage actress Marisa Paz. In 1969, the family moved to Durazno due to his mother's employment as a civil servant. The family later moved to Canelones in 1973, and in 1977 they settled permanently in Montevideo, where De Vargas began working in radio, which led him to leave secondary education.

== Career ==
In 1969, at the age of seven, he took part in the radio drama El Padre Vicente, portraying the child version of the title character. In 1977, at the age of fourteen, he competed in the singing contest El Millonario, hosted by Mario De Carlo, who suggested that he adopt a more artistic stage name. Vitureira subsequently chose De Vargas, the second surname of his great-grandmother. During his later teenage years, he worked for several radio stations.

In 1982, he was hired by Channel 10 to host La revista estelar, which premiered in June and remained on air until 1996. From then on, he became a well-known television figure associated with the network. In 1983, he made his stage debut as part of the cast of Death of a Salesman, a performance for which he received the Florencio Award for Best Newcomer.

In 2004, he was part of the cast of the fantasy drama film Alma mater, which was selected to participate in the fifth edition of Cine en Construcción, a section of the San Sebastián International Film Festival. From that year until 2008, he hosted Desafío al corazón, a reality television program in which challenges were carried out to raise donations for charitable institutions. In 2006, during the filming of the program, the event known as the Young Tragedy occurred. In 2008, he hosted ¿Qué dice la gente?, the first Uruguayan adaptation of the U.S. game show Family Feud.

In February 2010, De Vargas made his debut as host of the morning show Arriba gente, and in May of that year he began hosting Vivila otra vez alongside María Inés Obaldía. In 2011, he was cast as Rubens Robaina in Channel 10's telenovela Porque te quiero así. In 2012, he starred in the film 3, directed by Pablo Stoll and screened at the Cannes Film Festival. In 2017, he starred in the musical Fiddler on the Roof at Teatro El Galpón. His portrayal of Tevye received critical acclaim and earned him the Florencio Award for Best Actor, while the production won the award for Best Musical Comedy.

From 2023 to 2024, he was part of the on-air staff of the cable television channel VTV, where he hosted several programs, including the network’s prime-time newscast and the Christmas and New Year’s Eve specials.

== Filmography ==
=== Television ===
Year	Title	Role	Notes
1982–1994	La revista estelar	Himself	Host
2004–2008	Desafío al corazón	Herself	Host
2007	Piso 8	Doctor	1 episode
2008	¿Qué dice la gente?	Himself	Host
2010–2011	Porque te quiero así	Rubens Robaina	Main cast
2010–2022	Arriba gente	Himself	Co-host
2010–2022	Vivila otra vez	Himself	Co-host
2021	La mañana en casa	Himself	Co-host
2022	Porno y helado	Sergio Vieira	Recurring role
2023–2024	Día a día	Himself	Co-host
2023–2024	VTV al día	Himself	Host
2023–2024	Todo Uruguay	Himself	Host
2023–2024	VTV Noticias — Edición Mediodia	Himself	Host
2024	VTV Noticias — Edición Central	Himself	Host

=== Film ===
Year	Title	Role
2004	Alma mater	Jorge
2012	3	Rodolfo
2023	Oliva	Salvador

=== Theatre ===
Year	Title	Role	Playwright/Director	Venue	Ref.
1983	Death of a Salesman	Biff Loman	Júver Salcedo	Teatro Stella D'Italia, Montevideo	
2001	Copenhague	Werner Heisenberg	Jorge Denevi	Teatro Stella D'Italia, Montevideo	
2016	Sangre en los tacones	Niní	Himself	Teatro Delaguja, Montevideo	
2017–2018	Fiddler on the Roof	Tevye	Ignacio Cardozo	Teatro El Galpón, Montevideo	
2020	La verdad	Miguel	Mario Morgan	Teatro del Notariado, Montevideo	

== Personal life ==
In the late 1980s, De Vargas was in a relationship with Argentine-born television presenter and astrologer Verónica Lavalle, who would later host a daytime program on Channel 10. He was subsequently married to athlete and news presenter Laura Daners, with whom he has a daughter. In 1999, he married Rosy Alhadeff after a three-year relationship. The couple had two children, and divorced in 2020. In the years that followed, the former spouses were involved in legal proceedings concerning spousal maintenance.

In 2021, De Vargas publicly revealed that he had been struggling with depression, which he attributed to a family crisis following his divorce from Alhadeff and a period of estrangement from his children.

=== Legal issues and controversies ===
On 12 July 2022, De Vargas was arrested on Avenida Italia in Montevideo for driving under the influence of alcohol and at high speed, as well as for contempt of authority after attempting to flee and allegedly assaulting and threatening officers of the National Police. On 4 August, a Misdemeanor Court sentenced him to eighteen days of community service.

Following an initial decision to remove the episode of Vivila otra vez scheduled to air on Sunday, 17 July, Channel 10 announced in mid-August the definitive termination of De Vargas's association with the network.
