= María Inés Obaldía =

Uruguayan television presenter, educator, producer, journalist and politician

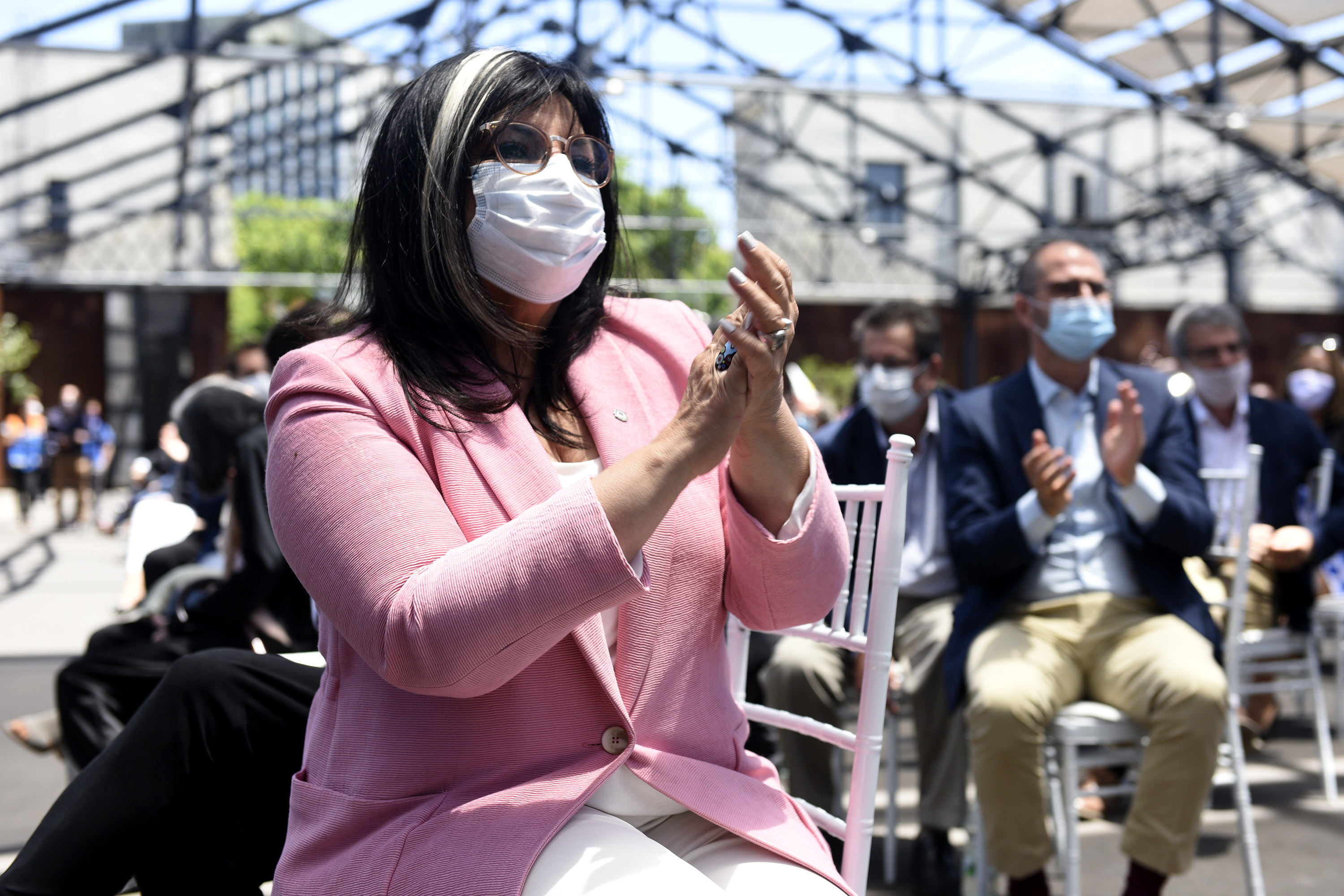
- María Inés Obaldía in 2020.
- Born: María Inés Obaldía Miraballes; 20 June 1959 (age 67); Montevideo, Uruguay
- Education: Instituto de Profesores Artigas
- Occupations: host, professor, producer, journalist, public servant
- Children: Joaquín
- Parents: José María Obaldía (father); Elsa Miraballes (mother)
- Awards: United Nations Messenger of Peace in 2004

María Inés Obaldía Miraballes (born 20 June 1959) is a Uruguayan television presenter, educator, producer, journalist and politician, public serving as Director of Culture of the Municipality of Montevideo since 27 November 2020.

== Early life ==
María Inés Obaldía was born in Montevideo, as the daughter of Elsa Miraballes and writer José María Obaldía. Before entering the media, she taught secondary school literature.

== Career ==
=== Media ===
She has worked at Channel 10 for several years. She has hosted programs such as Caleidoscópio, Será Posible, and Sin Misterio, and since 2010 has headed Vivila Otra Vez alongside Humberto de Vargas.

As a speaker, she participated in the radio programs En vivo y en directo (Radio Sarandí) and Entre todos (El Espectador). In 2014, she hosted De 10 a 12 on Radio Uruguay.

On television, she was a journalist for the news program Subrayado (Channel 10) and coordinated, produced, and hosted Caleidoscopio, Sin Misterio, Será posible, Memoria Colectiva, and Vivila Otra Vez. In 2004, she was named a United Nations Messenger of Peace.

From 2015 to 2020 she hosted the morning television show La mañana en casa on Channel 10, and from 2016, La tarde en casa on the same station.

=== Politics ===
In October 2020, she left television, after being confirmed to be part of the city's cabinet, in the position of Director of Culture of the Municipality of Montevideo, by the elected Intendant, Carolina Cosse. She took office on November 27.
