= Jorge Ottati =

Jorge Ottati may refer to:

- Jorge Ottati (Senior), sports announcer
- Jorge Ottati (Junior), his son, sports announcer
