= Obaldía =

Obaldía is a surname. Notable people with the surname include:

- Isabel de Obaldía (born 1957), Panamanian glass artist
- José de Obaldía (1806–1889), Neogranadine statesmen and lawyer, President of the Republic of the New Granada
- José Domingo de Obaldía (1845–1910), President of Panama from 1908 to 1910
- José María Obaldía (1925–2025), Uruguayan teacher, poet and lexicographer
- María Inés Obaldía (born 1959), Uruguayan communicator
- María Olimpia de Obaldía (1891–1985), Panamanian poet
- René de Obaldia (1918–2022), French playwright and poet

== See also ==
- Obaldía, Panama
