= National Association of Uruguayan Broadcasters =

Organization

The National Association of Uruguayan Broadcasters (Spanish: Asociación Nacional de Broadcasters Uruguayos, ANDEBU) is a trade association and lobby group representing the interests of for-profit radio and television broadcasters in Uruguay.

Established on 20 July 1933, ANDEBU represents around 90 terrestrial radio and television stations, as well as broadcast networks. A member of the International Association of Broadcasting, this association is very influential.

== Members of ANDEBU ==
- CX 4 Radio Rural
- CX 8 Radio Sarandí
- CX 14 El Espectador
- CX 16 Radio Carve
- CX 18 Radio Sarandí Sport
- CX 22 Radio Universal
- CX 24 Nuevo Tiempo
- CX 28 Radio Imparcial
- CX 36 Radio Centenario
- CX 40 Radio Fénix
- CX 42 Emisora Ciudad de Montevideo
- CX 46 Radio América
- CX 58 Radio Clarín
