= Cotelo =

Cotelo is a surname. Notable people with the name include:

- Emiliano Cotelo (born 1958), Uruguayan journalist and radio personality
- Mario Cotelo (born 1975), Spanish retired professional footballer
- Ruben Cotelo (1930–2006), Uruguayan writer, journalist and literary critic
- Valeria Cotelo (born 1984), Argentine women's international footballer
