= RNU (disambiguation) =

RNU or rnu may stand for:

- Republican Network for Unity, Northern Ireland
- Russian National Union, Russia
- Russian National Unity, Russia
- Russian National Unity (2000), Russia. Organization after the split with the founder A. Barkashov.
- RNU, Ranau Airport, Malaysia
- Radiodifusión Nacional del Uruguay
- rnu (Rowett nude), a hairlessness gene in laboratory rats

== See also ==
- RNU2, a human gene
