= Arriba gente =

Uruguayan morning television show

- Genre: Morning news and talk
- Presented by: Alfredo Dante; Magdalena Prado; Paola Botti
- Country of origin: Uruguay
- Original language: Spanish

Production
- Production locations: Channel 10 Headquarters, Montevideo
- Running time: 150 minutes
- Production company: Channel 10

Original release
- Network: Channel 10
- Release: February 8, 2010 – present

Arriba gente (English: Wake Up People!) is an Uruguayan morning television show that is broadcast on Channel 10. It debuted on February 8, 2010 and is broadcast live every weekday from 08:00 am to 10:30 am. The programme covers a wide range of political and current affairs topics, featuring news coverage, interviews, and guest appearances.

== History ==
The programme premiered on Monday, 8 February 2010. At its debut, it was hosted by Humberto de Vargas, Ignacio Martirené, and Gabriela Lavarello, with Danilo Tegaldo as a reporter. Voice-over narration was initially provided by an unnamed male announcer. In mid-2010, several months after the programme’s debut, De Vargas temporarily stepped away from the show for approximately two months in order to take part in the filming of the feature film 3, in which he starred.

In 2014, Verónica Chevalier joined the programme as narrator and voice-over announcer. Toward the end of that year, Ignacio Martirené departed from the show. In 2015, Gabriela Lavarello left her hosting role and was replaced by Danilo Tegaldo, who had previously been responsible for reports and live segments. María José Pino subsequently joined the programme to take over field reporting duties.

In 2017, the programme underwent further changes, with Lorena Bomio joining as an anchor and Magdalena Correa joining the field reporting team, replacing María José Pino. In 2021, Danilo Tegaldo left the programme to assume anchoring duties on the midday edition of Subrayado, and later that year, Magdalena Correa became one of the programme’s anchors. In 2022, De Vargas exited the show following a network’s decision, after having been on leave since late 2021 due to personal matters.

In 2024, Alfredo Dante, formerly of Subrayado Sábado, joined the hosting team. In April of that year, Verónica Chevalier left the programme’s field reporting segment. On 12 March 2025, Magdalena Correa left both the programme and Channel 10 following her decision to relocate to Mexico. Later that month, on 31 March 2025, journalist Magdalena Prado joined the programme as an anchor. In early April, Lorena Bomio left the show, coinciding with journalist Paola Botti joining the programme.

== On-air staff ==
=== Current ===
- Alfredo Dante (Co-Anchor; 2024–present)
- Magdalena Prado (Co-Anchor; 2025–present)
- Paola Botti (Co-Anchor; 2025–present)

=== Former on-air staff ===
- Humberto de Vargas (Co-Anchor; 2010–2021)
- Ignacio Martirené (Co-Anchor; 2010–2014)
- Gabriela Lavarello (Co-Anchor; 2010–2015)
- Verónica Chevalier (Announcer; 2014–2022; Reporter; 2022–2024)
- María José Pino (Reporter; 2015–2017)
- Danilo Tegaldo (Reporter; 2010–2015; Co-Anchor; 2015–2021)
- Magdalena Correa (Reporter; 2017–2020; Co-Anchor; 2022–2025)
- Lorena Bomio (Co-Anchor; 2017–2025)
