= Antonio Mercader =

Uruguayan journalist, lawyer, and politician (1944–2019)

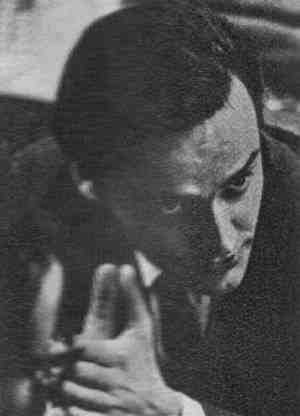
- Antonio Mercader in 1969

Minister of Education and Culture
- In office 1 March 2000 – 12 November 2002
- President: Jorge Batlle
- Preceded by: Yamandú Fau
- Succeeded by: Leonardo Guzmán
- In office 19 August 1992 – 1 March 1995
- President: Luis Alberto Lacalle
- Preceded by: Guillermo García Costa
- Succeeded by: Samuel Lichtensztejn

Personal details
- Born: Antonio Luis Mercader Urvoy; August 24, 1944 Madrid, Spain
- Died: January 29, 2019 (aged 74) Montevideo, Uruguay
- Education: University of the Republic

Antonio Luis Mercader Urvoy (29 August 1944 - 29 January 2019) was a Spanish-born Uruguayan journalist, lawyer and politician. A member of the National Party, he served twice as Minister of Education and Culture, from 1992 to 1995, and again from 2000 to 2002.

== Biography ==
Mercader was born in Madrid, Spain on August 29, 1944, to a Spanish Republican father from Catalonia and a French mother. His paternal uncle was Ramón Mercader, the NKVD secret agent who assassinated Leon Trotsky. In 1953, at the age of nine, he emigrated with his family to Uruguay.

He graduated from the University of the Republic with a law degree. In 1964 he began his journalistic career, working a few months in the La Mañana newspaper, to then go on to act as editor of El Diario. In journalistic mission he traveled different countries of Latin America and Europe. In 1965 he traveled to Chile thanks to a scholarship resulting from an agreement between the Chilean Journalists Circle and the Uruguayan Press Association. At the end of the 1960s he had a weekly television program on television. Twice Minister of Education and Culture of Uruguay (1992-1995 and 2000-2002), he was one of the founders of the Bachelor of Communication Sciences in the University of the Republic. He has been a professor at that University and at the Catholic University of Uruguay. Fulbright researcher in communication at the University of Puerto Rico and Florida (Gainesville), USA. He was director of the newspapers La Mañana and El Diario de Uruguay. He was a lawyer, a long-time journalist and author of several books on communication topics.

He married the accountant Rosario Medero, with whom he had three daughters: Pilar, Agustina and Amparo.

Graduated as a lawyer in the Faculty of Law of the University of the Republic.

Militant in the ranks of Herrerismo, during the presidency of Luis Alberto Lacalle he was curator of the Uruguayan pavilion at the Universal Exposition of Seville, and then Minister of Education and Culture between 1992 and 1995. He was ambassador of Uruguay to the OAS from 1996 to the 2000. Later, during the presidency of Jorge Batlle, he returned to occupy the same ministerial chair (2000-2002), accompanied in the undersecretary by José Carlos Cardoso Silva.

He lectured as University professor of Social Communication at UCUDAL.
