= Ruben Cotelo =

Uruguayan writer, journalist, and literary critic

Ruben Cotelo (October 31, 1930 – September 24, 2006) was an Uruguay writer, journalist, and literary critic, known for his acute reviews on literature and cinema. He was married and divorced. He had three sons and one daughter. Emiliano Cotelo, his oldest son, is a radio journalist in Uruguay.

== Education and academics ==
Ruben Cotelo was born in Montevideo. His father was a Galician immigrant, and his mother was from Uruguay. Ruben Cotelo first studied Art, then Law at the Universidad de la Republica in Montevideo, and finally Journalism at the Indiana University (Bloomington) under Professor Floyd G. Arpan.

Although Ruben Cotelo did not teach formally, he participated in numerous lectures and conferences in Argentina, Mexico and the United States. In June 1989 he lectured on Uruguay’s Politics, Economy and Society at the Universidad de Belgrano in Buenos Aires. In the 1990s he was advisor to Jorge Brovetto, then Chancellor of the Universidad de la Republica.

== Journalism and professional work ==
Since the 1950s Ruben Cotelo reviewed cinema and literature for the newspaper El País and the weekly Marcha. At El País he directed the weekly Literature Supplement from 1955 to 1966 and the news desk until 1968. In the 1960s he also contributed to American newspapers (The Record of Hackensack, New Jersey, Oakland Tribune, California). He was war correspondent to the Vietnam War in 1967.

In 1969 he became editor and international expert for Cinterfor an agency of the ILO, International Labor Organization for whom he traveled extensively in the Americas and Europe. After his retirement he wrote for literary publications such as Vuelta (Buenos Aires), Jaque and Alternativa (Montevideo) and the Revista Iberoamericana de Literatura (Detroit).

Ruben Cotelo died in 2006 after a long battle with cancer. He left unfinished essays, studies and manuscripts on Vivian Trias, Juan Carlos Onetti, Justino Zavala Muniz, and other literature figures of Uruguay.

== Legacy ==
After his death, Coteloʼs family donated his personal library of approximately ten thousand volumes to the Universidad Católica (Uruguay).

The Cotelo family has donated his archive and personal items to the Instituto de Letras at the Facultad de Humanidades y Ciencias de la Educación, National University (Uruguay).

== Works ==
- Narradores Uruguayos Caracas, Monte Ávila, 1969
- Carlos Real de Azúa de cerca y de lejos Montevideo, Ediciones del Nuevo Mundo, 1987 (Mención de Honor Especial, Concurso Literario del Municipio, 1988)

== Co-author ==
- Eduardo Acevedo Díaz Capítulo Oriental No. 6, Cedal, 1968.
- Felisberto Hernández Fundación de Cultura Universitaria, 1970.
- En Torno a Juan Carlos Onetti Fundacion de Cultura Universitaria, 1974.
- Historias de la vida privada en el Uruguay Santillana, 1996.
- La Tierra Purpúrea. William H. Hudson Prólogo. Banda Oriental, 1999.
