= INTS12 =

Protein-coding gene in the species Homo sapiens

Identifiers
- Aliases: INTS12, INT12, PHF22, SBBI22, integrator complex subunit 12
- External IDs: OMIM: 611355; MGI: 1919043; GeneCards: INTS12
Available structures
PDB	Ortholog search: PDBe RCSB
PDB	List of PDB id codes 1WEV

Gene location (Mouse)
Chr.	Chromosome 3 (mouse)
Band	3|3 G3	Start	132,797,601 bp
Band	3|3 G3	End	132,816,749 bp
RNA expression pattern
Bgee	Human / Mouse (ortholog); Top expressed in: oocyte; secondary oocyte; right ventricle; islet of Langerhans; gastrocnemius muscle; jejunal mucosa; triceps brachii muscle; ganglionic eminence; biceps brachii; Achilles tendon / Top expressed in: secondary oocyte; genital tubercle; zygote; primary oocyte; tail of embryo; granulocyte; otic placode; medial ganglionic eminence; epiblast; maxillary prominence; More reference expression data
BioGPS	n/a
Gene ontology
Molecular function	protein binding; metal ion binding
Cellular component	integrator complex; nucleoplasm; nucleus
Biological process	snRNA processing; snRNA transcription by RNA polymerase II; snRNA 3'-end processing
Sources:Amigo / QuickGO
Orthologs
Databases	NCBI: entry
Species	Human	Mouse
Entrez	57117	71793
Ensembl	n/a	ENSMUSG00000028016
UniProt	Q96CB8	Q9D168
RefSeq (mRNA)	NM_001142471; NM_020395	NM_027927
RefSeq (protein)	NP_001135943; NP_065128; NP_001135943.1; NP_065128.2	NP_082203
Location (UCSC)	n/a	Chr 3: 132.8 – 132.82 Mb
PubMed search
- Wikidata
View/Edit Human	View/Edit Mouse

Integrator complex subunit 12 (Int12) also known as PHD finger protein 22 (PHF22) is a protein that in humans is encoded by the INTS12 gene.

INTS12 is a subunit of the Integrator complex, which associates with the C-terminal domain of RNA polymerase II large subunit (POLR2A) and mediates 3-prime end processing of small nuclear RNAs U1 (RNU1) and U2 (RNU2)
