= José Amorín Batlle =

Uruguayan lawyer and politician

José Gerardo Amorín Batlle
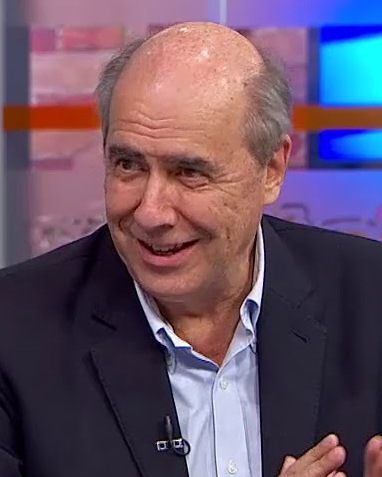
- Amorin Batlle in 2019.

Minister of Education and Culture
- In office 5 October 2004 – 1 March 2005
- President: Jorge Batlle
- Preceded by: Leonardo Guzmán
- Succeeded by: Jorge Brovetto

Representative at the Chamber of Deputies
- In office 1 March 2005 – 15 February 2010
- Constituency: Montevideo

Senator
- Incumbent
- Assumed office 15 February 2010

Personal details
- Born: 9 November 1954 (age 71) Montevideo, Uruguay
- Party: Colorado Party
- Other political affiliations: List 15, Batllist Proposal (Proba)
- Spouse: Elita del Campo Rivas
- Children: Three
- Parent(s): Julio Amorín Larrañaga and Susana Batlle
- Education: University of the Republic

José Gerardo Amorín Batlle (born 9 November 1954 in Montevideo) is an Uruguayan lawyer and politician of the Colorado Party. He currently serves as president of the State Insurance Bank since 2020. He previously served as Senator of the Republic from 2010 to 2019, as National Representative from 2000 to 2010 and as Minister of Education and Culture from 2004 to 2005.

== Early life and education ==
Amorín Batlle was born in Montevideo on November 9, 1954, the son of Julio Amorín Larrañaga and Susana Batlle Iribarne. Raised in a political family, his father served as a minister of labour and social welfare in the first months of Juan María Bordaberry's presidency, and his uncle was Ernesto Amorín Larrañaga, a National Party politician. His mother was the cousin of Jorge Batlle, president from 2000 to 2005.

He attended The British Schools of Montevideo and graduated from the University of the Republic with a law degree. While completing his studies, he joined the civil service, as an official at the National Colonization Institute, and in the legal division of University of Labor of Uruguay.

From 1986 to 1987 he served as Legal Secretary of the Board of the National Port Administration (ANP), between 1991 and 1995 as advisor to the then president of the National Administration of Power Plants and Electrical Transmissions Mario Reibakas and in 1996 as legal advisor to the management of the Banco de Previsión Social. That year he stopped being a civil servant to become main partner of the Amorín-Larrañaga law firm.

== Political career ==
Coming from a political family, he has been a member of the List 15 faction of the Colorado Party since he was young. He participated in the campaign for the "No" option in the 1980 constitutional referendum.
