= Cx4 =

Cx4 may refer to:

- The Beretta Cx4 Storm, a pistol-caliber carbine
- The Cx4 chip, a math coprocessor by Capcom
- The Mazda CX-4, compact crossover vehicle
- 10GBASE-CX4, a copper based 10 Gigabit Ethernet PHY
- CX 4 Radio Rural, a radio station in Uruguay
