= Radio 1010 (Uruguay) =

Radio 1010 (CX24)
Montevideo; Uruguay
- Broadcast area: Uruguay
- Frequency: 1010 AM

Programming
- Format: Sports
- Affiliations: ANDEBU

Ownership
- Owner: SADREP
- Sister stations: CX16 Radio Carve

History
- First air date: April 19, 1935

Technical information
- Licensing authority: FCC
- Power: 25 kW

Links
- Public license information: Public file; LMS
- Website: 1010 AM

Radio 1010 is a Uruguayan Spanish-language AM radio station that broadcasts from Montevideo.

It currently has a sports format, with partisan football broadcasts of Nacional (Pasión tricolor) and Peñarol (Fútbol a lo Peñarol), and the daily sports talk show A fondo led by Jorge da Silveira. From 2015 to 2021, Julio Ríos hosted sports talk show Las voces del fútbol at the station.
