= Adela Reta =

Uruguayan lawyer (1921–2001)

Minister of Education and Culture
- In office 1985–1990
- President: Julio María Sanguinetti

Personal details
- Born: July 9, 1921 Uruguay
- Died: April 3, 2001 (aged 79)
- Party: Colorado
- Occupation: Lawyer; jurist; politician

Adela Reta (9 July 1921– 3 April 2001) was a Uruguayan lawyer, jurist and politician who served as Minister of Education and Culture from 1985 to 1990 under President Julio María Sanguinetti.

== Biography ==
In 1983-1984 she took part in the Committee on Human Rights, denouncing atrocities during the civic-military dictatorship, together with other notable people like Horacio Terra Gallinal, Rodolfo Canabal, Luis Hierro Gambardella, Manuel Flores Mora, Eduardo Jaurena, Francisco Ottonelli, and Alberto Zumarán.

A member of the Colorado Party, she was Minister of Education and Culture during the first presidential term of Julio María Sanguinetti. She spent her last years as Director of SODRE.
