= Carlos Solé =

Uruguayan sports journalist

Carlos Solé (October 9, 1916 – May 9, 1975) was an Uruguayan sports journalist.

== Biography ==
He was born on October 9, 1916, in Montevideo. On October 12, 1935, three days after his 18th birthday he debuted as a sportscaster on CX6 Radio SODRE, broadcasting the soccer game between Bella Vista and River Plate of Uruguay. This was not his radio debut as he had already worked on several stations as a weatherman. Solé earned his greatest interest from the public when he broadcast from Rio de Janeiro, the final match of the 1950 World Cup between Brazil and Uruguay. Uruguay beat Brazil 2-1 and thanks to this historic broadcast the Uruguayan population heard of this great accomplishment in soccer history. In the 1950s he was the most listened to sportscaster in Uruguay, according to the survey conducted by the agency Impetu. More than 70% of the Uruguayan people listened to his broadcasts. His spectacular broadcast of the 1954 World Cup held in Switzerland, and specially the match between Uruguay vs. Hungary was the highlight of his career. In 1966 he was invited to participate on a televisión show called Glorias Deportivas (Sports Glory). Due to his harsh and critical opinion of soccer coaches, calling them the “pimps” of soccer, he was sentenced without prison. From 1946 until his death on May 9, 1975, he worked for Radio Sarandí.
