= El Diario (Uruguay) =

- Type: Daily newspaper
- Owner: Seusa
- Founded: 1923
- Ceased publication: 2000
- Headquarters: Montevideo, Uruguay

El Diario was an influential Uruguayan daily newspaper, with evening circulation.

It was established in 1923. Up to the 1980s it was published by Seusa, the same company owning another important newspaper, La Mañana.

Several notable journalists wrote on its pages, among others: Carlos Martínez Moreno, Zelmar Michelini, Antonio Mercader, Eduardo J. Corso, Iván Kmaid, Eduardo Navia, Héctor Rivadavia Gómez. Also some foreigners, such as Giselda Zani or the Italian Margherita Sarfatti.

It ceased to exist in the 2000s.
