= Young, Uruguay =

Young Ciudad de Young
- City
- Location in Uruguay
- Coordinates: 32°42′0″S 57°38′0″W
- Country: Uruguay
- Department: Río Negro Department
- Founded: 1910
- Elevation: 63 m (207 ft)

Population (2011 Census)
  - Total: 16,756
  - Demonym: younguense
- Time zone: UTC -3
- Postal code: 65100
- Dial plan: +598 4567 (+4 digits)

Young is a city in the centre of the Río Negro Department of Uruguay.

== Geography ==
It is located on Route 3 and Route 25, about 120 kilometres (75 mi) northwest of Trinidad, the capital of Flores Department.

== History ==
On 17 August 1920, the group of houses known as "Estación de Young" was declared a "Pueblo" (village) by the Act of Ley Nº 7.256. Its status was elevated to "Villa" (town) on 14 August 1958 by the Act of Ley Nº 12.515 and then, on 15 October 1963, to "Ciudad" (city) by the Act of Ley Nº 13.167.

On 17 March 2006, in the Tragedia de Young, eight people were crushed to death in a televised event in which they pulled a train to raise money for the local hospital.

== Population ==
In 2011, Young had a population of 16,756.

Year	Population
1963	7,974
1975	11,015
1985	12,249
1996	14,567
2004	14,251
2011	16,756

Source: Instituto Nacional de Estadística de Uruguay

== Places of worship ==
- Sacred Heart of Jesus Parish Church (Roman Catholic)
