= Tragedia de Young =

On 17 March 2006, eight people were killed in Young, Uruguay during a challenge for a television programme. The challenge involved pulling a train, which gained speed and crushed contestants. An engineer who transported the train and released the brakes to start the challenge was tried for manslaughter, and was acquitted. The event is known in Uruguay as the Tragedia de Young.

== Event ==
The programme Desafío al Corazón ("Challenge the Heart") was broadcast on Canal 10 and hosted by Humberto de Vargas. It gave cash rewards to charitable organisations for completing challenges. In this episode, the hospital in Young, Río Negro Department, was competing for money for its heating bills.

The contestants were pulling a 56-ton train 75 metres, commemorating the 75th anniversary of the hospital, and wished to raise US$30,000. Three hundred people, including children and the elderly, were pulling ropes, while 2,000 people watched. The event began ten minutes early and in rainy conditions. Two citizens of neighbouring Argentina were among the eight dead, including one woman who died days later.

== Investigation ==
A reconstruction of the event was ordered by a judge, with an unprecedented police presence to keep residents at least 100 metres away from it.

No organisation behind the event – the Ministry of Public Health, the Río Negro council, Canal 10, the police, the fire department, local businesses and religious organisations – was held responsible. The State Prosecutor charged Héctor Parentini, an engineer for the State Railways Administration for manslaughter, requesting a prison sentence of five years and eight months. He had driven the train from his hometown of Paysandú and released the brakes to start the event. Judge Mario Suárez Suñol acquitted him in May 2009, ruling that the State could not prosecute as, through the Ministry of Public Health, it had authorised the event.
