= 3 (2012 Uruguayan film) =

2012 film

- Film poster
- Directed by: Pablo Stoll
- Starring: Humberto de Vargas
- Cinematography: Barbara Alvarez
- Edited by: Fernando Epstein; Pablo Stoll
- Music by: Sebastián del Muro; Eiras Reverb
- Release date: 20 April 2012
- Country: Uruguay
- Language: Spanish

3 is a 2012 Uruguayan comedy-drama film directed by Pablo Stoll. The film was screened in the Directors' Fortnight section at the 2012 Cannes Film Festival.

== Plot ==
Teenage Ana (Anaclara Ferreyra Palfy) spends her days skipping school and either savoring or evading the attention of her separated parents (Sara Bessio and Humberto de Vargas), who clumsily attempt the rituals of middle age.

== Cast ==
- Humberto de Vargas as Rodolfo
- Sara Bessio as Graciela
- Anaclara Ferreyra Palfy as Ana
- Inés Bortagaray as the adjunct teacher
- Néstor Guzzini as Dustin
- Santiago Pedrero as Víctor
- Matías Ganz as Matías
- Carolina Centurión as Mica
- Fabián Arenillas as a physician
