= Radio Fénix =

CX 40 Radio Fénix
Montevideo; Uruguay
- Broadcast area: Uruguay
- Frequency: 1330 AM

Programming
- Affiliations: ANDEBU

History
- First air date: 1939

Technical information
- Licensing authority: FCC

Links
- Public license information: 40 Radio Fénix Public file; LMS
- Website: Radio Fénix

CX 40 Radio Fénix is a Uruguayan Spanish language AM radio station that broadcasts from Montevideo, Uruguay.

It was established in 1939.

== Selected programs ==
- La voz del agro, run by the PE NE .
