= Sky Sports (Mexico) =

Group of Mexican sports channels

- Logo since 2025 (akin to the European Sky brands)
- Broadcast area: Mexico; Central America
- Headquarters: Mexico City, Mexico

Programming
- Picture format: 1080i HDTV (downscaled to 16:9 576i for the SDTV feed)

Ownership
- Owner: Sky Mexico

History
- Launched: June 30, 2015; 11 years ago
- Replaced: Planeta Fútbol

Links
- Website: sky.com.mx/sports/

Sky Sports is a group of Mexican subscription sports channels operated by the satellite pay television company Sky Mexico that was launched in 2015 as the replacement of the Planeta Fútbol program.

In December 2020, Sky announced the launch of the Sky Sports premium package with the intention of complementing the entertainment package offered by other pay TV systems that included all Sky exclusive sporting events and tournaments available as prepaid.

== Channels ==
- Sky Sports 1
- Sky Sports 2
- Sky Sports 3

== Programming rights ==
=== Football ===
- La Liga
- Segunda División
- Copa del Rey
- Supercopa de España
- UEFA Nations League (only Mexico)

=== Motorsport ===
- Formula One

=== Hockey ===
- National Hockey League

== Programs broadcast by Sky Sports in Mexico ==
- La Liga World
- La Liga Show
- La Liga Preview
- La Liga Chronicles
- Sky Sports News
- Sky Premier Show
- FEI Classics
- PLTV-World
- Golfing world
