= José María Obaldía =

Uruguayan teacher, writer and lexicographer (1925–2025)

Obaldía on Después vemos, TV CIUDAD

José María Obaldía (Spanish: [xoˈse maˈɾia oβalˈðia]; 16 August 1925 – 16 July 2025) was a Uruguayan teacher, writer and lexicographer. He is the author of song lyrics performed by Los Olimareños and other musical groups. He presided over the Academia Nacional de Letras del Uruguay (National Academy of Letters of Uruguay) between 1999 and 2003.

== Life and career ==
Obaldía was born in Treinta y Tres on 16 August 1925. His poems have been sung by several important Uruguayan singers, such as Los Olimareños, Teresita Minetti, Los del Yerbal, Wilson Prieto, Ricardo Comba, etc.

Obaldía presided over the National Academy of Uruguay from 1999 to 2003.

Obaldía died aged 99, on 16 July 2025. He was the father of television presenter María Inés Obaldía.

== Works ==
- Veinte mentiras de verdad. Cuentos. Edit. Unión del Magisterio (1971), Ediciones de la Banda Oriental (1973, 1993, 1994, 1995, 2003, 2004), Cámara del Libro (1985). Premio Ministerio de Educación y Cultura (1994).
- Versos y canciones en la escuela. En colaboración con Luis Neira. Ediciones de la Banda Oriental, 1973. Premio Ministerio de Instrucción Pública.
- El gaucho. Complementación pedagógica de textos de Roberto Ares Pons. Ediciones de la Banda Oriental, 1973.
- Eduardo Fabini. Soneto. Primer Premio del concurso de la Asociación de Jubilados y Pensionistas Escolares, Centenario de Solís de Mataojo, 1974.
- Antología de la narrativa infantil uruguaya. En colaboración con Luis Neira. Ediciones de la Banda Oriental, 1978.
- Lejos... allá y ayer. Editorial Amauta, 1973. Primer premio concurso Editorial Acali y diario El Día, 1980.
- El habla del pago. Voces y paremias de la región de Treinta y Tres. Ediciones de la Banda Oriental (1988, 2001, 2006)
- Sol de recreo. Poemas. Editorial AULA, 1989.
- Historia de la literatura infantil juvenil uruguaya. En coautoría con Luis Neira. Goethe University Frankfurt, 1978.
- La bandera de jabalí. Novela histórica. Editorial Monteverde, 1993.
- El fantasma del bucanero. Novela histórica. Editorial Reconquista, 1995.
- Bautista el equilibrista. Cuatro cuentos y doce canciones. Ediciones de la Banda Oriental, 1997.
- Tres cuentos del tío. Ediciones de la Banda Oriental, 1997. Premio Ministerio de Educación.
- Como pata de olla. Cuentos. Ediciones de la Banda Oriental, 1997. Dibujos de Carlos Pieri.
- El matrero y otros cuentos en prosa. Cuentos. Ediciones de la Banda Oriental, 2001.
- Telmo Batalla y otras prosas viejas. Cuentos. Ediciones de la Banda Oriental, 2004.
- Cuentos del pago. Cuentos. Editorial Planeta, 2013.
- Entre dos luces. Cuentos. Ediciones de la Banda Oriental, 2020.
