= Emiliano Cotelo =

Uruguayan journalist and radio personality

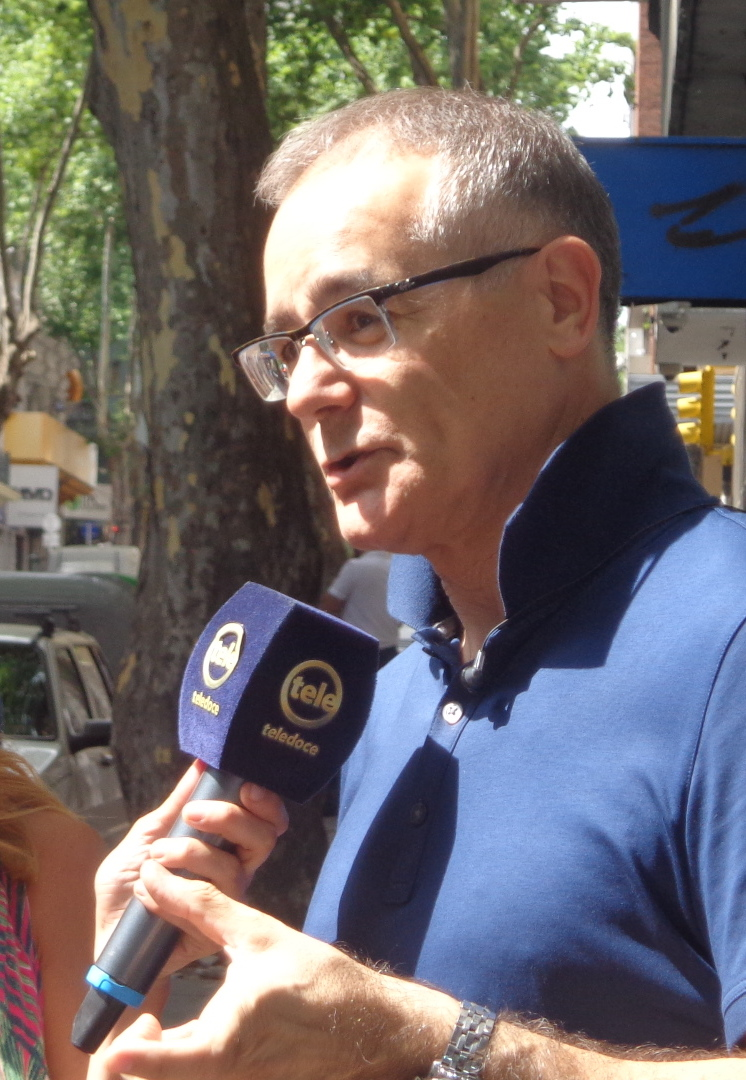
Emiliano Cotelo (2014)

Emiliano Cotelo (born August 25, 1958) is a Uruguayan journalist and radio personality, known for his interviews with local and international politicians. His morning radio show “En Perspectiva” has been on the air continuously since 1985. Emiliano Cotelo is married to journalist and producer Alexandra Morgan. They have two sons and one daughter.

== Education and career ==
Emiliano Cotelo studied Engineering at the Universidad de la Republica in Montevideo, Uruguay. He began his radio career in 1976 producing and hosting his music program “Perfiles” in the state-owned SODRE stations. He started as a radio journalist in the newscasts of CX 30 La Radio (1983–85). In June 1985 Emiliano Cotelo joined the journalists Enrique Alonso Fernández, Carlos Núñez and Claudio Paolillo, who had recently started the morning show “En Perspectiva”, in Del Palacio FM station. After 1988, Emiliano Cotelo has hosted the show by himself. In 1992 “En Perspectiva” moved to AM 810 El Espectador station in order to reach wider audiences. In the 2010s he moved to CX 32 Radiomundo.

He has contributed to other media: newspaper El Observador, weekly magazine revista Tres, Channel 10 TV station. He has taught Radio Broadcasting at the Universidad Católica del Uruguay.
