= Radio América (Uruguay) =

CX 46 Radio América
Montevideo; Uruguay
- Frequency: 1450 AM

Programming
- Affiliations: ANDEBU

Technical information
- Licensing authority: FCC

Links
- Public license information: 46 Radio América Public file; LMS
- Website: 1450 AM

CX 46 Radio América is a Uruguayan Spanish language AM radio station that broadcasts from Montevideo, Uruguay.
