= Jorge Ottati (Senior) =

Professor Jorge Ottati was born in Montevideo, Uruguay. He is an international sports announcer and commentator, with a professional career of almost 40 years in radio, written press and television. One of his sons is Jorge Ottati, also a well-known sportscaster.

Ottati has a doctorate in Universal History and has held decision-making positions at the Uruguayan State Department of Culture and Education, having a role in educational projects and the organization of sporting events for Uruguayan high school students. He teaches Sports Journalism at the University of Málaga in Spain and is the President of Círculo de Empresarios Hispanos de Florida. He founded and coached the Men's Basketball Uruguayan University National Team. He played college soccer and professional basketball, and participated in 1999 with success in the World Championship of Basketball for Senior players.

Ottati began his career in 1969; he was part of Radio Ariel’s “Clan 10”. After that, he worked for Radio Universal, Radio Oriental, and SODRE as studio host, reporter and color commentator. He's currently a correspondent in the States for Eurosport-Yahoo Spain, and has been a member of the board at the Association of Sports Journalists of Uruguay.

In the year 2000, PSN (Panamerican Sports Network) launched in Hollywood, Florida, and Ottati was hired from Uruguay and brought to the United States to be one of the talents of the new 24-hour sports network. Prof. Ottati was the color commentator for 2002 World Cup qualifying rounds, Copa Libertadores, NBA, WNBA and hosted several award-winning shows. Among other prestigious sporting events, Prof. Ottati has attended and covered World Cups, Copas América, Copa Libertadores Finals, NBA All Star Games, Tournaments of the Americas. Due to his unique triple condition of athlete, journalist and educator, Ottati is a college professor of Journalism who permanently speaks at seminars and lectures.

Since 2006, Ottati worked for ESPN Deportes Radio, hosting shows such as “Espacio NBA”, “Atacando en Alemania”, “Memorias del Fútbol”, “Destino Copa América” and “Destino Sudáfrica”. He has also been the commentator of live game broadcasts for UEFA Champions League, Copa América Venezuela 2007 and the 2007 NBA Finals.
