= Pablo Stoll =

Uruguayan film director and screenwriter (born 1974)

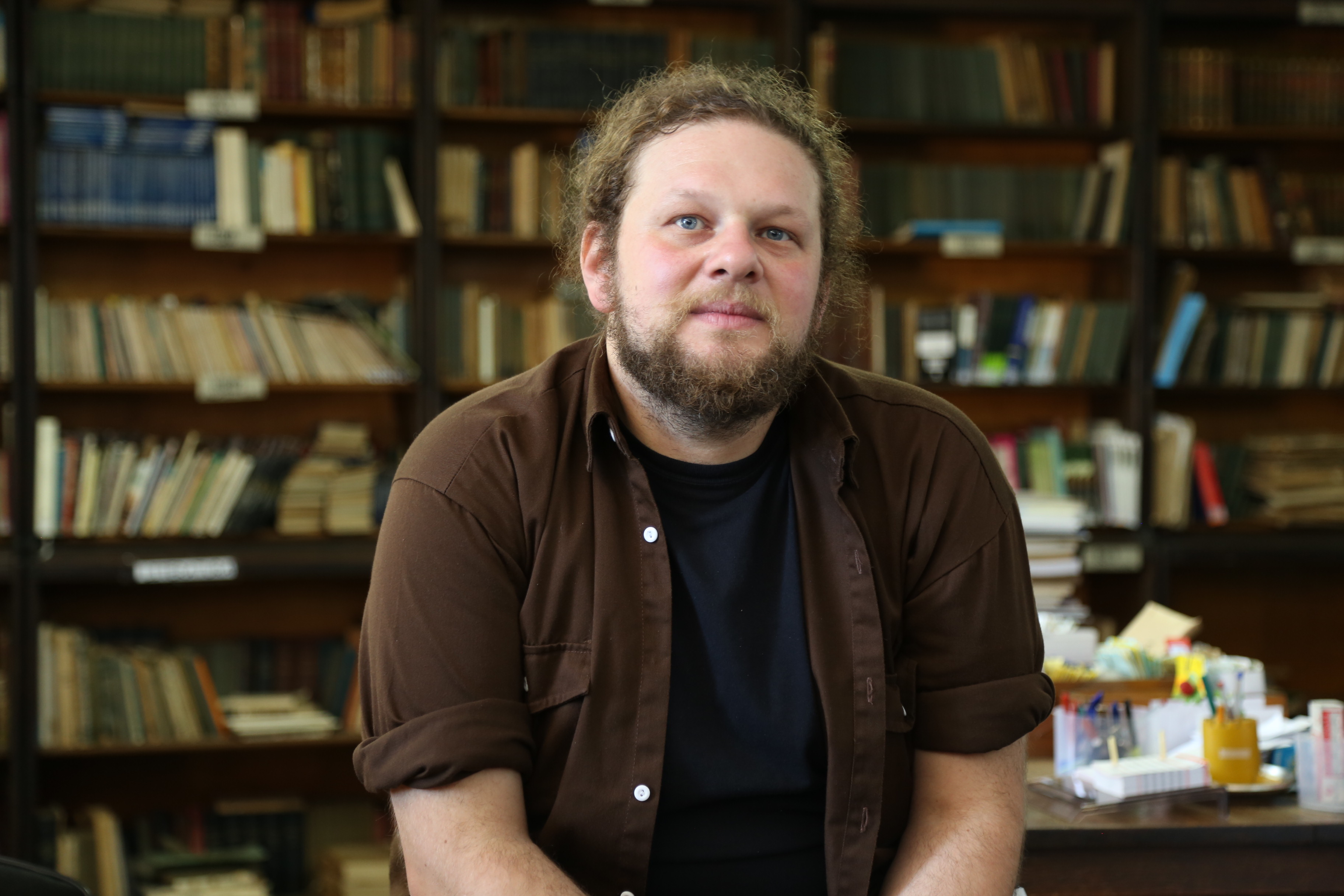
- Born: Pablo Stoll; 13 October 1974 (age 51); Montevideo, Uruguay
- Occupations: film director, screenwriter

Pablo Stoll (born 13 October 1974) is a Uruguayan film director and screenwriter.

He attended the Catholic University of Uruguay where he studied social communication, it was here that he started to direct short films and his collaboration with fellow student Juan Pablo Rebella first began. After graduating in 1999 he and Rebella started work on their first feature film, 25 Watts (2001), it went on to win several international awards: Best Feature Film Award at the Rotterdam International Film Festival, the Best 1st Feature Film Award at the La Habana Film Festival, the FIPRESCI Award and the Best Male Actor Award at the Independent Film Festival Buenos Aires.

In 2004 Stoll and Rebella released their second feature film Whisky. It was a surprise hit at the 2004 Cannes Film Festival opening to much acclaim, winning the Regard Original Award. Whisky also won the Sundance/NHK International Filmmakers Award for Latin-America.

Stoll's first film following Rebella's suicide, Hiroshima (2009), is "a silent musical" in which all verbal communication was reduced to brief intertitles.

In-between his film projects Stoll works as a freelance director for advertising and TV.

His film 3 was selected to be screened in the Directors' Fortnight section at the 2012 Cannes Film Festival.

Pablo Stoll is among the fifteen selected filmmakers (out of 268) at the San Sebastián International Film Festival’s 14th Europe-Latin America Co-Production Forum, during the 73rd festival’s edition (2025). « The projects are presented to potential partners with a view to completing their financing and accessing international markets. »
