= Your Esso Reporter =

American syndicated radio news bulletin

Your Esso Reporter was an American syndicated radio news bulletin, sponsored by Standard Oil of New Jersey under the Esso brand. The five-minute program was aired since 1935 four times a day on radio stations in cities in the United States where Esso operated. The program also had a televised version, being aired on NBC from March to May 1940 and on CBS from July to September 1951.

The news format was exported to other Latin American countries, such as Argentina, Brazil, Chile, Colombia and Venezuela. The news pieces were provided by the UPI agency.
