= Rectovestibular fistula =

A rectovestibular fistula, also referred to simply as a vestibular fistula, is an anorectal congenital disorder where an abnormal connection (fistula) exists between the rectum and the vulval vestibule of the female genitalia.

If the fistula occurs within the hymen, it is known as a rectovaginal fistula, a much rarer condition.

== Presentation ==
=== Complications ===
If a colostomy is not performed immediately after birth, patients with rectovestibular fistulae may present later in life with complications including severe constipation and megacolon (abnormal dilation of the colon), requiring colostomy or further surgery.

== Cause ==
A rectovestibular fistula occurs when the colon or rectum deviates anteriorly. This leads to the formation of an abnormal connection between the rectum and the vulval vestibule, immediately posterior to the hymen, so that an ectopic anus opens into the fourchette, or frenulum, of the labia minora. A common wall is shared between the rectum and vagina above the site of the fistula. Although the opening of the rectum into the anal canal is shorter and narrower than normal, the rectum itself is completely normal.

== Diagnosis ==
The diagnosis of a rectovestibular fistula can be made in female newborns if the vulva is stained with meconium (the earliest form of stool in an infant). The opening of the anus may be difficult to see due to its small size and position, but it may be visible as a thickening of the median perineal raphe with an obvious anal dimple. Patients with rectovestibular fistulae are commonly misdiagnosed with rectovaginal fistulae.

== Management ==
Colostomy is recommended by most surgeons, and has a good prognosis, with 90% of patients regaining normal bowel control. Since the rectal opening and anal orifice in a vestibular fistula tend to be short and narrow, a colostomy is usually performed to allow decompression of the bowel unless the orifice is wide enough to allow normal defecation. Colostomy is often followed by posterior sagittal anorectoplasty (PSARP), a surgical procedure to repair the anal orifice, at a later date. Some surgeons prefer to perform an immediate PSARP without a colostomy first, while others perform neither a colostomy nor a PSARP and instead opt for a simple dilatation of the orifice to allow stool to pass and the bowel to decompress. It has been suggested that only experienced surgeons should perform repair without an initial colostomy.

== Epidemiology ==
Rectovestibular fistula is the most common defect of the rectum and anal canal in females.
