= Laura Daners =

Uruguayan television presenter and journalist (1967–2010)

- Born: 1 February 1967; Montevideo, Uruguay
- Died: 17 September 2010 (aged 43); Montevideo, Uruguay
- Occupation(s): Journalist, television presenter
- Children: 2

Laura Daners Chao (1 February 1967 – 17 September 2010) was an Uruguayan television presenter and journalist.

Daners was a very successful synchronized swimmer and competed for Uruguay at the 1987 Pan American Games in Indianapolis. She started her journalistic career at Canal 5. She then became known to a wider public as the presenter of Telemundo 12 alongside Néber Araújo. Daners had multiple sclerosis, which ultimately led to death. She was the mother of two children and was buried in the Cementerio del Buceo, Montevideo.
