= Radiodifusión Nacional del Uruguay =

Public radio broadcaster of Uruguay

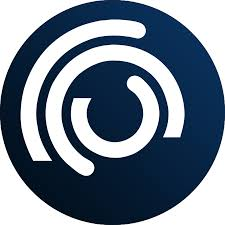
- Established: 2015
- Type: Governmental agency
- Headquarters: Montevideo
- Field: Radio broadcasting
- Parent organization: Servicio de Comunicación Audiovisual Nacional
- Website: mediospublicos.uy

Radiodifusión Nacional del Uruguay (RNU, "National Broadcasting of Uruguay") is the public radio broadcaster of the country of Uruguay. It operates four separate radio stations.

== History ==
The first Uruguayan national broadcaster, SODRE (Official Radio Broadcasting Service), was inaugurated in 1929, and its first station, CX6 650 AM (now Radio Clásica), launched on 1 April 1930. Two additional AM services were added: CX26 1050 AM Radio Uruguay, a national speech station, and CX38 1290 AM Cultura, focused on music. They have since been joined by Babel, an instrumental music station.

As a result of a reorganization of public media in Uruguay, the new Servicio de Comunicación Audiovisual Nacional (National Audiovisual Communication Service) was created in 2015, unifying formerly separate radio, film, and television agencies.

== Services ==
In Montevideo, each of the four stations operates around the clock. Most of the rest of the country is served by a network of regional repeaters that primarily airs programs from Radio Uruguay.

Station	Frequency	Programming
Clásica	650 AM	Classical music
Radio Uruguay	1050 AM/94.7 FM	Talk
Cultura	1290 AM	National music
Babel	97.1 FM (Montevideo); 100.9 (Maldonado); 103.9 (Colonia); 107.7 (Rocha); 93.5 (Chuy); 96.1 (Florida)	Instrumental and world music

== Repeater network ==
City	Frequency	Call sign
Artigas	98.7 MHz	CX254
Bella Unión	100.1 MHz	CX261B
Carmelo	102.7 MHz	CX274B
Chuy	93.5 MHz	CX228
Colonia	103.9 MHz	CX280
Durazno	105.1 MHz	CX286
Florida	96.1 MHz	CX241A
Fray Bentos	102.9 MHz	CX275B
Melo	106.9 MHz	CX295
Mercedes	92.1 MHz	CX221
Minas	106.1 MHz	CX291A
Paso de los Toros	106.1 MHz	CX291
Paysandú	103.5 MHz	CX278A
Rivera	93.9 MHz	CX230
Rocha	107.7 MHz	CX299
Salto	104.3 MHz	CX282
San José	95.1 MHz	CX236D
Tacuarembó	103.7 MHz	CX279
Treinta y Tres	92.7 MHz	CX224
