= Babel (radio station) =

Uruguayan public radio station

Babel (CXD246)
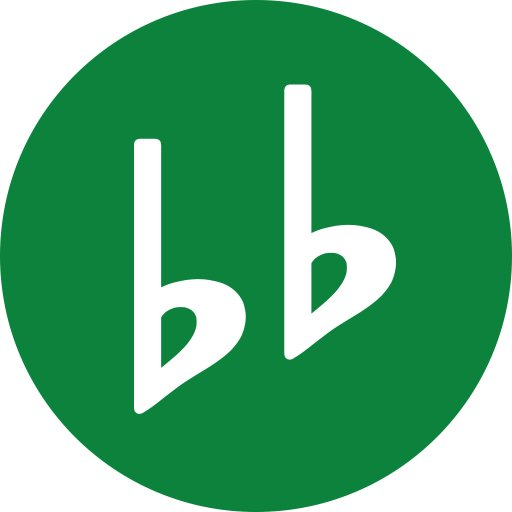

Montevideo; Uruguay
- Frequency: 97.1 MHz (Montevideo)

Programming
- Format: World music

Ownership
- Owner: Radiodifusión Nacional del Uruguay
- Sister stations: Clásica, Radio Uruguay, Emisora del Sur

Technical information
- Repeater: CX265 (100.9 FM) Maldonado

Links
- Website: babel.uy

Babel is a public radio station in Uruguay, broadcasting a world and instrumental music format. It is one of the four services of Radiodifusión Nacional del Uruguay and broadcasts on 97.1 FM in Montevideo and 100.9 FM in Maldonado. In addition to the two full-time stations, RNU's regional repeaters air Babel overnight from 12 to 6 a.m.
