= Clarín 580 AM =

CX58 Radio Clarín
- Montevideo; Uruguay
- Frequency: 580 AM

Programming
- Format: Folkloric music
- Affiliations: ANDEBU

History
- First air date: October 12, 1958

Technical information
- Class: Commercial
- Power: 2 kW

Links
- Website: 580 AM

CX 58 Radio Clarín is a Uruguayan Spanish-language AM radio station that broadcasts from Montevideo.

It specializes in tango music.
