= Ministry of Education and Culture (Uruguay) =

- Ministerio de Educación y Cultura
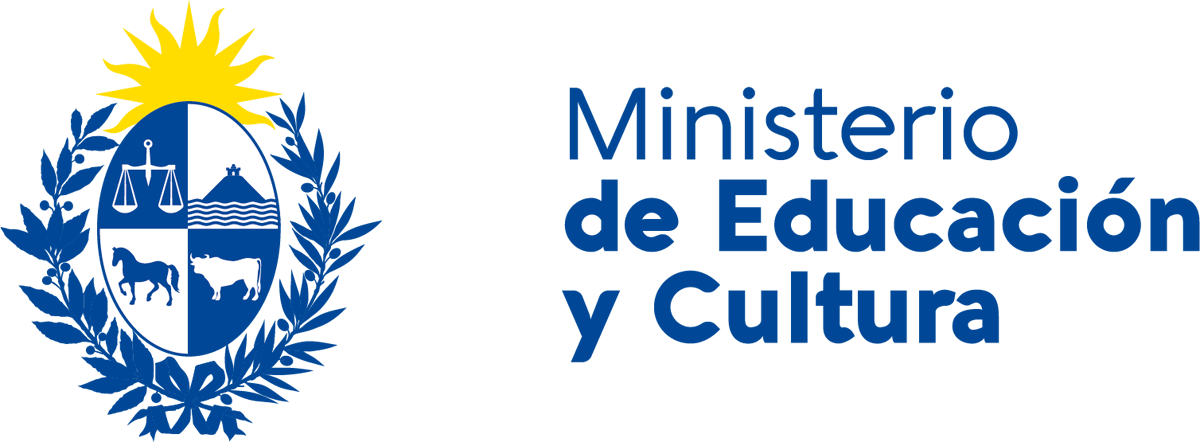

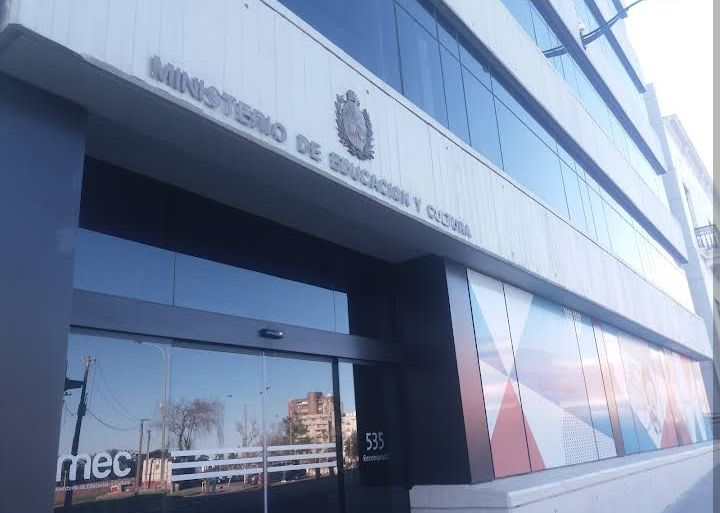
- Headquarters of the Ministry of Education

Ministry overview
- Formed: 26 February 1848
- Jurisdiction: Government of Uruguay
- Headquarters: Montevideo
- Minister responsible: José Carlos Mahía
- Website: Education and Culture

The Ministry of Education and Culture (Spanish: Ministerio de Educación y Cultura) of Uruguay is the ministry of the Government of Uruguay that is responsible for the coordination of national education, the promotion of the country's cultural development, the preservation of the nation's artistic, historical and cultural heritage, as well as innovation, science and technology and the promotion and strengthening of the validity of human rights. It is also responsible for the development of the state communication multimedia system and for promoting the digitized access of the entire population to information.

It is also responsible for the formulation and coordination of policies regarding the judicial defense of the interests of the State and for ensuring the necessary information for the correct application of the law. The Ministry is headquartered in the Reconquista Street in Ciudad Vieja, Montevideo. The current Minister of Education and Culture is José Carlos Mahía, who has held the position since 1 March 2025.

== History ==
The first record of a public body for the administration of education dates from 26 February 1848 with the creation of the Institute of Public Instruction. This institute had executive, technical, and administrative powers. A year later, the University of the Republic was founded, which had among its missions, teaching at all levels, a fact that was never put into practice. In 1891, a cabinet reshuffle was made, becoming the newly created Ministry of Development responsible for the administration of public education.

On 12 March 1907, then President Claudio Williman made a new cabinet reshuffle, dividing the Ministry of Development into the "Ministry of Public Works" on the one hand and the Ministers of Industry, Work and Public Instruction on the other.

In the second presidency of José Batlle y Ordóñez another cabinet reshuffle of the ministries takes place, so on 4 March 1912 the Ministry of Justice and Public Instruction is constituted. Subsequently, on 19 March 1936 the then de facto president Gabriel Terra called him Ministry of Public Instruction and Social Prevision.

In 1967 it receives a new denomination, it began to be called Ministry of Culture, but finally in 1970 it obtained the current denomination of Ministry of Education and Culture.

== List of ministers of education and culture ==
List of ministers of education and culture of Uruguay since 1884 (under its various naming):

Ministers of Justice, Culte and Public Instruction
| Minister | Period |
| Juan Lindolfo Cuestas | 1884–1886 |
| Aureliano Rodríguez Larreta | 1886 |
| Marcelino Berthelot | 1886–1887 |
| Duvimioso Terra | 1886–1888 |
| Martín Beragunde | 1886–1890 |

Ministers of Promotion
| Minister | Period |
| Juan Alberto Capurro | 1891–1893 |
| Juan José Castro | 1894–1897 |
| Jacobo A. Varela | 1897–1899 |
| Carlos María De Pena | 1899 |
| Gregorio L. Rodríguez | 1899–1901 |
| José Serrato | 1903–1904 |
| Juan Alberto Capurro | 1903–1906 |

Ministers of Industry, Work and Public Instruction
| Minister | Period |
| Gabriel Terra | 1907–1911 |
| José Batlle y Ordoñez | 1911 |

Ministers of Justice and Public Instruction
| Minister | Period |
| Baltasar Brum | 1913–1914 |
| Pablo Blanco Acevedo | 1922–1924 |
| Carlos María Prando | 1925–1927 |
| Enrique Rodríguez Fabregat | 1927–1929 |
| Santín Carlos Rossi | 1929–1933 |
| Andrés F. Puyol | 1933 |
| Horacio Abadie Santos | 1933–1934 |
| José Otamendi | 1934–1935 |

Ministers of Public Instruction and Social Prevision
| Minister | Period |
| Martín R. Echegoyen | 1935–1936 |
| Eduardo Víctor Haedo | 1936–1938 |
| Toribio Olaso | 1938–1941 |
| Cyro Giambruno | 1941–1943 |
| Luis Mattiauda | 1943–1946 |
| Juan Carbajal Victorica | 1946–1947 |
| Francisco Forteza | 1947–1948 |
| Oscar Secco Ellauri | 1948–1951 |
| Eduardo Blanco Acevedo | 1951–1952 |
| Justino Zavala Muniz | 1952–1955 |
| Renán Rodríguez | 1955–1956 |
| Clemente Ruggia | 1956–1959 |
| Eduardo Pons Etcheverry | 1959–1963 |
| Juan E. Pivel Devoto | 1963–1967 |

Ministers of Culture
| Minister | Period |
| Luis Hierro Gambardella | 1967–1968 |
| Alba Roballo | 1968–1969 |
| Federico García Capurro | 1969–1970 |

Ministers of Education and Culture
| Minister | Period |
| Carlos M. Fleitas | 1970–1971 |
| Ángel Rath | 1971–1972 |
| Julio María Sanguinetti | 1972–1973 |
| José María Robaina Ansó | 1973 |
| Edmundo Narancio¹ | 1973–1975 |
| Daniel Darracq¹ | 1975–1981 |
| Raquel Lombardo de De Betolaza¹ | 1981–1983 |
| Juan Bautista Schroeder Otero¹ | 1983–1984 |
| Armando López Scavino¹ | 1984–1985 |
| Adela Reta | 1985–1990 |
| Guillermo García Costa | 1990–1993 |
| Antonio Mercader | 1993–1995 |
| Samuel Lichtensztejn | 1995–1998 |
| Yamandú Fau | 1998–2000 |
| Antonio Mercader | 2000–2002 |
| Leonardo Guzmán | 2002–2004 |
| José Amorín Batlle | 2004–2005 |
| Jorge Brovetto | 2005–2008 |
| María Simón | 2008–2010 |
| Ricardo Ehrlich | 2010–2015 |
| María Julia Muñoz | 2015 – 2020 |
| Pablo Da Silveira | 2020 – 2025 |
| José Carlos Mahía | 2025 – Incumbent |
