= Emisora Ciudad de Montevideo =

CX 42 Emisora Ciudad de Montevideo
Montevideo; Uruguay
- Broadcast area: Uruguay
- Frequency: 1370 kHz

Programming
- Affiliations: ANDEBU

History
- First air date: September 23, 1930; 95 years ago
- Last air date: October 3, 2021; 4 years ago

Technical information
- Licensing authority: URSEC
- Power: 2,500 watts

CX 42 Emisora Ciudad de Montevideo was a Uruguayan Spanish-language AM radio station that used to broadcast from Montevideo. on 1370 kHz.

== Programs ==
The programming used to be centered around sports and music.

In 2002 it received a special award for its traditional covering of Carnival shows.

== Financial problems ==
In 2021 the transmitter site was vandalized, many parts of the antenna and transmitter were stolen and the owners considered it was not worth it to reinvest in new equipment and repairs needed to go on air again, so the station went dark and has remained dark ever since.
