= CX 10 Radio Continente =

Radio Continente (CX10)
Montevideo; Uruguay
- Frequency: 730 AM

Links
- Website: 730 AM

CX 10 Radio Continente is a Uruguayan Spanish-language AM radio station that broadcasts from Montevideo. Previously it was known as Radio Ariel, and was managed by Colorado politician Luis Batlle Berres. In 1966 it was acquired by sports newscaster Heber Pinto, who gave it its current name.
