= Kwesé Sports =

Sport website owned by Econet Media

- Kwesé Sports Logo

- Screenshot Kwesé Sports homepage as of April 2016
- Website type: Sport
- Available in: English
- Dissolved: August 5, 2019; 7 years ago
- Successor: ESPN
- Owner: Econet Media Limited
- Website: www.kwesesports.com
- Commercial: Yes
- Registration: Optional
- Launched: 4 December 2015; 10 years ago
- Current status: Replaced by ESPN

Kwesé Sports (Shona: [kwese]) was a sport website serving Sub-Saharan Africa operated by Econet Media, a subsidiary of Econet Wireless. Kwesé Sports was launched on 4 December 2015 with the announcement made by Econet Wireless founder Strive Masiyiwa, on the social networking site Facebook.

== History ==
Strive Masiyiwa, founder and Group Chairman of Econet Wireless made an announcement on 4 December 2015 through his Facebook page of a new pay TV service named Kwesé TV and Kwesé Sports, a website which was live, showing sport news and offering free live streaming of the Copa del Rey football matches (exclude final). The name "Kwesé" was derived from the Shona word kwese which means "everywhere" and "anywhere". Kwesé TV officially launched operations on 30 January 2017.

In August 2019, Econet Media announced the Kwesé TVs (including Sports) was closed effective from 5 August due to crisis and replaced by ESPN Africa on 30 August.

== Past rights ==
=== Association football ===
On 17 March 2016, the English Premier League announced that Econet Media acquired free to air broadcasting rights in Sub-Saharan Africa for three seasons, from 2016/17 to 2018/19 season. Econet Media via Kwesé Sports will air the matches, weekly previews and highlights programs. Richard Scudamore, Executive Chairman of the Premier League, said "We are very pleased that Econet Media has chosen to invest in the package of free-to-air broadcasting rights that we have made available in Sub-Saharan Africa."

=== Basketball ===
On 21 April 2016, the NBA and Kwesé Sports owner, Econet Media, announced a multi-year partnership deal in which Econet becomes the official broadcaster of the NBA in Sub-Saharan Africa starting with the 2016–17 season. Econet Media will distribute NBA content in English, French and Portuguese across Sub-Saharan Africa on its internet-, mobile- and satellite-based platforms as well as pay TV platforms and free to air coverage.

=== Mixed martial arts ===
Kwesé Sports acquired exclusive rights to screen the Extreme Fighting Championship (EFC) across Sub-Saharan Africa with the exception of South Africa, which it acquired non-exclusive rights, for three years. Screening commenced on 5 March 2016 with Kwesé Sports offering free live streaming of the EFC 47 event which was held at Carnival City in Johannesburg, South Africa. EFC President Cairo Howarth stated "We believe that Kwesé Sports represents the future of sports broadcasting on the continent and will open many new opportunities to new and existing EFC fans to enjoy quality EFC programming."

=== FIFA Confederations Cup and FIFA World Cup ===
Kwesé Sports secured exclusive free-to-air (FTA) rights to the 2018 FIFA World Cup and the FIFA Confederations Cup 2017. The rights are for sub-Saharan Africa, excluding South Africa. Kwesé will broadcast the tournaments live through its pan-African FTA channel Kwesé Free Sports (KFS). According to the agreement, Kwesé is the only platform on the continent licensed to broadcast live action of these events free.
