= Sky México =

Direct broadcast satellite company

Corporacion Novavision S. DE R.L. DE C.V. T/A Sky México
- Logo used since 2026
- Type: Subsidiary
- Industry: Telecommunication
- Predecessor: DirecTV Mexico
- Founded: 1996; 30 years ago
- Founder: Sky
- Headquarters: Mexico City, Mexico
- Products: Direct broadcast satellite
- Owner: Grupo Televisa
- Website: www.sky.com.mx

Sky México, a trading name of Corporacion Novavision S. DE R.L. DE C.V., is a company that operates a subscription television service in Mexico, Central America and Dominican Republic. It produces TV content, and owns several TV channels. It is one of Mexico's leading pay-TV providers and is owned by Grupo Televisa. As of 2022, Sky Mexico had a 59% share of the subscription TV market.

== History ==
Logo of Sky México from 2003 to 2016

The Mexican company was founded on 25 July 1996, a joint venture between Sky (formerly British Sky Broadcasting), News Corporation (former owner of 20th Century Fox, now known as 20th Century Studios), Liberty Media and Grupo Televisa and was later launched on 15 December 1996. During the course of the decade, most Sky operations in Latin America were rebranded to DirecTV, with the exception of the Mexican and Brazilian operations, which absorbed into DirecTV in 2005 but kept the Sky name.

The merger was approved in October 2004. As a consequence, Televisa's Innova cut its share from 60% to 57% while News Corporation increased its share from 30% to 43%. Both companies were in charge of the 10% divested by Liberty Global. DirecTV was a loss-making operation since the 2002 FIFA World Cup.

The company also operated a magazines division. There were two prints: SkyView and Sky Premiere. As of 2016, it is unknown what happened to the magazines division. It either went out of print or it was sold to another company and then went unlicensed.

In 2024, AT&T divested their 58.7% in Sky Mexico to Televisa, pending regulatory approval which signified a significant consolidation in the Mexican broadcasting market with the move underscoreing Televisa's strategic positioning and dominance in the satellite TV sector, potentially reshaping competition and consumer choices in Mexico's media landscape. Said merger started with the gradual inclusion of events exclusive to Sky Sports on Izzi such as UEFA Euro 2024 and later the adding of such channels to Izzi, on August 15, 2024.

== See also ==
- DirecTV Latin America
- Sky Brasil
