= Radiomundo =

CX 32 Radiomundo
Montevideo; Uruguay
- Frequency: 1170 AM

CX 32 Radiomundo is a Uruguayan Spanish-language AM radio station that broadcasts from Montevideo.

In March 2018, the station was relaunched with a mixture of news, interviews, arts and music.

== Selected programs ==
- En Perspectiva, led by Emiliano Cotelo
