= La Mañana (Uruguay) =

- Type: Daily newspaper
- Owner: Seusa
- Founded: 1914
- Ceased publication: 1998
- Political alignment: Colorado Party
- Headquarters: Montevideo, Uruguay

La Mañana was an influential Uruguayan daily newspaper.

It was established in 1914 by a group of Colorado politicians and journalists, headed by Pedro Manini Ríos. Up to the 1980s it was published by Seusa, the same company owning another important newspaper, El Diario.

It ceased to exist in the late 1990s.

== Reopening ==
As of 26 June 2019, La Mañana reappeared as a weekly newspaper.
