= Radio Centenario =

Radio Centenario (CX36)
- Montevideo; Uruguay
- Frequency: 1250 AM

Programming
- Language: Spanish
- Format: News/talk
- Affiliations: ANDEBU

Ownership
- Owner: CX36 Radio Centenario S.A. — Luis Miravalles, Adriana Acosta Y Gerardo Gazano

History
- Founded: 1 March 1930

Links
- Webcast: Radio Online Uruguay
- Website: 1250 AM

CX 36 Radio Centenario is a Uruguayan Spanish-language AM radio station that broadcasts from Montevideo.

This radio station has a strong leftist political tendency, as it is affiliated with the March 26 Movement which was a founding member of the Broad Front, from which it split off to found the Popular Unity. During Broad Front governments it denounced repeated attempts at discrimination through methods such as denying state advertising funds and electricity services being cut off.

Many cultural and political figures in Uruguayan history worked at or had participation in Radio Centenario, such as Alfredo Zitarrosa, Gastón "Dino" Ciarlo, and José Germán Araujo.
