= Jorge Brovetto =

Uruguayan chemical engineer, academic, and politician (1933–2019)

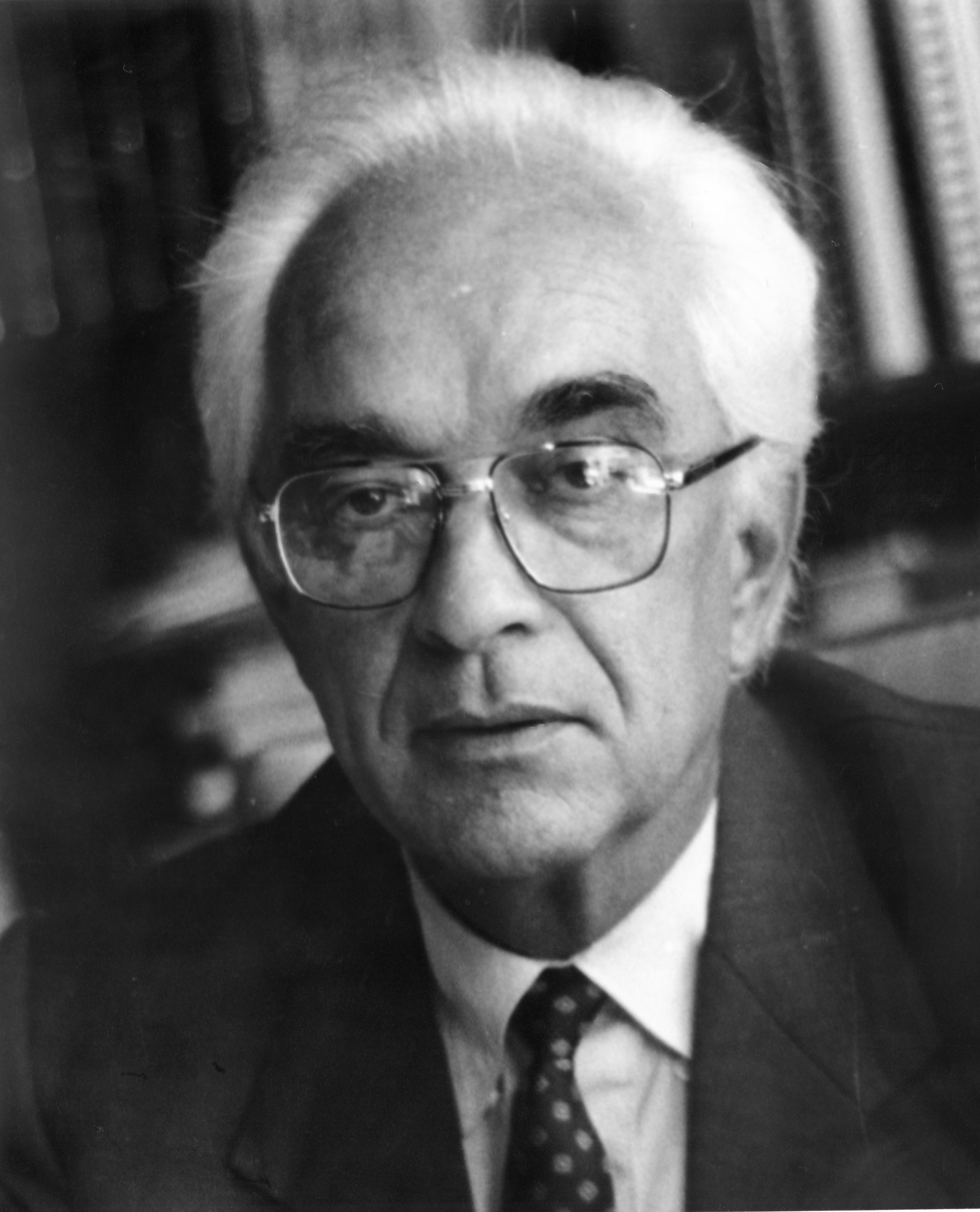
- Jorge Brovetto in 2013.
- Born: Jorge Brovetto Cruz; February 14, 1933; Montevideo, Uruguay
- Died: June 8, 2019 (aged 86); Montevideo, Uruguay
- Education: Universidad de la República
- Occupations: Chemical engineer, politician
- Political party: Broad Front

Jorge Brovetto (14 February 1933 – 8 June 2019) was a Uruguayan chemical engineer, academic and politician.

He successively served as President of the Broad Front, as Rector of the University of the Republic, and as Minister of Education and Culture.
