= Clásica (Uruguayan radio station) =

Radio Clásica (CX6)
Montevideo; Uruguay
- Frequency: 650 kHz
- Branding: Clásica 650 AM

Programming
- Language: Spanish
- Format: Classical music

Ownership
- Owner: Radiodifusión Nacional del Uruguay
- Sister stations: Radio Uruguay, Emisora del Sur, Babel

History
- First air date: April 1, 1930

Technical information
- Class: Public radio
- Power: 100 kW

Links
- Website: Clásica 650 AM

Clásica 650 AM is a state-owned Uruguayan Spanish-language AM radio station that broadcasts from Montevideo.

Its programs are devoted to classical music.
