= San Ramón, Uruguay =

San Ramón
- City & Municipality
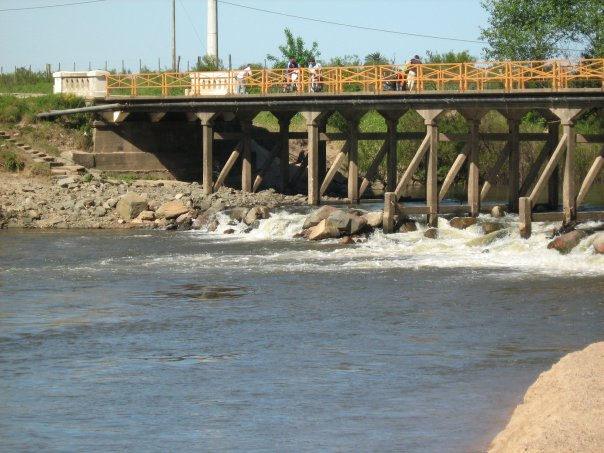
- Santa Lucía River at San Ramón

- Location within Uruguay
- Coordinates: 34°18′0″S 55°57′27″W
- Country: Uruguay
- Department: Canelones
- Founded: 1867
- Elevation: 50 m (160 ft)

Population (2011 Census)
  - Total: 7,133
- Time zone: UTC -3
- Postal code: 90600
- Dial plan: +598 4312 (+4 digits)

San Ramón is a small city in the north of Canelones Department, in southern Uruguay.

San Ramón is also the name of the municipality to which the city belongs.

== Geography ==
It is situated on the south bank of Santa Lucía River, which is the border with Florida Department and south of the hill Cuchilla del Chamizo. The stream Arroyo Pilatos flows 3 kilometres (1.9 mi) south of the city.

=== Location ===
The city is located on the intersection of Route 6 with Route 12 and Route 63, about 79 kilometres (49 mi) north of the centre of Montevideo and 7.5 kilometres (4.7 mi) south of the village Chamizo of Florida Department. The town Tala lies 16 kilometres (9.9 mi) to the east-southeast. The railroad track Montevideo - Melo / Río Branco (to Brazil) passes through the city.

== History ==
San Ramón was founded as a "(village) in 1867, and on 11 July 1910, its status was elevated to "Villa" town (pueblo) by the Act of Ley Nº 3.643. On 26 June 1953, its status was further elevated to "Ciudad" (city) by the Act of Ley Nº 11.952.

== Population ==
In 2011 San Ramón had a population of 7,133. In 2010, the Intendencia de Canelones had estimated a population of 8,123 for the municipality during the elections.

Location map of the Municipality of San Ramón

Year	Population
1908	4,956
1963	5,668
1975	6,594
1985	7,001
1996	6,828
2004	6,992
2011	7,133

Source: Instituto Nacional de Estadística de Uruguay

== Places of worship ==
- St. Raymond Nonnatus Parish Church (Roman Catholic)

== Government ==
The city mayor as of July 2010 is Beatríz Lamas.
