= Sarandí 690 =

CX 8 Radio Sarandí
Montevideo; Uruguay
- Frequency: 690 AM

Programming
- Affiliations: ANDEBU

Ownership
- Owner: Sarandí Comunicaciones S. A.

Technical information
- Licensing authority: FCC

Links
- Public license information: 8 Radio Sarandí Public file; LMS
- Website: 690 AM

CX 8 Radio Sarandí is a Uruguayan Spanish-language AM radio station that broadcasts from Montevideo.

The same group also operates CX 18 Radio Sarandí Sport.

== Selected programs ==
- Las cosas en su sitio
- Informativo Sarandí
- Estrategia Uruguay

== Notable communicators ==
- Carlos Solé, football (1916–1975)
- Eduardo J. Corso, agriculture (1920–2012)
