= 970 Universal =

CX 22 Radio Universal
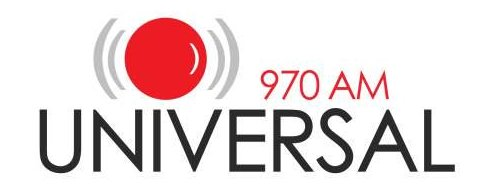

Montevideo; Uruguay
- Frequency: 970 AM

Programming
- Affiliations: ANDEBU

Technical information
- Licensing authority: FCC

Links
- Public license information: 22 Radio Universal Public file; LMS
- Website: 970 AM

CX 22 Radio Universal is a Uruguayan Spanish-language AM radio station that broadcasts from Montevideo.

== Selected programs ==
- Fútbol Universal (football with Alberto Kesman)
- Fuentes confiables (talk show with Aldo Silva)
- La oreja (interviews with Omar Gutiérrez)
- La oral deportiva (sports with Enrique Yannuzzi and Alberto Kesman)
