= RNU2-1 =

Small nuclear RNA in humans

Identifiers
- Aliases: RNU2-1, RNU2, U2, RNA, U2 small nuclear 1
- External IDs: OMIM: 180690; GeneCards: RNU2-1
RNA expression pattern
Bgee	Human / Mouse (ortholog); Top expressed in: sural nerve; Achilles tendon; corpus callosum; bone marrow; subcutaneous adipose tissue; monocyte; testicle; lactiferous gland; muscle of thigh; liver / n/a; More reference expression data
BioGPS	n/a
Orthologs
Databases	NCBI: entry; OMA: entry
Species	Human	Mouse
Entrez	6066	n/a
Ensembl	ENSG00000274585	n/a
UniProt	n a	n/a
RefSeq (mRNA)	n/a	n/a
RefSeq (protein)	n/a	n/a
Location (UCSC)	n/a	n/a
PubMed search		n/a
- Wikidata
View/Edit Human

RNA, U2 small nuclear 1, is a small non-coding RNA that in humans is encoded by the gene RNU2. This RNA is a form of U2 spliceosomal RNA and is involved in mRNA splicing.
