= Emisora del Sur =

Uruguayan radio station

Emisora del Sur (CX38)
- Montevideo; Uruguay
- Frequency: 1290 kHz

Programming
- Language: Spanish

Ownership
- Owner: Radiodifusión Nacional del Uruguay
- Sister stations: Clásica, Radio Uruguay, Babel

Technical information
- Licensing authority: FCC
- Repeater: See RNU repeater list

Links
- Public license information: Public file; LMS
- Website: 1290 AM

Emisora del Sur ("Station of the South") is a state-owned Uruguayan Spanish-language radio station that broadcasts from Montevideo on 1290 AM and 94.7 FM. It airs primarily musical programming with an emphasis on traditional music.

Some Emisora del Sur programming is aired on the RNU repeater network outside of Montevideo.

In December 2008, Emisora del Sur began broadcasting on 94.7 MHz in Montevideo, after the prior concessionaire Berch Rupenian lost the frequency for his Concierto FM and three other stations in Montevideo and Punta del Este over a series of irregularities. One of the Punta del Este frequencies, 94.3 MHz, was also intended to be transferred to SODRE.
