= Sport 890 =

Sport 890 (CX 18)
Montevideo; Uruguay
- Frequency: 890 AM

Programming
- Format: Sports radio
- Affiliations: ANDEBU

Ownership
- Owner: Sarandí Comunicaciones S. A.
- Sister stations: Radio Sarandí

Technical information
- Licensing authority: FCC

Links
- Public license information: 18 Public file; LMS
- Website: 890 AM

Sport 890 is a Uruguayan Spanish-language AM radio station that broadcasts from Montevideo, Uruguay. Sport 890 broadcasts a sports radio format.
