= Radio Carve =

CX 16 Radio Carve
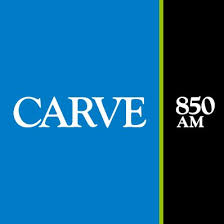

Montevideo; Uruguay
- Broadcast area: Uruguay
- Frequency: 850 AM

Programming
- Format: Talk, Sports
- Affiliations: ANDEBU

Ownership
- Owner: SADREP

History
- First air date: October 12, 1928

Technical information
- Licensing authority: FCC
- Class: Commercial
- Power: 50 KW

Links
- Public license information: 16 Radio Carve Public file; LMS
- Webcast: http://www.carve850.com.uy/#
- Website: 850 AM

CX 16 Radio Carve is a Uruguayan Spanish-language AM radio station that broadcasts from Montevideo.

== History ==
It was founded in 1928 by a German immigrant, Karl Kärbe, who hispanicised his name into Carlos Carve. In honour of the founder, the subsequent owners kept its original name.

== Selected programs ==
- Amaneciendo con el campo (rural news).
- Americando (folklore).
- Fútbol por Carve (football).
- Inicio de jornada (news).
- Informativo Carve (news).
- Valor agregado (rural news).
