= Radio Uruguay =

Uruguayan radio station

Radio Uruguay (CX26)
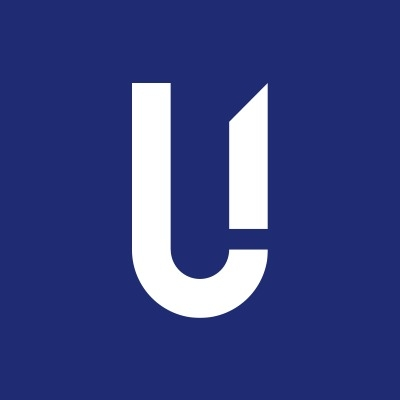
- Radio Uruguay logo

Montevideo; Uruguay
- Frequency: 1050 kHz
- Branding: Uruguay 1050 AM

Programming
- Language: Spanish

Ownership
- Owner: Radiodifusión Nacional del Uruguay
- Sister stations: CX 6, CX 38, Babel

Technical information
- Licensing authority: FCC
- Repeater: See RNU repeater list

Links
- Public license information: Public file; LMS
- Website: 1050 AM

CX 26 SODRE, also known as Radio Uruguay 1050 AM, is a state-owned Uruguayan Spanish-language AM radio station that broadcasts from Montevideo. The station broadcasts primarily talk programming.

Some Radio Uruguay programming is aired on the RNU repeater network outside of Montevideo.
