= El Espectador 810 =

El Espectador
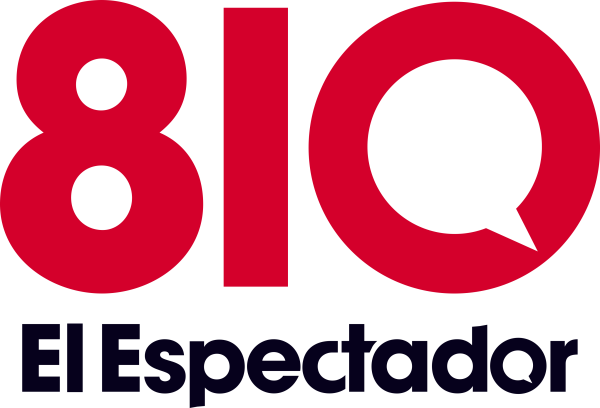

Montevideo; Uruguay
- Frequency: 810 AM

Programming
- Format: Talk
- Affiliations: Uruguayan Broadcasters Association

Ownership
- Owner: Grupo Magnolio

History
- First air date: October 1, 1922
- Former call signs: Radio General Electric
- Former frequencies: CWO

Technical information
- Class: Commercial
- Power: 50 kW

Links
- Website: 810 AM

El Espectador is a Uruguayan radio station, which broadcasts from the city of Montevideo. Its programming is informative and sports. It is considered the first radio station in Uruguay.

In April 2013 an announcement was made regarding the sale of this media company. It was purchased by Magnolio group.

== History ==
In April 1922, the Uruguayan subsidiary of General Electric decided to install a 10-watt power transmitter on the roof of the defunct daily Del Plata, which is how the first regular broadcasts of Radio General Electric began.

As General Electric did not intend to install itself as a broadcasting operator, but as a simple driver of the market, that is why once the test broadcasts end and when the regular broadcasts begin, in 1923, the station changes its name, assuming that of Radio Sud América, its programming would be focused on sports and musical information.

It is in that year that she moved her studies to the then American Methodist College of Ladies at the intersection of Avenida 8 de Octubre and Avenida General Garibaldi.

On May 15, 1931, it changed its name again definitively, changing its name to Radio Espectador, the name of one of the main programs of Radio Sud América, the program: "Radio Diario Espectador". For that year, the newly named Radio El Espectador decided to consolidate itself as a journalistic station and associated its computer services with an international news agency.

With the outbreak of the Second World War, the reporter Esso began to broadcast the computer service, presented by Héctor Amenagual who, through the informational contributions of the United Press International, informed Uruguayans about the most relevant events of said warlike conflict, such as of the taking of Pearl Harbor and the surrender of Japan, of which the station keeps archives. The passing of the war, and the imminent support of Uruguay for the allied side, led to the emergence of anti-Nazi campaigns and editorials in the station, in support of the allied forces.

== See also ==
- Sport 890

== Selected programs ==
- La Mañana de El Espectador (morning show with Daniel Castro)
- Rompkbzas (Variety with Daniel Figares)
- Suena Tremendo (Variety with Diego Zas and Juanchi Hounie)
- 13 a 0 (Sports with Ricardo Piñeyrúa)
- 810 VIVO (News with Juan Sader)
- Dinámica rural (Rural news)
- La venganza será terrible (Humor with Alejandro Dolina)
- Segundo Intento (Music with Felipe Reyes)
