= Radio María Uruguay =

Radio María Uruguay (CX28)
Montevideo; Uruguay
- Frequency: 1090 kHz

Programming
- Format: Catholic radio
- Affiliations: The World Family of Radio Maria

Ownership
- Owner: FADITUR S.A.

Links
- Webcast: Listen Live
- Website: radiomaria.org.uy

Radio María Uruguay, also known as CX28, is a radio station in Montevideo, in Uruguay. The station is owned and operated by FADITUR S.A. and broadcasts Catholic radio programming as an affiliate of The World Family of Radio Maria.

The station had previously been Radio Imparcial, a talk outlet. However, in 2018, it was sold by owner Sucesión Walfrido Figueira Morán S.R.L., prompting the end of its programs. The sale attracted questions about violations of Uruguay's broadcasting law, as the number of stations owned, if considered as one group, would have been impermissible.

== Other Radio María stations ==
Radio María Uruguay is also heard on the following stations:

City	Frequency	Call sign
San José	103.3 MHz	CX277
Melo	1470 kHz	CW147
Florida	104.5 MHz	CX283A
Tacuarembó	104.5 MHz	CX283
Artigas	95.9 MHz	

== See also ==
- Catholic Media Network
- Radio Maria
