= ¿Quién es la máscara? (Uruguayan TV series) season 4 =

¿Quién es la máscara?
- Season 4
- Hosted by: Maximiliano de la Cruz
- Judges: Fabián Delgado; Sofía Rodríguez; Patricia Wolf; Pablo Turturiello
- Winner: Claudia Fernández as "Sapa"
- Runner-up: Sole Ramirez as "Muñeca de Terror"
- No. of episodes: 10

Release
- Original network: Teledoce
- Original release: 17 June – 19 August 2024

Season chronology
- ← Previous; Season 3

The fourth season of ¿Quién es la máscara? premiered on June 17, 2024 and lasted for 10 episodes. On August 19, Sapa (actress Claudia Fernández) was declared the winner, and Muñeca de Terror (singer Sole Ramírez) the runner-up.

== Panelists and host ==
Of the four panelists that participated in the previous season, singer-songwriter Fabián Delgado, journalist and host Sofía Rodríguez, and model and actress Patricia Wolf returned. Actor and singer Pablo Turturiello replaced Fer Vázquez as one of the panelists. Actor and comedian Maximiliano de la Cruz returns as host.

== Contestants ==
| Stage name | Celebrity | Occupation | Episodes | | | | | | | | | |
| Stage name | Celebrity | Occupation | 1 | 2 | 3 | 4 | 5 | 6 | 7 | 8 | 9 | 10 |
|---|---|---|---|---|---|---|---|---|---|---|---|---|
| Sapa (Toad) (WC) | Claudia Fernández | Actress | | | WIN | | | WIN | WIN | WIN | WIN | WINNER |
| Muñeca de Terror (Horror Doll) | Sole Ramírez | Singer | WIN | | | | WIN | | WIN | RISK | WIN | RUNNER-UP |
| Cono (Cone) | Frankie Lampariello | Singer | WIN | | | RISK | | | RISK | WIN | WIN | THIRD |
| Tucán (Toucan) | Paola Bianco | Actress | | RISK | WIN | WIN | | RISK | | | OUT | |
| Choclo (Corn) | Andy Vila | Actress | RISK | | | | WIN | WIN | WIN | WIN | OUT | |
| Hamburguesa (Hamburger) (WC) | Adriana da Silva | Actress | | | WIN | WIN | RISK | WIN | | OUT | | |
| Vikingo (Viking) | Álvaro Gutiérrez | Former Footballer | | WIN | | WIN | WIN | | OUT | | | |
| El Gato y El Ratón (The Cat and The Mouse) | Pedro Alfonso | Actors | WIN | WIN | | | | OUT | | | | |
| El Gato y El Ratón (The Cat and The Mouse) | Paula Chavez | Actors | WIN | WIN | | | | OUT | | | | |
| Cachorro (Dog) (WC) | Sebastián Abreu | Former Footballer | | | | | OUT | | | | | |
| Niño Monstruo (Monster Boy) (WC) | Gabriel Goity | Actor | | | RISK | OUT | | | | | | |
| Hamster | Pablo Granados | Actor | | WIN | OUT | | | | | | | |
| Calcetines (Socks) | Alberto Kesman | Journalist | | OUT | | | | | | | | |
| Gallo (Rooster) | José Luis Rodríguez | Singer | OUT | | | | | | | | | |

The masked singer won its face-off and remained in the competition.
The masked singer lost its face-off, but was not eliminated.
The masked singer was eliminated from the competition and unmasked upon elimination.
The masked singer was saved from elimination.
The masked singer did not perform in this episode.

== Episodes ==
=== Week 1 (17 June) ===
Performances on the first episode
| # | Stage name | Song | Identity | Result |
|---|---|---|---|---|
| 1 | Cat and Mouse | "Yo te diré" by Miranda! | undisclosed | WIN |
| 2 | Corn | "Shallow" by Bradley Cooper and Lady Gaga | undisclosed | RISK |
| 3 | Rooster | "Contigo" by Joaquín Sabina | José Luis Rodríguez | OUT |
| 4 | Cone | "Que Tiene La Noche" by Sonido Caracol | undisclosed | WIN |
| 5 | Horror Doll | "Hasta La Raiz" by Natalia Lafourcade | undisclosed | WIN |

=== Week 2 (24 June) ===
Performances on the second episode
| # | Stage name | Song | Identity | Result |
|---|---|---|---|---|
| 1 | Socks | "La Morocha" by BM & Luck Ra | Alberto Kesman | OUT |
| 2 | Hamster | "Volverte a Ver" by Juanes | undisclosed | WIN |
| 3 | Cat and Mouse | "No me importa el dinero" by Los Auténticos Decadentes | undisclosed | WIN |
| 4 | Toucan | "No estamos lokos" by Ketama | undisclosed | RISK |
| 5 | Viking | "La Bifurcada" by Memphis La Blusera | undisclosed | WIN |

=== Week 3 (2 July) ===
Performances on the third episode
| # | Stage name | Song | Identity | Result |
|---|---|---|---|---|
| 1 | Toad | "Arrasando" by Thalía | undisclosed | WIN |
| 2 | Monster Boy | "La Puerta" by Luis Miguel | undisclosed | RISK |
| 3 | Hamburger | "Rolling In The Deep" by Adele | undisclosed | WIN |
| 4 | Toucan | "Fue Amor" by Fito Páez | undisclosed | WIN |
| 5 | Hamster | "No voy en tren" by Charly García | Pablo Granados | OUT |

=== Week 4 (5 July) ===
Performances on the fourth episode
| # | Stage name | Song | Identity | Result |
|---|---|---|---|---|
| 1 | Toucan | "Ven Conmigo (Solamente Tu)" by Christina Aguilera | undisclosed | WIN |
| 2 | Monster Boy | "Dueño de Nada" by José Luis Rodríguez | Gabriel Goity | OUT |
| 3 | Hamburger | "Houdini" by Dua Lipa | undisclosed | WIN |
| 4 | Viking | "Mi historia entre tus dedos" by Gianluca Grignani | undisclosed | WIN |
| 5 | Cone | "Basket Case" by Green Day | undisclosed | RISK |

=== Week 5 (15 July) ===
Performances on the fifth episode
| # | Stage name | Song | Identity | Result |
|---|---|---|---|---|
| 1 | Corn | "Como La Flor" by Selena | undisclosed | WIN |
| 2 | Hamburger | "I Knew You Were Trouble" by Taylor Swift | undisclosed | RISK |
| 3 | Dog | "Tu Cariñito" by Dominix & Puerto Rican Power | Sebastián Abreu | OUT |
| 4 | Horror Doll | "Para Siempre" by Benjamín Amadeo | undisclosed | WIN |
| 5 | Viking | "Donde Quiera Que Estes" by Selena | undisclosed | WIN |

=== Week 6 (22 July) ===
Performances on the sixth episode
| # | Stage name | Song | Identity | Result |
|---|---|---|---|---|
| 1 | Corn | "O canto da Cidade" by Daniela Mercury | undisclosed | WIN |
| 2 | Cat and Mouse | "Nena" by Marama | Pedro Alfonso | OUT |
| 2 | Cat and Mouse | "Nena" by Marama | Paula Chavez | OUT |
| 3 | Hamburger | "Sweet Dreams (Are Made of This)" by Eurythmics | undisclosed | WIN |
| 4 | Toucan | "Sin Documentos" by Los Rodríguez | undisclosed | RISK |
| 5 | Toad | "Me Muero de Amor" by Natalia Oreiro | undisclosed | WIN |

=== Week 7 (29 July) ===
Performances on the seventh episode
| # | Stage name | Song | Identity | Result |
|---|---|---|---|---|
| 1 | Cone | "Dejame Intentar" by Carlos Mata | undisclosed | RISK |
| 2 | Toad | "La Araña" by J Mena | undisclosed | WIN |
| 3 | Viking | "Wicked Game" by Chris Isaak | Álvaro Gutiérrez | OUT |
| 4 | Corn | "Después De Ti" by Alejandro Lerner | undisclosed | WIN |
| 5 | Horror Doll | "Oh! Darling" by The Beatles | undisclosed | WIN |

=== Week 8 (5 August) ===
Performances on the eighth episode
| # | Stage name | Song | Identity | Result |
|---|---|---|---|---|
| 1 | Hamburger | "Man! I Feel Like A Woman" by Shania Twain | Adriana da Silva | OUT |
| 2 | Toad | "Algo Tiene" by Natalie Pérez | undisclosed | WIN |
| 3 | Cone | "Don't Stop Me Now" by Queen | undisclosed | WIN |
| 4 | Corn | "El Hombre Del Piano" by Ana Belén | undisclosed | WIN |
| 5 | Horror Doll | "Love On The Brain" by Rihanna | undisclosed | RISK |

=== Week 9 (12 August) ===
Performances on the ninth episode
| # | Stage name | Song | Identity | Result |
|---|---|---|---|---|
| 1 | Cone | "¿Quieres Ser Mi Amante?" by Camilo Sesto | undisclosed | WIN |
| 2 | Corn | "Bzrp Music Sessions #51" by Villano Antillano & Bizarrap | Andy Vila | OUT |
| 3 | Toad | "Mary Poppins Y El Deshollinador" by Fabiana Cantilo | undisclosed | WIN |
| 4 | Horror Doll | "Cambio Dolor" by Natalia Oreiro | undisclosed | WIN |
| 5 | Toucan | "Disciplina" by Lali Espósito | Paola Bianco | OUT |

=== Week 10 (19 August) - Finale ===
Performances on the tenth episode
| # | Stage name | Song | Identity | Result |
Round 1
| 1 | Toad | "Paisaje" by Gilda | undisclosed | SAFE |
| 2 | Cone | "Nessun Dorma" by Giacomo Puccini | Frankie Lampariello | THIRD |
| 2 | Cone | "Bamboléo" by Gipsy Kings | Frankie Lampariello | THIRD |
| 3 | Horror Doll | "ARRANCÁRMELO" by WOS | undisclosed | SAFE |
Round 2
| 1 | Horror Doll | "I Will Always Love You" by Whitney Houston | Sole Ramírez | RUNNER-UP |
| 2 | Toad | "Te Aviso, Te Anuncio" by Shakira | Claudia Fernández | WINNER |
