= ¿Quién es la máscara? (Uruguayan TV series) season 1 =

¿Quién es la máscara?
- Season 1
- Hosted by: Maximiliano de la Cruz
- Judges: Emir Abdul; Fabián Delgado; Sofía Rodríguez; Patricia Wolf
- Winner: Manuela da Silveira as "Monstruo"
- Runner-up: Maria Jose Alvarez as "Gata Espejada"
- No. of episodes: 16

Release
- Original network: Teledoce
- Original release: 5 May – 18 August 2022

Season chronology
- Next → Season 2

The first season of ¿Quién es la máscara? premiered on May 5, 2022, and lasted for 16 episodes. On August 18, Monstruo (actress Manuela da Silveira) was declared the winner, and Gata Espejada (singer Maria Jose Alvarez) the runner-up.

== Panelists and host ==
The judging panel consists of dancer Emir Abdul Gani, singer-songwriter Fabián Delgado, journalist and host Sofía Rodríguez, and model and actress Patricia Wolf. Actor and comedian Maximiliano de la Cruz hosted the show.

Throughout the season, various guest panelists appeared as the fifth judge in the judging panel for one episode. These guest panelists included choreographer Martin Inthamoussú (episode 9) and actress Catalina Ferrand (episode 10).

== Contestants ==
| Stage name | Celebrity | Occupation | Episodes | | | | | | | | | | | | | | | |
| Stage name | Celebrity | Occupation | 1 | 2 | 3 | 4 | 5 | 6 | 7 | 8 | 9 | 10 | 11 | 12 | 13 | 14 | 15 | 16 |
|---|---|---|---|---|---|---|---|---|---|---|---|---|---|---|---|---|---|---|
| Monstruo (Monster) | Manuela da Silveira | Actress | RISK | | | | WIN | | RISK | | WIN | | | RISK | WIN | RISK | WIN | WINNER |
| Gata Espejada (Mirrored Cat) | Maria Jose Alvarez | Singer | WIN | | | | | WIN | | WIN | | WIN | WIN | | WIN | WIN | WIN | RUNNER-UP |
| Astronauta (Astronaut) | Fer Vázquez | Singer | RISK | | | | | WIN | WIN | | WIN | | RISK | | RISK | WIN | RISK | THIRD |
| Popcorn | Lucía Rodríguez | Comedian | | | RISK | | RISK | | | WIN | | WIN | | WIN | RISK | WIN | OUT | |
| Ultratón | Gerardo Nieto | Singer | | WIN | | WIN | | | WIN | | RISK | | WIN | | WIN | OUT | | |
| Hueva (Egg) | Silvia Novarese | Actress | | RISK | | RISK | | | | WIN | WIN | | | WIN | OUT | | | |
| Cactus | Valeria Ripoll | Politician | | WIN | | | WIN | | RISK | | | RISK | | OUT | | | | |
| Tero | Juan Ramón Carrasco | Football coach | | WIN | | | WIN | | | RISK | | WIN | OUT | | | | | |
| Catrina | Victoria Rodríguez | Presenter | | | WIN | WIN | | | | RISK | | OUT | | | | | | |
| Tiburón (Shark) | Hatila Passos | Basketball player | | | WIN | WIN | | | WIN | | OUT | | | | | | | |
| Rhino | Ricardo Alarcón | Businessman | | | WIN | | | WIN | | OUT | | | | | | | | |
| Piggy Pop | Déborah Rodríguez | Runner/Model | WIN | | | | | RISK | OUT | | | | | | | | | |
| Burro (Donkey) | Miguel Ángel Rodríguez | Actor | | RISK | | | | OUT | | | | | | | | | | |
| Sapo (Toad) | Pichu Straneo | Actor | | | RISK | | OUT | | | | | | | | | | | |
| Helado (Ice Cream) | China Suárez | Actress | WIN | | | OUT | | | | | | | | | | | | |
| Pingüino (Penguin) | Cristian Rodríguez | Footballer | | | OUT | | | | | | | | | | | | | |
| Máquina de Dulces (Candy Machine) | Arturo Valls | Actor | | OUT | | | | | | | | | | | | | | |
| Beagle | Cristian Castro | Singer | OUT | | | | | | | | | | | | | | | |

The masked singer won its face-off and remained in the competition.
The masked singer lost its face-off, but was not eliminated.
The masked singer was eliminated from the competition and unmasked upon elimination.
The masked singer was saved from elimination.
The masked singer did not perform in this episode.

== Episodes ==
=== Week 1 (5 May) ===
Performances on the first episode
| # | Stag name | Song | Identity | Result |
|---|---|---|---|---|
| 1 | Monster | "What's Up?" by 4 Non Blondes | undisclosed | RISK |
| 2 | Ice Cream | "Libre Soy" from Frozen | undisclosed | WIN |
| 3 | Piggy Pop | "I Want To Break Free" by Queen | undisclosed | WIN |
| 4 | Beagle | "Pa'l Que Se Va" by Alfredo Zitarrosa | Cristian Castro | OUT |
| 5 | Astronaut | "24K Magic" by Bruno Mars | undisclosed | RISK |
| 6 | Mirrored Cat | "Todos me Miran" by Gloria Trevi | undisclosed | WIN |

=== Week 2 (12 May) ===
Performances on the second episode
| # | Stag name | Song | Identity | Result |
|---|---|---|---|---|
| 1 | Cactus | "Miénteme" by Tini ft. María Becerra | undisclosed | WIN |
| 2 | Candy Machine | "Tacones Rojos" by Sebastián Yatra | Arturo Valls | OUT |
| 3 | Tero | "Costumbres Argentinas" by Los Abuelos de la Nada | undisclosed | WIN |
| 4 | Donkey | "Cha-Cha Muchacha" by Ruben Rada | undisclosed | RISK |
| 5 | Egg | "No Era Cierto" by No Te Va Gustar | undisclosed | RISK |
| 6 | Ultratón | "O Sole Mio" by Alfredo Mazzucchi and Eduardo di Capua | undisclosed | WIN |

=== Week 3 (19 May) ===
Performances on the third episode
| # | Stag name | Song | Identity | Result |
|---|---|---|---|---|
| 1 | Popcorn | "Mamma Mia" by ABBA | undisclosed | RISK |
| 2 | Shark | "Hawái" by Maluma | undisclosed | WIN |
| 3 | Toad | "Un Beso Y Una Flor" by Nino Bravo | undisclosed | RISK |
| 4 | Rhino | "La Bilirrubina" by Juan Luis Guerra | undisclosed | WIN |
| 5 | Penguin | "Corazón" by Los Autenticos Decadentes | Cristian Rodríguez | OUT |
| 6 | Catrina | "Me Haces Bien" by Jorge Drexler | undisclosed | WIN |

=== Week 4 (26 May) ===
Performances on the fourth episode
| # | Stag name | Song | Identity | Result |
|---|---|---|---|---|
| 1 | Egg | "Mariposa Tecknicolor" by Fito Páez | undisclosed | RISK |
| 2 | Shark | "Don't Worry, Be Happy" by Bobby McFerrin | undisclosed | WIN |
| 3 | Ultratón | "Vivir Así es Morir de Amor" by Camilo Sesto | undisclosed | WIN |
| 4 | Ice Cream | "Let it Be" by The Beatles | China Suárez | OUT |
| 5 | Catrina | "Je veux" by Zaz | undisclosed | WIN |

=== Week 5 (2 June) ===
Performances on the fifth episode
| # | Stag name | Song | Identity | Result |
|---|---|---|---|---|
| 1 | Cactus | "¿A quién le importa?" by Alaska y Dinarama | undisclosed | WIN |
| 2 | Toad | "La Cosa Más Bella" by Eros Ramazzotti | Pichu Straneo | OUT |
| 3 | Tero | "Flaca" by Andrés Calamaro | undisclosed | WIN |
| 4 | Monster | "La Bicicleta" by Carlos Vives & Shakira | undisclosed | WIN |
| 5 | Popcorn | "Paisaje" by Gilda | undisclosed | RISK |

=== Week 6 (9 June) ===
Performances on the sixth episode
| # | Stag name | Song | Identity | Result |
|---|---|---|---|---|
| 1 | Astronaut | "De Música Ligera" by Soda Stereo | undisclosed | WIN |
| 2 | Mirrored Cat | "Garganta Con Arena" by Cacho Castana | undisclosed | WIN |
| 3 | Donkey | "Resistire" by Duo Dinamico | Miguel Ángel Rodríguez | OUT |
| 4 | Rhino | "Muriendo De Plenda" by Ruben Rada | undisclosed | WIN |
| 5 | Piggy Pop | "Spending My Time" by Roxette | undisclosed | RISK |

=== Week 7 (16 June) ===
Performances on the seventh episode
| # | Stag name | Song | Identity | Result |
|---|---|---|---|---|
| 1 | Shark | "What a Wonderful World" by Louis Armstrong | undisclosed | WIN |
| 2 | Piggy Pop | "Pizza Muzzarella" by Los Fatales | Déborah Rodríguez | OUT |
| 3 | Monster | "Me Voy" by Julieta Venegas | undisclosed | RISK |
| 4 | Ultratón | "Robarte un Beso" by Carlos Vives & Sebastián Yatra | undisclosed | WIN |
| 5 | Cactus | "Vuela, Vuela" by Magneto | undisclosed | RISK |
| 6 | Astronaut | "Bailando" by Enrique Iglesias | undisclosed | WIN |

=== Week 8 (23 June) ===
Performances on the eighth episode
| # | Stag name | Song | Identity | Result |
|---|---|---|---|---|
| 1 | Egg | "Inevitable" by Shakira | undisclosed | WIN |
| 2 | Rhino | "Loco (Tu forma de ser)" by Los Auténticos Decadentes | Ricardo Alarcón | OUT |
| 3 | Popcorn | "It's A Beautiful Day" by Michael Bublé | undisclosed | WIN |
| 4 | Catrina | "Candombe de la Aduana" by Niquel | undisclosed | RISK |
| 5 | Mirrored Cat | "El Tailsmán" by Rosana | undisclosed | WIN |
| 6 | Tero | "Yo Me Estoy Enamorando" by Antonio Ríos | undisclosed | RISK |

=== Week 9 (30 June) ===
Performances on the ninth episode
| # | Stage name | Song | Identity | Result |
|---|---|---|---|---|
| 1 | Astronaut | "Ai Se Eu Te Pego" by Michel Teló | undisclosed | WIN |
| 2 | Shark | "Velha Infância" by Tribalistas | Hatila Passos | OUT |
| 3 | Monster | "Desesperada" by Marta Sánchez | undisclosed | WIN |
| 4 | Ultratón | "El Viejo" by La Vela Puerca | undisclosed | RISK |
| 5 | Egg | "Fiesta" by Raffaella Carrà | undisclosed | WIN |

=== Week 10 (7 July) ===
Performances on the tenth episode
| # | Stage name | Song | Identity | Result |
|---|---|---|---|---|
| 1 | Cactus | "Despacito" by Luis Fonsi ft. Daddy Yankee | undisclosed | RISK |
| 2 | Popcorn | "KESI" by Camilo | undisclosed | WIN |
| 3 | Tero | "Nada fue un Error" by Coti | undisclosed | WIN |
| 4 | Catrina | "¡Corre!" by Jesse & Joy | Victoria Rodríguez | OUT |
| 5 | Mirrored Cat | "Mi enfermedad" by Los Rodríguez | undisclosed | WIN |

=== Week 11 (14 July) ===
- Guest performance: "Tusa" by Karol G and Nicki Minaj performed by Unicorn

Performances on the eleventh episode
| # | Stage name | Song | Identity | Result |
|---|---|---|---|---|
| 1 | Tero | "La Fuerza del Engaño" by Marcela Morelo | Juan Ramón Carrasco | OUT |
| 2 | Mirrored Cat | "Ji Ji Ji" by Redonditos de Ricota | undisclosed | WIN |
| 3 | Astronaut | "Bicho Bicho" by Los Fatales | undisclosed | RISK |
| 4 | Ultratón | "Sin Principo Ni Final" by Abel Pintos | undisclosed | WIN |

=== Week 12 (21 July) ===
- Guest performance: "Solo Se Vive Una Vez" by Azúcar Moreno performed by Disco Ball

Performances on the twelfth episode
| # | Stage Name | Song | Identity | Result |
|---|---|---|---|---|
| 1 | Popcorn | "Malo" by Bebe | undisclosed | WIN |
| 2 | Monster | "La Isla Bonita" by Madonna | undisclosed | RISK |
| 3 | Egg | "Y Nos Dieron Las Diez" by Joaquín Sabina | undisclosed | WIN |
| 4 | Cactus | "A Rodar Mi Vida" by Fito Páez | Valeria Ripoll | OUT |

=== Week 13 (28 July) ===
Performances on the thirteenth episode
| # | Stage name | Song | Identity | Result |
|---|---|---|---|---|
| 1 | Astronaut | "Sugar" by Maroon 5 | undisclosed | RISK |
| 2 | Monster | "...Baby One More Time" by Britney Spears | undisclosed | WIN |
| 3 | Popcorn | "A Don Ata" by Soledad | undisclosed | RISK |
| 4 | Ultratón | "Corazón Partío" by Alejandro Sanz | undisclosed | WIN |
| 5 | Mirrored Cat | "Como Olvidarla" by Rodrigo | undisclosed | WIN |
| 6 | Egg | "Loquita" by Márama | Silvia Novarese | OUT |

=== Week 14 (4 August) ===
- Guest performance: "Don't You Remember" by Adele performed by Karina la Princesita as "Unicorn"

Performances on the fourteenth episode
| # | Stage name | Song | Identity | Result |
|---|---|---|---|---|
| 1 | Astronaut | "Vivir Mi Vida" by Marc Anthony | undisclosed | WIN |
| 2 | Popcorn | "À Primera Vista" by Chico César | undisclosed | WIN |
| 3 | Monster | "Shake It Off" by Taylor Swift | undisclosed | RISK |
| 4 | Ultratón | "Yo no Me Quiero Casar" by Turf | Gerardo Nieto | OUT |
| 5 | Mirrored Cat | "La Quiero a Morir" by DLG | undisclosed | WIN |

=== Week 15 (11 August) ===
- Guest performance: "Noche de Rock" by Trotsky Vengarán performed by Celso Cuadro as "Disco Ball"

Performances on the fifteenth episode
| # | Stage name | Song | Identity | Result |
|---|---|---|---|---|
| 1 | Mirrored Cat | "La Cobra" by Jimena Barón | undisclosed | WIN |
| 2 | Popcorn | "Que Le Den Candela" by Celia Cruz | Lucía Rodríguez | OUT |
| 3 | Monster | "Yo Contigo, Tú Conmigo" by Morat & Álvaro Soler | undisclosed | WIN |
| 4 | Astronaut | "Get Lucky" by Daft Punk ft. Pharrell Williams | undisclosed | RISK |

=== Week 16 (18 August) - Finale ===
Performances on the sixteenth episode
| # | Stage name | Song | Identity | Result |
Round 1
| 1 | Monster | "I Love Rock 'n' Roll" by Joan Jett & the Blackhearts | undisclosed | SAFE |
| 2 | Mirrored Cat | "Ojos Así" by Shakira | undisclosed | SAFE |
| 3 | Astronaut | "Candle in the Wind" by Elton John | Fer Vázquez | THIRD |
| 3 | Astronaut | "Taki Taki" by DJ Snake feat. Selena Gomez, Ozuna and Cardi B | Fer Vázquez | THIRD |
Round 2
| 1 | Monster | "Happy" by Pharrell Williams | Manuela da Silveira | WINNER |
| 2 | Mirrored Cat | "Un Mundo Ideal" by Ricardo Montaner & Michelle | Maria Jose Alvarez | RUNNER-UP |
