= ¿Quién es la máscara? (Uruguayan TV series) season 3 =

¿Quién es la máscara?
- Season 3
- Hosted by: Maximiliano de la Cruz
- Judges: Fabián Delgado; Sofía Rodríguez; Patricia Wolf; Fer Vázquez
- Winner: Luana as "Tigresa"
- Runner-up: Freddy "Zurdo" Bessio as "Calavera"
- No. of episodes: 10

Release
- Original network: Teledoce
- Original release: 22 June – 31 August 2023

Season chronology
- ← Previous; Season 2 Next → Season 4

The third season of ¿Quién es la máscara? premiered on June 22, 2023 and lasted for 11 episodes. On August 31, Tigresa (singer Luana) was declared the winner, and Calavera (singer Freddy "Zurdo" Bessio) the runner-up.

== Panelists and host ==
The judging panel from last season consists of dancer Emir Abdul Gani, singer-songwriter Fabián Delgado, journalist and host Sofía Rodríguez, and model and actress Patricia Wolf. Actor and comedian Maximiliano de la Cruz made a return. Singer and songwriter Fer Vázquez replaced Emir Abdul as one of the panelists.

== Contestants ==
Stage name	Celebrity	Occupation	Episodes									
Stage name	Celebrity	Occupation	1	2	3	4	5	6	7	8	9	10
Tigresa (Tigress)	Luana	Singer	WIN			WIN		WIN	WIN	WIN	WIN	WINNER
Calavera (Skull)	Freddy "Zurdo" Bessio	Singer	WIN		WIN				WIN	WIN	RISK	RUNNER-UP
Brócoli (Broccoli)	Christian Font	Journalist		WIN			WIN	RISK	RISK	RISK	WIN	THIRD
Alien	Natalie Pérez	Singer	RISK		WIN			WIN		WIN	OUT	
Palta (Avocado)	Catalina Ferrand	TV host		WIN	RISK	WIN	WIN		WIN	OUT		
Car Wash (WC)	Raúl "El Flaco" Castro	Singer			WIN	RISK	WIN	WIN	OUT			
Baby Dino	Daniel K	Magician		WIN			RISK	OUT				
Hombre Hielo (Ice Man)	Gastón "Tonga" Reyno	MMA fighter	WIN			WIN	OUT					
Mamushka	Zaira Nara	Model		RISK		OUT						
Abuelo Monstruo (Grandpa Monster) (WC)	Jorge Fucile	Former footballer			OUT							
Gorila (Gorilla)	La Mona Jiménez	Singer		OUT								
Camaleón (Chameleon)	Itziar Ituño	Actress	OUT									

The masked singer won its face-off and remained in the competition.
The masked singer lost its face-off, but was not eliminated.
The masked singer was eliminated from the competition and unmasked upon elimination.
The masked singer was saved from elimination.
The masked singer did not perform in this episode.

== Episodes ==
=== Week 1 (22 June) ===
Performances on the first episode
#	Stage name	Song	Identity	Result
1	Chameleon	"Flowers" by Miley Cyrus	Itziar Ituño	OUT
2	Skull	"Torero" by Chayanne	undisclosed	WIN
3	Ice Man	"Nos Dijimos Todo" by Once Tiros	undisclosed	WIN
4	Alien	"Nada Es Para Siempre" by Luis Fonsi	undisclosed	RISK
5	Tigress	"En La Intimidad" by Emilia	undisclosed	WIN

=== Week 2 (29 June) ===
Performances on the second episode
#	Stage name	Song	Identity	Result
1	Avocado	"Quevedo: Bzrp Music Sessions, Vol. 52" by Bizarrap & Quevedo	undisclosed	WIN
2	Gorilla	"Suavemente" by Elvis Crespo	La Mona Jiménez	OUT
3	Broccoli	"Highway to Hell" by AC/DC	undisclosed	WIN
4	Mamushka	"Fuiste" by Gilda	undisclosed	RISK
5	Baby Dino	"Moves Like Jagger" by Maroon 5 ft. Christina Aguilera	undisclosed	WIN

=== Week 3 (6 July) ===
Performances on the third episode
#	Stage name	Song	Identity	Result
1	Grandpa Monster	"5 Minutos" by Lucas Sugo	Jorge Fucile	OUT
2	Car Wash	"Bajo El Mar" from La Sirenita	undisclosed	WIN
3	Skull	"Basta De Llamarme Así" by Vicentico	undisclosed	WIN
4	Avocado	"The Ketchup Song (Aserejé)" by Las Ketchup	undisclosed	RISK
5	Alien	"Despechá" by Rosalía	undisclosed	WIN

=== Week 4 (13 July) ===
Performances on the fourth episode
#	Stage name	Song	Identity	Result
1	Car Wash	"Toca Buitres" by Buitres	undisclosed	RISK
2	Avocado	"Ella" by Bebe	undisclosed	WIN
3	Mamushka	"Que Digan Lo Que Quieran" by Natalia Oreiro	Zaira Nara	OUT
4	Tigress	"El Poeta Dice La Verdad" by La Trampa	undisclosed	WIN
5	Ice Man	"Azul" by Cristian Castro	undisclosed	WIN

=== Week 5 (20 July) ===
Performances on the fifth episode
#	Stage name	Song	Identity	Result
1	Avocado	"Loco Un Poco" by Turf	undisclosed	WIN
2	Baby Dino	"Vida de Rico" by Camilo	undisclosed	RISK
3	Car Wash	"Mil Horas" by Los Abuelos de la Nada	undisclosed	WIN
4	Broccoli	"Rezo Por Vos" by Charly García	undisclosed	WIN
5	Ice Man	"Bulería" by David Bisbal	Gastón "Tonga" Reyno	OUT

=== Week 6 (27 July) ===
Performances on the sixth episode
#	Stage name	Song	Identity	Result
1	Alien	"El amor después del amor" by Fito Páez	undisclosed	WIN
2	Broccoli	"Hey Jude" by The Beatles	undisclosed	RISK
3	Car Wash	"Pégate" by Ricky Martin	undisclosed	WIN
4	Tigress	"Equivocada" by Thalía	undisclosed	WIN
5	Baby Dino	"Ciudad Mágica" by Tan Biónica	Daniel K	OUT

=== Week 7 (3 August) ===
Performances on the seventh episode
#	Stage name	Song	Identity	Result
1	Tigress	"Guapas" by Bandana	undisclosed	WIN
2	Broccoli	"The Real Slim Shady" by Eminem	undisclosed	RISK
3	Skull	"Recuérdame" from Coco	undisclosed	WIN
4	Avocado	"Tu Calorro" by Estopa	undisclosed	WIN
5	Car Wash	"19 Dias Y 500 Noches" by Joaquín Sabina	Raul "El Flaco" Castro	OUT

=== Week 8 (10 August) ===
Performances on the eighth episode
#	Stage name	Song	Identity	Result
1	Tigress	"Back to Black" by Amy Winehouse	undisclosed	WIN
2	Broccoli	"Mujer Amante" by Rata Blanca	undisclosed	RISK
3	Avocado	"Mayonesa" by Chocolate	Catalina Ferrand	OUT
4	Alien	"Tu Veneno" by Natalia Oreiro	undisclosed	WIN
5	Skull	"Ven, Devórame Otra Vez" by Azúcar Moreno	undisclosed	WIN

=== Week 9 (17 August) ===
- Guest Performance: "Será Que No Me Amas" by Luis Miguel performed by Camila Rajchman as Seahorse

Performances on the ninth episode
#	Stage name	Song	Identity	Result
1	Alien	"Monotonía" by Ozuna & Shakira	Natalie Pérez	OUT
2	Tigress	"Boomerang" by Lali Espósito	undisclosed	WIN
3	Skull	"En Mi Corazón Vivirás" by Phil Collins	undisclosed	RISK
4	Broccoli	"Hakuna Matata" from El Rey León	undisclosed	WIN

=== Week 10 (31 August) - Finale ===
Performances on the tenth episode
#	Stage name	Song	Identity	Result
Round 1
1	Broccoli	"The Greatest Show" from The Greatest Showman	Christian Font	THIRD
1	Broccoli	"DANCE CRIP" by Trueno	Christian Font	THIRD
2	Tigress	"Halo" by Beyoncé	undisclosed	SAFE
3	Skull	"Un Pacto" by Bersuit Vergarabat	undisclosed	SAFE
Round 2
1	Tigress	"MAFIOSA" by Nathy Peluso	Luana	WINNER
2	Skull	"Mal Bicho" by Los Fabulosos Cadillacs	Freddy "Zurdo" Bessio	RUNNER-UP
