= ¿Quién es la máscara? (Uruguayan TV series) season 2 =

¿Quién es la máscara?
- Season 2
- Hosted by: Maximiliano de la Cruz
- Judges: Emir Abdul; Fabián Delgado; Sofía Rodríguez; Patricia Wolf
- Winner: Annasofía Facello as "Caniche"
- Runner-up: Agus Padilla as "Chancleta"
- No. of episodes: 10

Release
- Original network: Teledoce
- Original release: 13 April – 15 June 2023

Season chronology
- ← Previous; Season 1 Next → Season 3

The second season of ¿Quién es la máscara? premiered on April 13, 2023 and lasted for 10 episodes. On June 15, Caniche (presenter Annasofía Facello) was declared the winner, and Chancleta (singer Agus Padilla) the runner-up.

== Panelists and host ==
The judging panel from last season consists of dancer Emir Abdul Gani, singer-songwriter Fabián Delgado, journalist and host Sofía Rodríguez, and model and actress Patricia Wolf. Actor and comedian Maximiliano de la Cruz made a return.

== Contestants ==
Stage name	Celebrity	Occupation	Episodes									
Stage name	Celebrity	Occupation	1	2	3	4	5	6	7	8	9	10
Caniche (Poodle)	Annasofía Facello	Presenter	WIN		WIN				RISK	WIN	WIN	WINNER
Chancleta (Sandal) (WC)	Agus Padilla	Singer			RISK	WIN	WIN		WIN	WIN	WIN	RUNNER-UP
Vaquita (Little Cow)	Florencia Infante	Actress	WIN				RISK		WIN	RISK	RISK	THIRD
Monstruito (Little Monster)	Guillermo Peluffo	Musician		WIN			WIN	RISK	WIN	WIN	OUT	
Carpincho (Capybara)	Mario Bergara	Politician		WIN	WIN		WIN	WIN		OUT		
Emoji	Gonzalo Moratorio	Virologist		RISK		WIN		WIN	OUT			
Koala Espejado (Mirrored Koala)	Laurita Fernández	Dancer		WIN		WIN		OUT				
Halcón (Hawk)	Carmelo Vidalín	Politician	WIN			RISK	OUT					
Camello (Camel) (WC)	Facundo Arana	Musician			WIN	OUT						
Jirafa (Giraffe)	Alejandro Figueredo	Journalist	RISK		OUT							
Mulita (Armadillo)	Emiliano Brancciari	Singer		OUT								
Muffin	Marta Sánchez	Singer	OUT									

The masked singer won its face-off and remained in the competition.
The masked singer lost its face-off, but was not eliminated.
The masked singer was eliminated from the competition and unmasked upon elimination.
The masked singer was saved from elimination.
The masked singer did not perform in this episode.

== Episodes ==
=== Week 1 (13 April) ===
Performances on the first episode
#	Stage name	Song	Identity	Result
1	Poodle	"(I Can’t Get No) Satisfaction" by The Rolling Stones	undisclosed	WIN
2	Giraffe	"Traicionera" by Cali Y El Dandee, Cosculluela, & Sebastián Yatra	undisclosed	RISK
3	Muffin	"Bad Romance" by Lady Gaga	Marta Sánchez	OUT
4	Hawk	"Hoy Corté Una Flor" by Leonardo Favio	undisclosed	WIN
5	Little Cow	"Tu Nombre" by Miel San Marcos	undisclosed	WIN

=== Week 2 (20 April) ===
Performances on the second episode
#	Stage name	Song	Identity	Result
1	Mirrored Koala	"Toxic" by Britney Spears	undisclosed	WIN
2	Armadillo	"Procuro Olvidarte" by José Vélez	Emiliano Brancciari	OUT
3	Capybara	"Radio Ga Ga" by Queen	undisclosed	WIN
4	Emoji	"El Farolito" by Los Piojos	undisclosed	RISK
5	Little Monster	"Escandalo" by Raphael	undisclosed	WIN

=== Week 3 (27 April and 3 May) ===
Performances on the third episode
#	Stage name	Song	Identity	Result
1	Camel	"Everybody Hurts" by R.E.M	undisclosed	WIN
2	Giraffe	"Se Bastasse Una Canzone" by Eros Ramazzotti	Alejandro Figueredo	OUT
3	Sandal	"Corazón Mentiroso" by Karina	undisclosed	RISK
4	Poodle	"Shakira: Bzrp Music Sessions, Vol. 53" by Bizarrap & Shakira	undisclosed	WIN
5	Capybara	"Cometa Blanca" by Peter Cruz	undisclosed	WIN

Performances on the fourth episode
#	Stage name	Song	Identity	Result
1	Hawk	"Juntos a La Par" by Pappo	undisclosed	RISK
2	Sandal	"Don" by Miranda!	undisclosed	WIN
3	Emoji	"Runaway" by Los Pericos	undisclosed	WIN
4	Camel	"You Can Leave Your Hat On" by Joe Cocker	Facundo Arana	OUT
5	Mirrored Koala	"Cambio Dolor" by Natalia Oreiro	undisclosed	WIN

=== Week 4 (11 May) ===
Performances on the fifth episode
#	Stage name	Song	Identity	Result
1	Capybara	"La Copa Rota" by Jose Feliciano	undisclosed	WIN
2	Hawk	"Ilaríe" by Xuxa	Carmelo Vidalín	OUT
3	Little Monster	"Rock DJ" by Robbie Williams	undisclosed	WIN
4	Little Cow	"Deja De Llorar" by Manolo Galván	undisclosed	RISK
5	Sandal	"Dejaría Todo" by Chayanne	undisclosed	WIN

=== Week 5 (18 May) ===
- Guest Performance: "Volare" by Gipsy Kings performed by Lion King

Performances on the sixth episode
#	Stage name	Song	Identity	Result
1	Capybara	"Mandy" by Barry Manilow	undisclosed	WIN
2	Mirrored Koala	"Gimme! Gimme! Gimme! (A Man After Midnight)" by ABBA	Laurita Fernández	OUT
3	Little Monster	"Dos" by Miranda!	undisclosed	RISK
4	Emoji	"Yendo a la Casa de Damián" by El Cuarteto de Nos	undisclosed	WIN

=== Week 6 (25 May) ===
Performances on the seventh episode
#	Stage name	Song	Identity	Result
1	Poodle	"Yesterday" by The Beatles	undisclosed	RISK
2	Little Cow	"Te Quiero Más" by Martina Stoessel & Nacho	undisclosed	WIN
3	Little Monster	"03-03-456" by Raffella Carrá	undisclosed	WIN
4	Emoji	"Ahora Te Puedes Marchar" by Luis Miguel	Gonzalo Moratorio	OUT
5	Sandal	"MAMIII" by Becky G & Karol G	undisclosed	WIN

=== Week 7 (1 June) ===
Performances on the eighth episode
#	Stage name	Song	Identity	Result
1	Sandal	"Vivo Por Ella" by Andrea Bocelli & Marta Sánchez	undisclosed	WIN
2	Capybara	"Niña Bonita" by Chino & Nacho	Mario Bergara	OUT
3	Poodle	"Poker Face" by Lady Gaga	undisclosed	WIN
4	Little Cow	"Llenos De Magia" by La Vela Puerca	undisclosed	RISK
5	Little Monster	"Un Poco De Amor Francés" by Patricio Rey & sus Redonditos de Ricota	undisclosed	WIN

=== Week 8 (8 June) ===
- Guest Performance: "A Mi Manera" by Gipsy Kings performed by Cacho de la Cruz as "Lion King"

Performances on the ninth episode
#	Stage name	Song	Identity	Result
1	Poodle	"Don't Get Me Wrong" by The Pretenders	undisclosed	WIN
2	Little Cow	"Si Te Vas" by Shakira	undisclosed	RISK
3	Little Monster	"Twist and Shout" by The Beatles	Guillermo Peluffo	OUT
4	Sandal	"Colgando en Tus Manos" by Carlos Baute & Marta Sanchez	undisclosed	WIN

=== Week 9 (15 June) - Finale ===
Performances on the tenth episode
#	Stage name	Song	Identity	Result
Round 1
1	Poodle	"No Te Creas Tan Importante" by Damas Gratis	undisclosed	SAFE
2	Little Cow	"Bella Ciao" by Becky G	Florencia Infante	THIRD
2	Little Cow	"Que Nadie Sepa Mi Sufrir" by La Sonora Dinamita	Florencia Infante	THIRD
3	Sandal	"No Podràs" by Cristian Castro	undisclosed	SAFE
Round 2
1	Sandal	"La Bachata" by Manuel Turizo	Agus Padilla	RUNNER-UP
2	Poodle	"Like A Prayer" by Madonna	Annasofía Facello	WINNER
