= Natalie Pérez =

Argentine actress and singer-songwriter (born 1986)

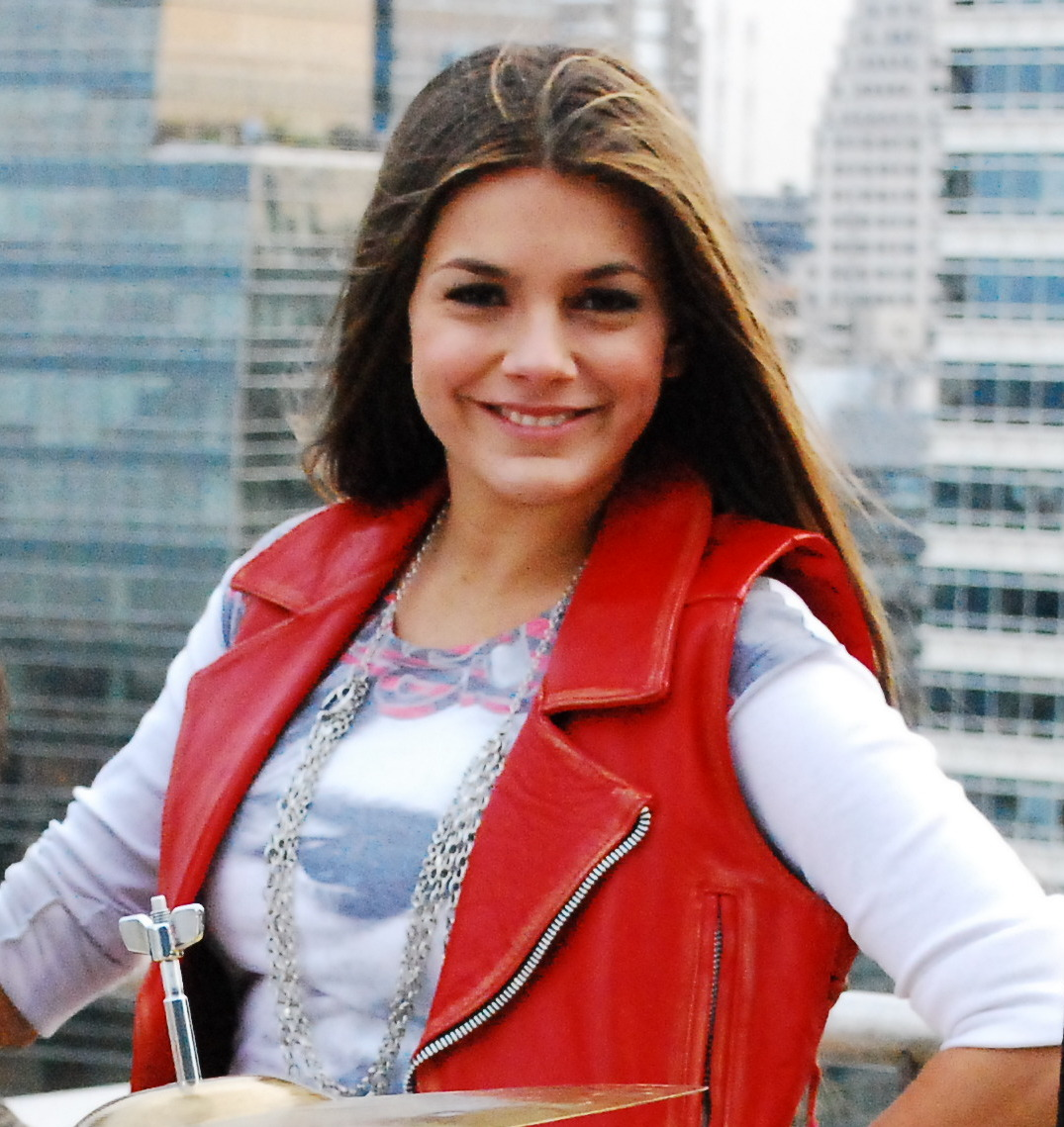
- Pérez in 2009
- Born: Natalie Mercedes Pérez; November 4, 1986 (age 39); Villa Urquiza, Buenos Aires, Argentina
- Occupations: Actress; singer; songwriter
- Years active: 1999–present
- Awards: Full list
- Musical career
- Instruments: Vocals, Guitar and Piano
- Label: Warner Group

Natalie Pérez (born November 4, 1986) She is an Argentine television, theater, film actress and singer-songwriter. She rose to fame after appearing on the children's television series Chiquititas (1999). She also appeared on the telenovelas Rebelde Way (2002–2003), Consentidos (2009–2010), Graduados (2012), Guapas (2014–2015), Esperanza mía (2015–2016), and Las Estrellas (2017–2018).

After signing with Warner Music Group, Pérez released her debut studio album titled Un Té de Tilo Por Favor (2018), and in the following year she released the deluxe edition of the album, which contains five collaborations along with Fabiana Cantilo, Loli Molina, Coti, Los Caligaris and Lisandro Aristimuño. It was followed by the releases of the studio albums Detox (2020) and Intermitente (2023).

== Early life ==
Natalie Pérez was born on November 4, 1986, in Villa Urquiza, Buenos Aires, Argentina.

== Career ==
=== Acting debut (1999–2011) ===
She debuted as an actress in 1999 in Chiquititas. The following year she was part of Megatrix and in 2002 of Dadivertido, both programs broadcast by Telefe. In 2003 she participated in the soap opera of El Trece, Dr. Amor and in the teen soap opera Rebelde Way. That same year, she had her film debut with the film Ay Juancito, directed by Héctor Olivera, based on the life of the Argentine politician Juan Ramón Duarte; where she played Susana Canales. In 2004 she was part of the cast of the Telefe youth telenovela Frecuencia 04. A musical CD was released with the television series, in which Pérez participated.

In 2005 she worked on the El Nueve telenovela, Sálvame María, and made a special participation in the El Trece comedy Una familia especial. The following years she participated in the telenovelas Tango del último amor, a co-production between Argentina and Russia, and El código Rodríguez. In 2007 she ventured into the theater with the play Alicia, un país de maravilla, and a year later she acted in Operación Caperucita, both directed by Héctor Pressa at the Teatro La Galera. That same year she gave her voice to the animated film Valentina, by Eduardo Gondell.

During 2009 she obtained her first leading role in the children's soap opera Consentidos by El Trece. There she played Luna. Fiction had its soundtrack entitled "Algo bueno va a pasar" an album made up of ten songs, six of which were performed by Natalie (three individually and three collectively). The telenovela premiered for Latin American audiences through Disney Channel Latin America.

=== Recognition and more acting roles (2011–2017) ===
In 2011 she was summoned to star in the theatrical classic El deluvio que viene in the city of Mar del Plata. With the character of Clementina, under the direction of Manuel González Gil, there she was shortlisted as "Female Revelation" at the 2011 Sea Star Awards.

In April 2012, the online radio program (up to and including 2014), Más rebeldes que nunca premiered on radioypunto.com, in which she participated along with Nicolás Riedel, Augusto Costabile, and Ariadna Asturzzi; the program was produced by La Estación Produce. In May she joined the Telefe program, Todo es posible In the following months, she joined the permanent cast of the telecomedy Graduados, also from Telefe, where she plays Luna. In July, for the winter holidays, she is summoned by Sergio Lombardo to star in the play Cenicienta, un cuento musical, directed by Juan Martín Picarel.

In December 2013, she joined the cast of the comedy Mi amor, mi amor, and signed a contract with the producer Sabrina Romay to star in the play, Camila. In 2013 she joined the cast of Los vecinos en guerra (Telefe) where she plays Lucas's ex-girlfriend, a character played by Gastón Soffritti. In 2014 she played Cintia Miguens, in the successful comedy Guapas, of Pol-ka. In 2015 she played the villain of the sitcom Esperanza mía, starring Lali Espósito, in said sitcom Natalie participated in the soundtrack.

In 2016, she starred along with Fernando Dente and Ángela Torres in the musical Peter pan, todos podemos volar, which was presented at the Teatro Gran Rex and was directed by Ariel Del Mastro. In 2017 she was part of Las Estrellas, a telenovela by El Trece produced by Pol-Ka in which she is part as one of the five protagonists, sharing the role with Marcela Kloosterboer, Celeste Cid, Violeta Urtizberea and Justina Bustos.

=== Musical debut with Un Té de Tilo Por Favor (2017–2019) ===
In December 2017, he released her first single as a solo singer, "Algo tiene", produced by Nico Cotton and Mateo Rodó. The video clip that accompanies the song was directed by Nicolás Sedano and produced by Denise Kemelmajer. It reached one million views in the week of its release. In 2018 she released her second and third singles titled "Lluvia" and "Lo que perdimos" respectively. In November she released her first album Un Té de Tilo, Por Favor with 11 songs, including "Lluvia", "Lo que perdimos", "Algo tiene", among others. Then, she released the song "Último día", that is on the album, as a single. On November 24, she sang live in the Trastienda presenting her first record material.

In 2019 she was part of Pequeña Victoria, a telenovela from Telefe produced by Viacom along with Julieta Díaz, Inés Estévez and Mariana Genesio Peña.

=== Detox and Intermitente (2020–present) ===
In May 2020, she made her debut on the Netflix platform with the series Almost Happy alongside Sebastián Wainraich. In August of that year, she performed a streaming concert, due to the context of the pandemic, which she baptized "Ritual", and on November 4 as a self-birthday present, she released her second album Detox, with 8 tracks. On May 17, 2021, she participated in the opening of the program Showmatch by El Trece singing the song "Dance Monkey" in Spanish.

== Filmography ==
=== Film ===
Year	Title	Role	Notes	Director
2004	Ay Juancito	Susana Canales	Cast role	Héctor Olivera
2008	Valentina	Andy	Dubbing	Eduardo Gondell
2019	Amor de película	Vera Marino Mujíca	Lead role	Sebastián Mega Díaz

=== Television ===
Year	Title	Role	Notes
1999	Chiquititas	Victoria Bustamante	Antagonist
2001	Megatrix	Herself	Chronicler
2003	Rebelde Way	Verónica Pacheco	Guest role
2004	Frecuencia 04	Nataly	Lead role
2005	Una familia especial	Viviana	Guest role
2005	Sálvame María	Natalia	Guest role
2006	El código Rodríguez	Sofía Rodríguez / Diega	Guest role
2006	Tango del íltimo amor	Carolina	Guest role
2009–2010	Consentidos	Luna Guzmán García Mujíca / Luna Moreno	Lead role
2012	Graduados	Luna Ponte Vedra	Guest role
2012	Todo es posible	Herself	Host
2012–2013	Mi amor, mi amor	Noel Valtierra Fernández	Guest role
2013–2014	Los vecinos en guerra	Valeria Acosta	Guest role
2014–2015	Guapas	Cinthia Miguens	Antagonist
2015–2016	Esperanza mía	Eva Monti	Antagonist
2017	Bailando por un Sueño	Herself	Guest partner of Lourdes Sánchez (twelfth season)
2017–2018	Las Estrellas	Carla Estrella	Lead role
2018	El host	Milagros González	Lead role
2019	Pequeña Victoria	Bárbara Salvatierra	Lead role
2020–2022	Almost Happy	Pilar Araújo	Lead role
2020	MasterChef Celebrity Argentina	Herself	Temporary replacement for El Polaco
2021	Bailando por un Sueño	Herself	Opening of the fifteenth season
2021	Pequeñas Victorias	Bárbara Salvatierra	Lead role
2021	Victoria, psicóloga vengadora	Clara	Episode 6
2021	Días de gallos	DJ	Guest role
2023	¿Quién es la máscara?	Herself	Contestant of the third season

== Discography ==
- Un Té de Tilo Por Favor (2018)
- Detox (2020)
- Intermitente (2023)
- Casa (2026)

== Awards and nominations ==
Award	Year (Note: Indicates the year of ceremony. Each year is linked to the article about the awards held that year, wherever possible.)	Recipients	Category	Result	Ref.
Gardel Awards	2019	Un Té de Tilo Por Favor	Best Female Pop Artist Album	Nominated	
Martín Fierro Awards	2018	Las Estrellas	Best Leading Actress in Daily Fiction	Nominated	
Martín Fierro Awards	2022	Pequeñas Victorias	Best Leading Actress in Fiction	Nominated	
Nickelodeon Argentina Kids' Choice Awards	2013	Herself	Female Revelation	Nominated	
Nickelodeon Argentina Kids' Choice Awards	2015	Herself	Diosa	Won	
Nickelodeon Argentina Kids' Choice Awards	2015	Herself	Chica Trendy	Won	
Premios Hugo al Teatro Musical	2012	Herself	Female Revelation	Won	
Premios Hugo al Teatro Musical	2014	Herself	Best Female Performer	Won	
Sea Star Awards	2011	Herself	Female Revelation	Nominated	
Tato Awards	2017	Las Estrellas	Leading Actress of Daily Fiction	Nominated	
