= Carlos Sosa =

Carlos Sosa may refer to:

- Carlos Sosa, Musician and founder of Grooveline Horns
- Carlos Sosa (footballer) (1919–2009), Argentine footballer
- DJ Sneak (Carlos Sosa, born 1969), Puerto Rican disc jockey
- Carlos Sosa, former member of the band Chocolate
- Carlos Sosa, character in The OA
