= Hogar, dulce hogar (TV series) =

- Genre: Sitcom; Cringe comedy
- Written by: Gonzálo Gómez; Ana Magnabosco; Jimena Márquez; Eduardo Rigaud; Daniel Bello
- Directed by: Diana Álvarez
- Starring: Paola Bianco; Cristina Morán; Hugo Arana; Leonor Svarcas; Sebastián Almada; Elena Brancatti; Hugo Blandamuro; Alejandra Moncalvo; Jorge Bazzano; Ernesto Liotti
- Country of origin: Uruguay
- Original language: Spanish
- No. of seasons: 1
- No. of episodes: 12

Production
- Production location: Montevideo
- Running time: 30–35 minutes

Original release
- Network: Channel 10
- Release: July 24 – October 9, 2009

Hogar, dulce hogar (Spanish for 'Home, sweet home') is a Uruguayan television sitcom that aired on Channel 10 in 2009. It is based on the Telecinco series Escenas de Matrimonio created by José Luis Moreno. The show depicts the everyday lives of several couples who reside in the same apartment building, focusing on their interpersonal relationships and the domestic and personal conflicts they face.

== Cast and characters ==
- Paola Bianco as Verónica
- Graciela Rodríguez as Julia
- Hugo Arana as Rolando
- Elena Brancatti as Carmen
- Jorge Bazzano as Enrique
- Sebastián Almada as Federico
- Leonor Svarcas as Leticia
- Cristina Morán as Begonia
- Hugo Blandamuro as Cayetano
- Alejandra Moncalvo as María
- Ernesto Liotti as Tito

== Production ==
=== Development ===
Channel 10 announced the acquisition of the adaptation rights to Escenas de Matrimonio in late 2008, confirming the development of a twelve-episode Uruguayan adaptation of the Spanish series. The project marked the network's second production within the sitcom genre, following Piso 8 (2007). The screenplay was developed by a writing team led by Gonzalo Gómez, with contributions from Ana Magnabosco, Patricia Márquez, Eduardo Rigaud, and Daniel Bello, each responsible for different couples featured in the show.

The cast was announced in early April 2009 and was largely composed of actors with strong backgrounds in theatre, many of whom had prior experience in comedy. The series also marked the return of Cristina Morán—one of the most prominent figures in Uruguayan television since its early years—to scripted fiction. Argentine actor Hugo Arana was invited to join the production and portrayed the character Rolando.

=== Filming and release ===
The series was directed by Argentine filmmaker Diana Álvarez. Principal photography took place during the first half of 2009 at Estudios Tajam in Montevideo, becoming the first Uruguayan comedy series to be produced in high definition. The production was officially presented on 8 July 2009 at a launch event held at the Solís Theatre and was supported by an advertising campaign promoted by the network. Hogar, dulce hogar premiered on 24 July 2009, achieving an average audience share of 12 rating points.

The series received a nomination for Best Fiction at the 16th Iris Awards.
