= El amor después del amor (TV series) =

- Country of origin: Argentina
- Original language: Spanish

Original release
- Release: 2023

El amor después del amor (English: Love After Music) is a 2023 Netflix series. The plot tells the story of the beginnings, career, problems and stardom of Argentine singer-songwriter Fito Páez, one of the greatest exponents of rock in Spanish. Its name is inspired by the namesake album and song.

== Cast ==
- Iván Hochman - Fito Páez
  - Gaspar Offenhenden - Fito Páez as child
- Micaela Riera - Fabiana Cantilo
- Martín Campilongo - Rodolfo Páez
- Andy Chango - Charly García
- Mirella Pascual - Zulema «Belia» Ramírez
- Mónica Raiola - Josefa «Pepa» Páez
- Eugenia Guerty - Charito Páez
- Mariano Saborido - Alejandro Avalis
- Manuel Fanego - Andrés Gallo
- Victoria Bernardi - Margarita Zulema Ávalos
- Fernando Ritucci - Eduardo Carrizo
- Matías Okosi - Daniel Wirtz
- Nahuel Monasterio - Fena Della Maggiora
- Juan Risso - Daniel Grimbank
- Joaquín Baglietto - Juan Carlos Baglietto
- Valentín Roitman - Joe Stefanuolo
- Luis Ziembrowski - Portunato
- Brian Vainberg - Alfredo
- Ezequiel Encinas - Pipo Cipolatti
- Ivo Navarro - Fabián Gallardo
- Mauricio Di Yorio - Walter de Giusti
- Daryna Butryk - Cecilia Roth
- Julián Kartun - Luis Alberto Spinetta
- Jean Pierre Noher - André Midani
- Gastón Frías - Batato Barea
- Dante Bruni - Federico Moura
- Pablo Turturiello - Marcelo Moura
- Tomás Raimondi - Julio Moura
- Javier Morado - Andrés Calamaro
- Charlie Anderle - Iñigo Zabala

== Awards ==
- 2023: Rolling Stone en Español Award - Series of the Year
- 2023: Silver Condor Award - 10 awards, including Best Series
- 2024: Platino Award for Best Supporting Actor in a Miniseries or TV series
- 2024: Premio Aura for Best Male Newcomer
