= Paola Bianco =

Uruguayan television presenter and actress (born 1975)

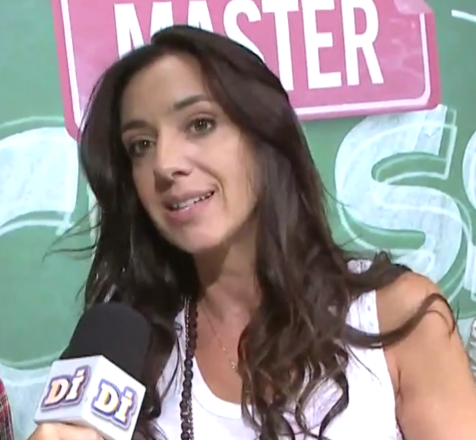
- Bianco in 2017
- Born: Paola Gabriela Bianco Ruggiero; October 24, 1975 (age 50); Montevideo, Uruguay
- Occupations: Television presenter; actress; dancer
- Years active: 1985–present
- Spouse: Darío Sisiasvili (m. 2015; div. 2021)
- Children: 4

Paola Gabriela Bianco Ruggiero (born October 24, 1975) is a Uruguayan television presenter and actress. She began her career as a dancer on the long-running children's television program Cacho Bochinche and later went on to host children's and youth-oriented programs, through which she gained widespread recognition.

== Early life ==
Paola Gabriela Bianco Ruggiero was born on October 24, 1975, in Montevideo, to television and carnival show writer Jorge Bianco and producer María Ruggiero. She is of Italian descent on both her maternal and paternal sides and has two siblings, Marcelo and Fabricio. She attended public schools, including Liceo Héctor Miranda.

Raised in an artistically inclined family, she studied at the National School of Dance during her childhood and adolescence and was a member of the youth choir of the Official Service for Broadcasting, Performances and Entertainment.

== Career ==
Bianco began her media career in 1985 as a member of the choir and dance ensemble of Teledoce’s children’s television program Cacho Bochinche. She also took part in the program’s live performances and touring shows. In 1990, she was selected by the network to portray the character April O'Neil on El Club de las Tortugas Ninja. In 1994, she co-hosted Maxidibujos on Canal 5 alongside Maximiliano de la Cruz, a comedy program aimed at children that combined comedy sketches with the presentation of animated series aired on the channel.

In 1995, Bianco and De la Cruz were recruited by Teledoce to host the daily show Maxianimados, which followed the same format as Maxidibujos and brought them widespread recognition among child and pre-teen audiences. In 2004, she began co-hosting Canal 10’s children’s television program Loco de Vos alongside Jorge Echagüe. The weekday show was structured around studio games and competitions involving child participants, combined with musical and dance segments. It achieved high audience ratings and gained significant popularity, which led to live stage performances and the release of five albums featuring original songs from the program, all of which were certified gold. Bianco remained on the program until 2007, when she left following a decision by the production company and was replaced by Ana Laura Romano.

Following her departure from Loco de Vos, she worked as an on-location co-host of the Channel 10 program Desafío al Corazón, alongside Humberto de Vargas. The show, which featured charitable challenges whose completion resulted in donations to beneficiary institutions, was marked by the Young tragedy, an incident that occurred in the city of Young, during the filming of one of its episodes, in which eight people died. In 2009, she was cast as Verónica in the sitcom Hogar, dulce hogar, the Uruguayan adaptation of the Spanish series Escenas de Matrimonio. From 2010 to 2011, she co-hosted the culinary magazine program En su salsa with chef Sergio Puglia.

== Filmography ==
=== Television ===
Year	Title	Role	Notes
1990–1993	El club de las Tortugas Ninja	Herself/April O'Neil	Co-host
1994	Maxidibujos	Herself	Co-host
1995–2000	Maxianimados	Herself	Co-host
2004–2007	Loco de vos	Herself	Co-host
2004–2008	Desafío al corazón	Herself	Co-host
2010–2011	En su salsa	Herself	Co-host
2015	Me resbala	Herself	Contestant
2009	Hogar, dulce hogar	Verónica	Main cast
2017	MasterClass	Herself	Host
2021–2023	El show de la tarde	Herself	Co-host
2023–2024	Mi casa es tu casa	Herself	Host
2024	¿Quién es la máscara?	Herself/Toucan	Contestant
2024	Fuego sagrado	Herself	Contestant

=== Theatre ===
Year	Title	Role	Playwright	Venue	Ref.
2017	Hijos nuestros	Paola		Sala Teatro Movie, Montevideo	
2025	La guionista del presidente	Guionista	Fernando Schmidt	Teatro del Anglo, Montevideo	
