= Un Té de Tilo Por Favor =

2020 studio album by Natalie Pérez

- Standard cover

Studio album by Natalie Pérez
- Released: 14 October 2018
- Genre: Latin pop
- Length: 36:43
- Label: Warner
- Producer: Mateo Rodo; Nicolás Cotton

Natalie Pérez chronology
Un Té de Tilo Por Favor (2018)	Detox (2020)

Singles from Un Té de Tilo Por Favor
- 1. "Algo Tiene" Released: 2017; 2. "Lluvia" Released: 2018

Un Té de Tilo Por Favor is the debut studio album by Argentine singer-songwriter Natalie Pérez, released on 14 October 2018 through Warner Music Chile. The album was produced by Mateo Rodo and Nicolás Cotton, and received a nomination for Best Pop Artist Album at the Premios Gardel. A deluxe edition, released in 2019, features reversions of the songs with guest artists such as Coti and Fabiana Cantilo.

== Background and composition ==
Pérez described the songs on the album as "beautiful, sweet, about love, waiting for wishes, full of passion and organic sounds, a lot of joy." About the album, she added: "Personally I feel that it is an album full of magic for being the first and for having the particularity of being different, pleasant, it is an album that accompanies."

The album was described as a latin pop record with native sounds. Various influences appear on the album that the singer herself identifies as part of her life: Natalia Lafourcade, Julieta Venegas, Charly García, Fito Páez, Andrés Calamaro, and Mercedes Sosa.

== Concept, artwork and title ==
About the album title, Pérez stated: "A Linden Tea is a little like this whole storm of life, of everyday life. That's the time to go down, to be calm. I always need something to bring me down to be calm, a pause, my space." The title is inspired by the username of her Instagram account. In the album cover, Pérez can be seen sailing on a cup of tea, unconcerned about the approaching storm.

== Release and promotion ==
The singer presented Un Té de Tilo Por Favor at La Trastienda Club, on 24 November 2018. She also performed at the Teatro Vorterix.

== Track listing ==
All songs were written by Natalie Pérez, Mateo Rodo and Nicolás Cotton, and produced by the latter two. Additional writers given below.

Un Té de Tilo Por Favor – Standard Edition
No.	Title	Writer(s)	Length
1.	"Quisiera"		3:52
2.	"Lluvia"		3:35
3.	"Último Día"	David Rodriguez Labault	3:14
4.	"Lo Que Perdimos"		3:27
5.	"Algo Tiene"		3:04
6.	"Te Esperaré"		3:11
7.	"Hoy"		3:14
8.	"Escorpión"		3:20
9.	"Pegaditos"		3:22
10.	"En las Olas"		4:08
11.	"Rayo de Sol"		2:09
Total length:			36:43

Un Té de Tilo Por Favor – Deluxe Edition
No.	Title	Length
12.	"Pegaditos" (with Fabiana Cantilo)	3:21
13.	"Escorpión" (with Loli Molina)	3:24
14.	"Quisiera" (with Coti)	3:54
15.	"Algo Tiene" (with Los Caligaris)	3:04
16.	"En las Olas" (with Lisandro Aristimuño)	4:13
Total length:		54:42
