= Laura Martínez (television presenter) =

Uruguayan entertainer (born 1964)

- Born: Laura Martínez Listur; 2 July 1964 (age 61); Montevideo, Uruguay
- Occupations: Presenter; actress; dancer; television personality
- Spouse: Cacho de la Cruz (before 2009) Marcelo Bianchi (m. 2013–2015)
- Children: Santiago

Laura Martínez (born 2 July 1964) is a Uruguayan presenter, actress, dancer and television personality. She began dancing as a child, appearing at an early age at the Teatro Colón. In 1982, she was invited by Uruguay's Teledoce to take part in a sketch. Ever since, she has featured in television programmes and is now a well-known presenter, personality and performer. She has appeared in Laura en un Maravilloso Mundo ('"Laura a Wonderful World"), a children's television program where she sings and dances with five girls. Previously married to Cacho de la Cruz, with whom she has a son, Santi. She married accountant Marcelo Bianchi on 5 January 2013.

== Selected works ==
- 1982 - "Telecataplum" - Teledoce
- 1983 - 2005 - "El Show del Mediodía" - Teledoce
- 1985 - 2010 - "Cacho Bochinche" - Teledoce
- 1989 - "Radio City Music Hall" (adult theatre with Cacho de la Cruz)
- 1990 - "Llegó la Tía Chichita" (theatre)
- 2000 - "Premio Har de Oro al mérito empresarial por su labor en la Academia de Danza "Swing"
- 2001 - "Adelante mi Coronel" (theatre)
- 2003 - "Ahora vas a ver" (CD Bochinche Cacho on its 30th anniversary)'
- 2007 - "Un Cuento Fantástico" (children's theatre)
- 2008 - "Bailando por un Reino" (children's theatre)
- 2009 - "Brujas" (theatre)
- 2010 - "Buscando a Dino" (children's theatre)
- 2011 - "Laura 3D" - Latinoamérica Televisión
- 2012 - "Lo que Ellos Quieren" (theatre)
- 2012 - "Laura en un Maravilloso Mundo" (children's theatre)
- 2012 - 2013 - "Zona Viva" - Channel 7
- 2013 - "El Salvador" (theatre)
- 2013 - "Laura y las Chin Chin al Rescate" (children's theatre)
- 2013 - "Laura en tu Casa" - Saeta TV Channel 10
- 2016 - "El Francés" - (fiction TV)
- 2017 - 2018 - "Punta Es" - Channel 11
- 2017 - present - "Laura Contigo" - Channel 11
- 2020 - "MasterChef Celebrity Uruguay" - (reality show, contestant) - Saeta TV Channel 10
