= Argentines in Uruguay =

Ethnic group in Uruguay

Argentinos en Uruguay
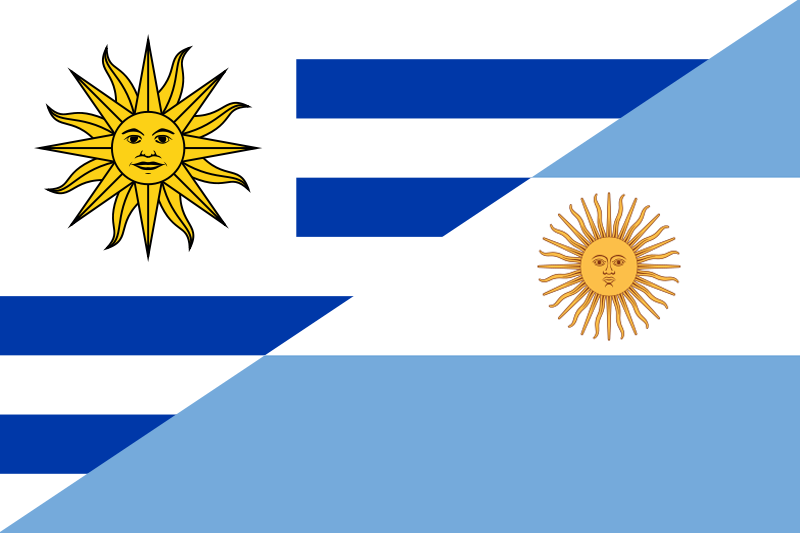

Total population
- 137.501

Regions with significant populations
- Montevideo · Punta Del Este · Colonia del Sacramento

Languages
- Rioplatense Spanish

Religion
- Roman Catholicism

Related ethnic groups
- Other Brazilians in Uruguay,

Argentine Uruguayans are people born in Argentina who live in Uruguay. In 2010, there were over 10,000 Argentines living in Uruguayan territory.

== Overview ==
Many Argentine-born persons reside in Uruguay, for a number of reasons. Both countries share the same language, culture and ethnicity and their populations bear striking similarities; the historical origins of both nations is common (part of the Viceroyalty of the River Plate, Spanish Empire); both countries are members of MERCOSUR, there is no need for special migration documents, and circulation is relatively easy. Uruguay is a small, quiet country, with wide beaches on the Atlantic Ocean, so many Argentines choose Uruguay as their usual holiday destination, some of them even as permanent residence; Argentine people come to Uruguay in search of a better quality of life. The Uruguayan resort Punta del Este is famous as "the biggest Argentine seaside resort".

The 2011 Uruguayan census revealed 26,782 people who declared Argentina as their country of birth. In 2013, there were almost 6,000 Argentine citizens registered in the Uruguayan social security.

Argentines in Uruguay have their own institutions, such as the Uruguayan-Argentine Institute, a bilingual school in Punta del Este.

In 2022, It was confirmed Colonia was going to make a Silicon Valley in Colonia called 'Colonia Ala Este' to bring more Argentine immigrants due to the bad economy in Argentina doubling their population making their goal reach to about 60,000 people in total in Colonia. With an initial investment of more than US$100 million, it was planned to build a sustainable city open to the community to generate a hub for the knowledge economy industry on a 500-hectare site, which includes forests and seven kilometers of coastline. with beaches such as Calabrés and Fernando.

== Notable people ==
past

- Torcuato de Alvear (1822-1890), politician, son and father of presidents of Argentina
- Virginia Bolten (1870-1960), activist
- Roberto Reinaldo Cáceres González (1921-2019), bishop emeritus of Melo
- Manuel Arturo Claps (1920-1999), writer, member of the Generation of 45
- Cacho de la Cruz (1937-2025), television presenter
- Esteban Echeverría (1805-1851), poet, writer, and political activist
- Matilde Ibáñez Tálice (1907-2002), First Lady of Uruguay as wife of President Luis Batlle Berres, and mother of President Jorge Batlle Ibáñez
- Tristán Narvaja (1819-1877), legal scholar, compiler of the Uruguayan Civil Code
- José Rondeau (1773-1844), general, Provisional Governor and Captain General of Uruguay (1828)
- Alberto Zum Felde (1887-1976), historian, essayist and critic

present

- Thelma Biral, actress, studied with Margarita Xirgu and started her theatre career in Montevideo
- Julio Bocca, ballet dancer, current director of SODRE National Ballet
- Martín Bonjour, footballer
- Emiliano Brancciari, musician
- Gustavo Cordera, musician, frontman of the band Bersuit Vergarabat
- Carlos María Domínguez, journalist
- Marcos Galperin, businessman, founder and CEO of MercadoLibre
- Macarena Gelman, politician, granddaughter of poet Juan Gelman
- Gabriel Migliónico, footballer
- Mónica Navarro, singer and actress
- Daniel Pereira, footballer

== See also ==
- Argentina–Uruguay relations
- Argentine diaspora
- Immigration to Uruguay
- Uruguayans in Argentina
