= Vespertinas =

- Genre: Talk show
- Presented by: Sofía Rodríguez; Adriana Da Silva; Valeria Tanco
- Country of origin: Uruguay
- Original language: Spanish

Production
- Executive producers: Danny Jokas; Felipe Habermel
- Producer: Andrea Pozzolo
- Production locations: Channel 4 Headquarters, Montevideo
- Running time: 90 minutes
- Production company: 10/14 Productions

Original release
- Network: Channel 4
- Release: April 16, 2018 – June 25, 2021

Vespertinas was an Uruguayan daytime talk show aired from 2018 to 2021. Broadcast on Channel 4, it featured a panel of three female presenters who interview public figures, discuss their lives, and discuss topical issues ranging from politics and current affairs to celebrity gossip and entertainment news.

It debuted on April 16, 2018, and ended on June 25, 2021. It was canceled due to low audience ratings and high production costs, which did not generate profit for the broadcaster. On November 15, 2019, the show aired the 400th episode.

== Format ==
The show consists of a talk show where a panel composed of three women discusses current informative topics, and in which the presenters debate, together with the opinion of experts, special reports and testimonials.

== On-air staff ==
Member	Years
Co-host
Sofía Rodríguez	2018–2021
Adriana Da Silva	2018–2021
Valeria Tanco	2018–2021
Inés Pereyra	2018
Leonor Svarcas	2018–2019
Reporter
Daro Kneubuhler	2018–2021
