= Liceo Héctor Miranda =

Coordinates: 34°53′29″S 56°10′59″W

Héctor Miranda Lyceum
- Liceo Héctor Miranda
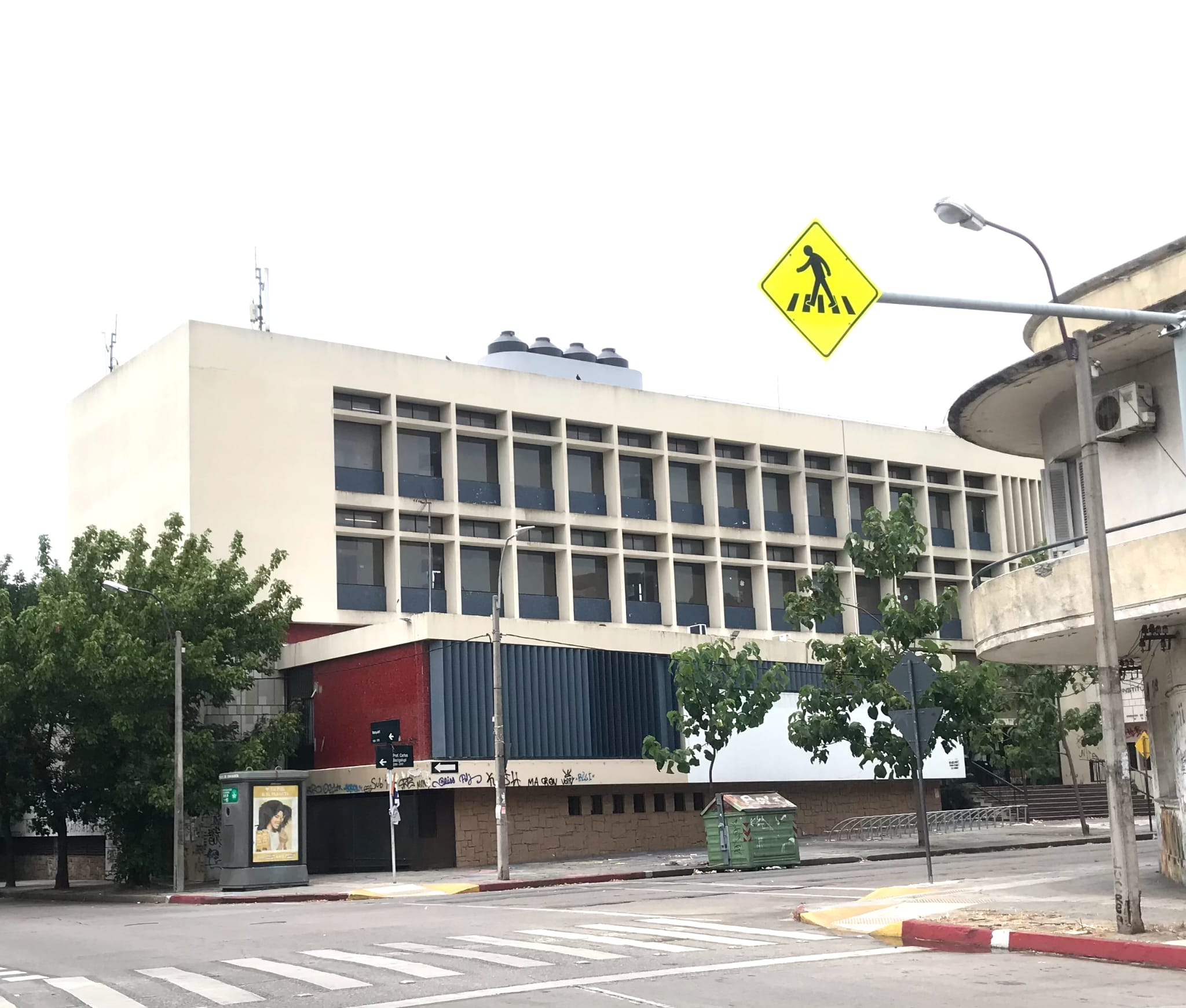
- Liceo Héctor Miranda in 2021

Location
- 2244 Profesor Carlos Bacigalupi St. Aguada, Montevideo; Uruguay

Information
- Other name: Liceo No. 2 de Montevideo
- Type: Public secondary
- Established: 1916
- Gender: Coeducational
- Website: Liceo Héctor Miranda

Liceo Héctor Miranda, officially designated Liceo No. 2 of Montevideo, is a public secondary school in Montevideo, Uruguay. Located in the Aguada neighborhood, it provides upper secondary education, serving students in the final three years of secondary school, corresponding to Educación Media Superior (grades 10 to 12).

== History ==
Liceo Héctor Miranda was established following the enactment of a law on January 18, 1916, which authorized the government to create two new public secondary education institutions in Montevideo in order to relieve overcrowding in the existing secondary education system. These institutions were collectively known as the Liceos de la Capital (Spanish for 'Capital City Secondary Schools'). In 1918, the institutions—officially designated Liceo No. 1 and Liceo No. 2—were additionally assigned honorary names: Liceo No. 1 received the name José Enrique Rodó, while Liceo No. 2 received the name Héctor Miranda, at the initiative of the then dean of the Section of Secondary and Preparatory Education. Héctor Miranda was a historian and politician who, while serving as a parliamentarian, introduced the first bill on women's civil rights in 1914.

In its early years, the school operated with only first- and second-year classes and enrolled 381 students at the beginning of its activities; by 1925, enrollment had increased to 1,910 students. The classroom desks were commissioned from an Indianapolis-based American manufacturer specializing in educational furniture. In 1917, the institution established its first Student Association.

== Building ==
The school's first premises were located in a building on 2268 Sierra Street, now Fernández Crespo Avenue, in the Aguada neighborhood. In subsequent years, Liceo Héctor Miranda operated additional annexes in adjacent properties, where second-, third-, and fourth-year classes (grades 8, 9, and 10) were held.

During the 1950s, construction began on a new school building in a modern architectural style on Professor Carlos Bacigalupi Street, located approximately 350 metres from the original site. The new premises were inaugurated in 1959, while the former building was later reassigned to house Liceo Francisco Acuña de Figueroa from 1963 onward. The current building was declared a Site of Departmental Interest by the Intendancy of Montevideo in 2015.

== Notable alumni ==
- Mario Benedetti – novelist and poet
- Paola Bianco – television presenter
- Ana Olivera – politician
- Óscar Tabárez – football manager
