= Ricardo Alarcón (businessman) =

Uruguayan businessman and sports executive

41st President of the Club Nacional de Football
- In office 2006–2012
- Preceded by: Víctor Della Valle
- Succeeded by: Eduardo Ache

Personal details
- Born: Ricardo Humberto Alarcón Pereiro; 19 November 1947 (age 78) Montevideo, Uruguay
- Domestic partner: Pierana Ferrer
- Children: Lucía, Carolina, Virginia and Ignacio
- Occupation: Businessman; sports club president; television personality

Ricardo Humberto Alarcón Pereiro (born 19 November 1947) is a Uruguayan businessman, who served as the 41st president of the Club Nacional de Football.

== Early life and education ==
He was born on November 19, 1947, as the youngest of the four children of Carlos Alarcón, a Chilean who settled in Uruguay in his teens after his parents died in an earthquake, and his wife Lucía Pereiro, who died when Ricardo was two years old. Raised in the barrio Cordón, he completed the first four years of primary education at the Crandon Institute, and the last two at the José Pedro Varela Public School. He attended high school at Liceo No. 2 Miranda, in which he served as general secretary of the student association, and at the Liceo Militar for two years.

== Business career ==
In 1978 he founded the financial institution Credisol, which began promoting itself during the carnival shows. During the second administration of president Julio María Sanguinetti he was appointed chairman of the Uruguayan flag carrier, PLUNA. In 2007 he created La Ciudad de los Chicos, a children's entertainment venue located in the Montevideo Shopping mall. However, it closed in 2017.

In 2022, he participated in the television reality show ¿Quién es la máscara?, an adaptation of the South Korean format Masked Singer, ranking 11th.

=== President of the Club Nacional de Football ===
In 2006 Alarcón was elected president of the Club Nacional de Football. During his administration, he implemented a project called "National Culture" aimed at strengthening the club's institutional image and reinforcing its institutional structure, such as the flow of members, the expansion of the Estadio Gran Parque Central and "bring" the family closer to football.

During his administration, Nacional conquered the 2008-09 Uruguayan Championship, the 2010-11 Uruguayan Championship and the 2011-12 Uruguayan Championship, as well as the 2007 and 2008 Pre-Libertador Playoffs, and also reached one of the best positions at the continental level by reaching to the semifinals in the 2009 Copa Libertadores.

Regarding the achievements at the social level, on October 15, 2009, it was announced that the club reached 25,000 members, increasing its social flow by 42.86% for 2 years, taking into account that the club had approximately 17,500 members at the beginning of his mandate.

In December 2009, he was re-elected to the post after a landslide victory, in which he won 10 posts out of 11 on the club's board. In addition, while Alarcón was in office, Sebastián Coates was transferred to Liverpool for 12 million euros, which broke the record for being the most expensive in Uruguayan football.

== Personal life ==
He is currently in a relationship with the educator Pierana Ferrer. At the beginning of 2021 he contracted COVID-19, was hospitalized for 55 days in the ICU of the British Hospital of Montevideo. He has publicly expressed his support for the Broad Front.
