= Trotsky Vengarán =

- Origin: Montevideo, Uruguay
- Genres: Punk rock
- Years active: 1991-present
- Labels: Universal Records, Montevideo Music Group, Ruta 66, Koala Records, ORFEO
- Members: Guillermo Peluffo; Hugo Diaz; Guillermo "Cuico" Perazzo; Juan Pablo Granito Virè
- Past members: Marcelo Abreu; Ignacio Guasch; Felipe Di Stefani; Nicolás Pequera; Hector Souto

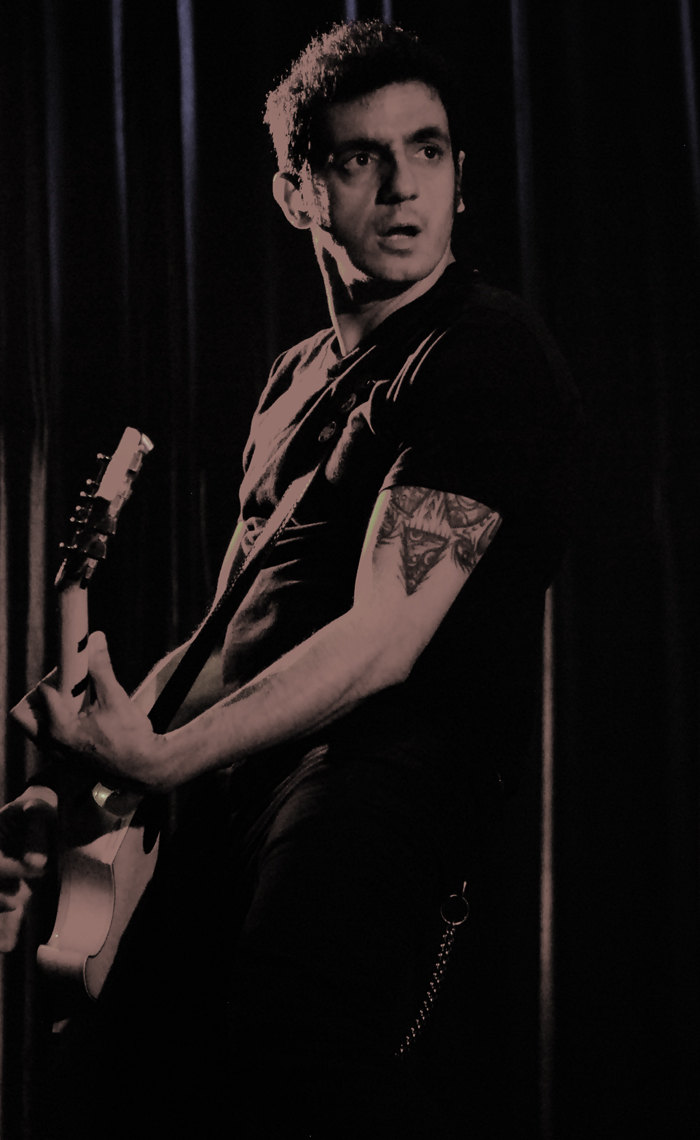
Hugo Diaz, guitarist

Trotsky Vengarán (also known as TKYVGN) is an Uruguay rock band formed in 1991, by Guillermo Peluffo, lead singer, Hugo Diaz and Ignacio Guasch on guitars, Guillermo "Cuico" Perazzo on drums and Marcelo Abreu on bass. Since the very beginning they decided they were going to play hard and melodic rock. They were influenced by groups such as Ramones, Beastie Boys, AC/DC, Sex Pistols and other 50s and 60s bands. Their style is clearly defined as punk rock, but with hardcore characteristics. The themes in their songs vary greatly, dealing with political, social, and cultural everyday issues. In 1994 they released their first album, called Salud, Dinero y Dinero (Health, Money and Money). ".

== Members ==
=== Current members ===
- Guillermo Peluffo - singer (1991–present)
- Hugo Diaz - guitar (1991–present)
- Guillermo Perazzo - drums (1991–present)
- Juan Pablo Granito Virè - Bass (2014 - present)

=== Past members ===
- Héctor Souto - bass (2001–2014)
- Marcelo Abreu - bass (1991–1995)
- Ignacio Guasch - guitar (1991–1995)
- Felipe Di Stefani - bass (1995–1997)
- Nicolás Pequera - bass (1997–2001)

== Discography ==
=== Studio albums ===
- Salud, dinero y dinero (1994)
- Clase B (1996)
- Yo no fui (1999)
- Durmiendo afuera (2001)
- Todo lo contrario (2002)
- 7 veces mal (2005)
- Hijo del rigor (2006)
- Volumen 10 (2008)
- Todo para ser feliz (2010)
- Colección Histórica (2012)
- Cielo Salvaje (2013)
- Relajo pero con orden (2016)
- Los Valientes (2018)
- Todo Está Por Pasar (2022)

=== Live albums ===
- Pogo (2003)
- No estamos solos (2007)
- Juegues donde juegues (2015)
- Una noche de rock en Medallo (2020)

=== Videoclips ===
- Reflejo (Salud, dinero y dinero)
- Mueve que te mueve (Salud, dinero y dinero)
- Un beso y una flor (Clase b)
- Tu lugar (Clase b)
- Por vos (Yo no fuí)
- Tocando fondo (Yo no fuí)
- Una vez más (Durmiendo afuera)
- Todo puede estar mucho peor (Todo lo contrario)
- Historias sin terminar (Todo lo contrario)
- Ni olvido ni perdón (Pogo)
- 3 veces mal (7 veces mal)
- La tierna pesadilla (Hijo del rigor)
- Noche alucinante (Volumen 10)
- Llueve (Volumen 10)
- Noche de Rock (Todo para ser feliz)
- Dejate Llevar (Todo para ser feliz)
- En el final (Cielo salvaje)
- Cielo salvaje (Cielo salvaje)
- Ellos me buscan a mí (Relajo pero con orden)

=== DVD ===
- Pogo (2003)
- No estamos solos (2008)
- Juegues donde juegues (2015)
- Relajo pero con orden (2016)
