= Cacho de la Cruz =

Uruguayan musician and television presenter (1937–2025)

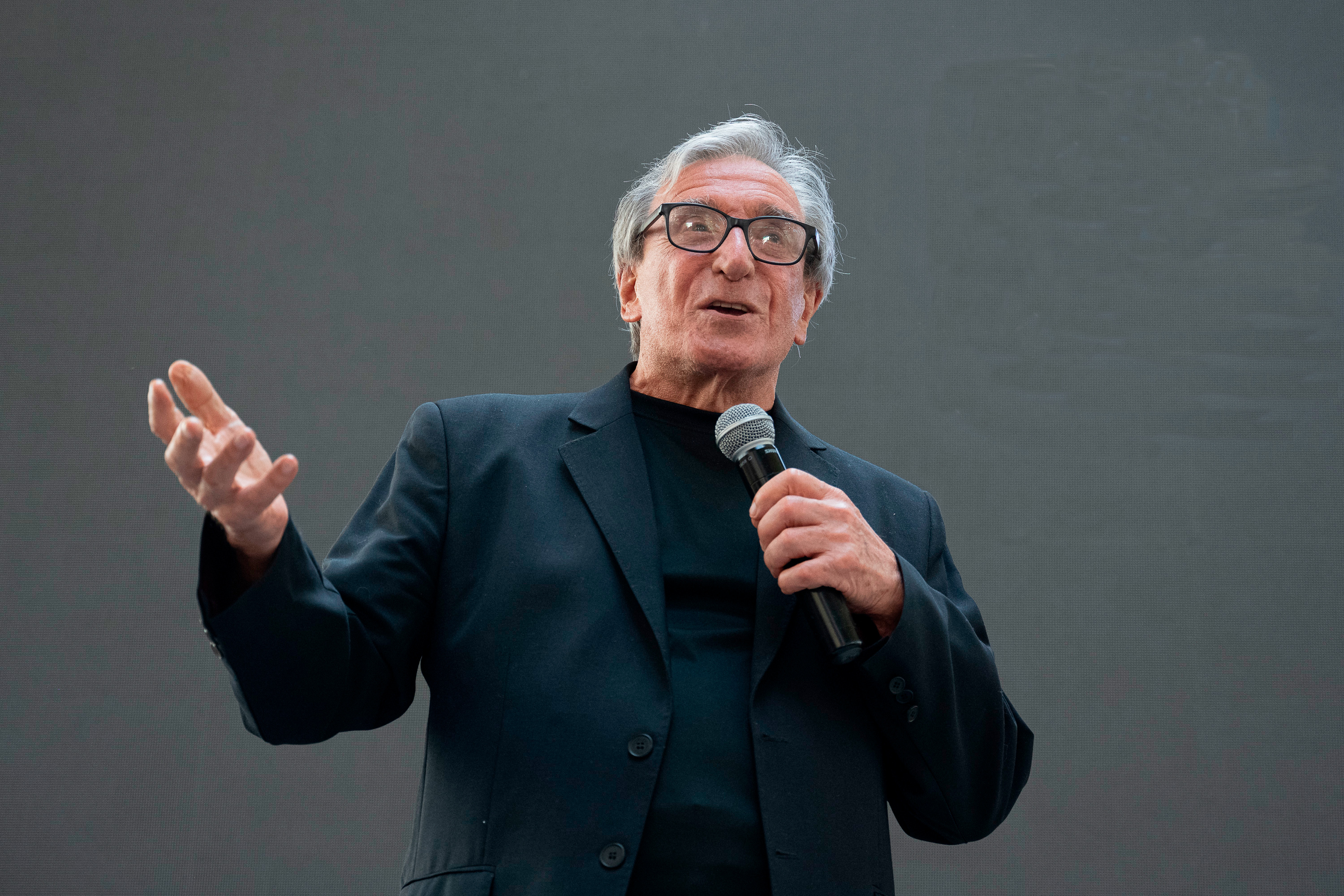
- De la Cruz in 2024
- Born: Arturo de la Cruz Feliciani; 8 May 1937; Buenos Aires, Argentina
- Died: 7 November 2025 (aged 88); Montevideo, Uruguay
- Occupations: Television presenter; actor; producer; comedian; musician
- Spouses: Hada Helena Reffino (m. 1962; div. 1990); Laura Martínez (m. 1990; div. 2009)
- Children: 4, including Maximiliano

Arturo de la Cruz Feliciani (8 May 1937 – 7 November 2025), better known by his stage name Cacho de la Cruz, was an Argentine-born Uruguayan television presenter, comedian and entertainer. Over a career spanning more than 45 years, he hosted several variety and comedy programs, becoming one of the most prominent figures in Uruguayan television.

== Early life and background ==
De la Cruz was born on 8 May 1937, in Buenos Aires, Argentina, to an Italian mother and a Moroccan father. Her father, whose surname was "De la Croix," was originally from Tangier.

In his adolescence, he studied advertising design, radio, fine arts, and trombone at the Escuela Técnica Raggio. After that, he began performing in cabarets and creating characters. He later started working at the newly inaugurated Channel 7 in Argentina with producer Jaime Yankelevich, where he appeared in Las tardes de conejito. At the age of 20, he emigrated to Uruguay.

== Career ==
In 1962, he was signed by the newly established Uruguayan channel Teledoce to host the variety and sketch show El show del mediodía alongside fellow comedian Alejandro Trotta. In the program, which aired for 46 years, he portrayed various characters in different sketches, including “Chichita,” a parody of Almorzando con Mirtha Legrand.

Among his most iconic and enduring programs were the midday hit El Show del Mediodía and the children's program Cacho Bochinche.

== Personal life ==
In 1962, he married Hada Helena Reffino, comic actress who contributed to the creation of Cacho Bochinche. The couple had three children: Daniella, Rodrigo, and Maximiliano (b. 1976). They divorced in 1990, and that same year De la Cruz married actress and television presenter Laura Martínez, with whom he had a son, Santiago (b. 2000).

De la Cruz died in Montevideo on 7 November 2025, at the age of 88 from COPD and COVID-19.

== Filmography ==
Year	Title	Role	Notes
1962–2008	El show del mediodía	Himself / Various	
1973–2010	Cacho Bochinche	Himself / Various	
2024	¿Quién es la máscara?	Himself/Lion King	Guest contestant
