= Agus Padilla =

Uruguayan singer (born 2001)

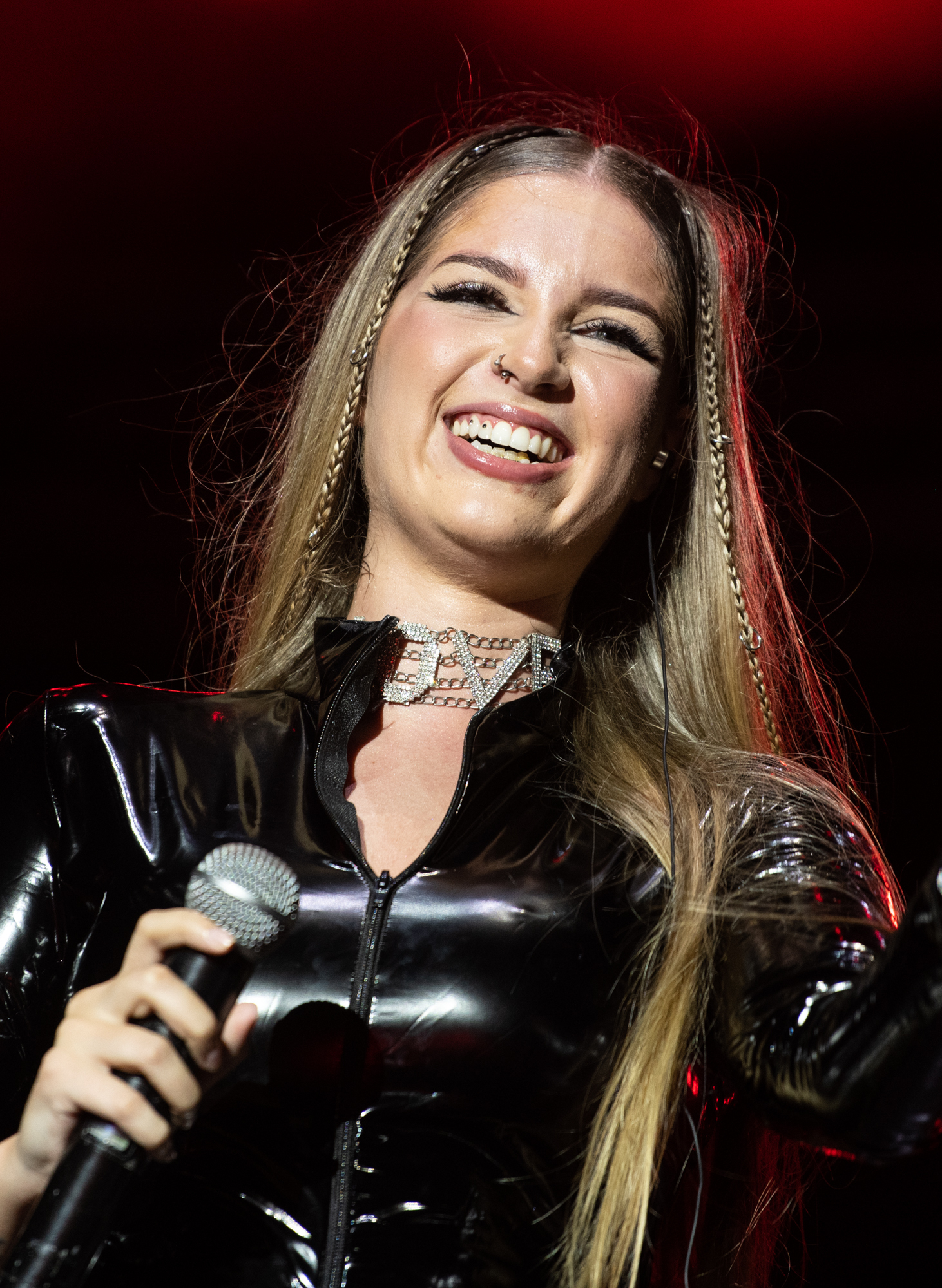
- Padilla in 2023

Background information
- Born: Agustina Padilla Fernández; December 10, 2001 (age 24); Brazo Oriental, Montevideo, Uruguay
- Genres: Reggaeton; RKT; urban pop
- Occupations: Singer; songwriter
- Instrument: Vocals
- Years active: 2017–present
- Labels: NES; Warner Argentina
- Partner: CristoRata (2025–present)

Agustina Padilla Fernández (born December 10, 2001), better known simply as Agus Padilla, is a Uruguayan singer, songwriter and television personality.

== Early life ==
She was born and raised in the Brazo Oriental barrio of Montevideo. Since she was little she was interested in music.

She started uploading covers at the young age of 12 to the Facebook platform.

In 2013, at just 12 years old, she made her television debut as a participant in the Uruguayan version of the program Pequeños Gigantes broadcast by Teledoce. In 2014 she created her YouTube channel, where she would later start sharing her music there.

== Career ==
=== Musical beginnings ===
In February 2017, she released her first single entitled «Ni tu amiga ni tu amante» ("Neither your friend nor your lover"), along with her video clip, where she gained recognition and popularity. In that year she was chosen to be the opening act for a Daddy Yankee concert in Uruguay.

=== New era and collaborations ===
In January 2018, she participated in the Calibash festival in Las Vegas, one of the most popular in Latin music. There she shared the stage with Ricky Martin, Jennifer López, Maluma, Ozuna and Bad Bunny.

In September she launched her first collaboration with the Argentine Ecko, entitled "Control". Two months later she released her new single "So Well", along with rapper Lit Killah. She was also the opening act for a Bad Bunny concert at the Summer Theater.

At the beginning of 2019, she signed with the record company Warner Music Group. At the same time she released "Papi" with the Argentine singer Papichamp. In November, she recorded in Buenos Aires the video clip for the urban song "Se prendió".

In 2020 she released three singles: the ballad "Por ti" on Valentine's Day, and the reggaeton songs "Me porto mal". and "Oh na na", the first in collaboration with the Uruguayan Pekeño 77.

After a year without uploading music, in July 2021 she returned with "Amor de dos", along with Puerto Rican Darkiel. That year she appeared on the Channel 10 reality series MasterChef Celebrity, being the 14th eliminated.

== Filmography ==
=== Television ===
Year	Title	Role	Notes
2013	Pequeños gigantes	Contestant	
2021	MasterChef Celebrity	Contestant	Eliminated 14th
2023	¿Quién es la máscara?	Herself/Sandal	Runner-up

== Discography ==
=== EPs ===
List of EPs, with selected details and certifications
Title	Studio album details-
Modo Perreo	Released: February 9, 2023; Label: Warner Music Argentina; Formats: Digital download, streaming

=== As lead artist ===
Año	Title	Positioning in lists		Album
Año	Title	ARG	URU	Album
2017	"Ni Tu Amiga Ni Tu Amante"	—	6	Non-album singles
2017	"Tu Boca"	—	13	Non-album singles
2017	"Mala"	—	14	Non-album singles
2017	"No Me Busques"	—	—	Non-album singles
2018	"Control" (with Ecko)	43	2	Non-album singles
2019	"Papi" (with Papichamp)	—	6	Non-album singles
2019	"Se Prendió"	89	6	Non-album singles
2020	"Por Ti"	—	—	Non-album singles
2020	"Me Porto Mal" (with Pekeño 77)	—	—	Non-album singles
2020	"Oh Na Na"	—	—	Non-album singles
2021	"Amor de Dos" (with Darkiel)	—	11	Non-album singles
2021	"Te Pienso" (with Franux BB)	—	—	Non-album singles
2022	"Infieles"	—	—	Non-album singles
2022	"Salgo Fresh"	—	—	Non-album singles
2022	"Me Tienta" (with Estani)	—	—	Non-album singles
2022	"Sin Ti" (with Migrantes and Lauta)	—	—	Non-album singles
2022	"Quiere Lo Mismo Que Yo" (Remix) (with Balbi el Chamako)	—	—	Non-album singles
2023	"Bellakeando" (with Marcianeke)	—	—	Modo Perreo
2023	"En la Disco" (with El Osito Wito)	—	—	Modo Perreo
2023	"Maldades" (with Soy Turista)	—	—	Modo Perreo
2023	"En la Disco" (with Mesita)	—	—	Modo Perreo
2025	"VIP" (with BK)	—	—	

==== As featured artist ====
Año	Title	Positioning in lists	Album
Año	Title	ARG	Album
2018	«Me Llama Todavía» (with Super Yei y Towy featuring Agus Padilla)	—	Euphoria
2018	«Tan Bien» (with Lit Killah featuring Agus Padilla)	22	Non-album singles
2021	«Pegaíta» (with Mesita featuring Agus Padilla)	—	Non-album singles
