= Mi enfermedad =

Single by Fabiana Cantilo
- Released: 1991
- Recorded: 1991
- Genre: Argentine rock
- Songwriter(s): Andres Calamaro

"Mi enfermedad" (lit. "My Disease") is a song written by Argentine singer-songwriter Andres Calamaro, originally recorded and released as a single separately by the Argentine rock singer Fabiana Cantilo 1991 and Calamaro's Spanish-Argentine band Los Rodríguez. The song was a favourite of Diego Maradona, who was facing drug-related problems back then. Reportedly journalists asked him if it was dedicated to him. In 2019 Mexican singer Alejandra Guzmán released a version of the song as a single.
