= Pablo Turturiello =

Uruguayan actor, musician and television personality (born 1999)

- Born: 18 January 1999 (age 27); Montevideo, Uruguay
- Occupations: Actor; singer; songwriter; television personality
- Years active: 2015–present
- Musical career
- Genres: Pop; Latin ballad
- Instrument: Vocals

Pablo Turturiello Rol (born 18 January 1999) is a Uruguayan actor, singer, songwriter and television personality who rose to prominence for his starring roles in the Buenos Aires Avenida Corrientes productions of the musicals Footloose, Rent and Heathers. He has also appeared in the miniseries Freeks (2023) and El amor después del amor (2023).

== Early life and education ==
Turturiello Rol was born in Montevideo on January 18, 1999, the son of accountants Gabriel Turturiello and Cecilia Rol. During his childhood he took piano, guitar and singing classes, and in 2015 he participated in Teledoce's singing competition television series Yo me llamo, in which he impersonated Adam Levine and finished in fourth place. After graduating from high school, he settled in New York to study drama at Marymount Manhattan College.

== Career ==
After returning from New York to Uruguay, in January 2020 he moved to Buenos Aires, Argentina to continue studying and audition for plays. In July he was announced as a singer partner of model Floppy Tesouro in the fifth season of the reality show Cantando por un Sueño.

In early 2021 he was part of the cast of the streaming play of the musical Rent, playing the role of Steve, and starred in the musical film Mr Gardel for Disney+, in which he played Frank Sinatra. In 2022 he launched his career as a soloist under the artistic name "Turtu", with the release of the single "Vivir sin vos".

In February 2022 he was part of the cast of the musical Lo Quiero Ya in Montevideo. In June he starred in the musical Footloose at the Teatro del Globo in Buenos Aires. His performance earned him a nomination for Best Male Lead Performance at the Hugo Awards. In April 2023 he played the musician Marcelo Moura in the Netflix biographical miniseries, El amor después del amor, and in June he was part of the cast of the Disney+ youth mystery series, Freeks, in the role of Coco Giacometti. In September he played Ciro in the Disney Channel youth series, Se tú misma.

In mid-2023 he was cast as Ram Sweeney in the Avenida Corrientes production of Heathers: The Musical, directed by Fernando Dente. In 2024 he returned to the cast of Rent but in the role of Roger Davis. In May he was announced as a panelist for the fourth season of Teledoce's ¿Quién es la máscara?, Uruguayan version of the music game show, The Masked Singer.

In 2025 he was cast as Eric for The Little Mermaid musical.

== Acting credits ==
=== Television ===
Year	Title	Role	Notes
2015	Yo me llamo	Himself	Contestant
2020	Cantando por un sueño	Himself	Contestant
2022	Limbo: hasta que lo decida	Guest	1 Episode
2023	El amor después del amor	Marcelo Moura	Main cast
2023	Freeks	Coco Giacometti	Main cast
2023	Sé tú misma	Ciro	Main cast
2024–2026	¿Quién es la máscara?	Himself	Panelist
2024–2025	100 Uruguayos Dicen Junior	Himself	Host

=== Theatre ===
Year	Title	Role	Notes
2022	Footloose	Ren McCormack	Teatro del Globo
2022	¡Lo quiero ya!	Kevin	Centro Tractatus
2023	Heathers, The Musical	Ram Sweeney	Teatro Ópera
2024	Rent	Roger Davis	Teatro Ópera
2025	La sirenita	Eric	Teatro Gran Rex

== Discography ==
=== Singles ===
- 2022: "Vivir Sin Vos"
- 2022: "Estuve Bien (O Mal)"
- 2022: "Fuego Lento"
- 2022: "No te registro"
- 2023: "Sombras"
