= Gabriel Migliónico =

Argentine footballer (born 1978)

Personal information
- Full name: Gabriel Maximiliano Migliónico Torres
- Date of birth: 20 January 1978 (age 48)
- Place of birth: Buenos Aires, Argentina
- Height: 1.77 m (5 ft 10 in)
- Position: Forward

Senior career*
Years	Team	Apps	(Gls)
1996–2000	Danubio		
2000–2001	Fénix		
2001–2005	Colón		
2005–2006	Fénix		
2007	Ñublense		
2008–2009	Unión de Sunchales		
2010–2011	CNI Iquitos		
- * Club domestic league appearances and goals as of 24 March 2020

Gabriel Maximiliano Migliónico Torres (born 20 January 1978) is an Argentine former footballer who played as a forward. His last club was Peruvian side CNI Iquitos.
