= Mayonesa (Chocolate song) =

2001 single by Chocolate

Single by Chocolate

from the album Mayonesa para Todo el Mundo
- Released: 2001
- Genre: Latin pop
- Length: 3:51 (Radio Edit)
- Label: Vale Music (Spain); Fonovisa; Warner Music

Music video
- "Mayonesa" (audio only) on YouTube

"Mayonesa" is a song by Uruguayan tropical pop band Chocolate. It was one of the summer hits in Spain in 2001.

The song was expected to be an international success comparable to that of "Lambada" and "Macarena". In Mexico and the United States, it was marketed by Fonovisa. In Colombia, Peru and Venezuela by Warner Music.

The band was awarded platinum and gold discs in a number of Latin America countries for this song.

This was the theme song of the second season of the Spanish reality show Gran Hermano (Telecinco, March–June 2001).

== Charts and sales ==
| Chart (2001) | Peak position |
|---|---|
| US Hot Latin Songs (Billboard) | 42 |
| US Regional Mexican Airplay (Billboard) | 40 |
| US Tropical Airplay (Billboard) | 27 |

=== Sales ===
| Region | Certification | Certified units/sales |
|---|---|---|
| Chile | — | 21,000 |
