= Piso 8 =

Uruguayan sitcom (2007)

- Genre: Sitcom; Cringe comedy
- Created by: Alan Goldman
- Written by: Alan Goldman; Jorge Maestro; Fernando Schmidt
- Directed by: Gerardo Mariani
- Starring: Patricia Wolf; Alfonso Tort; Mateo Chiarino; Verónica Caissiols; Isabel Schipani; Elena Brancatti; Matías Singer
- Country of origin: Uruguay
- Original language: Spanish
- No. of seasons: 1
- No. of episodes: 7

Production
- Executive producers: Anabela Pinilla; Virginia Altieri; María Laura García
- Production location: Montevideo
- Running time: 30–35 minutes

Original release
- Network: Channel 10
- Release: May 11 – June 22, 2007

Piso 8 (Spanish for '8th floor') is a Uruguayan television sitcom that aired on Channel 10 in 2007. The show follows the lives of public employees working in the eighth floor office of a ministry building.

== Premise ==
Set in the public office on the eighth floor of a ministry, Piso 8 follows the group of officials who work there, their complicated relationships between colleagues, and the adventures they experience during their work hours.

== Cast and characters ==
The show features an ensemble cast of characters, focusing on the officials in a public office and their relatives.

- Alfonso Tort as Maximiliano Caubarrere: Maximiliano is a spoiled man from a wealthy, down-on-his-luck family. He is married to Victoria and refuses to take things seriously most of the time.
- Patricia Wolf as Victoria de Caubarrere: Victoria is a structured and responsible official. She is married to Maximiliano, and she faces problems in her marriage from working together. She is of Jewish origin.
- Verónica Caissiols as Sandra Pasada: Sandra is a conceited and bossy official, who despite being Victoria and Maximiliano's assistant, most of the time refuses to work and serves people very poorly.
- Isabel Schipani as Irma Polio: Irma is the stern section chief of the eighth floor. Despite being very demanding, she hides her private party side very well.
- Mateo Chiarino as Tomás Darko: Tomás is the building's gossipy receptionist, who works to pay for his film studies. Openly gay, he is a confidant of the eighth floor employees.
- Norina Torres as Claudia Delgado: Claudia is a clumsy and insecure young woman with her body, who lives with her aunt Nelbia. She is a dreamer and is in love with Maxi.
- Elena Brancatti as Nelbia Delgado: Nelbia is Claudia's manipulative, bumpkin and cunning aunt, who always manages to get what she wants.
- Matías Singer as Lalo Castellar; Lalo is the lazy intern who started working on the eighth floor as part of a social integration program for young people.

== Production ==
=== Development and writing ===
The series was created by ORT Uruguay audiovisual communication graduate Alan Goldman, whose project for the series was the winner in the 2006 National Talent for Television contest organized by Channel 10. The script was written by Goldman himself, along with the screenwriter Jorge Maestro and Fernando Schmidt.

=== Filming ===
Principal photography took place in Montevideo. Apart from a few exterior scenes shot in the Cordón and Centro neighborhoods, the show was filmed in the main studio of SAETA Channel 10.
