= El show del mediodía =

Uruguayan TV show

El show del mediodía (The Midday Show) is the name of a Uruguayan TV show that has been on the air for over 40 years on channel 12. It was originally hosted by Cacho de la Cruz and Alejandro Trotta. In 1992, Trotta died of a heart attack and De La Cruz continued hosting the show.
