= Maximiliano de la Cruz =

Uruguayan actor and television presenter

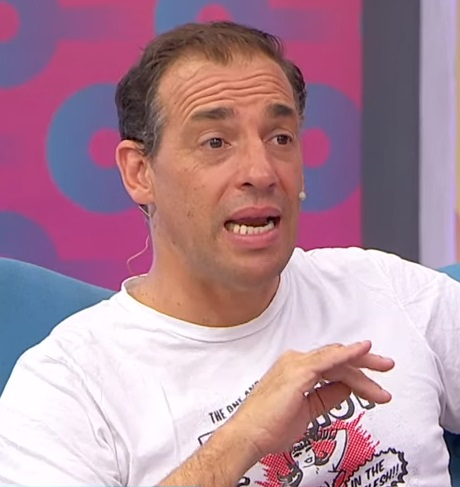
- Maximiliano de la Cruz in 2022.
- Born: Maximiliano Ricardo de la Cruz Reffino; March 11, 1976 (age 49); Montevideo, Uruguay
- Occupations: Television host; actor; comedian
- Years active: 1991–present
- Spouse: Bárbara
- Children: Candela, Santino
- Parent(s): Hada Helena Reffino; Cacho de la Cruz
- Awards: Golden Iris Award; ACE Award; Carlos Awards

Maximiliano Ricardo de la Cruz Reffino (born March 11, 1976) is a Uruguayan television host, actor and comedian. He has presented various television shows for Teledoce, including Yo me llamo (2014–2015), Me resbala (2015), Trato hecho (2019–2021), 100 uruguayos dicen (2021–2022) and ¿Quién es la máscara? (2022–present).

== Personal life ==
Maximiliano Ricardo de la Cruz Reffino was born on March 11, 1976, the son of Hada Helena Reffino and Argentine Uruguayan actor, comedian, presenter and producer Cacho de la Cruz. He has two children: Candelaria (born 2001) and Santino (born 2017).

== Career ==
He began his career in the media in the early 1990s presenting El Club de las Tortugas Ninja on Teledoce with Paola Bianco. Then they both hosted Maxidibujos on National Television, and Maxanimados again on Teledoce, which brought them national recognition. At the age of 18, he joined the comedy show Plop!, which was a spin-off of the well-known show Telecataplúm. In 2001, he joined the cast of El Show del Mediodía, remaining in it until it went off the air in 2008.

In the 2000s, he hosted other successful programs aired on Teledoce, such as Telemental, and the Uruguayan version of El casting de la Tele with Eunice Castro and filmed at the Ideas del Sur studios in Buenos Aires. In 2013, De la Cruz presented the comedy show Sinvergüenza, which featured comedians Luis Orpi and Luciana Acuña. For his performance in this show he won the award for Best Male Television Presenter at the 20th Iris Awards, held on September 17, 2014, at the National Auditorium.

In 2014, De la Cruz presented the talent show Yo me llamo, whose panel of judges was composed of Roberto Musso, Lea Bensasson and Omar Varela. In 2015, he presented its second season and participated in Me Resbala, the Uruguayan version of the French format Vendredi, tout est permis avec Arthur. In 2017, he played Damo Gómez in Quiero vivir a tu lado, a soap opera broadcast on El Trece.

In 2020, he returned to television to host the game show Trato Hecho, the local version of Deal or no deal. At first, he presented the spin-off featuring celebrities, but after Sebastián Abreu resigned from hosting the original format, De la Cruz took over it until 2021. Since 2020, he has also been part of the cast of the male version of the comedy show La culpa es de Colón. In 2021, he began hosting the revival of 100 Uruguayos Dicen, and in 2022 the singing contest ¿Quién es la Máscara?, an adaptation of the South Korean format Masked Singer.

In August 2022, it was announced that he would leave 100 Uruguayos Dicen and that starting with the season to be released in September he would be replaced by Christian Font. In May 2023, De La Cruz was confirmed as a celebrity participant for Bailando 2023.

== Filmography ==
=== Television ===
Year	Title	Role	Notes
1991–1992	El club de las Tortugas Ninja	Himself	Co-host
1993–1994	Maxidibujos	Himself	Co-host
1995–2000	Maxianimados	Himself	Co-host
1996	Plop!	Himself	Recurring character
1997	El teléfono	Himself	Co-host
1999	Guau!	Himself	Assistant
2001–2008	El show del mediodía	Himself	Host
2004	Humor a las brasas	Himself	Host
2007	La Oveja Negra		Special participation
2010	El casting de la Tele	Himself	Co-host
2010	Telemental	Himself	Host
	Cantando en la oficina	Himself	Co-host
2011	Los comediantes	Himself	Host
2013	Sos mi hombre	Gastón	Recurring character
2013	Sinvergüenza	Himself	Host
2014–2015	Yo me llamo	Himself	Host
2015	Me Resbala	Himself	Participant
2017	Quiero vivir a tu lado	Damián "Damo" Gómez	Recurring character
2019–2021	Trato Hecho	Himself	Host
2020–2026	La Culpa es de Colón	Himself	Host
2021–2022	100 Uruguayos Dicen	Himself	Host
2022–present	¿Quién es la máscara?	Himself	Host
2023	Bailando 2023	Himself	Competitor
2025	Tu cara me suena	Himself	Host

=== Film ===
Year	Movie	Rol	Director
2007	La despedida		Silvana Tomeo
2022	En la mira	Gustavo	Ricardo Hornos and Carlos Gil
2023	El duelo	Ramón Parodi	Augusto Tejada
2023	Society of the Snow	Lt Col Dante Lagurara	J. A. Bayona

== Awards and nominations ==
Year	Association	Category	Work	Result	Ref.
2010	ACE Award	Male revelation	Pour la gallery	Won	
2012	Carlos Award	Revelation	Smail	Won	
2014	Iris Awards	Best Male Television Presenter	Sinvergüenza	Won	
2014	Iris Awards	Golden Iris Award	Sinvergüenza	Won	
2014	VOS Awards	Best comedian	Stravaganza	Nominated	
2016	Iris Awards	Best Male Television Presenter	Yo me llamo	Nominated	
2016	Carlos Awards	Male standout figure	Pequeña gran mujer	Won	
