= Chocolate (band) =

Uruguayan band

- Origin: Montevideo, Uruguay
- Genres: Cumbia; Tropical; Latin
- Years active: 1997–2004
- Labels: Fonovisa Inc; Obligado Records
- Members: Paulo Fernández; Carlos Sosa; Claudio de la Fuente; Alejandro Scatone; Douglas Castillos

Chocolate was a Uruguayan band from Montevideo, specializing in cumbia music. They released 3 studio albums, and at their peak, became a huge success in South America, even touring the United States in 2001. In Argentina & Uruguay, they achieved 2 Gold & 3 Platinum discs.

== Members ==
- Paulo Fernández
- Carlos Sosa
- Claudio de la Fuente
- Alejandro Scatone
- Douglas Castillos

== History ==
Formed by producer Juan Carlos Cáceres, the five-member band first released material in 1997, an album entitled Cariñito. Their material was heavily influenced by local rhythms such as murga and candombe, but recognized internationally and referred to more frequently as cumbia. Their first efforts were usually covers of other artists' tracks. Lyrically, the content was restricted to uplifting themes, often making full use of a flirtatious attitude towards women, and the feelings associated with love and lust. Much use was made of local Uruguayan lunfardo. One band member commented that when they travelled internationally, "on the radio and at press conferences we have to explain the lunfardo", which was not fully understood outside their native Uruguay.

With the release of their Greatest Hits album in 2001, led by the single "Mayonesa", they achieved international success, which had previously been restricted to Uruguay and Argentina. This came following the move to Obligado Records and the opportunity to write their own material. The song became a hit throughout Latin America and Spanish-speaking North America, often referred to as one of the 'songs of the summer' of 2001. It reached #42 on the Billboard Hot Latin Tracks chart. Literally meaning mayonnaise, it likens the sensation of falling in love with the process of making the dressing, namely beating your heart as you would mayonnaise. The song was accompanied by a catchy dance routine.

The song's release was accompanied by a marketing campaign, which saw the band achieve success which few Uruguayan artists have experienced. They toured Argentina, Bolivia, Chile, Mexico, Spain and the United States. It was featured as the sound track to the Spanish version of Big Brother 2. In early 2002 they participated in the Viña del Mar International Song Festival in Chile.

The band disintegrated in 2002, as various members decided to form their own projects. The line-up had already changed from the original five, and that happened at the height of their success. Speculation surrounded the split, with accusations of bad feeling between the singers and manager Juan Carlos Cáceres. Remuneration was also allegedly an issue.

== Cultural references ==
Chocolate's music & lyrics, belonging to the cumbia style, were often thought of as being particularly attractive to the lower classes. Its use of lunfardo & sexual imagery contributed towards this, however cumbia villera has a much longer history within Latin America.

== Legacy ==
In 2016, the multinational telecommunications company Vodafone of Spain used the song "Mayonesa" as soundtrack in an ad for a new premium music service.

== Discography ==
- Cariñito 1997
- Fuego Contra Fuego 1998
- Grandes Éxitos 2001
