= Fabiana Cantilo =

Argentine singer-songwriter

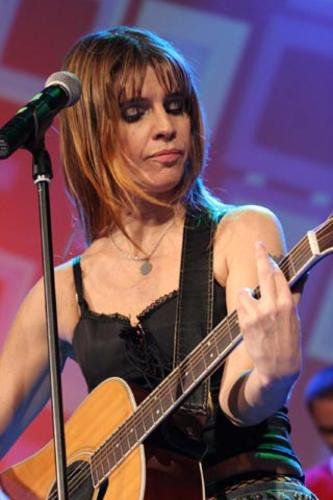

Background information
- Born: Fabiana Cantilo; March 3, 1959; Buenos Aires, Argentina
- Genres: Rock, pop
- Occupation: Singer
- Years active: 1974–present

Fabiana Cantilo (born March 3, 1959) is an Argentine singer-songwriter. She has sold more than 6 million records in her career.

== Biography ==
She was born in Buenos Aires, on March 3, 1959, daughter of Silvina Luro Pueyrredón and Gabriel Cantilo. Her first steps in music were at the age of 8 when she was already studying guitar. Her first great performance was at a school event at the Bayard Institute, where she interpreted "Balada para un loco" in front of Astor Piazzolla and Amelita Baltar, who were in the audience. Her cousin Patricia Bullrich introduced her to Argentine Rock, inviting her to a concert of Pescado Rabioso.

== Discography ==
=== Los Twist ===
- La Dicha en Movimiento (1983)

=== Soloist ===
- Detectives (1985)
- Fabiana Cantilo y los Perros Calientes (1988)
- Algo Mejor (1991)
  - Mi enfermedad
- Golpes al Vacío (1993)
- Sol en Cinco (1995)
- De Qué Se Ríen? (1998)
- Información Celeste (2002)
- Inconsciente Colectivo (2005)
- Hija del Rigor (2007)
- En la Vereda del Sol (2009)
- Ahora (2011)
- Superamor (2015)

=== Compilations ===
- Lo Mejor (1997)
- Libre Acceso: Ya No Creo en tu Amor (1997)
- Lo Mejor de Fabiana Cantilo (1999)
