= ¿Quién es la máscara? (Uruguayan TV series) =

Uruguayan talent reality television series

- Genre: Reality competition
- Based on: King of Mask Singer by Munhwa Broadcasting Corporation
- Presented by: Maximiliano de la Cruz
- Starring: Fabián Delgado; Sofía Rodríguez; Patricia Wolf; Pablo Turturiello; Fer Vázquez; Emir Abdul Gani
- Country of origin: Uruguay
- Original language: Spanish
- No. of seasons: 5
- No. of episodes: 60

Production
- Production company: Endemol Shine Group

Original release
- Network: Teledoce
- Release: May 5, 2022

¿Quién es la máscara? (Spanish: Who Is the Mask?, abbreviated as La máscara) is a Uruguayan reality singing competition television series that premiered on Teledoce on May 5, 2022. It is part of the Masked Singer franchise which began in South Korea and features celebrities singing songs while wearing head-to-toe costumes and face masks concealing their identities. Hosted by Maximiliano de la Cruz, the program employs Fabián Delgado, Sofía Rodríguez, Patricia Wolf and Pablo Turturiello, who serve as panelists who guess the celebrities' identities by interpreting clues provided to them throughout the season.

== Production ==
In November 2021, it was reported that Teledoce was negotiating to acquire the rights to Masked Singer, with the aim of producing it in 2022, as one of its big bets for its sixtieth anniversary. On January 3, 2022, the adaptation of the format was formally announced under the title of ¿Quién es la máscara?

Following the announcement of the series, it was confirmed that the permanent panel of "investigators" would consist of dancer and choreographer Emir Abdul Gani, presenter and journalist Sofía Rodríguez, singer and songwriter Fabián Delgado, and model and television personality Patricia Wolf. In late March, Maximiliano de la Cruz was confirmed as the host of the show.

In late April 2022, it was revealed that Camila Rajchman and Leticia Píriz would join the show to present behind the scenes and manage social networks respectively. The show's air date was confirmed through its official Instagram account for May 5, 2022. On October 27, 2022, the competition was renewed for a second series in 2023. It premiered on April 13.

In the last episode of the second season it was announced that the show had been renewed for a third season, and premiered on June 22, 2023. It was also revealed that Emir Abdul Gani would not return and would be replaced by singer-songwriter Fer Vázquez. In May 2024, the show was renewed for a fourth season. It was also announced that actor and singer Pablo Turturiello would replace Fer Vázquez as a panelist, and that Candelaria de la Cruz ―Maximiliano de la Cruz's daughter― would be the new behind-the-scenes presenter.

In January 2026 it was announced that the show had been renewed for a fifth season. It premiered on 5 March, with all the panelists from the previous season returning to their roles.

== Cast ==
Host and panel timeline
Cast Member	Seasons				
Cast Member	1 (2022)	2 (2023)	3 (2023)	4 (2024)	5 (2026)
Panel
Fabián Delgado	Main	Main	Main	Main	Main
Sofía Rodríguez	Main	Main	Main	Main	Main
Patricia Wolf	Main	Main	Main	Main	Main
Emir Abdul Gani	Main	Main			
Fer Vázquez			Main		
Pablo Turturiello				Main	Main
Host
Maximiliano de la Cruz	Main	Main	Main	Main	Main
Camila Rajchman	Main				

== Series overview ==
Series overview
Series	Contestants	Episodes	Originally released		Winner	Runner-up	Third place
Series	Contestants	Episodes	First released	Last released	Winner	Runner-up	Third place
1	18	16	5 May 2022	18 August 2022	Manuela da Silveira as "Monstruo"	Maria Jose Alvarez as "Gata Espejada"	Fer Vázquez as "Astronauta"
2	12	10	13 April 2023	15 June 2023	Annasofía Facello as "Caniche"	Agus Padilla as "Chancleta"	Florencia Infante as "Vaquita"
3	12	10	22 June 2023	31 August 2023	Luana as "Tigresa"	Freddy "Zurdo" Bessio as "Calavera"	Christian Font as "Brócoli"
4	13	10	17 June 2024	19 August 2024	Claudia Fernández as "Sapa"	Sole Ramírez as "Muñeca de Terror"	Frankie Lampariello as "Cono"
5	16	14	March 5, 2026	June 4, 2026	Vanesa Britos as "Mosca"	Meri Deal as "Frutillita"	Aldo Martínez as "Cebra"
