= Patricia Wolf =

Uruguayan model, actress and television personality (born 1974)

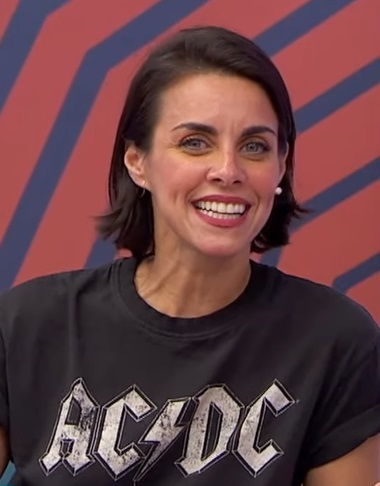
- Wolf in 2022
- Born: Patricia Erika Wolf; 2 July 1974 (age 51); Montevideo, Uruguay
- Occupations: Television personality; model; actress
- Spouses: Daniel Puig; Agustina Zuásnabar (m. 2018; div. 2021)
- Children: 1

Patricia Erika Wolf Fernández (born July 2, 1974) is a Uruguayan model, actress and television personality.

== Early life ==
Patricia Erika Wolf was born in 1974, the daughter of Miguel Hugo, a German immigrant who arrived in Uruguay at the age of four in the early 1940s, and his wife María Teresa. Her childhood was spent in barrio Buceo, in Malvín and in Ciudad Vieja. She has two half-siblings from her parents' previous marriages, and a sister.

== Filmography ==
Year	Title	Role	Notes
2007	Piso 8	Victoria	Main cast
2012–2013	Verano Perfecto	Herself	Co-host
2015	Me Resbala	Herself	Contestant
2018–2019	Algo contigo	Herself	Panelist
2019–2020	Cocineros Uruguayos	Herself	Host
2020	MasterChef Celebrity	Herself	Contestant; 13th Eliminated
2022–present	¿Quién es la máscara?	Herself	Panelist

== Personal life ==
She was married to businessman and presenter Daniel Puig, with whom she had her only son, Daniel Puig Wolf (born 1999). After divorcing, she began a relationship with Daniel Astori Sueiro, son of Danilo Astori, Vice President of the Republic from 2010 to 2015.

In May 2017, Wolf came out as bisexual, and confirmed that she was in a relationship with Agustina Zuásnabar, a businesswoman in the digital marketing sector. They got married on March 20, 2018, and celebrated their honeymoon in Tulum, Mexico. In early March 2021, it was confirmed that the couple had separated.

Wolf has supported environmental causes.
