= Fabián Delgado =

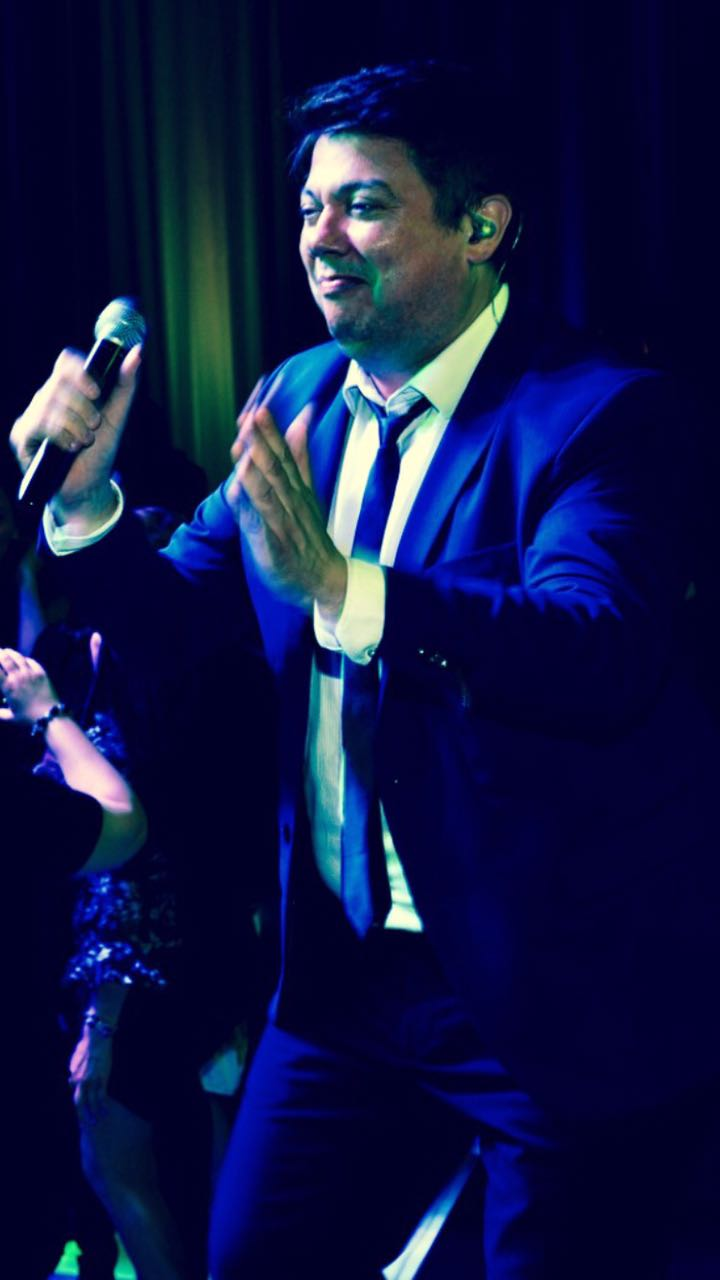
- Born: 3 December 1966 (age 59); Montevideo, Uruguay
- Occupations: Singer; songwriter; record producer; television personality
- Television: Poné Play (2020–present) ¿Quién es la máscara? (2022–present)
- Children: 2
- Musical career
- Genres: Tropical; Latin pop
- Instrument: Vocals
- Label: Sondor
- Website: fatadelgado.com

Fabián Delgado (born December 3, 1966) known as Fata Delgado is a Uruguayan singer, songwriter, record producer and television personality. He is better known for being the vocalist of the band Los Fatales since the late 1990s.

== Early life ==
Raised in the Cerro de Montevideo, he attended the Colegio Salesianos in La Teja.

== Career ==
At the age of 21, after an audition he was selected to join the carnival group Los Carlitos. For several years he was the vocalist for Karibe con K, an Uruguayan tropical music group originating in Montevideo.

In 1996 he formed the band Los Fatales, which achieved international recognition for singles such as "Pizza Muzarella" (1998), "Comadre, compadre" (1999) and "Apagón" (1999), for which he has toured internationally in South America, the United States and Australia. The group has won a Gold, Platinum and Double Platinum Record, as well as the Graffiti Award for best tropical music album in 2010, 2011 and 2017. In 2000, Delgado created the theater company dedicated to children's audiences "Fatales para Niños", which for more than 10 years has been renewing the show each season.

In November 2016, Delgado recorded the single "Pa' elante" together with Uruguayan goalkeeper from Rosario Central, Sebastián Sosa, for the album Otra Calle. Since December 2020, he has been part of the Teledoce game show, Poné Play, and since 2022 he has served as a panelist on ¿Quién es la máscara?, an adaptation of the South Korean format Masked Singer.

== Discography ==
- Masculino Femenino (1996)
- Capitanes de la alegría (1997)
- Atracción fatal (Pizza Muzzarella) (1998)
- Exportando alegría
- Revolución fatal (1999)
- Que monstruos (2000)
- Grandes éxitos (Bicho Bicho) (Sony Music, Argentina) (2001)
- Grandes éxitos (Sondor, Uruguay) (2002)
- La abuelita (2003)
- Segunda revolución (2004)
- Gaucho latino (2005)
- Fata les canta (Milideas Record) (2010)
- Alegría (Milideas Record) (2011)
- Los Fatales disco blanco (Milideas Record, Distribución MMG) (2012)
- Los Fatales en vivo (2014)
- Otra calle (Bizarro Records) (2016)

== Filmography ==
Year	Title	Role	Channel	Notes
2020–2021	Poné Play	Himself	Teledoce	Co-host
2022–present	¿Quién es la máscara?	Himself	Teledoce	Panelist

== Personal life ==
He is married since 2000 and has two children: María Victoria (born 2001) and Felipe. He is a Roman Catholic.
