= Sofía Rodríguez =

Uruguayan journalist and television presenter

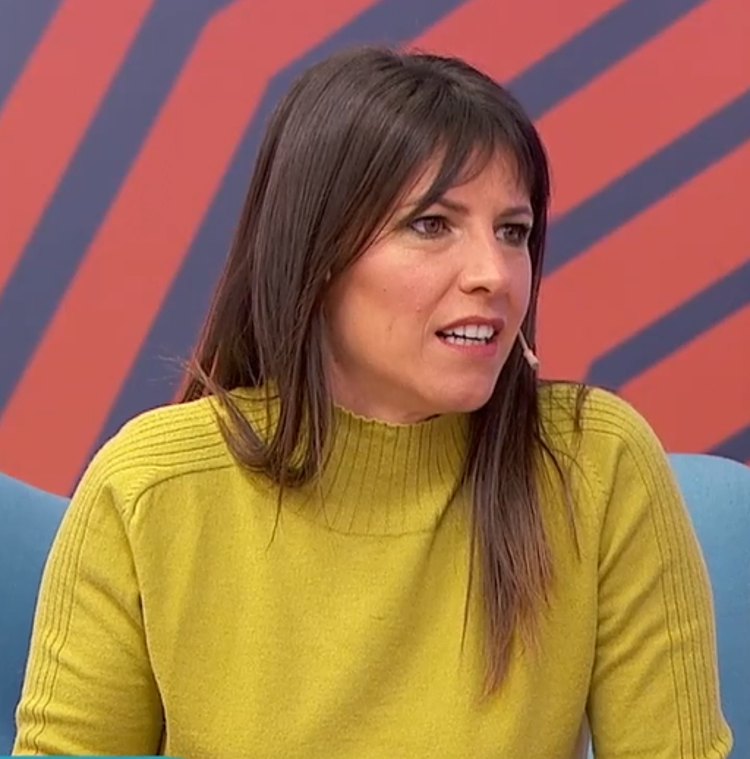
- Born: María Sofía Rodríguez Acosta y Lara; 29 September 1981 (age 44); Montevideo, Uruguay
- Occupations: Journalist; television presenter; producer
- Years active: 2002–present
- Partner: Tomás Bartesaghi (2021–present)
- Children: 1

María Sofía Rodríguez Acosta y Lara (born 29 September 1981) is a Uruguayan journalist and television presenter.

She began her career as a producer and later as a columnist on various television programs but rose to prominence in 2013 when she began presenting the reality show Maybelline Model Uruguay, and 2022, she has been a judge on the Teledoce musical competition show ¿Quién es la máscara?

== Career ==
At the age of 17, she began working at the Sarandí 890 radio station as a junior producer of the show Viva la tarde. While she was studying journalistic communication at the Universidad ORT Uruguay, she did an internship on the Channel 4 show Todo Punta during the summer season special.

In 2012 she joined the panel of the television newsmagazine program, Algo contigo. A year later, she made her television hosting debut, in the modeling reality show Maybelline Model Uruguay. The show, which ran for five series, brought her wide national recognition. In 2016 she began co-hosting the radio show Arde la ciudad. In June 2017 it was confirmed that Rodríguez would leave Algo contigo.

In April 2018, she began co-hosting the daytime talk show Vespertinas. In June 2021, both the radio show Arde la ciudad and Vespertinas were taken off the air. In February 2022, Rodríguez was announced as a judge for ¿Quién es la máscara?, Uruguayan version of the music game show, The Masked Singer, which premiered on Teledoce in May.

On 27 February 2023, Rodríguez began co-presenting Rompe paga with Juan Pablo Brianza on Radiocero.

== Personal life ==
In 2019, she divorced Leandro Gómez, after a marriage of almost ten years. In 2021 she announced her relationship with chef and entrepreneur Tomás Bartesaghi. On February 14, 2024, Rodríguez announced that she was pregnant with the couple's first child. On August 24, 2024, Rodríguez gave birth to their son, Borja.

== Filmography ==
Television
Year	Title	Role
2003–2006	Los viajes del 12	Producer
2010–2011	Día perfecto	Panelist
2012–2017	Algo contigo	Panelist
2013–2017	Maybelline Model Uruguay	Presenter
2013–2016	Buen Día Uruguay	Columnist
2018–2021	Vespertinas	Co-presenter
2022–present	¿Quién es la máscara?	Panelist

Radio
Year	Station	Show	Role
2016–2021	Radiocero	Arde la ciudad	Co-presenter
2023–present	Radiocero	Rompe paga	Co-presenter
