= Camila Rajchman =

Uruguayan singer and songwriter (born 1994)

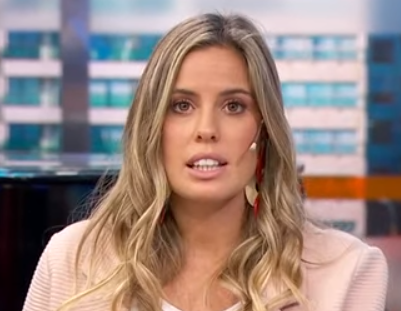
- Rajchman in 2019
- Born: Camila Rajchman Goldfarb; November 26, 1994 (age 31); Montevideo, Uruguay
- Education: Universidad ORT Uruguay
- Occupations: Singer; songwriter; TV host
- Years active: 2014-present
- Partner: Santiago Urrutia (2023–2025)
- Family: Chil Rajchman (grandfather)
- Musical career
- Genres: Cumbia pop
- Instrument: Vocals

Camila Rajchman Goldfarb (born 26 November 1994) is an Uruguayan singer, songwriter and television personality. She is best known for being the vocalist of the cumbia-pop band Rombai from 2014 to 2016.

== Life and career ==
=== 1994–2013: Early life and education ===
Camila Rajchman was born in Montevideo on November 26, 1994, into a Jewish family. She is the youngest of four daughters of entrepreneur José Rachman and schoolteacher Gabriela Goldfarb. She is also the granddaughter of Chil Rajchman, a Polish Holocaust survivor who settled in Uruguay after World War II.

She completed her primary and secondary education at Woodlands School, a private school in the Carrasco neighborhood, and later attended Escuela Integral, a Jewish institution, for her high school education. After graduating, she enrolled at Universidad ORT Uruguay where she studied for a degree in communication and audiovisual technology.

=== 2014–2015: Breakthrough with Rombai ===
While pursuing her university studies in late 2014, she formed the cumbia pop band Rombai with Fer Vázquez and some fellow students. Their debut single, “Locuras contigo,” quickly became a summer hit, amassing millions of views on YouTube and playing a key role in bringing the cumbia pop style into the mainstream of the Río de la Plata region.

Throughout 2015, the group released several chart-topping singles, toured across various Latin American countries, and appeared on numerous television programs and events, further boosting their popularity. They also performed joint concerts and had songs featuring fellow Uruguayan band Márama. In January 2016 the band released their first album De Fiesta.

In March 2016, Rajchman announced her departure from Rombai, and on April 29 of that year, she performed for the last time with the group at Luna Park in Buenos Aires. She was later replaced as vocalist by Argentine singer Emilia Mernes. In June 2016, months after her departure from the band, Marama - Rombai - El viaje was released, a tour film showcasing the joint tour of both bands.

=== 2016–2022: Departure from Rombai and television career ===
After her departure from Rombai in March 2016, she began a career in television. From May to August of that year, she served as a panelist on the Argentine reality television show Gran Hermano. Between January and March 2017, during the austral summer season, she appeared as a panelist on the Uruguayan morning show Desayunos informales, temporarily replacing Andy Vila. In October 2017, she formally joined the program as an on-location reporter. The following summer, she became a co-presenter of the travel program Súbete a mi moto in its summer edition, alongside Rafael Villanueva.

In August 2018, she introduced her new musical group, Blonda, as its lead vocalist, releasing the debut single “Actitud”, followed by “Re-lléname a besos” in December of the same year. At the 23rd Premios Iris, she won the award for Best Social Media Communicator and was nominated for Television Breakthrough of the Year. In May 2021, she worked as the digital host of the culinary competition Fuego Sagrado during its first season. In 2022, she presented behind-the-scenes content for the first season of ¿Quién es la máscara?, the Uruguayan version of The Masked Singer. That same year, she made her debut as a television host on the youth game show El Último Pasajero, alongside Jorge Echagüe.

In July 2022, she announced her departure from Desayunos informales and, following the season finales of El Último Pasajero and ¿Quién es la máscara?, confirmed her withdrawal from television. In November, she began hosting the program Weno que pasó on the streaming channel Aweno TV.

=== 2023–present ===
In November 2023, following a reconciliation after several years of estrangement from her former Rombai co-lead vocalist Fer Vázquez, they released a new single titled “Cumbia cheta”, named after the musical genre associated with the band. On 3 January 2024, they released a second collaboration, “Hasta el Amanecer”. In both tracks, she was featured under the name “Cami Raj”.

== Filmography ==
=== Film roles ===
| Year | Title | | Role | Notes |
|---|---|---|---|---|
| 2016 | (Uruguay) | Marama - Rombai - El viaje | Herself | Documentary film |

=== Television roles ===
| Year | Title | Role |
|---|---|---|
| 2016 | Gran Hermano Argentina | Season 9, Panelist |
| 2017–2022 | Desayunos informales | Reporter |
| 2018 | Súbete a mi moto–Summer edition | Co-presenter |
| 2021 | Fuego Sagrado | Social media correspondent |
| 2022 | El Último Pasajero | Co-presenter |
| 2022 | ¿Quién es la máscara? | Backstage host |
| 2023 | ¿Quién es la máscara? | Guest contestant; 1 episode |
