= Fer Vázquez =

Uruguayan singer

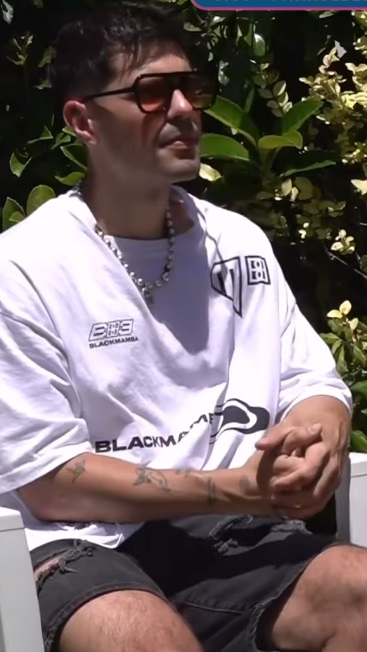
- 2023
- Born: Fernando Vázquez Rodríguez; May 15, 1994 (age 31); Montevideo, Uruguay
- Occupations: Singer; Songwriter
- Years active: 2014–present
- Known for: Being the vocalist of Rombai
- Musical career
- Genres: Cumbia pop
- Instrument: Vocals

Fernando Vázquez Rodríguez most known as Fer Vázquez (born 15 May 1994) is an Uruguayan singer, songwriter and television personality, known for being the vocalist of the cumbia pop band Rombai since 2014.

== Career ==
In 2016 he participated in the reality show Bailando por un Sueño, in its 11th edition. That same year he participated acting in the documentary film Marama - Rombai - El viaje, personifying himself. On February 26, 2017, he performed as vocalist of Rombai at the Quinta Vergara Amphitheater, participating for the first time in the Viña del Mar International Song Festival.

Realities shows
Year	Name	Role	Notes
2016	Bailando 2016	Contestant	Abandoned
2022	¿Quién es la máscara? (season 1)	Astronaut	3rd place
2023	El Hotel De Los Famosos (season 2)	Guest	Episode 3
2023	¿Quién es la máscara? (season 3)	Investigator	

== Discography ==
=== With Rombai ===
- 2014: «Locuras contigo»
- 2015: «Yo también»
- 2015: «Curiosidad»
- 2015: «Noche loca» ft. Márama
- 2015: «Adiós»
- 2015: «Segundas intenciones»
- 2015: «Yo te propongo»
- 2016: «Reencuentro»
- 2016: «Olvida ese hombre»
- 2016: «Enamorarnos no»
- 2016: «Perdí tu amor»
- 2016: «Abrazame»
- 2016: «Cuando se pone a bailar»
- 2017: «Sentí el sabor»
- 2017: «Una y otra vez»
- 2017: «Besarte»
- 2017: «Que rico que baila» ft. Márama
- 2018: «Me voy»
- 2019: «Me voy (Remix)» ft. Abraham Mateo and Reykon
- 2019: «2 Pa' 2
- 2019: «Piénsalo» ft. MYA
- 2019: «Don Juan» ft. Ventino
- 2019: «Ganitas»

=== Singles ===
- 2014: «Una noche contigo» ft. Márama
- 2016: «Te conozco» ft. Márama
- 2015: «Aventura» ft. Niko Falero
- 2015: «Déjate Llevar»
- 2015: «Tenemos que hablar»

=== With the stage name Rombai ===
- 2019: «Japón»
