= Rombai =

Uruguayan cumbia band

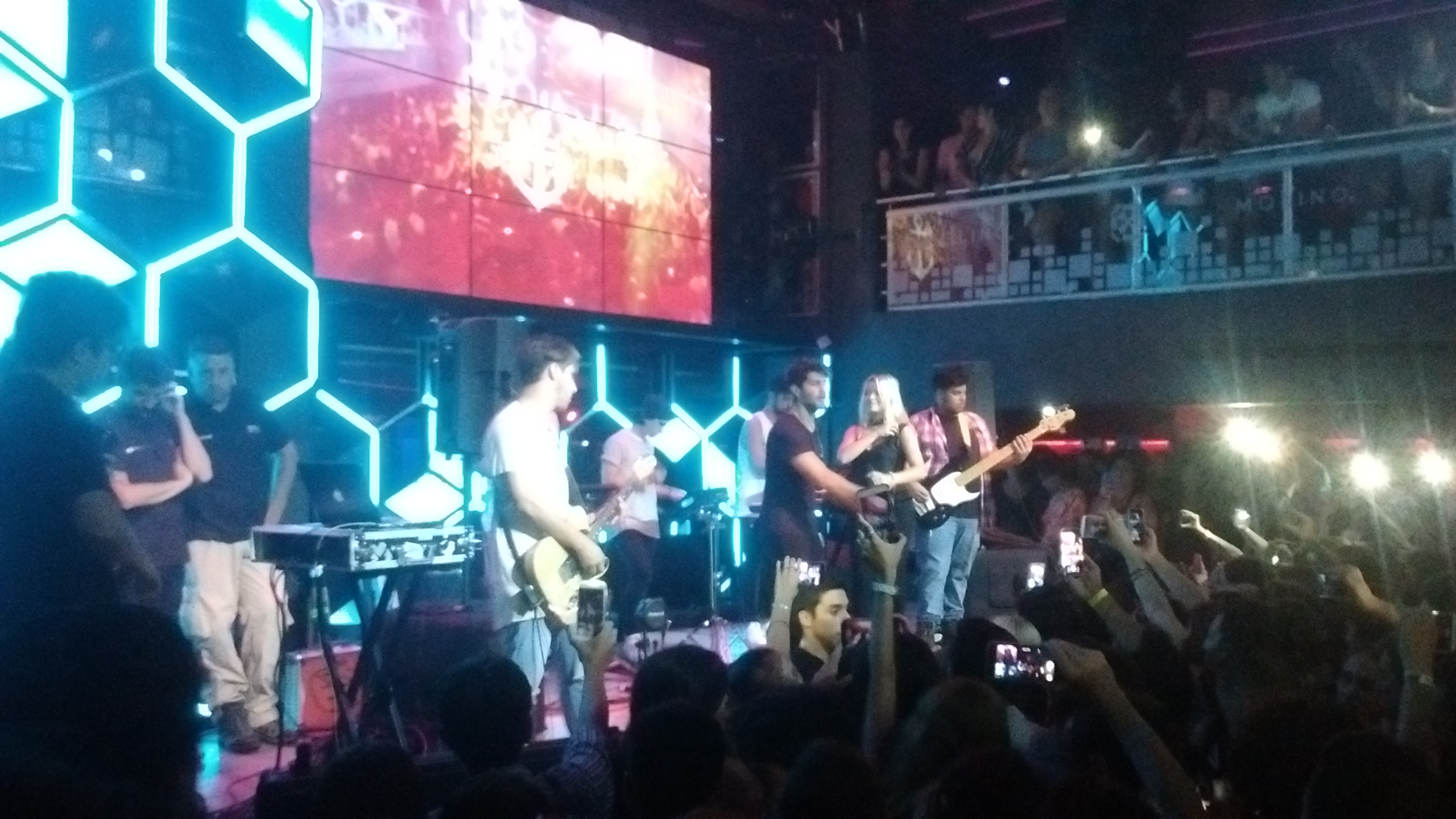

Background information
- Origin: Montevideo, Uruguay
- Genres: Cumbia; Cumbia pop
- Years active: 2014–present
- Labels: Sony Music Latin
- Members: Fernando Vázquez; Nicolás González; Juan Martino
- Past members: Camila Rajchman; Tomás Narbondo; Nathalie "Nata" Rubinstein; Valentina "Vala" Nirenberg; Rodrigo Molina; Agustín Correa; Emilia Mernes; Valeria Henríquez; Megumi Bowles
- Website: Official website

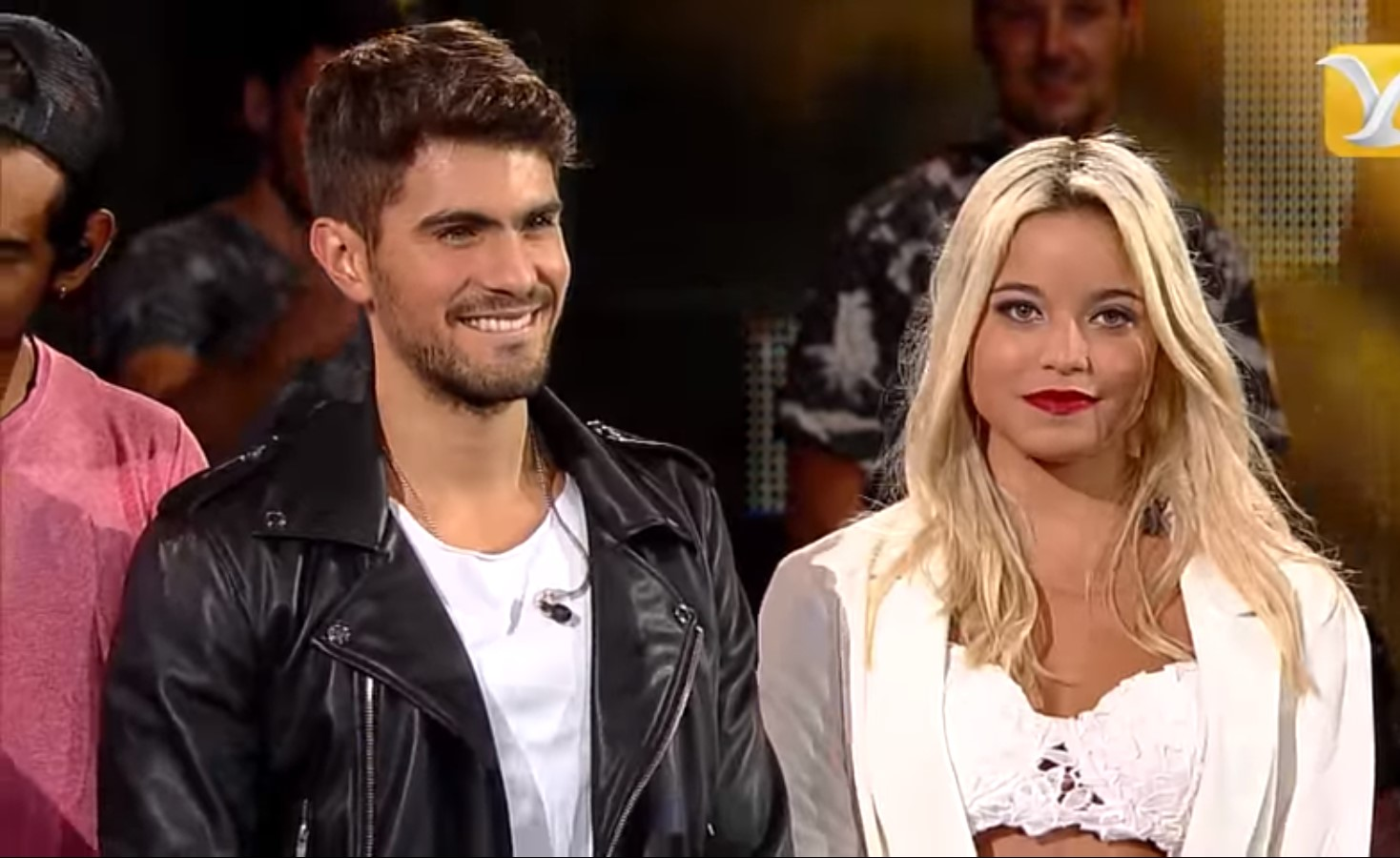
Fernando Vázquez and Emilia Mernes performing in the 2017 Viña del Mar International Song Festival

Rombai is an Uruguayan band formed in Montevideo, Uruguay in 2014. The group is composed of Fernando Vázquez, Nicolás González and Juan Martino; former members Camila Rajchman, Tomás Narbondo, Nathalie "Nata" Rubinstein, Valentina "Vala" Nirenberg, Rodrigo Molina, Agustín Correa, Emilia Mernes, Valeria Henríquez, Megumi Bowles departed from the group.

In less than a year, it had a great impact in Uruguay and Argentina and became one of the three most listened artists of 2015 on Spotify in Argentina. The name of the band comes from a game that ex-vocalist Camila Rajchman's grandfather played.

In June 2016, its biographical documentary film, Marama - Rombai - El viaje was released, which also portrayed the history of the band Márama. The film was also released in Argentina.

== History ==
The members of the band met in 2013 studying communication at the ORT University, and in December 2014 they decided to form Rombai as an excuse "to meet and have fun".

On December 27, 2014 they released their first single on YouTube, titled Locuras contigo, which became very popular; This was what motivated them to continue with the band but not as a hobby, but as a job.

On February 3, 2015, the band released their second single, Yo también, whose video clip had thousands of views on YouTube. A short time later they signed a contract with Claro, to be able to promote their music. On March 13, 2015 they released their third single, titled Curiosidad. On May 13 of that same year they released the song Noche loca, featuring Márama. On July 31, 2015 they released their fifth single, titled Adiós; The video clip exceeded 47 million views, allowing it to become on the Vevo YouTube platform. On October 17 they released their sixth single, Segundas intenciones. On December 23, 2015 they released their seventh single, titled Yo te propongo.

In 2015, drummer Tomás Narbondo was expelled after having "made a mistake" with Fer Vázquez. Through Instagram, Narbondo stated "It was not my decision, I made a mistake and paid dearly".

On March 15, 2016, vocalist Camila Rajchman announced that she would be departing the group. On November 7 of that year, Vázquez confirmed on social networks that the Argentine Emilia Mernes would be the one to sing alongside him, after 8 months singing solo. In late April and early May of that year, Rombai performed at the Luna Park Stadium, with Márama, where the group released two new songs, Reencuentro and Abrázame. On November 25, it released the song Cuando se pone a bailar which has become its most successful song on the YouTube platform, breaking its own records.

On February 26, 2017, they performed at the closing of the Viña del Mar International Song Festival, at the Quinta Vergara Amphitheater, with Márama.

In 2019, after the departure of Emilia Mernes, the vocalists were Fer Vázquez, the Colombian Valeria Henríquez and the Bolivian Megumi Bowles. However, under certain circumstances Valeria was forced to distance herself indefinitely from the group, so Megumi and Fer continued to lead the group.

== Discography ==
- 2015: «De Fiesta»
- 2016: «De Fiesta (Deluxe Edition)»

== Singles ==
- 2014: «Locuras contigo»
- 2015: «Yo también»
- 2015: «Curiosidad»
- 2015: «Noche loca» ft. Márama
- 2015: «Adiós»
- 2015: «Segundas intenciones»
- 2015: «Yo te propongo»
- 2016: «Reencuentro»
- 2016: «Olvida ese hombre»
- 2016: «Enamorarnos no»
- 2016: «Perdí tu amor»
- 2016: «Abrázame»
- 2016: «Cuando se pone a bailar»
- 2017: «Sentí el sabor»
- 2017: «Una y otra vez»
- 2017: «Besarte»
- 2017: «Que rico baila» ft. Márama
- 2018: «Me voy»
- 2019: «Me voy (Remix)» ft. Abraham Mateo y Reykon
- 2019: «2 Pa' 2»
- 2019: «Ganitas»
- 2019: «Japón»
- 2020: «Te Va Doler»
- 2020: «Te Extraño :(»
