= Manuela da Silveira =

Uruguayan actress, comedian and television host

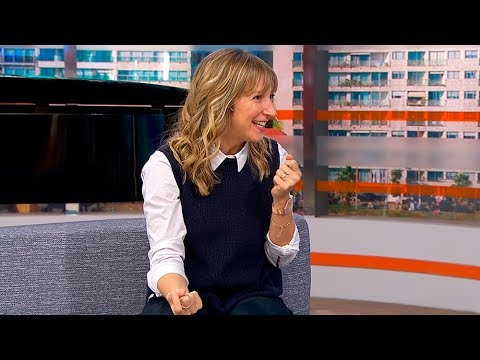
- Born: María Manuela da Silveira Baliño; 3 February 1982 (age 44); Montevideo, Uruguay
- Education: Catholic University of Uruguay
- Occupations: Actress; comedian; television host
- Father: Jorge da Silveira
- Website: manudasilveira.com

María Manuela da Silveira Baliño (born 3 February 1982) is a Uruguayan actress, comedian and television host.

== Early life and education ==
Da Silveira was born and raised in Montevideo, Uruguay, to Jorge da Silveira (born 1943), a journalist, and Elena Baliño, a lawyer. She has two siblings, Jorge and Florencia. She attended Ivy Thomas Memorial School in Pocitos and studied communication sciences at the Catholic University of Uruguay and finished her career at the Universidad Iberoamericana in Mexico years later.

== Theater career ==
She started performing stand-up comedy at theatres and small clubs in some "one-man" shows or accompanied by comedians like Emilia Díaz, among others. Also, she was a member of the play Muchacháchara, of comedy monologues, in the UnderMovie.

In 2010, she co-starred in the stand-up "Las tres gracias" and "Mujeres de Cháchara", with Emilia Díaz, Verónica Perrotta, Angie Oña and Rafael Cotelo at the Undermovie theater. In 2013, she starred in the solo show "De buen humor", directed by Angie Oña and Emilia Díaz, where she showed her vision of the world in a humorous tone since she was a child until today.

In 2018, Da Silveira joined "Le Prénom" along with a first-rate cast made up of Franklin Rodríguez, Jorge Esmoris, Gabriela Iribarren and Ignacio Cardozo. It was directed by Mario Morgan. In 2019 she returned to the theater where she starred in "Crecer o Reventar" at the Undermovie theater. It was directed by the actress Victoria Césperes.

== Television career ==
Da Silveira began her career on television as a scriptwriter for comedy shows on Televisa, in Mexico, while she was finishing her studies. On her return to her native country, she had a brief passage through advertising. She was also a writer for the Punto Ogilvy agency, and a scriptwriter and producer for the Teledoce television channel in the early 2000s. Her first role in front of the cameras was as a correspondent in the entertainment program Telemental, on the same channel.

In the early 2010s, she established herself on television when she began to co-host the successful comedy and entertainment program "Sonríe, te estamos grabando", along with hosts Cecilia Bonino and Pablo Fabregat, also on Teledoce. After her departure from Teledoce, from July 2015 to 2016 she hosted the comedy program Parentela, on Canal 4, which included the participation of comedians such as Néstor Guzzini, Luciana Acuña, Piero Dattole and Dianna Liberman. In each program there were special guests and the first was the Uruguayan musician Ruben Rada.

After living for more than a year in Buenos Aires and moving away from the media, in 2017 she returned to Uruguayan television and to Teledoce as a panelist on the morning show Desayunos informales, hosted by Victoria Zangaro and Jorge "Coco" Echagüe. She is in charge of reviewing news about the show and performs comedian segments alone or with Marcel Keoroglian, such as "Marta, Monte's wife" and "El Niño Doblaje". On December 31, 2018, she decided to leave the program.

In 2018, for a few months, she co-hosted, together with Juan Hounie and Varina De Cesare, the program "La Columna de la Gente". In 2020, she joined the female cast of the comedy show La culpa es de Colón, along with Catalina Ferrand, Luciana Acuña, Jimena Vázquez and Lucía Rodríguez, an adaptation of an original American format. Two years later she returned to the channel participating in the program ¿Quién es la máscara?, adaptation of the South Korean format, under the character of "Monster". Manuela turned out to be the winner of the competition after being in nine episodes.

In February 2024 she was announced as a panelist for Teledoce's television mystery music game show, Veo cómo cantas.

== Other projects ==
In 2012 she presented her first autobiography called "Manu: de 0 a 30 - 30 años de pastafrola" (Manu: from 0 to 30 - 30 years of pastafrola), with memories of her childhood and reflections on love, moving, gastronomy and Uruguay, among other topics. In 2015 presented the book "Comer y reír: manual para acercarse a la cocina con alegría" (Eat and laugh: manual to approach the kitchen with joy), co-authored with the cook and businesswoman Ximena Torres.

== Filmography ==
=== Television ===
Year	Title	Role	Channel
2006	Telemental	Correspondent	Teledoce
2011–2014	Sonríe, te estamos grabando	Co–host	Teledoce
2015–2016	Parentela	Host	Canal 4
2017–2018	Desayunos informales	Panelist	Teledoce
2018	La columna de la gente	Co–host	Teledoce
2020	La culpa es de Colón	Comedian	Teledoce
2022	¿Quién es la máscara?	Participant (as Monster, winner)	Teledoce
2024–present	Veo como cantas	Judge	Teledoce

== Personal life ==
At the beginning of January 2023, da Silveira and her partner, Diego García Scheck, announced their first pregnancy.
