= Desayunos informales =

Uruguayan morning television show

- Genre: Morning news and talk
- Presented by: Ignacio Martirené; Victoria Zangaro; Jorge Echagüe
- Country of origin: Uruguay
- Original language: Spanish

Production
- Production locations: Teledoce Headquarters, Montevideo
- Running time: 210 minutes
- Production company: Teledoce

Original release
- Network: Teledoce
- Release: July 13, 2015 – present

Related
- Día perfecto (2010–2015)

Desayunos informales (Spanish: Informal breakfasts) is an Uruguayan morning television show that is broadcast on Teledoce. It debuted on July 13, 2015 and is presented by Ignacio Martirené, Victoria Zangaro and Jorge Echagüe.

Desayunos Informales has won the Iris Award for best magazine show three consecutive times (2016, 2017, 2018).

== Format ==
The show has two parts, called "First Morning" and "Second Morning".

- First Morning airs from 8:00 to 10:00 a.m. In it, journalistic issues, such as politics and sports are discussed, in addition to interviews. It is hosted by Ignacio Martirené.
- Second Morning airs from 10:00 to 12:00 p.m. In it, news about entertainment is reported, and there are interviews, games and humor. It is hosted by Victoria Zangaro and Jorge Echagüe.

== On-air staff ==
- Ignacio Martirené (Anchor of the "First Morning"; 2021–present).
- Victoria Zangaro (Co-Anchor of the "Second Morning"; 2015–present).
- Jorge Echagüe (Co-Anchor of the "Second Morning"; 2017–present).
- Lucía Brocal (Panelist of the "Second Morning"; 2015–present).
- Leonardo Haberkorn (Panelist of the "First Morning"; 2020–present).
- Nicolás Batalla (Panelist of the "First Morning"; 2020–present).
- Paula Scorza (Panelist of the "First Morning"; 2021–present).
- Lucía Rodríguez (Panelist of the "Second Morning"; 2021–present).
- Diego Jokas (Sports reporter in the "First Morning"; 2021–present).
- Camila Rajchman (Reporter in the "Second Morning"; 2017–present).
- Martín Angiolini (Musician of the "Second Morning"; 2015–present).
- Marcel Keoroglián "Montelongo" (Humorist of the "Second Morning"; 2015–present).

=== Former on-air staff ===
- María Noel Marrone (Anchor of the "First Morning"; 2015–2020).
- Alejandro Figueredo (Co-Anchor of the "Second Morning"; 2015–2017).
- Jaime Clara (Panelist of the "First Morning"; 2015–2019).
- Juan Miguel Carzolio (Panelist of the "First Morning"; 2015–2020).
- Facundo Macchi (Panelist of the "First Morning"; 2020–2021).
- Juan Hounie (Panelist of the "First Morning"; 2019–2020).
- Rosario Castillo (Panelist of the "Second Morning"; 2018–2019).
- Pablo Fabregat (Panelist of the "First Morning"; 2015–2018).
- Manuela da Silveira (Panelist of the "Second Morning"; 2017–2018).
- Andy Vila (Panelist of the "Second Morning"; 2015–2017).
- Martín Sarthou (Panelist of the "First Morning"; 2015–2016).
- Federico Buysan (Sports reporter in the "First Morning"; 2018–2020).
- Sebastián González (Humorist of the "Second Morning"; 2016–2017).
