= Forer (surname) =

Forer is a surname. Notable persons with that name include:

- Bertram Forer (1914–2000), American psychologist, father of the Forer effect
- Jane F. Gentleman (born 1940), American-Canadian statistician
- June Foray (1917-2017), born June Lucille Forer, American voice actress
- Joseph Forer (1910–1986), American attorney who helped fight against segregation
- Laurenz Forer (1580–1659), Swiss Jesuit theologian
- Oded Forer (born 1977), Israeli politician
