= Miss Universo Uruguay 2014 =

- Date: January 19, 2014
- Presenters: Daniel Alejandro; Carolina Gonzalez
- Venue: Hotel Punta del Este Arenas, Punta del Este, Uruguay
- Broadcaster: YouTube, Vimeo
- Entrants: 15
- Placements: 5
- Winner: Johana Riva
- Congeniality: Florencia Mendez
- Photogenic: Giana Muniz

The Miss Universo Uruguay 2014 was held on January 19, 2014. The winner represented Uruguay at Miss Universe 2014. There were 15 candidates competing for the one title. The pageant was held poolside at the Hotel Punta del Este Arenas.

== Results ==
=== Placements ===
Placement	Contestant
Miss Universo Uruguay 2014	Johana Riva
1st Runner-Up	Romina Fernandez
2nd Runner-Up	Cecilia Ortega
3rd Runner-Up	Serrana Silva
4th Runner-Up	Lorena Rossi

=== Special awards ===
- Best Face - Laura Fernandez
- Best Body - Cecilia Ortega Paredes
- Miss Photogenic - Giana Muniz
- Best Catwalk - Serrana Silva Rivero
- Best Hair: Natalia Pazos Valeri
- Best Legs: Agustina Barreiro
- Miss Poise: Giana Muniz
- Best Skin: Victoria Garcia
- Miss Elegance - Victoria Garcia
- Miss Congeniality - Florencia Mendez
- Natural Beauty - Romina Fernandez

== Delegates ==
#	Contestant	Age	Height	Measures
1	Lorena Rossi	20	1.72	88-63-90
2	Cecilia Ortega Paredes	23	1.73	90-61-91
3	Serrana Silva Rivero	22	1.77	89-60-92
4	Laura Fernandez	19	1.68	83-61-90
5	Natalia Pazos Valeri	20	1.65	85-58-90
6	Leticia Moreira	23	1.70	90-63-92
7	Camila Techera	21	1.70	85-62-83
8	Romina Fernandez	20	1.81	85-70-97
9	Victoria Garcia	22	1.77	88-60-88
10	Estefania Techera	19	1.72	88-62-90
11	Johana Riva	23	1.74	88-63-94
12	Agustina Barreiro	20	1.70	90-60-92
13	Giana Muniz	19	1.79	88-64-92
14	Eugenia Gallego	22	1.70	84-63-94
15	Florencia Mendez	21	1.74	85-63-90

== Official website ==
- Miss Universo Uruguay
