= Lucía Rodríguez =

Lucía Rodríguez may refer to:

- Lucía Rodríguez (athlete)
- Lucía Rodríguez (comedian)
- Lucía Rodríguez (footballer)
