= Laurenz Forer =

Swiss Jesuit theologian (1580–1659)

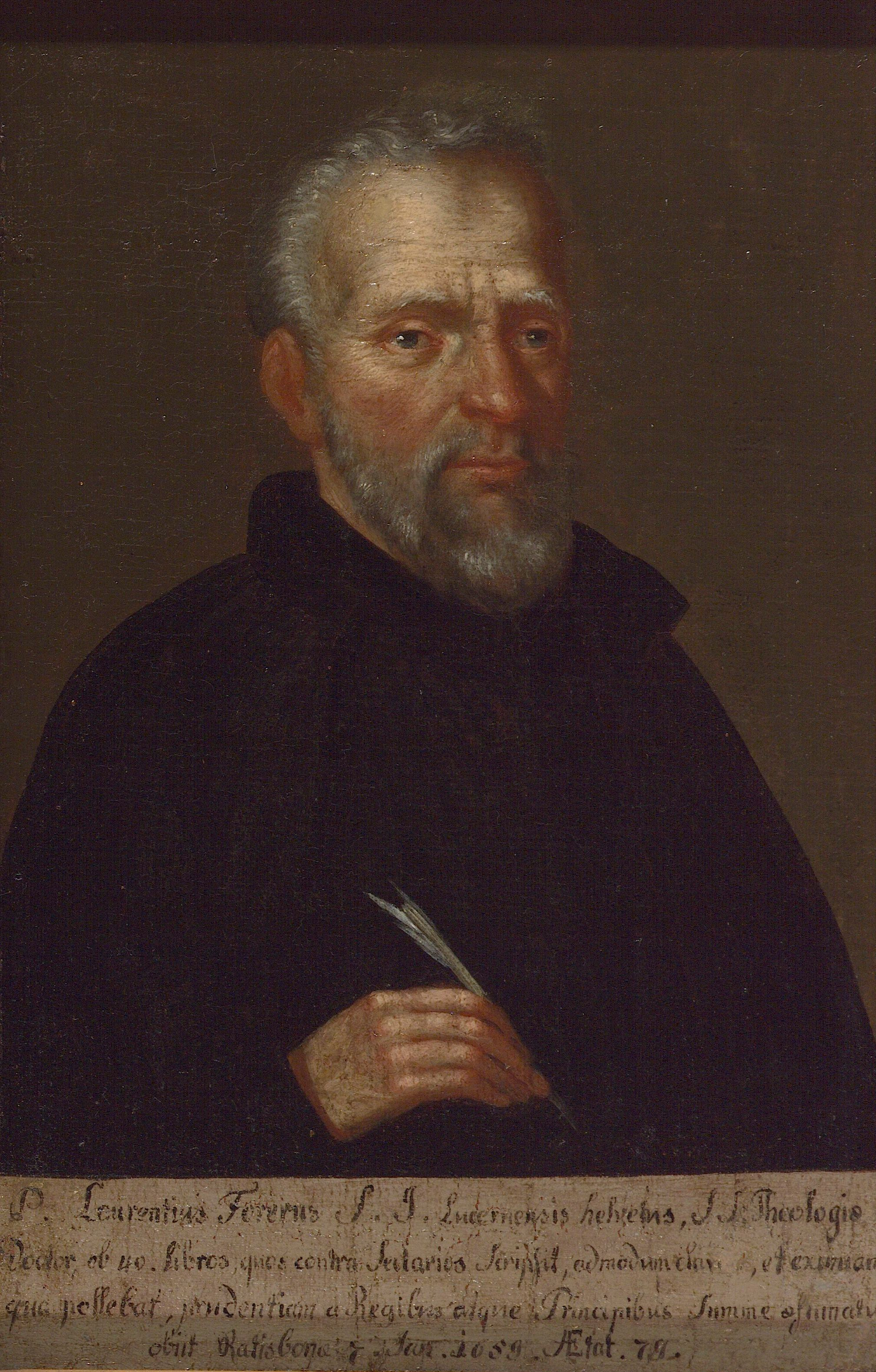
Portrait at the Zentral- und Hochschulbibliothek Luzern

Laurenz Forer (1580 – 7 January 1659) was a Swiss Jesuit theologian and controversialist.

== Life ==
He was born at Lucerne, entered the Society of Jesus at the age of twenty, in Landshut, and made part of his studies under Paul Laymann and Adam Tanner. He taught philosophy at Ingolstadt (1615–1619), and theology, moral and controversial, for six years at Dillingen. In the latter institution he held also the office of chancellor for several years.

He spent the years 1632–1643 in Tyrol, where he had withdrawn with Heinrich von Knöringen, Bishop of Augsburg, on account of the inroads of the Swedes. Forer visited Rome (1645–1646) as the representative of the province of Upper Germany in the eighth congregation. He became rector of the college of Lucerne in 1650. He died at Ratisbon.

== Works ==
Sommervogel enumerates 62 titles of publications from the pen of Forer, not all of them long works.

He wrote one or more treatises each against the apostates Jacob Reihing and de Dominis, and against Melchior Nicolai (1578–1659), Hottinger, Georg Calixtus, Schopp, Molinos, Haberkorn, Voet, Matthias Hoë von Hoënegg, the Ubiquists, and others. Such works as "Lutherus thaumaturgus" (Dillingen, 1624), "Septem characteres Lutheri" (Dillingen, 1626), "Quaestio ubinam ante Lutherum protestantium ecclesia fuerit" (Pt. I, Amberg, 1653; P. II, Ingolstadt, 1654), "Bellum ubiquisticum vetus et novum inter ipsos Lutheranos bellatum et needum debellatum" (Dillingen, 1627) are directed against all Protestants. Others, as "Anatomia anatomiae Societatis Jesu" (Innsbruck, 1634), "Mantissa Ant-anatomiae Jesuiticae" (Innsbruck, 1635; Cologne, 1635), "Grammaticus Proteus, arcanorum Societatis Jesu Daedalus" (Ingolstadt, 1636), "Appendix ad grammaticum Proteum" (Ingolstadt, 1636), attack the enemies of the Society of Jesus.

Two of his works, written for Catholics, "Disputirkunst fur die einfaltigen Catholischen" (Ingolstadt, 1656) and "Leben Jesu Christi" (Dillingen, 1650–1658), were re-edited and republished at Würzburg (1861) and Ratisbon (1856).
