= Veo cómo cantas (Uruguayan game show) =

Uruguayan television game show

- Genre: Game show
- Based on: I Can See Your Voice by CJ ENM
- Written by: Germán Bernárdez
- Directed by: Diego García Scheck
- Creative director: Tavo Carrozzini
- Presented by: Lucía Rodríguez
- Starring: Pampita Ardohaín; Manuela da Silveira; Annasofía Facello; Martín Inthamoussú
- Opening theme: "Good Time" by Owl City and Carly Rae Jepsen
- Country of origin: Uruguay
- Original language: Spanish
- No. of episodes: 10

Production
- Executive producer: Alejandra Borques
- Producers: Hugo Acosta; Marcelo Gonzalez; Gustavo Landivar; Diego Lorenzo; John Melo; Diego Milán
- Camera setup: Multi-camera

Original release
- Network: Teledoce
- Release: 8 April – 10 June 2024

Related
- I Can See Your Voice franchise

Veo cómo cantas (transl. I see how you sing) is a Uruguayan television mystery music game show based on the South Korean program I Can See Your Voice, featuring its format where a guest artist and a contestant attempt to eliminate bad singers from the group, until the last mystery singer remains for a duet performance. It premiered on Teledoce on 8 April 2024.

== Gameplay ==
=== Format ===
Over the course of five rounds, the guest artist and contestant must attempt to eliminate bad singers from a group of seven "mystery singers", identified only by their occupation or alias, without ever hearing them perform live. They are assisted by clues regarding the singers' backgrounds, style of performance, and observations from a celebrity panel. At the end of a game, the last remaining mystery singer is revealed as either good or bad by means of a duet between them and one of the guest artists.

The contestant must eliminate one mystery singer at the end of each round, receiving $U10,000 if they eliminate a bad singer. At the end of a game, if the contestant decides to walk away, they will keep the money had won in previous rounds; if they decide to risk for the last remaining mystery singer, they double their all winnings if a singer is good, or give it anyway to the winning bad singer selected by them.

=== Rounds ===
1. First impression (Spanish: Primera impresión)
  The guest artist and contestant are given some time to observe and examine each mystery singer based on their appearance.
2. Lip sync (Spanish: Sincronización labial)
  Six mystery singers are divided into two groups of trios, and each of them would have to perform lip sync individually.
3. Give me a clue! (Spanish: Dame una pista!)
  The guest artist and contestant are presented with a video package containing possible clues by one of the mystery singers.
4. Musical skill (Spanish: Habilidad musical)
  The guest artist and contestant must describe one of the mystery singer's other talents, except "singing" itself. This may not be related to the "stage of truth", but depends on their identity.
5. Interrogation (Spanish: Interrogatorio)
  The guest artist and contestant may ask questions to the remaining mystery singers. Good singers are required to give truthful responses, while the bad singers must lie.

== Production ==
Following the success of ¿Quién es la máscara?, Grupo Cardoso (the owners of Teledoce) formally acquired the rights to produce an Uruguayan adaptation of I Can See Your Voice as part of CJ ENM's dealing with Fremantle in December 2023, and thus subsequently adapting the Veo cómo cantas title from the Spanish counterpart.

== Episodes ==
=== Guest artists ===
| Legend: |
Good singer
Bad singer
— The contestants won the money.
— The winning bad singer stole the money.

| Episode | | Guest artist (Note: Players' notes: For the returning guest artists (who also include foreigners and former good singers), names are displayed in italics.; For the mixed groups, names who identified as bad singers are displayed in italics.) | Contestant | Mystery singers (In their respective numbers and aliases) | | | | | | |
| # | Date | Guest artist | Contestant | Elimination order | | | | | | Winner |
| # | Date | Guest artist | Contestant | First impression | Lip sync | | Give me a clue! | Musical skill | Interrogation | Winner |
|---|---|---|---|---|---|---|---|---|---|---|
| 1 | 8 April 2024 | Joaquín Levinton (Turf) (Note: Foreign guest artists: Argentina — Joaquín Levinton (Turf) and Axel) | Gabriel Rosadilla → $U60,000 | 3. Carmela Amorim; (Journalist) | 1. Tabaré Hernández; (Programmer) | 6. Federico Rosas; (Comic Collector) | 4. Alfonso Delgado; (Footballer) | 7. Niko White; (Stylist) | 2. Katherine Cipriano; (Croupier) | 5. Devorah Izquierdo; Psychologist |
| 2 | 15 April 2024 | Axel | Fernanda Ibañez → $U80,000 | 1. Javier Mayo Cordero; (Fisherman) | 2. Micaela Rey; (Publicist) | 6. Belén Escobar; (Kickboxer) | 3. Angy Pereira; (Surfer) | 7. Antonella Bava Gibelli; (Physiotherapist) | 5. Leonardo Cruz; (Cartoonist) | 4. Paola Lopez; Lady-doctor |
| 3 | 22 April 2024 | Nati Ferrero | Mauro Sanchez → $U100,000 | 1. Diego Checho Antuña; (Biologist) | 2. Esteban Silva; (Electrician) | 7. Carmen Gómez Castro; (Dubber) | 4. Noe Diaz; (Telemarketer) | 6. Karu Rodriguez; (Nurse) | 5. Fernando Conde; (Pilot) | 3. Facundo Benaprés; Vegetable Vendor |
| 4 | 29 April 2024 | Majo Álvarez | Cinthia Romero → $U0 | 6. Diego Gómez Matto; (Pharmacist) | 2. Belen Martínez; (Court Administrator) | 4. Gabriela Ruiz Mendoza; (Kindergarten Teacher) | 1. Micaela Cáceres; (Industrial Designer) | 5. Valentina Gonatt; (Florist) | 3. Nico Gomez; (Sound Engineer) | 7. Sofía Miraballes; Footballer |
| 5 | 6 May 2024 | Fabián Delgado | Jorge Rodriguez → $U60,000 | 4. Eri Peña; (Law Student) | 1. Mateo de Armas; (Hairdresser) | 7. Connan Madrid; (Winemaker) | 6. Augus Ramponi; (Barber) | 2. Alvaro Godiño; (Mathematician) | 5. Natalia Vega; (Graphic Designer) | 3. Diego Romano; Firefighter |
| 6 | 13 May 2024 | Sole Ramírez | Mayra Martinez → $U60,000 | 1. Noemia Techera; (Pastry Chef) | 3. Silvia Gadea; (Make-up Artist) | 7. Mario Sortiño; (Mariachi Band Member) | 2. Carlos Espondaburu; (Taxi Driver) | 5. Gala Brajús; (Cat Psychologist) | 6. Nadia Suárez; (Cymbalist) | 4. Santi Wirth; Tomato Farmer |
| 7 | 20 May 2024 | Matías Valdez | Jonathan Reynoso → $U80,000 | 7. Florencia López; (Promodizer) | 3. Carolina López; (Model) | 5. Valeria Baladan Liste; (Beekeeper) | 4. Rodrigo Carreño; (Guitar Teacher) | 1. Gabbo Ibarra; (Photographer) | 6. Paola Hernández; (Busker) | 2. Gustavo Torrano; Lumberjack |
| 8 | 27 May 2024 | Agustina Giovio | Nathalia Hagopian → $U40,000 | 4. Viqui Silva; (DJ) | 3. Thian; (Librarian) | 7. Chino Alvarez; (Lifeguard) | 6. Pau Leyton; (English Teacher) | 1. John Fleitas; (Personal Trainer) | 5. Carolina Dobal; (Paleontologist) | 2. Franco Del Priore Barbuti; Video Game Rapporteur |
| 9 | 3 June 2024 | Nacho Obes | Mauricio Juarez → $U0 | 1. Sharon Rodrigues; (Supporting Actress) | 4. Diego Alfaro; (Magician) | 5. Eve Etche; (Reiki Instructor) | 2. Leticia Cocchi; (French Teacher) | 6. Silvina Rojas; (Educational Psychologist) | 3. Ana Laura González; (Yogi) | 7. Florencia Sacco; Swimmer |
| 10 | 10 June 2024 | Chirola Martino (Hereford) | Victoria Izaguirre → $U60,000 | 4. Valentina Estol; (Tango Dancer) | 1. Lucia Stravinsky; (Chinese Restaurant Employee) | 7. Katherine Wohler Luzardo; (Manicurist) | 6. Gustavo Correa; (Construction Worker) | 3. Marcelo Amaral; (Dog Walker) | 2. Cynthia Diaz; (Investigative Policewoman) | 5. Brissa Star; Housewife |

=== Panelists ===
| Legend: |
Regular panelist
Guest panelist

| Apps | | Panelists in attendance (Sorted by first appearance, with episode designations) |
| g# | p# | Panelists in attendance (Sorted by first appearance, with episode designations) |
|---|---|---|
| 10 | 3 | Pampita Ardohaín, (Note: Panelists' note: Foreign attendee: Pampita Ardohaín (ARG)) Manuela da Silveira, and Annasofía Facello (1–10) |
| 9 | 1 | Martín Inthamoussú (1–3, 5–10) |
| 1 | 1 | Nacho Obes (4) |

== Reception ==
Legend:
Highest rated episode
Lowest rated episode

| No. | Title | Air date | Timeslot (UYT) | Rating | | Ref(s) |
| No. | Title | Air date | Timeslot (UYT) | Rank | Points | Ref(s) |
|---|---|---|---|---|---|---|
| 1 | "Joaquín Levinton" | 8 April 2024 | Monday, 21:00 | 2 | 14.5% | |
| 2 | "Axel" | 15 April 2024 | Monday, 21:00 | 2 | 13.4% | |
| 3 | "Nati Ferrero" | 22 April 2024 | Monday, 21:00 | 4 | 11.6% | |
| 4 | "Majo Álvarez" | 29 April 2024 | Monday, 21:00 | Not reported | | |
| 5 | "Fabián Delgado" | 6 May 2024 | Monday, 21:00 | 11 | 8.4% | |
| 6 | "Sole Ramírez" | 13 May 2024 | Monday, 21:00 | 5 | 11% | |
| 7 | "Matías Valdez" | 20 May 2024 | Monday, 21:00 | Not reported | | |
| 8 | "Agustina Giovio" | 27 May 2024 | Monday, 21:00 | Not reported | | |
| 9 | "Nacho Obes" | 3 June 2024 | Monday, 21:00 | 7 | 9.1% | |
| 10 | "Chirola Martino" | 10 June 2024 | Monday, 21:00 | 9 | 10% | |

Source: Kantar IBOPE Media
