= Márama =

- Origin: Uruguay, Montevideo
- Genre: Cumbia pop
- Years active: 2014-2017; 2021-present
- Label: Montevideo Music Group
- Members: Agustín Casanova; Pablo Arnoletti; Agustín Duarte; Matías Besson; Lautaro Moreno; Martín López
- Past members: Alejandro Vázquez; Martín Zina; Danny Muller; Matias Bernaola; Marcos Ifrán
- Website: Official website

Márama (stylized as Marama) is an Uruguayan band formed in 2014 by Fer Vázquez of Rombai. The group is composed of Agustín Casanova, Pablo Arnoletti, Agustín Duarte, Matías Besson, Lautaro Moreno and Martín López. Former members Alejandro Vázquez, Martín Zina, Danny Muller, Matias Bernaola and Marcos Ifrán departed from the group.

In 2015, the band released their first studio album titled Todo Comenzó Bailando, which reached number one in Argentina and Uruguay. It was certified Gold and 2× Platinum in these countries respectively. In June 2016, its biographical documentary film titled Marama & Rombai - El Viaje was released. The band has performed in venues such as the Municipal Velodrome of Montevideo, Gran Rex Theater and Luna Park Stadium, among others.

== History ==
Marama was formed in 2014 in Uruguay, the idea of producer Fer Vázquez, leader of the band Rombai, and Agustín Casanova, singer. The formation is completed by Marcos Ifrán (percussion), Alejandro Vázquez (keyboards), Pablo Arnoletti (percussion) and Martín Zina (guitar). The first singles they released were "Todo Comenzó Bailando" and "Loquita", which reached the top 100 of the most listened to songs in Bolivia that year, according to Monitor Latino. It was followed by the release of the single "No Te Vayas" in August 2014. These songs gave the group an impact and began to sound in Uruguay and Argentina, later expanding their success throughout Latin America. Later, in October, they released "Una Noche Contigo" and in December "Bronceado".

In 2015, in Argentina, the band was among the 10 most listened to on Spotify, after the release of the songs "Nena", "Noche Loca" and "Tal Vez". In November they performed at the Municipal Velodrome of Montevideo, along with Rombai, with sold out tickets. During the same month they made the presentation of their first album, Todo Comenzó Bailando. It was released on the 16th by Montevideo Music Group. In December 2015, together with Rombai, they appeared on television for the first time, on the Argentine program Showmatch, where they performed several of their hits.

In July 2016, they released their biopic with Rombai, titled Marama - Rombai - El Viaje. They also performed at the Teatro Opera in Buenos Aires; the work was titled Márama, La Historia. In November they held concerts at the Montevideo Municipal Velodrome in Uruguay and again at another Luna Park in Argentina. They released six singles: "Volverte A Ver", "Era Tranquila", "Te Amo y Odio", "Lo Intentamos", "Te Conozco", with Rombai, and "Pasarla Bien", and finished the year being the most played artist and album on the Spotify platform in Argentina.

In February 2017, they performed at the closing of the Viña del Mar International Song Festival with Rombai, and won two Gaviota awards. In May they presented a music video on YouTube of a new song, "La Quiero Conocer", in which elements of reggaeton and close to urban rhythms. In June, the group made a special appearance in the Mexican telenovela Mi marido tiene familia, broadcast by Las Estrellas. That same month, the group announced a Spain tour.

At the end of the year, after labor differences, the group dissolved. A year later, Agustín Casanova revealed the reason for the separation, saying: "Márama ended when Fer Vázquez, creator of the group, quarreled with the representative, they decided to dissolve the band and it just coincided with Simona's recordings."

In September 2021, after a distance of four years, rumors began of the return of the cumbia group after the reactivation and publication of a video on the official Twitter account, in which a boy can be seen playing a cassette of the band. Finally, the leader of the band Agustín Casanova, officially announced the return of the band, in the final episode of the second season of Got Talent Uruguay. The return of the group became official on the 28th with the release of the song "Ya No Llora". It reached number 8 on the Billboard Argentina Hot 100 and top five in Uruguay and Chile. In addition, a Latin American tour was also announced, which began with a show at the Antel Arena in Montevideo on December 17. The songs "No Quiero Verte", with Hernán and La Champions Liga, and "Nunca Más" were released in the same year. The last one has the special participation of the soccer player Luis Suárez in its video clip.

"Aunque Te Enamores", a duet with singer Luciano Pereyra, was released on January 14, 2022. The duets "La Culpa", with Nacho, and "Nuestro Amor Regresa", with Migrantes and Nico Valdi were released that same year, along with the songs "Todo A La Vez" and "Resaca". They were also featured on the songs "Me Va Bien Sin Ti" by La K'onga and "Castigo" by Leslie Shaw.

On February 2, 2023, they released the collaboration "Dame Un Besito" together with Argentine singer Rodrigo Tapari. The duet reached number 67 on the Billboard Argentina Hot 100, being their fourth appearance on the chart.

== Discography ==
=== Studio albums ===
List of studio albums, with selected details, chart positions, sales, and certifications
Title	Studio album details	Peak chart positions		Certifications
Title	Studio album details	ARG	URU	Certifications
Todo Comenzó Bailando	Released: November 16, 2015; Label: Montevideo Music Group; Formats: CD, digital download, streaming	1	1	CAPIF: Gold; CUD: 2× Platinum

=== Singles ===
List of singles, with year released, selected chart positions, and album name shown
Title	Year	Peak chart positions				Album
Title	Year	ARG	BOL	CHl	URU	Album
"Todo Comenzó Bailando"	2014	—	—	—	—	Todo Comenzó Bailando
"Loquita"	2014	—	89	—	—	Todo Comenzó Bailando
"No Te Vayas"	2014	—	—	—	—	Todo Comenzó Bailando
"Una Noche Contigo" (with Rombai)	2014	—	—	—	—	Todo Comenzó Bailando
"Bronceado"	2014	—	—	—	—	Todo Comenzó Bailando
"Nena"	2015	—	—	9	—	Todo Comenzó Bailando
"Noche Loca" (with Rombai)	2015	—	—	77	—	Todo Comenzó Bailando
"Tal Vez"	2015	—	—	—	—	Todo Comenzó Bailando
"Volverte A Ver"	2016	—	—	—	—	Todo Comenzó Bailando
"Era Tranquila"	2016	—	—	—	—	Non-album single
"Te Amo y Odio"	2016	—	—	—	—	Todo Comenzó Bailando
"Lo Intentamos"	2016	—	—	—	15	Non-album single
"Te Conozco" (with Rombai)	2016	—	—	—	—	Todo Comenzó Bailando
"Pasarla Bien"	2016	—	—	—	—	Non-album singles
"La Quiero Conocer"	2017	—	—	—	3	Non-album singles
"Vive y Disfruta"	2017	—	—	—	—	Non-album singles
"Que Rico Baila" (with Rombai)	2017	—	—	—	—	Non-album singles
"Ya No Llora"	2021	8	—	4	3	Non-album singles
"No Quiero Verte" (with Hernán y La Champions Liga)	2021	—	—	—	—	Non-album singles
"Nunca Más"	2021	—	—	3	—	Non-album singles
"Aunque Te Enamores" (with Luciano Pereyra)	2022	41	—	—	4	Non-album singles
"Todo A La Vez"	2022	—	—	—	—	Non-album singles
"Resaca"	2022	—	—	—	—	Non-album singles
"La Culpa" (with Nacho)	2022	91	—	—	—	Non-album singles
"Nuestro Amor Regresa" (with Migrantes and Nico Valdi)	2022	—	—	—	—	Non-album singles
"Dame Un Besito" (with Rodrigo Tapari)	2023	67	—	—	—	Non-album singles

==== As featured artist ====
List of singles, with year released, selected chart positions, and album name shown
Title	Year	Album
"Me Va Bien Sin Ti" (La K'onga with Márama)	2022	Non-album singles
"Castigo" (Leslie Shaw with Márama)	2022	Non-album singles

== Members ==
- Agustín Casanova (Vocalist)
- Pablo Arnoletti (Percussionist)
- Marcos Ifran (Percussionist)
- Agustín Duarte (Drummer)
- Lautaro Moreno (Keyboard player)
- Alejandro Vázquez (Keyboard player)
- Matías Besson (Bass player)
- Martín López (Guitarist)

== Accolades ==
On February 26, 2017, they performed together with Rombai at the Quinta Vergara Amphitheater, participating for the first time in the Viña del Mar International Song Festival in Chile, where they obtained a Silver Gull and a Golden Gull.

That year, their album Todo comenzó bailando was nominated for the Premios Gardel in the Best Tropical Group Album category. They received four Graffiti Awards nominations for the categories Best New Artist, Best Tropical Album, Song of the Year, and Best Latin Pop Album, winning the latter.
