= Fatimih Dávila =

Uruguayan model (1988–2019)

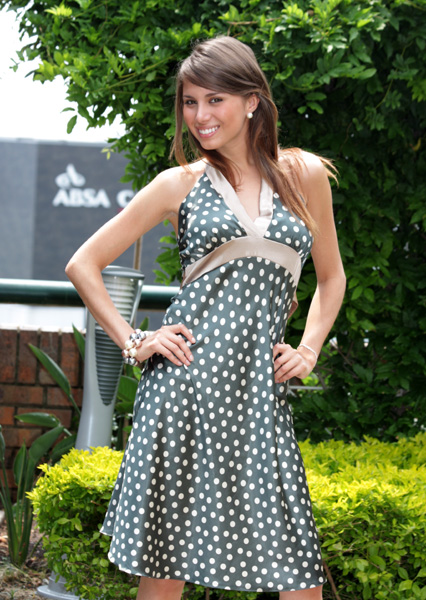
- Dávila in 2008
- Born: Fatimih Dávila Sosa; 1 February 1988; Punta del Este, Uruguay
- Died: 2 May 2019 (aged 31); Mexico City, Mexico
- Height: 1.76 m (5 ft 9 in)
- Beauty pageant titleholder
- Title: Miss Universo Uruguay 2006; Miss Mundo Uruguay 2008
- Major competitions: Miss Universe 2006; Miss World 2008

Fatimih Dávila Sosa (1 February 1988 – 2 May 2019) was a Uruguayan model and beauty pageant titleholder who was the winner of Miss Universo Uruguay 2006, where she represented Punta del Este. Since she won the national pageant, she travelled to Los Angeles, USA to represent Uruguay in the 2006 Miss Universe pageant, which was held on 23 July 2006.

== Life ==
=== Model career ===
She also represented her country in Reina Sudamericana 2006 (finalist), Miss Model of the World 2006 (semifinalist), Miss Continente Americano 2006 (First-runner up) and Miss World 2008 in Johannesburg, South Africa, on 13 December 2008.

=== TV career ===
Dávila had also a supporting role in the Mexican Telenovelas El triunfo del amor on El Universal and Soy tu dueña on Televisa.

=== Personal life ===
She lived in Las Condes from 2006 to 2011, and Santiago de Chile and later in Ciudad De Mexico.

=== Death ===
On 2 May 2019, Dávila was found dead at a hotel in Colonia Nápoles, Mexico City.

Preceded by -	Miss Continente Americano Uruguay; 2006	Succeeded by Agostina Padula
