= Porque te quiero así =

- Genre: Telenovela
- Written by: Adriana Lorenzón
- Directed by: Eduardo Ripari
- Starring: Jorge Echagüe; Florencia Peña; Jorge Esmoris; Catherine Fulop
- Country of origin: Uruguay
- Original language: Spanish
- No. of seasons: 2
- No. of episodes: 57

Production
- Production location: Montevideo, Uruguay
- Running time: 60 minutes
- Production company: Canal 10

Original release
- Network: Canal 10
- Release: July 20, 2010 – November 1, 2011

Porque te quiero así (Spanish: Because I Love You That Way) is a Uruguayan telenovela produced and aired on Channel 10 from 2010 to 2011. Starring Jorge Echagüe and Florencia Peña in the first season, and Echagüe alongside Catherine Fulop in the second, the series follows a group of people whose lives intertwine around a neighborhood sports club, witnessing Susana’s return to the country after many years and her reunion with a former love.

== Plot summary ==
Susana Macedo (Florencia Peña) has lived in Spain for 3 years and decides to return to Montevideo just to sign the divorce papers with her ex-husband Washington Sosa (Jorge Esmoris). There she will meet Lito González (Jorge Echagüe), with whom she had a romantic history in the past and will try not to meet him, to quickly return to Europe. However, everything changes when Omar Macedo (Adhemar Rubbo), Susana's father and president of the Olympic Sports Club, suffers a health problem and is forced to abandon the position. At the request of her father, Susana must participate in elections, in which Lito and Washington also participate. A dispute will begin between the three candidates, which will lead to debates, provocations, alliances and betrayals. Finally they will be forced to choose between love for the shirt or for the other.

== Cast ==
- Florencia Peña as Susana Macedo (Season 1)
- Jorge Echagüe as Miguel "Lito" González
- Jorge Esmoris as Washington Sosa
- Rubén Rada as Nelson (Season 1)
- Catherine Fulop as Alejandra Guzmán (Season 2)
- Gustaf van Perinostein as Silvio
- Cristina Morán as Chela
- Humberto de Vargas as Rubens Robaina
- Noelia Campo as Carolina Macedo
- Virginia Ramos as Pochi
- Florencia Zabaleta as Rosario González
- Martín Cardozo as Juanjo González
- Adhemar Rubbo as Omar Macedo
- Mauricio Jortak as Santiago (Season 1)
- Diego Delgrossi as Julio
- Graciela Rodriguez as Francesca Schiaretti (Season 2)
- Nicolás Furtado as Ciro Schiaretti/Ciro González Guzmán (Season 2)
- Ariel Caldarelli as Giovanni Schiaretti (Season 2)
- Rafael Beltrán as Pablo (Season 2)
- Lucía David de Lima as Isabel (Season 2)
- Ernesto Liotti as Ángelo (Season 2)
- Gaspar Valverde as Darío (Season 2)

== Production ==
The first season premiered on July 20, 2010, and ended on November 2, 2010 with 16 chapters aired.

It was scripted by the Argentine Adriana Lorenzón, author of Montecristo, Los Roldán and El Capo, directed by Eduardo Ripari (Los Exitosos Pells, Montecristo, Los Roldán, Criminal) and produced in HD, the fiction has a casting of excellence led by the well-known Argentine actress Florencia Peña (La Niñera and Casados con Hijos) and important local figures, such as Coco Echagüe, Jorge Esmoris and Rubén Rada.

After the success of the series, it was renewed for a second season, which starred Catherine Fulop, and was broadcast between July 26, 2011 and November 1, 2011. It had 40 episodes and a Special Program.

== Awards and nominations ==
Year	Award	Category	Recipient(s)	Result	Ref.
2011	Iris Award	Best Television Fiction	Porque te quiero así	Won	
2011	Iris Award	Best Actor/Actress of Television Fiction	Florencia Peña	Won	
2011	Iris Award	Best Actor/Actress of Television Fiction	Jorge Esmoris	Nominated	
2012	Iris Award	Best Fiction	Porque te quiero así	Nominated	
