= 2017 Viña del Mar International Song Festival =

- Title card
- Spanish: Festival Internacional de la Canción de Viña del Mar 2017
- Genre: Music
- Directed by: Alex Hernandez
- Presented by: Rafael Araneda; Carolina de Moras
- Judges: Maluma; Lali Espósito; Mon Laferte; Power Peralta; Mario Domm; Río Roma; Gastón Bernardou; Mariela Encarnación; Marcela Pino; Carolina Varleta
- Country of origin: Chile
- Original language: Spanish

Production
- Production locations: Quinta Vergara Amphitheater, Viña del Mar
- Running time: 300-360 minutes
- Production company: Turner Broadcasting System Latin America

Original release
- Network: Chilevisión; TNT Latin America; HTV
- Release: February 20 – February 25, 2017

The LVIII Edition of the Viña del Mar International Song Festival (Spanish: LVIII Festival Internacional de la Canción de Viña del Mar 2017), also known as Viña 2017, took place from February 20 to 25, 2017 at Quinta Vergara Amphitheater, in the Chilean city of Viña del Mar.

== Development ==
	Opening
	Performing Artist
	Humorist
	Folk Competition
	International Competition
G / G	Gaviota de plata / oro
UTC -3	Chile Time

=== Day 1 - Monday 20 ===
N°	Name	Description	Show time	Awards	Setlist / routine
O	Tribute to Violeta Parra: Consuelo Schuster, Camila Gallardo, Claudia Acuña, Paz Binimelis, Isabel Parra and Tita Parra	Festival opening	22:06 — 22:14	—	List: 1. "Volver a los 17"; 2. "El gavilán"; 3. "Arriba quemando el sol"; 4. "Rin del angelito"; 5. "Run Run se fue pa'l norte"; 6. "El albertío"; 7. "Lo que más quiero"; 8. "Gracias a la vida"; 9. "El día de tu cumpleaños"
1	(Argentina) Los Fabulosos Cadillacs	Argentine ska band	22:300 — 00:04	G (23:45); G (23:55)	List: 1. "Manuel Santillán, el león"; 2. "Mi mujer se cayó a un pozo ciego"; 3. "La luz del ritmo"; 4. "El aguijón"; 5. "El genio del dub"; 6. "Demasiada presión"; 7. "Averno, el fantasma"; 8. "La tormenta"; 9. "No era para vos"; 10. "Calaveras y diablitos"; 11. "Saco azul"; 12. "Revolution Rock" (The Clash cover); 13. "Carnaval toda la vida"; 14. "Carmela"; 15. "Mal bicho"; 16. "Matador"; 17. "Siguiendo la luna"; 18. "Vasos vacíos"; 19. "El satánico Dr. Cadillac"; 20. "Yo no me sentaría a tu mesa"
2	(Chile) Juan Pablo López	Stand up humorist	00:260 — 01:35	G (01:24); G (01:32)	List: Problemas de los chilenos; Situaciones de su vida y de la vida cotidiana; Situaciones de los jefes; Situaciones de parejas; Situaciones de supermercado; Servicio Militar; Crítica Social; Problemas habitacionales; Situaciones del Metro de Santiago
3	(Chile) Daniel Parraguéz	International Competition	—	5,1^{P}	"Solo por Esta Noche"
4	(Cuba) Danay Suárez	International Competition	—	6,1^{P}	"Yo Aprendí"
5	(Mexico) Jass Reyes	International Competition	—	5,5^{P}	"Cielo en Llamas"
6	(Colombia) Puerto Sabana	Folk Competition	—	4,7^{P}	"Elisa, la alegre"
7	(Argentina) Ceci Méndez	Folk Competition	—	3,8^{P}	"Un certain flaneur"
8	(Venezuela) Lydia Arosemena	Folk Competition	—	5,0^{P}	"El platanal"
9	(Argentina) Los Auténticos Decadentes	Argentine de ska, alternative rock and fusion band	02:52 — 03:57	G (03:44); G (03:54)	List: 1. "Cómo me voy a olvidar"; 2. "Pendeviejo"; 3. "Enciendan los parlantes"; 4. "Los piratas"; 5. "Corazón"; 6. "Diosa"; 7. "Besándote"; 8. "El gran señor"; 9. "Vení Raquel"; 10. "Entregá el marrón"; 11. "El murguero"; 12. "Un osito de peluche de Taiwán"; 13. "No me importa el dinero"; 14. "Somos"; 15. "La guitarra"; 16. "Loco (tu forma de ser)"; 17. "Y la banda sigue"; 18. "Siga el baile"

=== Day 2 - Tuesday 21 ===
- (Argentina) (Mexico) Camila
- (Mexico) Sin Bandera
- (Chile) Daniela "Chiqui" Aguayo

=== Day 3 - Wednesday 22 ===
- (Spain) Isabel Pantoja
- (Mexico) Río Roma
- (Colombia) Carlos "El Mono" Sánchez

=== Day 4 - Thursday 23 ===
- (United Kingdom) (Australia) Olivia Newton-John
- (Chile) Juan Luis "Jaja" Calderón
- (United States) Peter Cetera

=== Day 5 - Friday 24 ===
- (Colombia) Maluma
- (Chile) Américo
- (Chile) Rodrigo Villegas

=== Day 6 - Saturday 25 ===
- (Colombia) J Balvin
- (Argentina) Lali Espósito
- (Chile) Mon Laferte
- (Chile) Fabrizio Copano
- (Uruguay) Márama
- (Uruguay) Rombai

== Jury ==
- (Colombia) Maluma
- (Argentina) Lali Espósito
- (Chile) Mon Laferte
- (Chile) Power Peralta
- (Mexico) Mario Domm, from Camila
- (Mexico) Río Roma
- (Argentina) Gastón Bernardou, from Los Auténticos Decadentes
- (Dominican Republic) Mariela Encarnación
- (Chile) Marcela Pino (Jury of the people)
- (Chile) Carolina Varleta

== Queen of the Festival ==
The Chilean model and panelist of the morning programme of Canal 13 "Bienvenidos" Kika Silva was elected Queen of the Festival of Viña del Mar with 143 votes of the journalists.
