= Camila Vezzoso =

Uruguayan model and beauty pageant titleholder

- Born: Camila Vezzoso García; 29 October 1993 (age 32); Artigas, Uruguay
- Height: 1.74 m (5 ft 8 1/2 in)
- Beauty pageant titleholder
- Title: Miss Uruguay 2012
- Hair color: Dark Brown
- Eye color: Dark brown
- Major competitions: Elite Model Look Uruguay 2010 (2nd Runner Up); Miss Artigas 2012 (Winner); Miss Uruguay 2012 (Winner); Miss Universe 2012; Miss United Continent 2013 (3rd Runner Up)

Camila Vezzoso is a model from Uruguay and beauty pageant titleholder who was crowned Miss Uruguay 2012. She also represented Uruguay in the 2012 Miss Universe pageant in Las vegas Following the contests, she moved to Paris and is currently pursuing a modeling career.

== Contests ==
=== Elite Model Look 2010 ===
Camilla was a second runner-up at Elite Model Look 2010 in Uruguay.

=== Miss Uruguay 2012 ===
Camila Vezzoso was crowned Miss Universo Uruguay 2012 in Montevideo, Uruguay, on Thursday, 31 May 2012.

=== Miss Universe 2012 ===
She went to Colombia and Venezuela for preparation in makeup, public speaking, and runway, representing Uruguay at Miss Universe 2012 held in December that year.

=== Miss United Continent 2013 ===
On 14 September 2013, Vezzoso participated in the Miss United Continent 2013 pageant in Guayaquil, Ecuador. She placed 3rd.

Awards and achievements
Preceded by Fernanda Semino	Miss Universo Uruguay; 2012	Succeeded by Micaela Orsi
Preceded by Valentina Henderson	Miss United Continent Uruguay; 2013	Incumbent
