= Bianca Sánchez =

Uruguayan model and beauty pageant titleholder

- Born: Bianca Sánchez; August 6, 1996 (age 30); Montevideo, Uruguay
- Height: 1.79 m (5 ft 10 in)
- Beauty pageant titleholder
- Title: Miss Uruguay 2015
- Hair color: Black
- Eye color: Hazel
- Major competitions: Miss Uruguay 2015 (Winner); Miss Universe 2015 (Unplaced)

Bianca Sánchez (born on August 6, 1996) is a Uruguayan model and beauty pageant titleholder who was crowned Miss Uruguay 2015 and represented her country at the Miss Universe 2015 pageant.

== Personal life ==
Bianca lives in Montevideo and works as a model.

=== Miss Uruguay 2015 ===
On April 26, 2015 Bianca was crowned Miss Uruguay 2015 at Hotel Sofitel Montevideo. Fifteen contestants from across Uruguay competed for the crown. Sánchez was crowned by Miss Uruguay 2014, Johana Riva, while the 1st runner-up, or Miss World Uruguay 2015, Sherika De Armas was crowned by Romina Fernández, First Runner-up 2014. The pageant was broadcast live on VTV Uruguay.

=== Miss Universe 2015 ===
As Miss Uruguay 2015, Bianca competed at the Miss Universe 2015 pageant but Unplaced.

Awards and achievements
Preceded by Johana Riva	Miss Uruguay; 2015	Succeeded by Magdalena Cohendet
