= Haberkorn =

Haberkorn is a German surname. Notable people with the surname include:

- Charles Haberkorn (1880–1966), American tug of war competitor and wrestler
- Federico Haberkorn (born 1994), Argentine footballer
- Leonardo Haberkorn (born 1963), Uruguayan journalist and writer
- Todd Haberkorn (born 1982), American actor, voice actor
