= Miss Uruguay =

Beauty pageant

Miss Uruguay Organization
- Formation: 1952; 74 years ago
- Type: Beauty pageant
- Headquarters: Montevideo
- Location: Uruguay
- Members: Miss Universe
- Official language: Spanish
- Organization: CNB Uruguay
- Key people: Yeison Coronado

The Miss Uruguay is a national beauty pageant in Uruguay that selects Uruguay representatives to compete in three of the big four major international beauty pageants: the Miss World, Miss Universe and Miss Earth competitions.

== History ==
Began in 1952 the committee of Miss Uruguay held Miss Uruguay for Miss Universe the first time. Between 1965 and 1979 the pageant was broadcast on TV under Miguel Angel Viera Bruchou. The Miss Uruguay constantly sends its winner to the Miss Universe and runner-up to Miss World. In addition, Miss Uruguay winners may compete to Miss International, Reina Hispanoamericana, Miss Intercontinental, Miss United Continents, Reina Internacional del Café and Miss America Latina.

=== Franchise holders ===
In 2000 due to financial support, Miss Uruguay lost the Miss International franchise. Started in that year, Miss Uruguay selects its winner to only Miss Universe and first runner-up to Miss World.

In 2004 after Mieguel Angel Viera Bruchou directed the Miss Uruguay contest, the Promociones Gloria took over to hold Miss Universo Uruguay pageant where the main winner automatically went to Miss Universe and runner-up participated to Miss World. The Gloria pageant had existed until 2006. In 2006 Antonio Vergara Olmos purchased Miss Universe franchise to Uruguay. The pageant was broadcast on Teledoce (2006–2007) and TV Ciudad (2008–2010). Between 2011 and 2015 the Miss Uruguay held at Conrad Hotel in Punta del Este.

Osmel Sousa, former Miss Venezuela President, took over the Miss Universe license in Uruguay in 2019, and picked a delegate to attend the international pageant.

In 2020, Nadia Cerri, director of the Miss World license in Argentina, took over the Miss World and Miss Universe licenses in Uruguay, and is proceeding to organize separate competitions of Miss Mundo Uruguay and Miss Universo Uruguay.

== Titleholders ==
The first Miss Uruguay 1952 was Nennella Prunell who withdrew at the Miss Universe 1952 in Long Beach after getting crown of Miss Uruguay. For personal reasons, Prunell decided to not compete at the Miss Universe first edition. Her first runner-up, Gladys Rubio Fajardo took over her chance to be the first Miss Universe representative from Uruguay. Began in 2004 the Miss Uruguay Organization renamed as Miss Universo Uruguay and divided the title into the two categories where the main Miss Uruguay named as Miss Universo Uruguay and the second title will be automatically awarded as Miss Mundo Uruguay. TNT Latinoamérica has become an official broadcast network for Uruguay.

Year	Miss Uruguay	Department	Notes
1952	Nennella Prunell	Montevideo	Country Club Atlantis (Canelones) directorship
1953	Ada Alicia Ibáñez Amengual	Montevideo	
1954	Ana Moreno	Montevideo	
1955	Inge Hoffmann	Montevideo	
1956	Gullermina Aguirre	Montevideo	
1957	Gabriela Pascal	Montevideo	
1958	Irene Augustyniak	Montevideo	
1959	Claudia Bernat	Montevideo	
1960	Iris Teresa Ubal Cabrera	Montevideo	
1961	Susanna Lausorog Ferrari	Montevideo	
1962	Nelly Pettersen Vasigaluz	Montevideo	
1963	Graciela Pintos	Montevideo	
1964	Delia Babiak	Montevideo	
1965	Sonia Raquel Gorbaran	Montevideo	Mieguel Angel Viera and Canal 12 directorship
1966	Susana Regeden	Montevideo	
1967	Mayela Berton Martínez	Montevideo	
1968	Graciela Minarrieta	Montevideo	
1969	Julia Möller Roche	Montevideo	
1970	Reneé Buncristiano	Montevideo	
1971	Alba Techeira López	Montevideo	
1972	Cristina Moller	Montevideo	
1973	Yolanda Ferrari	Montevideo	
1974	Mirta Graziella Rodríguez	Montevideo	
1975	Evelyn Rodríguez	Montevideo	
1976	Sara Alaga Valega	Montevideo	
1977	Adriana Umpierre Escudero	Salto	
1978	María del Carmen da Rosa	Salto	
1979	Elizabeth Busti	Montevideo	
1980	Beatriz Antúñez	Montevideo	Mieguel Angel Viera directorship
1981	Griselda Dianne Anchorena	Montevideo	
1982	Silvia Beatriz Vila Abavian	Montevideo	
1983	María Jacqueline Beltrán	Montevideo	
1984	Giselle Barthou Quintes	Montevideo	
1985	Andrea Beatríz López Silva	Montevideo	
1986	Norma Silvana García Lapitz	Montevideo	
1987	María Victoria Zangaro Groso	Montevideo	
1988	Carla Trombotti	Montevideo	Reina Mundial del Banana 1987
1989	Carolina Pies Riet	Montevideo	
1990	Ondina Pérez Isaza	Montevideo	
1991	Adriana Comas Silvera	Cerro Largo	
1992	Gabriela Ventura Escoba	Montevideo	
1993	María Fernanda Navarro Guigou	Montevideo	
1994	Leonora Îrene Dibueno Fenocchi	Montevideo	
1995	Sandra Znidaric	Montevideo	
1996	Adriana Sandra Maidana	Maldonado	
1997	Ana González	Montevideo	
1998	Virginia Lourdes Russo Marrero	Montevideo	
1999	Verónica González	Montevideo	
2000	Natalia Figueras Cabezas	Montevideo	Dethroned
2001	Carla Leticia Piaggio Taracido	Montevideo	
2002	Fiorella Fleitas	Canelones	
2003	Natalia Rodríguez Lassiy	Montevideo	
2004	Nadia Theoduloz	Maldonado	Dethroned
2005	Viviana Antonella Arenas	Salto	
2006	Fatimih Dávila Sosa	Maldonado	Antonio Vergara Olmos (Teledoce Televisión Color) directorship
2007	Giannina Carla Silva Varela	Artigas	Miss America Latina 2007
2008	Paula Andrea Díaz Galione	Canelones	
2009	Cinthia Carolina D'Ottone Reyna	Colonia	
2010	Stephany Ortega Da Costa	Montevideo	
2011	María Fernanda Semino	Montevideo	
2012	Camila Vezzoso García	Artigas	
2013	Micaela Orsi Jorcín	Colonia	
2014	Johana Riva Garabetian	Montevideo	
2015	Bianca Sánchez Pico	Montevideo	
2016	Magdalena Cohendet	Artigas	Miss América Continental 2019 — In 2016 the Miss Uruguay was taken over by Laurens Drillich, Leti Fernandez Feijoo (Escuela de Modelos y Actitud-EMA Model Uruguay) and TNT Latin America
2017	Marisol Acosta	Canelones	
2018	Sofía Marrero	Canelones	
2019	Fiona Tenuta Vanerio	Maldonado	Osmel Sousa directorship
2020	Lola de los Santos	Paysandú	Nadia Cerri directorship
2022	Carla Romero	Montevideo	
2024	Yanina Lucas	Lavalleja	Yeison Coronado directorship
2025	Valeria Baladan Liste	Montevideo	
2026	Lucía Piñeyro Lima	Paysandú	

== Titleholders under Miss Uruguay org. ==
=== Miss Universo Uruguay ===
- : Declared as Winner
- : Ended as runner-up or top 5/6 qualification
- : Ended as one of the finalists or semifinalists
- : Ended as special awards winner

Miss Uruguay has been sending representatives in three of the Big Four international beauty pageants. Traditionally, the winner of Miss Uruguay represents her country at the Miss Universe pageant. On occasion, when the winner does not qualify (due to age) for contest, a runner-up is sent.

Year	Department	Miss Uruguay	Placement at Miss Universe	Special Awards	Notes
2026	Paysandú	Lucía Piñeyro			
2025	Montevideo	Valeria Baladan	Unplaced		
2024	Lavalleja	Yanina Lucas	Unplaced		Yeison Coronado directorship
2023	Did not compete				
2022	Montevideo	Carla Romero	Unplaced		
2021	Did not compete				
2020	Paysandú	Lola de los Santos	Unplaced		Nadia Cerri directorship.
2019	Maldonado	Fiona Tenuta Vanerio	Unplaced		Osmel Sousa directorship.
2018	Canelones	Sofía Marrero	Unplaced		
2017	Canelones	Marisol Acosta	Unplaced		
2016	Artigas	Magdalena Cohendet	Unplaced		Laurens Drillich, Leti Fernandez Feijoo (Escuela de Modelos y Actitud-EMA Model Uruguay) and TNT Latin America directorship.
2015	Montevideo	Bianca Sánchez Pico	Unplaced		
2014	Montevideo	Johana Riva Garabetian	Unplaced		
2013	Colonia	Micaela Orsi Jorcín	Did not compete		Withdrew — Due to lack of support, Miss Uruguay 2013, Micaela Orsi withdrew at the Miss Universe 2013 in Moscow. Orsi came to Miss Universe Office in New York to declare her withdrawal in the 62nd edition of the pageant.
2012	Artigas	Camila Vezzoso García	Unplaced		
2011	Montevideo	Maria Fernanda Semino	Unplaced		
2010	Montevideo	Stephany Ortega Da Costa	Unplaced		
2009	Colonia	Cinthia Carolina D'Ottone Reyna	Unplaced		
2008	Canelones	Paula Andrea Díaz Galione	Unplaced		
2007	Artigas	Giannina Carla Silva Varela	Unplaced		
2006	Maldonado	Fatimih Dávila Sosa	Unplaced	Best National Costume (Top 20)	Antonio Vergara Olmos (Teledoce Televisión Color) directorship.
2005	Salto	Viviana Antonella Arenas	Unplaced		
2004	Maldonado	Nicole Dupont Giglo	Unplaced	Best National Costume (Top 10)	Nadia Theoduloz dethroned as "Miss Uruguay 2004", Nicole replaced her as an official representative to Miss Universe 2004 in Ecuador — The Promociones Gloria collaborated with Miss Uruguay Organization.
2003	Did not compete				
2002	Canelones	Fiorella Fleitas	Unplaced		
2001	Montevideo	Carla Leticia Piaggio Taracido	Unplaced		
2000	Montevideo	Giovanna Piazza Diaz	Unplaced		Natalia Figueras Cabezas dethroned as "Miss Uruguay 2000" and automatically withdrew at Miss Universe, Giovanna replaced her to compete at Miss Universe 2000 in Cyprus.
1999	Montevideo	Verónica González	Unplaced		
1998	Montevideo	Virginia Lourdes Russo Marrero	Unplaced		
1997	Montevideo	Adriana Cano Garcia	Unplaced		
1996	Maldonado	Adriana Sandra Maidana	Unplaced		
1995	Montevideo	Sandra Znidaric	Unplaced		
1994	Montevideo	Leonora Îrene Dibueno Fenocchi	Unplaced		
1993	Montevideo	Maria Fernanda Navarro Guigou	Unplaced		
1992	Montevideo	Gabriela Ventura Escoba	Unplaced		
1991	Cerro Largo	Adriana Comas Silvera	Unplaced		
1990	Montevideo	Ondina Pérez Isaza	Unplaced		
1989	Montevideo	Carolina Pies Riet	Unplaced		
1988	Montevideo	Carla Trombotti	Unplaced		
1987	Montevideo	María Victoria Zangaro Groso	Unplaced		
1986	Montevideo	Norma Silvana García Lapitz	Unplaced		
1985	Montevideo	Andrea Beatríz López Silva	4th Runner-up		
1984	Montevideo	Yissa Pronzatti Perez	Unplaced	Best National Costume (1st Runner-up)	
1983	Montevideo	María Jacqueline Beltrán	Unplaced		
1982	Montevideo	Silvia Beatriz Vila Abavian	Top 12	Best National Costume (2nd Runner-up)	
1981	Montevideo	Griselda Dianne Anchorena	Unplaced		
1980	Montevideo	Beatriz Antuñez	Unplaced		Mieguel Angel Viera Directorship
1979	Montevideo	Elizabeth Busti	Unplaced	Best National Costume	
1978	Salto	Maria del Carmen da Rosa	Unplaced		
1977	Salto	Adriana Umpierre Escudero	Unplaced	Best National Costume (1st Runner-up)	
1976	Montevideo	Sara Alaga Valega	Unplaced		
1975	Montevideo	Evelyn Rodríguez	Unplaced		
1974	Montevideo	Mirta Graziella Rodríguez	Unplaced		
1973	Montevideo	Yolanda Ferrari	Unplaced		
1972	Montevideo	Cristina Moller	Unplaced		
1971	Montevideo	Alba Techeira López	Unplaced		
1970	Montevideo	Reneé Buncristiano	Unplaced		
1969	Montevideo	Julia Möller Roche	Unplaced		
1968	Montevideo	Graciela Minarrieta	Unplaced		
1967	Montevideo	Mayela Berton Martinez	Unplaced		
1966	Montevideo	Susana Regeden	Did not compete		
1965	Montevideo	Sonia Raquel Gorbaran	Unplaced		Mieguel Angel Viera and Canal 12 directorship.
1964	Montevideo	Delia Babiak	Unplaced		
1963	Montevideo	Graciela Pintos	Unplaced		
1962	Montevideo	Nelly Pettersen Vasigaluz	Unplaced		
1961	Montevideo	Susanna Lausorog Ferrari	Unplaced		
1960	Montevideo	Iris Teresa Ubal Cabrera	Unplaced		
1959	Montevideo	Claudia Bernat	Unplaced		
1958	Montevideo	Irene Augustyniak	Unplaced		
1957	Montevideo	Gabriela Pascal	Top 16	Miss Photogenic (4th Runner-up)	
1956	Montevideo	Titina Aguirre	Unplaced		
1955	Montevideo	Inge Hoffmann	Unplaced		
1954	Montevideo	Ana Moreno	Top 16		
1953	Montevideo	Ada Alicia Ibáñez Amengual	Top 16		
1952	Montevideo	Gladys Rubio Fajardo	Top 10		Country Club Atlantis (Canelones) directorship.

=== Miss Mundo Uruguay ===
- : Declared as Winner
- : Ended as runner-up or top 5/6 qualification
- : Ended as one of the finalists or semifinalists
- : Ended as special awards winner

The 1st Runner-up usually represented her country at Miss World. From 2016 to 2017 after Miss Universo Uruguay brand had bought to TNT, the former director Antonio Vergara Olmos (Teledoce Televisión Color) organized the Nuestra Belleza Uruguaya competition.

Year	Department	Miss Mundo Uruguay	Placement at Miss World	Special Awards	Notes
2023	Montevideo	Tatiana Luna	Unplaced		
2022	Miss World 2021 was rescheduled to 16 March 2022 due to the COVID-19 pandemic outbreak in Puerto Rico, no edition started in 2022				
2021	Montevideo	Valentina Camejo	Unplaced	Miss World Talent (Top 27)	Nadia Cerri directorship.
Did not compete between 2018—2020
2017	Montevideo	Melina Carballo Fagúndez	Unplaced		
2016	Montevideo	María Romina Trotto Morales	Unplaced	Miss World Sport (Top 24)	Antonio Vergara Olmos (Teledoce Televisión Color) directorship.
Uruguayan Representatives from Miss Uruguay
2015	Montevideo	Sherika de Armas Elías	Unplaced		
2014	Montevideo	Romina Fernández Sellanes	Unplaced		
2013	Montevideo	Mercedes Bissio Del Puerto	Did not compete		Withdrawal — Due to internal reasons from the organization — Top 3 of Miss Uruguay 2013 withdrew at International pageants.
2012	Montevideo	Valentina Henderson Aromburu	Unplaced		
2011	Montevideo	Karina Belén Sogliano Maldonado	Unplaced		
2010	Montevideo	Eliana Sabrina Olivera Gonnet	Unplaced		
2009	Montevideo	Claudia Rossina Vanrell Escalante	Unplaced		
2008	Maldonado	Fatimih Dávila Sosa	Unplaced		
2007	Did not compete				
2006	Montevideo	Soledad Gagliardo	Unplaced		
2005	Montevideo	Daniela Tambasco Marfetan	Unplaced		
2004	Montevideo	María Jimena Rivas Fernandez	Did not compete		
2003	Montevideo	Natalia Rodriguez Lassiy	Unplaced		
2002	Montevideo	Natalia Figueras Cabezas	Unplaced		
2001	Montevideo	Maria Daniela Abasolo Cugnetti	Unplaced		
2000	Montevideo	Katja Alexandra Thomsen Grien	4th Runner-up		
1999	Montevideo	Katherine Gonçalves Pedrozo	Unplaced		
1998	Montevideo	Maria Desiree Fernandez Mautone	Unplaced		
1997	Montevideo	Ana González Kwasny	Unplaced		
1996	Montevideo	Claudia Verónica Gallarreta Olmedo	Unplaced		
Did not compete between 1994—1995
1993	Montevideo	Maria Fernanda Navarro Guigou	Unplaced		
1992	Montevideo	Leonora Irene Dibueno Fenocchi	Unplaced		
1991	Montevideo	Andrea Regina Gorrochategui Granja	Unplaced		
1990	Montevideo	Maria Carolina Casalia Abelia	Unplaced		
1989	Did not compete				
1988	Montevideo	Gisel Silva Sienra	Unplaced		
1987	Montevideo	Mónica Inés Borrea Vicente	Unplaced		
1986	Montevideo	Alexandra Maria Goldenthal	Unplaced		
1985	Montevideo	Gabriela de León Muniz	Unplaced		
1984	Montevideo	Giselle Barthou Quintes	Unplaced		
1983	Montevideo	Silvia Zumarán	Unplaced		
1982	Montevideo	Varinia Roxana Govea Pazos	Unplaced		
1981	Montevideo	Silia Marianela Bas Carresse	Unplaced		
1980	Montevideo	Ana Claudia Carriquiry	Unplaced		
1979	Montevideo	Laura Rodriguez Delgado	Top 15		
1978	Montevideo	Mabel Rua	Unplaced		
1977	Montevideo	Adriana María Umpierre Escudero	Unplaced		
1976	Montevideo	Sara Alaga Valega	Unplaced		
1975	Montevideo	Carmen Abal	Top 15		
Did not compete between 1966—1974
1965	Montevideo	Raquel Luz Delgado	Unplaced		
1964	Montevideo	Alicia Elena Gómez	Unplaced		
1963	Did not compete				
1962	Montevideo	Maria Noel Genouese	Top 15		
1961	Montevideo	Roma Spadaccini Aguerre	Unplaced		
1960	Montevideo	Beatriz Benítez	Unplaced		
1959	Montevideo	Yvonne Kelly	Unplaced		

=== Miss Internacional Uruguay ===
- : Declared as Winner
- : Ended as runner-up or top 5/6 qualification
- : Ended as one of the finalists or semifinalists
- : Ended as special awards winner

Year	Department	Miss Internacional Uruguay	Placement at Miss International	Special Awards	Notes
Did not compete since 2023—present
2022	Montevideo	Betina Margni Vilas	Did not compete		Miss Internacional Uruguay — Leti Fernandez Feijoo directorship.
Did not compete between 2014—2021
2013	Montevideo	Natalia Sanchez	Did not compete		Withdrawal — Due to internal reasons from the organization — Top 3 of Miss Uruguay 2013 withdrew at International pageants.
Did not compete between 2000—2012
1999	Montevideo	María Daniela Abasolo Cugnetti	Top 15		
Did not compete between 1989—1998
1988	Montevideo	Gisel Silva Sienra	Unplaced		
Did not compete between 1983—1987
1982	Montevideo	Carolina Sibils	Unplaced		
1981	Montevideo	Silvia Alonso	Unplaced		
1980	Montevideo	Erna Isabel Alfonso	Top 13		
1979	Montevideo	Nidia Silvera	Unplaced		
1978	Montevideo	Sara Alaga Valega	Unplaced		
1977	Montevideo	Dinorah González Carpio	Unplaced		
1976	Montevideo	Isabel Ana Ferrero	Unplaced		
1975	Montevideo	Stella Barrios	Unplaced		
1974	Montevideo	Mirta Grazilla Rodríguez	Unplaced		
1973	Did not compete				
1972	Montevideo	Christina Moller	Unplaced		
1971	Montevideo	Carmen López	Unplaced		
Did not compete between 1969—1970
1968	Montevideo	Soledad Gandos	Unplaced		
1967	Montevideo	Raquel Erlich	Unplaced		
Did not compete between 1964—1966
1963	Montevideo	Susana Casañas Méndez	Unplaced		
1962	Montevideo	Silvia Romero	Unplaced		
1961	Montevideo	Mónica Moore Davie	Unplaced	Miss Friendship	
1960	Montevideo	Beatriz Liñares	Unplaced		

=== Miss Tierra Uruguay ===
- : Declared as Winner
- : Ended as runner-up or top 5/6 qualification
- : Ended as one of the finalists or semifinalists
- : Ended as special awards winner

Year	Department	Miss Tierra Uruguay	Placement at Miss Earth	Special Awards	Notes
Did not compete since 2023—present
2022	San Carlos	Lesly Lemos	Did not compete		
2021	Did not compete				
2020	Montevideo	Lorena Sosa	Unplaced		Nadia Cerri (Miss Uruguay TV) directorship.
Did not compete between 2017—2019
2016	Montevideo	Valeria Barrios Ustra	Unplaced	(silver) Resort Wear (Group 3); (bronze) Best Swimsuit (Group 3)	
2015	Montevideo	Maria Belen Cabrera	Unplaced		Reinas de Belleza del Uruguay (Miss Uruguay under VTV) directorship.
Did not compete between 2013—2014
2012	Montevideo	Cynthia Kutscher Kleinschmidt	Unplaced		Miss Earth Uruguay — Casting.
Did not compete between 2005—2011
2004	Montevideo	Katherine Gonçalves Pedrozo	Unplaced		Miss Earth Uruguay — Casting.
