= Lucía Rodríguez (comedian) =

Uruguayan actress, comedian, presenter and carnival performer

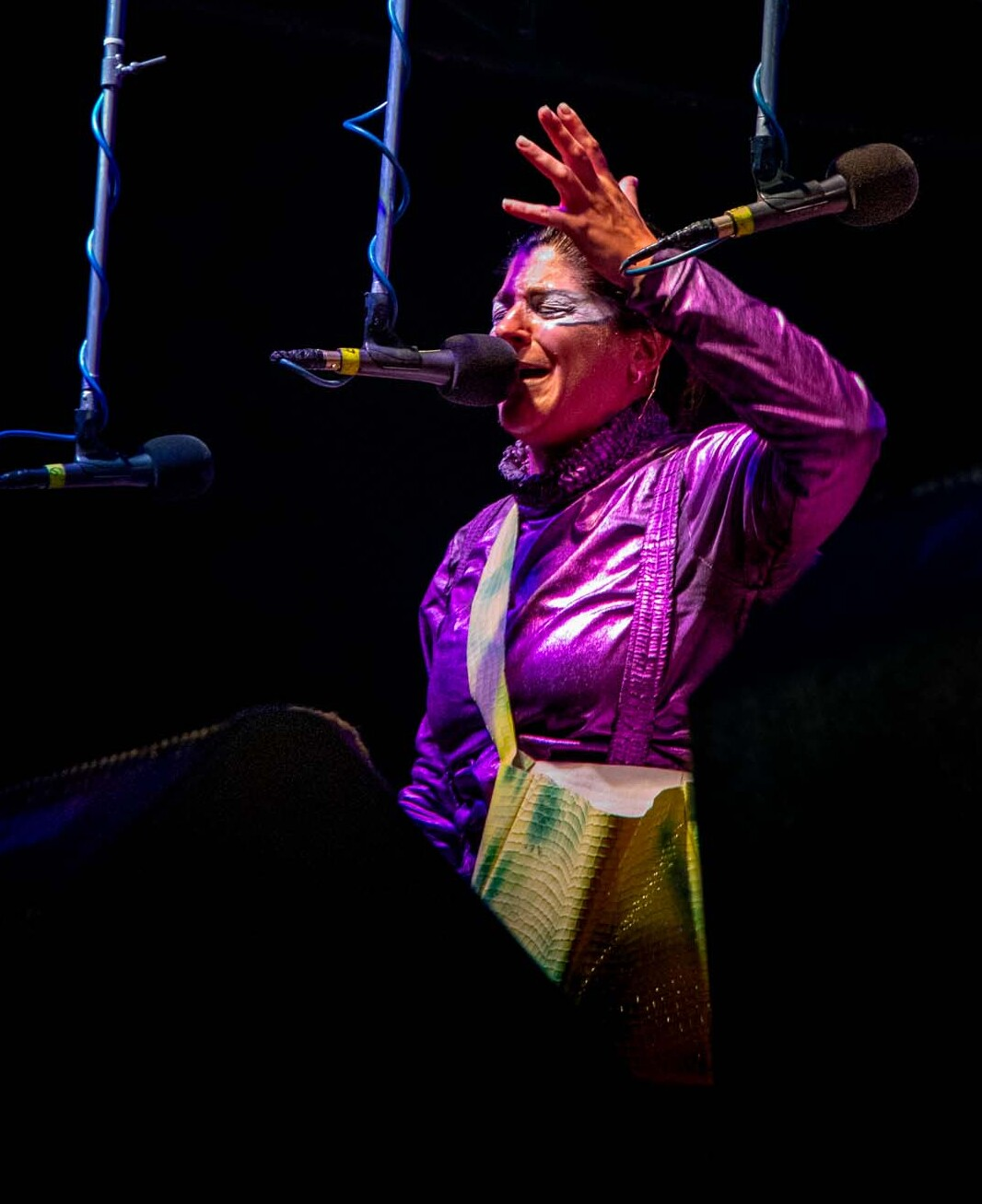
- Rodríguez during a carnival performance, 2024
- Born: Lucía Rodríguez Cabrera; 1 April 1981 (age 45); Montevideo, Uruguay
- Occupations: Comedian; actress; presenter
- Children: 2

Lucía Rodríguez Cabrera (born 3 April 1981) is a Uruguayan comedian, actress and television presenter. She rose to prominence performing comedy sketches with her ex-partner Germán Medina and as a carnival performer. Known for her television work with Teledoce, she has presented Trato hecho (2021–2024), Veo como cantas (2024) and 100 uruguayos dicen (2026–present).

== Early life and education ==
Rodríguez Cabrera was born on April 3, 1981, in Montevideo, the daughter of Juan Rodríguez, a Uruguayan Air Force pilot and Mónica Cabrera, a public employee of the National Children's Institute. She spent most of her childhood in Rivera.

== Career ==
Prior to starting her career in the media, she worked as a Portuguese translator and in customer service at the National Administration of Telecommunications. In 2008 she debuted in carnival shows, as a member of the comedy group Los Carlitos.

== Personal life ==
From 2015 to 2020 she dated fellow comedian Germán Medina. They had a son, Mateo. She also has a son from a previous relationship.

== Filmography ==
Television
Year	Title	Role
2020–2022	La culpa es de Colón	Panelist
2021	Desayunos informales	Panelist
2021–2024	Trato Hecho	Presenter
2022	¿Quién es la máscara?	Contestant; 15th. Eliminated
2024	Veo cómo cantas	Presenter
2025	Tu cara me suena	Judge
2026–present	100 uruguayos dicen	Presenter
