= Victoria Zangaro =

Uruguayan model and TV host

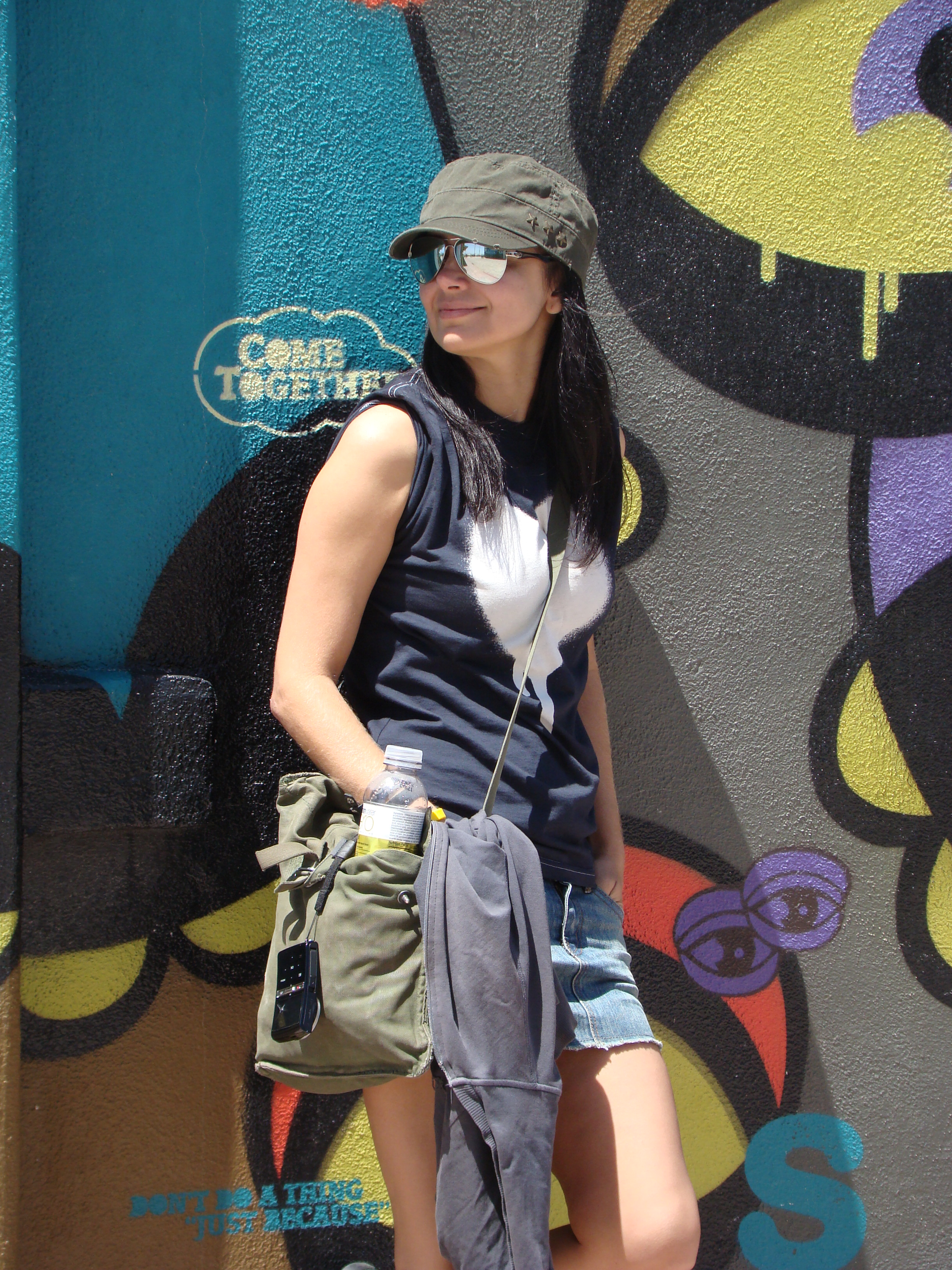
- Born: María Victoria Zangaro Grosso; July 31, 1970 (age 56); Montevideo, Uruguay
- Occupations: Model, television host
- Spouse(s): Daniel Javier (1996-2011); Martín Sarthou (2012-)
- Beauty pageant titleholder
- Eye color: Black
- Major competition: Miss Uruguay 1987

María Victoria Zangaro Grosso (born July 31, 1969) is an Uruguayan model, television personality and television host.

== Career ==
She was crowned Miss Uruguay 1987 and represented her country at the Miss Universe 1987 pageant.

She has worked in Chile, New York and Paris, with the help of the Elite agency. She hosted until 2015 on the VTV channel the program "Día a Día", a daily magazine show with Marcelo Galli. Since July 2015 she hosts Desayunos Informales on Teledoce, a daily morning television show.

== Personal life ==
Between 1996 and 2011, she was married to Daniel Javier. On Sunday, April 22, 2012, she married Martín Sarthou, a journalist with a career in international politics.
