= Universidad ORT Uruguay =

- Logo of ORT Uruguay
- Type: Private, Research
- Established: 1942
- Rector: Dr. Jorge Grünberg
- Students: More than 10,000
- Location: Montevideo, Uruguay
- Campus: Urban
- Website: www.ort.edu.uy

Universidad ORT Uruguay (ORT) is a private research university in Montevideo, Uruguay. Established in 1942 as a technical school and officially recognized as a university in 1996, it is part of the global Jewish educational network World ORT. It enrolls more than 10,000 students across five faculties and two institutes, making it one of the largest private higher education institutions in the country.

== History ==
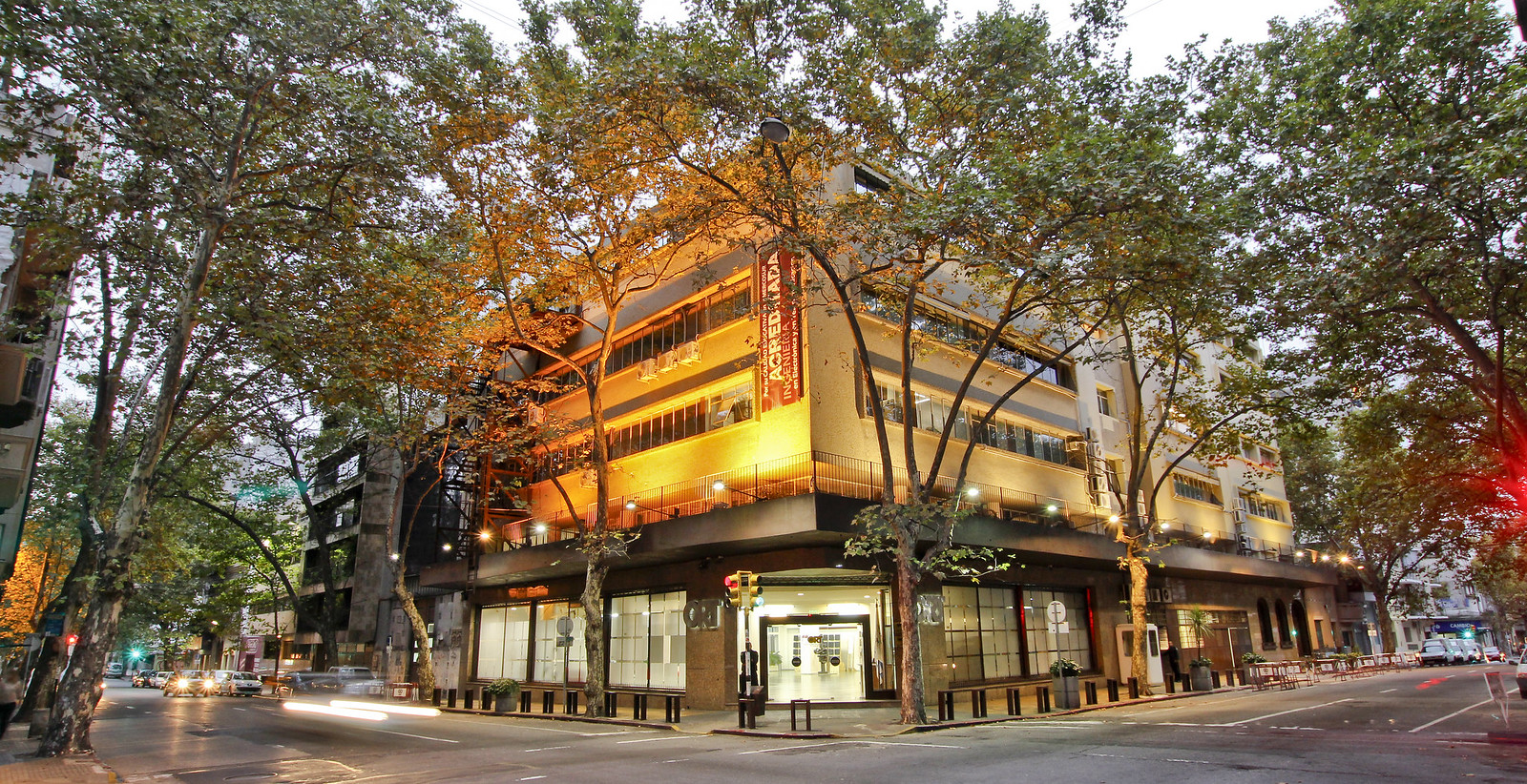
ORT Uruguay building in Central Montevideo

Universidad ORT Uruguay traces its origins to 1942, when it was founded as a technical school by members of Uruguay’s Jewish community. The initiative formed part of the international network of World ORT, established in 1880 in Saint Petersburg, and sought to provide vocational training to immigrants arriving in Uruguay—many of them fleeing Nazism—in order to facilitate their social and economic integration.

By the 1980s, ORT Uruguay had expanded its academic offerings, particularly in electronics and computer science. In 1985, it applied to the Ministry of Education and Culture for official recognition of its tertiary degrees in Systems Analysis and Electronics, which was granted in 1988. These authorisations were among the first granted by the Uruguayan state to a non-governmental tertiary institution. That same year, the institution established the School of Management, regarded as the first business school in Uruguay.

In 1995, the government enacted the country’s first legal framework regulating private universities, at a time when the only university in operation was the public University of the Republic. In February 1996, ORT Uruguay became the first institution to apply for authorisation under the new legislation and was formally recognised as a private university in September of that year.

Between 1996 and 1999, its principal academic faculties were created. The Faculty of Engineering consolidated several pre-existing departments, followed by the Faculty of Administration and Social Sciences—successor to the School of Management—the Faculty of Communication and Design, and, in 1999, the Faculty of Architecture.

In 2003, the Institute of Jewish Studies was reorganised to promote research and outreach activities related to Jewish history and culture in Uruguay, antisemitism, and the Shoah, including seminars, publications and documentary projects. In 2008, the Faculty of Communication and Design signed an academic cooperation agreement with the California Institute of the Arts, supporting the launch of undergraduate programmes in Animation and Video Games.

From 1977 to 2024, the university’s rector was Charlotte de Grünberg, a Belgian-born Holocaust survivor who had resided in Uruguay since 1952. ORT Uruguay is a member of several international academic associations, including the International Association of Universities (IAU) and the Union of Latin American Universities (UDUAL). Its Master of Business Administration (MBA) programme was ranked among the best in Latin America for the 21st consecutive year in 2017, according to the annual ranking published by AméricaEconomía.

== Academics ==
=== Teaching and learning ===
School	Founded
Faculty of Engineering	1996
Faculty of Architecture	1999
Faculty of Administration and Social Sciences	1996
Institute of Education	1998
Faculty of Communication	2024
Faculty of Design	2024
Instituto de Dermatología	2025

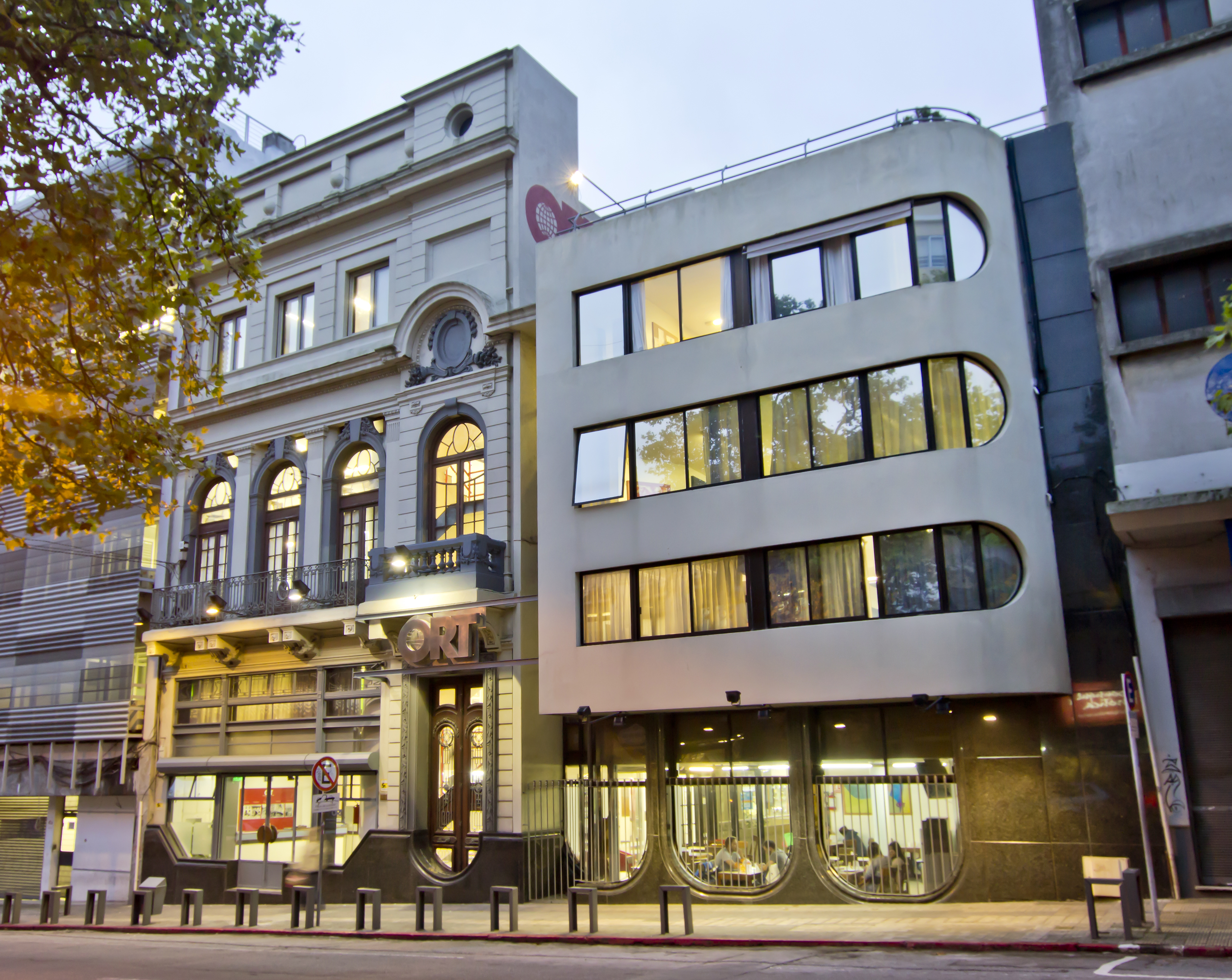
Building of the Faculty of Communication

Universidad ORT Uruguay is a large research university offering 30 undergraduate degree programmes, 24 undergraduate diploma programmes, and 43 postgraduate degrees. Since July 2020, the university has been listed in the Times Higher Education Latin America University Rankings.

ORT’s Graduate School of Business Master of Business Administration (MBA) has been ranked between 131st and 140th globally in the 2021 QS Quacquarelli Symonds Executive MBA Rankings, placing 7th in Latin America and becoming the only MBA programme in Uruguay included in that classification. The programme has also been accredited by the Association of MBAs and was the only Uruguayan MBA featured in the "Global Executive MBA Rankings 2020".

For the twenty-eighth consecutive year (as of September 2023), ORT’s Faculty of Business Administration and Social Sciences has been the only Uruguayan business school ranked among the top 25 in Latin America in the annual ranking conducted by América Economía. In September 2021, QS Quacquarelli Symonds placed the university among the world’s top 550 institutions for graduate employability.

=== Undergraduate degrees ===
==== Faculty of Business Administration and Social Sciences ====
- Public Accountant
- Bachelor in Economics
- Bachelor in International Studies
- Bachelor in Management and Administration
- Bachelor in Marketing and Commercial Management
- Bachelor in Digital Business
- Bachelor in Finance

==== Faculty of Architecture ====
- Architecture Degree
- Bachelor in Interior Design

==== Faculty of Communication ====
- Bachelor in Global Communication
- Bachelor in Communication and Data Analytics
- Bachelor in Advertising and Marketing Communication
- Bachelor in Audiovisual and Film Communication
- Bachelor in Corporate Communication
- Bachelor in Journalism and Content Creation

==== Faculty of Design ====
- Bachelor in Industrial Design
- Bachelor in Design, Art, and Technology
- Bachelor in Multimedia Design
- Bachelor in Animation and Video Games
- Bachelor in Fashion Design
- Bachelor in Graphic Design

==== Faculty of Engineering ====
- Electrical Engineering
- Biotechnology Engineering
- Electronic Engineering
- Computer Systems Engineering
- Telecommunications Engineering
- Bachelor in Biotechnology
- Bachelor in Information Systems
- Bachelor of Bioinformatics

=== Postgraduate degrees ===
==== Faculty of Business Administration and Social Sciences ====
- Master of Business Administration – MBA
- Executive MBA (Blended)
- Master in Commercial Management and Marketing
- Postgraduate Diploma in Business Analytics
- Postgraduate Diploma in Accounting
- Postgraduate Diploma in Finance
- Postgraduate Diploma in International Taxation
- Postgraduate Diploma in Taxation
- Postgraduate Diploma in Marketing
- Postgraduate Diploma in Human Resources
- Master in Accounting and Finance
- Master in Human Resources Management
- Master in Financial Management
- Master in Taxation and International Tax Law
- Master in Taxation and Accounting Standards (IFRS)

==== Faculty of Architecture ====
- Postgraduate Diploma in Sustainable Architecture
- Postgraduate Diploma in Real Estate Business
- Master in Timber Constructions

==== Faculty of Communication ====
- Master in Strategic Design and Innovation
- Postgraduate Diploma in User Experience Design
- Master in Creativity, Innovation, and Communication
- Postgraduate Diploma in Creativity and Innovation
- Master in Communication and Marketing Management
- Postgraduate Diploma in Communication Management
- Master in Fashion Management and Communication
- Postgraduate Diploma in Fashion Business and Management

==== Faculty of Engineering ====
- Postgraduate Diploma in Big Data Analytics
- Postgraduate Diploma in Information Systems Management
- Postgraduate Diploma in Artificial Intelligence
- PhD in Engineering
- Master in Big Data
- Master in Information Systems Management
- Master in Engineering (by Research)
- Master in Artificial Intelligence

==== Institute of Dermatology ====
- Postgraduate Specialization in Medical-Surgical Dermatology

==== Institute of Education ====
- Postgraduate Diploma in Teaching English as a Foreign Language
- Diploma in Education
- Diploma in Teacher Training
- Diploma in Educational Planning and Management
- PhD in Education
- Master in Education
- Master in Teacher Training
- Master in Educational Management

== Notable people ==
- Verónica Alonso, politician
- Álvaro Delgado, politician and veterinarian
- Gabriela Hearst, women's luxury ready-to-wear and accessories designer.
- Camila Rajchman, singer and television personality
- Sofía Rodríguez, television journalist
