= Jorge Echagüe =

Uruguayan actor, singer and television presenter

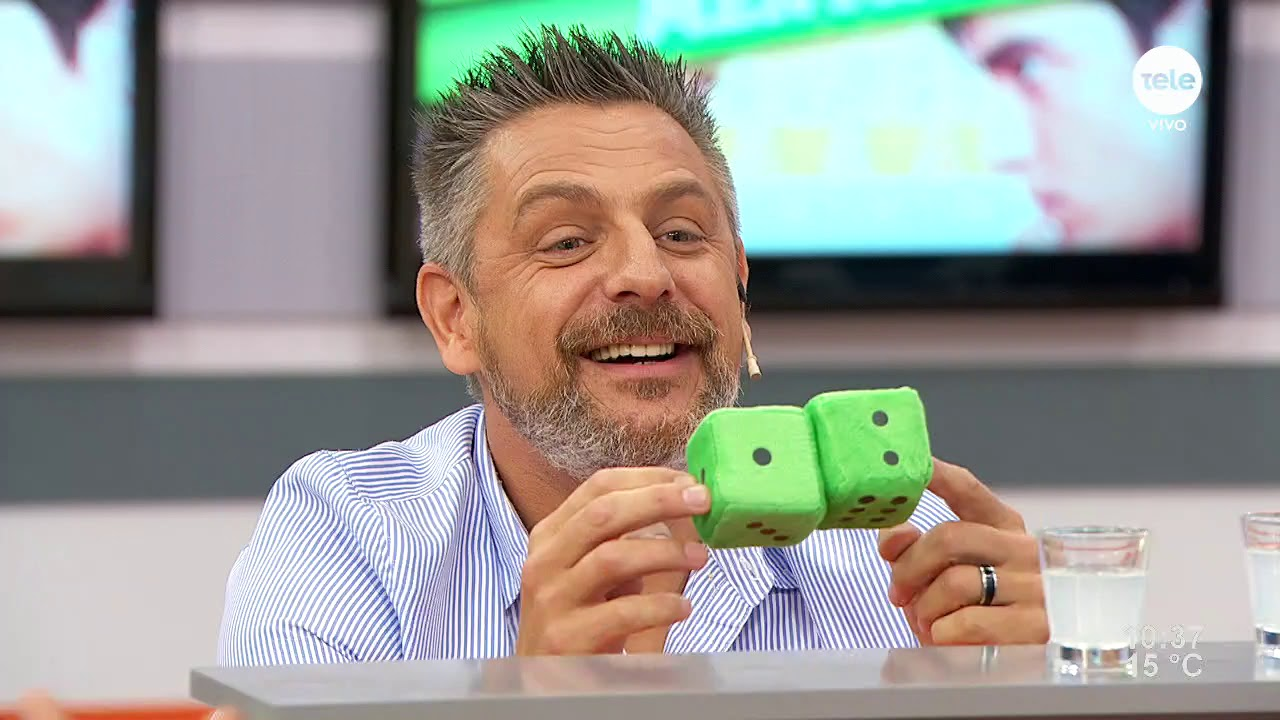
- Born: June 17, 1971 (age 54)
- Occupation: Actor; Singer; Television presenter
- Television: Desayunos informales
- Awards: Florencio Award

Jorge Echagüe, popularly known as Coco Echagüe, (born June 17, 1971) is a Uruguayan actor, singer and television presenter.

== Television ==
Year	Title	Role	Channel
1999	Guau	Himself	Teledoce
2000	Camino al éxito	Himself–Host	Teledoce
2000	Viva la salsa	Himself	Teledoce
2004–2010	Loco de vos	Himself–Host	Channel 10
2004–2020	Pasión de Carnaval	Himself–Host	VTV
2010–2011	Porque te quiero así	Miguel "Lito" González	Channel 10
2011	Sr. y Sra. Camas	Coco	TV Pública Digital
2017–present	Desayunos informales	Himself–Host	Teledoce
2022	El Último Pasajero	Himself–Host	Teledoce
2024	Margarita	Rey's father	Max

== Theater ==
Year	Title	Director
2019	Perfectos Desconocidos	Álvaro Ahunchain
2019	Amor de película	Diego Devincenzi
