= Cumbia pop =

- Other names: Cumbia cheta
- Stylistic origins: Cumbia; pop; Latin pop
- Cultural origins: 2000s–2010s, Uruguay and Argentina
- Typical instruments: Guitar; bass; drums; keyboards; keytar; accordion; güiro; vocals

Cumbia pop, also known as Cumbia cheta (Note: Translated from Rioplatense Spanish into English as "Fancy Cumbia" or "Posh cumbia".), is a musical subgenre that fuses cumbia with elements of pop and Latin pop. Originated in the 2000s in the Río de la Plata region (which encompasses Uruguay and Argentina), it went mainstream in the 2010s, with the formation of several bands that gained widespread popularity.

== History ==
=== Influences and development ===
The cumbia pop genre emerged in the mid-2000s when some musical groups from Uruguay and Argentina made covers of popular songs, mixing them with cumbia and pop elements, and published them on YouTube. One of the pioneers was the Uruguayan group VI-EM, followed by the Argentine group Agapornis. However, it did not gain as much notoriety, but at that time other subgenres such as cumbia villera were more popular.

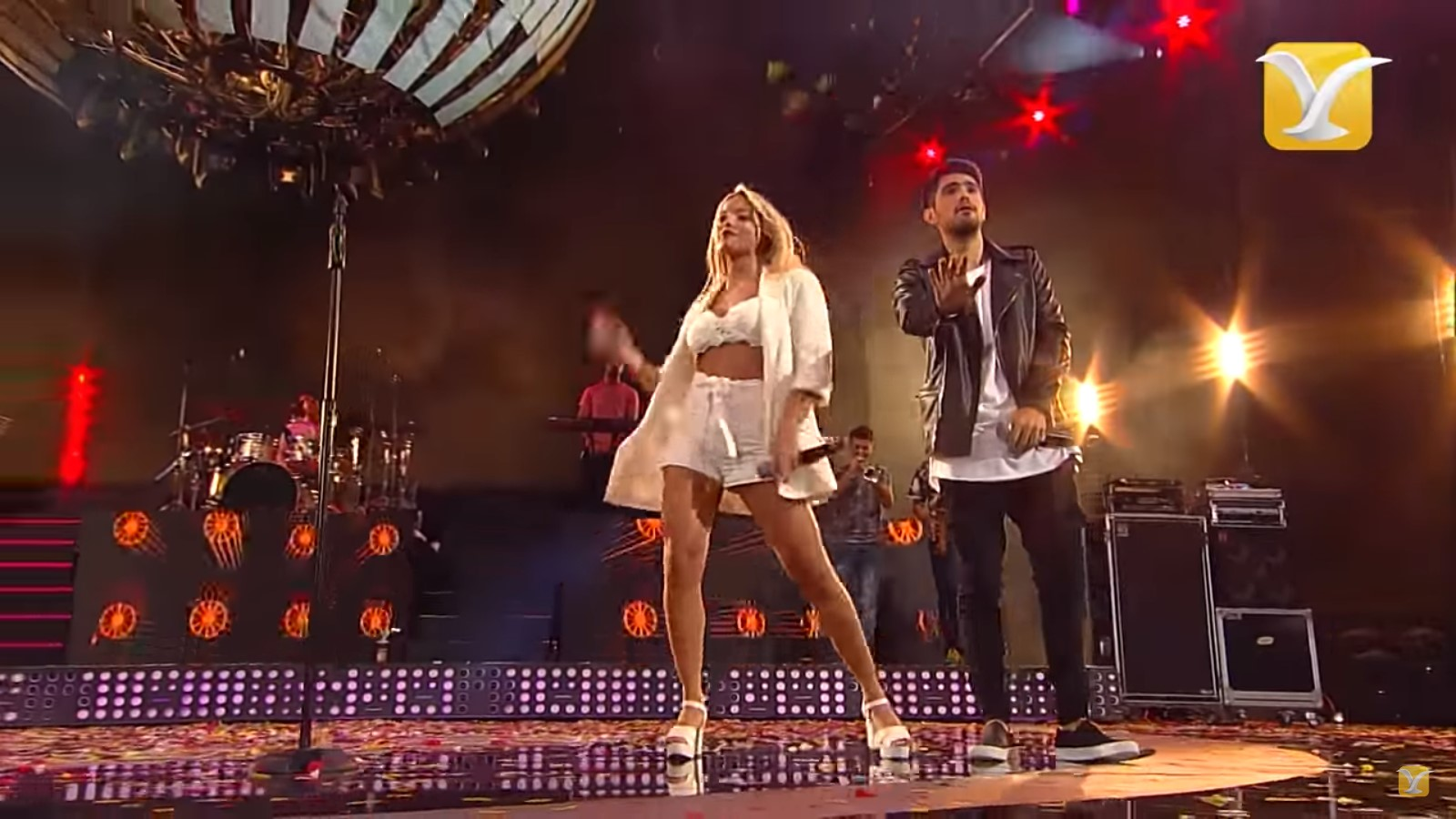
Rombai performing in 2017

Beginning in 2013–2014, cumbia pop went mainstream with the formation in Montevideo of the Uruguayan bands Rombai and Márama, which became extremely popular in Uruguay, Argentina, and other Latin American countries. They adopted danceable rhythms and lyrics related to love and youth life, as both groups were composed of people in their 20s, and included elements of pop and electropop, giving the musical genre its definitive shape. These bands toured several seaside towns and released summer hits, which increased their notoriety among young people.

Since the members of the most popular bands were youngsters from the upper-middle class or upper class, and since the lyrics and music videos showcased luxury, exclusive parties, and aspirational lifestyles, this subgenre also became known as Cumbia Cheta. "Cheta"—the feminine form of the word "cheto"—is a slang from Rioplatense Spanish used to describe someone or something associated with the upper class. Cumbia pop broke away from the traditional association of cumbia with working-class and middle-class people and aligned itself with the internationally popular pop and Latin pop music.

Given the rise of the genre, other bands emerged that also achieved wide popularity, such as the Uruguayan Toco Para Vos, Canto Para Bailar and Dame 5, and the Argentine Pijama Party.
