= Leonardo Haberkorn =

Uruguayan journalist, professor and writer

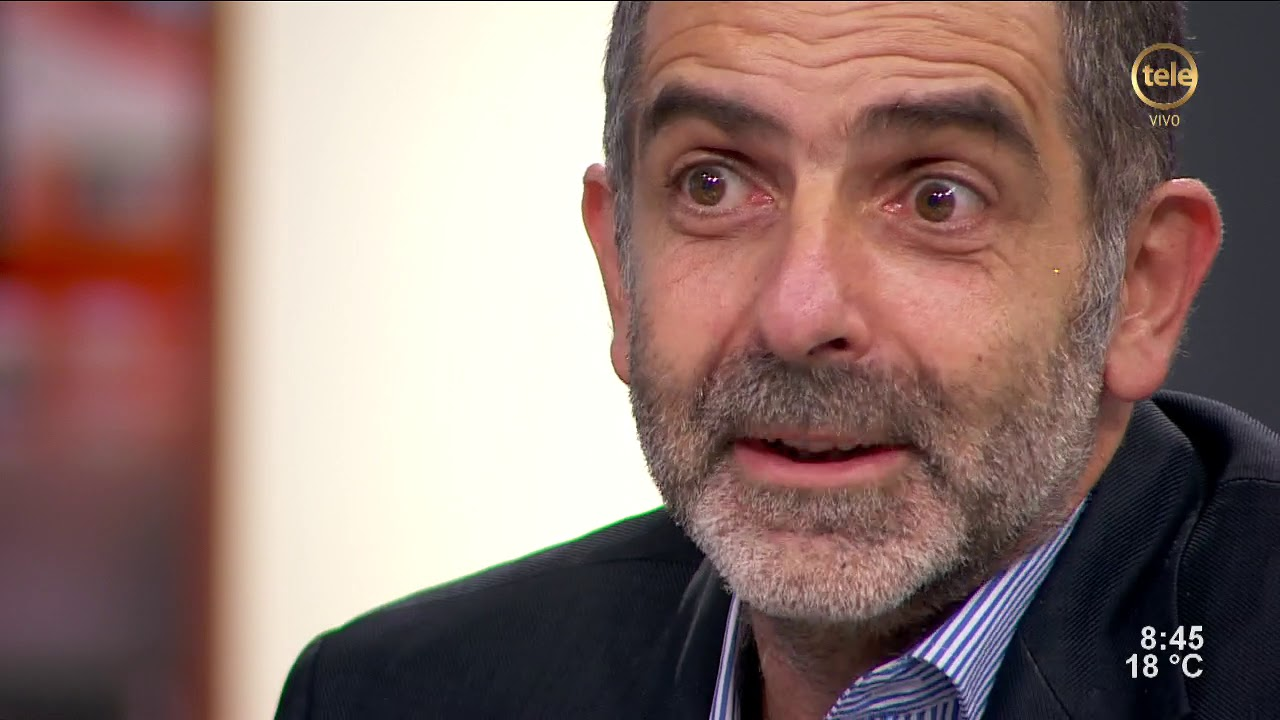
- Born: Leonardo Haberkorn Manevich; 27 December 1963 (age 62); URU Montevideo, Uruguay
- Occupations: writern, journalist,professor
- Awards: Premio Libro de Oro; Premio Bartolomé Hidalgo; Premio Morosoli

Leonardo Haberkorn Manevich (born 27 December 1963 in Montevideo) is a Uruguayan journalist, professor and writer.

== Works ==
- 2004, Nueve historias uruguayas. Ediciones de la Plaza. ISBN 997448084-1
- 2005, Historia de Peñarol (with Luciano Álvarez). Aguilar. ISBN 9789974950245
- 2008, Historias tupamaras. Nuevos testimonios sobre los mitos del MLN. Fin de Siglo. ISBN 9789974494381
- 2008, Preguntas y respuestas sobre animales del Uruguay (children's book). Sudamericana. ISBN 9789974814103
- 2009, Crónicas de sangre, sudor y lágrimas. Fin de Siglo.
- 2012, Animales del Uruguay II. Preguntas y respuestas para mentes inquietas (children's book). Sudamericana. ISBN 9789974701045
- El dulce de leche, una historia uruguaya
- Guía Ecoturística de los Bañados del Este (various authors; published by Probides)
- Bordes y confines (various authors; published by the Colombian chancellery)
- Barrio Peñarol: patrimonio industrial ferroviario (various authors; published by IMM and Claeh)
- 2011, Milicos y tupas. Fin de Siglo (5th ed.) ISBN 978-9974495128
- 2012, Relato oculto. Las desmemorias de Víctor Hugo Morales (with Luciano Álvarez). Planeta. ISBN 9789974700109
- 2013, Pablo Bengoechea, la clase del Profesor. Debolsillo. ISBN 9789974701748
- 2014, Liberaij. La verdadera historia del caso Plata quemada. Sudamericana.
- 2025, Carbonero querido. (history of Peñarol for children)
