= Quinta Vergara Amphitheater =

Open-air theatre in Viña del Mar, Chile

Coordinates: 33.029651°S 71.552431°W

- Anfiteatro de la Quinta Vergara
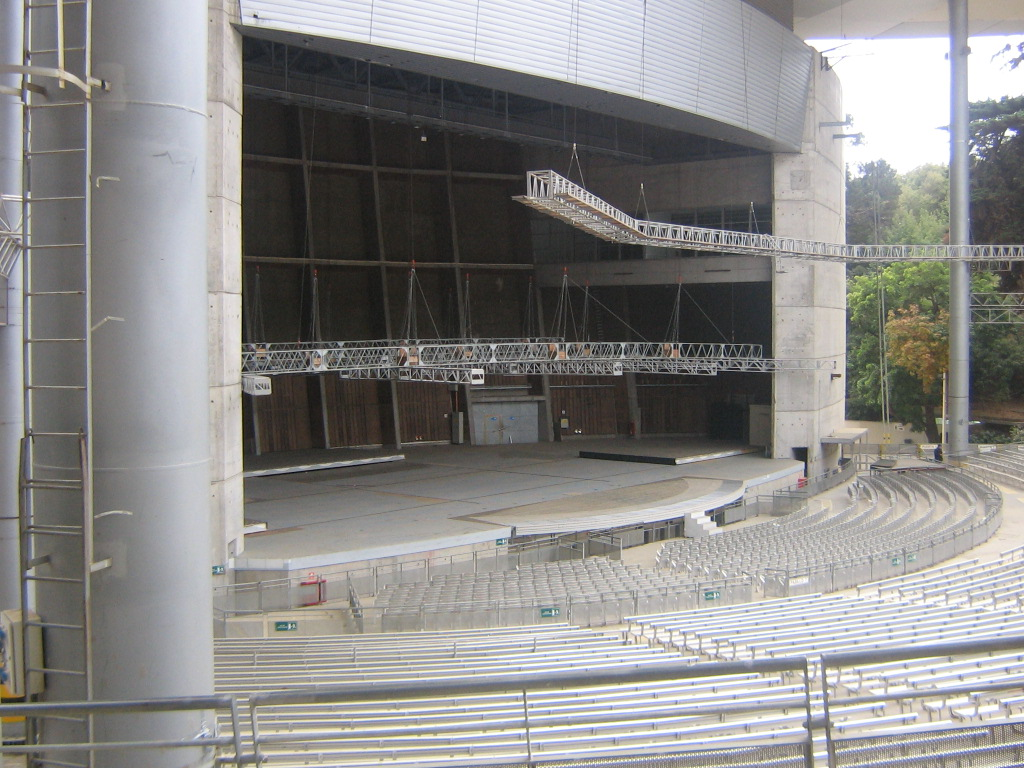
- Interactive map of Quinta Vergara Amphitheater
- Location: Viña del Mar, Chile
- Capacity: 20,000
- Type: Amphitheater

Construction
- Opened: 1963
- Renovated: 2002

The Quinta Vergara Amphitheater is an open-air theatre and concert venue within the Parque Quinta Vergara in Viña del Mar, Chile. It hosts the Viña del Mar International Song Festival held yearly in February. The venue is owned by the Viña del Mar Municipality.

== History ==
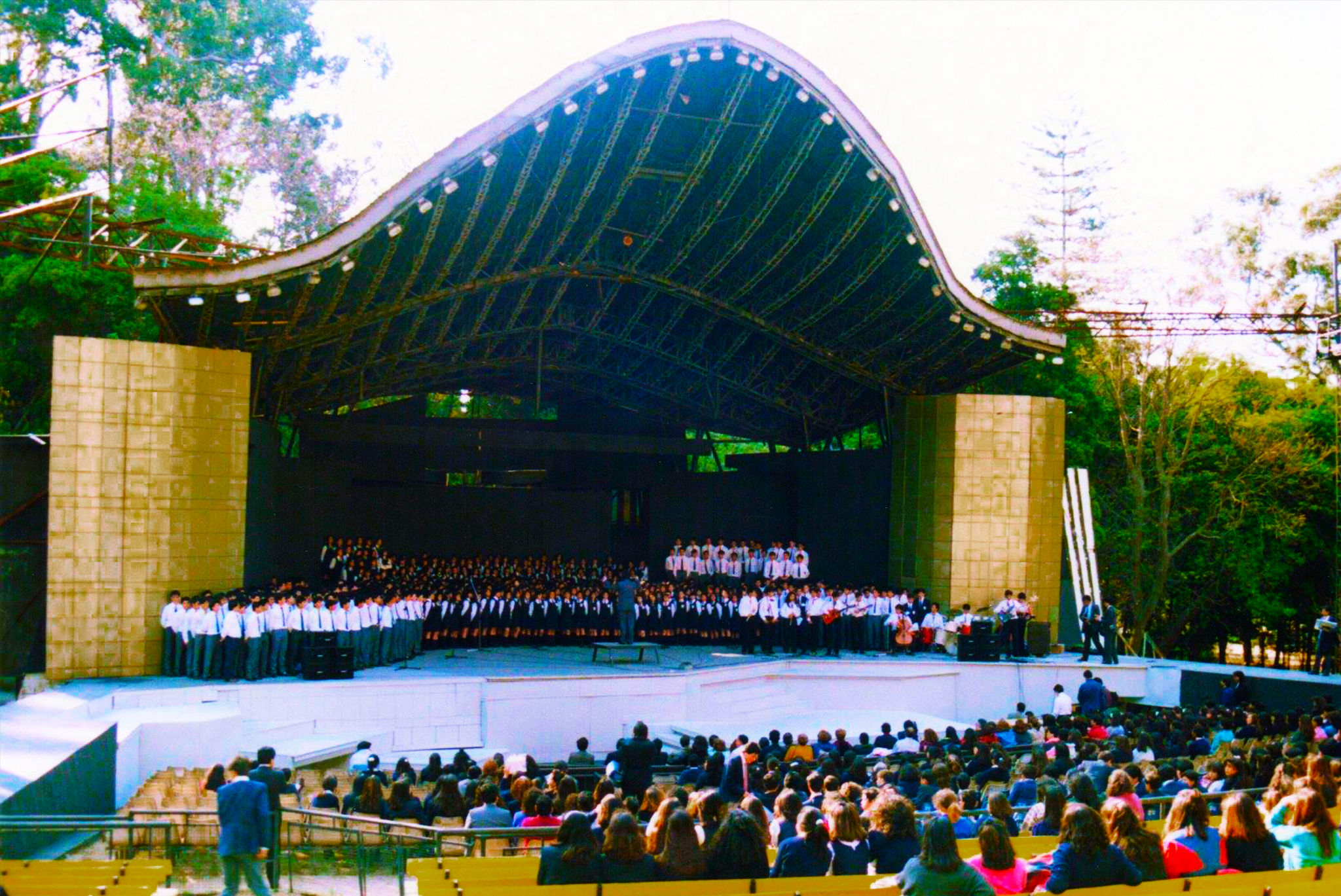
Stage of the Quinta Vergara in 1991.

After the success of the first Viña del Mar International Song Festival in 1960, it was decided to replace the stage with a more stable one. In 1963 the architect Hernando López began the construction of the venue, which would be a wood structure that was like an "acoustic shell" that helped the artist to project the sound to the audience and to protect the artists from the elements.

In 2002 the amphitheater was renovated by replacing the wooden shell structure with a concrete structure. This structure is the one that is currently standing. With this renovation, the capacity of the amphitheater was upgraded from 15,000 to 20,000 (which is the current capacity).

On July 11, 2023, the mayor of Viña del Mar and television presenter Mario Kreutzberger announced that Teletón Chile will have its finale in the amphitheater, marking the first time in 28 years that the campaign will close somewhere else than the Estadio Nacional Julio Martínez Prádanos (excluding 2014, 2020, and 2021). In 2024, Viña Del Mar will once again host Teleton as they did in 2023.
