= Cable news in the United States =

News disseminated through cable television networks

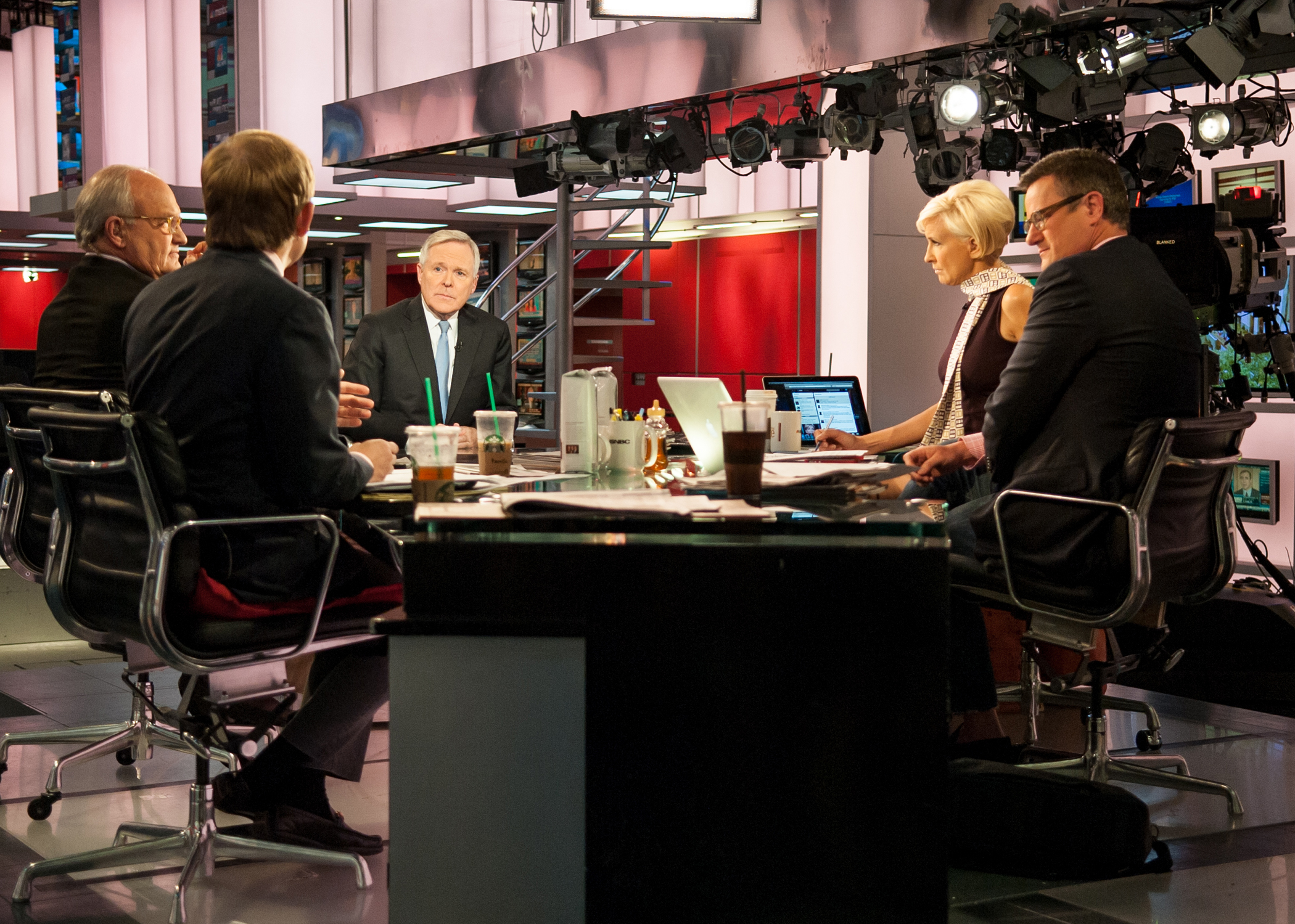
Morning Joe, a cable news program on MSNBC

Cable news channels are television networks devoted to television news broadcasts, with the name deriving from the proliferation of such networks during the 1980s with the advent of cable television.

In the United States, the first nationwide cable TV news channel to launch was CNN in 1980,followed by Financial News Network (FNN) in 1981 and CNN2 (now HLN) in 1982. CNBC was created in 1989, taking control of FNN in 1991. Through the 1990s and beyond, the cable news industry continued to grow, with the establishment of several other networks, including, Fox News Channel, MS NOW, and specialty channels such as Bloomberg Television, Fox Business Network, and ESPN News. More recent additions to the cable news business have been CBSN, Newsmax TV, TheBlaze, NewsNation, part-time news network RFD-TV, and the now defunct Al Jazeera America and Black News Channel.

As some of the most widely available channels, Fox News, CNN, and MS NOW are often referred to as the "big three" with Fox News having the highest viewership and ratings. While the networks are usually referred to as 24-hour news networks, reruns of news programs and analysis or opinion programming are played throughout the night, with the exception of breaking news.

Regional 24-hour cable news television channels that are primarily concerned with local programming and cover some statewide interest have included Spectrum News (a brand used for multiple networks including in upstate New York, North Carolina, Florida and Texas), NY1 (which operates from New York City), News 12 Networks, FiOS1, and the former Northwest Cable News (NWCN) (which operated from Seattle). New England Cable News covers the six-state region of New England.

== "Big Three" news channels ==
Listed by the number of viewers, the 'Big Three' cable TV news channels are:

=== Fox News Channel ===

Fox News Channel (Fox News) launched on October 7, 1996, and was formed under the ownership of News Corporation (founded by Australian-born media mogul Rupert Murdoch), the fifth largest media company in the United States behind Sony, the original Viacom (now Paramount Skydance), Time Warner (now Warner Bros. Discovery), The Walt Disney Company, Seagram (now NBCUniversal) and MGM (now Amazon). The network is headed by chief executive officer Rupert Murdoch. The network began broadcasting its programming in high definition TV in May 2008.

Since the network's launch, Fox News has gradually grown to become the highest-rated cable network until January 2021, when MSNBC surpassed Fox News briefly before returning to the number two position in February. Fox News's former prime time lineup included programs such as The O'Reilly Factor, hosted by Bill O'Reilly, which had been a top rated program since the early 2000s when considered among major cable news channels. The channel's longtime slogans are "Fair and Balanced" and "We Report, You Decide". Current slogans are "Most Watched. Most Trusted."; "Real News. Real Honest Opinion." and "America's Watching".

=== MS NOW ===

MS NOW launched as MSNBC on July 15, 1996, as a partnership between NBC and Microsoft (Microsoft's stake in the channel was gradually bought out by NBC until the latter's parent NBCUniversal bought out the remaining minority stake held by Microsoft in 2011). When the network was launched, its leading hosts included Jodi Applegate, John Gibson, Tim Russert and Brian Williams. For over a decade, the network's ratings were consistently in last place among the cable news channels until February 2021 when MSNBC became the highest watched news channel.

After Phil Griffin became president of MS NOW in mid-2008, the channel began shifting towards an increasingly politically liberal ideology in its analysis programming, particularly in its prime-time lineup. MS NOW launched a high definition simulcast feed on June 29, 2009.

Notable personalities on the network include Morning Joe co-hosts Joe Scarborough and Mika Brzezinski, daytime anchors Katy Tur and Nicolle Wallace, and evening commentators Chris Hayes and Rachel Maddow. The network was noted in the mid-2000s for its harsh criticism of then-President George W. Bush, most notably the "special comment" segment of former anchor Keith Olbermann's show, Countdown. This, combined with accusations of support for then-President Barack Obama, have led to MS NOW being criticized for a liberal bias, a reputation it has increasingly embraced with its "Lean Forward" slogan (which it adopted in 2011) and open promotion of progressive and liberal ideas. This has led to MS NOW increasingly shifting towards centrism and establishment politics, displaying (subtly or otherwise) acts of hostility towards progressive politicians e.g. Vermont Senator Bernie Sanders (a frontrunner in the 2016 and 2020 Democratic presidential primaries). The channel had a spin-off called Shift. Established in 2014, it was an online-only channel through its website ms.now. The programming schedule was less focused on politics than the main channel, built to be a divergence from it and is more tailored to a younger audience. Shift ceased operations without notice some time before 2018.

=== CNN ===
Cable News Network (CNN) launched on June 1, 1980, as the first cable channel devoted to news programming. The Persian Gulf War in 1991 catapulted CNN into the spotlight, largely because the channel was the only news outlet with the ability to communicate from inside Iraq during the initial hours of the American bombing campaign, with live reports from the al-Rashid Hotel in Baghdad by reporters Bernard Shaw, John Holliman and Peter Arnett. Throughout the 1990s, CNN (which was at the time the only major cable news channel) became very influential, an influence later coined as the CNN effect.

CNN was the first cable news network to begin broadcasting in high definition in September 2007. Today, CNN's television personalities include Wolf Blitzer, Erin Burnett, Anderson Cooper and Jake Tapper.

==== CNN spinoffs ====
In 1982, the Turner Broadcasting System (which would merge with Time Warner in 1996) created a spin-off of CNN called CNN2, which was originally formatted to show the top news stories of the day on a 30-minute "wheel" schedule. The channel rebranded as CNN Headline News in 1983, before the network abandoned the CNN branding and changed its name to the orphaned initialism HLN in 2008, following a shift from news programming towards a mix of news during the day and discussion programs and documentary series at night that began two years earlier.

Turner founded CNN International in 1985, with a straight focus on international news stories compared to CNN, which featured an equal emphasis on U.S. and world news. CNN launched a special service on January 20, 1992, called CNN Airport Network which was available exclusively in United States airports; the service simulcast programs from CNN and HLN, but with inserts of information of interest to air travelers. CNN Airport Network shut down in 2020. CNN also operates a Spanish language service, CNN en Español.

CNN en Español

Turner Broadcasting also established two, now defunct networks. CNNfn, launched at the end of 1995, attempting to challenge CNBC. It ceased operations after nine years on the air in December 2004. CNNSI, a partnership between CNN and Sports Illustrated, attempted to counter the rising success of ESPNews in covering sports news. While the network was shut down, CNN and Sports Illustrated continue to maintain their partnership, with Sports Illustrated operating a sports section on CNN's website. An online offshoot, CNN+, operated for one month in April 2022 before it was aborted due to poor uptake.

=== Ratings ===
Fox News has been number one among cable news audiences since supplanting CNN in 2002. Until the start of 2002, CNN was the number one cable news network in the ratings.

Starting in 2013, a major ratings decline at MS NOW has pushed that network to fourth place in March 2015.

Fox News marked its 15th year as the highest-rated cable news channel in the same demographic, posting 2.8 million average total viewers in January 2017. MS NOW beat CNN in total primetime viewers, ranking sixth among all cable networks in January. CNN beat MS NOW, but trailed to the first place Fox News Channel, in total daytime viewers.

== Minor news channels ==
=== Domestic news and opinion cable channels ===
==== Newsmax TV ====
Newsmax logo

Newsmax TV debuted June 15, 2014 as a television arm of Newsmax Media, a media company better known for its magazine and website. The channel runs a mix of rolling news coverage in the afternoons, video simulcasts of conservative talk radio programs, talk shows, and reruns of documentaries. Talent on the network includes Greta van Susteren, Greg Kelly, Carl Higbie, Tom Basile, Rita Cosby, Rob Schmitt and Chris Salcedo. Former talent includes Eric Bolling, Howie Carr, Wayne Allyn Root, Joe Pagliarulo and Bill O'Reilly. Until mid-2016, it was distributed on both Dish Network and DirecTV. The channel does have numerous local broadcasting affiliates. A live stream of the channel is also available for free online at NewsmaxTV.com, as well as YouTube. Newsmax TV is explicitly conservative in its lean, broadcasting many programs hosted by conservative media personalities including those largely abandoned by Fox News; it is positioned further to the right of Fox News's editorial stance but not as far to the fringe as One America News Network.

The network saw noticeable gains following the 2020 United States presidential election, beating out the business news networks, as conservatives showed increasing dissatisfaction with Fox News coverage of the election.

==== NewsNation ====

Nexstar Media Group's NewsNation is a news channel that replaced general entertainment channel WGN America (itself the successor to the superstation feed of WGN-TV in Chicago) on March 1, 2021. The NewsNation brand was introduced for a prime time news block on WGN on September 1, 2020, six months before the scheduled rebranding of the channel as a whole. NewsNation's focus intends to be non-ideological, using its extensive network of local newsrooms from television stations Nexstar owns and/or operates across the United States. Talent on the network includes Dan Abrams, Ashleigh Banfield and Chris Cuomo. The network transitioned to a full 24/7 schedule in the summer of 2024 after its final WGN-era contracts for syndicated programming were exhausted.

==== Blaze TV ====
Blaze TV is a news and opinion network operated by Blaze Media, a joint venture between Conservative Review and Glenn Beck's Mercury Radio Arts. It began September 12, 2012 as GBTV, initially controlled solely by Beck, and formed the joint venture December 3, 2018, taking on the programming of CRTV, Conservative Review's subscription video service that had launched in October 2016. Blaze TV is explicitly conservative in perspective, with popular hosts on the network including Beck, Mark Levin, Pat Gray, Steve Deace, Steven Crowder and Phil Robertson. Blaze TV is available via Dish Network and Verizon FiOS, various smaller cable providers, and through subscription Internet television.

==== Free Speech TV ====

Free Speech TV (FSTV) is a national, independent, progressive news network that reaches more than 40 million television households in the United States. The network brands itself as "the alternative to television networks owned by billionaires, governments and corporations." It was launched in 1995 and is owned and operated by Public Communicators Incorporated, a 501(c)3 non-profit, tax-exempt organization founded in 1974. Distributed principally by Dish Network, DirecTV, and the network's live stream at freespeech.org and on Roku, Free Speech TV has run commercial free since 1995 with support from viewers and foundations. The network claims to "amplify underrepresented voices and those working on the front lines of social, economic and environmental justice," bringing viewers an array of daily news programs, independent documentaries and special events coverage. In practice, the network's political leanings represent a left-wing perspective, with several progressive talk radio hosts having time slots on the network and the network simulcasting Democracy Now! with longtime progressive radio network Pacifica.

==== RFD-TV ====
RFD-TV (Rural Free Delivery Television) is a rural-oriented television network independently owned and operated by Patrick Gottsch, through his company Rural Media Group. The majority of its daytime weekday programming is devoted to news coverage, including outside-produced newscasts such as U.S. Farm Report, AgDay and This Week in Agribusiness, the network's nightly Rural Evening News, and a five-hour rolling news coverage block centered on agricultural commodities coverage with news and weather. RFD-TV is available through both national satellite providers, on some cable outlets, and through a paywalled Internet stream.

=== IPTV channels ===
==== One America News Network ====
One America News Network (OANN) was launched in the summer of 2013 by Herring Networks, initially under the cooperation of The Washington Times. In 2019, OAN said that it reached 35 million homes. Its primary outlet was through DirecTV, which distributed the channel through its namesake satellite service and U-verse fiber-optic system; DirecTV provided an estimated 90% of the network's revenue until the company announced its intent to drop OANN in April 2022. Verizon Fios, the largest carrier outside of DirecTV to carry the network, followed suit in dropping OANN in July. Its primary method of distribution since the Fios discontinuation has been through its free platform, OAN Plus, made available through digital subchannels.

The channel targets a conservative audience. Initially offering a combination of conservative opinion content and non-ideologically driven news content from its launch until 2016, the channel shifted to shilling for Donald Trump during and after his presidency. Its prime time political talk shows have a conservative perspective, and the channel regularly features pro-Trump stories. The channel described itself as one of the "greatest supporters" of Trump. The channel has been noted for promoting falsehoods and conspiracy theories.

==== Real America's Voice ====
Real America's Voice was launched in 2020 and offers political news coverage as well as coverage of political rallies by the Republican Party candidates running for US President, US Senate, US House, state gubernatorial and state legislature. The channel also offers programs hosted by Charlie Kirk, Grant Stinchfield, among others.

==== Scripps News ====
Scripps News began in 2008 as Newsy, a syndication service providing news videos to mobile and Web users. It was acquired by The E. W. Scripps Company, an owner of local television stations, in 2014 and transformed into its current form, a linear channel devoted to rolling news coverage and short-form videos. Originally distributed solely via over-the-top platforms, Newsy was offered to cable outlets in late 2017, and later on free over-the-air digital television from 2021 to 2024. Newsy was rebranded into Scripps News on January 1, 2023.

=== Foreign cable news networks with U.S. operations ===
==== Al Jazeera English ====
Al Jazeera English (AJE) is Al Jazeera Media Network's English language international news channel. It was the first English-language news channel to be headquartered in the Middle East. Instead of being run centrally, news management rotates between broadcasting centres in Doha and London.

The channel, however, has poor penetration in the American market, where it has been carried by only one satellite service and a small number of cable networks. Al Jazeera English later began a campaign to enter the North American market, including a dedicated website. It became available to some cable subscribers in New York in August 2011, having previously been available as an option for some viewers in Washington, D.C., Ohio and Los Angeles. The channel primarily reaches the United States via its live online streaming. It is readily available on most major Canadian television providers including Rogers and Bell Satellite TV after the Canadian Radio-television and Telecommunications Commission approved the channel for distribution in Canada on 26 November 2009. In 2013, Al Aazeera Media Network bought Current TV and created Al Jazeera America which was based out of New York City and aimed directly at the American market. The channel while having decent carriage on American satellite and cable services was closed in 2017 after sustaining large financial losses for the network.

The channel may also be viewed online. It recommends online viewing at its own website or at its channel on YouTube.

==== BBC News ====

BBC News is the BBC's international news and current affairs television channel. While the channel does not specifically target the U.S., the BBC has a bureau in Washington, D.C., and produces two programs that cover U.S. news and politics: BBC World News America and The Context. These shows are also broadcast on public television stations, as well as half-hour BBC News bulletins. BBC News has covered both U.S. presidential and midterm elections results. The BBC produces weather forecasts for the U.S. and Canada and runs advertisements on the U.S. feed, as foreign broadcasts are not covered by the United Kingdom television license. The channel is carried on Cablevision, Comcast, Spectrum, Verizon FiOS, DirecTV, and AT&T U-Verse, as well as internet TV providers YouTube TV and Sling TV. A 2018 survey for Research Intelligencer by Brand Keys found that the BBC was the most trusted TV news brand among American viewers, beating out Fox News and PBS.

==== CGTN America ====

CGTN America is the American division of China Global Television Network, the English-language news channel run by Chinese state broadcaster China Central Television. It is based in Washington, D.C. and manages bureaus across North and South America. The service launched in 2012 as CCTV America and employs a mix of American, international and Chinese journalists and produces Americas-based programming with a focus on Asia for CGTN. The channel is carried on DirecTV, Dish Network, AT&T U-Verse and smaller carriers and live streams via its website and Livestream. CGTN has been registered as a foreign agent since 2018 and designated a foreign mission since 2020, which restricts the service's operations in the United States.

==== CNC World ====
CNC World is an English-language network majority owned by Xinhua, the Chinese state news agency. It has a more explicit propaganda aim than CGTN and is closely intertwined with the Chinese Communist Party. Its U.S. operations are based in New York City. The channel is available through digital subchannels and a live stream on the Internet. CNC World has been registered as a foreign agent since 2018 and designated a foreign mission since 2020, which restricts the service's operations in the United States.

==== i24News ====

i24NEWS is an English language international news television channel that is owned by Patrick Drahi. It is the English version of i24NEWS, a news service based in Israel and operated as a joint venture by Israel's two most prominent commercial broadcasters. The network began broadcasting in the US on February 13, 2017. It is live from 6-10 p.m. Eastern Time and at other times broadcasts from Israel. Live programming is broadcast from Times Square in New York with an additional bureau in Washington, D.C. The channel uses resources from i24's main Jaffa headquarters. Talent includes David Shuster who is also the managing editor, Michelle Makori, and Dan Raviv. The channel acquired many of its debut behind-the-scenes talent from the former Al Jazeera America. The channel is carried on Drahi-owned Optimum and Charter-owned Spectrum cable systems. The channel live streams via its website.

==== NTD ====

NTD is the English language arm of New Tang Dynasty Television, a media outlet with ties to the Falun Gong, a Chinese expatriate new religious movement also responsible for The Epoch Times newspaper. Its American operations are based in New York City, with production in English, Chinese, Vietnamese, Japanese, Korean and Russian languages. In contrast to the state-backed CGTN and CNC World, NTD's editorial stance is explicitly anti-Communist, critical of the ruling clique in the People's Republic of China, and supportive of right-wing policies. It is available on select cable outlets, on free-to-air C band satellite, and through a live stream on the Internet.

== Financial news ==
TV channels	CNBC	Bloomberg TV	Fox Business Network
Headquarters	Englewood Cliffs, N.J.	New York City	New York City
Number of Households in 2012	97 million	57 million	68 million
Profits in 2008	$350 million	$15.6 million	not reported*
Management	Mark Hoffman (President)	Michael Clancy (Executive Editor)	Rupert Murdoch (CEO)

* FBN is operated as a division of Fox Corporation. No information reported for the profits or losses which the FBN division represents.

=== CNBC ===

CNBC (originally an abbreviation for the Consumer News and Business Channel) was launched by NBC in 1989 after the purchase of Satellite Program Network, and merged with competitor Financial News Network that same year. It is owned by Versant. CNBC is the widest distributed of the business channels with about 84.27% of carriage. The channel has many international spin-offs.

=== Bloomberg Television ===

CNBC gained a competitor in the financial news genre with Bloomberg Television, which was created in 1994 by Bloomberg L.P., led by former New York City Mayor Michael Bloomberg. It is distributed worldwide through cable, satellite and internet providers, and is headquartered in New York. Bloomberg Television was unusual in that its Internet stream, one of the few television networks to continuously offer a video feed over the Internet since the 1990s, was free to the public; the feed was placed behind a soft paywall along with the rest of Bloomberg's Internet ventures in May 2018.

=== Fox Business Network ===

FBN is the sister business network to Fox News Channel. In October 2007, News Corporation launched its own financial news network called Fox Business Network (FBN); News Corporation CEO Rupert Murdoch stated his reason for launching the channel was that CNBC is too "negative towards business", and had promised to make FBN more "business friendly".

=== Cheddar ===
Cheddar was established in 2017 as an initially online-only channel that operated on a freemium model with some content free and others paywalled. It was acquired by Altice USA in 2019 and, after a two-year run in which several low-powered stations owned by DTV America carried the slot, began transitioning to cable systems that year. Cheddar targets a younger audience than the other business news channels.

=== Ratings ===
FBN's ratings were initially too low to be registered beyond Nielsen's margin of error; its highest viewership was estimated to be 202,000 viewers, during the 7:00 a.m. Eastern Time hour of Imus in the Morning's debut broadcast on the network in 2009. By October 2016, FBN had surpassed CNBC, as roughly a third of CNBC's viewership migrated to FBN over the course of a year, with both netting approximately 170,000 viewers. Bloomberg also does not subscribe to Nielsen and its ratings are assumed to be very low (however, its viewership was higher than CNBC's when Bloomberg's programming was simulcast on E! in the early morning hours, an arrangement that began in 2004 after USA Network ended its simulcast of the channel after ten years, and was discontinued altogether under E! in 2007). Currently, CNBC usually has between 200,000 and 400,000 viewers during the day. In 2000, CNBC had higher ratings than CNN during market hours. The viewership of business newscasts may be underestimated in part because much of its viewership comes from communal areas, most of which cannot be accurately measured by Nielsen and are thus not counted; for this reason, CNBC dropped its subscription to Nielsen in 2015. RFD-TV's average viewership, including for its financial market coverage as well as its non-news programming, is approximately 136,000 viewers.

== Professional sports news ==
=== ESPNews ===

ESPN launched a 24-hour sports news channel named ESPNews on November 1, 1996, which is carried by most cable and satellite providers, although usually only on dedicated sports and information tiers. It airs news, highlights, press conferences and commentary by analysts all in relation to sports. ESPNews was also syndicated to regional sports networks as daytime filler programming and also often appears as blackout filler on ESPN or ESPN2 when those channels air a program unavailable in a certain geographic area.

ESPNews scaled back its news-only format in 2013, after several years of ESPN expanding its flagship newscast, SportsCenter, throughout the daytime hours on the main channel. ESPNews newscasts are now branded under the SportsCenter brand, while replays of ESPN2 talk programs typically air when SportsCenter airs on ESPN's main channel.

At least one of the ESPN networks is usually carrying a SportsCenter broadcast at any given time, with the lone exceptions being particularly busy sports days in which all three networks (ESPN, ESPN2 and ESPNEWS) are carrying sporting events and the network's multi-channel coverage of major sports events.

=== FS1 ===

Fox Entertainment Group re-branded Speed Channel as FS1, a sports channel carrying both analysis shows and live sports events, on August 13, 2013. The studio programs are usually pushed to its sister station, FS2, when live sports are occurring during the broadcast. FS2 acts primarily as an overflow network for FS1, airing their studio programs when they cannot air on FS1 due to schedule conflicts, and also airs reruns of FS1 programming. However, FS2 does air live sports as well, most often from outside the United States.

Fox Sports has, three times in its history, attempted to launch a national sportscast. The first two aired on Fox Sports Net: the National Sports Report from 1996 to 2002, and Final Score from 2006 to 2011. The third, Fox Sports Live, aired on FS1 from the network's launch until 2017.

=== CBS Sports Network / CBS Sports HQ ===

CBS Sports Network was founded as College Sports TV. It still maintains a primary focus on college sports, but has since been broadened to include general studio discussion shows, simulcasts of CBS Sports Radio talk shows, and some lower-end professional sports.

On February 26, 2018, CBS Sports launched CBS Sports HQ, an Internet-only channel that serves as a 24-hour channel for sports news, highlights and discussion programs, without any live sports.

== College sports news ==
=== ESPNU ===
ESPNU is a 24-hour sports news network dedicated to college sports. ESPN airs a customized version of SportsCenter, SportsCenter U, covering college sports, as well as documentaries about college teams and players.

=== Big Ten Network ===
The Big Ten Network, whose origins can be traced back to 2003, airs a large amount of original sports programming, including a program similar to SportsCenter called Big Ten Tonight, as well as live sports. Unlike other college sports channels, such as ESPNU or BTN's sister station Fox College Sports, BTN covers the Big Ten Conference exclusively.

=== SEC Network ===
Three years after the launch of the now-defunct Longhorn Network, ESPN entered a similard joint venture with the Southeastern Conference, also known as the SEC. While it does broadcast over 20 different SEC sports, it also airs analysis of upcoming games as well as a sports talk show. Some SEC Network football games are simulcast on WDCW.

=== ACC Network ===
The ACC Network covers every sport in the ACC as well as every team in the conference. The network features films and mini documentaries on the ACC sports teams. The ACC Network also airs games from the ACC schools.

== Weather news ==
=== The Weather Channel ===

The Weather Channel is the market leader in news regarding weather forecasting and the most widely distributed cable network in the United States. It was launched in August 1982, under the ownership of Landmark Communications (which sold the network to a joint venture of NBCUniversal, Blackstone Group and Bain Capital in 2008; these parties, in turn, split the channel, with the non-broadcast assets going to IBM in 2016 and the channel itself going to Byron Allen's Entertainment Studios in 2018).

Originally, the channel was devoted entirely to weather forecasts and news coverage (with computer-generated local forecasts inserted through each individual cable provider every ten minutes, and previously at randomized time intervals, ten times an hour), but since 2001, the network has increasingly cut back its weather coverage in favor of reality television and documentary series (this reliance on such programs has led to carriage disputes between Dish Network and DirecTV in the early 2010s, the latter resulting in the channel's first provider defection, citing subscriber complaints regarding The Weather Channel's shift away from forecast programs). The entirety of the channel's weekday morning and afternoon, and most of its weekend morning lineup remains devoted to weather news coverage and national forecasts.

Since the 2000s, there have been several other attempts to launch weather-centric television channels.

=== AccuWeather ===

==== The Local AccuWeather Channel ====
The Local AccuWeather Channel was distributed mainly as a digital subchannel on various terrestrial television outlets. Content on local versions of The Local AccuWeather Channel vary widely, ranging from a mix of local and national AccuWeather content (such as WFAA) to all-local, automated outlets (such as WFMZ-TV). Now largely deprecated, it is unknown as of January 2020 (when WFAA dropped its affiliation) whether any affiliates still carry the national AccuWeather Channel over the air. In 2021, the service was quietly discontinued in favor of AccuWeather Now, which is also provided free-to-consumer, but through advertising-supported over-the-top media service providers instead of individual terrestrial affiliates.

==== AccuWeather Network ====
AccuWeather Network is a national version of the AccuWeather channel. The network broadcasts pre-recorded national and regional weather forecasts, analysis of ongoing weather events, and weather-related news, along with local weather segments for mostly the Northeastern United States. It is currently available on providers such as Verizon FIOS and DirecTV.

=== Fox Weather ===

Fox Weather, a subsidiary of Fox Corporation, launched in late 2021 as an Internet feed, with intent to launch as a digital subchannel on Fox owned-and-operated stations in early 2022.

=== WeatherNation TV ===
WeatherNation TV, originally known as The Weather Cast, also uses this model (having taken the place of The Local AccuWeather Channel as the affiliation of certain stations' weather channels since 2013), although it also provides a feed directly to cable providers and directly to consumers through mobile and smart-TV apps. A national feed is available on Dish Network.

== Criticism and analysis ==
Media analysts have reported that cable news programs in the United States have increasingly eliminated genuine disagreements between hosts and guests. A 2025 study found that the amount of “real debate” on prime-time programs declined by about one-third between 2017 and 2024, with discussion formats increasingly favoring preexisting viewpoints.

== See also ==
- Big Three television networks
- Cable television in the United States
- Communications in the United States
- Fourth television network
- High-definition television in the United States
- International broadcasting
- List of television stations in the United States
- List of United States cable and satellite television networks
- List of United States over-the-air television networks
- List of United States television markets
- Satellite television in the United States
- Television in the United States
- Television news in the United States
- Category:24-hour television news channels in the United States
