= Tribune Media =

American media conglomerate (1861–2019)

Tribune Media Company
- Formerly: Tribune Company (1861–2014)
- Type: Public
- Traded as: NYSE: TRCO (Class A) (2014-2019); NYSE: TRB (1983-2007); S&P 500 component (until 2007)
- ISIN: US8960475031
- Industry: Mass media
- Founded: June 10, 1847; 179 years ago (as Chicago Daily Tribune); 1861; 165 years ago (as Tribune Company)
- Defunct: September 19, 2019; 7 years ago
- Fate: Newspapers spun off in 2014 to Tribune Publishing. Broadcast assets merged into Nexstar, name used by Nexstar for station licensing.
- Successor: Tribune Publishing (newspapers); Nexstar Media Group (broadcasting)
- Headquarters: Chicago, Illinois, U.S.
- Key people: Bruce Karsh (chairman); Peter Kern (Interim CEO)
- Products: Television, radio, television production, real estate, publishing
- Revenue: ▲US$1.94 billion (2016)
- Operating income: ▲US$433.6 million (2016)
- Net income: ▲US$380.9 million (2016)
- Total assets: ▲US$9.7 million (2016)
- Total equity: ▲US$27 million (2016)
- Number of employees: 8,200 (2016)
- Subsidiaries: Tribune Broadcasting; Tribune Publishing
- Website: www.tribunemedia.com (shutdown)

Tribune Media Company, formerly known as the Tribune Company, was an American multimedia conglomerate headquartered in Chicago, Illinois.

Through Tribune Broadcasting, Tribune Media was one of the largest television broadcasting companies, owning 39 television stations across the United States and operating three additional stations through local marketing agreements. It owned national basic cable channel/superstation WGN America, regional cable news channel Chicagoland Television (CLTV) and Chicago radio station WGN. Investment interests include the Food Network, in which the company had a 31% share.

Prior to the August 2014 spin-off of the company's publishing division into Tribune Publishing, Tribune Media was the nation's second-largest newspaper publisher behind the Gannett Company, with ten daily newspapers, including the Chicago Tribune, Los Angeles Times, Orlando Sentinel, Sun-Sentinel and The Baltimore Sun, and several commuter tabloids.

In 2007, investors bought the company, taking on substantial debt. The subsequent 2008 bankruptcy of the Tribune Company was the largest bankruptcy in the history of the American media industry. In December 2012 the Tribune Co. emerged from bankruptcy. Tribune announced its sale to Hunt Valley, Maryland-based Sinclair Broadcast Group on May 8, 2017, but on August 9, 2018, Tribune cancelled the sale and sued Sinclair for breach of contract. On December 3, 2018, Nexstar Media Group announced that it would merge with Tribune Media for $4.1 billion. Within Nexstar, Tribune Media remains the license holder for all of the former Tribune stations retained directly by Nexstar after the Nexstar acquisition. The largest broadcast merger in U.S. history was approved in 2019.

== History ==
=== Print pioneer ===
The Tribune Company was founded on June 10, 1847 when the eponymous Chicago Daily Tribune published its first edition in a one-room plant located at LaSalle and Lake Streets in downtown Chicago. The original press run consisted of 400 copies printed on a hand press. The Tribune constructed its first building, a four-story structure at Dearborn and Madison Streets, in 1869. The building was destroyed in the Great Chicago Fire of October 1871, along with most of the city. The Tribune resumed printing two days later with an editorial declaring "Chicago Shall Rise Again." Joseph Medill, a native Ohioan who acquired an interest in the Tribune in 1855, gained full control of the newspaper in 1874 and ran it until his death in 1899.

Medill's two grandsons, cousins Robert R. McCormick and Joseph Medill Patterson, assumed leadership in 1911. That same year, the Chicago Tribune's first newsprint mill opened in Thorold, Ontario, Canada. The mill marked the beginnings of the Canadian newsprint producer later known as QUNO, in which Tribune held an investment interest until 1995.

Patterson established the company's second newspaper, the New York News in 1919. Tribune's ownership of the New York City tabloid was considered "interlocking" due to an agreement between McCormick and Patterson.

The paper launched a European edition during World War I. To compete with the Saturday Evening Post and Collier's in 1924, the Tribune Company launched a weekly national magazine, Liberty, run by a subsidiary, McCormick-Patterson.

=== Move into broadcasting ===
The company entered broadcasting in 1924 by leasing WDAP, one of Chicago's first radio stations. Tribune later changed the station's call letters to WGN, reflecting the Tribune's nickname, "World's Greatest Newspaper." WGN was purchased by the company in 1926 and went on to become prominent in the radio industry.

In 1925, the company completed its new headquarters, the Tribune Tower. That same year, the company decided to fund the future Joseph Medill School of Journalism at Northwestern University.

Liberty magazine eventually exceeded Collier's circulation, but lacked sufficient advertising and was sold in 1931. The Tribune's European edition was also cut. However, Tribune launched the Chicago Tribune-New York News Syndicate content syndication service in 1933.

With the death of Joe Patterson's sister and owner of the Washington Times-Herald, Eleanor (Cissy) Patterson, in 1948, the Tribune Company purchased the paper and operated it until 1954, when the Times-Herald was absorbed by The Washington Post. Expecting a printer's strike in November 1948, the Tribune printed their paper early, mistakenly proclaiming "Dewey Defeats Truman" in the 1948 presidential election. Tribune entered the television industry then in its infancy, in 1948, with the establishment of WGN-TV in Chicago in April and WPIX in New York City in June of that year. In 1956, the Tribune Company purchased the Chicago American from William Randolph Hearst.

In the 1960s, the company entered the booming Florida market, acquiring the Fort Lauderdale-based Gore Newspapers Company, owner of the Pompano-based Sun-Sentinel and Fort Lauderdale News in 1963 and the Sentinel-Star Company, owners of the Orlando Sentinel, in 1965. Also in 1963, the company purchased part of the defunct New York Mirror. The company increased its broadcast holdings with the acquisition of radio station WQCD-FM in New York City in 1964 and independent television station KWGN-TV in Denver in 1965. In 1967, the company began printing a tabloid serving suburban areas of Chicago, The Suburban Trib.

The corporation was reorganized in 1968 by reincorporating under Delaware's General Corporation Law, ending its Illinois incorporation, splitting its stock by four for one and forming a separate subsidiary of the Chicago Tribune.

The 1970s brought another decade of acquisitions for the company including the purchase of a Los Angeles shopper in 1973, which became the Los Angeles Daily News. In 1973, the company began sharing stories among 25 subscribers via the newly formed news service, the Knight News Wire. By 1990, this service was known as KRT (Knight-Ridder/Tribune) and provided graphics, photo and news content to its member newspapers. When The McClatchy Company purchased Knight-Ridder Inc. in 2006, KRT became MCT (McClatchy-Tribune Information Services), which was jointly owned by the Tribune Company and McClatchy.

The company stopped publishing the tabloid Chicago Today in 1974; the Tribune also began publishing all-day editions. An approval of changes to the Tribune bylaws in 1974 triggered a lawsuit by shareholders who saw this as a move towards taking the company public. The lawsuit by Josephine Albright – Joseph Patterson's daughter – and her son, Joseph Albright, was dismissed in 1979.

The Tribune Company entered first-run television syndication in 1975 with the debut of the U.S. Farm Report. The Times-Advocate in Escondido, California was purchased by the company in 1977. In October 1978, United Video Satellite Group uplinked WGN-TV's signal to satellite, becoming a national "superstation", joining the ranks of WTCG (later WTBS, now WPCH-TV) in Atlanta and WWOR-TV in New York City. During 1978, the New York Daily News saw multiple employee strikes.

In 1980, the Daily News added an afternoon edition to go head-to-head with the New York Post; this expansion failed, with the newspaper reverting to once-daily editions with the end of the afternoon edition in 1981. Also that year, the Independent Network News, an evening newscast intended for independent stations, was launched as the company's second syndicated television program, originating from WPIX. The New York Daily News was put up for sale in 1981, but a proposed deal fell through by 1982. In August of that year, Tribune purchased the Chicago Cubs Major League Baseball team from William Wrigley III.

In 1981, all of Tribune's television stations, which were previously under the WGN Continental Broadcasting unit, were placed under the company's subsidiary Tribune Broadcasting Company. The following year, Tribune formed the Tribune Entertainment Company as a production subsidiary to produce the company's existing syndicated programs including the U.S. Farm Report, as well as newer shows.

=== Public corporation ===
In 1983, The Suburban Trib was replaced by zone editions of the Chicago Tribune. That October, the Tribune Company became a public firm, with the sale of 7.7 million shares at $26.75 a share. In 1985, Tribune Broadcasting acquired Los Angeles independent station KTLA from Kohlberg Kravis Roberts for a record $510 million. Because of the Federal Communications Commission's media cross-ownership regulations, which prohibit the ownership of a television station and newspaper in the same market, Tribune was forced to sell the Los Angeles Daily News. With the purchase of KTLA, Tribune became the fourth largest television station owner in the United States, behind the three major broadcast networks. The company acquired Newport News, Virginia newspaper, the Daily Press in 1986, but sold off the newspaper's co-owned cable television operations.

To counteract a possible hostile corporate takeover in 1987, the Tribune Company developed a plan that allowed shareholders the right to purchase additional preferred shares from a new series of stock in the event that a buyer acquired 10% of the company's common stock or a tender offer for the company. Shareholders also ratified a two-for-one stock split. Tribune Entertainment experienced success in 1987 with the launch of the syndicated daytime talk show Geraldo. In 1988, Tribune purchased five weekly papers based in Santa Clara County, California. In the wake of a dispute with some of its labor unions, Tribune sold the Daily News to British businessman Robert Maxwell in 1991.

With changes in the media industry due to greater public access to the internet in the 1990s, Tribune Publishing began to sell off some of its newspaper properties. Tribune Broadcasting steadily acquired additional stations during the decade, while Tribune itself launched two new divisions, Tribune Ventures and Tribune Education. In 1993, Tribune Broadcasting launched Chicagoland Television (CLTV), a 24-hour local cable news channel for the Chicago area.

Online editions of Tribune's newspapers were developed starting in 1995, with the Chicago Tribune's digital edition launching in 1996. Also in 1996, Tribune (holding a 20% interest) created a joint venture with American Online (which held an 80% interest) called Digital City, Inc. to set up a series of Digital City websites to provide interactive local news and information services. By 1997, Tribune Publishing had only four daily newspapers remaining in its portfolio: the Chicago Tribune, the Fort Lauderdale Sun-Sentinel, the Orlando Sentinel and the Daily Press. Tribune also set up its Tribune Ventures division to acquire stakes in newer media businesses. During the middle of that year, Tribune Ventures purchased interests in companies such as AOL (owning 4%), electronic payment specialist CheckFree Corporation (owning 5%), search engine company Excite, Inc. (owning 7%), Mercury Mail, Inc. (owning 13%), Open Market, Inc. (owning 6%), and Peapod LP (owning 13%). Also that year, the Orlando Sentinel and Time Warner Cable joined to create the Orlando-based local cable news channel, Central Florida News 13. Tribune also purchased a 31% stake in the Food Network.

The company began the 1990s with six television stations, but changes to federal radio and television ownership regulations allowed Tribune to expand its television station holdings over the next decade. Tribune Broadcasting purchased ten additional stations by 1997, six of them acquired through that year's purchase of Renaissance Broadcasting for $1.1 billion in cash. Tribune purchased a 12.5% stake in The WB Television Network in August 1995; the company had ten of its 16 stations affiliated with the network (including five that were signed as charter affiliates through The WB's initial 1993 affiliation deal with Tribune). Tribune invested $21 million in The WB in March 1997, which increased its equity interest in the network to 21.9%.

In November 1994, Tribune Broadcasting formed a partnership with several minority partners, including Quincy Jones, to form Qwest Broadcasting. Qwest operated as a separate company from Tribune (which owned stations in a few markets where Tribune had already owned stations, including WATL in Atlanta, which was operated alongside Tribune-owned WGNX);

Tribune entered into a new business sector when it formed Tribune Education in 1993. The sector grew and provided high profit margins. Through 1996, Tribune used $400 million to purchase several publishers of education material: Contemporary Books, Inc., The Wright Group, Everyday Learning Corporation, Jamestown Publishers, Inc., Educational Publishing Corporation, NTC Publishing Group and Janson Publications. In 1996, this group was the number one publisher of supplemental education materials. Tribune Education acquired an 80.5% stake in mass market children's book publisher Landoll in 1997.

In June 1998, Tribune entered into a trade with Emmis Communications to swap WQCD-FM to the latter company, in exchange for acquiring two Emmis-owned television stations (WXMI in Grand Rapids, Michigan and KTZZ in Seattle, Washington). It later traded WGNX in Atlanta to the Meredith Corporation in exchange for KCPQ-TV in Seattle in March 1999. Later that year, the station purchased WEWB in Albany, New York and WBDC in Washington, D.C. Tribune Interactive, Inc. was incorporated to handle all the various websites for its publishing, television and radio, and newspaper properties. During the 1999 fiscal year, Tribune racked up $1.47 billion in profits on total revenues of $2.92 billion, in part from gains made on the sale of some of its internet investments. In February 2000, Tribune acquired the remaining 67% interest in Qwest Broadcasting for $107 million, effectively adding two more stations to its roster, increasing its reach 27% of the country.

In June 2000, Tribune acquired the Los Angeles–based Times Mirror Company in a US$8.3 billion merger transaction, the largest acquisition in the history of the newspaper industry, effectively doubling the size of Tribune's newspaper holdings. The Times Mirror merger added seven daily newspapers to Tribune's existing publishing properties, including the Los Angeles Times, the Long Island-based Newsday, The Baltimore Sun and the Hartford Courant. Through the deal, Tribune became the only media company that owned both newspapers and television stations in the three largest media markets of New York City, Los Angeles and Chicago, as a result of cross-ownership waivers that were approved by the FCC.

Among other advantages from the merger, including various economies of scale, Tribune's newspapers could now effectively compete for national advertising, as it has grown to become the third largest newspaper group in the country. Tribune Media Net, the national advertising sales organization of Tribune Publishing, was established in 2000 to take advantage of the company's expanded scale and scope. By 2001, revenues had grown to $5.25 billion. However, Tribune needed to pay down some of the debt that it accrued through the Times Mirror purchase; as a result, Tribune moved to sell various non-newspaper holdings operated by Times Mirror. Flight information provider Jeppesen Sanderson was sold to Boeing for $1.5 billion in October 2000. Also in October, the Institute for International Research purchased AchieveGlobal, a consulting and training firm for $100 million. Times Mirror Magazines was sold to Time, Inc. in November of that year for $475 million. Tribune divested its Tribune Education division to The McGraw-Hill Companies for $686 million in September 2000. After all these sales, Tribune still had $4 billion in long-term debt. Tribune started a joint venture with Knight-Ridder, CareerBuilder, that same year.

After the 2001 September 11 attacks, the media sector suffered a greater decrease in advertising revenue. This forced a 10% reduction in staff companywide and a $151.9 million restructuring charge.

In 2002 and 2003, Tribune Broadcasting bought four additional television stations, increasing its total television holdings to 26 stations, some of which were acquired via trades of the company's radio stations; this left its one-time radio flagship WGN (AM) in Chicago as the company's sole remaining radio station. Tribune Publishing purchased the monthly lifestyle publication Chicago from Primedia (now Rent Group) in August 2002. Hoy, a Spanish language newspaper owned by the company, expanded with the launch of local editions in Chicago (in September 2003) and Los Angeles (in March 2004).

Tribune also launched daily newspapers targeting younger urban commuters, including the Chicago Tribune's RedEye edition in 2003, followed by an investment in AM New York. That same year, Tribune pushed for the FCC to loosen its regulations barring cross-ownership of newspapers and broadcast outlets (television and/or radio) in a single market. Tribune would have to sell either a newspaper or television station in Los Angeles, New York City and Hartford while its combination of the Sun-Sentinel and WBZL-TV in Miami/Fort Lauderdale, Florida was given a temporary waiver. The FCC granted waivers for the other newspaper-television combinations in June 2003.

In 2006, Tribune acquired the minority equity interest in AM New York, giving it full ownership of the newspaper. The company sold both Newsday and AM New York to Cablevision Systems Corporation in 2008.

Tribune's partnership in The WB ended in 2006, when the network was shut down – along with CBS Corporation-owned UPN – to create The CW Television Network, which was a joint venture between CBS and Warner Bros. and affiliated with several Tribune-owned stations; Tribune did not maintain an ownership interest in the network.

=== Zell ownership ===
On April 2, 2007, Chicago-based investor Sam Zell announced plans to buy out the Tribune Company for $34.00 a share, totalling $8.2 billion, with the intent to take the company private. The deal was approved by 97% of the company's shareholders on August 21, 2007. Privatization of the Tribune Company occurred on December 20, 2007 with termination of trading in Tribune stock at the close of the trading day.

On December 21, 2007, Tribune and Oak Hill Capital Partners-controlled Local TV, LLC announced plans to collaborate in the formation of a "broadcast management company" (later named The Other Company). On January 31, 2008, Tribune Company announced it would purchase real estate leased from TMCT, LLC, which included properties used by the Los Angeles Times, Newsday, Baltimore Sun and Hartford Courant. The company received an option to purchase the real estate for $175 million through the 2006 restructuring of TMCT, LLC.

In addition, Tribune announced the sale of Tribune Studios and related real estate in Los Angeles to private equity firm Hudson Capital, LLC, for $125 million. The parties also agreed to a five-year lease allowing its television station in the city, KTLA, to continue operating at the location through 2012.

On April 28, 2008, Tribune completed an acquisition of real estate from TMCT Partnership. On July 29, 2008, Cablevision Systems Corporation completed its purchase of Newsday from Tribune.

On September 8, 2008, United Airlines lost (and almost regained) $1 billion in market value when an archived Chicago Tribune article from 2002 about United filing for bankruptcy appeared in the "most viewed" category on the South Florida Sun-Sentinel's website. Google News index's next pass found the link as new news. Income Security Advisors found the Google result to be new news, which was passed along to Bloomberg News where it became a headline (Tribune, which owns both papers, noted that one click on a story in non-peak hours could flag an article as "most viewed").

=== Bankruptcy reorganization ===
On December 8, 2008, faced with a high debt load related to the company's privatization and a sharp downturn in newspaper advertising revenue, Tribune filed for Chapter 11 bankruptcy protection. Company plans originally called for it to emerge from bankruptcy by May 31, 2010, but the company would end up in protracted bankruptcy proceedings for another four years. With the company's overall debt totaling $13 billion, it was the largest bankruptcy in the history of the American media industry.

On October 27, 2009, Thomas S. Ricketts purchased a majority ownership (95%) of the Chicago Cubs. The sale also included Wrigley Field and a 25% ownership stake in Comcast SportsNet Chicago, as part of a deal designed to help Tribune restructure. In October 2010, Randy Michaels, who was appointed CEO after Zell's purchase of the company, was removed and replaced by an executive council. The New York Times had reported earlier in the month about his "outlandish, often sexual behavior" that he also exercised in his previous job at Clear Channel Communications.

=== Public corporation second time ===
On July 13, 2012, the Tribune Company received approval of a reorganization plan to allow the company to emerge from Chapter 11 bankruptcy protection in a Delaware bankruptcy court. Oaktree Capital Management, JPMorgan Chase and Angelo, Gordon & Co., which were the company's senior debt holders, assumed control of Tribune's properties upon the company's exit from bankruptcy on December 31, 2012. Coincident with emergence from bankruptcy, company stock began trading as an over-the-counter security under the symbol TRBAA. In December 2014, over-the-counter trading ended and the company's stock began trading on the New York Stock Exchange under the symbol TRCO.

On February 26, 2013, it was reported that Tribune hired investment firms Evercore Partners and J.P. Morgan to oversee the sale of its newspapers. On July 1, 2013, Tribune announced that it would purchase the 19 television stations owned by Local TV, LLC outright for $2.75 billion. The FCC approved the acquisition on December 20, and the sale was completed one week later on December 27.

Tribune later announced its return to television production on March 19, 2013, with the relaunch of the production and distribution division as Tribune Studios (not to be confused with the former name of Los Angeles studio facility Sunset Bronson Studios).

=== Split and subsequent transactions ===
On July 10, 2013, Tribune announced that it would split into two companies, spinning off the newspapers that were part of its publishing division into a separate company. Its broadcasting, digital media and other assets (including Tribune Media Services, which among others, provides news and features content for Tribune's newspapers) would remain with the Tribune Company. The split came in the footsteps of similar spin-outs by News Corporation and Time Warner, which sought to improve the profitability of their properties by separating them from the struggling print industry. On November 20, 2013, Tribune announced it would cut 700 jobs in its newspaper operations, citing falling advertising revenue.

The split was finalized on August 4, 2014, with the publishing arm being spun out as Tribune Publishing, and the remainder of the company renamed Tribune Media.

==== Aborted acquisition by Sinclair Broadcast Group ====
On February 29, 2016, Tribune Media announced that it would review various "strategic alternatives" to increase the company's value to shareholders, which include a possible sale of the entire company and/or select assets, or the formation of programming alliances or strategic partnerships with other companies, due to the decrease in its stock price since the Tribune Publishing spin-off and a $385 million revenue write-down for the 2015 fiscal year, partly due to original scripted programming expenditures for WGN America since it converted the cable network from a superstation in 2014. In 2016, Tribune Media sold off real estate properties to net $409 million while authorizing $400 million in share repurchasing. In December 2016, Tribune Media sold Gracenote to Nielsen Holdings for $560 million; Tribune planned to use the sale to pay down a debt of $3.5 billion. Cash on hand was expected to pay out $500 million in dividends in the first quarter of 2017. In January 2017, Tribune Media announced that Peter Liguori would step down as President and CEO in March.

On April 20, 2017, Bloomberg reported that Sinclair Broadcast Group was considering acquiring Tribune Media, contingent on plans by the FCC's new chairman, Ajit Pai, to reinstate the "UHF discount" (a policy which makes UHF stations only count half of their total audience towards the FCC's 39% market share cap), which had been removed by Tom Wheeler during the final months of the Obama administration. The stocks of both companies rose in value in the wake of these rumors. As was expected, the FCC reinstated the UHF discount; under adjusted calculations, the two companies only had a combined market share of 42%, meaning that the combined company would be required to divest stations in order to stay below the cap. However, there was only an 11% market overlap between Tribune and Sinclair's stations.

On April 30, 2017, The Wall Street Journal reported that there were competing bids for Tribune from a partnership between 21st Century Fox and private equity firm Blackstone Group (under which Fox would contribute its existing station group into a joint venture with Blackstone), and Nexstar Media Group. The Fox/Blackstone deal was being proposed as a defensive measure, due to concerns by 21st Century Fox over the number of Fox-affiliated stations Sinclair would control if it acquired Tribune Media. However, The New York Times reported that Fox had not actually made a formal bid for Tribune Media.

On May 8, 2017, Sinclair Broadcast Group officially announced its intent to acquire Tribune Media in a cash-and-stock deal valuing the company at $3.9 billion, plus the assumption of $2.7 billion in debt held by Tribune.

The proposed sale resulted in concerns from various groups over the effects of the UHF discount on U.S. media; the Institute for Public Representation coalition filed a request for an emergency motion to stay the reinstatement of the UHF discount order pending a court challenge, echoing Wheeler's opinion that it was outdated and intended to trigger media consolidation. On June 1, 2017, a federal appeals court issued a temporary administrative stay whilst evaluating the request, and rejected it on June 15.

On July 13, 2017, a Tribune Media shareholder, identified as Sean McEntire, filed a class-action lawsuit, seeking to halt Tribune's sale to Sinclair, while former U.S. Securities and Exchange Commission (SEC) attorney Willie Briscoe has begun investigating Tribune's sale to Sinclair. On that same date, another Tribune Media shareholder, identified in legal paperwork as Robert Berg, also filed a class-action lawsuit. The lawsuit accuses Sinclair and Tribune of withholding the details of the two companies' financial projections and the processes used in valuation analyses performed by their financial advisors. Additionally, the registration statement allegedly omits information about potential conflicts of interest concerning Tribune's board of directors and one of its financial advisors. Berg further claims that stockholders are entitled to "an accurate description" of the background of the deal, including processes used by the board to arrive at their decision to recommend the merger. Without this information, Berg argues, stockholders cannot determine whether they support the deal. On July 18, 2017, a third Tribune Media shareholder, identified in legal paperwork as David Pill, also filed a class-action lawsuit which seeks to halt Sinclair's acquisition of Tribune. On July 27, 2017, the law firm of Faruqi & Faruqi, LLP, filed a class-action lawsuit on behalf of Tribune Media shareholders who have been harmed by Tribune's and its board of directors' alleged violations of Sections 14(a) and 20(a) of the Securities Exchange Act of 1934 in connection with the proposed merger of the Company with Sinclair Broadcast Group, Inc.

On October 19, 2017, the sale was approved by Tribune Media shareholders.

On July 16, 2018, FCC chairman Ajit Pai was reported to have "serious concerns" about the merger and proposed a hearing before an administrative law judge.

On August 9, 2018, Tribune decided to back out on the merger, and decided to sue Sinclair, alleging breach of contract.

==== Acquisition by Nexstar Media Group ====
In November 2018, sale rumors intensified again, with Byron Allen (founder of Entertainment Studios), Ion Media (in partnership with Cerberus Capital Management and Hicks Equity Partners) having reported interest and Nexstar Media Group reported as being a leading bidder.

On December 3, 2018, Nexstar Media Group announced its intent to merge with Tribune Media for $6.4 billion and it will still be known as "Nexstar Media Group". The sale would give the company 216 stations in 118 markets, placing it just below the FCC's market cap of 39% of TV households. The sale price reflects a 45% increase in valuation over Sinclair's offer. Nexstar plans to divest some stations and "non-core" assets as part of the acquisition.

On January 21, 2019, it was reported that Nexstar Media Group has agreed to merge with Tribune Media for about $4.1 billion in cash, making it the largest regional U.S. TV station operator and will take the Nexstar name.

On August 1 of that year, the United States Department of Justice approved the deal.

The sale was approved by the FCC on September 16, and completed on September 19.

== Assets ==
- Tribune Broadcasting, broadcast media holdings
  - Antenna TV
  - This TV
  - Tribune Studios
  - WGN America
  - Chicagoland Television, regional cable news channel
- Tribune (FN) Cable Ventures Inc.
  - Television Food Network, G.P. (31%, with Discovery, Inc.)
    - Food Network
    - Cooking Channel
- Tribune Publishing, print media holdings
  - Zap2it
  - TV by the Numbers
  - CareerBuilder, an online employment website with The McClatchy Company and Gannett Company
  - Metromix, an entertainment website with Gannett Company
  - Topix
  - Tribune News Service, a publication put out by Tribune Content Agency
- The WB, a former television network in joint venture with Warner Bros.
