= Orion Samuelson =

American agricultural broadcast journalist (1934–2026)

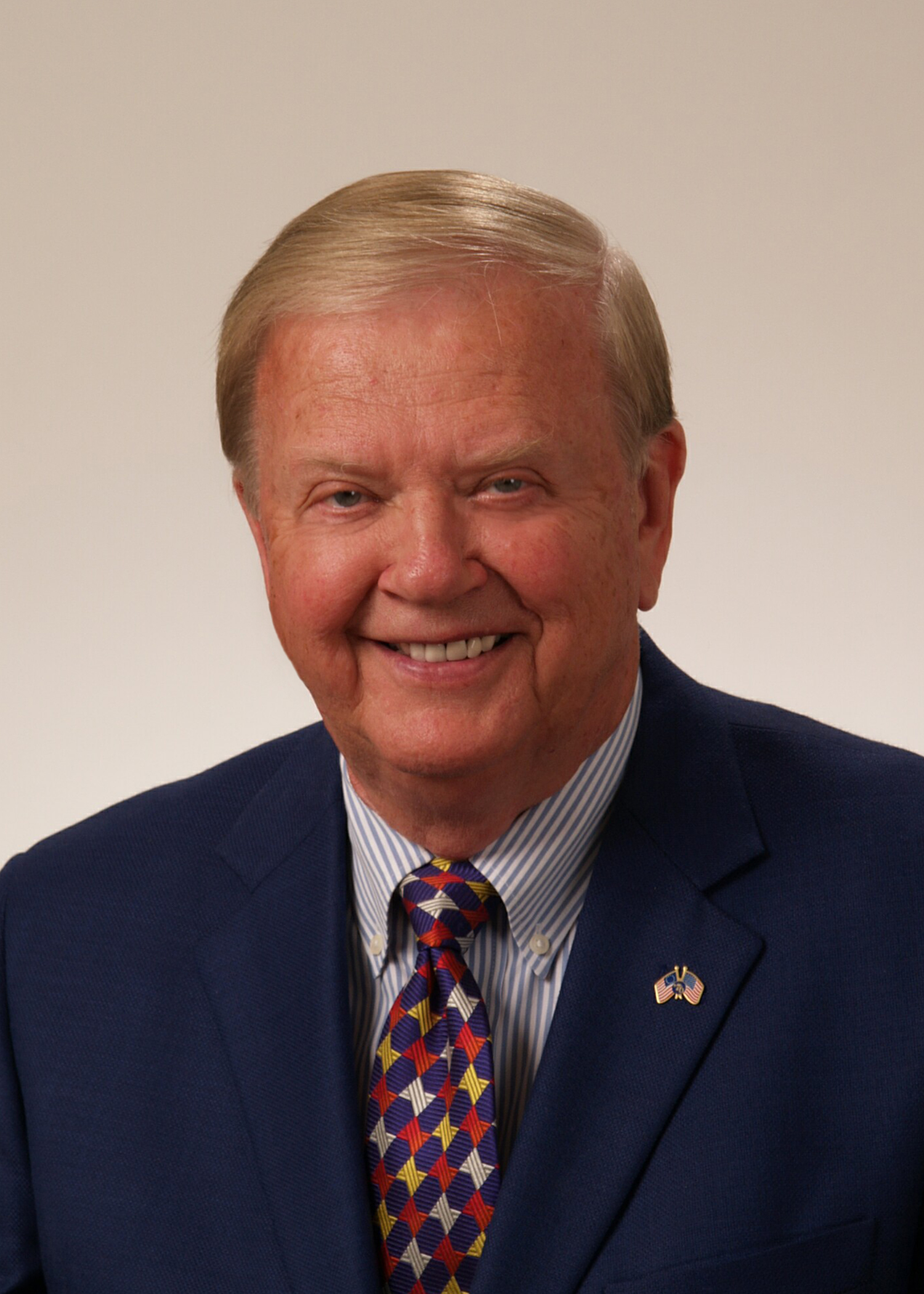
- Samuelson in 2008
- Born: March 31, 1934; Wisconsin, U.S.
- Died: March 16, 2026 (aged 91); Huntley, Illinois, U.S.
- Occupation: Radio journalist
- Years active: 1960–2020
- Notable credits: National Barn Dance; U.S. Farm Report
- Political party: Republican

Orion Clifford Samuelson (/ˈɔːriən/ OR-ee-ən; March 31, 1934 – March 16, 2026) was an American broadcaster known for his agriculture broadcasts and his ability to explain agribusiness and food production in an understandable way. He was inducted into the Radio Hall of Fame in 2003.

== Early life and career ==
Samuelson was born on a dairy farm near Ontario, Wisconsin, on March 31, 1934. Growing up on the farm Samuelson was expected to take over the family business, but a leg disease (Legg–Calvé–Perthes disease) made it impossible to do heavy work and left him unable to walk for a substantial part of his adolescence. He considered becoming a Lutheran pastor before deciding on six months of radio school at the American Institute of the Air in Minneapolis. His early work was based in Wisconsin, at WKLJ in Sparta (as a polka disc jockey), WHBY in Appleton, and WBAY-TV/AM in Green Bay where he was its farm director.

He began at Chicago's WGN radio in a similar capacity on 26 September 1960 and was heard for sixty years as the station's head agriculture broadcaster through 2020, getting the job after his predecessor Norm Kraft abruptly resigned from his position on-air. In May 1960, one of Samuelson's first assignments for WGN was to emcee the National Barn Dance, a long running program that WGN had just acquired when WLS radio discontinued its association with the Prairie Farmer magazine. WLS had converted to "The Station With Personality" and started playing rock 'n' roll. Three years into his tenure at WGN, Samuelson was the staffer who read the news of the John F. Kennedy assassination. His career led him to have dinner at the White House and travel to 43 countries, including Cuba, where he shook hands with Fidel Castro, Moscow where he met with Mikhail Gorbachev, and England to broadcast live from the Royal Agricultural Show. He traveled with the Secretary of Agriculture and the Prime Minister of India to see the Taj Mahal. He interviewed and/or met every U.S. president from Dwight D. Eisenhower to Donald Trump, including John F. Kennedy (when he was still a Senator), Lyndon Johnson, Richard Nixon, Gerald Ford, Ronald Reagan, George H. W. Bush, George W. Bush, and Bill Clinton, and additionally, after he was 20 years out of the Oval Office, Harry S. Truman. He considered Reagan his favorite President overall due to their mutual oratory skills, and Truman his favorite Democratic president for the leadership he showed in the years following World War II.

During the 1960s, Samuelson hosted an early-morning show on WGN-TV, Top 'O' the Morning, first with organist Harold Turner, then with Max Armstrong. From 1975 to 2005, Samuelson was the host of U.S. Farm Report, a weekly television newsmagazine dedicated to agriculture. U.S. Farm Report continued without Samuelson after his departure. Samuelson hosted a similar show, This Week in Agribusiness, along with his longtime collaborator Max Armstrong, until his retirement, and continued to make occasional commentaries on that show with Armstrong as host. Both shows aired on 190 Midwest stations via first-run syndication. He also served as the on-site host for RFD-TV's coverage of the Rose Parade.

Politically, Samuelson was a Republican; he supported the production of ethanol fuel from corn, to help American farmers. In 2004, Dennis Hastert approached Samuelson about running for office against Barack Obama in the 2004 United States Senate election in Illinois; Samuelson, though he was eager to enter the race, was forced to decline due a throat infection that doctors and his wife warned would be fatal if he attempted the campaign.

On the lighter side, Samuelson and a studio group dubbed the "Uff da Band" once recorded covers of Yogi Yorgesson's novelty songs "I Yust Go Nuts at Christmas" and "Yingle Bells". Samuelson held the same position in the broadcasting industry for 60 consecutive years through 2020, second only to Los Angeles Dodgers Radio Network announcer Vin Scully.

In 2001, Samuelson was named a laureate of The Lincoln Academy of Illinois and was awarded the Order of Lincoln – the highest award bestowed by the State of Illinois. The University of Illinois presented Samuelson with the honorary degree of Doctor of Letters. He was honored at the 2010 Wisconsin Corn/Soy Expo in Wisconsin Dells. Samuelson received a custom-engraved Norwegian horse plaque to commemorate the occasion from presidents of the Wisconsin Corn Growers Association, the Wisconsin Soybean Association, the Wisconsin Agri-Services Association, and the Wisconsin Pork Association. On December 9, 2010, the southwest corner of E. Illinois St. & N. Cityfront Plaza Dr. was named Orion Samuelson Way by the city of Chicago. In 2014, he was awarded the VERITAS award by American Agri-Women (AAW).

Samuelson served as a Board Member Emeritus for the Illinois Agricultural Leadership Foundation (IALF) having previously served as chairman of the board. He also served on the Farm Foundation Bennett Round Table, and was a member of the board of the Agriculture Future of America, the board of Farm Safety 4 Just Kids, and the board of directors of the Foods Resource Bank, and was a trustee of the Cornerstone Foundation of Lutheran Social Services of Illinois, and a member of the board of trustees of the National 4-H Council.

On November 1, 2012, Samuelson published his autobiography You Can't Dream Big Enough via Bantry Bay Media.

In 2014, the CME Group and the National Association of Farm Broadcasting (NAFB) Foundation announced the inaugural recipient of the Orion Samuelson Scholarship ($5,000) for a senior at the University of Illinois, Urbana-Champaign. The scholarship is presented to a college student seeking a career in agricultural communications.

On September 23, 2020, Samuelson announced his retirement from WGN Radio. His final broadcast on WGN was the noon business report on December 31, 2020. He was succeeded at WGN by Steve Alexander and on This Week in Agribusiness by Mike Pearson.

== Death ==
Samuelson died at his home in Huntley, Illinois, on March 16, 2026, at the age of 91.

== Awards ==
- National Radio Hall of Fame, 2003
- American Farm Bureau's Distinguished Service Award, 1998
- National Association of Farm Broadcasting Hall of Fame, 1999
- 4-H Alumni Award
- Oscar
- Norsk Høstfest Scandinavian-American Hall of Fame
- Orion Samuelson was inducted as a Laureate of The Lincoln Academy of Illinois and awarded the Order of Lincoln (the State's highest honor) by the governor of Illinois in 2001 in the area of Communication and Agriculture.
- American Agri-Women Veritas Award, 2014

== Listen to ==
- Christmas Eve air check from Radio Hall of Fame
