= Loka Ashwood =

American sociologist

- Awards: MacArthur Fellow (2024)

Academic background
- Education: Northwestern University; University of Galway; University of Wisconsin-Madison

Academic work
- Discipline: Sociologist
- Sub-discipline: Rural communities
- Institutions: Auburn University; University of Kentucky
- Website: lokaashwood.com

Loka Ashwood (born 1984 or 1985) is an American sociologist working at the University of Wisconsin-Madison as a professor of community and environmental sociology. Her research focuses on rural communities and their issues. She is a 2024 MacArthur Fellow.

Her first book, For-Profit Democracy, investigated the relationship between rural American communities and the U.S. government through the lens of Burke County, Georgia and the construction of a nuclear power plant there.

Ashwood co-wrote the 2023 book Empty Fields, Empty Promises, which explored right-to-farm laws across the United States. She has criticized right-to-farm laws, saying they have been used by agricultural corporations to limit the efficacy of pollution-focused lawsuits.

== Life ==
Ashwood was raised in a farming family in Illinois.

She graduated in 2007 from Northwestern University with a BS. She interned as a reporter for U.S. Farm Report for a few years while at Northwestern. She graduated in 2009 from University of Galway with an ML. She did community development work at the Illinois Institute for Rural Affairs. She earned her PhD in 2015 from the University of Wisconsin, Madison.

Ashwood worked as an assistant professor at Auburn University from 2015 to 2020. In 2020 she was hired by the University of Kentucky.

== Publications ==
=== Books ===
- For-Profit Democracy: Why the Government Is Losing the Trust of Rural America (2018)
- Empty Fields, Empty Promises: A State-by-State Guide to Understanding and Transforming the Right to Farm (2023); co-written with Aimee Imlay, Lindsay Kuehn, Allen Franco, and Danielle Diamond
