= Ag Day =

Ag Day may refer to:

- Ag Day (Kansas State University)
- Ag Day (University of Maryland)
- AgDay, a US television program focusing on agriculture
