= Mitzi Perdue =

American author, philanthropist, and advocate

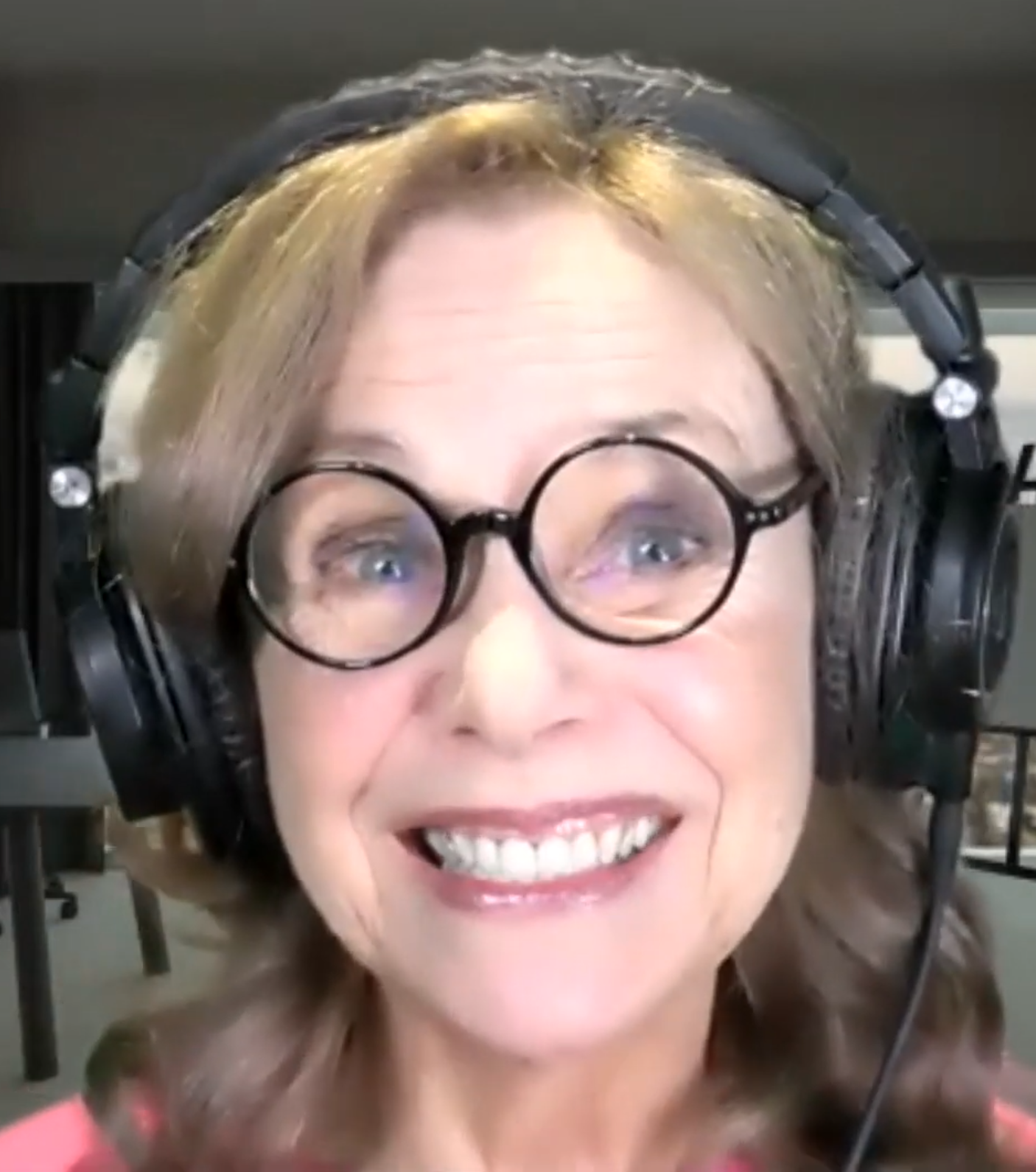
- Perdue in 2021
- Born: Mary Henderson; 1941 (age 84–85)
- Education: Radcliffe College; George Washington University
- Spouse: Frank Perdue (m. 1988; died 2005)
- Children: 2
- Father: Ernest Henderson

Mitzi Perdue (née Henderson; born 1941) is an American author, philanthropist, and anti-human trafficking advocate. She is an heiress to the Sheraton Hotel fortune and the widow of Perdue Farms president Frank Perdue. Perdue has had a multi-faceted career as a farmer, syndicated columnist, television host, and artist. Since the 2022 Russian invasion of Ukraine, she has focused on humanitarian efforts, including fundraising and establishing programs to combat human trafficking and provide mental health support in the region.

== Early life and education ==
Mary Henderson was born in 1941, the fifth and youngest child of Ernest Henderson, co-founder of the Sheraton Hotel chain. She lived in Lincoln, Massachusetts as a child and attended the Lincoln Public Schools. Her family, which included five children, had moved to Lincoln in 1941 to a house they called "Llanover," which is now the site of the Thoreau Institute. Her family later moved from Lincoln to Boston, a decision influenced by the high price of gasoline. She was taught the values of frugality and hard work, with her father insisting that his children earn what they wanted. Perdue spent her childhood summers at the family's home, Knollwood, in Dublin, New Hampshire. At age 15, she worked for her father's company filing credit cards, an experience she found so tedious it motivated her to excel academically.

Perdue attended Radcliffe College, graduating cum laude from Harvard University with a B.A. in government and international law. She earned a M.P.A. from George Washington University. Her 1965 thesis was on the topic of computers.

Following her father's death in 1967, Perdue and her siblings inherited his controlling stake in the Sheraton company at the age of 26. The family sold the company to the conglomerate ITT Inc. in 1968.

== Career ==
Perdue's first job after university was as a management intern at the I.R.S. commissioner's office. After her first marriage, she moved to California and became a rice farmer, eventually owning a rice farm near Sacramento and a vineyard in Napa Valley. As part of her agricultural interests, she bought land near the University of California, Davis so the college could run experiments on it. During this time, she served as president of American Agri-Women, an organization of 35,000 members.

Perdue's career as a columnist began after she, as a rice farmer, wrote a successful article for an inflight magazine that helped defeat a bill in the California State Legislature that would have banned the burning of rice straw. She later shifted her writing focus from food and agriculture to the environment and was the first person to pitch an environmental column to Scripps Howard. Beginning in 1980, she wrote a weekly syndicated column for Scripps Howard News Service called "The Environment and You." She was a columnist for The Daily Times and wrote for Genetic Engineering & Biotechnology News.

Perdue is the author of several books, including two biographies of her late husband, Frank Perdue: Fifty Years of Building on a Solid Foundation in 1989 and Tough Man, Tender Chicken: Business & Life Lessons from Frank Perdue in 2014. She also authored an autobiography titled I Didn't Bargain for This!, and a book on family businesses, How To Make Your Family Business Last in 2017. In California, Perdue also produced and hosted two television shows, Country Comments and Mitzi's Country Magazine. Perdue served as a delegate to a United Nations conference on women.

In 1992, while housebound with a ruptured disc, Perdue began a new hobby creating decorative art from eggshells. She calls her creations "Eggscapes" and makes them from emu, rhea, and ostrich eggs, sometimes fashioning them into purses and other objects. To make her egg purses durable, she coats them with a special two-part resin. Her work has been exhibited at the Ward Museum of Wildfowl Art, the Maryland Historical Society, and by the U.S. National Agricultural Library. She was also commissioned to create an egg to represent Maryland for the White House's Easter Egg collection.

=== Humanitarian work in Ukraine ===
Following the 2022 Russian invasion of Ukraine, Perdue became involved in humanitarian efforts. Her interest was sparked by her journalism on human trafficking, which led to an invitation from the head of the Kyiv Region Police to visit the war-torn country. Since the war began, she has written over 100 articles on topics affecting Ukraine, including human trafficking, land mines, and mental health issues. In her capacity as a war correspondent, she is a freelance journalist for Psychology Today and the Foreign Press Association.

To raise funds, Perdue auctioned her engagement ring, an emerald recovered from the 1622 shipwreck of the Spanish galleon Nuestra Señora de Atocha for $1.2 million. She has also worked with the non-profit Silent Bridge to establish shelters for women at risk of being trafficked, including a facility in Lviv.

Perdue is developing a free, AI-powered mental health service accessible via smartphone for Ukrainians, a project she has collaborated on with Ukrainian professionals and retired U.S. Army general David Petraeus. She reported that in 2023, while returning from a trip to Ukraine, she was the target of an assassination attempt at a hotel in Poland. In 2025, Perdue announced plans to sell a set of dinner plates formerly owned by Alexander I of Russia to raise additional funds, describing the sale as an act of "cultural warfare." As of September 2025, she has been to Ukraine five times since the 2022 invasion.

== Personal life ==
Perdue's first marriage ended in divorce. From that marriage, she has two sons, Jose and Carlos Ayala. In 1988, she met Frank Perdue, head of Perdue Farms, at a political reception. They married later that year and she moved to Salisbury, Maryland. Their marriage lasted until his death in 2005.

Perdue is known for maintaining a frugal lifestyle, which she states helps her stay connected to "the real world." She is fluent in Spanish and French and also speaks Russian.
