= Farm Journal =

United States agricultural trade magazine

- Founder: Wilmer Atkinson
- First issue: March 1877; 149 years ago
- Company: Farm Journal Media
- Country: United States
- Language: English
- Website: www.agweb.com/farm-journal-magazine
- ISSN: 0014-8008

Farm Journal is a United States agricultural trade magazine that was established in 1877, and is the leading United States farm magazine.

== History ==
Wilmer Atkinson founded the publication in Philadelphia in March 1877 as a small eight-page monthly magazine. Atkinson was editor for 40 years.

After advertising revenue dropped greatly in the early 1930s, the publication went into receivership in 1935, and new owners installed Graham Patterson as its publisher. Patterson revived the publication, tripling its advertising revenue of 1935 by 1937, and adding 338,000 subscribers. The Farmer's Wife was acquired in 1939. In 1955, the magazine (with a circulation then of 2.8 million) acquired The Country Gentleman (circulation 2.5 million), the second most popular agricultural magazine, from Curtis Publishing Company.

As of 2001 (its 125 anniversary year), its circulation was 700,000.

According to the magazine's website in 2022, the magazine currently publishes 13 issues a year and has 335,000 subscribers. Clinton Griffiths has served as editor since 2019.

The publication's parent company Farm Journal Media also publishes The Packer and Drovers Magazine. Its subsidiary Farm Journal Broadcast produces the television programs AgDay (hosted by Griffiths), U.S. Farm Report and Machinery Pete.

In March 2025, Farm Journal unveiled plans to place all their programs along with all of its others behind a paywall with the launch of its Farm Journal TV paid streaming service. It partially reversed this decision in May with its decision to launch a free ad-supported streaming television service, Farm Journal Now.
