= Drovers Magazine =

Drovers

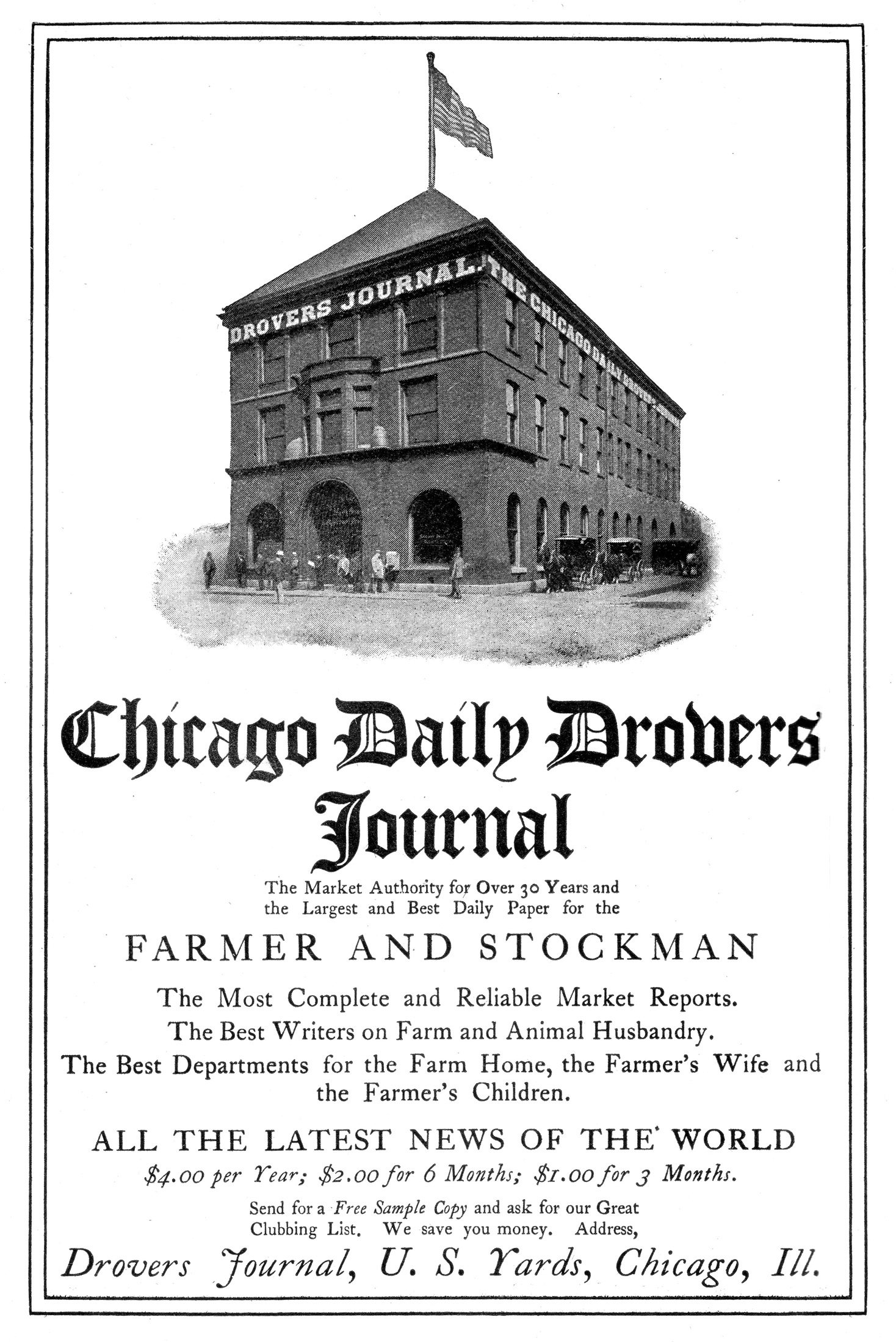
- Chicago Daily Drovers Journal ad 1905
- Categories: Trade magazine
- Frequency: monthly
- Founded: 1873
- Company: Farm Journal Media
- Country: United States
- Based in: Lenexa, Kansas
- Language: English
- Website: www.drovers.com
- ISSN: 1097-9131
- OCLC: 38330625

Drovers, America's beef business source (popularly referred to as Drovers Magazine or Drovers) is a monthly magazine that claims to be the oldest livestock publication in the United States. It derives its name from Drovers which is a British term for livestock herding.

== History and profile ==
Harvey Goodall started the Chicago Daily Drovers Journal in 1873 to report on the Chicago Stockyards.

In 1917 Jay Holcomb Neff purchased the publication and merged it with the Kansas City Drovers Telegram, which covered the Kansas City Stockyards.

In 1901 an editorial in the Kansas City Drovers Telegram entitled "Call It The American Royal" was end up causing the Kansas City Livestock Show to change its name to the American Royal.

The magazine later became a monthly was published by Vance Publishing until December 1, 2015. Today, the magazine is published by Farm Journal Media with offices in Kansas City suburb of Lenexa, Kansas.
