= Max Armstrong =

American agriculture broadcaster

Max Armstrong (born June 13, 1953, Owensville, Indiana) is a retired American agriculture broadcaster from Chicago, Illinois.

== Broadcast History ==
Armstrong's first job out of college was for the Illinois Farm Bureau as a broadcast editor, which was where he met Orion Samuelson. For 42 years, Max Armstrong and Orion Samuelson have partnered together, first on WGN radio, and later on the TV Show U.S. Farm Report, until creating the show This Week in Agribusiness.

Since July 2009, Armstrong has been director of broadcasting for Farm Progress. He produces and hosts the Farm Progress America and Max Armstrong’s Midwest Digest daily radio programs. Armstrong also hosts a three-minute feature, "Farming America", on the Tribune Radio Network.

From 1977 to 2009, Armstrong was the agri-business broadcaster for WGN Radio before the program transitioned to a weekly Saturday morning show and accompanying podcast entitled The Morning Show with Orion and Max.

In May 2023, Armstrong announced his retirement from farm broadcasting after 48 years and officially retired in June 2023. However, he still contributes to Farm Progress and This Week in Agribusiness still having a passion for both broadcasting and sharing stories of the farm community. In March 2026, Armstrong returned to the anchor desk at This Week in Agribusiness for a special tribute to the recently deceased Samuelson.

== "This Week in AgriBusiness" ==
Since August 2005, Armstrong has been co-host and co-founder of This Week in AgriBusiness, owned and produced with Samuelson. The show is a weekly agriculture television show, produced by OMAX Communications, LLC in cooperation with 22 Creative Group and Farm Progress. In addition to its syndication run, the show is broadcast on RFD-TV. On Jun 30 2023, Armstrong stepped down from the program full time when he announced he was retiring from farm broadcasting after 48 years but still contributes to the program with his tractor shed segments and as a fill in host.

== National Association of Farm Broadcasting ("NAFB") ==
In 2001, Armstrong was named Farm Broadcaster of the Year by the NAFB. In 2017, Max Armstrong was elected President of the NAFB. Armstrong was a member of NAFB for 40 years before being elected president.

== WGN Radio Walk of Fame ==
In 2016, Armstrong earned a plaque on the WGN Radio Walk of Fame in Chicago. Armstrong was full-time with WGN Radio for 32 years until 2009. The bronze plaque is in the sidewalk outside the Tribune Tower studios at 435 N. Michigan Ave. The induction ceremony took place on May 27, 2016, where Armstrong was honored along with 6 others.

== Max's Tractor Shed ==
On This Week in Agribusiness, Armstrong has a segment "Max's Tractor Shed", which features vintage tractors sent in by viewers. These stories were also translated into Max Armstrong's Tractor App, launched in 2013.

== "Stories from the Heartland" ==
In 2015, Armstrong published his first book, titled "Stories from the Heartland." He followed up with a second book, *More Stories from the Heartland*, in 2023.

== Philanthropy ==
For 22 years, Armstrong contributed his time as an appointed Fire Commissioner in the Western Suburbs of Chicago. Serving on a three-member board, he hires and promotes full-time firefighters and paramedics for one of the highest-rated (ISO 1) fire service organizations in the United States, the Lisle-Woodridge Fire Protection District.

== Awards and honors ==
- At Purdue University, Armstrong received honors as an "Old Master" in 2005 and was recognized as a "Noted Alumnus" in the 2009 Facts at Your Fingertips. Armstrong also was awarded an Alum Certificate of Distinction from the College of Agriculture and a Sagamore of the Wabash, given by the governor of Indiana.
- Max Armstrong was named an Honorary Master Farmer in 2018 by Prairie Farmer Magazine.
- Inducted into the National Association of Farm Broadcasting Hall of Fame in 2019.
- Max Armstrong's Tractor App received a Best of NAMA award, along with awards from the American Agricultural Editors' Association and American Web Design.
