= Bluegrass & Backroads =

- Created by: Todd Eklof
- Presented by: Todd Eklof, Mike Feldhaus, Bob Shrader, & Matt Hilton all at various times during the program's run
- Opening theme: Drifter's Lament
- Ending theme: Drifter's Lament
- Composer: K Manthei
- Country of origin: United States
- Original language: English
- No. of seasons: 14
- No. of episodes: 210

Production
- Executive producers: Todd Eklof, Bob Shrader, Matt Hilton
- Production location: United States
- Editors: Todd Eklof, Britt DePriest, Bob Shrader, Matt Hilton
- Camera setup: Single-camera
- Running time: 23.5 Minutes
- Production company: Kentucky Farm Bureau

Original release
- Network: Syndication
- Release: 2003 – present

Kentucky Farm Bureau's Bluegrass & Backroads is a television program produced by Kentucky Farm Bureau, based in Louisville, Kentucky. The half-hour program focused on interesting cultural, historical, and artistic aspects of the Bluegrass State. The program had several hosts and producers during its 14-season run.

== Format ==
The program normally consisted of four segments each focusing on different subjects. The segments were usually 4–6.5 minutes in length which usually began with introductions in the form of on-camera introductions by the host.

== History ==
The program was started in 2003 by former producer Todd Eklof with Kentucky Farm Bureau credited as its title sponsor. During the first season, the program was also hosted by Eklof, a former WHAS-TV reporter. From its inception the program aired on Louisville's WBKI TV, while being simulcast in Lexington, and Bowling Green, Kentucky's three largest markets. Soon after it began airing in Kentucky, the program found a national audience on RFD TV.

After the second season began Eklof was replaced as host by Farm Bureau radio producer and long-time agri-reporter Mike Feldhaus. After the end of the second season, Eklof left Kentucky Farm Bureau to become a full time minister. Feldhaus continued as host until season 5, he was replaced by Bob Shrader and Matt Hilton, who also produced the program. This Shrader/Hitlon duo remained in place until the conclusion of the program's 11th season when Shrader retired. During the program's 12th-14th season, Hilton served as the sole host.

== Awards and recognition ==
On July 28, 2009, Bluegrass and Backroads won two first-place awards in the Ohio Valley Regional Emmy Awards administered by the National Academy of Television Arts and Sciences. The program won top honors in the general magazine category and videographers Matt Hilton and Bob Shrader won Emmys for their photography in a story about a retirement farm for thoroughbred horses. The program has also won numerous video production awards from the American Farm Bureau Federation.

== Outlets ==
Bluegrass & Backroads can be seen on the following stations:

Area	Station	Air Time
Nationwide	RFD-TV	Wed. 2pm
Statewide Kentucky	KET	Varied airtimes
Louisville, KY/Lexington, KY	WBKI-TV	Sun.
Bowling Green, KY	WBKO-TV	Sun. 11am
Evansville, IN	WEHT-TV	Sat. 5pm
Paducah	WPSD-TV	Sat. 5am
Hazard, KY	WYMT-TV	Sat. Noon
