= Campfire Café =

- Genre: Outdoor cooking, music variety, comedy
- Created by: Bob and Pamela Alford
- Starring: Johnny Nix (original series); Pamela Alford and Larry Wiseheart (revived series)
- Opening theme: Campfire Café by The Roys
- Country of origin: United States

Production
- Running time: 60 minutes (original series); 30 minutes (revived series)
- Production company: EMG Productions

Original release
- Network: RFD-TV, Rural TV
- Release: August 8, 2002 – present

Related
- Cookin' Outdoors with Johnny Nix; The Cowboys' Kitchen

Campfire Café (also known as Campfire Café with Johnny Nix in its early days) is an American cooking show aired on RFD-TV. It has aired on the now defunct European TV channel, Rural TV. It, the original series, first aired on August 8, 2002, and was hosted by Albertville, Alabama native Johnny Nix at the time. The Nix version of the series ended sometime in early winter 2006. The revival, which aired in June 2006, not long after the original series ended, is hosted by Pamela Alford and Larry Wiseheart. The series is currently on hiatus.

== Celebrity Series ==
The Campfire Café Celebrity Series was first introduced during the 2005–2006 series, and again in 2011. Notable guests included country (and sometimes bluegrass) musicians Mark Chesnutt, Jett Williams, Mark Wills, Andy Griggs, John Conlee, Joe Diffie, the Kentucky Headhunters, Buddy Jewell, Ray Price, and the Roys.

== Media releases and cookbook ==
The series has been released on DVD at least three times. In 2005, a cookbook based on the series, Over the Open Fire was written by Pamela Alford and Johnny Nix.

== Spin-off ==
The series has spawned a spin-off, Cookin' Outdoors with Johnny Nix, which originally aired February 2012 on RURAL TV. It starred Nix in his hometown of Albertville, AL, cooking basically the same meals he would on the Campfire Café. As of the death of Nix's wife, the series has been cancelled.

== Trivia ==
There are three restaurants in the United States with the name Campfire Café, which includes, but are not limited to:

- Casper, Wyoming
- Scottsboro, Alabama
- Rimersburg, Pennsylvania
