= American Agri-Women =

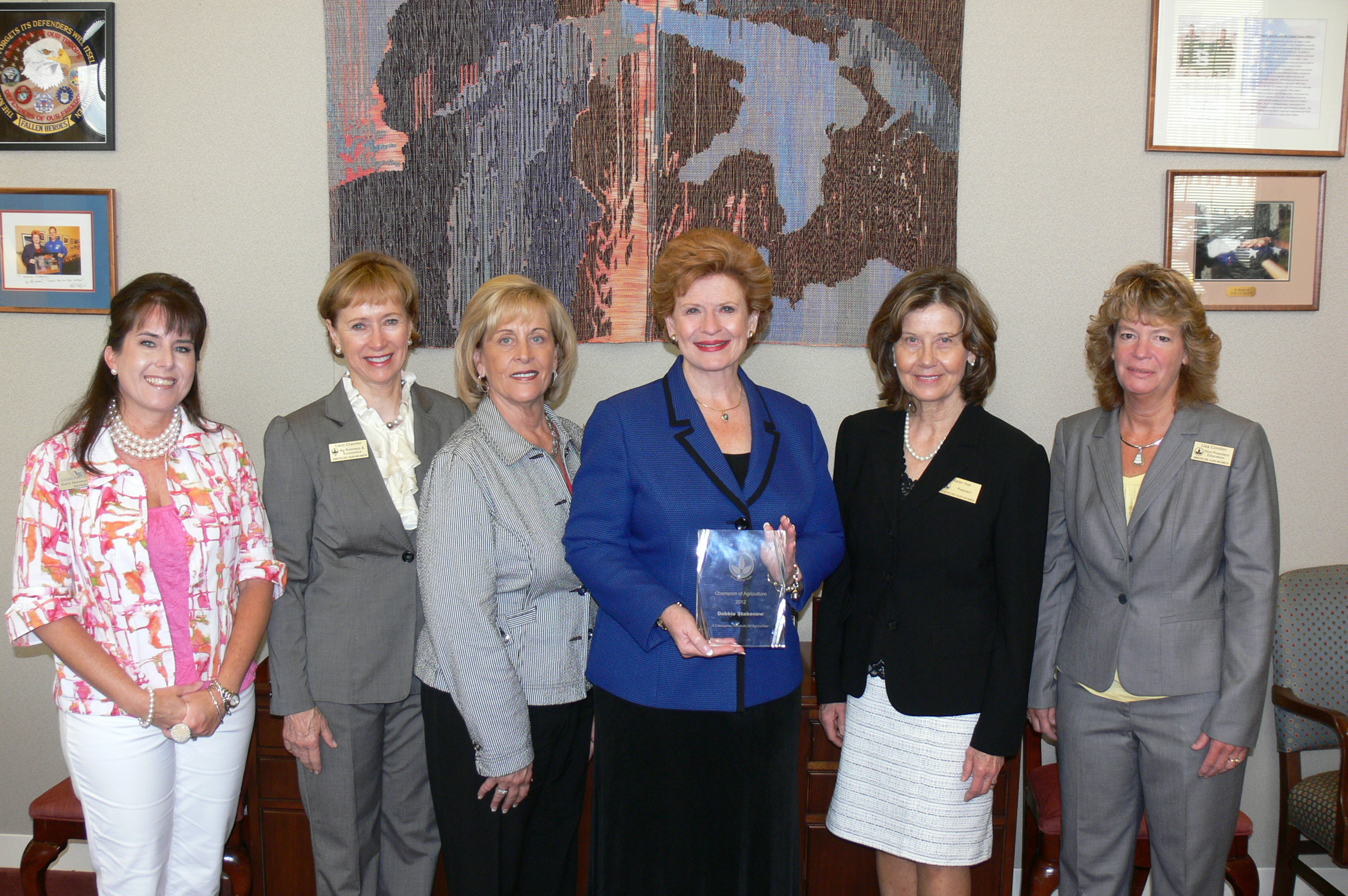
A representative of AAW presents U.S. senator Debbie Stabenow with the 'Champion of Agriculture Award' in 2012.

American Agri-Women (AAW) is an American national coalition of farm, ranch, and agribusiness women's organizations. Founded in 1974, it was established as a female-led group for women who wanted to organize separately from male-dominated agricultural organizations. AAW's stated mission is "to be the leading advocate for American agriculture" and "to provide education on policy issues that affect agriculture and rural America." The organization engages in lobbying, consumer education, and advocacy on agricultural policy.

== History ==
American Agri-Women was founded in 1974 as farm women sought to create organizations separate from male oversight. Its formation was part of a larger grassroots movement during the 1970s that signified a change in how farm women approached political activism. Initially, AAW was a coalition of twenty-one different women's organizations from across the American Midwest and West. The organization describes itself as the nation's largest coalition of its kind.

AAW has influenced and interacted with other agricultural groups. The organization Women Involved in Farm Economics (WIFE) sought its advice during its own formation, viewing AAW as a model for an effective women's organization, though WIFE ultimately decided against formally joining the coalition. The National Porkettes, a women's commodity group, chose to affiliate with AAW. In 1980, Gary S. Foster in the Mid-American Review of Sociology described AAW as the women's auxiliary to the American Agriculture Movement (AAM), suggesting it played a role in facilitating the participation of wives in that movement's events.

== Ideology and activism ==
From its early years, AAW adopted a strategy of deliberately "playing down" feminism as part of a broader effort to present rural people as intelligent and forward-thinking, yet politically moderate. At its 1977 national conference in Green Bay, Wisconsin, a New York Times reporter observed that the members were focused on "fighting for their families and their farms... and not for their own rights as women." This agricultural focus was articulated by Joan Adams, a national coordinator for AAW, who stated in an interview, "I'm no libber. The Equal Rights Amendment is their bag. Agriculture is mine."

The organization's activities have included lobbying and public education. In the late 1970s, AAW published a pamphlet titled, "How to be a vocal farm wife OR How are they gonna find out if WE don't tell them?" written by national organizer Laura Heuser, which encouraged women to form local groups and educate themselves on key issues.

In the policy arena, AAW has taken public stances on agricultural technologies. In 1996, the president of American Agri-Women testified before the U.S. Congress in support of biotechnology and the use of pesticides, arguing that organic production alone would be insufficient to meet global food demands.

== Membership and structure ==
Despite its national scope, a 1980 survey of farm and ranch women indicated that membership in exclusively women's agricultural groups was not widespread, with only 2 percent of respondents reporting membership in an organization like AAW or Women Involved in Farm Economics (WIFE). However, in 1996, an AAW representative stated that the organization represented over 50,000 women through a network of fifty state and commodity affiliate organizations.

Leadership roles in AAW have been held by women directly involved in agriculture. Notable members include Joan Adams, a cattle rancher from Oklahoma who served as a national coordinator, and Laura Heuser, a Michigan orchard manager who was a national organizer. At one point, Mitzi Perdue the wife of chicken magnate Frank Perdue also served as the organization's president.
