= The Joan Rivers Show =

American syndicated talk show (1989–1993)

- Starring: Joan Rivers
- Country of origin: United States
- No. of seasons: 5

Production
- Production locations: CBS Broadcast Center, New York City
- Running time: 60 minutes (inc. adverts)
- Production companies: PGHM Productions, Tribune Entertainment

Original release
- Network: Broadcast syndication
- Release: September 5, 1989 – December 26, 1993

Related
- The Late Show with Joan Rivers (Fox)

The Joan Rivers Show is an American first-run syndicated daytime talk show that was hosted by Joan Rivers. The show ran for five seasons, from September 5, 1989, to December 26, 1993.

== History ==
In September 1988, Tribune Entertainment announced that Rivers would host a daily one-hour talk show set to premiere in September 1989.

The show aired for five seasons and ended in December 1993. The show was nominated for numerous Emmy Awards, with Rivers winning the Daytime Emmy Award for Outstanding Talk Show Host in 1990.

In the mid-1990s the show was repeated on E! for several months. Repeats aired on the Decades TV network from January to August 2019, and as of January 2021, 128 episodes were available for free streaming on the Vidmark app, and the Roku Channel on the Roku store.

Rivers had previously hosted a late-night talk show, The Late Show with Joan Rivers on Fox, which dropped her as the host in May 1987.

== Format and production ==
The Joan Rivers Show was a one-hour daytime talk show combining celebrity interviews, topical discussions and Rivers's comedic monologues. The format allowed Rivers to move between conventional celebrity interviews and discussions of contemporary social issues, popular culture and personal subjects.

The series was produced in New York City at the CBS Broadcast Center at 530 West 57th Street. It was produced by Rivers's PGHM Productions in association with Tribune Entertainment. Paramount Domestic Television handled distribution during the show's first two seasons before Tribune assumed distribution.

== Reception ==
=== Awards and nominations ===
Awards and nominations
Award	Year (Note: Indicates the year of ceremony)	Category	Nominee(s)	Result	Ref.
Daytime Emmy Awards	1990	Outstanding Talk Show Host	Joan Rivers	Won	
Daytime Emmy Awards	1992	Outstanding Achievement in Makeup	Mark Sanchez	Won	
