= The Farmer's Wife (women's magazine) =

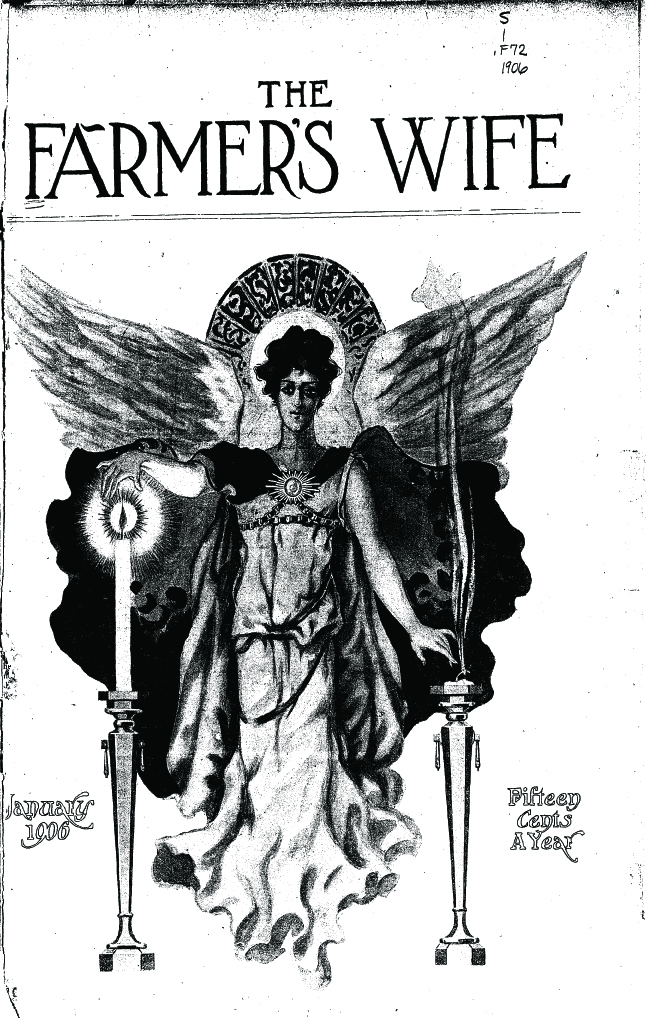
- January 1, 1906 cover
- Editor: F.W. Beckman
- Categories: Women's magazine
- Frequency: Monthly
- Total circulation: 1,00,000 (1970)
- Founded: 1897
- Final issue: 1939 (independently); 1970 (combined into Farm Journal)
- Company: Webb Publishing Co.
- Country: USA
- Based in: St. Paul, Minnesota
- Language: English

The Farmer's Wife was a monthly women's magazine published in St. Paul, Minnesota.

First published in 1897 and ending as an independent publication in 1939, it offered advice about farming, housekeeping and cooking, also publishing fiction. At its peak, it had well over a million subscribers nationally.

The magazine was established by Webb Publishing Company, which was founded by Fargo, North Dakota newspaperman Edward A. Webb. The company moved to St Paul, Minnesota in 1890. The company continued to grow, eventually becoming one of the largest agricultural publishers in the United States.

The Farmer's Wife was sold to Farm Journal in 1939. The magazine at that time was re-titled Farm Journal and Farmer's Wife (last three words in smaller print) until 1945. It was then published as Farm Journal with a back section titled The Farmer's Wife until 1970.
