= Tribune Entertainment =

American television production company

- Formerly: Mid-America Video Tape Productions (1964–1966); WGN Continental Productions (1966–1982); Tribune Productions (1982–1983); Tribune Entertainment Company (1983–1996)
- Type: Division
- Industry: Television
- Founded: 1964; 62 years ago
- Defunct: December 18, 2007; 18 years ago
- Fate: Shut down
- Successor: Tribune Studios
- Headquarters: Chicago, Illinois, U.S.
- Production output: TV shows
- Parent: Tribune Broadcasting

Tribune Entertainment (formerly Mid-America Video Tape Productions, WGN Continental Productions, Tribune Productions and Tribune Entertainment Company) was a television production and broadcast syndication company owned and operated by Tribune Broadcasting. It was started in 1964 as a subsidiary of WGN-TV in Chicago. Many programs offered from Tribune Entertainment have been broadcast on the company's television stations.

Throughout the company's existence, Tribune Entertainment mainly produced first-run syndicated programs (including Geraldo, At the Movies and Earth: Final Conflict), along with some television special (such as the Hollywood Christmas Parade and Soul Train Music Awards).

== History ==
=== Tribune Entertainment ===
Tribune Entertainment was founded in 1964 as Mid-America Video Tape Productions as a subsidiary of television station WGN-TV in Chicago, in order to syndicate National Barn Dance to several television markets. In 1966, it formally became WGN Continental Productions, as a videotape subsidiary of WGN Continental Broadcasting Company. In 1975, Dale M. Juhlin left WGN Continental Productions in order to start out his own production company which was based in Chicago.

Over the years, the company grew that in 1980s that Tribune's first successful program that was distributed for syndication were the agricultural news program U.S. Farm Report, which debuted in 1975; and Independent Network News, a syndicated news program designed for Independent station that was produced by Tribune's New York City station WPIX and debuted in 1980.

In 1982, Tribune picked up newspaper film critics Roger Ebert and Gene Siskel under the show name of At the Movies before losing the hosts four years later to Buena Vista Television. Later on that year, WGN Continental Productions had become Tribune Productions, and Sheldon Cooper, who was previously of Tribune's own television station WGN-TV had assumed president of the unit. In 1983, it became Tribune Entertainment Company, and received agreements to develop two-hour movies for syndication. It gradually expanded its programming to include British programs, and mini-series, as well as a television movie co-production deal.

In 1984, it purchased the television syndication rights to the motion picture The Smurfs and the Magic Flute for use in the syndication market, via Tribune stations, as well as other TV stations on a cash and barter basis. In 1985, another long-running program that Tribune had distributed was the syndicated musical Soul Train, just 9 years after it moved to WGN-TV, from syndication, which debuted in 1971. Also that year, it picked up the rights to the British cop show Dempsey and Makepeace for American screening, produced by ITV weekend franchisee London Weekend Television. In 1987, Tribune partnered with rival syndicatior Coca-Cola Telecommunications on an aborted effort of two projects, namely Gunfighter, which was set for a two-hour telefilm on the Tribune stations on a barter basis, but it never realized.

In 1987, it entered into an agreement with Paramount Domestic Television to handle sales of Geraldo, with Tribune producing the series. That year, Tribune Entertainment Company announced that they would move production of two in-house series, At the Movies and The Farm Report, from the WGN-TV studios in Chicago, to indie production company Polycom in order to make the move a cost-cutting move for the studio, and retains its own crew of producers and distributors in the Chicago area and many engineers at the studio had been laid off too. In 1988, Bud Grant, who had just left CBS partnered with Tribune to start Grant/Tribune Productions to produce TV shows. In 1989, Tribune signed comedienne Joan Rivers to host the daytime syndicated talk program, The Joan Rivers Show, five years before doing Can We Shop?. In 1990, it split their association with Paramount, with Tribune taking sales of both Geraldo and The Joan Rivers Show. On March 1, 1991, Tribune had its Geraldo show as the first US program in the USSR under the recent Glasnost policy. In 1993, Grant split off from Tribune, thus renaming Grant/Tribune Productions back to Bud Grant Productions.

In January 1994, Tribune Entertainment started a country music initiative across broadcast television, concert touring, direct marketing, home video distribution, pay-per-view and radio syndication. Under the initiative, programming would start in the fall 1994 with a weekly syndicated country music television and companion radio program then home video releases and pay-per-view events in 1995. With Nashville Country Club Inc., Tribune announced as a part of this initiative to operate "Road" performance clubs and restaurants with the first to open in 1995. In July 1995, Tribune sold 22 episodes of "Road", their canceled country music show, to The Nashville Network for broadcast starting in January 1996. In 1996, it entered into an agreement with King World Productions to distribute Geraldo, which would remain on the air until 1998 via a joint first-run development pact deal, and Tribune to continue handling barter advertising sales of the show. At that point, it was re-named to Tribune Entertainment.

In 1998, Tribune Entertainment and Morgan Creek Productions attempted to make a TV show based on The Exorcist film franchise, but the project never got off the ground.

In 2001, after Mutant X, Marvel Studios and Tribune Entertainment signed a partnership where Marvel and Tribune developed television shows based on Black Cat and Daughters of the Dragon. In January 2003, Tribune Entertainment was signed on as distributor of the DIC Kids Network, which came onto the air, beginning in the fall of 2003.

In June 2003, the company signed a distribution deal with Hearst Entertainment to supply pictures and took over syndication rights to its properties. In July 2003, the company purchased syndication rights to 34 DreamWorks Pictures feature films to use on Tribune stations starting in August 2006. The films would be also sold to other stations via barter or sale while supervising marketing for the films.

On December 18, 2007, Tribune Entertainment announced it would exit the program distribution business. In 2008, it sold its Tribune Studios for $125 million to Hudson Capital, LLC.

In 2010, Tribune announced that it would be considering a re-entry into the syndication market with two new talk shows: one a tabloid talk show hosted by Bubba the Love Sponge, and another, "Big Willie" (since renamed The Bill Cunningham Show). Both programs filmed pilot programs and Bill Cunningham's show aired during a week long test on Tribune stations.

=== Tribune Studios ===
Tribune Studios
- Type: Division
- Industry: Television
- Predecessor: Tribune Entertainment
- Founded: March 19, 2013; 13 years ago
- Defunct: September 17, 2019; 7 years ago
- Fate: Acquired by Nexstar
- Key people: Matt Cherniss (president)
- Production output: TV shows
- Parent: Tribune Broadcasting

On March 19, 2013, Tribune appointed Warner Bros. executive Matt Cherniss as president/general manager of a newly formed production division called Tribune Studios (not to be confused with the physical Sunset Bronson Studios, which formerly held the Tribune Studios name and continues to house the facilities of Tribune's KTLA). Tribune Studios will produce programs primarily for the company's 23 television stations and WGN America, some of which will receive national distribution. The initial programs produced by the company starting with the 2012–13 season will include The Bill Cunningham Show (originated through Tribune Broadcasting, now produced by ITV Studios America), The Arsenio Hall Show and The Test (the latter two programs were co-productions with CBS).

Tribune Studios's first original drama, since its formation, for its sister company WGN America was Manhattan which aired from 2014 to 2015 for 2 seasons.

== Filmography ==
This is a listing of programs which were either produced or distributed by Tribune Entertainment & then later on, Tribune Studios:

=== Tribune Entertainment ===
==== Children’s programing ====
- Ghostbusters (1986) co-produced with Filmation and co-distributed with Group W Productions
- DiC Kids Network (2003-2007) distributor; produced by DIC Entertainment

==== Comedies ====
- South Park (1997–present) ad sales only from 2005 to 2008 and co-distributed with Debmar-Mercury until 2008, produced by Celluloid Studios (1997); Braniff Productions (1997–2006); Parker-Stone Productions (2006–2007); South Park Studios (2007–present) and Comedy Partners

==== Daytime shows ====
- Beyond with James Van Praagh (2002–2003)
- The Charles Perez Show (1994–1996)
- Geraldo/The Geraldo Rivera Show (1987–1998) co-distributed with Paramount Television (1987–1989) and King World Productions (distribution: 1996–1998)
- The Joan Rivers Show (1989–1993)
- Can We Shop?! (1994) mixed talk and shopping show hosted by Joan Rivers co-produced with QVC and Regal Communications

==== First-run syndicated shows ====
- The 5th Wheel (2001-2004) ad sales only from 2001 to 2002, produced and distributed by Universal Worldwide Television (now NBCUniversal Television Distribution)
- Adventure Inc. (2002–2003) co-produced with Fireworks Entertainment
- American Idol Rewind (2006–2008) distributor, co-produced by 19 Entertainment and produced by FremantleMedia North America
- Animal Rescue (2006–present) producer, distributed by Telco Productions
- The Apollo Comedy Hour (1992–1995) distributed by Tribune Entertainment and produced by Apollo Theatre Productions
- At the Movies (1982–1990; no relation to the later At the Movies series although both series shared original hosts Gene Siskel and Roger Ebert) replacement hosts: Rex Reed (1986–90), Bill Harris (1986-88), Dixie Whatley (1988-1990)
- Blind Date (1999-2006) ad sales only from 1999 to 2002, produced and distributed by Universal Worldwide Television (now NBCUniversal Television Distribution)
- Beastmaster (1999–2002)
- Bzzz! (1996–1997)
- Dempsey and Makepeace (1985-1986) co-produced by London Weekend Television, US distribution only
- Dog Tales (2007–present) produced, distributed by Telco Productions
- Earth: Final Conflict (1997–2002)
- Family Feud (2001–2007) distributor, produced by Pearson Television (now FremantleMedia North America)
- Gene Roddenberry's Andromeda (2000–2005) co-produced with Fireworks Entertainment
- Malibu, CA (1998-2000) co-produced with NBC Enterprises
- Missing (2003–present) producer, distributed by Telco Productions
- Monsters (1988–1991) distributor
- Mutant X (2001–2004) co-produced with Fireworks Entertainment
- National Barn Dance (1964-1967)
- Night Man (1997–1999)
- Out of the Blue (1995-1996)
- The Road (1994–1995) country-and-more music television show produced with High Five Productions, 22 episodes
- Soul Train (distributor, 1985–2008) produced by Don Cornelius Productions
- Tales from the Darkside (1983–1988) distributor & co-producer
- T. and T. (1988–1990)

==== Teen sitcoms ====
- California Dreams (2001-2005) distributor, produced by NBC Enterprises

==== Late night talk/variety shows ====
- The Dennis Miller Show (1992)

==== Made-for-TV movies/Miniseries ====
- Emma: Queen of the South Seas, starring Barbara Carrera (1988)
- Final Shot: The Hank Gathers Story (1992) starring Nell Carter and George Kennedy
- The Vernon Johns Story, starring James Earl Jones (1994) produced by Laurel Entertainment
- Voyage of Terror: The Achille Lauro Affair (1990) starring Burt Lancaster

==== News/information series ====
- Independent Network News/USA Tonight (1980–1990)
- Now it Can Be Told (1991–1992)
- U.S. Farm Report (1975–2008) produced by Farm Journal Media

==== Specials ====
- Hollywood Christmas Parade (1985–1998)
- Innocence Lost: The Erosion of American Childhood (1987) on WGN and hosted by Geraldo Rivera
- The Mystery of Al Capone's Vaults (1986)
- Soul Train Christmas Starfest (1998–2006)
- Soul Train Lady of Soul Awards (1995–2006)
- Soul Train Music Awards (1987–2007)

=== Tribune Studios ===
==== Daytime shows ====
- The Bill Cunningham Show (2011–2016), produced with ITV Studios America
- The Robert Irvine Show (2016–present), produced with Robert Irvine Productions and Irwin Entertainment

==== Late night talk/variety shows ====
- The Arsenio Hall Show (2013–2014), produced with Arsenio Hall Communications, Eye Productions Inc. and Octagon Entertainment Productions. Distributed by CBS Television Distribution

==== Dramas ====
- Manhattan (2014–2015) WGN America, produced with Skydance Television and Lionsgate Television
- Outsiders (2016–2017) WGN America, produced with Sony Pictures Television
- Underground (March 9, 2016 – 2017) WGN America, produced with Get Lifted Film Company, Safehouse Pictures, Sony Pictures Television, Weed Road Pictures
