= Patrick Gottsch =

American businessman, founder of RFD-TV

- Born: June 3, 1953; Omaha, Nebraska, U.S.
- Died: May 18, 2024 (aged 70); Fort Worth, Texas, U.S.
- Occupation: Media executive
- Spouses: Shirley Hickey (div. 1991) Angie Good (m. 2017)
- Children: 3

Patrick Gottsch (June 3, 1953 – May 18, 2024) was an American media executive. He was the founder of Rural Media Group, which includes RFD-TV.

== Early life ==
Patrick Gottsch was born on June 3, 1953, in Omaha to Bernard Gottsch, a farmer, and Gloria Gottsch (née Borowiak). He was raised on a farm in Elkhorn, Nebraska. He attended Sam Houston University on a baseball scholarship for one year until leaving due to a hand injury. He worked as a farmer, commodities broker, and satellite dish installer.

== Broadcasting career ==
In 1988, Gottsch started RFD-TV, which aired news, weather, agribusiness and market reports. The channel went into bankruptcy a year later, as no cable network would carry the station. From 1991 to 1996, he worked for Superior Livestock Auction in Fort Worth, Texas.

In 1996, Gottsch left Superior to restart RFD-TV, this time as a non–profit at the suggestion of Charlie Ergen, co-founder of Dish Network. He developed the channel which aired existing agriculture, equine, music, and rural programs. It began airing on Dish Network in 2000, then on DirecTV in 2002. In 2007, he converted the business into a for–profit company. The channel began simulcasting Imus in the Morning broadcasts, which had been cancelled by MSNBC. RFD-TV subsequently began airing on Comcast cable network.

In 2017, Gottsch started The Cowboy Channel, a rebranding of the FamilyNet network, and in 2023, The Cowgirl Channel.

== Personal life ==
Gottsch was married to Shirley Hickey until their divorce in 1991. After divorcing, he moved to Fort Worth, Texas, with his two daughters. In 2017, he married Angie Good with whom he had another daughter.

In 2013, Gottsch led the effort to break the Guinness World Record for the largest Pick-Up Truck Parade at the Indianapolis Motor Speedway.

Gottsch died on May 18, 2024, at a hotel in the Fort Worth Stockyards district, aged 70. He was succeeded in leadership of Rural Media Group by his two eldest daughters, Raquel Gottsch Koehler and Gatsby Gottsch Solheim.
