= Lutheran Social Services of Illinois =

U.S. non-profit organization

Lutheran Social Services of Illinois (LSSI) is the social service arm of the Evangelical Lutheran Church in America (ELCA)'s three Illinois synods. It is headquartered in Des Plaines, Illinois.

LSSI started in 1867 as an orphanage for children who lost their parents in the cholera epidemic.

LSSI Services include foster care, mental health services, alcohol and drug treatment, affordable senior housing, residential programs for people with developmental disabilities, and services that help families who have been impacted by incarceration. LSSI serves over 50,000 Illinois residents each year.

LSSI is Accredited, Licensed, Certified, and Approved by several Local/State/Federal Government agencies as well as several business groups. It is the largest non-governmental statewide social service provider in Illinois.
