= American Agriculture Movement =

Farmers' organization

The American Agriculture Movement is an organization consisting primarily of small American farmers. It was formed in 1977 in Campo, Colorado, by a group of farmers. They attempted to organize a strike in which farmers would no longer buy or sell anything.

== Protest ==
On December 10, 1977, approximately 5,000 farmers held a rally in Lincoln, Nebraska, and were joined by Nebraska Governor J. James Exon. The farmers all rode their tractors, and soon other farm states had tractor rallies. Gloria Carter Spann, a sister of President Jimmy Carter even participated in one rally.

While the farmers appeared to have widespread sympathy, relatively few farmers actually went on strike and refused to grow crops. The organization therefore decided to have a tractor rally in Washington, DC. The Carter administration agreed that the Farmers Home Administration would stop all foreclosures, but soon after the rally had ended, it resumed foreclosures of farms with past due loans.

In 1979, the farmers again drove their tractors to Washington, drove on the National Mall, and blocked traffic, which caused significant tie-ups.
