= U.S. Farm Report =

American television series

- Created by: Orion Samuelson
- Presented by: Orion Samuelson (1975-2005); John Phipps (2005-2014); Tyne Morgan (2014-present)
- No. of seasons: 50
- No. of episodes: 2,743

Production
- Running time: 30 minutes (1975-2005); 60 minutes (2005-present)
- Production companies: WGN Continental Broadcasting Company (1975-1984); Tribune Entertainment (1984-2007); Farm Journal Media (2007-present)

Original release
- Network: Syndication
- Release: January 1, 1975 – present

U.S. Farm Report is an American weekly syndicated television news program focused on agriculture, presented in magazine format, focusing on agriculture and agribusiness. U.S. Farm Report was created in 1974 by Orion Samuelson and premiered on January 1, 1975, as a half-hour program that ran for 30 minutes, syndicating commercially to local stations. In 2005, U.S. Farm Report became a 60-minute program, expanding the format from 30 minutes to 60 minutes.

U.S. Farm Report covered major news items in and around the world of agriculture; we traveled with our cameras from coast to coast to present the very best in comprehensive and informative farm reporting. This capsule version of our efforts also provides viewers with the weather outlook, offering up-to-date forecasts, as weather affects agricultural news and helps viewers prepare from spring planning to fall harvest. In addition to legislative information on agriculture and agribusiness, U.S. Farm Report offers the opportunity to take a personal look into agriculture with commentary. U.S. Farm Report was first produced by WGN Continental Broadcasting Company from 1975 to 1984, and then by Tribune Entertainment from 1984 to 2007, and then by Farm Journal Media since 2007, a Philadelphia-based company that owns several agricultural media properties including Farm Journal magazine.

Streaming full U.S. Farm Report episodes are available on the station's website. In March 2025, Farm Journal announced plans to launch a subscription video-on-demand service, Farm Journal TV. Following its successful streaming launch, it was also announced in April 2025 that the program would move to Farm Journal's FAST streaming channel along with AgDay and Machinery Pete TV.

The first host of U.S. Farm Report was broadcaster Orion Samuelson, who hosted the program from the show's debut in 1975 until 2005, along with Max Armstrong joining Samuelson as co-host and reporter in 1977. In 2005, Samuelson left the show and was replaced by John Phipps. In 2014, John Phipps left U.S. Farm Report and was replaced by Tyne Morgan.

In 2000, RFD-TV picked up the show, a run that would continue until Farm Journal disaffiliated from RFD-TV in April 2025. Orion Samuelson, the original host of USFR, had a longtime working relationship with RFD-TV even before the move of USFR. He later moved to a competing program with a similar format, This Week in Agribusiness, which airs on many of the same stations as USFR but is produced by competing farm newspaper Farm Progress; he eventually retired from that position in 2020.
