= AgDay =

American syndicated agriculture news TV program (1982–)

- Created by: Gerald Badeaux and Neal Nussbaum
- Starring: Haley Bickelhaupt
- Country of origin: United States

Production
- Running time: 30 minutes
- Production company: Farm Journal Media

Original release
- Network: Syndication
- Release: August 16, 1982 – present

Related
- U.S. Farm Report

AgDay is a syndicated daily half-hour television program presented in magazine format focusing on agriculture news, agribusiness, and country living. It generally has aired in early morning timeslots on stations throughout the country and also aired weekday mornings on the digital cable and satellite channel RFD-TV until 2025. It is hosted and produced by Haley Bickelhaupt.

Clinton Griffiths was the news anchor of AgDay TV since 2010, but left the show in March 2026 to focus on other responsibilities with Farm Journal. Griffiths was replaced by Farm Journal reporter Haley Bickelhaupt, an Illinois native with an extensive farming background.

== Background ==
AgDay debuted on August 16, 1982. Hosted by Wayne Jenkins (WTHI-AM/FM/TV) and Bob Jenkins (ESPN), the half hour ag-report featured a national news segment, "The Helming Report" (a market segment), "Money Matters" with Jim Wilson, CPA (a financial segment), and the morning "AccuWeather Forecast Farm Weather Report" with meteorologists Terry Kelley, and Mike Nelson. The show was taped in the studios of WTHI-TV in Terre Haute, Indiana, and broadcast from the uplink facilities at WISH-TV, Indianapolis, Indiana, via video tape. In the show's early years, the show had a Space Age theme, using fonts, logos and graphics associated with space age and/or science fiction themes, to reflect the show's emphasis on its satellite distribution and futuristic focus. AgDay would move away from these themes in the late 1980s.

The original anchor team Wayne and Bob Jenkins, were not related. Wayne a long time farm director and weatherman for WTHI-TV, would later give the weather reports as the show evolved. Bob Jenkins was the farm director for Indianapolis radio station WIRE, and was a broadcaster on the fledgling cable network ESPN, while also working for the Indianapolis Motor Speedway Radio Network. The anchor team was supported by reporters Jayne Dula, Ralph Seely, Bill Pemble (USDA) and Craig Maurer (Washington, D.C., bureau chief); producer Al Dowbnia; director Jay Strasser; coordinating producer Jim Berry; field producer Heidi Gutman; additional meteorological support from Valarie Jones and Barbara Robertson; production manager Rod Garvin; production assistants Shawn Terrell, Don Green and Kevin Badeaux; camera operators Bob Baskerville and Lucie Horst; graphics Lonnie Bailey; audio Bart Pearson and John Matthews; and secretarial support by Lynn Shanks and Julie Mounts. It was originally the property of Creative Farm Media and Creative Media Productions, and was controlled by executive producers Gerald Badeaux and Neal Nussbaum.

In December 1982 the show moved its office and production to Indianapolis, producing and up-linking AgDay from the studios of WFYI TV. From their new offices at Keystone at the Crossing, it launched into covering the agriculture around the world, traveling to Canada, Rome, Brussels, Paris, and Hong Kong to bring US viewers international developments in key farm issues of the day. It also relied on a network of stringer reporters and videographers to gather news from across the US. As Bob Jenkins slowly moved away from farm broadcasting to concentrate on motor-sports coverage for ESPN and to anchor "Speedweek", reporter Brian Baxter replaced him as the co-anchor, with Bob Jenkins appearing from time to time as his ESPN schedule would allow. Jayne Dula also departed and was replaced with Kathy Shew and Lisa Jackson.

AgDay changed production facilities several more times as the staff evolved. Jim Berry, Shawn Terrell and later Brian Baxter would serve as the show's producer. AgDay's production moved to Nova Production Studios, then to WPDS (later becoming WXIN), and eventually back to WFYI Television. A bankruptcy eventually forced the split and sale of assets. This put the program back under the control of Neal Nussbaum, who decided to re-locate the production to WLFI-TV in Lafayette, Indiana. At that point, the remaining Ag Day staff, including anchors Wayne Jenkins and Brian Baxter, remained at WFYI to create and produce a new syndicated program called the "Morning Ag Report". Following the stint at WLFI-TV, with Garth Clark anchoring the show, the "AgDay" production was again moved, this time to South Bend's WNDU with entirely new staff and on air-talent, with one key exception: former production assistant Don Green returned after leaving the show at the time of its initial move to Indianapolis, to produce the new-look show, featuring Al Pell. AgDay has been based at WNDU ever since, with their weather department providing the forecasts seen on the show. Mike Hoffman served as the show's chief meteorologist beginning in 2001; Hoffman retired in 2021, and rotating meteorologists handle weather duties since then.

Publisher Farm Journal Media acquired AgDay in 1998, merging production with its own weekly farm newsmagazine U.S. Farm Report under its ownership.

The show is distributed through a network of broadcast stations, with a live streaming feed provided via Farm Journal Now, a free ad-supported streaming television service. On-demand episodes are hosted on the paid platform Farm Journal TV, with select highlights available via the Farm Journal YouTube channel.

RFD-TV carried the program for over two decades until Farm Journal's decision to disaffiliate from the network in 2025.

== Format ==
The first segment consists of daily news information related to farm policy as well as producer and consumer news, usually including a brief teaser of weather.

The second segment is “Markets Now”, an interview devoted to agribusiness containing market news as well as a market discussion between Farm Journal’s Michelle Rook and a professional involved in agriculture marketing and trading.

A weather forecast occupies the middle segment, led by a staff meteorologist from WNDU. The report focuses on drought conditions as well as precipitation estimates, and also includes daily temperatures and a look at the jet stream for the week ahead. Monday's weather also includes a 30-day outlook for temperatures and precipitation. The segment concludes with daily forecasts for three random small towns each day.

The fourth segment varies in content, with “Tractor Tales” with Greg Peterson, known as “Machinery Pete”, filling the segment on Mondays.

The final segment is "In The Country". This segment features a report often from either colleges of agriculture or government agencies on programs or events and human interest stories occurring throughout farm country.

On selected holidays such as Thanksgiving, Christmas, and New Year's Day, special AgDay programs will air, highlighting features and holiday-related stories from farm country. The Thanksgiving special is known as "Harvest of Thanks", and the Christmas special is titled "Christmas in the Country." No weather or market reports are included in these pre-recorded newscasts.

AgDay is the sister program of U.S. Farm Report, a weekly farm program hosted by Farm Journal’s Tyne Morgan. The two programs’ hosts often serve as fill-in hosts on the other program.

AgDay episodes had been available free of charge via the Internet, through their own website, through the Farm Journal YouTube account, on demand and by way of the live video streams of select affiliates. In March 2025, Farm Journal unveiled plans to place the program along with all of its others behind a paywall with the launch of its Farm Journal TV paid streaming service. Clips from the show remain available on Farm Journal’s YouTune channel. Audio-only podcasts are available for free on most major podcast platforms.
