= RFD-TV =

American television network for rural audiences

- Country: United States
- Broadcast area: United States
- Headquarters: Nashville, Tennessee

Programming
- Language: English
- Picture format: 1080i HDTV (downscaled to letterboxed 480i for the SDTV feed)

Ownership
- Owner: Rural Media Group, Inc.
- Sister channels: Rural Radio Channel 147 on SirusXM

History
- Launched: December 1, 2000; 25 years ago

Links
- Website: www.rfdtv.com

Availability

Terrestrial
- Digital terrestrial television: 36.1 (Redwood Falls, Minnesota); 22.1 (Cortez, Colorado)

Streaming media
- Service(s): DirecTV Stream, RFD-TV Now, Sling TV

RFD-TV is an American pay television channel owned by Rural Media Group, Inc. The channel features programming devoted to rural issues, concerns and interests. The channel's name is a reference to Rural Free Delivery, the name for the United States Postal Service's system of delivering mail directly to rural patrons. Production and uplinking facilities for RFD-TV are located at 49 Music Square West, Music Row in Nashville, Tennessee. RFD-TV's sister radio channel is Rural Radio on SiriusXM. RFD-TV formerly owned a theater in Branson, Missouri, where some variety shows that air on RFD-TV were filmed; the station also owned the Imus Ranch in Ribera, New Mexico.

RFD-TV is the flagship network for Rural Media Group. Launched in December 2000, RFD-TV is the nation's first 24-hour television network featuring programming focused on the agribusiness, equine and the rural lifestyle, along with traditional country music and entertainment.

As of 2017, RFD-TV operates on a full-service format. Mornings and the early part of daytime feature syndicated newsmagazines and a five-hour block of news, weather (forecasting services on the network are outsourced to The Weather Channel) and agricultural commodity market prices, in the basic format of an American cable news outlet. An additional newscast airs during the evening hours. The remainder of the daytime and evening schedule consists of horse-related magazines, coverage of rodeo and other Western sports, rural lifestyle programs, reruns of classic television programs with rural appeal, and music programs centered around country music, polka, and Southern gospel.

Infomercials, which were previously publicly banned from the network, appear during the overnight hours. The network also features brokered programming in the form of its call-in program Rural America Live, and brokered televangelism from Charles Stanley, David Jeremiah and John Hagee.

As of February 2015, RFD-TV is available to approximately 52 million pay television households (44.8% of households with television) in the United States. It is currently carried by satellite providers Dish Network and DirecTV and their associated streaming services (Sling TV and DirecTV Stream, respectively), as well as through cable providers such as Mediacom, Charter Communications, Cox Communications and Armstrong. In addition to its subscription coverage, RFD-TV is offered as an Internet television feed; the feed is currently paywalled and requires a paying subscription. In March 2020, RFD-TV launched a streaming app RFD-TV Now, making RFD-TV programming available on tablets, phones, and connected TVs. It was added to Sling TV on April 4, 2017, as part of the "Heartland Extra" add-on service. With an average of 136,000 viewers in 2016, RFD-TV has some of the highest viewership relative to availability compared to other "ultra-niche" networks with similar or wider distribution owned by major corporations.

== History ==
RFD-TV (Rural Free Delivery Television) was launched in 1988 by Patrick Gottsch. The channel was not picked up by any carriers. This attempt ended in bankruptcy. Another attempt was made in the 1990s, but could not get funding. Gottsch continued to look for programming. Beginning in 2000, the channel was a non-profit. RFD-TV was picked up by Dish Network in December 2000 then DirecTV in 2002. It was initially launched as a nonprofit channel, using a loophole in federal regulations to encourage the two satellite providers to pick up the channel by carrying educational and informational content, an idea originally suggested by Dish Network. The Federal Communications Commission struck down this effort in 2007 due to the channel's reliance on commercial television content. The channel was then restructured as a for-profit enterprise, for which it rented a Nashville studio and hired experienced TV executives including Ed Frazier, former Liberty Sports CEO.

RFD-TV was initially conceived as effectively four channels in one space: an agriculture channel, a horse channel, a rural music and entertainment channel, and a rural lifestyle channel, relying mainly on existing programming from the syndicated market to fill its broadcast day. The acquisition of Imus in the Morning in 2007 after over a decade on MSNBC was designed to retain its satellite carriage after the FCC ruling as well as convince additional cable providers to add RFD-TV to its channel lineups. Imus left for Fox Business Network in 2009.

RFD-HD, a high definition feed of RFD-TV that broadcasts in the 1080i resolution format, first began broadcasting in high definition in the fall of 2007.

In mid-2009, the channel gained carriage on Cox Cable. RFD began a rural news department in late 2009 with bureaus in London and Washington, DC.

Rural Media contracted with Sony Pictures Television in September 2013 to handle RFD-TV's and other properties' national ad sale. By August 2014, Rural Media Group began moving its Northstar Studio/RFD-TV staff and some of its Omaha, Nebraska staff into subleased office space at 49 Music Square West, Music Row in Nashville, Tennessee. The rest of the Omaha staff would follow in 2015 except Gottsch.

In the 2016 presidential election, the Trump campaign purchased all possible advertising spots in the last two weeks before the election. By January 2017, the channel opened a bureau in Sao Paulo, Brazil, to cover Brazil's growing agriculture industry, which is heavily interconnected to the United States through companies like Brazil's JBS.

A Canadian version of the channel was launched on February 1, 2020, on Shaw Direct television systems through a partnership with Rural Media.

== Programming ==
=== Imus in the Morning ===
When Don Imus returned to radio in late 2007, he had also struck a deal to simulcast Imus in the Morning on RFD-TV after moving to WABC for the rest of his career. The program was broadcast on the channel from 6 to 9 a.m. Eastern Time on weekdays, along with a primetime telecast of the program on its high definition simulcast channel RFD-HD. During much of the show's run, a news ticker was shown with the day's news, similar to that featuring when Imus in the Morning was simulcast on MSNBC. The video simulcast of the program ended its run on RFD-TV on August 28, 2009, and moved to Fox Business Network several weeks later.

After Imus's retirement, RFD-TV owner Patrick Gottsch purchased Imus's 3,000-acre ranch.

=== The Big Joe Polka Show ===
One of the first programs to be aired on RFD-TV was The Big Joe Polka Show, a polka and dance variety program hosted by Omaha resident Joseph "Big Joe" Siedlik, which continued to be popular among the network's estimated (approximately) 40 million+ available households until it ended its run on January 1, 2011. In 2010, litigation commenced between RFD-TV and The Big Joe Polka Show's creators/producers of Polka Cassettes of Nebraska, involving several lawsuits and countersuits (mostly over a contractual dispute). RFD-TV contends that it had an option to air the program until December 31, 2010, while Polka Cassettes of Nebraska contends that the show was being aired against their wishes, and after the cessation of the effectiveness of the previous contract, which expired on December 31, 2009. In August 2010, a multimillion-dollar "slander and defamation" suit was brought against Polka Cassettes of Nebraska by RFD-TV. In 2011, the court granted the defendants' motion for summary judgment and dismissed RFD-TV's lawsuit as being without merit. In January 2015, Joseph "Big Joe" Siedlik died.

The show was replaced by The RFD-TV Polka Fest on January 5, 2011, and aired during the same timeslots. RFD-TV Polka Fest was later replaced by Mollie B Polka Party, hosted by Mollie Busta in July 2011. Wednesday afternoons, starting in September 2015 featured selected reruns of the Big Joe Polka Show under the name Big Joe Polka Classics.

Other programs added in Winter 2007-2008 included a revival of Crook & Chase (which returned to TNN [now Heartland] upon its relaunch in 2012) and Bluegrass & Backroads.

=== Machinery Pete ===
Greg Peterson "Machinery Pete" half-hour show averaged 125,000+ viewers weekly on RFD-TV. "Machinery Pete" is the brand name for the business of Greg Peterson, who is an expert on data within researching and tracking machinery auction prices since 1989. Expertise within the farmers and dealers to look at and estimate the value on used farm equipment and the real value at auction. Greg Peterson was quoted in November 2021 in Bloomberg news regarding how much over the estimate a sale went. Crain's Chicago Business also referenced "Machinery Pete" on the booming records in Farm Machinery Auction Pricing in 2021 as did the Watertown Daily Times and The Packer. "As harvest ends, we will see farmers at equipment auctions, not for the machinery - but for parts," Peterson said. "We're already hearing from guys talking about buying a second planter or sprayer, just for parts."—"Machinery Pete" Greg Peterson as quoted by Reuters in October 2021. As of November 2021, Machinery Pete has 47,100 subscribers on YouTube.

Greg Peterson is from Benson, Minnesota, and attended Gustavus Adolphus College in St. Peter, Minnesota. Starting "Machinery Pete" back in 1989 out of his basement in Rochester, Minnesota buying a small company for $2,600 that had a subscription service for prices that followed auction prices. A traditional book was mailed out four times a year to a customer base before the age of the Internet. Later on, "Machinery Pete" used computers to compile Used Values Index reports. These reports painted a larger and more complete picture of the value of farm and construction equipment.

"Machinery Pete" launched his website over 20 years ago machinerypete.com, followed by a Facebook page for a global audience. For the last 25 plus years, "Machinery Pete" has been covering farm equipment auctions for various industry magazines and trade journals.

In 2021, "Machinery Pete" had over 40 Apple Podcasts.

Greg Peterson has been covering farm equipment auctions for various industry magazines for more than 25 years and did the same during six seasons of RFD's Machinery Show. Now Peterson has his own show, which shares its title with his nickname: "Machinery Pete." Each episode features Peterson traveling to a farm machinery auction, where he meets some of the people who attend the sales, where items like tractors and skid steers are sold. He also provides his analysis of current and historical trends in the used equipment market and answers viewers' questions about what their equipment is worth in the "Ask Machinery Pete" segment.

Peterson's show, Machinery Pete TV, is offered in syndication through Farm Journal (also syndicator of AgDay and U.S. Farm Report) in addition to its RFD run; he also contributes to those shows as an interviewee.

On April 27, 2025, Farm Journal disaffiliated from RFD-TV and redirected viewers to its new free ad-supported streaming television platform Farm Journal Now, which will carry live streams of Machinery Pete, AgDay and U.S. Farm Report. The three programs will continue to be offered in syndication.

=== Current programming ===
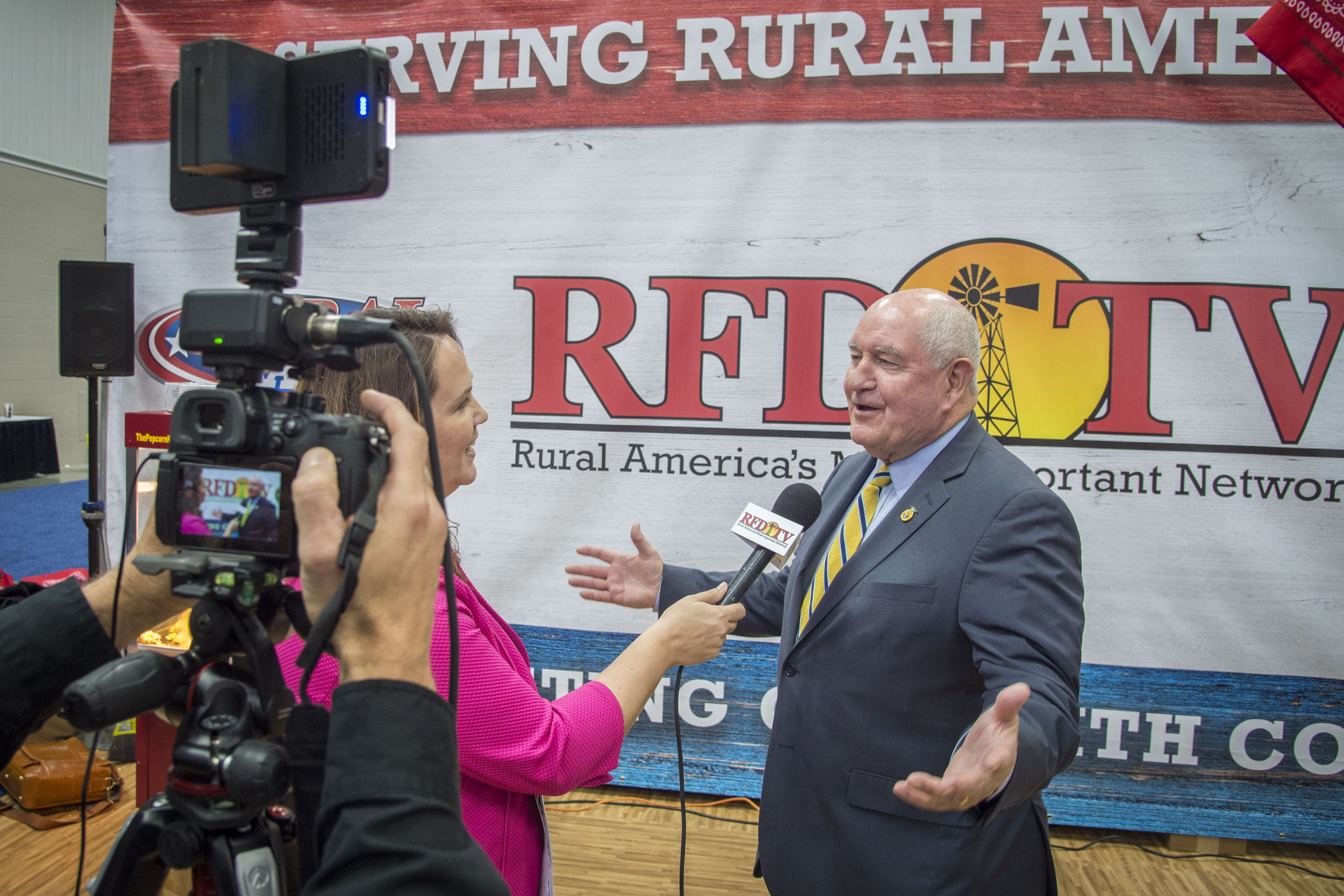
Sonny Perdue being interviewed on RFD-TV in 2017.

- Ag PhD
- The American Rancher
- America's Heartland
- The Bluegrass Trail
- Best of America by Horseback
- Big Joe Polka Show (entertainment)
- California Bountiful
- Classic Tractor Fever
- Corn Warriors
- Country's Family Reunion (and its variants)
- Cow Guy Close (commodity markets news hosted by Scott Shellady, a.k.a. the "Cow Guy")
- Dailey & Vincent
- The Daniel O'Donnell Show
- Debbe Dunning's Dude Ranch Roundup
- The Duttons Through the Years
- FFA Live! (National FFA Convention & Expo Livestream)
- Farm Report Georgia
- Gaither Gospel Hour
- Gentle Giants
- Heart to Heart Classics with Stan Hitchcock
- Hee Haw
- Hidden Heritage (hosted by Paul LaRoche)
- I Love Toy Trains
- In Touch
- The Jimmy Sturr Show
- Larry's Country Diner
- Little Britches on the Road
- Little Britches Rodeo
- Market Day Report
- The Marty Stuart Show
- Mecum Auctions: Gone Farmin'
- The Merlin Gene Show
- Midwest Country
- Ms. Lucy’s Cajun Classroom (lifestyle)
- NTPA Tractor Pull
- Pathway to Victory with Robert Jeffress
- Positively Paula
- The Penny Gilley Show
- The Porter Wagoner Show
- PRCA National Finals Rodeo
- Presleys' County Jubilee
- Ray Stevens' Cabaray Nashville
- The Red Skelton Show
- Red Steagall Is Somewhere West of Wall Street
- Reno's Old-Time Country Music (hosted by Ronnie Reno, son of Don Reno)
- Rural Evening News
- Rural Heritage
- Rural Town Hall (public affairs/news)
- Small Town Big Deal
- Texas Country Reporter
- This Week in Agribusiness with Mike Pearson
- This Week in Louisiana Agriculture
- Training Mules and Donkeys (equine)
- Trains & Locomotives
- Turning Point
- Voices of Agriculture (Virginia)
- The Wilburn Brothers Show
- Wild Kingdom
- WoodSongs Old-Time Radio Hour

=== Former programming ===
The following programs were aired on RFD-TV at one point, but are no longer listed on the official website.

- AgDay
- Campfire Cafe
- Country Carnival
- Crook & Chase
- Cumberland Highlanders
- Imus in the Morning (2007 – August 2009; entertainment
- The Joey Canyon Show
- Live from Daryl's House (Music and entertainment)
- The Lone Ranger
- Lynn Palm (equine)
- Machinery Pete TV
- Monty Roberts (equine)
- Out There with Baxter Black
- Ralph Emery
- RFD-TV the Theatre (Branson, Missouri)
- Richard Shrake (Equine)
- Richard Winters (Equine)
- The Roy Rogers Happy Trails Theatre/The Roy Rogers Show
- RV Today (Rural Lifestyle)
- The Shotgun Red Variety Show
- Showcase Jubilee
- Tim Farmer's Country Kitchen
- Turnin' to Country (Travel / Lifestyle)
- UK Extension (Agriculture)
- U.S. Farm Report (Agriculture)

== Rural Media Group ==
Rural Media Group
- Type: Private
- Industry: Media
- Founded: 1988; 38 years ago
- Founder: Patrick Gottsch
- Headquarters: 49 Music Square West, Music Row, Nashville, Tennessee, US
- Subsidiaries: RFD-TV; RFD-TV Magazine; Rural Radio; RMG Events LLC

Rural Media Group is a media holding company.

RFD-TV (Rural Free Delivery Television) was launched in 1988 by Patrick Gottsch but was not picked up until 2000. The group expanded with the RFD-TV: The Magazine in 2003 then RFD HD in 2008.

Rural Media Group bought the Country Tonite/Ray Stevens Theater with 2000 seats in Branson, Missouri, and renamed it the RFD-TV Theatre on March 24, 2007.

A British version, Rural TV, was launched in 2008, followed by a US launch on February 15, 2012, on Dish Network. Rural focused on news and international programming. In October 2012, Rural Media purchased from Interactive Television and Gaming Networks (formerly Comstar Media) FamilyNet. The two channels would combine on January 1, 2013.

Rural Media contracted with Sony Pictures Television in September 2013 to handle national ad sales for RFD-TV, Rural TV and Rural Radio. By August 2014, Rural Media Group began moving its Northstar Studio staff and some of its Omaha, Nebraska staff into subleased office space at 49 Music Square West, Music Row in Nashville, Tennessee. The rest of the Omaha staff would follow in 2015 except Gottsch. At the same time, RMG Events LLC was formed and headed by RMG CEO Randy Bernard to run RMG events such as The American Rodeo.

FamilyNet was changed over to a western lifestyle network on July 1, 2017, tapping RFD-TV programming to start. This was the original plan for FamilyNet, but seeming limited programming and interest, Gottsch held off. With RFD-TV drawing more viewers for its western programming and events like rodeos, the switch was made. Thus, The Cowboy Channel was launched.

Rural Media Group in early 2018 purchased the Imus Ranch, near Santa Fe, as a television production base for its two TV channels' programs. Best of America by Horseback, Debbie Dunning’s Dude Ranch Round-Up, and Gentle Giants were programs selected to film there starting in March 2019.

The Cowgirl Channel was launched on March 1, 2023. It specializes in programming about women in professional rodeo, western fashion, and rural lifestyles in general through the perspectives of women. Rodeos not televised on The Cowboy Channel are televised on The Cowgirl Channel.

Patrick Gottsch, the founder and president of RFD-TV and Rural Media Group, died on May 18, 2024, at the age of 70. He was succeeded in leadership of Rural Media Group by his two eldest daughters, Raquel Gottsch Koehler and Gatsby Gottsch Solheim.

On November 20, 2024, Teton Ridge announced it had acquired The Cowboy Channel, The Cowgirl Channel, and their companion streaming service, Cowboy Channel+, from Rural Media Group. RMG Co-Owner Raquel Gottsch Koehler addressed the sale of the two rodeo networks in a statement following the sale:

"For Rural Media Group, this sale allows us to strategically refresh and focus on our flagship network, RFD-TV, as it approaches its 25th anniversary, with the goal to expand our presence across multiple platforms. We will now be able to strengthen our programming and dig deeper into our core mission to reconnect city with country, bringing stories of agriculture, rural life, conservation, and land stewardship to more people than ever before along with an expansion in music and entertainment, as Rural Media Group will continue operating the Auction Barn Studio in the historic Fort Worth Stockyards in addition to its studios on Music Row in Nashville, Tennessee. This sale is about growth and investing in RFD-TV, RFD-TV Now, Rural Radio Channel 147 on SiriusXM, and FarmHER + RanchHER, growing our presence in the rural media space to tell even more stories about America’s heartland and beyond."
