= Breakfast television =

Type of morning television show

United States television dayparting; breakfast television is blue and labelled "Early Morning".

Breakfast television (Europe and Australia) or morning show (Canada and the United States) is a type of news or infotainment television programme that broadcasts live in the morning (typically scheduled between 5:00 and 10:00 a.m., or if it is a local programme, as early as 4:00 a.m.). Often presented by a small team of hosts, these programmes are typically marketed towards the combined demography of people getting ready for work and school and stay-at-home adults and parents.

The first – and longest-running – national breakfast/morning show on television is Today, which set the tone for the genre and premiered on 14 January 1952 on NBC in the United States. For the next 70 years, Today was the number one morning program in the ratings for the vast majority of its run and since its start, many other television stations and television networks around the world have followed NBC's lead, copying that program's successful format.

== Format and style ==
"I like to think viewers never knew what was round the corner," says Owen. "One minute it would be a laugh a minute with Eric Morecambe ... the next minute it would be a top government official."

— The Guardian on the appeal of breakfast television, 2023

Breakfast television/morning show programs are geared toward popular and demographic appeal. The first half of a morning program is typically targeted at work commuters with a focus on hard news and feature segments; often featuring updates on major stories that occurred overnight or during the previous day, political news and interviews, reports on business and sport-related headlines, weather forecasts (either on a national or regional basis), and traffic reports (generally common with locally produced morning shows on terrestrial television stations serving more densely populated cities, though this has begun to filter down to smaller markets as intelligent transportation system networks have spread further into smaller communities).

Combining serious news and informal segments is breakfast television's appeal to viewers. Later in the program, segments will typically begin to target a dominantly female demographic with a focus on "infotainment", such as human-interest, lifestyle and entertainment stories. Many local or regional morning shows feature field reports highlighting local events, attractions and/or businesses, in addition to those involving stories that occurred during the overnight or expected to happen in the coming day.

Morning programs that air across national networks may offer a break for local stations or affiliates to air a brief news update segment during the show, which typically consists of a recap of major local news headlines, along with weather and, in some areas, traffic reports. In the United States, some morning shows also allow local affiliates to incorporate a short local forecast into a national weather segment – a list of forecasts for major U.S. cities are typically shown on affiliates which do not produce such a "cut-in" segment.

During the early morning hours (generally before 10:00 a.m. local time), local anchors will mention the current time – sometimes, along with the current temperature – in various spots during the newscast, while national anchors of shows covering more than one time zone will mention the current time as "'xx' minutes after the hour" or "before the hour"; the time and/or temperature are also usually displayed within the station or programme's digital on-screen graphic during most segments within the broadcast. (Most local stations originally displayed the current time and temperature only during their morning newscasts, though many began to extend this display within their logo bug to their midday and evening newscasts starting in the mid-1990s, starting in major markets and eventually expanding to stations in smaller markets.) Especially with their universal expansion to cable news outlets in the early 2000s, many news-oriented morning shows also incorporate news tickers showing local, national and/or international headlines; weather forecasts; sport scores; and, in some jurisdictions where one operates, lottery numbers from the previous drawing day during the broadcast (although these may be shown during rolling news blocks or throughout the programming day on cable news outlets, some local stations that have utilized tickers solely for their morning shows have extended them to later newscasts, whereas others only display them during their morning news programs).

The three breakfast morning shows in the United States (CBS Mornings, Today, and Good Morning America) air live only in the Eastern Time Zone. (Spanish-language shows air live in the Eastern, Central, and Mountain time zones.) Stations in the remaining time zones receive these programs on a tape delay, with an updated feed broadcast to viewers in the Pacific Time Zone. Occasionally, a morning show may be broadcast nationwide if their staff is handling coverage of breaking news during its broadcast hours, or special live news events (such as British royal weddings).

== History ==
=== United States ===
==== Network and local programs ====
The first morning news program was Three to Get Ready, a local production hosted by comedian Ernie Kovacs that aired on WPTZ (now KYW-TV) in Philadelphia from 1950 to 1952. Although the program (named after WPTZ's channel number, 3) was mostly entertainment-oriented, the program did feature some news and weather segments. Its success prompted NBC to look at producing something similar on a national basis. Following the lead of NBC's Today, which debuted in January 1952, and was the first morning news program to be aired nationally, many other broadcast stations and television networks around the world followed and imitated that program's enormously successful format with news, lifestyle features, and personality.

CBS, in contrast, has struggled since television's early age to maintain a long-term morning program. Though it initially tried to mimic Today when it debuted a morning show in a two-hour format in 1954, the show was reduced to one hour within a year in order to make room for the new children's television series Captain Kangaroo. The network abandoned the morning show in 1957. From the late 1960s throughout the 1970s, the CBS Morning News (later re-used as the title of the network's early-morning newscast from 1987 to 2024) aired as a straight one-hour morning newscast that had a high rate of turnover among its anchors. In January 1979, CBS launched Morning (titled in accordance with the day of the week, such as Monday Morning, and airing Sunday through Friday), which focused more on long-form feature reports, a format that would be most closely associated with its Sunday edition, although it emphasized hard news during the week. This format, however, was relegated exclusively to Sundays after two years, and still airs under the title CBS News Sunday Morning. It was not until 1982 that Captain Kangaroo ended its run on weekdays (it continued on weekend mornings before ending altogether in 1984), allowing CBS to expand its morning show to a full two hours. However, the high rate of turnover among anchors returned. An ill-fated comedic revamp of the show, The Morning Program, debuted in 1987; with its awkward mix of news, entertainment and comedy bits, the program (which was produced primarily by a unit of the network's entertainment division) was heavily panned by critics. After that, however, came This Morning, which has to date had the longest run of any of CBS' morning show attempts. This Morning was eventually cancelled 12 years later, being replaced by The Early Show in 1999; The Early Show, in turn, ceded to the new version of CBS This Morning (this time featuring a format focused more on hard news and interviews, excising lifestyle and infotainment segments) in January 2012; CBS This Morning proved to be more successful, but anchor turnover (especially after the removal of Charlie Rose after allegations of workplace sexual harassment) and other factors eroded its audience, resulting in its replacement by CBS Mornings in 2021—a program that carries a skew towards news and lifestyle content similar to its competitors.

ABC was a latecomer to the morning show competition. Instead of carrying a national show, it instead adopted the AM franchise introduced by many of its local stations in 1970. KABC-TV's AM Los Angeles launched the national career of Regis Philbin and was a direct predecessor to his syndicated talk show Live!. AM Chicago on WLS-TV would later evolve into The Oprah Winfrey Show, which went on to become one of the most successful programs in the history of American television syndication (however, Oprah usually aired in the afternoon in most markets). The Morning Exchange on WEWS-TV was Cleveland's entry into the franchise; with its light format, ABC (after a brief but failed effort to launch the Los Angeles version nationally as AM America) launched a national program based closely on the format of The Morning Exchange and Good Day! (a similar program that aired on Boston affiliate WCVB-TV) in November 1975 under the title Good Morning America. GMA has traditionally run in second place (ahead of CBS's various morning efforts but behind Today), but has surpassed Today in the ratings a few times throughout its history (first in the early 1980s, then from the late 1980s to the mid-1990s and again regularly since 2012). Since the 1980s, Live! (now hosted by Kelly Ripa and her husband Mark Consuelos) has been produced and distributed by ABC's syndication arm, primarily for ABC stations (although not exclusively, as it is carried on stations affiliated with other networks), but produced by ABC's New York City owned-and-operated station, WABC-TV.

Members of PBS, the nation's main public television network, typically air children's programming from the network's PBS Kids lineup during the morning and daytime hours. Some members may also carry exercise-oriented programs as early-morning programming (such as Lilias, Yoga and You). From 1974 to 1995, Maryland Public Television offered A.M. Weather, a 15-minute national weather update staffed by meteorologists from the National Oceanic and Atmospheric Administration (NOAA). From 1994 to 2002, WPBT distributed the Morning Business Report, a 15-minute financial news spin-off of the syndicated Nightly Business Report (which was also distributed by the Miami member station).

Fox, the youngest of the "Big Four" broadcast networks, does not have a morning show and has only once attempted such a program; the network attempted to transition sister cable network FX's Breakfast Time to Fox as Fox After Breakfast in 1996, to little success, but instead has ceded to its local affiliates and Fox Television Stations, which have programmed fully local morning news programs that are at parity or have overtaken their Big Three network counterparts.

The CW (and before that, its co-predecessor The WB) carried The Daily Buzz for its national small-market feed, The CW Plus (as well as its predecessor, The WB 100+ Station Group) from 2002 to 2014, in lieu of a national program; that program was also mainly syndicated to affiliates of The CW and MyNetworkTV (and predecessors The WB and UPN) as well as several independent stations until its abrupt cancellation in April 2015. Generally since then, outside of a few select CW and MyNetworkTV affiliates, stations usually program infomercials, a local extension of a Big Three sister station's morning newscast during national morning shows, or as Sinclair Broadcast Group did from July 2017 until March 2019, returned to programming for children under the KidsClick block. In 2021, Sinclair launched a rolling syndicated newscast, The National Desk (since renamed The National News Desk), formatted as a "commentary-free" hard news program (despite the company's history of requiring its stations to air conservative-leaning must-run news and opinion segments during their local newscasts); the program has since expanded to include evening and weekend editions, along with a companion to the morning broadcast, The National Weather Desk (focusing on weather news, climate reporting and regional forecasts).

A few of the major Spanish language broadcast networks also produce morning shows, which are often focused more on entertainment and tabloid headlines, interviews, and features, rather than hard news. ¡Despierta América! is the longest-running Spanish language morning program on American network television, having aired on Univision since April 1997. Similar to CBS's struggles to maintain continuity with its morning shows, Telemundo had made several attempts at hard news and traditional morning shows dating to the late 1990s, including Cada Dia, and Un Nuevo Día, which launched in 2008 under the title ¡Levántate!, and would win the Daytime Emmy Award for Outstanding Morning Program in Spanish in 2015 and 2017. In 2021, Telemundo attempted another relaunch of its morning show, Hoy Dia, which was positioned as a news-centric morning show closer in format to its NBC counterpart Today. However, in 2022, Telemundo used a hiatus for the 2022 FIFA World Cup to move Hoy Dia from its news department to its entertainment division, resulting in the program transitioning to an entertainment-oriented format.

Local television stations began producing their own morning shows in the 1970s, most of which mirrored the format of their network counterparts, mixing news and weather segments with talk and lifestyle features; stations in many mid-sized and smaller markets with heavy rural populations also produced farm reports, featuring stories about people and events in rural communities, rundowns of agricultural product exchange data from the previous day and weather forecasts tailored to farmers (although the number of these programs have dwindled on the local level since the 1990s, three such programs still exist in national syndication, the weekdaily AgDay and the weekend-only U.S. Farm Report and This Week in Agribusiness (the latter of which was created and remains hosted by former U.S. Farm Report personalities Orion Samuelson and Max Armstrong), which have also received national distribution on cable and satellite via RFD-TV; the latter program had also previously aired on WGN America until 2008).

More traditional local newscasts began taking hold in morning timeslots (mainly on stations that maintain their own news departments) in the late 1980s and early 1990s. These programs began as half-hour or one-hour local newscasts that aired immediately before the national shows and were led in by more hard news-focused, early-morning network newscasts (NBC News at Sunrise, ABC's World News This Morning and the early-morning iteration of the CBS Morning News; the former has since been replaced by Early Today, while the latter shows are now titled Good Morning America First Look and CBS News Mornings). However, since that time, they have slowly expanded, either by pushing an earlier start time or by adding additional hours on other stations that are owned, managed or which outsource their local news content to that station, thereby competing with the network shows.

Similarly, following the launch of Fox in the late 1980s, many news-producing stations affiliated with major networks not among the traditional "Big Three television networks" or which operate as independent stations began producing morning newscasts that compete in part with national counterparts in part or the entirety of the 7:00 to 9:00 a.m. time period; by the late 2000s, these stations began to expand their morning shows into the 9:00 a.m. hour (where they normally compete with syndicated programs on ABC and CBS stations, and the third hour of Today on NBC stations) and in some markets, expanded into the 10:00 a.m. hour by the late 2010s. The expansion of news on Fox affiliates, along with advertising restrictions involving with the Children's Television Act, effectively ended the morning children's television market on broadcast television by the mid-2000s. Beginning in the early 2010s, stations began experimenting with 4:30 a.m. and even 4:00 a.m. newscasts in some major markets (and even gradually expanding into mid-size and some smaller markets), pushing local news further into what traditionally is known as an overnight graveyard slot. Some local morning newscasts, which formerly had both softer "morning" musical and graphical packages and lighter news, along with feature segments with local businesses and organizations, now resemble their later-day counterparts with hard news coverage of overnight events.

Some locally produced morning shows that utilize a mainly infotainment format still exist, most prominently among some large and mid-market stations owned by the E. W. Scripps Company (which inherited the Morning Blend format originated in 2006 by the Journal Media Group following its 2015 acquisition of that company's stations) and Tegna Inc. (which inherited many of the local talk/lifestyle shows originated by Belo – such as Good Morning Texas on Dallas ABC affiliate WFAA – prior to the 2014 acquisition of the latter group by the predecessor broadcasting unit of Gannett), and often serving as lead-outs of national network morning shows. These shows are not usually produced by a station's news department, as they are intended as a vehicle for advertorial content that promotes local businesses and events.

==== Cable television ====
Cable news outlets have adopted the morning show format as well. Fox & Friends on Fox News follows a similar format to the networks' morning shows (though it incorporates conservative commentary similar to that featured on other Fox News programs), while MSNBC's Way Too Early and Morning Joe follow a pundit-driven format with a larger focus on political analysis and panel discussions. Some morning shows have been television simulcasts of talk radio shows, including Imus in the Morning (which aired on MSNBC from 1997 to 2007, when the network cancelling its contract for the program after host Don Imus made a racially charged remark during a broadcast, and subsequently aired on Fox Business and later RFD-TV before being cancelled in 2018), and sports talk programs such as Boomer and Gio (originally simulcast on MSG Network in the New York market from 2010 to 2013, and then nationally on CBS Sports Network starting in 2014) and The Dan Patrick Show (which has been simulcast on various cable networks and streaming platforms since 2009, and since 2020, has streamed on Peacock).

CNN had primarily aired rolling news blocks (such as Early Edition and CNN Live This Morning) in the morning hours until it debuted American Morning, which followed a format focusing upon news and political headlines, in 2001. In 2011, the program was replaced by Starting Point, which focused more upon topical discussions. Amid low ratings, Starting Point was replaced in 2013 by New Day, shifting towards general news and politics. In 2022, New Day was replaced by CNN This Morning, an attempt by then-CNN president Chris Licht to emulate the CBS This Morning and Morning Joe formats he had installed during his tenures at CBS News and MSNBC. It was cancelled in 2024 amid another change in leadership and associated cuts; a block of CNN's daytime program CNN News Central was moved into its timeslot, while the This Morning branding was retained by CNN's weekend morning show, and repurposed by CNN's early-morning program Early Start (which had originally premiered alongside Starting Point).

The Weather Channel originally has long featured forecast programs with a primary emphasis on business travelers and work commuters, culminating in the debuts of Your Weather Today (in 2000) and its business travel-focused, early-morning counterpart First Outlook (in 2001). Since 2014, America's Morning Headquarters (AMHQ), previously hosted by former Good Morning America weather anchor Sam Champion, has served as its main morning show; the program's weekday edition has expanded over time, extending to seven hours (lasting until 2:00 p.m. Eastern Time) by 2024, with a shorter four-hour edition on weekends. With a shift toward a mix of weather and infotainment programs in the late-2000s, TWC premiered Wake Up with Al—an early-morning show hosted by Al Roker of Today—in 2009. The show was cancelled in October 2015 amid a transition away from infotainment programming (it was the only TWC program to be produced primarily outside of Atlanta), with the timeslot filled by an extension of AMHQ.

Entertainment channels such as VH1 and E! have also aired morning shows (such as Big Morning Buzz Live and That Morning Show, and the 2020 version of E! News). Sports channels sometimes carry morning shows (such as ESPN's Get Up and First Take, and NFL Network's Good Morning Football), with a focus on news and discussions (including recaps of the previous day's events), and interviews with sports figures.

=== United Kingdom ===
In the United Kingdom, breakfast television typically runs from 6:00 a.m. to between 9:00 a.m. and 10:00 a.m.

Television broadcasting hours in the United Kingdom until early 1972 were tightly regulated and controlled by the British government under the control of the Postmaster-General. Restrictions were placed on how many hours per day could be used by licensees for television broadcasts. By the mid-1960s, this was allocated at seven hours per day (Monday through Fridays) and 7.5 hours per day (Saturdays and Sundays), thus providing a 50-hour broadcasting limit per week. Certain programming was exempt from these restrictions (schools, adult education, religion, sport); however no time was allocated to breakfast television until the early 1970s.

In January 1972, under the then-Conservative government, the Minister for Posts and Telecommunications, Christopher Chataway, announced to the British parliament that all such restrictions would be lifted, and daily broadcasting hours could now be set by the individual broadcaster. By October 1972, both the BBC and ITV were providing daytime television programmes, with the commercially licensed ITV taking full advantage of the relaxed broadcasting hours. However, due to financial issues and the economic problems of the 1970s, breakfast television was not considered until later in the decade.

After a nine-week trial in 1977 on the regional television stations Yorkshire Television and Tyne Tees Television, the Independent Broadcasting Authority (which oversaw all ITV licensees) considered breakfast television so important that it created an entire franchise for the genre, becoming the only national independent television franchise. At the end of 1980, this franchise was awarded to TV-am. Initially planned for launch in 1982, it was delayed until the start of 1983 so that it did not take any oxygen from the launch of the UK's fourth channel. This allowed BBC1 to launch its own morning programme first on 17 January 1983, Breakfast Time. TV-am, with Good Morning Britain as its flagship programme, launched just over two weeks later. on 1 February. TV-am struggled at first because of a format that was considered to be stodgy and formal compared to the more relaxed magazine style of the BBC's Breakfast Time, and a reliance on advertising income from a timeslot when people were not accustomed to watching television. However, it eventually flourished, only to lose its licence at the end of 1992, after being outbid by GMTV.

Breakfast television appeared on Channel 4 in April 1989 when it launched The Channel Four Daily, which was conceived as a television "newspaper" with a collection of various short-form news and thematic segments. In 1992, after failing to attract an audience, Channel 4 replaced it with The Big Breakfast — a informal, morning zoo-like show presented from studios constructed in an actual house. The new format proved to be much more successful. 1989 also saw BBC2 launch a breakfast service: its news-based offering was launched to allow the BBC to provide a daily report on events at Westminster and was supplemented by teletext news pages from Ceefax and a 15-minute simulcast of BBC Breakfast News.

In 2010, ITV plc, which by then owned 75% of GMTV, gained full control of the station after it acquired the remaining 25% stake held by The Walt Disney Company. In September 2010, the full legal name of the licensing company was changed from "GMTV Limited" to "ITV Breakfast Limited", with GMTV closing on 3 September and Daybreak and Lorraine launching on 6 September 2010. ITV had big difficulties with the slot as well; Daybreak was eventually cancelled in 2014 due to low ratings, and was replaced by Good Morning Britain on 28 April 2014. The series continues to trail BBC Breakfast consistently, and has marketed with the traditional Today format mixed with political debates. One of the co-hosts was Piers Morgan, until his departure in 2021, and the programme used his notoriety as a marketing point, to middling success. In 2026, production of Good Morning Britain was transferred from ITV Breakfast Limited to ITN, and was integrated with ITV News.

The regional variations of BBC One and ITV1, the only terrestrial networks that provide localized news bulletins, do not air local breakfast television programmes, though abbreviated regional news opt-outs are provided each half-hour during BBC Breakfast and Good Morning Britain. Outside of these short bulletins, local breakfast programmes in the vein of those broadcast in North America were largely nonexistent in the UK for most of the history of British television. From 2007 to 2009, now-defunct local channel Channel M, which served Greater Manchester, broadcast a three-hour breakfast programme called Channel M Breakfast; it was cancelled in May 2009, amid significant local programming and staffing cutbacks at the station. Several local television channels launched during the 2010s as part of then-culture secretary Jeremy Hunt's Local Digital Television Programme, particularly those owned by Local TV Limited, broadcast two hours of local news at breakfast as part of their news and public affairs programming remits.

Since its launch in 2021, news channel GB News has aired a breakfast show called The Great British Breakfast. It was originally anchored by three presenters in the style of Fox & Friends, but soon shifted to a two-anchor format.

== List of morning television shows ==
The following is a country-ordered list of breakfast television and morning show programs, past and present, with indication of a program's producing network or channel:

=== Albania ===
Programme	Network
7 pa 5	Vizion Plus
ABC-ja e Mëngjesit	ABC News
Aldo Morning Show	TV Klan
Dita Jonë	A2 CNN
Good Morning Albania	Euronews Albania
Koha Për t'u Zgjuar	News 24
Mirëmëngjes Shqipëri	RTSH 1 RTSH 24
Wake Up	Top Channel

=== Argentina ===
Programme	Network
+ Mañana	La Nación +
8 AM	Canal 26
A Las 7	Argentina/12
A La Barbarossa	Telefe
Andando	Channel 8 – Córdoba
Arriba Argentinos	El Trece
Cada Dia	Channel 13 – Rosario
Buenos Días, América	América TV
Buen Día Nación	La Nación +
De 7 a 10	Todo Noticias
Desayuno	Canal Siete
El Show de la Mañana	Córdoba
La Primeras	Crónica TV
Mañanas Argentinas	Canal 5 Noticias
Otra Mañana	América 24
Primeras Noticias	Canal 26
Telenueve al Amanecer	El Nueve
Tiempo Real	Crónica TV
Todo lo que Pasa	Telefe – Santa Fe

=== Australia ===
==== Current ====
Programme	Run	Network
News Breakfast	2008–present	ABC TV and ABC News
First Edition	2002–present	News24
Get Cereal	1994–present	C31 Melbourne
The Morning Show	2007–present	Seven Network
Sunrise	1991–present	Seven Network
Sports First	2013–present	FOX Sports News
The Open	2020–present	Ausbiz TV
Today	1982–present	Nine Network
Today Extra	2012–present	Nine Network
Weekend Breakfast	2012–present	ABC News
Weekend Sunrise	2005–present	Seven Network
Weekend Today	2009–present	Nine Network

==== Former ====
Programme	Run	Network
9am with David & Kim	2006–2009	Network 10
The Big Breakfast	1992–1995	Network 10
Breakfast	2012	Network 10
Business Breakfast	2001–2002	ABC1
The Circle	2010–2012	Network 10
First Edition	1993–1996	ABC1
First Business	2008–2018	Sky News Business Channel
Good Morning Australia	1981–1992	Network 10
Good Morning Australia	1993–2005	Network 10
Good Morning Melbourne	1981–1988	Network 10
Good Morning Sydney	1978–1989	Network 10
Kerri-Anne	2002–2011	Nine Network
Studio 10	2013–2023	Network 10
Sunday	1981–2008	Nine Network
The Open	2018–2019	Your Money
Til Ten	1989–1991	Network 10
Wake Up	2013–2014	Network 10
Wake Up! WA	2005–2008	Access 31

=== Austria ===
==== Current ====
Programme	Run	Network
Café Puls	2004–present	Puls 4
Café Puls	2005–present	ProSieben Austria
Café Puls	2005–present	Sat.1 Österreich
Café Puls	2019–present	Puls 24
Die Morgen Show	2016–present	OE24.TV
Guten Morgen Österreich	2016–present	ORF 2
Guten Morgen Wien	2012–present	W24

==== Former ====
Programme	Run	Network
Café Puls	2005–2007	Kabel eins Austria
Guten Morgen mit W24	2011–2012	W24
Servus am Morgen	2013–2017	Servus TV

=== Azerbaijan ===
==== Former ====
Programme	Network
Yeni Səhər	Lider TV

=== Belgium ===
==== Current ====
Program	Network	Language	Notes
Goeiemorgen Morgen!	VRT Canvas	Dutch	A visual simulcast of Radio 2 breakfast programme
Sven & Anke op Joe	VTM Gold	Dutch	A visual simulcast of JOE breakfast programme
Maarten & Dorothee op QMusic	QMusic TV	Dutch	A visual simulcast of QMusic breakfast programme
Sta Op! met Véronique De Kock	Play	Dutch	A visual simulcast of Nostalgie breakfast programme
Le 6/8	La Une	French	A visual simulcast of VivaCité breakfast programme
Le 8/9	La Une	French	A visual simulcast of VivaCité breakfast programme
Le Réveil De Tipik	Tipik; TipikVision	French	A visual simulcast of Tipik Radio's breakfast programme
Matin Première	La Trois	French	A visual simulcast of La Première's breakfast programme
Bel RTL Matin	RTL TVI	French	A visual simulcast of Bel RTL breakfast programme
Le Good Morning	RTL Plug; Radio Contact Vision	French	A visual simulcast of Radio Contact breakfast programme
Le 6/9	AB3	French	A visual simulcast of NRJ breakfast programme

==== Former ====
Programme	Network	Language
Goeiemorgen	VTM	Dutch
Goeiemorgen Vlaanderen	VTM	Dutch
Team Octhend	Play4	Dutch
Michaël, Julie & Josefien op NRJ	Play6	Dutch

=== Bosnia and Herzegovina ===
Programme	Network
Jutro za sve	BHT 1
Dobro jutro svima	Hayat TV
Sarajevsko jutro	TVSA

=== Brazil ===
Programme	Run	Network	Notes
Bora Brasil (C'mon Brazil)	2020–present	Band	Each station also produces its own local version, before the national version exibithion.
BandNews Hoje (BandNews Today)	2026–present	BandNews TV	
Jornal Gente (People Journal)	2026–present	BandNews TV	
Resumo BandNews – Edição de Manhã (BandNews Resume –Morning Edition)	2026–present	BandNews TV	
Manhã BandNews (BandNews Morning)	2004–present	BandNews TV	
Hora Um da Notícia (Hour One in News)	2014–present	TV Globo	
Bom Dia Brasil (Good Morning Brazil)	1983–present	TV Globo	Each station also produces its own local version, before the national version exhibition.
Mais Você (More You)	2000–present	TV Globo	
Encontro com Patrícia Poeta (Meeting with Patrícia Poeta)	2012–present	TV Globo	
Bom Dia Sábado (Good Morning Saturday)	2025–present	TV Globo	National edition only on Saturdays.
É de Casa (From the House)	2015–present	TV Globo	Only on Saturdays.
GloboNews Em Ponto (GloboNews O'Clock)	2018–present	GloboNews	
GloboNews Radar	2026–present	GloboNews	
Balanço Geral Manhã (General Balance - Morning)	2015–present	Record/Record News	Each station produces its own local version.
Hoje em Dia (Today)	2005–present	Record	Inspired by Good Morning America and Today. Preceded by Note e Anote (1991 - 2005)
Fala Brasil (What's Up, Brazil)	1998–present	Record	
Você Bonita (You Beautiful)	2010–present	TV Gazeta	
Primeiro Impacto (First Impact)	2016–present	SBT	Based on Primer Impacto. Preceded by SBT Manhã (2005 - 2014; 2025 - 2026) and Notícias da Manhã (2014 - 2015)
Se Liga, Brasil (Check This Out, Brazil)	2026–present	SBT	
News Primeira Edição (News First Edition)	2025–present	SBT News	
News Manhã (Morning News)	2025–present	SBT News	
Manhã do Ronnie (Ronnie's Morning)	2022–present	RedeTV!	
Vou te Contar (I'm Gonna Tell You)	2020–present	RedeTV!	
CNN Novo Dia (CNN New Day)	2020–present	CNN Brasil	Based on New Day
Live CNN	2020–present	CNN Brasil	
Jornal da Manhã (Morning News)	2021–present	TV Jovem Pan/Jovem Pan News	
Morning Show	2021–present	TV Jovem Pan/Jovem Pan News	
BM&C Pre-Market	2020–present	BM&C News	
Morning Call	2024–present	CNN Brasil Money	
Abertura de Mercado (Markets Opening)	2024–present	CNN Brasil Money	
Agora (Now)	2024–present	Times Brasil	
Real Time	2024–present	Times Brasil	

=== Brunei ===
Programme	Network
Rampai Pagi (رامڤأي ڤاڬي, Morning Melody)	RTB Perdana; RTB Sukmaindera

=== Bulgaria ===
Programme	Run	Network	Notes
Денят започва (The Day Begins)	2000–present	BNT 1	Weekdays
Денят започва с Георги Любенов (The Day Begins With Georgi Lyubenov)	2012–present	BNT 1	Weekends
Тази сутрин (This Morning)	2000–present	bTV	Weekdays
Тази събота/неделя (This Saturday/Sunday)	2010–present	bTV	Branded as This Saturday on Saturday and This Sunday on Sunday
Здравей, България (Hello Bulgaria)	2000–present	NOVA	Weekdays
Събуди се (Wake Up)	2012–present	NOVA	Weekends
Твоят ден (Your Day)	2021–present	NOVA News	Weekdays
България сутрин (Bulgaria Morning)	2011–present	Bulgaria On Air	Weekdays
Добро утро, Европа (Good Morning, Europe)	2022–present	Euronews Bulgaria	Weekdays and Weekends
Бизнес старт (Business Start)	2015-present	Bloomberg TV Bulgaria	Weekdays

=== Canada ===
==== Current ====
Program	Run	Network	Notes
Breakfast Television	1989–present	Citytv stations (except Citytv Saskatchewan, Winnipeg, Edmonton and Montreal)	Each station produces its own local edition of Breakfast Television; previously seen on A Atlantic in Halifax, Nova Scotia; CHMI-DT/Winnipeg, Manitoba, CKEM-DT/Edmonton, Alberta and CJNT-DT/Montreal, Quebec
CBC News: Morning	2012–present	CBC News Network	
CP24 Breakfast	2009–present	CP24	
Morning Live/Morning Live First Edition	2001–present	CHCH-DT/Hamilton, Ontario	
Global News Morning	199?–present	Global stations	
The Morning Show	2011–present	CIII-DT/Toronto	Airs nationally across Global Television Network stations
Salut, Bonjour!	1988–present	TVA	
Le Québec Matin		LCN	
Your Morning	2016–present	CTV and CTV 2 stations	Carried on CTV owned-and-operated stations from Manitoba westward, as well as CHRO-TV/Ottawa and CTV 2 Atlantic and also on CTV News Channel
Power Breakfast		BNN Bloomberg	
Sports 30 (Matin)		RDS Info	
À la une		Ici RDI	
Première ligne		Ici RDI	
D'abord L'Info		Ici RDI	

==== Global morning newscasts ====
All Global stations, with the exceptions of Global Okanagan and Global Lethbridge, air their own local morning shows titled Global News Morning. In May 2015, Global made changes to their Morning News programs east of Alberta; instead of the entire show being anchored locally, 16 minutes of each hour is anchored in Toronto for national and international news stories. Each Morning News program starts at 6 a.m. and ends at 9 a.m., with the exception of Global BC, Global Calgary, and Global Edmonton, which start their broadcasts at 5 a.m.. These three stations also air weekend editions of Morning News which start at 7 a.m. and end at 10 a.m. on Saturdays and Sundays. In 2013, Global Toronto's The Morning Show was extended by half an hour. The additional half-hour is broadcast on every Global station at 9 a.m..

==== Local CBC newscasts ====
Instead of a morning show, most stations air a broadcast of the CBC Radio morning shows from their corresponding radio station, other stations may air the CBC News broadcast

This is followed by a broadcast of the CBC Kids block and then CBC News at 12 p.m. local time

==== Former ====
Programme	Run	Network	Notes
2 Laits, un Sucre	2008–2009	TQS	Programme formerly titled Caféine
Bon Matin	1994–1998	Radio-Canada	
Canada AM	1972–2016	CTV	
CBC News: Morning		CBC Television; CBC News Network	
Good Morning Canada	2001–2009	CTV	Aired weekends
Matin Express	1998–2006	Radio-Canada	
Le show du matin	2010–2011	V	
SRC Bonjour	1987–1994	Radio-Canada	
Le Téléjournal/Matin	2006–????	Ici Radio-Canada Télé (2006–2007); Ici RDI	
RDI Matin	2006–2022	Ici RDI	

=== Chile ===
==== Current ====
Programme	Run	Network
Tu día	2021–present	Canal 13
Buenos días a todos	1992–present	TVN
CNN AM	2008–present	CNN Chile
Contigo en la mañana	2019–present	Chilevisión
La Mañana Informativa	2009–present	Canal 24 Horas
Mucho Gusto	2001–present	Mega
3x3	2023–present	T13 en vivo

Several regional morning shows also exist on Chilean television.

==== Former ====
Programme	Run	Network
A las 11	2012–2015	Telecanal
Cocinados	2007–2008	Telecanal
Gente Como Tú	2008–2012	Chilevisión
La mañana del 13	1999–2002	Canal 13
Mañaneros	2011–2016	La Red
Pollo en Conserva	2004–2011	La Red
Viva la mañana	2002–2006, 2009–2010	Canal 13
Teleonce al Despertar	1980–1991	Chilevisión
Matinal '91–'92–'93	1991–1993	Chilevisión
La Mañana Diferente	1994	Chilevisión
Tenga Usted un Muy Buen Día	1982	TVN
Juntos	2006–2008	Canal 13
Bienvenidos	2011-2021	Canal 13
Hola Chile	2016–2022	La Red

=== China ===
Programme	Network
Morning News (Chinese: 朝闻天下)	CCTV-1 and CCTV-13
First Look / First Time (Chinese: 第一时间)	CCTV-2
Morning (Chinese: 看东方)	Dragon TV
Good Morning Beijing (Chinese: 北京您早)	BTV
Morning Shandong (Chinese: 早安山东)	Shandong TV
Super News (Anhui) (Chinese: 超级新闻场)	Anhui TV
Morning Short-Cut / Jinchen Report (Chinese: 津晨播报)	Tianjin TV
First Look / First Time (Chinese: 第一时间)	Liaoning TV
Morning Report (Chinese: 新闻早报)	Jilin TV
Good Morning Fujian (Chinese: 早安福建)	Fujian TV
Good Morning Beijing-Tianjin-Hebei (Chinese: 你早京津冀)	Hebei TV
Gong Du Chen Guang / (Let's) spend the morning together (Chinese: 共度晨光)	Heilongjiang TV
Chen Guang Xin Shi Jie / New Vision This Morning (Chinese: 晨光新视界)	Jiangxi TV
Hui Shuo Tian Xia (Chinese: 汇说天下)	Sichuan TV
Chongqing Live (Chinese: 直播重庆)	Chongqing TV
Phoenix Morning Express (Chinese: 凤凰早班车)	Phoenix Chinese Channel and Phoenix InfoNews Channel

=== Colombia ===
==== Current ====
Programme	Network
6 AM de Caracol Radio	Canal 1
Arriba Bogotá	Citytv
Día a Día	Caracol Televisión
Buen día, Colombia	Canal RCN
Cablenoticias en la Mañana	Cablenoticias
La Mañana	NTN24
Señal de la Mañana	Señal Colombia

==== Former ====
Programme	Run	Network
En las mañanas con Uno	2014-2017	Canal 1
Señal en la Mañana	2024	Canal Institucional
Muy Buenos Días	2002-2018	Canal RCN
El Desayuno	2018-2020	Canal RCN

=== Costa Rica ===
Programme	Network	Production company
Buen Día	Teletica	Teletica
Giros	Repretel 6	Repretel
La Revista	Canal 8	Multimedios
Café Nacional	Canal Trece	SINART

=== Croatia ===
Programme	Run	Network
Dobro jutro, Hrvatska	1992–present	HRT 1

=== Czech Republic ===
Programme	Run	Network
Dobré Ráno	1998–present	ČT2
Nový Den	2020–present	Prima TV; CNN Prima NEWS
Snídaně s Novou	1994–present	TV Nova
Studio 6	1993–1998, 2008–present	ČT1; ČT24

=== Denmark ===
==== Current ====
Programme	Run	Network
Go' Morgen Danmark	1996–present	TV 2
Morgennyhederne på News	2006–present	TV 2 News
Sportsmorgen	2025–present	Viaplay Sport News
TVA 07.00	2021–present	DR1; TVA Live

==== Former ====
Programme	Run	Network
Morgenflimmer	1984–1991	Kanal 2
DR Morgen	2001–2005	DR1
DR2 Morgen	2013–2017	DR2
Vågn op med The Voice	2010–2012	Kanal 5 and The Voice

=== Egypt ===
Programme	Network
Sabah El Kheir ya Masr (صباح الخير يا مصر)	Channel 1

=== Estonia ===
Programme	Run	Network
Terevisioon	2001–present	ETV
Telehommik	2024–present	Kanal 2
Kofe+	2020–present	ETV+

=== European ===
==== Current ====
Programme	Run	Network
Bloomberg Daybreak: Europe	2016–present	Bloomberg EMEA
Bloomberg Markets: European Open	2016–present	Bloomberg EMEA
CNN Newsroom	2009–present	CNN International EMEA
Squawk Box Europe	1999–present	CNBC Europe
Wake Up Europe	2023–present	Euronews

==== Former ====
Programme	Run	Network
Good Morning Europe	2018–2023	Euronews

=== Finland ===
==== Current ====
Programme	Network
Huomenta Suomi	MTV3
Ylen aamu	YLE TV1

==== Former ====
Programme	Network
Heräämö	The Voice (also on TV Viisi and The Voice radio station)
Min morgon	YLE Fem
Uutisaamu	MTV3

=== Fiji ===
Programme	Network
Breakfast at Fiji One	Fiji One

=== France ===
==== Current ====
Programme	Run	Network
Apolline Matin	2022–present	RMC Story
BFM Première	2025–present	BFM TV
Bonjour ! La Matinale TF1	2024–present	TF1
Good Morning Business	2010–present	BFM Business; RMC Life
Ici Matin	2023–present	France 3
La Matinale CNews	2016–present	CNews
La Matinale Info	2016–present	France Info
La Matinale Infosport+	2019–present	Infosport+ Canal+ Sport 360
La Matinale LCI	2025–present	LCI
La Matinale Week-end	2025–present	LCI
Le 6h00 Info	2016–present	France 2
RMC Le Morning 5/7	2025–present	RMC Story
Télématin	1985–present	France 2

==== Former ====
Programme	Run	Network
Le 7/9	1984–1985	Canal+
Bonjour la France	1984–1987	TF1
Bonjour la France, bonjour l'Europe	1987–1990	TF1
C'est pas trop tôt !	2003–2005	M6
Drôle de réveil !	2008–2009	M6
La Matinale Canal+	2004–2013	Canal+
Morning Café	2005–2008	M6
Morning Fun	1998–2000	Fun TV
LCI Matin	2005–2023	LCI
Le 6/9	2023–2025	LCI
Le Morning Live	2000–2003	M6
Le Toussaint Live	2023	BFM TV
Les Matin LCI Week-end	2023–2025	LCI
Première Edition	2007–2025	BFM TV
Team Toussaint, la matinale info	2013–2016	iTELE

=== Georgia ===
==== Current ====
Programme	Network
Dila Mshvidobisa, Saqartvelo!	Rustavi 2
Dilis Palitra	Palitra News
Gaighvidze Saqartvelo	Formula TV
Imedis Dila	Imedi TV
Sheni Dila	Mtavari Arkhi

==== Former ====
Programme	Network
Akhali Dghe	First Channel

=== Germany ===
==== Current ====
Programme	Run	Network	Notes
#MoinMoin	2015–present	Rocket Beans TV	broadcast on Internet television
Deutschland am Morgen	2026–present	RTL/n-tv	Preceded by Guten Morgen Deutschland (1987–1994 & 2013–2022), Punkt 6 (1997–2013 & 2022–2026), Punkt 7 (1994–1997 & 2022–2026), Punkt 8 (2022–2026) and Punkt 9 (2000–2013)
Die Welt am Morgen	2021–present	Welt	
Frühcafé	1995–present	Hamburg 1	broadcast on Regional television (Hamburg)
Frühstücksfernsehen LIVE	2006–present	BW Future TV	broadcast on Regional television (Heilbronn)
Guten Morgen Berlin	2025–present	RBB Fernsehen	A visual simulcast of RBB 88.8 breakfast programme
Guten Morgen Brandenburg	2025–present	RBB Fernsehen	A visual simulcast of RBB Antenne Brandenburg breakfast programme
Guten Morgen Fans!	2020–present	Sky Sport News	
Morgenmagazin	1992–present	Das Erste/ZDF	Simulcast, weekly alternating versions produced by either Das Erste/ARD's affiliate WDR or ZDF, the two main public broadcasters
Sat.1-Frühstücksfernsehen	1987–present	Sat.1	Formerly titled Guten Morgen mit Sat.1 (1987–1993) and Deutschland Heute Morgen (1993–1999)
SWR3 Morningshow	2025–present	SWR Fernsehen	A visual simulcast of SWR3 breakfast programme

==== Former ====
Programme	Run	Network	Notes
Die ProSieben MorningShow	1999	ProSieben	a comedy- and infotainmentshow
Frühcafé	2008–2013	tv.berlin	broadcast on Regional television (Berlin)
Frühstücksfernsehen	1988–1992	RIAS-TV	broadcast for West Berlin and East Germany (see Rundfunk im amerikanischen Sektor)
Guten Morgen Deutschland	1987–1994 & 2013–2022	RTL	Followed by Punkt 7 (1994–1997) and preceded by Punkt 6 (1997–2013 & 2022–2026) and Punkt 8 (2022–2026) together with Punkt 9 (2000–2013)
Guten Morgen, Internet!	2016–2019	funk	broadcast on Internet television
Guten Morgen NRW	2005–2010	NRW.TV	broadcast on Regional television (North Rhine-Westphalia)
Punkt 6	1997–2013 & 2022–2026	RTL	Preceded by Guten Morgen Deutschland (1987–1994 & 2013–2022) and followed by Punkt 7 (1994–1997 & 2022–2026)
Punkt 7	1994–1997 & 2022–2026	RTL	Preceded by Guten Morgen Deutschland (1987–1994 & 2013–2022) and followed by Punkt 6 (1997–2013 & 2022–2026) and followed by Punkt 8 (2022–2026)
Punkt 8	2022–2026	RTL	Preceded by Guten Morgen Deutschland (1987–1994 & 2013–2022) & Punkt 9 (2000–2013) and followed by Punkt 7 (1997–2013 & 2022–2026)
Servus am Morgen	2013–2015	Servus TV	co-broadcast with Austria's Servus am Morgen
Weck Up	1998–2014	Sat.1	Aired on Sundays only.

=== Greece ===
==== Current ====
Programme	Run	Network
Sk Apo Tis Pente 5	2025–present	ERT1; ERT News
From 6 a.m.	2021–present	ERT1
Kalimera Ellada	1992–2011, 2015–present	ANT1
To Proino	2013–present	ANT1
Happy Day	2014–present	Alpha
Weekend	2017–present	Alpha
Mega Kalimera	2021–present	Mega
Mega Savvatokiriako	2005–present	Mega
Poios einai Proiniatika?	2021–present	Open
Open Weekend	2021–present	Open
Kalimera	2006–present	Skai
Breakfast @ Star	2021–present	Star

==== Former ====
Programme	Run	Network
Proino ANT1	2011–2015	ANT1
ERT News at 5	2021–2025	ERT1; ERT News

=== Hong Kong ===
==== Current ====
Programme	Run	Network
Good Morning Hong Kong (Chinese: 香港早晨)	1981–present	TVB Jade
Morning Cable (Chinese: Cable早晨)	2001–present	HOY 77 & HOY 78
Morning Now (Chinese: Now早晨)	2006–present (Now TV) 2016–present (ViuTV)	Now TV & ViuTV
This Morning (Chinese: 晨早新聞天地)	2016–present	RTHK TV 31 & RTHK TV 32

==== Former ====
Programme	Run	Network
Good Morning Asia (Chinese: 亞洲早晨)	1976–2014	ATV Home

=== Hungary ===
==== Current ====
Programme	Run	Network
ATV START	2011–	ATV
Ma reggel (This Morning)	2009–	M1
Mokka	2004–	TV2
Reggeli (Breakfast)	1998–2011, 2017–	RTL

==== Former ====
Programme	Run	Network
8:08 – Minden reggel (8:08 – Every morning)	2013–2016	RTL Klub
A Reggel (The Morning)	1991–1993	M1
Jó reggelt, Magyarország! (Good Morning, Hungary!)	1997–2004	TV2
Napkelte (Sunrise)	1991–1993, 2002–2009	M2
Napkelte (Sunrise)	1993–1999, 2002–2009	M1
Napkelte (Sunrise)	1999–2000	TV3
Napkelte (Sunrise)	2000–2002	Magyar ATV
Ma reggel (This Morning)	2009–2012	M2
Reggel a Dunán (Morning on Danube)	1992−2010	Duna TV
Reggeli Jam (Breakfast Jam)	2008–2011	ATV
Szabadság tér	1999–2000	M1
Naprakész (Timely)	2000–2002	M1
Reggeli Járat (Breakfast Line)	2003–2007, 2015–2018	Hír TV
Jó reggelt! (Good Morning!)	2018–2019	Echo TV

=== Iceland ===
Programme	Run	Network
Ísland í Bítið	2004–????	Stöð 2 and radio station Bylgjan
Zúúber	2004–????	skífan TV (also aired on radio station FM 957)

=== India ===
Programme	Network
8 AM Express	CNN-News18
DD Morning Show	DD National
Bazaar Morning Call	CNBC-TV18
Breakfast News	NDTV India
Namaste India	Zee News
News18 Headstart	CNN-News18
Pehla Sauda	CNBC Awaaz
Power Breakfast	Zee Business
Tea Toast & Sports	NDTV India
The Morning News	CNN-News18

=== Indonesia ===
Most of these programs are the morning edition of its respective flagship news program, and hard news in format. Some of them, especially the news-oriented network, has two morning news programmes – while the first are the hard news, the latter are the talk show format.

==== Current ====
Programme	Network
Apa Kabar Indonesia Pagi	tvOne
Berita Pagi	TVRI
BeritaSatu Pagi	BTV, BeritaSatu
Buletin iNews Pagi	GTV
CNN Indonesia Good Morning	CNN Indonesia, Trans TV
CNN Indonesia New Day	CNN Indonesia
CNN Indonesia Today	CNN Indonesia
Editorial Media Indonesia	Metro TV
Ekonomi 8	Garuda TV
Fakta +62	MDTV
Fokus Pagi	Indosiar
iNews Pagi	iNews
iNews Room Pagi	iNews
iNews Today	iNews
Jendela Negeri	TVRI
Kabar Pagi	tvOne
Kompas Pagi	Kompas TV
Lapor Polisi	iNews
Laporan 8 Pagi	Garuda TV
Liputan 6 Pagi	SCTV
Liputan 6 Pagi Moji	Moji
Market Buzz	IDX Channel
Menyapa Indonesia Pagi	Sin Po TV
Morning Update	iNews
Ngopi (Ngobrol Penuh Inspirasi)	TVRI Sumut
NTV Morning	NTV
Nusantara Economic Updates	NTV
Pagi Pagi Seru	tvOne
Profit	CNBC Indonesia
Redaksi Pagi	CNN Indonesia, Trans7
Sapa Indonesia Pagi	Kompas TV
Selamat Pagi Indonesia	Metro TV
Seputar iNews	RCTI
Sindo Today	Sindonews TV
Squawk Box Indonesia	CNBC Indonesia
Starting Point	TVRI World
Zona Bisnis	Metro TV

==== Former ====
Programme	Run	Network
2 Jam Saja	1999–2001	TVRI
8-11 Show	2010–2015	Metro TV
A.M. Booster	2020–2023	MYTV
Berita Lativi Pagi	2003–2004	Lativi
Bincang Pagi	2004, 2013–2014	Metro TV
Bercanda Pagi	2022	Trans7
Buka Mata	2004–2005	Trans TV
Caca Marica	2021–2022	RTV
Cakrawala	2023–2024	ANTV
Global Pagi	2005–2006, 2008–2009	Global TV
Good Morning	2005–2008	Trans TV
Good Morning Jakarta	2019–2022	BeritaSatu
Halaman Depan	2002–2003	Trans TV
Halo Indonesia	1995–2002	ANTV
Indonesiaku	1980–1990	TVRI
Indonesia Morning Show	2013–2019	NET.
Indonesia This Morning	2006–2010	Metro TV
InLine	2021	Trans7
Inspirasi Pagi	2004–2005	TV7
Investor Opening Market	2023–2025	BeritaSatu
Jawa Pos Update	2023–2025	Jawa Pos TV
Jendela Pagi	2003–2004	TV7
Jurnal ANTV Pagi	2003–2006	ANTV
Klik Indonesia Pagi	2020–2026	TVRI
Lensa Indonesia Pagi	2014–2024	RTV
Lintas Pagi	2006–2017	TPI (2006–2010); MNCTV (2010–2017)
Lintas iNews Pagi	2017–2025	MNCTV
Loka 10	2025–2026	Loka TV
Matahari	2003–2004	Trans TV
Metro Pagi	2001–2017	Metro TV
Metro Pagi Primetime	2017–2026	Metro TV
Metro This Morning	2000–2005	Metro TV
Morning Call Selamat Pagi	2020–2023	MYTV
NET. 5	2013–2018	NET.
NET. 10	2013–2018	NET.
New Power Breakfast	late 2010s–c. 2021	IDX Channel
Nuansa Pagi	1993–2009	RCTI
Nusantara Kini Pagi	2015–2020	Jawa Pos TV
Obrolan Pagi	2023–2024	BTV
Panorama Pagi	2006–2007	SCTV
Power Breakfast	2010–2015	MNC Business
SEA Morning Show	2020–2025	SEA Today
Salam Pagi	2014–2015	Sindo TV
Santapan Pagi	2001–2002	Trans TV
Selamat Datang Pagi	2001–2004	RCTI
Selamat Pagi	2007–2018	Trans7
Selamat Pagi Indonesia	1994–2006	TPI
Selamat Pagi Nusantara	2010–2011	TVRI
Selamat Pagi Nusantara	2017–2018	ANTV
Semangat Pagi Nusantara	2014–2015	TVRI
Semangat Pagi Indonesia	2015–2020	TVRI
Seputar Indonesia Pagi	2009–2017	RCTI
Seputar iNews Pagi	2017–2025	RCTI
Sindo Morning Show	2023	Sindonews TV
Spirit Bisnis	2013–2015	Bloomberg TV Indonesia
Topik Pagi	2006–2017	ANTV
Warta Pagi	2008–2012	TVRI

=== Iran ===
==== Current ====
Programme	Run	Network
Sobh-e-Khabar (صبح بخیر ایران)	1994–present	IRIB TV1

==== Former ====
Programme	Run	Network
Hala Khorshid	2017–2019	IRIB TV3

=== Iraq ===
Programme	Network
Sabah Alrabiaa (صباح الرابعة)	Alrabiaa Network Television
Al-Baghdadia Wa El Nas (البغدادية والناس)	Al-Baghdadia
Naharkum Succar (نهاركم سكر)	Al Sumaria

=== Ireland ===
==== Current ====
Programme	Run	Network	Notes
Ireland AM	1999–present	Virgin Media One	Ireland's 1st and only dedicated TV breakfast show
Morning Ireland	2009–present	RTÉ News	A visual simulcast of RTÉ Radio 1's breakfast programme

=== Israel ===
==== Current ====
Programme	Run	Network
HaOlam HaBoker (The World This Morning)	2006–present	Reshet; Channel 13
Yom Hadash (A New Day)	2006–present	Keshet; Channel 12

==== Former ====
Programme	Run	Network
Boker Tov Yisrael (Good Morning Israel)	1990–2003	Channel 1
Reshet Al HaBoker (Reshet on the Morning)	1996–2006	Reshet; Channel 2
Telad Coffee (Café Telad)	1997–2005	Telad; Channel 2
Tohnit HaBoker (The Morning Show)	1996–2006	Keshet; Channel 2
Kol Boker (Every Morning)	2004–2019	Channel 10

=== Italy ===
==== Current ====
Programme	Run	Network
TG2 Mattina	2019–present	Rai 2
TG4 Ultim'ora (morning edition)	1991–present	Rete 4
TG5 Prima Pagina	1991–present	Canale 5
TG5 Mattina	1997–present	Canale 5
Omnibus	2002–present	La7
Mattino Cinque	2008–present	Canale 5
Mattino Cinque News	2020–present	Canale 5
Morning News	2021–present	Canale 5
Edizioni Mattutine	2011–present	TGCOM24
Sky TG24 Buongiorno	2019–present	Sky TG24
Buongiorno Sky Sport 24	2019–present	Sky Sport 24
UnoMattina	1986–present	Rai 1
UnoMattina in Famiglia	1989–present	Rai 1
UnoMattina Weekly	2022–present	Rai 1
UnoMattina News	2025–present	Rai 1
Agorà	2010–present	Rai 3
Buongiorno Italia	2010–present	Rai 3
Buongiorno Regione	2009–present	Rai 3
Mattina 24	2022–present	Rai News 24
TG Sport 6.30	2017–present	Rai Sport
Good Morning Radio2	2026–present	Rai Radio 2 Visual
Tutto esaurito	2021–present	Radio 105 TV
La banda di R101	2021–present	R101 TV
Morning Glory	2021–present	Virgin Radio TV
Bonjour Bonjour	2021–present	Radio Monte Carlo TV

==== Former ====
Programme	Run	Network
Mattina 2	1990–1992	Rai 2
TG3 Mattino	1994–1999	Rai 3
TG4 Mattina	1991–1994	Rete 4
Buongiorno Italia	1980–1981; 1984–1987	Canale 5
Edizioni del mattino	1999–2022	Rai News 24
Sky TG24 Mattina	2004–2019	Sky TG24
Sky Sport 24 Mattina	2008–2019	Sky Sport 24
Buongiorno Cielo	2011–2012	Cielo
Ogni Mattina	2020–2021	TV8
Viva Rai2!	2022–2024	Rai 2
TG1 Mattina	2022–2025	Rai 1
Mattino 4	2024–2025	Rete 4
Ovunque6	2024–2026	Rai Radio 2 Visual

=== Japan ===
Programme	Network
ABEMA MORNING (Japanese: アベマモーニング)	Abema News
Asaichi (Japanese: あさイチ)	NHK G
Early Morning News (Japanese: アーリーモーニングニュース)	NTV News 24
Good! Morning (Japanese: グッド!モーニング)	TV Asahi
Mezamashi TV (Japanese: めざましテレビ)	Fuji TV
Morning News (Japanese: モーニングニュース)	NTV News 24
News Morning Satellite (Japanese: ニュースモーニングサテライト)	TV Tokyo
Good Morning, Japan (Japanese: NHKニュースおはよう日本)	NHK G
Oha! 4 News Live (Japanese: おは!よん ニュースライブ)	NTV News 24
Oha Suta (Japanese: おはスタ)	TV Tokyo
The Time, (Japanese: ザ・タイム)	TBS
Tokyo Morning Express (Japanese: 朝エクスプレス)	Nikkei CNBC
Wake Up News (Japanese: ウェークアップニュース)	TBS News
Wake Up • News (Japanese: ウェークアップ・ニュース)	NTV News 24
ZIP! (Japanese: ジップ!)	NTV

=== Kenya ===
Programme	Network
Good Morning Kenya	KBC
DayBreak	Citizen TV

=== Kosovo ===
Programme	Run	Network
Alarm	2021–present	ATV
Express Morning	2018–present	T7
Herët		Tëvë 1
Mëngjesi Me Arbenin	2020–present	Kanal 10
Mëngjesi Në Tribunë		Tribuna Channel
Mirëmengjesi Kosovë	2002–present	RTK 1
Ora Shtatë		Klan Kosova
Për Ditë Të Mbarë		RTV21
Sot		Kohavision
Zgjohu		RTV Dukagjini

=== Laos ===
Programme	Run	Network
Sabaidee Muang Lao	2006–present	Lao Star TV

=== Latvia ===
==== Current ====
Programme	Run	Network	Notes
900 sekundes	2004–present	TV3	Airs Monday-Fridays.
Rīts	2006–present	LTV1	Relaunched as Labrīt, Latvija! (2006–2013); relaunched as Rīta Panorāma (2013)

==== Former ====
Programme	Run	Network	Notes
LNT Brokastis	2014–2020	LNT	Airs weekends.

=== Lebanon ===
Programme	Network
Ahla Sabah (أحلى صباح)	Télé Liban

=== Lithuania ===
Programme	Network
Labas rytas, Lietuva	LRT TV

=== Luxembourg ===
Programme	Network	Notes
Den RTL Wecker mam Michelle Reiter & Dan Spogen	RTL Lëtzebuerg	A visual simulcast of RTL Radio Lëtzebuerg breakfast programme

=== Malaysia ===
==== Current ====
Programme	Run	Network	Notes
Apa Khabar Malaysia	2022–present	Bernama TV	
Assalamualaikum		TV Alhijrah	
Awani Pagi		Astro Awani	
Malaysia Hari Ini	1994–present	TV3	
Nasi Lemak Kopi O	2008–2018, 2024–now	TV9	
Selamat Pagi Malaysia	1985–present	TV1 (1985–present); Berita RTM (2018–present)	Formerly broadcasts only on weekends, particularly on Friday and Sunday, until 1 March 1994, when full-time morning broadcast started during that time. Also known as Selamat Pagi 1 Malaysia from 2010–2014.
Vizhuthugal (Tamil)		Astro Vaanavil; Astro Vinmeen	

==== Former ====
Programme	Run	Network	Notes
A.M live!	2016–2017	Astro Ria	
Bernama Today		Bernama TV	
Hot FM AM Krew on 8TV	2006–2016	8TV	Live video simulcast of Hot FM's breakfast show
8 Weekly (Chinese: 城市週看)	2013–2018	8TV	
The Breakfast Show	2006–2013	NTV7	Aired weekdays.
Feel Good Show	5 March 2018-28 December 2018	NTV7	Aired weekdays.
Good Morning Tai Tai (Chinese: 活力早晨)	2013–31 March 2016	NTV7	Replaced by CJ Wow Shop teleshopping block
Isu Kommentar	1998–1999	TV1	
Jendela Pagi	2000–2001	TV1	
Moving on 2	1996–2002	TV2	On Fridays and weekends.
Sekapur Sirih	1987–1994	TV3	On Sundays. Subsumed into Malaysia Hari Ini.
Seulas Pinang	1993–1994	TV3	On Fridays. Subsumed into Malaysia Hari Ini.
Borak Kopitiam	2018–2022	TV3	Aired on weekends (including Fridays) only

=== Malta ===
Programme	Network
La Qomna, Qomna	NET Television
ONE Breakfast	One
TVAM	TVM

=== Mexico ===
==== Current ====
Programme	Run	Network	Production company
Hoy	1998–present	Las Estrellas	Televisa
Despierta	2016–present	Las Estrellas	N+
Expreso de la Mañana	2007–present	N+ Foro	N+
Venga la alegría	2004–present	Azteca Uno	TV Azteca
Vivalavi	2007–present	Canal 6	Grupo Multimedios
Sale el sol	2016–present	Imagen Televisión	Grupo Imagen

==== Former ====
Programme	Run	Network	Production company
Nuevo Día	1992–1998	Las Estrellas	Televisa
Cada mañana	1993–2003	Azteca 13	TV Azteca
Nuestro día	2007–2015	Imagen Televisión	Grupo Imagen

=== Montenegro ===
Programme	Network
Boje jutra	TV Vijesti
Dobro jutro Crna Goro	TVCG 1
Rujna zora	Gradska televizija

=== Morocco ===
==== Current ====
Programme	Network
Sabahiyat 2M	2M TV

=== Netherlands ===
==== Current ====
Programme	Network	Production company	Notes
De 538 Ochtendshow	TV 538	Talpa Network	A visual simulcast of Radio 538 breakfast programme
Goedemorgen Nederland	NPO 1	WNL	
Hart Van Nederland - Ochtendeditie	SBS 6	Talpa TV (Talpa Network)	
NOS Jeugdjournaal Ochtend	NPO Zapp	NOS	
NOS Journaal Ochtend	NPO 1	NOS	
NOS Radio 1 Journaal	NPO 1 Extra	NOS	A visual simulcast of NPO Radio 1's breakfast programme
RTL Ontbijtnieuws	RTL 4	NEP The Netherlands	
RTL Z Ontbijtnieuws	RTL Z	NEP The Netherlands	
RTL Z Ontbijt Voorbeurs	RTL Z	NEP The Netherlands	
Spraakmakers	NPO 1 Extra	KRO-NCRV	A visual simulcast of NPO Radio 1's breakfast programme
Sven op 1	NPO 1 Extra	WNL	A visual simulcast of NPO Radio 1's breakfast programme

==== Former ====
Programme	Network	Production company	Notes
Koffietijd	RTL 4	John de Mol Produkties (1994–2001) and Talpa Entertainment Productions (2010–2023)	
Ochtendspits	Nederland 1	WNL	
Ontbijt Show	RTL 4		
Ontbijt TV	Nederland 1	IKON (1994), NCRV (1994) and KRO (1994–2002)	
RTL Breakfast Club	RTL 4		
Vandaag de dag	Nederland 1	WNL	Changed name to Goedemorgen Nederland

=== New Zealand ===
==== Current ====
Programme	Run	Network	Note
Breakfast	1997–present	TVNZ 1	
BNZ Business Breakfast	2026–present	TVNZ 1	

==== Former ====
Programme	Network
AM	Three
AM Early	Three
Paul Henry	Three
ASB Business	Three
Breakfast Business	TVNZ 1
Sunrise	Three
Brunch	Choice
Firstline	Three
Saturday Breakfast	Three
Good Morning	TVNZ 1
TVNZ News Now (morning edition)	TVNZ 7
Morena	TVNZ 1

=== Nigeria ===
Programme	Network
Good Morning Nigeria	NTA
Wake Up Nigeria	TVC News

=== Norway ===
==== Current ====
Programme	Run	Network
God Morgen, Norge!	1994–present	TV 2 Direkte
Nyhetsmorgen	2009–present	TV 2 Nyheter
NRK Nyheter Nyhetsmorgen	2008–present	NRK1

==== Former ====
Programme	Run	Network
Frokost-TV	1983–1993 (Saturdays only); 2001; 2003–2008	NRK1
Morgennytt	1999–2001; since 2008; 2008–2010	NRK1; NRK2

=== Pakistan ===
==== Current ====
Programme	Network
Good Morning Pakistan	ARY Digital
Jago Pakistan Jago	Hum TV
Masala Mornings	Masala TV
Meena Bazaar with Ayesha Sana	PTV
Meri Subah Haseen Hai	A-Plus Entertainment
Morning with Farah	ATV
Morning with Juggan	PTV Home
Morning With Sahir	A-Plus Entertainment
Muskurati Morning	TV One
Nadia Khan Show	Geo TV
Subah Saveray Samaa k Saath	SAMAA TV
Subh-e-Pakistan	Geo Entertainment
Yayvo Subhenau	PTV News
Utho Jago Pakistan	Geo Entertainment
Ye Hai Zindagi	Dawn News

==== Former ====
Programme	Network
Yeh Subh Tumhari Hai	CNBC Pakistan

=== Panama ===
==== Current ====
Programme	Network
Buenos Días	TVN
Debate Abierto	RPC
Telemetro Reporta Matutino	Telemetro
Tu Mañana	Telemetro
TVN Noticias AM	TVN

==== Former ====
Programme	Network
A Gusto	RCM
RCM Noticias Matutino	RCM
Telediario Matutino	TVO

=== Paraguay ===
Programme	Network
Mañaneras	América Televisión
Será un gran día	Canal 13
Mañana Plus	Red Guaraní
Tu media mañana	Paraguay TV
Arriba Paraguay	Paravisión
El mañanero	La Tele
Día a Día	Telefuturo
La Mañana de Cada Día	SNT
La Mañana de Unicanal	Unicanal
La mañana de Ocho TV	Ocho TV

=== Peru ===
Programme	Network
90 Matinal	Latina Televisión
Buenos Días Perú	Panamericana Television
D6A9	Canal N
Nuevo Día	Perú TV Arequipa
Primer Reporte	ATV
Primera Edición	América Televisión
TV Peru Noticias EM	TV Perú

=== Philippines ===
==== Current ====
Programme	Run	Network
Unang Hirit	1999–present	GMA
Good Morning Kuya	2007–present	UNTV
Rise and Shine Pilipinas	2020–present	PTV (2020–present); IBC (2022–2026)
Dobol B TV	2021–present	GTV
Frontline sa Umaga	2021–present	TV5 (2021–present); RPTV (2024–present); Kapatid Channel (2026–present)
Siento por Siento	2023–present	Net 25
Love, Tonipet and Everythaang!	2023–present	Net 25
ASPN: Ano Sa Palagay N'yo?	2021–present	Net 25
Kada Umaga	2021–present	Net 25
Ted Failon at DJ Chacha sa True FM	2020–present	One PH (2020–present); TV5 (2020–present); RPTV (2024–present); True TV (2024–present); Kapatid Channel (2025–present)
Gising Pilipinas	2023–present	DZMM TeleRadyo (2023–present); PRTV Prime Media (2024–present)
Dos por Dos	2020–present	DZRH News Television
Metro Morning	2026–present	Bilyonaryo News Channel; Abante TV
Memo with Korina	2026–present	Bilyonaryo News Channel; Abante TV
The Spokes	2025–present	Bilyonaryo News Channel
Asintado: Ciento Por Ciento	2026–present	Aliw 23
Karambola	2005–present	Aliw 23
Newslight Sa Umaga	2019–present	Light TV
Bangon Na Pilipinas	2019–present	Light TV
Pulso ng Bayan	2022–present	SMNI News Channel
Headstart with Karen Davila	2010–present	ABS-CBN News Channel
Morning Matters	2025–present	One News
Treze Mornings	2026–present	IBC
Walang Atrasan	2024–present	Abante TV

==== Former ====
Programme	Run	Network	Notes
The Morning Show	1974–2012	GTV (1974–1978), NBN/PTV (2005–2007, 2010–2012)	
Good Morning Manila	1980–1986	MBS	The first-ever breakfast television show in the Philippines
Magandang Umaga Po	1986–1996	ABS-CBN	Originally titled Good Morning, Philippines (1986) and Magandang Umaga (1986–1988)
Nescafé Morning News	1987–1989	ABS-CBN	
Windows with Johnny Revilla	1988–1995	PTV	
Kape at Balita	1991–2013	GMA (1991–1993), GMA News TV (2012–2013)	
Wake Up Call	1994–1998	RPN	
Magandang Umaga Ba?	1995–1998	IBC	
Magandang Umaga, Pilipinas	1996–2007	ABS-CBN	Originally titled Alas Singko Y Medya (1996–2002) and Magandang Umaga, Bayan (2002–2005)
Mornings @ GMA	1998–1999	GMA	
AM @ PTV	1998–1999	PTV	
Breakfast	1999–2007	Studio 23	
Magandang Umaga Bayan Weekend	1999–2004	ABS-CBN	Originally titled Alas Singko Y Medya Weekend (1999–2002)
Mornings @ PTV	1999–2000	PTV	
Good Morning Pilipinas	2000–2001, 2016–2017	PTV	
New Day @ PTV	2001	PTV	
New Day @ NBN	2001–2002	NBN	
AM @ NBN	2002–2003	NBN	
Magandang Morning Philippines!	2003–2004	RPN	
TeleAga	2003–2005	NBN	
Pilipinas, Gising Ka Na Ba?	2005–2007	UNTV	
First Look	2006–2015	ABS-CBN News Channel	
Mornings @ ANC	2006–2017	ABS-CBN News Channel	
Umagang Kay Ganda	2007–2020	ABS-CBN (2007–2020), ABS-CBN News Channel (2007–2015)	
One Morning Cafe	2007–2010	NBN, RPN, IBC (television); PBS (radio)	
Sapul sa Singko	2010–2012	TV5 (2010–2012), AksyonTV (2011–2012)	
Pambansang Almusal	2011–2021	Net 25	
Dobol B sa News TV	2011–2012; 2017–2021	GMA News TV	
News to Go	2011–2019	GMA News TV	
Good Morning Club	2012–2014	TV5	
Metro One	2012–2013	PTV	
Solar Daybreak	2012–2015	Talk TV (2012); Solar News Channel (2012–2014); 9TV (2014–2015)	
Good Morning Boss	2013–2016	PTV	
RadyoBisyon	2014–2017	PTV, IBC (television); PBS (radio)	
Good Morning Ser	2014	TV5/AksyonTV	
Aksyon sa Umaga	2014–2017	TV5/AksyonTV	
CNN Philippines New Day	2016–2024	CNN Philippines	
CNN Philippines Headline News	2015–2016	CNN Philippines	
Masayang Umaga Po!	2015–2017	Net 25	
Early Edition	2017–2020	ABS-CBN News Channel	
Bagong Pilipinas	2017–2020	PTV	
Daily Info	2017–2020	PTV	
Dobol B sa GMA	2020	GMA	
Matters of Fact	2020–2021	ABS-CBN News Channel	
Sakto	2020–2023	Kapamilya Channel/TeleRadyo Serbisyo	
ANC Rundown	2021–2024	ABS-CBN News Channel	
Gud Morning Kapatid	2023–2026	TV5 (2023–2026); RPTV (2024–2026); Kapatid Channel (2025–2026)	
Usapang TOL	2024–2025	Aliw 23	
Beautiful Day	2024–2025	Bilyonaryo News Channel	
Bangon Bagong Pilipinas	2025–2026	DWAN 1206 TV; IBC	
Bawat Gising May Blessing	2025	DWAN 1206 TV	
Pasada Balita	2025–2026	Aliw 23	
Abante sa Umaga	2025–2026	Abante TV	

=== Poland ===
==== Current ====
Programme	Run	Network
Dzień Dobry TVN (Good Morning TVN)	2005–present	TVN
Halo tu Polsat (Hello Polsat)	2024–present	Polsat
Morning World Today	2021–present	TVP World
Nowy Dzień (A New Day)	2008–present	Polsat News, Polsat
Info Poranek (The Morning Info)	2007–present	TVP Info, TVP1
Poranek wPolsce24 (The wPolsce24 Morning)	2017–present	wPolsce24
Polska o Poranku (Poland In The Morning)	2024–present	TVP Info, TVP3
Pytanie na śniadanie (A Question For Breakfast)	2002–present	TVP2
Republika Wstajemy	2024–present	TV Republika
Śniadanie Rymanowskiego (Rymanowski Breakfast)	2021–present	Polsat News
Wstajesz i wiesz (You Get Up And You Know)	2001–present	TVN24
Poranek Inwestora (Investor Morning)	2020–present	Biznes24

==== Former ====
Programme	Run	Network	Notes
Kawa czy herbata? (Coffee Or Tea?)	1992–2013	TVP1	
Dzień dobry w sobotę (Good Morning On Saturday)	2014–2015	TVP1	
Dzień dobry, Polsko! (Good Morning, Poland!)	2017–2018	TVP1	
#dzieńdobryWP (#goodmorningWP)	2016–2018	Telewizja WP	
Poranek na BIŚ (Morning on BIŚ)	2014–2017	TVN24 BiS	
Poranek z Polsat Sport (The Polsat Sport Morning)	2020	Polsat Sport	
Puls o poranku (Pulse In The Morning)	2008	TV Puls	

=== Portugal ===
Programme	Network
Bom Dia Portugal	RTP1; RTP Notícias
Diário da Manhã	TVI
Edição da Manhã	SIC; SIC Noticias
Manhã CM	CMTV
Manhã Informativa	Sport TV +
News Now Todas as Manhãs	News Now
Novo Dia	CNN Portugal

=== Puerto Rico ===
Programme	Run	Station/network
Noticentro al Amanecer	2000–present	WAPA-TV
Hoy Día Puerto Rico	2021–present	WKAQ-TV

=== Romania ===
Programme	Network
Bună Dimineața România (English: Good Morning Romania)	Euronews România
Digimatinal (English: Digi Morning)	Digi24
Focus La Prima Ora (English: Focus First)	Prima TV
Matinal Prima News (English: Prima News Morning)	Prima News
Observator Matinal (English: Observator Morning)	Antena 1
Neatza cu Răzvan și Dani (English: Mornin' with Răzvan and Dani)	Antena 1
Știrile dimineţii Antena 3 CNN (English: Antena 3 CNN Morning News)	Antena 3 CNN
Știrile dimineţii (English: Morning News)	B1 TV
Știrile ProTV dimineţii (English: ProTV Morning News)	Pro TV
Telejurnal Matinal (English: Morning Telejurnal)	TVR 1 TVR Info
Weekend Matinal (English: Morning Weekend)	TVR 1 TVR Info
Zori de zi (English: Morning Dawn)	OTV

=== Russia ===
==== Current ====
Programme	Run	Network	Notes
Good Morning	1986–present	Channel 1	Originally titled "60 minutes" (1986-1987), "90 minutes" (1987-1988), "120 minutes" (1988-1991), "120+30/Morning 120+30" (1991), "Morning" (1991-1994), "TV-Morning" (1994-1996)
Mood	1997–present	TV Center	
Morning. The Best	2019–present	NTV	
Russia's Morning	1998–present	Russia 1	Originally titled "Good Morning, Russia!" (1998-2001, 2002–2009), "Morning on RTR" (2002)

==== Former ====
Programme	Run	Network	Notes
Day By Day	1998–2002	TV-6	Cancelled as a result of the shutdown of TV-6; a daytime version of the programme was also produced.
Good Morning, Moscow	1991–1997	MTK	Cancelled because of MTK channel refurbishment (now "3 kanal"), replaced by Mood
NTV in the Morning	1996–2015	NTV	The name of the program and format were constantly changing; between 2015 and 2017, the successor programs to NTV in the Morning didn't last even a year.
Business Morning	2017-2019	NTV	Replaced by Morning. The Best

=== Saudi Arabia ===
Programme	Network
Sabah Alsaudiah (صباح السعودية)	Al Saudiya
Sabah Al Kahir Ya Arab (صباح الخير يا عرب)	MBC 1

=== Serbia ===
==== Current ====
Programme	Run	Network	Notes
Beograde, Dobro Jutro (English: Belgrade, Good Morning		Studio B	
Novo jutro (English: New Morning	2018–present	RTV Pink	In winter of 2018 Pink launched new morning show format, after Jovana and Srdjan quit, with new hosts - Dea & Predrag.
Dobro jutro, Srbijo! (English: Good Morning, Serbia!	2010–present (current run)	Happy TV	Until 2010, it aired on TV Košava until 6:30 am, when Happy TV would sign on.
Dobro jutro, Vojvodino (English: Good Morning, Vojvodina	2002–present	RTV 1	
Jutarnji Program (English: The Morning Show)	1986–present	RTS 1	Most watched morning show programme in Serbia.
Jutro na Prvoj (English: Morning on Prva)	2018–present	Prva	In 2018 after the success of new daily magazine format called "150 Minutes", Prva launched morning show programme with hosts of Pink's morning show - Jovana Joksimovic and Srdjan Predojevic. In late 2020, after scandal and disagreement with network's management, Jovana and Srdjan got fired and soon replaced with new hosts - Filip, Marijana and Bojana.
Novi dan (English: New day)	2014–present	N1	Licensed version of CNN's New Day
Probudi se (English: Wake up!)	2020–present	Nova S	
Uranak K1 (styled: Ura na K1) (English: Early K1)	2020–present	K1	Jovana Joksimovic's new morning show.
Euronews Jutro (English: Euronews Morning)	2021–present	Euronews Serbia	

==== Former ====
Programme	Run	Network	Notes
Dobro jutro! (English: Good Morning!)	2010–2018	RTV Pink	The Morning Show's hosts Jovana and Srdjan moved to Pink from RTS and launched daily morning magazine, copying The Morning Show format.
Tačno 9 (English: Exactly 9)	2012–2015	Prva	The Serbian version of the former RTL show Punkt 9; there is also a daily edition, called Tačno 1 (English: Exactly 1), a localized one-hour timeshifted version of the RTL show "Punkt 12". It stopped broadcasting in late June 2015, saying it was preparing to launch a new format.
Fox i Priljatelji (English: Fox and Friends)	2007–2008	Fox	Serbian version of the Fox News program Fox and Friends.
Uhvati dan (English: Seize the day)	2007–2008	Enter TV	
Dizanje (English: Lifting)	2006–2011	B92	
Naše jutro (English: Our Morning)	2015	B92	
Budilnik (English: Alarm clock)	2004–2006	BK TV	
Dobar komšija (English: A good neighbor)	2006–2010	RTV Pink	
Jutro sa Nešom Ristićem (English: Morning with Neša Ristic)	2008–2010	RTV Pink	
Jutarnji magazin (English: Morning magazine)	2010	RTV Pink	
Jutro (English: Morning)	2007–2008	TV Avala	
Otvoreni studio (English: Open studio)	2008–2012	TV Avala	

=== Singapore ===
==== Current ====
Programme	Run	Network
Asia Squawk Box	February 1998 – present	CNBC Asia
Asia First	1 April 2019 – present	CNA
Morning Express (晨光第一线)	1 September 2014 – present	Channel 8
Newsday	13 June 2011 – present	BBC News
The Rundown	31 March 2014 – present	CNBC Asia
Street Signs	31 March 2014 – present	CNBC Asia

==== Former ====
Programme	Run	Network
AM Saturday	6 September 1997 – 27 February 1999	Channel 5
AM Singapore	29 August 1994 – 26 February 1999	Channel 5
Good Morning Singapore (早安您好)	6 March 1995 – 29 August 2014	Channel 8

=== Slovakia ===
==== Current ====
Programme	Network
Raňajky	TA3
Ranné Noviny	TV JOJ; JOJ 24
Ranné Správy STVR	Jednotka; 24
Teleráno	Markíza

==== Former ====
Programme	Run	Network	Notes
Raňajojky	2003–August 2009	TV JOJ	Replaced by new project in cooperation with Fun Radio
Ranný Magazín	2009–2010	Jednotka	

=== Slovenia ===
==== Current ====
Programme	Run	Network	Notes
Dobro jutro (English: Good Morning)	2002–present	TV SLO 1	
Dobro jutro (English: Good Morning)	1995–present	VTV Velenje	First morning show programme in Slovenia.
Jutro na Planetu (English: Morning on Planet)	2021–present	Planet TV	

==== Former ====
Programme	Run	Network
Dobro jutro, Slovenija	1996–2001	POP TV

=== South Africa ===
Programme	Network
Expresso	SABC 3
Morning Live	SABC 2 SABC News
South African Morning	eNCA
Squawk Box Africa	CNBC Africa
The Morning Show	e.tv

=== South Korea ===
==== Current ====
Programme	Run	Network
Achim&	16 September 2013 – 11 November 2022; 2 January 2024 –	JTBC
Brave Talk Show Forthright	6 July 2020 –	SBS Biz
Economic Morning	1 December 2011 –	MBN
Good Morning Republic of Korea	30 May 2011 – 31 December 2014; 7 December 2024 -	KBS2
Good Morning MBN	4 March 2013 –	MBN
Good Morning Today's Stock Market (굿모닝 오늘의 증시)	6 April 2020 –	Maeil Business TV
Happy Days	11 February 2019 –	Channel A
KBS Morning News Time	1 November 2004 –	KBS2 (KBS News 24)
KBS News	25 May 1981 –	KBS1 (KBS News 24)
KBS News Plaza	20 May 1991 –	KBS1 (KBS News 24)
Kids Animaltv	8 September 2021 –	KBS2
Kim Jin's Straight	8 July 2013 –	Channel A
Know Body Yourself	13 October 2025 –	TV CHOSUN
Live Today (라이브 투데이)	1 December 2011 –	Yonhap News TV
MBC News Today (MBC 뉴스투데이)	17 April 1995 – 19 October 1996; 1 April 2002 –	MBC
Money Show	4 January 2016 –	SBS Biz
Morningbell	4 January 2016 –	SBS Biz
National Network News	15 July 2015 –	MBN
News Today (뉴스오늘)	1 December 2011 –	Yonhap News TV
North Windows	14 March 1989 –	KBS1
SBS Morning Wide	10 December 1991 –	SBS
Screening Humanity	1 May 2000 –	KBS1
Shintong Bangtong	8 April 2013 –	TV CHOSUN
Starting 600 (출발 600)	1 December 2011 –	Yonhap News TV
Stock Market Today's (증시 오늘)	6 April 2020 –	Maeil Business TV
Sunday Diagnosis Live	9 May 1993 –	KBS1 (KBS News 24)
TV CHOSUN News Parade	17 April 2013 –	TV CHOSUN
TV kindergarten	20 September 1982 –	KBS 2
Whatever	31 October 1983 –	KBS 1
YTN News Square at 4AM (YTN 뉴스퀘어 4AM)	1 March 1995 –	YTN
YTN News Start (YTN 뉴스START)	1 December 2018 –	YTN
YTN News Up (YTN 뉴스UP)	5 October 2005 – 1 April 2024; 1 May 2024 –	YTN

==== Former ====
Programme	Run	Network
2TV Morning (2TV 아침)	1 January 2015 – 22 April 2016	KBS2
Business Wide Backbriefing Now (경제와이드 백브리핑 시시각각)	4 January 2016 – 23 August 2024	SBS Biz
Global Village (지구촌 뉴스)	1 May 2000 –	KBS2
Good Morning A (굿모닝 A)	14 January 2013 –	Channel A
Good Morning Korea LIVE (굿모닝 대한민국 라이브)	6 July 2020 – 6 May 2022	KBS2
Morning Y (모닝 Y)	2011 – 2015	Yonhap News TV
Live OBS (생방송 OBS)	2007–2009, 2009–2014	OBS Gyeongin TV
MBC Morning News 2000 (MBC 아침뉴스 2000)	1996–2000	MBC
MBC News Good Morning Korea (MBC 뉴스 굿모닝 코리아)	1996–2000	MBC
Sangam-Dong Class (상암동 클라스)	2022 – 2023	JTBC

=== Spain ===
==== Current ====
Programme	Run	Network
Telediario Matinal	1994–present	La 1; 24 Horas
La hora de La 1	2020–present	La 1; 24 Horas
Antena 3 Noticias de la mañana	2004–present	Antena 3
Espejo Público	1996–2006, 2006–present	Antena 3
Informativos Telecinco El Matinal	1998–present	Telecinco
La mirada crítica	1998–2009, 2023–present	Telecinco
Aruser@s	2018–present	LaSexta
Asturias Hoy, 1ª edición	2006–present	TPA7
Bos Días		TVG
Buenos días, Aragón	2006–present	Aragón TV
Buenos días, Andalucía	1989–present	Canal Sur
Buenos días, Canaria	2001–present	Televisión Canaria
Buenos días, Madrid	1994–present	Telemadrid
Castilla-La Mancha Despierta		CMM TV
Els Dematins	2005–present	IB3
Els Matins	2004–present	TV3; 3CatInfo
Egun On Euskadi	2013–present	ETB 1
Les Notícies del Matí	2018–present	À Punt

==== Former ====
Programme	Run	Network
Los Desayunos de TVE	1994–2020	La 1; 24 Horas
La mañana de La 1	2009–2020	La 1
La 2 Noticias Matinal	1994–1996	TVE2
Bon Día Catalunya	1992–2004	TV3
Bon Dia Comunitat Valenciana		Nou
Matinal Cuatro	2007–2010	Cuatro; CNN+
Las Noticias de la Mañana		Antena 3
Por la Mañana	2002–2008	TVE1
Ruedo Ibérico	2004–2006	Antena 3
Saber Vivir	1997–2009	TVE1
Las Mañanas de Cuatro	2006–2018	Cuatro
El Programa de Ana Rosa	2005–2023	Telecinco

=== Sri Lanka ===
Programme	Network
Rise and Shine	Channel Eye (SLRC)
Good Morning Sri Lanka	TV 1 (MTV Channel)

=== Sweden ===
==== Current ====
Programme	Network	Run	Notes
Morgonstudion	SVT1	2017–present	Preceded by God morgon Sverige (Formerly titled SVT morgon, Rapport morgon)
Nyhetsmorgon	TV4	1992–present	Formerly titled Go'morron

==== Former ====
Programme	Network
Morrongänget	Kanal Lokal Göteborg
Rivstart	TV6
RIX MorronZoo	TV3
Vakna med The Voice	Kanal 5

=== Switzerland ===
Program	Network	Language	Notes
6H/9H du LFM	CARAC 3	French	A visual simulcast of LFM breakfast programme
Alba Chiara	RSI La 1	Italian	A visual simulcast of RSI Rete Uno breakfast programme
L’Équipe du Matin du One Fm	CARAC 2	French	A visual simulcast of One FM breakfast programme
RTS Info La Matinale	RTS 2	French	A visual simulcast of RTS Première's breakfast programme
SRF 3 auf zwei	SRF zwei	German	A visual simulcast of Radio SRF 3 breakfast programme

=== Taiwan ===
Program	Network
Good Morning TTV News (Chinese: 早安您好台視新聞)	TTV
Good Morning Taiwan, PTS (Chinese: 公視早安新聞)	PTS

=== Thailand ===
==== Current ====
Program	Run	Network	Airing Time
Workpoint Breakfast News (Thai: ข่าวเช้าเวิร์คพอยท์)	2017–present	Workpoint TV	05:10-08:45 (Weekdays); 05:10-08:30 (Weekends)
Morning News Green (Thai: ข่าวเช้าหัวเขียว)	2020–present	Thairath TV	05:30-08:30 (Weekdays); 07:00-09:00 (Weekends)
9 Morning News (Thai: 9 ข่าวเช้า)	2022–present	9MCOT HD	06:30-07:50
Inside Thailand (Thai: เจาะลึกทั่วไทย)	2010–present	9MCOT HD	08:00-09:30
Morning News Show (Thai: โชว์ข่าวเช้านี้)	1 August 2016–present	PPTV HD	08:20-09:25
Morning Talk (Thai: เรื่องเล่าเช้านี้)	2 June 2003–present	Channel 3 HD	06:00-08:20
ThaiPBS New Day (Thai: วันใหม่ไทยพีบีเอส)	30 September 2013–present	Thai PBS	05:00-07:00
News Insight (Thai: สนามข่าวเจ็ดสี)	2014–present	Channel 7 HD	07:00-08:30 (Weekdays); 05:30-06:45 (Weekends)
This Morning at Mochit (Thai: เช้านี้ที่หมอชิต)	1 June 2009–present	Channel 7 HD	05:30-07:00
Jor Morning News (Thai: จ้อข่าวเช้า)	2024-present	Channel 7 HD	04:30-05:30
ONE Morning News (Thai: ข่าวเช้าช่องวัน)	2017–present	ONE31	05:50-07:50

==== Former ====
Program	Run	Network
Chao Khao Khon Khon Khao Chao (Thai: เช้าข่าวข้น คนข่าวเช้า)	1 April 2009 – 29 June 2012	Modernine TV
Good Morning Siam (Thai: สยามเช้านี้)	1 January 2007 – 31 December 2010	RTA 5
T News : Live Indeep Real (Thai: ทีนิวส์ สด ลึก จริง)	2016 – 2018	Bright TV; Produced by T News
Thailand's This Morning (Thai: เช้านี้ประเทศไทย)	1 July 2016–2024	RTA 5
Channel 7 Morning News (Thai: เช้าข่าว 7 สี)	1996 – 2024	Channel 7 HD

=== Trinidad and Tobago ===
Programme	Network
CNC3 Early Morning	CNC3
Cock-A-Doodle-Doo	Gayelle TV
First Up	C Television
Morning Edition	CCN TV6
Sunrise	WIN TV

=== Turkey ===
Programme	Network
4. Güç	TV5
A'dan Z'ye	CNN Türk
Başka Bir Gün	KRT TV
Başlama Vuruşu	HT Spor
beIN Sabah	beIN Sports Haber
Cem Küçük ile Günaydın Türkiye	TGRT Haber
Dinamik Sabahlar	sportstv
Gün Başlıyor	Akit TV
Gün Başlıyor	AS TV
Gün Başlıyor	Flash Haber
Gün Başlıyor	Lider Haber TV
Gun Uyanıyor	TV100
Güne Başlarken	NTV
Günaydın Spor	Ekol Sports
Günaydın Türkiye	Ulusal Kanal
Haber Bülteni (morning edition)	TH Türkhaber TV
HT Gün Başlıyor	Habertürk TV
İlk Baski	TRT Spor
İsmail Küçükkaya ile Yeni Bir Sabah	Halk TV
Moderatör Sabah	24
Sabah Ajansı	A Haber
Sabah Ekranı	EKOTÜRK
Sabah Notları	CNBC-e
Sabah Pusulası	TELE1
Sabah Raporu	Bloomberg HT
Sabah Sporu	A Spor
Seans Öncesi	A Para
Selver Gözüaçık ile Günaydın	Ekol TV
Selvi Karaman ile Bu Sabah	Bengü Türk TV
Sözcü ile Uyanma Vakti	Sözcü TV
Spor Gazetesi	tivibu Spor
TRT Haber'de Dün Bugün	TRT Haber
Türkiye'de Sabah	Haber Global
Ülke'du Sabah	Ülke TV
Yeni Bir Gün	TVNET

=== Ukraine ===
Programme	Network
Prokydaisia	My-Ukraina+
Ranok u velykomu misti	ICTV2
Snidanok z 1+1	1+1 Ukraina

=== United Arab Emirates ===
Programme	Network
Dubai Hatha Al Sabah (دبي هذا الصباح)	Dubai TV

=== United Kingdom ===
==== Current ====
Programme	Run	Network	Notes
BBC Breakfast	2000–present	BBC One	Saturday simulcast on BBC News
Sunday with Laura Kuenssberg	2022–present	BBC One/BBC News	Sunday morning politics show; branded as The Andrew Marr Show until December 2021
Morning Live	2020–present	BBC One	
Sunday Morning Live	2010–present	BBC One	Sunday morning religious and current affairs discussion programme
Saturday Kitchen	2002–present	BBC One	Saturday morning cookery show
Saturday Mash-Up!	2017–present	BBC Two/CBBC	Saturday morning children's magazine entertainment
BBC News (morning edition)	2008–present	BBC One/BBC Two/BBC News	Branded as The World Today 1997-2011 and BBC World News (morning edition) 2009-2023; weekends only since October 2017 Shown at 5am on BBC One on everyday's & 10am BBC Two on weekday's
Business Today (morning edition)	2024–present	BBC One/BBC Two/BBC News	Weekdays morning business news; Branded as World Business Report 2008–2024
Good Morning Britain	2014–present	ITV	
Lorraine	2010–present	ITV	
This Morning	1988–present	ITV	
Prue Leith's Cotswold Kitchen	2024–present	ITV	Saturday morning talk show
Jimmy and Shivi's Farmhouse Breakfast	2024–present	ITV	Sunday morning farmshow
Sunday Brunch	2012–present	Channel 4	Sunday morning cookery & talk show
Milkshake!	1997–present	5	
Jeremy Vine	2018–present	5	
Sky News @ Mornings	2025–present	Sky News	Branded as Mornings with Ridge and Frost Monday–Thursday simulcast on Sky One and Mornings with Jones and Melbourne Friday–Sunday
Sunday Morning with Trevor Phillips	2023–present	Sky News	Sunday morning politics show
Business Live (morning edition)	2025–present	Sky News	Weekdays morning business news; Branded as Ian King Live (2014–2025)
Sky Sports Breakfast	1998–present	Sky Sports News	Weekday's morning simulcast on Sky Sports Main Event and Sky Sports +
Breakfast with...	2022–present	GB News	Branded as Breakfast with Eamonn and Isabel Monday–Friday and Breakfast with Stephen and Anne Saturday–Sunday
The Early Breakfast Show	2022–present	Talk	
The Breakfast Show	2022–present	Talk	Branded as The Julia Hartley-Brewer Breakfast Show Monday–Thursday

==== Former ====
Programme	Run	Network	Notes
The Andrew Marr Show	2005–2021	BBC One	Sunday morning politics show; branded as Sunday AM until September 2007
The Big Breakfast	1992–2002	Channel 4	
Breakfast News	1989–2000	BBC One	
Breakfast Time	1983–1989	BBC One	
Breakfast with Frost	1993–2005	BBC One	
Business Breakfast	1993–2000	BBC One	Was part of Breakfast News from September 1989 until December 1992
The World Today (1997 Version)	1997–2011	BBC One/BBC Two/BBC News	Original version
Business Briefing	2017–2020	BBC One/BBC Two/BBC News	Weekdays, also aimed at European and African audiences on BBC World News
World Business Report	1997–2017; 2020–2024	BBC One/BBC Two/BBC News	
BBC Business Live	2015–2019	BBC News	
BBC News at Nine	2018–2023	BBC News	
The Channel Four Daily	1989–1992	Channel 4	
Channel M Breakfast	2007–2009	Channel M	
Cricket AM	2006–2013	Sky Sports 1	Saturday morning cricket show
Daybreak (1983)	1983	TV-am (ITV)	
Daybreak (2010)	2010–2014	ITV	
The Early Rundown	2019–2024	Sky Showcase/Sky News	
Estuary News	2013–????	Estuary TV	
Freshly Squeezed	2006–2012	Channel 4	
GMTV	1993–2010	GMTV (ITV)	
The Great British Breakfast	2021–2022	GB News	
Good Morning Britain	1983–1992	TV-am (ITV)	
Good Morning Calendar	1977	Yorkshire Television	Is now the branding of ITV News Calendar's bulletins within Good Morning Britain
Good Morning North	1977	Tyne Tees Television	
Holly & Stephen's Saturday Showdown	2004–2006	ITV/CITV	Saturday morning children's magazine entertainment
Jo and Sparky Breakfast Show	2015–2025	Notts TV	Live studio feed from Gem 106, previously The Sam & Amy Breakfast Show
Katie Piper's Breakfast Show	2022–2024	ITV	Sunday morning talk show
Morning Glory	2006	Channel 4	
Peston on Sunday	2016–2018	ITV	Sunday morning politics show
RI:SE	2002–2003	Channel 4	
Saturday Superstore	1982–1987	BBC One	
Scrambled!	2014–2021	ITV/CITV	Saturday morning children's magazine entertainment
Sky News @ Breakfast	2019–2025	Sky News/Sky Showcase	
Soccer AM	1994–2023	Sky Showcase/Sky Sports	Saturday morning football show
Sophy Ridge on Sunday	2017–2023	Sky News/Sky Showcase	Sunday morning politics show
SMTV Live	1998–2003	ITV	
Sunrise	1989–2019	Sky News	
Swap Shop	1976–1982	BBC One	
Nicky Campbell	2023	BBC Two/BBC News	A visual simulcast of BBC Radio 5 Live's breakfast programme
The Briefing	2017–2020	BBC One/BBC Two/BBC News	Weekdays, also aimed at European and African audiences on BBC World News
The Wright Stuff	2000–2018	Channel 5	
Tiswas	1974–1982	ITV	
Victoria Derbyshire	2015–2020	BBC Two/BBC News	Weekdays
Wake Up Bristol	2015–????	Bristol TV	
Wake Up Cardiff	2015–????	Cardiff TV	
Wake Up Leeds	2015–????	Leeds TV	
Wake Up London	2014–????	London Live	
Wake Up Tyne & Wear	2015–????	Tyne & Wear TV	
Weekend	2014–2017	ITV	
Worklife	2019–2020	BBC News	
Zoe Ball On...	2018	ITV	

=== United States ===
==== Current ====
Program	Run	Network	Notes
AgDay	1982 – present	Syndicated	Daily half-hour morning agribusiness news program currently produced by Farm Journal Media and recorded at WNDU-TV in South Bend, Indiana. Farm Journal Media also produces the weekly U.S. Farm Report which has been in production since 1975. Full broadcasts of AgDay are uploaded daily at agweb.com.
America This Morning	1982–present	ABC	Originally titled ABC News This Morning in 1982. Changed its title to ABC World News This Morning in early 1983. Adopted current title on 13 November 2006. Originally aired a full hour from 6-7 a.m. Eastern Time as a lead in to Good Morning America. Over time, it got pushed back to early mornings and shorten to a half hour national morning newscast airing live from 3:30-4:00 a.m., as many ABC affiliates signed on local morning newscasts and expanding the lengths of those respected broadcasts over time.
America's Morning Headquarters	2014–present	The Weather Channel	Airs seven days a week.
America's Newsroom	2007–present	Fox News	
Bloomberg Daybreak Americas	2015–present	Bloomberg Television	Formerly titled Bloomberg <GO> (2015–2016)
Bloomberg Surveillance	2010–present	Bloomberg Television	
CBS Morning News	1982–present	CBS	Early morning program that first started on 4 October 1982. Formerly titled CBS Early Morning News (1982–1987) replacing Captain Kangaroo which moved to weekends. Current title previously used for a 15-minute format that ran in 1957 as a lead out of the Jimmy Dean era of The Morning Show, and later as a 60-minute morning newscast that aired from 1963 to 1979 (Fourth daily Morning/Breakfast show for CBS). The CBS Morning News moniker was also used for a program that aired from January 1982 through January 1987, that competed directly with NBC's Today and ABC's Good Morning America (and was the sixth daily Morning/Breakfast show for CBS). The CBS Early Morning News version of the program dropped the word Early in the title when the 1982-87 version of the CBS Morning News was canceled in favor of The Morning Program.
CBS Mornings	2021 – present	CBS	Retooled version of the 2012-2021 version of CBS This Morning, integrating Gottfried Reiche's Abblasen fanfare as done by Samuel Oatts (instead of Wynton Marsalis), and other elements of its Sunday Morning program (including the iconic Sun of May Logo), coupled with the five note CBS instrumental logo ("This, Is CBS") in a fast-paced daily program. Overall this is the 11th daily Morning/Breakfast show to air on CBS.
CBS Saturday Morning	2021 – present	CBS	The original version of CBS News Saturday Morning aired from 1997 until 1999, and was anchored by Russ Mitchell (now with WKYC-TV Cleveland) and former New York congresswoman Susan Molinari. Replaced by the Saturday edition of The Early Show in 1999. Revived as an extension to CBS Mornings in 2021.
CBS News Sunday Morning	1979–present	CBS	Originally aired six days a week, titled in accordance to the day of the week (Monday Morning, Tuesday Morning, etc.), later dropped the days of the week except on Sunday. The daily version of Morning (the fifth daily Morning/Breakfast show for CBS) was dropped in 1982 for a revived version of the CBS Morning News. Has stuck with its Sunday newspaper magazine supplement format since its 79 debut, especially with its focus on the fine and performing arts, and relaxed and quiet pacing. Show continues to be successful reaching 6 million viewers to date. The current version of Gottfried Reiche's Abblasen which has been theme to Sunday Morning from the start is performed by Wynton Marsalis.
CNN News Central	2023–present	CNN/HLN	Replaced CNN This Morning on the former weekday program's timeslot in late February 2024.
CNN This Morning	2022–2024	CNN/HLN	Replaced New Day and Morning Express with Robin Meade on CNN and HLN, respectively. Previously hosted on Mondays–Fridays by Poppy Harlow and Phil Mattingly.
CNN This Morning Weekend	2022–present	CNN/HLN	Hosted by Victor Blackwell and formerly with Amara Walker as co-host until 2024. Replaced New Day Weekend.
CNN This Morning with Audie Cornish	2024–present	CNN/HLN	Runs five days a week. Succeeded Early Start on CNN and HLN after expanding back to two hours.
College GameDay	1987–present	ESPN	Saturday morning program aired only during NCAA Division I Football Bowl Subdivision season, presented live on-location each week from a facility hosting a high-profile game on that day.
Despierta América	1997–present	Univision	
Early Today	1999–present	NBC	Also airs overnights competing with the CBS Overnight News and ABC's World News Now.
En la Mañana	2019–present	Estrella TV	
Fox & Friends First	2012 – present	Fox News	Two hour lead in program to the main Fox & Friends program. Airs seven days a week.
Fox & Friends	1998–present	Fox News	Airs seven days with the daily version running three hours, and the weekend version running four hours
Good Morning America	1975–present	ABC	Replaced AM America in 1975 (which only lasted ten months), and became a morning show mainstay on the ABC network. First hosted by actors David Hartman and Nancy Dussault. Hartman successfully transitioned from acting to journalism and hosted GMA for 11 years (1975-1987). Dussault was replaced by Sandy Hill in 1977, and Joan Lunden replaced Hill in 1980. Lunden stayed on GMA for 17 years, leaving the show in 1997. Both Hill and Lunden have journalism backgrounds. GMA shares its name with the lyric hook from the Steve Goodman song City of New Orleans that would be first popularized by folk rock singer Arlo Guthrie. GMA first expanded into the weekends with a Sunday only broadcast that aired from 1993 until 1999. GMA expanded into the weekends a second time with Saturday and Sunday broadcasts starting on the weekend of 4–5 September 2004.
Good Morning Football	2012–present	NFL Network	
Hoy Día	2021–present	Telemundo	Spanish counterpart to the Today show on sister network NBC.
Live with Kelly and Ryan	1983–present	Syndication	Originally titled The Morning Show when it was a local New York City program on WABC-TV before going national in 1988 and being renamed to Live that include the names of the hosts of the moment. Hosts over the years included Regis Philbin and Kathie Lee Gifford (whose "mismatch" proved to be hit with TV viewers since being parried in 1985 and ended in 2000); Kelly Ripa; Michael Strahan (who moved on to Good Morning America); and multi-media personality Ryan Seacrest. Airs after Good Morning America on ABC affiliates, but seen on other stations that are affiliated with rival networks.
Morning in America	2021–present	NewsNation	
Morning News NOW	2020–present	NBC News NOW	
Morning Joe	2007–present	MS NOW	Hosted by former Republican Congressman Joe Scarborough, who the show is named after. Co-hosted with Mika Brzezinski (Scarborough and Brzezinski were married in November 2018) and Willie Geist. Served as a replacement for Imus in the Morning which later moved to RFD-TV, then Fox Business before Don Imus ended his TV simulcast for good in 2015.
Mornings with Maria	2015–present	Fox Business	Hosted by financial news journalist and commentator Maria Bartiromo. Replaced the television simulcast of Imus In the Morning in 2015, when Don Imus choose to move out of New York City to Texas.
SportsCenter	1979–present	ESPN	Multiple editions air throughout the day.
Squawk Box	1995–present	CNBC	
Today	1952–present	NBC	The very first Breakfast/Morning Television Program in both the United States and the world. Fifth longest running American TV series. Expanding on weekends starting with a Sunday broadcast that began 20 September 1987, and adding a Saturday broadcasting that began 1 August 1992. Current anchors on the daily 7–9 a.m. hours are Savannah Guthrie and Hoda Kotb, along with news anchor Craig Melvin. and weather anchor Al Roker. The Saturday anchors on Today are Peter Alexander and Kristen Welker, and Willie Geist is the anchor on Sunday Today. Notable presenters over the years include Dave Garroway who was the founding host of the show (1952–1961), Hugh Downs (1962–1971), Barbara Walters (1966–1976), Frank McGee (1971–1974), Tom Brokaw (1976–1981), Jane Pauley (1976–1989), Bryant Gumbel (1982–1997), Deborah Norville (1990–1991), Katie Couric (1991–2006), Matt Lauer (1997–2017), Meredith Vieira (2006–2011) and Ann Curry (2011–2012).
Toon In With Me	2021–present	MeTV	Anthology series focusing on classic cartoon shorts.
Varney & Co.	2010–present	Fox Business	Hosted by longtime British-American business/political journalist and commentator, Stuart "Stu" Varney.
Way Too Early with Jonathan Lemire	2009–present	MS NOW	Early morning spinoff of Morning Joe hosted by Jonathan Lemire.
The Weekend	2024–present	MS NOW	Runs on weekends and hosted by former Republican National Committee Chair Michael Steele, Alicia Menendez and Symone Sanders-Townsend.
Worldwide Exchange	2005–present	CNBC	
Yahoo Finance Morning Brief	2018–present	Yahoo Finance	

Locally produced programs featuring a franchise title on affiliates of Fox, the CW, MyNetworkTV, independent stations and associated Big Three television networks (ABC, CBS and NBC):

- Daybreak - This title is used by WISH-TV in Indianapolis to brand its morning newscasts, and has been branded Daybreak for as long WISH-TV has produced Morning Newscasts, and when they were once affiliated with CBS. Daybreak is also used by Gray Television's KKCO/KJCT-LP in Grand Junction, Colorado.
- Good Day – Fox's local morning news show format is used by both stations that are either owned-and-operated or affiliated with the network (i.e., Good Day L.A. in Los Angeles). The program may have a different name in several markets (e.g., Fox 6 WakeUp News on WITI in Milwaukee), but the format is the same from market to market. WAGA-TV adopted the name of their local morning newscast Good Day Atlanta in 1992 while still affiliated with CBS and taking the place of the first incarnation of CBS This Morning. ABC affiliate WATN-TV in Memphis which was once affiliated with Fox uses the title Good Day Memphis for their morning newscasts.
- Good Morning [region] – used by local ABC affiliates to complement Good Morning America (e.g., Good Morning Twin Tiers on WENY in Elmira, New York). KTVK which was once an ABC affiliate from 1955 until 1996 and is now an Independent/CBS alternate station; continues to use the title Good Morning Arizona for their morning newscast that runs from 4:30 a.m. until 10:00 a.m. WHBQ-TV, a Fox affiliated station in Memphis but once affiliated with ABC uses the title Good Morning Memphis for their morning newscasts.
  - An earlier variant is A.M. [region] (such as with AM Buffalo on WKBW-TV in Buffalo, New York), which was later adapted by ABC for AM America, a short-lived morning show that aired on the network for eleven months in 1975 before it chose to adapt Cleveland affiliate WEWS' local program The Morning Exchange into the future national format for Good Morning America. The 1980s PBS program A.M. Weather also used the same title form.
- [Station Calls/Branding] Morning News – The defunct Tribune Broadcasting's local morning news show format usually seen on the company's Fox- and CW-affiliated stations (such as WPIX in New York City, New York; WGN-TV in Chicago; KTLA in Los Angeles; KCPQ in Seattle; and WXIN in Indianapolis), though this format has also been used on Fox and CW stations – as well as a few ABC, CBS and NBC stations – not owned by Tribune (such as the Fox 25 Morning News on KOKH in Oklahoma City) under a more generic title form. Tribune was purchased by Nexstar Media Group in 2019, with WPIX sold to the E. W. Scripps Company at the same time (WITI and KCPQ were sold to Fox Television Stations in March 2020), though no changes are expected to any of those programs or their titling. Scripps sold WPIX to Mission Broadcasting in 2020, which allows Nexstar to operate the station.
- [Station Calls/Branding] This Morning – used primarily on CBS owned-and-operated stations and affiliates (such as CBS 2 News This Morning on WCBS-TV in New York City). It has been used by CBS stations for their newscasts since prior to the 1999 cancellation of the first incarnation of CBS This Morning; the name and format has also been sporadically used on non-CBS affiliates. Some CBS stations renamed their program to The [Branding/Calls] Early Show to match the national title of CBS's 1999–2012 morning program.
  - A variant of this branding is simply titled Mornings, and has been adopted by CBS as the name of their current Morning program. Currently used by Scripps KNXV-TV (ABC) and sister station KASW (CW) in Phoenix for their respected morning newscast that airs on both stations.
- Today in [region] or [Branding/calls] Today – used by NBC affiliates to complement Today (such as Today in Central New York on WSTM-TV in Syracuse, New York); Fox affiliate WSVN in Miami brands its morning newscast Today in Florida, that station has used the title since 1988 when it was an NBC affiliate, even after the morning newscast on the market's NBC O&O WTVJ began to use the similar title Today in South Florida. Similarly, sister station WHDH in Boston retained its morning show title Today in New England despite losing their NBC affiliation at the start of 2017; replacement NBC O&O station WBTS-CD uses the title NBC Boston Today.
- Wake Up – also used primarily on CBS affiliates, often with the city name or local region after it (such as Wake Up Rochester on WROC-TV in Rochester, New York and Wake Up Western Slope on KREX-TV in Grand Junction, Colorado). In the example of WITI's Fox 6 WakeUp News noted above, that station has used the title since 1992 when it was a CBS affiliate, with the program adapting to the Fox local morning format after 1995. Wake Up was briefly used as the main title of the long running Captain Kangaroo children's show (which ran for 29 years on CBS from 1955 until 1984) in 1981.
- Several stations throughout the United States use their own title forms to reflect their local character; for instance, KLFY-TV in Lafayette, Louisiana titles their morning show as Passe Partout (which has been on the station since 1957) to reflect the area's Cajun/Creole roots.

==== Former ====
Program	Run	Network	Notes
AM America	1975	ABC	ABC's first attempt at a Breakfast show that premiered in January 1975. AM America featured ABC News anchor Peter Jennings, along with WABC-TV anchor Bill Beutel and Los Angeles personality Stephanie Edwards who were the show's presenters. Edwards left the program in May, followed by Beutel a few months later (and returning to WABC-TV). Replaced by Good Morning America which premiered on 3 November 1975.
A.M. Weather	1978-1995	PBS member stations	Fifteen minute morning program showing recent satellite and radar images, current weather conditions across the United States, and forecast maps (especially in terms of temperatures and precipitation). Also was known for forecasting aviation weather (locations of MVFR and IFR, aircraft icing, turbulence and winds aloft), and inclement weather (called "Weatherwatch"). A.M. Weather was also known for its frequent use of yellow pointer sticks when pointing out current/recent weather conditions and forecast predictions on the maps except for the Weatherwatch map. While many other media outlets embraced computer weather maps and graphics in the 1980s for weather forecasting use, A.M. Weather held back on fully embracing computer graphics until 1991, although they did adapt to such graphics for satellite and radar maps in the late 1980s. Produced by Maryland Public Television (MPT) and the National Oceanic and Atmospheric Administration (NOAA), featuring meteorologists who worked for NOAA. Best known presenters on A.M. Weather include Carl Weiss, Joan von Ahn and Wayne Winston. First broadcast aired on 30 October 1978. MPT ended production of the show in February 1995. Long time underwriters of A.M. Weather include the Federal Aviation Administration (FAA), Aircraft Owners and Pilots Association a.k.a. AOPA (and its Air Safety Foundation arm), Lawyer-Pilots Bar Association and the National Business Aviation Association (NBAA). Also was underwritten by various aviation-related companies including United States Aircraft Insurance Group (USAIG), Avemco Insurance Company, Showalter Flying Services (now Showalter Aviation and Marine, Inc.), Combs Gates (subsidiary of Gates Learjet, now known today as Learjet), Phillips Petroleum Company (who was involved in selling jet fuel), and Beechcraft Corporation to name a few.
AM Joy	2016-2020	MSNBC	Canceled after Joy Ann Reid moved to weeknights.
American Morning	2001–2012	CNN	Replaced by Early Start.
The Bill Press Show	2012–2014	Current TV	Moved to Free Speech TV, then Young Turks Television (YTY). Currently Bill Press does a daily podcast via his own company, Bill Press Pods
Breakfast Time	1994–1996	FX	Later moved to Fox as Fox After Breakfast (1996–1997)
CBS This Morning	1987-1999 & 2012-2021	CBS	The 1987-1999 run was replaced by The Early Show, and the 2012-2021 run was replaced by CBS Mornings and CBS Saturday Morning. It was the eighth and tenth daily morning/breakfast show to air on CBS.
CNN Daybreak	1980–2005	CNN	From 2001 CNN Daybreak aired as the network's early breakfast programme
The Daily Buzz	2002–2015	Syndicated	Current incarnation of the program runs as a one-hour weekly show (2017–present)
Early Edition	mid 1990s - 2001	CNN	
The Early Show	1999–2012	CBS	Replaced the first incarnations of CBS This Morning and CBS News Saturday Morning respectfully in 1999. Replaced by the second incarnation of CBS This Morning. It was the ninth daily morning/breakfast show to air on CBS.
Early Start	2012–2024	CNN	Retitled CNN This Morning with Kasie Hunt, later CNN This Morning with Audie Cornish.
Early Start with Rahel Solomon	2025–2026	CNN	
Farm Day	1984-1987	PBS member stations	Daily 15 minute morning agribusiness news program produced by Maryland Public Television. Underwritten by the Farm Credit System and anchored by veteran farm journalists Glenn Tolbert and Charlotte Nichols. Aired as part of a half hour package with A.M. Weather, and a brief commentary from Baltimore's Don Spatz of WBAL Radio and The Baltimore Sun that aired in-between the programs.
Golic and Wingo	2017-2020	ESPNews (2004–2005); ESPN2 (2006–2020)	Also simulcasted on ESPN Radio. Successor to Mike & Mike, which aired since 2004
Good Morning! with Will Rogers Jr.	1956	CBS	Replaced the original version of The Morning Show which the eldest of son of humorist Will Rogers, Sr. hosted. Replaced by a different version of The Morning Show featuring a variety show format hosted by Jimmy Dean. This was the second daily Morning/Breakfast program to air on CBS.
Imus in the Morning	1996–2015	MSNBC; RFD-TV; FBN	Began as a radio program in 1968 heard in various radio markets in the western United States (along with a first stint in Cleveland), before Don Imus settled in the New York City radio market at WNBC (Imus did a second stint in Cleveland from 1977 to 1979, until NBC management rehired him to work at WNBC once again). Imus In The Morning was syndicated nationally on radio starting in 1993, and picked up a TV simulcast on MSNBC in 1996. MSNBC canceled the TV simulcast of Imus in 2007 due to his remarks he made about the Rutgers women's basketball team (WFAN AM 660 later terminated Imus). RFD-TV picked up the Imus TV simulcast after Imus was picked up by WABC AM 770 in December 2007. Imus switched from to RFD-TV (last show aired on 28 August 2009) to Fox Business Network in October 2009. Don Imus ended his TV simulcast in 2015 and moved to Texas. Imus ended his radio show and retired in March 2018. Don Imus died on 27 December 2019, at 79 years of age.
In The Loop with Betty Liu	2013–2015	Bloomberg Television	Replaced by Market Movers. Liu continued to work for Bloomberg Television until 2018.
The 'Lights	2012–2013	NBCSN	Anchored by ring announcer David Diamante who was heard but not seen. Presented as an alternative to ESPN's long running SportsCenter. Originally placed on hiatus in 2013 during the Stanley Cup Playoffs for a retool, but was canceled altogether.
The Morning Program	1987	CBS	Hosted by Mariette Hartley and Rolland Smith, featuring stand-up comedian Bob Saget and weather forecaster Mark McEwen. Entertainment/News/Comedy hybrid show. Replaced the 1982-87 incarnation of the CBS Morning News on 12 January 1987. Later replaced by the first incarnation of CBS This Morning on 30 November 1987. Saget left the show in the middle of its run and soon joined the cast of the sitcom Full House. McEwen was held over and did weather forecasts for CBS This Morning. The Morning Program was the seventh daily Morning/Breakfast show to air on CBS.
The Morning Show	1954-1956	CBS	CBS's very first attempt at a Morning/Breakfast show in the 1950s, that was similar to NBC's Today. First hosted by Walter Cronkite, then by various other hosts including Jack Paar, John Henry Faulk and Dick Van Dyke. Originally ran for two hours, but reduced to one hour in October 1955, when CBS accommodated the children's television series Captain Kangaroo starting Bob Keeshan as the title character (also the show's creator). Show was replaced by Good Morning! with Will Rogers Jr. in 1956. The Morning Show returned to CBS with a different format in April 1957 as a variety show hosted by Country music singer Jimmy Dean. The Dean version of The Morning Show ended in December 1957, and is counted as the third daily breakfast/morning show to air on CBS. CBS would not attempt another breakfast/morning show for adults until 1963.
Morning Express with Robin Meade	2005-2022	HLN	Replaced by a simulcast CNN This Morning
Morning Joe First Look	2004–2020	MSNBC	Replaced with a revival of Way Too Early.
The Morning Show with Mike and Juliet	2007–2009	Syndicated	Syndicated by the Fox Broadcasting Company. Both Mike Jerrick and Juliet Huddy hosted shows on sister channel Fox News. Jerrick currently co-hosts Good Day Philadelphia on Fox O&O WTXF. Huddy returned to Fox News, and later worked at WNYW in New York.
NBC News at Sunrise	1983–1999	NBC	First anchored by Connie Chung (1983-1986). Other anchors of note Bob Jamieson (1986-1987), Deborah Norville (1987-1989), John Palmer (1989-1990), Faith Daniels (1990–91), Ann Curry (1991-96), and Linda Vester (1996–98)
New Day	2013-2022	CNN	Replaced by CNN This Morning
Un Nuevo Día	2008–2021	Telemundo	Formerly titled Levantate (2008–2012)
Starting Point	2012–2013	CNN	Replaced by Early Start.
The Stephanie Miller Show	2012–2014	Current TV	Now on Free Speech TV
That Morning Show	2009	E!	
World News Today	2006–2010	BBC America & BBC World News	Now an afternoon / early evening programme at weekends
Your Morning with Connie Colla and Greg Coy		CN8	
Your Weather Today	2001–2014	The Weather Channel	Replaced by America's Morning Headquarters.
Your World This Morning	2013–2016	Al Jazeera America	
Wake Up with Al	2009–2015	The Weather Channel	

=== Uruguay ===
==== Current ====
Programme	Network
5 Sentidos	Canal 5
8AM	Channel 4
Arriba gente	Channel 10
La mañana en casa	Channel 10
Con buena onda	Red Charrúa
Cambiando el Aire	Canal 5
El mañanero	La Tele
Arriba Uruguay	Uruvisión
Desayunos informales	Teledoce
Día a Día	VTV
Mañana Vemos	Nueve TV
Uruguay de Mañana	TCC

==== Former ====
Programme	Network
Buen Día	Channel 4
Buen Día Uruguay	Channel 4
Hola vecinos	Canal 10

=== Venezuela ===
==== Current ====
Programme	Network
Un Momento Diferente	Canal I
Portadas	Venevisión
Primera Página	Globovisión

==== Former ====
Programme	Network
Lo que ellas quieren	La Tele

=== Vietnam ===
==== Current ====
Programme	Run	Network
Cà phê sáng với VTV3	2011–present	VTV3
Chào buổi sáng	1995–present	VTV1
Nhịp đập 360 độ thể thao	2007–present	VTV3
Tài chính Kinh doanh	2011–present	VTV1
Sáng phương Nam	2011–present	VTV9
Nhịp sống hôm nay	2019–present	SCTV4
Tin buổi sáng	2001 - present	HTV9
60 giây	2016–present	HTV7, HTV9
Người đưa tin 24h	2017–present	THVL

==== Former ====
Programme	Run	Network
Bản tin sáng	2014 - 2015	VTC1
Cafe ngày mới	2018 - 2025	VTC9
Cuộc sống 24h	2010 - 2025	VTC1, VTC14
Giai điệu ngày mới	2007 - 2011	VTC1
Let's Cà phê	2008 - 2019	VTC9, SCTV4

== See also ==
- News broadcasting
- Prime time – the evening equivalent of breakfast television/morning show

== Notes ==
Preceded by Overnight graveyard slot	Television dayparts 5 am – 10 am	Succeeded by Daytime television
