= A Morning with Farah =

Pakistani breakfast television show

- Also known as: Morning with Farah
- Genre: Breakfast television
- Directed by: Zagham ul Islam
- Presented by: Farah Hussain
- Country of origin: Pakistan
- Original language: Urdu

Production
- Executive producer: Farah Hussain
- Running time: 55 minutes

Original release
- Network: ATV
- Release: 2005 – 6 September 2015

A Morning with Farah or Morning with Farah is a Pakistani breakfast television show. The show originates from Islamabad and it is aired on a private television channel ATV from Monday to Friday from 09:05 AM to 11:00 AM Pakistan Standard Time. Farah Hussain is the host and executive producer and Zagham ul Islam is the director of the show.

== Format ==
Presented as a light interview chat show, each episode has a live telephone call and features personalities, fitness, self grooming and fashion tips, jewelry designs, recipes etc.

=== Celebrity guests ===
Celebrities that have been featured on the show include:

Politicians

- Imran Khan
- Chaudhry Shujaat Hussain
- Ameen Faheem
- Javed Hashmi
- Firdous Ashiq Awan
- Khush Bakht Shujaat

Actors

- Babrik Shah
- Mustafa Qureshi

Musicians

- Mehdi Hassan
- Ghulam Ali
- Shaukat Ali
- Ali Haider
- Arshad Mahmood

Health

- Hakeem Rizwan Hafeez Malik

=== Celebration of Islamic festivals ===
This show celebrates Islamic festivals like Ramadan, Jashne eid milad unnabi, Moharram with great respect.
