= NEXtv =

Nex
- Country: Panama
- Broadcast area: Panama City

Programming
- Language: Spanish
- Picture format: 1080i HDTV

Ownership
- Owner: Compañía Digital de TV
- Sister channels: Más 23 TV; Viva Canal 33

History
- Launched: September 23, 2012; 13 years ago
- Former names: RCM Canal 21 (2010-2012); TVO (2006-2009); RCM (2000-2006)

Links
- Website: www.nexpanama.com

Availability

Terrestrial
- Analog VHF: Channel 21 (listings may vary)
- Digital terrestrial television: Channel 49

Nex is a private Panamanian broadcaster based in Panama City. It broadcasts in Panama City on analog UHF channel 21 and channel 49 in DVB-T, with several repeaters across Panama. It is owned by Compañía Digital de TV.

== History ==
UHF channel 21 started test broadcasts on 20 March 1996 as RTV; said station's regular broadcasts began in April. It was promoted as a "dynamic, independent, non-partisan" channel.

In July 2005, the frequency was occupied by RCM Fem, a female-oriented channel, to fill a void in the over-the-air TV landscape. At launch, it offered seven telenovelas, all of them Argentine and from Telefe's catalog. There were also ten original programs and relays of the news bulletins from RCM News.

RCM Television was bought by Ricardo Francolini and former Panamanian president Ricardo Martinelli in September 2012 and renamed the channel to NEXtv.

== Programming ==
Programming consists of domestically produced variety programs, newscasts, nightly political talk shows, along with telenovelas and television series mostly from Colombia.

== Sister Stations ==
- Viva Canal 33 (television station, religious programming)
- Más 23 TV (television station, music videos)
- KW Continente 95.9 FM (partner FM radio station, broadcasts from Nextv facilities)
