= Buen Día =

Buen Día is a Costa Rican morning show that airs on Teletica. The program started airing in 1998, and currently airs from 8:00 a.m. to 10:00 am on weekdays. It is hosted by presenters Nancy Dobles, Randall Salazar, Omar Cascante, and Thais Alfaro. The program includes cooking recipes, modelling of seasonal items, interviews with experts, and more.

The show has had many different presenters, such as Édgar Silva, Adriana Durán, Rodrigo Villalobos, Walter Campos, Viviana Calderón, Pablo Rodríguez and Vanessa González.
