= Huomenta Suomi =

Finnish breakfast television show

Huomenta Suomi (lit. 'Good Morning Finland') is a Finnish breakfast television, originally broadcast on Kolmoskanava, then on MTV3. The show was launched on December 1, 1989. From January 2020 to December 2022, the show's name was Uutisaamu (in English News-morning). The program airs from 6:25 to 9:05 AM, with news and weather every half hour.

== Broadcasters ==
- Ivan Puopolo
- Kirsi Alm-Siira

== Weekend presenters ==
- Joanna Kuvaja
- Antero Mertaranta
- Ira Hammermann
- Aki Linnanahde
- Niina Backman
- Lorenz Backman

== Weather presenters ==
- Liisa Rintaniemi
- Pekka Pouta
- Aleksi Jokela
- Markus Mäntykannas
- Miina Manninen
