= Édgar Silva =

Costa Rican journalist (born 1967)

Édgar Silva (born Édgar Arturo Silva Loáiciga in October 1967 in Liberia, Guanacaste, Costa Rica) is a Costa Rican journalist who works for Teletica, the largest TV station in Costa Rica.

He is known for been the major referent of journalism of his country.

His major role in the station since November 1998 has been co-hosting daily-morning show "Buen Día" with Adriana Durán, as well as hosting the New Year's-coming show "El Chinamo" for the last couple of years.

== Early life ==
Silva spent his childhood in the city of Liberia, in the northwestern province of Guanacaste. He attended Ascensión Esquivel Elementary school during first grade, and John F. Kennedy Laboratory School from second until sixth grade where he finished his elementary education. He attended Liberia Laboratory Liceum during his high school years.

== Journalism in Costa Rica ==
After graduating from high school, Silva moved to San Jose to study at the University of Costa Rica, where he graduated with a BA in Journalism. Even before graduating, he worked as a reporter for the TV show "En Vivo at 5", and since 1991 as a news reporter for Telenoticias.

Whilst working for Telenoticias he covered many different subjects: politics, economy, legislation, community support and important events, although he is better known for his documentaries as well as his role as an entertainment reporter. During 4 years he interviewed many known artists such as Ricky Martin, Alejandro Fernández, Gloria Estefan, Julio Iglesias, Yuri, Chayanne, Manuel Mijares and many others, both in Costa Rica and other countries. Germany, Spain, Peru, Guatemala, Honduras, Nicaragua, Panama as well as most of the United States, are some of the countries he has visited along his reporter career with Teletica.

He covered the Limon earthquake in 1991, the kidnapping of the Supreme Court magistrates, and the Presidential elections of 1994, 1998 and 2006, normally sent to report from. Since 1992, he has been in charge of the coverage of all space flights in which Costa Rican-American astronaut Franklin Chang-Díaz had participated. He also reported the arrival of Pathfinder space vehicle to Mars from United States. Other assignments include the Annular Eclipse on December 14, 2001 broadcast live from Nosara Beach, Guanacaste. Conduction of the Miss Costa Rica 2004 beauty contest alongside Mariamalia Jacobo was praised by the entertainment media.

Silva has received many awards in his career as a journalist, such as the "Best Documentary for Central American Television" prize given by Florida International University in 1992. ACAN-EFE has honored him for different special reports in 1992 and 1997.

Edgar Silva, married Karla Montero in April 2001. He currently resides in Heredia but he often visits his hometown, Liberia, to visit his mother. He has said to support "Municipal Liberia", Liberia's soccer team in the Costa Rican National Soccer Championship.
