= Yonhap News TV =

South Korean television network

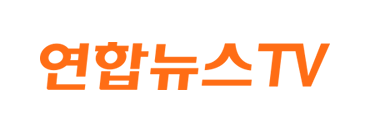
- Yonhap News TV logo
- Native name: 연합뉴스TV
- Type: Private
- Founded: March 15, 2011; 15 years ago in Seoul, South Korea
- Headquarters: Yulgok-ro, Jongno District, Seoul, South Korea
- Key people: Seong Ghi-hong (President & CEO); Choo Seung-ho (Head of Press); Maeng Chan-hyung (Press Chief)
- Total equity: 310,000,000,000 won (2014)
- Owner: Yonhap News Agency (28.01%); Eulji General Hospital (9.92%); Hwasung Development (8.26%); Yesol Savings Bank (7.44%); Others (46.37%)
- Website: www.yonhapnewstv.co.kr

Yonhap News TV (Korean: 연합뉴스TV; stylized in all caps) is a South Korean pay television network and broadcasting company, owned by the Yonhap News Agency-led consortium. It began broadcasting on 1 December 2011. Yonhap News TV started broadcasting with four new South Korean nationwide generalist cable TV networks. Those are JoongAng Ilbo's JTBC, Dong-A Ilbo's Channel A, Chosun Ilbo's TV Chosun, and Maeil Kyungje's MBN in 2011. The four new networks supplement existing conventional free-to-air TV networks like KBS, MBC, SBS, and other smaller channels launched following deregulation in 1990.

== History ==
- 22 July 2009 - Amendment of Media law passed the South Korean national assembly to deregulate the media market of South Korea.
- 31 December 2010 - JTBC, TV Chosun, MBN, and Channel A elected as a General Cable Television Channel Broadcasters and Yonhap News TV elected as an All-News Cable Channel Broadcaster.
- 1 December 2011 – Yonhap News TV begins broadcasting.

== See also ==
- Yonhap News Agency
