= Bloomberg TV Bulgaria =

- Country: Bulgaria
- Headquarters: Sofia, Bulgaria

Programming
- Language(s): Bulgarian
- Picture format: 1080i HDTV (downscaled to 16:9 576i for the SDTV feed

Ownership
- Owner: Investor.BG AD
- Sister channels: Bulgaria ON AIR

History
- Launched: 19 October 2015

Links
- Website: www.bloombergtv.bg

Bloomberg TV Bulgaria is a Bulgarian television channel with focus on economics which was launched on 19 October 2015.

The television is part of Bloomberg's international channel group and is owned by Investor TV Ltd. (Investor TV EOOD), a subsidiary of Investor.BG EAD which also includes the national TV channel Bulgaria ON AIR (called MSAT in former times), as well as the "Investor Media Group" online platforms like Investor.bg, Dnes.bg, Imoti.net, Puls.bg, and others.

The channel focuses on economic and financial news, market information, and interviews and business analysis from Bulgaria and the world. It also broadcasts original Bloomberg Television productions, including success stories, documentaries and economic broadcasts. It presents news from the markets in daily direct contact with journalists, experts and analysts at Bloomberg in London, New York, Hong Kong and Tokyo.

== History ==
Bloomberg TV Bulgaria was launched on 19 October 2015 as a result of the partnership between Bulgaria ON AIR and Bloomberg Television in 2013. Until then, Bulgaria ON AIR broadcast content within the partnership with Bloomberg until October 2015, when the channel was profiled to a polythematic one and the economic program was transferred to the new Bloomberg TV Bulgaria channel. The TV team consists of economic journalists who worked for Bulgaria ON AIR before becoming a political channel, as well as by the editors of the financial news and information website Investor.bg.

== Distribution ==
Bloomberg TV Bulgaria is distributed in cable, satellite and IPTV networks and is available online on its website in the territory of Bulgaria.
