= TELE1 =

Turkish television channel

- Country: Turkey
- Affiliates: Show TV
- Headquarters: Sarıyer, İstanbul

Programming
- Picture format: 576i (16:9 SDTV); 1080i (16:9 HDTV)

Ownership
- Owner: Merdan Yanardağ; ABC Radyo, Televizyon ve Dijital Yayıncılık A.Ş.

History
- Founded: 9 Ocak 2017 (as Kültür Türk); 4 Şubat 2017 (as Tele1); 9 Mayıs 2019 (HD service)
- Former names: Kültür Türk

Links
- Website: tele1.com.tr

TELE1 is a news channel that started broadcasting on January 9, 2017. Its editor-in-chief is Merdan Yanardağ. Due to the delay in RTÜK approval, it started using the TELE1 logo instead of the "Kültür Türk" logo on February 4, 2017.

== Trustee Scandal ==
Due to political polarization in Turkey, Tele1 has been one of the most-watched anti-government television channels. However, in October 2025, the Istanbul Chief Public Prosecutor’s Office appointed a trustee to TELE1.
