= Bulgaria ON AIR =

Bulgarian media group

- Type: Broadcast television
- Country: Bulgaria
- Broadcast area: Bulgaria
- Network: Bulgaria ON AIR
- Headquarters: 1 Brussels Blvd., Sofia

Programming
- Language: Bulgarian
- Picture format: 16:9 SD

Ownership
- Owner: Investor.BG EAD
- Sister channels: Bloomberg TV Bulgaria

History
- Launched: 5 September 2011
- Former names: Mustang TV (1994–1999); MSAT (1999–2011)

Links
- Website: www.bgonair.bg

Availability

Terrestrial
- MUX 2: Channel 5

Bulgaria ON AIR is a Bulgarian national television, launched on 9 September 2011. It was originally established under the brand Bulgaria ON AIR Media Group, consisting of 3 television channels - the flagship Bulgaria ON AIR TV (formerly "MSAT" and "Mustang TV"), a business and economic-based Bloomberg TV Bulgaria (in partnership with Bloomberg Group) and the local Varna-based channel Cherno More TV; two radio stations - Radio Bulgaria ON AIR and Alpha Radio, an inflight magazine - Bulgaria ON AIR Magazine.

== Television channels ==
The flagship channel was first launched in 1994 as "Mustang TV" - a regional TV channel in Varna. In 1999, after it started satellite broadcasting, the channel was rebranded as "MSAT". In 2009 the channel broadcasting was moved to Sofia at the Bulgaria Air airlines headquarters, from where it began building its national terrestrial network. In March 2010, television began broadcasting in 15 cities in Bulgaria. In Varna it was replaced by the regional TV channel "Cherno More TV", formerly "Varna TV" and "RD TV". On 9 September 2011 the channel was rebranded as a business network under the name "Bulgaria ON AIR". On 21 September 2015, the channel was relaunched as a flagship television channel after the media group launched "Bloomberg TV Bulgaria" as a business-economic network in partnership with Bloomberg Group.

== Radio stations ==
On 22 March 1996 in Varna was launched the radio station of "Mustang Holding" - "Alpha Radio". From the beginning the radio was with a news profile. After its inception it began broadcasting in Dobrich, Shumen and Varna. On March 17, 2007, it began broadcasting in Sofia and quickly became a national radio station, relaunching itself as an electronic music dance radio. In 2009 the radio was integrated into the media holding of "MSAT" and Bulgaria Air. On 9 September 2011 the radio station was rebranded as the business radio "Bulgaria ON AIR" and integrated with the television channel of the same name. "Alpha Radio" was kept as an online-based electronic and dance music radio station. The radio was briefly launched terrestrially in 2012 in Pazardzhik, Pernik and Targovishte as a placeholder, until at the end of 2014 "Bulgaria ON AIR Radio" also took those frequencies.

== Press magazines ==
Bulgaria ON AIR operates the inflight magazine of the same names as a magazine for the Bulgaria Air airlines flight. Its first edition was issued in 2003. The magazine is definitely the most widely read business and lifestyle magazine in Bulgaria. an updated business magazine version of it was launched in April 2011 with the establishment of the media group, alongside the TV channel and the radio station. It is an extended version of the flight magazine which is distributed in hotels and shopping centers.

== Internet sites ==
In 2013 the media group acquired Investor Media Group - an online-based media group that operates various media sites. Among the portals that the group operates are the economic based "investor.bg", a news website - "dnes.bg", a sports website - "gol.bg", two female-oriented sites - "tialoto.bg" and "az-jenata.bg", a healthcare website - "puls.bg", the teenage online community website "teenproblem.net", a household portal - 'imoti.net", a children-based portal - "az-deteto.bg", the motor-based website "automedia.bg", the online catalog "start.bg", the blog-hosting service "blog.bg", and others.
