= Rizwan Hafeez Malik =

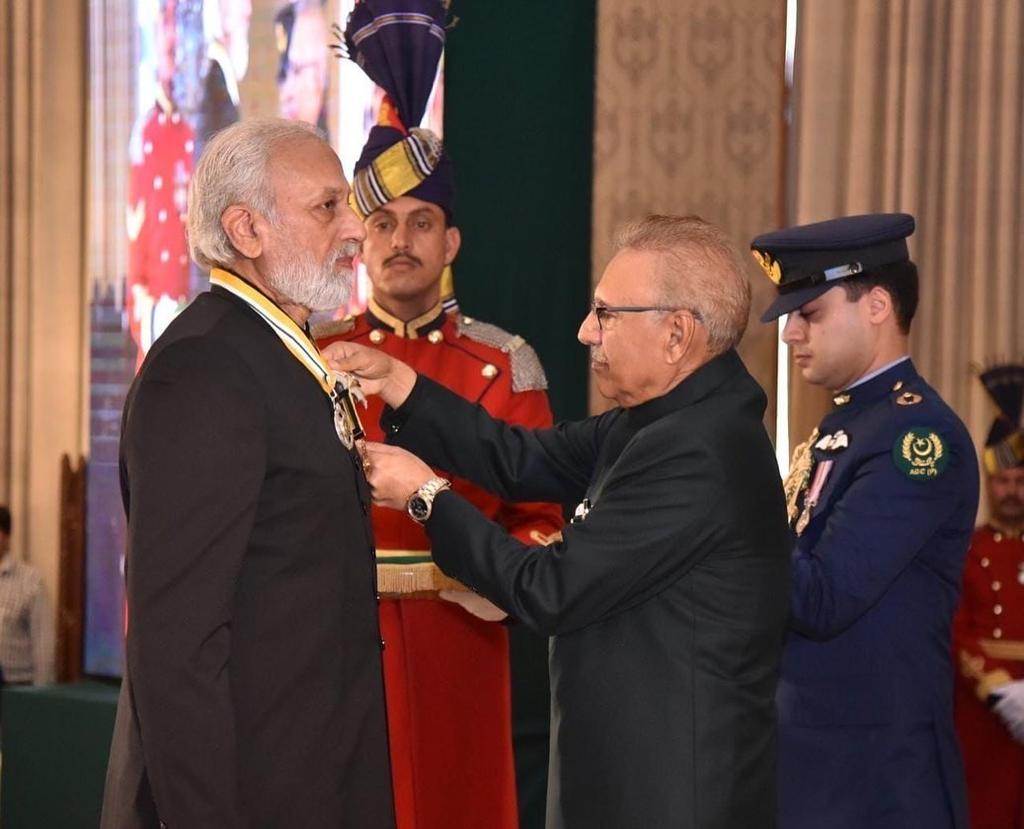
- Arif Alvi awarding Hilal-i-Imtiaz to Hakeem Rizwan Hafeez Malik.

Former Administrator/Authority, Health Ministry of Pakistan
- In office 2010–2013

Former President of the National Council for Tibb (NCT), Pakistan
- In office 2002–2007

Personal details
- Born: Rizwan Hafeez Malik; 22 September 1956 (age 69) Lahore, Pakistan
- Profession: Medical researcher
- Known for: Unani medicine
- National Awards: Hilal-i-Imtiaz (2023); Sitara-i-Imtiaz (2013); Tamgha-e-Imtiaz (2007)

Rizwan Hafeez Malik SI TI (Urdu: حکیم رضوان حفیظ ملک; born 22 September 1956) is a Pakistani medical researcher, former President of National Council for Tibb and former Administrator/Authority of National Council for Tibb, Ministry of Health Government of Pakistan.

== Career ==
Hakeem Rizwan Hafeez Malik is a practitioner of Tibb-e-Unani in Pakistan.

== Awards and recognition ==
- Sitara-i-Imtiaz (Star of Distinction) by the President of Pakistan in 2013.
- Tamgha-i-Imtiaz (Medal of Distinction) by the Government of Pakistan in 2007.
- Hilal-i-Imtiaz (Crescent of Excellence) by the President of Pakistan in 2023.
