= A.M. Weather =

American TV weather program

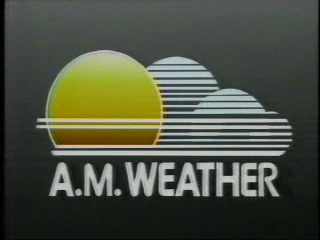
- Title sequence, used from 1987 to 1990.
- Directed by: Jimm Revelle
- Presented by: Carl Weiss; Joan von Ahn; Ray Suarez; Wayne Winston, et al
- Theme music composer: Mark Roumelis; Don Barto
- Country of origin: United States
- Original language: English
- No. of seasons: 17

Production
- Executive producers: Lori Evans; Kay Bond
- Producers: Dorothy Peterson; Kay Bond; Christina Bildstein
- Production location: Owings Mills, Maryland
- Camera setup: Multi-camera
- Running time: 15 minutes
- Production companies: Maryland Public Television; NOAA

Original release
- Network: PBS member stations
- Release: October 30, 1978 – February 3, 1995

Related
- Aviation Weather

A.M. Weather is an American weather news program that was syndicated to PBS member stations throughout the United States from October 30, 1978, to February 3, 1995. Produced by Maryland Public Television (MPT) in cooperation with the National Oceanic and Atmospheric Administration (NOAA), it featured observational summaries and detailed forecasts for aircraft pilots and the general public, presented by meteorologists from NOAA and its National Environmental Satellite Service (NESS) unit.

The 15-minute program, recorded each morning at 6:45 and 8:45 a.m. Eastern Time from MPT's studios in Owings Mills, Maryland and distributed to public television stations throughout the morning as required for each time zone, aired Monday through Friday mornings, typically at the top of or fifteen minutes past the half-hour and often following sign-on and often following sign-on, depending on local scheduling.

== Overview ==
A.M. Weather originally premiered in June 1972 as Aviation Weather, (Note: Maryland Public Television refers to the predecessor program as Aviation and Marine Weather in official production records; most aviation industry publications generally use the title Aviation Weather in references to the program.) a half-hour program airing on Thursday and Friday evenings that provided observations and prognostic forecasts catering to pilots and aviation professionals, presented by off-camera meteorological personnel from the Federal Aviation Administration (FAA), as well as feature segments concerning general aviation, aircraft operations, pilot training, and safety issues. Funding shortfalls would result in this version of the program—which, like its successor, predated the May 1982 launch of The Weather Channel (TWC)—concluding after a four-year run in 1976.

In 1978, NOAA and the National Weather Service (NWS) implemented regulations requiring its personnel to provide live routine weather forecasts on television and radio broadcasts, including NOAA Weather Radio. In compliance with this rule, NOAA partnered with the Maryland Center for Public Broadcasting (renamed Maryland Public Television in 1984) to produce a new version of Aviation Weather, structured as a 15-minute early morning program with an expanded focus on the general public (including the farming and marine communities) as well as the aviation community. Premiering on October 30 of that year on approximately 145 public television stations, this incarnation—titled A.M. Weather and expanded to a five-day-a-week program—was originally anchored by NOAA meteorologists H. Michael Mogil, Rich Warren (both from the NWS) and Dale Bryan (from the National Environmental Satellite Service), on an alternating basis. The program usually employed a two-anchor format, with one meteorologist handling general weather observations and forecasts, and the other concentrating on aviation conditions and the “WeatherWatch” segment.

For much of the program’s early years, the overlays used for the forecast and current weather maps were made on light tables by production graphic artists; each layer placed onto the maps utilized cutouts made using X-Acto knives, grease pencils (mainly to render areas of precipitation, turbulence, icing, and weather alerts) and magnetic symbols on transparent film. While many television outlets began using computerized graphics for their weather presentations starting in the 1980s, A.M. Weather held back on fully embracing computer graphics, continuing to utilize magnet boards and printed cel overlays for its observation and forecast maps until 1991, when it commissioned Weather Services International (WSI) to use its television weather graphics system for the forecast presentation. However, in the early 1980s, the program began incorporating chromakey overlays for aviation segments, transitioned from videotaping digitally scanned satellite photographs arranged in sequential order to employing a videodisc system to generate satellite loops, and implemented computerized satellite and radar imagery provided via dial-up connection by Kavouras and its Radac Color Weather Radar system.

A.M. Weather aired its final edition on February 3, 1995. While MPT attributed the cancellation to budgetary concerns and an unsuccessful effort to cover production and satellite uplink costs through additional funding from other PBS stations, longtime show producer Kay Bond (who, in an interview with aviation newsmagazine AOPA Pilot, disclosed that an unnamed aviation firm had agreed to help provide approximately $50,000 in grants to fund the program just before it was cancelled) suggested that the decision was primarily motivated by MPT's desire to expand on its morning business news collaboration with Bloomberg L.P., which included the syndicated Bloomberg Business News, a repackaged half-hour daily morning simulcast of fledgling financial news channel Bloomberg Information TV. (A.M. Weather carrier stations that did not pick up the Bloomberg program chose to replace it with the Morning Business Report, a 15-minute companion program to the Nightly Business Report that was distributed by American Public Television alongside Miami PBS station WPBT from January 1994 to December 2002.)

South Carolina Educational Television (SCETV) entered into discussions with The Weather Channel to develop an aviation-focused weather program that would be syndicated to PBS stations that carried A.M. Weather. While plans called for the new program to debut as early as late March 1995, this production partnership never materialized. (TWC later reintroduced an aviation weather segment, which it originally offered from 1982 to 1989, that aired as part of its morning programming from September 1995 to December 1996.)

== Format ==
The program typically began with a satellite and radar segment. The satellite portion showcased static infrared imagery and 24-hour composite loops of the contiguous United States, along with selected regions of the country and, during the Atlantic and Central Pacific hurricane seasons, tropical development areas as needed; the radar summary highlighted areas of precipitation impacting the U.S. mainland and specific regions as needed, gathered from facsimile radar charts from NOAA and, from 1983 onward, the WSI PilotBrief service as well as local National Weather Service radars, before transitioning to WSI’s NOWrad composite product in 1991. (Until the early 1990s, the satellite segment was occasionally excluded in the event of technical problems impacting the transmission of GOES imagery.) This was followed by a national current weather summary, outlining the positions of frontal boundaries and areas of precipitation, fog, haze or smoke, and summarizing the highest and lowest temperatures observed across the U.S. about two hours (or 45 minutes from 1991 onward) before the day's broadcast was recorded. (These segments were presented in the opposite order until 1988; temperature extremes were denoted on the current surface map until September 1985 and were read aloud exclusively thereafter.)

The segment progression continued with two forecast segments. The national forecast outlined expected weather conditions for the next 2½ days (extending to 3½ days on Thursdays and Fridays to provide an overview of the upcoming weekend’s weather), high and low temperatures and estimated precipitation amounts for the next 24 hours (the former being extended to two days starting in 1991), and specialty outlooks when necessary (including weekly, 30-day, and 90-day temperature and precipitation outlooks from the Climate Analysis Center [CAC] on a recurring basis, soil temperature and Crop Moisture Index data from the CAC each week during the late winter and the spring growing season, and snow depth analysis from the National Operational Hydrologic Remote Sensing Center [NOHRSC] during the winter months). The aviation forecast—compiled from WSI and Contel/GTE’s respective pilot briefing products—outlined areas subject to MVFR and IFR flight regulations due to low cloud ceilings and/or reduced visibilities, as well as information on hazardous aircraft icing, turbulence, and winds aloft at heights of 2,000 ft AGL; and 10,000, 18,000 and 34,000 (or when necessary, 39,000) ft AMSL; the presenting meteorologist often emphasizes that the information provided in the segment was intended for planning and situational awareness, rather than acting as a substitute for official preflight weather briefings.

Each edition usually concluded with "WeatherWatch”, an inclement weather report summarizing active weather watches, warnings and advisories around the time of recording for the U.S. mainland and nearby coastal waters (and from 1991 onwards, Environment Canada alerts for the lower Canadian provincial mainland and coastal regions) and, when applicable, the day’s severe thunderstorm outlook as issued by the National Severe Storms Forecast Center (NSSFC). Viewers watching over Maryland Public Television saw a supplemental report delivered by one of the hosting meteorologists immediately after the national program, providing current conditions and an extended forecast for the state and neighboring areas of Delaware, West Virginia, Virginia, and Pennsylvania, as well as a marine forecast for the Chesapeake Bay.

Rather than appear on camera in front of a wall map or chroma-key wall to illustrate the weather information being presented, A.M. Weather meteorologists highlighted current and forecast conditions on surface maps, as well as radar and satellite images, using a yellow pointer, a signature aspect of the program throughout its 17-year run; however, the pointer was not used during the closing “WeatherWatch” segment. The program was notable among televised weather broadcasts for incorporating annotated observation symbols and isothermic contour lines typically used in surface maps and radar charts to indicate weather conditions for public use, including surface weather plot symbols to represent types of precipitation and other weather phenomena, PIREP turbulence symbols, freezing level height lines, and numerical cloud top and turbulence height measurements (expressed in thousands of feet above ground level, omitting the two ending digits).

== Production and funding ==
Hosts included NOAA meteorologists Carl Weiss, Joan von Ahn, Ray Suarez and Wayne Winston, as well as H. Michael Mogil, Rich Warren, Dale Bryan, Barry Richwein and John Sokich. Other notable substitute hosts included Regis Walter, Steve Zubrick (now president of the National Weather Association), Gary Petti (a meteorologist with National Weather Service and National Environmental Satellite, Data, and Information Service (NESDIS), now retired), and George Lessens (later the chief meteorologist at WZZM in Grand Rapids, Michigan, now retired).

Funding was provided by various aviation-related companies and government agencies, including the Federal Aviation Administration, the Aircraft Owners and Pilots Association (and its Air Safety Foundation arm), Phillips Petroleum Company, Gorman-Rupp pumps, Hilton Hotels Corporation, the National Business Aviation Association (then known as the National Business Aircraft Association), the Lawyer-Pilots Bar Association, Orlando, Florida-based fixed-base operator Showalter Flying Services, Republic Airlines, Beech Aircraft Corporation, and Combs Gates, among others.
