= RCM Television =

Panama City; Panama
- Channels: Analog: 21 UHF; Digital: 49 DVB-T

Ownership
- Owner: Grupo Mix Holding; Frequencias Asociadas
- Sister stations: Mix TV 33

History
- First air date: January 1, 2010
- Last air date: October 30, 2012
- Former call signs: RCM Canal 21; TVO

Technical information
- Translator(s): (Ch.21) Chiriqui, Bocas (Ch.33) Azuero, Cocle (Ch.21) Colon, Darien (Ch.21) Veraguas

RCM Television is a media group, and is headquartered in Panama City, Panama, It handles two TV frequencies, Channel 21 (flagship) and 33; three radio stations: RCM Radio, Blast, La Tipik. The stations broadcasts in NTSC format and in Panama City also in DVB-T format.

== History ==
In June 2006, Cadena Millenium decides to sell part of its portfolio of media, the entrepreneur Noel Riande paid 20 million dollars. The sale included television channels RCM Canal 21, RCM Mundo Channel 33 and Sol FM station. Noel Riande renamed channels with TVO for Channel 21 and ShopTV 33.

In late 2009, Riande decides to sell the channels to Mix Holdings Group for 80% stake of Riande Productions, and that's how you start a new transformation of the television company.

Also radio stations belonging to Mix Holdings Group, Radio Mix, Blast and La Tipik are now part of the media group.

They have also ventured into the sport, covering Panamanian Baseball in 2011, exclusive Argentina Copa America 2011 and Colombian Soccer League.

== NEX TV ==
On October 31, 2012 station was relaunched as Nex TV, to remove the news channel tag from the station with new ownership, also music video channel +23 join the group.
