= Perdue =

Perdue may refer to:

- Perdue (surname)
- Rural Municipality of Perdue No. 346, Saskatchewan, Canada
  - Perdue, Saskatchewan, Canada
- Perdue Farms, an American chicken-farming corporation
- Perdue School of Business, in Salisbury University, Salisbury, Maryland

== See also ==
- Purdue (disambiguation)
