= Perdue (surname) =

Perdue is a surname of English and Irish origin. It comes from Old French's par Dieu or 'by God', which was adopted into Middle English as an altered form. Notable people with the surname include:

- Arthur Perdue, American businessman, founder of Perdue Farms
- Bev Perdue (born 1948), American politician from North Carolina
- Bolo Perdue (1916–1988), American football end
- David Perdue (born 1949), American politician from Georgia
- Derelys Perdue (1902–1989), American silent-film actress and dancer
- Frank Perdue (1920–2005), American businessman
- Hub Perdue (1882–1968), baseball player
- Jim Perdue, American businessman
- John Perdue, American politician from West Virginia
- Lauren Perdue (born 1991), American swimmer
- Lewis Perdue, American novelist
- Peter C. Perdue (born 1949), American author, professor, and historian
- Richard Perdue (1910–1998), Anglican bishop
- Sally Perdue, Miss Arkansas 1958 and radio talk show host
- Sonny Perdue (born 1946), American politician from Georgia
- Tito Perdue (born 1938), American writer
- Will Perdue (born 1965), American basketball player

== See also ==
- Purdue (disambiguation) § People, includes people with the surname Purdue
