= Business magnate =

Entrepreneur achieving wealth and prominence in particular industries

A business magnate, also known as an industrialist or tycoon, is a person who is a powerful entrepreneur and investor who controls, through personal enterprise ownership or a dominant shareholding position, a firm or industry whose goods or services are widely consumed.

== Etymology and history ==
The term magnate derives from the Latin word magnates (plural of magnas), meaning "great man" or "great nobleman".

The term mogul is an English corruption of mughal, Persian or Arabic for "Mongol". It alludes to emperors of the Mughal Empire in Early Modern India, who possessed great power and storied riches capable of producing wonders of opulence, such as the Taj Mahal.

The term tycoon derives from the Japanese word taikun (大君), which means "great lord", used as a title for the shōgun. The word entered the English language in 1857 with the return of Commodore Perry to the United States. U.S. President Abraham Lincoln was humorously referred to as "the Tycoon" by his aides John Nicolay and John Hay. The term spread to the business community, where it has been used ever since.

== Usage ==
Modern business magnates are entrepreneurs that amass on their own or wield substantial family fortunes in the process of building or running their own businesses. Some are widely known in connection with these entrepreneurial activities, others through highly visible secondary pursuits such as philanthropy, political fundraising and campaign financing, and sports team ownership or sponsorship.

The terms mogul, tycoon, and baron were often applied to late-19th- and early-20th-century North American business magnates in extractive industries such as mining, logging and petroleum, transportation fields such as shipping and railroads, manufacturing such as automaking and steelmaking, in banking, as well as newspaper publishing. Their dominance was known as the Second Industrial Revolution, the Gilded Age, or the Robber Baron Era.

Examples of business magnates in the western world include historical figures such as pottery entrepreneur Josiah Wedgwood, oilmen John D. Rockefeller and Fred C. Koch, automobile pioneer Henry Ford, aviation pioneer Howard Hughes, shipping and railroad veterans Aristotle Onassis, Cornelius Vanderbilt, Leland Stanford, Jay Gould and James J. Hill, steel innovator Andrew Carnegie, newspaper publisher William Randolph Hearst, poultry entrepreneur Arthur Perdue, retail merchant Sam Walton, and bankers J. P. Morgan and Mayer Amschel Rothschild. Contemporary industrial tycoons include e-commerce entrepreneur Jeff Bezos, investor Warren Buffett, computer programmers Bill Gates and Paul Allen, technology innovator Steve Jobs, vacuum cleaner retailer Sir James Dyson, media proprietors Sumner Redstone, Ted Turner and Rupert Murdoch, industrial entrepreneur Elon Musk, steel investor Lakshmi Mittal, telecommunications investor Carlos Slim, Virgin Group founder Sir Richard Branson, Formula 1 executive Bernie Ecclestone, and internet entrepreneurs Larry Page and Sergey Brin.

== Business magnates ==
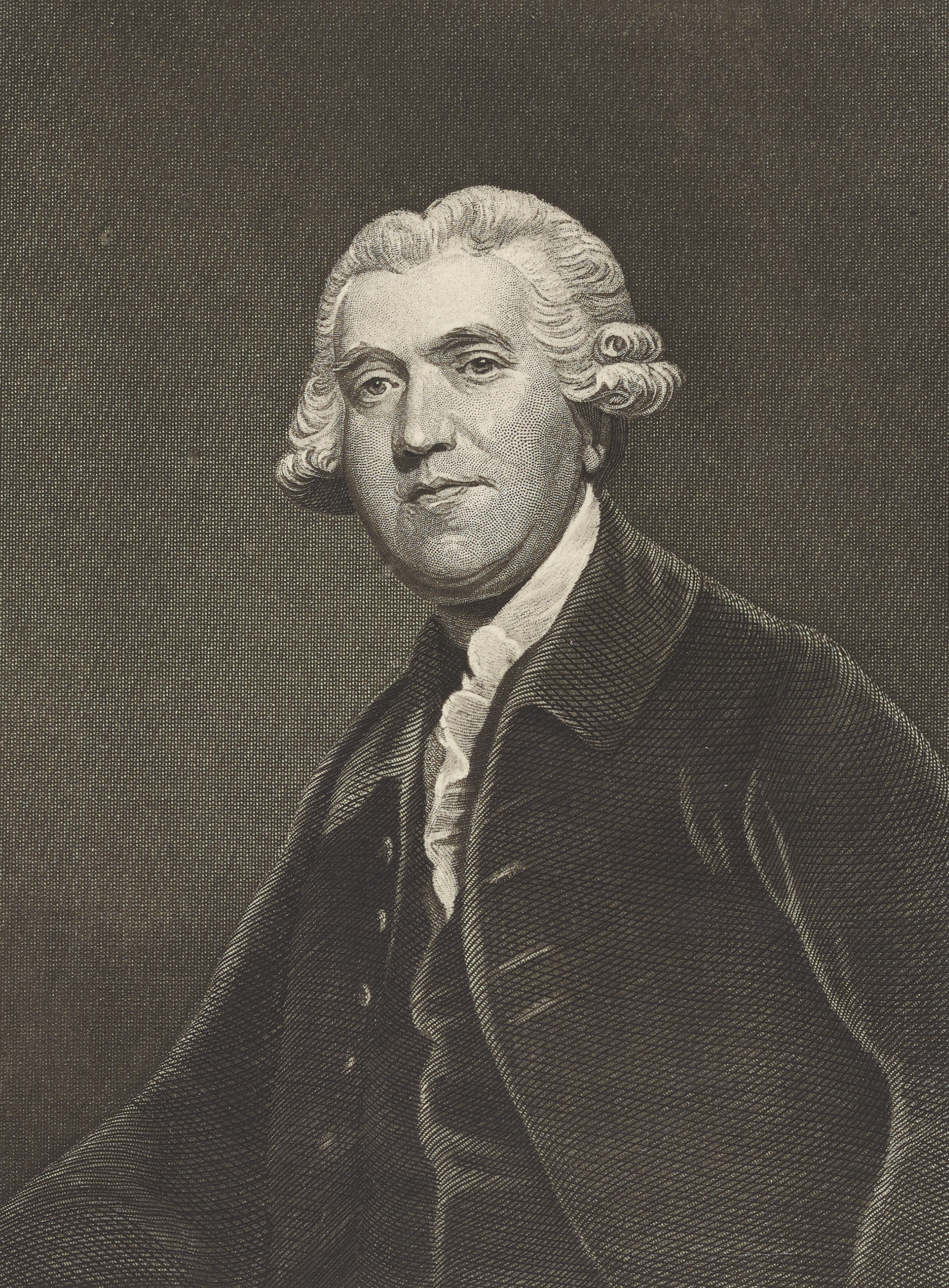
Josiah Wedgwood

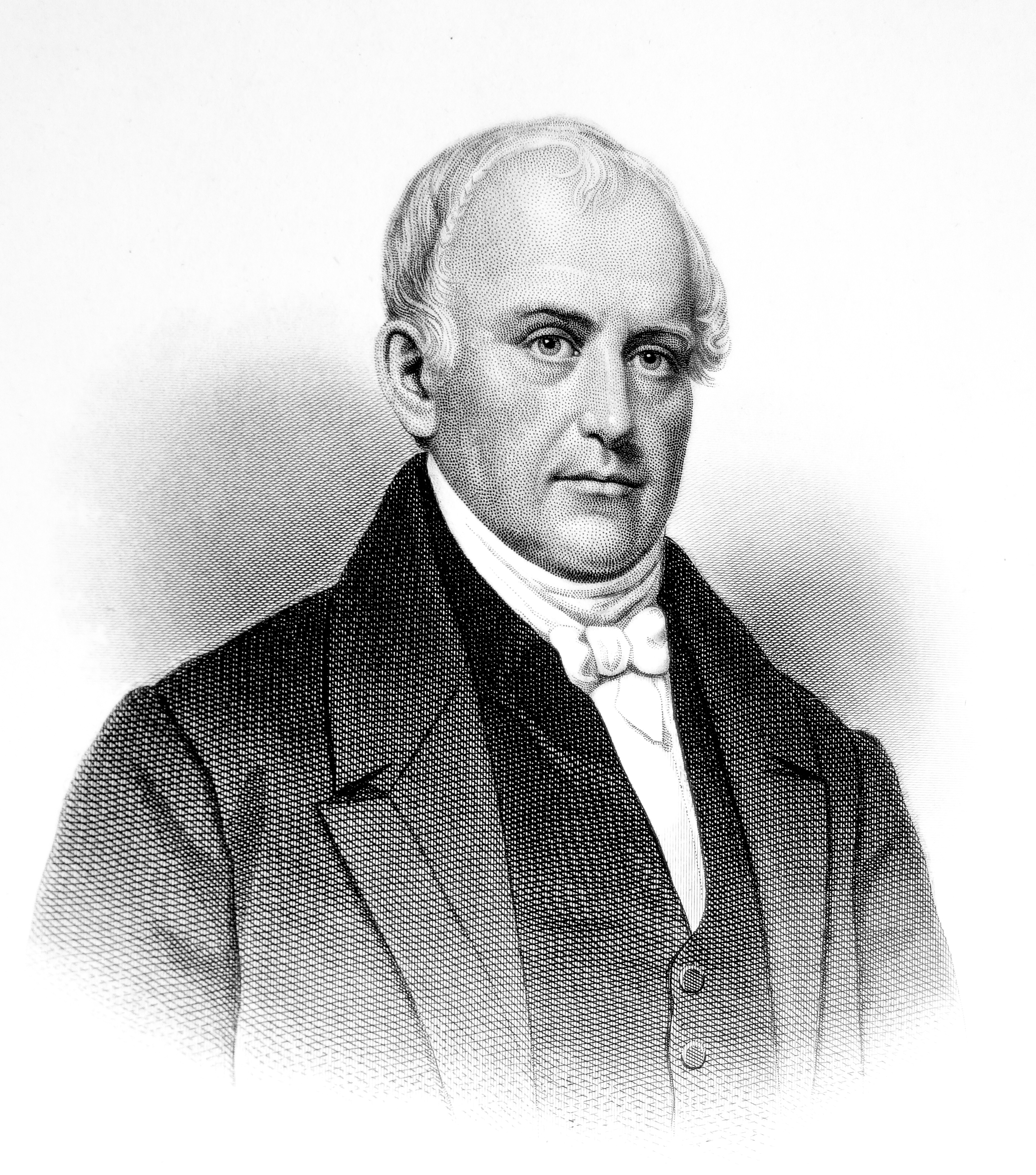
Samuel Slater

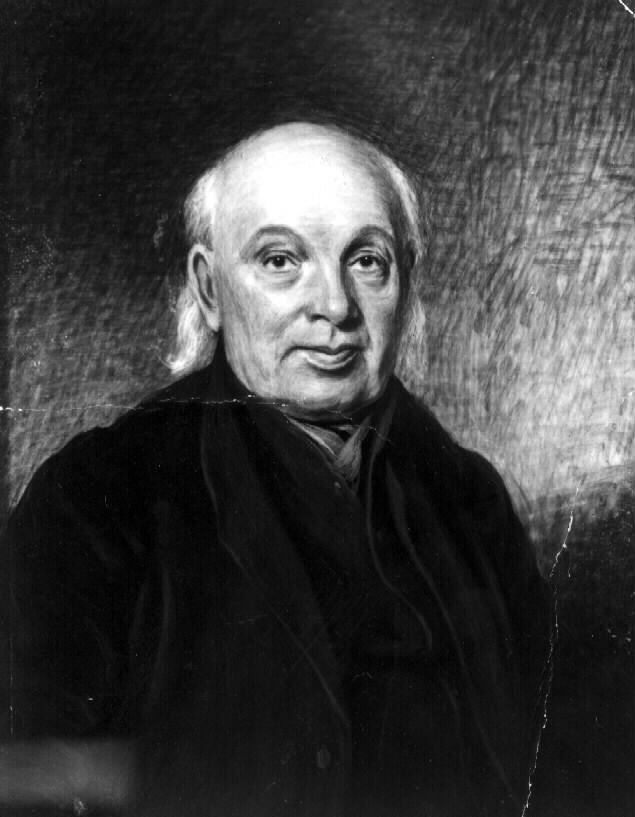
James Finlayson

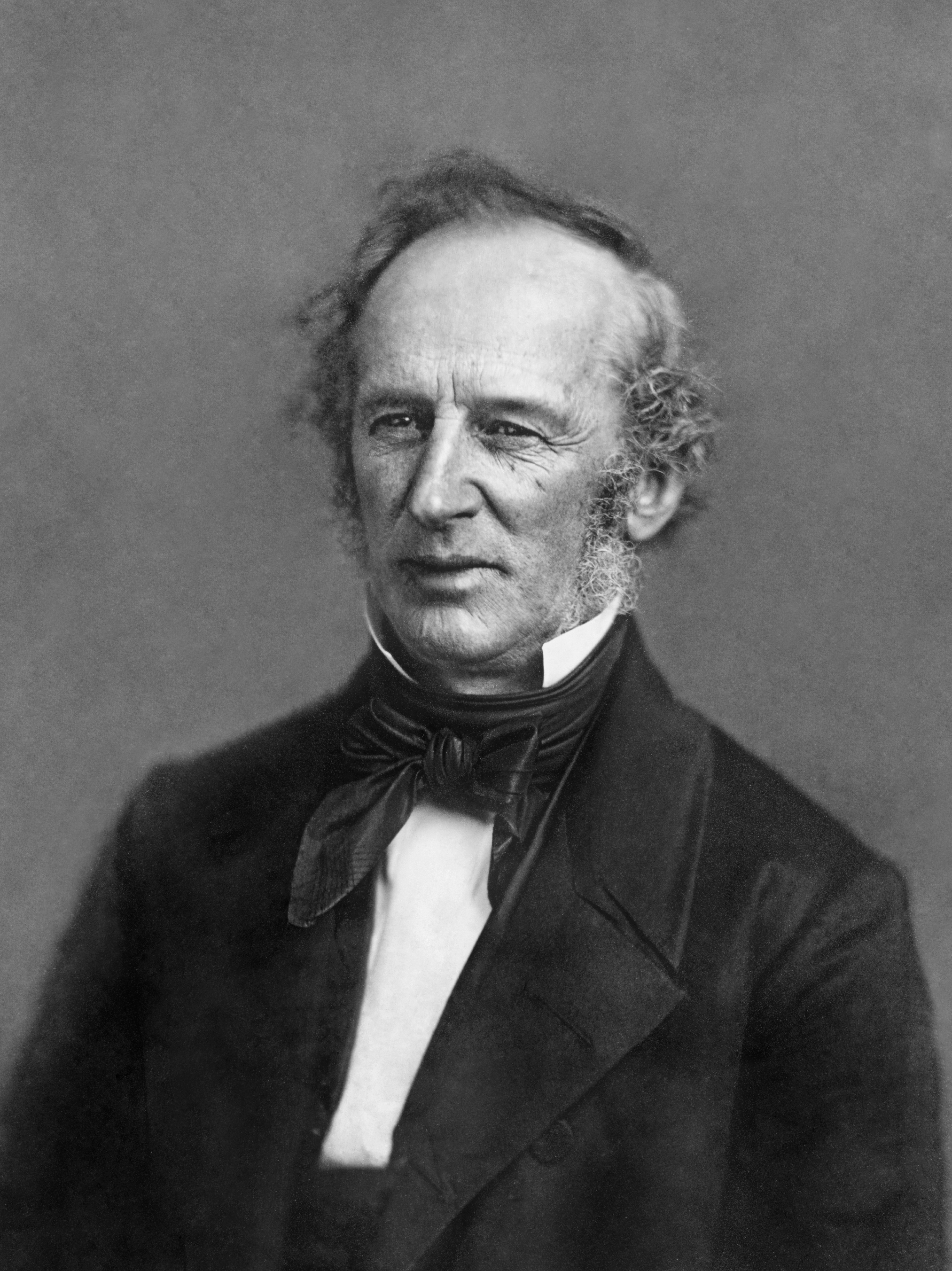
Cornelius Vanderbilt

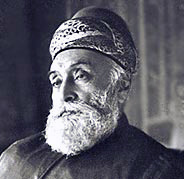
Jamsetji Tata

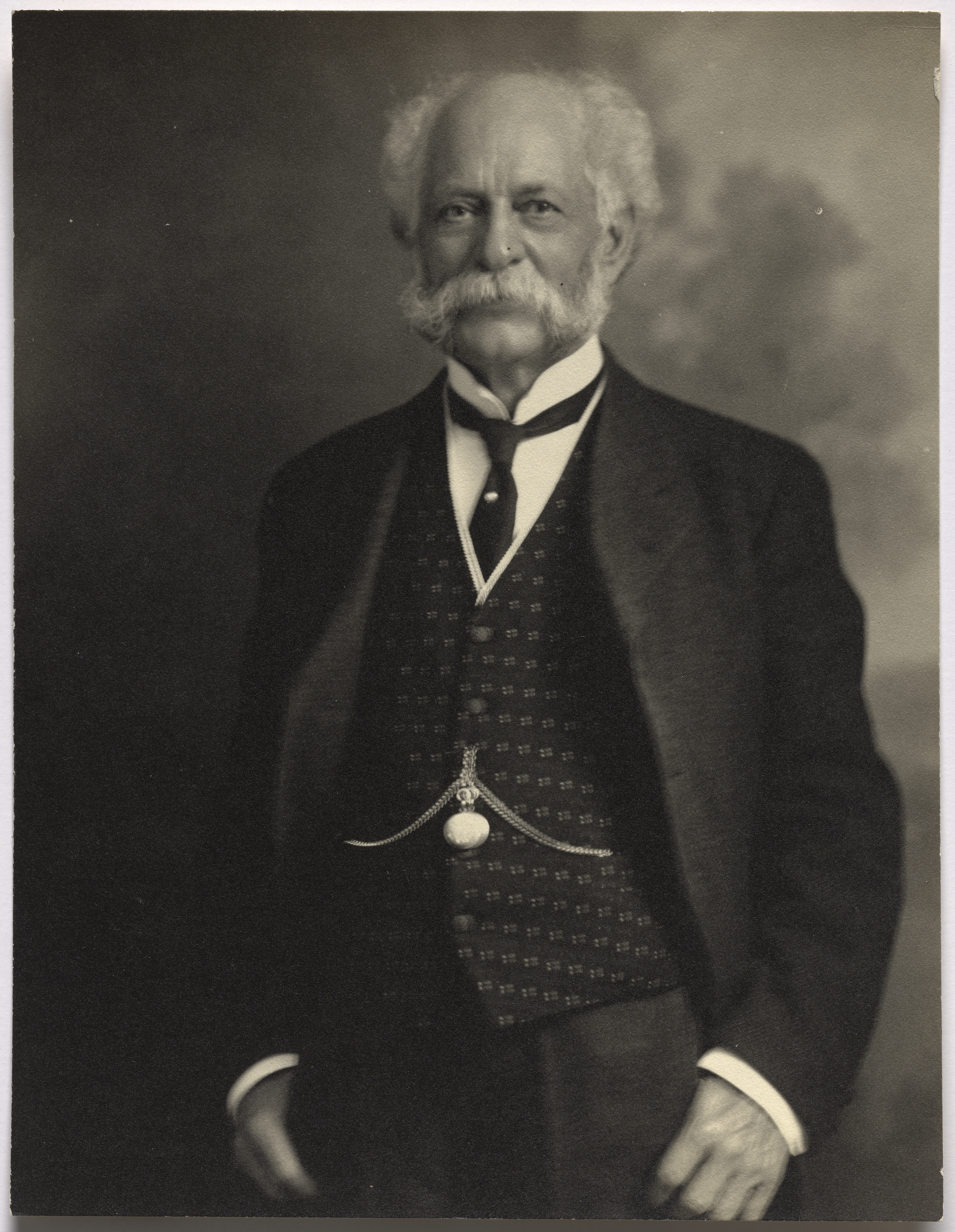
Henry J. Heinz

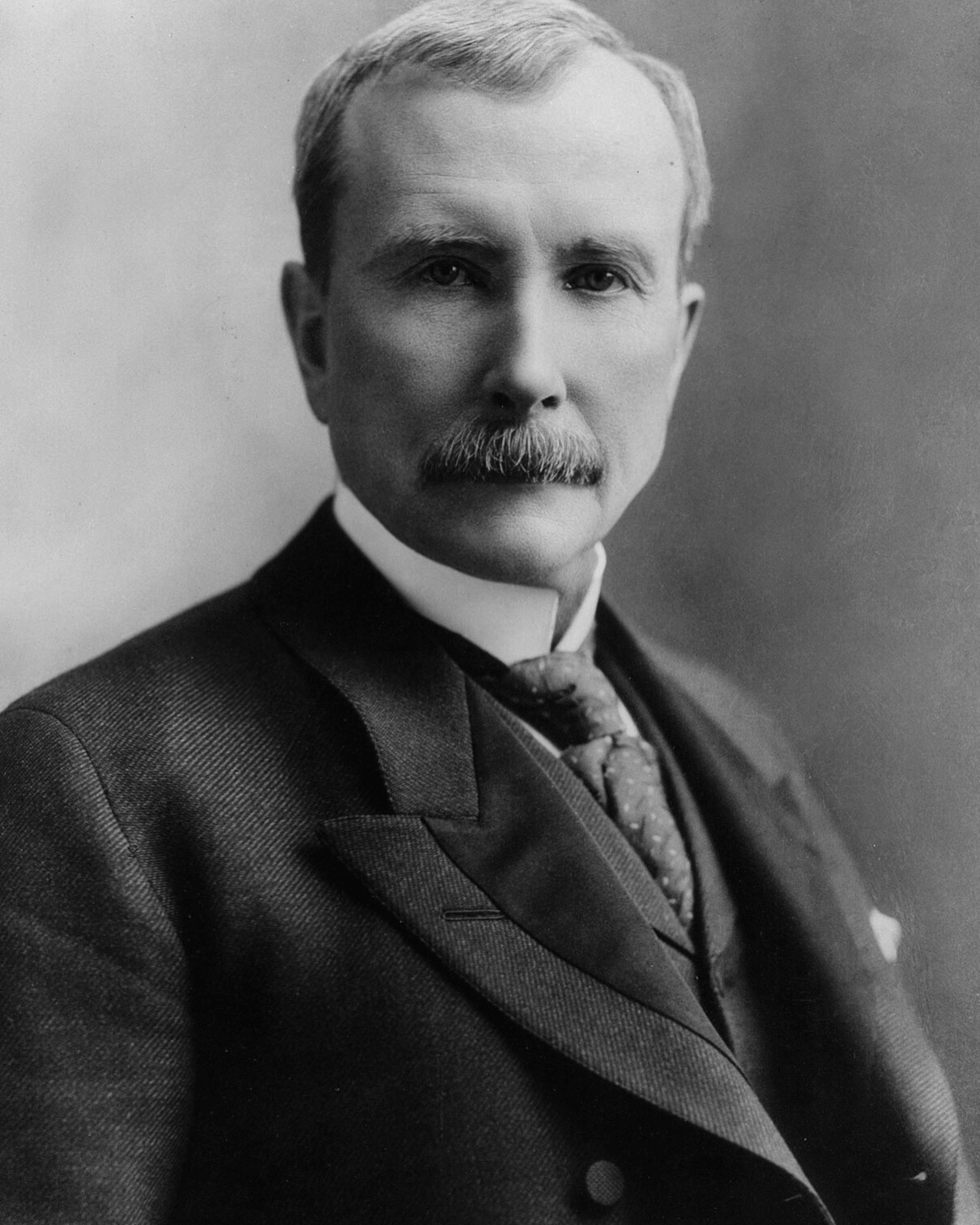
John D. Rockefeller

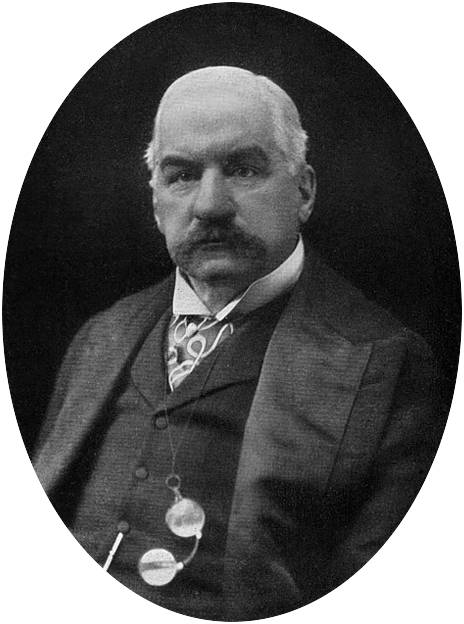
J. P. Morgan

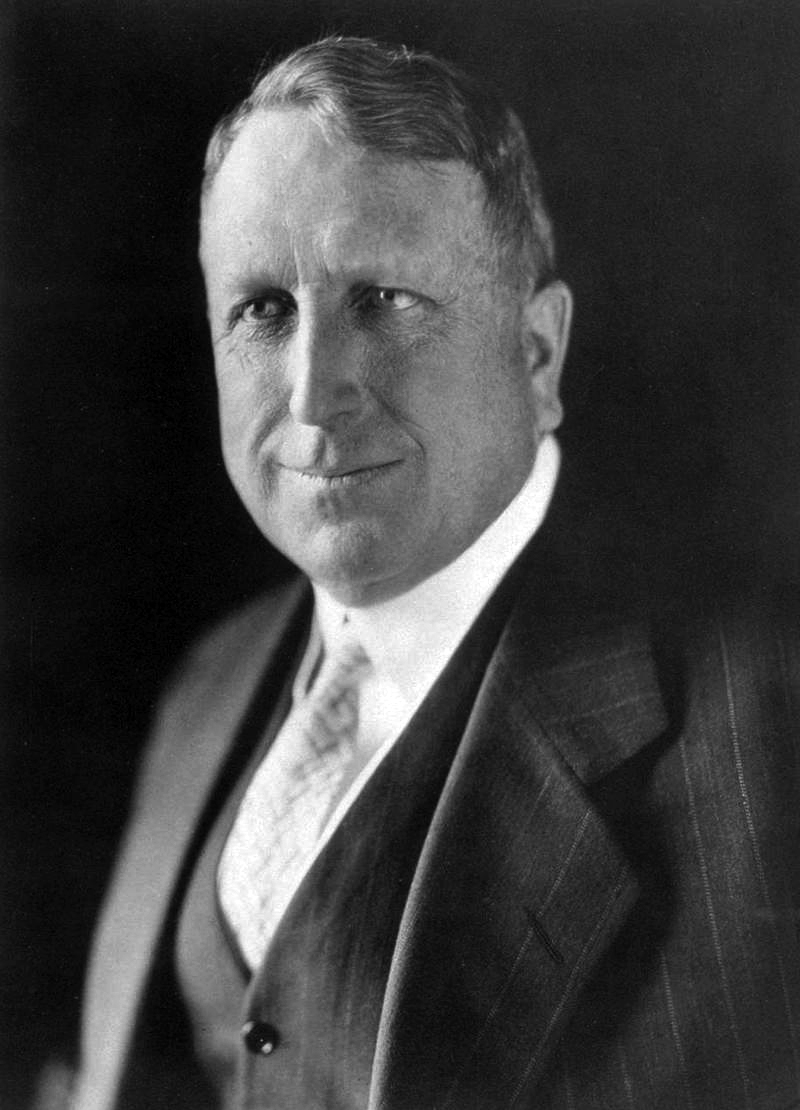
William Randolph Hearst

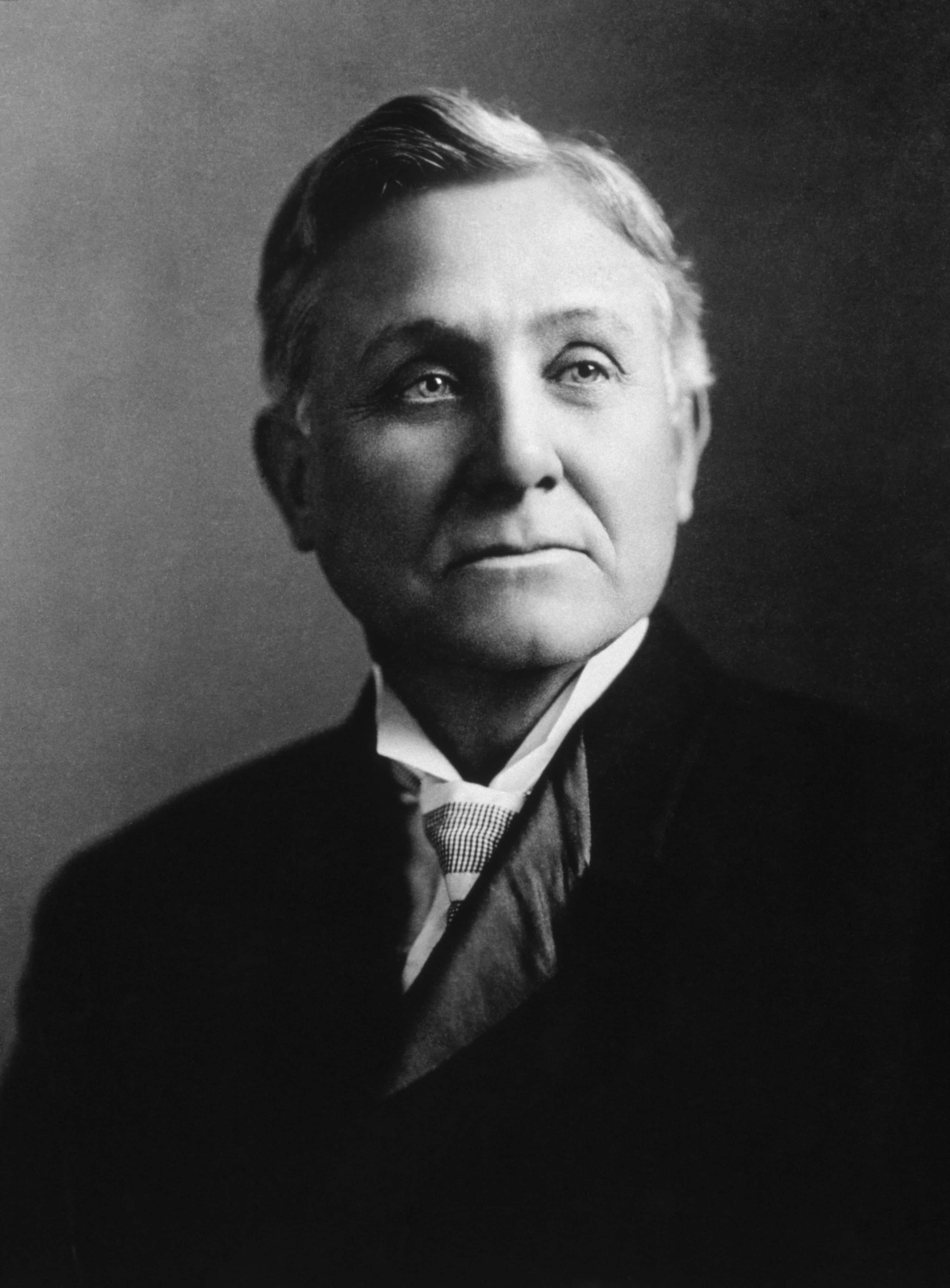
Asa Griggs Candler

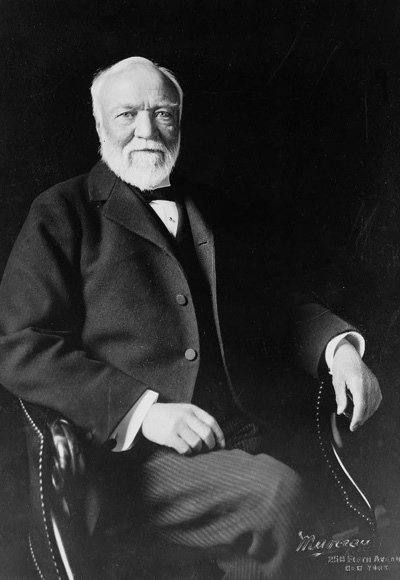
Andrew Carnegie

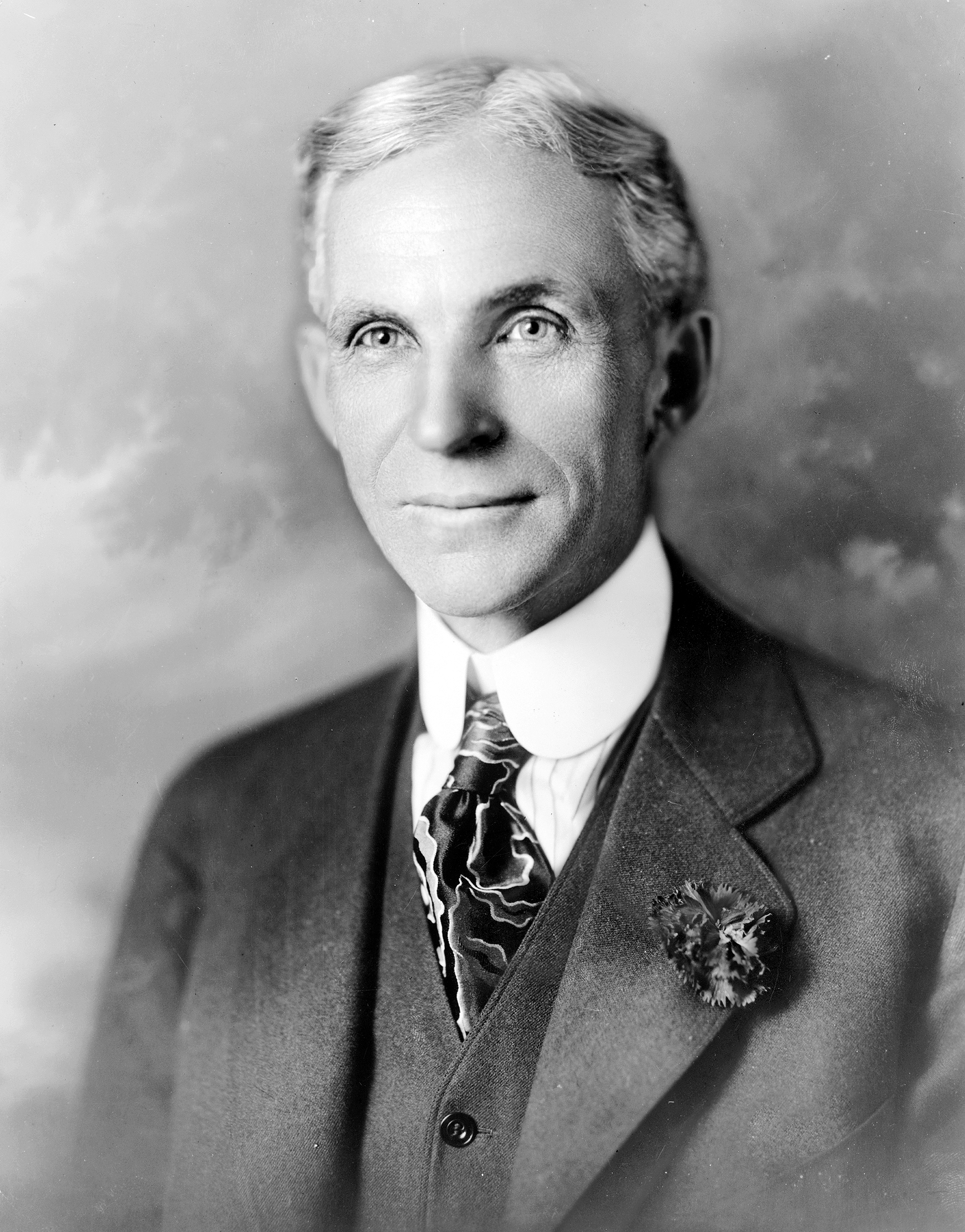
Henry Ford

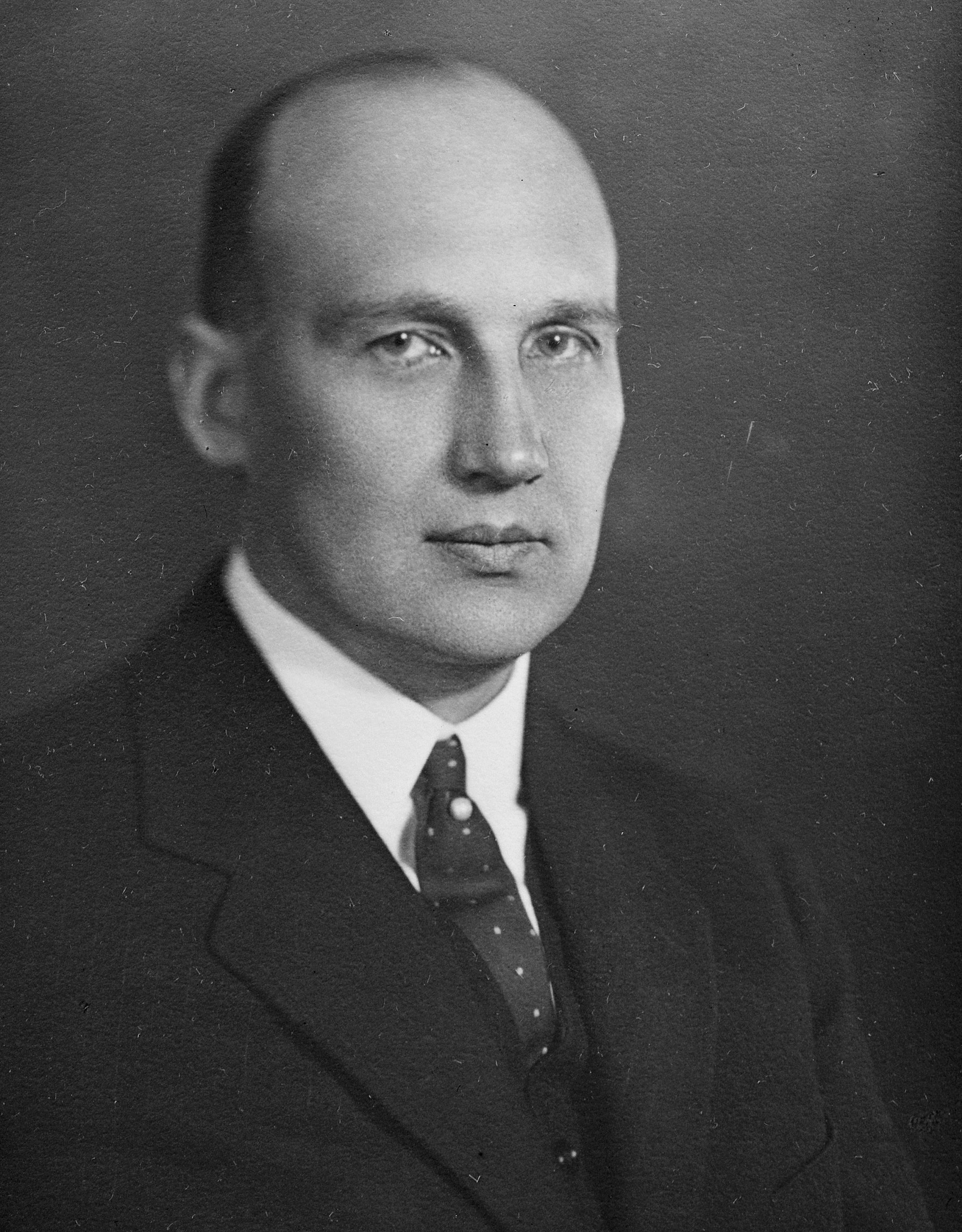
Ivar Kreuger

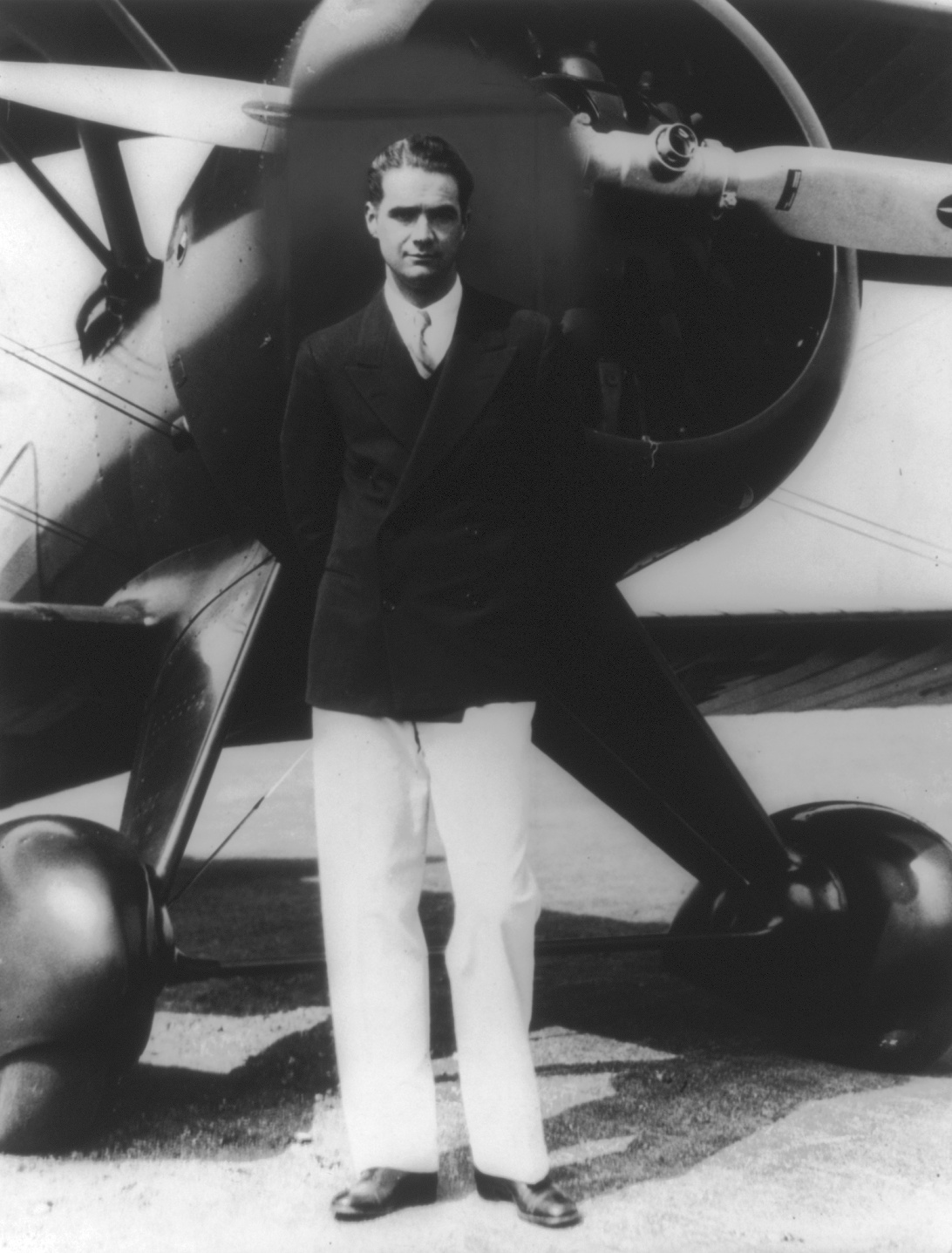
Howard Hughes

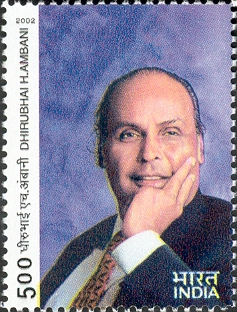
Dhirubhai Ambani

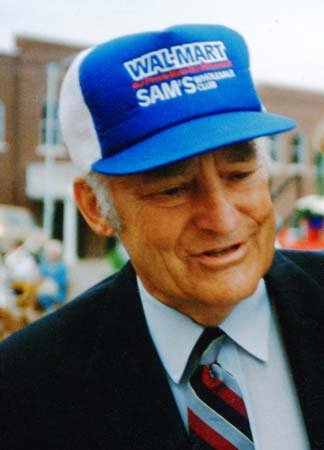
Sam Walton

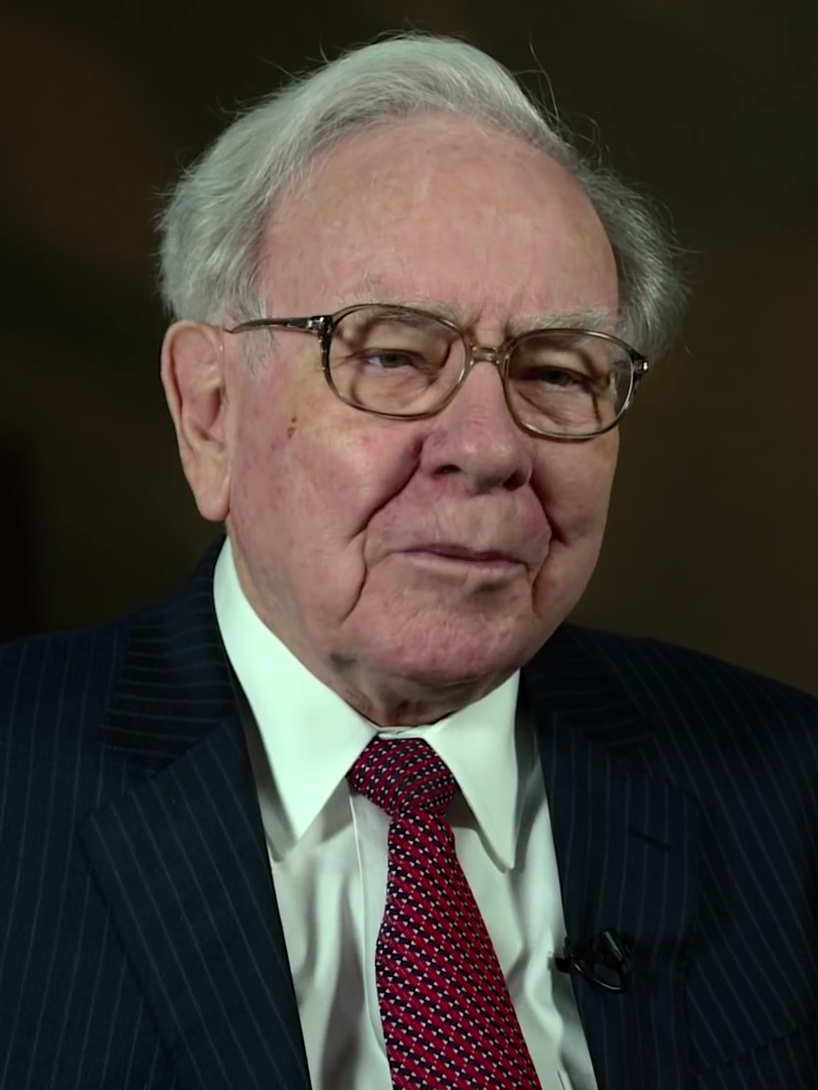
Warren Buffett

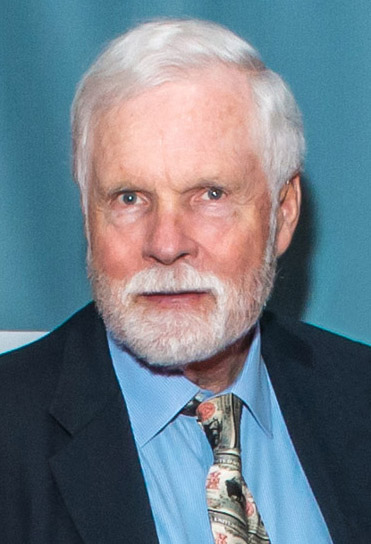
Ted Turner

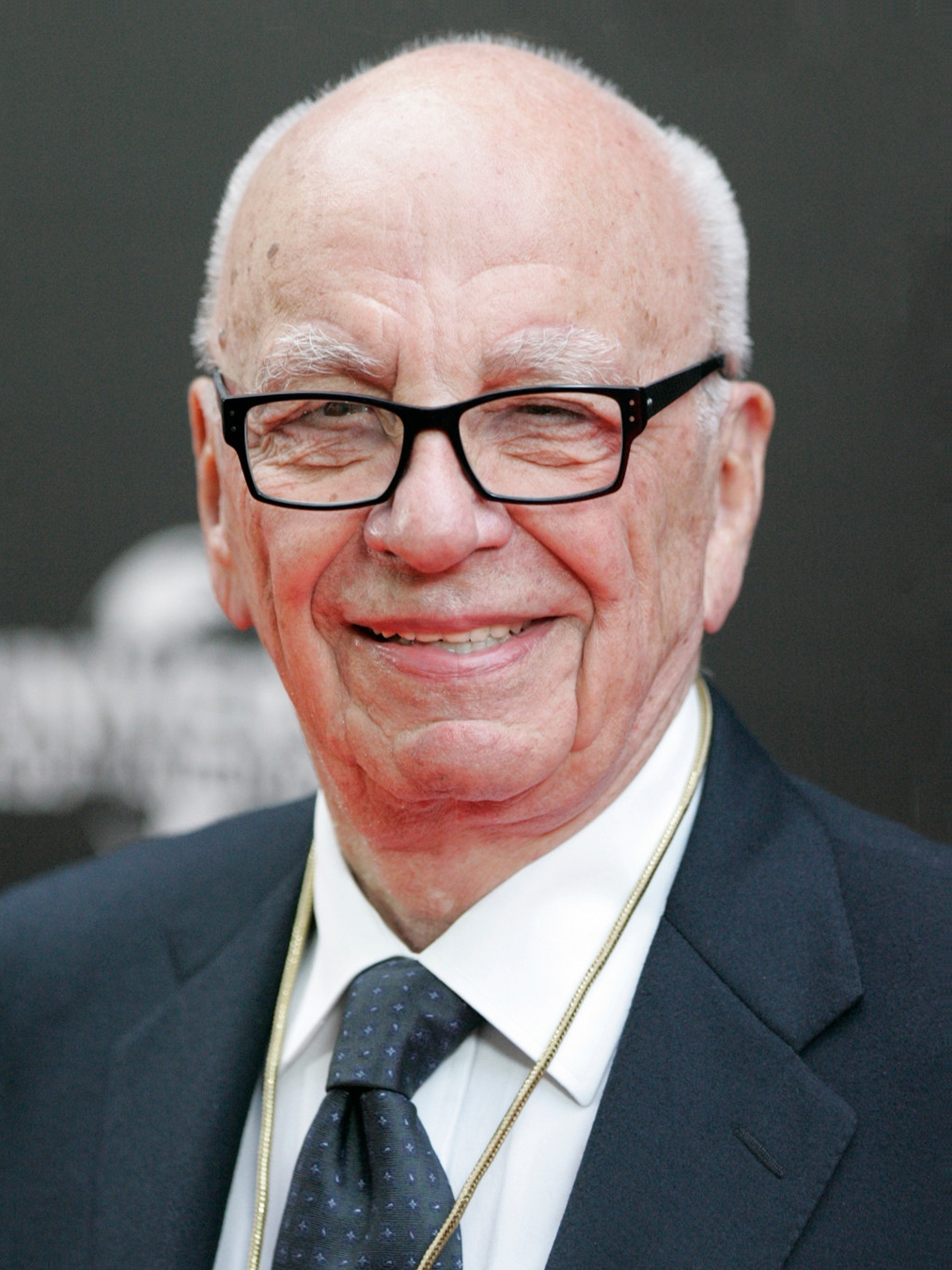
Rupert Murdoch

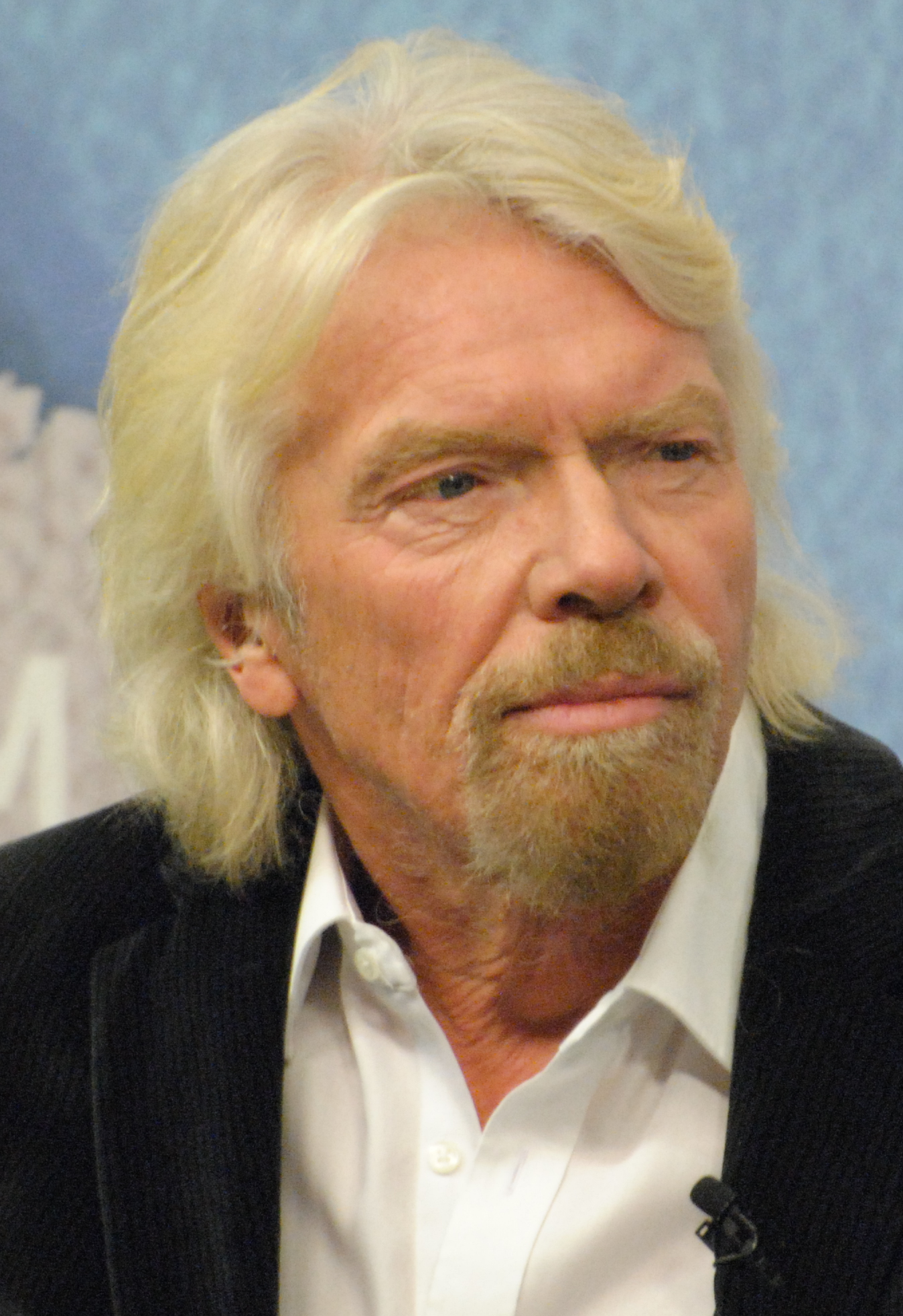
Richard Branson

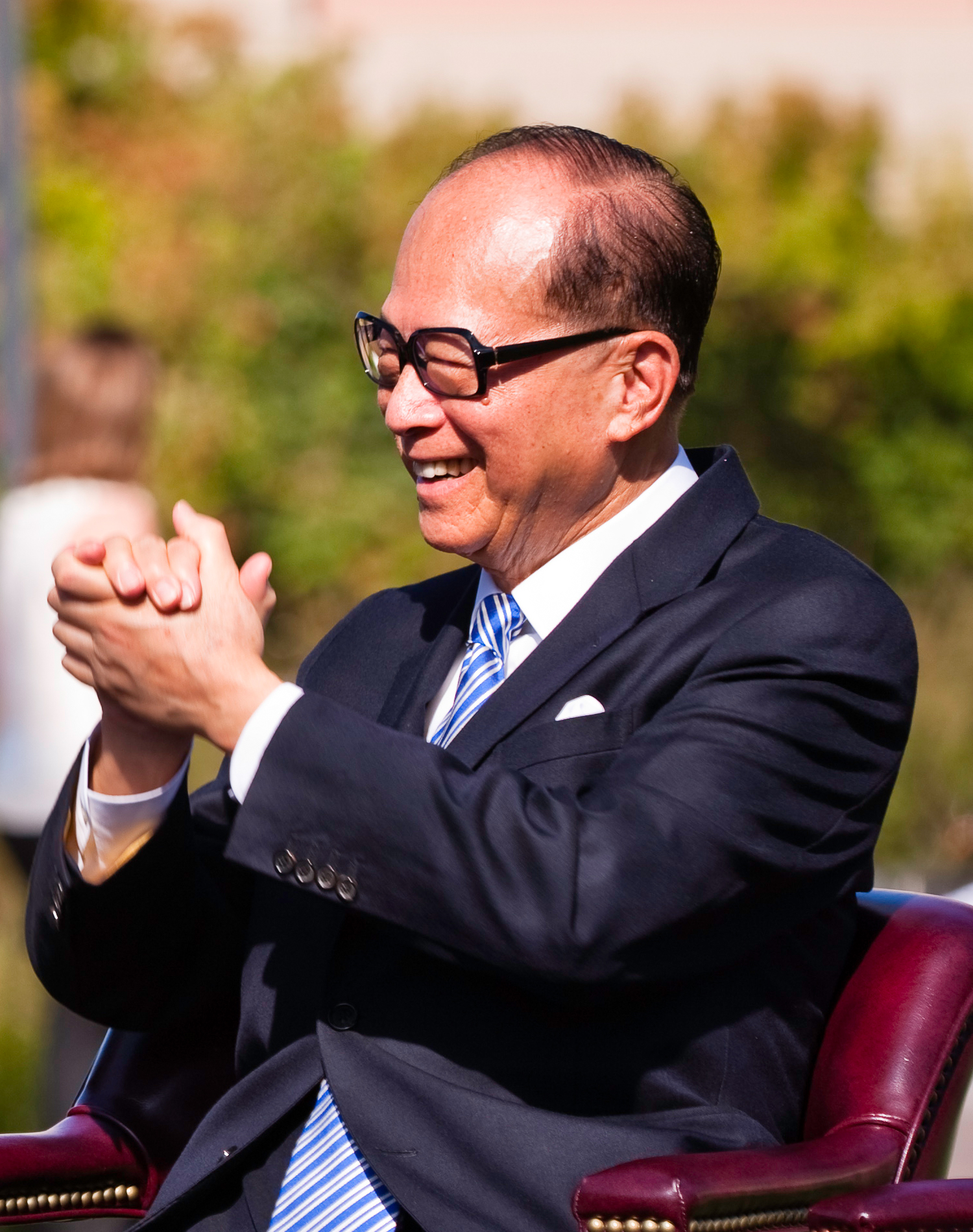
Li Ka-shing

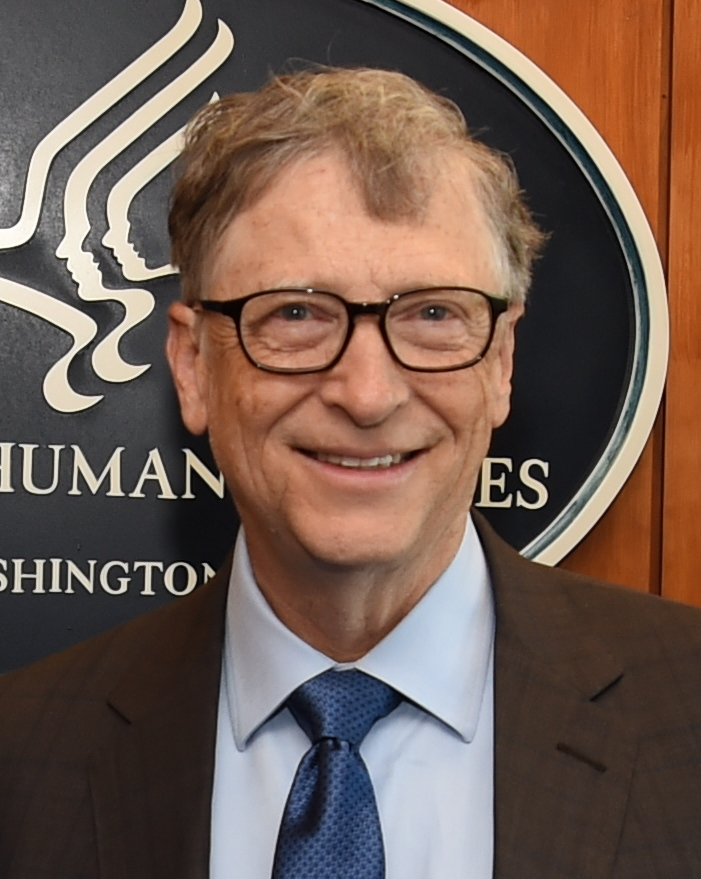
Bill Gates

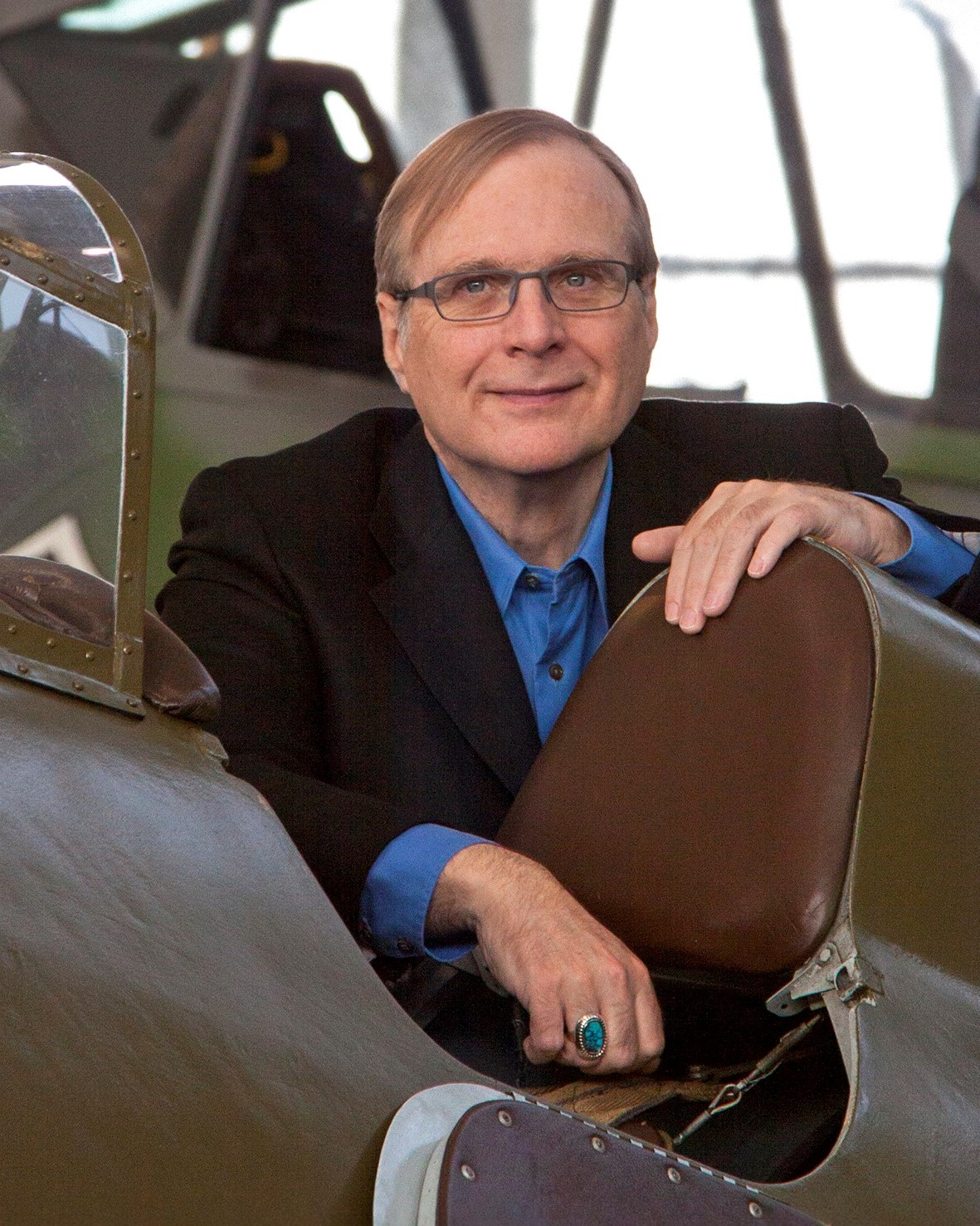
Paul Allen

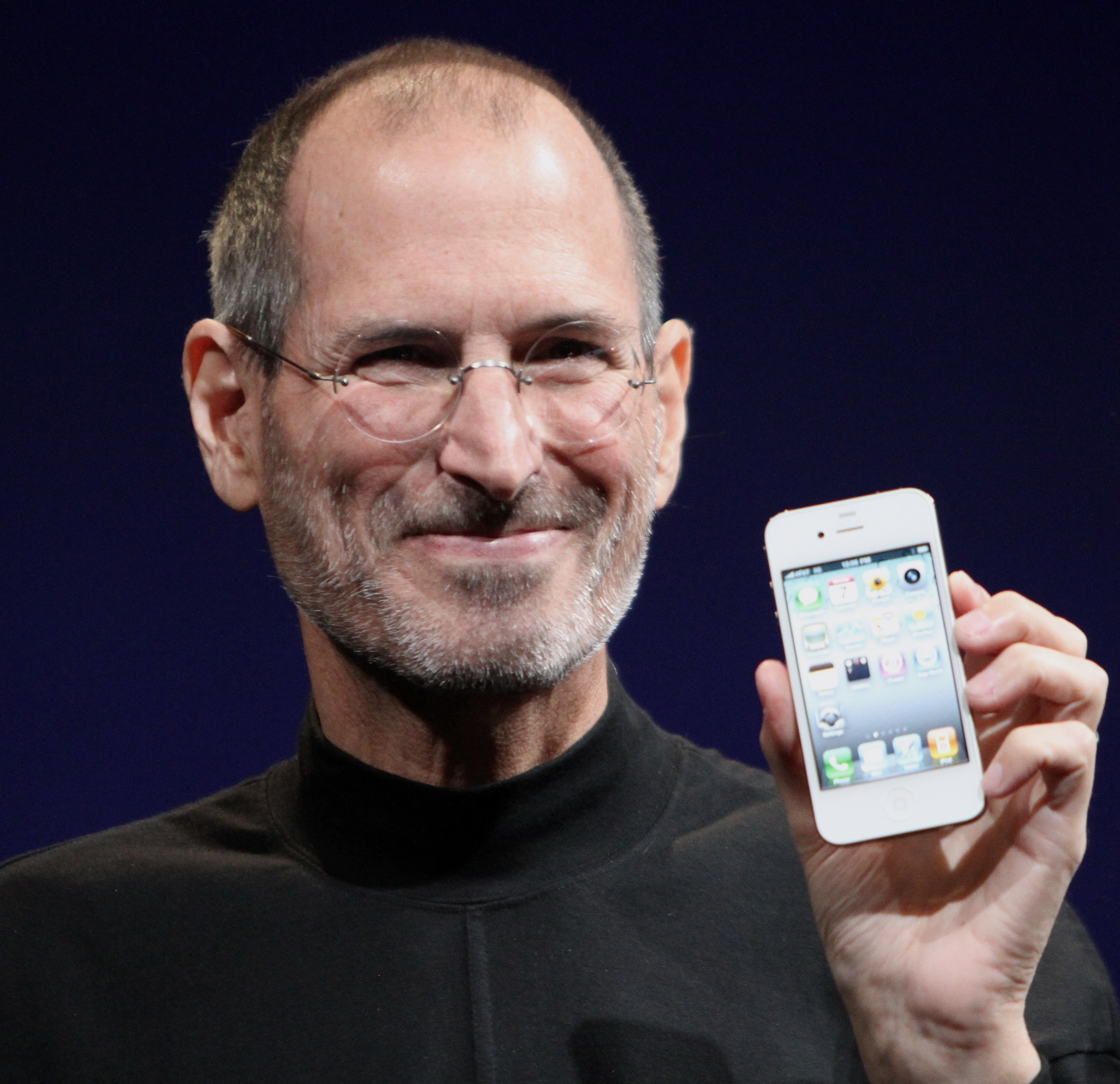
Steve Jobs

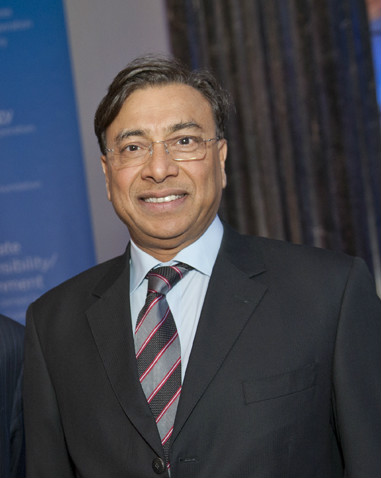
Lakshmi Mittal

Larry Ellison

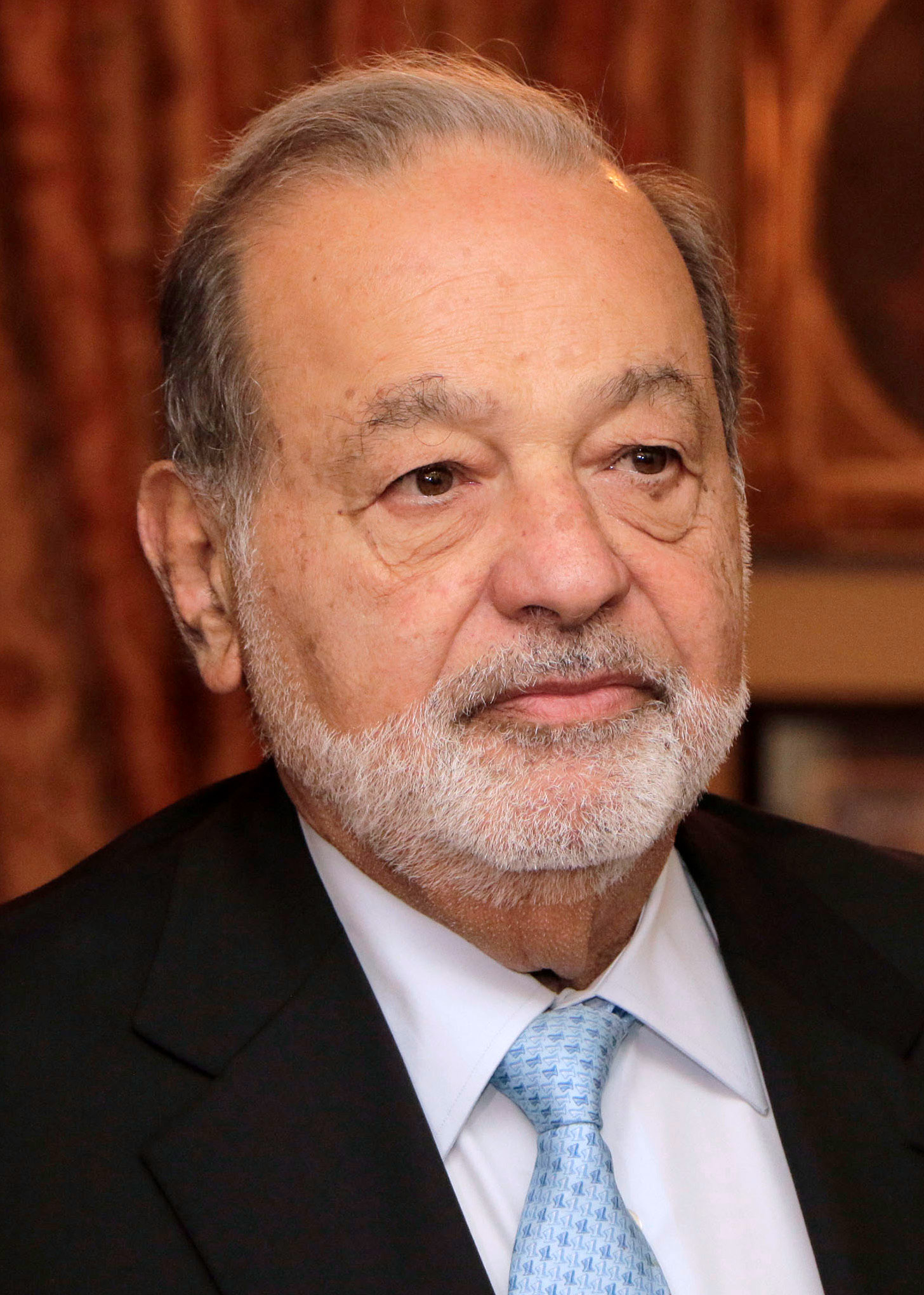
Carlos Slim

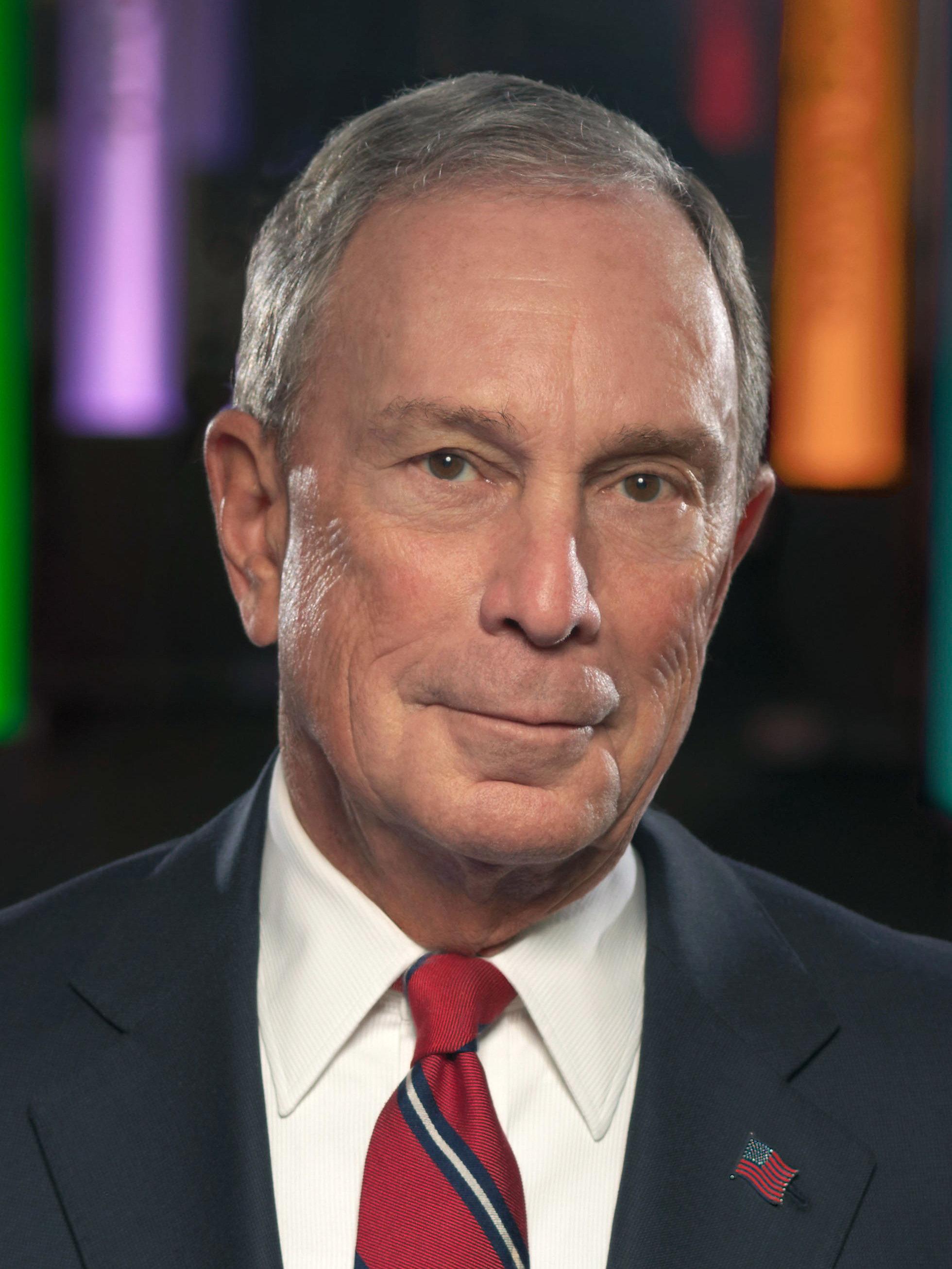
Michael Bloomberg

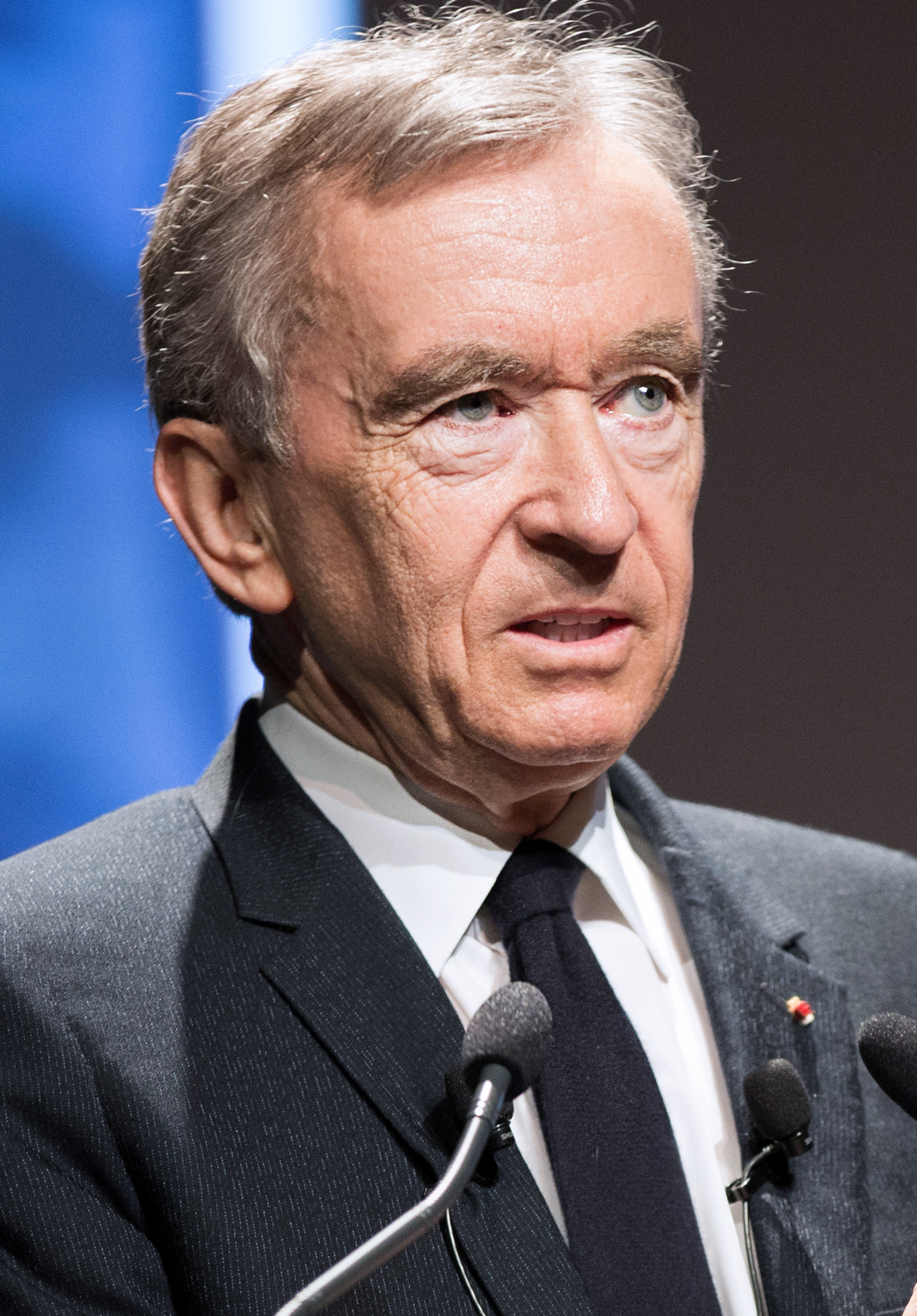
Bernard Arnault

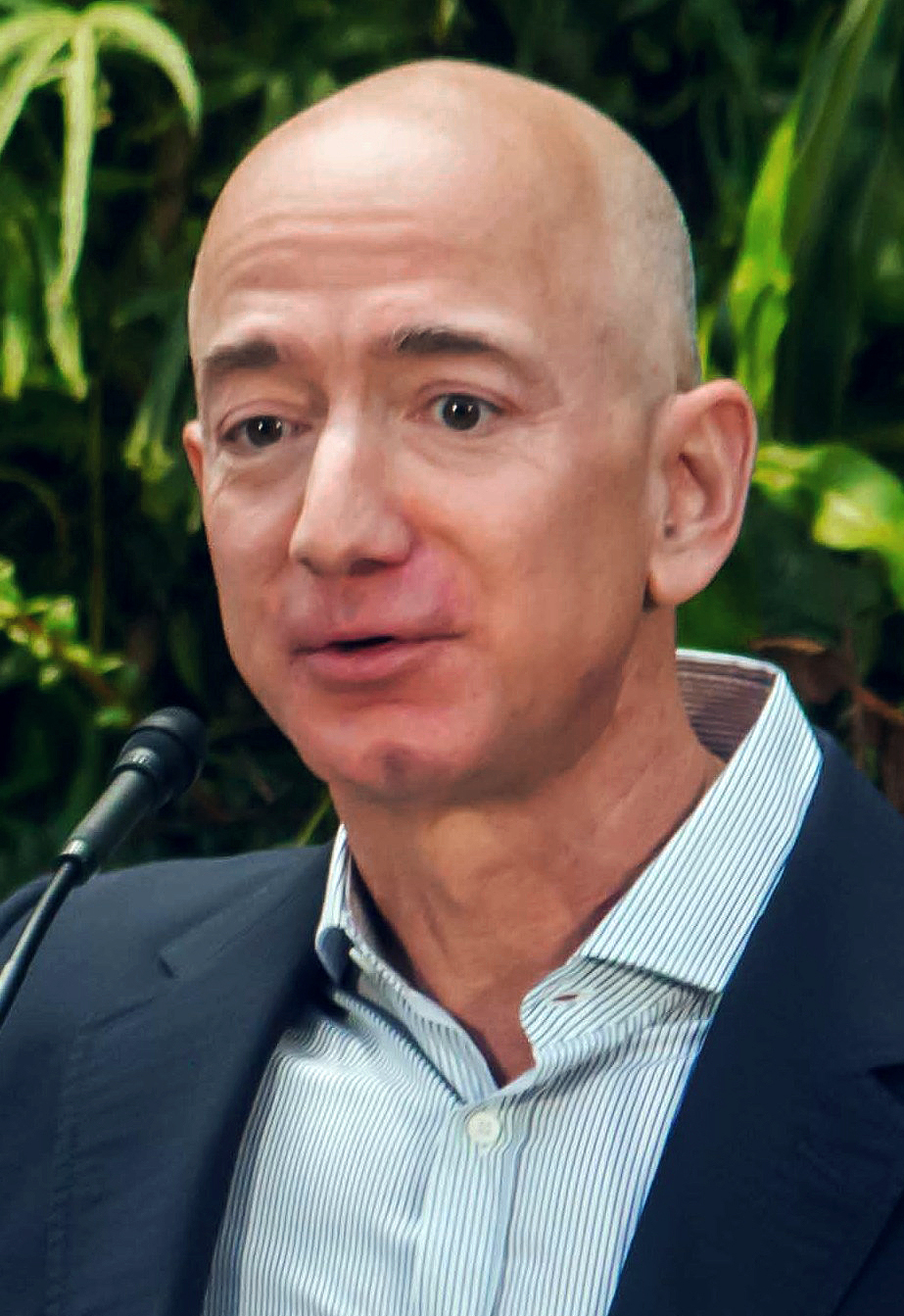
Jeff Bezos

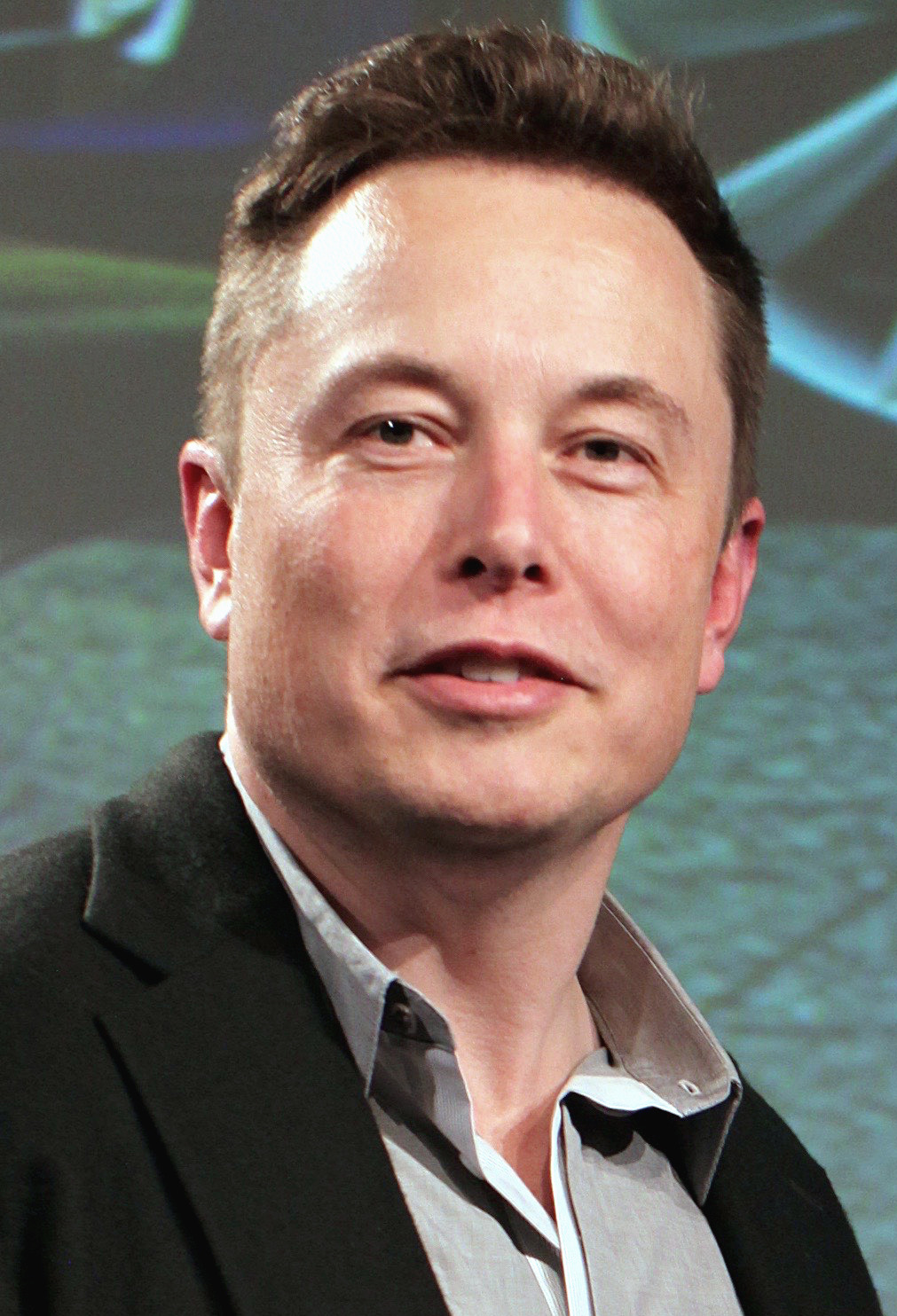
Elon Musk

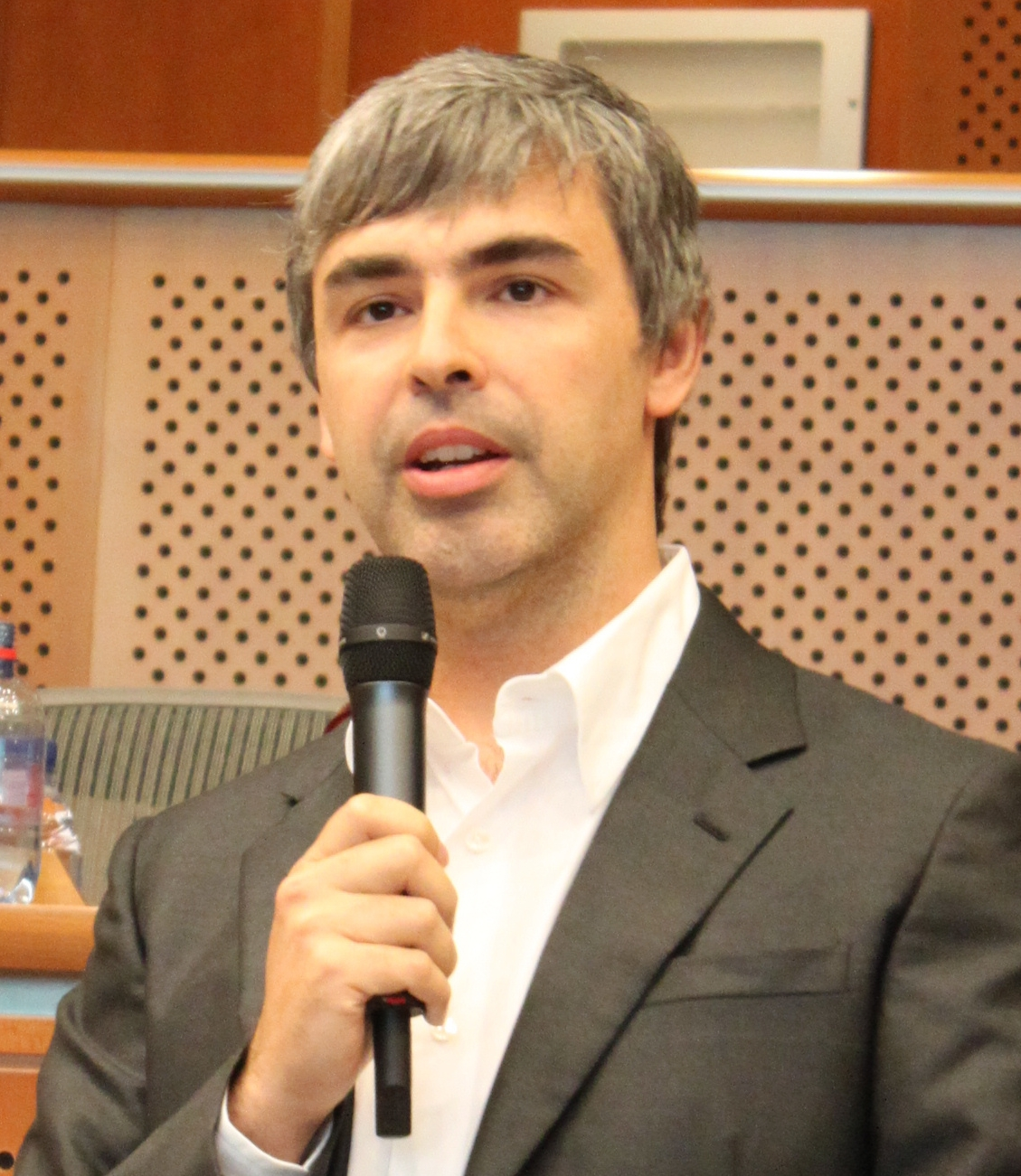
Larry Page

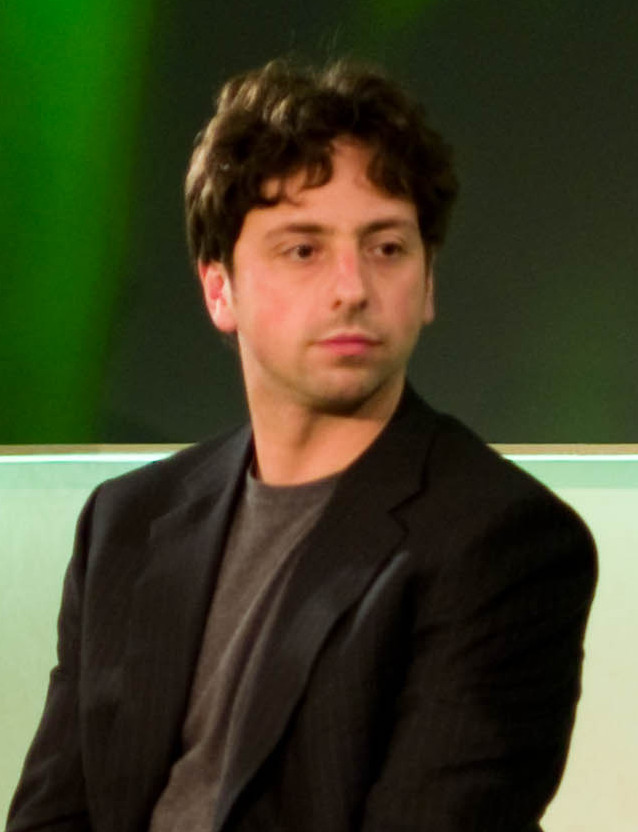
Sergey Brin

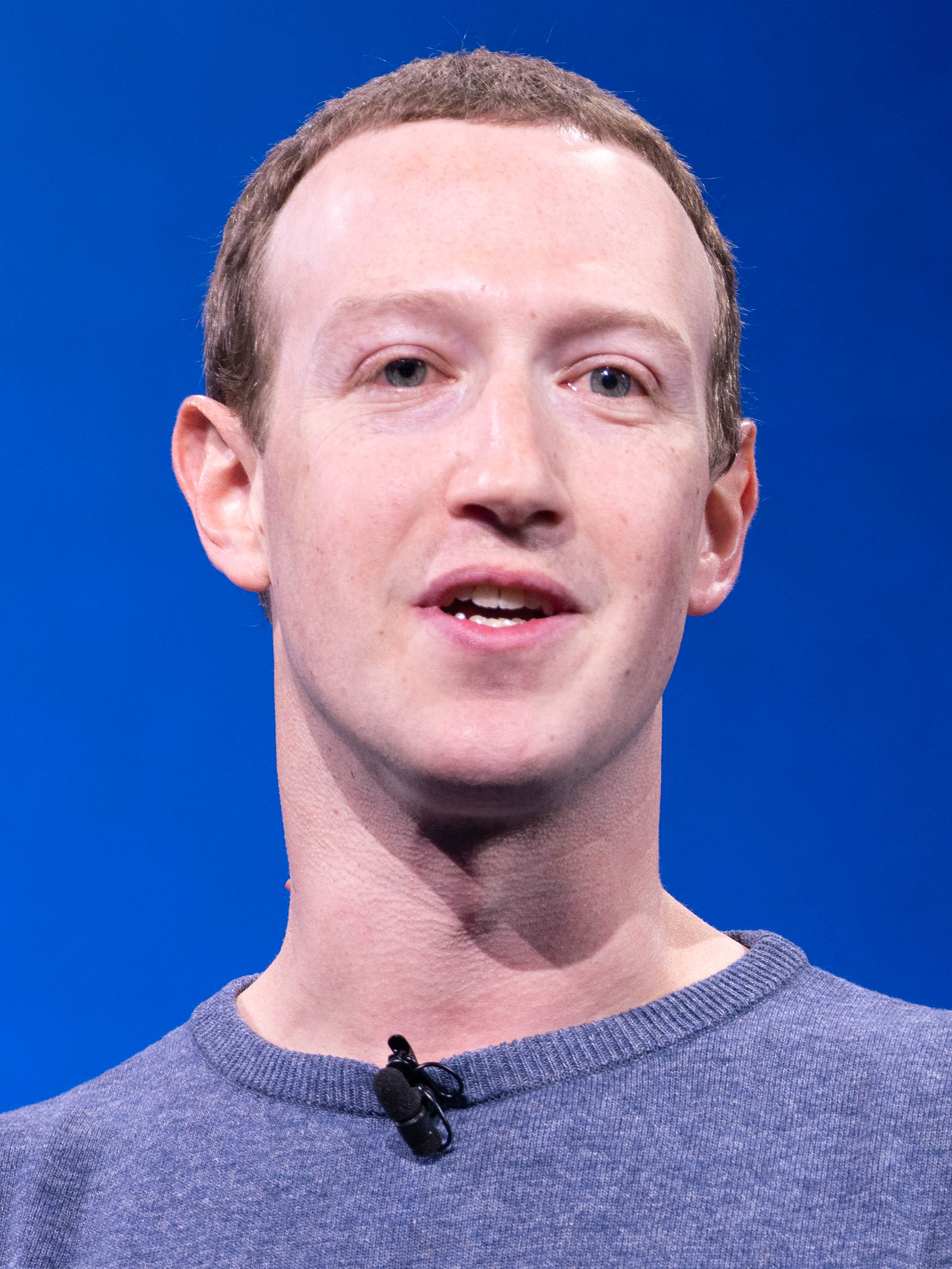
Mark Zuckerberg

== See also ==
- Bloomberg Billionaires Index
- Bourgeoisie
- Business oligarch
- Businessperson
- Chaebol
- Media proprietor
- Real estate investing
- Robber baron
- Software industry
- The World's Billionaires
- Russian oligarchs, the term for Russian business magnates
