= Governor Perdue =

Governor Perdue may refer to:

- Bev Perdue (born 1947), governor of North Carolina (2009-2013)
- Sonny Perdue (born 1946), governor of Georgia (2003-2011)

== See also ==
- Perdue (surname)
