= Frank Perdue =

American businessman (1920-2005)

- Born: Franklin Parsons Perdue; May 9, 1920; Salisbury, Maryland, U.S.
- Died: March 31, 2005 (aged 84); Salisbury, Maryland, U.S.
- Other name: Frank
- Occupations: President and CEO of Perdue Farms
- Spouse: Mitzi Henderson (m. 1988)

Franklin Parsons Perdue (May 9, 1920 – March 31, 2005), born in Salisbury, Maryland, was for many years the president and CEO of Perdue Farms, now one of the largest chicken-producing companies in the United States.

== Early life ==
Frank was the only child of Arthur Perdue and Pearl Perdue (nee Parsons).

== Career ==
Perdue Farms was founded in 1920 by Arthur Perdue with his wife, Pearl Perdue who had been keeping a small flock of chickens. Their son, Frank, joined the company in 1939 at age 19 after dropping out of college at Salisbury University.

Frank Perdue's promotion of the Perdue brand through high-profile advertising resulted in its being the first well-known brand of chicken in the U.S. Perdue Farms developed a specialized chicken-feed that included marigold blossoms, which imparted a characteristic golden yellow hue to the skins of his chickens.

In the 1980s, Perdue twice sought assistance from then-Mafia boss Paul Castellano to fend off a union's effort to represent workers at his company, according to a federal commission on labor corruption. He turned over leadership of Perdue Farms to his son, Jim Perdue, in 1991.

== Advertising ==
In 1971, Perdue Farm embarked on its first major advertising campaign and had contracted the firm of Scali, McCabe, Sloves. The firm came up with the idea of putting Perdue on television himself, with the tag line, "It takes a tough man to make a tender chicken." This was fairly radical because at the time, CEOs were not usually public spokespeople for their firms. The first commercial, shot in the city park in Salisbury, was ranked by Advertising Age as one of the best campaigns of the year. It was so successful that he went on to appear in over 200 of Perdue Farms' television commercials, although he was known for his shyness. Many of the commercials were known for Perdue encouraging people to voice any complaints or dissatisfaction with Perdue products, usually ending with Perdue stating "Say whatever you have to say; I can take it".

Through this advertising, Perdue is credited with creating the first recognized brand for chicken.

== Death ==
According to Perdue company officials, Perdue died on March 31, 2005, after a brief illness. He was 84.

== Legacy ==
In 1983, Perdue received the Golden Plate Award of the American Academy of Achievement.

The Franklin P. Perdue School of Business was established at Salisbury University in 1986 and named for Frank Perdue.

In 1991, Frank Perdue was honored with an Edison Achievement Award for his commitment to innovation throughout his career.

Frank Perdue was a patron of treasure hunter Mel Fisher, helping fund his expedition to locate the wreckage of the Spanish galleon Nuestra Señora de Atocha, which had sunk off the coast of the Florida Keys in 1622. Fisher eventually found the galleon and in 1985 and recovered more than $400 million in gold and gems. Perdue donated much of his portion of the recovered gems and coins to the Smithsonian Institution and to Delaware Technical Community College.
