= Salisbury University =

Public university in Salisbury, Maryland, U.S.

Coordinates: 38°20′44″N 75°36′21″W

- Former names: Maryland State Normal School (1925–1934); Maryland State Teachers College (1934–1963); Salisbury State College (1963–1988); Salisbury State University (1988–2001)
- Motto: "Make Tomorrow Yours"
- Type: Public university
- Established: September 25, 1925
- Parent institution: University System of Maryland
- Endowment: $82.15 million (2024)
- President: Carolyn Ringer Lepre
- Provost: Laurie Couch
- Faculty: 425 (full-time)
- Undergraduates: 6,056
- Postgraduates: 707 (Fall 2024)
- Location: Salisbury, Maryland, U.S.
- Campus: 200 acres (81 ha); Suburban, 215 acres (0.87 km^{2})
- Colors: Maroon & gold
- Nickname: Sea Gulls
- Sporting affiliations: NCAA Division III – C2C
- Mascot: Sammy the Sea Gull
- Website: www.salisbury.edu

Salisbury University is a public university in Salisbury, Maryland, United States. Founded in 1925, Salisbury University is a member of the University System of Maryland.

Salisbury University offers undergraduate and graduate degree programs across six academic units: the Fulton School of Liberal Arts, Perdue School of Business, Henson School of Science and Technology, Seidel School of Education and Professional Studies, College of Health and Human Services, and Clarke Honors College.

The Salisbury Sea Gulls compete in Division III athletics as members of the Coast to Coast Athletic Conference, while the football team competes in the New Jersey Athletic Conference.

== History ==
Holloway Hall, named after the institution's first president, William J. Holloway

Salisbury University, originally called the Maryland State Normal School, opened on September 25, 1925 as a two-year institution to train elementary school teachers to help fill the teacher shortage in the state of Maryland. The original class of 105 students was greeted by Salisbury's first president, William J. Holloway, an experienced educator and the driving force behind the creation of the school.

The curriculum was influenced by those established at Columbia's Teachers College, alma mater of six of Salisbury Normal School's eight original faculty. During the Great Depression, Maryland extended the required course of study at normal schools from two years to three years, and to four years in 1934, paving the way for the institution to rebrand as a teachers' college one year later.

In 1934, the school's name was changed to Maryland State Teachers College, and in 1963 to Salisbury State College. Between 1962 and 1995, several master's degree programs were approved, and in 1988, the name was changed to Salisbury State University. In 2001, the name was changed to Salisbury University.

Since the early 2000s, Salisbury has grown rapidly in enrollment as well as campus facilities. Since 2002, Henson Hall, Conway Hall, Perdue Hall, the Patricia R. Guererri Academic Commons, and Sea Gull Stadium have been constructed.

From July 1, 2018 through July 14, 2022, the university was under the leadership of president Charles "Chuck" Wight. Wight succeeded Janet Dudley-Eshbach, who, after 18 years as SU's president, opted to return to teaching foreign language at SU, following one year in hiatus training Wight. Carolyn Ringer Lepre began her term as the 10th president of Salisbury University on July 15, 2022.

Following two incidents of racist vandalism in 2019, students asked for "the safety and inclusion of black students and other minority groups on campus". After a third incident, in 2020, the president cancelled classes for a Day of Healing. In June 2020, "an African American man" confessed to having caused the vandalism.

In May 2024, the university announced during a public city council meeting that a new $100 million performing arts complex will be built downtown in four to five years. The project will include a thousand seat theatre, a smaller 450 seat music and theatre space, a dance studio and other supporting amenities. The location currently houses the Wicomico Public Library, which the university will help relocate to a building that it owns and will lease for $1 a year during this transition to a newly renovated building.

== Campus facilities ==
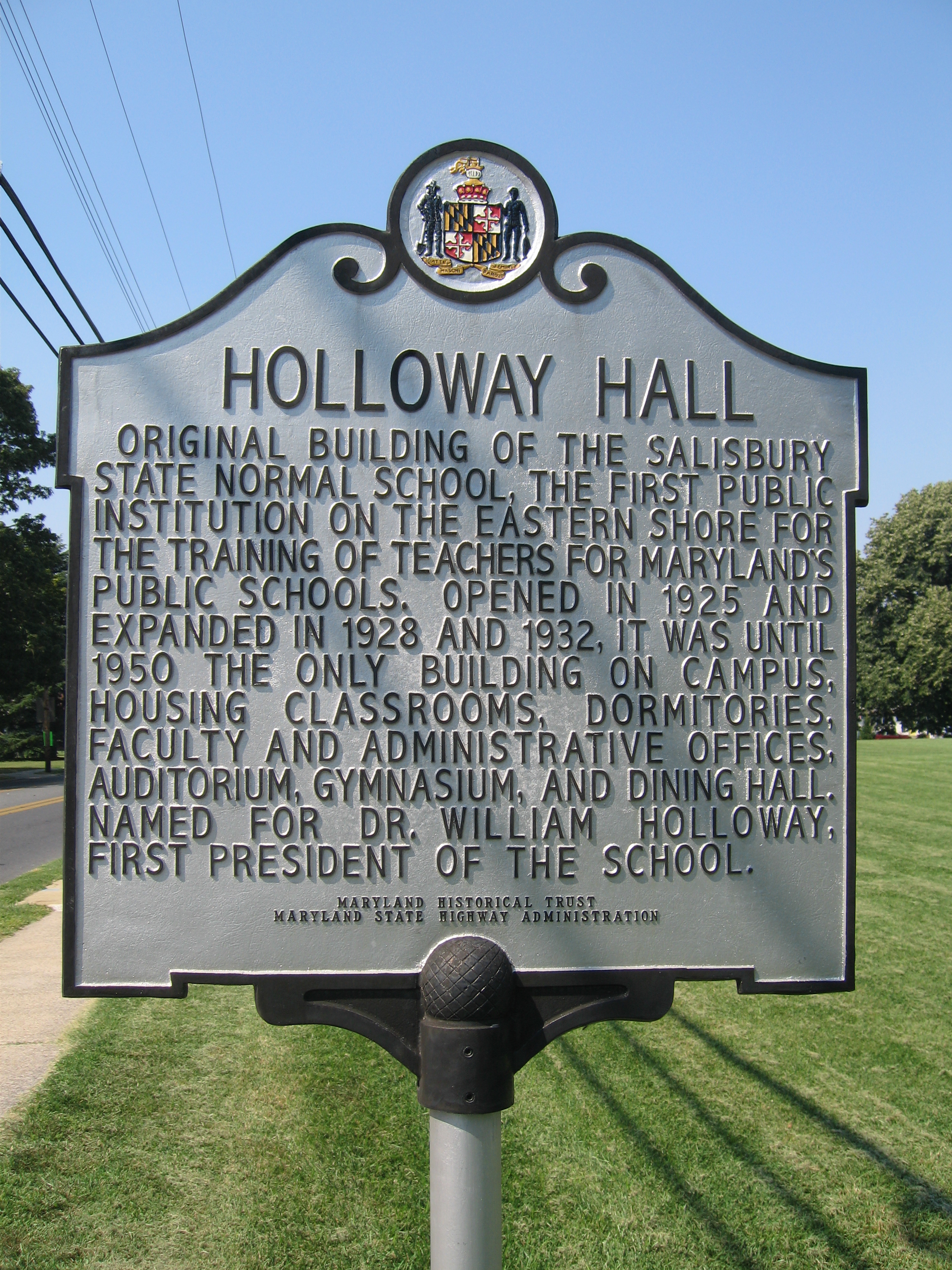
Holloway Hall historical marker

Salisbury University owns 75 buildings, with a total gross area of 2,158,078 square feet (200,492.0 m^{2}). The Salisbury University campus consists of 183 acres (0.74 km^{2}).

=== Holloway Hall ===
Holloway Hall served as the original home of Maryland State Normal School at Salisbury upon its opening in 1930. The structure once served as the home for all teaching, student, and administrative functions at the school. Today, the building – renamed Holloway Hall after the retirement of Salisbury's first president, William J. Holloway – houses administrative offices, including the office of the president, the office of the provost, financial aid, registrar, public relations, student health services, and human resources.

The building also contains a number of unique, multi-purpose spaces, including the auditorium (seating capacity of 713) and the great hall (originally used as the dining hall and later as the home for the Ward Museum of Wildfowl Art). The classroom space in the north wing of the structure was once the home of the Perdue School of Business.

=== Fulton Hall ===
Fulton Hall serves as home for the Charles R. and Martha N. Fulton School of Liberal Arts at Salisbury University. The building serves as the north anchor of the campus's central mall. As the structure closest to Holloway Hall, Fulton Hall was built to complement Holloway's classical architecture styling.

Fulton Hall includes the main university gallery (home to temporary art exhibitions), classrooms, fine arts studios, photography lab, and a glass blowing facility. The building is also home to many of the university's performing arts facilities, including a 150-seat black box theater (featuring a flexible 50 x 50 ft performance space), scene shop, costume shop, and music rehearsal facilities.

=== Conway Hall ===
Conway Hall at Salisbury University

Conway Hall, formerly known as the Teacher Education and Technology Center, opened for use at the beginning of the 2008 fall semester. In 2009, the 165,000-square-foot (15,300 m^{2}) building earned silver certification from the Leadership in Energy and Environmental Design (LEED) certification system under the United States Green Building Council. The building was also named one of the ten best-designed new higher education facilities by College Planning & Management magazine as part of its "2009 Education Design Showcase" issue.

The facility houses flexible classroom space, multi-purpose computer lab space, a satellite dining facility, distance-learning classrooms, integrated SMART classroom technology, and offices and support services for the Seidel School, Fulton School, and information technology. The showcase integrated media center, located on the third floor of the facility, includes both high-definition and standard-definition television production studios, twenty individual editing suites (video-audio), and audio production facilities.

The building was renamed in April 2016 for former Maryland Delegate Norman Conway, who as chairman of the House Appropriations Committee assisted SU in securing funding for the project, and is an SU alumnus.

=== Henson Hall ===
Henson Hall was dedicated on September 5, 2002, and contains classroom, support, and laboratory space for the Henson School of Science and Technology. Built at a cost of $37 million, the 145,500-square-foot (13,520 m^{2}) facility houses the departments of biology, chemistry, physics, mathematics and computer science, and geography and geosciences. The building holds 12 classrooms, 32 teaching laboratories, and 20 research labs. Henson Hall also houses a satellite dining facility, which students call "the Airport" in reference to the building's namesake, test pilot Richard A. Henson.

=== Perdue Hall ===
The new building for the Franklin P. Perdue School of Business was partially funded by an $8 million gift from the Arthur W. Perdue Foundation. Perdue, Inc., chairman Jim Perdue said the donation was in honor of his father, former Perdue Farms president Frank Perdue. The 112,800-square-foot (10,480 m^{2}), $56 million facility houses classroom and office space formerly located in the north wing of Holloway Hall.

The university was awarded gold certification from the LEED certification system under the United States Green Building Council for the Perdue building. The facility includes a Business Outreach Services Suite (BOSS), a Small Business Development Center, a Perdue Museum, meeting rooms, focus-group rooms, specialized business lab space, an internet cafe, and an M.B.A. suite with case rooms.

=== Patricia R. Guerrieri Academic Commons ===
Opened in the fall of 2016, the Patricia R. Guerrieri Academic Commons (GAC) officially opened as the largest and tallest building on campus. The facility cost $117 million and houses the student library, IT help desk, Edward H. Nabb Research Center for Delmarva History and Culture, writing center, center for student achievement, a math emporium, and a 3D printing lab.

The building contains 400 computers for public use, Chesapeake Bay Roasting Company and Hungry Minds Express food vendors, and 15 study rooms situated around the four-story, 221,000-square-foot academic commons. The library participates in an inter-campus loan program where students can order books from other university libraries within the University System of Maryland for temporary use.

The library was named one of the "Top 20" in the United States by the Princeton Review in their 2021 "Best 386 Colleges", alongside other higher education institutions such as Columbia University and Williams College.

=== Guerrieri Student Union/The Commons ===
Guerrieri Student Union and Gazebo Hill at Salisbury University

The south end of campus is home to the Guerrieri Student Union (GSU) and The Commons, both buildings are joined by an indoor walkway called the "Link of Nations". The GSU houses the office of student affairs, student activities office, two eateries (Chick-fil-A and internet cafe Cool Beans), career services office, the center for student achievement, and a large, multi-level lounge space.

The Commons contains the campus bookstore and post office located in the basement, the main dining hall facility located on the first floor, and conference rooms located on the second floor.

=== Off-campus housing ===
Salisbury University houses approximately 40% of all students in 2,648 spaces of campus-affiliated housing, with freshmen given priority in traditional housing. In addition to the on-campus residence buildings, Salisbury has partnerships with four nearby off-campus apartment complexes and one townhome neighborhood, Seagull Village, The Flatts, The Gathering, University Orchard, and University Park, with residents of these facilities (with the exception of Seagull Village) having access to a shuttle system to the main campus. The Gathering is a townhome neighborhood located about five minutes away from the main campus.

Seagull Village was originally intended to house international students only and had been leased by the university, however, Salisbury University ultimately bought the apartment complex for $3.6 million in March 2022, allowing any students to move into Seagull Village starting in fall 2022.

A new off-campus apartment complex, labeled "The Ross", opened in August 2023, in time for the fall 2023 semester. The Ross is the furthest off-campus complex away from the school, located six minutes away from the main campus (roughly 2.2 miles). It is known as one of the tallest buildings in the Delmarva peninsula.

=== Honors House ===
Pocomoke Hall, residence hall at Salisbury University

The Thomas E. Bellavance Honors House was established in 2000, and is located off Camden Avenue, across east campus. It is open to students in the Clarke Honors College, and includes a full kitchen, computer lab, and grand piano. The yard contains a gazebo, goldfish pond, and a Japanese garden.

=== Campus grounds: arboretum status ===
The Salisbury University campus was recognized by the American Association of Botanical Gardens and Arboreta as an arboretum in 1988. The Salisbury campus features over 2,000 species of plant life, including magnolia, rhododendron, viburnum, Japanese maple, bald cypress, and Crape myrtle. Notable areas of interest on campus include the Pergola (near the University Commons), the Holloway Hall Courtyard Garden, the Bellavance Honors Center Japanese Garden, the Link of Nations, and the Miller Alumni Garden. The campus also features a collection of figurative sculpture, including pieces by such noted sculptors as Auguste Rodin (Coquelin Cadet), Daniel Chester French (Ralph Waldo Emerson), Augustus Saint-Gaudens (Diana), and Carl Akeley (Wounded Comrade).

== Academic schools and programs ==
There are six academic units at the university, five of which are endowed.

Name of college	Facility
Fulton School of Liberal Arts	Fulton Hall
Henson School of Science and Technology	Henson Hall & Devilbiss Hall
Perdue School of Business	Perdue Hall
Seidel School of Education	Conway Hall
College of Health and Human Services	
Glenda Chatham and Robert G. Clarke Honors College	Honors House

Popular undergraduate majors include biology/biological sciences, business administration and management, kinesiology and exercise science, and psychology. The school's nursing program is well known for its difficulty and selective admissions.

The Thomas E. Bellavance Honors Program was established in 1981, and the Glenda Chatham and Robert G. Clarke Honors College was created in 2016, and endowed in 2020.

The Business, Economic, and Community Outreach Network (BEACON) is the applied research, experiential learning, and community outreach arm of the Franklin P. Perdue School of Business at Salisbury University.

The Institute for Public Affairs and Civic Engagement (PACE) was launched in 1999 to promote non-partisan civic engagement.

=== Clarke Honors College ===
The National Collegiate Honors Council named the Clarke Honors College publication The Saunterer the No. 1 honors print newsletter in the U.S. in 2017, 2019 and 2022.

=== College of Health and Human Services ===
The Center for Healthy Communities, established in 2020, promotes CHHS efforts in community-based learning, community service grants, workforce development and professional continuing education opportunities. Programs include the School of Social Work’s Behavioral Integration in Pediatric Primary Care (BHIPP) and School of Nursing’s Faculty Academic and Mentorship Initiative of Maryland

In 2019, CHHS extended program offerings across the state with the launch of SU’s bachelor's degree public health (then community health) at the University of Maryland at Hagerstown (USMH) and master's degree in health and human performance (then applied health physiology) at the Universities at Shady Grove (USG).

In addition, the School of Social Work offers students across Maryland and abroad the opportunity to pursue degrees, with satellite programs through Cecil College, the Eastern Shore Higher Education Center at Chesapeake College, USM at Southern Maryland, USM at Hagerstown, and University of Maryland Global Campus Europe. The school also offers a dual-degree program in social work/sociology with the University of Maryland Eastern Shore.

=== Fulton School of Liberal Arts ===
Students in the Fulton School’s Creative Writing Program have published poems and short stories in national peer-reviewed journals and literary magazines.

Speakers in the "One Person Can Make a Difference Series", hosted by the Fulton School’s Bosserman Center for Conflict Resolution, have included Nobel laureates Lech Walesa (former president of Poland) and F.W. de Klerk (former president of South Africa).

In 2020, the United Nations designated the Bosserman Center as the home of United Nations University Regional Centre for Expertise Salisbury, a designated hub of expertise in conflict prevention and creative problem solving. Through the Bosserman Center, SU also has been a designated United Nations Millennium Campus. Since 2020, some 29 SU students have been named UN Millennium Fellows, designing projects to assist in the achievement of the UN Foundation’s 17 Sustainable Development Goals.

Speakers in SU’s Paul S. Sarbanes Lecture Series, hosted by the Fulton School-affiliated Institute for Public Affairs and Civic Engagement, have included civil rights leader John Lewis and Speaker of the U.S. House Nancy Pelosi.

Philosophy students in the Fulton School participate in book discussion program with inmates at nearby Eastern Correctional Institution through a partnership between SU and the Maryland Department of Public Safety and Correctional Services.

Other unique offerings include the annual SU Philosophy Symposium, which has provided a forum for students and members of the greater community to discuss issues with philosophy scholars for more than 40 years, and “Re-envisioning Ethics Access and Community Humanities,” a National Endowment for the Humanities-funded program aimed at including an ethics component in undergraduate education experiences for fields including health, social work and public administration.

Six SU environmental studies students in the Fulton School have earned the prestigious U.S. Environmental Protection Agency Greater Research Opportunity (EPA-GRO) Fellowship, giving them the chance to work side-by-side with EPA officials through paid internships while also earning college funding for their junior and senior year, worth up to $50,000.

The Fulton School is the home of Lit/Film Quarterly, the longest-standing international journal devoted to the study of literature adaptation to film, founded in 1973.

=== Henson School of Science and Technology ===
SU’s M.S. in Geographic Information Systems (GIS) Management earned the American Association of Geographers 2022 Program Excellence Award.

The National Science Foundation has awarded Henson School faculty and students over $7 million in grant funding.

The Henson School’s high-performance computing lab, established using funds from a $2.5 million gift from the Richard A. Henson Foundation in 2017, features a Beowulf cluster designed for both classroom instruction as well as a research cluster.

The Eastern Shore Regional GIS Cooperative (ESRGC), founded in 2004, partners with municipal, county, regional, state and federal governments, as well as private and non-profit organizations, in an effort to develop data-driven decision-making tools. The cooperative has established over 50 partnerships and are the Eastern Shore’s leader in GIS services.

In 2022, the Henson School opened SU’s REAL Robotics Lab, establishing a home base for the GULLS VEXU Robotics Team and research space for STEM students. The lab consists of drone and 3D printing labs, engineering workstations, and a competition standard VEX robotics arena.

=== Perdue School of Business ===
The Perdue School is home to the nation's second longest-running student entrepreneurship competition, first held in 1987, with a current annual prize pool of some $100,000.

Since 2013, the Perdue School also has been home to the Philip E. and Carole R. Ratcliffe Foundation Shore Hatchery entrepreneurship competition, through which small business owners and developers throughout the Mid-Atlantic vie twice a year for their share of a $200,000 prize pool and mentorship from some of the region's most successful business owners. Recipients have self-reported estimated profits of some $100 million, creating nearly 700 jobs.

The Perdue School's Mid-Atlantic Sales and Marketing Institute (MASMI) annually hosts students from around the U.S. for the National Shore Sales Challenge, a collegiate competition that allows students to sharpen their sales skills while networking with potential employers from more than a dozen national corporations.

Through a $2.6 million grant from the U.S. Department of Health and Human Services, Fraud and Forensic Accounting Certificate Program students in the Perdue School are partnering with the Office of the State's Attorney of Worcester County to help investigate and curb elder fraud in what is believed to be the only program of its kind in the nation.

Through the Cross-Atlantic Negotiation Competition, Perdue School students virtually join their counterparts at the University of Bucharest School of Law to practice international negotiation skills as part of a Fulbright-inspired faculty partnership.

The Perdue School's Dave and Patsy Rommel Center for Entrepreneurship provides business and prototyping resources for students and community members, including a full makerspace.

In 2026, Fortune Magazine ranked the MBA program at Perdue School of Business 30th in the country, ahead of all other universities in Maryland.

== Admissions and enrollment ==
Undergraduate demographics as of Fall 2023
Race and ethnicity	Total
White	69%
Black	14%
Hispanic	7%
Two or more races	4%
Asian	3%
Unknown	2%
International student	1%
Economic diversity
Low-income (Note: The percentage of students who received an income-based federal Pell grant intended for low-income students.)	24%
Affluent (Note: The percentage of students who are a part of the American middle class at the bare minimum.)	76%

=== Admissions ===
For undergraduate admissions for the fall 2022 entry term, Salisbury received 7,691 applications and offered admission to 86% of those applicants. In the fall of 2006, the Faculty Senate at Salisbury University approved a plan to make the SAT an optional submission for admission to the university.

For 2022–23, tuition and fees for Maryland residents were $10,396 annually, $20,872 for non-Maryland residents. Average room and board cost was $12,780.

=== Enrollment ===
Between 2009 and 2022, the total enrollment varied between 8,204 and 7,123; in 2022, 83.4% were Maryland residents. In 2022, there were 5,853 full-time undergraduates, 525 part-time undergraduates, 433 full-time graduate students, and 312 part-time graduate students. In 2022, the undergraduate student body was 71.0% white, 13.9% African American, 11.2% other minority, and 1.2% non-resident alien (i.e., international student). In 2022, among all students, 54.7% were from the Western Shore of Maryland, 28.7% were from the Eastern Shore of Maryland, 14.2% were from out-of-state, and 2.4% were international students.

=== Graduation rates and outcomes ===
In 2022, according to the U.S. Department of Education's College Scorecard, 79% of full-time undergraduate students returned after their first year, and the six-year graduate rate was 71%. Among full-time students, 8 years after enrolling, some 71% had graduated, 22% has transferred, and 7% withdrew. The median annual earnings of students who received federal financial aid, 10 years after entering the university, was $53,388.

== Athletics ==
Salisbury's athletic teams, known as the Sea Gulls, compete in NCAA Division III. The football team competes in the New Jersey Athletic Conference while all other sports participate in the Coast to Coast Athletic Conference.

SU is well known for the success of its athletic programs, amassing 22 national championships in team sports and 24 individual national championships in track and field and wrestling.

13 of those team sports titles are in Men's lacrosse, including a stretch from 2003 to 2008 where the lacrosse team won 5 national titles with 3 straight titles, and won 114 out of its 115 games including 69 straight wins.

== Relay For Life ==
The American Cancer Society's Relay For Life is the largest on-campus event at Salisbury University. SU's Relay For Life has consistently raised thousands of dollars annually, making Salisbury University one of the top Relay teams, per capita, in the nation, raising over 1.5 million dollars since its inception. The event traditionally takes place at Maggs Physical Activities Center and Perdue Hall Lawn.

== Sea Gull Century ==
This annual bike ride, usually held the first weekend in October, brings thousands of riders to Delmarva, in what is the largest single-day tourism event in Wicomico County. The 100-mile (160 km) ride has been named among the top ten century rides in the nation by Bicycling Magazine. The Washington Post named it "by far the most popular local century" in the Maryland-Delaware-Virginia region. The ride starts and ends at SU, offering two routes. It is well known for its scenic halfway point at Assateague Island.

== Internationalization and study abroad ==
=== Study-abroad programs ===
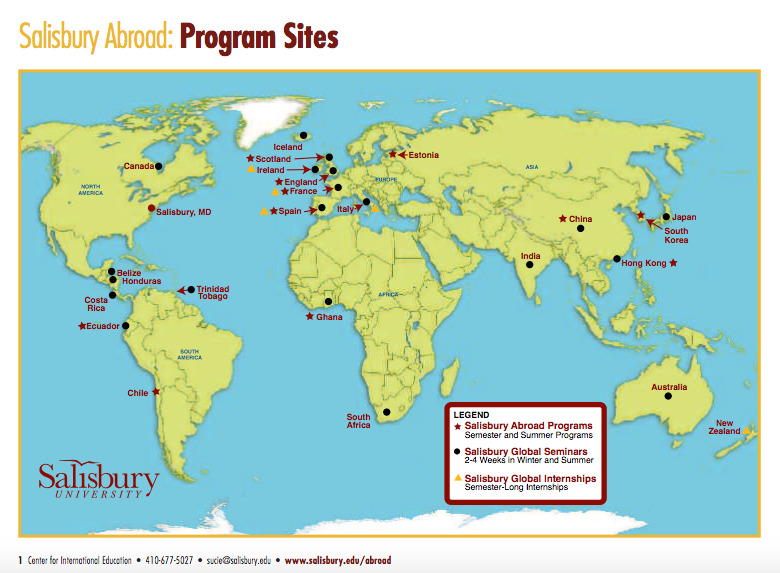
Locations of Salisbury Abroad Programs, Salisbury Global Seminars, and Salisbury Global Internships

Salisbury students have the opportunity to attend study-abroad courses through the Salisbury Abroad Semester Program. This program is offered primarily during the Fall and Spring semesters, but courses are also offered during the shorter Winter term. While abroad, SU students and other international students study with local students and immerse themselves in their country of interest. In these programs, all classes are taught by local professors.

=== International students and English Language Institute ===
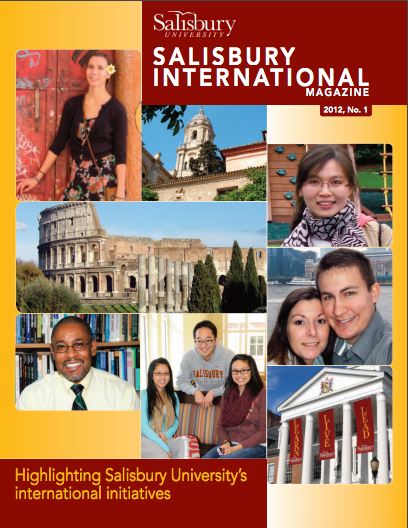
SU International magazine (2012, Volume 1)

In the early 2010s, approximately 18 percent of the Salisbury University student population studied abroad, slightly higher than the national undergraduate average of 14% during the 2010–11 academic year. In 2011, the U.S Department of State designated Salisbury University as an authorized participant in the J-1 Exchange Visitor program, in the categories of Student and Professor.

The university created the English Language Institute (ELI) in 2010.

International students represent 2% of the student population at Salisbury University, which is less than University of Maryland College Park (10%), Towson University (6–7%), University of Maryland Baltimore County (6–7%), and University of Maryland Eastern Shore (4–5%).

In 2010, Salisbury University established a sister-institution partnership with Anqing Teachers College, in Anhui Province, China. The first two Salisbury University undergraduate students to study there did so during the entire Fall Semester in 2010. In turn, two undergraduate students and one graduate student were the first Chinese students to come to Salisbury University from Anqing.

== Greek life ==
There are a number of sororities and fraternities on campus.

== Notable alumni ==
Frances Tiafoe

- Eric Arndt, wrestler
- Jake Bergey, lacrosse player
- Steve Bisciotti, owner of the Baltimore Ravens
- Talmadge Branch, member of the Maryland House of Delegates
- Eric M. Bromwell, member of the Maryland House of Delegates
- Norman Conway, member of the Maryland House of Delegates
- Jeannie Haddaway-Riccio, member of the Maryland House of Delegates
- Kyle Hartzell, lacrosse player
- Tae Johnson, director of U.S. Immigration and Customs Enforcement
- Scott Krinsky, actor and comedian known for Chuck
- Erica Messer, writer for The OC, Alias, and Criminal Minds
- Dale Midkiff, actor
- Frank Perdue, former president of Perdue Farms; major contributor to Salisbury University
- Jim Perdue, chairman of Perdue Farms
- Dan Quinn, football coach
- Justin Ready, member of the Maryland State Senate
- Kenneth D. Schisler, former chair of the Maryland Public Service Commission
- Mike Seidel, Fox Weather meteorologist
- J. Lowell Stoltzfus, member of the Maryland State Senate
- Kris Valderrama, member of the Maryland House of Delegates
- Kristen Visbal, sculptor known for Fearless Girl
- Byron Westbrook, football player
- Mary Willis, brigadier general
- Jennifer Hope Wills, actress
- Frances Tiafoe, professional tennis player
