= Perdue Farms =

American meat processing company

- Type: Private
- Industry: Meat processing Poultry farming
- Founded: 1920
- Founder: Arthur W. Perdue; Pearl Perdue
- Headquarters: Salisbury, Maryland
- Key people: Jim Perdue, Chairman; Kevin McAdams, CEO
- Products: Poultry, chicken, turkey, pork, grain
- Revenue: $9.2 billion (2025)
- Number of employees: 20,590 (2026)
- Parent: FPP Family Investments, Inc.
- Subsidiaries: Perdue Foods; Perdue AgriBusiness; Perdue Premium Meat Company
- Website: Official website

Perdue Farms is the parent company of Perdue Foods and Perdue AgriBusiness, based in Salisbury, Maryland. Perdue Foods processes chicken, turkey and pork, and Perdue AgriBusiness trades grain, mills feed and processes soybeans. The company is owned by the Perdue family through the holding company FPP Family Investments and is one of the largest chicken producers in the United States.

Arthur W. Perdue founded the business in 1920 to sell eggs. Under his son Frank Perdue, it moved into raising and then processing chickens, became vertically integrated, and began selling chicken under the Perdue name in 1968. Frank's son Jim Perdue has been chairman since 1991. Since 2011, the company has bought several premium meat businesses, including Coleman Natural Foods and Niman Ranch, and it has moved to raising its chickens without antibiotics.

== History ==
=== Founding and early years ===
The company was founded in 1920 by Arthur Perdue with his wife, Pearl Perdue, who had been keeping a small flock of chickens. The company started out selling table eggs, then in 1925, Perdue built the company's first hatchery, and switched to selling layer chicks to farmers instead of eggs. His son Frank Perdue joined the company in 1939 at age 19 after dropping out of college.

In the early 1940s, Perdue switched its main business from selling eggs to selling chickens to farmers. Frank Perdue took over from his father as president in 1952, by which time the company was selling about 2.6 million birds a year and had sales of $6 million.

=== Vertical integration and the Perdue brand ===
The company was incorporated as A.W. Perdue & Son and Frank Perdue assumed leadership in the 1950s. The company also began contracting with local farmers to raise its birds and supplying chickens for processing as well as opening a second hatchery in North Carolina during this period. After the war, the company began selling chicken feed, and during the 1950s and 1960s it introduced crossbreeding to improve its birds and widened the range of grains it handled.

Perdue entered the grain and oilseed business by building grain receiving and storage facilities and Maryland's first soybean processing plant. The soybean mill was financed in 1961 with the company's first bank borrowing, a $500,000 note signed by Arthur Perdue at the age of 76. By 1967, Perdue owned grain storage, feed mills, soybean plants and a hatchery, contracted with about 600 farmers to raise its birds, and had sales above $35 million.

In 1968, the company began operating its first poultry processing plant in Salisbury. This move had two effects: it gave Perdue Farms full vertical integration and quality control over every step from egg and feed to market, as well as increasing profits which were being squeezed by processors. This move enabled the company to differentiate its product, rather than selling a commodity. The Perdue brand reached retail meat counters the same year, aimed first at the New York City market, and the company later extended its distribution to Boston, Baltimore, Washington and Philadelphia and then to Miami, Chicago and the Midwest. In 1971, Perdue opened a processing complex at Accomac, Virginia, which grew into one of the largest poultry plants on the Delmarva Peninsula. In 1974, the company introduced the Oven Stuffer Roaster, a whole roasting chicken sold with a pop-up thermometer.

In the early 1970s, the company hired the New York advertising agency Scali, McCabe, Sloves, whose campaign put Frank Perdue himself on television and radio and in print with the slogan "It takes a tough man to make a tender chicken". The campaign made Perdue the first widely recognized brand of chicken in the United States. He had appeared in more than 175 commercials by 1994, when his son Jim was introduced as his successor in the advertising, and Jim replaced him as the company's spokesman in January 1995, when a national campaign fronted by the younger Perdue began after nine months of test marketing in Richmond and Albany, New York.

Arthur Perdue died in 1977, aged 91, and Frank Perdue became chairman two years later. In 1983, Perdue became the first poultry company to print nutrition labels on its products, and Jim Perdue joined the business as a quality-control management trainee. Around the same time, after Holly Farms began selling nuggets and fillets, Perdue answered with Perdue Done It!, a line of breaded, precooked nuggets and cutlets. By 1984, annual sales had reached 260 million birds and revenue reached $741 million. In 1986, Frank Perdue gave $2.4 million to endow the business school at Salisbury University, which named it the Franklin P. Perdue School of Business. He gave a further $1 million in 1994 after the school's programs were accredited, and the endowment marked its fortieth anniversary in 2026. In 2006, an $8 million gift from the Perdue foundation was announced for a new building for the school. Frank Perdue gave up the post of chief executive in 1988 and was succeeded by a long-serving executive, Donald Mabe.

=== Third generation ===
In 1991, Frank's son Jim Perdue was named Chairman, becoming the third generation of leaders from the Perdue family. Mabe retired the same year, and Frank Perdue stepped down as chairman.

In the 1990s, the company started experimenting with shaped nuggets, releasing star-shaped and football-shaped products. In February 1991, Perdue filed a trademark application for a dinosaur-shaped chicken nugget, which it abandoned in 1993. The company has stated that it believes it invented the product but cannot prove it.

The company opened a plant at Dillon, South Carolina, in 1992 and added a feed mill, hatchery and grain storage the following year. In 1994, it acquired Howell Farms and a plant in Milford, Delaware. The same year it introduced Short Cuts, strips of fully cooked chicken breast sold in the refrigerated case. By then, Perdue employed 13,500 people and its weekly output exceeded seven million chickens and three million turkeys, which made it the largest poultry producer in the Northeast. In January 1995 it bought Showell Farms, a Maryland company with 4,800 employees and an output of three million chickens a week, which made Perdue the third-largest poultry processor in the United States, with 18,600 employees and weekly output of more than 11 million chickens and 3.1 million pounds of turkey. In 1996, it began selling precooked chicken in Japan and entered Russia, with international sales reaching a tenth of the total. The company reported a loss for 1996 because of high grain prices, with sales estimated at $2.1 billion.

=== Restructuring and acquisitions ===
In 2010, the corporate structure of Perdue Farms changed. A holding company, FPP Family Investments, Inc., owned by the Perdue family, became the controlling entity for Perdue Farms. The holding company also owns Perdue AgriBusiness, a grain operation; FPP Business Services, a shared business services company; and Coleman Natural Foods. The Coleman purchase, completed in May 2011 after antitrust clearance from the Department of Justice, brought in a seller of natural and specialty meats, including free-range chicken, that was stocked by retailers such as Whole Foods.

In September 2015, Perdue agreed to buy Natural Food Holdings from the private-equity firm LNK Partners, adding the Niman Ranch brand, the Prairie Grove pork brand and SiouxPreme Packing's plants in Iowa, and extending the company into pork, beef and lamb raised without antibiotics. In 2017, it grouped these businesses into Perdue Premium Meat Company, which acquired the organic grass-fed beef producer Panorama Meats in May 2019 and the Michigan sausage maker Alexander & Hornung in February 2020.

In March 2017, Jim Perdue, chairman of Perdue Farms, announced Randy Day would be promoted from COO to CEO. Day would be the fourth CEO in the company's history. Perdue would remain as the chairman of the board of directors. Day retired as CEO in July 2023 and was succeeded by Perdue's chief operating officer Kevin McAdams.

In August 2024, Perdue Foods recalled about 167,000 pounds of frozen chicken nuggets and tenders sold under its Simply Smart Organics, Perdue and Butcher Box labels after consumers found strands of metal wire in the products. No injuries were reported. In January 2025, the company said it would close its processing plant in Monterey, Tennessee, eliminating 433 jobs, citing changes in demand and the investment the plant would have needed. Forbes put the company's revenue at $9.2 billion in its 2026 ranking of the largest private American companies, down from about $11 billion three years earlier.

== Operations ==
=== Corporate structure ===
Since the 2010 reorganization, the group has been owned through FPP Family Investments, a Perdue family holding company in Salisbury that controls Perdue Farms, Perdue AgriBusiness, FPP Business Services, which provides shared accounting and information-technology services, and the premium-meat businesses.

Other subsidiaries include Heritage Breeders, LLC, which is responsible for developing the breed used by Perdue, and developing other lines of stock for sale to other poultry companies; Venture Milling, which creates proteins for livestock; Perdue Fats and Proteins, LLC, which sells pet and animal feed ingredients; Perdue BioEnergy, LLC, which works in the field of renewable energies; and Perdue AgriRecycle, which converts poultry litter into organic fertilizer products.

=== Facilities ===
Perdue is headquartered in Salisbury, on Maryland's Eastern Shore, where it opened its first processing plant in 1968. Through the Franklin P. and Arthur W. Perdue Foundation, its charitable arm, the company has supported the Salisbury branch of the Maryland Food Bank for most of the branch's 45 years, including an expansion of the branch's cold storage and its first mobile food market. In September 2025, the company delivered 80,000 pounds of frozen chicken to the branch, part of a donation of 800,000 pounds to ten food banks along the East Coast. Its complex at Accomac, Virginia, opened in 1971, employs about 1,850 people at full capacity, can handle as many as 400,000 chickens a day and makes the company the largest private employer on the Eastern Shore of Virginia. Other processing plants have included Dillon, South Carolina; Milford, Delaware; Kathleen, Georgia, which had about 600 employees in 2020; and Monterey, Tennessee, which closed in 2025. Perdue Premium Meat Company's plants include SiouxPreme Packing in Sioux Center, Iowa, which completed a $29 million expansion in 2020, and Alexander & Hornung in St. Clair Shores, Michigan.

Perdue AgriBusiness operates a soybean-crushing plant and grain export terminal in Chesapeake, Virginia, where, in 2022, it announced a $59.1 million expansion to produce soybean meal and oil. The division buys about 80 percent of Virginia's soybean crop. It also runs a soybean processing plant in Salisbury.

=== Brands ===
Chicken is sold under the Perdue, Harvestland and Simply Smart names. Perdue Premium Meat Company's brands include Coleman Natural, Niman Ranch, Prairie Grove, Panorama Organic and Alexander & Hornung.

== Criticisms and controversies ==
=== Animal welfare and antibiotics ===
According to Perdue, the company had eliminated antibiotics used in human medicine from its chicken feed by 2007. That year, Perdue launched its Harvestland brand, which included products that met the requirements for an "antibiotic-free" label. By 2014, Harvestland had reached $200 million in sales, and Perdue announced that it had removed all antibiotics, including ionophores, from its hatchery. The company also began using "antibiotic-free" labels on its Harvestland, Simply Smart and Perfect Portions products.

Perdue has been criticized for its factories' lack of adherence to some basic animal-welfare practices. The guidelines that Perdue follows, created by the National Chicken Council, have drawn criticism for allowing birds to be deprived of light, food, and water for long periods, and also for permitting animals to be hung upside-down by their ankles before slaughter. In 2010, the Humane Society of the United States filed a lawsuit against Perdue for violating a New Jersey consumer fraud law by applying the labels "purely all-natural" and "humanely raised" to its products when reasonable consumers would not consider the conditions Perdue chickens are raised in "humane." The Humane Society filed a similar lawsuit in Florida in April 2013 after an appeal by Perdue to have a similar case rejected was turned down by a federal court. In response, Perdue issued a statement claiming that its practice "exceeds the National Chicken Council guidelines in several areas, including monitoring air quality in the poultry house, video monitoring of live-bird handling areas at the processing plant and USDA audits of producer farms and...hatcheries."

In October 2014, Perdue agreed to drop the "humanely raised" claim from its Harvestland packaging, and the two class actions, filed in New Jersey in 2010 and Florida in 2013, were dismissed with prejudice. The company maintained that its labels had not been misleading. In 2016, the company published a set of animal-care commitments drawn up with input from advocacy groups, and by 2018 it had undertaken to put windows in all of its chicken houses, to identify slower-growing breeds and to adopt higher-welfare stunning methods.

Since 2016, Perdue has been holding an Annual Animal Care and Sustainability Summit. In 2026, the event was expanded to include sustainability, and the company released the 2026 Animal Care Report, which documented progress across 121 animal care initiatives active since 2016.

=== Environmental record ===
Perdue has also been criticized for allegedly polluting the Chesapeake Bay. In 2010, the Assateague Coastal Trust sued Perdue for violating the Clean Water Act by allegedly allowing excessive chicken manure to run into the bay. The suit was later won by Perdue in December 2012, after the environmental group failed to establish that the waste runoff was from chicken houses.

In July 2024, Perdue AgriBusiness agreed to a $12 million settlement with the Maryland Department of the Environment over its soybean plant in Salisbury, which had installed new equipment in 2022 without the air permit it had applied for and then withdrawn in 2017. The settlement comprised an $8 million penalty, $3.5 million of on-site pollution controls and $400,000 for environmental projects in the city. The company's chief executive said it took "full accountability".

=== Labor relations ===
It has been reported that in the 1980s, Perdue twice sought assistance from then-Mafia boss Paul Castellano to fend off a union's effort to represent workers at the company, according to a federal commission on labor corruption.

In March 2020, early in the COVID-19 pandemic, workers at the Kathleen, Georgia, plant walked out, saying the plant was not being sanitized adequately. Perdue put the number at about two dozen of 600 employees, while local reports said about 50. The company said it had begun sanitizing all facilities daily and had made paid leave more flexible.

In January 2025, Perdue agreed to pay $4 million in restitution and a $150,000 civil penalty to resolve findings by the Department of Labor that it and a staffing contractor, SMX, had since at least 2020 jointly employed children at the Accomac plant to debone chicken with electric knives and to work past 7 p.m. on school nights. The company said it disagreed with the findings but that a prolonged dispute "did nothing to address the child labor crisis". The agreement also bars the company from using minors at certain locations and requires child-labor training for managers and a tip line for reporting violations.

=== Antitrust litigation ===
Perdue was a defendant in Jien v. Perdue Farms, a class action filed in 2019 in the United States District Court for the District of Maryland that accused poultry processors of holding down plant workers' wages for more than a decade by exchanging compensation data, partly through the data firm Agri Stats. Perdue denied the allegations and agreed in December 2022 to pay $60.7 million to settle the claims against it. The settlements in the case, totaling about $398 million, received final approval in June 2025.

In July 2026, a federal judge in Chicago dismissed Perdue and Foster Farms from a class action accusing turkey processors of coordinating output to raise prices between about 2010 and 2016, finding the evidence insufficient to show that either company had joined the alleged agreement. Claims against Butterball and other processors continued.

== See also ==
- Labor rights in American meatpacking industry
