= Purdue (disambiguation) =

Purdue may refer to:

- Purdue University, a land-grant, public university in West Lafayette, Indiana, United States
  - Purdue Boilermakers, the athletic program of Purdue University
  - Purdue University System, a public university system within the state of Indiana, centered on the West Lafayette campus
- Purdue Pharma, a U.S. pharmaceuticals company

== People ==
- Charlotte Purdue (born 1991), British long-distance runner
- Connie Purdue (1912–2000), New Zealand trade unionist and Labour Party activist, who then became a conservative Catholic and anti-abortion activist
- Frank Purdue (1899–1985), Australian politician and Commander of the Order of the British Empire
- Jaxon Purdue (born 2005), Australian footballer
- John Purdue (1802–1876), American industrialist and primary original benefactor of Purdue University
- Phil Purdue (fl. 1990s–2010s), Irish rugby footballer
- John Purdue Gray, physician and co-founder of eponymous predecessor of Purdue Pharma

== See also ==
- Perdue (disambiguation)
