= Arthur Perdue =

American farmer

Arthur W. Perdue
- Born: August 8, 1885
- Died: June 27, 1977 (aged 91); Salisbury, Maryland

Arthur W. Perdue (1885–1977) was an American businessman and the founder of Perdue Farms along with his wife Pearl in 1920. The business was started in his backyard, and at the time only produced chicken eggs, and grew into a $4.1 billion company.

== Family and background ==
In the 1600s, Henri Perdue, a Huguenot, left France for the Province of Maryland to escape religious persecution. Perdue settled in what is now Wicomico and Worcester Counties and his descendants continue to live in the area.

Perdue was born in 1885 as the second of three children to Levin and Martha Perdue in Worcester County. His parents were devout and strict Methodists.

He married Pearl Parsons in 1917 and had one child in 1920, Frank Perdue.

== Career ==
In 1915, Arthur Perdue worked as a Railway Express agent in Salisbury, Maryland. By 1920, Perdue noticed that the chicken farmers on the Delmarva peninsula that were making money had shifted from selling chickens to selling table eggs. Perdue quit his job at the railroad and established his own commercial table-egg farm a few miles east of Salisbury, Maryland.

Perdue began focusing on quality and brought in Leghorn breeding stock from Texas to improve the quality of his flock. He then expanded his egg market, including to New York.

== Legacy ==
The Arthur W. Perdue Stadium in Salisbury, Maryland, is home to the Delmarva Shorebirds baseball team, a class A affiliate of the Baltimore Orioles in the South Atlantic League.

The Franklin P. and Arthur W. Perdue Foundation was established to support the communities where Perdue Farms has facilities.

In 2017, the farmhouse Perdue built in 1917 and lived in was added to the Maryland Inventory of Historic Properties.
