= Jim Perdue =

American businessman

Jim Perdue is an American businessman. He has been the chairman and advertising spokesperson of Perdue Farms since 1991. He is a third generation leader of the company founded by his grandfather in 1920.

In 1983, he joined Perdue as an entry-level management trainee and became chairman in 1991. Jim Perdue began appearing in commercials with his father in 1995. As of September 3, 2017, Jim can be seen doing commercials with his sons.
