= CNN This Morning with Audie Cornish =

- Title card (2025-present)
- Also known as: Early Start (2012–2024); CNN This Morning with Kasie Hunt (2024–2025)
- Genre: Morning television show
- Presented by: Audie Cornish
- Country of origin: United States
- Original language: English

Production
- Production locations: CNN Studios; Washington, D.C.
- Running time: 60 minutes

Original release
- Network: CNN; CNN International (since 2019)
- Release: January 2, 2012 – present

CNN This Morning with Audie Cornish is an American early-morning news program broadcast by CNN and CNN International. It is currently anchored by Audie Cornish and airs from 6:00 to 7:00 a.m. ET. The programme is also broadcast globally on CNN International. CNN This Morning is also available as a podcast.

It first premiered on January 2, 2012, as Early Start, acting as a compliment to CNN's then-new morning show Starting Point. The program was initially co-anchored by Ashleigh Banfield and Zoraida Sambolin, and would later be joined by John Berman. Banfield moved to CNN Newsroom in July 2012, while Sambolin departed in January 2014 and was replaced by Christine Romans. In January 2017, Berman also moved to CNN Newsroom, and was succeeded as co-anchor by Dave Briggs. He would in turn be succeeded by Laura Jarrett in January 2020.

Jarrett would leave CNN in July 2022, with Romans anchoring Early Start solo until her departure from the network in July 2023; she would be succeeded by Kasie Hunt. On February 26, 2024, the program was retitled CNN This Morning with Kasie Hunt (repurposing a title vacated by CNN's former weekday morning show), expanded back to two hours from 5:00 to 7:00 a.m, and relocated from New York to CNN's Washington, D.C. bureau.

On March 3, 2025, Hunt moved to the new afternoon show The Arena with Kasie Hunt, and was succeeded on CNN This Morning by Audie Cornish. Concurrently, the program was shortened back to an hour at 6:00 a.m. The following week, CNN reinstated the Early Start branding for a new 5:00 a.m. show hosted by Rahel Solomon, which would last until Solomon's departure from the network in 2026. The Early Start branding is currently unused.

== History ==
By the end of its run in 2011, CNN's American Morning had fallen behind in the morning ratings. Executive vice president Ken Jautz, who joined in September 2010, decided to revamp the network's morning lineup by canceling the show altogether and replacing it with two new programs less focused on national politics than cable rivals Fox & Friends and Morning Joe.

Along with Starting Point, Early Start replaced American Morning, which aired from 2001 to 2011. Ashleigh Banfield, who co-anchored with Sambolin until July 13, 2012, had since moved to the 12pm timeslot.

The new morning lineup was announced in November 2011 with Ashleigh Banfield and Zoraida Sambolin confirmed as anchors of the 5-7 a.m. program, while Soledad O'Brien joined as anchor of the 7-9 a.m. program. Banfield joined from ABC News while Sambolin was hired from Chicago NBC station WMAQ-TV. The name of the 5-7 a.m. program was announced as Early Start on Twitter on December 29. The program carried the tagline "News From A to Z", in reference to the co-anchors' first initials. On May 30, 2012, CNN announced ABC's John Berman would join Banfield and Sambolin as co-anchor. On June 26, 2012, CNN announced Banfield was leaving Early Start in July to anchor the 11am hour of CNN Newsroom. On December 13, 2013, Sambolin left the show and was replaced by Christine Romans in January 2014.

There was also a weekend broadcast from 6-7 a.m. ET, and was alternated between Poppy Harlow, Miguel Marquez, Alison Kosik, Randi Kaye and Victor Blackwell. It merely served as a lead-in to the subsequent five-hour CNN Newsroom, both anchored by the same host or duo. On June 22, 2013, due to the launch of New Day, it was decided that Weekend Early Start would be cancelled in favor of New Day Saturday and New Day Sunday.

One week leading up to the 2016 United States presidential election, Early Start ran from 3am to 5am ET, followed by an extended version of New Day from 5am to 9am ET. This schedule then becomes a standard for CNN during breaking news events.

In January 2017, John Berman left the program to anchor CNN Newsroom at 9am ET. CNN announced Dave Briggs, formerly of NBC Sports and Fox News, would succeed him. In December 2019, Briggs signed off from co-hosting the program. The next month, in January 2020, Laura Jarrett became the new co-host.

On July 1, 2022, Laura Jarrett co-anchored Early Start for the last time before departing for maternity leave, leaving Romans as the program's sole host (Jarrett would later move to NBC News). On July 28, 2023, Romans announced her departure from CNN. In August 2023, CNN announced that Kasie Hunt would become the new anchor of Early Start; she had previously hosted MSNBC's competing program Way Too Early prior to her 2021 departure to CNN.

In February 2024, concurrent with the cancellation of CNN This Morning, new CNN CEO Mark Thompson announced that Early Start would return to a two-hour format (after having been shortened to an hour), relocate from New York to CNN's Washington bureau (with support from staff in Atlanta), and be rebranded as CNN This Morning. The changes took effect on February 26, 2024, with the program being retitled CNN This Morning with Kasie Hunt, and adopting the graphics and theme music that were used by CNN This Morning.

In January 2025, CNN announced major upcoming changes to its schedule, which would see Hunt moved to the new 4 p.m. show The Arena with Kasie Hunt (which premiered on March 3), and Audie Cornish succeed her as the new anchor of CNN This Morning. The program would be cut back to an hour at 6 a.m., with the 5 a.m. hour slated to be replaced by a new program hosted by Rahel Solomon and produced by CNN International. While initially announced under the title 5 Things (making it an extension of one of CNN's digital features), it was later revealed by CNN that the new program would instead be branded as Early Start—reviving CNN This Morning's prior branding. The program, Early Start with Rahel Solomon, premiered on March 10, 2025.

== Notable moments ==
On the January 9, 2012, edition of the show, Banfield and Sambolin attempted to call comedian Chuck Nice as part of the "Wake 'Em Up" segment. Instead, the show dialed the wrong number and woke up an unknown man. The episode was skewered by Jon Stewart on The Daily Show, who also mocked the format of the segment.

== Notable on-air staff ==
=== Former ===
- Ashleigh Banfield (January 2 – July 13, 2012)
- Rob Marciano (January 2 – December 21, 2012)
- Zoraida Sambolin (January 2, 2012 – December 13, 2013)
- John Berman (July 17, 2012 – February 16, 2017)
- Christine Romans (January 3, 2014 – July 28, 2023)
- Dave Briggs (February 18, 2017 – December 20, 2019)
- Laura Jarrett (January 2, 2020 – July 1, 2022)
- Kasie Hunt (September 2023 – March 3, 2025)

== Segments ==
- Group Chat: Discussion with various panelists.
- 5 Things to See (5 Things): 5 news stories to start your day (similar to the CNN podcast and newsletter of the same name).
- Right Now: The roundup of the day's headlines.
- The Assignment: Highlight of the program that airs as a podcast with Audie Cornish every Thursday.

Former segments

- CNN Business Now (formerly CNN Money Stream): The latest business headlines from CNN Business.
- The Bleacher Report: A round-up of sports news at approximately 20 past the hour.
- 3 questions in 3 minutes: In which each journalist answers three political questions in three minutes.

Preceded by CNN Headline Express	CNN This Morning with Audie Cornish; 6:00 am – 7:00 am	Succeeded by CNN News Central
