= Dave Briggs (journalist) =

American television journalist

- Born: October 11, 1976 (age 49)
- Education: University of Colorado at Boulder
- Occupation: Television journalist

Dave Briggs (born October 11, 1976) is an American television journalist.

Dave Briggs was a co-host on CNN's Early Start with Christine Romans, which debuted Thursday, February 23, 2017, and a relief co-host of CNN's New Day, a three-hour morning news show. During the December 19, 2019 broadcast of the show, he announced that he was leaving the show. Formerly he was with NBC and NBCSN, serving as studio host for the 2016 Rio Olympics tennis coverage, NHL playoffs, NASCAR and fantasy football. He is also a former co-host of the Fox News weekend morning show Fox & Friends Weekend. During the December 22, 2012, broadcast of the show, Briggs announced that he was leaving Fox & Friends Weekend at the end of 2012.

== Education ==
Briggs graduated from the University of Colorado at Boulder in 1999 with a degree in broadcast news.

== Career ==
From 2002 to 2004, he was the weekend sports anchor at KOKI-TV Fox 23 in Tulsa, Oklahoma, following which he was a reporter and sports anchor at WHDH (TV), Channel 7, an NBC affiliate in Boston, Massachusetts from 2004 to 2008. He also served as a host and a reporter for Comcast SportsNet New England. In 2008, he joined the Fox News, as co-anchor of Fox & Friends Weekend, alongside Alisyn Camerota and Clayton Morris. Briggs occasionally hosted Fox News' webshow Strategy Room.

In January 2013, Briggs began co-hosting a daily sports and pop culture show for NBCSN called The Crossover with Beadle and Briggs. In May 2013, the show was rebranded as The Crossover with Michelle Beadle, with Beadle as the sole host, and four months later the show was cancelled and Beadle returned to ESPN. Briggs and Carolyn Manno hosted SportsDash weekdays at noon on NBCSN, co-produced by Yahoo Sports with live viewer feedback onscreen.

On February 23, 2017, Briggs began co-hosting CNN's Early Start. Briggs announced on December 20, 2019, that he would be leaving Early Start and CNN.

Later that morning on December 20, 2019, Briggs announced he joined the podcast Home & Home with Ross Tucker on Radio.com. The podcast can also be heard on Apple Podcasts and Spotify.

Briggs also hosted NCAA March Madness Fast Break during the first weekend of the NCAA men's basketball tournament starting in 2021. As of March 2023, he hosts an afternoon show on Yahoo Finance.
