= Live PD season 3 =

Live PD
- Season 3
- Hosted by: Dan Abrams; Tom Morris Jr.; Sean "Sticks" Larkin
- Companion shows: Live PD: Rewind; Live PD: Roll Call
- No. of episodes: 90

Release
- Original network: A&E
- Original release: September 21, 2018 – August 24, 2019

Season chronology
- ← Previous; Season 2 Next → Season 4

The third season of the television series Live PD began airing on September 21, 2018 on A&E. The season concluded on August 24, 2019 and contained 90 episodes.

== Departments returning from season two ==
- Richland County (SC) Sheriff's Department
- Pasco County (FL) Sheriff's Office
- Greene County (MO) Sheriff's Office
- Warwick (RI) Police Department
- Nye County (NV) Sheriff's Office
- El Paso (TX) Police Department
- Mission (TX) Police Department
- Slidell (LA) Police Department

All departments cited from the following sources:

== Department debuting in season three ==
- Salinas (CA) Police Department
- Franklin County (OH) Sheriff's Office
- Williamson County (TX) Sheriff's Office
- Oklahoma Highway Patrol
- Lawrence (IN) Police Department
- U.S. Marshal Service (NY)
- East Providence (RI) Police Department
- Santa Fe (NM) Police Department
- Lafayette (LA) Police Department

All departments cited from the following sources:

=== Notes ===
- Italics indicate a department is not currently featured, but has promised to return later in the season.

== Episodes ==
Season three premiered on September 21, 2018.

No. overall	No. in season	Title	Original release date	U.S. viewers (millions)
144	1	"09.21.18"	September 21, 2018	1.904
Guest analyst: Sgt. Sean "Sticks" Larkin of the Tulsa (OK) Police Department Gang Unit; Departments and officers featured include: El Paso (TX) Police Department (Ofc. Jessica Costa & Ofc. Ramiro Garza), Pasco County (FL) Sheriff's Office (Dep. Skyler Steele & Dep. Nick Carmack with K9 Shep), Richland County (SC) Sheriff's Department (Lt. Danny Brown & Dep. Addy Perez), Greene County (MO) Sheriff's Office (Cpl. Jason Miller & Dep. Kevin Baker), Nye County (NV) Sheriff's Office (Det. Alex Cox & Dep. Josh Bissell), Warwick (RI) Police Department (Sgt. John Curley & Ofc. Aaron Steere with K9 Viking), Mission (TX) Police Department (Ofc. Juan Mercado & Ofc. John Oliva), and Salinas (CA) Police Department (Ofc. Mario Reyes & Ofc. Chayenne Garcia)
145	2	"09.22.18"	September 22, 2018	1.897
Guest analyst: Sgt. Sean "Sticks" Larkin of the Tulsa (OK) Police Department Gang Unit; Departments and officers featured include: El Paso (TX) Police Department (Ofc. Andrea Zendejas & Ofc. Eduardo Lujan), Pasco County (FL) Sheriff's Office (Dep. Chase Pasquotto-Torres & Dep. Nick Carmack with K9 Shep), Richland County (SC) Sheriff's Department (S/D Garo Brown & Dep. Donnyray Campbell), Greene County (MO) Sheriff's Office (Dep. Matthew Weiss & Cpl. Jason Miller), Nye County (NV) Sheriff's Office (Det. Alex Cox & Dep. James Ramos), Warwick (RI) Police Department (Sgt. John Curley & Ofc. Jill Marshall), Mission (TX) Police Department (Ofc. Juan Mercado & Ofc. John Oliva), and Salinas (CA) Police Department (Ofc. Luis Toribio & Ofc. Chayenne Garcia)
146	3	"09.28.18"	September 28, 2018	1.854
Guest analyst: Sgt. Sean "Sticks" Larkin of the Tulsa (OK) Police Department Gang Unit; Departments and officers featured include: El Paso (TX) Police Department (Ofc. Andrea Zendejas & Ofc. Jessica Costa), Pasco County (FL) Sheriff's Office (Dep. Mike Sudler & Cpl. Mike Barrow), Richland County (SC) Sheriff's Department (Dep. Kenny Fitzsimmons & Sgt. James Abraham with K9 Denzel), Greene County (MO) Sheriff's Office (Dep. Danny Wroolie & Dep. Kevin Baker), Nye County (NV) Sheriff's Office (Dep. Josh Bissell & Dep. Jason Yelle), Warwick (RI) Police Department (Ofc. Matt Moretti & Ofc. Paul Wells with K9 Fox), Mission (TX) Police Department (Ofc. Juan Mercado & Ofc. John Oliva), and Salinas (CA) Police Department (Ofc. Mario Reyes & Ofc. Chayenne Garcia)
147	4	"09.29.18"	September 29, 2018	1.858
Guest analyst: Sgt. Sean "Sticks" Larkin of the Tulsa (OK) Police Department Gang Unit; Departments and officers featured include: El Paso (TX) Police Department (Ofc. Andrea Zendejas & Ofc. Eduardo Lujan), Pasco County (FL) Sheriff's Office (Dep. Mike Sudler & Cpl. Mike Barrow), Richland County (SC) Sheriff's Department (Cpl. Mark Laureano & M/D Chris Blanding), Greene County (MO) Sheriff's Office (Dep. Troy Ashley & Dep. Kevin Baker), Nye County (NV) Sheriff's Office (Dep. Josh Bissell & Dep. Michael Connelly), Warwick (RI) Police Department (Sgt. John Curley & Sgt. Jed Pineau), Mission (TX) Police Department (Ofc. Juan Mercado & Ofc. John Oliva), and Salinas (CA) Police Department (Ofc. Robert Durst & Ofc. Chayenne Garcia)
148	5	"10.05.18"	October 5, 2018	1.874
Guest analyst: Sgt. Sean "Sticks" Larkin of the Tulsa (OK) Police Department Gang Unit; Departments and officers featured include: El Paso (TX) Police Department (Ofc. Andrea Zendejas & Ofc. Jessica Costa), Pasco County (FL) Sheriff's Office (Dep. Nick Carmack with K9 Shep & Dep. Mark Pini with K9 Yogi), Richland County (SC) Sheriff's Department (Cpl. Gavin Walmsley with K9 Emy & Cpl. Kristy Boyles), Greene County (MO) Sheriff's Office (Dep. Kyle Winchell & Dep. Kevin Baker), Nye County (NV) Sheriff's Office (Dep. Josh Bissell & Lt. Eric Murphy), Warwick (RI) Police Department (Ofc. Mark Jandreau & Sgt. Jed Pineau), Mission (TX) Police Department (Ofc. Juan Mercado & Ofc. John Oliva), and Salinas (CA) Police Department (Ofc. Robert Durst & Ofc. Michael James Muscutt)
149	6	"10.06.18"	October 6, 2018	1.645
Guest analyst: Sgt. Sean "Sticks" Larkin of the Tulsa (OK) Police Department Gang Unit; Departments and officers featured include: El Paso (TX) Police Department (Ofc. Thomas Sneed & Ofc. Eric Rinker), Pasco County (FL) Sheriff's Office (Dep. Nick Carmack with K9 Shep & Dep. Chris Ramos), Richland County (SC) Sheriff's Department (Dep. Addy Perez & Dep. Jacob Murphy), Greene County (MO) Sheriff's Office (Dep. Natalia Bailey & Dep. Matthew Weiss), Nye County (NV) Sheriff's Office (Dep. Aaron Williamson & Dep. Michael Mokeski), Warwick (RI) Police Department (Ofc. Jill Marshall, Ofc. Aaron Steere with K9 Viking, & Ofc. Jake Elderkin), Mission (TX) Police Department (Ofc. Juan Mercado & Ofc. John Oliva), and Salinas (CA) Police Department (Ofc. Robert Durst & Ofc. Mike Muscutt)
150	7	"10.12.18"	October 12, 2018	1.704
Guest analyst: Sgt. Sean "Sticks" Larkin of the Tulsa (OK) Police Department Gang Unit; Departments and officers featured include: El Paso (TX) Police Department (Ofc. Andrea Zendejas & Ofc. Eric Rinker), Pasco County (FL) Sheriff's Office (Dep. Justin Lawless & Dep. Mike Sentner with K9 Yager), Richland County (SC) Sheriff's Department (M/D Chris Blanding & Sgt. Steven Tapler), Greene County (MO) Sheriff's Office (Sheriff Jim Arnott & Cpl. Tim Haynes), Nye County (NV) Sheriff's Office (Dep. Josh Bissell & Dep. Bryan Cooper), Warwick (RI) Police Department (Ofc. Jill Marshall, Ofc. Aaron Steere with K9 Viking, & Ofc. Mark Jandreau), Mission (TX) Police Department (Ofc. Juan Mercado & Ofc. John Oliva), and Salinas (CA) Police Department (Ofc. Froylan Aranda & Ofc. Mario Avina)
151	8	"10.13.18"	October 13, 2018	1.709
Guest analyst: Sgt. Sean "Sticks" Larkin of the Tulsa (OK) Police Department Gang Unit; Departments and officers featured include: El Paso (TX) Police Department (Ofc. Jessica Costa & Ofc. Eduardo Lujan), Pasco County (FL) Sheriff's Office (Dep. Michael Sudler & Cpl. Mike Barrow), Richland County (SC) Sheriff's Department (Cpl. Mark Laureano & Cpl. Josh Robinson), Greene County (MO) Sheriff's Office (Dep. Matthew Weiss & Dep. Natalia Bailey), Nye County (NV) Sheriff's Office (Lt. Eric Murphy & Dep. Cody Murphy), Warwick (RI) Police Department (Sgt. Jed Pineau & Ofc. Tim Lipka), Mission (TX) Police Department (Ofc. Juan Mercado & Ofc. John Oliva), and Salinas (CA) Police Department (Ofc. Michael Muscutt & Ofc. Chayenne Garcia)
152	9	"10.19.18"	October 19, 2018	1.774
Guest analyst: Sgt. Sean "Sticks" Larkin of the Tulsa (OK) Police Department Gang Unit; Departments and officers featured include: El Paso (TX) Police Department (Ofc. Andrea Zendejas & Ofc. Eduardo Lujan), Pasco County (FL) Sheriff's Office (Dep. Nick Carmack with K9 Shep & Dep. Mark Pini with K9 Yogi), Richland County (SC) Sheriff's Department (Lt. Danny Brown & Sgt. James Abraham with K9 Denzel), Greene County (MO) Sheriff's Office (Cpl. James Craigmyle with K9 Lor, Dep. Danny Wroolie, & Dep. Austin Adams), Nye County (NV) Sheriff's Office (Dep. Jason Yelle & Dep. Bryan Cooper), Warwick (RI) Police Department (Ofc. Jake Elderkin & Ofc. Matt Moretti), Mission (TX) Police Department (Ofc. Juan Mercado & Ofc. John Oliva), and Salinas (CA) Police Department (Ofc. Cameron Mitchell & Ofc. Froylan Aranda)
153	10	"10.20.18"	October 20, 2018	1.725
Guest analyst: Sgt. Sean "Sticks" Larkin of the Tulsa (OK) Police Department Gang Unit; Departments and officers featured include: El Paso (TX) Police Department (Ofc. Jessica Costa & Ofc. Eric Rinker), Pasco County (FL) Sheriff's Office (Dep. Nick Carmack with K9 Shep & Dep. Mark Pini with K9 Yogi), Richland County (SC) Sheriff's Department (Lt. Danny Brown & Dep. Addy Perez), Greene County (MO) Sheriff's Office (Cpl. James Craigmyle with K9 Lor, Dep. Kevin Baker, & Cpl. Jason Flora), Nye County (NV) Sheriff's Office (Lt. Eric Murphy & Dep. Aaron Williamson), Warwick (RI) Police Department (Ofc. Jill Marshall, Ofc. Paul Wells with K9 Fox, & Ofc. Mark Jandreau), Mission (TX) Police Department (Ofc. Juan Mercado & Ofc. John Oliva), and Salinas (CA) Police Department (Ofc. David Crabill & Ofc. Chayenne Garcia)
154	11	"10.26.18"	October 26, 2018	1.725
Guest analyst: Dep. Nick Carmack of the Pasco County (FL) Sheriff's Office with K9 Shep; Departments and officers featured include: El Paso (TX) Police Department (Ofc. Andrea Zendejas & Ofc. Eric Rinker), Pasco County (FL) Sheriff's Office (Dep. Michael Sudler & Cpl. Mike Barrow), Richland County (SC) Sheriff's Department (Cpl. Josh Robinson & Cpl. Kevin Walmsley with K9 Emy), Greene County (MO) Sheriff's Office (Cpl. James Craigmyle with K9 Lor & Dep. Kyle Winchell), Nye County (NV) Sheriff's Office (Dep. Josh Bissell & Dep. Aaron Williamson), Warwick (RI) Police Department (Sgt. Jed Pineau & Ofc. Jake Elderkin), Mission (TX) Police Department (Ofc. Juan Mercado & Ofc. John Oliva), and Salinas (CA) Police Department (Ofc. Robert Hernandez & Ofc. Cameron Mitchell)
155	12	"10.27.18"	October 27, 2018	1.689
Guest analyst: Dep. Nick Carmack of the Pasco County (FL) Sheriff's Office with K9 Shep; Departments and officers featured include: El Paso (TX) Police Department (Ofc. Tony Montenegro & Ofc. Jessica Costa), Pasco County (FL) Sheriff's Office (Cpl. Mitch Bollenbacher & Dep. Justin Lawless), Richland County (SC) Sheriff's Department (S/D Garo Brown & M/D Chris Blanding), Greene County (MO) Sheriff's Office (Dep. Dustin Kendrick with K9 Stark & Dep. Carl Scharpf), Nye County (NV) Sheriff's Office (Lt. Eric Murphy & Dep. Bryan Cooper), Warwick (RI) Police Department (Ofc. Tim Lipka & Ofc. TJ Tavares), Mission (TX) Police Department (Ofc. Juan Mercado & Ofc. John Oliva), and Salinas (CA) Police Department (Ofc. Isidoro Medrano & Ofc. Cameron Mitchell)
156	13	"11.01.18"	November 1, 2018	1.201
Guest analyst: Sgt. Sean "Sticks" Larkin of the Tulsa (OK) Police Department Gang Unit; Departments and officers featured include: El Paso (TX) Police Department (Ofc. Andrea Zendejas & Ofc. Eric Rinker), Pasco County (FL) Sheriff's Office (Cpl. Chris Weaver & Dep. Justin Lawless), Richland County (SC) Sheriff's Department (Cpl. Mark Laureano & Cpl. Josh Robinson), Greene County (MO) Sheriff's Office (Cpl. James Craigmyle with K9 Lor, Dep. Austin Adams, & Dep. Jason Winston), Nye County (NV) Sheriff's Office (Dep. John Powell with K9 Amigo & Dep. Bryan Cooper), Warwick (RI) Police Department (Ofc. Jake Elderkin, Ofc. Aaron Steere with K9 Viking, & Ofc. Matt Moretti), Mission (TX) Police Department (Ofc. Juan Mercado & Ofc. John Oliva), and Salinas (CA) Police Department (Ofc. Froylan Aranda & Ofc. Chayenne Garcia)
157	14	"11.02.18"	November 2, 2018	1.789
Guest analyst: Sgt. Sean "Sticks" Larkin of the Tulsa (OK) Police Department Gang Unit; Departments and officers featured include: El Paso (TX) Police Department (Ofc. Andrea Zendejas & Ofc. Eduardo Lujan), Pasco County (FL) Sheriff's Office (Dep. Thomas Marrero-Bruno & Dep. Nick Carmack with K9 Shep), Richland County (SC) Sheriff's Department (Dep. Jacob Murphy, Dep. Gavin Walmsley with K9 Emy, & Dep. Dave Kopenhaver), Greene County (MO) Sheriff's Office (Dep. Kyle Winchell & Dep. Danny Wroolie), Nye County (NV) Sheriff's Office (Dep. Cody Murphy & Dep. Josh Bissell), Warwick (RI) Police Department (Sgt. John Curley & Ofc. Jill Marshall), Mission (TX) Police Department (Ofc. Juan Mercado & Ofc. John Oliva), and Salinas (CA) Police Department (Ofc. Cameron Mitchell & Ofc. Robert Hernandez)
158	15	"11.03.18"	November 3, 2018	1.795
Guest analyst: Sgt. Sean "Sticks" Larkin of the Tulsa (OK) Police Department Gang Unit; Departments and officers featured include: El Paso (TX) Police Department (Ofc. Eric Rinker & Ofc. Jessica Costa), Pasco County (FL) Sheriff's Office (Dep. Mike Reckmeyer & Dep. Mark Pini with K9 Yogi), Richland County (SC) Sheriff's Department (Lt. Danny Brown & Dep. Addy Perez), Greene County (MO) Sheriff's Office (Dep. Morgan Rudderham & Dep. Carl Scharpf), Nye County (NV) Sheriff's Office (Det. Alex Cox & Lt. James McRae), Warwick (RI) Police Department (Sgt. John Curley & Sgt. Jed Pineau), Mission (TX) Police Department (Ofc. Juan Mercado & Ofc. John Oliva), and Salinas (CA) Police Department (Ofc. Cameron Mitchell & Ofc. Isidoro Medrano)
159	16	"11.09.18"	November 9, 2018	1.777
Guest analyst: Sgt. Sean "Sticks" Larkin of the Tulsa (OK) Police Department Gang Unit; Departments and officers featured include: El Paso (TX) Police Department (Ofc. Andrea Zendejas & Ofc. Eduardo Lujan), Pasco County (FL) Sheriff's Office (Dep. Justin Lawless & Cpl. Mitch Bollenbacher), Richland County (SC) Sheriff's Department (Lt. Danny Brown & S/D Philippe Boss), Greene County (MO) Sheriff's Office (Cpl. James Craigmyle with K9 Lor, Dep. Carl Scharpf, & Lt. Jason Johnson), Nye County (NV) Sheriff's Office (Lt. Eric Murphy & Dep. Aaron Williamson), Warwick (RI) Police Department (Sgt. John Curley & Ofc. Tim Lipka), Mission (TX) Police Department (Ofc. Juan Mercado & Ofc. John Oliva), and Salinas (CA) Police Department (Ofc. Froylan Aranda & Ofc. Mario Reyes)
160	17	"11.10.18"	November 10, 2018	1.894
Guest analyst: Sgt. Sean "Sticks" Larkin of the Tulsa (OK) Police Department Gang Unit; Departments and officers featured include: El Paso (TX) Police Department (Ofc. Jessica Costa & Ofc. Eric Rinker), Pasco County (FL) Sheriff's Office (Dep. Justin Lawless & Cpl. Mitch Bollenbacher), Richland County (SC) Sheriff's Department (Cpl. Mark Laureano & Cpl. David Slemp), Greene County (MO) Sheriff's Office (Cpl. James Craigmyle with K9 Lor & Dep. Kyle Winchell), Nye County (NV) Sheriff's Office (Sgt. Alan Schrimpf & Dep. John Powell with K9 Amigo), Warwick (RI) Police Department (Sgt. John Curley & Ofc. TJ Tavares), Mission (TX) Police Department (Ofc. Juan Mercado & Ofc. John Oliva), and Salinas (CA) Police Department (Ofc. Tyler Provost & Ofc. Mario Reyes)
161	18	"11.16.18"	November 16, 2018	2.034
Guest analyst: Sgt. John Curley of the Warwick (RI) Police Department; Departments and officers featured include: El Paso (TX) Police Department (Ofc. Andrea Zendejas & Ofc. Eric Rinker), Pasco County (FL) Sheriff's Office (Dep. Chase Pasquotto-Torres, Dep. Thomas Marrero-Bruno, & Dep. Mark Pini with K9 Yogi), Richland County (SC) Sheriff's Department (Lt. Danny Brown & Cpl. David Fairbanks), Franklin County (OH) Sheriff's Office (Dep. Zach Cooper, Dep. Josh Crosby, & Dep. Rod Thorne with K9 Diablo), Nye County (NV) Sheriff's Office (Lt. Eric Murphy & Dep. Cody Murphy), Warwick (RI) Police Department (Sgt. Jed Pineau, Ofc. Aaron Steere with K9 Viking, & Ofc. Mark Jandreau), Mission (TX) Police Department (Ofc. Juan Mercado & Ofc. John Oliva), and Salinas (CA) Police Department (Ofc. Alejandro Zamora & Ofc. Mario Reyes)
162	19	"11.17.18"	November 17, 2018	2.021
Guest analyst: Sgt. John Curley of the Warwick (RI) Police Department; Departments and officers featured include: El Paso (TX) Police Department (Ofc. Tony Montenegro & Ofc. Eduardo Lujan), Pasco County (FL) Sheriff's Office (Dep. Thomas Marrero-Bruno & Dep. Mark Pini with K9 Yogi), Richland County (SC) Sheriff's Department (Lt. Danny Brown & Dep. Addy Perez), Franklin County (OH) Sheriff's Office (Dep. Zach Cooper & Dep. Josh Crosby), Nye County (NV) Sheriff's Office (Dep. Aaron Williamson & Dep. John Powell with K9 Amigo), Warwick (RI) Police Department (Ofc. Jill Marshall & Ofc. Jake Elderkin), Mission (TX) Police Department (Ofc. Juan Mercado & Ofc. John Oliva), and Salinas (CA) Police Department (Ofc. Tyler Provost & Ofc. Mario Reyes)
163	20	"11.23.18"	November 23, 2018	1.912
Guest analyst: Sgt. Sean "Sticks" Larkin of the Tulsa (OK) Police Department Gang Unit; Departments and officers featured include: El Paso (TX) Police Department (Ofc. Andrea Zendejas & Ofc. Eduardo Lujan), Pasco County (FL) Sheriff's Office (Dep. Justin Lawless & Cpl. Mitch Bollenbacher), Richland County (SC) Sheriff's Department (M/D Chris Blanding & Cpl. Mark Laureano), Franklin County (OH) Sheriff's Office (Dep. Zach Cooper, Dep. Josh Crosby, & Dep. Rod Thorne with K9 Diablo), Nye County (NV) Sheriff's Office (Dep. Jason Yelle & Dep. Bryan Cooper), Warwick (RI) Police Department (Sgt. John Curley & Ofc. TJ Tavares), Mission (TX) Police Department (Ofc. Juan Mercado & Ofc. John Oliva), and Salinas (CA) Police Department (Ofc. Eduardo Bejarano & Ofc. Mario Reyes)
164	21	"11.24.18"	November 24, 2018	1.900
Guest analyst: Sgt. Sean "Sticks" Larkin of the Tulsa (OK) Police Department Gang Unit; Departments and officers featured include: El Paso (TX) Police Department (Ofc. Andrea Zendejas & Ofc. Eric Rinker), Pasco County (FL) Sheriff's Office (Dep. Justin Lawless & Cpl. Mitch Bollenbacher), Richland County (SC) Sheriff's Department (S/D Jacob Murphy & Dep. Kenny Fitzsimmons), Franklin County (OH) Sheriff's Office (Dep. Zach Cooper & Dep. Josh Crosby), Nye County (NV) Sheriff's Office (Dep. Josh Bissell & Dep. Aaron Williamson), Warwick (RI) Police Department (Ofc. Matt Moretti & Ofc. Jake Elderkin), Mission (TX) Police Department (Ofc. Juan Mercado & Ofc. John Oliva), and Salinas (CA) Police Department (Ofc. Tyler Provost & Ofc. Mario Reyes)
165	22	"11.30.18"	November 30, 2018	1.957
Guest analyst: Sgt. Sean "Sticks" Larkin of the Tulsa (OK) Police Department Gang Unit; Departments and officers featured include: Williamson County (TX) Sheriff's Office (Lt. Grayson Kennedy, Dep. Tabytha Horseman, & Sheriff Robert Chody), Pasco County (FL) Sheriff's Office (Cpl. Mitch Bollenbacher & Dep. Nick Carmack with K9 Shep), Richland County (SC) Sheriff's Department (Lt. Danny Brown, Cpl. Gavin Walmsley with K9 Emy, & Dep. Dave Kopenhaver), Franklin County (OH) Sheriff's Office (Dep. Zach Cooper & Dep. Josh Crosby), Nye County (NV) Sheriff's Office (Sgt. Alan Schrimpf, Det. Alex Cox, & Dep. Josh Bissell), Warwick (RI) Police Department (Sgt. Jed Pineau & Ofc. Mark Jandreau), Mission (TX) Police Department (Ofc. Juan Mercado & Ofc. John Oliva), and Salinas (CA) Police Department (Ofc. Cameron Mitchell & Ofc. Tyler Provost)
166	23	"12.01.18"	December 1, 2018	1.867
Guest analyst: Sgt. Sean "Sticks" Larkin of the Tulsa (OK) Police Department Gang Unit; Departments and officers featured include: Williamson County (TX) Sheriff's Office (Lt. Grayson Kennedy & Dep. Kyle Pence), Pasco County (FL) Sheriff's Office (Dep. Mike Reckmeyer & Dep. Thomas Marrero-Bruno), Richland County (SC) Sheriff's Department (Sgt. Steven Tapler & Dep. Donnyray Campbell), Franklin County (OH) Sheriff's Office (Dep. Zach Cooper & Dep. Josh Crosby), Nye County (NV) Sheriff's Office (Lt. Eric Murphy & Dep. Aaron Williamson), Warwick (RI) Police Department (Ofc. Jill Marshall & Ofc. Aaron Steere with K9 Viking), Mission (TX) Police Department (Ofc. Juan Mercado & Ofc. John Oliva), and Salinas (CA) Police Department (Ofc. Froylan Aranda & Ofc. Robert Durst)
167	24	"12.05.18"	December 5, 2018	1.296
Guest analysts: Sgt. Sean "Sticks" Larkin of the Tulsa (OK) Police Department Gang Unit & Inv. Kevin Lawrence of the Richland County (SC) Sheriff's Department; Departments and officers featured include: Williamson County (TX) Sheriff's Office (Lt. Grayson Kennedy & Dep. Kyle Pence), Pasco County (FL) Sheriff's Office (Cpl. Mitch Bollenbacher & Dep. Nick Carmack with K9 Shep), Richland County (SC) Sheriff's Department (Lt. Danny Brown & S/D Jacob Murphy), Franklin County (OH) Sheriff's Office (Dep. Zach Cooper & Dep. Josh Crosby), Nye County (NV) Sheriff's Office (Det. Alex Cox & Dep. Sedrick Sweet), Warwick (RI) Police Department (Sgt. John Curley & Ofc. Aaron Steere with K9 Viking), Mission (TX) Police Department (Ofc. Juan Mercado & Ofc. John Oliva), and Salinas (CA) Police Department (Ofc. Blake Ziebell & Ofc. Robert Durst)
168	25	"12.07.18"	December 7, 2018	2.101
Guest analyst: Lt. Danny Brown of the Richland County (SC) Sheriff's Department; Departments and officers featured include: Williamson County (TX) Sheriff's Office (Lt. Kelli Bomer, Dep. Kyle Pence, & Dep. Mark Bell with K9 Max), Pasco County (FL) Sheriff's Office (Cpl. Mitch Bollenbacher & Dep. Justin Lawless), Richland County (SC) Sheriff's Department (Cpl. Josh Robinson & M/D Chris Blanding), Franklin County (OH) Sheriff's Office (Dep. Zach Cooper & Dep. Josh Crosby), Nye County (NV) Sheriff's Office (Lt. David Boruchowitz, Lt. Eric Murphy, & Det. Alex Cox), Warwick (RI) Police Department (Ofc. Tim Lipka & Ofc. Jill Marshall), Mission (TX) Police Department (Ofc. Juan Mercado & Ofc. John Oliva), and Salinas (CA) Police Department (Ofc. Cameron Mitchell & Ofc. Robert Hernandez)
169	26	"12.08.18"	December 8, 2018	2.128
Guest analyst: Lt. Danny Brown of the Richland County (SC) Sheriff's Department; Departments and officers featured include: Williamson County (TX) Sheriff's Office (Lt. Kelli Bomer, Dep. Charles Duvall with K9 Kato, & Dep. Mark Bell with K9 Max), Pasco County (FL) Sheriff's Office (Cpl. Mitch Bollenbacher & Dep. Justin Lawless), Richland County (SC) Sheriff's Department (Dep. Addy Perez & Cpl. Mark Laureano), Franklin County (OH) Sheriff's Office (Dep. Zach Cooper & Dep. Josh Crosby), Nye County (NV) Sheriff's Office (Dep. Aaron Williamson & Dep. Bryan Cooper), Warwick (RI) Police Department (Sgt. John Curley & Sgt. Jed Pineau), Mission (TX) Police Department (Ofc. Juan Mercado & Ofc. John Oliva), and Salinas (CA) Police Department (Ofc. Cameron Mitchell & Ofc. Froylan Aranda)
170	27	"12.12.18"	December 12, 2018	1.396
Guest analysts: Sgt. Sean "Sticks" Larkin of the Tulsa (OK) Police Department Gang Unit & Sgt. Denver Leverett with K9 Flex of the Jeffersonville (IN) Police Department; Departments and officers featured include: Williamson County (TX) Sheriff's Office (Lt. Grayson Kennedy, Dep. Roel Alafa, & Sheriff Robert Chody), Pasco County (FL) Sheriff's Office (Dep. Courtland Harrison & Dep. Justin Lawless), Richland County (SC) Sheriff's Department (Cpl. David Slemp & Cpl. Mark Laureano), Franklin County (OH) Sheriff's Office (Dep. Zach Cooper & Dep. Josh Crosby), Nye County (NV) Sheriff's Office (Lt. Eric Murphy & Dep. Cody Murphy), Warwick (RI) Police Department (Ofc. Matt Moretti & Sgt. Jed Pineau), Mission (TX) Police Department (Ofc. Juan Mercado & Ofc. John Oliva), and Salinas (CA) Police Department (Ofc. Robert Durst & Ofc. Froylan Aranda)
171	28	"12.14.18"	December 14, 2018	2.083
Guest analyst: Sgt. Sean "Sticks" Larkin of the Tulsa (OK) Police Department Gang Unit; Departments and officers featured include: Williamson County (TX) Sheriff's Office (Dep. Kyle Pence, Det. Brian Dirner with K9 Nemo, & Dep. Mark Bell with K9 Max), Pasco County (FL) Sheriff's Office (Dep. Tyler Brown & Dep. Nick Carmack with K9 Shep), Richland County (SC) Sheriff's Department (S/D Garo Brown & Dep. Addy Perez), Franklin County (OH) Sheriff's Office (Dep. Zach Cooper & Dep. Josh Crosby), Nye County (NV) Sheriff's Office (Lt. David Boruchowitz & Dep. Josh Bissell), Warwick (RI) Police Department (Ofc. Jill Marshall & Ofc. TJ Tavares), Mission (TX) Police Department (Ofc. Juan Mercado & Ofc. John Oliva), and Salinas (CA) Police Department (Ofc. Cameron Mitchell & Ofc. Katherine Raby)
172	29	"12.15.18"	December 15, 2018	1.878
Guest analyst: Sgt. Sean "Sticks" Larkin of the Tulsa (OK) Police Department Gang Unit; Departments and officers featured include: Williamson County (TX) Sheriff's Office (Lt. Grayson Kennedy & Dep. Jeremy Stewart), Pasco County (FL) Sheriff's Office (Dep. Mark Pini with K9 Yogi & Dep. Nick Carmack with K9 Shep), Richland County (SC) Sheriff's Department (Lt. Danny Brown & Cpl. Gavin Walmsley with K9 Emy), Franklin County (OH) Sheriff's Office (Dep. Zach Cooper & Dep. Josh Crosby), Nye County (NV) Sheriff's Office (Dep. Aaron Williamson & Dep. Sedrick Sweet), Warwick (RI) Police Department (Sgt. John Curley & Ofc. Aaron Steere with K9 Viking), Mission (TX) Police Department (Ofc. Juan Mercado & Ofc. John Oliva), and Salinas (CA) Police Department (Ofc. Tyler Provost & Ofc. Isidoro Medrano)
173	30	"01.03.19"	January 3, 2019	1.651
Guest analyst: Sheriff Mark Lamb of the Pinal County (AZ) Sheriff's Office; Departments and officers featured include: Williamson County (TX) Sheriff's Office (Lt. Grayson Kennedy & Det. Mark Luera), Pasco County (FL) Sheriff's Office (Dep. Mark Pini with K9 Yogi & Dep. Lyndsie Dodd), Richland County (SC) Sheriff's Department (Lt. Danny Brown & Dep. Donnyray Campbell), Franklin County (OH) Sheriff's Office (Dep. Zach Cooper & Dep. Josh Crosby), Nye County (NV) Sheriff's Office (Dep. Jason Yelle & Sgt. Cory Fowles), Warwick (RI) Police Department (Sgt. John Curley & Ofc. Matt Moretti), Mission (TX) Police Department (Ofc. Juan Mercado & Ofc. John Oliva), and Salinas (CA) Police Department (Ofc. Tyler Provost & Ofc. Mike Muscutt)
174	31	"01.04.19"	January 4, 2019	1.869
Guest analyst: Sgt. Sean "Sticks" Larkin of the Tulsa (OK) Police Department Gang Unit; Departments and officers featured include: Williamson County (TX) Sheriff's Office (Lt. Kelli Bomer, Dep. Kyle Pence, & Det. Brian Dirner with K9 Nemo), Pasco County (FL) Sheriff's Office (Dep. Justin Lawless & Dep. Mike Sentner with K9 Yager), Richland County (SC) Sheriff's Department (Cpl. Mark Laureano & Cpl. David Slemp), Franklin County (OH) Sheriff's Office (Dep. Zach Cooper & Dep. Josh Crosby), Nye County (NV) Sheriff's Office (Lt. Eric Murphy & Sgt. Cory Fowles), Warwick (RI) Police Department (Sgt. John Curley, Ofc. Aaron Steere with K9 Viking, & Ofc. Mark Jandreau), Mission (TX) Police Department (Ofc. Juan Mercado & Ofc. John Oliva), and Salinas (CA) Police Department (Ofc. Frank Maldonado & Ofc. Mike Muscutt)
175	32	"01.05.19"	January 5, 2019	1.863
Guest analyst: Sgt. Sean "Sticks" Larkin of the Tulsa (OK) Police Department Gang Unit; Departments and officers featured include: Williamson County (TX) Sheriff's Office (Lt. Grayson Kennedy, Dep. Mark Bell with K9 Max, & Det. Brian Dirner with K9 Nemo), Pasco County (FL) Sheriff's Office (Dep. Justin Lawless & Cpl. Mitch Bollenbacher), Richland County (SC) Sheriff's Department (M/D Chris Blanding & S/D Philippe Boss), Franklin County (OH) Sheriff's Office (Dep. Zach Cooper & Dep. Josh Crosby), Nye County (NV) Sheriff's Office (Sgt. Alan Schrimpf & Sgt. Cory Fowles), Warwick (RI) Police Department (Sgt. Jed Pineau & Ofc. Jill Marshall), Mission (TX) Police Department (Ofc. Juan Mercado & Ofc. John Oliva), and Salinas (CA) Police Department (Ofc. Robert Durst & Ofc. Mike Muscutt)
176	33	"01.11.19"	January 11, 2019	1.959
Guest analyst: Sgt. Sean "Sticks" Larkin of the Tulsa (OK) Police Department Gang Unit; Departments and officers featured include: Williamson County (TX) Sheriff's Office (Lt. Grayson Kennedy, Det. Mark Luera, & Det. Brian Dirner with K9 Nemo), Pasco County (FL) Sheriff's Office (Dep. Mike Reckmeyer & Dep. Nick Carmack with K9 Shep), Richland County (SC) Sheriff's Department (Sgt. Steven Tapler, Cpl. Gavin Walmsley with K9 Emy, & Dep. Dave Kopenhaver), Franklin County (OH) Sheriff's Office (Dep. Zach Cooper & Dep. Josh Crosby), Nye County (NV) Sheriff's Office (Lt. Eric Murphy & Sgt. Cory Fowles), Warwick (RI) Police Department (Ofc. Tim Lipka, Ofc. Aaron Steere with K9 Viking, & Ofc. TJ Tavares), Mission (TX) Police Department (Ofc. Juan Mercado & Ofc. John Oliva), and Salinas (CA) Police Department (Ofc. Tyler Provost & Ofc. Katherine Raby)
177	34	"01.12.19"	January 12, 2019	1.782
Guest analyst: Sgt. Sean "Sticks" Larkin of the Tulsa (OK) Police Department Gang Unit; Departments and officers featured include: Williamson County (TX) Sheriff's Office (Lt. Grayson Kennedy, Dep. David Nickel, & Dep. Charles Duvall with K9 Kato), Pasco County (FL) Sheriff's Office (Dep. Thomas Marrero-Bruno & Dep. Nick Carmack with K9 Shep), Richland County (SC) Sheriff's Department (Dep. Donnyray Campbell & S/D Jacob Murphy), Franklin County (OH) Sheriff's Office (Dep. Zach Cooper & Dep. Josh Crosby), Nye County (NV) Sheriff's Office (Dep. Michael Mokeski & Sgt. Cory Fowles), Warwick (RI) Police Department (Sgt. John Curley & Sgt. Jed Pineau), Mission (TX) Police Department (Ofc. Juan Mercado & Ofc. John Oliva), and Salinas (CA) Police Department (Ofc. Frank Maldonado & Ofc. Mike Muscutt)
178	35	"01.18.19"	January 18, 2019	1.836
Guest analyst: Sgt. Sean "Sticks" Larkin of the Tulsa (OK) Police Department Gang Unit; Departments and officers featured include: Williamson County (TX) Sheriff's Office (Det. Mark Luera & Dep. Mark Bell with K9 Max), Pasco County (FL) Sheriff's Office (Dep. Danielle Kluender & Dep. Mike Sentner with K9 Yager), Richland County (SC) Sheriff's Department (Dep. Addy Perez & M/D Chris Blanding), Franklin County (OH) Sheriff's Office (Dep. Zach Cooper & Dep. Josh Crosby), Nye County (NV) Sheriff's Office (Sgt. Alan Schrimpf & Dep. Cody Murphy), Warwick (RI) Police Department (Ofc. TJ Tavares & Ofc. Aaron Steere with K9 Viking), Mission (TX) Police Department (Ofc. Juan Mercado & Ofc. John Oliva), and Salinas (CA) Police Department (Ofc. Cameron Mitchell & Ofc. Tyler Provost)
179	36	"01.19.19"	January 19, 2019	2.189
Guest analyst: Sgt. Sean "Sticks" Larkin of the Tulsa (OK) Police Department Gang Unit; Departments and officers featured include: Williamson County (TX) Sheriff's Office (Lt. Grayson Kennedy & Dep. Wayne Passailaigue), Pasco County (FL) Sheriff's Office (Dep. Justin Lawless & Dep. Mike Sentner with K9 Yager), Richland County (SC) Sheriff's Department (Cpl. Mark Laureano & S/D Philippe Boss), Franklin County (OH) Sheriff's Office (Dep. Zach Cooper & Sgt. Jeff Valentine with K9 Will), Nye County (NV) Sheriff's Office (Sgt. Alan Schrimpf & Dep. Aaron Williamson), Warwick (RI) Police Department (Sgt. John Curley & Ofc. Jill Marshall), Mission (TX) Police Department (Ofc. Juan Mercado & Ofc. John Oliva), and Salinas (CA) Police Department (Ofc. Mike Muscutt & Ofc. Katherine Raby)
180	37	"01.25.19"	January 25, 2019	1.996
Guest analyst: Sgt. Sean "Sticks" Larkin of the Tulsa (OK) Police Department Gang Unit; Departments and officers featured include: Williamson County (TX) Sheriff's Office (Lt. Grayson Kennedy, Det. Mark Luera, & Sgt. Brian Dirner with K9 Nemo), Pasco County (FL) Sheriff's Office (Cpl. Mitch Bollenbacher, Dep. Nick Carmack with K9 Shep, & Dep. Mark Pini with K9 Yogi), Richland County (SC) Sheriff's Department (S/D Garo Brown, Dep. Donnyray Campbell, & Dep. Daniel Mulcahy), Franklin County (OH) Sheriff's Office (Dep. Zach Cooper & Sgt. Nick Williams), Nye County (NV) Sheriff's Office (Dep. Cody Murphy & Dep. Jason Yelle), Warwick (RI) Police Department (Sgt. Jed Pineau & Ofc. Jill Marshall), Mission (TX) Police Department (Ofc. Juan Mercado & Ofc. John Oliva), and Salinas (CA) Police Department (Ofc. Cameron Mitchell & Ofc. Isidoro Medrano)
181	38	"01.26.19"	January 26, 2019	2.106
Guest analyst: Sgt. Sean "Sticks" Larkin of the Tulsa (OK) Police Department Gang Unit; Departments and officers featured include: Williamson County (TX) Sheriff's Office (Lt. Grayson Kennedy & Dep. Kyle Pence), Pasco County (FL) Sheriff's Office (Dep. Thomas Marrero-Bruno & Dep. Nick Carmack with K9 Shep), Richland County (SC) Sheriff's Department (Lt. Danny Brown & Dep. Addy Perez), Franklin County (OH) Sheriff's Office (Sgt. Jeff Valentine with K9 Will & Sgt. Nick Williams), Nye County (NV) Sheriff's Office (Lt. Eric Murphy & Dep. Sedrick Sweet), Warwick (RI) Police Department (Ofc. Jake Elderkin & Ofc. Mark Jandreau), Mission (TX) Police Department (Ofc. Juan Mercado & Ofc. John Oliva), and Salinas (CA) Police Department (Ofc. Cameron Mitchell & Ofc. Froylan Aranda)
182	39	"02.01.19"	February 1, 2019	1.922
Guest analyst: Sgt. Sean "Sticks" Larkin of the Tulsa (OK) Police Department Gang Unit; Departments and officers featured include: Williamson County (TX) Sheriff's Office (Lt. Grayson Kennedy & Det. Mark Luera), Pasco County (FL) Sheriff's Office (Dep. Danielle Kluender & Dep. Justin Lawless), Richland County (SC) Sheriff's Department (Cpl. Josh Robinson & Cpl. Gavin Walmsley with K9 Emy), Franklin County (OH) Sheriff's Office (Sgt. Jeff Valentine with K9 Will & Sgt. Nick Williams), Nye County (NV) Sheriff's Office (Sgt. Alan Schrimpf & Dep. Sedrick Sweet), Warwick (RI) Police Department (Ofc. TJ Tavares & Ofc. Aaron Steere with K9 Viking), Mission (TX) Police Department (Ofc. Juan Mercado & Ofc. John Oliva), and Salinas (CA) Police Department (Ofc. Cameron Mitchell & Ofc. Froylan Aranda)
183	40	"02.02.19"	February 2, 2019	2.316
Guest analyst: Sgt. Sean "Sticks" Larkin of the Tulsa (OK) Police Department Gang Unit; Departments and officers featured include: Williamson County (TX) Sheriff's Office (Lt. Grayson Kennedy & Dep. David Nickel), Pasco County (FL) Sheriff's Office (Dep. Justin Lawless & Dep. Mike Sentener with K9 Yager), Richland County (SC) Sheriff's Department (Cpl. Mark Laureano & Cpl. David Slemp), Franklin County (OH) Sheriff's Office (Sgt. Jeff Valentine with K9 Will & Sgt. Nick Williams), Nye County (NV) Sheriff's Office (Lt. David Boruchowitz & Dep. Bryan Cooper), Warwick (RI) Police Department (Sgt. Jed Pineau & Sgt. John Curley), Mission (TX) Police Department (Ofc. Juan Mercado & Ofc. John Oliva), and Salinas (CA) Police Department (Ofc. Robert Durst & Ofc. Froylan Aranda)
184	41	"02.08.19"	February 8, 2019	1.971
Guest analysts: Ofc. Juan Mercado & Ofc. John Oliva of the Mission (TX) Police Department; Departments and officers featured include: Williamson County (TX) Sheriff's Office (Lt. Grayson Kennedy & Det. Mark Luera), Pasco County (FL) Sheriff's Office (Cpl. Mitch Bollenbacher & Dep. Nick Carmack with K9 Shep), Richland County (SC) Sheriff's Department (Sgt. Steven Tapler & S/D Jacob Murphy), Franklin County (OH) Sheriff's Office (Sgt. Jeff Valentine with K9 Will & Sgt. Nick Williams), Nye County (NV) Sheriff's Office (Lt. Eric Murphy & Dep. Jason Yelle), Warwick (RI) Police Department (Ofc. Matt Moretti & Ofc. Aaron Steere with K9 Viking), Slidell (LA) Police Department (Ofc. Jake Morris with K9 Kano & Ofc. Clint McCall with K9 Quest), and Salinas (CA) Police Department (Ofc. Robert Durst & Ofc. Mike Muscutt)
185	42	"02.09.19"	February 9, 2019	2.158
Guest analysts: Ofc. Juan Mercado & Ofc. John Oliva of the Mission (TX) Police Department; Departments and officers featured include: Williamson County (TX) Sheriff's Office (Lt. Grayson Kennedy & Dep. Charles Duvall with K9 Kato), Pasco County (FL) Sheriff's Office (Dep. Mike Reckmeyer & Dep. Nick Carmack with K9 Shep), Richland County (SC) Sheriff's Department (Lt. Danny Brown & Dep. Addy Perez), Franklin County (OH) Sheriff's Office (Sgt. Jeff Valentine with K9 Will & Sgt. Nick Williams), Nye County (NV) Sheriff's Office (Dep. Michael Mokeski & Dep. Sedrick Sweet), Warwick (RI) Police Department (Ofc. Tim Lipka & Ofc. Mark Jandreau), Slidell (LA) Police Department (Ofc. Jake Morris with K9 Kano & Ofc. Clint McCall with K9 Quest), and Salinas (CA) Police Department (Ofc. Cameron Mitchell & Ofc. Mike Muscutt)
186	43	"02.15.19"	February 15, 2019	1.860
Guest analyst: Sgt. Sean "Sticks" Larkin of the Tulsa (OK) Police Department Gang Unit; Departments and officers featured include: Williamson County (TX) Sheriff's Office (Lt. Grayson Kennedy & Det. Mark Luera), Pasco County (FL) Sheriff's Office (Dep. Michael Sudler & Dep. Mike Sentner), Richland County (SC) Sheriff's Department (S/D Garo Brown & Dep. Donnyray Campbell), Franklin County (OH) Sheriff's Office (Dep. Zach Cooper & Sgt. Nick Williams), Nye County (NV) Sheriff's Office (Sgt. Alan Schrimpf & Dep. Bryan Cooper), Warwick (RI) Police Department (Ofc. Jill Marshall & Ofc. Jake Elderkin), Slidell (LA) Police Department (Ofc. Jake Morris with K9 Kano & Ofc. Brad Peck), and Salinas (CA) Police Department (Ofc. Evan Adams & Ofc. Mike Muscutt)
187	44	"02.16.19"	February 16, 2019	2.084
Guest analyst: Sgt. Sean "Sticks" Larkin of the Tulsa (OK) Police Department Gang Unit; Departments and officers featured include: Williamson County (TX) Sheriff's Office (Lt. Grayson Kennedy & Dep. Kyle Pence), Pasco County (FL) Sheriff's Office (Dep. Michael Sudler & Dep. Justin Lawless), Richland County (SC) Sheriff's Department (Cpl. Josh Robinson & S/D Philippe Boss), Franklin County (OH) Sheriff's Office (Sgt. Jeff Valentine with K9 Will & Sgt. Nick Williams), Nye County (NV) Sheriff's Office (Sgt. Alan Schrimpf & Sgt. Cory Fowles), Warwick (RI) Police Department (Sgt. John Curley & Ofc. TJ Tavares), Slidell (LA) Police Department (Ofc. Jake Morris with K9 Kano & Ofc. Brad Peck), and Salinas (CA) Police Department (Ofc. Isidoro Medrano & Ofc. Mike Muscutt)
188	45	"02.22.19"	February 22, 2019	1.963
Guest analyst: Sgt. Sean "Sticks" Larkin of the Tulsa (OK) Police Department Gang Unit; Departments and officers featured include: Williamson County (TX) Sheriff's Office (Lt. Grayson Kennedy & Det. Mark Luera), Pasco County (FL) Sheriff's Office (Dep. Mike Reckmeyer & Dep. Nick Carmack with K9 Shep), Richland County (SC) Sheriff's Department (Cpl. Gavin Walmsley with K9 Emy & Cpl. David Fairbanks), Franklin County (OH) Sheriff's Office (Sgt. Jeff Valentine with K9 Will & Sgt. Nick Williams), Nye County (NV) Sheriff's Office (Lt. Eric Murphy & Dep. Jason Yelle), Warwick (RI) Police Department (Ofc. Jill Marshall & Ofc. Aaron Steere with K9 Viking), Slidell (LA) Police Department (Ofc. Jake Morris with K9 Kano & Ofc. Clint McCall with K9 Quest), and Salinas (CA) Police Department (Ofc. Evan Adams & Ofc. Mike Muscutt)
189	46	"02.23.19"	February 23, 2019	2.058
Guest analyst: Sgt. Sean "Sticks" Larkin of the Tulsa (OK) Police Department Gang Unit; Departments and officers featured include: Williamson County (TX) Sheriff's Office (Lt. Grayson Kennedy & Det. Mark Luera), Pasco County (FL) Sheriff's Office (Cpl. Mitch Bollenbacher & Dep. Nick Carmack with K9 Shep), Richland County (SC) Sheriff's Department (Dep. Donnyray Campbell & Dep. Brandon Simmons), Franklin County (OH) Sheriff's Office (Sgt. Jeff Valentine with K9 Will & Sgt. Nick Williams), Nye County (NV) Sheriff's Office (Sgt. Cory Fowles & Dep. Sedrick Sweet), Warwick (RI) Police Department (Sgt. John Curley & Ofc. Aaron Steere with K9 Viking), Slidell (LA) Police Department (Ofc. Jake Morris with K9 Kano & Ofc. Clint McCall with K9 Quest), and Salinas (CA) Police Department (Ofc. Evan Adams & Ofc. Mike Muscutt)
190	47	"03.01.19"	March 1, 2019	1.887
Guest analyst: Sgt. Sean "Sticks" Larkin of the Tulsa (OK) Police Department Gang Unit; Departments and officers featured include: Williamson County (TX) Sheriff's Office (Lt. Grayson Kennedy & Det. Mark Luera), Pasco County (FL) Sheriff's Office (Dep. Michael Sudler & Cpl. Mike Barrow), Richland County (SC) Sheriff's Department (Cpl. David Slemp & Dep. Kenny Fitzsimmons), Franklin County (OH) Sheriff's Office (Sgt. Jeff Valentine with K9 Will & Sgt. Nick Williams), Nye County (NV) Sheriff's Office (Sgt. Alan Schrimpf & Lt. James McRae), Warwick (RI) Police Department (Sgt. Jed Pineau & Ofc. Tim Lipka), Slidell (LA) Police Department (Ofc. Brad Peck & Ofc. Clint McCall with K9 Quest), and Salinas (CA) Police Department (Ofc. Seth Morton & Ofc. Zachary Dunagan)
191	48	"03.02.19"	March 2, 2019	2.075
Guest analyst: Sgt. Sean "Sticks" Larkin of the Tulsa (OK) Police Department Gang Unit; Departments and officers featured include: Williamson County (TX) Sheriff's Office (Det. Mark Luera & Dep. Mark Bell with K9 Max), Pasco County (FL) Sheriff's Office (Dep. Mike Sentner with K9 Yager & Dep. Justin Lawless), Richland County (SC) Sheriff's Department (M/D Chris Blanding & Cpl. Josh Robinson), Franklin County (OH) Sheriff's Office (Sgt. Jeff Valentine with K9 Will & Sgt. Nick Williams), Nye County (NV) Sheriff's Office (Dep. Aaron Williamson & Dep. Bryan Cooper), Warwick (RI) Police Department (Ofc. Mark Jandreau & Ofc. Jake Elderkin), Slidell (LA) Police Department (Ofc. Brad Peck & Ofc. Clint McCall with K9 Quest), and Salinas (CA) Police Department (Ofc. Seth Morton & Ofc. Tyler Provost)
192	49	"03.08.19"	March 8, 2019	1.939
Guest analyst: Sgt. Sean "Sticks" Larkin of the Tulsa (OK) Police Department Gang Unit; Departments and officers featured include: Williamson County (TX) Sheriff's Office (Lt. Grayson Kennedy & Det. Mark Luera), Pasco County (FL) Sheriff's Office (Dep. Mike Reckmeyer & Dep. Mark Pini with K9 Yogi), Richland County (SC) Sheriff's Department (Sgt. Steven Tapler & Cpl. Gavin Walmsley with K9 Emy), Franklin County (OH) Sheriff's Office (Dep. Zach Cooper & Dep. William Castle), Nye County (NV) Sheriff's Office (Lt. Eric Murphy & Lt. David Boruchowitz), Warwick (RI) Police Department (Ofc. Jill Marshall & Ofc. TJ Tavares), Slidell (LA) Police Department (Ofc. Jake Morris with K9 Kano & Ofc. Brad Peck), and Salinas (CA) Police Department (Ofc. Evan Adams & Ofc. Mario Reyes)
193	50	"03.09.19"	March 9, 2019	1.887
Guest analyst: Sgt. Sean "Sticks" Larkin of the Tulsa (OK) Police Department Gang Unit; Departments and officers featured include: Williamson County (TX) Sheriff's Office (Dep. Derek Garretson & Dep. Charles Duvall with K9 Kato), Pasco County (FL) Sheriff's Office (Cpl. Mitch Bollenbacher & Dep. Nick Carmack with K9 Shep), Richland County (SC) Sheriff's Department (Dep. Donnyray Campbell & Cpl. Kristy Boyles), Franklin County (OH) Sheriff's Office (Sgt. Nick Williams & Dep. William Castle), Nye County (NV) Sheriff's Office (Lt. James McRae & Dep. John Powell with K9 Amigo), Warwick (RI) Police Department (Sgt. John Curley & Ofc. Aaron Steere with K9 Viking), Slidell (LA) Police Department (Ofc. Jake Morris with K9 Kano & Ofc. Brad Peck), and Salinas (CA) Police Department (Ofc. Mike Muscutt & Ofc. Seth Morton)
194	51	"03.29.19"	March 29, 2019	1.998
Guest analyst: Sgt. Sean "Sticks" Larkin of the Tulsa (OK) Police Department Gang Unit; Departments and officers featured include: Williamson County (TX) Sheriff's Office (Lt. Grayson Kennedy & Det. Mark Luera), Richland County (SC) Sheriff's Department (Lt. Danny Brown & Cpl. Gavin Walmsley with K9 Emy), Franklin County (OH) Sheriff's Office (Sgt. Nick Williams & Dep. James McCoy & K9 Riddick), Warwick (RI) Police Department (Ofc. Tim Lipka & Ofc. Aaron Steere with K9 Viking), Slidell (LA) Police Department (Ofc. Jake Morris with K9 Kano & Ofc. Clint McCall with K9 Quest), Salinas (CA) Police Department (Ofc. Mike Muscutt & Ofc. Robert Durst), Oklahoma Highway Patrol (Tpr. Mystal Perkins & Tpr. Chris Bunch), and Greene County (MO) Sheriff's Office (Dep. Kyle Winchell & Dep. Matt Weiss).
195	52	"03.30.19"	March 30, 2019	1.949
Guest analyst: Sgt. Sean "Sticks" Larkin of the Tulsa (OK) Police Department Gang Unit; Departments and officers featured include: Williamson County (TX) Sheriff's Office (Lt. Grayson Kennedy & Det. Mark Luera), Richland County (SC) Sheriff's Department (Cpl. Mark Laureano & M/D Chris Blanding), Franklin County (OH) Sheriff's Office (Sgt. Nick Williams & Dep. James McCoy & K9 Riddick), Warwick (RI) Police Department (Ofc. Jill Marshall & Ofc. Matt Moretti), Slidell (LA) Police Department (Ofc. Jake Morris with K9 Kano & Ofc. Clint McCall with K9 Quest), Salinas (CA) Police Department (Ofc. Mike Muscutt & Ofc. Tyler Provost), Oklahoma Highway Patrol (Tpr. Chris Bunch & Tpr. Ryan Smith), and Greene County (MO) Sheriff's Office (Dep. Kyle Winchell & Dep. Matt Weiss).
196	53	"04.05.19"	April 5, 2019	2.068
Guest analysts: Officers Jake Morris and Clint McCall, PIO Detective Daniel Seuzeneau, and Chief Randy Fandal of the Slidell (LA) Police Department; Departments and officers featured include: Williamson County (TX) Sheriff's Office (Lt. Grayson Kennedy & Det. Mark Luera), Richland County (SC) Sheriff's Department (Sgt. Steven Tapler & Dep. Brandon Simmons), Franklin County (OH) Sheriff's Office (Dep. Josh Crosby & Dep. James McCoy & K9 Riddick), Warwick (RI) Police Department (Ofc. Jill Marshall & Ofc. TJ Tavares), Slidell (LA) Police Department (Ofc. Brad Peck & Ofc. Cyle Laferrara), Salinas (CA) Police Department (Ofc. Mike Muscutt & Ofc. Tyler Provost), Oklahoma Highway Patrol (Tpr. Micah Freeman & Tpr. Ryan Smith), and Greene County (MO) Sheriff's Office (Dep. Kyle Winchell & Dep. Morgan Rudderham with K9 Athos).
197	54	"04.06.19"	April 6, 2019	1.950
Guest analysts: Officers Jake Morris and Clint McCall, PIO Detective Daniel Seuzeneau, and Chief Randy Fandal of the Slidell (LA) Police Department; Departments and officers featured include: Williamson County (TX) Sheriff's Office (Lt. Grayson Kennedy & Dep. Derek Garretson), Richland County (SC) Sheriff's Department (S/D Garo Brown & Dep. Donnyray Campbell), Franklin County (OH) Sheriff's Office (Dep. Kent Romine & Sgt. Nick Williams), Warwick (RI) Police Department (Ofc. Jake Elderkin & Ofc. Mark Jandreau), Slidell (LA) Police Department (Ofc. Brad Peck & Ofc. Cyle Laferrara), Salinas (CA) Police Department (Ofc. Cameron Mitchell & Ofc. Isidoro Medrano), Oklahoma Highway Patrol (Tpr. Chris Bunch & Tpr. Mystal Perkins), and Greene County (MO) Sheriff's Office (Dep. Kyle Winchell & Dep. Paige Rippee).
198	55	"04.12.19"	April 12, 2019	1.819
Guest analyst: Senior Deputy Garo Brown of the Richland County (SC) Sheriff's Department; Departments and officers featured include: Williamson County (TX) Sheriff's Office (Det. Mark Luera & Dep. Kyle Pence), Richland County (SC) Sheriff's Department (Lt. Danny Brown & Dep. Kenny Fitzsimmons), Franklin County (OH) Sheriff's Office (Dep. Josh Crosby & Sgt. Nick Williams), Warwick (RI) Police Department (Ofc. Matt Moretti & Ofc. Jake Elderkin), Slidell (LA) Police Department (Jake Morris with K9 Kano & Ofc. Clint McCall with K9 Quest), Salinas (CA) Police Department (Ofc. Mike Muscutt & Ofc. Tyler Provost), Oklahoma Highway Patrol (Tpr. Sarah Rencken & Tpr. Russell Callicoat), and Greene County (MO) Sheriff's Office (Dep. Kyle Winchell & Cpl. Jason Flora).
199	56	"04.13.19"	April 13, 2019	1.984
Guest analyst: Senior Deputy Garo Brown of the Richland County (SC) Sheriff's Department; Departments and officers featured include: Williamson County (TX) Sheriff's Office (Lt. Grayson Kennedy & Det. Mark Luera), Richland County (SC) Sheriff's Department (Investigator Kevin Lawrence & Investigator Chris Mastrianni), Franklin County (OH) Sheriff's Office (Sgt. Nick Williams & Dep. Robert McKee with K9 Gator), Warwick (RI) Police Department (Ofc. TJ Tavares & Ofc. Aaron Steere with K9 Viking), Slidell (LA) Police Department (Jake Morris with K9 Kano & Ofc. Clint McCall with K9 Quest), Salinas (CA) Police Department (Ofc. Mike Muscutt & Ofc. Eduardo Bejarano), Oklahoma Highway Patrol (Tpr. Russell Callicoat & Tpr. Sarah Rencken), and Greene County (MO) Sheriff's Office (Dep. Kyle Winchell & Dep. Carl Scharpf).
200	57	"04.19.19"	April 19, 2019	2.123
Guest analyst: Sgt. Sean "Sticks" Larkin of the Tulsa (OK) Police Department Gang Unit; Departments and officers featured include: Williamson County (TX) Sheriff's Office (Lt. Grayson Kennedy & Det. Mark Luera), Richland County (SC) Sheriff's Department (Dep. Donnyray Campbell & Brandon Simmons), Franklin County (OH) Sheriff's Office (Dep. Josh Crosby & Dep. William Castle), Warwick (RI) Police Department (Ofc. TJ Tavares & Ofc. Aaron Steere with K9 Viking), Salinas (CA) Police Department (Ofc. Mike Muscutt & Ofc. Evan Adams), Oklahoma Highway Patrol (Tpr. Chris Bunch & Tpr. Ryan Smith), Greene County (MO) Sheriff's Office (Dep. Kyle Winchell & Dep. Matt Weiss), and Lawrence (IN) Police Department (Ofc. Stuart Bishop & Ofc. Charlie Kingery).
201	58	"04.20.19"	April 20, 2019	2.163
Guest analyst: Sgt. Sean "Sticks" Larkin of the Tulsa (OK) Police Department Gang Unit; Departments and officers featured include: Williamson County (TX) Sheriff's Office (Dep. Kyle Pence & Dep. Charles Duvall with K9 Kato), Richland County (SC) Sheriff's Department (Sgt. Steven Tapler & M/D Jacob Murphy), Franklin County (OH) Sheriff's Office (Dep. Kent Romine & Dep. Robert McKee with K9 Gator), Warwick (RI) Police Department (Sgt. John Curley & Ofc. Jill Marshall), Salinas (CA) Police Department (Ofc. Mike Muscutt & Ofc. Evan Adams), Oklahoma Highway Patrol (Tpr. Leonardo Flores & Tpr. Mystal Perkins), Greene County (MO) Sheriff's Office (Dep. Paige Rippee & Dep. Carl Scharpf), and Lawrence (IN) Police Department (Ofc. Stuart Bishop & Ofc. Charlie Kingery).
202	59	"04.26.19"	April 26, 2019	1.886
Guest host: Ashleigh Banfield (Replacing Dan Abrams); Guest analyst: Sgt. Sean "Sticks" Larkin of the Tulsa (OK) Police Department Gang Unit; Departments and officers featured include: Williamson County (TX) Sheriff's Office (Lt. Grayson Kennedy & Det. Mark Luera), Richland County (SC) Sheriff's Department (Dep. Donnyray Campbell & Brandon Simmons), Franklin County (OH) Sheriff's Office (Dep. Josh Crosby & Dep. William Castle), Warwick (RI) Police Department (Ofc. TJ Tavares & Ofc. Aaron Steere with K9 Viking), Salinas (CA) Police Department (Ofc. Mike Muscutt & Ofc. Evan Adams), Oklahoma Highway Patrol (Tpr. Chris Bunch & Tpr. Ryan Smith), Greene County (MO) Sheriff's Office (Dep. Kyle Winchell & Dep. Matt Weiss), and Lawrence (IN) Police Department (Ofc. Stuart Bishop & Ofc. Charlie Kingery).
203	60	"04.27.19"	April 27, 2019	2.022
Guest analyst: Sgt. Sean "Sticks" Larkin of the Tulsa (OK) Police Department Gang Unit; Departments and officers featured include: Williamson County (TX) Sheriff's Office (Det. Mark Luera & Dep. David Nickel), Richland County (SC) Sheriff's Department (M/D Philippe Boss & M/D Chris Blanding), Franklin County (OH) Sheriff's Office (Dep. Kent Romine & Dep. Robert McKee with K9 Gator), Warwick (RI) Police Department (Sgt. John Curley & Ofc. Aaron Steere with K9 Garry), Salinas (CA) Police Department (Ofc. Seth Morton & Ofc. Tyler Provost), Oklahoma Highway Patrol (Tpr. Leonardo Flores & Tpr. Cliff Kinsler), Greene County (MO) Sheriff's Office (Dep. Kyle Winchell & Dep. Matt Weiss), and Lawrence (IN) Police Department (Ofc. Adam Hazelwood with K9 Chedo & Ofc. Corey Whaley).
204	61	"05.01.19"	May 1, 2019	1.146
Guest analyst: Sgt. Sean "Sticks" Larkin of the Tulsa (OK) Police Department Gang Unit; Departments and officers featured include: Williamson County (TX) Sheriff's Office (Lt. Grayson Kennedy & Det. Mark Luera), Richland County (SC) Sheriff's Department (Cpl. Mark Laureano & M/D Chris Blanding), Franklin County (OH) Sheriff's Office (Dep. Josh Crosby & Dep. Robert McKee with K9 Gator), Warwick (RI) Police Department (Ofc. Tim Lipka & Ofc. Aaron Steere with K9 Garry), Salinas (CA) Police Department (Ofc. Froylan Aranda & Ofc. Evan Adams), Oklahoma Highway Patrol (Tpr. Mystal Perkins & Tpr. Ryan Smith), Greene County (MO) Sheriff's Office (Dep. Kyle Winchell & Dep. Jason Flora), and Lawrence (IN) Police Department (Ofc. Devin Randle & Ofc. Steven Rech).
205	62	"05.03.19"	May 3, 2019	1.875
Guest analyst: Sgt. Sean "Sticks" Larkin of the Tulsa (OK) Police Department Gang Unit; Departments and officers featured include: Williamson County (TX) Sheriff's Office (Lt. Grayson Kennedy & Det. Mark Luera), Richland County (SC) Sheriff's Department (Lt. Danny Brown & Cpl. Kristy Boyles), Franklin County (OH) Sheriff's Office (Dep. Josh Crosby & Dep. Kent Romine), Warwick (RI) Police Department (Ofc. TJ Tavares & Ofc. Matt Moretti), Salinas (CA) Police Department (Ofc. Cameron Mitchell & Ofc. Isidoro Medrano), Oklahoma Highway Patrol (Tpr. Jeff Laue & Tpr. Quenton Payne), Greene County (MO) Sheriff's Office (Dep. Kyle Winchell & Dep. Morgan Rudderham with K9 Athos), and Lawrence (IN) Police Department (Ofc. Stuart Bishop & Ofc. Devin Randle).
206	63	"05.04.19"	May 4, 2019	2.110
Guest analyst: Sgt. Sean "Sticks" Larkin of the Tulsa (OK) Police Department Gang Unit; Departments and officers featured include: Williamson County (TX) Sheriff's Office (Dep. James Johnson & Dep. Charles Duvall with K9 Kato), Richland County (SC) Sheriff's Department (Dep. Donnyray Campbell & Dep. Daniel Mulcahy), Franklin County (OH) Sheriff's Office (Sgt. Nick Williams & Dep. Robert McKee with K9 Gator), Warwick (RI) Police Department (Ofc. Jake Elderkin & Ofc. Mark Jandreau), Salinas (CA) Police Department (Ofc. Cameron Mitchell & Ofc. Evan Adams), Oklahoma Highway Patrol (Tpr. Jeff Laue & Tpr. Russell Callicoat), Greene County (MO) Sheriff's Office (Dep. Paige Rippee & Dep. Carl Scharpf), and Lawrence (IN) Police Department (Ofc. Stuart Bishop & Ofc. Devin Randle).
207	64	"05.10.19"	May 10, 2019	1.906
Guest analyst: Sgt. Sean "Sticks" Larkin of the Tulsa (OK) Police Department Gang Unit; Departments and officers featured include: Williamson County (TX) Sheriff's Office (Det. Mark Luera & Dep. Charles Duvall with K9 Kato), Richland County (SC) Sheriff's Department (S/D Garo Brown & Cpl. Kristy Boyles), Franklin County (OH) Sheriff's Office (Dep. Josh Crosby & Dep. Robert McKee with K9 Gator), Warwick (RI) Police Department (Ofc. Jake Elderkin & Ofc. Jill Marshall), Salinas (CA) Police Department (Ofc. Cameron Mitchell & Ofc. Isidoro Medrano), Oklahoma Highway Patrol (Tpr. Micah Freeman & Tpr. Mystal Perkins), Greene County (MO) Sheriff's Office (Dep. Jason Flora & Dep. Morgan Rudderham with K9 Athos), and Lawrence (IN) Police Department (Ofc. Devin Randle & Ofc. Derek Byerly).
208	65	"05.11.19"	May 11, 2019	2.078
Guest analyst: Sgt. Sean "Sticks" Larkin of the Tulsa (OK) Police Department Gang Unit; Departments and officers featured include: Williamson County (TX) Sheriff's Office (Det. Mark Luera & Dep. Charles Duvall with K9 Kato), Richland County (SC) Sheriff's Department (Cpl. Mark Laureano & Dep. Kenneth Fitzsimmons), Franklin County (OH) Sheriff's Office (Sgt. Nick Williams & Dep. Robert McKee with K9 Gator), Warwick (RI) Police Department (Ofc. Aaron Steere with K9 Garry & Ofc. Jill Marshall), Salinas (CA) Police Department (Ofc. Cameron Mitchell & Ofc. Froylan Aranda), Oklahoma Highway Patrol (Tpr. Leonardo Flores & Tpr. Micah Freeman), Greene County (MO) Sheriff's Office (Dep. Paige Rippee & Dep. Kyle Winchell), and Lawrence (IN) Police Department (Ofc. Devin Randle & Ofc. Derek Byerly).
209	66	"05.31.19"	May 31, 2019	2.086
Guest analyst: Ofc. Jill Marshall of the Warwick (RI) Police Department; Departments and officers featured include: Williamson County (TX) Sheriff's Office (Lt. Grayson Kennedy & Det. Mark Luera), Richland County (SC) Sheriff's Department (Dep. Donnyray Campbell & Dep. Daniel Mulcahy), Santa Fe (NM) Police Department (Ofc. Dianna Conklin & Ofc. Josh Ramirez), East Providence (RI) Police Department (Sgt. Michael Rapoza & Ofc. Ryan Cute), Salinas (CA) Police Department (Ofc. Mike Muscutt & Ofc. Tyler Provost), Oklahoma Highway Patrol (Tpr. Ryan Smith & Tpr. Micah Freeman), Greene County (MO) Sheriff's Office (Dep. Jason Flora & Dep. Morgan Rudderham with K9 Athos), and Lawrence (IN) Police Department (Ofc. Devin Randle & Ofc. Charlie Kingery).
210	67	"06.01.19"	June 1, 2019	2.140
Guest analyst: Ofc. Jill Marshall of the Warwick (RI) Police Department; Departments and officers featured include: Williamson County (TX) Sheriff's Office (Lt. Grayson Kennedy & Dep. Charles Duvall with K9 Kato), Richland County (SC) Sheriff's Department (S/D Garo Brown & Dep. Brandon Simmons), Santa Fe (NM) Police Department (Ofc. Andrew Laur & Ofc. Anthony Madrid), East Providence (RI) Police Department (Cpl. David Silva & Insp. Craig Sroka), Salinas (CA) Police Department (Ofc. Mike Muscutt & Ofc. Katherine Raby), Oklahoma Highway Patrol (Tpr. Mystal Perkins & Tpr. Micah Freeman), Greene County (MO) Sheriff's Office (Dep. Kyle Winchell & Dep. Morgan Rudderham with K9 Athos), and Lawrence (IN) Police Department (Ofc. Devin Randle & Ofc. Charlie Kingery).
211	68	"06.07.19"	June 7, 2019	1.773
Guest analyst: Sgt. Sean "Sticks" Larkin of the Tulsa (OK) Police Department Gang Unit; Departments and officers featured include: Williamson County (TX) Sheriff's Office (Lt. Grayson Kennedy & Det. Mark Luera), Richland County (SC) Sheriff's Department (Dep. Daniel Mulcahy & Cpl. Kristy Boyles), Santa Fe (NM) Police Department (Ofc. Charles Laramie & Ofc. Josh Ramirez), East Providence (RI) Police Department (Sgt. Michael Rapoza & Ofc. Jacob Mount), Salinas (CA) Police Department (Ofc. Mike Muscutt & Ofc. Evan Adams), Oklahoma Highway Patrol (Tpr. Aaron Nickell & Tpr. Eric Foster), Greene County (MO) Sheriff's Office (Dep. Kyle Winchell & Dep. Morgan Rudderham with K9 Athos), and Lawrence (IN) Police Department (Ofc. Devin Randle & Ofc. Jason Heiney).
212	69	"06.08.19"	June 8, 2019	2.029
Guest analyst: Sgt. Sean "Sticks" Larkin of the Tulsa (OK) Police Department Gang Unit; Departments and officers featured include: Williamson County (TX) Sheriff's Office (Lt. Grayson Kennedy & Det. Mark Luera), Richland County (SC) Sheriff's Department (Dep. Donnyray Campbell & Cpl. Josh Robinson), Santa Fe (NM) Police Department (Ofc. Andrew Laur & Ofc. Anthony Madrid), East Providence (RI) Police Department (Sgt. Michael Rapoza & Ofc. Ryan Cute), Salinas (CA) Police Department (Ofc. Mike Muscutt & Ofc. Evan Adams), Oklahoma Highway Patrol (Tpr. Jeff Laue & Tpr. Russell Callicoat), Greene County (MO) Sheriff's Office (Dep. Paige Rippee & Dep. Elizabeth Howard), and Lawrence (IN) Police Department (Ofc. Devin Randle & Ofc. Derek Byerly).
213	70	"06.12.19"	June 12, 2019	1.533
Guest analyst: Sgt. Sean "Sticks" Larkin of the Tulsa (OK) Police Department Gang Unit; Departments and officers featured include: Williamson County (TX) Sheriff's Office (Lt. Grayson Kennedy & Dep. Charles Duvall with K9 Kato), Richland County (SC) Sheriff's Department (Dep. Kenneth Fitzsimmons & Cpl. Gavin Walmsley with K9 Emy), Santa Fe (NM) Police Department (Ofc. Dianna Conklin & Ofc. Jacob Martinez), East Providence (RI) Police Department (Insp. Craig Sroka & Cpl. David Silva), Salinas (CA) Police Department (Ofc. Cameron Mitchell & Ofc. Tyler Provost), Oklahoma Highway Patrol (Tpr. Ryan Smith & Tpr. Mystal Perkins), Greene County (MO) Sheriff's Office (Dep. Kyle Winchell & Dep. Jason Flora), and Lawrence (IN) Police Department (Ofc. Stuart Bishop & Ofc. Charles Kingery).
214	71	"06.14.19"	June 14, 2019	1.985
Guest analyst: Sgt. Sean "Sticks" Larkin of the Tulsa (OK) Police Department Gang Unit; Departments and officers featured include: Williamson County (TX) Sheriff's Office (Det. Mark Luera & Dep. Charles Duvall with K9 Kato), Richland County (SC) Sheriff's Department (Sgt. Steven Tapler & Dep. Brandon Simmons), Santa Fe (NM) Police Department (Ofc. Charles Laramie & Ofc. Andrew Laur), East Providence (RI) Police Department (Ofc. Jacob Mount & Cpl. David Silva), Salinas (CA) Police Department (Ofc. Cameron Mitchell & Ofc. Evan Adams), Oklahoma Highway Patrol (Tpr. Chris Bunch & Tpr. Eric Foster), Greene County (MO) Sheriff's Office (Dep. Kyle Winchell & Dep. Morgan Rudderham with K9 Athos), and Lawrence (IN) Police Department (Ofc. Stuart Bishop & Ofc. Charles Kingery).
215	72	"06.15.19"	June 15, 2019	2.101
Guest analyst: Sgt. Sean "Sticks" Larkin of the Tulsa (OK) Police Department Gang Unit; Departments and officers featured include: Williamson County (TX) Sheriff's Office (Dep. James Johnson & Dep. Kyle Pence), Richland County (SC) Sheriff's Department (S/D Garo Brown & Cpl. Robert Furgal), Santa Fe (NM) Police Department (Ofc. Dianna Conklin & Ofc. Jacob Martinez), East Providence (RI) Police Department (Insp. Craig Sroka & Cpl. David Silva), Salinas (CA) Police Department (Ofc. Mike Muscutt & Ofc. Evan Adams), Oklahoma Highway Patrol (Tpr. Micah Freeman & Tpr. Leonardo Flores), Greene County (MO) Sheriff's Office (Dep. Elizabeth Howard & Dep. Kevin Baker), and Lawrence (IN) Police Department (Ofc. Devin Randle & Ofc. Derek Byerly).
216	73	"06.19.19"	June 19, 2019	1.388
Guest analyst: Sgt. Sean "Sticks" Larkin of the Tulsa (OK) Police Department Gang Unit; Departments and officers featured include: Williamson County (TX) Sheriff's Office (Lt. Grayson Kennedy & Det. Mark Luera), Richland County (SC) Sheriff's Department (Lt. Danny Brown & Dep. Daniel Mulcahy), Santa Fe (NM) Police Department (Ofc. Anthony Madrid & Ofc. Jacob Martinez), East Providence (RI) Police Department (Sgt. Michael Rapoza & Ofc. Jacob Mount), Salinas (CA) Police Department (Ofc. Tyler Provost & Ofc. Evan Adams), Oklahoma Highway Patrol (Tpr. Micah Freeman & Tpr. Eric Foster), Greene County (MO) Sheriff's Office (Dep. Jason Flora & Dep. Carl Scharpf), and Lawrence (IN) Police Department (Ofc. Stuart Bishop & Ofc. Charles Kingery).
217	74	"06.21.19"	June 21, 2019	2.367
Guest analyst: Sgt. Sean "Sticks" Larkin of the Tulsa (OK) Police Department Gang Unit; Departments and officers featured include: Williamson County (TX) Sheriff's Office (Lt. Grayson Kennedy & Det. Mark Luera), Richland County (SC) Sheriff's Department (Lt. Danny Brown & Dep. Daniel Mulcahy), Santa Fe (NM) Police Department (Ofc. Anthony Madrid & Ofc. Andrew Laur), East Providence (RI) Police Department (Cpl. David Silva & Ofc. Kyle Graves), Salinas (CA) Police Department (Ofc. Mike Muscutt & Ofc. Evan Adams), Oklahoma Highway Patrol (Tpr. Russell Callicoat & Tpr. Jeff Laue), Greene County (MO) Sheriff's Office (Dep. Morgan Rudderham with K9 Athos & Dep. Paige Rippee), and Lawrence (IN) Police Department (Ofc. Stuart Bishop & Ofc. Charles Kingery).
218	75	"06.22.19"	June 22, 2019	2.166
Guest analyst: Sgt. Sean "Sticks" Larkin of the Tulsa (OK) Police Department Gang Unit; Departments and officers featured include: Williamson County (TX) Sheriff's Office (Dep. Jarred Dalton & Dep. Brian Thomas), Richland County (SC) Sheriff's Department (Cpl. Josh Robinson & Cpl. Kristy Boyles), Santa Fe (NM) Police Department (Ofc. Dianna Conklin & Ofc. Jacob Martinez), East Providence (RI) Police Department (Cpl. David Silva & Insp. Craig Sroka), Salinas (CA) Police Department (Ofc. Cameron Mitchell & Ofc. Evan Adams), Oklahoma Highway Patrol (Tpr. Russell Callicoat & Tpr. Jeff Laue), Greene County (MO) Sheriff's Office (Dep. Elizabeth Howard & Dep. Paige Rippee), and Lawrence (IN) Police Department (Ofc. Stuart Bishop & Ofc. Charles Kingery).
219	76	"07.12.19"	July 12, 2019	1.948
Guest analyst: Sgt. Sean "Sticks" Larkin of the Tulsa (OK) Police Department Gang Unit; Departments and officers featured include: Williamson County (TX) Sheriff's Office (Lt. Grayson Kennedy & Det. Mark Luera), Richland County (SC) Sheriff's Department (Dep. Donnyray Campbell & Dep. Brandon Simmons), Lafayette (LA) Police Department (Ofc. Pablo Estrada & Cpl. Michael Milazzo), East Providence (RI) Police Department (Cpl. David Silva & Ofc. Ryan Cute), Salinas (CA) Police Department (Ofc. Mike Muscutt & Ofc. Daniel Martinez), Oklahoma Highway Patrol (Tpr. Russell Callicoat & Tpr. Jonathon Cotner), Greene County (MO) Sheriff's Office (Dep. Jason Flora & Dep. Paige Rippee), and Lawrence (IN) Police Department (Ofc. Adam Hazelwood with K9 Chedo & Ofc. Derek Byerly).
220	77	"07.13.19"	July 13, 2019	2.239
Guest analyst: Sgt. Sean "Sticks" Larkin of the Tulsa (OK) Police Department Gang Unit; Departments and officers featured include: Williamson County (TX) Sheriff's Office (Dep. James Johnson & Dep. Kyle Pence), Richland County (SC) Sheriff's Department (Dep. Daniel Mulcahy & M/D Jacob Murphy), Lafayette (LA) Police Department (Ofc. Pablo Estrada & Cpl. Michael Milazzo), East Providence (RI) Police Department (Insp. Craig Sroka & Ofc. Kyle Graves), Salinas (CA) Police Department (Ofc. Mike Muscutt & Ofc. Cameron Mitchell), Oklahoma Highway Patrol (Tpr. Russell Callicoat & Tpr. Jeff Laue), Greene County (MO) Sheriff's Office (Dep. Chris Higgins & Dep. Paige Rippee), and Lawrence (IN) Police Department (Ofc. Adam Hazelwood with K9 Chedo & Ofc. Derek Byerly).
221	78	"07.19.19"	July 19, 2019	2.182
Guest analyst: Sgt. Sean "Sticks" Larkin of the Tulsa (OK) Police Department Gang Unit; Departments and officers featured include: Williamson County (TX) Sheriff's Office (Lt. Grayson Kennedy & Lt. Mark Luera), Richland County (SC) Sheriff's Department (Cpl. Mark Laureano & Cpl. David Slemp), Lafayette (LA) Police Department (Ofc. Brandon Dugas & Ofc. Rob Green), East Providence (RI) Police Department (Ofc. Ryan Cute & Ofc. Kyle Graves), Salinas (CA) Police Department (Ofc. Mike Muscutt & Ofc. Daniel Martinez), Oklahoma Highway Patrol (Tpr. Chris Bunch & Tpr. Eric Foster), Greene County (MO) Sheriff's Office (Dep. Morgan Rudderham with K9 Athos & Dep. Paige Rippee), and Lawrence (IN) Police Department (Ofc. Stuart Bishop & Ofc. Charles Kingery).
222	79	"07.20.19"	July 20, 2019	2.159
Guest analyst: Sgt. Sean "Sticks" Larkin of the Tulsa (OK) Police Department Gang Unit; Departments and officers featured include: Williamson County (TX) Sheriff's Office (Dep. Jarred Dalton & Dep. Charles Duvall with K9 Kato), Richland County (SC) Sheriff's Department (Cpl. Gavin Walmsley with K9 Emy & Cpl. Kristy Boyles), Lafayette (LA) Police Department (Ofc. Brandon Dugas & Ofc. Rob Green), East Providence (RI) Police Department (Insp. Craig Sroka & Ofc. Jacob Mount), Salinas (CA) Police Department (Ofc. Mike Muscutt & Ofc. Daniel Martinez), Oklahoma Highway Patrol (Tpr. Micah Freeman & Tpr. Ryan Smith), Greene County (MO) Sheriff's Office (Dep. Kevin Baker & Dep. Paige Rippee), and Lawrence (IN) Police Department (Ofc. Stuart Bishop & Ofc. Charles Kingery).
223	80	"07.26.19"	July 26, 2019	1.933
Guest analyst: Sgt. Sean "Sticks" Larkin of the Tulsa (OK) Police Department Gang Unit; Departments and officers featured include: Williamson County (TX) Sheriff's Office (Lt. Mark Luera & Dep. Jason Johnston), Richland County (SC) Sheriff's Department (Lt. Danny Brown & Cpl. Robert Furgal), Lafayette (LA) Police Department (Cpl. Michael Milazzo & Ofc. Derek Melancon with K9 Ripo), East Providence (RI) Police Department (Sgt. Michael Rapoza & Ofc. Ryan Cute), Salinas (CA) Police Department (Ofc. Mike Muscutt & Ofc. Daniel Martinez), Oklahoma Highway Patrol (Tpr. Eric Foster & Tpr. Ryan Smith), Greene County (MO) Sheriff's Office (Dep. Morgan Rudderham with K9 Athos & Dep. Kyle Winchell), and Lawrence (IN) Police Department (Ofc. Stuart Bishop & Ofc. Matt Weber).
224	81	"07.27.19"	July 27, 2019	1.936
Guest analyst: Sgt. Sean "Sticks" Larkin of the Tulsa (OK) Police Department Gang Unit; Departments and officers featured include: Williamson County (TX) Sheriff's Office (Lt. Grayson Kennedy & Dep. Kyle Pence), Richland County (SC) Sheriff's Department (Sgt. Steven Tapler & S/D Garo Brown), Lafayette (LA) Police Department (Cpl. Michael Milazzo & Ofc. Derek Melancon with K9 Ripo), East Providence (RI) Police Department (Insp. Craig Sroka & Cpl. David Silva), Salinas (CA) Police Department (Ofc. Mike Muscutt & Ofc. Cameron Mitchell), Oklahoma Highway Patrol (Tpr. Aaron Nickell & Tpr. Cliff Kinsler), Greene County (MO) Sheriff's Office (Dep. AJ McCall & Dep. Kyle Winchell), and Lawrence (IN) Police Department (Ofc. Stuart Bishop & Ofc. Charles Kingery).
225	82	"07.30.19"	July 30, 2019	1.272
Guest analyst: Sgt. Sean "Sticks" Larkin of the Tulsa (OK) Police Department Gang Unit; Departments and officers featured include: Williamson County (TX) Sheriff's Office (Lt. Grayson Kennedy & Dep. Brian Thomas), Richland County (SC) Sheriff's Department (Lt. Danny Brown & S/D Garo Brown), Lafayette (LA) Police Department (Cpl. Ricky Fontenot & Ofc. Joshua Stelly), East Providence (RI) Police Department (Ofc. Jacob Mount & Ofc. Ryan Cute), Salinas (CA) Police Department (Ofc. Mike Muscutt & Ofc. Evan Adams), Oklahoma Highway Patrol (Tpr. Micah Freeman & Tpr. Ryan Smith), Greene County (MO) Sheriff's Office (Dep. Carl Scharpf & Dep. Kyle Winchell), and Lawrence (IN) Police Department (Ofc. Jason Heiney & Ofc. Adam Hazelwood with K9 Chedo).
226	83	"08.02.19"	August 2, 2019	2.168
Guest analyst: Ofc. Charles Kingery of the Lawrence (IN) Police Department; Departments and officers featured include: Williamson County (TX) Sheriff's Office (Lt. Grayson Kennedy & Lt. Mark Luera), Richland County (SC) Sheriff's Department (Lt. Danny Brown & Dep. Kenneth Fitzsimmons), Lafayette (LA) Police Department (Cpl. Bart Ryder & Ofc. Brandon Dugas), East Providence (RI) Police Department (Cpl. David Silva & Ofc. Kyle Graves), Salinas (CA) Police Department (Ofc. Cameron Mitchell & Ofc. Evan Adams), Oklahoma Highway Patrol (Tpr. Russell Callicoat & Tpr. Jonathon Cotner), Greene County (MO) Sheriff's Office (Dep. Morgan Rudderham with K9 Athos & Dep. Kyle Winchell), and Lawrence (IN) Police Department (Ofc. Stuart Bishop & Ofc. Matt Weber).
227	84	"08.03.19"	August 3, 2019	2.044
Guest analyst: Ofc. Charles Kingery of the Lawrence (IN) Police Department; Departments and officers featured include: Williamson County (TX) Sheriff's Office (Dep. Jarred Dalton & Dep. Brian Thomas), Richland County (SC) Sheriff's Department (Cpl. Mark Laureano & Dep. Daniel Mulcahy), Lafayette (LA) Police Department (Cpl. Ricky Fontenot & Ofc. Brandon Dugas), East Providence (RI) Police Department (Insp. Craig Sroka & Ofc. Kyle Graves), Salinas (CA) Police Department (Ofc. Mike Muscutt & Ofc. Daniel Martinez), Oklahoma Highway Patrol (Tpr. Russell Callicoat & Tpr. Vince Curtis), Greene County (MO) Sheriff's Office (Dep. Paige Rippee & Dep. Kyle Winchell), and Lawrence (IN) Police Department (Ofc. Stuart Bishop & Ofc. Matt Weber).
228	85	"08.09.19"	August 9, 2019	2.149
Guest analyst: Sgt. Sean "Sticks" Larkin of the Tulsa (OK) Police Department Gang Unit; Departments and officers featured include: Williamson County (TX) Sheriff's Office (Lt. Mark Luera & Dep. Charles Duvall with K9 Kato), Richland County (SC) Sheriff's Department (Cpl. David Fairbanks & Cpl. Robert Furgal), Lafayette (LA) Police Department (Ofc. Jordan Colla & Ofc. Morgan Colla), East Providence (RI) Police Department (Cpl. David Silva & Ofc. Kyle Graves), Salinas (CA) Police Department (Ofc. Cameron Mitchell & Ofc. Evan Adams), Oklahoma Highway Patrol (Tpr. Derek Fry & Tpr. Brian Conaghan), Greene County (MO) Sheriff's Office (Dep. Paige Rippee & Dep. Kyle Winchell), and Lawrence (IN) Police Department (Ofc. Jason Heiney & Ofc. Matt Weber).
229	86	"08.10.19"	August 10, 2019	2.009
Guest analyst: Sgt. Sean "Sticks" Larkin of the Tulsa (OK) Police Department Gang Unit; Departments and officers featured include: Williamson County (TX) Sheriff's Office (Dep. James Johnson & Dep. Jason Johnston), Richland County (SC) Sheriff's Department (Sgt. Steven Tapler & S/D Garo Brown), Lafayette (LA) Police Department (Cpl. Michael Milazzo & Ofc. Amelia Soileau), East Providence (RI) Police Department (Cpl. David Silva & Insp. Craig Sroka), Salinas (CA) Police Department (Ofc. Cameron Mitchell & Ofc. Nicholas Abruzzini), Oklahoma Highway Patrol (Tpr. Russell Callicoat & Tpr. Vince Curtis), Greene County (MO) Sheriff's Office (Dep. Paige Rippee & Dep. Kyle Winchell), and Lawrence (IN) Police Department (Ofc. Jason Heiney & Ofc. Matt Weber).
230	87	"08.16.19"	August 16, 2019	2.027
Guest analyst: Sgt. Sean "Sticks" Larkin of the Tulsa (OK) Police Department Gang Unit and Trooper Russell Callicoat of the Oklahoma Highway Patrol; Departments and officers featured include: Williamson County (TX) Sheriff's Office (Lt. Grayson Kennedy & Lt. Mark Luera), Richland County (SC) Sheriff's Department (Lt. Danny Brown & Cpl. Kristy Boyles), Lafayette (LA) Police Department (Ofc. Brandon Dugas & Ofc. Rob Green), East Providence (RI) Police Department (Sgt. Michael Rapoza & Ofc. Ryan Cute), Salinas (CA) Police Department (Ofc. Mike Muscutt & Ofc. Evan Adams), Oklahoma Highway Patrol (Tpr. Leonardo Flores & Tpr. Ryan Smith), Greene County (MO) Sheriff's Office (Dep. Kelsey Whitcomb & Dep. AJ McCall), and Lawrence (IN) Police Department (Ofc. John Clark with K9 Sorbon & Sgt. Gabe Slaybaugh).
231	88	"08.17.19"	August 17, 2019	1.986
Guest analyst: Sgt. Sean "Sticks" Larkin of the Tulsa (OK) Police Department Gang Unit and Trooper Russell Callicoat of the Oklahoma Highway Patrol; Departments and officers featured include: Williamson County (TX) Sheriff's Office (Dep. Jarred Dalton & Dep. Brian Thomas), Richland County (SC) Sheriff's Department (Cpl. Mark Laureano & Cpl. Josh Robinson), Lafayette (LA) Police Department (Ofc. Brandon Dugas & Ofc. Rob Green), East Providence (RI) Police Department (Insp. Craig Sroka & Ofc. Ryan Cute), Salinas (CA) Police Department (Ofc. Mike Muscutt & Ofc. Cameron Mitchell), Oklahoma Highway Patrol (Tpr. Aaron Nickell & Tpr. Cliff Kinsler), Greene County (MO) Sheriff's Office (Dep. AJ McCall & Dep. Elizabeth Howard), and Lawrence (IN) Police Department (Ofc. Jason Heiney & Ofc. Matt Weber).
232	89	"08.23.19"	August 23, 2019	2.102
Guest analyst: Sgt. Sean "Sticks" Larkin of the Tulsa (OK) Police Department Gang Unit; Departments and officers featured include: Williamson County (TX) Sheriff's Office (Lt. Grayson Kennedy & Lt. Mark Luera), Richland County (SC) Sheriff's Department (Lt. Danny Brown & Dep. Donnyray Campbell), Lafayette (LA) Police Department (Ofc. Jordan Colla & Ofc. Morgan Colla), East Providence (RI) Police Department (Sgt. Michael Rapoza & Ofc. Ryan Cute), Salinas (CA) Police Department (Ofc. Mike Muscutt & Ofc. Evan Adams), Oklahoma Highway Patrol (Tpr. Aaron Nickell & Tpr. Micah Freeman), Greene County (MO) Sheriff's Office (Dep. AJ McCall & Dep. Kyle Winchell), and Lawrence (IN) Police Department (Ofc. Stuart Bishop & Ofc. Charles Kingery).
233	90	"08.24.19"	August 24, 2019	1.964
Guest analyst: Sgt. Sean "Sticks" Larkin of the Tulsa (OK) Police Department Gang Unit; Departments and officers featured include: Williamson County (TX) Sheriff's Office (Dep. Jason Johnston & Dep. James Johnson), Richland County (SC) Sheriff's Department (Dep. Daniel Mulcahy & Dep. Brandon Simmons), Lafayette (LA) Police Department (Ofc. Jordan Colla & Ofc. Morgan Colla), East Providence (RI) Police Department (Insp. Craig Sroka & Ofc. Kyle Graves), Salinas (CA) Police Department (Ofc. Cameron Mitchell & Ofc. Nicholas Abruzzini), Oklahoma Highway Patrol (Tpr. Russell Callicoat & Tpr. Jeff Laue), Greene County (MO) Sheriff's Office (Dep. Kevin Baker & Dep. Kyle Winchell), and Lawrence (IN) Police Department (Ofc. Stuart Bishop & Ofc. Charles Kingery).
