= Zoraida Sambolin =

American journalist

- Born: July 10, 1965 (age 60)
- Occupation: Television journalist
- Employer: WMAQ (NBC)
- Spouse: Kenny Williams (2014-)

Zoraida Senoba Sambolin (born July 10, 1965) is an American television journalist.

== Biography ==
Sambolin is of Puerto Rican descent. Most recently, Sambolin was the host of Early Start on CNN. Sambolin is a native of Chicago and anchored news broadcasts for local affiliates WMAQ-TV (NBC) as well as WSNS-TV for nine years.

In January 2013, it was announced that Sambolin was engaged to baseball executive Kenny Williams. In May 2013, Sambolin announced that she had breast cancer and got a double mastectomy on May 28, 2013. She stated that she "struggled for weeks" to find the best way to make this information public, and ended up doing so while discussing Angelina Jolie's New York Times OpEd piece describing her own double mastectomy.

== Career ==
Sambolin created and hosted Small Talk for Parents on PBS station WYCC-TV and hosted Nuestros Niños on Telemundo affiliate WSNS-TV from 1999 to 2002.

She joined Chicago NBC affiliate WMAQ-TV as a freelance weekend news anchor in 2002. She then joined WSNS-TV the following year as a reporter and anchor, making her the first Chicago on-air broadcaster to work at both English and Spanish-language stations simultaneously. At WSNS, she launched the weekly health and family series Nuestra Familia. In 2007, she was promoted to weekday anchor of NBC 5 News Today at 4:30 am, which she hosted alongside Rob Elgas. The program was a pioneer in early morning newscasts which later set a trend in Chicago and other major markets across the United States.

Sambolin hosted Un Buen Doctor, a weekly medical series focusing on health issues affecting Latinos airing on cable stations internationally.

Sambolin left WMAQ in November 2011 to co-anchor CNN's morning program Early Start alongside Ashleigh Banfield. On December 13, 2013 Sambolin signed off from Early Start stating the primary reason was for her children and to be closer to family in the Chicago area.

On April 23, 2014 it was announced that Sambolin would be rejoining WMAQ as co-anchor of NBC 5 news Today and will co-anchor alongside Stefan Holt. She began May 22, and left in October, 2021.

Sambolin has a son, Nicholas Hobbs [12], who is a member of the University of Iowa Basketball team. Nicholas is a pre-business major.
