= Early Start with Rahel Solomon =

- Genre: Morning television show
- Presented by: Rahel Solomon
- Country of origin: United States
- Original language: English

Production
- Production locations: 30 Hudson Yards; New York City; CNN Studios; Washington, DC
- Camera setup: Multi-camera
- Running time: 60 minutes 120 minutes (breaking news coverage)

Original release
- Network: CNN; CNN International
- Release: March 10, 2025 – May 1, 2026

Related
- CNN This Morning with Audie Cornish; CNN This Morning Weekend

Early Start with Rahel Solomon is an American early-morning news program that was broadcast by CNN. Premiering on March 10, 2025, and anchored by CNN correspondent Rahel Solomon, it was initially announced as part of a revision to CNN's lineup, which also saw CNN This Morning cut to an hour, and anchor Kasie Hunt (who was moved to an afternoon show) succeeded by Audie Cornish.

The program was initially announced under the title 5 Things with Rahel Solomon, acting as a spin-off of CNN's podcast and online newsletter of the same name (which had also been the basis for a Kate Bolduan-hosted program on the short-lived CNN+). It was retitled Early Start shortly before its premiere, taking on the branding that was formerly used for an early-morning program on CNN from 2012 to 2024. Early Start usually aired for an hour from 5:00 to 6:00 a.m. ET. During significant news events, the program was occasionally extended to two hours beginning at 4:00 a.m. ET.

Amid the 2026 Iran war, Early Start began to include reporters from CNN's Middle East bureaus, including Connect the World anchor Becky Anderson (from Abu Dhabi), and correspondent Eleni Giokos (from Dubai).

On March 23, 2026, Solomon announced her departure from CNN and Early Start. For a period afterward, the program continued with substitute anchors. On May 4, 2026, Early Start was quietly dropped from the CNN schedule, and replaced with a simulcast of the 5 a.m. hour of CNN Headline Express from the CNN Headlines streaming channel.

Preceded by overnight program	Early Start with Rahel Solomon; 5:00 am – 6:00 am	Succeeded by CNN This Morning with Audie Cornish
