= Banfield (TV program) =

American television news program

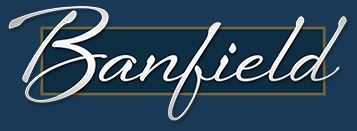
- Genre: News program; Current affairs
- Inspired by: Larry King Live
- Presented by: Ashleigh Banfield
- Theme music composer: Stephen Arnold Music
- No. of seasons: 1

Production
- Production locations: Chicago, Illinois (Nexstar)
- Running time: 60 minutes
- Production company: Nexstar Media Group

Original release
- Network: NewsNation
- Release: March 1, 2021 – January 16, 2026

Banfield is a nightly American television news program on NewsNation, which ran from March 1, 2021 to January 16, 2026. The hourlong program hosted by Ashleigh Banfield is inspired by Larry King Live. The program aired weeknights at 10 p.m. ET and re-aired at 1 a.m. and 4 a.m. ET with rebroadcasts on the weekend.

On December 12, 2025, Banfield announced that she would be leaving her show Banfield in January 2026, after five years; Banfield made the decision to end her show to focus more on her true-crime podcast.

== Format ==
Banfield stated that Banfield would generally focus on one guest for an hour and focus on having a "conversation" without interrogatory questions. The original first guest was to be Larry King until he died. At interviews prior to launch, Banfield said that she would attempt to seek out "thought leaders" from all over the political spectrum and promised "fact-based, unbiased journalism" that would prioritize the "health of the viewer." The first week of guests included Aaron Sorkin, Bryan Cranston, Robin Wright, and Keith Olbermann. However, other shows may have multiple guests depending on items in the news. The program was broadcast from a studio in Connecticut.

== Reception ==
Despite promotion on the over 100 Nexstar Media Group stations as well as on NewsNation, ratings for Banfield have been low. The premiere episode with Aaron Sorkin had 17,000 viewers with 5,000 in the 25-54 demographic prized by advertisers. This was 38% fewer viewers and 50% fewer viewers in the 25-54 age group than the hour of NewsNation Prime it replaced.
