= Starting Point (TV program) =

Former CNN Program

- Also known as: Starting Point with Soledad O'Brien
- Presented by: Soledad O'Brien: January 2, 2012-March 29, 2013
- Country of origin: United States
- Original language: English

Production
- Executive producer: Shannon High
- Production location: New York City
- Camera setup: Multi-camera
- Running time: 120 minutes

Original release
- Network: CNN
- Release: January 2, 2012 – June 14, 2013

Starting Point (formerly Starting Point with Soledad O'Brien) is a morning television show on CNN anchored by Soledad O'Brien. The show aired from January 2012 to June 2013. Together with the program Early Start (4.00–6.00 a.m. weekdays), it replaced American Morning, which ran from September 2001 to December 2011, under a variety of presenters. Starting Point was itself replaced by New Day in June 2013, which is broadcast from 6.00–9.00 a.m. daily.

== Format ==
CNN described the show as a "conversational ensemble" with O'Brien at its center. It was broadcast from CNN's studios in New York City, but had also broadcast in various diners around the United States. Frequent panelists included Will Cain, Margaret Hoover, and Roland S. Martin.

=== 2012 presidential election ===
The show followed the 2012 Republican primary trail by broadcasting from states where primaries are held, usually in local diners and cafes. In its first two weeks, O'Brien anchored first from Des Moines, Iowa and then Manchester, New Hampshire to cover the Iowa caucuses and New Hampshire primary respectively. Other cities the show has covered include Charleston, South Carolina and Jacksonville Beach, Florida.

== History ==
Reports emerged in September 2011 that CNN was seeking to replace American Morning due to poor ratings by bringing Soledad O'Brien back to its morning lineup. O'Brien co-hosted American Morning from 2003 to 2007. By November 2011, CNN announced that American Morning would be replaced by two new programs, with O'Brien anchoring the second slot from 7:00-9:00AM. The show's name was announced as Starting Point via Twitter.

The show premiered on January 2, 2012, and aired weekdays from 7 a.m. to 9 a.m. ET. Along with Early Start, Starting Point replaced American Morning, which aired from 2001 to 2011.

The show received poor ratings, and was canceled in early 2013 by CNN executive Jeff Zucker. The final show with O'Brien as host aired on March 29, 2013. Starting Point was replaced by New Day, co-anchored by Chris Cuomo and Kate Bolduan. CNN announced that O'Brien would continue to produce documentaries for CNN and other networks by launching her own start-up production company, Starfish Media Group.

Preceded by Early Start	CNN Weekday Lineup; 7:00AM–9:00AM	Succeeded by CNN Newsroom
