= Ashleigh Banfield =

Canadian-American journalist (born 1967)

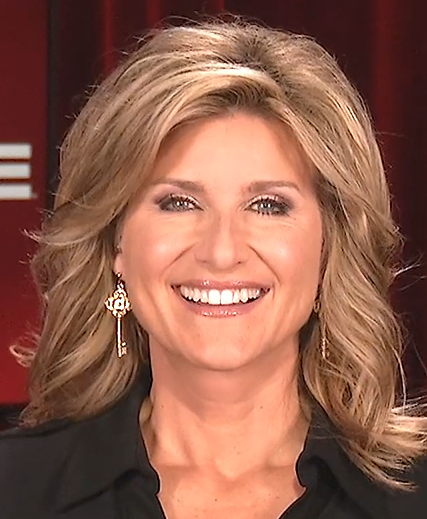
- Banfield in 2019
- Born: December 29, 1967 (age 58); Winnipeg, Manitoba, Canada
- Education: Balmoral Hall School
- Alma mater: Queen's University (BA); University of British Columbia (BA)
- Years active: 1988–present
- Title: Anchor, Banfield
- Spouses: Howard Gould (m. 2004; div. 2014); Chris Haynor (m. 2017)
- Children: 2
- Relatives: Michelle MacLaren (cousin)

Ashleigh Dennistoun Banfield (born December 29, 1967) is a Canadian-American journalist and former host of Banfield on the NewsNation network. She is also a former host of Legal View with Ashleigh Banfield and Early Start on CNN.

== Education ==
Banfield was educated at Balmoral Hall School, a private university preparatory school in Winnipeg, Manitoba, which she left in 1985 (also attended by her mother, Suzie [Holland] Lount, in the 1950s). She went on to obtain a Bachelor of Arts degree in political science and French from Queen's University in Kingston, Ontario, in 1988 and continued her studies in French at the University of British Columbia, in Vancouver, British Columbia, graduating in 1992.

== Career ==
=== Canada ===
Banfield began her career in 1988 at CJBN-TV in Kenora, Ontario, and at CKY-TV in Winnipeg later that year. From 1989 to 1992, she anchored the weekend news for CFRN-TV in Edmonton. She worked at CICT-TV in Calgary, as a producer from 1992 to 1993 and as evening news anchor and business correspondent from 1993 to 1995. Banfield won two Iris Awards in 1994 in the categories of Best News Documentary and Best of Festival.

Banfield was a freelance associate producer for ABC's World News Tonight during her tenure at CICT-TV. She covered the 1991 Bush/Gorbachev Summit in Russia and the April 1993 Clinton/Yeltsin Summit in Vancouver.

=== United States ===
In the mid-90s, she began working for KDFW, first hosting News 4 Texas Daybreak and later co-hosting News 4 Texas at 5:00 and News 4 Texas at 9:00 with Steve Eager.

In early 2000, Banfield was hired by national cable network MSNBC after having won an Emmy for her reporting at Dallas broadcast station KDFW-TV. According to The New York Times, she "fit nicely with MSNBC's positioning as the news network of choice for younger viewers". She also hosted MSNBC Investigates, worked at NBC News, and became a host of HomePage along with Gina Gaston and Mika Brzezinski.

On September 11, 2001, Banfield was reporting from the streets of Manhattan amid a cloud of debris from the collapsing World Trade Center. She was reporting a few blocks north of the site when 7 World Trade Center collapsed behind her. After the initial reporting of the attack had ended, Banfield received a promotion, as MSNBC sent her around the world as the producer of a new program, A Region in Conflict. Banfield lost two friends in the World Trade Center attacks and sought help for post-traumatic stress disorder.

During the conflict in Afghanistan, Banfield interviewed Taliban prisoners, and visited a hospital in Kabul. Later entries covered her travels from Jalalabad to Kabul, as well as other experiences in Afghanistan. In Pakistan, she interviewed Father Gregory Rice, a Roman Catholic priest in Pakistan, and an Iraqi woman aiding refugees. After A Region in Conflict, she received the 10 pm timeslot with the show Ashleigh Banfield on Location.

In April 2003, in a Landon Lecture Series speech at Kansas State University, Banfield raised concerns regarding media coverage of the conflict in Iraq. She spoke against "cable news operators who wrap themselves in the American flag and go after a certain target demographic" and specifically named Fox News Channel as an example. The New York Times reported that her speech angered MSNBC-controlling NBC management, who rebuked her and lowered her profile. "They just fell in love with a new toy and they played with it and played with it and played with it until the paint came off", said an NBC News correspondent of the network's relationship with Banfield.

I was office-less for ten months ... No phone, no computer. For ten months I had to report to work every day and ask where I could sit. If somebody was away I could use their desk. Eventually, after ten months of this, I was given an office that was a tape closet. They cleared the tapes out and put a desk and a TV in there, and a computer and phone. It was pretty blatant. The message was crystal clear. Yet they wouldn't let me leave. I begged for seventeen months to be let out of my contract. If they had no use for me, let's just part ways amicably—no need for payouts, just a clean break. And Neal [Shapiro, the news president of NBC] wouldn't allow it. I don't know what his rationale was—perhaps he thought I would take what I felt was a very strong brand, and others felt was a very strong brand, to another network and make a success of it. Maybe that's why he chose to keep me in a warehouse. I will never forgive him for his cruelty and the manner in which he decided to dispose of me.

— Banfield in New Canaan-Darien Magazine, January 2009

Banfield joined CourtTV (renamed TruTV) in 2005. She was the co-host of the trial coverage show Banfield & Ford: Courtside weekdays from 1 to 3PM ET with Jack Ford. On June 1, 2009, Banfield took over as host of the truTV series Open Court weekdays from 9 to 11 a.m. ET, formerly hosted by Lisa Bloom. Her last major assignment with the network was reporting on the Casey Anthony trial.

Banfield joined CNN in January 2012 as co-anchor with Zoraida Sambolin, of the network's morning show, Early Start. On August 13, 2012, Banfield moved to the 11 a.m. edition of CNN Newsroom in New York each weekday, replacing Kyra Phillips as anchor. On August 6, 2013, it was announced that CNN would rebrand its 11 a.m. hour of CNN Newsroom. The show, called Legal View with Ashleigh Banfield, aired at 12 noon Eastern. In 2014, Banfield was featured in a small role portraying herself in the Netflix series House of Cards, where she interviewed Claire Underwood. In October, Banfield joined CNN sister station HLN as host on the legal issues interview program Primetime Justice with Ashleigh Banfield, which aired at 8 p.m. Monday to Thursday. In December 2017, the show was re-branded as Crime & Justice with Ashleigh Banfield.

On October 16, 2018, it was announced by HLN that Banfield was to be laid off, along with Michaela Pereira and Carol Costello, as part of the network's decision to scale back their live news programming. Final broadcasts of the shows hosted by all three presenters were aired on Friday, October 26, 2018. She then was the inaugural host of the A&E show Live Rescue. After the first season, Matt Iseman took over as host.

She resumed hosting programs on CourtTV, including the true crime documentary series Judgment with Ashleigh Banfield in 2020. The program recaps past high-profile trials and provides updates on the individuals involved. She also appeared as a special contributor on their evening courtroom highlight show.

In January 2021, Banfield was announced as the host to replace the third hour of NewsNation Prime on NewsNation, with the self-titled show Banfield, which ended in January 2026 after five years; Banfield made the decision to end her show to focus more on her true-crime podcast.

As of 2025, she serves as a fill-in host for Dan Abrams on On Patrol: Live, which airs Friday and Saturday nights on Reelz.

== Personal life ==
Banfield was born in Winnipeg, Manitoba, the daughter of Suzanne Elizabeth (Holland) and John Alexander Banfield. She was known for her "trademark rectangular eyeglasses, the object of countless remarks, pro and con, after her arrival on the national media scene." In 2016, she had refractive lens exchange surgery that corrected her far-sightedness. Banfield is a cousin of television writer and director Michelle MacLaren.

In 2004, Banfield married real estate financier Howard Gould, who founded the carbon credit trading company Equator Environmental, and is a great-grandson of railroad developer Jay Gould. The wedding took place aboard a wooden yacht at the Royal Lake of the Woods Yacht Club in Canada. They have two sons, Jay and Ridley. She filed for divorce in Connecticut in 2011.

Banfield became a naturalized U.S. citizen on October 24, 2008.

On December 29, 2017, Banfield's 50th birthday, she married sales executive Chris Haynor, her partner of three years, at the Hermitage Club ski lodge in Wilmington, Vermont.
