= Christine Romans =

American business news anchor

- Born: Iowa, U.S.
- Education: Iowa State University (BA)
- Occupations: News anchor; author
- Employer: NBC News
- Spouse: Ed Tobin
- Children: 3

Christine Romans is an American broadcast journalist and author. She serves as the chief business correspondent for NBC News and anchors Current with Christine Romans on NBC News Now. She previously was the chief business correspondent and anchor for CNN's Early Start.

== Early life ==
Romans is from Le Claire, Iowa. She graduated from Pleasant Valley High School in 1989. She graduated from Iowa State University in 1993, majoring in French, journalism, and mass communication. She also studied French media and French literature at the Catholic University of Lyon in France during the summer of 1991.

== Career ==
Romans reported for several newspapers including the Des Moines Register and Knight-Ridder. She then was a reporter and anchor for Reuters Television. She joined CNN in 1999 and began reporting from the floor of the New York Stock Exchange. She next hosted CNN's On the Money and was a reporter and substitute anchor on Lou Dobbs Tonight. She also hosted Street Sweep on the defunct network CNNfn. In January 2014, she was named as the new anchor for Early Start. A year later, Romans published her third book titled Smart Is the New Rich: Money Guide for Millennials.

On July 28, 2023, Romans announced her departure from CNN. That same day, it was reported she would move to NBC News. On October 30, 2023, Romans was officially announced as a senior business correspondent for NBC News and MSNBC. In April 2026, Romans was promoted to chief business correspondent for NBC News and would anchor a two-hour news program on NBC News Now. On August 3, 2026, her news program titled Current with Christine Romans debuted.

== Personal life ==
She is married to Ed Tobin, and the couple has three children.

== Books ==
- Romans, Christine (2010). Smart Is the New Rich: If You Can't Afford It, Put It Down. Wiley. ISBN 978-0-470-64206-1.
- Romans, Christine; Velshi, Ali (2011). How to Speak Money: The Language and Knowledge You Need Now. Wiley. ISBN 978-1-118-11495-7.
- Romans, Christine (2015). Smart Is the New Rich: Money Guide for Millennials. Wiley. ISBN 978-1-118-94935-1.

== See also ==
- New Yorkers in journalism
