= Rahel Solomon =

Ethiopian-American television journalist

- Born: Sudan
- Education: St. John's University (B.S.); Northwestern University (M.A.)
- Occupation: Journalist
- Television: WSAZ-TV; KCNC-TV; KYW-TV; CNBC; CNN
- Spouse: Marcel S. Pratt (m. 2024)

Rahel Solomon is an Sudanese-born Ethiopian-American television journalist. She previously worked for CNN serving as a business reporter, and anchor of the early-morning program Early Start with Rahel Solomon.

== Early life ==
Solomon was born in Sudan to parents of Ethiopian origin. She moved to the United States at the age of three where her parents first settled in West Philadelphia. Solomon was raised in Delaware County and is a graduate of Archbishop Prendergast High School in the Drexel Hill neighborhood of Upper Darby Township, Pennsylvania. In 2010, she graduated with a B.S. in finance from St. John's University in Queens, New York City; and then with a M.A. from the Medill School of Journalism at Northwestern University in Evanston, Illinois.

Solomon has lived in various places, including West Virginia, Colorado, France, Spain and Italy, where she resided while partaking in a study-abroad program. She has lived most of her life in the Greater Philadelphia area.

== Career ==
After school, Solomon worked as a multimedia journalist for WSAZ-TV in Charleston, West Virginia; and then in January 2014, she accepted a position as a reporter and fill-in anchor at CBS-affiliate KCNC-TV in Denver, Colorado. In 2015, she was named 2015 Broadcast Journalist of the Year by the Colorado Association of Black Journalists. From 2017 to 2019, Solomon was the morning anchor for KYW-TV in Philadelphia. She would leave the station to become a reporter for CNBC.

In April 2022, Solomon joined CNN as a correspondent, and in 2025 became the host of the early-morning newscast Early Start. On March 23, 2026, Solomon announced that she would depart CNN.

== Personal life ==
On July 13, 2024, Solomon married Philadelphia-based lawyer Marcel S. Pratt at the Philadelphia Museum of Art.

She regards herself as an "on-again, off again" long-distance runner, stating that "I've done a half marathon, a full marathon and multiple 10-milers", and that, "When I'm in the swing of it, I love long distance runs".
