= 23rd Iris Awards (Uruguay) =

23rd Iris Uruguay Awards
- Date: September 1, 2018
- Location: Enjor Hotel & Casino, Punta del Este
- Presented by: Diario El País
- Most awards: Television: Canal 10 (6)
- Most nominations: Television: Canal 10 (17); Radio: Radio Del Sol (7)

Television/radio coverage
- Network: Canal 10, Canal 4, Teledoce

The 23rd Iris Awards ceremony, presented by the newspaper El País, honored the best of radio, television and social networks in Uruguay of 2017 and took place at the Enjoy Hotel & Casino, Punta del Este. It was held on September 1, 2018, and was broadcast by Teledoce, Canal 4 and Canal 10. The ceremony did not have a single host, but different presenters hosted it for a certain time, thus fulfilling a time for the channel that transmitted the event.

During the ceremony, El País presented Iris Awards to television in 14 categories, to radio in 6 and to internet and social networks in 2. It also presented the Golden Iris Award, the Iris for Career, the Special Iris and the Iris of the public.

== Winners and nominees ==
=== Television ===
Best Journalism	Best Magazine
Todas las voces (Canal 4); Santo y seña (Canal 4); ¿Quién es Quién? (Televisión Nacional Uruguay)	Desayunos informales (Teledoce); Buen Día Uruguay (Canal 4); La Mañana en Casa (Canal 10)
Best Newscast	Best Talent Show
Subrayado (Canal 10); Telemundo (Teledoce); Telenoche (Canal 4)	MasterChef (Canal 10); Master Class (Teledoce); Maybelline Model (Canal 4)
Best Entertainment Program	Best General Interest Program
Agitando una más (Canal 4); Escape perfecto (Canal 10); Salven el millón (Canal 10)	Esta boca es mía (Teledoce); Consentidas (Canal 10); Algo contigo (Canal 4)
Best Sports Program	Best TV Documentary
Fox Sports radio (Fox Sports); Pasión (VTV); Punto Penal (Canal 10)	El origen (Teledoce); Uruguayos en el mundo (Canal 10); Ídolos (Teledoce)
Best Testimonial Program	Best Male Presenter
Por la camiseta (Canal 10); Esta es mi familia (Teledoce); Súbete a mi moto (Teledoce)	Luis Alberto Carballo (for Algo contigo - Canal 4); Jorge Piñeyrúa (for Bendita TV - Canal 10); Jorge Echagüe (for Desayunos informales - Teledoce); Alberto Sonsol (for Escape Perfecto - Canal 10); Ignacio Álvarez (for Santo y Seña - Canal 4)
Best Female Presenter	Best Humorous Work
Soledad Ortega (for Buen Día Uruguay - Canal 4); Claudia Fernández (for Bendita TV - Canal 10); Victoria Rodríguez (for Esta boca es mía - Teledoce); Catalina Ferrand (for Día a Dia - VTV); Paola Bianco (for MasterClass - Teledoce)	Petru Valensky (for La mañana en casa - Canal 10); Gaspar Valverde (for Púmbate - Canal 10); Marcel Keoroglian (for Desayunos informales - Teledoce); Diego Delgrossi (for Consentidas - Canal 10); Pablo Fabregat (for Sonríe, te estamos grabando - Teledoce)
Best News Journalism	Best Revelation
Malena Castaldi (for Telemundo - Teledoce; Iliana Da Silva (for Telemundo - Teledoce); Aureliano Folle (for Subrayado - Canal 10); Marcelo Irachet (for Telenoche - Canal 4); Georgina Mayo (for Info TNU - National Television)	Laurent Lainé (for MasterChef - Canal 10); Óscar Andrade (for Todas las Voces - Canal 4); Conrado Hughes (for Todas las Voces - Canal 4); Florencia Sagasti (for Telenoche - Canal 4); Camila Rajchman (for Desayunos informales - Teledoce)

=== Radio ===
Best Journalism	Best Comedy Program
Así nos va (Carve); Hora de cierre (Sarandí); Las cosas en su sitio (Sarandí); No toquen nada (Del Sol); En perspectiva (Oriental)	La mesa de los galanes (Del Sol); Café Express (La Ley); Locos por el fútbol (Del Sol); Malos Pensamientos (Azul); Justicia Infinita (Oriental)
Best Sports Program	Best General Interest Program
100% deporte (Sport 890); Fútbol y cia. (Del Sol); Tuya y mía (El espectador); La oral deportiva (Universal); Las voces del fútbol (1010 AM)	De taquito (Universal); Hacemos lo que podemos (Catorce 10); Abrepalabra (Océano FM); Suena tremendo (El espectador); Viva la tarde (Sarandí)
Best Host	Best Revelation
Orlando Petinatti (for Malos Pensamientos - Azul ); Ignacio Álvarez (for Las cosas en su sitio - Sarandí); María Noel Marrone (for ¿Quién te dice? - Del Sol); Gustavo Rey (for Abrepalabra - Océano FM); Fernando Vilar (for No está todo dicho - Monte Carlo)	Jorge Seré (for Tuya y Mía - El espectador); Verónica Piñeyrúa (Radiomental - Azul); Pablo Rodríguez (for Las cosas en su sitio - Sarandí); Camilo Fernández (for La mesa de los galanes - Del Sol); Yuri Jakimczuk (for Locos por el fútbol - Del Sol)

=== Internet and Social Networks ===
Influencer of the year	Best Network Communicator
Yao Cabrera; Federico Vigevani; Agus Padilla; Federico Puñales	Camila Rajchman; Andrea Vila; Patricia Wolf; Orlando Petinatti; Ana Inés Martínez

=== Other awards ===
Public Iris Award	Iris Award for Career
Café Express	María Noel Riccetto
Special Iris Award	Golden Iris Award
Daniel Hadad	MasterChef
