= 22nd Iris Uruguay Awards =

23rd Iris Uruguay Awards
- Date: April 2, 2017
- Location: Radisson Victoria Plaza, Montevideo
- Presented by: Diario El País
- Most awards: Television: Canal 10, Teledoce (5)
- Most nominations: Television: Canal 10 (20); Radio: Océano FM (6)

Television/radio coverage
- Network: Canal 10, Canal 4, Teledoce, VTV

The 22nd Iris Awards ceremony, presented by the newspaper El País, honored the best of radio, television and social networks in Uruguay of 2016 and took place at the Radisson Montevideo Victoria Plaza Hotel, Montevideo. It was held on April 2, 2017, and was broadcast by Teledoce, Canal 4, Canal 10 and VTV. The ceremony did not have a single host, but different presenters hosted it for a certain time, thus fulfilling a time for the channel that transmitted the event.

During the ceremony, El País presented Iris Awards to television in 17 categories, and to radio in 7. It also presented the Golden Iris Award, the Iris for Career and the Platinum Iris.

== Winners and nominees ==
=== Television ===
Best Journalism	Best Comedy Program
Santo y seña (Canal 4); Código país (Teledoce); En la mira (VTV)	Sonríe, te estamos grabando (Teledoce); Sé lo que viste (Canal 4); Bendita TV (Canal 10)
Best Magazine	Best TV Documentary
Desayunos informales (Teledoce); Buen Día Uruguay (Canal 4); La mañana en casa (Canal 10)	Uruguayos en el mundo (Canal 10); Cámara testigo (Teledoce); Fanáticos (VTV)
Best Newscast	Best Entertainment Program
Subrayado (Canal 10); Telemundo (Teledoce); Telenoche (Canal 4)	Escape perfecto (Canal 10); Después vemos (TV Ciudad); Agitando una más (Canal 4)
Best General Interest Program	Best General Interest Program
Consentidas (Canal 10); Esta boca es mía (Teledoce); Algo contigo (Canal 4)	Esta boca es mía (Teledoce); Consentidas (Canal 10); Algo contigo (Canal 4)
Best Sports Program	Best Production
Pasión (VTV); Fox Sports Radio (Fox Sports); Punto Penal (Canal 10)	El origen (Teledoce); Escape perfecto (Canal 10); Esta boca es mía (Teledoce); Maybelline Model (Canal 4); Por la camiseta (Canal 10)
Best Male Presenter	Best Female Presenter
Alejandro Figueredo (for Desayunos informales - Teledoce); Luis Alberto Carballo (for Algo contigo - Canal 4); Jorge Piñeyrúa (for Bendita TV - Canal 10); Jorge Echagüe (for Pasión de Carnaval - VTV); Alberto Sonsol (for Escape Perfecto - Canal 10)	Victoria Rodríguez (for Esta boca es mía - Teledoce); Claudia Fernández (for Bendita TV - Canal 10); Soledad Ortega (for Buen Día Uruguay - Canal 4); Catalina Ferrand (for Día a Dia - VTV); Karina Vignola (for Púmbate - Canal 10)
Best Newscaster	Best Reporter
Daniel Castro (for Telenoche - Canal 4); María Noel Marrone (for Desayunos Informales - Teledoce); Ignacio Álvarez (for Santo y seña - Canal 4); Aldo Silva (for Telemundo - Teledoce); Blanca Rodríguez (for Subrayado - Canal 4)	Giannina Silva (for Algo contigo - Canal 4); Verónica Piñeyrúa (for Bendita TV - Canal 10); Martina Graf (for Desayunos informales - Teledoce); Marianela Lugano (for Buen día Uruguay - Canal 4); Daniel Banchero (for La previa - Pasión - VTV)
Best Panelist	Best Revelation
Marcelo Tejera (for Fox Sports Radio - Fox Sports); Yessy López (for Pasión de carnaval - VTV); Fernando Invernizzi (for Algo contigo - Canal 4); José Mastandrea (for Sin límite - VTV); Eleonora Navatta (for Esta boca es mía - Teledoce)	Karina Dalmás (for Telenoche - Canal 4); Martín Rodríguez (for La mañana en casa - Canal 10); Sebastián González (for Desayunos informales - Teledoce); Gustavo “Gucci” Serafini (for Púmbate - Canal 10); Aldo Cauteruccio (for Picala - Channel 4)
Best Humorous Work
Gaspar Valverde (for Púmbate - Canal 10); Diego Delgrossi (for Consentidas - Canal 10); Marcel Keoroglian (for Desayunos informales - Teledoce); Petru Valensky (for La mañana en casa - Canal 10); Pablo Fabregat (for Sonríe, te estamos grabando - Teledoce)

=== Radio ===
Best Journalism	Best General Interest Program
Hora de cierre (Sarandí); Las cosas en su sitio (Sarandí); No toquen nada (Del Sol); En perspectiva (Oriental)	Abrepalabra (Océano FM); El tren de la noche (Monte Carlo); Suena tremendo (El espectador); Viva la tarde (Sarandí)
Best Comedy Program	Best Host
Locos por el fútbol (Del Sol); Segunda pelota (Catorce 10); Malos Pensamientos (Azul); Café Express (La Ley)	Orlando Petinatti (for Malos Pensamientos - Azul); Gustavo Rey (for Abrepalabra - Océano FM); Yisela Moreira (for En buenas manos - Oldies); Ignacio Álvarez (for Las cosas en su sitio - Sarandí); Daniel Figares (for Rompekbzas - El espectador)
Best Humorous Work	Best Sportscaster
Florencia Infante (for Segunda pelota - Catorce 10); Paul Fernández (for Algo no anda bien - Catorce 10); Gustaf (for Las cosas en su sitio - Sarandí); Marcel Keoroglian "Montelongo"(for Las cosas en su sitio - Sarandí); Carlos Tanco (for No toquen nada - Océano)	Alberto Sonsol (Sport 890); Alberto Kesman (Universal); Carlos Muñoz (Nacional); Julio Ríos (Carve); Javier Máximo Goñi (Oriental)
Best Commentator
Martín Charquero (Sport 890); Federico Buysan (Sport 890); Jorge Da Silveira (Carve); Ricardo Piñeyrúa (El espectador); Damián Herrera (Nacional)

=== Other awards ===
Public Iris Award	Iris Award for Career
Victoria Rodríguez	Rubén Rada
Platinum Iris Award
Natalia Oreiro
