= Sergio Gorzy =

Uruguayan sports journalist

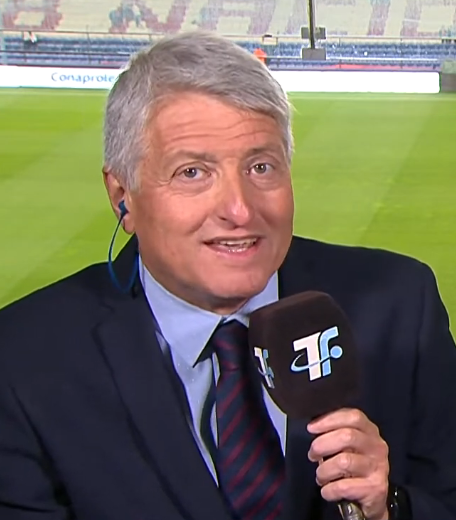
- Gorzy in 2022
- Born: Sergio Gorzyczanski Jones; June 14, 1958 (age 68); Montevideo, Uruguay
- Occupations: Sports journalist; sportscaster; television presenter; broadcaster
- Children: 1

Sergio Gorzyczanski Jones (born 14 June 1958) is a Uruguayan sports journalist, sportscaster and television presenter.

With an extensive career, since the mid-1970s Gorzy has hosted numerous sports and variety shows on radio and television, including Pasión, La Hora de los Deportes and Cámara Celeste. As a sports journalist he has covered every edition of the FIFA World Cup since 1978. He has also ventured into acting. From 2014 to 2016 he served as president of the Central Israelite Committee of Uruguay, the main organization of the country's Jewish community.

== Early life ==
Sergio Gorzyczanski Jones was born on June 14, 1965, at the Italian Hospital in Montevideo, the son of Berta Jones and Israel "Julio" Gorzyczanski, both hoteliers and travel agents. From a Jewish family, his father —a Polish Jew— was born in Warsaw, and emigrated to Uruguay as a baby in 1930 with his parents. His mother was the daughter of Jewish Lithuanian immigrants who arrived in the country in the 1920s.

Raised in the Palermo neighborhood, he attended the Escuela Integral Hebreo-Uruguaya, an educational center with Jewish religious affiliation. He was also part of the Zionist youth movement Jazit Hanoar. After graduating from high school he enrolled at the University of the Republic to study business administration, but did not finish his degree.

== Career ==
In his youth he worked in his family's travel agency. He began her media career at age 18 as a radio production assistant. Shortly after he started in sports journalism. In 1978 he was accredited to the FIFA World Cup, and since then he has attended all editions working for the Uruguayan media.

In the 1980s he worked as a columnist in the newspaper El País, and in various radio programs. In 1991 he began to co-present with other journalists the National Television sports program, La Hora de los Deportes. His participation gave him wide recognition from the public. In 1993 he joined Teledoce to be part of the sports news program Polideportivo 12.

In 1994 he left Teledoce and joined the cable television channel TyC Sports Uruguay —Uruguayan division of TyC Sports— to host TyC en la Cancha, a program that summarized soccer matches, after the channel bought the exclusive rights to the Uruguayan soccer divisions. In 1997 he began co-hosting the program Usted que opina on Sport 890, which as of 2023 has 27 seasons. When Tenfield was created at the end of 1998 and acquired the marketing rights for Uruguayan soccer, Gorzy became part of its journalistic team. He hosted the debate program Pasión, which was awarded the Iris Award for best sports program on television on several occasions.

In February 2003 he began hosting the daytime program Buscadores on the National Television. In December 2005 he joined Tenfield's show Verano a la Carta produced every summer season in the seaside city of Punta del Este. In 2007, Gorzy released Cámara Celeste, a travel documentary that follows the national football team and Uruguayan athletes in international tournaments. Since then, he has reported on every FIFA World Cup, Copa America and Olympic Games.

From 2011 to 2013 he was part of the staff of the Channel 10 program, Punto Penal, and from 2013 to 2015 he co-hosted Cortita y al pie alongside Alberto Sonsol. In 2015 he made his theater debut in the play Pato a la Naranja.

In November 2018 he joined the Channel 4 news program Telenoche, as co-host of the sports segment. That year he was cast in the comedy play Más hundidos que nunca, along with other television personalities and comedians. Since 2019 he has hosted El Diario del Fútbol on Channel 4. In June 2026, he was announced as the host of the new Uruguayan version of the game show Raid the Cage, which had previously been adapted between 2014 and 2020 by Channel 10 and hosted by Alberto Sonsol.

He has also published books related to the Uruguay national football team and notable figures in Uruguayan football, both individually and in collaboration with other authors.

== Personal life ==
Gorzy has a daughter, Melina (b. 1993), a psychologist and actress. He is in a relationship with Marcela Bonomi Gatti. He belongs to the Nueva Congregación Israelita (NCI).

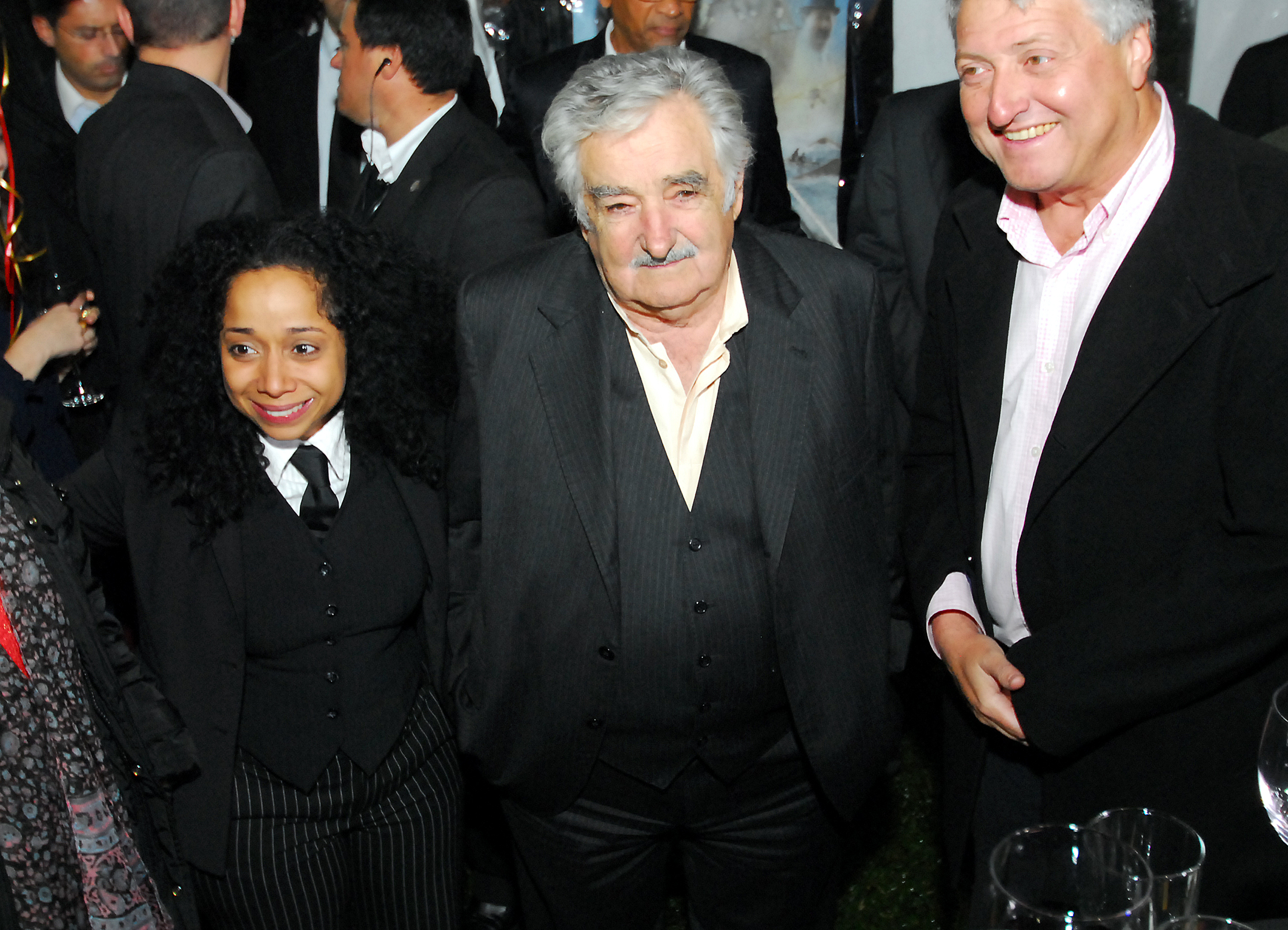
Gorzy (right) with U.S. ambassador Julissa Reynoso and President José Mujica

In 2014 he was appointed president of the Central Israelite Committee of Uruguay, the organization that brings together all the Jewish communities and associations in the country. He served in the position for a two-year period, being succeeded by Israel Buszkaniec in 2016.

== Other works ==
- Cámara Celeste, en Sudáfrica, y al final jugamos los 7 partidos (2010) ISBN 9789974828308
- Cámara Celeste, Copa América 2011, 15 gritos, junto a Atilio Garrido (2010) ISBN 9789974831742
- Forlán familia de Campeones (2019) ISBN 9789974483163
- Carlos Solé detrás del mito : tupamaros, fútbol y radio (2021) ISBN 9789915403076
