= Clara Berenbau =

Uruguayan presenter, announcer, actress, and journalist

- Born: María Clara Berenbau Giuria; 7 November 1980; Montevideo, Uruguay
- Died: 24 April 2013 (aged 32); Montevideo, Uruguay
- Other name: Clarita Berenbau
- Occupations: Presenter, announcer, columnist, actress, writer, journalist
- Spouse: Daniel Yaquinta
- Children: 2
- Awards: Iris Award
- Website: www.claritaberenbau.com

María Clara Berenbau Giuria (7 November 1980 – 24 April 2013), also known as Clarita Berenbau, was a Uruguayan presenter, announcer, columnist, actress, writer, and journalist.

== Biography ==
Clara Berenbau was born in Montevideo on 7 November 1980. In 2005, she married Daniel "Cuqui" Yaquinta at the La Candelaria Church in Punta del Este. They became parents of two children on 24 April 2012, Salvador and Guadalupe.

Berenbau worked in television and hosted the program Vamos on Teledoce, as well as Cuatro Estaciones and Tiempo de Campo on Channel 5. She was a columnist for shows on the TV programs Hola Vecinos and Arriba Gente on Channel 10. On the radio she hosted Viva la Tarde. In theater she starred in the play Estoy sola porque quiero.

In 2007 she was diagnosed with breast cancer. Berenbau died in Montevideo on 24 April 2013, at age 32.

== Awards ==
- 2007 and 2010 – Iris Award for most elegant
- 2012 – Iris Award for best radio host

== Book ==
In 2011, Berenbau published the autobiography Vivir con él (Palabra Santa, ISBN 9789974830813) detailing her struggle with cancer. She was writing a second book at the time of her death.
