= Iris Award (Uruguay) =

Uruguayan award

- Current: 23rd Iris Awards (Uruguay)
- Awarded for: Excellence in radio, television and social networks
- Country: Uruguay
- Presented by: El País
- First award: 1983
- Website: premiosiris.com.uy

Television/radio coverage
- Network: Teledoce, Channel 4, Channel 10

The Iris Awards (Spanish: Premios Iris), created by the newspaper El País, are given for achievements in Uruguayan radio, television and social networks.

== History ==
The first edition of the awards was in 1983, although they were not given again until 1995. Since then they have been delivered annually. There are more than 30 categories, among which the Golden Iris (Spanish: Premio Iris de Oro) is most prominent. The awards are given by the newspaper El País and disseminated by its entertainment supplement Sábado Show.

The trophy's shape is based on a human figure holding an eye with a square iris. Depending on the profession of the person who won it, a different silhouette appears under the figure's feet – a film reel, musical note, etc.

Since 2010, the ceremony has been broadcast live on television throughout Uruguay.

Currently some categories can be voted on by the public.

== Television broadcast ==
Year	Channel	Hosts
2010	Teledoce	Victoria Rodríguez and Rafael Villanueva
2011	Saeta TV	Jorge Carlos Piñeyrua and Noelia Campo
2012	Monte Carlo TV	Luis Alberto Carballo, Adriana da Silva, Sara Perrone, and Leonardo Lorenzo
2013	Teledoce Saeta TV Monte Carlo TV VTV	
2014	Teledoce Saeta TV Monte Carlo TV VTV	
2015	Teledoce Saeta TV Monte Carlo TV VTV	
2016	Teledoce Saeta TV Monte Carlo TV VTV	
2017	Teledoce Saeta TV Monte Carlo TV VTV	

== Golden Iris Award ==
Year	Winner	For	Medium
1995	Federico García Vigil	Music	
1996	Antonio Larreta	Writing	
1997	Rubén Rada	Music	
1998	Alberto Kesman	Estadio Uno sports journalism	Canal 5
1999	Néber Araújo	Telemundo 12	Canal 12
2000	China Zorrilla	Acting	
2001			
2002	25 Watts	Film directed by Pablo Stoll	
2003	Omar Varela	La bien pagá (play)	
2004			
2005	Whisky	Film directed by Pablo Stoll	
2006	Vidas	General interest show, Facundo Ponce de León	Teledoce
2007	Zona urbana	News show presented by Ignacio Álvarez	Channel 10
2008	El baño del papa	Film by César Charlone and Enrique Fernández	
2009	Esta boca es mia	General interest show presented by Victoria Rodríguez	Teledoce
2010	Jorge Carlos Piñeyrua	Bendita TV (archive program) hosted by Jorge Carlos Piñeyrua and Claudia Fernández	Channel 10
2011	Ignacio Álvarez	Las cosas en su sitio (news radio)	Radio Sarandí
2012	Jorge Esmoris	Artigas. La Redota (film)	
2013	Bendita TV	Presented by Jorge Carlos Piñeyrua and Claudia Fernández	Channel 10
2014	Maximiliano de la Cruz	Acting, humor, TV hosting	Teledoce
2016	Alberto Sonsol	TV hosting and sports journalism	Channel 10
2017	Victoria Rodríguez	TV host	Teledoce
2018	MasterChef Uruguay	Competitive cooking game show	Channel 10

== Other awards ==
=== 2016 ===
The following categories were awarded at the 2016 Iris Awards, for 2015 programs:

Category	Winner	Medium
Best Humorous Work in Television	Marcel Keoroglian	Canal 12
Best TV Documentary	Cámara Testigo	Canal 12
Best TV Information Program	Telenoche	Monte Carlo TV
Best TV Sports	Punto Penal	Saeta TV
Best Radio Hosting	Orlando Petinatti	Azul FM 101.9
Best Sports Commentary	Federico Buysan	
Best General Interest Radio Program	Viva la tarde	Sarandi 690
Best Radio Reporter	Alberto Kesman	
Best TV Panelist	Washington Abdala	Canal 12
Best TV Journalism	Santo y Seña	Monte Carlo TV
Best Magazine	Desayunos Informales	Canal 12
Career Award	Sergio Puglia	
Iris Revelation Award	Verónica Piñeyrúa	Saeta TV
Best TV Testimonial	Fanáticos	VTV
Best Radio Humor	Segunda Pelota	FM del Sol
Best Entertainment Program	Escape perfecto	Saeta TV
Best Humorous TV Program	Sé lo que Viste	Monte Carlo TV
Best News Host	Fernando Vilar	Monte Carlo TV
Best Humorous Radio Personality	Darwin Desbocatti	
Best Female Host	Claudia Fernández	Saeta TV
Public Iris	Ariel Pérez	
Best General Interest Program	Esta Boca es Mía	Canal 12
Best Radio Journalism	En Perspectiva	
Best Male Host	Alberto Sonsol	Saeta TV
Best Integral TV Production	El Origen	Canal 12
Best Program of Shows	Algo Contigo	Monte Carlo TV

=== 2017 ===
The following categories were awarded at the 2017 Iris Awards, for 2016 programs:

2017
Category	Winner	Medium
Best TV Documentary	Uruguayos en el mundo	Saeta TV
Best General Interest Radio Program	Abrepalabra	Océano FM
Best TV News	Subrayado	Saeta TV
Best TV Reporter	Giannina Silva	Monte Carlo TV
Best TV Revelation	Karina Dalmás	Monte Carlo TV
Platinum Iris	Natalia Oreiro	
Best Radio Host	Orlando Petinatti	Azul FM
Best TV Panelist	Marcelo Tejera	Fox Sports
Best TV Humor	Sonríe, te estamos grabando	Teledoce
Best TV Journalism	Santo y seña	Monte Carlo TV
Best Humorous Work in Radio	Florencia Infante	Oceano FM
Career Iris	Rubén Rada	
Best Radio Humor	Locos x el fútbol	La Catorce Diez
Best TV Entertainment Program	Escape perfecto	Saeta TV
Best News Hosting and/or Journalism	Daniel Castro	Monte Carlo TV
Best TV Magazine	Desayunos informales	Teledoce
Special Iris	Artistic inauguration of the Estadio Campeón del Siglo	
Best TV Sports	Pasión	VTV
Best Radio Journalism	Hora de cierre	Sarandi AM
Best Radio Commentary	Martín Charquero	
Best Humorous Work in Television	Gaspar Valverde	Saeta TV
Best TV Production	El origen	Teledoce
Best Radio Reporter	Alberto Sonsol	
Best General Interest TV Program	Consentidas	Saeta TV
Best Male TV Host	Alejandro Figueredo	Teledoce
Best Web Revelation	Dos Bros	YouTube
Best Female TV Host	Victoria Rodríguez	Teledoce
Public Iris	Café Express	La Ley FM

== See also ==
- Iris Award (disambiguation)
- Latin American television awards
