= Jorge Traverso =

Jorge Traverso may refer to:

- Jorge Traverso (footballer) (born 1947), Argentine footballer
- Jorge Traverso (journalist) (1945–2025), Uruguayan journalist and anchor
