= Blanca Rodríguez (journalist) =

Uruguayan journalist and politician

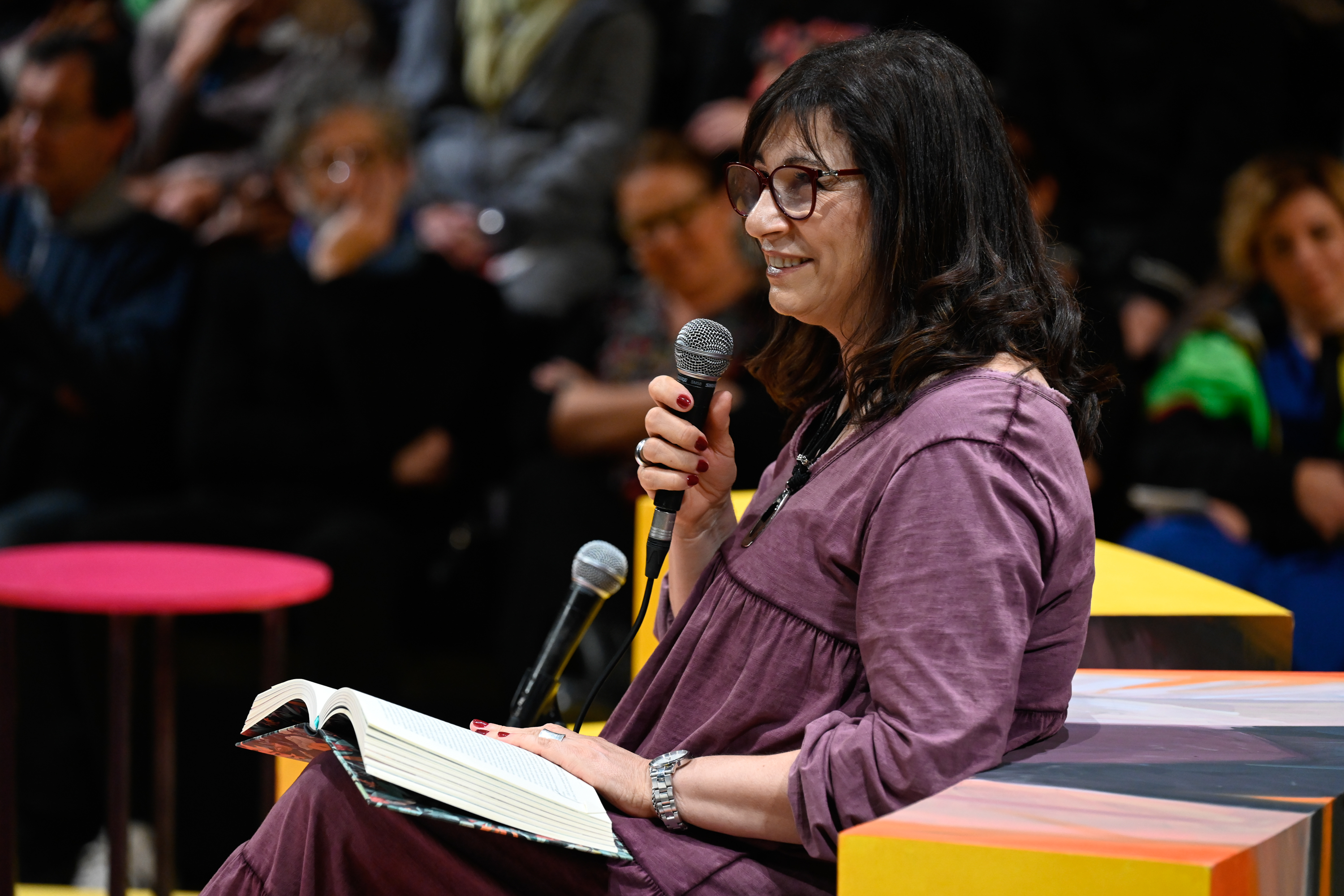
- Rodríguez in 2025

Senator of the Republic
- Incumbent
- Assumed office February 15, 2025

Personal details
- Born: Blanca Isabel Rodríguez González; 13 April 1959 (age 67) Montevideo, Uruguay
- Party: Broad Front
- Children: 3
- Education: Instituto de Profesores Artigas
- Occupation: Newsreader; teacher; politician

Blanca Isabel Rodríguez González (born 13 April 1959) is a Uruguayan journalist, newsreader, teacher and politician. She was the anchor of Channel 10's Subrayado newscast from 1990 to 2024. In the 2024 general election, she was elected Senator of the Republic for the Broad Front for the 50th Legislature.

== Biography ==
Blanca Rodríguez was born in Montevideo on 13 April 1959, and was educated at the Artigas Institute for Teacher Education where she graduated as a literature teacher. She began her career as an anchorperson in 1988. She went on to co-host Canal 10's central newscast, Subrayado, with Jorge Traverso from 1990 to 2013. After Traverso left the central edition of Subrayado after 23 uninterrupted years, on 22 February 2013, Rodríguez remained at the forefront of the newscast. She has created several journalistic series on television and radio, which led her to interview prominent national and international personalities. She is the author of several books based on her own research and interviews.

March 2008 marked the 20th anniversary of her debut on Subrayado. In March 2010, she became longest-serving Uruguayan news host, having worked continuously since 1988.

She has received numerous honors throughout her career, including the Woman of the Year Award, organized annually in Uruguay to recognize and promote Uruguayan women in various fields.

== Political career ==
In August 2024, her incorporation into the leftist Movement of Popular Participation, a constituent party of the Broad Front, was announced. Former President José Mujica and former First Lady Lucía Topolansky were present at the press conference announcing her joining the party. She was also confirmed as a candidate for the Senate in second place on the Lista 609 electoral list .

== Private life ==
She was the romantic partner of economist and politician Mario Bergara, a candidate for the Broad Front in the 2019 primaries. Rodríguez's name was mentioned to complete a presidential ticket. She has three children.

== Books ==
- Confidencias (1998), Cal y Canto
- Mujeres uruguayas (1999), Alfaguara, ISBN 9789974903807, various authors
- El correo del general (2004), Aguilar, ISBN 9789974671973, compilation
- Ministras (2010), Aguilar, ISBN 9789974953666
