= Alberto Sonsol =

Uruguayan journalist (1957–2021)

- Born: Alberto Sonsol Cohen; November 26, 1957; Montevideo, Uruguay
- Died: March 25, 2021 (aged 63); Montevideo, Uruguay
- Resting place: Israelite Cemetery of La Paz
- Occupations: Sports journalist; sportscaster; television presenter; broadcaster
- Spouse: Patricia Datz
- Children: 3

Alberto Sonsol Cohen (November 26, 1957 – March 25, 2021) was a Uruguayan sports journalist, sportscaster and television presenter.

== Early life ==
Alberto Sonsol was born on 26 November 1957 in the Palermo neighbourhood of Montevideo, to David Sonsol and Leonor Cohen, both of Jewish descent. His paternal grandfather, an Ashkenazi Jew whose surname was Schonsho, was the first member of the family to arrive in Uruguay; the surname was reportedly misrecorded by a customs official upon his arrival and thereafter remained Sonsol.

Sonsol attended the Instituto Yavne. In January 1984, he emigrated to Israel, where he worked as a waiter in an Argentine restaurant in Tel Aviv. Later that same year, however, he returned to Uruguay, where he began working as a sports journalist.

== Career ==
He began his career as a basketball announcer in 1984. A year later he reported his first full match for Radio Universal. Since the 1990s, he was a panelist on the program La Hora de los Deportes aired on National Television. However, during his 35 years in the media, he hosted the program 6.25 Basketball on Teledoce, and until 2017 he was a sports journalist and was in charge of sports commentary on Radio Sarandí Sport 890.

From 2015 to 2020 he presented the Uruguayan version of the Israeli format Raid the Cage, entitled Escape perfecto and aired on Channel 10. He was accompanied by Annasofía Facello, who also co-presented the spin-off featuring celebrities, along with Claudia Fernández. From 2020 until his death, he was part of Punto Penal and the Polémica en el bar Uruguay program panel. He also was the presenter of the sports section in Subrayado, the news division of Channel 10.

From February 2021 until his death, he was part of the cast of the comedy programme La Peluquería de Don Mateo. Following his death, he was replaced by Sebastián Almada.

== Accolades ==
- 2016: Golden Iris Award and Best Male TV Presenter
- 2017: Iris Award for best radio sportscaster

== Personal life ==
He was married to Patricia Datz, with whom he had three children: Diego, Alejandro and Micaela Sonsol. Alejandro "Lali" and Diego also work in the media, as sportscasters and presenters.

=== Death ===
On March 12, 2021, it was announced that he had contracted COVID-19. On March 16, he was hospitalized at the British Hospital of Montevideo, after a low level of oxygen was detected in his blood, and four days later he was transferred to the ICU due to worsening symptoms. He died on March 25, 2021, at the age of 63. He was buried on April 2 in the Israelite Cemetery of La Paz. Due to the restrictions due to the pandemic, a funeral was not held, but a funeral procession was held from Club Atlético Atenas, of which Sonsol was a supporter, to the Centenario Stadium.
