= Traverso (disambiguation) =

Traverso, a.k.a. baroque flute, indicates the baroque to mid 19-century wooden transverse flute that preceded the Western concert flute.

Traverso may also indicate:

- transverse flute, English translation of the Italian word traverso
- Giovanni Battista Traverso (1878–1959), Italian mycologist
- Jorge Traverso (footballer) (born 1947), Argentine footballer
- Jorge Traverso (journalist) (1945–2025), Uruguayan journalist and anchor
- Juan María Traverso (1950–2024), Argentine racing driver
- SOB Traverso, a passenger articulated trainset operated by the Swiss Südostbahn (SOB)
