= La ruleta de la suerte (Uruguayan game show) =

- Genre: Game show
- Based on: Wheel of Fortune
- Developed by: Gustavo Landivar
- Directed by: Diego García Scheck
- Presented by: Rafael Villanueva; Roxanne Machin
- Country of origin: Uruguay

Production
- Executive producer: Alejandra Borques
- Producers: Rodrigo Higuimaran; Andrés González; María Eugenia Ugarte; Julián Pintos
- Production locations: Teledoce Headquarters, Montevideo
- Running time: 60 minutes
- Production companies: Sony Pictures Television; ViacomCBS Global Distribution

Original release
- Network: Teledoce
- Release: 11 August 2020 – 1 March 2022

La ruleta de la suerte is an Uruguayan television game show based on the original American series Wheel of Fortune. Presented by Rafael Villanueva and Roxanne Machin, it is broadcast on Teledoce. The show debuted on 11 August 2020, and its first episode was the fourth most viewed of the day, reaching 10.9 rating points. It airs on Tuesdays and Thursdays at 9 p.m.

In each episode, three participants face different blank word puzzles; they must choose consonants and buy vowels to solve common sayings and phrases. In this way, they manage to accumulate prizes to be able to win a 0KM car.

== Production ==
Initially, the show was going to be presented by Fernando Vilar, who had been summoned to host an entertainment program for the first time. However, after participating in the rehearsals with the scenography prepared, he decided to abandon the project, arguing that he "did not measure up" to such a challenge. Finally, Rafael Villanueva was chosen to host the program.

As part of the advertising campaign for the show, on the morning of the debut day, the Desayunos informales team was invited to test the game on the set.

== Ratings ==
Episode	Date	Viewing figures	Position	Rfs.
1	11 August 2020	10,9	Fourth	
2	13 August 2020	9,85	Fifth	
