= Semanario Hebreo =

Uruguayan newspaper

- Type: weekly newspaper
- Founded: 1960
- Headquarters: Montevideo, Uruguay
- Website: Semanario Hebreo

Semanario Hebreo (Hebrew Weekly) is a Spanish-language Jewish weekly newspaper published in Montevideo, Uruguay.

It was founded in 1960 by José Jerozolimski, a Polish Jewish immigrant to Uruguay.

== History ==
Semanario Hebreo originally served as the newsletter of the Uruguayan Zionist Youth Federation, with opinion pieces by Jewish youth. The first directors were Raúl Blusztein and Luis Skudzicki and José Jerozolimski served as Editor-in-Chief. Due to a lack of advertising money, the newsletter soon closed.

Jerozolimski relaunched the publication in 1960, and it exists to this day. Semanario Hebreo was part of a larger project on Jewish media in Uruguay, including the radio program Voz de Sión del Uruguay and the Canal 10 program Amistad de Uruguay-Israel, both created and directed by Jerozolimski until his death in Jerusalem in 2004.

In July 2000, Jerozolimski was awarded the "Prize for Jewish Intellectual Merit" by the Latin American Jewish Congress.

After José Jerozolimski's death in 2004, journalist Ana Jerozolimski (known outside Uruguay as Jana Beris) took over control of the newsroom.

In December 2018 the newspaper merged its digital operations with the JAI portal, creating a new internet portal called Semanario Hebreo Jai.

== Bibliography ==
- Nemirovsky, Israel. Albores del judaísmo en el Uruguay. Montevideo: edición del autor, 1987. Depósito Legal 218.554/87.
