= Fede Vigevani =

Uruguayan YouTuber and musician (born 1994/95)

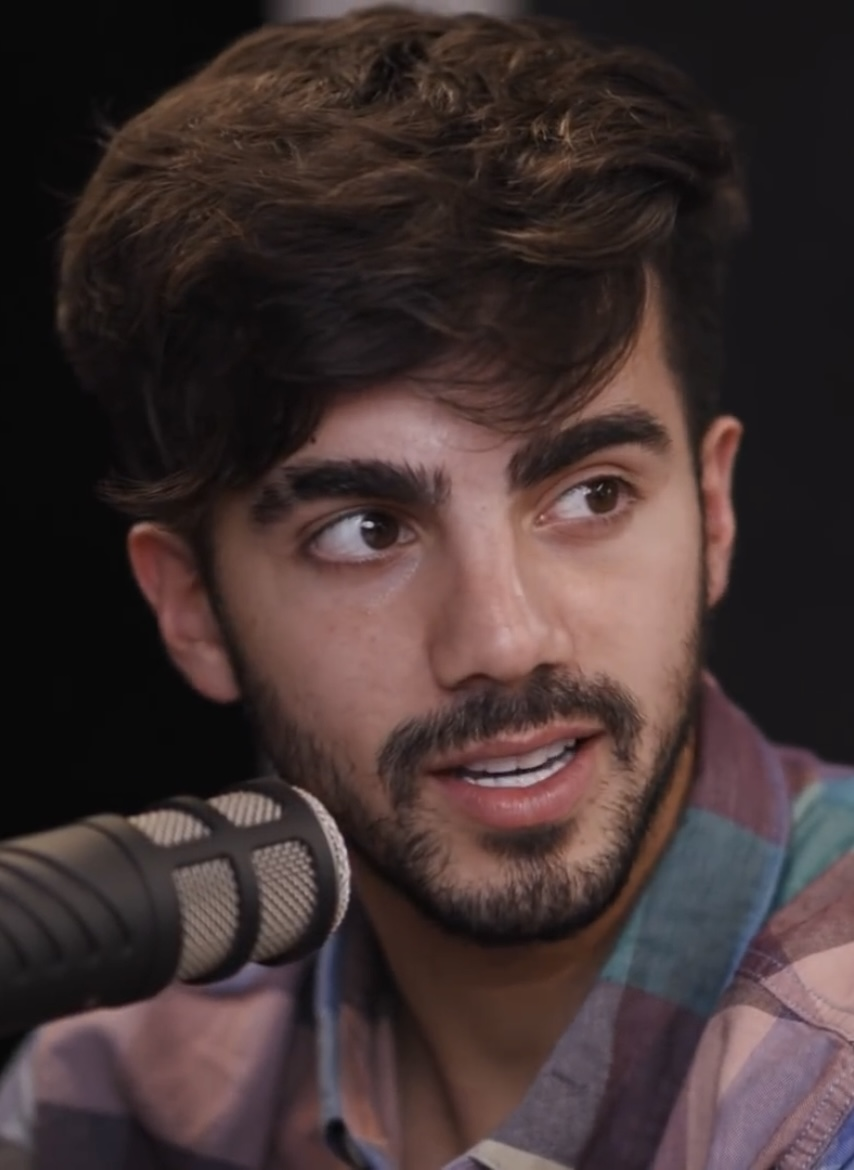
- Vigevani in 2021
- Born: Federico Augusto Vigevani de Arce; October 1, 1994 (age 32); Montevideo, Uruguay
- Citizenship: Uruguay; Mexico
- Occupations: YouTuber; musician

YouTube information
- Channel: Fede Vigevani
- Years active: 2009–present
- Genres: Entertainment; music; vlog
- Subscribers: 78.3 million
- Views: 28.5 billion
- Musical career
- Genre: Pop music
- Years active: 2018–present
- Last updated: 7 September 2026

Federico Augusto Vigevani de Arce (born 1 October 1994), also known mononymously as Fede, is a Uruguayan YouTuber and musician. As of June 2026, he has the 38th biggest YouTube channel in the world with over 76 million subscribers. From 2014 to 2018, he was a member of the YouTube group Dosogas.

== Early life ==
Federico Augusto Vigevani de Arce was born on 1 October 1994 in Montevideo, the youngest of the three children – Agustina and Fabrizio – and the second son of Guillermo Vigevani and Sylvia de Arce; his parents divorced when he was five years old, after which he divided his time between his mother's home in the Montevideo neighborhood of Malvín Norte and his father's residence in the coastal town of Solymar, in the Canelones Department. Of Italian descent, Vigevani majored in graphic design. He uploaded his first video, titled “La Mejor Joda Por Celular! (Excelente),” in June 2009 at the age of 14. Vigevani began uploading regularly in 2014, and soon after released his first viral video, in which he used his mother's red nail polish to create art.

== Career ==
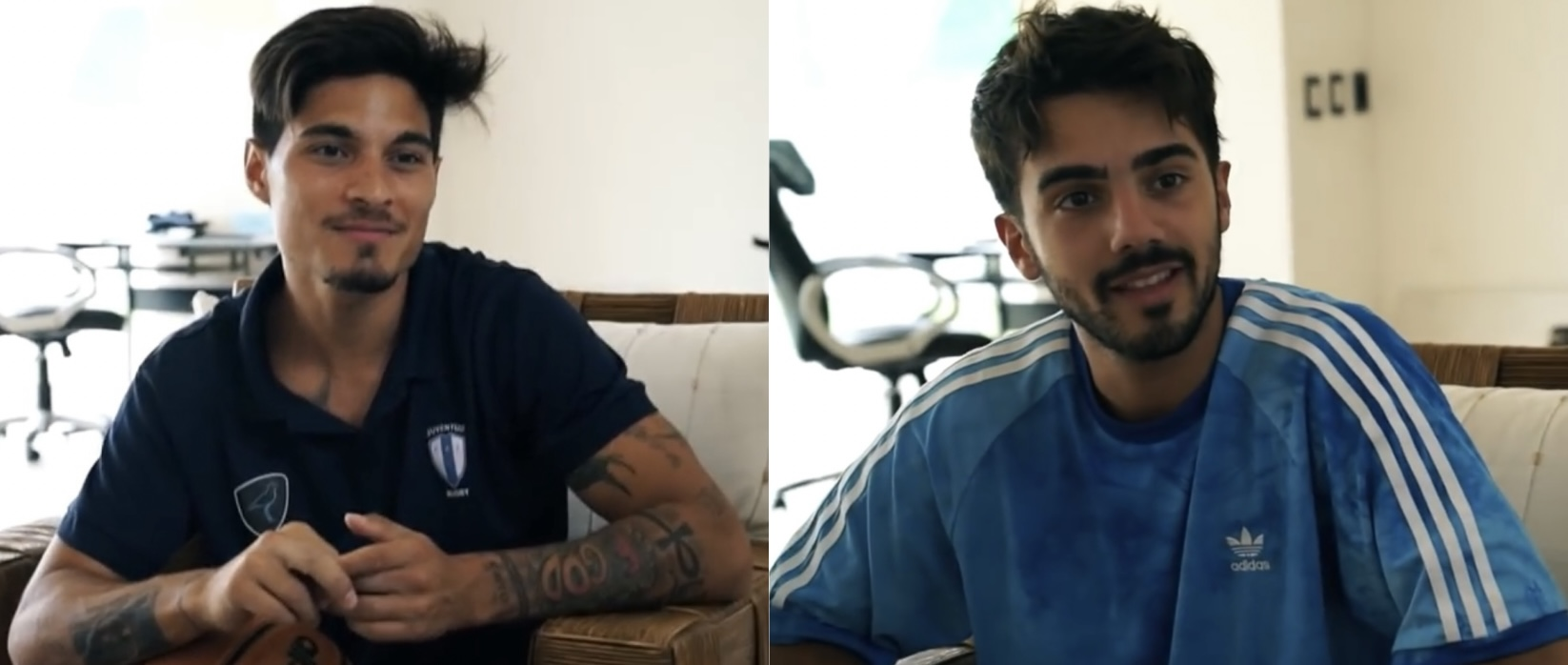
Sellanes (left) and Vigevani (right) in 2018

In June 2014, he created the YouTube channel “Dosogas” —a portmanteau of dos sogas, Spanish for “two ropes”, a nickname the group used— together with his friends Mathías Sellanes and Juan Pablo Barbot, featuring prank videos and hidden-camera content filmed in the streets of Montevideo. Their first video, uploaded in June 2014, went viral within a few weeks, and the group quickly gained widespread popularity across Latin America. In September 2015, the group released its first musical single, “Los dos”.

In July 2016, the channel reached 100,000 subscribers, and the creators began filming videos in other cities, including Buenos Aires and Mexico City, often featuring local YouTubers. Throughout 2016, the group also performed a series of stage shows in Uruguay and Argentina. In December of that year, Barbot left the group.

In 2017, the channel shifted its focus toward vlog-based content. During this period, the creators formed the Mexico City-based “Dosogas Team,” which included several other internet personalities. The group disbanded in October 2018 due to internal disagreements, with multiple creators accusing Sellanes of being “a bad person". That same year, Vigevani was nominated for “Influencer of the Year” at the 23rd Iris Awards.

=== Solo and music career ===
In 2018, he released his first solo single "Te Encontré", which was described by Ana Laura García of Ovaciones as merging "pop and urban rhythms". In 2019, Vigevani and former Dosogas Team member Nicole García released the songs: "Te Quiero" and "Roast Yourself" together as "Fedecole". In March 2020, he created the "La Vecibanda", Spanish for the neighbours, which were a group of children whom he would make entertainment and music videos with such as "Hermanos De Verdad", "Ya No Tengo Novia" and "No Somos Lobos". The latter, described as his favourite song, surpassed fifty million views in less than a year after it was uploaded. After reaching ten million subscribers in 2021, he created a new version of his song "Más Que Un Fan", in which he visited his fan's homes. He has performed his songs at venues such as the Luna Park in Argentina, the Pepsi Center stadium in Mexico and the Teatro Caupolicán in Chile.

Vigevani was one of the hosts of the 2021 Kids' Choice Awards Mexico, alongside the music duo Skabeche. In 2023, his show "El mundo de Fede Vigevani" made its debut at the Summer Theater in Montevideo before being performed eight times at the Teatro Gran Rex in Buenos Aires. On 20 May 2024, Vigevani announced that he had become the most-subscribed Spanish-speaking YouTuber in a live-stream in which he jokingly stated that he wished to overtake El Reino Infantil, the Spanish-speaking channel with the most subscribers. He competed in MrBeast's video "50 YouTubers Fight for $1,000,000" in which he was eliminated after failing to cut an umbrella-shaped dalgona. On 25 April 2025, Vigevani and MrBeast hosted an influencer basketball game featuring a team of Spanish-speaking creators and a team of English-speaking creators.

== Discography ==
=== Singles ===
Title	Artist(s)	Video director(s)	Year	Ref.
"Te Encontré"	Fede, Connie Isla and Otto Bunge	—	2018	
"Te Quiero"	Fedecole	Oscar del Rey	2019	
"Arbol"	Fede Vigevani	Federico Vigevani	2019	
"Roast Yourself"	Fedecole	—	2019	
"Más Que un Fan"	Fede	Oscar del Rey	2019	
"Hermanos de Verdad"	Fede featuring Vecinos	Oscar del Rey	2020	
"Solita"	Fede, Supernovas and Kiddrodz	—	2020	
"Ya No Tengo Novia"	Fede featuring Vecinos	Federico Vigevani	2020	
"No Somos Lobos"	Fede featuring Vecinos	Oscar del Rey	2020	
"Vecinos de Verdad"	Fede featuring Vecinos	Oscar del Rey	2020	
"Full Soltera"	Reja and Fede	Diego Carrasco and Jere Lazo	2021	
"Luz"	Fede featuring G Sony	Whaire	2022	
"Que Todos Miren"	Fede featuring Vecinos	Oscar del Rey	2023	
"No Voy a Llorar Por Ti"	Ian Lucas, Fede Vigevani and Milthon	Thega Diaz	2023	
"Deep Web"	Club Misterio	Oscar del Rey	2023	
"La Definición de Perfección"	Fede Vigevani, Ian Lucas and Parcerito	Thega Diaz	2024	
"TikTok"	Ian Lucas, Fede Vigevani and Gusty DJ	Whaire	2024	

== Awards and nominations ==
Year	Award	Category	Result	Ref.
2018	Iris Awards	Influencer of the Year	Nominated	
2020	Kids' Choice Awards Mexico	Favourite Creator	Nominated	
2020	Eliot Awards	Reveal of the Year	Won	
2021	Kids' Choice Awards	Favorite Influencer (Latin America)	Won	
2021	Kids' Choice Awards Mexico	Coolest YouTuber	Won	
2022	Kids' Choice Awards	Favorite Influencer (Latin America) (Note: With the Vecibanda.)	Won	
2022	Kids' Choice Awards Mexico	Celebrity Crush	Won	
2023	Kids' Choice Awards Mexico	Favorite Duo (Note: With Ian Lucas.)	Won	
2023	Eliot Awards	Best Engager	Nominated	
2024	Kids' Choice Awards	Funniest Creator (Latin America)	Nominated	
2024	Eliot Awards	Digital Leader	Nominated	
