= Orlando Petinatti =

Uruguayan radio personality, humorist, and host

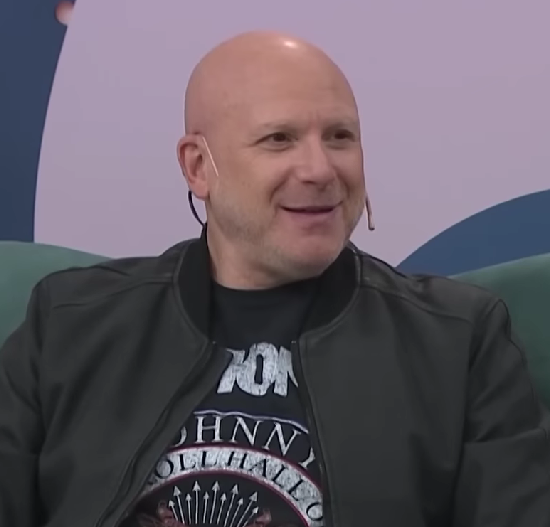
- Petinatti in 2024
- Born: Freddy Nieuchowicz Abramovich; March 30, 1968 (age 57); Montevideo, Uruguay
- Occupations: Radio personality; businessman; television presenter
- Spouse: Ethel Goldman (m. 2005; div. 2010)
- Children: Amy Nieuchowicz Goldman
- Parent(s): Aída Abramovich; Bernardo Nieuchowicz

Freddy Nieuchowicz Abramovich (born 30 March 1968), known professionally as Orlando Petinatti, is a Uruguayan radio personality, businessman, and television presenter. He is best known for hosting the radio program Malos Pensamientos since 1991, which is the program with the largest audience on radio in Uruguay.

== Early life ==
Petinatti was born in Montevideo, on March 30, 1968, to Aída Abramovich and Bernardo Nieuchowicz. His family is Jewish and descends from Lithuanian Jewish immigrants on his mother's side and Polish Jews on his father's side. He grew up in the Palermo neighborhood, and attended the Jewish Yavne Institute, where his parents worked, and was a member of the basketball team of the Hebraica Macabi.

== Career ==
=== Radio ===
His beginning in the media were in El Dorado FM 100.3, in 1987 on the radio program El Subterráneo hosted by Daniel Figares, where he played a comic character who interrupted the normal broadcast of the program. In 1991 he created the program Malos Pensamientos that was initially broadcast by Emisora del Palacio, in 1992 it began to be broadcast by CX 32 Radiomundo and lasted two hours.

From 1995 it was broadcast simultaneously by Oceano FM and CX 32 Radiomundo with a duration of three hours. The following year it was only broadcast by Oceano FM. In the same year, he also hosted another morning comedy show called Jack the Alarm Clock. Since 1994 the popularity of the program has been increasing. One of the most popular sections of the show is titled "The Hand," where the audience asks Petinatti for help solving problems on love, sexual, family, and other issues.

=== Television ===
Until 1993, he participated in El Show del Mediodía, a program hosted by Cacho de la Cruz and broadcast by Teledoce. There he portrayed various humorous characters. Years later, in 1996, he hosted a micro program called Oca's Game of the Million, also broadcast by Teledoce. He also presented the programs Wednesday Night and his successor: Mil Perdones.

Between 2003 and 2016 he annually hosted the Teletón Uruguay event. In 2005 he hosted the program Distracción broadcast on Channel 10. Later, in 2007, he hosted Mundo Cruel, a humor and entertainment program also on Channel 10.

In September 2019, it was confirmed that he would serve as a judge in Got Talent Uruguay, which premiered on 22 June 2020, on Channel 10. The other judges are María Noel Ricceto, Claudia Fernández and Agustín Casanova.

== Business ==
Petinatti is responsible for the sale of advertising in its program, both in the advertising sessions and in the program. He integrates, as managing partner, different companies from the radio and television sector, such as On Air S.R.L., Friday S.R.L., as well as companies from other areas.

== Controversies ==
In April 2016, with the leak of financial information «Panama Papers» it was revealed that he appears as president and director of the LIVINGSTONE TRADING INC. founded in 2000.
