= Ignacio Álvarez Aguerre =

Ignacio Álvarez
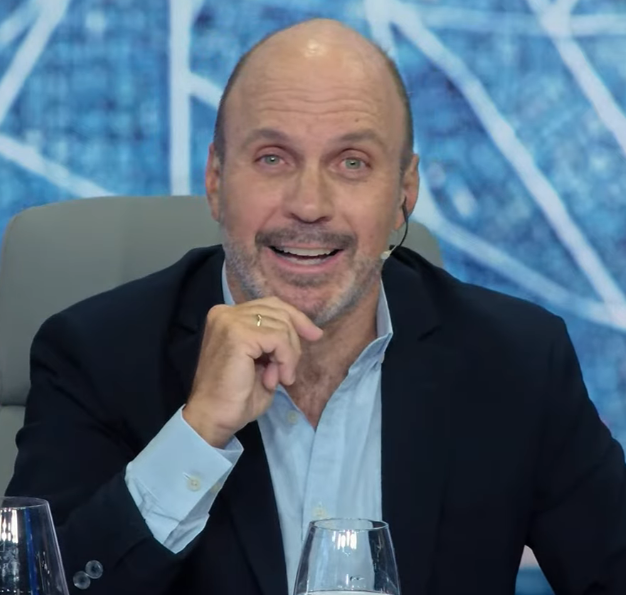
- Álvarez Aguerre in 2026
- Born: Carlos Ignacio Álvarez Aguerre; June 25, 1971 (age 55); Montevideo, Uruguay
- Education: Catholic University of Uruguay
- Occupations: Radio broadcaster; journalist; television presenter; columnist
- Years active: 1994–present
- Spouse: Natalia Petrino (m. 1999; div. 2019)
- Children: 2

Ignacio Álvarez Aguerre (born 25 June 1971) is a Uruguayan radio and television presenter, journalist and columnist. Focused on political journalism, he is known for hosting high-rating investigative television programs and for his direct style.

== Biography ==
Álvarez was born in Montevideo in 1971 to a middle-class family. His father, Jesús Álvarez, was a Spanish immigrant who had moved to Uruguay in his youth and ran a mechanic workshop until his retirement. He has two siblings: a twin brother named Bernardo and a sister named Mariana. He graduated as a social communication technician from the Catholic University of Uruguay.

He began his career in the media as a production assistant at Radio Panamericana (CX 44). In 1994, he made his debut as a presenter, co-hosting the radio program Historias de piel alongside psychologist and sexologist Rubén Campero, which aired on FM Del Plata (95.5 MHz). In 2000 he launched the morning current affairs programme Las cosas en su sitio on Radio Sarandí 690. Combining journalism and current affairs with humour segments and interviews, it became the most listened-to programme of its kind in the country and received the Iris Award for Best Radio Journalism Programme on several occasions.

Between 2003 and 2006, he hosted the current affairs programme Zona Urbana, broadcast on Channel 10, which reached high audience ratings and received the Golden Iris Award.

In February 2026, he announced his participation as host of the current affairs and news program Todo se sabe, broadcast via streaming, alongside journalists Bernardo Wolloch, Alejandro Amaral, Leonardo Pereyra, and Patricia Martín, who had been part of the team for the final season of Santo y Seña.

== Personal life ==
From 1999 to 2019, he was married to Natalia Petrino, with whom he had two children. In February 2022, he made his relationship with his girlfriend Melissa De León public, and in June 2024, they announced their engagement.

Alongside his siblings, he formed the band Los Álvarez, which performed rock and pop classics at bars throughout Montevideo.

== Filmography ==
Year	Title	Role
2003–2006	Zona urbana	Co-presenter
2012–2024	Santo y Seña	Presenter
2026–present	TTS: Todo Se Sabe	Presenter
