= Malos Pensamientos =

- Genre: Talk radio
- Running time: Weekdays: 4 hours (UTC−03:00) (3:00 pm – 7:00 pm)
- Country of origin: Uruguay
- Language(s): Spanish
- Home station: Emisora del Palacio (1991–1993); Océano FM (1994–2003); Radio Futura (2004–2009); Azul FM (2010–present)
- Hosted by: Orlando Petinatti
- Recording studio: Montevideo
- Original release: 15 April 1991
- Website: azulfm.com.uy/malos-pensamientos

Malos Pensamientos (Spanish for 'Bad thoughts') is a Uruguayan radio show hosted by Orlando Petinatti and broadcast live every weekday, from 3 p.m. to 7 p.m. (UTC−03:00) from Montevideo studios of radio station Azul F.M. Premiered on April 15, 1991, it is the most listened-to radio program in Uruguay.

With a format centered on current affairs, incorporating interviews, comedy segments, provocative topics, music, and audience commentary, it has become an integral part of the country's popular culture. It has been nominated for and awarded the Iris Award for Best Comedy Radio Program multiple times, while Petinatti himself has received the Iris Award for Best Radio Host three consecutive years.
