= Victoria Rodríguez (television presenter) =

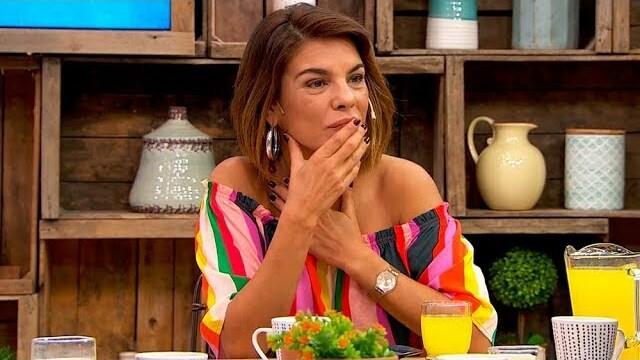
- Born: Victoria Rodríguez Arralde; December 5, 1972 (age 53); Montevideo, Uruguay
- Education: Universidad de la Republica
- Occupations: Actress, translator, television presenter, painter
- Known for: Esta boca es mía
- Children: Delfina y Víctor
- Awards: Golden Iris Award (2017)

Victoria Rodríguez Arralde (born December 5, 1972) is an Uruguayan actress, presenter, artist, translator and television figure. She is known for hosting Esta Boca es mía, a talk show broadcast by Canal 12, since 2008.

== Biography ==
Rodríguez attended Ivy Thomas Memorial School and then John XXIII Institute. In 1993 she began her activity as a television figure, hosting Oxígeno and later the program Los Viajes del Doce. In 2009 she debuted as an actress, playing the Uruguayan poet Juana de Ibarborou. That year he began to lead the new debate program, Esta boca es mía, formed by a panel and where current issues are discussed.

She is also a painter.

== Acting career ==
=== Theatre ===
Year	Title	Role	Director	Rfs.
2009	Al encuentro de las tres Marías	Juana de Ibarbourou	Álvaro Ahunchain	
2011	A Streetcar Named Desire	Blanche Du Bois	Roberto Jones	
2014	A Doll's House	Nora	Roberto Jones	
2019	Perfect Strangers		Álvaro Ahunchain	

=== Television ===
Year	Title	Role	Channel	Rfs.
2008-present	Esta boca es mía	Host	Teledoce	
2020	Referentes	Interviewer	Teledoce	
2022	¿Quién es la máscara?	Contestant; 10th Eliminated	Teledoce	

== Accolades ==
Rodríguez has won the Iris Award for Best Female Presenter twice, in 2014 and 2017, in that year she also won the Golden Iris Award.
