= Esta boca es mía =

- Genre: Talk show
- Presented by: Victoria Rodríguez
- Country of origin: Uruguay
- Original language: Spanish

Production
- Production locations: Teledoce Headquarters, Montevideo
- Running time: 105 minutes
- Production companies: Contenidos TV (2008-2017); Kubrick Media (2017-)

Original release
- Network: Teledoce; La Red
- Release: October 6, 2008 – present

Esta boca es mía (transl. This mouth is mine) is an Uruguayan daytime talk show that is broadcast on Teledoce. It debuted on October 6, 2008, and is one of the channel's longest-running current programs. It is hosted by Victoria Rodríguez and airs on weekdays from 3:00 p.m. to 5:00 p.m.

== Format ==
In each broadcast of the show, the current issues of the country are covered, such as journalistic and political issues. It has a panel of experts, special guests and a gallery of people who attend the study and can ask questions to the guests or panelists on the topics being analyzed.

== History ==
The show debuted on October 6, 2008, and initially focused on topics such as infidelity, abortion, drugs, sexuality, among others.

The presentation ceremony was held on October 7 at the Hemingway Restaurant in Montevideo. The panel was formed by Silvia Novarese, Beatriz Argimón, Julio Toyos, Lilián Abracinskas, Karina Tucuna, Damián Coalla and Daniel Lucas.

== On-air staff ==
As of February 2024, the panel is composed of Alfredo García, Conrado Hughes, Fernanda Sfeir, José Sena, Juan Rodríguez Puppo, Martha Valfre, Pablo Casas, Valeria Ripoll and Verónica Amorelli.

== Accolades ==
Esta boca es mía has won the Iris Award for the Best General Interest Program three times (2012, 2016, 2018), Victoria Rodríguez has won the category of Best Female Presenter twice (2014, 2017) and the Golden Iris Award in 2017, while Washington Abdala won the Best Panelist award in 2016. In 2009 the show was awarded the Golden Iris Award.
