= Raid the Cage =

Israeli game show

- Also known as: Kluv Hazahav
- Hebrew: כלוב הזהב
- Genre: Game show
- Created by: Shy Barmeli; Ori Dror
- Presented by: Avi Kushnir; Zvika Hadar and Eden Pines
- Country of origin: Israel
- Original language: Hebrew
- No. of seasons: 4
- No. of episodes: 35

Production
- Running time: approx. 45 minutes
- Production company: United Studios of Israel

Original release
- Network: Channel 2 (Reshet)
- Release: January 4, 2013 – June 23, 2014
- Network: Channel 13
- Release: June 19, 2025 – present

Raid the Cage or Kluv Hazahav, (Hebrew: כלוב הזהב) (Golden Cage), is an Israeli game show, where couples complete trivia and physical challenges to haul prizes from a gigantic cage before the doors slam shut. The original version aired on Channel 2 (Reshet), and hosted by Avi Kushnir. The show is distributed worldwide by Sony Pictures Television International.

== Gameplay ==
Below are the general gameplay rules used in the original version and most international versions of the show. Exact rules and challenges may vary between international versions.

A team of two contestants attempt to win as many prizes as they can from the "cage" containing various prizes. One player plays as an answerer who must answer trivia questions, the other plays as the "grabber", who is tasked with retrieving prizes from the cage.

Each question given to the answerer is a multiple-choice question with four answer choices. While answering the first nine questions, the contestants are not allowed to consult. Two lifelines are provided to the answerer, each can only be used once:

- Switch the Question: Replaces the current question with a new one, often with the same four answer choices.
- Switch Roles: The two contestants swap their roles for that question only - the grabber comes up on stage to answer the question, while the answerer grabs prizes.

Correctly answering the question will open the cage's door for a certain amount of time (10 seconds for the first question and increasing by 10 seconds after each question, up to 90 seconds), during which the grabber retrieves prizes from the cage. Some larger prizes may require completing a physical challenge before collecting, which can be accomplished over multiple runs. For each question, the grabber can enter and leave the cage only once. The grabber must be careful as there are no timekeeping devices to keep track of time, except for a warning in the last three seconds right before the door closes.

After the fifth (or any subsequent) question has been answered correctly and the grabber has safely left the cage in time, the contestants are given the option to end the game prior to seeing the next question, keeping any prizes they have collected up to that point. If an incorrect answer is given or the grabber is trapped in the cage at any point, the game ends and the contestants lose everything.

If the players successfully answer nine questions correctly and the grabber has safely left the cage in time for all nine questions, they may choose to walk away or risk their prizes to attempt the tenth and final question, in which they may confer. Correctly answering this question awards all the prizes in the cage.

== Tasks ==
Beginning from the second round, the contestants choose a big prize to play for, and the contestant who enters the cage must complete a physical challenge before being allowed to collect the big prize. Physical challenges take multiple rounds to complete, ongoing challenges can be continued in the next round if the contestant answers the next question correctly. Some great prizes in most versions include a large amount of cash, appliances, trips and vehicles, with the biggest prize usually being a brand-new car.

List of challenges in the original version, also used in some foreign versions:

- Electrical appliances: Star task – The contestant must jump on the touch screen. On every star they step on, they get a star, and on every red square they step on, they lose a star. When eight stars are collected, a stroller with Electrical appliances is freed, and the contestant can get it out of the cage.
- ATV: Hamster task – The contestant must run on a big hamster wheel to reveal a key to open the lock of the ATV and the contestant could get it out.
- Motorcycle: Safe task – The contestant to go to the strongboxes which have questions related to both team members. A correct answer opens the box and reveals the following question. which opened three safes safe third has a key to open the lock of the bike and the challenger can take it out (the same task can be performed With a diamond ring in the case of couples).
- Sailing a variety of destinations around the world: mission suitcases – The contenders take a cart and assign it the bags and take them out that has cruise.
- Car task: Superhero task – The contestant must face the screen and make flight movements to control the superhero character on the screen. Once the superhero reaches the top of the building, he/she must repeatedly make punch movements to make the superhero smashes the glass and free the first part of the car. This sequence of actions must be repeated three more times to free all four parts of the car, then the contestant is allowed to push it out of the cage. For this prize, there is usually a person sit inside to drive and turn the car to the right way.
- Bathroom task: Bubble task – The contestant must look for a bubble with a key that can open the box between all the bubbles and get the bathroom.
- Living items: Balloon task – The contestant must bounce on a seat to inflate the balloon to explode so they can take the key to open the box that awards the challenger the living room.
- Vacation abroad: Bicycle task – The contestant must ride on a bike simulator that its map simulates a section of Rome, so he/she can take a globe and win the vacation.

The tasks are varied among the broadcasting countries, for example, in the Chinese version, there is a real "Angry Birds" game in the center of the studio.

== International versions ==
Country	Title	Network	Host	Date aired
Afghanistan	فرار از قفس; Farar Az Ghafs	1TV	Mukhtar Lashkari	2017–2018
Argentina	Escape perfecto	Telefe	Leandro Leunis and Ivana Nadal; Iván de Pineda and Josefina Ansa	June 4, 2014 – March 14, 2016; November 27, 2023 – December 29, 2024
Brazil	A Fuga (part of Agora é com Datena)	Band	José Luiz Datena	April 22, 2018 – 2018
Chile	Escape perfecto	Chilevisión	Juan Pablo Queraltó	2024 (non-broadcast pilot)
China	芝麻开门; Zhima kaimen	Jiangzu TV	Zhang Chunye (On Mondays); Peng Yu (On Tuesdays)	January 22, 2013 – June 26, 2018
Colombia	Escape perfecto	RCN Televisión	Julian Román and Natalia Valenzuela	May 6, 2015 – 2015
Ecuador	Escape perfecto Ecuador	Teleamazonas	Alfonso Laso and Mara Topic	September 15, 2026 – present
Greece	Η Τέλεια Απόδραση; I Teleia Apodrasi	Alpha TV	Christos Ferendinos and Anna Prelević	April 24, 2021 – February 27, 2022
Cyprus	Η Τέλεια Απόδραση; I Teleia Apodrasi	Alpha TV Cyprus	Christos Ferendinos and Anna Prelević	April 24, 2021 – February 27, 2022
Hungary	Bezár a bazár!	TV2	Attila Till and Majka	April 9, 2018 – November 20, 2020
Israel (original version)	כלוב הזהב; Kluv Hazahav	Channel 2 Channel 13	Avi Kushnir; Zvika Hadar and Eden Pines	January 4, 2013 – June 23, 2014; June 19, 2025 – present
Italy	The Cage – Prendi e scappa	Nove	Amadeus	June 8, 2025 – May 29, 2026
Mexico	Escape perfecto	Azteca TV	Rafael Mercadante and Adianez Hernández; Marco Antonio Regil and Carlos Espejel	March 2, 2015 – 2020; April 10, 2023 – present
Paraguay	Escape perfecto	Telefuturo	Daniel Da Rosa and Lali González	June 14, 2016 – 2016
Peru	Escape perfecto	América Televisión	Marco Zunino and Sully Sáenz	April 25, 2015 – 2015
Poland	Łowcy nagród	Super Polsat	Krzysztof Ibisz and Wiktoria Gąsiewska	November 27, 2020 – December 31, 2020
Portugal	Apanha se Puderes	TVI	Cristina Ferreira and Pedro Teixeira; Rita Pereira and Pedro Teixeira	March 13, 2017 – August 24, 2019
Romania	Deschide camera comorilor	Kanal D	Liviu Vârciu	March 12, 2014 – July 31, 2017
Russia	Клетка; Kletka	Russia 1	Dmitry Guberniev	August 16, 2014 – September 27, 2014
Turkey	Kapanmadan Kazan	ATV	Murat Serezli	June 17, 2013 – July 26, 2013
Turkey	Kapanmadan Kazan	Star TV	Alp Kırşan	June 5, 2019 – September 15, 2019
Uruguay	Escape perfecto	Canal 10	Alberto Sonsol and Annasofía Facello	August 27, 2014 – June 17, 2020
Uruguay	Escape perfecto Famosos	Canal 10	Claudia Fernández and Annasofía Facello	August 27, 2014 – June 17, 2020
Uruguay	Escape perfecto Uruguay	Canal 4	Sergio Gorzy and Leticia Fernández Feijóo	August 3, 2026 – present
USA	Raid the Cage	CBS	Damon Wayans Jr. and Jeannie Mai	October 13, 2023 – June 25, 2025
Vietnam	Vừng ơi mở cửa Đào thoát	HTV7	Đại Nghĩa and Diệu Nhi	January 20, 2016 – July 13, 2016; April 10, 2018 – August 7, 2018

Note: In the Chinese edition since summer 2014, Zhang Chunye, a female 22-year-old presenter currently working for Jiangsu TV will be the host of the show's Monday edition. Zhang is also the franchise's first ever female host around the world.

In the Vietnamese edition, the show was first named Vừng ơi mở cửa, later in 2018, the show renamed Đào thoát.

=== Top prize winners ===
Here is the incomplete list of teams who successfully answered all questions correctly and won all prizes in the cage.

Country	Winning contestant(s)	Date aired
Mexico	Cris and Joe	July 26, 2023
Portugal	Dário Martins and Tiago Henriques	March 23, 2017
Portugal	Mário Gonçalves and Maria Amélia Gonçalves	June 8, 2017
Portugal	Pimpinha Jardim and Cinha Jardim	September 17, 2017
Portugal	Hélia Silva and António Silva	October 31, 2018
China	Liu Wentian	March 21, 2014
China	Liang Shuping (Annual champion for 2013)	December 31, 2013
China	Nancy and Tian Jing	December 17, 2013
China	Yang Pengfei	October 8, 2013
China	Zheng Caiqian	July 2, 2013

== See also ==
- Cash and Carry
- Shop 'til You Drop
- Supermarket Sweep
