= Jorge Traverso (footballer) =

Argentine footballer

Personal information
- Full name: Jorge Ubaldo Traverso
- Date of birth: 18 October 1947 (age 79)
- Position: Goalkeeper

Senior career*
Years	Team	Apps	(Gls)
1965–1968	Chacarita Juniors		
- * Club domestic league appearances and goals

Jorge Ubaldo Traverso (born 18 October 1947) is an Argentine former footballer.
