= Subrayado =

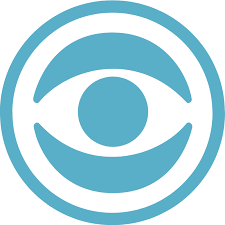
- Created by: Omar Defeo
- Directed by: Marcelo Baldovino
- Presented by: Blanca Rodríguez
- Theme music composer: Carlos Cotelo Zirolo
- Country of origin: Uruguay
- Original language: Spanish

Production
- Producer: Eduardo Preve
- Production locations: Channel 10 Headquarters, Montevideo

Original release
- Network: Channel 10
- Release: 1971

Subrayado is the news program of the Uruguayan Channel 10. It airs from Monday to Friday at three different times, in addition to a broadcast on Sundays and holidays.

The first broadcast of Subrayado was in 1971 under the leadership of the journalist Omar Defeo, being its director until 1989. It is currently the most watched newscast in Uruguay. It has also been accoladed with the Iris Award for best newscast on several occasions.

== Presenters ==
In 1990, Blanca Rodríguez and Jorge Traverso began presenting the central edition of Subrayado. In 2010, they would celebrate 20 uninterrupted years in front of the Channel 10 newscast and flagship. In 2013 Jorge Traverso left the news program to continue his talk show Hablemos. In his last day presenting the newscast, his colleague Blanca Rodríguez said goodbye to him on the air with an emotional speech and recognition of his career and companionship for so many years, "This is how the world is, friends" she stated. It is a phrase immortalized by Traverso at the end of the editions of the central newscast, that was declared a national heritage by the National Academy of Letters.

Among the main communicators of the newscast are Carolina García (host of the noon and Sunday editions); José Irazábal (host of the First News and Noon edition); Alfredo Dante (host of the First News and Sunday edition); and Paola Botti (host of the First News edition); all of them also participate in different sections in the central edition.

== News Editions ==
- Noon Edition (Monday to Friday at 1 p.m.)
- Central Edition (Monday to Friday at 7 p.m.)
- Saturday Edition (Saturday at 7 p.m.)
- Sunday Edition (Sunday at 7 p.m.)
