= Fernando Vilar =

Uruguayan journalist and news anchor (born 1954)

Fernando Vilar (born 15 February 1954) is a Portuguese-born Uruguayan journalist and news anchor.

Born in Lara, Monção, Northern Portugal, he has lived in Uruguay since his childhood. He started his journalist career in the 1980s at El Espectador. Since 1993 he is the main news anchor at Telenoche 4, a news program at Monte Carlo TV and In the mornings he speaks at De primera mano, a radio program at Radiocero FM.
