= Marcelo Tejera =

Uruguayan footballer (born 1973)

Personal information
- Full name: Marcos Marcelo Tejera Battagliesi
- Date of birth: August 6, 1973 (age 53)
- Place of birth: Montevideo, Uruguay
- Height: 1.75 m (5 ft 9 in)
- Position: Attacking midfielder

Senior career*
Years	Team	Apps	(Gls)
1989–1992	Defensor Sporting	58	(5)
1992–1993	Cagliari	5	(0)
1993–1995	Boca Juniors	18	(1)
1995–1996	Defensor Sporting	36	(10)
1996–2000	Logroñés	85	(10)
2000–2002	Defensor Sporting	93	(24)
2003–2004	Tecos UAG	66	(8)
2005	Southampton	0	(0)
2005	Peñarol	12	(4)
2006	Defensor Sporting	5	(1)
2006–2007	Nacional	18	(2)
2007	Millonarios	10	(2)
2008–2009	Liverpool	16	(1)

International career
1991	Uruguay U-20		
1991–2005	Uruguay	5	(0)
- * Club domestic league appearances and goals as of 1 January 2008

Marcelo Tejera (born August 6, 1973) is a former Uruguayan footballer who played as an attacking midfielder.

Tejera made his debut for the Uruguay national team in a friendly match against Mexico (1–1 draw) on November 20, 1991 in Veracruz, substituting Gabriel Cedrés in the 75th minute.
