= Telemundo 12 =

Uruguayan news program

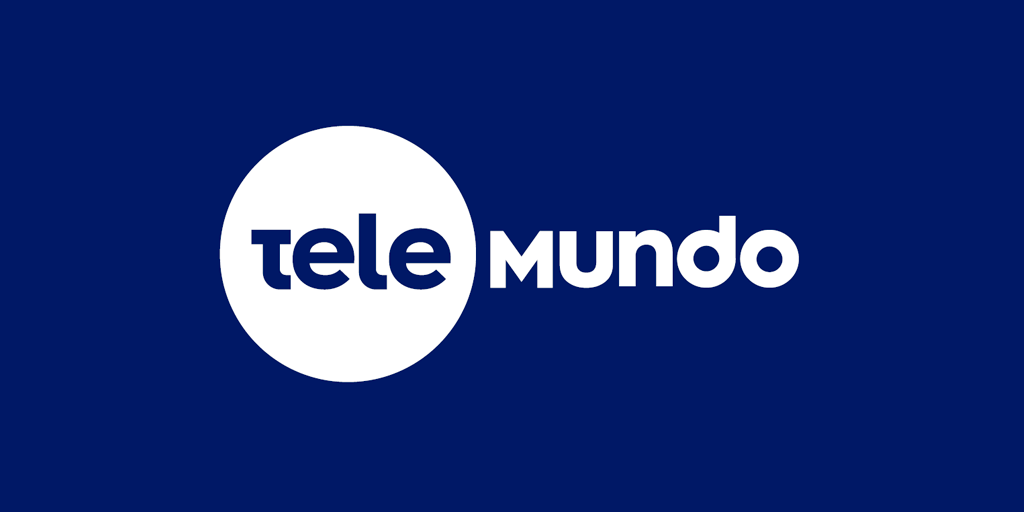
- Also known as: Telemundo
- Presented by: Aldo Silva; Malena Castaldi; Mariano López; Lucía Brocal; Fernanda Cabrera; Valentín Rodríguez; Ileana da Silva
- Country of origin: Uruguay
- Original language: Spanish

Production
- Production locations: Channel 12 Headquarters, Montevideo

Original release
- Network: Teledoce
- Release: May 3, 1962

Telemundo, also known as Telemundo 12 is the news program of the Uruguayan channel, Teledoce. It airs from Monday to Friday at three different times, in addition to a broadcast on Saturdays and Sundays. It has been broadcast since 1962.

== History ==
From its first broadcast, in 1962 and until 2002, it was presented by the journalist Neber Araujo, who was accompanied by different journalists over time.

For almost sixteen years, journalists Aldo Silva and Claudia Garcia were co-presenters of the central newscast, where a lot of journalists went by, and even set changes. However, in March 2019 and after a decision by the channel's authorities, the journalist Claudia Garcia was surprisingly removed from the newscast. Such was the surprise that the viewers were taken on the day that the news began to be rumored and confirmed, that obviously the criticisms of these authorities and the messages of affection to the journalist did not take long to appear.

The central newscast of Monday, June 10, 2019 was historic, given that it completely renewed its scenery, removing the traditional table, from now on its drivers are standing. This renewal was intended to completely change the aesthetics of Telemundo, but also its essence and the way the news is presented. The journalist Aldo Silva is the one who continues to anchor this newscast but is accompanied by journalists Malena Castaldi and Mariano Lopez, the trio of presenters are divided into different segments, accompanied by columnists who participate to develop the most relevant topics of the day.

== News Editions ==
The news division of Teledoce has three editions:

- Morning's Telemundo: First broadcast in 2005, this newscast was conceived as the successor to "The Alarm Clock" magazine. Currently, it is presented by Fernanda Cabrera, Valentín Rodríguez Bausero and Damián Herrera in the sports section. It airs Monday through Friday from 7:00 a.m. at 8:00 a.m.
- Noon's Telemundo (Former "First Edition"): This edition of the newscast debuted on June 5, 2000, with Alejandro Etchegorry and Renée Laffitte as presenters. Currently, the hosts are Lucia Brocal and Valentin Rodriguez in the development of the information, and Martín Kesman along with Rodrigo Romano in the sports section. It airs Monday through Friday from 1:00 p.m. at 2:30 p.m.
- Central Telemundo: It is the main central edition of this newscast. Currently presented by Aldo Silva, Malena Castaldi and Mariano López in its edition from Monday to Friday. On Saturdays, it is hosted by Lucía Brocal, and on Sunday by Iliana da Silva and Mariano López. It airs Monday through Friday and Sunday from 7:00 p.m. at 9:15 p.m. On Saturdays it is broadcast from 7:00 p.m. at 8:30 p.m.

== On-air staff ==
=== Current ===
- Valentín Rodríguez Bausero (Morning's Telemundo, Noon's Telemundo)
- Fernanda Cabrera (Morning's Telemundo)
- Lucía Brocal (Morning's Telemundo, Saturday's Central Telemundo)
- Aldo Silva (Central Telemundo)
- Malena Castaldi (Central Telemundo)
- Mariano López (Central Telemundo, Sunday's Central Telemundo)
- Iliana Da Silva (Sunday's Central Telemundo)
- Alberto Kesman (Sports section)
- Martín Kesman (Sports section)
- Damián Herrera (Sports section)
- José Carlos Álvarez de Ron (Sports section)
- Federico Buysán (Sports section)
- Leonardo Díaz (Sports section)
- Rodrigo Romano (Sports section)
- Laura Raffo (Economy section)
- Emiliano Cotelo (Interviews)
- Carlos Dopico (Entertainment)
- Héctor García (Equestrianism)
- Diego Bernabé (International news)
- Diego Castro (Police News)
- Camila Cibils

=== Former on-air staff ===
- Néber Araújo
- Laura Daners
- Claudia García
- Martín Sarthou
- Silvia Kliche
- Renée Laffitte
- Pablo Rodríguez
- Gastón Solé
- Gabriela Santini
- María Noel Marrone
- Alejandro Etchegorry
- Alfonso Lessa
