= El País (Uruguay) =

Daily newspaper based in Uruguay

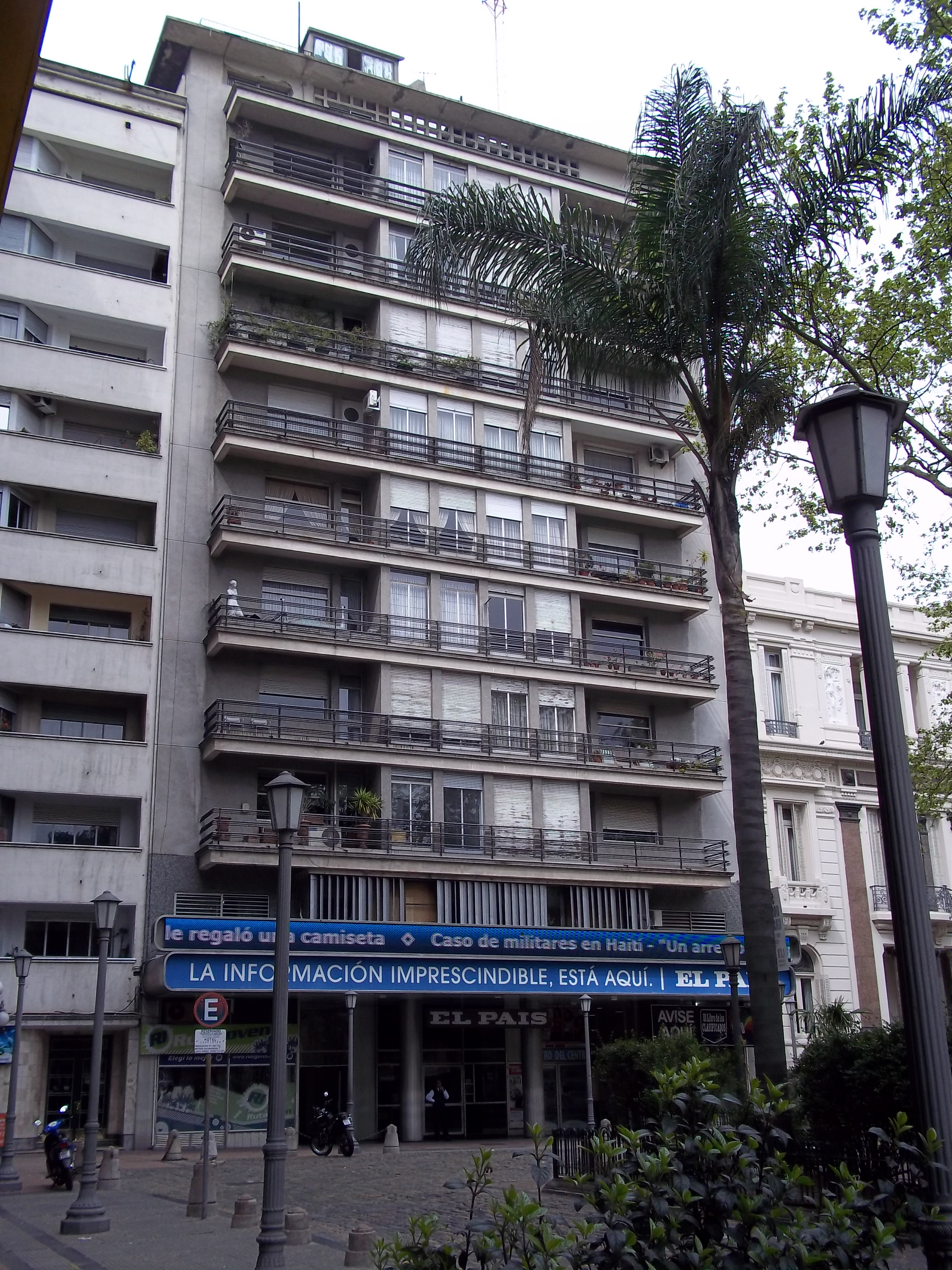
- Headquarters of the newspaper, in front of Plaza de Cagancha
- Type: Daily newspaper
- Founded: September 14, 1918
- Political alignment: Partido Nacional; Conservative liberalism
- Headquarters: Montevideo, Uruguay
- Circulation: 65,000
- Website: El País

El País is a national Uruguayan daily newspaper. It is based in the capital city of Montevideo and is regarded as the newspaper with the largest circulation in the country. It was first published on September 14, 1918, and previously belonged to the same media group as the television network Teledoce.

== History ==
El País was founded on September 14, 1918. Founded by journalists Leonel Aguirre, Eduardo Rodríguez Larreta and Washington Beltrán Barbat, in 1919 Carlos Scheck joined the group. Originally, it was related to the National Party, precisely with the Independent National Party. However it later developed into a general interest newspaper.

For decades, El País has been among the leading written media in Uruguay, with a circulation of 65,000 on weekdays and 100,000 on Sundays. Its editorial focus is on the social, political and economic news of Uruguay, as well as the Mercosur regional trade alliance.

== Awards ==
From 1991 to 2012 El País had been awarding the prize "El País King of European Soccer" for the best footballer in Europe.

The first winner was French Jean-Pierre Papin.

Argentine football player Lionel Messi and French Zinedine Zidane were the record winners with 4 wins each.

Messi won all four awards successively (2009–12).

Year	Player	Club
1991	Jean-Pierre Papin	Olympique de Marseille
1992	Marco van Basten	A.C. Milan
1993	Roberto Baggio	Juventus FC
1994	Paolo Maldini	A.C. Milan
1995	George Weah	Paris Saint-Germain F.C. / A.C. Milan
1996	Ronaldo	PSV Eindhoven / FC Barcelona
1997	Ronaldo	FC Barcelona / Inter Milan
1998	Zinedine Zidane	Juventus FC
1999	Rivaldo	FC Barcelona
2000	Luís Figo	FC Barcelona / Real Madrid C.F.
2001	Zinedine Zidane	Juventus FC / Real Madrid C.F.
2002	Zinedine Zidane	Real Madrid C.F.
2003	Zinedine Zidane	Real Madrid C.F.
2004	Ronaldinho	FC Barcelona
2005	Ronaldinho	FC Barcelona
2006	Ronaldinho	FC Barcelona
2007	Kaká	A.C. Milan
2008	Cristiano Ronaldo	Manchester United F.C.
2009	Lionel Messi	FC Barcelona
2010	Lionel Messi	FC Barcelona
2011	Lionel Messi	FC Barcelona
2012	Lionel Messi	FC Barcelona

== Most wins by player ==
Player	Number of Wins
Lionel Messi	4
Zinedine Zidane	4
Ronaldinho	3
Ronaldo	2
