= Jorge Traverso (journalist) =

Uruguayan writer and journalist (1945–2025)

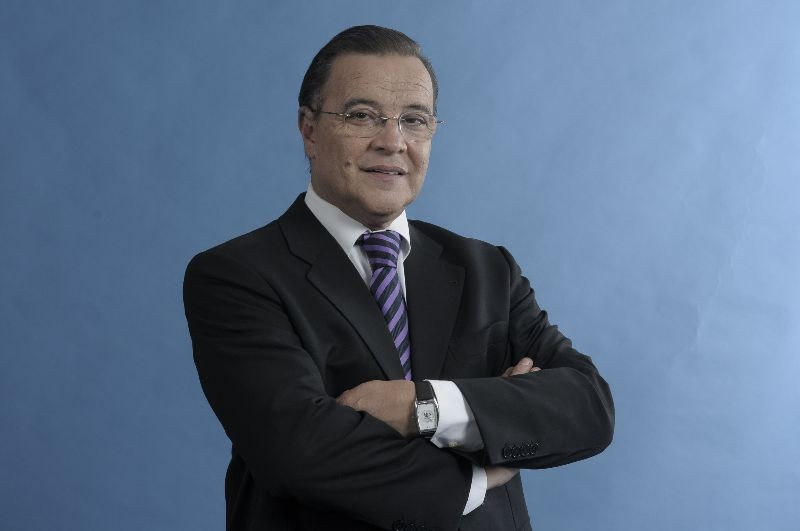
- Born: Schubert Jorge Pérez Denis; March 29, 1945; Montevideo, Uruguay
- Died: April 27, 2025 (aged 80); Montevideo, Uruguay
- Occupations: Journalist; writer; news anchor
- Children: 4

Schubert Jorge Pérez Denis (March 29, 1945 – April 27, 2025), better known by his stage name Jorge Traverso, was a Uruguayan journalist and news anchor.

Traverso was born in Montevideo on March 29, 1945. He died in Montevideo on April 27, 2025, at the age of 80.
