= Teledoce =

Uruguayan television network

Teledoce (CXB12 TV Canal 12)
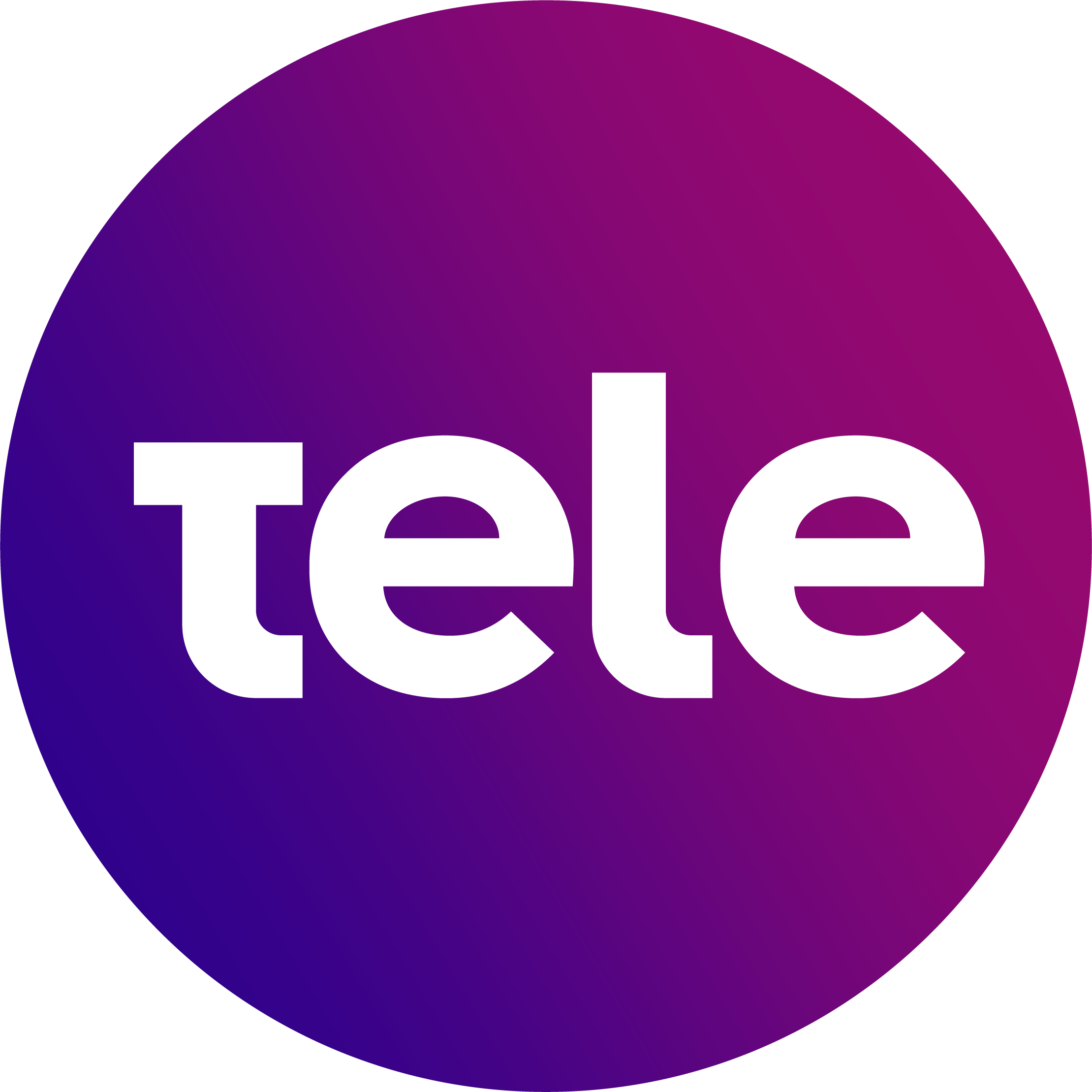
- Logo used since 2022
- Montevideo, Montevideo Department; Uruguay
- Channels: Analog: 12 (VHF); Digital: 28 (UHF)
- Branding: Teledoce

Programming
- Language: Spanish

Ownership
- Owner: Grupo Cardoso (since 2011); (Sociedad Televisora Larrañaga)

History
- Founded: 1962
- First air date: May 2, 1962
- Former affiliations: El Trece

Technical information
- Licensing authority: URSEC

Links
- Website: www.teledoce.com

Teledoce, also known as Canal 12 or La Tele, is a Uruguayan free-to-air television station, located in the capital of Uruguay, Montevideo. It is owned by Grupo Disco. Television transmissions commenced in 1962.

== History ==
It was the third and last private free-to-air channel that opened in Montevideo. Studios are located on 1276 Enriqueta Compte y Riqué Street, being the only one of the private ones that was always kept in its original place. Its first director was Raúl Galana, but soon Horacio Scheck took his place. The station's antenna was installed for several years on the roof of the newspaper El País, but for several years it has been located in the Congress Tower, in the Tres Cruces district.

The first slogan was "The Family Channel". It first shows were El Show del Mediodía, presented by comedians Cacho de la Cruz and Alejandro Trotta, and Telecataplúm, which managed to achieve great success in Argentina. The channel's newscast is Telemundo.

In 1980, with the beginning of color television in Uruguay, the channel took the name "Teledoce Televisora Color", but then stopped using that name, becoming simply "Teledoce" and later "La Tele". Since 2003 it broadcasts the event to raise funds for disabled children called Telethon Uruguay together with Channel 10. After a few years, Channel 4, TNU, and finally VTV joined.

== Logos through the years ==
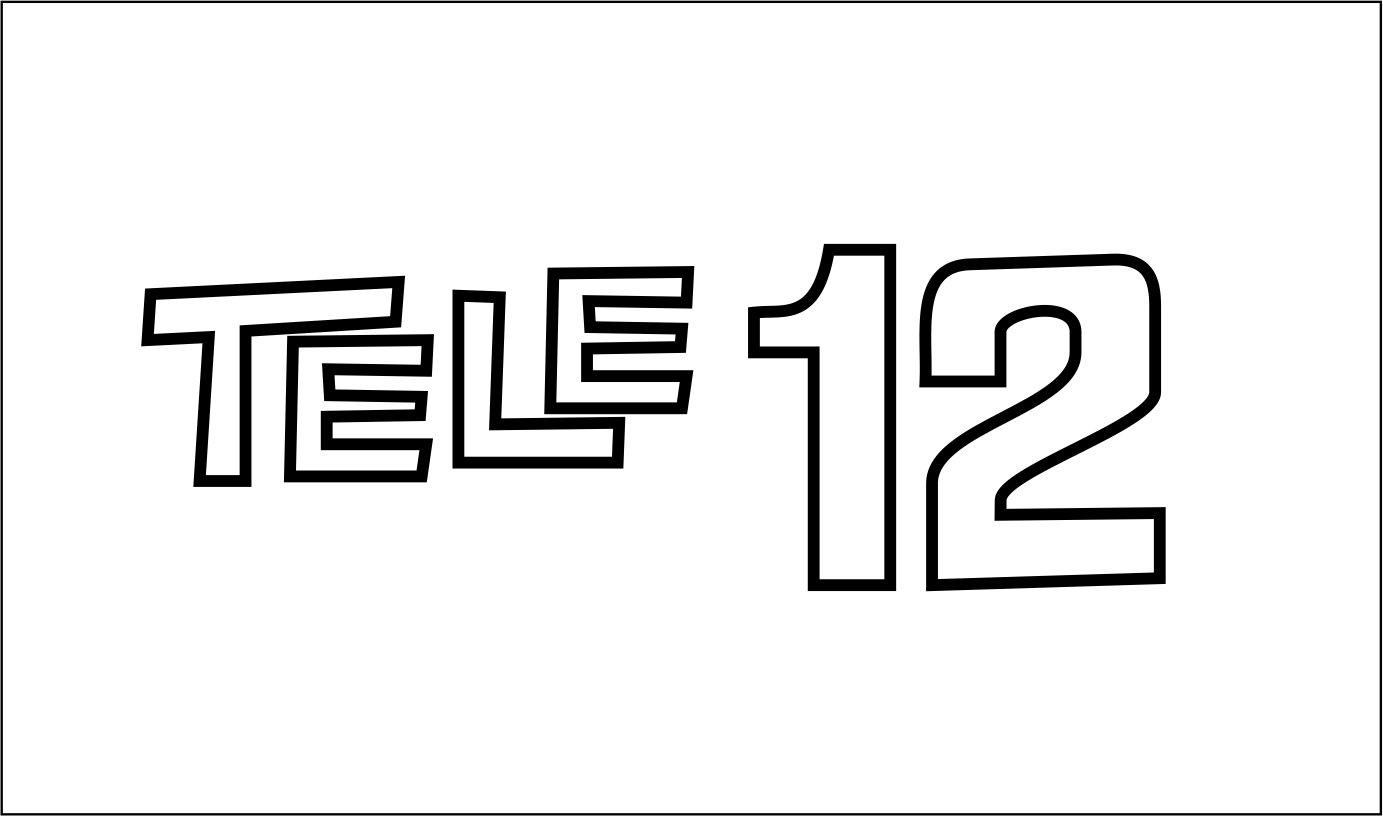
1962–68

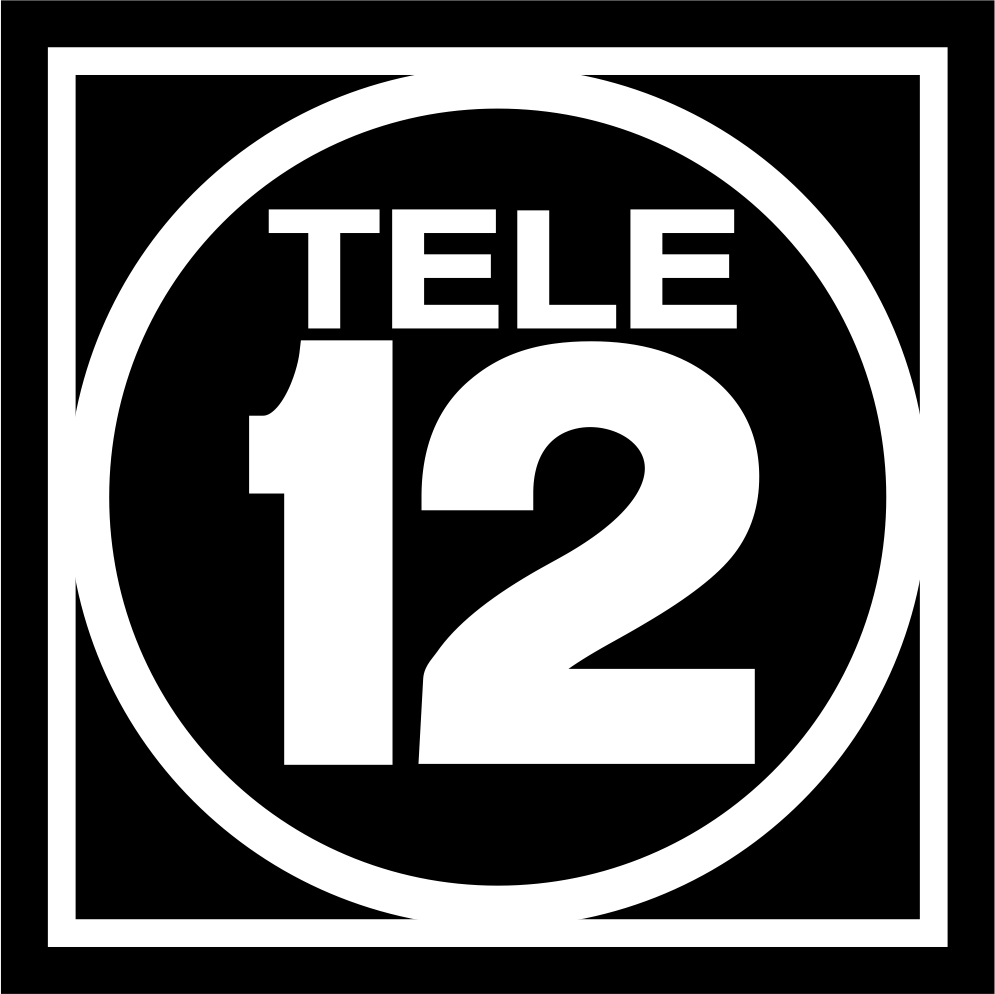
1968–74

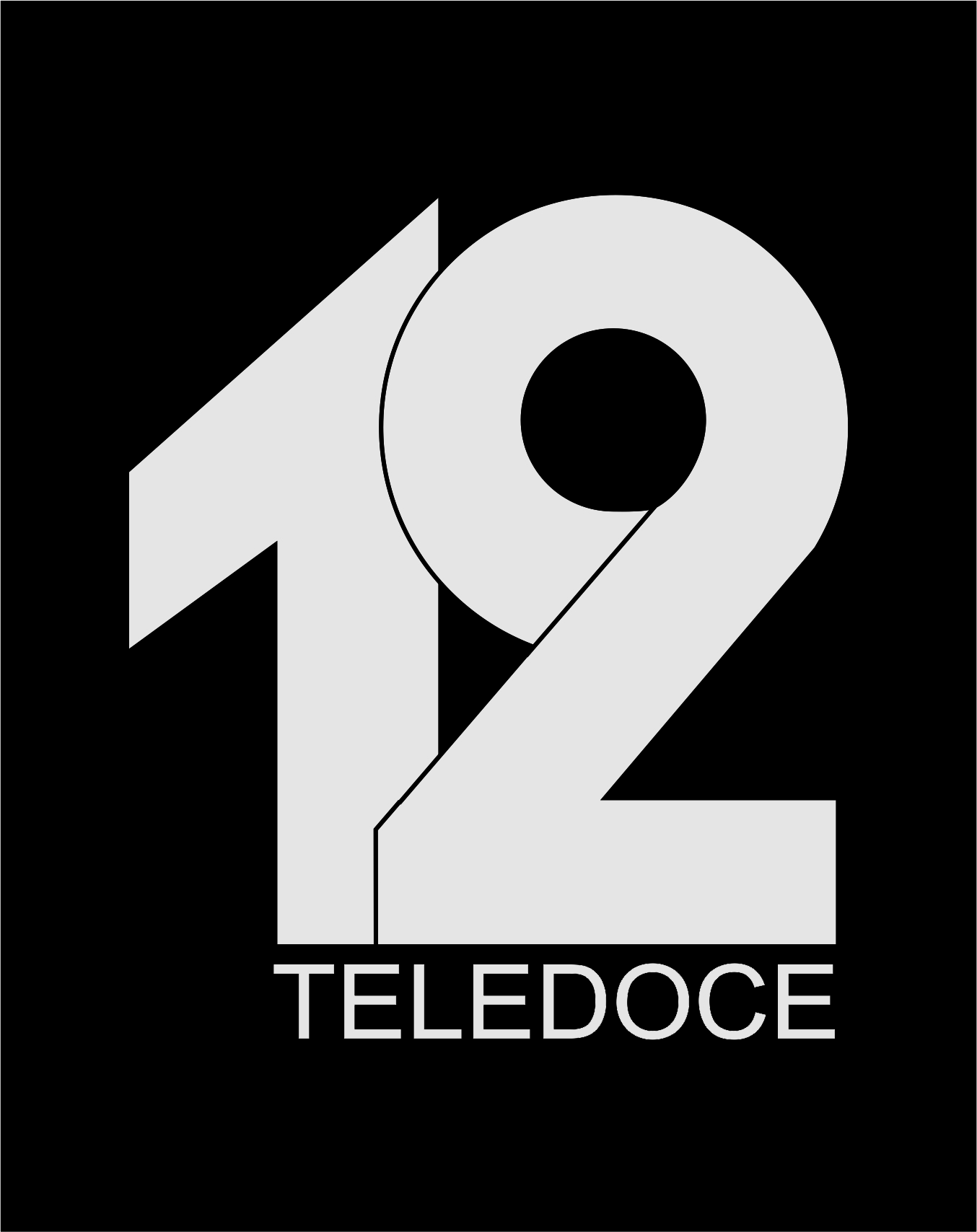
1974–80

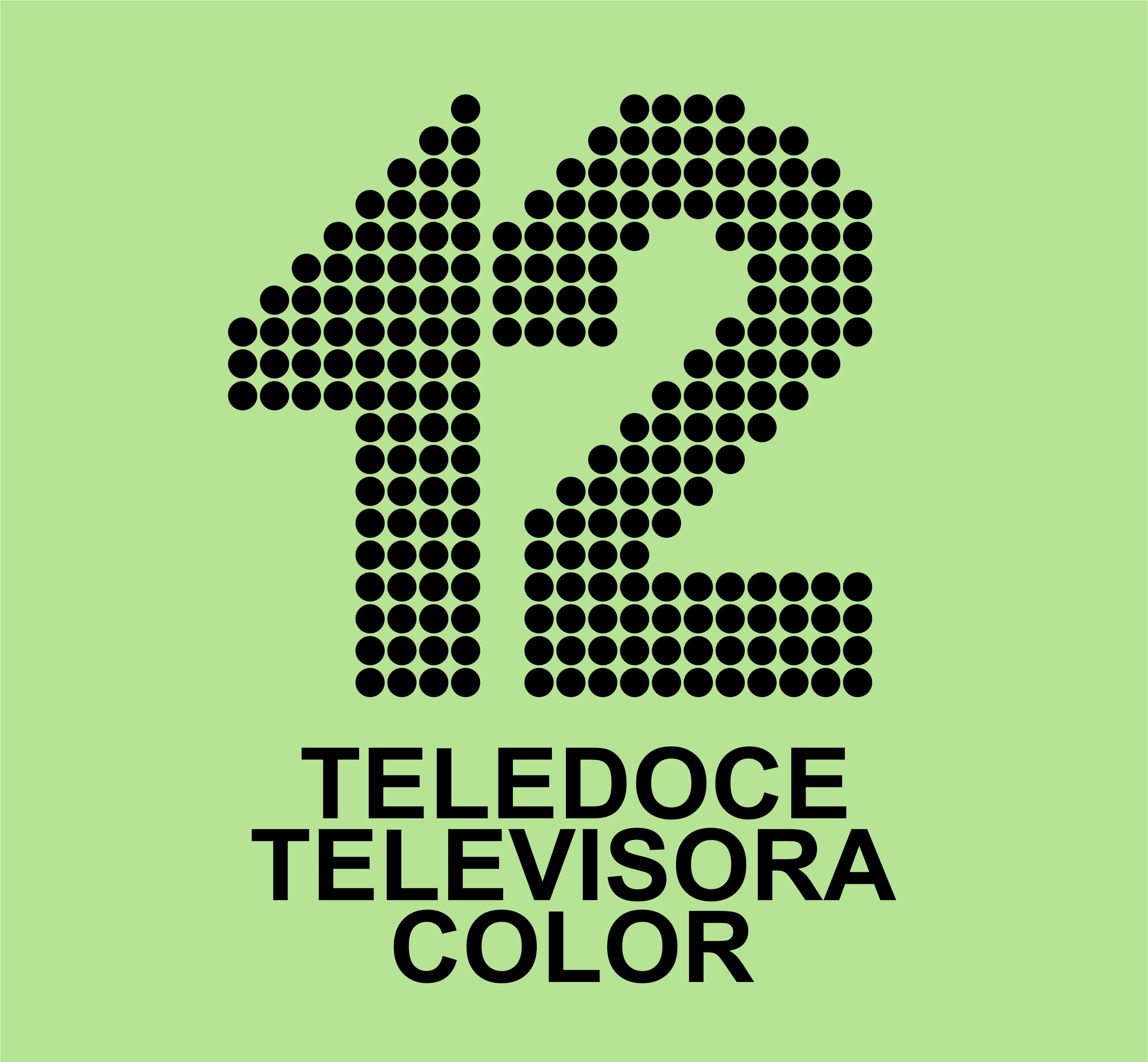
1980–82

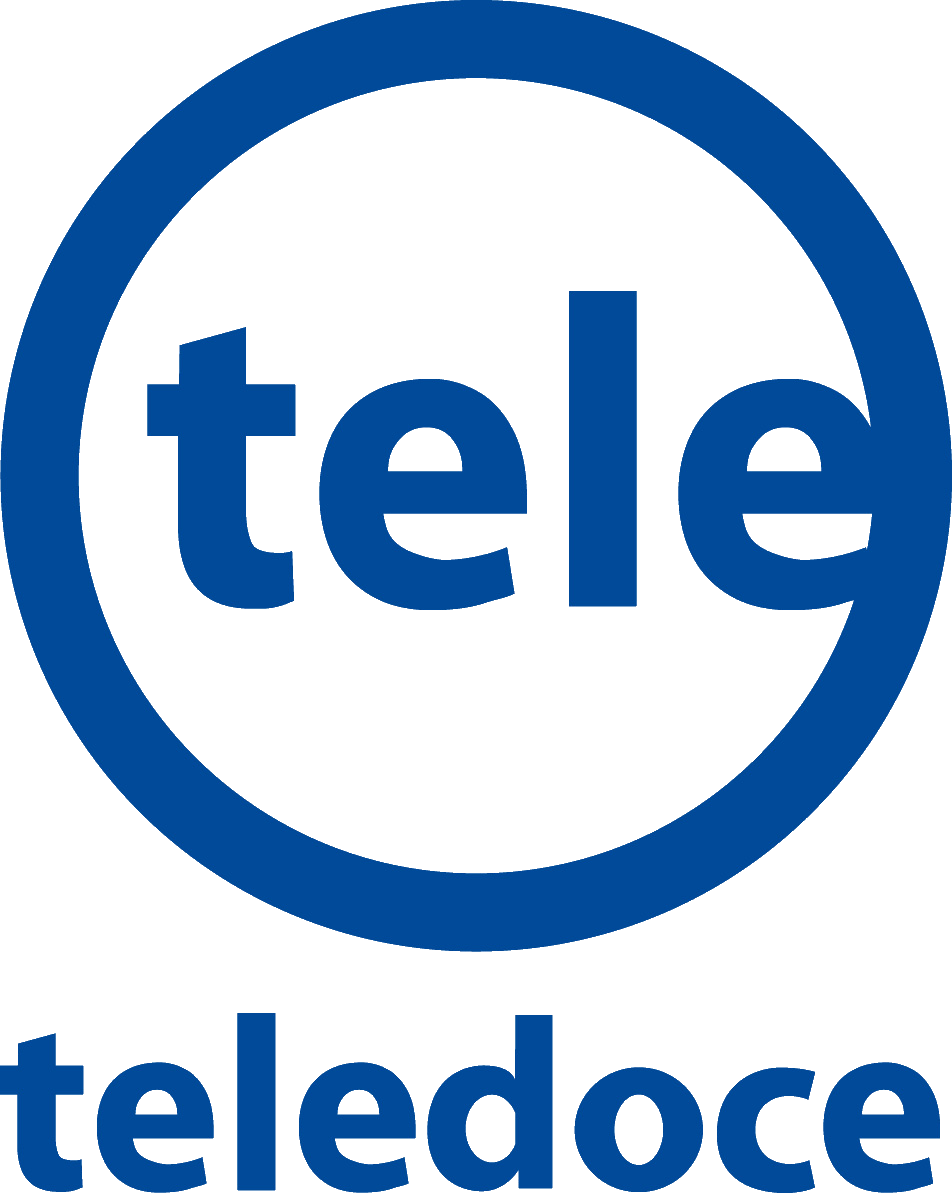
2004–19

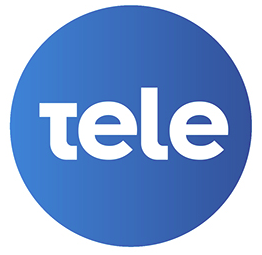
2019–22

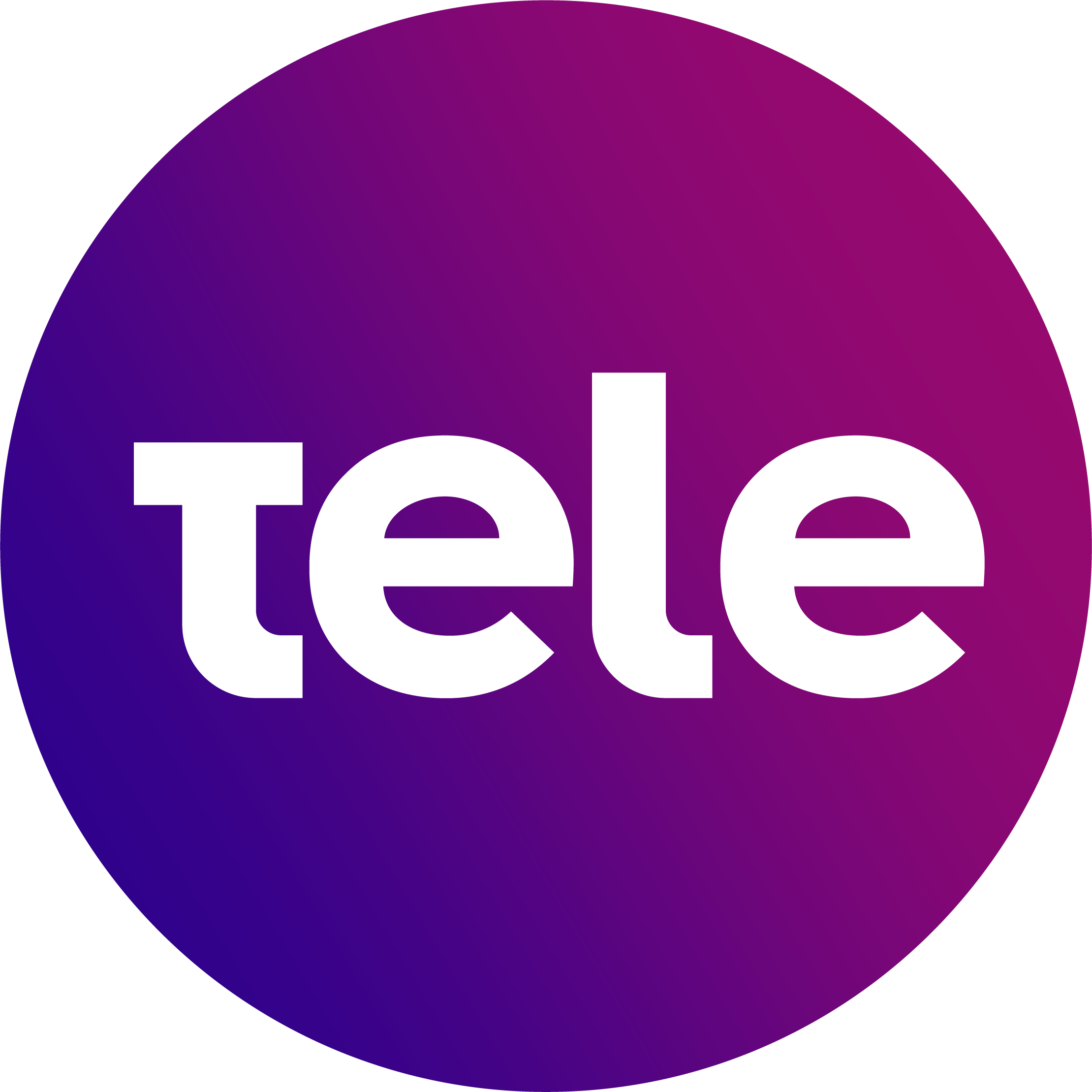
2022-present

== Programming ==
- Telemundo (1962–present): is the channel's news division. It has three editions from Monday to Friday and one edition on weekends.
- Vértigo (1982–present): is a program that is focused on motorsports and shows the details and careers of the sport. It is presented by Fernando Parrado, Nelson Vicente and Gonzalo Mateu.
- Americando (1991–present): a program that presents the culture and history of Uruguay. It is presented by the journalist Juan Carlos López.
- Esta boca es mía (2008–present): a talk show in which the current issues of the country are covered, such as journalistic and political issues. It is presented by Victoria Rodríguez.
- Súbete a mi moto (2013–present): is a program in which each episode visits a different place in Uruguay, combining travel, interviews and humor. It is presented by Rafael Villanueva.
- Mundo turf (2014–present): is a program in which the news and horse racing are presented. It is presented by Héctor "Puchi" García.
- La receta (2015–present): is a program in which different easy to cook dishes are made for the home. It is presented by Catalina De Palleja.
- Desayunos informales (2015–present): is a morning television show, broadcast from Monday to Friday.
- Algo que decir (2018–present): is a program presented by Cecilia Bonino and Pablo Fabregat, broadcast every Friday at 10:15 p.m. In each episode, four famous guests are invited, games and interviews are held.
- Trato Hecho (2019-present): Uruguayan adaptation of the Dutch game show Deal or No Deal
- Quedate en casa (2020–present): presented by Manuela da Silveira and Pablo Fabregat, stories of Uruguayans are shared during the COVID-19 pandemic. Doctors or experts in different areas are also interviewed.
- La Ruleta de la Suerte (2020–present): Uruguayan adaptation of the American game show Wheel of Fortune presented by Rafa Villanueva.
- Poné Play (2020–present): Uruguayan adaptation of the French game show Le Grand Blind test.
- 100 Uruguayos Dicen (2021–present): Uruguayan adaptation of the American game show Family Feud.
- ¿Quién es la máscara? (2022–2023): Uruguayan adaptation of the South Korean reality singing competition Masked Singer.
- El Último Pasajero (2022): game show in which high school students compete to win a senior trip to San Carlos de Bariloche.
- Veo cómo cantas (2024–present): Uruguayan adaptation of the South Korean game show I Can See Your Voice.
