= Canal 5 (Uruguay) =

National public television network of Uruguay

Canal 5 (Televisión Nacional Uruguay)
- Country: Uruguay
- Broadcast area: Uruguay
- Headquarters: Montevideo, Uruguay

Programming
- Language: Spanish
- Picture format: 1080i (HDTV) (downscaled to 16:9 576i for the SDTV feed)

Ownership
- Owner: Ministry of Education and Culture

History
- Launched: 19 June 1963
- Former names: Canal 5 Sodre (1963–1981); Sodre TV (1981–1995); Televisión Nacional Sodre (1995–2002); TVEO (2002–2005); Televisión Nacional Uruguay (2005–2021)

Links
- Website: mediospublicos.uy

Availability

Terrestrial
- Analog VHF: Channel 5 (Montevideo)
- Digital VHF: Channel 5.1

Canal 5 (English: Channel 5) is a Uruguayan national television network owned by the Ministry of Education and Culture. The channel began broadcasting on 19 June 1963.

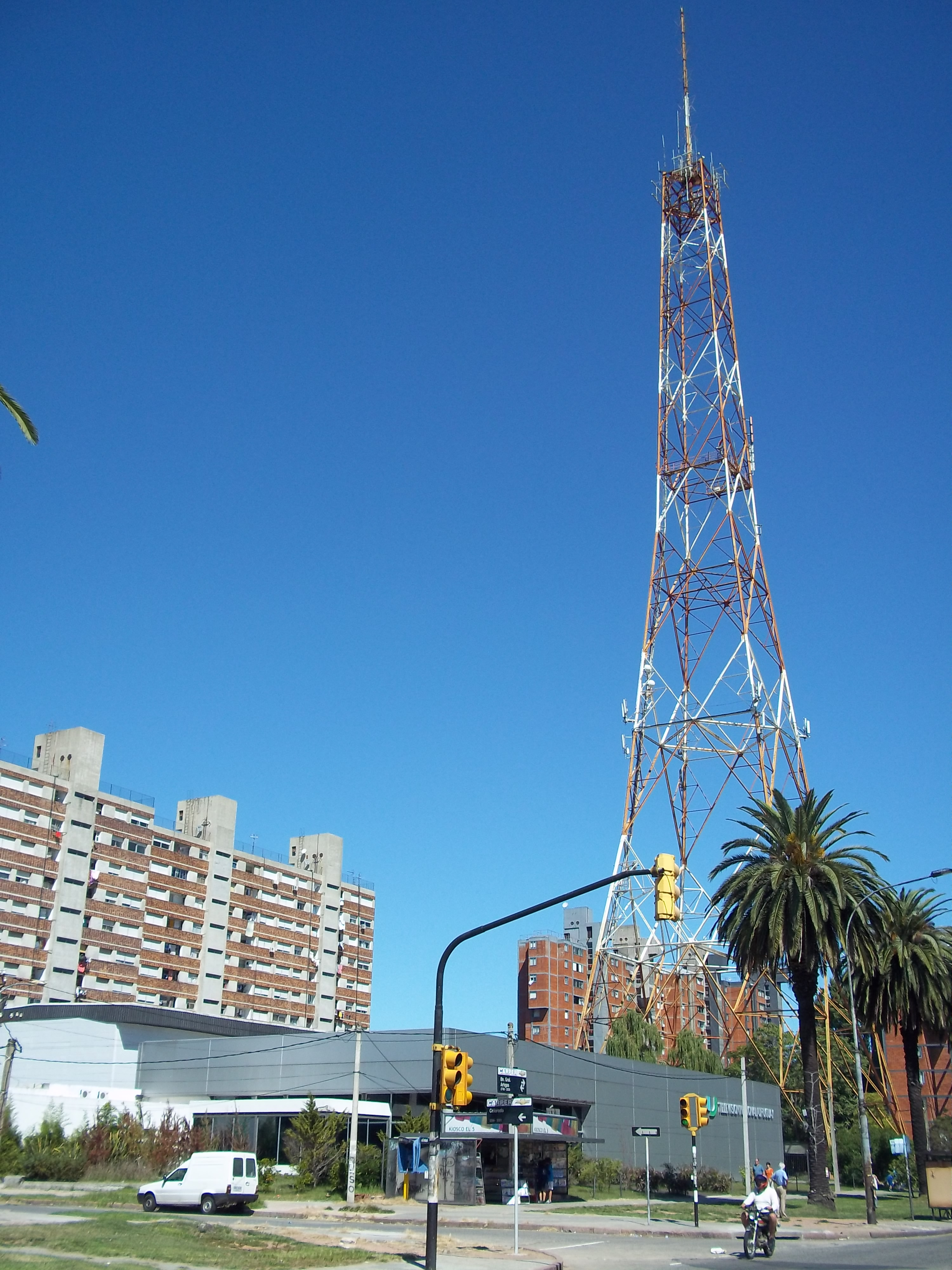
Canal 5 studios in Montevideo.

== Logos ==
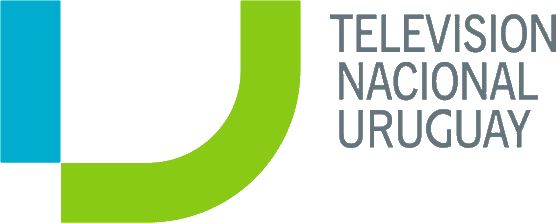
2005–2017

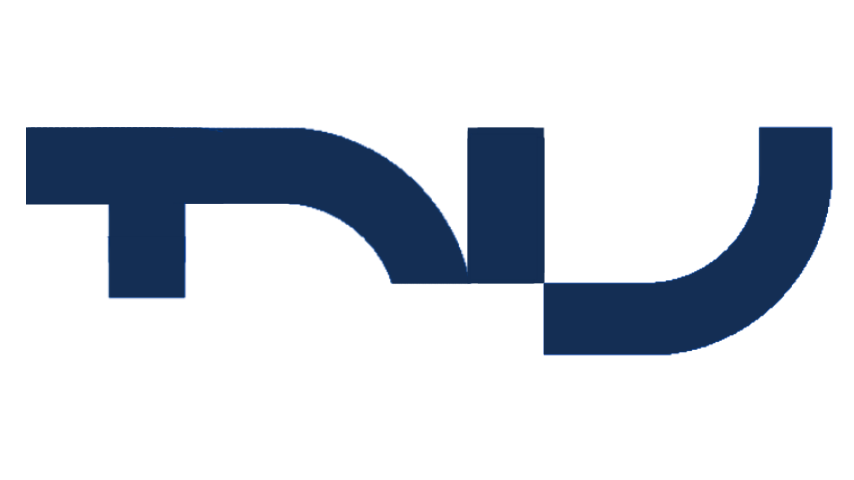
2018–2021

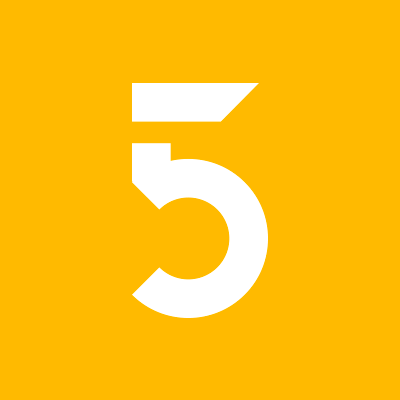
2021–2025
