= Canal 10 (Uruguay) =

Uruguayan TV channel

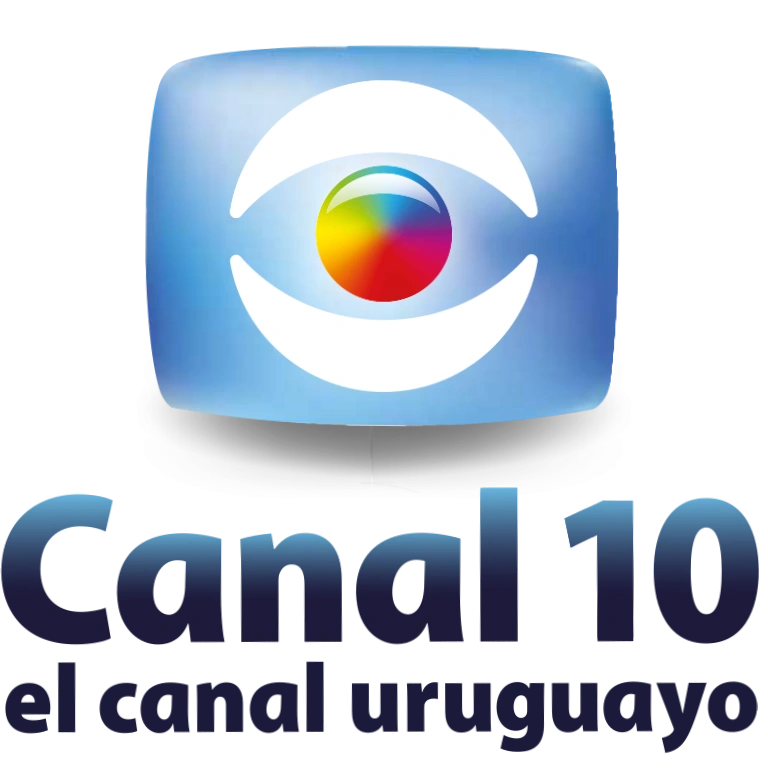
- Logo used since 2006
- Montevideo, Montevideo Department; Uruguay
- Channels: Analog: 10 (VHF); Digital: 31 (UHF)
- Branding: Canal 10

Ownership
- Owner: SAETA / SADREP; (Grupo Fontaina - De Feo)

History
- First air date: 7 December 1956
- Former affiliations: América TV

Technical information
- Licensing authority: URSEC

Links
- Webcast: www.canal10.com.uy/contenidos/vivo.html
- Website: www.canal10.com.uy

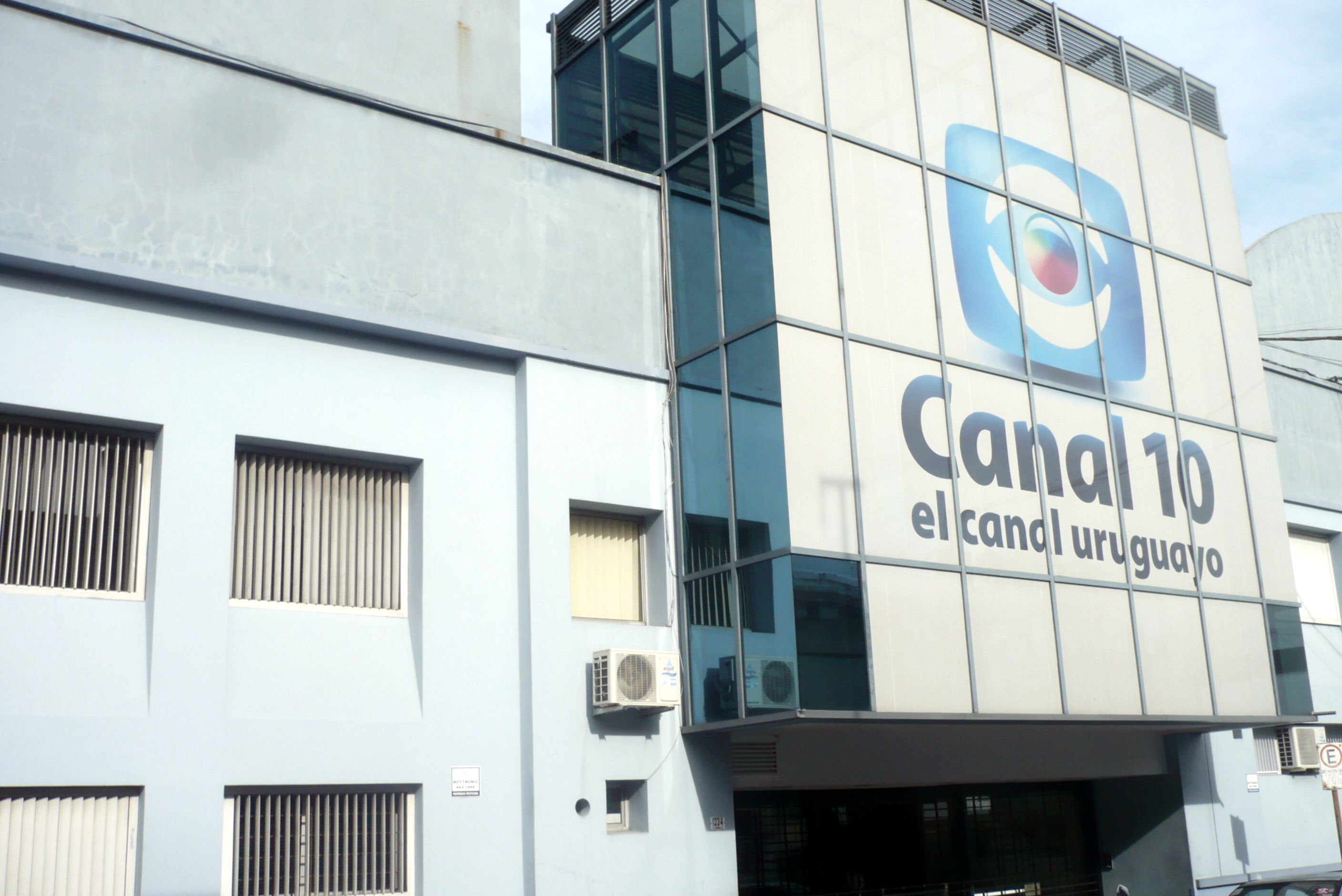
Channel 10 headquarters

Channel 10 (Canal Diez, legally known as SAETA TV Canal 10) is a Uruguayan free-to-air television station based in Montevideo. It began broadcasting in 1956 as the first television broadcaster in the country and the fourth in Latin America. Its owned and operated by the Sociedad Anónima Emisora de Televisión y Anexos (SAETA). The network's headquarters are in the Palermo neighbourhood.

== History ==
In 1949, businessmen Raúl Fontaina and Enrique de Feo created, together with the National Association of Uruguayan Broadcasters, the Sociedad Anónima Emisora de Televisión y Anexos (SAETA), and approved the statute for the creation of Channel 10.

In 1956, during the First National Production Exhibition held at the Cilindro Municipal, the first transmission of the network were made. Raúl Fontaina Islas was the first television presenter of the network and the country. After the presentation, the National Anthem of Uruguay was sung in a ceremony attended by the then Minister of Public Works, Héctor Grauert.

The station moved to new facilities at Tacuarembó 1234 in 1964, which has grown over time due to the annexation of adjacent properties. In 1970, Raúl Fontaina resigns from his position as director, being replaced by Juan Enrique De Feo.

In 1991, Grupo Fontaina-De Feo acquires Canal 7 Maldonado, becoming its inland affiliate. In January 1995, Canal 10 and its parent company set up cable company TCC (Tractoral S.A.), in conjunction with Equital. On October 10, 1996, the channel aired for the first time in stereo, with the airing of Malcolm X, however the programming was still predominantly monaural and its recording equipment was still analog.

== Programming ==
=== Current ===
Original programming

- Informativo Carve (radio news)
- Subrayado (news)
- Got Talent Uruguay (talent show)
- Arriba gente (magazine)
- La mañana en casa (magazine)
- La tarde en casa (magazine)
- Puglia invita (interviews)
- Consentidas (interviews)
- Vida y obra (interviews)
- Día cero (documentaries)
- La peluquería de don Mateo (entertainment)
- Polémica en el bar (talk show)
- Punto Penal (sports magazine)
- Mejor con música (music)
- ¿Quién quiere ser millonario? (quiz show)
- Got Talent Uruguay (talent show)
- La Voz Uruguay (singing competition)
- La Voz Kids Uruguay (singing competition)

Acquired programming

- Caso Cerrado (court show; Telemundo)
- Blue Bloods (fiction; CBS)
- CSI: Miami (fiction; CBS)
- FBI (fiction; CBS)
- The Mentalist (fiction; CBS)
- Bir Zamanlar Çukurova / Tierra amarga (fiction; ATV)
- Sefirin Kızı / La hija del embajador (fiction; Star TV)

=== Former ===
Original programming

- Decalegrón (comedy)
- MasterChef (talent show)
- Pasapalabra (game show)
- Escape perfecto (game show)
- El juego del año (game show)
- Salven el millón (game show)
- Bien de bien (game show)
- Bendita TV (entertainment)
- Caleidoscopio (interviews)
- Debate abierto (interviews)
- Dicho y hecho (interviews)
- Zona urbana (political)
- Deporte total (sports magazine)
- Charoná TV (children show)
- Porque te quiero así (telenovela)
- Dance! La fuerza del corazón (telenovela)
- Bienes gananciales (comedy)
- Temporario (series)

Acquired programming

- Ahora caigo (game show; Antena 3)
- The Simpsons
- İstanbullu Gelin / Sureya (fiction; Star TV)
- Kadın / Coraje de mujer (fiction; Fox Turkey)
- Kırgın Çiçekler / Flores de cristal (fiction; ATV)
- Kızım / ¿Y tú quién eres? (fiction; TV8)
- Meryem (fiction; Kanal D)

== Antenna ==
Channel 10's transmitting antenna, measuring 187 meters in height, is called the Saeta Tower. It was built and inaugurated sometime after the channel moved to its current address. It stems from the idea and subsequent efforts of Milton Fontaina. Today it is the highest structure in Montevideo and can be seen from many parts of the city. Over the past 5 years, Channel 12, of Uruguay, rent a portion of the antenna to transmit their programming.

== Logo ==
In the early 1960s, the channel adopted the American network CBS Eye to its logo, and reintroduced the CRT shape. In 1970, the logo was simplified, with the number 1 depicting an arrow, and the eye on the right for the number 0. A sky blue background was used with the advent of color television in 1981. In 1992, the central sphere of the 0 became colorized. In 2002, the arrow 1 was removed, and the Uruguayan flag was adopted as background. The logo was last modified in 2006, with the chromed contour removed and the background changed back to sky blue.

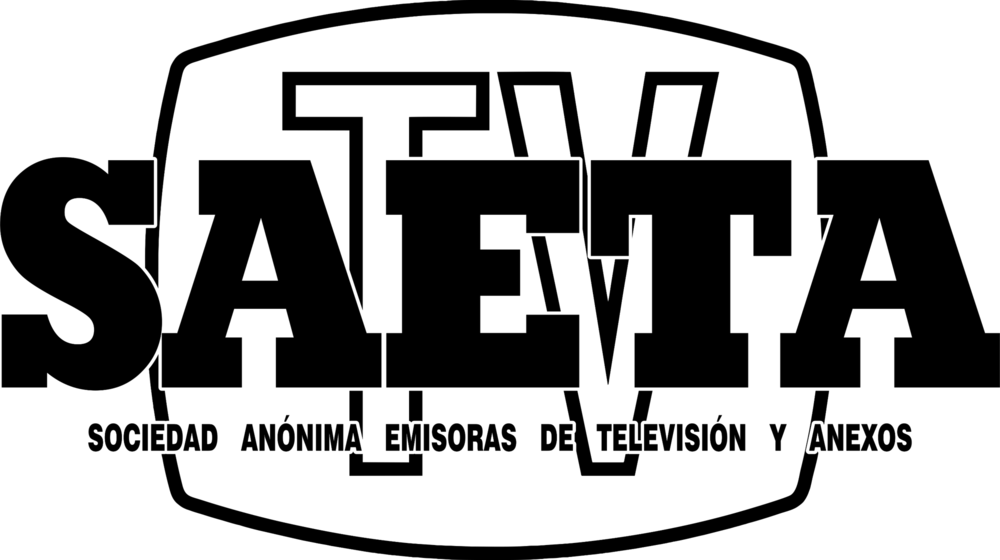
1956-1960

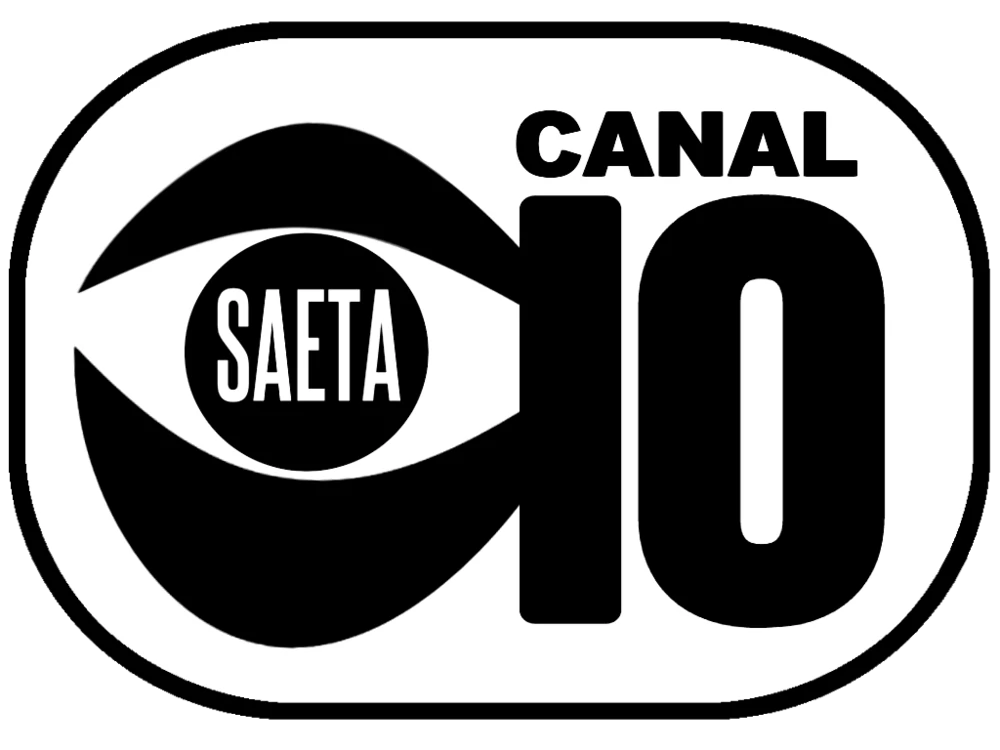
1964-1971

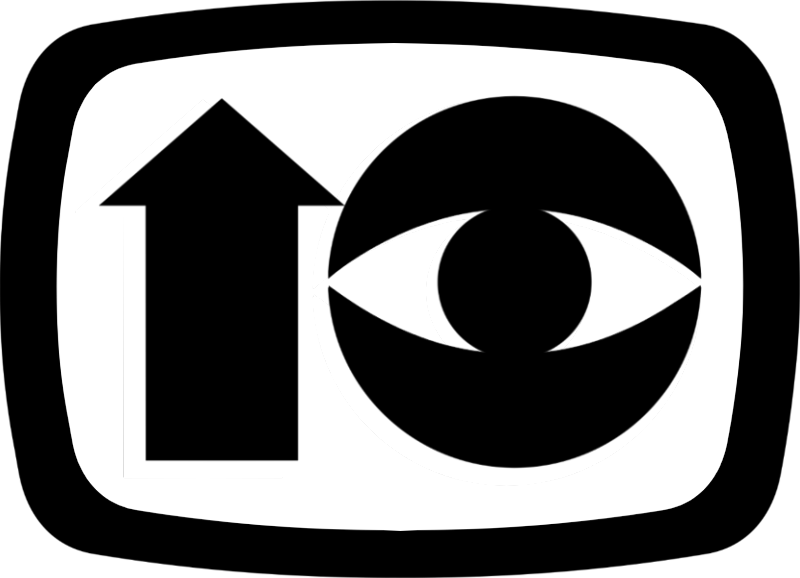
1971-1983

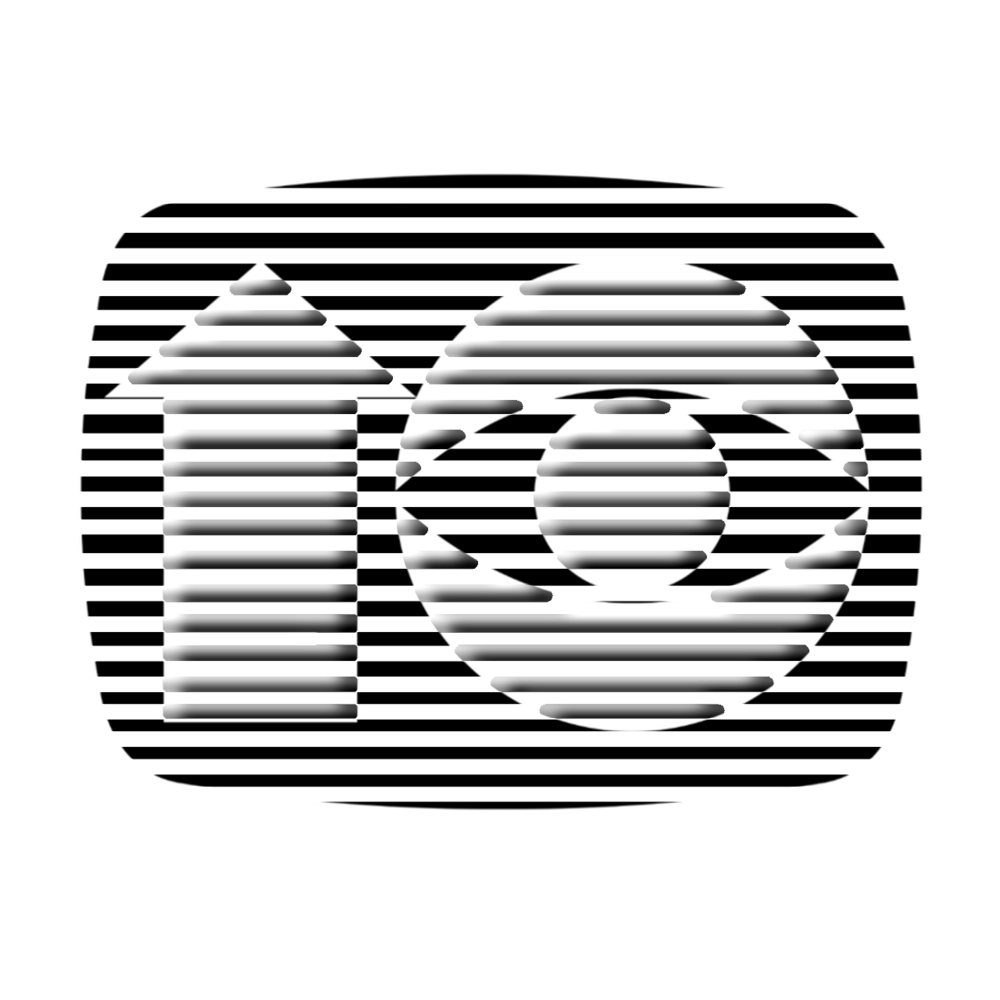
1983-1985

== Film ==
In the year 2006 the channel signed a contract with film companies: Warner Brothers, 20th Century Fox, Paramount, and DreamWorks, to transmit the most recent releases of these film companies. These releases are already being cast in "Film Festival", a program that airs Monday at 9:00 pm. A person specializing in film on Channel 10 is Jackie Rodriguez Stratta, for many years in Saeta.

== Competitions ==
It was the first channel to create a talent competition in 1996, marking its 40th anniversary. Channel 4 followed with a similar format in 2004. In 2006, celebrating its 50th anniversary, the new Channel 10 launched a contest called CONTA, which invited submissions for series, novels, cartoons, and other creative works related to CONTA and Channel 10. In 2007, the channel premiered the national fiction series Flat 8, which won first prize. On September 5, 2007, another CONTA production, History Clinic, premiered. The cooking competition MasterChef aired from 2017 to 2019, and Got Talent Uruguay debuted in 2020.

== Sports events ==
Channel 10 broadcasts live matches of FIFA tournaments and qualifiers in simulcast with Tenfield (vía VTV).
