= List of Natalia Oreiro live performances =

Natalia Oreiro live performances
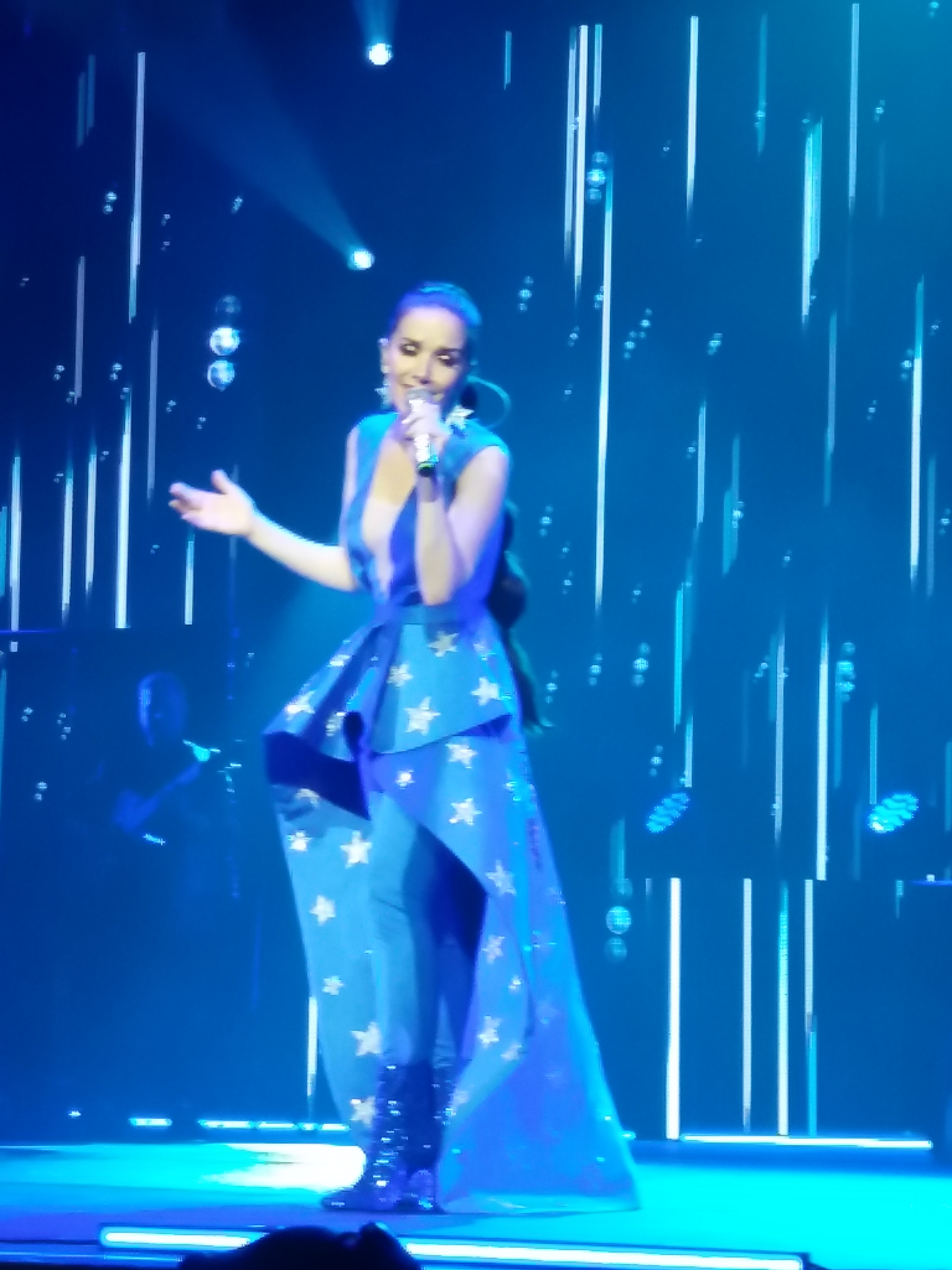
- Natalia Oreiro performing in Moldova during the Unforgettable Tour (2019).
- Concert tours: 7
- Promotional concerts: 1
- Festival concert: 8
- Award shows: 35
- Television shows and specials: 93

Uruguayan singer Natalia Oreiro has embarked on seven concert tours. She has also performed live at various award ceremonies and television shows. In 2000 she embarked on her debut headlining concert tour, Tu Veneno Tour, which visited South America, North America, Europe and Asia due to the huge success of the telenovela Muňeca Brava (Wild Angel) around the world. The tour, which began in 2000 but took place throughout most of 2001 and early 2002, was Natalia's biggest and most successful international tour to date.

Oreiro's next tour was named Tourmalina by combining the title of her third album Turmalina and the word "tour". It took place between September and November 2003 and the concerts took place in only two countries: Argentina and Russia after declining the original idea of concerts in Hungary and Israel.

== Concert tours ==
List of concert tours, with the duration, number of shows, and descriptions
| Year | Title | Duration | Shows |
|---|---|---|---|
| 2000–2002 | Tu Veneno Tour | September 11, 2000 – March 16, 2002 (Worldwide) | 35 |
Tu Veneno Tour, Oreiro's debut concert tour, promoted her second album Tu Veneno (2000).
| 2003 | Tourmalina | September 30, 2003 – November 21, 2003 (Worldwide) | 10 |
Tourmalina, Oreiro's second concert tour, promoted her third album Turmalina (2001).
| 2013 | Tour Hits | December 9, 2013 – December 14, 2013 (Worldwide) | 4 |
Oreiro returns to the concert stage after eight years since she played her last concert in Haiti in 2005.
| 2014 | Nasha Natasha Tour | November 18, 2014 – December 16, 2014 (Worldwide) | 16 |
The tour comes one year after the successful Tour Hits. This time the tour took place only in Russian-speaking countries: Russia and Belarus. During the tour, the documentary film Nasha Natasha was filmed by Martín Sastre.
| 2016–2017 | Cumbia & Hits Tour | December 6, 2016 – May 7, 2017 (Worldwide) | 13 |
It marks Natalia's first tour in Argentina and Uruguay in more than a decade. It also took place in Russia. It promoted the film Gilda, no me arrepiento de este amor and its soundtrack.
| 2019 | Unforgettable Tour | March 16, 2019 – April 16, 2019 (Worldwide) | 17 |
It took place in Moldova, Belarus, Russia and Armenia. It was the first time that Oreiro had ever toured without her original band, but she had a new Russian band and dancers for the tour.

== Festival concert ==
List of festival concert, with the duration, number of shows, and description
| Year | Title | Duration | Shows |
|---|---|---|---|
| 1999 | Festival World Dance Costa del Sol | May 29, 1999 – May 29, 1999 (Málaga, Spain) | 1 |
| 2001 | XXIX Fiesta Nacional del Mar | January 15, 2001 – January 15, 2001 (Mar del Plata, Argentina) | 1 |
| 2001 | XLII Festival Internacional de la Canción de Viña del Mar | February 21, 2001 – February 26, 2001 (Viña del Mar, Chile) | 1 |
| 2001 | Festival de Corrientes | March 2, 2001 – March 2, 2001 (Corrientes, Argentina) | 1 |
| 2001 | Festival de la Calle Ocho | March 11, 2001 – March 13, 2001 (Miami, United States) | 1 |
| 2001 | Festival Internacional del Cusco | June 30, 2001 – July 1, 2001 (Cusco, Perú) | 1 |
| 2002 | XLIII Festival Internacional de la Canción de Viña del Mar | February 20, 2002 – February 25, 2001 (Viña del Mar, Chile) | 1 |
| 2018 | XXVII International Festival of Arts - Slavianski Bazaar in Vitebsk | July 12, 2018 – July 16, 2018 (Vitebsk, Belarus) | 4 |

== Performances on television shows and specials ==
List of performances on television shows and specials, with the country of origin and performed songs
| Date | Event | Country | Performed song(s) | Ref. |
|---|---|---|---|---|
| November, 1998 | Susana Giménez | Argentina | "Que Sí, Que SÍ" | |
| January, 1999 | La Movida Del Verano | Argentina | "Cambio Dolor", "De Tu Amor", "Que Sí, Que Sí" | |
| N/A, 1999 | La Movida Del Verano | Argentina | "Cambio Dolor", "Huracán", "Me Muero de Amor" | |
| May, 1999 | Sabado Sensacional | Perú | "De Tu Amor", "Cambio Dolor" | |
| May 24, 1999 | Viva el Lunes | Chile | "De Tu Amor" | |
| October 12, 1999 | Gala de la Hispanidad | Spain | "Huracán" | |
| January 6, 2000 | Carràmba! Che sorpresa | Italy | "03-03-456" (with Raffaella Carrà) | |
| August, 2000 | Susana Giménez | Argentina | "Tu Veneno", "Río de la Plata" | |
| August 22, 2000 | Videomatch | Argentina | "Río de la Plata", "Tu Veneno" | |
| September 10, 2000 | Videomatch | Argentina, Spain | "Tu Veneno" | |
| September 29, 2000 | Versus | Argentina | "Tu Veneno" | |
| October, 2000 | Susana Giménez | Argentina | "Cambio Dolor", "Tu Veneno" | |
| November 4, 2000 | Tele Amor | Perú | "Tu Veneno", "Me Muero de Amor", "Cómo Te Olvido" | |
| November 8, 2000 | De Pe a Pa | Chile | "Tu Veneno" | |
| December 4, 2000 | San Sto Spiti Sas | Greece | "Tu Veneno" | |
| December 7, 2000 | Na Kazdy Temat | Poland | "Cambio Dolor", "Me Muero de Amor" | |
| December 14, 2000 | Dáridó | Hungary | "Me Muero de Amor", "Huracán", "Tu Veneno", "Cambio Dolor" | |
| December 15, 2000 | MMTV | Slovenia | "Tu Veneno", "Luna Brava", "Cambio Dolor" | |
| January 13, 2001 | La Movida Del Verano | Argentina | "Tu Veneno", "Me Muero de Amor", "Río de la Plata" | |
| March 18, 2001 | Hogo Fogo | Czech Republic | "Cambio Dolor", "Tu Veneno" | |
| March 22, 2001 | Noche Abierta | Spain | "Tu Veneno" | |
| March 23, 2001 | Luar | Spain | "Río de la Plata", "Tu Veneno" | |
| April 24, 2001 | Amigos en la Noche | Spain | "Tu Veneno", "Un Ramito de Violetas" | |
| June 10, 2001 | Gala Murcia Qué Hermosa Eres | Spain | "Tu Veneno" | |
| June 18, 2001 | El Lunes Sin Falta | Chile | "Tu Veneno", "Un Ramito de Violetas", "Me Muero de Amor", "Cómo Te Olvido" | |
| N/A, 2001 | Susana Giménez | Argentina | "Tu Veneno", "Un Ramito de Violetas" | |
| August, 2001 | Poné a Francella | Argentina | "Tu Veneno" | |
| November, 2001 | Nace Una Estrella | Chile | "Tu Veneno", "Cómo Te Olvido" | |
| N/A, 2001 | Sábado Gigante | Chile | "Río de la Plata" | |
| N/A, 2001 | El Show de Pepito | Chile | "Tu Veneno" | |
| December 3, 2001 | El Lunes Sin Falta | Chile | "Río de la Plata" | |
| December 20, 2001 | Venite con Georgina | Argentina | "Tu Veneno" | |
| May 16, 2002 | Videomatch | Argentina | "Río de la Plata", "Me Muero de Amor", "Tu Veneno" | |
| June 5, 2018 | Europa Plus Radio | Russia | "United By Love" | |
| June 5, 2018 | Russkoye Radio | Russia | "United By Love" | |
| June 6, 2018 | OK Na Svyazi | Russia | "United By Love" | |
| June 7, 2018 | AvtoRadio | Russia | "United By Love" | |
| June 7, 2018 | Nochnoy Kontakt | Russia | "United By Love" | |
| March 20, 2019 | AvtoRadio | Russia | "Cambio Dolor" | |
| August 25, 2019 | New Wave | Russia | "Acapulco" (with Roberto Kel Torres) | |
| June 27, 2022 | La Voz Uruguay | Uruguay | "Mi País" (with Ruben Rada, Lucas Sugo, Agustín Casanova and Valeria Lynch), "Aunque No Te Pueda Ver" (with Álex Ubago) | |
| September 11, 2022 | La Voz Argentina | Argentina | "Quiero Todo" (with Lali and Soledad) | |
| October 13, 2022 | ¿Quién es la máscara? | Argentina | "Que Digan Lo Que Quieran" (with Roberto Moldavsky, Lizy Tagliani, Wanda Nara and Karina la Princesita) | |

== Performances at award shows ==
List of performances at award shows, with the country of origin and performed songs
| Date | Event | Country | Performed song(s) | Ref. |
|---|---|---|---|---|
| September 8, 2000 | Premios VIVA 2000 | Israel | "Cambio Dolor" | |
| December 9, 2000 | Český Slavík Mattoni 2000 | Czech Republic | "Cambio Dolor", "Tu Veneno" | |
| June 2, 2001 | Stopudovy Hit Awards | Russia | N/A | |
| July 24, 2016 | Premios Platino 2016 | Uruguay | "Garota de Ipanema" | |
| October 3, 2021 | Premios Platino 2021 | United States | "Quizás, Quizás, Quizás" (with Carlos Baute) | |
| July 9, 2023 | Premios Martín Fierro 2023 | Argentina | "No Es Mi Despedida" | |
