= La Voz (Uruguayan TV series) season 3 =

La Voz
- Season 3
- Hosted by: Noelia Etcheverry
- Coaches: Agustín Casanova; Valeria Lynch; Rubén Rada; Luana Persíncula

Release
- Original network: Canal 10
- Original release: 3 June 2024 – present

The third season of La Voz Uruguay premiered on 3 June 2024 on Canal 10. This season, Agustín Casanova, Valeria Lynch, and Rubén Rada reprised their roles as coaches from the previous season. Debutant Luana Persíncula joined as a coach this season, replacing Lucas Sugo.

Noelia Etcheverry debuted as the host of the program, replacing Natalia Oreiro.

== Teams ==
- Winner
- Runner-up
- Third place
- Fourth place
- Eliminated in the Semi-final
- Eliminated in the Quarter-final
- Eliminated in the Knockouts
- Stolen in the Battles
- Eliminated in the Battles

Coaches	Top 48 Artists				
Agustín Casanova					
Agustín Casanova	Noelia Martínez	Marcos Agüero	Joaquín Mendoza	Darwin Piñeiro	Josefina Caldas
Agustín Casanova			TBA in Battles		
Valeria Lynch					
Valeria Lynch	Esteban Lima	Cinthia Llusseppi	Anabel Llarena	Elvis Torres	
Valeria Lynch			TBA in Battles		
Rubén Rada					
Rubén Rada	Nicolás Delafono	Graciela Montes	Guzmán Methol	Farala Estrugo	Dante Izquierdo
Rubén Rada			TBA in Battles		
Luana Persíncula					
Luana Persíncula	Martina Glattli	Michel Cuadro	Evangelina Arnaldo	Michelle Viquez	
Luana Persíncula			TBA in Battles		
Note: Italicized names are stolen contestants (names struck through within former teams).

== Blind auditions ==
The show began with the Blind Auditions on 3 June 2024. In each audition, an artist sings their piece in front of the coaches, whose chairs are facing the audience. If a coach is interested in working with the artist, they may press their button to face the artist. If only one coach presses the button, the artist automatically becomes part of their team. If multiple coaches turn, they will compete for the artist, who will decide which team they will join. This season, the "block" buttons were added. Each coach received three possibilities to 'block' another coach to prevent that coach from being chosen by the artist.

Blind auditions color key
✔	Coach pressed "I WANT YOU" button
	Artist elected to join this coach's team
	Artist defaulted to this coach's team
	Artist was eliminated with no coach pressing their button
✘	Coach pressed "I WANT YOU" button, but was blocked by another coach from getting the artist
	Blocked by Agustín; Blocked by Valeria; Blocked by Rada; Blocked by Luana

=== Episode 1 (3 June) ===
First blind auditions results
Order	Artist	Age	Song	Coach's and artist's choices			
Order	Artist	Age	Song	Agustín	Valeria	Rada	Luana
1	Esteban Lima	39	"Una lágrima sobre el teléfono"	–	✔	✔	✔
2	Nicolás Delafono	30	"Mujer amante"	–	–	✔	–
3	Martina Glattli	19	"Take My Breath Away"	✘	✔	✔	✔
4	María Cayetano	26	"La fuerza del engaño"	–	–	–	–
5	Richard Méndez	62	"Te quiero tanto"	–	–	–	–
6	Noelia Martínez	24	"Marinero de luces"	✔	–	✔	–
7	Marcos Agüero	25	"Y, ¿Si Fuera Ella?"	✔	✔	✔	✘

=== Episode 2 (10 June) ===
Second blind auditions results
Order	Artist	Age	Song	Coach's and artist's choices			
Order	Artist	Age	Song	Agustín	Valeria	Rada	Luana
1	Cinthia Llusseppi	39	"Rolling in the Deep"	✔	✔	✔	✔
2	Guillermo Rodal	—	"Mi historia entre tus dedos"	–	–	–	–
3	Graciela Montes	71	"Volver"	✔	✘	✔	✔
4	Alfonsina González	21	"Mi Primer Millón"	–	–	–	–
5	Michel Cuadro	27	"Cuando acaba el placer"	✘	✔	✔	✔
6	Joaquín Mendoza	22	"Hawái"	✔	–	–	–
7	Guzmán Methol	25	"September"	–	–	✔	–

=== Episode 3 (17 June) ===
Third blind auditions results
Order	Artist	Age	Song	Coach's and artist's choices			
Order	Artist	Age	Song	Agustín	Valeria	Rada	Luana
1	Darwin Piñeiro	—	"Llora mi garganta"	✔	✔	✔	✔
2	Naty Busiello	—	"Piel Morena"	–	–	–	–
3	Evangelina Arnaldo	—	"Llegaremos a tiempo"	✔	–	✔	✔
4	Rodrigo Jaureguy	—	"Me Voy"	–	–	–	–
5	Farala Estrugo	—	"Total Eclipse of the Heart"	–	–	✔	–
6	Evelyn Reyes	—	"Se me ha perdido un corazón"	–	–	–	–
7	Anabel Llarena	—	"I Will Always Love You"	✔	✔	✔	✔

=== Episode 4 (24 June) ===
Fourth blind auditions results
Order	Artist	Age	Song	Coach's and artist's choices			
Order	Artist	Age	Song	Agustín	Valeria	Rada	Luana
1	Nadia Suárez	37	«Azúcar Amargo»	—	—	—	—
2	Michelle Viquez	20	«Highway to Hell»	✘	✘		
3							
4							
5							
6							
7							
