= Felipe Rubini =

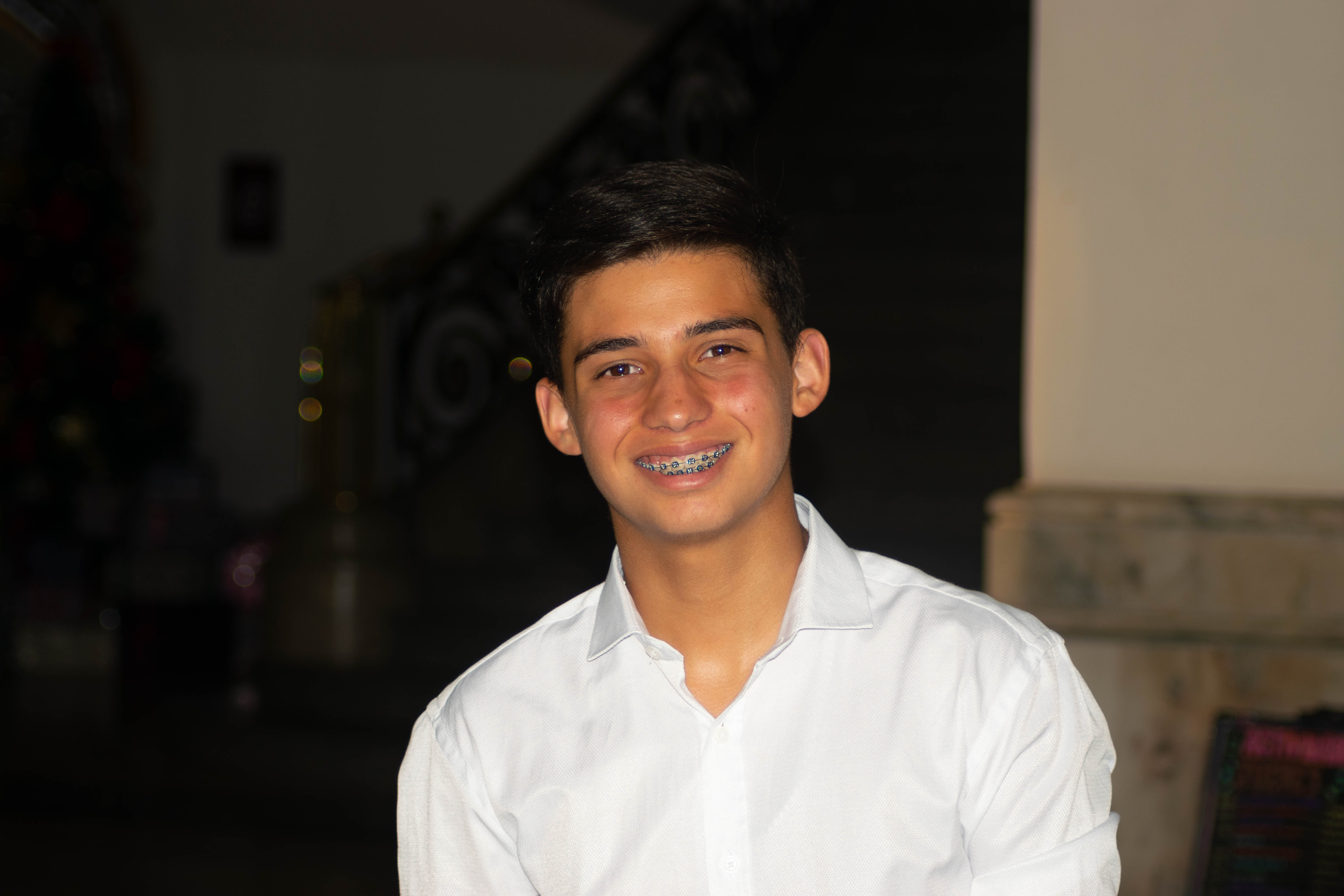
- Felipe Rubini in 2023.
- Born: Felipe Rubini Bertran; 20 October 2008 (age 17); Montevideo, Uruguay
- Occupations: student, musician, composer, pianist
- Parent(s): Solsiré Bertran; Federico Rubin
- Awards: National Piano Competition of Uruguay
- Musical career
- Instrument: piano
- Label: Montevideo Music Group

Felipe Rubini (Montevideo, 20 October 2008) is a Uruguayan student, musician, composer and pianist.

Son of Solsiré Bertran and Federico Rubini. From a very early age he began to study music and piano. He was the winner of the Concurso Nacional de Piano de Uruguay (National Piano Competition of Uruguay) in 2021, held at the Vaz Ferreira Sodre Auditorium.

He performed at the Argentino Hotel, Carrasco International Airport, Antel Arena, Sala Zitarrosa, etc.

He was on Susana Giménez's television show, and A solas con Lucas Sugo music program. He was a contestant and semifinalist in the international format version of the talent television show Got Talent Uruguay in Channel 10.

Rubini share stages and collaborations with Uruguayan violinist Edison Mouriño, musician Lucas Sugo, Luana Persíncula, Jorge Nasser, Alejandro Spuntone, etc.

== Award ==
- 2021, National Piano Competition of Uruguay.

== Television ==
- 2019, Susana Giménez in Telefe.
- 2020, A solas con Lucas Sugo
- 2021, Got Talent Uruguay in Channel 10.
- 2023, Desayunos informales in Teledoce.
- 2023, La mañana en casa a Channel 10.

== Simple ==
- 2020, Tree of life
- 2020, Run for love
- 2020, My Moon
- 2021, Mi mayor bendición
- 2022, Selah
- 2022, Soy mejor (feat Alejandro Spuntone)
- 2022, Nudo en la garganta (feat Lucas Sugo)
- 2022, Roto (feat Mariano Bermúdez)

== Videoclip ==
- 2020, Tree Of Life (director Guillermo Dranuta)
- 2021, Run For Love
- 2022, Roto (feat Mariano Bermúdez)
- 2022, Nudo en la Garganta (feat Lucas Sugo)
