= La Voz Kids (Uruguayan TV series) =

- Genre: Talent show
- Created by: John de Mol Jr.
- Presented by: Noelia Etcheverry; Daniel Ketchedjian
- Judges: Agustín Casanova; Álex Ubago; Julieta Rada; Rubén Rada; Valeria Lynch; Luana Persíncula
- Country of origin: Uruguay
- Original language: Spanish

Production
- Production locations: LATU Events Center, Montevideo
- Running time: 90–120 minutes (inc. adverts)

Original release
- Network: Channel 10
- Release: 6 March 2023 – present

Related
- La Voz Uruguay; The Voice (franchise)

La Voz Kids (Spanish for The Voice Kids) is a Uruguayan singing competition television series that premiered on Channel 10 on 6 March 2023. Created by John de Mol Jr., it is part of the international syndication The Voice based on the original Dutch Version, as well as a junior version of La Voz Uruguay.

== History ==
On June 27, 2022, during the final of the first series of La Voz, the opening of registrations for young singers aged 6 to 15 for a new edition of the contest was announced. In the days that followed, it was formally announced that the network had ordered La Voz Kids, a junior spinoff featuring younger aspiring singers. In October and November it was confirmed that Agustín Casanova, Valeria Lynch and Rubén Rada —who had already served as coaches in the adults version in 2022— would be part of the show. It was also announced that Rada would be accompanied by his daughter Julieta in a double chair. In January 2023, Spanish singer Álex Ubago was confirmed as the fourth coach, and Noelia Etcheverry and Rafael Cotelo as the hosts.

In September 2024 the show was renewed for a second season. In May 2025, it was announced that Casanova and Ruben Rada would be returning for the second series, and that they would be joined by Luana Persíncula, who had been a coach on the third season of La Voz. Magician and presenter Daniel Ketchedjian was also announced as co-presenter, replacing Rafael Cotelo. On June 10, Channel 10 announced the second series of La Voz Kids would premiere on June 16.

== Coaches' timeline ==
Seasons
Coach	1	2
Agustín Casanova		
Rubén Rada ^{†}		
Julieta Rada		
Valeria Lynch		
Álex Ubago		
Luana Persíncula		

== Series overview ==
Season	Aired	Winner	Runner-up	Third Place	Fourth Place	Winning coach	Presenter	Coaches (chair order)			
Season	Aired	Winner	Runner-up	Third Place	Fourth Place	Winning coach	Presenter	1	2	3	4
1	2023	Sol Muñoz	Aldana Cardozo	Jalil Elías	Agustina Espina	Valeria Lynch	Noelia Etcheverry	Alex	Valeria	Rada & Julieta	Agustín
2	2025	Valentina Sosa	Santino Sosa	Juana Astol	—N/a	Agustín Casanova	Noelia Etcheverry	Luana	Rada	Agustín	—

== La Voz Kids Live ==
On May 10, it was announced through the social networks of the program, the holding of a concert entitled La Voz Kids Live in which some participants would participate, as well as the coaches. It was scheduled for July 2 at the Antel Arena.
