= Natalia Oreiro 2001 =

- Czech Republic Cover

Compilation album by Natalia Oreiro
- Released: September 17, 2001 only Czech republic and Hungary
- Recorded: 1998–2001
- Genres: Pop rock, Latin, dance-pop
- Length: 44.03
- Label: Sony BMG

Natalia Oreiro chronology
Tu Veneno (2000)	Natalia Oreiro 2001 (2001)	Turmalina (2002)

Natalia Oreiro 2001 is a kind of compilation that is issued specially for fans of the Czech Republic and Hungary. Published 17 September 2001 with Sony BMG.

== Album information ==
Between 2000 and 2001, Uruguay singer Natalia Oreiro, experienced unprecedented success in the Czech Republic and Hungary. She became the best singer for 2000, the soap opera Muneca Brava was also voted favorite soap opera. Natalia made gold and platinum sales of her albums, "Natalia Oreiro" and "Tu Veneno" in the Czech Republic and Hungary. She got prizes in various popular Czech magazines and won the 2000 Golden Otto prize as the best singer and actress. In 2000 she became the main part of the ceremony Czech Nightingale, where she sang two of her hits. In March 2001 two of her concerts taking place in the Czech Republic sold out. Thanks to all this success, her publishing company BMG Ariola CR decided to issue a special CD for Czech and Slovak fans. The CD bears the name "Natalia Oreiro 2001" and is subtitled "Fans Edition".

This special compilation is divided into three parts. The first part consists of Oreiro biggest hits. six songs were selected, two of them being her hits "Cambio Dolor" and "Tu Veneno". The second part of the compilation has four remixes of hits from the first CD "Natalia". The third part is interactive and is only on CD version that has five videos and other bonuses like computer's wallpapers.

== Releases ==
This special compilation for fans was released on 17 September 2001, and not only in the Czech Republic but also in Hungary.

== Chart performance ==
According to the Czech official IFPI charts CD was very successful in marketability. Many as 15 weeks, kept in the Top 40 and best placed to 13.position. Further six weeks to keep the CD in Top 80 charts marketability.

== Track list ==
=== Part I – hits ===
1. Cambio Dolor (4:01)
2. Que Si, Que Si (3:00)
3. Tu Veneno (3:00)
4. Río De La Plata (4:33)
5. Cómo Te Olvido (3:44)
6. Me Muero De Amor (3:55)

=== Part II – remixes ===
7. Que Si, Que Si (Little Corp Mix) (3:24)
8. De Tu Amor (Pumpin' Dolls Fashion Club Mix) (7:53)
9. Me Muero De Amor (2 Effective Remix) (4:06)
10. Cambio Dolor (Pumpin' Dolls Pool Party Club Mix) (6:10)

=== Part III – CD extra: video ===
11. Tu Veneno
12. Cambio Dolor
13. Cómo Te Olvido
14. Río De La Plata
15. Me Muero De Amor
16. Wallpaper for Windows

== Charts ==
Chart (2001)	Peak position
Czech Albums (IFPI)	13
Hungarian Albums (MAHASZ)	6
Slovak Albums (IFPI)	4

=== Year-end charts ===
Chart (2001)	Peak position
Hungarian Albums Chart	82
