= Edison Mouriño =

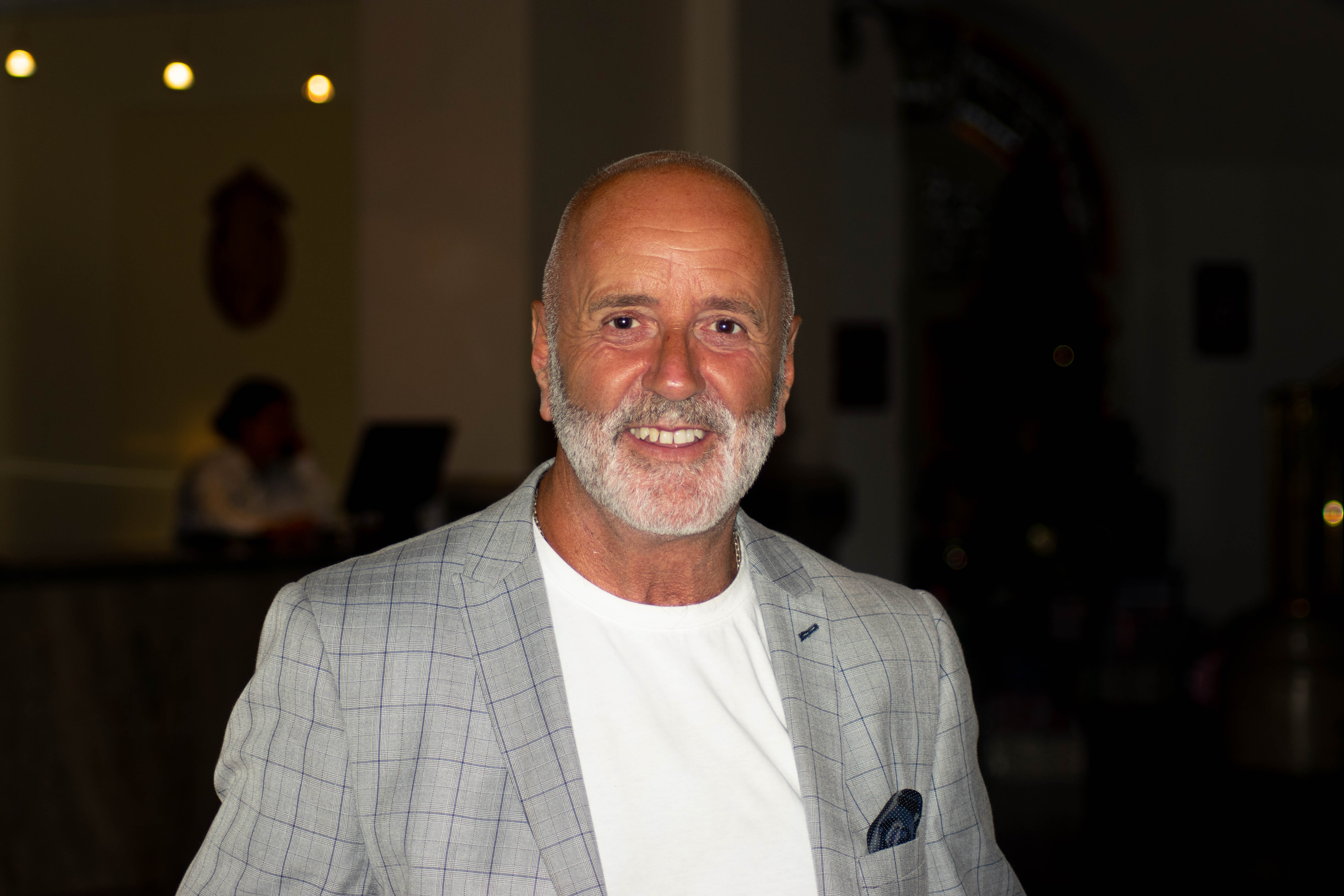
- Edison Mouriño in 2023.
- Born: 6 April 1955 (age 70); Montevideo, Uruguay
- Occupations: musician, composer, violinist, music planer, businessman
- Awards: Premio Nacional de Música de Uruguay
- Musical career
- Instrument: violinist
- Website: https://www.edison-mourino.com/

Edison Mouriño (Montevideo, 6 April 1955) is a Uruguayan musician, businessman, music planner, composer and violinist.

From a very early age he began to study music, the violin and is a composer. He was part of the Sodre Symphony Orchestra and the Montevideo Philharmonic Orchestra. Nominated for the Graffiti Award in 2014, and winner of the Premio Nacional de Música de Uruguay (National Music Award of Uruguay) in 2018, performed at the National Auditorium Adela Reta. He performed at the Argentino Hotel, etc. I share stages and collaborations with Uruguayan Paola Dalto, the musician Felipe Rubini, etc.

== Award ==
- 2018, National Music Award of Uruguay.
