= Luana Persíncula =

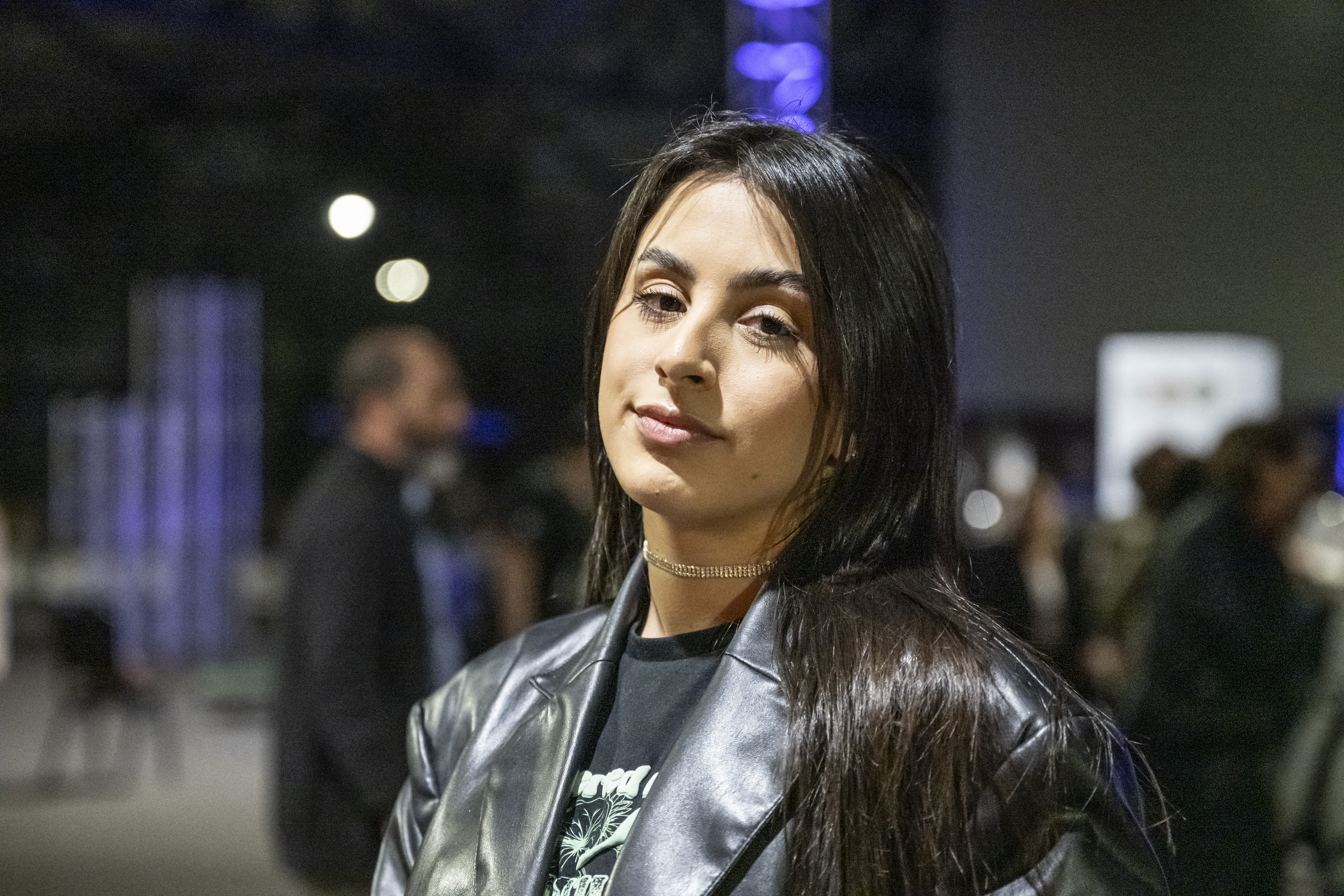
- Persíncula in 2023
- Born: Luana Persíncula Andino; 18 October 2001 (age 25); Colonia del Sacramento, Uruguay
- Occupations: Singer; television personality
- Years active: 2018–present
- Television: La Voz Uruguay (2024-)
- Children: 1
- Musical career
- Genres: Latin pop; cumbia; Uruguayan plena; folk cumbia
- Instrument: Vocals

Luana Persíncula Andino (born October 18, 2001), known mononymously as Luana is a Uruguayan singer and television personality. She began her career performing at folk music festivals and performing covers of well-known hits.

== Early life ==
Luana Persíncula Andino was born on October 18, 2001, in Colonia del Sacramento, to Óscar Persíncula and Soraya Andino. She is of Portuguese and Basque descent. She attended Primary School No. 82 and began singing from an early age in her school choir and in church. She was raised as an Evangelical Christian.

== Career ==
Persíncula began her musical career in early 2018 by releasing plena-style covers of Karol G's single "A ella" and Abel Pintos' "Oncemil", both of which gained millions of views on YouTube. From then on she began to perform at nightclubs, music festivals and private parties, which gave her wide popularity and earned her the nickname La Princesita (Spanish for 'The Little Princess') due to her young age.

In September 2018 she released her first single "Amarte no se olvida", which quickly entered Spotify's Top 50 in Uruguay. She soon released the plena-style cover of Beret's "Lo siento". In October, the Institute for Children and Adolescents (INAU) revoked her work permit for non-compliance with certain requirements for night work for minors, so her musical career went on a hiatus until she came of age.

After turning 18 in October 2019, Persíncula resumed her musical career, with the release of the Latin pop and urban singles "Mi primer amor", "Ocean", "Regreses tú" and "Soltarte" (featuring singers Lucas Sugo and Marcos da Costa). In 2020 she won the Graffiti Award for Single of the Year for "Mi primer amor". In addition, after the elimination of health measures due to the COVID-19 pandemic, she carried out her Íntimos tour through Uruguay alongside singer Marcos da Costa. In 2021 she released the singles "No me reemplaces" and "Andate" with Mariano Bermúdez. She also collaborated on "Sola y deja" with Valeria Gau and appeared on a remix of Tav Lust's "Amigue" with Clipper, Lu Canepa and Camila Rajchman.

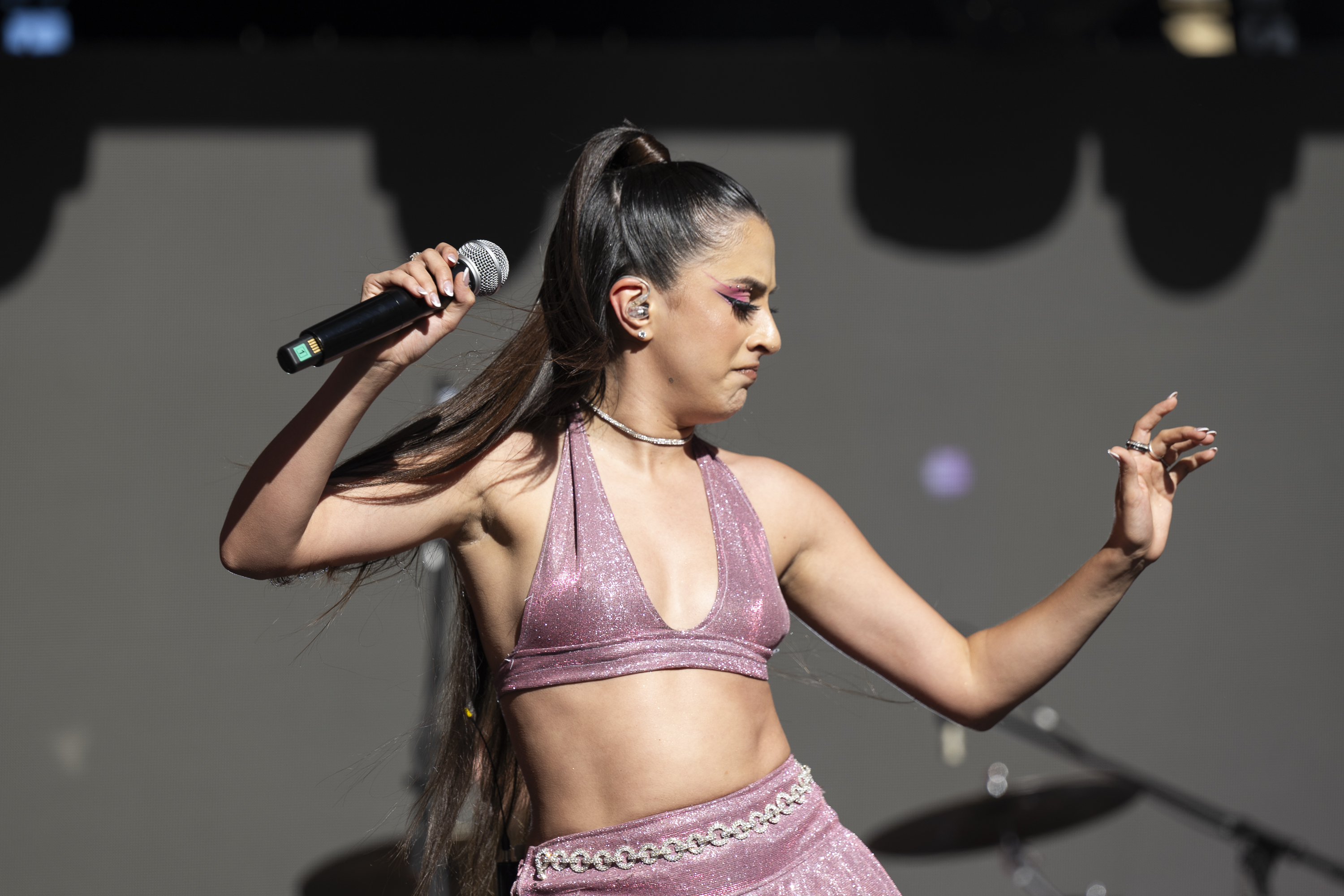
Persíncula performing in 2024

In March 2022, she was announced as one of the contestants for the third season of Channel 10's MasterChef Celebrity. She was the twenty-third eliminated, finishing in sixth place overall. In July she was featured on the single "Cuidado corazón" by Lucas Sugo and released "Ahora que te vas". In 2023, she competed on and won the third season of ¿Quién es la máscara? as "Tigress". In June of that year, she sang the National Anthem before the Uruguayan football team's match against the Nicaraguan team at the Estadio Centenario in Montevideo.

On December 2, 2023, she performed her first concert at the Teatro de Verano which she had several guest singers. In January 2024, she was announced as coach of La Voz Uruguay for the new season, replacing Lucas Sugo.

In January 2025, Persíncula collaborated with Argentine cuarteto group La K'onga on the single "Te Pido Perdón". The following month, she made her debut in the official Carnival competition as a member of the carnival group Integración, which presented Matria, las madres de la Patria, a show focusing on the role of women in the country's struggle for independence in the early 19th century On April 9, 2025, she was featured alongside Agus Padilla and La Deskarga on the remix of El Reja's single "Locura sin Techo". In May, she was announced as a coach for the second season of La Voz Kids.

In December 2025, she released her debut album, Icónica, which combines genres such as rock, plena, Latin pop, murga and Uruguayan folk music. It was followed by the singles "La Que Se Lo Queda Pierde", "Bandido sin Corazón", featuring Rodrigo Tapari; and "Enviciada", a collaboration with Argentine singer Aneley. In late May 2026, she appeared in a promotional video released by the Uruguayan Football Association announcing Uruguay's squad for the 2026 FIFA World Cup.

On October 18, 2026, her 25th birthday, Persíncula became the first Uruguayan female singer to perform a solo concert at the Antel Arena in Montevideo, selling out the venue.

== Personal life ==
In mid-2019 she announced that she was pregnant with her first child with her boyfriend, singer Marcos da Costa. On February 6, 2020, she gave birth to her son Tao. In October 2021, following media speculation about their relationship, the couple confirmed their separation.

In October 2023, Persíncula announced that she was in a relationship with singer Jona Suárez. The couple separated in September 2025 but reconciled in June 2026.

== Filmography ==
Year	Title	Role	Notes
2022	MasterChef Celebrity	Herself	Contestant; 23th Eliminated
2023	¿Quién es la máscara?	Herself	Contestant; Winner
2024	La Voz Uruguay	Herself	Coach
2025–present	La Voz Kids	Herself	Coach

== Discography ==
- Icónica (2025)
