= La Voz (Uruguayan TV series) =

- Also known as: La Voz Uruguay
- Genre: Reality television
- Created by: John de Mol Jr. Roel van Velzen
- Presented by: Natalia Oreiro; Noelia Etcheverry
- Judges: Rubén Rada; Valeria Lynch; Lucas Sugo; Agustín Casanova; Luana Persíncula
- Country of origin: Uruguay
- Original language: Spanish
- No. of seasons: 3
- No. of episodes: 44

Production
- Production company: ITV Studios

Original release
- Network: Channel 10
- Release: 7 March 2022 – present

Related
- The Voice (franchise); La Voz Kids (Uruguayan TV series)

La Voz (Spanish for The Voice) is a Uruguayan singing reality competition television series broadcast on Channel 10. Created by John de Mol Jr., it premiered on March 7, 2022. Based on the original The Voice of Holland, and part of The Voice franchise, it aims to find unsigned singing talent (solo or duets, professional and amateur) contested by aspiring singers, age 16 or over, drawn from public auditions.

== History ==
On September 20, 2021, it was reported that the Channel 10 had won the rights to The Voice Uruguay after doubling down in negotiations due to the fact that both Teledoce and Channel 4 showed interest in acquiring the rights. On October 26, producer María Laura García announced that Max Capote would serve as music producer for the show, in charge of producing the bases and supervising the songs. On October 28, during the central edition of Subrayado Rubén Rada, a singer, composer and percussionist with a long career, was announced as the first coach of the contest. Days later, on November 9, Argentine singer-songwriter was confirmed Valeria Lynch, as the international coach that the format demands. On the 17th, Lucas Sugo was announced as the third coach, and finally, a week later, Agustín Casanova, who had served as a judge in the two seasons of Got Talent Uruguay, was announced as the fourth and last coach of the competition.

On February 8, 2022, a sneak peek was released, in which a female figure was shown in the dark, and on the 17th, it was confirmed that Natalia Oreiro would be the presenter of the show. On Monday 21, the advisors of the coaches were announced: Camila Sapin, member of the band Closet; Victoria Ripa, singer of Croupier Funk and ex-judge of the reality show Master Class broadcast by Teledoce; Alejandro Spuntone, ex-vocalist of La Trampa and vocalist of Spuntone-Mendaro and Proyecto Bifrost; and Juan Dittrich, a vocal coach.

The show's air date was confirmed on 1 March 2022 through its official Twitter account. In August 2022, it was announced that the show commissioned The Voice Kids to air in 2023 along with the regular version.

== Format ==
=== Blind auditions ===
In the Audiciones a ciegas (Spanish for Blind auditions), the coaches listen to the participants from behind, without being able to see them. If they like what they hear, they can press their button to turn around and recruit them to their team. If more than one coach turns, the power shifts to the singer, who then decides which team they would like to be part of. Each coach will participate in the development of their team members, advising them, and sharing the secrets of their success.

=== Battle phase ===
In the Batallas (Spanish for Battles) each coach must choose two or three members of they team to compete against each other and show who has the best voice. At the end of each presentation, once the vocal duel is over, the coach decides who continues in the competition.

=== Knockout stage ===
In the third stage, a pair of participants from the same team perform at the same time, but individually. Each one has the possibility to sing a song of their choice, and they are also advised by special guests. After both presentations, each coach chooses a participant to advance to the next round.

=== Playoffs stage ===
In the Playoffs, the participants sing individually in team rounds, and each coach must save two, who advance to the next stage, while the rest will go to a public vote. Through telephone or SMS voting, viewers will save two more, thus leaving four participants. After listening to each presentation, each coach selects two from their team.

=== Live shows ===
In the fifth stage, each participant performs individually and live; the public chooses who goes to the next stage. Among the participants, each coach decides who will be given the opportunity to continue competing and who will be eliminated from the competition. In the next round, the spectators choose between the two remaining participants from each team, as well as each coach, whose decision is balanced with that of the public. In both the semi-final and the final, not only will individual songs be performed, but each finalist sings a duet with their coach. A public vote decides who will be the voice of Uruguay.

== Coaches and hosts ==
The panel were confirmed in February 2022 as Rubén Rada, Lucas Sugo, Valeria Lynch and Agustín Casanova, while Natalia Oreiro hosted the show. All four coaches and hosted returned for the second season that aired in 2023.

In January 2024, it was announced that Rada, Lynch, and Casanova would return for the third season. At the same time, it was announced via the show's Facebook that Luana Persíncula would debut as a coach, replacing Sugo. On 24 January, it was also announced that Oreiro would not return as presenter for the third season and would be replaced by La Voz Kids host, Noelia Etcheverry.

=== Coaches' timeline ===
Seasons
| Coach | 1 | 2 | 3 |
|---|---|---|---|
| Agustín Casanova | | | |
| Valeria Lynch | | | |
| Rubén Rada ^{†} | | | |
| Lucas Sugo | | | |
| Luana Persíncula | | | |

=== Line-up of coaches ===
Coaches' line-up by chairs order
| Season | Year | Coaches | | | |
| Season | Year | 1 | 2 | 3 | 4 |
|---|---|---|---|---|---|
| 1 | 2022 | Agustín | Valeria | Lucas | Rada |
| 2 | 2023 | Agustín | Valeria | Rada | Lucas |
| 3 | 2024 | Agustín | Valeria | Rada | Luana |

Coaches

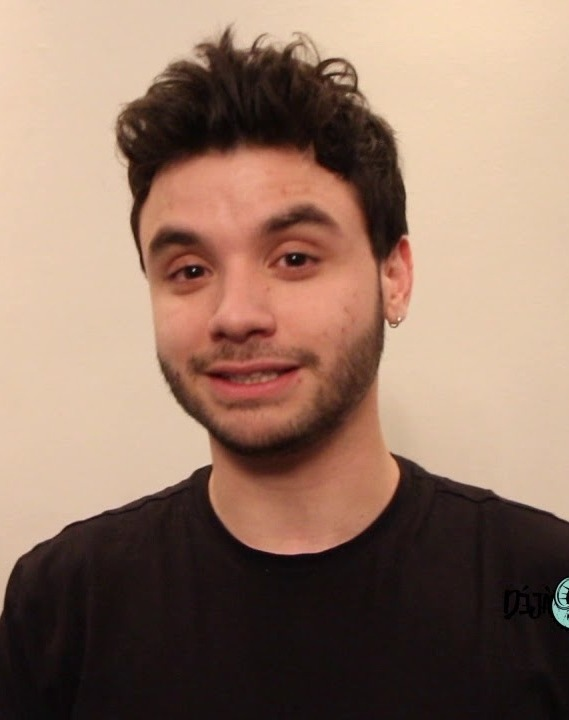
Agustín Casanova (2022–present)

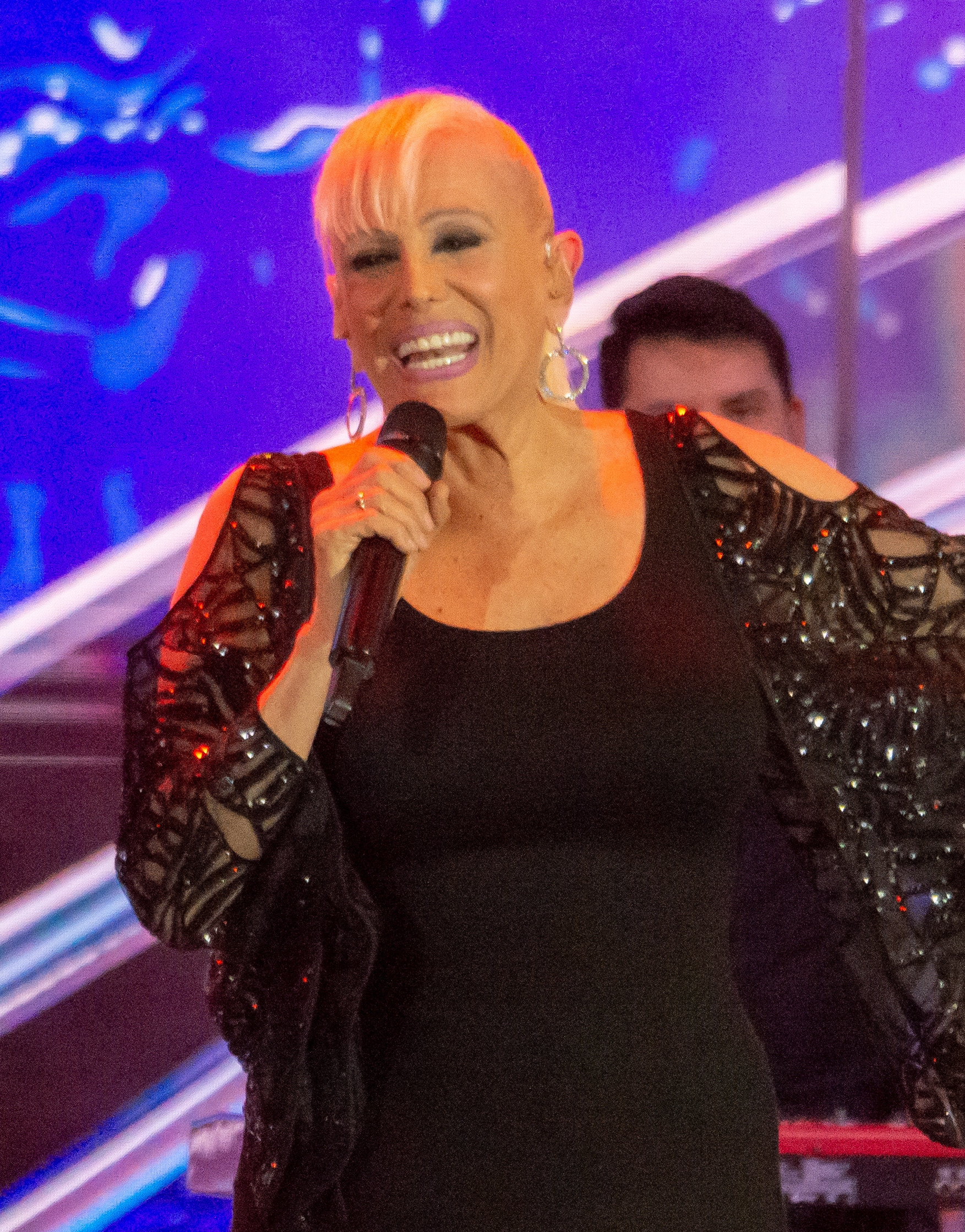
Valeria Lynch (2022–2024)

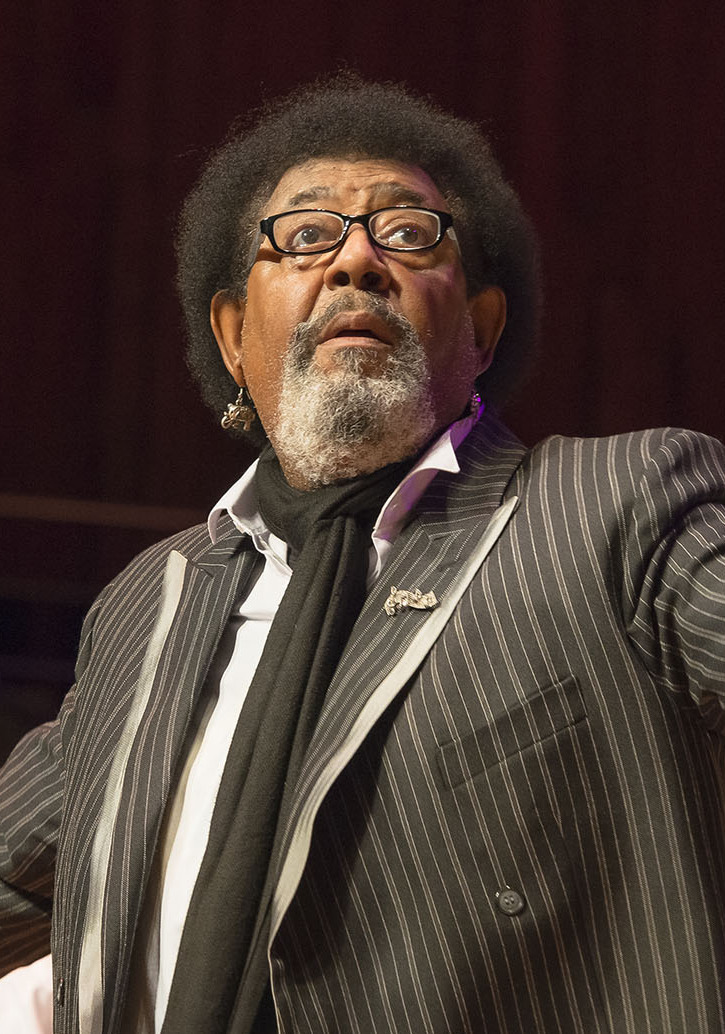
Rubén Rada^{†} (2022–2024)

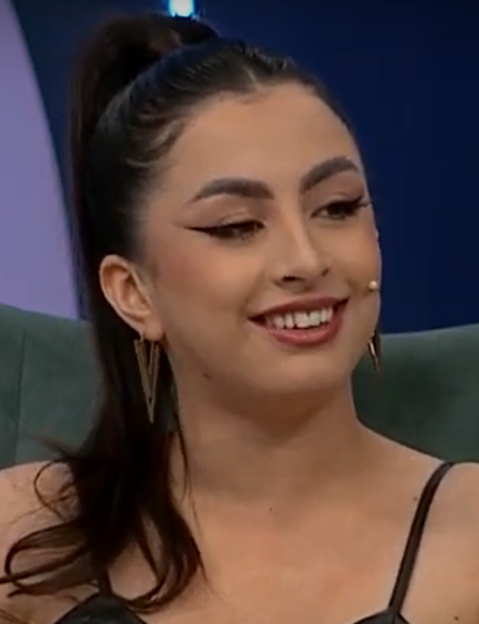
Luana Persíncula (2024–present)

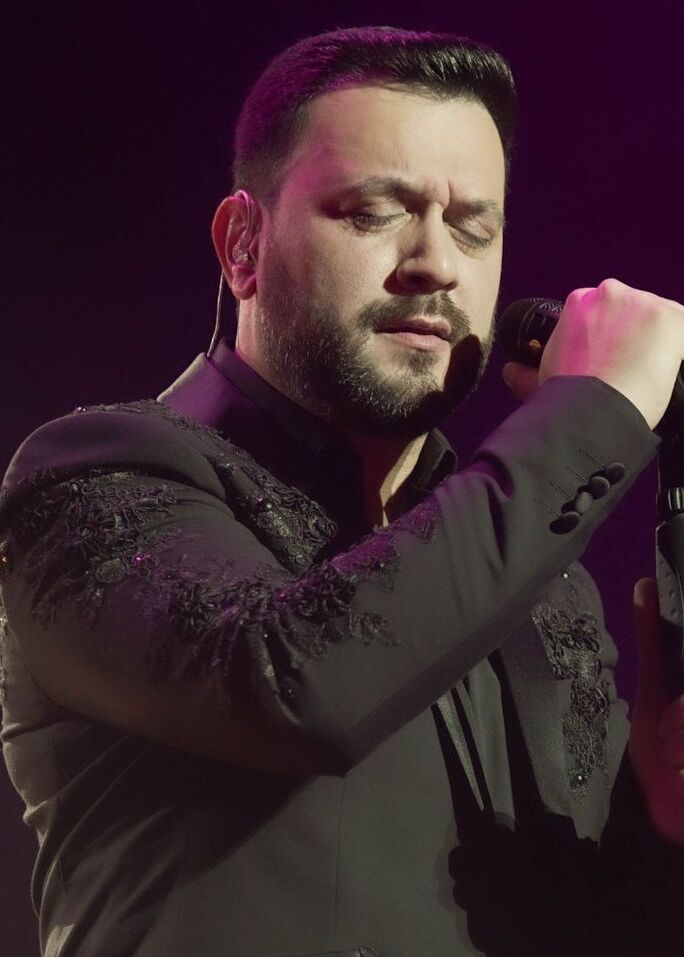
Lucas Sugo (2022–2023)

== Coaches' teams ==
- Winner
- Runner-up
- Third place
- Fourth place
- First names listed are the finalists: winners in **bold** and other finalists in italic.

| Season | Coaches and contestants | | | |
| 1 | Agustín Casanova | Valeria Lynch | Lucas Sugo | Rubén Rada |
|---|---|---|---|---|
| 1 | Paulina Liard; Guadalupe Martino; Sebastián Laventure; Miriam Barranco | Micaela Serrón; Sofía Oyarzábal; Erika Pereira; Esteban Montaño | **Óscar Collazo**; Yandira Castro; Criss Maguna; Mariana Sayas | Cinzia Zabala; Facundo Burgos; Nicolás Narváez; Iván López |
| 2 | Clara Hill Lavista; Natalia Santos; Paula González; Martina Díaz | **Federico Garat**; Valentino Pascual; Christian Izquierdo; John Vernazza | Santiago Buere; Carolina Favier; Daniel Grecco; Andrea Ortega | Vanessa Corrales; Ana Sofía Balbis; Camila Montero; Camila Torres |
| 3 | Agustín Casanova | Valeria Lynch | Rubén Rada | Luana Persíncula |
| 3 | **Marcos Agüero**; Sofía Martirena; Joaquín Mendoza | Anabel Llarena; Francisco Romero; Elvis Torres | Juan Amato; Nury Medina; Yessica Agustoni | Michelle Viquez; Christian Vega; Luca Scaboni |

== Series overview ==
La Voz series overview
| Season | Aired | Winner | Runner-up | Third place | Fourth place | Winning coach | Host |
|---|---|---|---|---|---|---|---|
| 1 | 2022 | Óscar Collazo | Micaela Serrón | Cinzia Zabala | Paulina Liard | Lucas Sugo | Natalia Oreiro |
| 2 | 2023 | Federico Garat | Santiago Buere | Vanessa Corrales | Clara Hill Lavista | Valeria Lynch | Natalia Oreiro |
| 3 | 2024 | Marcos Agüero | Michelle Viquez | Juan Amato | Anabel Llarena | Agustín Casanova | Noelia Etcheverry |

=== Coaches' results ===
Considering the final placement of the contestants who are members of their team (not the final placement of the coaches):

Coaches' results
| Coach | Winner | Runner-up | Third place | Fourth place |
|---|---|---|---|---|
| Valeria Lynch | Once (2) | Once (1) | — | Once (3) |
| Lucas Sugo | Once (1) | Once (2) | — | — |
| Agustín Casanova | Once (3) | — | — | Twice (1, 2) |
| Luana Persíncula | — | Once (3) | — | — |
| Rubén Rada | — | — | Thrice (1, 2, 3) | — |

== Spin-off edition ==
=== La Voz Kids ===
La Voz Kids is a spin-off featuring younger aspiring singers. It premiered on March 6, 2023, and featured Agustín Casanova, Rubén and Julieta Rada, Valeria Lynch, and Álex Ubago as coaches.
