= Lucila Rada =

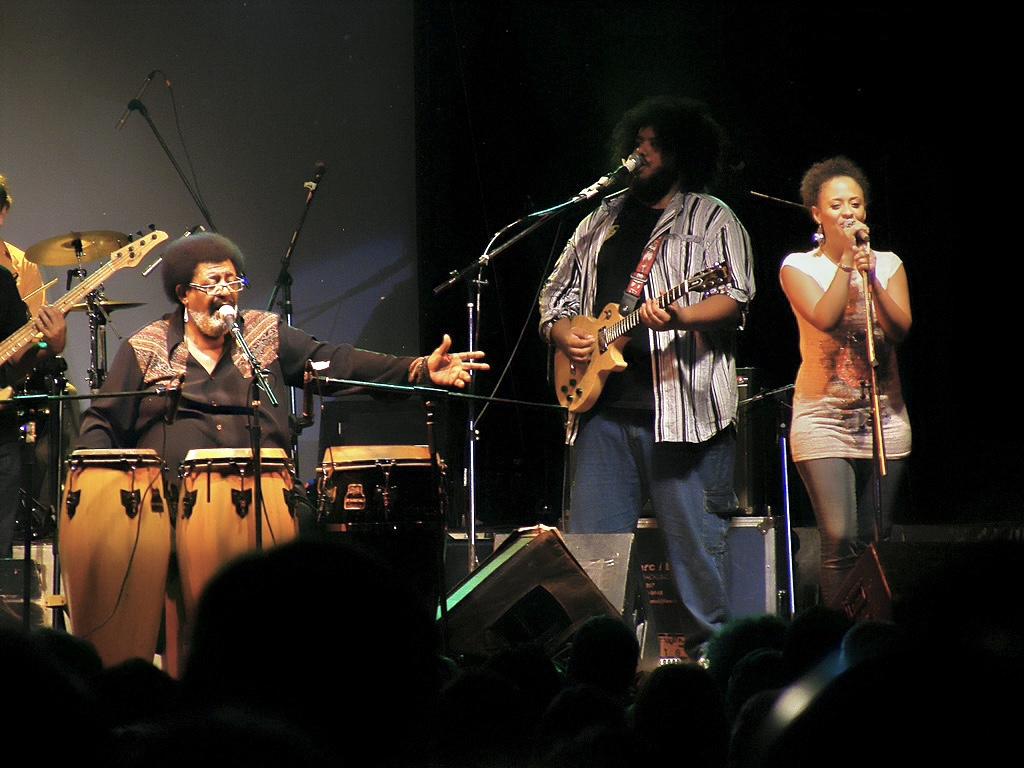
- Lucila Rada
- Born: Lucila Rada Vivanco; 16 November 1981 (age 43); Buenos Aires, Argentina
- Occupations: Singer; songwriter; actress; television presenter
- Father: Rubén Rada
- Musical career
- Genres: Candombe; Pop rock
- Instrument: Vocals
- Labels: Montevideo Music Group

Lucila Rada Vivanco (born 16 November 1981) is an Argentine-Uruguayan singer, songwriter, actress and television presenter.

== Early life ==
Lucila Rada Vivanco was born in Buenos Aires in 1981, the daughter of Uruguayan musician Rubén Rada and Argentine María Fernanda Vivanco. She is by maternal line of Basque descent. She has two half-siblings, Matías and Julieta. She was raised in Barrio Norte, where she lived with her mother after her parents separated.

== Personal life ==
In 2011 her son, Salvador, was born, whom she had with Santiago Stein.
