= Agustín Casanova =

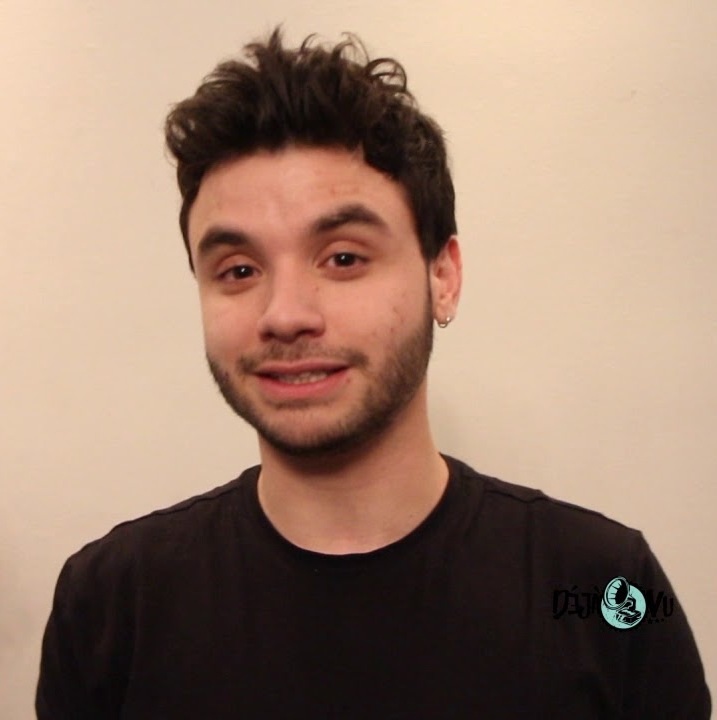
- Casanova in 2018
- Born: Agustín Daniel Casanova Sommaruga; 14 December 1993 (age 32); Cordón, Montevideo, Uruguay
- Occupations: Singer; songwriter; actor
- Years active: 2014–present
- Musical career
- Genres: Cumbia Pop
- Instrument: Vocals
- Member of: Márama

Agustín Daniel Casanova Sommaruga (born 14 December 1993) is an Uruguayan singer, songwriter and actor. He rose to prominence as the vocalist of the cumbia pop band Márama, which achieved international success and toured several Latin American countries and Spain.

The group's first album, Todo Comenzó Bailando, reached number one on the charts in Uruguay and Argentina, received the Graffiti Award for Best Latin Pop Music Album, and was certified double platinum by the Uruguayan Record Chamber. In addition to music, he has dabbled in acting, being part of the cast of the telenovela Simona, for which he received a Martín Fierro nomination for Best Newcomer and one for Favorite Actor at the Nickelodeon Argentina Kids' Choice Awards. He served as a judge on the television talent shows Got Talent Uruguay (2020–2022), La Voz Uruguay (2021–2024) and La Voz Kids Uruguay (2023–present).

== Early life ==
Agustín Daniel Casanova Sommaruga was born on 14 December 1993 in the Cordón neighborhood of Montevideo, the third child and only son of Daniel Casanova and Lourdes Sommaruga, a nurse. He attended Colegio Nuestra Señora de Fátima and later the Technological School of the Buceo, where he studied computer science. During his youth he worked in a locksmith and on weekends as an entertainer at children's parties.

== Career ==
=== 2014–2017: Márama ===
In 2014, Casanova accepted the proposal to be the vocalist of a new band, created by the producer and singer Fer Vázquez. Márama was formed by Ignacio Rodríguez (Percussion), Agustín Duarte (Drums), Lautaro Moreno (Keyboard), Alejandro Vázquez (Keyboard), Matías Besson (Bass), Martín López (Guitar) and Pablo Arnoletti. The group's first singles, "Loquita", "Todo empezó bailando" and "No te vayas" quickly became hits in several Latin American countries.

The third single "Noche loca" was a collaboration with Rombai, a group led by Vázquez and Camila Rajchman and also formed in 2014, with which Márama shared the rapid rise to fame, as well as aspects such as the age of the members and the music genre. Both groups reached top 10 in charts in Uruguay and Argentina, and toured together, performing in venues such as the Velódromo Municipal in Montevideo, the Teatro Gran Rex, and Luna Park in Buenos Aires.

In 2016, Casanova was announced as celebrity participant for Bailando 2016, the eleventh season of Argentine dance competition Bailando por un Sueño. Partnered by Josefina Oriozabala, he was the sixth dropout of the contest. In June he participated in the documentary film Márama-Rombai: el viaje that revolved around the beginnings of both groups and a joint international tour. A year later he participated in Bailando 2017, together with Florencia Vigna, but later resigned due to "personal reasons". In addition, the group performed at the Viña del Mar International Song Festival.

In late December 2017, it was announced that Márama would go on an indefinite hiatus, although they performed the concerts that were scheduled for the southern summer season of 2018. Later, Casanova declared that the dissolution of the group occurred due to Fer Vázquez, its creator "had a fight with the manager".

=== 2018–2020: Acting, first solo singles and Got Talent Uruguay ===
In 2018, he debuted as an actor in the Argentine telenovela Simona, playing Dante Funes Guerrico. Later, Agustín made a millionaire demand to Fer Vázquez, singer and producer of Rombai and former producer of Márama. In June he released his first solo single "Ando buscando" with Venezuelan singer Chyno Miranda, along with the music video. A month later he released "Bailoteame" with Abraham Mateo and Mau y Ricky.

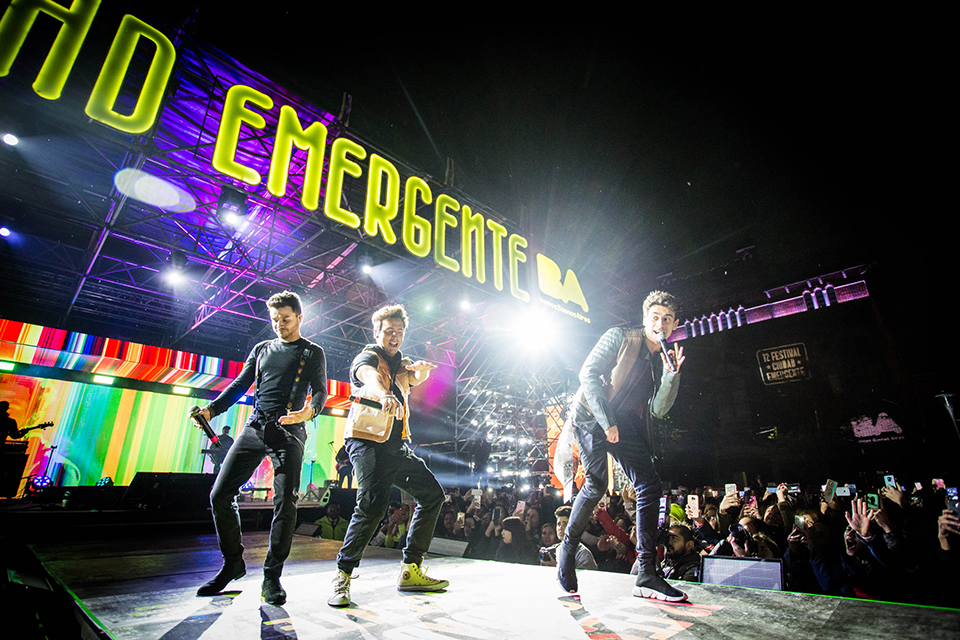
Casanova with Latin pop duo MYA in 2019

In November 2018 he released his third single "Sin Regreso". That year he also filmed a participation playing Ramiro Salazar in the second season of the television series Millennials, which would be broadcast the following year. On 4 January 2019, he released his fourth song, "Bye bye" and in September his fifth, "Tiri Tiri".

In September 2019, Casanova confirmed that he would be appearing as a judge on Got Talent Uruguay alongside María Noel Ricceto, Claudia Fernández and Orlando Petinatti. He was part of the panel in all three series of the show, broadcast in 2020, 2021 and 2022.

In December 2019, Uruguayan band Dame 5 released a joint single with Casanova called "Picoteo". That year, he also played Aladdin in the musical Aladin, será genial at the Teatro Gran Rex.

=== 2021–present: Márama revival and La Voz Uruguay ===
In September 2021 Casanova announced the revival of Marama with the release of the single "Ya no llora", which debuted at the third position on the Monitor Latino Top 20 chart, and sold out three shows at the Antel Arena in Montevideo.

In November, Channel 10 announced that he would be a coach on La Voz Uruguay, which premiered in March 2022. A year later, in 2023 it was announced Casanova would be a coach in the children's version of the show, La Voz Kids Uruguay alongside Álex Ubago, Valeria Lynch, and the duo of Rubén and Julieta Rada.

== Filmography ==
=== Film roles ===
Year	Title	Role	Notes
2016	Marama - Rombai - El viaje	Himself	Documentary film

=== Television roles ===
Year	Title	Role	Notes	Channel
2016	Bailando 2016	Himself – Competitor	Abandonated	El Trece
2017	Bailando 2017	Himself – Competitor	Abandonated	El Trece
2017	Mi marido tiene familia	Himself with Márama	Special participation	Las Estrellas
2018	Simona	Dante Guerrico	Main cast	El Trece
2019	Millennials	Ramiro Salazar	Special participation (season 2)	Net TV
2020–2022	Got Talent Uruguay	Himself – Judge		Channel 10
2022–2024	La Voz Uruguay	Himself – Coach		Channel 10
2023; 2025–present	La Voz Kids	Himself – Coach		Channel 10

=== Theater roles ===
Year	Title	Role	Notes
2018	Simona, en Vivo	Dante Guerrico	Main cast
2019	Aladin, será genial	Aladdin	Main character

== Discography ==
=== With Márama ===
- 2014: «Loquita»
- 2014: «Todo comenzó bailando»
- 2014: «No te vayas»
- 2014: «Una noche contigo» ft. Fer Vázquez
- 2014: «Bronceado»
- 2015: «Nena»
- 2015: «Noche Loca» ft. Rombai
- 2015: «Tal vez»
- 2015: «Era Tranquila»
- 2016: «Te amo y odio»
- 2016: «Lo intentamos»
- 2016: «Te conozco» ft. Fer Vázquez
- 2016: «Pasarla bien»
- 2017: «Vive y disfruta»
- 2017: «La quiero conocer»
- 2017: «Que rico baila» ft. Rombai
- 2021: «Ya no llora»
- 2021: «No Quiero Verte» ft. Hernán y La Champions Liga
- 2021: «Nunca Más»
- 2022: «Aunque te Enamores» ft. Luciano Pereyra
- 2022: «Todo a la Vez»
- 2022: «Resaca»
- 2022: «La Culpa» ft. Nacho
- 2022: «Nuestro amor regresa» ft. Migrantes
- 2023: «Bronceado Remix» ft. MYA and Robleis

=== Singles ===
- 2018: «Sin regreso»
- 2019: «Bye Bye»
- 2019: «2024»
- 2018: «Tiri Tiri»

Featured in

- 2018: «Ando buscando» (With Chyno Miranda)
- 2018: «Bailoteame» (With Abraham Mateo and Mau & Ricky)
- 2019: «Solito Solo» (With Lérica and Danny Romero)
- 2019: «Picoteo» (With Dame 5)

== Awards and nominations ==
Year	Award	Category	Work	Result	Refs
2016	Nickelodeon Argentina Kids' Choice Awards	Trendy Boy	Márama	Nominated	
2018	Martín Fierro Awards	Best Newcomer	Simona	Nominated	
2018	Nickelodeon Argentina Kids' Choice Awards	Best Actor	Simona	Nominated	
