= Daniel Ketchedjian =

Uruguayan magician and television personality

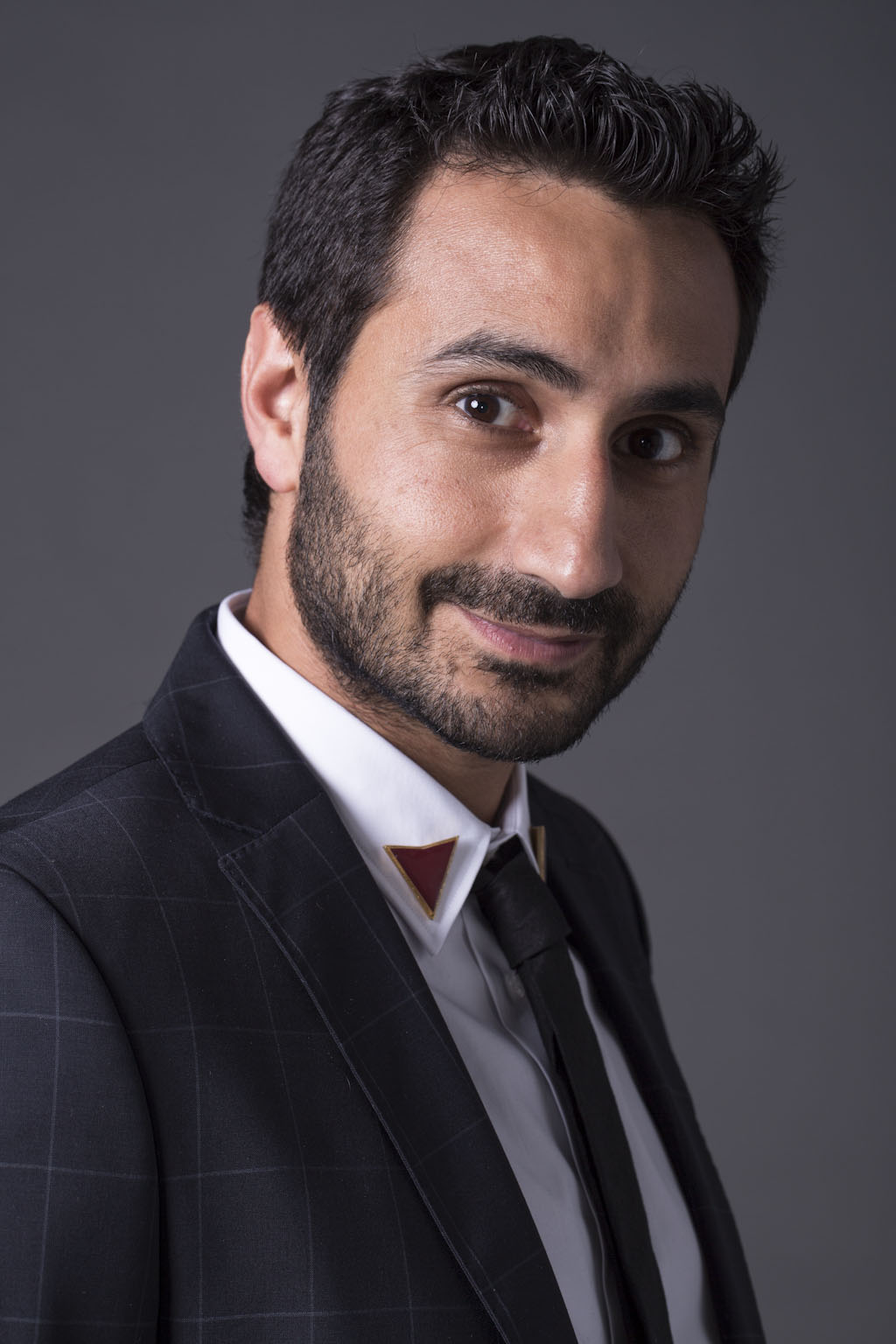
- Born: Daniel Ketchedjian Handalian; May 20, 1979 (age 46); Montevideo, Uruguay
- Education: University of Montevideo
- Occupations: Magician; television personality
- Spouse: Lissy Hernández (m. 2013)
- Children: 2

Daniel Ketchedjian Handalian (born May 20, 1979) is a Uruguayan magician and television personality

== Early life and education ==
Ketchedjian was born in Montevideo in 1979. Coming from a family of Armenian descent, his grandparents emigrated to Uruguay due to the Armenian genocide. He attended Colegio San Bosco, and graduated from the University of Montevideo with a degree in communication in 2014.

== Filmography ==
Year	Title	Role	Notes
1989-1991	Cacho bochinche		Magician
2002–2003	Dale con todo	Himself	Magician
2004	Bien despiertos	Himself	Guest
2013	Sinvergüenza	Himself	Magician
2018–2019	Todos contra mí	Himself	Panelist
2019	En cartel	Himself	Magician
2019–2020	Consentidas	Himself	Magician
2020	MasterChef Celebrity	Himself	Contestant; 14th Eliminated
2020	Penn & Teller: Fool Us	Himself	Contestant
2022	Tú sí que vales	Himself	Contestant
2023	¿Quién es la máscara?	Himself	Contestant; 6th Eliminated
2025	La Voz Kids	Himself	Cohost

== Personal life ==
In 2013 he married the lawyer Lissy Hernández. They have two children Joaquín and Josefina.
