= Turmalina (album) =

Studio album by Natalia Oreiro
- Released: June 1, 2002
- Recorded: January–May 2002 (Buenos Aires (Argentina), Miami, Florida (US), Montevideo (Uruguay)
- Genres: Latin pop, pop rock
- Length: 39:34
- Language: Spanish
- Labels: BMG Ariola Argentina, Sony BMG Czech Republic (Turmalina Kachorra Edition)
- Producers: Kike Santander, Andrés Múnera, Fernando "Toby" Tobón, Daniel Betancourt, José Gaviria, Jaime Roos

Natalia Oreiro chronology
Natalia Oreiro 2001 (2001)	Turmalina (2002)	Gilda, no me arrepiento de este amor (2016)

Turmalina Kachorra Edition
- Turmalina Kachorra Edition Cover

Professional ratings
Review scores
Source	Rating
Allmusic	3/5 stars

Turmalina is the third album by Uruguayan singer Natalia Oreiro.

== Background and production ==
Turmalina was produced by Latin maker Kike Santander and reflects and important step forward in Natalia Oreiro's musical career. The album was recorded in US, in the middle of the artist's worldwide tour. Natalia travelled with her musicians from Russia to Miami, from Miami to Prague, from Prague to Bucarest, from Bucarest to Miami for several months. Turmalina is a combination of rhythms such as rock, pop and some sort of reminiscent of the 70's and 80's sounds. It also combines murga, candombe and ballads. Everything carefully followed by guitar and percussion arrangements specially made by Uruguayan talent Jaime Roos.

On this album, Oreiro write and composed the songs: "Alas de libertad" (Wings of freedom), which is inspired by kids she met some time ago in the city of Jujuy, Argentina; "Mar" (Sea) tells the love story between a sailor and his girlfriend. Natalia also contributed to the lyrics of "Cayendo" (Falling).

"Que Digan Lo Que Quieran" (Let Them Say What They Want) is Turmalina's first single. "Cuesta arriba, cuesta abajo" is the song related to the soap opera "Runaway Lady". The album had a simultaneous release in Argentina, Chile, Uruguay, Czech Republic, Russia, Hungary, Greece, Romania, Israel and Korea. Nearly 1.800.000 copies of this album have been sold worldwide.

== Track listing ==
No.	Title	Writer(s)	Producer(s)	Length
1.	"No Soporto"	Andrés Múnera; Fernando "Toby" Tobón	Kike Santander; Múnera; Tobón	3:27
2.	"Que Digan lo que Quieran"	K. Santander	K. Santander; Múnera; Tobón	3:55
3.	"Amor Fatal"	José Luis Arroyave; Giovani Correa	K. Santander; Múnera; Tobón	3:07
4.	"Alas de Libertad"	Lyrics: Natalia Oreiro Music: Oreiro; Marcelo Wengrovsky	K. Santander; Daniel Betancourt	4:12
5.	"Canto Canto"	K. Santander; Gustavo Santander; Arroyave	K. Santander; Múnera; Tobón	3:08
6.	"Cayendo"	Lyrics: Oreiro Music: José Gaviria; Múnera; Tobón	K. Santander; Múnera; Tobón	3:08
7.	"Por Verte Otra Vez"	K. Santander	K. Santander; Múnera; Tobón	3:27
8.	"Cuesta Arriba, Cuesta Abajo"	Coti Sorokin; Matías Sorokin	K. Santander; Múnera; Tobón; Gaviria	3:41
9.	"No Va Más"	Tulio Cremisini; K. Santander; G. Santander	K. Santander; Múnera; Tobón	3:14
10.	"Pasión Celeste"	Jaime Roos; Raúl Castro	Roos	3:39
11.	"Mar"	Oreiro	K. Santander; Múnera; Tobón	4:30
Total length:				39:34

Kachorra edition enhanced CD bonus video
No.	Title	Director	Length
12.	"Que Digan lo que Quieran" (music video)	Nahuel Lerena	4:52

== Personnel ==
Credits for Turmalina adapted from Allmusic:

- Cristian Algañaraz – Engineer
- Amadeo Alvarez – Production Assistant
- Marcelo Añez – Engineer
- Daniel Báez – Engineer
- Mariano Barroso – Tambourine
- David Betancourt – Arranger, engineer, Keyboard Programming, producer
- Brendan Buckley – Bateria
- Ed Calle – Direcccion de Cuerdas, Guest Artist
- Coti – Composer
- Mike Couzzi – Engineer
- Tulio Cremisini – Composer
- Mike Fuller – Mastering
- Claudia Garcia – Coros
- José Gaviria – Arranger, composer, Coros, producer
- Martín Ibarburu – drums
- Jacqueline – Coro
- Juanes – Engineer
- Brian Kraz – Production Assistant
- Jose Lopera – drums
- Juan Cristobal Losada – Engineer
- Sergio Minski – Producer, Production Coordination
- Andrés Múnera – Arranger, Cuerda, engineer, Keyboard Programming, producer, Programming
- Alfredo Oliva – Concert Comedienne
- Natalia Oreiro – Artistic Director, composer, lead Artist
- Catalina Rodríguez – Coros
- Jaime Roos – Arranger, composer, engineer, Guitar (Bass), producer
- Manuel Sanchez – Engineer
- Kike Santander – Arranger, composer, Executive Producer, producer
- Richard Serotta – Production Assistant
- Andrés Felipe Silva – Executive Director
- Fernando Tobon – Arranger, Bajo Sexto, Guitar, Guitar (Bass), Guitar (Electroacoustic), producer
- Juan Jose Virviescas – Engineer

== Charts ==
=== Weekly charts ===
Chart (2002)	Peak position
Czech Albums (IFPI)	2

Year	Single	Chart position				
Year	Single	Polonia	Argentina	Russia	Czech	Espana
2002	Cuesta Arriba, Cuesta Abajo	#17	#19	#1	#11	#15
2002	Que Digan Lo Que Quieran	#2	#1	#1	#5	#5

== Certifications ==
Region	Certification	Certified units/sales
Czech Republic	Gold	10,000

== Release history ==
Region	Date	Label
June 1, 2002	Argentina	BMG Ariola Argentina
October 13, 2003	Czech Republic	Sony BMG Czech Republic
