= Lucas Sugo =

Uruguayan singer-songwriter (born 1978)

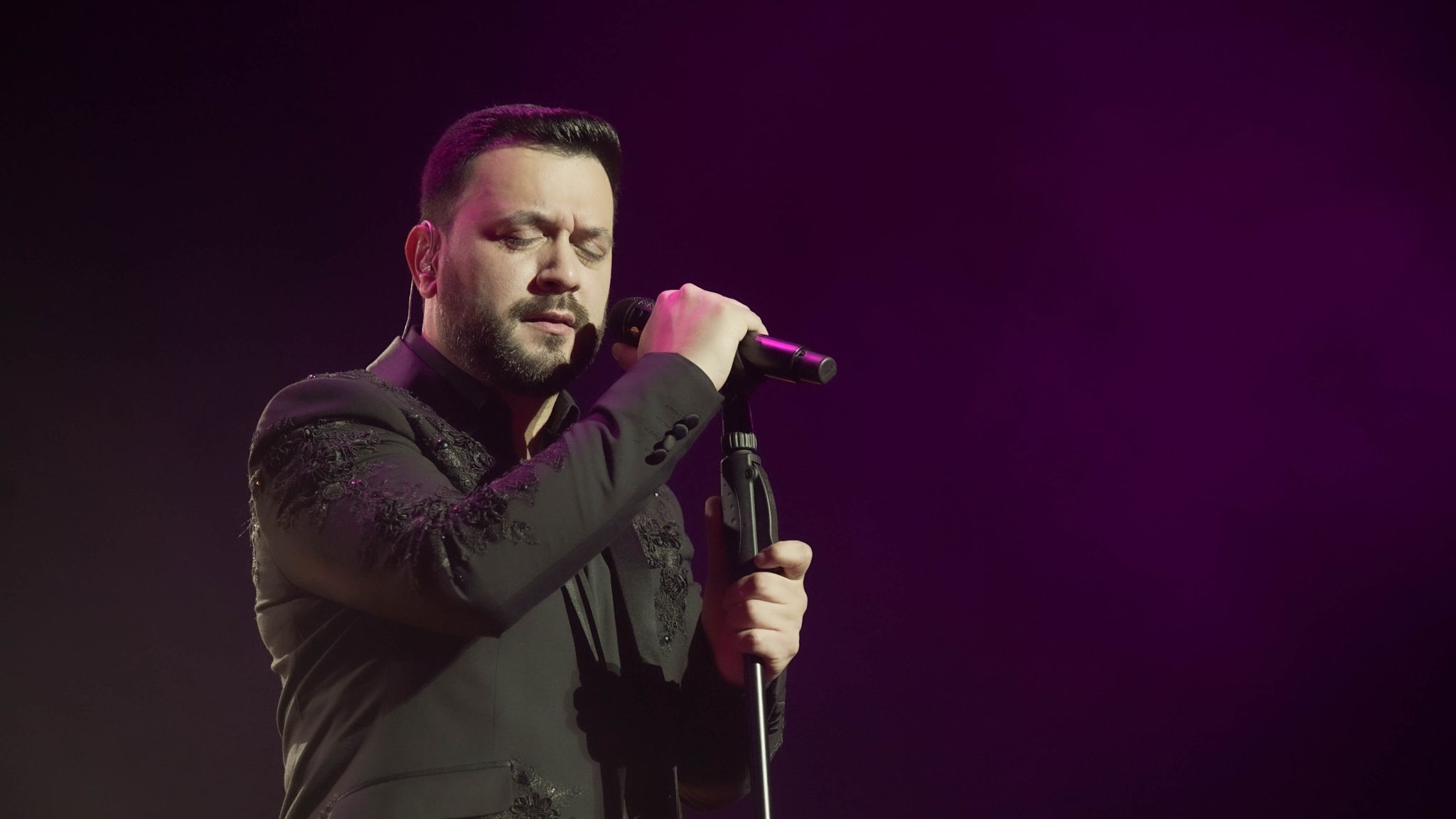
- Born: Lucas Alberto Sugo Rodríguez; 15 April 1978 (age 48); Tacuarembó, Uruguay
- Occupations: Singer; songwriter; composer
- Years active: 2002–present
- Television: La Voz Uruguay (2022–2023)
- Musical career
- Genres: Latin pop; cumbia; plena; folk cumbia
- Instruments: Vocals; guitar; piano

Lucas Alberto Sugo Rodríguez (born April 15, 1978) is a Uruguayan singer, songwriter and television personality. He began his career in 2002, as a vocalist and guitarist for the band called Sonido Profesional.

In 2014, Sugo released his single "Cinco minutos", which became a hit and brought him national and international recognition. He has performed in venues such as the Teatro Gran Rex in Buenos Aires and the Antel Arena in Montevideo. He has been awarded Gold, Platinum and Double Platinum records, and in 2020 the Graffiti Award for Best Artist of the Year.

== Early life ==
Sugo was born in Tacuarembó, but at the age of 2 his family moved to Rivera, on the border with Brazil. He is of Italian descent. His mother, Lucía Rodríguez is a composer of texts and melodies, and it was she who instilled music in him since he was a child. He did not have a bond with his father, whom he saw few times during his life. He has a brother, Martín.

He attended Primary School No. 1 in Rivera. At the age of eight, he entered the Eduardo Fabini School of Music. Later he attended the América Conservatory and the Melody Conservatory, obtaining the title of Professor of guitar, piano and singing.

== Music career ==
In 2002, before he began to work as a teacher, he was summoned by the band Sonido Profesional to replace Mario Silva as vocalist and guitarist.

In 2013 he began his career as a soloist, being accompanied by a band, of which he was the lead vocalist. In December of that year, he released his video clip "Lluvia", a song he sang during his time at Sonido Profesional.

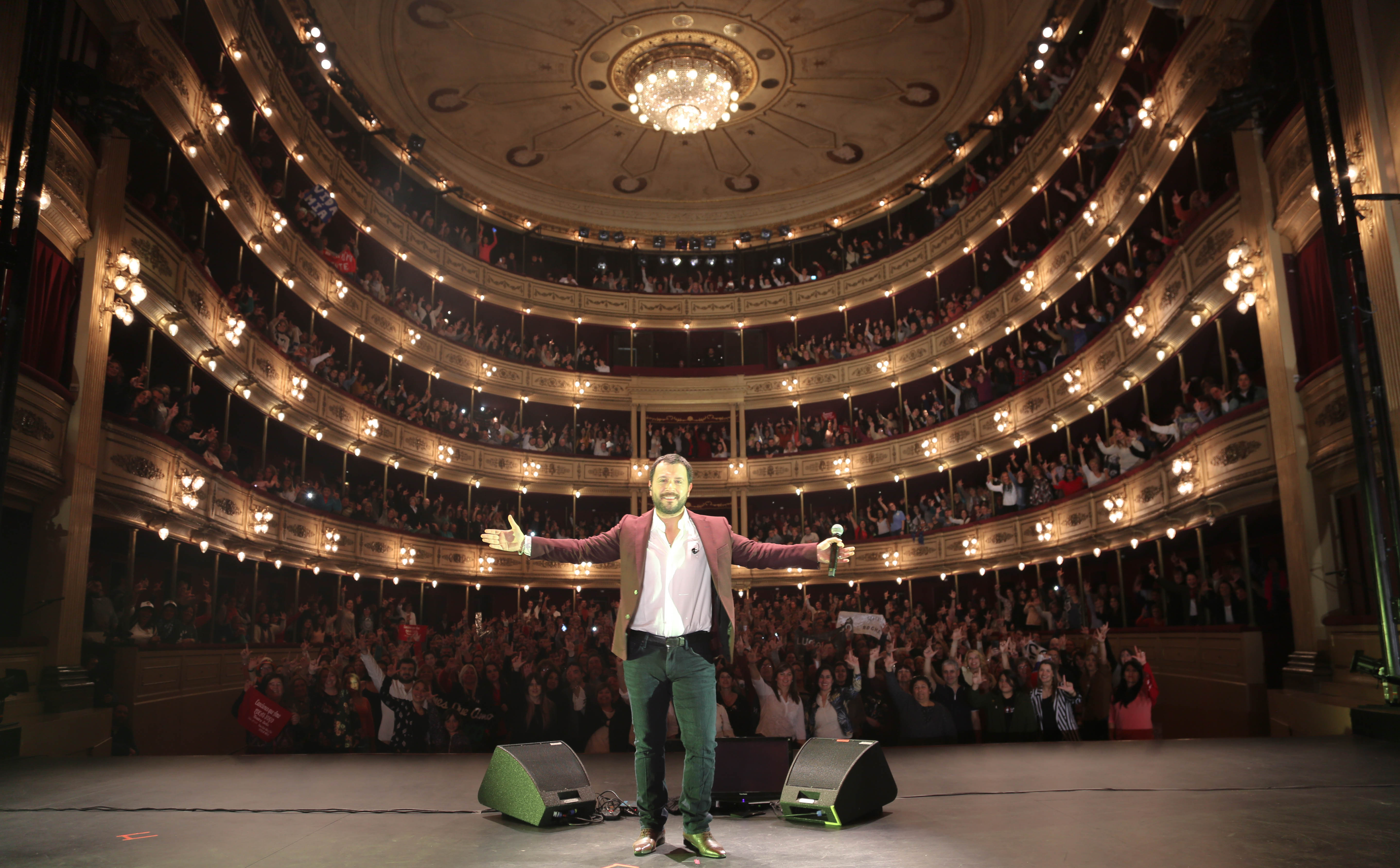
Lucas Sugo during a performance at the Solís Theatre, Montevideo.

On January 14, 2014, he released his single "Cinco minutos". In 2015, he released a new version of the video for the single. It was shot in San Ramón, and was produced by Indias Film and Montevideo Music Group. The song gained widespread recognition both in Uruguay and other Spanish-speaking countries. This popularity was further fueled by the fact that several football players sang it during the celebrations for Atlético de Madrid's of Atlético de Madrid in La Liga. In September 2019, he was the host of the talk show A solas con Lucas Sugo, in which he interviews well-known singers, both from Uruguay and Argentina, including Luciano Pereyra, Valeria Lynch and Agustín Casanova.

In November 2021, he was announced as a coach for the first season of La Voz Uruguay, which aired in 2022, alongside Rubén Rada, Lynch and Casanova. He became the winning coach after his contestant, Oscar Collazo, won the competition. He returned for the show's second season in 2023, but announced in January 2024 that he would not return for the third season due to scheduling conflicts.

In 2026, he was one of the performers on "Una gran alegría", the official song for Pope Leo XIV's apostolic visit to Uruguay in November of that year.

== Discography ==
- Sentimientos encontrados (2014)
- Vida mía (2016)
- Canciones que amo (2018)
- En vivo en el Solís (2019)
- Sentimiento y pasión (2020)

== Filmography ==
Year	Title	Role	Channel	Notes
2019	A solas con Lucas Sugo	Himself	Channel 4	Host
2021	El Legado	Himself	Channel 10	Special guest
2022–2023	La Voz	Himself	Channel 10	Coach/Judge

== Personal life ==
He is currently in a relationship with Antonella García, with whom he welcomed their first baby together, Isabella, who was born on December 8, 2021. He has two more children, Florencia Victoria and Lucas Agustín, from a previous marriage.

On 19 August 2026, Florencia, a medical student, died at the age of 23 after being diagnosed with cancer in early 2025.
