= Noelia Etcheverry =

Uruguayan television presenter

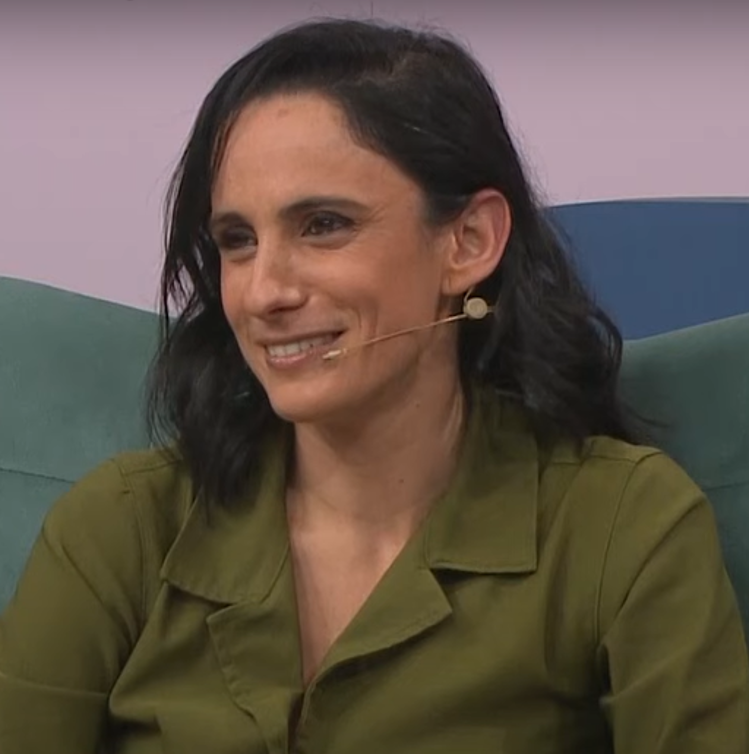
- Etcheverry in 2024
- Born: Noelia Etcheverry Daset; 31 March 1986 (age 40); Trinidad, Uruguay
- Education: University of the Republic
- Occupation: Television presenter
- Years active: 2005–present
- Children: 1

María Noelia Etcheverry Daset (born 31 March 1986) is a Uruguayan television presenter. Known for her television work with Channel 10, she has presented Sonríe, te estamos grabando (2022–present), La Voz Kids (2023–2025), La Voz (2024) and MasterChef (2026–present).

At the age of 15, she hosted a cultural program on local television in her hometown. She has worked as a production assistant, editor and reporter on different television programs, and has covered the Uruguayan Carnival. In 2018 she was recognized as "woman of the year" of the Flores Department.

== Early life ==
Etcheverry was born in Trinidad, Flores Department, the younger of two children of Diego Etcheverry, and Graciela Daset, a nurse. She is of Basque descent. She was educated at Primary School No. 31 and at Liceo No. 2.

At the age of 13 she performed the opening act at a Los Nocheros concert, and since then she began singing at events in her hometown. In 2004, at the age of 17, she moved to Montevideo to study a degree in international relations. However, she dropped out, and instead obtained a Licenciate in Communication from the University of the Republic.

== Career ==
In 2005, Etcheverry won the National Talent for Television contest organized by Channel 10, and she began working at the network as a reporter for the humorous program La Culpa es Nuestra. She also appeared in a show called Desvelados which was on the air until mid-2006. She later took on jobs as a production assistant and reporter in different programs and channels. In turn, she worked in the communication department of the Ministry of the Interior.

In 2017, Etcheverry joined the morning show La mañana en casa as a reporter and replacement host, and the journalistic team of Subrayado. In June 2020, she began presenting the Got Talent Uruguay derivative show, Amamos el Talento alongside Annasofia Faccello, who would leave weeks later, being replaced by Kairo Herrera.

In March 2022 Etcheverry replaced María Noel Marrone in hosting the Channel 10 humor and interview program Sonríe, te estamos grabando, after Marrone departed in order to co-present the evening edition of Subrayado. In January 2023 it was announced that Etcheverry would present La Voz Kids alongside Rafael Cotelo. In late April 2024 she left La mañana en casa after seven years. In March 2026, she was announced as the host of MasterChef Uruguay for its seventh season, following the departure of Eduardo Gianarelli, who moved on to host Gran Hermano.

== Filmography ==
Year	Title	Role
2005	La culpa es nuestra	Reporter
2005–2006	Desvelados	Presenter
2017–2024	Subrayado	Columnist
2017–2024	La mañana en casa	Reporter
2020–2022	Amamos el talento	Co-presenter
2022–present	Sonríe, te estamos grabando	Co-presenter
2023; 2025	La Voz Kids	Presenter
2024	La Voz	Presenter
2026–present	MasterChef	Presenter

== Personal life ==
Etcheverry is in a relationship with the cameraman Fabricio Fernández. She gave birth to her daughter, Olivia on April 12, 2021.

In her teens she earned a degree as a piano teacher.
