= Basque Uruguayans =

Ethnic group in Uruguay

Basque Uruguayans (Spanish: Vascos Uruguayos; Basque: Uruguaiko Eskaldunak) are citizens of Uruguay who are of Basque ancestry.

Although this figure does not imply Basque descent for each individual, it is estimated that up to 10% of Uruguay's population has at least one parent with a Basque surname. The first wave of Basque immigrants to Uruguay came from the French side of the Basque country beginning about 1824.

== Notable people ==
Past

- Atanasio de la Cruz Aguirre (1801–1875), politician, President of the Republic
- Gonzalo Aguirre (1940-2021, lawyer, jurist and politician, Vice President of the Republic
- Juan José de Amézaga (1881–1956), lawyer, politician, President of the Republic
- Carlos Anaya (1777–1862), politician, historian, President of the Republic
- Rodney Arismendi (1913–1989), Communist ideologue and politician
- Alejandro Atchugarry (1952-2017), lawyer and politician, Minister of Economics and Finance
- Lauro Ayestarán (1913-1966), musicologist
- Domingo Bordaberry (1889–1952), lawyer, rancher and politician
- Juan María Bordaberry (1928–2011), rancher, President of the Republic
- Juan Campisteguy (1859–1937), lawyer, soldier, President of the Republic
- Daniel Chavarría (1933-2018), activist, writer and translator
- Martín Recaredo Echegoyen (1891–1974), lawyer, politician, President of the National Council of Government
- Eduardo Víctor Haedo (1901–1970), politician, President of the National Council of Government
- Juan Idiarte Borda (1844–1897), rancher, President of the Republic
- Dámaso Antonio Larrañaga (1771–1848), Roman Catholic priest and naturalist
- Jorge Washington Larrañaga (1956-2021), lawyer and politician, Minister of the Interior
- Bernabé Michelena (1888-1963), sculptor
- Domingo Ordoñana (1829–1897), rancher
- Emilio Oribe (1893–1975), poet
- Manuel Oribe (1792–1857) general, President of the Republic
- Inocencio María Yéregui (1833-1890), Roman Catholic priest, Bishop of Montevideo
- Alfredo Zitarrosa (1936–1989), singer and composer
- Alberto Zumarán (1940-2020), lawyer and politician

Present

- Antonio Alzamendi, footballer
- Marina Arismendi, politician
- Rodolfo Arotxarena, aka Arotxa, caricaturist
- Pablo Atchugarry, sculptor and artist
- Pedro Bordaberry, lawyer, former government minister and Senator
- Giorgian De Arrascaeta, footballer
- Roberto Echavarren, poet and translator
- Jerónimo Etcheverry, rugby union player
- Noelia Etcheverry, television personality
- Diego Forlán, footballer
- Joaquín Izuibejeres, basketball player
- Joaquín Jaunsolo, rugby union player
- Luis Alberto Lacalle, lawyer, President of the Republic
- Diego Laxalt, footballer
- Julián Legaspi, actor
- José Mujica, florist and revolutionary, President of the Republic
- Agustín Ormaechea, rugby union player
- Santiago Ostolaza, footballer
- Juan Manuel Tafernaberry, rugby union player
- Jonathan Urretaviscaya, footballer

== See also ==
- Basque diaspora
- Basque Argentine
- Immigration to Uruguay
