= Julieta Rada =

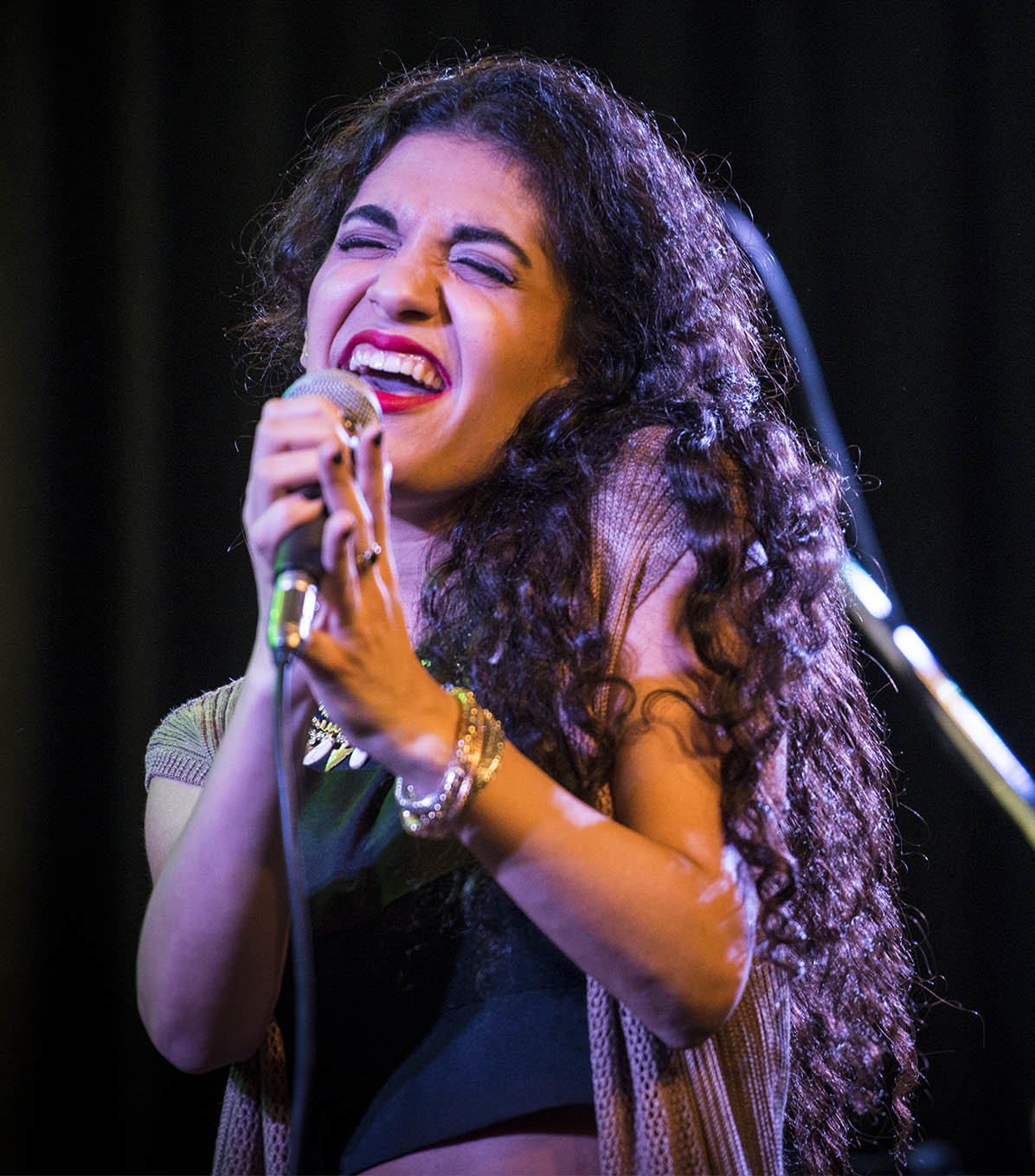
- Rada in September 2015
- Born: Julieta Rada Jodara; 25 May 1990 (age 36); Buenos Aires, Argentina
- Occupations: Singer; songwriter; television personality
- Years active: 2010–present
- Father: Rubén Rada
- Musical career
- Genres: Rock; R&B; candombe; jazz
- Instrument: Vocals
- Label: Bizarro Récords
- Website: https://www.julietarada.com/

Julieta Rada Jodara (born 25 May 1990) is a Uruguayan and Argentine singer, songwriter and television personality.

Coming from a family of musicians, she began singing in her teens. She released her debut album in 2012 and in 2015 she was nominated for the Latin Grammy Award for Best New Artist. In 2023, she served as a coach on La Voz Kids Uruguay with her father.

== Early life ==
Rada was born in Buenos Aires, Argentina, the third and youngest child of Uruguayan singer and percussionist Rubén Rada and the second with psychologist Patricia Jodara Leizerovich. Her Jewish mother was born in Argentina and traces her ancestry to Ashkenazi Jews from Turkey. Shortly after she was born, she moved with her family to Mexico, where she lived until she was five years old, when she moved to Montevideo. During her childhood she danced ballet, but had to give it up after a herniated disc at the age of 13. She attended Colegio Latinoamericano in barrio Punta Carretas.

== Career ==
She began studying singing at the age of sixteen and a year later to perform with singer and composer Urbano Moraes' group. In 2012 she released her debut album, Afrozen, which has guests such as Dante Spinetta, Hugo Fattoruso, Martín Buscaglia, and members of her family: her half-sister Lucila, her brother Matías and her father. That year she toured Uruguay, Argentina and Spain. In 2013 she won the Graffiti Award for Best Alternative Pop Rock Fusion Album.

In 2015 she released her second album Corazón Diamante, which combines the genres of candombe, funk, rock, pop and soul. It earned her a Latin Grammy Award nomination for Best New Artist, as well as the Gardel Award for Best New Pop Artist and the Graffiti Award for Best Female Solo Artist.

In June 2019, Argentine band Ciro y los Persas, released a joint single with Rada called "Por cel". Rada's third album, Bosque was released on 9 August 2019. It earned her the Gardel Award for Best Pop Artist Album and the Graffiti Award for Best Pop Album.

In November 2022, it was announced that Rada would coach La Voz Kids Uruguay in a double chair with her father.

== Filmography ==
Year	Title	Role	Notes
2023	La Voz Kids Uruguay	Herself–Coach	

== Discography ==
- Afrozen (2012)
- Corazón diamante (2015)
- Bosque (2019)
- Candombe (2024)

== Personal life ==
She dated songwriter and producer Nicolás Ibarburu from 2009 to 2017.
