= Rubén Rada =

Uruguayan musician (1943–2026)

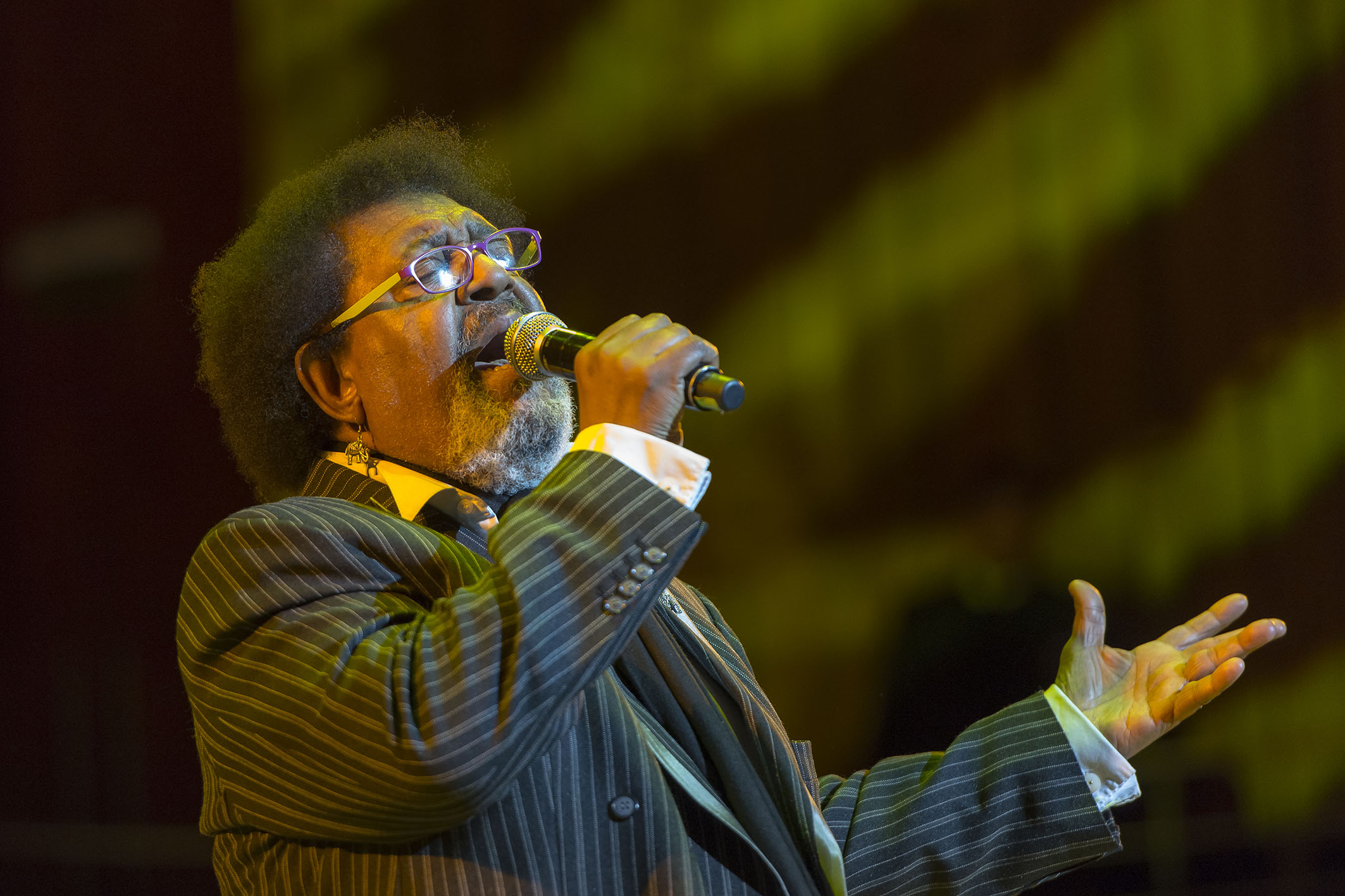
- Rada in 2015
- Born: Omar Rubén Rada Silva; 16 July 1943; Montevideo, Uruguay
- Died: 26 August 2026 (aged 83); Montevideo, Uruguay
- Children: Lucila; Matías; Julieta
- Musical career
- Genres: Candombe; Latin jazz; World fusion
- Instruments: Vocals, percussion, tamboriles
- Years active: 1955–2026

Omar Rubén Rada Silva (16 July 1943 – 26 August 2026) also known as Rubén Rada or El Negro Rada,was a Uruguayan musician, composer, percussionist, singer, actor, and television host. Widely regarded as one of the most influential figures in Uruguayan and Latin American popular music, he was known for his unique and varied style, blending Afro-Uruguayan traditions—particularly candombe—with rock, soul, jazz, and funk, samba and bossa nova, among other genres.

His musical career spanned more than 70 years, and he has been hailed as a symbol of Uruguay’s national culture. In 2008, he was honored as an Illustrious Citizen of Montevideo; in 2011, he received a Grammy Award for musical excellence; and in 2014, the Uruguayan government awarded him the Delmira Agustini Medal for his contribution to culture and the arts.

== Personal life and death ==
Rada was born on 16 July 1943, in the Palermo neighborhood of Montevideo to a humble Afro-Uruguayan family. At the age of two, he contracted tuberculosis, which kept him hospitalized for two years at Saint Bois Hospital due to a lack of antibiotic treatments, which had not yet reached the country at that time.

His mother, Carmen María Silva, was Brazilian, born in the border town of Santana do Livramento. His father, Raúl Rada, was a candombe drummer from the Ansina neighborhood and abandoned his family when Ruben was two years old. He grew up with his mother, his two brothers, his aunt, and his cousins, sharing a single room in the Palermo neighborhood, where he lived until he was 10 years old.

On 26 August 2026, Rada's family announced that he had died early that day after experiencing complications from pneumonia. He was 83. Uruguayan president, Yamandú Orsi, decreed a national day of mourning.

== Career ==
Rada began his career in the 1960s and co-founded the band El Kinto with Eduardo Mateo. The group is recognized for pioneering candombe beat and for being among the first South American rock bands to sing in Spanish while incorporating Latin percussion into a rock format. In the early 1970s, he formed Totem, noted for its fusion of Afro-Uruguayan rhythms with rock influences. Rada later collaborated with Hugo and Osvaldo Fattoruso in the United States–based jazz fusion group Opa, contributing significantly to the album Magic Time (1977).

In 1965, he and Eduardo Mateo formed the band El Kinto Conjunto. This was the first group in Uruguay to create the beat genre in Spanish and to fuse rock with Latin American musical styles. In 1969 the success of his Candombe song "Las Manzanas" ("The Apples") led to his first solo album and participation in the Festival of Popular Music in Rio de Janeiro, Brazil. A year later he formed the band Tótem. He recorded more than thirty albums.

In 1977, he traveled to the United States after an invitation by the Fattoruso Brothers to play with the group OPA. Over the next year, he performed with Tom Scott, Ray Barretto, Hermeto Pascoal, and Flora Purim.

In the 1980s, Rada relocated to Buenos Aires, where he led an ensemble featuring both Uruguayan and Argentine musicians. The group produced a series of recordings that combined candombe, jazz, and rock, a period often considered among the most significant in his career.

During the 1990s, he lived in Mexico, working as a sideman with various artists, including Tania Libertad. He also recorded three albums in the United States during this period: Montevideo (1996), Montevideo II (1999), and Rada Factory (unreleased).

He returned to Uruguay at the end of the decade, entering a period of broad recognition and commercial success throughout the 2000s in Uruguay, Argentina, and other parts of Latin America.

In 2011, he received the Latin Grammy Lifetime Achievement Award in recognition of his influential career and his contributions to the fusion of candombe with jazz, funk, soul, and other genres.

In 2013 Rada received Berklee's Master of Latin Music award from the Berklee College of Music.

In 2020, his song “El Ómnibus” was sampled by Freddie Gibbs and The Alchemist in the track 1985.Between 1991 and 1994, he settled in Mexico, where he worked as a composer and arranger for local musicians such as Mijares, Eugenia León, Stephanie Salas, and Tania Libertad. In 1994 he shared the spotlight with Sting and UB40 at the Palacio de Deportes in Mexico City.

== Discography ==
=== With El Kinto ===
- 1971: Musicasion 4 1/2 (De La Planta)
- 1977: Circa 1968 (Clave)

=== With Totem ===
- 1971: Totem (Sondor)
- 1972: Descarga (Sondor)

=== With Opa ===
- 1977: Magic Time (Milestone)

=== Solo albums ===
- 1969: Rada (Sondor)
- 1974: Rada y Conjunto S.O.S (Clave)
- 1975: Radeces (Ayui)
- 1980: La Banda (Sazam)
- 1981: La Rada (Sazam)
- 1982: En Familia (Sazam)
- 1984: Adar Nebur (Sazam)
- 1986: La Yapla Mata (Raviol)
- 1987: Botija de mi pais (with Eduardo Mateo) (Sondor)
- 1987: Siete Vidas (Sazam)
- 1991: Fisico de Rock (Sondor)
- 1989: Pa' los Uruguayos (Melopea)
- 1990: Las aventuras de R. Rada y Litto Nebbia (with Litto Nebbia) (Melopea)
- 1991: Las aventuras de R. Rada y H. Fattoruso (with Hugo Fattoruso) (Melopea)
- 1991: Terapia de Murga (Melopea)
- 1996: Botijas Band con Ruben Rada (Orfeo)
- 1996: Montevideo (Big World)
- 1997: Miscelanea Negra (Ayui)
- 1998: Black (Universal)
- 1999: Rada Para Ninos (Zapatito)
- 1999: Montevideo Dos (Big World)
- 2000: ¿Quien va a Cantar? (Universal)
- 2001: Suenos de Nino (Zapatito)
- 2003: Alegre Caballero (Zapatito)
- 2004: Rubenra (Zapatito)
- 2006: Richie Silver (EMI)
- 2007: Varsovia (with Javier Malosetti) (Zapatito/Oday)
- 2008: Bailongo (Sony)
- 2009: Fan (MMG)
- 2011: Confidence, Rada Instrumental (MMG)
- 2015: Tango, milonga y candombe (MMG)
- 2015: Allegro (MMG)
- 2017: Confidence 2: La Película (MMG)
- 2019: Negro Rock (MMG)
- 2021: As noites do Rio / Aerolíneas Candombe (MMG)
- 2022: Candombe (MMG)
- 2024: Candombe con la ayudita de mis amigos (MMG)
- 2025: Gamurgatrónica (MMG)

=== Live albums ===
- 1983: La Cosa se Pone negra (Sazam)
- 1992: Concierto por la vida (Orfeo)
- 2004: Candombe Jazz Tour (EMI)
- 2020: Parte de la Historia (MMG)

== Filmography ==
=== Film ===
Year	Title	Role	Notes
1974	The Return of Martín Fierro		
1983	Buenos Aires Rock	Himself	Concert film
1997	24 horas (Algo está por explotar)	Cook	
1999	The Life Jacket Is Under Your Seat	Sancucho	
2004	The Incredibles	Lucius Best/Frozone (voice)	Rioplatense Spanish dubbing
2014	Por un puñado de pelos	Machaco	
2019	Cara Sucia, con la magia de la naturaleza	Mono Vivaldi (voice)	Animated film

=== Television ===
Year	Title	Role	Notes
1998	Gasoleros	Liber	Supporting role
1999	Telecataplúm	Sketch actor	
2000–2008	El show del mediodía	Sketch actor	
2000	El teléfono	Himself – Host	
2007	La oveja negra	Omar Pereyra	Main cast
2010	Porque te quiero así	Nelson	Main cast
2012	Décadas	Himself – Host	
2017	Es tu sentido	Himself – Co-host	
2022–2024	La Voz Uruguay	Himself – Coach	
2023–2025	La Voz Kids Uruguay	Himself – Coach	

== See also ==
- Uruguayan rock
- Candombe
- Tótem (band)
