= Valeria Lynch =

Argentine singer and actress (born 1952)

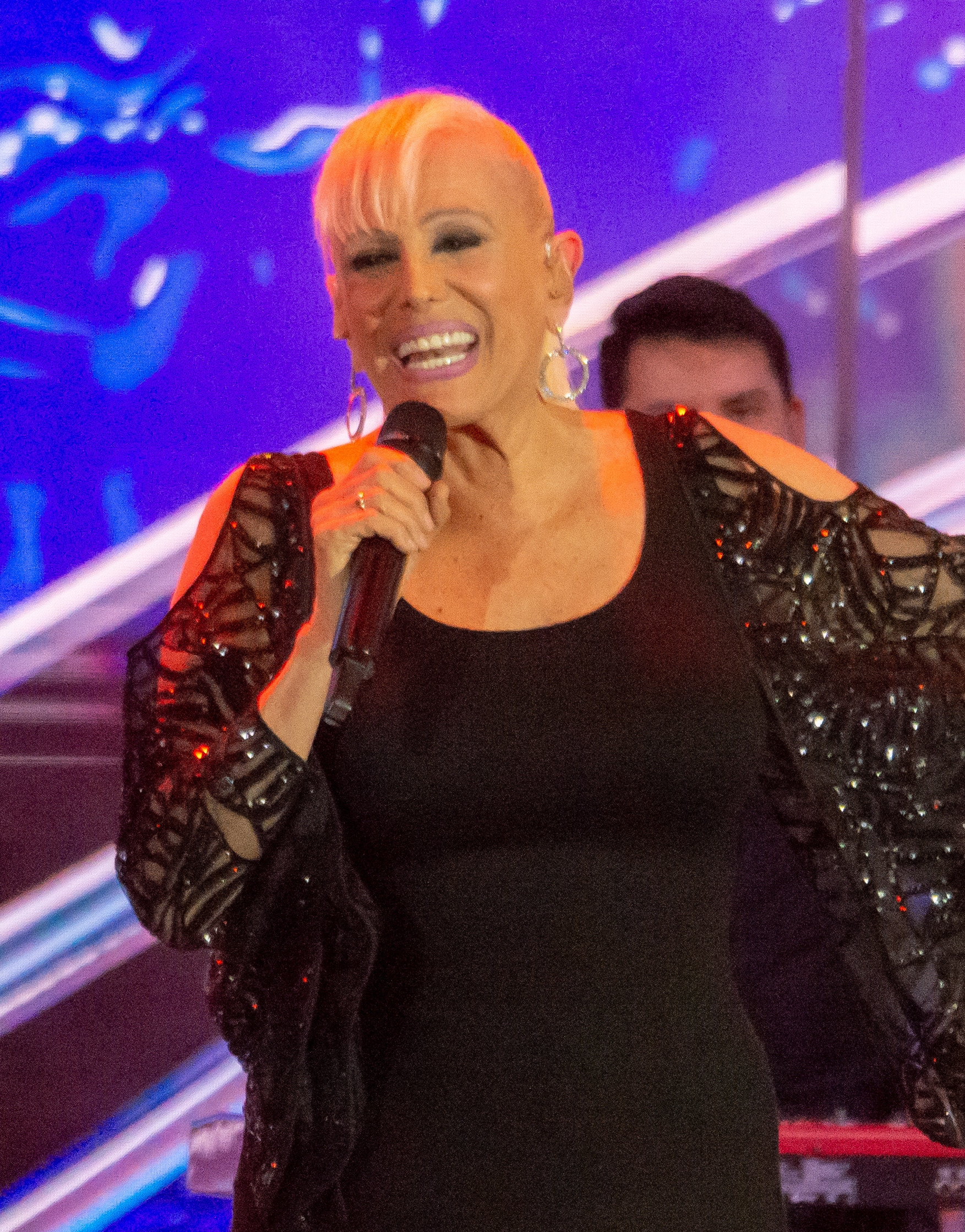
- Lynch in 2023

Background information
- Also known as: Valeria Lynch
- Born: María Cristina Lancelotti; January 7, 1952 (age 74); Buenos Aires, Argentina
- Genres: Pop, Balada
- Occupations: Artist, musician, actress
- Instruments: Vocals, Voice Mezzosoprano
- Years active: 1969–present
- Labels: Polydor, BMG, Leader Music, Sony Music

María Cristina Lancelotti (January 7, 1952 in Buenos Aires), better known by her stage name Valeria Lynch, is an Argentine singer and actress.

== Biography ==
Lynch was born on January 7, 1952, in the neighborhood of Villa Urquiza, Buenos Aires, Argentina, the first child of the marriage of María Antonia Spano (Tony) and José Julio Lancellotti. At age 14, while studying at the Commercial College Donato Álvarez in La Paternal, she defined her vocation and began to study singing with Clara Calvo and drama with Dante Gilardoni.

In 1969, Lynch debuted on the television show La Botica del Ángel with Eduardo Bergara Leumann, singing "Cuando un amigo se va". The first major production Lynch took, was with producer Alejandro Romay in the adaptation of the musical Hair, held at the Teatro Argentino in 1971 where she put her voice to the song Aquarius-Let The Sunshine In. From this Romay allegedly discovered her talent and suggested that she use a pseudonym.

Lynch began performing in the 1970s, singing jingles and underground rock in English with a group called Expression. She was also part of the TV TRIBU SRL, with which she recorded two songs for the soundtrack of the program, "I Am A Woman" and "Do Not Be Discouraged" as well as two different versions of the song" Tribu SRL "with the rest of the group, in 1975.

In 1976, Lynch married Héctor Cavallero, who had discovered her around 1974 when she was singing in the underground clubs of Buenos Aires. The story goes that Cavallero saw her sing and waited in the dressing room and offered to represent her and launch her career as a romantic singer. The couple had two sons, Federico (born 1979) and Santiago Cavallero (born 1986). After eighteen years together, they separated in 1995.

=== Debut and first steps in the music industry ===
In 1977, Lynch released her first album, Valeria Lynch, and the cover was a drawing of her profile made by her friend Horacio Fontova. Her version of the song Mujer Sola, written by the Italian Mia Martini (Domenica Berté), was the first cut of circulation. Her debut as a pop balladeer was at the nightclub Michelangelo in the barrio of San Telmo.

In April 1979, Lynch released the album Mujer and made her first promotional trip to Mexico and Central America.

=== 1980s ===
During the 1980s, Lynch's success spread throughout Latin America. Her visceral singing style, coupled with her strong vocals and the choice of a repertoire that reached for popular taste made the difference with other interpreters of pop ballads. Her songs were not only a success in U.S. and Latin America but their music came to Spain, the Netherlands, Japan, Romania, Italy and the former Soviet Union.

In 1980, while performing the musical "Estan tocando nuestra cancion" with Victor Laplace and Cipe Lincovsky in Buenos Aires, Lynch released her third studio album Capricornio. The song Somos Locos del Amor was a favorite of the Argentine public.

In 1981, Lynch was in Mexico on a promotional tour and people from her record company suggested she audition for the rock opera Evita, directed by Harold Prince. Mexican producers had chosen the Mexican Rocío Banquels, but Harold Prince was overwhelming in his statement that "in my music I want Valeria," so it was decided that the two were the protagonists. Playing the role of Eva Perón opened the doors to the international level. In repeated statements to the press Harold Prince said: "Valeria Lynch was the best that I got to direct as Evita".

In 1982, Lynch released Quiereme, the hit single Mentira, song composed by Chilean Buddy Richard and international success of the Nicaraguan Hernaldo Zúñiga, catapulted her to stardom and the album was promoted throughout the continent. This production won a Grammy Award nomination in the category "Best Latin Album" thanks to the orchestrations included, marking the first time the award was extended to Spanish-language recordings. On this album, the song "Esto llamado amor" involved renowned American singer Jeffrey Osborne, former lead singer of music group "LTD".

In 1983, the album Un poco mas de mi, also known as Contigo soy capaz de todo in some countries, was released. The song Amiga Mia, which had been recorded a year before by the Venezuelan singer Miriam Ochoa without commercial success, became a big hit as Valeria's rendition.

In 1984, Lynch signed with RCA Ariola, and started her most successful career point, selling millions of her various recordings.

In 1985, Lynch released Para Cantarle a la vida (To sing to life), with the singles Señor amante, Querido Mio, Que mal elegiste, tu eres el hombre Yo sin el and como una loba making this album one of the best sellers in the entire region. Such was the success that in Buenos Aires, she drew nearly 100,000 spectators in 53 shows with their concert at the Teatro Astros. Also in 1985 she was invited to participate in the International Festival of Popular Song at Yamaha Budokan hall in Tokyo, Japan. Singing before more than 15,000 people she won the award for Best Performer of the Festival and the Grand Jury Prize, with the song Rompecabezas (Puzzle) that allowed her to overtake the competition La Toya Jackson. Japanese jury chairman Genichi Kawakami said that he chose Lynch for her technique of interpretation, her movement on stage and her mastery of the microphone and said the jury's verdict coincided with the vote of the audience, Valeria getting 91% of votes. That year she was also invited to perform at the Festival de Benidorm, made in Spain.

In 1986, Lynch published Sin Fronteras with the singles Amame en Cámara Lenta, Fuera de mi Vida and Muñeca Rota, which went multi-platinum in different countries; the song Y tu no estas was covered by the legendary Cuban singer La Lupe, giving the lyrics of the song a religious twist and was adopted by the Protestant communities of Latin America, being popular to date. That year her song Cada dia mas, was part of the official soundtrack of the film Heroes, the film dedicated to the World Cup 1986, held in Mexico and won Argentina. She was also invited by Barry Manilow to record a duet Even Now that went by the name Hasta Hoy for Manilow's album Grandes Exitos en Español. Towards the end of the year she recorded with Mexican singer Marco Antonio Muñiz, Para no estar triste esta navidad which became number 1 in Mexico; and released Valeria Canta el Tango, becoming the biggest selling album of tango in Argentinian phonographic history, according to CAPIF, until 2009 (the record now held by Julio Iglesias with his album Tango).

In 1988, the album A cualquier Precio with a distinctly pop sound and innovative musical sold very successfully. That same year she performed in Carnegie Hall, New York and sold out for two nights. The New York Times chose her as "One of the five best voices in the world". The song "Piensa en Mi" remained for more than three months at the top the album sales charts for much of South America. The tour A cualquier precio ran in the main cities of the continent and made television specials for Puerto Rico, United States, Argentina and Mexico. She participated as the sole guest on the Mexican TV Mala Noche No conducted by Verónica Castro reaching peak audience in prime time, and received the "Latin Music Award (Latin Grammy) in the Voice of Voices and performed her show at the Desert Inn Hotel in the city of Las Vegas, U.S..

In 1989, Lynch composed and recorded la extraña dama for the TV series of the same name on Channel 9 from Argentina. The song, included on the LP Energia, sold 60,000 copies and features present in 9 shows at the Teatro Gran Rex de Buenos Aires. The album included the song Hay un mañana a duet with Mexican singer José José, "el principe de la cancion." She extensively toured throughout America, was named the "Figure of the Year" by the Association of Entertainment Critics of New York and also presented for the third time in Carnegie Hall, accompanying the singer Marcelo Alejandro as part of a music festival. The high ratings that popularised the soap opera "The Strange Lady" in the almost one hundred countries where televised brought the theme song sung by Valeria Lynch to markets like Italy, Israel, Egypt, Romania, Russia, Poland, Hungary, Australia, Greece, the Philippines and Turkey, where their records had not yet been published.

Between 1983 and 1989, Lynch was the Argentinean artist who placed the most songs in the main music sales and charts of Latin America.

=== 1990s ===
During the 1990s, Lynch's career was more quiet, as she was established in popular taste and adapted to the changing music industry and the market that saw the birth of vinyl gave way to CD and video as primary distribution mode. She remained successful due to her avant-garde sound in the last decade, without continental touring as before. Lynch also returned to musical comedy and was successful with the intelligentsia in Argentina that once did not understand so much success in a clearly popular figure.

In 1990 Lynch participated in the Festival of San Remo, Italy, where the critics compared her playing style to that of Mina Mazzini. Her record label BMG RCA- released a compilation album entitled "Mis mejores canciones" as a closure of her stage career full of hit songs. This sold just over 200,000 copies in Argentina alone.

Recorded in Rome in 1991, the album hablame de amor had sixteen consecutive performances at the Opera Theater in Buenos Aires, surpassing the record held by the Spanish Julio Iglesias at the same venue. Towards the end of that year, Lynch attracted more than 100,000 spectators at the concert at the Avenida 9 de Julio, Buenos Aires, and saw another 150,000 people in her recital at the Apple Festival in the province of Mendoza. She also made a special album for Chilean television.

In 1992, Lynch made a new version of " Estan Tocando nuestra Cancion" with her partner and friend Victor Laplace and her CD sin red launched.

In wintee 1993, Lynch performed at the Teatro Opera de Buenos Aires three performances, with the participation of Jorge Guinzburg, Antonio Gasalla, Mercedes Sosa, Horacio Fontova, Fabiana Bravo and Sandro. This recital was broadcast on Channel 13 of Buenos Aires.

In 1994, Lynch released Caravana de Sueños, produced by Michael Sembello. It was a break from the traditional sound of Valeria. Although she had global publishing, production fell short of expected sales. The CD included 4 tracks, with Sembello that had released on her album Caravan of Dreams in 1992. That year, also debuted was the TV program Valeria Dreaming on Channel 13, Argentina; a music program that was attended by Raphael, Simone, Marianne Faithfull, Dionne Warwick, Tony Bennett, Eros Ramazzotti, Roberto Carlos, Ana Belén, Víctor Manuel, Bottom Tap, Lucecita Benitez and Jose Feliciano, among others, with whom she shared interviews and songs as a duo. In November of that year, she was recognized in Peru with the award "Paloma de la Paz."

In 1995 came the turn of playing Aurora, the central character in "El beso de la mujer araña", again under the direction of Harold Prince, who was a deciding factor when Argentine producers called him to lead the implementation of the Kiss ... in Buenos Aires, and he inquired about who would be the protagonist, Prince said: "I love Valeria Lynch."

In 1996, Lynch released her latest studio work for the label BMG. "De regreso al amor" was an album of classic pop ballads and rhythm and blues arrangements.

In 1997, Lynch was invited by the Spanish singer Enrique Iglesias in his concert at the River Plate Stadium, Buenos Aires, singing duo the theme "Experiencia religiosa" In that year, she made for HBO special recorded music in the Opera theatre of Buenos Aires, called The Romantics, The Last Appointment with Armando Manzanero, Soledad Bravo and Nana Caymi.

In 1998, Lynch recorded the theme "Paths of the Soul" next to Kennedy Choirs and with more than 120 Argentine artists under the direction of Instrumental pianist and conductor Nazareno Andorno. That same year, in an end to the 14-year contract with BMG Ariola, her record label, they released a compilation album with dance arrangements in some songs. "Baila Conmigo" was certified gold album and the single was heard in all the clubs in Argentina. During the months of June and September led by American television program "Mas te Vale" that included the participation of guest musicians including recalls María Martha Serra Lima, Jairo, Victor Heredia, Carmen Flores and Claudia Puyo, among others.

In January 1999, Lynch debuted as an actress in the telenovela "Salvajes" TV channel Azul Argentina, the strip was part of the tropical music genre, from here would follow the single "Llamas en el corazon"performed by Valeria and after Isabel Pantoja the Spanish version recorded in Flemish. While at night, she starred with Patricia Sosa the musical "Las Hermanas de Carusso"in the Liceo Theatre, also dabbling in classical music, but the public response was not expected, and the season aired only a few weeks.

=== 2000s ===
In 2000, no longer contracted with multinational record labels, Lynch released her first independent production of the hand of Editorial Atlantida de Buenos Aires, the album algo natural achieved platinum status for 60000 copies sold. The particularity of this cd is that it was sold in newsstands and magazine, it was distributed abroad by regional labels. The song "Quisiera ser tu luz", Spanish version of the song "Living From Day To Day / Ani Chaya Li Mi'Yom Le'Yom" the Israeli singer Rita Kleinstein, became a radio hit, and the version of Valeria Years later, he began to sound on the radio from Jerusalem by the spread achieved by YouTube. In July of that same year she starred in a children's show season of "Lucia, la maga"at the Teatro Nacional.

During summer 2002, Lynch was invited to the prestigious Festival de Viña del Mar in Chile, establishing herself as a composer to win with her song "Soy tu angel"as performed by Oscar Patiño in international competition. That same year she presented with overwhelming success in 3 functions completely sold-out in the Opera Theatre of Buenos Aires.

In 2003, Lynch performed with actresses Alicia Mazzer and Emilia Bruzzo in the play "Monologos de la vagina" (Vagina Monologues).

In 2004, Lynch released Vivo por Valeria, recorded live at the Opera Theater of Buenos Aires. The tour to promote this album convened more than 250,000 people in its various actions by Argentina, Chile and Uruguay. Also, this year called Nito Artaza to star with important figures in the show "Argentina todo un Show" with great success in their seasons of Mar del Plata and Buenos Aires.

In 2005, Lynch released Nosotras, produced by Roberto Livi.

In 2006, Lynch played in the theater "El Nacional" Corrientes Avenue in the City of Buenos Aires the musical Victor Victoria and participated in the jury of the television reality show Singing for a Dream. She also began developing her teaching career, with a string of musical schools located in several cities in Argentina.

During the first half of 2007, Lynch performed musicals by Victor Victoria in his season at the Teatro Teleton de Santiago de Chile. In November 2007 she presented a new show in the Gran Rex theatre in Buenos Aires.

In March 2008, Lynch presented the show Bien Argentino, drawing over 60,000 spectators, where she shared the stage with Raul Lavie and Laura Fidalgo.

In April 2009, Lynch debuted again with Nito Artaza and together with Chico Novarro from the review show Arráncame la risa. In November of that same year she presented her show Cada 'dia more Valeria', summoning more than 15,000 people at the Gran Rex theater in Buenos Aires, with the presence of Estela Raval, Pimpinela and Palito Ortega.

During summer 2010, Lynch was the main attraction of the magazine "Carnaval de Estrellas" in the town of Carlos Paz, in the province of Cordoba, Argentina, and leading the box office with 60,000 viewers. Her interpretation of the song "Grande Amore", which was a hit in the voice of Mina Mazzini, was one of the most celebrated musical boxes.

In November 2010, Lynch entered the commercial market, after 5 years of silence, with the album Todo o Nada. Produced by Horacio Lanzi and with a return to the style that led her to fame. The day of its release the CD was awarded the gold certification and sold-out in performance at the Gran Rex theatre in Buenos Aires for 5 functions.

During summer 2010, Lynch was the main attraction of the magazine Star Carnival in the city of Carlos Paz, in the province of Córdoba, Argentina, and led the box office with 60,000 spectators. Her rendition of the song Grande Amore which was a success in the voice of Italian singer Mina, was one of the most celebrated musical shows.

In 2011, Lynch toured shows in Argentina, Paraguay and Uruguay. In August, she launched her fragrance Loba, a name inspired by the song "Como una Loba" (1985). In November of the same year she began a tour of presentations by US, Argentina and Uruguay with her new tour "Loba".

During 2012, Lynch participated as a juror of TV shows "Cantando por un Sueño" and "Soñando por Cantar," broadcast on Channel 13. Later in the year, she presented her new show "Valeria Vale" at Teatro Gran Rex, managing to gather more than 15,000 people in 5 functions.

In early 2013, Lynch presented at the Teatro Colón in Buenos Aires as part of the show "Las Elegidas" where accompanied by a symphony orchestra she performed her classic "Piensa en mi By the end of 2013 Valeria is resubmitted at the Teatro Gran Rex in Buenos Aires, with its new show titled "La Elegida" on 9/10/23 and November 24.

During the early months of 2014, Lynch toured Argentina, Paraguay and Uruguay taking the month of February in Miami to record the album "Valeria Con Todo" with production of Rafael Vergara and Vicky Echeverry, published by Sony Music Argentina in Latin America, marking her return to a multinational company. The point of note was the song "Un Nuevo Día" which was presented as a leitmotiv to support Argentina in the World Cup Brazil 2014. This new album included the first theme, "Soy tu angel" establishing her songwriting and won the "Gaviota de Plata", and the Viña del Mar International Song Festival in 2002.

In November and December, Lynch presented her show Valeria Con Todo at the Grand Rex theater in Buenos Aires for four nights and received in the US the Latin Grammy award for Musical Excellence for her contribution to popular music from Latin America, recognizing after 32 years from obtaining the record "Quiereme" a Grammy nomination for orchestrating the song "Cambias mi amor".

== Discography ==
Valeria Lynch has sold over 15 million copies.

=== 2000s ===
- RompeCabezas (2019). Sony Music Argentina.
- Extraña Dama Del Rock (2017). Sony Music Argentina.
- Sinfónica (2015). DVD + CD. Sony Music Argentina.
- Valeria Con Todo (2014). Sony Music Argentina.
- Valeria Vale (2014). DVD + CD. Leader Music.
- Loba (2012) DVD + CD. Leader Music.
- La Máxima (2011) DVD + CD doble. Leader Music.
- 2010 O Todo O Nada- (Everything Or Nothing)
- 2007 Víctor Victoria- Victor Victoria, Theatre Show
- 2006 Víctor Victoria- Victor Victoria, Theatre Show
- 2006 Nosotras- (Us,)
- 2004 Vivo por Valeria- (I live for Valeria live recorded album)
- 2000 Algo Natural- (Something Natural)
- 2000 Lucía, la Maga- (Lucia, the Magician)

=== 1990s ===
- 1999 Las Hijas de Caruso- (1999, Caruso's Daughters)
- 1996 De Regreso al Amor- (1996, Returning to Love)
- 1995 El Beso de la Mujer Araña- 1995, Kiss of the Spider Woman
- 1994 Caravana de Sueños- (1994, Dreams March) produced by Michael Sembello.
- 1993 Todo Valeria Lynch de FM: Tango Para Usted- (1993, tango album, Everything Valeria FM: Tango for You)
- 1992 Sin Red- (1992, Without a net)
- 1992 Están Tocando Nuestra Canción- (re-issue of 1980 album)
- 1991 Háblame de Amor- (Tell me About Love)
- 1990 Sanremo '90- (1990, recorded live in Sanremo, Italy)

=== 1980s ===
- 1989 Energía- (Energy)
- 1988 A Cualquier Precio- (At any Price)
- 1986 Sin Fronteras- (Without Frontiers)
- 1996 Valeria Canta el Tango- (Tango album)
- 1986 En Vivo: reedición- (remake of her 1984 album, En Vivo)
- 1985 Ciclos 85, reedición de Capricornio- (a remake of Capricornio)
- 1985 World Popular Song Festival Tokyo- (1985, recorded live during her award-winning performance)
- 1984 Cada Día Más- (More Each Day)
- 1984 En Vivo- (live recorded album)
- 1983 Mujer: redición- (1983, Woman: re-edited)
- 1983 Un Poco Más de Mí- (A Little bit More of Me)
- 1982 Quiéreme- (Love Me)
- 1982 Valeria Lynch Canta Evita- (another album dedicated to Evita Peron)
- 1981 Evita (México)- (album dedicated to Evita Peron and to Mexico)
- 1980 Están Tocando Nuestra Canción- (They are Playing our Song)
- 1980 Capricornio- (Capricorn)

=== 1970s ===
- 1979 Yo Soy tu Canción- (I am Your Song)
- 1977 Valeria Lynch- (self titled debut album)

== Filmography ==
=== Movies ===
- Lynch participated alongside Raul Julia in the Hollywood motion picture, Tango Bar filmed in Puerto Rico.
- Her song Me Das Cada Día Más was used for Hero, the 1986 official FIFA World cup film.

=== Television ===
- La Voz Uruguay (coach)
- Cantando Por Un Sueño (2006/2011, Singing for a dream)
- Movete (2002, Move on)
- Salvajes (1999, Savages)
- Más te Vale (1998, You'd Better!)
- Vale Valeria (1997, Valeria's Worth It)
- Soñando con Valeria (1994, Dreaming with Valeria)
- Tribu (1975, Tribe, variety show)

Lynch has participated in other television shows as a special guest.

=== Commercials ===
- Tarjeta Galicia (2009)
- Querubin (2004, Querubin Products)
- Coca-Cola (2001)
- Vinos Termidor (1978, for Termidor Wines)

== See also ==
- List of best-selling Latin music artists
