= Television in Uruguay =

Analog television in Uruguay had a history of more than 50 years since it began in 1956, with the first television channel, Channel 10. Since then Uruguay has three other channels, Channel 12 Teledoce, Channel 4 Monte Carlo TV and Television Nacional Uruguay

== Cable television ==
Cable television is largely controlled by the Equital conglomerate, founded in 1991, which is owned in equal parts by the three private television stations of Montevideo: Montecable (channel 4), TCC (channel 10), and Nuevo Siglo (channel 12). Each network owns a cable company: Monte Carlo owns Montecable, SAETA owns TCC, and Teledoce owns Nuevo Siglo. The tripartite conglomerate monopolizes pay television in Montevideo and parts of the inland, controlling at least one of the two providers available in Colonia del Sacramento, Salto, Paysandú, Treinta y Tres, Melo, Durazno, Minas, Rocha and Tacuarembó. Equital has been accused of cartelization and has been investigated by URSEC in the first half of the 2000s for collusion and price control. In 2024 the three companies were authorized to operate as a consortium

== Digital television ==
On August 27, 2007, the Uruguayan government issued a decree stating that the DVB-T and DVB-H standards would be adopted. Uruguay hoped at the time for neighboring countries to reach an agreement on an HDTV standard, a process which took a number of years. On February 17, 2011, the government issued a new decree revoking the former one, and selecting ISDB-T as the standard to be adopted.

- Brazil adopted the ISDB-T system in November 2007 after a very extensive and consistent study (executed by Mackenzie University and Television Engineering Association) where ISDB-T standard presented a more robust signal, more flexible services including mobile TV reception for free and excellent user interactive services. The implementation rollout through the country has been very successful. The prices of digital TV receivers and set-top boxes are rapidly decreasing.
- In the late 2000s, Argentina was analyzing ISDB-T to verify if the standard also attends their needs. There is a wish to implement only one digital TV standard in all Mercosur Area, and if Argentina chooses ISDB-T it will be an important step for that integration (except for Uruguay and Colombia).
- Uruguayan URSEC authorities provided no information on which road they would go until late in 2007. On August 27, 2007, Ursec settled on DVB-T and DVB-H. The TV sets being sold in Uruguay seem to be closer to ATSC HDTV-based standards (60 Hz systems, with ATSC tuners in some cases). Most of the DVD-based content in the country is NTSC/60 Hz-based, while the TV standard in use is PAL/50 Hz-based. Most of the analog TV sets sold are PAL-N, PAL-M and NTSC-capable, while most DVD players are multiregion. Authorities are not asking retailers to identify which standard the HDTV sets sold adhere to.
- 2010: All subscription television operators offer HDTV premium packages at varying prices. The offers rely on proprietary set-top boxes.

== Channels ==
=== National ===
Logo	Name	Content	Launch	Owner	Operator	Coverage	Website
	Canal 10 (Primary)	Generalist	December 7, 1956; 69 years ago	(Uruguay) Grupo Fontaina - De Feo (Private)	(Uruguay) Sociedad Anónima de Emisoras de Televisión y Anexos	(Uruguay) National	Canal 10
	Canal 4 (Primary)	Generalist	April 23, 1961; 65 years ago	(Uruguay) Grupo Monte Carlo (Private)	(Uruguay) Monte Carlo TV S.A.	(Uruguay) National	Canal 4
	Teledoce (Primary)	Generalist	April 2, 1962; 64 years ago (Note: At the time, it launched as Tele12. In 1980 it was renamed Teledoce Televisora Color and in 2000, it adopted its current name, Teledoce.)	(Uruguay) Grupo Disco (Private)	(Uruguay) Sociedad Televisora Larrañaga	(Uruguay) National	Teledoce
	Canal 5 (Primary)	Generalist	June 19, 1963; 63 years ago (Note: Formerly known as Canal 5 SODRE.)	(Uruguay) Servicio de Comunicación Audiovisual Nacional (Public)	Televisión Nacional Uruguay	(Uruguay) National	Canal 5
	La Red (Secondary)	Generalist	August 25, 1981; 45 years ago	(Uruguay) Grupo Monte Carlo; Grupo Disco; Grupo Juanicó (Private)	(Uruguay) Red Uruguaya de Televisión S.A.	(Uruguay) National	
	TV Ciudad (Primary)	Generalist	September 1, 1996; 30 years ago	(Uruguay) Intendencia de Montevideo	(Uruguay) Servicio de Información y Comunicación del Gobierno de Montevideo	(Uruguay) National	TV Ciudad

=== Regional ===
Each of the departments of Uruguay contain at least one television station broadcasting from within its territory. Each station airs its own productions and content, with some exceptions such as Canal 8 from Cerro Largo Department, operated by Televisión Nacional del Uruguay and the public channel of Montevideo, TV Ciudad also considering itself as the only network with international coverage, which is also available in Chile and Argentina (as a cable channel).

- Artigas

Channel	Type
Canal 3 Artigas Televisión	Private
TV5 Artigas	Private
Canal 8 Bella Unión TV	Private
Canal 10 Bella Unión	Private

- Canelones

Channel	Type
Canal 6 Ciudad de la Costa	Private
Canal 6 TVL Pando	Private
Canal 8 Canelones Capital	Private
Canal 11 Las Piedras	Private
Canal 11 Santa Lucía	Private
ANPI TV San Ramón	Private
TalaVisión	Private

- Cerro Largo

Channel	Type
Canal 8, Televisión Nacional	Public
Canal 12 Melo	Private
Canal 38 Río Branco TV	Private

- Colonia

Canal	Titularidad
Canal 3	Private
Canal 4 Juan Lacaze	Private
Canal 5 Tarariras	Private
Canal 5 Noticias y Deportes	Private
ABCTV Colonia	Private

- Durazno

Channel	Type
Canal 6 Zebra Televisión	Private
Canal 7	Private
Canal 8	Private

- Flores

Channel	Type
Canal 8 Trinidad	Private

- Florida

Channel	Type
Canal 4 Televisión Florida	Private
Canal 23 TVD	Private
Florida Televisora Color	Private
Tevé Más Florida	Private

- Lavalleja

Channel	Type
Canal 2 Minas	Private
Vivo Canal 3	Private
Canal 13 Cerro del Verdún	Private

- Maldonado

Channel	Type
Canal 2 San Carlos	Private
Canal 7 Punta del Este	Private
Canal Once	Private
Canal 8 Cable Carolino	Private
Canal 30 PuntaCable	Private

- Montevideo

Channel	Type
TV Ciudad	Public
VTV	Private
A+V	Private
CRTV	Private
UCLTV	Private
Cardinal TV	Private
Canal 26 (off air)	Private

- Paysandú

Canal	Titularidad
TV Río Canal 3	Private
Latina TV	Private
Efusiva TV	Private
Canal 4	Private

- Río Negro

Channel	Type
Canal 11 Fray Bentos	Private
Río Uruguay Televisión	Private
Canal 14 Young	Private

- Rivera

Channel	Type
Canal 3 Minas de Corrales	Private
Canal 8 Rivera	Private
TeveDiez Rivera	Private

- Rocha

Canal	Titularidad
Canal 2 Lascano	Private
Canal 4 Chuy Color	Private
Canal 8	Private
El Nueve de Rocha	Private

- Salto

Channel	Type
Canal 4	Private
UNO TV Canal 5	Private
Canal 8	Private

- San José

Channel	Type
CLD TV	Private
Canal 9 CCV	Private

- Soriano

Channel	Type
Canal 4 Dolores	Private
Tele 8 Mercedes	Private
CV10 Canal 10	Private
TVEO Dolores	Private

- Tacuarembó

Channel	Type
Canal 4	Private
Canal 7 Zorrilla de San Martín	Private
Canal 9 Paso de los Toros	Private

- Treinta y Tres

Canal	Titularidad
Canal 4 Plaza Canal	Private
Canal 11	Private
33TV	Private

== Most viewed channels ==
Position	Channel	Share of total viewing (%)
1	Teledoce	12.3
2	Channel 10	9.8
3	Channel 4	8.9
4	Canal 5	3.6
5	TV Ciudad	3.3
6	La Red	2.5
7	VTV	2.0
8	UCL TV	1.2
9	VTV Plus	1.0
10	Canal A+V	0.6
