= Óscar Bottinelli =

Uruguayan political scientist

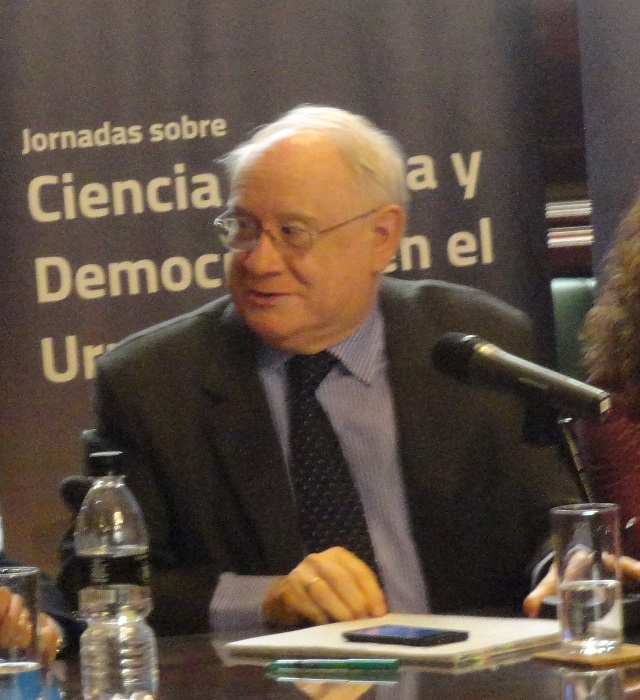
Óscar Bottinelli on the panel "Democracy and party system" at the seminar "30 years after the restoration: the challenges of Uruguayan democracy", held at the Legislative Palace of Uruguay.

Óscar Alberto Bottinelli Capuccio (born 7 November 1944) is a Uruguayan politician, teacher and surveyor.

== Biography ==
Born in Dolores in Soriano Department, Bottinelli was a parliamentary correspondent for the newspaper El País. He then entered politics, serving as political secretary to Broad Front leader Líber Seregni between 1971 and 1987. He lived in Argentina between 1974 and 1982, exiled from the dictatorship.

He has gained particular prominence during election times. He broadcast numerous surveys on Channel 4 Monte Carlo TV and Radio Monte Carlo from 1989 to 2016, particularly in election years. He is also a columnist on El Observador and El Espectador radio.

He teaches at the Faculty of Social Sciences of the University of the Republic, where he is a full professor (grade 5) of electoral systems. In April 2017, Bottinelli received the decoration of Commander of the Order of the Star of Italy. He has Italian citizenship.
