= Gran Hermano (Uruguayan TV series) season 1 =

Season of television series

Gran Hermano
- Season 1
- Presented by: Eduardo Gianarelli
- No. of days: 90
- No. of housemates: 21

Release
- Original network: Canal 10
- Original release: 20 September 2026

The first season of the Uruguayan reality television series, Gran Hermano, premiered on Canal 10 on 20 September 2026 and will last for 90 days.

== Format ==
The season follows a group of contestants who are isolated in a house and remain cut off from the outside world for approximately three months. Throughout their stay, the contestants are monitored by "Gran Hermano" and nominate one another on a weekly basis, after which the public decides by vote who will leave the house. The last contestant remaining in the house is declared the winner of the season and receives the final prize.

== Broadcast ==
The show airs on Canal 10 from Sundays to Thursdays in prime time. Its premiere averaged a 25.7 rating, peaking at 29.3 points. The live shows are hosted by Eduardo Gianarelli, alongside a panel that discusses events taking place in the house. The panel consists of Natalie Yoffe, Sofía Tardáguila, Oscar Belo, Esteban Leonís, Ciara Nin, Lucas Fuente and Luis Lacalle Ponce de León. The panel also features rotating guest panelists, including Uruguayan Gran Hermano Argentina contestants Santiago Algorta, winner of the twelfth season, and Yisela Paola, runner-up of the thirteenth season, as well as Gastón Trezeguet, runner-up of the first season.

A special program, Gran Hermano: El Debate, airs on Fridays, hosted by Eliana Dide and featuring a panel that reviews the events of the week, while Espiando la Casa, hosted by Agustín Gil, airs on weekday afternoons and Saturday nights, providing live coverage of events taking place inside the house. The 24-hour live feed of the house is available on Antel TV, Antel's video streaming service, and DirecTV's DGO. Canal 10 also simulcasts the live shows on YouTube, hosted by Magui Díaz and Agustín Gil.

== HouseGuests ==
Name	Age on entry	Hometown	Occupation	Day entered	Day exited	Result
Stephanie Dudok	29	Montevideo	Nurse	1		
Facundo Fernández	21	Trinidad	Musician	1		
Bruno Acevedo	28	Punta del Este	Artist	1		
Bruno Reyes	32	Maldonado	Lifeguard	1		
Esteban Álvarez	46	Montevideo	Bus driver	1		
Fabricio Bianchessi	31	Paysandú	Blacksmith	1		
Gustavo Fernández	37	Montevideo	Footballer	1		
Jessica Martínez	36	Salto	Lingerie designer	1		
Juan Martín Santana	26	Tambores	Law student	1		
Jazmín Esquivel	22	Ciudad de la Costa	Manicurist	1		
Melanie Porta	36	Montevideo	OSE employee	1		
Guillermo Suárez	25	Durazno	Farmhand	1		
Matías Calimares	20	Montevideo	Basketball player	1		
Agustina Zerbino	26	Montevideo	Influencer	1	51	Evicted
Laura Dotto	67	Montevideo	Ambulance driver	1	44	Evicted
Matías Catán	31	Montevideo	Tour operator	1	37	Evicted
Victoria Campo	30	Ciudad de la Costa	Unemployed	1	29	Evicted
Guadalupe Conti	26	Salto	College student	1	21	Evicted
Tatiana Milano	36	Barros Blancos	Entrepreneur	1	14	Evicted
Victoria Gallego	26	Montevideo	Unemployed	1	7	Evicted
Tatiana Cabrera	30	Canelones	Real estate agent	1	2	Evicted
