= Giannina Silva =

- Silva models in 2018
- Born: Giannina Carla Silva Varela; 24 November 1984 (age 41); Montevideo, Uruguay
- Occupations: Model; television host; beauty pageant titleholder; actress
- Beauty pageant titleholder
- Major competitions: Miss Uruguay 2007 (Winner); Reina Hispanoamericana 2007 (Top 8)

Giannina Carla Silva Varela (born 24 November 1984) is a Uruguayan actress, television host, model and beauty pageant titleholder who represented her country at Miss Universe 2007.

== Early life and education ==
Silva was born on November 24, 1984, in barrio Palermo, Montevideo. She comes from a family of carnival performers; Her uncle was Waldemar Silva, founder of the Cuareim 1080 comparsa. She completed her primary and secondary studies at the Elbio Fernández School and Lyceum, graduating as part of the institution's honor roll.

== Career ==
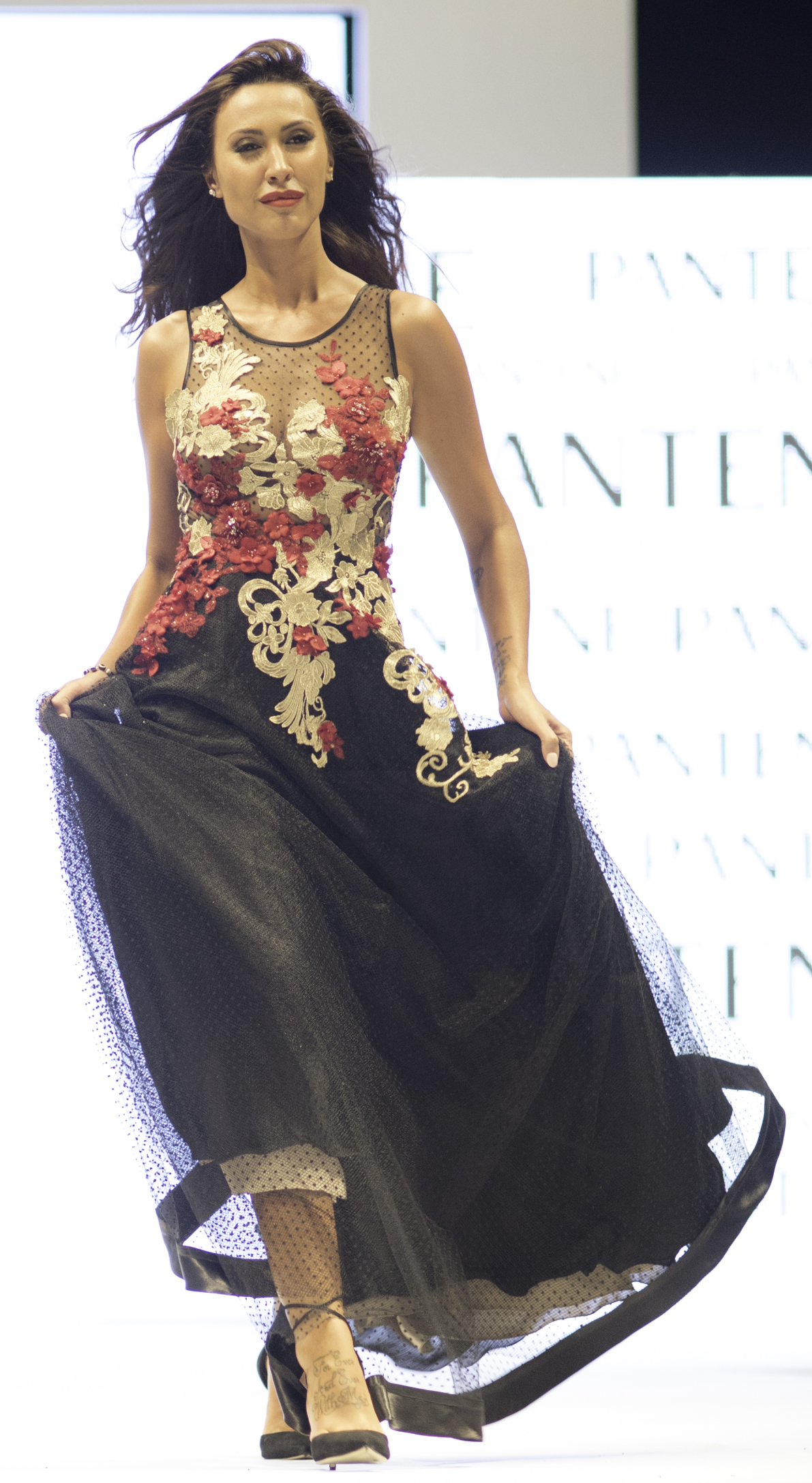
Silva walks a runway in 2018

=== Pageantry ===
In 2006 she was named Queen of Punta del Este.

In March 2007 Silva won the Miss Universe Uruguay pageant, defeating Claudia Vanrell, Agostina Padula, Sofya Guerrero and Laura Zamora. As Miss Uruguay, she later competed in Miss Universe 2007 held in Mexico City. In October she was crowned Miss América Latina but was later dethroned because she did not comply with the rules that the pageant required as a winner. That year she also participated in the Reina Hispanoamericana pageant, where she ended as one of the top eight placers.

In 2009 Silva competed in the Miss Hawaiian Tropic International Punta del Este 2009 held at the Conrad Hotel in Punta del Este.

=== Carnival ===
She began to participate in carnival festivals from an early age. In 2003, at the age of 18 she was named Carnival Queen. Since then, she has appeared in the annual Las Llamadas parade as one of the main vedettes of her family's comparsa, Cuareim 1080. She also participates in the Melo Carnival parade, which is attended by numerous celebrities from both the country and abroad.

=== Television ===
In 2008 she had her first appearance on television in an important role, as a behind-the-scenes host of the Channel 10 reality musical Localidades agotadas. From 2012 to 2016 she was of the cast of the humorous program on Channel 4, Sé lo que viste, of which she was also a co-host in its last seasons. For her participation, she was nominated for the television revelation at the 20th Iris Awards. In 2015, she served as a judge in the reality modeling youth Maybelline Model, in which she had participated as a guest the previous year.

In 2016, after two years as a reporter, she joined the panel of the television newsmagazine program, Algo contigo, which brought her national recognition and the Iris Award for best reporter in 2017. In 2020 she made her hosting debut, with the Sunday music program Aquí está su música. In December 2022, she replaced Andy Vila in hosting the daytime show Vamo Arriba, and on January 27, 2023, she left Algo contigo.

== Filmography ==
Year	Title	Role	Notes
2008	Localidades agotadas	Herself	Backstage host
2012–2016	Sé lo que viste	Herself	Co-host and sketch actress
2014–2016	Algo contigo	Herself	Reporter
2014	Maybelline Model	Herself	Guest judge; 1 episode
2015	Maybelline Model	Herself	Judge
2016–2023	Algo contigo	Herself	Panelist
2020–present	Aquí está su música	Herself	Host
2022–present	Vamo Arriba	Herself	Host
