= Natalie Yoffe =

Uruguayan model and television personality (born 1985)

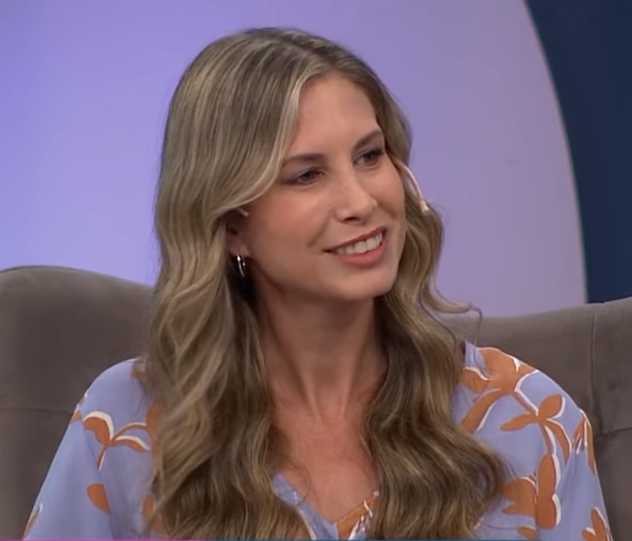
- Yoffe in 2024
- Born: Natalie Yoffe Parnes; July 18, 1985 (age 41); Montevideo, Uruguay
- Education: Catholic University of Uruguay
- Occupations: Model; actress; entrepreneur
- Spouse: Andrés Ojeda (m. 2017; div. 2023)

Natalie Yoffe Parnes (born July 18, 1985) is a Uruguayan fashion model, actress and television personality. She has developed her acting career mainly on the stage, with some appearances in television shows.

== Early life and career ==
Yoffe was born in Israel. She studied acting during her teenage years, and after graduating from high school she enrolled at the Catholic University of Uruguay, from which she graduated with a law degree.

She began working as a model at an early age, and in 2010 she was second runner-up in the Miss Uruguay pageant. Later that year, she represented her country at the Miss Bikini International pageant held in Sanya, China. In 2011 she began her career in the media, as a panelist on Channel 4's television newsmagazine show, Algo contigo. Her work earned her the award for best newcomer on television at the 18th Iris Awards.

After gaining notoriety in Algo contigo, she joined the news program Telenoche as presenter of the celebrity and entertainment news section. In 2013 she left Channel 4 and joined Teledoce. She replaced Patricia Wolf as co-host of her magazine program Verano Perfecto, remaining until it went off the air in 2015. In 2016 she co-hosted the Miss Uruguay pageant.

Since 2012 and since then she has performed in several plays almost every year, some of which have been awarded the Florencio Award, given for Uruguayan productions and performances. In 2022, after several years away from television, Yoffe was announced as celebrity participant for the third season of Channel 10's MasterChef Celebrity. She was the 16th person eliminated from the competition, and after entering a repechage again, she finished in 11th place overall. In 2023, she joined La previa, a debate program about Gran Hermano.

Yoffe runs the accessories and clothing brand Ring a Bell with her sister Maia. It has a store in the Montevideo neighborhood of Pocitos.

== Personal life ==
Yoffe dated actor Álvaro Armand Ugón from 2010 to 2011, and pilot Sebastián Echeverria from 2013 to 2015. Later that year she began dating lawyer and television personality Andrés Ojeda, having met through a mutual friend. They married on October 21, 2017, in a ceremony that attracted media attention. In late April 2023, the couple divorced. Ojeda was the Colorado Party's candidate for president in the 2024 general election, coming in third place with 16.85% of the vote.

== Filmography ==
Year	Title	Role	Notes
2011–2013	Algo contigo	Herself	Panelist
2012	Telenoche	Herself	Columnist
2013–2015	Verano Perfecto	Herself	Co-host
2022	MasterChef Celebrity	Herself	Contestant; 18th. Eliminated
2023–2026	La Previa de Gran Hermano	Herself	Panelist
2026–present	Gran Hermano	Herself	Panelist
