= Radio Oriental =

CX 12 Radio Oriental
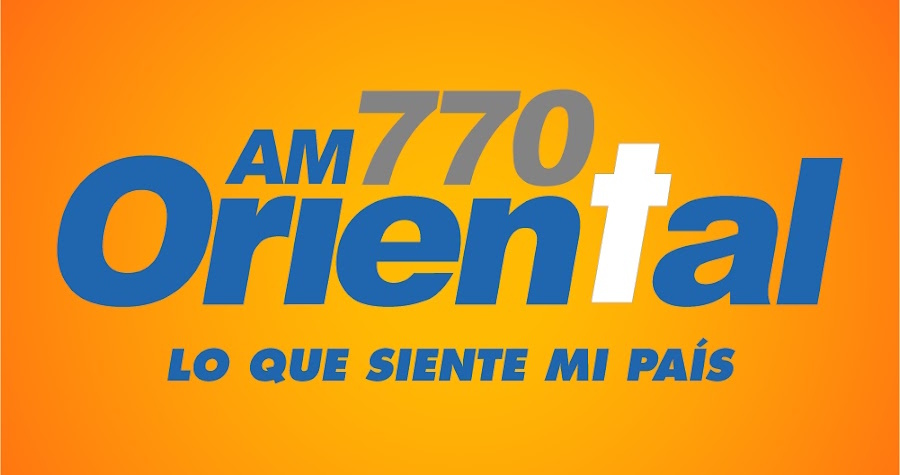
- Montevideo; Uruguay
- Broadcast area: Uruguay
- Frequency: 770 kHz

Programming
- Format: Talk/ Religious/ Sports

Ownership
- Owner: Arquidiócesis de Montevideo

History
- First air date: since 1928

Technical information
- Licensing authority: FCC
- Power: 100 KW

Links
- Public license information: 12 Radio Oriental Public file; LMS
- Website: 770 AM

CX 12 Radio Oriental is a Uruguayan Spanish-language AM radio station broadcasting from La Paz city in Canelones, its studios are located in Montevideo and its signal can be heard from the whole country and some cities from Argentina and Brazil.

== History ==
It used to belong to the same multimedia group as CX 20 Radio Monte Carlo, led by Elvira Salvo and her son Daniel; in 2003 it was sold to the Uruguayan Roman Catholic Church.

== Selected programs ==
- Musicalísimo (music/variety with Abel Duarte).
- En Perspectiva (Morning show with Emiliano Cotelo).
- Hora 25 de los deportes (Sports with Javier Máximo Goñi).
- Noticiero Oriental (News).
- Alas para el Folklore (regional music with Israel Ferraro)
