= Sebastián Beltrame (presenter) =

Uruguayan television producer and presenter

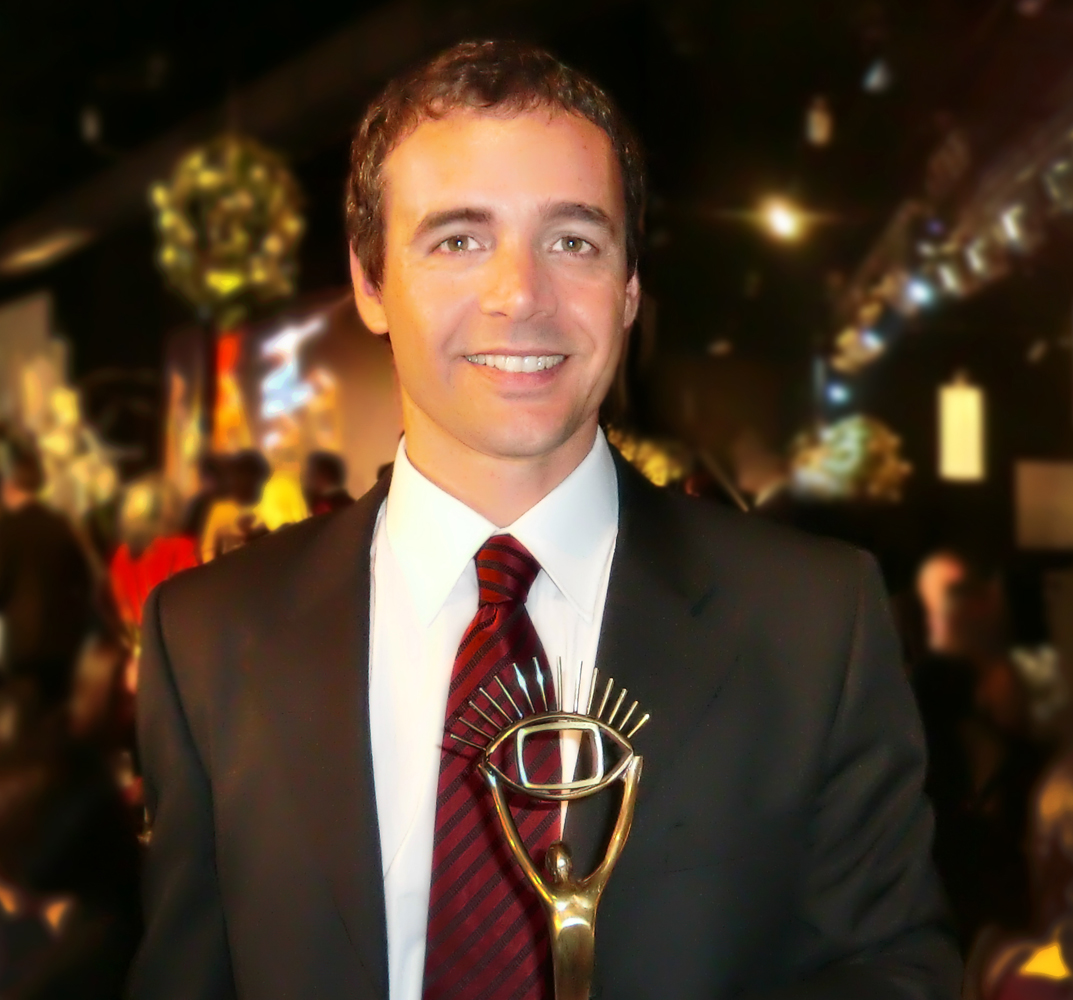
- Born: 13 October 1973 (age 52); Montevideo, Uruguay
- Occupations: Television producer; director; presenter
- Spouse: Leticia Morales (m. 2013)
- Children: Antonio and Alejandro

Sebastián Beltrame Bouzas (born 13 October 1973) is a Uruguayan television producer, director and presenter.

== Biography ==
Sebastián Beltrame Bouzas was born on October 13, 1973, to Jorge Beltrame and María Bouzas, a Spanish immigrant to Uruguay. When he was one year old, he moved with his family to San Juan, where his parents formed a community with professionals from different areas, who went to build homes. At the age of four, he moved to Tacuarembó, where he lived for three years, and then to Tarariras; later he lived in Colonia del Sacramento for two years. When he started high school, his parents divorced, and he moved with his father to Montevideo, while his mother to Buenos Aires.

In 2001, as an architecture student, he traveled around the world. Back in Uruguay, he produced the program Fuera de Foco for Teledoce, in which he travels around different parts of the world and shows the people their customs. Later, the program was added to the programming of Channel 4, and its name changed to En Foco.

In 2012 he published a tourist guide book called En Foco, la guía turística del Uruguay, while in 2013 and 2014 he published En Foco Magazine which focused on international travel. In 2020, during the COVID-19 pandemic, Beltrame became the first foreigner to visit the Gamaleya Research Institute of Epidemiology and Microbiology where the Sputnik V vaccine was being manufactured. The experience was recorded in the documentary series entitled En Foco: de viaje en pandemia. In March 2021 he was announced as part of the panel of the Channel 4's game show, Los 8 escalones. He was a member of the show's staff until it was taken off the air in August 2022.

== Career ==
In his career, Beltrame has made numerous documentary series for television:

- 2002, La vuelta al mundo.
- 2004, Fuera de Foco.
- 2005−present, En Foco.
- 2005, Embarcados, la aventura del Capitán Miranda.
- 2005, De sur a sur.
- 2006, Noches Blancas.
- 2007, The Tall Ships Races
- 2008, El milagro de los Andes.
- 2010, La Antártida: 40 bajo cero.
- 2010, Navegando por el mundo.
- 2011, La ruta de los conquistadores.
- 2012, Falklands.
- 2013, Congo.
- 2013, La ruta 66.

== Accolades ==
In 2012, En Foco was awarded the Iris Award for the best documentary and testimonial. The program was also awarded two Tabaré Awards and the UAM Award.

== Personal life ==
In June 2013, he married Leticia Morales privately in Las Vegas, after ten years of dating. However, on August 9 they held a party in Montevideo with his family and friends. Together they have two children. born in 2013 and 2016 respectively.
