= Channel 8 (Rosario, Uruguay) =

Canal 8 (CXB 44)
Rosario, Colonia Department; Uruguay
- Channels: Analog: 8 (VHF); Digital: 31 (UHF); Virtual: 8.1

Programming
- Affiliations: La Red

Ownership
- Owner: Grupo Juanicó; (Canal 8 Rosario S.A.)

History
- First air date: September 9, 1970
- Former call signs: CXB 26 (1966–2000s)

Technical information
- Licensing authority: URSEC

Canal 8 Rosario is a Uruguayan free-to-air television station, located in the city of Rosario, Colonia Department, founded in 1970. The station is part of Red Uruguaya de Televisión (La Red) and covers all of Colonia, as well as San José and Flores.

== History ==
The station launched on September 9, 1970, having a close relation to Monte Carlo Televisión since its beginning, controlling it for decades. As of 2017, it produced a daily five-minute bulletin that aired before the relay of Telenoche 4.

On October 1, 2017, the station fired its six staff and started relaying La Red.

On February 13, 2025, the Uruguayan presidency authorized the sale of Canal 8 from Grupo Romay to Grupo Juanicó, owners of La Red.
