= Ximena Torres =

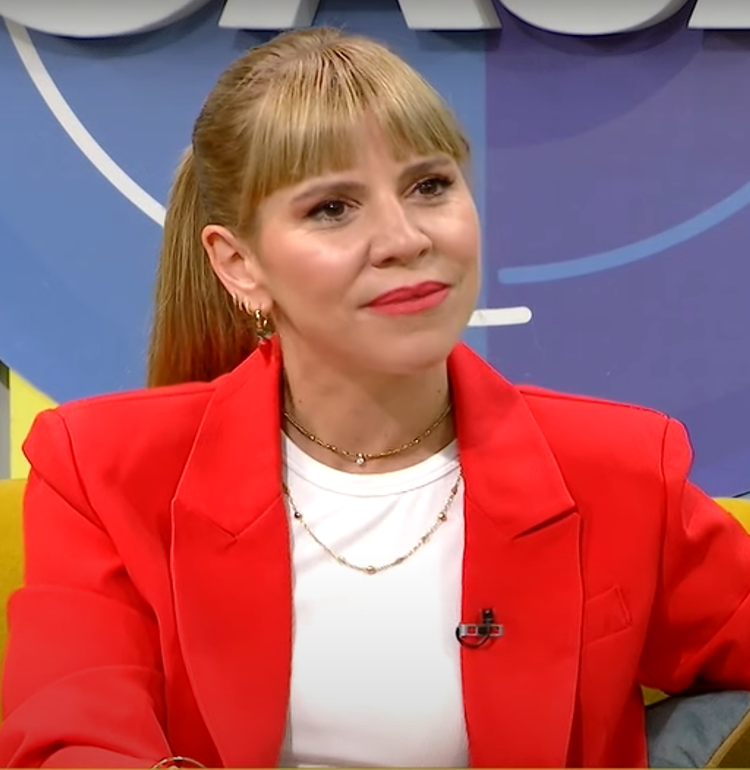
- Torres in 2023
- Born: María Ximena Torres Carrera; 1 December 1981 (age 44); Montevideo, Uruguay
- Education: Catholic University of Uruguay; University of the Republic
- Occupations: Chef; restaurateur; television personality; businesswoman
- Television: MasterChef Uruguay (2019–); Subrayado (2021–present)
- Spouse: Max Capote (m. 2014)
- Children: 2
- Website: ladulceria.com.uy

Maria Ximena Torres Carrera (born 1 December 1981) is a Uruguayan chef, restaurateur, businesswoman and television personality. She has presented on different cooking shows, and has served as a judge on MasterChef Uruguay and its spin-offs since 2019.

== Early life and education ==
Maria Ximena Torres Carrera was born in Montevideo on 1 December 1981, the daughter of Montserrat Carrera and Marco Antonio Torres. She has two sisters, Carolina and Rossana. She is of Catalan and Chilean descent. Her maternal grandparents immigrated to Uruguay in 1950 from Sant Joan Despí, Catalonia, Spain, and founded the renowned Confitería Carrera food business. Raised in the Pocitos barrio, Torres attended Queen's School and the Montevideo Pre-University Institute (PREU).

Torres earned a degree in communication studies with a specialization as a publicist from the Catholic University of Uruguay. In 2003 she was awarded a scholarship to study fine arts at Valdosta State University, Georgia. She subsequently graduated as a sommelier from the University of the Republic, as a member of the first generation in 2007. That year she settled for a season in Vic, Barcelona, where she took courses to become a professional in chocolate skills.

== Career ==
=== Culinary career ===
Torres began working professionally in gastronomy in 2000 and in catering in 2003. In 2012 she opened La Dulcería de Xime, a pastry shop and cafeteria located in the Punta Carretas barrio. In subsequent years it expanded to different points in Montevideo and throughout Uruguay.

=== Television and media career ===
In 2010 she made her debut on television, as the presenter of the culinary segment of the Teledoce morning show, Día perfecto. The following year, her segment became the daily program La Receta Perfecta, in which Torres cooked different dishes accompanied by guests and two puppet characters making fun of different situations. The show was on the air until 2014, when she decided to step away from television.

In 2015, she published Comer y reír: manual para acercarse a la cocina con alegría, a book she co-authored with the presenter and comedian Manuela da Silveira, and in which they presented different tips and culinary proposals. In 2017 she returned to the media, as co-host of the TV Ciudad cooking show, La vuelta al plato. Broadcast for three seasons until 2019, the program consisted of making dishes from different parts of the world while learning about their history and their relationship with cultures.

In February 2019 Channel 10 cast Torres as a judge of MasterChef Uruguay, as a replacement for Lucía Soria. She was part of the fifth season of the version for amateur chefs and all four seasons of the spin-off featuring celebrities. In July 2021, she joined the Subrayado newscast as a gastronomic journalism columnist. In December 2020, she presented her cookbook, Casero es mejor, which in 2021 was awarded the best Latin American cookbook at the Gourmand Award in Paris.

== Personal life ==
Torres met the musician Max Capote while she was hosting La Receta Perfecta, a program he attended as a guest, and a short time later they began dating. They got married on 14 February 2014. The couple have two children, Juan Jacinto (b. December 2017) and María Guadalupe (b. August 2019).

== Filmography ==
Year	Title	Role	Notes
2010–2011	Día Perfecto	Herself	Columnist
2011–2014	La Receta Perfecta	Herself	Presenter
2017–2019	La Vuelta al Plato	Herself	Co-presenter
2019; 2024–present	MasterChef Uruguay	Herself	Judge; 5th Season
2020–2023	MasterChef Celebrity	Herself	Judge
2021–present	Subrayado	Herself	Columnist

== Published works ==
- Recetas para contar (2010) ISBN 9789974494985
- Comer y reír: manual para acercarse a la cocina con alegría (2015) ISBN 9789974723443
- Casero es mejor (2020) ISBN 9789974868120
