= TV Ciudad =

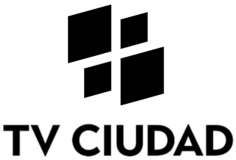
- Country: Uruguay
- Broadcast area: Uruguay
- Headquarters: Montevideo, Uruguay

Programming
- Language: Spanish
- Picture format: 1080i (HDTV) (downscaled to 16:9 576i for the SDTV feed)

Ownership
- Owner: Ministry of Education and Culture
- Parent: Intendancy of Montevideo

History
- Launched: September 1996
- Former names: Tevé Ciudad (1996–2012)

Links
- Website: tvciudad.uy

Availability

Terrestrial
- Digital VHF: Channel 6.1 (PSIP 32 UHF)

TV Ciudad (English: City TV) is an Uruguayan national television station owned by the Intendancy of Montevideo. Founded in 1996, the channel was established as a cultural service with a local component.

== History ==
=== As a cable channel ===
In 1995, with the appearance of the first cable television companies, the Departmental Intendancy of Montevideo decided not to pay the installation costs to the three companies (TCC, Montecable and Nuevo Siglo), but to create a slot for a local public channel. In 1996, the third public TV channel in Uruguay (the second was Canal 8 Melo, which was an affiliate of Channel 5 from Montevideo) launched with coverage on cable in Montevideo and its metropolitan area.

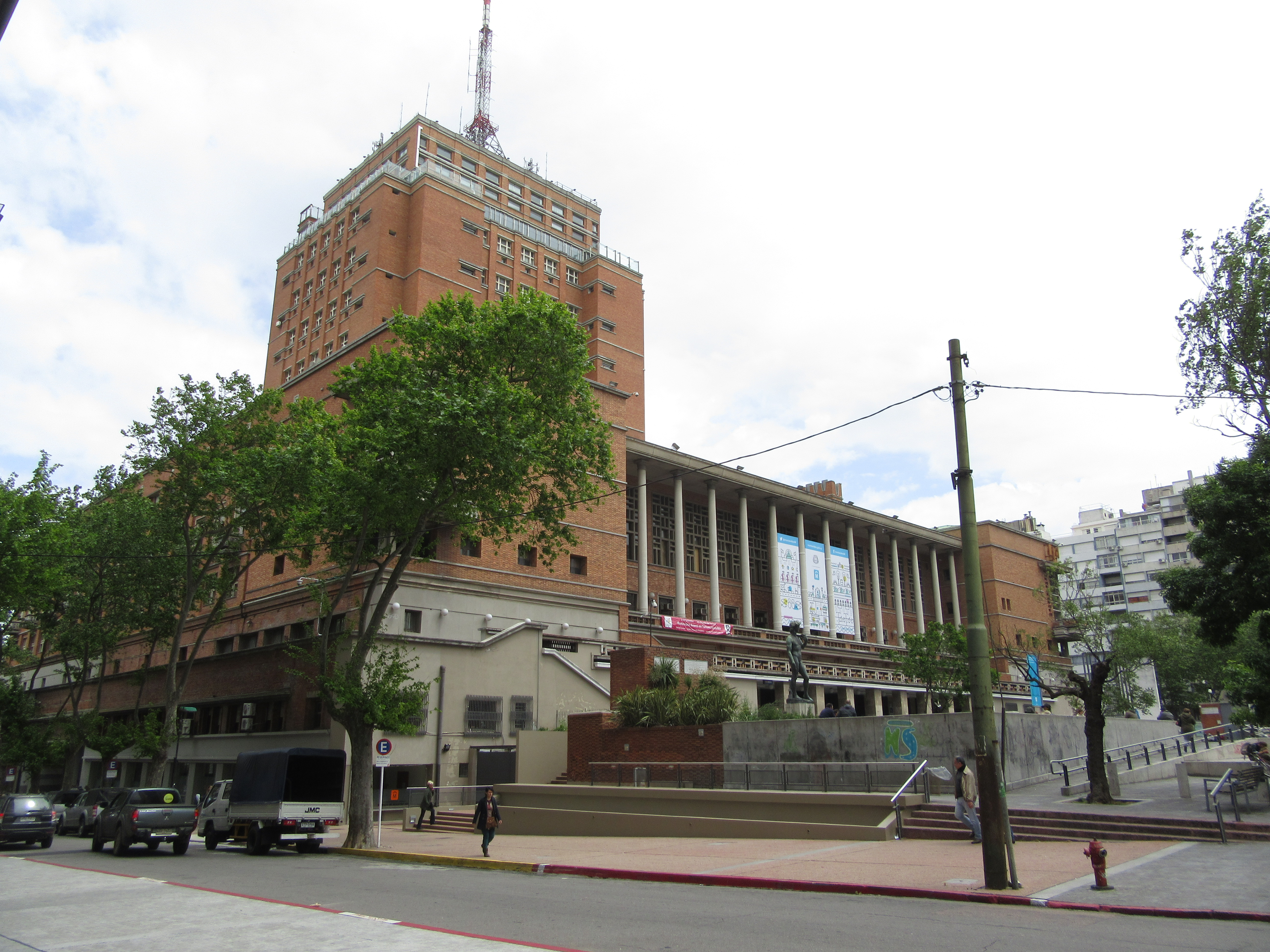
TV Ciudad's antenna, atop the Municipal Palace of Montevideo

When it started broadcasting, it operated on a six-hour schedule using existing audiovisual products, with a wide amount of national music productions, made by independent production companies. During this period, the channel became a reference in national culture as well as providing stimulus in the innovation in formats, narratives and audiovisual aesthetics.

In 1998, Tevé Ciudad moved to its own location at Javier Barrios Amorín 1460 Street, also acquiring basic equipment for studio recordings and a minimum number of staff which it worked under contract. At this time, it broadcast fifteen hours a day, airing its programming in three five-hour cycles. In 1999, upon obtaining its own digital equipment, it started broadcasting 24 hours a day, administering the station from its headquarters.

Since 2006, it started broadcasting online on Antel's website.

=== Becoming an over-the-air station (2012–2016) ===
In 2011, with the appearance of digital terrestrial television in Uruguay and following the municipal five-year plan for 2010–2015, the plan to turn Tevé Ciudad into an over-the-air station emerged. The plans started in April of that year, initially hoping to use one of TNU's four intended digital slots. The desire of becoming an OTA station came since its early years, but the plan only solidified when digital broadcasts became a viable option.

In 2013, its audiovisual archives were declared a historic national monument by the Ministry of Education and Culture. At the time of declaration, its archives had over 9,000 hours of audiovisual content, constituting itself as one of the country's main archives.

At noon on March 29, 2015, Tevé Ciudad started broadcasting its over-the-air signal.

=== As TV Ciudad ===
Tevé Ciudad was renamed TV Ciudad in May 2016, coinciding with its twentieth anniversary. The new name was accompanied by new programming such as Después vemos, Informe Capital (which premiered in April) and Guía 19172, a program about cannabis.

On August 1, 2019, the station started broadcasting on DirecTV Uruguay. That year, it covered the presidential elections in Uruguay, as well as De cerca, where Facundo Ponce de León interviewed all presidential candidates, and Crónicas de campañas, regarding their campaigns.

In 2020, the channel unveils a modified logo. From June 15 of that year, it was made available to DirecTV in Argentina and Chile, marking its international expansion.

In 2025, reports emerged in the press that Mario Bergara's governance of Montevideo caused changes to the channel, among them, the main edition of MVD Noticias was limited to only one presenter, displacing Natalia Nogués to a new health program. Several programs left the schedule: La Letra Chica(Maite Sarasola and Jorge Temponi), MVD Noticias Domingo (José María Caraballo), De Ida y Vuelta (Florencia Infante, Yamandú Cardozo and Pablo Silvera) and Sin Fronteras (Álvaro Padrón). In addition, Infante and Cardozo, alongside Lucila Rada, co-presenter of Mirá Montevideo, also left.
