= Elvira Salvo =

Uruguayan media entrepreneur and philanthropist

María Elvira Salvo Ferreri, also known as Elvira Salvo or Elvira Salvo de Romay (Montevideo, 2 March 1905 – Montevideo, 16 July 2009) was a Uruguayan radio and television entrepreneur and philanthropist. She was one of the pioneers of television in her country.

== Biography ==
His father Lorenzo had the Salvo Palace built in the 1920s. She married Carlos Romay, founder of Radio Monte Carlo, together they had four sons: Carlos, Walter, Hugo and Daniel; later she became a widow.

In 1961, together with her son Hugo, they established Monte Carlo TV Canal 4. In 1966 she established Río Uruguay Televisión in Fray Bentos; and in 1969 she purchased CX 12 Radio Oriental.

Elvira Salvo Elvira carried out numerous charitable works, especially for the Cottolengo Don Orione.
