= Channel 3 (Colonia, Uruguay) =

Canal 3 Colonia (CXB23)
Colonia del Sacramento, Colonia Department; Uruguay
- Channels: Analog: 3 (VHF); Digital: 28 (UHF); Virtual: 3.1

Programming
- Affiliations: Canal 4

Ownership
- Owner: Grupo Monte Carlo; (Canal 3 Colonia SA)

History
- First air date: 22 October 1971

Technical information
- Licensing authority: URSEC

Canal 3 Colonia is an Uruguayan television station that broadcasts from Colonia del Sacramento for that city and part of Buenos Aires on channel 3. It's an affiliate of Channel 4 of Montevideo, and shows a mix of network and off-network programming: telenovelas, Argentinian shows, newscasts (both local and from the network), cartoons and movies. The station received a prize from the Argentine association Luchemos por la Vida on 1996 and 2002 for voluntarily showing their driving education spots.

The station is one of the many assets owned by the Romay family, owners of several private television stations across the country, as well as Red Uruguaya de Televisión, S.A., which is part-owned by Canal 4. From Monte Carlo's interests in Equital, it owns the local cable company Del Faro TV Cable.

== Programming ==
The channel broadcasts the Susana Giménez program with a one-day delay, the Argentine series Casi Ángeles (internationally known as Teenangels), the local news program 30 Minutos, the national morning show Buen Día Uruguay, national newscasts Sunday to Friday, cartoons on weekday middays and weekend mornings, several telenovelas, Hollywood movies on some weeknights and during the weekend's afternoons, plus the occasional cultural/educational program.
