= Eduardo Gianarelli =

Uruguayan television presenter, actor and dancer (born 1985)

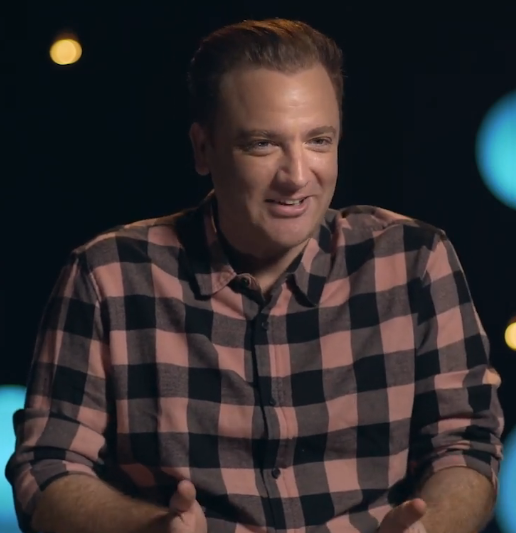
- Gianarelli in 2023
- Born: Eduardo Martín Gianarelli Mantel; November 20, 1985 (age 40); Montevideo, Uruguay
- Occupations: Television presenter; dancer; actor; carnival performer
- Years active: 1997–present
- Spouse: Clara Cristóbal (m. 2017)
- Children: 2

Eduardo Martín Gianarelli Mantel (born November 20, 1985) is a Uruguayan television presenter, dancer and actor. He has presented several television shows for Channel 4 and Channel 10, including Agitando una más (2010–2021), MasterChef (2024–2025) and Gran Hermano (2026–present). He has also participated in musical and theatrical carnival productions within the official Uruguayan Carnival competition.

== Early life ==
Eduardo Gianarelli Mantel was born on 20 November 1985 in Montevideo, the son of Carlos Gianarelli and Rosa Mantel. He has two siblings, Patricia and Bruno, and is of Italian ancestry. He was raised in the La Figurita neighbourhood, where he attended public primary schools before completing his secondary education at the Elbio Fernández School.

He initially enrolled in the Systems Analyst programme at the University of the Republic, but withdrew shortly before completing his degree. Following a gap year, he enrolled at the Instituto de Profesores Artigas, from which he graduated in 2018 as a mathematics teacher. He subsequently taught at several secondary schools in Montevideo, including the Alfredo Vásquez Acevedo Institute.

== Career ==
During his childhood, he worked as a television commercial model, including in advertisements produced for international markets, and trained in ballet. In 1997, at the age of 12, he made his television debut on Channel 4’s comedy show Jugo de colores, where he portrayed various characters in comedy sketches. Around the same time, he made his Carnival debut at the age of 13, participating in the revue show Rebelión, in which he sang and danced, earning the “Breakthrough Performer” award. He returned to the production in 1998, and in 1999 joined the comedy troupe Los Carlitos, again receiving the same distinction, before performing a year later alongside dancer and lubolo comparsa director Julio "Kanela" Sosa in Kanela y su Baracutanga.

In 2009, he returned to television as a field reporter on Channel 4’s variety and entertainment programme Agitando una más, hosted by Omar Gutiérrez Larré. Initially covering youth-oriented venues such as nightclubs and festivals, he later became the presenter’s on-screen assistant. In 2010, following Gutiérrez’s departure, Gianarelli assumed hosting duties, initially joined by Matías Rosende and Cinthya Durán, and subsequently by Analaura Barreto and Pablo Magno. The programme received multiple nominations for the Iris Awards in the Best Entertainment Program category, winning the award at the 23rd ceremony in 2018. From 2014 onwards, he also presented Channel 4’s New Year's Eve specials.

In July 2021, Agitando una más was taken off the air after 12 consecutive seasons. In November of the same year, Gianarelli joined Channel 10, where he premiered Dale que va, a programme of similar format co-hosted with Pablo Magno and Analaura Barreto, which remained on air until 2024. He was also appointed host of Pasión de Carnaval, a programme dedicated to the coverage of Uruguay’s Carnival celebrations, particularly the official competition held annually at the Teatro de Verano. He hosted the 2022 and 2023 editions following the departure of Jorge Echagüe, and was later succeeded in the role by sports journalist and presenter Alejandro Sonsol, son of Alberto Sonsol.

In March 2022, he was announced as one of the celebrity contestants on the third season of MasterChef Celebrity Uruguay, which he went on to win. Since January 2024, he has co-hosted La mañana en casa on Channel 10. In late May, he was appointed presenter of the new season of MasterChef Uruguay, and in February 2025 replaced Patricia Madrid as host of the talk show Polémica en el bar.

On 18 February 2026, he was announced as the host of Gran Hermano, the Uruguayan adaptation of the Big Brother format.

== Personal life ==
In April 2017, he married Clara Cristóbal, whom he had publicly introduced in 2015. The couple have two children: Felipe (born 2018) and Lorenzo (born 2021).

== Filmography ==
Year	Title	Role	Notes
1997	Jugo de colores	Various roles	Sketches actor
2009	Agitando una más	Himself	Reporter and assistant
2010–2021	Agitando una más	Himself	Co-host
2021–2024	Dale que va	Himself	Co-host
2022	Celebrity MasterChef Uruguay	Himself	Contestant; Winner
2022–2023	Pasión de Carnaval	Himself	Host
2024–2025	MasterChef Uruguay	Himself	Host
2024–present	La mañana en casa	Himself	Co-host
2025–presente	Polémica en el bar	Himself	Host
2026	Gran Hermano	Himself	Host
