= Vamo Arriba =

- Genre: Daytime show
- Presented by: Giannina Silva; Federico Paz; Gastón González; Marcelo Bornio
- Country of origin: Uruguay
- Original language: Spanish

Production
- Production locations: Channel 4 Headquarters, Montevideo
- Running time: 210 minutes
- Production company: Sinapsis Productora de Ideas

Original release
- Network: Channel 4
- Release: December 3, 2018 – present

Vamo arriba is an Uruguayan daytime television show that is broadcast on Channel 4. It debuted on December 3, 2018 and is presented by Giannina Silva, Gastón González and Federico Paz. The weekday program airs from 10:30 a.m. to 12:30 p.m. It was expanded to weekends with the debut of a Sunday edition on August 21, 2021.

== History ==
The program began to be broadcast on December 3, 2018, as part of a renovation and structuring of the morning programming of Channel 4. The first guest of the program was the historic figure of the Uruguayan carnival, Julio "Kanela" Sosa and the first dish cooked was a chivito.

== Sections ==
- Jenga Vila: Andy Vila leads this game where she and the guest must play Jenga, while the interview is held.
- Sal o Pimienta: Viewers communicate to play and participate for a $20,000 cash prize. Conducted by Gastón González.
- Móvil en vivo: Pablo Magno leaves the studio and transmits from different parts of the city.

== On-air staff ==
Weekday editions

- Giannina Silva (Co-Host; 2022–present)
- Gastón González (Co-Host; 2018–present)
- Federico Paz (Co-Host; 2018–present)
- Marcelo Bornio (Chef; 2018–present)
- Anahí Lange (Reporter; 2018–present)

Sunday editions

- Luis Alberto Carballo (Co-Host; 2021–present)
- Analaura Barreto (Co-Host; 2021–present)
- Alejandro Sonsol (Co-Host; 2021–present)

=== Former on-air staff ===
- Pablo Magno (Reporter; 2018–2021)
- Andy Vila (Co-Host; 2018–2022)

== Sunday edition ==
Due to the good audience ratings of the program, and a new change in the channel's programming, a Sunday edition of the program was released on August 21, 2021, entitled Vamo Arriba que es Domingo. Hosted by Luis Alberto Carballo, Analaura Barreto and Alejandro Sonsol, the first broadcast led the audience with an average audience share of 6.4 points according to Kantar Ibope Media.
