= Andy Vila =

Uruguayan actress, model and television presenter

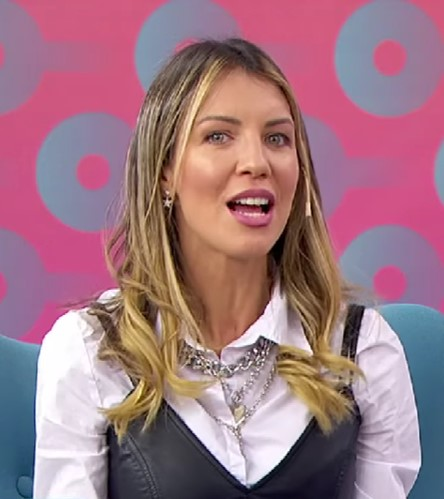
- Vila in 2024
- Born: Andrea Laura Vila Pereira; January 30, 1987 (age 38); Montevideo, Uruguay
- Occupations: Actress; model; presenter; television personality
- Years active: 2006–present

Andrea Laura Vila Pereira (born January 30, 1987) mostly known as Andy Vila, is a Uruguayan actress, model and television presenter. She began her media career at the age of eighteen, on the sketch comedy show El Show del mediodía.

== Early life ==
Andrea Vila was born on January 30, 1987, in Montevideo, Uruguay. She attended Elbio Fernández School. Her relatives already knew in her childhood that she was going to be an "artist."

== Career ==
At just 7 years old, she began attending theater classes. She began working on advertisements, catwalks and photo campaigns. At the age of 18 she auditioned and was selected to participate in the Teledoce's sketch comedy series El show del mediodía in 2005. The following year, after the success she had in the previous program, she was summoned to participate in the Uruguayan soap opera, La Oveja Negra, and in the film 14 días en el paraíso. That same year she started presenting Click on Nuevo Siglo TV.

In 2009 she co-starred in the movie Bad Day to Go Fishing, portraying Maria Victoria. In 2011 he was a recurring character in Adicciones. The next year he gave life to Lydia in the movie La culpa del cordero. In the summer of 2012-2013, she served as a reporter for the Uruguayan show Verano Perfecto and the Argentine Bien de Verano. In 2013, Vila made her premiere at the theater with Encadenados, where she toured the entire country. In 2014, she continued in Verano Perfecto but with a new, leading role. From 2015 to 2017 she was a panelist for the morning television show Desayunos informales.

From September 2018 to January 2019 she hosted Channel 4's Modo avión travel program. On December 3, 2018, she began co-hosting Vamo Arriba, Channel 4's daytime television show. From September 2021 to mid-2022, she hosted Los 8 escalones―Edición Famosos, a spin-off of the game show Los 8 escalones featuring celebrities. On December 16, 2022, she left Vamo Arriba, claiming that she wanted to dedicate herself to caring for her newborn daughter.

== Filmography ==
=== Television ===
Year	Title	Role	Notes	Channel
2006	El Show del Mediodía		Host assistant	Teledoce
2007	La Oveja Negra		Special participation	Teledoce
2007-15	Click	Herself	Host	Nuevo Siglo TV
2008	El Lolo	Natalia		Teledoce
2008	Los profesionales del espectáculo	Herself	Special participation	Teledoce
2011	Adicciones		Recurring	Teledoce
2012-13	Luxo		Recurring	El Nueve
2012-13	Verano Perfecto	Herself	Reporter	Teledoce
2014	Verano Perfecto	Herself	Panelist	Teledoce
2015-17	Desayunos informales	Herself	Panelist	Teledoce
2018-19	Modo avión	Herself	Host	Channel 4
2018-2022	Vamo Arriba	Herself	Co-Host	Channel 4
2021	Los 8 escalones - Celebrity Edition	Herself	Anchor	Channel 4
2024	¿Quién es la máscara?	Choclo	Contestant; 12th Eliminated	Teledoce

=== Movies ===
Year	Movie		Rol	Director
2007	(Uruguay)	14 días en el paraíso	Minor role	Bill Marks
2009	(Uruguay)	Bad Day to Go Fishing	Cecilia	Álvaro Brechner
2012	(Uruguay)	La culpa del cordero	Lydia	Gabriel Drak

=== Theater ===
Year	Title		Character	Director
2013	(Uruguay)	Encadenados		Alfredo Goldstein

== Personal life ==
Vila began a relationship with Emiliano Álvarez in 2013. They separated in May 2019, but got back together in July 2020. On November 22, 2021, during the live broadcast of Vamo Arriba, she announced that she was pregnant with her first child.
