= Miss Uruguay 2010 =

- Date: February 27, 2010
- Venue: Salón Montecarlo del Conrad Punta del Este Resort & Casino, Punta del Este, Uruguay
- Broadcaster: TV Ciudad
- Entrants: 22
- Placements: 10
- Debuts: Punta del Este; Río de la Plata
- Returns: Cerro Largo; Flores; Florida; Lavalleja; Rocha
- Winner: Stephany Ortega (Rocha); Miss Universo Uruguay 2010; Eliana Olivera (Maldonado); Miss Mundo Uruguay 2010
- Congeniality: María Marchioro; Flores
- Best National Costume: Reina Mota; Canelones
- Photogenic: Natalie Yoffe; Florida Department

The Miss Uruguay 2010 was held on February 27, 2010. The winners will represent Uruguay at Miss Universe 2010 and Miss World 2010. The first runner-up will go to Miss International 2010. The Best Departemental Costume would be used in Miss Universe. There were 22 candidates competing for the two titles.

== Results ==
=== Placements ===
Placement	Contestant
Miss Universo Uruguay 2010	Rocha – Stephany Ortega
Miss Mundo Uruguay 2010	Maldonado – Eliana Oliveira
1st Runner-Up	Rivera – Evangelina Lechini
2nd Runner-Up	Florida – Natalie Yoffe
3rd Runner-Up	Treinta y Tres – Rocío da Silva
Top 10	Cerro Largo – Martina Graf; Distrito Capital – Natalia Molfino; Lavalleja – Jéssica Benítez; Paysandú – Alejandra Piedracueva; Tacuarembó – Valeria Sánchez

=== Special awards ===
- Miss Photogenic (voted by press reporters) - Natalie Yoffe (Florida)
- Miss Congeniality (voted by Miss Uruguay contestants) - María Marchioro (Flores)
- Miss Internet - Natalie Yoffe (Florida)
- Best Look - Lorena Carrasco (Durazno)
- Best Face - Natalie Yoffe (Florida)
- Best Departemental Costume - Reina Mota (Canelones)

== Delegates ==
Departments	Contestant	Age	Height	Hometown
Artigas	Agustina Trindade	19	1.69	Montevideo
Canelones	Reina Mota	22	1.83	Canelones
Cerro Largo	Martina Graf Guarinoni	20	1.68	Montevideo
Colonia	Sandra Sosa	27	1.71	Colonia
Distrito Capital	Natalia Molfino	18	1.70	Montevideo
Durazno	Lorena Carrasco	25	1.80	Durazno
Flores	María Eugenia Marchioro	18	1.72	Florida
Florida	Natalie Yoffe Vargas	24	1.81	Florida
Lavalleja	Jéssica Benítez	19	1.75	Montevideo
Maldonado	Eliana Olivera	22	1.74	Montevideo
Montevideo	Ana de la Mota	25	1.78	Brazo Oriental
Paysandú	Alejandra Piedracueva	23	1.71	Maldonado
Punta del Este	Janet Bortennelly	20	1.79	Punta del Este
Rio de la Plata	Rosario Castellanos	26	1.77	Montevideo
Rio Negro	Andrea Venzzoso	18	1.70	Artigas
Rivera	Evangelina Lechini	22	1.70	Salto
Rocha	Stephany Ortega	20	1.73	Montevideo
Salto	Jéssica Guell	22	1.73	Colonia
San José	Valeria Ferreira	18	1.75	Paysandú
Soriano	Ana Mariana Domínguez	21	1.68	Salto
Tacuarembó	Valeria Sánchez	18	1.80	Montevideo
Treinta y Tres	Rocío Da Silva	22	1.70	Montevideo

== Official website ==
- Miss Universo Uruguay
