= El Nueve de Rocha =

El Nueve de Rocha (CXB 9)
- Rocha; Uruguay
- Channels: Analog: 9 (VHF); Digital: 35 (UHF); Virtual: 9.1

Programming
- Affiliations: La Red

History
- Founded: 27 January 1966
- First air date: 7 August 1966
- Former channel numbers: Analog: 7 (VHF, 1966–1991)

Technical information
- Licensing authority: URSEC

Links
- Website: www.canal9telerocha.com.uy

El Nueve de Rocha (channel 9), also known under its former commercial name of Telerocha, is a Uruguayan commercial television station licensed to Rocha, capital of the department of the same name.

== History ==
The station set up its equipment in 1964, the first case in which all of its equipment was assembled within Uruguay. Subsequently, on 27 January 1966, the government gave a license for Telerocha to operate on VHF channel 7. Broadcasts started on 7 August 1966. In its early weeks, the station broadcast entirely during evening hours. On weeknights it turned on its transmitter at 7pm, airing a test pattern with regular programming following at 7:30pm. On Saturdays, programming started at 7pm and on Sundays, at 6:30pm. The station at the time aired local news, plays, American TV series and some dubbed feature films.

On 7 July 1991, it exchanged frequencies with Canal 7 from Punta del Este.

The station also operates a cable company under the name of Rodacil (commercial name Telerocha Cable), which was part of the larger Equital group, led by the three commercial stations of Montevideo. In 1998, it had 4,060 households subscribed to the service, which provided 33 channels.

== Technical information ==
On 7 December 2023, URSEC approved Telerocha's digital operation on physical channel 35.
