= Sergio Puglia =

Uruguayan chef

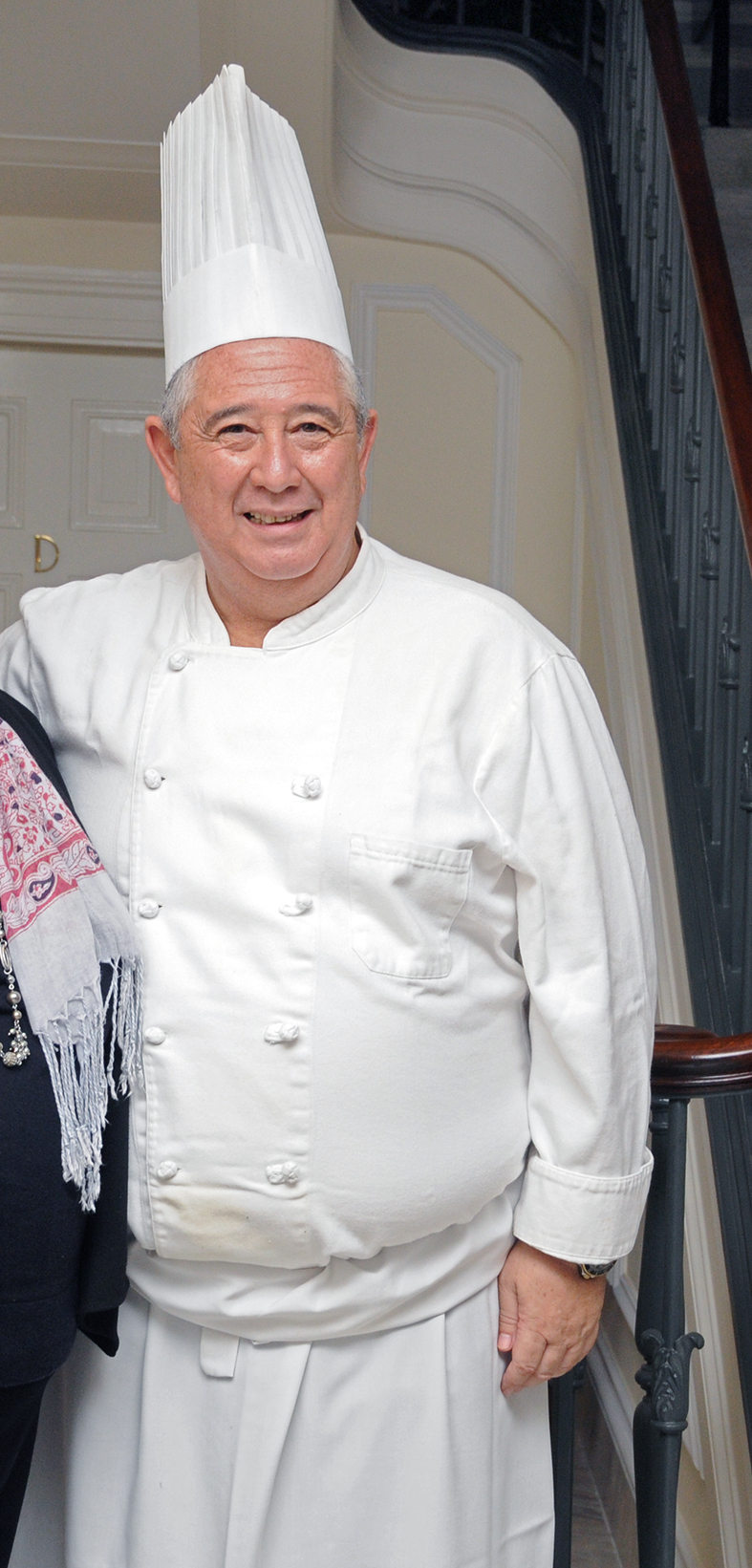
- Sergio Puglia in 2014
- Born: Sergio Daniel Puglia Silva; 28 January 1950 (age 76); Montevideo, Uruguay
- Education: University of Salzburg
- Occupations: chef, presenter, businessman
- Spouse: Horacio Correa (2016-present)
- Awards: Premio Iris; Premio Legión del Libro

Sergio Daniel Puglia Silva (born 28 January 1950) is a Uruguayan chef, restaurateur, presenter and businessman.

== Career ==
Sergio Puglia states he completed a master's in hospitality and gastronomy at the University of Salzburg (Austria), with no publicly available official documentation to confirm it University of Salzburg. In the business sector he managed the restaurant Luciano Federico, owned by Juan Carlos López Mena. He served as gastronomic director of Buquebus until 1993 and managed his own restaurant Puglia Restaurante. He also serves as a gastronomy professor at the Technical Hotel Institute of Uruguay, of which he is the founder.

=== Television ===
He was a producer and columnist in various media. His first program was El Club de la Buena Vida broadcast by National Television. Since 1990 he has been presenting the interview program Puglia Invita, initially broadcast on National Television and later on Channel 10. He also presented different programs on that channel, for example, TVEO a Diario, La Noche, Malas Compañías, Puglia & Compañía, Con gusto and En su salsa.

Between 2017 and 2019 he served as a judge in the four seasons of MasterChef Uruguay, broadcast by Channel 10. He also participated in its spin-offs MasterChef Profesionales and MasterChef Celebrity. Since 2019 he has been part of the panel of Polémica en el Bar.

=== Radio ===
Currently, together with Jaime Clara, he hosts the radio program Al Pan Pan broadcast by Radio Sarandí.

== Personal life ==
In January 2016 he announced his commitment to Horacio Correa, after 14 years of relationship. The wedding was held on November 23. The ceremony was attended by 600 people and among the guests from the Argentine and Uruguayan entertainment scene were Susana Giménez, Cristina Alberó, Martín Bossi, Rúben Rada, among others. Members of Uruguayan politics also attended, such as former President Julio María Sanguinetti, former first lady Marta Canessa, then Minister of Education and Culture María Julia Muñoz, then Intendant of Montevideo Daniel Martínez, as well as Luis Lacalle Pou, Beatriz Argimón and Ana Olivera.

=== Politics ===
Puglia has publicly expressed his support for the National Party. In 2019 he endorsed Luis Lacalle Pou's campaign for the 2019 general election in a document signed by 134 other personalities of Uruguayan culture. In August 2023, he formally joined the party as a member of its Culture Commission. In 2024, he was part of the Lista 5 electoral list that supported the candidacy of Álvaro Delgado Ceretta for the 2024 presidential primaries.
