= La mañana en casa =

- Genre: Daytime television; News and current affairs
- Presented by: Eduardo Gianarelli; Petru Valensky; Eliana Dide; Magdalena Correa
- Country of origin: Uruguay
- Original language: Spanish

Production
- Running time: 120 minutes (includes adverts)

Original release
- Network: Channel 10
- Release: 15 March 2015 – present

La mañana en casa (English: Morning at Home) is a Uruguayan daytime television programme that is broadcast on Channel 10. It first aired on 9 March 2015 and is broadcast live every weekday from 10:30 am to 12:30 pm. The programme features a wide range of content, including news, interviews, politics, sports, entertainment, competitions, weather forecasts, and local news bulletins.

== On-air staff ==
- Iñaki Abadie (Host; 2015–2016)
- Rafael Cotelo (Host; 2015–2017)
- Martín Rodríguez (Host; 2016–2017)
- María Inés Obaldía (Host; 2015–2020)
- Petru Valensky (Host; 2015–present)
- Kairo Herrera (Host; 2017–2023)
- Noelia Etcheverry (Host; 2017–2024)
- Humberto de Vargas (Host; 2021)
- Eliana Dide (Host; 2021–presente)
- Eduardo Gianarelli (Host; 2024–2026)
- Magdalena Correa (Host; 2025–present)
