= Miss Universo Uruguay 2007 =

- Date: March 17, 2007
- Venue: Salón Montecarlo del Conrad Punta del Este Resort & Casino, Punta del Este, Uruguay
- Broadcaster: TV Ciudad
- Entrants: 20
- Winner: Giannina Silva; Artigas

Miss Universo Uruguay 2007 was on March 17, 2007. There were 20 candidates for the national title. The winner was Uruguay at Miss Universe 2007 and Reina Hispanoamericana 2007. The first runner up entered Miss Tourism Queen International 2008 and Miss Atlantico. The second runner up was Miss Continente Americano 2007. The Best Departemental Costume was used in Miss Universe.

== Results ==
- Miss Universo Uruguay 2007 : Giannina Silva (Artigas)
- 1st Runner Up : Claudia Vanrell (Montevideo)
- 2nd Runner Up : Agostina Padula (Maldonado)
- 3rd Runner Up : Sofya Guerrero (Treinta y Tres)
- 4th Runner Up : Laura Zamora (Distrito Capital)

Top 10

- Cassie Spliggione (Florida)
- Sandra Velman (Río Negro)
- Eva Reynoza (Salto)
- Jonairys Tobías (Canelones)
- Fernanda Wilkos (San José)

=== Special awards ===
- Miss Photogenic (voted by press reporters) - Silvana Quadors (Rocha)
- Miss Congeniality (voted by Miss Universo Uruguay contestants) - Ana Espinoza (Tacuarembó)
- Miss Internet - Claudia Vanrell (Montevideo)
- Best Look - Agostina Padula (Maldonado)
- Best Face - Ericka Suarez (Cerro Largo)
- Beautiful Eyes - Arianna Ynoigline (Paysandú)
- Best Departemental Costume - Joana Torrado (Rivera)

== Delegates ==
- Artigas - Giannina Silva
- Canelones - Paula Miglionico
- Cerro Largo - Ericka Suarez
- Colonia - Ada Fernández
- Distrito Capital - Laura Zamora
- Durazno - Soila Urotea
- Flores - Masiela Málaga
- Florida - Cassie Spliggione
- Lavalleja - Luisa Fernández
- Maldonado - Agostina Padula
- Montevideo - Claudia Rossina Vanrell Escalante
- Paysandú - Arianna Ynoigline
- Río Negro - Sandra Velman
- Rivera - Joana Torrado
- Rocha - Silvana Quadors
- Salto - Eva Reynoza
- San José - Fernanda Wilkos
- Soriano - Carolina Foigli
- Tacuarembó - Ana Espinoza
- Treinta y Tres - Sofya Guerrero
