= Agitando una más =

- Genre: Variety show
- Presented by: Omar Gutiérrez Larré (2009–10); Eduardo Gianarelli (2010–21)
- Country of origin: Uruguay
- Original language: Spanish
- No. of series: 12

Production
- Running time: 300 minutes (includes adverts)

Original release
- Network: Channel 4
- Release: 15 August 2009 – 31 July 2021

Agitando una Más was a Uruguayan television variety show that was broadcast on Channel 4 from 15 August 2009 to 31 July 2021. The programme aired live every Saturday for five hours and featured performances by new and emerging local bands, guest interviews, and live games.

== Format ==
Agitando una Más was broadcast live and combined musical performances—primarily by tropical music bands—with guest interviews, comedy sketches, outdoor segments, and studio game sections. The programme was recorded before a live studio audience and included interactive games involving audience participation. It also served as a platform for local bands to gain wider exposure.

In each episode, two groups of secondary school students from different schools across the country competed in a series of games and challenges for the chance to win an all-expenses-paid graduation trip, most frequently to Florianópolis.

== On-air team ==
- Omar Gutiérrez Larré (Host; 2009–2010)
- Eduardo Gianarelli (Host; 2010–2021)
- Cinthya Durán (Co-host; 2010–2015)
- Matías Rosende (Co-host; 2011–2013)
- Analaura Barreto (Co-host; 2013–2021)
- Pablo Magno (Co-host; 2015–2021)
