= Los 8 escalones (Uruguayan game show) =

- Genre: Game show
- Based on: Los 8 escalones
- Directed by: Alfredo Caro
- Presented by: Gustaf van Perinostein; Martín Fablet
- Country of origin: Uruguay

Production
- Executive producer: Florencia Márquez
- Producers: Guzmán Laguarda; Belén Marfetan; Giuliana Cadimar; Guzmán Mateu; Mikaela Mateu; Daniela Casais
- Production locations: Channel 4 Headquarters, Montevideo
- Running time: 90 minutes

Original release
- Network: Channel 4
- Release: 16 March 2021 – 16 August 2022

Los 8 escalones (Spanish for The 8 steps) was an Uruguayan television game show based on the original Argentine series Los 8 escalones. It premiered on March 16, 2021 on Channel 4.

== Gameplay ==
The contestant must choose which "expert" wants to compete with. The game unfolds as the contestant answers general culture questions with four options and ascends an eight-step ladder as the answer is correct. A question corresponds to each step: if the participant answers correctly and the expert also answers, they go up one step; If the expert answers wrongly, go up two steps. If the participant answers wrong, descends one step and loses one of the three lives with which he begins to play. However, if the expert is also wrong, the participant remains on the same rung and does not lose any life. The game ends when all three lives are lost.

The main objective is to get to the eighth step. If the participant arrives, wins 20,000 pesos, but if answers correctly to a question from the experts, wins 50,000 pesos, and has the possibility of competing for the final prize, a 0 km car.

== Production ==
On December 29, 2020, Channel 4 announced that there would be a Uruguayan version of the Argentine television game show, Los 8 escalones, produced by Kuarzo Entertainment and hosted by Guido Kaczka. On February 1, 2021, it was confirmed that Gustaf van Perinostein would be the host of the show, his first time serving as a presenter on television. In addition, it was announced that the actor and musician Julio Frade and presenters Sebastián Beltrame and Valeria Tanco would be the "experts" of the show. On February 12, Andy Vila was confirmed as the host of the spin-off featuring celebrities, which premiered on Sunday 5 September.

As of March 31, 2022, Van Perinostein left the show, being replaced by Martín Fablet.
