= Elbio Fernández School =

Coordinates: 34.9088°S 56.1856°W

Elbio Fernández School and Lyceum
- Escuela y Liceo Elbio Fernández
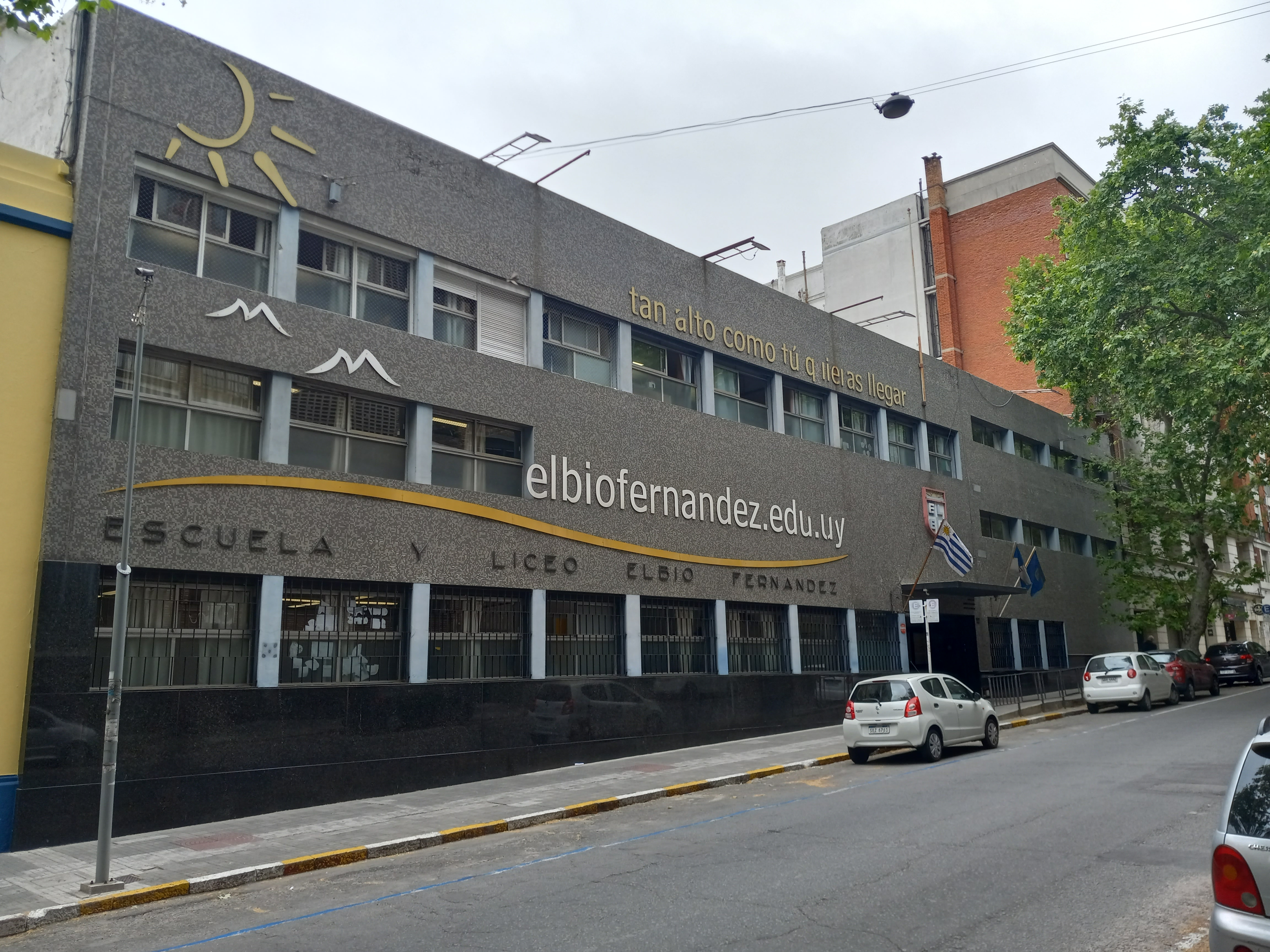
- Uruguay

Information
- Type: Private co-educational secular day school
- Motto: Luz más luz (Light more light)
- Established: 1869; 157 years ago
- Colors: Blue and White
- Nickname: ELEF, El Elbio
- Website: www.elbiofernandez.edu.uy

The Escuela y Liceo Elbio Fernández (Spanish for 'Elbio Fernández School and Lyceum') is a co-educational private school in Montevideo, Uruguay. Founded in 1869 as the first secular and private school in Uruguay and the main inspirer of the Varelian Reform, it provides day education to boys and girls aged 2–18.

It serves preschool, primary school, and secondary school, the senior high school programs, including the Bachillerato Diversificado and bilingual education by the International Baccalaureate. Since 2013, it also serves the degree in primary education teaching and a Licentiate in Education recognized by the Ministry of Education and Culture at the Elbio Fernández University Institute (IUEF).

Elbio Fernández School has educated a wide range of notable alumni, including intellectuals, athletes, media people, businessmen, and politicians such as 3 presidents of Uruguay and a vice president.

== History ==
The Escuela y Liceo Elbio Fernández was founded on September 3, 1869, by the Society of Friends of Popular Education (Spanish: Sociedad de Amigos de la Educación Popular, SAEP), a non-profit institution created in 1868 with the aim of promoting popular education, being inspired by the Varelian Reform –reform carried out by José Pedro Varela in 1876 that established free, compulsory and secular education in Uruguay–. Among the young founders and first members of the society are Carlos María Ramírez, Elbio Fernández and José Pedro Varela.

In 1915, Professor Jerónimo Zolesi founded the Liceo (high school), which is why it changed its name to Escuela y Liceo Elbio Fernández. Zolesi served as the high school principal, until his death in 1938.

The motto of the school, which is found on its shield, insignia and hymn is Luz más luz (Light, more light), the last sentence pronounced by Johann Wolfgang von Goethe before he died. In 2004, the school became the first private institution in the country to offer a technological baccalaureate in administration, construction, sports and recreation, information technology, and tourism, granting students technical degrees upon graduation from high school.

In 2019 on the occasion of the 150th Anniversary of the School, radio interviews were carried out with notable alumni.

== Campus ==
The Elbio Fernández School campus is currently located in multiple buildings in barrio Palermo, Montevideo, depending on the educational stage. Likewise, the institution has a sports field in Neptunia, Canelones Department.

== Alumni ==
Several prominent personalities in different fields have attended the Elbio Fernández School:

- Hugo Achugar, poet and essayist
- Gonzalo Aguirre Ramírez, politician and 10th Vice President of Uruguay
- Rodrigo Arocena, mathematician and academic
- Jorge Batlle Ibáñez, politician and 38th President of the Republic
- Roberto Caldeyro-Barcia, doctor
- Horacio Ferrer, writer and poet
- Federico García Vigil, conductor and composer
- Eduardo Gianarelli, television presenter
- Luis Alberto de Herrera, politician
- Antonio Larreta, critic and actor
- Martín Lema, politician
- Roberto Musso, musician
- Juan Andrés Ramírez, politician
- Julio César Ribas, former footballer
- José Enrique Rodó, essayist
- Dora Isella Russell, poet and journalist
- Julio María Sanguinetti, politician, 35th and 37th President of the Republic
- Giannina Silva, model and television personality
- Andy Vila, actress and television presenter
