= Dora Isella Russell =

Dora Isella Russell (May 15, 1925 – November 8, 1990) was an Argentine-born Uruguayan poet and journalist. Her works include: Sonetos (1943), El canto irremediable (1946), Oleaje (1949), El otro olvido (1952), Antología poética (1952), Del alba al mediodía (1954), Los barcos de la noche (1954), Tiempo y memoria (1964), El tiempo del regreso (1967), Los sonetos de Simbad (1970), Poemas hispanoamericanos (1977), and Memorial para Don Bruno Mauricio de Zabala (1977).

== Biography ==
Dora Isella Russell was born in Buenos Aires, Argentina, May 15, 1925. Her family moved to Montevideo, Uruguay in 1933, where she grew up. She received her education at Escuela y Liceo Elbio Fernández and then continued her studies in literature.

Russell taught as an associate professor. She was associated with the Nacional de Investigaciones y Archivos Literarios (National Institute for Literary Research and Archives). She was a disciple and secretary of the Uruguayan poet Juana de Ibarbourou.

Her activity as a journalist was carried out with articles published in the Uruguayan newspaper El Día and in intellectual magazines in the United States, Spain, France, Italy, Greece and Egypt. She was also the director of the Sunday Supplement of El Día and served as director of Museo Zorrilla.

== Awards and honours ==
For her career as a poet, she received recognition by the government of Lebanon and the National Order of Merit of Ecuador.

== Publications ==
- Sonetos (1943)
- El canto irremediable (1946)
- Oleaje (1949)
- El otro olvido (1952)
- Antología poética (1952)
- Del alba al mediodía (1954)
- Los barcos de la noche (1954)
- Tiempo y memoria (1964)
- El tiempo del regreso (1967)
- Los sonetos de Simbad (1970)
- Poemas hispanoamericanos (1977)
- Memorial para Don Bruno Mauricio de Zabala (1977)
- Los sonetos de Carass Court (1983)
