= Gran Hermano (Uruguayan TV series) =

- Genre: Reality television
- Based on: Big Brother by John de Mol Jr.
- Presented by: Eduardo Gianarelli
- Opening theme: "Vive"
- Country of origin: Uruguay
- Original language: Spanish

Production
- Production companies: Banijay; Kuarzo Entertainment

Original release
- Network: Channel 10

Gran Hermano (also known by the acronym GH) is the Uruguayan version of the international reality television franchise Big Brother created by producer John de Mol Jr. in 1999.

== History ==
The Big Brother reality series was created by John de Mol Jr. and premiered in the Netherlands. In Uruguay, the Argentine edition broadcast on Telefe consistently achieved strong ratings. As a result of a 2023 agreement between Telefe and Channel 10, beginning with the eleventh season Uruguayan contestants were incorporated into the competition. These included Bautista Mascia and Santiago Algorta, both of whom went on to win their respective seasons. The agreement further permitted viewers in Uruguay to vote via text message.

== Uruguayan production ==
In May 2025, Argentine producer Alejandro Ripoll confirmed that the house used for the Argentine edition would be repurposed for a forthcoming Uruguayan adaptation, expected to premiere in the latter half of 2026. This approach follows the precedent set by the Chilean version, aired between 2023 and 2024, which was produced in the same facilities owned by Kuarzo Entertainment.

On 14 October 2025, after several days of airing promotional spots featuring visual elements associated with the program — without explicitly confirming the project — the network officially announced the production of a Uruguayan adaptation of the format. On 18 February 2026, it was further announced that Eduardo Gianarelli would serve as the program’s host. On August 31, the premiere was confirmed for Sunday, September 20.

== Format ==
Gran Hermano is a reality television game show in which a group of contestants, known as “housemates,” live together in isolation from the outside world inside a custom-built house. The participants are continuously monitored by video surveillance and overseen by “Gran Hermano” — an unseen voice that observes their conduct, assigns weekly tasks and penalties, and relays their requests.

During their stay in the Gran Hermano house, each housemate is required to nominate two fellow contestants for possible eviction. The three or more contestants receiving the highest number of nominations are then placed to a public vote, with viewers ultimately deciding who will be evicted.

== Series overview ==
Series	Days	Housemates	Winner	Runner-up	Episodes	Originally released		
Series	Days	Housemates	Winner	Runner-up	Episodes	First released	Last released	Network
1	90	21	—	—	—	20 September 2026	TBA	Channel 10
