= MasterChef (Uruguayan TV series) =

Uruguayan cooking reality show

- Also known as: MasterChef Uruguay
- Genre: Cookery
- Created by: Franc Roddam
- Presented by: Diego González (2017–19) Eduardo Gianarelli (2024–25) Noelia Etcheverry (2026–)
- Judges: Sergio Puglia (2017–); Laurent Lainé (2017–); Lucía Soria (2017–18); Ximena Torres (2019–)
- Country of origin: Uruguay
- Original language: Spanish
- No. of seasons: 7
- No. of episodes: 166

Production
- Running time: 90 minutes
- Production company: Saeta

Original release
- Network: Channel 10
- Release: April 3, 2017 – September 5, 2019

MasterChef Uruguay is a Uruguayan competitive cooking game show that is broadcast on Channel 10. Based on the British series of the same name, it features amateur and home chefs. As of the show's seventh season, the line-up of judges consists of Sergio Puglia, Laurent Lainé Ximena Torres.

== Format ==
The winner plays for a prize that includes chef training from Crandon Institute, a trip to Girona to go to learn for 3 days at El Celler de Can Roca, and UYU$200,000 in cash.

The competition takes place in the MasterChef soundstage located in La Aguada, Montevideo which includes a supermarket, a restaurant, and a large kitchen area with several cooking stations which is overlooked by a balcony.

=== Challenges ===
In each episode the participants must overcome a challenge

- Mystery box: In this challenge, contestants have a box that hides ingredients or other things. With what they have in the box they have to cook a dish, without being able to go to the market to look for more ingredients. They can use all the ingredients they want from the box, be it one or all.
- Elimination Test: In this test will be the worst dishes of the previous test. They have to cook any dish, but that dish has to have a main ingredient chosen by the Chefs (in each elimination test the main ingredient will be different). In this test there is always only one loser, which is removed from MasterChef. This is the only test that is in every episode.
- Team Challenge: In this challenge the cooks are split into teams by team captains who is the one who chooses his teammates and who chooses what dishes to do. Captains are almost always the 2 winners of the previous test. Always in this challenge the judges are not the main Chefs but other people, generally several people.
- Challenge in pairs: In this test teams of two participants are formed. They have to make a dish chosen by each team. While one cooks the other stands to the side and can help you by talking and giving advice or warn you about something but cannot help you by cooking or touching something. After a certain time they rotate and the one who cooked, stands on one side talking to him and the other cooks. They always rotate more than 1 time.
- Master class: In this challenge, the contestants taste a dish cooked by a guest chef, and then they cook it with different ingredients for a certain time.

== History ==
Rumours of a Uruguayan adaptation of MasterChef began circulating in October 2016. In February 2017, the programme’s host and judging panel were officially confirmed. The series premiered on 3 April 2017. On 8 May 2017, during the broadcast of that evening’s episode, a second season of MasterChef Uruguay was announced. It was also confirmed that applications for the new edition would open shortly, and that contestants who had registered for the first season would not be required to apply again.

On 23 July 2017, the day before the first season’s finale, a special programme titled Road to the Grand Final was aired. The special followed the lives and experiences of the four finalists throughout the competition.

== Series overview ==
Season	Episodes	Originally released		Winner	Runner(s)-up	Judges		
Season	Episodes	Premiere date	Finale date	Winner	Runner(s)-up	1	2	3
1	17	April 3, 2017	July 24, 2017	Nilson Viazzo	Leticia Cicero	Sergio Puglia	Lucía Soria	Laurent Lainé
2	18	August 21, 2017	December 11, 2017	María Gracia Sosa	Luciana Dangelo	Sergio Puglia	Lucía Soria	Laurent Lainé
3	15	April 2, 2018	July 9, 2018	Alicia Patella	Gisela Meissner	Sergio Puglia	Lucía Soria	Laurent Lainé
4	40	April 22, 2019	September 5, 2019	Natalia González	Sebastián Piñeyro	Sergio Puglia	Ximena Torres	Laurent Lainé
5	34	June 11, 2024	December 18, 2024	Pablo Núñez	Bruno Sande	Sergio Puglia	Ximena Torres	Laurent Lainé
6	42	June 16, 2025	December 11, 2025	Pedro Strauch	Sebastián Risotto	Sergio Puglia	Ximena Torres	Laurent Lainé
7	46	April 7, 2026	September 10, 2026	Rodrigo Tacuariti	Lucía Brunoni	Sergio Puglia	Ximena Torres	Laurent Lainé

== 1st season: 2017 ==
Contestant	Age	Occupation	Hometown	Final position
Nilson Viazzo	36	Police	Florida	Winner
Leticia Cicero	35	Chemical engineer	Libertad	Runner-up
Nicolás Rolando	35	Dentist	Sayago	3rd classified
Lourdes Galván	37	Employee	Piedras Blancas	14th eliminated
Martín Méndez	41	Merchant	Libertad	13th eliminated
Sibila Ibarra	24	Architecture student	Durazno	12th eliminated
Amparo Pereira	27	Employee	Prado	11th eliminated
Silvia Pírez	46	Publicist	Malvín	10th eliminated
Ana María Florentín	65	Retired doctor	Canelones	9th eliminated
Víctor Bello	28	Pharmaceutical chemist	Treinta y Tres	8th eliminated
Francisco Boezio	55	Marketing analyst	Paso Carrasco	7th eliminated
Cristina Buroni	52	Interior decorator	Pocitos	6th eliminated
Mercedes Carballo	33	Carpenter	Unión	Abandons
Danilo Britos	40	Craft brewer	Ciudad de la Costa	5th eliminated
María Pía Cardozo	22	Military navy	Rocha	4th eliminated
Manuel Aispuro	38	Butcher	Centro	3rd eliminated
Gonzalo Teixeira	26	Veterinary student	Tacuarembó	2nd eliminated
Chantal Tuttle	43	French teacher	Cordón	1st eliminated

== Spin-off editions ==
=== MasterChef Profesionales: 2018 ===
A spin-off featuring professional chefs as contestants. It ran from August 20, 2018 to November 27, 2018. The judges were Sergio Puglia, Lucía Soria, Laurent Lainé and Narda Lepes.

Season	Episodes	Originally released		Winner	Runner(s)-up	Judges		
Season	Episodes	Premiere date	Finale date	Winner	Runner(s)-up	1	2	3
1	16	August 20, 2018	November 27, 2018	Carlos Tellechea	Carolina Mena	Sergio Puglia	Lucía Soria	Laurent Lainé

=== MasterChef Celebrity ===
Season	Episodes	Originally released		Winner	Runner(s)-up	Judges		
Season	Episodes	Premiere date	Finale date	Winner	Runner(s)-up	1	2	3
1	26	September 1, 2020	November 26, 2020	Aldo Martínez	Álvaro Recoba	Sergio Puglia	Ximena Torres	Laurent Lainé
2	26	August 3, 2021	December 9, 2021	Paula Silva	Juan Andrés Verde	Sergio Puglia	Ximena Torres	Laurent Lainé
3	30	April 19, 2022	November 8, 2022	Eduardo Gianarelli	Eunice Castro	Sergio Puglia	Ximena Torres	Laurent Lainé
4	18	April 11, 2023	August 8, 2023	Horacio Peralta	Tav Lust	Sergio Puglia	Ximena Torres	Laurent Lainé

== Awards and nominations ==
Year	Award	Category	Recipient (s)	Result	Ref.
2018	Iris Award	Best Talent Show	MasterChef Uruguay	Won	
2018	Iris Award	Best TV Revelation	Laurent Lainé	Won	
2018	Iris Award	Golden Iris Award	MasterChef Uruguay	Won	
