= Max Capote =

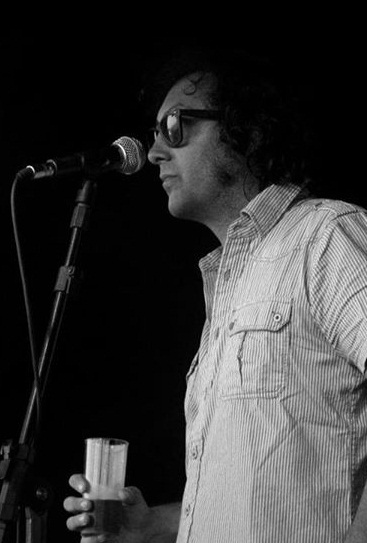
- Max Capote in 2012.

Background information
- Born: Montevideo
- Origin: Uruguay
- Genres: Rock; Motown; Pop; Indie rock
- Occupations: Musician singer-songwriter
- Instrument: Vocals
- Label: Contrapedal
- Website: Max Capote Official Website

Max Capote is a singer-songwriter from Montevideo, Uruguay. He was nominated Latin Grammy Awards of 2011 for Best New Artist. In 2013, Billboard selected him as one of "Ten Latin Artists to Watch in 2013".

== Discography ==
- Grandes Éxitos (2005)
- Chicle (2008)
- Simple en vinilo de 7" Ana – Si Nena (2011)
- Aperitivo de moda (2014)
