= Río Uruguay Televisión =

Río Uruguay Televisión (CXB 24)
Fray Bentos, Rio Negro Department; Uruguay
- Channels: Analog: 12 (VHF); Digital: 28 (UHF); Virtual: 12.1

Programming
- Affiliations: La Red; Canal 4 Teledoce

Ownership
- Owner: Grupo Monte Carlo; (Río Uruguay TV Fray Bentos S.A.)

History
- Founded: 27 January 1966
- First air date: 26 May 1966
- Former call signs: CXB 26 (1966-2000s)

Technical information
- Licensing authority: URSEC

Links
- Website: www.canal12.com.uy

Río Uruguay Televisión, also known as Canal 12, is a Uruguayan free-to-air television station, located in the city of Fray Bentos, founded in 1966. The fifth television station to sign on in Uruguay, it is also the first to launch outside the capital Montevideo.

== History ==
Río Uruguay Televisión was established by María Elvira Salvo Ferreri on 27 January 1966, when the Uruguayan government gave the city of Fray Bentos a television license on channel 12, by order of Resolution nº 38.564 of the Executive Chamber, and started broadcasting on 26 May 1966, from its initial premises at Club Unión Oriental. Its first director was Pedro Boggiani, former technical director of the Uruguay al día and Emelco newsreels. Its first transmitting tower was a 35-meter tall antenna, which was handcrafted. The local news program, which also included national and international news, aired at 9pm, followed by Torre Olímpica at 10pm and later, women's interest programs. Still in 1966, the debate program Octavo Día started, with a single camera and the live participation of panelists. Commercial breaks did not exceed four minutes of length.

At the end of 1966, it increased its transmitting output, and in less than four years, it moved to a new location at a building owned by Dr. Alfredo Descalzi. Pedro Boggiani left the channel in 1977, as he was named the administrative director of the Uruguayan public health system, being replaced by Jorge González.

Other noteworthy programs in its early years included Teleteatro semanal (televised plays featuring local actors, using a single camera, written and directed by Orlando Tocce), Bandera a cuadros en alto (motorsports, with journalist Francisco Severin), Ritmo Visión (music program presented by Imazul Fernández, who came from Montevideo to Fray Bentos to do the program every Saturday) and La escuela en el aire (educational television, with several teachers, which ended with the launch of Red Uruguaya de Televisión).

The station bought its first portable videotaping equipment in 1972 and began producing programs from outside Fray Bentos, in cities that were part of RUTV's coverage area. The local weekly programs for these cities were Mercedes hoy, Young al día and Gualeguaychú inquieto. Ahead of elections in neighboring Argentina, the channel aired Usted debe saber. From Búfalo came the musical variety show Búfalo-Camera-Acción, which had performances from local bands.

Notable special telecasts in its early decades included the performance of Coro de Cantores de la Merced in 1970, from Centro Uruguayo de Mercedes, Automovilismo from the SADAM racetrack in Mercedes, and telethons: Las tres tareas de la Buena Voluntad, for Hogar de Ancianos de Mercedes, in 1972, 12 horas de contínuo, for cardiology support, and from 1992, Telemaratón, beginning in 1992 from Constitución Square and from 1993 in studios, similar to telethons on commercial stations in Montevideo.

The station became the first in Uruguay to conduct color test transmissions in mid-1978, later, implementing color television on a regular basis starting in June 1980, only for an hour a day, from 9 to 10pm. The move put RUTV ahead of Red Uruguaya de Televisión (which started broadcasting on 25 August 1981, already in color) and the Montevideo channels (also converted in 1981).

In January 1997, María Elvira Salvo Ferrari sold the station to Río Uruguay TV Fray Bentos S.A., where she became a shareholder alongside Carlos Lorenzo Romay Eccher. As of 2000, it was one of the six television stations owned by Grupo Monte Carlo. It had negotiated with TVLibre in 2003 in an attempt to carry its programming. The station had converted its equipment to digital technology by 2006.

The station celebrated its fiftieth anniversary on 26 May 2016, with a two-hour special for the occasion. A 2017 investigation by Brecha on Monte Carlo's concentration of media activities put Río Uruguay TV as part of a joint operation between the Romay family and local interests, unlike four inland television stations that are Canal 4 affiliates and are directly managed by the group. The local interests also own Fray Bentos Video Cable (affiliated with Equital) and Río Uruguay TV Cable.

== Technical information ==
The station covers Fray Bentos, Mercedes, Young and Dolores in Uruguay and Gualeguaychú in Argentina. As of 2006, Gualeguaychú was the city with the largest number of households capable of receiving RUTV. Its spillover audience in Argentina was useful when an agricultural debate took place in early June 2006, when media outlets in Argentina were concentrated on their coverage of the 2006 FIFA World Cup, which implied massive pre-emptions.

On October 25, 2013, the government gave the station a license to operate a digital signal on UHF channel 28. It was operational by the time of its fiftieth anniversary in May 2016.

== Programming ==
The channel relays some of Red TV's networked programming, sourced from its two partners Canal 4 and Teledoce, as well as the local morning news service Buen Día Litoral and the main news service Teleregional, with two editions (12:30pm and 7pm). The station doesn't relay Telenoche from Montevideo, but, until its cancellation in 2023, carried the 1:30pm and 10pm editions of Red Informativa. As a member of La Red, it also carries some of Teledoce's programs, such as Poné Play.

In January 2018, it premiered Verano Juntos, which also aired in Paysandú and Artigas, as well as on Antel's Vera TV platform and on Facebook.

== Controversies ==
On 26 January 2002, the station broadcast a movie from 12am, with long commercial breaks, but the movie was cut at around 1:20am for the station to sign off.
