= El Observador (Uruguay) =

Newspaper

- Type: Daily newspaper
- Founded: 22 October 1991; 35 years ago
- Political alignment: Liberalism
- Headquarters: Montevideo, Uruguay
- Website: www.elobservador.com.uy

El Observador is a Uruguayan newspaper, published for the first time on 22 October 1991, and distributed nationwide. Its circulation is verified by the Argentine institution IVC.
