= Luchemos por la vida =

Luchemos por la Vida ("Let's fight for life")
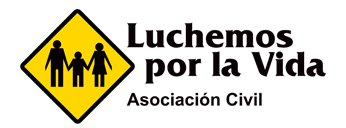
- Founded: 20 June 1990
- Type: Non-governmental organization
- Purpose: Road traffic safety
- Location: Buenos Aires, Argentina
- Region served: Argentina
- Method: Volunteering, free workshops, mass media campaigns, research
- Key people: Alberto Silveira, María Cristina Isoba
- Subsidiaries: None
- Revenue: In-company courses, donations
- Website: www.luchemos.org.ar/en

Luchemos por la Vida (Spanish for "Let's fight for life") is a nonprofit organization whose purpose is to help prevent traffic accidents in Argentina. It promotes road traffic safety and focuses on contributing to safe traffic behavior. the organization does not receive financial support from government agencies and is mainly held together by volunteers, private firms, and community servicemen. In 2010, statistics showed that approximately 21 deaths occurred per day in Argentina (nearly 7,600 over the course of the year) along with 100,000 injured and severe vehicle damage caused by traffic incidents.

== History ==
Luchemos por la Vida was created in Buenos Aires, Argentina on 20 June 1990 by a group of people concerned about the daily loss of lives in Argentine traffic. Their principle stated that "every effort is worth to save a life", but their main goal was ambitious: "No more people die in traffic accidents". As none of the members had specific training on the subject, it was decided to look up national and international information about the problem. Some local institutions related to the road issue in Argentina were contacted apart from embassies to know the situation abroad.

The first task of the organization consisted of spreading concern about traffic accidents in the Argentine population. Since this process required working closely with the community, each member talked to friends and neighbors about the problem, followed by the first brochures and posters that were distributed in shops, schools, churches, and newspapers in the neighborhoods of the city. Since then, Luchemos por la Vida has maintained a continued work that, among other things, helped place the problem of traffic safety in the media agenda and national politics. The authorities of Luchemos por la Vida estimate that many lives have been saved due to the changes that have occurred in road safety in Argentina since 1990. In the year 2018, deaths per day by car had decreased to 20, according to the publishments by this organization.

== Objectives ==
Luchemos por la Vida's main purpose is to prevent traffic accidents to reduce the fatality rates connected to this cause. The organization concentrates its largest efforts on actions to modify the attitudes, behaviors, and habits of those who walk or drive on the streets every day (car drivers, pedestrians, cyclists, etc.) to reduce the number of deaths and injured. Their main courses of action include the following:

- Creating awareness about the risk of traffic accidents among the public.
- Educating people on safety habits (simple safety rules to reduce risks).
- Encouraging the passing of appropriate laws and their enforcement.

== Areas of work ==
Luchemos por la Vida works in four areas to improve traffic education and road safety:

- Mass media: An ongoing campaign for public awareness and education on TV, radio, newspapers, and other activities.
- Institutions: Educational activities in all school levels: pre-school, elementary, and high; intermediate organizations, etc.
- Government: Bills of laws and regulations to be presented to the executive and legislative powers.
- Research: Analysis of local and foreign situations, surveys, statistics, and projects.

== Activities ==
In 1992, Luchemos por la Vida carried out a massive campaign for the prevention of traffic accidents on Argentine radio and television that was broadcast throughout the country and other Latin American nations. Designed to help prevent traffic-related deaths and injuries, it attempted to raise a concern about the problem of traffic accidents, increase the "perception of risk" among users of public roads, and promote safer road behavior. Through the use of several advertising strategies, the organization provided information about safe behavior along with the main causes of accidents and deaths in traffic. The keys to prevention of mortality in traffic are spread every day: use of seat belts and helmets, alcohol and driving, speeding, night driving, and safety of pedestrians, passengers, and bikers among others. With different formats, the advertisements provide messages that are suitable for the population, in general, and also focused groups. Nearly 1,000 Argentine media outlets –among them, open TV channels, cable TV channels, and AM and FM radios from Buenos Aires, all Argentine provinces, and Latin America have contributed to the spread of the campaign, CNN en Español being one of them.

=== Work with newspapers, magazines, TV, and radios ===
The organization has built channels of communication via radio and television channels to guarantee the collaboration of the public in spreading awareness regarding the lack of road safety and its possible solutions. Different kinds of activities are carried out, among them:

- Delivery of periodic reports about research and analysis of current facts to be spread in newspapers, magazines, and TV programs.
- Participation in TV programs, news programs, and talk shows.
- Monitoring commercial spots and complaints to companies that show behaviors that are against road safety as part of the Advertisements for Life campaign.
- Contacting companies that produce fictional or entertaining content for local TV to introduce commentaries or show safe road behavior in characters and programs as part of the Media for Life campaign.

=== Luchemos por la Vida magazine ===
This quarterly publication is distributed freely to all town councils and is designed to promote public interest in traffic safety and the prevention of traffic accidents and to share information on developments and research in other countries.

=== Traffic safety education ===
Since the beginning, the organization has promoted the incorporation of traffic safety education at schools with the help of private firms.

- Schools for Life program: Educational workshops for elementary and high school students. Teams are formed by specially trained teachers from the organization to carry out participative workshops in private and public schools with contents and activities that are suitable for the different ages and environments to which the children belong to. According to the organization, by 2010, approximately more than 600,000 people had received, directly or indirectly, road education.
- Training courses for teachers: Since 1994 the organization has given theoretical and practical courses for teachers from all levels that aim to provide theoretical knowledge of basic concepts of road safety and education, and training in teaching resources to develop these concepts in their daily work.

== Government and public policies ==
The organization petitions the authorities for public policies about road safety and effective actions, and attempts to contribute, clarify, and collaborate with these activities.

=== Proposals for laws and monitoring of their effective enforcement ===
Luchemos por la Vida promoted, through mass media and document mails sent to the national authorities, the sanction of a decree (692/92) and, later, a new National Law of Traffic (24,449), declaring the obligatory use of seat belts and helmets for motorcycle and moped riders, the prohibition of taking children on the front seats of a vehicle, and maximum BAC levels, apart from other regulations. Luchemos por la Vida also follows the proper enforcement of the law so that it is really put into practice through effective controls and sanctions to the transgressors. Luchemos por la Vida is currently promoting the punishment of crimes against traffic safety and its inclusion in Argentine legislation.

=== Members of the Consultative Committee of the National Road Safety Agency ===
The organization is part of the National Road Safety Agency (Agencia Nacional de Seguridad Vial, ANSV) as a member of the Consultative Committee and provides direct advice on several issues, such as campaigns for public awareness, training and traffic education programs, criminal research, production of books, implementation of controls, training for patrols, statistics, etc.

=== Training courses for government employees ===
Every year, conferences and training courses for government employees with executive responsibilities, inspectors, and traffic police are developed in the city of Buenos Aires and different provincial towns to improve their enforcement of the law in the traffic system or as trainers of their forces or community traffic teachers. 18 National Conferences on Safety and Road Education have already been presented in Buenos Aires and more than 700 government employees have been present.

=== Traffic safety courses for license renewals ===
As certain Argentine town councils do not require minimum conditions of suitability for driving when granting licenses, Luchemos por la Vida designed and promoted training programs and theoretical and practical tests in order to achieve responsible granting of driving licenses. In addition, the organization has designed and given courses for new drivers and people that renew their driving licenses in the Directorate of Traffic of the government of the city of Buenos Aires.

== Production of teaching materials ==
The organization has created two free educational videos that aim to improve traffic safety and education.

=== Claves para una conducción segura ("Keys to safe driving") ===
Produced for the training of drivers, it is given without cost to offices that grant driving licenses in Argentina and Latin America.

=== Cazadores de peatones ("Hunters of pedestrians") ===
Its distribution is free to all public and private elementary schools in Argentina. The film promotes the participation of students and encourages their capacity to think about the traffic system and safe pedestrian behavior. A guide for educational activities in the classroom is attached. It can be used to teach ages ten to thirteen-year-old children, as part of the program of studies or extracurricular.

=== Production of books, posters, and brochures ===
Designing and printing posters, brochures, educational manuals, and books concerning road safety and safe driving.

== Research ==
Luchemos por la Vida carries out studies and research about two problems of road safety: statistics of traffic accidents, especially about mortality in Argentina, and research on human behavior in the traffic system: behavior and beliefs, knowledge, attitudes and factors that motivate them, use of seat belts and helmets, the efficiency of law enforcement, and traffic flow.

== The Luchemos por la Vida awards ==
Given for the first time in 1996, the Luchemos por la Vida awards are bestowed on those who make important efforts to promote the prevention of traffic accidents and spread public awareness. The ceremony is held yearly with guests, represents of institutions and private firms, authorities, and media outlets.

== Collaborations with international scientific organizations and publications ==
Luchemos por la Vida takes part in international technical and political scientific organizations such as:

- United Nations: Luchemos por la Vida makes up the list of NGOs that work for road safety, part of the UN and WHO's Collaborators Net on traumatism in traffic.
- Global Road Safety Partnership: members of the organization have been invited to participate as speakers in some of their International Conferences, as well as to take part in the scientific committee for one of its conferences. Moreover, the organization also collaborated in reviewing the Spanish version of the book "Speed Management, a Road Safety Manual for Decision-makers and Practitioners".
- International Traffic Medicine Association: Whose regional vice-president of Latin America, Alberto José Silveira, is the President of Luchemos por la Vida as well.
- Prevention Rutiêre International.

== Training courses for drivers ==
The organization has designed and put into practice safe driving courses for new drivers, drivers seeking to renew their licenses, drivers working in private firms, and professional drivers.

== Support of the Decade of Action for Road Safety 2011-2020 ==
In support of the declaration of the years 2011–2020 as the "Decade of Action for Road Safety" by the United Nations General Assembly, Luchemos por la Vida promotes its own actions and seeks to engage authorities and society regarding four subjects to reduce road fatalities: helmet use, use of safety belt and child restraint systems, avoidance of driving after taking alcohol, and speed control.

== Board of directors ==
- President: Dr. Alberto Silveira
- Director of Road Safety Education and Research: Lic. María Cristina Isoba.
- Secretary: Jorge Sabaté.
- Permanent members: Alicia Balboni de Copello and José Auletta.
