= Channel 7 (Punta del Este, Uruguay) =

Television station in Punta del Este, Maldonado, Uruguay

Canal 7 Punta (CXB7)
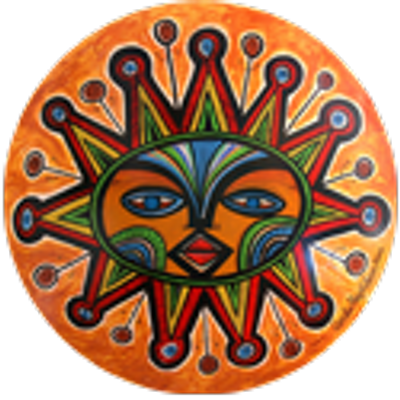

Punta del Este–Maldonado, Maldonado Department; Uruguay
- Channels: Digital: 24 (UHF); Virtual: 7

Programming
- Affiliations: El Trece; Canal 10

Ownership
- Owner: Grupo Clarín Kuarzo Entertainment Argentina; (Telesistemas Uruguayos S.A.)

History
- First air date: 18 January 1968
- Former channel numbers: Analog: 9 (1968–1991); 7 (1991–2020)
- Former affiliations: Teledoce; Telefe

Technical information
- Licensing authority: URSEC

Links
- Website: canal7punta.tv

Channel 7 is a local television station in Punta del Este, Uruguay, owned by Grupo Clarín. The station primarily rebroadcasts programs from co-owned Argentine network El Trece and from domestic broadcaster Canal 10, as well as local programming.

== History ==
The station began broadcasting on 18 January 1968 from Maldonado. It was known as "Canal 9 del Este" and broadcast on channel 9. On 7 July 1991, after 23 years, the station moved to channel 7 in a swap with TeleRocha, which moved to channel 9. The station for years after the swap was known as "Canal 7 Cerro Pan de Azúcar", referring to its transmitter site and high-power facility.
