= Radio Monte Carlo (Uruguay) =

CX 20 Radio Monte Carlo

Montevideo; Uruguay
- Frequency: 930 AM

Programming
- Format: Talk

Ownership
- Owner: Monte Carlo S. A.
- Sister stations: Radio Cero 104.3, Monte Carlo TV

History
- First air date: 24 December 1924

Technical information
- Power: 50 kW

Links
- Webcast: Listen live
- Website: www.radiomontecarlo.com.uy

CX 20 Radio Monte Carlo is a Uruguayan Spanish-language AM radio station that broadcasts from Montevideo and serves the whole country.

Established in 1924 by Carlos Romay, husband of Elvira Salvo, it belongs to a multimedia group that also owns the television channel Canal 4.

== Selected programs ==
- Tempranísimo (variety).
- Informativo 930 (news).
- Aquí está su disco (on-demand music).
- Tangos a media luz (tango music).
- El tren de la noche (night entertainment).
