= La Red (Uruguayan TV channel) =

Uruguayan television network

Red Uruguaya de Televisión Digital
- Country: Uruguay
- Broadcast area: Uruguay (certain departments)
- Headquarters: Montevideo, Uruguay

Programming
- Language: Spanish
- Picture format: 1080i HDTV (downscaled to 576i for the SD feed)

Ownership
- Owner: Red Uruguaya de Televisión S.A.

History
- Launched: August 25, 1981; 44 years ago
- Former names: Red Televisión Color (1981–2001) - Red Uruguaya de Televisión (2001–2018)

Links
- Website: www.redtv.com.uy

Availability

Terrestrial
- Analog VHF: Varies
- Digital VHF: Varies

Red Uruguaya de Televisión Digital (Red TV) is a Uruguayan television network based out of Montevideo that feeds programming from the three commercial television stations of the capital (4, 10, 12) to television stations in the Uruguayan inland. The three stations also share the network's ownership. Some stations affiliated to the network are owned by one of the three groups.

== History ==
On 24 July 1980, during the dictatorship, the Romay (Monte Carlo), Fontaina-De Feo (SAETA) and De Scheck (Teledoce) groups signed a resolution for an inland television network to combat the reception of television stations from Brazil and Argentina, which were easily available in border areas due to spillover.

Red Uruguaya de Televisión Sociedad Anónima (RUTSA) was founded on 25 August 1981, following the growth of television stations outside of Montevideo, which began in 1966 with the establishment of Río Uruguay Televisión in Fray Bentos. From that day, the Montevideo started feeding, using the ANTEL microwave network, six hours of programming a day, from 5pm to 11pm, after pressure from the private channels to establish a television network with national reach. Since the network was controlled by the oligopoly controlled by the families that owned the three Montevideo stations, they obtained total control of private television, becoming present at a national scale.

On 1 June 1982, the network was given two relay stations (channel 9 in Paso de Los Toros and channel 11 in Durazno) to broadcast the 1982 FIFA World Cup temporarily. A new ANTEL resolution on 31 August the same year gave La Red the chance of enabling the two stations to operate precariously.

A second channel Red Televisión Color 2, started in 1999, airing sporting events, especially soccer to subscribers of the satellite service TDH. It shut down around 2000.

Due to a crisis affecting the network in 2016, Grupo Fontaina - De Feo left the ownership structure of La Red, with the network itself being sold to Bernardo Juanicó. De Feo's A+V channel, however, continued to be produced at Rutsa's studios in Montevideo.

At the end of October 2023, La Red announced that it would temporarily cease in-house program production, being limited to relays of programs from Canal 4 and Canal 12. Red Informativa, its news service, was replaced by a program with highlights of news bulletins from its affiliates.

== Branding ==
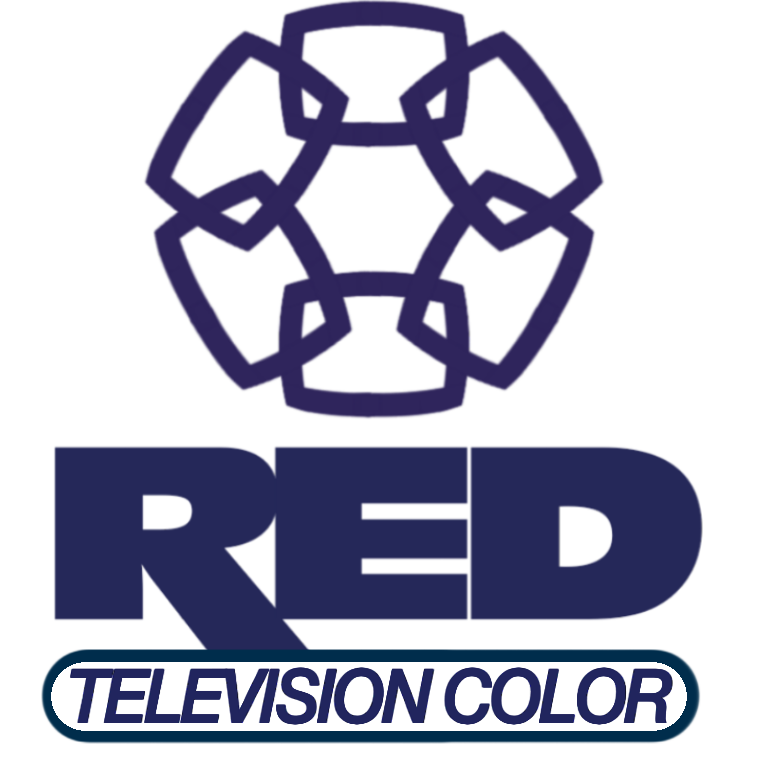
1981–1995

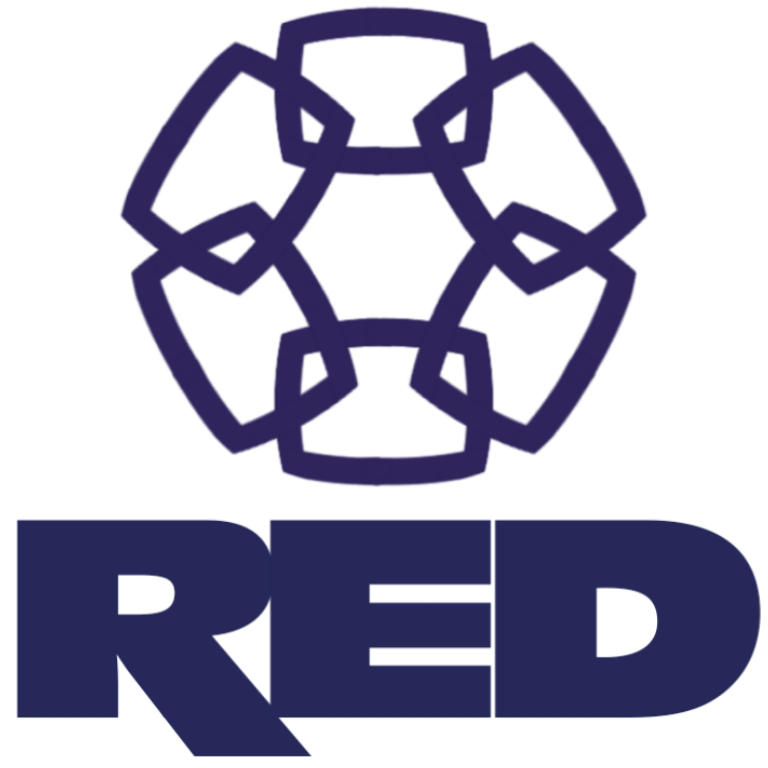
1995–2007

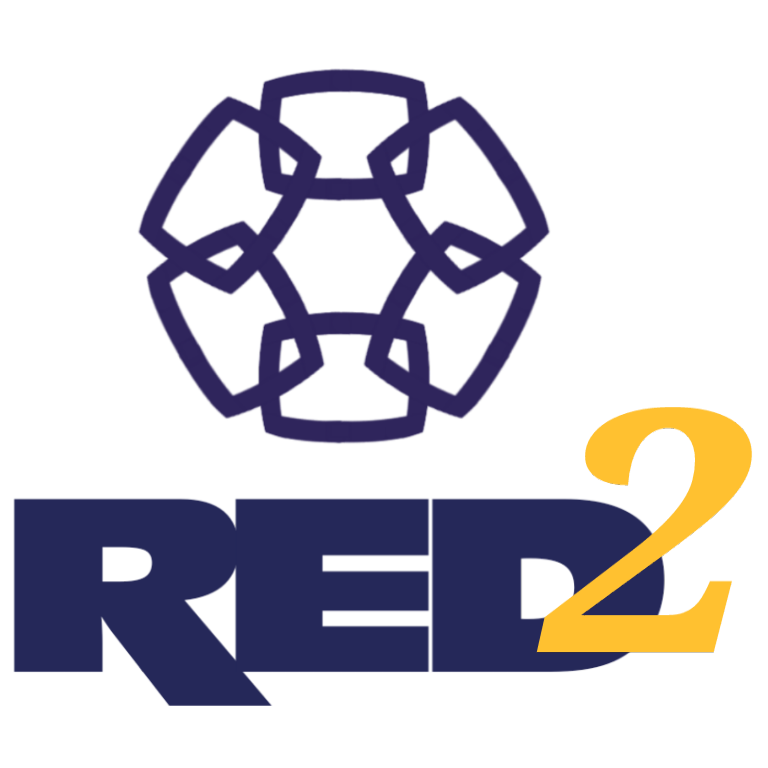
Red Televisión Color 2 (1999–2000)

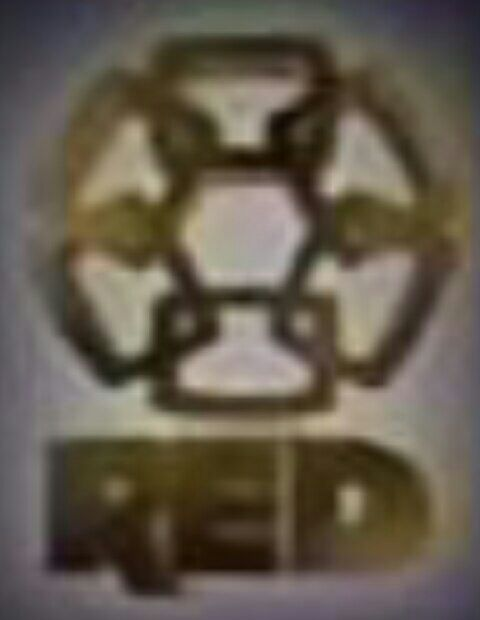
2000–2007

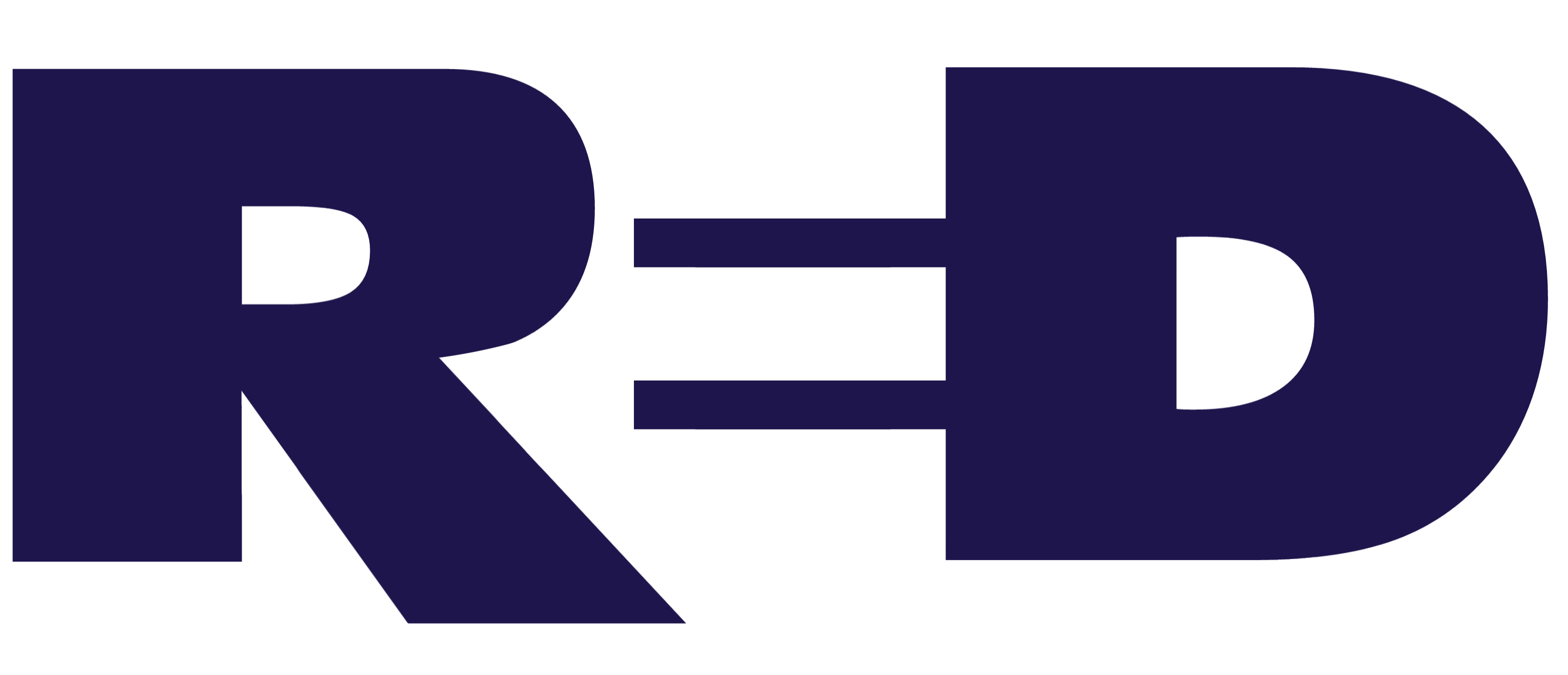
2015–2016

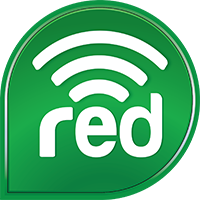
2016–2018

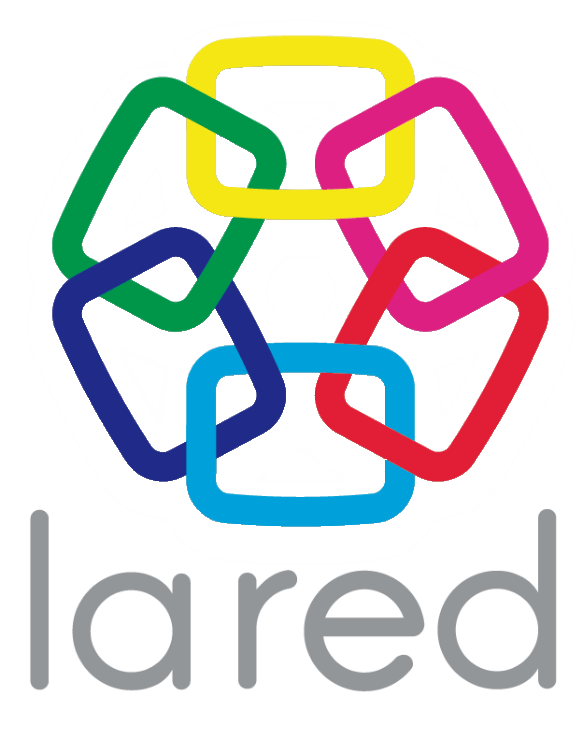
2018–present
