= TCC (Uruguay) =

Uruguayan cable television company

Televisión Cable Color (TCC) is a Uruguayan cable television company owned by the Fontaina - De Feo Group, consequently associated to its over-the-air network Canal 10 and part of Equital, a company operated in equal parts by Montevideo's three commercial stations. It was founded in 1995.

== History ==
In 1995, the Luis Alberto Lacalle government issued tenders for cable TV companies, Sociedad Anónima de Emisión de Televisión y Anexos presented itself with Televisión Cable Color, while Grupo Monte Carlo presented Montecable and Sociedad Televisora Larrañaga Nuevo Siglo, obtaining the license to operate across Montevideo and the metropolitan area, by means of resolution N°117/1994 of the Executive Branch. The company was formed in March 1995.

TCC started its regular commercial operations on November 26, 1995. On December 13 of that year, its first subscriber got connected. At the time, the cable company had 37 channels, later increasing to 44, five of which scrambled, later increasing to 15 by the time Tenfield started broadcasting its premium football service. The coverage area was initially limited to the Tres Cruces neighborhood and the south and north areas of Cordón. In 1999, it expanded to the east zone of Montevideo, Pocitos, Punta Carretas, Carrasco, Prado, Flor de Maroñas, Ituzaingó and Jardines del Hipódromo.

In December 2014, TCC shut down its analog signal after nineteen years; later, in May 2015, it aimed to start an OTT service as well as the AhoraTV schedule app.

In December 2018, TCC launched Teatrix, a platform to watch plays from Argentina, Brazil and Broadway in high definition.

When Equital (company formed by TCC, Nuevo Siglo, Montecable and Multiseñal) removed the Artear channels from its line-ups following a conflict with the company, TCC replaced TN with A24 and Canal (á) with Encuentro.

In December 2021, Juan Casaravilla was appointed its director-general.

== Subsidiaries ==
=== ZetaTV ===
TCC is a majority shareholder in the Uruguayan company ZetaTV, dedicated to the development and insertion of technologies (decoders, apps for TV and smart systems as well as software) for cable television companies in the Southern Cone (Uruguay, Argentina and Chile) where it provides assistance from its central offices in Montevideo.
