= Canal 4 (Uruguayan TV channel) =

Television channel in Uruguay

Canal 4 (CXB-4-TDT)
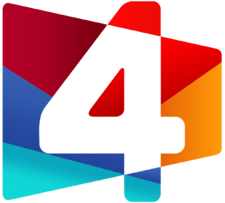
- Logo used since 2019
- Montevideo, Montevideo Department; Uruguay
- Channels: Analog: 4 (VHF); Digital: 29 (UHF)
- Branding: Canal 4

Ownership
- Owner: Grupo Monte Carlo S.A.
- Sister stations: Canal 11 (Maldonado); Canal 3 (Colonia); Canal 8 (Rosario); Canal 4 (Dolores); Canal 12 (Fray Bentos)

History
- First air date: April 23, 1961
- Former names: Monte Carlo Televisión Canal 4 (1961-1965); Canal 4 Monte Carlo TV (1965-1981); Monte Carlo TV Color (1981-2001); Monte Carlo Televisión (2001-2019)
- Former affiliations: Telefe

Technical information
- Licensing authority: URSEC

Links
- Website: www.canal4.com.uy

Canal 4 (Canal Cuatro), previously known as Monte Carlo Televisión, is a television station located in Montevideo, Uruguay. Owned by Grupo Monte Carlo, it is the second oldest television channel in the country, beginning its broadcasts on 23 April 1961. Canal 10 started on 7 December 1956. Canal 12 was the third channel, 2 May 1962, and Canal 5, state-owned, was the last station to start broadcasting, on 19 June 1963.

== History ==
This TV station, originally named Monte Carlo Televisión Canal 4, was initiated by María Elvira Salvo (whose family had built the iconic Palacio Salvo in Montevideo, and widow of Carlos Romay, an entrepreneur who had founded Radio Monte Carlo in 1924), together with her son Hugo. In 1961, from a set that was built in downtown Montevideo, at exactly 9 p.m., Uruguayan viewers had the chance to tune Casino Monte Carlo, a variety show that became the first program to be aired in the new station.

The quick success of television saw Canal 4 expanding its broadcast hours throughout the 1960s, first by starting at 6 p.m., then from 12 noon. The extended schedule prompted the premiere of Telenoticiero Monte Carlo at 1 p.m.; before starting morning broadcasts. In 1964, it made its first broadcast from inland Uruguay in Paysandú during an agricultural fair, and in 1966, it became the first to make a live broadcast of an electoral act.

After almost 5 years of having only one station in the Uruguayan TV market, Canal 4 decided to launch by investing heavily on regional stars and international TV series. In addition, Canal 4 introduced videotape machines in the Uruguayan television industry. Before that, because of the absence of such equipment, all programming was live, including the commercial breaks.

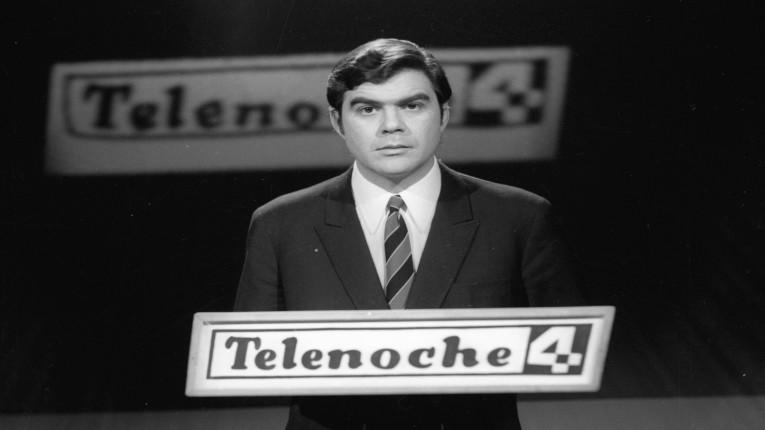
TV anchor Carlos Giacosa hosted Telenoche 4 for the first time in 1968.

On July 20, 1969, the day Neil Armstrong and Buzz Aldrin landed on the Moon during the Apollo 11 mission, Carlos Giacosa, main anchor of Telenoche 4 at that time, surprised everyone by conducting a live interview, by phone, with Wernher von Braun. Giacosa had visited NASA years before, and he had kept a business card with the phone number of his secretary.

Fernando Vilar was the main anchor for TeleNoche 4, the station's signature news show, during 22 uninterrupted years, from 1993 to 2015.

During 2016, Uruguay celebrated 60 years of television in the country, which prompted many newspapers and magazines to feature special articles to highlight the occasion.

In 2017, Canal 4 decided to join the regional trend to feature Turkish television series, a genre that is highly popular in South America, at the 11 p.m. time slot. Telenoche 4 decided to upgrade its sets, graphic packages, and style, while no longer using its main newsroom set, called Centro Monte Carlo de Noticias.

During 2019, while rebranding the station as Canal 4 after almost two decades of using Monte Carlo Televisión, the channel started airing El Diario del Lunes, a weekly show with soccer legends Fernando Álvez and Jorge Seré, which focuses on the Uruguayan League and the national soccer team.

In 2020, Canal 4 launched its international channel, Canal 4 Internacional, available for subscription only, outside of Uruguayan soil, via streaming.

== Current programming ==
=== Original programming ===
- Santa misa (1961–present)
- Telenoche (1968–present)
- En Foco (2005–present)
- Agitando una más (2009–2021)
- Algo contigo (2011–present)
- Santo & Seña (2012–present)
- Todas las voces (2005–present)
- De la tierra al plato (2017–present)
- Bien con Lourdes (2018–present)
- Vespertinas (2018–2021)
- Vamo arriba (2018–present)
- De película (2018–present)
- El diario del lunes (2019–present)
- Reenviado (2019–present)
- Buen vivir (2020–present)
- Zoom Internacional (2020–present)
- Únicos (2020–present)
- Los ocho escalones (2021–present)
- Zoom de noticias (2021–present)
- Cena con mamá (2021–present)
- Bake Off Uruguay (2021–present)

=== Acquired programming ===
==== Drama ====
- The Good Doctor (2017) (as Un médico brillante) (2020–present)
- Dudaktan Kalbe (2007) (as De los labios al corazón) (2020–present)
- Güllerin Savaşı (2020) (as Guerra de Rosas) (2021–present)
- Ufak Tefek Cinayetler (2017) (as Traición Secreta) (2021–present)

== Logos ==
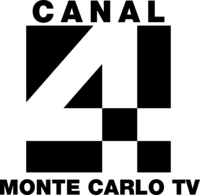
1969–73

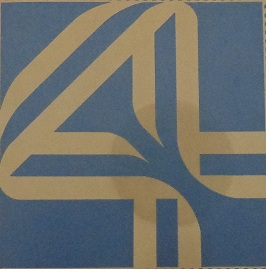
1978–80
