= Got Talent Uruguay season 1 =

Season of television series

Got Talent Uruguay
- Season 1
- Hosted by: Natalia Oreiro
- Judges: Orlando Petinatti; María Noel Riccetto; Claudia Fernández; Agustín Casanova
- Winner: Diego Coronel

Release
- Original network: Channel 10
- Original release: 22 June – 7 December 2020

The first season of Got Talent Uruguay, an Uruguayan talent show competition, was broadcast in Uruguay during 2020, from June 22 to December 7 on Channel 10. The judging panel was formed by Orlando Petinatti, María Noel Riccetto, Claudia Fernández and Agustín Casanova. Alongside the main programme, the first series was accompanied by a spin-off sister programme on the same station, titled Amamos el Talento, hosted by Noelia Etcheverry and Kairo Herrera.

The first series was won by opera singer Diego Coronel.

== Season Overview ==
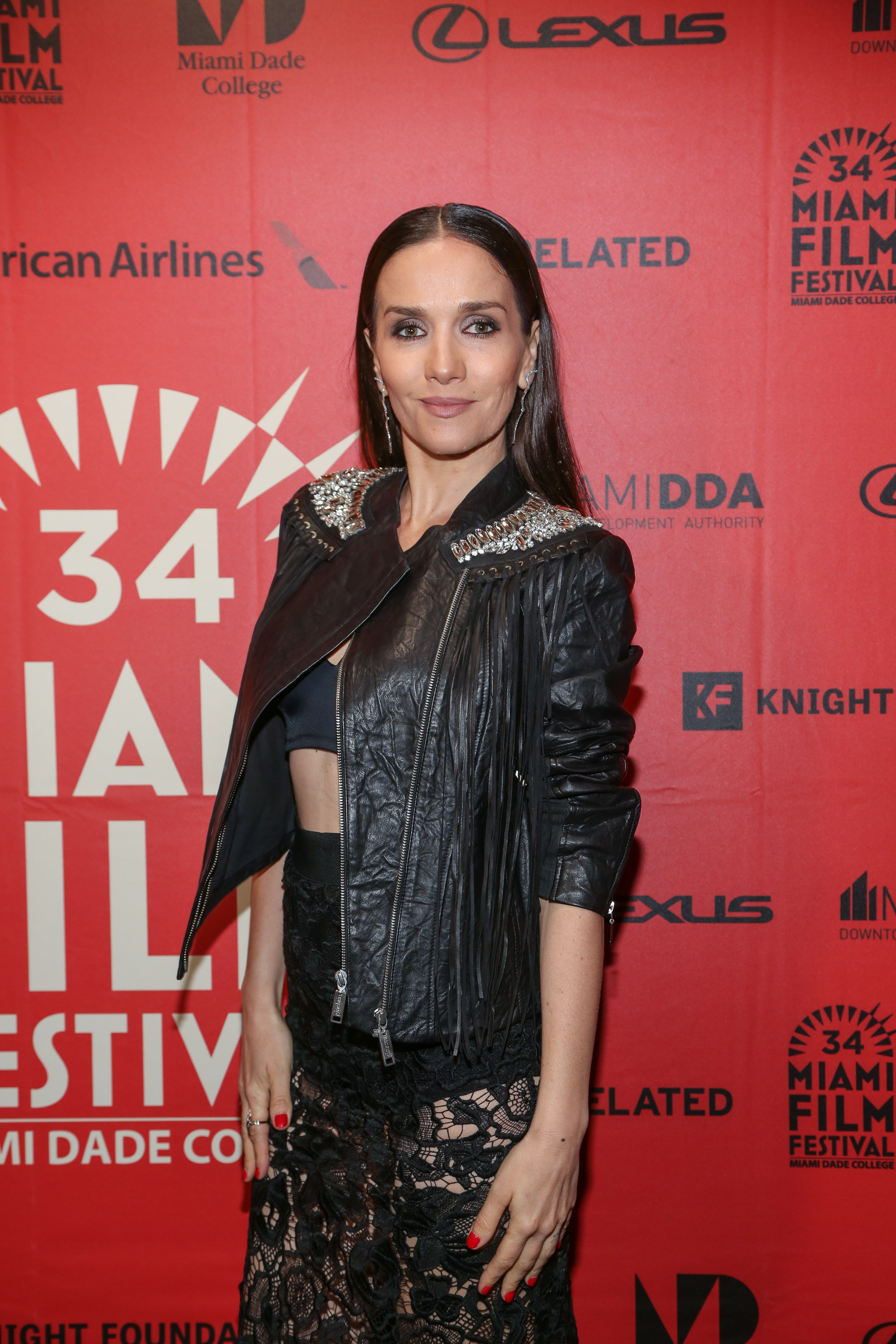
Got Talent Uruguay was the first local production presented by Natalia Oreiro.

The idea to produce an Uruguayan adaptation of the international franchise, created by Simon Cowell emerged in March 2019. On July 30 of that year, it was confirmed that actress Natalia Oreiro. From November to December 2019, the production team toured the 19 departments of the country to make the casts, as a whole, they called more than 10,000 people, becoming the version with the most aspirants.

Filming of the auditions began in February 2020, which were held in important theaters in the country: Spanish Theater (Durazno), Politeama Theater (Canelones), Florencio Sánchez Theater (Paysandú), Convention Center (Punta del Este) and El Galpón Theater (Montevideo). The filming of the second stage began on August 12, 2020, at the Nelly Goitiño Auditorium in Montevideo, which did not have an audience because of the sanitary restrictions due to the COVID-19 pandemic. With the same restrictions, the semi-finals took place at that venue, while the final was held at the Antel Arena.

=== Semi-final summary ===
Buzzed out | Judges' vote | Advanced - Public Vote
Advanced - Judges' Vote | Eliminated

=== Semi-final 1 (26 October) ===
Semi-Finalist	Order	Buzzes and Judges' Vote				Result
Semi-Finalist	Order	Petinatti	María	Claudia	Agustín	Result
Agustina Espina	1					Eliminated
Coti Danz	2					Advanced (Won Public vote)
Bastian Oton	3					Eliminated
Devorah Izquierdo	4					Eliminated
Gymdance	5					Eliminated
Luis & Anto	6					Eliminated
Diego Coronel	7					Advanced (Won Judges' vote)
Los Botones	8					Eliminated

=== Semi-final 2 (2 November) ===
Semi-Finalist	Order	Buzzes and Judges' Vote				Result
Semi-Finalist	Order	Petinatti	María	Claudia	Agustín	Result
Maximiliano Medina	1					Eliminated
Latinas Ballroom	2					Eliminated
Analía Xavier	3					Advanced (Won Public vote)
Evangelina Rodríguez	4					Advanced (Won Judges' vote)
Ayelén Caviglia	5					Eliminated
Tierra Adentro	6					Eliminated
Manuel Acosta	7					Eliminated
Estelita Brasil	8					Eliminated

=== Semi-final 3 (9 November) ===
Semi-Finalist	Order	Buzzes and Judges' Vote				Result
Semi-Finalist	Order	Petinatti	María	Claudia	Agustín	Result
Tamara Touriño	1					Eliminated
Ballet Folklórico Aborigen	2					Eliminated
Ricardo Díaz	3					Eliminated
Tito Cabral	4					Eliminated
Glamazon	5					Advanced (Won Judges' vote)
Lucía Aramburu	6					Eliminated
Emanuel Olivera	7					Advanced (Won Public vote)
Meknic Boys	8					Eliminated

=== Semi-final 4 (16 November) ===
Semi-Finalist	Order	Buzzes and Judges' Vote				Result
Semi-Finalist	Order	Petinatti	María	Claudia	Agustín	Result
Compás 15	1					Eliminated
Piero & Horacio	2					Advanced (Won Public vote)
Chiara Scanzerra	3					Advanced (Won Judges' vote)
Lautaro Leal	4					Eliminated
Scoobit Crew	5					Eliminated
Washington Duarte	6					Eliminated
Lucía Rico	7					Eliminated
Maty & Pato	8					Eliminated

=== Semi-final 5 (23 November) ===
Semi-Finalist	Order	Buzzes and Judges' Vote				Result
Semi-Finalist	Order	Petinatti	María	Claudia	Agustín	Result
Luciana García	1					Eliminated
Dúo Fa-Ra	2					Advanced (Won Public vote)
Juliana Vairo	3					Advanced (Won Judges' vote)
Las Cavallini	4					Eliminated
Dúo Kairos	5					Eliminated
Dúo Hikmah	6					Eliminated
Felipe Abelenda	7					Eliminated
Gumigams	8					Eliminated

=== Semi-final 6 (30 November) ===
Semi-Finalist	Order	Buzzes and Judges' Vote				Result
Semi-Finalist	Order	Petinatti	María	Claudia	Agustín	Result
Mauro Damisa	1					Eliminated
Agus & Nico	2					Eliminated
Paul David Turman	3					Eliminated
Manuel Argimón	4					Eliminated
The Leds Group	5					Advanced (Won Judges' vote)
Álvaro Sánchez	6					Eliminated
Aldana Argüelles	7					Advanced (Won Public vote)
Compañía de Tango Julio Sosa	8					Eliminated
Mariana Borhz	9					Eliminated

=== Final (7 December) ===
Semi-Finalist	Order	Result
Emanuel Olivera	1	Finalist
Analía Xavier	2	Finalist
Chiara Scanzerra	3	Finalist
Dúo Fa-Ra	4	Finalist
Diego Coronel	5	Winner
Piero y Horacio	6	Finalist
The Leds Group	7	Finalist
Juliana Vairo	8	Finalist
Evangelina Rodríguez	9	Finalist
Aldana Argüelles	10	Finalist
Coti Danz	11	Finalist
Glamazon	12	Finalist
