= Buen Día (Uruguayan TV program) =

Uruguayan morning television show

- Genre: Morning news and talk
- Presented by: Jaime Clara
- Country of origin: Uruguay
- Original language: Spanish

Production
- Production locations: Channel 4 Headquarters, Montevideo
- Running time: 120 minutes

Original release
- Network: Channel 4
- Release: March 20, 2020 – July 14, 2023

Buen Día (Spanish: Good Morning) was an Uruguayan morning television show aired on Channel 4 from March 23, 2020 to July 14, 2023. It was the successor of Buen Día Uruguay aired from 1998 to 2020.

== History ==
"Buen Día" debuted on Monday, March 23, 2020, exactly three days after the ending of its predecessor. It aired from Monday to Friday at 8 a.m, having 120 minutes on the air per program, with commercial breaks.

In March 2022 Jaime Clara replaced Claudia García as host of the program. In April 2023, after Clara joined Telenoche 4, journalist Marcelo Irachet replaced him. In July the network announced that Buen día would be taken off the air. On July 14, after three years on the air, the last episode aired, and on Monday the 17th, 8AM premiered.

== On-air staff ==
- Jaime Clara (Host; 2022–2023).
- Marcelo Irachet (Host; 2023).
- Daniel Nogueira (Panelist; 2020–2023).
- Jimena Sabaris (Panelist; 2020–2023).
- Martín Fablet (Panelist; 2020–2023).
- Diana Piñeyro (Panelist; 2022–2023).
- Daro Kneubuhler (Panelist; 2020–2022; 2023).

=== Former on-air staff ===
- Magdalena Prado (Panelist; 2020–2021).
- Claudia García (Anchor; 2020–2021).
