= Punta de Rieles =

Punta de Rieles may refer to:

- Punta de Rieles - Bella Italia, a neighbourhood of Montevideo, Uruguay
- a former name of Villa Ángela, a city in the province of Chaco, Argentina
