= Jimena Sabaris =

Uruguayan actress and television presenter (born 1989)

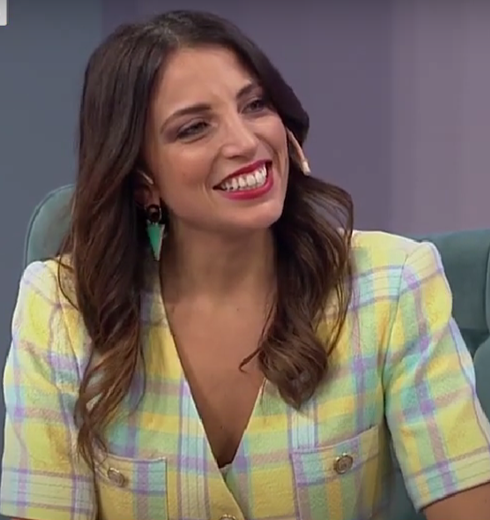
- Sabaris in 2022
- Born: Jimena Sabaris Montes; October 26, 1989 (age 36); Montevideo, Uruguay
- Occupations: Television presenter; actress
- Television: Buen Día; Bake Off Uruguay
- Partner: Eduardo Sasson (2022–present)
- Children: 2

Jimena Sabaris Montes (born 26 October 1989) is a Uruguayan television presenter and actress. She began working in the media as a reporter on the morning show Buen Día Uruguay, later becoming one of its presenters. She subsequently continued her career in morning television before presenting the reality competition Bake Off Uruguay (2022–2025).

== Early life ==
Jimena Sabaris Montes was born on October 26, 1989, in Montevideo, but from the age of seven to fourteen she lived in Minas, Lavalleja Department. At the age of 16, she was chosen by a modeling agency to carry out advertising campaigns. She began her acting training at the Luis Trochón School of Musical Comedy and at the Espacio Teatro Academy in Montevideo.

She lived in Buenos Aires for two years, where she worked as a children's entertainer and had appearances in theater.

== Career ==
In 2011, she played Vicky in the Uruguayan telenovela Dance! La Fuerza del Corazón. A year later, she had a small appearance in the Argentine telenovela Dulce amor, playing the character of Delfi. In 2015 she was part, along with Belén Bianco and Federico Goyeneche, Tocama, a cumbia pop band. The band's debut single, "Hay que celebrar" obtained 40,000 views in three days.

Until 2016, Sabaris worked on the Pop TV signal, and in 2017 she joined the morning program Buen día Uruguay to lead the segment specialized in animal welfare, entitled "Mascoteros". She was also in charge of the program's reports in Punta del Este, during the 2018 summer season. From 2018 to 2019 she was part of Todas las voces, as the presenter of the program's poll and the one in charge of interaction with viewers.

In 2020, after the departure of Soledad Ortega from Buen día Uruguay, Sabaris served as co-host with Leo Lorenzo and Christian Font, until the show went off the air on March 20. Since then, she has been a member of the panel of the morning program Buen Día, hosted by Claudia García. On April 12 of that year, she began hosting Zoom International on Channel 4, a variety show about world news, together with Santiago Wilkins.

In February 2022, Sabaris joined Bake Off Uruguay as its new host, succeeding Annasofía Facello. She presented the show for three seasons, including its celebrity edition. In July 2023, following the end of Buen Día, she continued as a co-host on 8AM, its successor. After a decade working on Channel 4's morning programming, she announced her departure from 8AM in June 2026 to focus on raising her children.

== Filmography ==
Year	Title	Role	Notes
2011	Dance! La Fuerza del Corazón	Vicky	Supporting role
2012	Dulce amor	Delfi	Supporting role
2017–2020	Buen día Uruguay	Herself	Reporter
2020	Buen día Uruguay	Herself	Co-host
2018–19	Todas las voces	Herself	Columnist
2020–2023	Buen Día	Herself	Panelist
2020–present	Zoom Internacional	Herself	Host
2022–2025	Bake Off Uruguay	Herself	Host
2023–2026	8AM	Herself	Co-host

== Personal life ==
Sabaris has been in a relationship with the lawyer Eduardo Sasson since 2022. On April 17, 2023, she announced that she was pregnant with her first child, who would be called Lorenzo. On September 22, 2023, Sabaris gave birth to their son. On October 8, 2025, the couple announced via Instagram that they were expecting their second child together. They announced the birth of their son Augusto on April 5, 2026.
