= Jaime Clara =

Uruguayan writer and journalist (born 1965)

- Born: Aníbal Jaime Clara Caputi; 5 March 1965 (age 61); San José de Mayo, Uruguay
- Education: Catholic University of Uruguay
- Occupations: Journalist, newsreader, television presenter, writer
- Employer: Channel 4

Aníbal Jaime Clara Caputi (born 5 March 1965) is an Uruguayan journalist, television presenter, writer and newsreader. He is the anchor of the Telenoche newscast of Channel 4 since 2023.

== Early life and education ==
Aníbal Jaime Clara Caputi was born on 5 March 1965 in San José de Mayo, the capital city of the San José Department, to Aníbal Clara, a school teacher and his wife, also a school teacher. He has two sisters: Isabel and Mercedes, a writer who was seen as a potential running mate for Daniel Martinez for the 2019 general election. He attended Primary School No. 45, where he was president of the institute's Red Cross.

He attended the Institute of Philosophy, Sciences and Letters, which would later be the Catholic University of Uruguay, to study journalism; he graduated with a Licentiate in Social Communication.

== Career ==
He ventured into radio at the age of eight, when he won an award at CW 41 Broadcasting station in San José de Mayo and began helping answer phone calls. In 1975, at the age of ten, he made his debut on the air with the program Casos, cosas de todo un poco, and five years later, when he was already a radio operator, he premiered the Sunday program Panorama, el programa distinto de la Radio San José, which was on the air almost three years.

When he left the radio in his hometown to move to Montevideo to study journalism, he was hired by the Federated Agrarian Cooperatives to take care of the communication area. He worked there during 10 years, and then was employed by the Press Office of the Ministry of Livestock, Agriculture and Fisheries. In 1996 he was summoned by Sarandí 690 to serve as producer of the program En vivo y en directo and in 2001 he began to present the cultural program Sábado Sarandí, one of the most listened to on the station. On April 5, 2004, he premiered the radio program Al pan pan, as co-host with Sergio Puglia.

In May 2021 it was announced that Clara would leave the Al pan pan, being replaced by Ana María Mizrahi. In March 2022, he replaced Claudia García as host of the morning show Buen Día produced by Channel 4. On November 9, 2022, it was announced that Clara would replace Daniel Castro as news anchor on Channel 4's Telenoche newscast. He began reading the news with Viviana Ruggiero and Emilio Izaguirre on January 16, 2023, in a renewal of the newscast.

== Bibliography ==
- Sin pecado un adorno (1999)
- En campaña, una mirada sobre propaganda y marketing político (2009)
- Es inmensa la noche (2011)
- La terrible presión de la nada (2015)
- Otra forma de silencio (2018)
- No todo está dicho, cultura y política en caricaturas (2020)
- En la larga noche (2021)

== Personal life ==
Clara is married to the Spanish resident in Uruguay Alva Sueiras. Both run Delicatessen.uy, a blog dedicated to gastronomy, culture and travel.
