= Got Talent Uruguay =

- Created by: Simon Cowell
- Presented by: Natalia Oreiro
- Judges: Orlando Petinatti; María Noel Riccetto; Claudia Fernández; Agustín Casanova; Elvis Crespo
- Country of origin: Uruguay
- No. of seasons: 3
- No. of episodes: +25

Production
- Production locations: Canelones; Durazno; Montevideo; Paysandú; Punta del Este
- Running time: 180 minutes

Original release
- Network: Canal 10
- Release: 22 June 2020 – present

Got Talent Uruguay is a Uruguayan reality television series, and part of the global Got Talent franchise created by Simon Cowell. Presented by Natalia Oreiro, it is produced by Fremantle along Syco Entertainment, and broadcast on Channel 10. The show debuted on June 22, 2020, being, its first episode, the most watched program of the day, reaching 17.7 rating points. It airs every Monday at 9 p.m.

The program is a talent show that features singers, dancers, sketch artists, comedians and other performers of all ages competing for the top prize of UYU 1,000,000 (approximately USD 23,000).

On June 15, 2020, the derivative program, Amamos el Talento debuted. Presented by Annasofía Facello and Noelia Etcheverry, Got Talent's release date was announced, a promo and a sneak peek of the first episode were shown. The show unveils all the details of the show, as well as interviews and behind the scenes. From the third episode of this derivative program, Annasofía Facello leaves the hosting, being replaced by Kairo Herrera.

== Format ==
=== Auditions ===
The first performances - auditions - take place on the stage of a theater throughout several programs, in which the participants show their talent in various disciplines, such as dance, singing, humor, acrobatics, among others. Each member of the jury decides if the participant deserves to continue with her demonstration; for this, he has a red button on the table that serves to stop the performance in case he doesn't want to continue listening or watching the show; if all four press the button, the performance is automatically stopped, at the same time that a red cross lights up and the contestant is eliminated.

=== Judges' decisions ===
In the second stage, the participants who got three or four positive votes from the judges in the previous round are presented again to get to the semifinals. At this stage, the contestants receive the return after the performance, however, and unlike the auditions, the announcement of those who manage to move on to the next round of the show is given after a deliberation by the judges.

== Judges and presenters ==
Series	Main Judge				Presenter
Series	1	2	3	4	Presenter
1	Orlando Petinatti	María Noel Riccetto	Claudia Fernández	Agustín Casanova	Natalia Oreiro
2	Orlando Petinatti	María Noel Riccetto	Claudia Fernández	Agustín Casanova	Natalia Oreiro
3	Orlando Petinatti	María Noel Riccetto	Claudia Fernández	Agustín Casanova	Natalia Oreiro
4	Orlando Petinatti	María Noel Riccetto	Claudia Fernández	Agustín Casanova	Natalia Oreiro

== Series overview ==
Series	Start	Finish	Winner's prize ^{1}	Winner	Runner-up
1	22 June 2020	7 December 2020	UYU 1,000,000	Diego Coronel (26-year-old opera singer)	N/A
2	12 April 2021	20 September 2021	UYU 1,000,000	Enzo Castro (7-year-old accordionist)	N/A
3	8 August 2022	28 November 2022	UYU 1,000,000	Camila Iza Machado (15-year-old singer)	N/A
4	TBA	TBA	UYU 1,000,000	TBA	N/A

== Production ==
The idea to produce a Uruguayan adaptation of the international franchise, created by Simon Cowell emerged in March 2019. On July 30 of that year, it was confirmed that actress Natalia Oreiro would be the presenter of the program, being her first time to host a local television show. In the first days of August, the names of three of the members of the jury were revealed. They were the ballet dancer and former soloist of the American Ballet Theatre, María Noel Riccetto; radio host and producer Orlando Petinatti; and the presenter, actress Claudia Fernández. Finally, on September 1, the actor and singer, ex-vocalist of Márama, Agustín Casanova confirmed his participation.

From November to December 2019, the production team toured the 19 departments of the country to make the casts, as a whole, they called more than 10,000 people, becoming the version with the most aspirants. Filming of the auditions began in February 2020, which were held in important theaters in the country: Spanish Theater (Durazno), Politeama Theater (Canelones), Florencio Sánchez Theater (Paysandú), Convention Center (Punta del Este) and El Galpón Theater (Montevideo).

The filming of the second stage began on August 12, 2020 at the Nelly Goitiño Auditorium in Montevideo, which did not have an audience because of the sanitary restrictions due to the COVID-19 pandemic. With the same restrictions, the semi-finals took place at that venue, while the final was held at the Antel Arena.

On September 14, the renewal for a second season was announced, scheduled for 2021. Season 2 premiered on April 12, 2021, and unlike the previous one, it was filmed only at the El Galpón Theater in Montevideo. The final was held on September 20, at the National Auditorium.
