= José Bayardi =

Uruguayan physician and politician

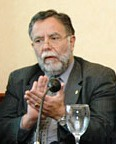
José Bayardi

José Bayardi (born 30 June 1955 in Montevideo) is a Uruguayan physician and politician belonging to the Broad Front.

He has served both as Defence and Labor minister during the presidencies of Tabaré Vázquez and José Mujica.

In 2020 he takes part in the talk show Todas las voces.
