= Todas las voces =

- Genre: Debate show
- Presented by: Viviana Ruggiero
- Country of origin: Uruguay
- Original language: Spanish
- No. of seasons: 8
- No. of episodes: +334

Production
- Production locations: Channel 4 Headquarters, Montevideo
- Running time: 75 minutes
- Production company: Channel 4

Original release
- Network: Channel 4
- Release: March 14, 2017 – present

Todas las voces (Spanish for 'All Voices') is a Uruguayan talk show and political discussion television program. Currently in its 8th season, the show has aired on Channel 4 as part of the network's prime time programming block since March 14, 2017.

== Format ==
Every episode features a panel discussion that focus on news and politics. The program seeks to encourage the diversity of opinions that may exist on the same topic. In addition, the audience can interact with the program by sending messages or voting in an opinion poll conducted through Twitter.

== On-air staff ==
- Viviana Ruggiero (Panelist; 2018–2019; Presenter; 2020–present)

=== Former on-air staff ===
- Rodolfo M. Fattoruso (Panelist; 2024)
- Raúl Castro (Panelist; 2024)
- Tomás Friedmann (Panelist; 2024)
- Daniel Castro (Presenter; 2017–2022)
- Laura Raffo (Panelist; 2021–2022)
- Eduardo Brenta (Panelist; 2021–2022)
- Fernando Santullo (Panelist; 2021–2022)
- Francisco Faig (Panelist; 2021–2022)
- Adolfo Garcé (Panelist; 2020)
- José Bayardi (Panelist; 2020)
- Conrado Hughes (Panelist; 2017–2020)
- Gabriel Mazzarovich (Panelist; 2019)
- Mónica Bottero (Panelist; 2017–2018)
- Óscar Andrade (Panelist; 2017–2018)
- Roberto Hernández (Panelist; 2017)
- Alejandra Labraga (Panelist; 2017)
- Jimena Sabaris (Opinion Poll; 2017)

== Episodes ==
Season	Episodes	Originally aired		Broadcast	Rfs.
Season	Episodes	First aired	Last aired	Broadcast	Rfs.
1	80	March 14, 2017	December 21, 2017	Tuesday and Thursday at 11:00p.m	
2	70	April 3, 2018	November 29, 2018	Tuesday and Thursday at 11:00p.m	
3	32	May 7, 2019	December 17, 2019	Tuesday at 10:30 p.m	
4	44	March 2, 2020	December 14, 2020	Monday at 10:00 p.m.	
5	42	March 1, 2021	December 20, 2021	Monday at 9:00 p.m.	
6	31	March 28, 2022	November 14, 2023	Monday at 9:00 p.m.	
7	35	April 12, 2024	December 13, 2024	Friday at 9:30 p.m.	
8	34	April 11, 2025	December 12, 2025	Friday at 9:30 p.m.	

== Awards and nominations ==
Date	Ceremony	Category	Recipient(s)	Status	Rfs.
2018	Iris Awards	Best TV Journalism	Todas las voces	Won	
2018	Iris Awards	Best TV Revelation	Conrado Hughes	Nominated	
2018	Iris Awards	Best TV Revelation	Óscar Andrade	Nominated	
