= National Ballet of Uruguay =

General information
- Name: National Ballet of Uruguay
- Year founded: 27 August 1935
- Principal venue: National Auditorium of Sodre, Montevideo
- Website: https://www.bns.gub.uy/en/

Artistic staff
- Artistic Director: María Noel Riccetto

The National Ballet of Uruguay is a Uruguayan ballet company that was founded in 1935 in Montevideo. It is the public body in charge of developing the professional classical ballet in Uruguay, it is under the administration of the Official Service of Broadcasting, Television and Entertainment (SODRE).

== History ==
=== 1935–2009 ===
The Sodre Dance Corps was founded on August 27, 1935 and has been the public artistic body in charge of developing professional classical ballet in Uruguay. A national company was created that would include in its repertoire not only the vast spectrum of ballet, but also that would incorporate references and promote creations in the area of contemporary and modern dance. For this, the government decided to take over the classical dance company, placing it under the supervision of the Official Service of Broadcasting, Television and Entertainment and falling its first artistic direction on the Master Alberto Pouyanne, who managed to stage his first show on 23 November 1935, offering the premiere of the Nocturno Nativo with music by Vicente Ascone and choreography by Alberto Pouyanne, with the performance of the Sodre Symphony Orchestra under the direction of Lamberto Baldi.

The beginnings of this body were modest and Pouyanne provided the initial boost with students from her academy. Montevideo, during the first half of the 20th century, was the undisputed stopover of all the great figures and companies that came to the continent from the major dance production centers: Europe, the Soviet Union and the United States.

In its first decades the first members of the cast were Olga Banegas, Flor de María Rodríguez, Margaret Graham, Tola Leff, Hebe Arnoux, Lía Dell´Ara, Sunny Lorinczy, Alfredo Corvino, Miguel Therekov, Raúl Severo, Micha Dimitrievich, Eduardo Ramírez, Marina Korolkov, Olga Bérgolo, and Sara Nieto.

=== 2009–present ===
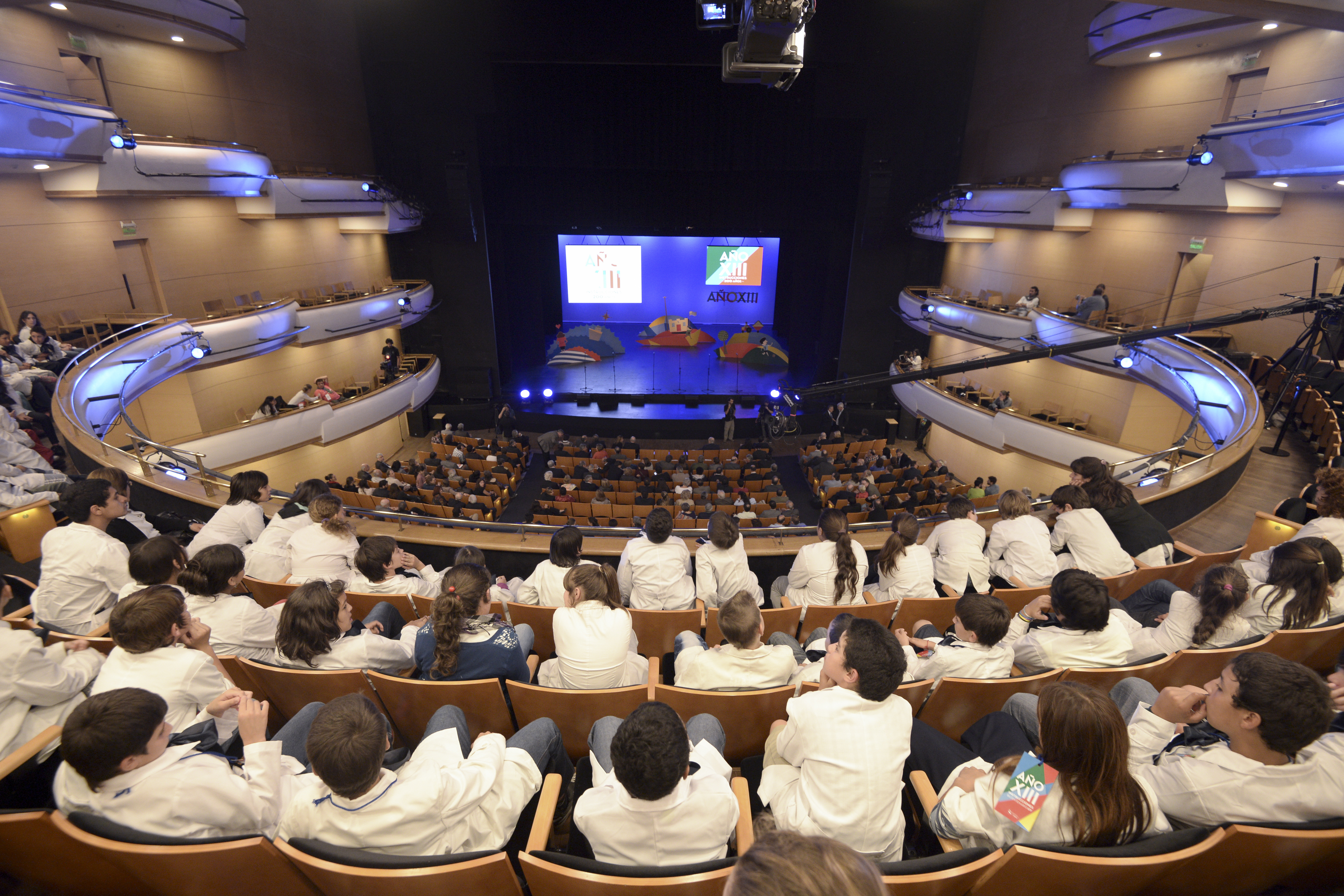
National Auditorium, home of the National Ballet since 2009.

Since 2009 the company, after residing in different rehearsal spaces (Nelly Goitiño Auditorium, Palacio Salvo), finally moved permanently to the National Auditorium of Sodre Adela Reta. That year, Alejandro Godoy together with Rossana Borghetti were appointed directors of the SODRE Ballet performing as "El Amor Brujo" together with the Sodre Symphony Orchestra, with Alejandro Parente as First Dancer. The dancer and teacher graduated from the National Ballet, Alejandro Godoy was incorporated as a male repertoire teacher dedicated to the training of professional dancers and from 2010 to 2012 he served as director of that institution.

In June 2010, Julio Bocca took over as the new artistic director of the company, now called the Sodre National Ballet, this process underwent the greatest transformation in its entire history. A new team takes over the management and the company is re-founded, opening a new stage. Since then, more than thirty plays have been premiered in the National Auditorium, many of them in full version, of the great classical ballets such as: Giselle, Swan Lake, La Bayadère, Le Corsaire, La Sylphide, The Nutcracker, La Viuda Alegre, Don Quixote, Coppélia, Romeo and Juliet and The Sleeping Beauty, among others.

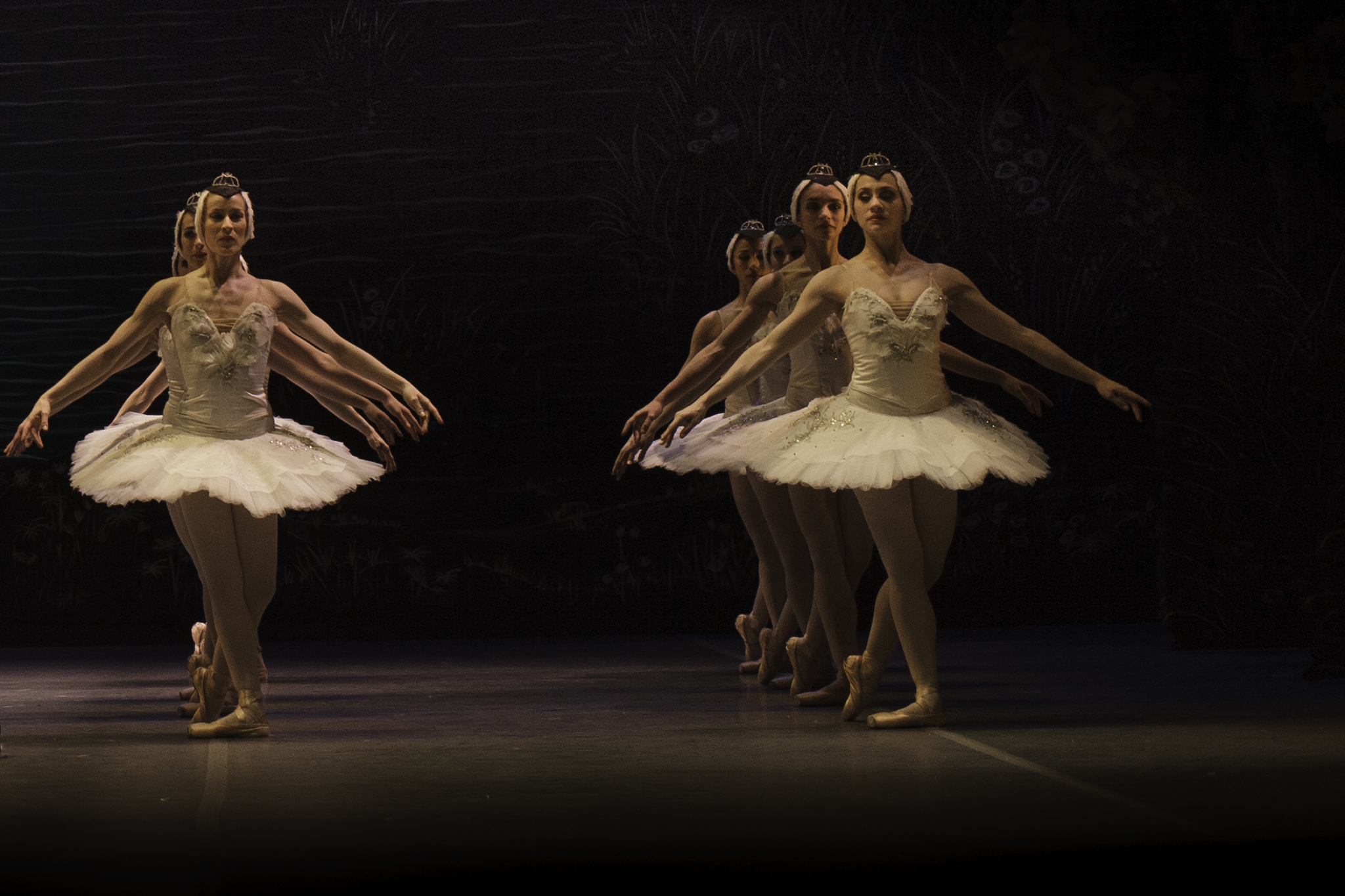
Swan Lake in 2013

The company has made specific presentations, in addition to national and international tours: having presentations in Spain, Italy, Oman, China, Thailand, Russia, Israel, Mexico, Cuba, Venezuela, Colombia, Peru, Chile, Paraguay, Argentina and Brazil.

In February 2018, Igor Yebra took over as the new artistic director of the National Ballet, succeeding Julio Bocca. His first premiere was The Sleeping Beauty, a play that broke the historical record for spectators and ticket sales. In early June 2020, it was confirmed that it would be Yebra's last year as head of the National Ballet. The President of SODRE, Martín Inthamoussú reported that the contract, which expired on December 31, would not be renewed, he stated "There is no particular reason for him. It has nothing to do with his management. They are organizational decisions, the minister [Pablo da Silveira, Minister of Education and Culture] is doing a restructuring". On March 18, 2021, when the company inaugurated the new season, María Noel Riccetto took over as artistic director.
