= Bake Off Uruguay =

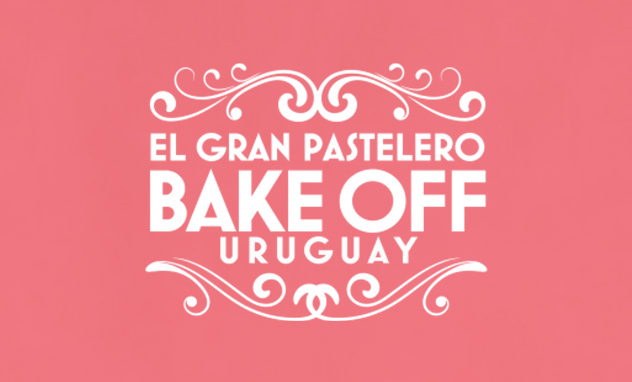
- Also known as: Bake Off Uruguay: El gran pastelero
- Genre: Baking, cooking
- Presented by: Annasofía Facello; Jimena Sabaris
- Judges: Sofía Muñoz; Hugo Soca; Rose Galfione; Stephanie Rauhut; Jean Paul Bondoux
- Country of origin: Uruguay
- Original language: Spanish
- No. of seasons: 3

Production
- Production locations: Jacksonville, Montevideo
- Production company: Metrópolis Films

Original release
- Network: Channel 4
- Release: 26 August 2021

Bake Off Uruguay: El gran pastelero (English: Bake Off Uruguay: The Great Baker) is a Uruguayan reality television broadcast on Channel 4 and produced by Metrópolis Films based on the British television baking competition The Great British Bake Off. Premiered on August 26, 2021, the show follows a group of amateur bakers to compete against each other in a series of rounds, attempting to impress a group of judges with their baking skills.

== Production ==
The Uruguayan version of the talent show was announced in May 2021, while the host and judges, in June. Online registrations were made between the months of May and June of the same year, and the face-to-face auditions were attended by about 2,000 people, of which only 14 were chosen for the first season of the contest. The program is filmed in a large tent, located in Jacksonville, Montevideo.

In early February 2022 it was reported that Jean Paul Bondoux would not return for the second season, he stated that "he was fired". On the 16th, chef and presenter Hugo Soca was announced as his replacement. On the 17th, Facello announced that she would not host the second season in order to "dedicate herself" to other projects. A day later, the production of the program announced that Jimena Sabaris would replace her.

On February 24, Stephanie Rauhut announced that she would also not be returning as a judge in order to "spend time with her family"; she was replaced by chef and author Rose Galfione.

== Cast ==
Name	Notes	Season		
Name	Notes	1	2	3
Presenters				
Annasofía Facello	Actress and television presenter			
Jimena Sabaris	Actress, singer and television presenter			
Judges				
Stephanie Rauhut	Gastronomic entrepreneur and manager the online pastry boutique Süss Pastelería.			
Jean Paul Bondoux	French chef based in Uruguay since 1979 and founder of La Bourgogne restaurant.			
Sofía Muñoz	Graduated from the Gato Dumas Institute and manager of Pecana restaurant.			
Hugo Soca	Le Cordon Bleu graduate chef, restaurateur and television presenter.			
Rose Galfione	Chef sommelier and author.			

== First season (2021) ==
=== Contestants ===
Name	Age	Occupation	Hometown	Status	Place
Facundo Amestoy	31	Entrepreneur	Colonia del Sacramento	Winner	1st
Verónica Osorio	29	Police officer	Minas	Runner-up	2nd
Antonio Deubaldo	40	Speech therapist	Minas	Third place	3rd
Camila Piccolo	35	Actress and economics student	Montevideo	Fourth place	4th
Jimena Pereda	38	Endocrinologist and teacher	Montevideo	Eliminated 2nd/13th	5th
Micaela Briozzo	21	Electrical engineering student	Ciudad de la Costa	Eliminated 12th	6th
Ofelia Placeres	51	Dairy worker	San José	Voluntary withdrawal	7th
Juan Pablo Rocha	30	Dancer and construction worker	Montevideo	Eliminated 1st/10th	8th
Marcos Mettetieri	31	Doctor	San José	Eliminated 9th	9th
Guillermo Chocho	29	Hotelier and accounting student	Montevideo	Eliminated 5th/8th	10th
Yenifer Franco	23	TikToker	Montevideo	Eliminated 7th	11th
Graciela Kosenko	65	Retired	Atlántida	Eliminated 6th	12th
Natalie Nannariello	43	Graphic designer	Montevideo	Eliminated 4th	13th
Silvia Paiva	42	Nurse	Rivera	Eliminated 3d	14th
