= Dance! La Fuerza del Corazón =

Uruguayan television series

- Genre: Youth; Musical
- Created by: Bill Borden; Barry Rosenbush
- Written by: Patricia Maldonado
- Directed by: Martín Mariani; Gustavo Cotta
- Starring: Isabel Macedo; Juan Gil Navarro; Eva De Dominici; Mónica Galán; Maximiliano Ghione; Cristina Alberó; Mirella Pascual; Justina Bustos; Pablo Robles
- Opening theme: La fuerza del corazón by the series cast
- Country of origin: Uruguay
- Original language: Spanish
- No. of seasons: 1
- No. of episodes: 80

Production
- Producer: Pablo Ferreiro
- Production locations: Montevideo, Uruguay
- Running time: 60 minutes
- Production companies: PowWow Media; SAETA TV Canal 10

Original release
- Network: Canal 10
- Release: August 22 – December 9, 2011

Dance! La Fuerza del Corazón, shortly titled as Dance!, is a Uruguayan telenovela that premiered on Channel 10 on August 22, 2011, and aired Monday through Friday until its conclusion on December 9, 2011. The series was created by Bill Borden and Barry Rosenbush, creators of the worldwide franchise High School Musical and produced by PowWow Media.

The show revolves around several intertwined stories of love and drama that take place in a dance academy in Montevideo. It stars an ensemble cast that includes actors such as Isabel Macedo, Eva De Domici, Juan Gil Navarro and Mirella Pascual.

== Plot ==
Dance! Tells the story of four women from three different generations. First is Grandma Estela Redondo (Mónica Galán), a great retired dancer and owner of her own dance academy. Then, Laura "Pekas" Redondo (Isabel Macedo), Estela's daughter, a female fighter, and a recognized choreographer with two ex-husbands: Ricardo Gutiérrez (Juan Gil Navarro) and Jimmy Pereyra (Maximiliano Ghione). Finally, Miranda (Justina Bustos), daughter of Laura and Ricardo, talented singer and dancer, and Gala (Eva De Dominici), daughter of Laura and Jimmy, a sure girl who always achieves what He wants and demonstrates his passion for dancing. The story begins when the Redondo prepares for the auditions of the Estela dance academy. Laura would be a jury, and the two girls would audition, as would many more boys to be part of the academy. Gala and Miranda audition and are chosen because of their great talent and different dance styles, Miranda dances classical, and Gala dances modern. When Gala goes to the academy, she meets a boy who climbed to the fence of the same. This boy is Ramiro (Gonzalo de Cuadro), a talented dancer who had never had the opportunity to show his talent because from a very young age his parents abandoned him and had to be part of a group of orphaned boy gatherers called "Los Desechos", led by Violeta (Chachi Telesco). Gala offers Ramiro a scholarship at her grandmother's academy and from that moment they become best friends. Renata (Thelma Fardin), who is also a member of "Los Desechos", does not like it at all, since Ramiro had been her best friend all her life and everything had changed with Gala's arrival in their lives. At first Renata judges Gala but after meeting her she realizes she is a great girl and they become great friends. In the academy, everything is revolutionized by the news that the work of Broadway "Hacia adelante" would be carried out with the direction of Estela, and that the dancers who would be part of this venture would be the students of the academy. From that news begin the auditions for the work. Miranda's group, formed by her friends Ciro (Pablo Arias), Lucía (Julia Middleton) and Clara (Giselle Motta). It remains in the play after the second audition. The same happens with the Gala group, formed by Ramiro (Gonzalo de Cuadro), Vicky (Jimena Sabaris), Federico (Diego Viquez), Martu (Julieta Bartolomé), Matías (Ezequiel Rojo) and Lucas (Gabriel Segredo). From the first moment they begin to see couples in Dance!. During the first chapters, Laura maintains a relationship with Manuel (Francisco Andrade), a student of the academy who is also quite younger than her, but then leaves because he does not feel comfortable being in a relationship with a boy who is almost the age of their daughters. On the other hand, Miranda is bridal with Javier (Rodrigo Raffeto), a boy who works as his father's right hand in the game. Gala, on a visit to his dad's bar, intersects with Nacho (Augusto Schuster) and falls in love with him immediately. Jimmy asks Nacho to infiltrate the academy and take care of his daughter at times when he cannot. Nacho accepts but eventually he falls in love with Gala. This is a problem for him because falling in love with her would be like letting Jimmy down, so he invents Gala that he cannot be with her because he is gay and his partner is Lucas. After a while Nacho and Lucas end this lie by saying that they had "separated." On the other hand, Renata, who was dating Federico, decides to leave because Federico was embarrassed to introduce Renata to her family. When he leaves, Renata begins to approach Lucas, and Federico Martu, which he uses as a screen so that his parents do not suspect that he is in love with Renata. In the end, Fede and Renata return because they realize they cannot be separated and Fede faces his parents. Gala tries to forget Nacho with the arrival of Teo (Francisco Donavan) in his life, a boy who has just lost his mother and his plans are to approach Gala to reach Jimmy for some reason that we do not know. Teo is closer to Miranda than Gala since with Miranda they share the greatest passion of their lives: music. This does not like either Gala or Javier, since they suspect that between them there is something more than a friendship, although Miranda denies it even to herself. Estela discovers that she has a disease that if not treated in time could be terminal. She decides to hide it from everyone, but despite this Gabe (Mirella Pascual) finds out, her best friend of a lifetime, who lives in the house of the Redondo. Gabe agrees to keep the secret and pretend that she is sick. In turn, try to convince Estela to operate. Finally she succeeds and the two travel to Chicago to perform the operation.

== Broadcasts ==
The series was notable and other stations rebroadcast the series mainly during 2012 including stations in Chile, Nicaragua, Bolivia, Portugal and on Rai 2 Italian television.

| Country | Start date | TV station | Title |
|---|---|---|---|
| Uruguay | 22 August 2011 | Canal 10 | Dance!, la Fuerza del Corazón |
| Italy | 24 September 2012 | Rai 2 | Dance! la forza della passione |
| Chile | 18 June 2012 | Vía X | Dance!, la Fuerza del Corazón |
| Nicaragua | 10 September 2012 | Canal 4 | Dance!, la Fuerza del Corazón |
| Bolivia | 28 May 2012 | ATB | Dance!, la Fuerza del Corazón |
| Portugal | 1 December 2012 | SIC | Dance, a Força do Coração |

== Cast ==
- Isabel Macedo as Laura "Pekas" Redondo
- Juan Gil Navarro as Ricardo Gutiérrez
- Eva De Dominici as Gala Redondo
- Augusto Schuster as Nacho
- Pablo Arias as Ciro
- Mónica Galán as Estela Redondo
- Maximiliano Ghione as Jimmy Pereyra
- Justina Bustos as Miranda Redondo
- Cristina Alberó as Sandra
- Mirella Pascual as Gabe
- Pablo Robles as Mickey
- Thelma Fardin as Renata
- Brian Evans as Emiliano
- Francisco Donavan as Teo
- Gonzalo Decuadro as Ramiro
- Chachi Telesco as Violetta
- Jimena Sabaris as Vicky
- Julieta Bartolomé as Martu
- Ezequiel Rojo as Matías
- Gabriel Segredo as Lucas
- Julia Middleton as Lucía
- Giselle Motta as Clara
- Diego Viquez as Federico
- Francisco Andrade as Manuel
- Luis Pazos as León
- Rodrigo Raffeto as Javier Pandolfo

== Awards and nominations ==
The series was nominated for Best Fiction Series during the Uruguayan Iris Awards.
