= Claudia Fernández =

Uruguayan model, actress and television personality

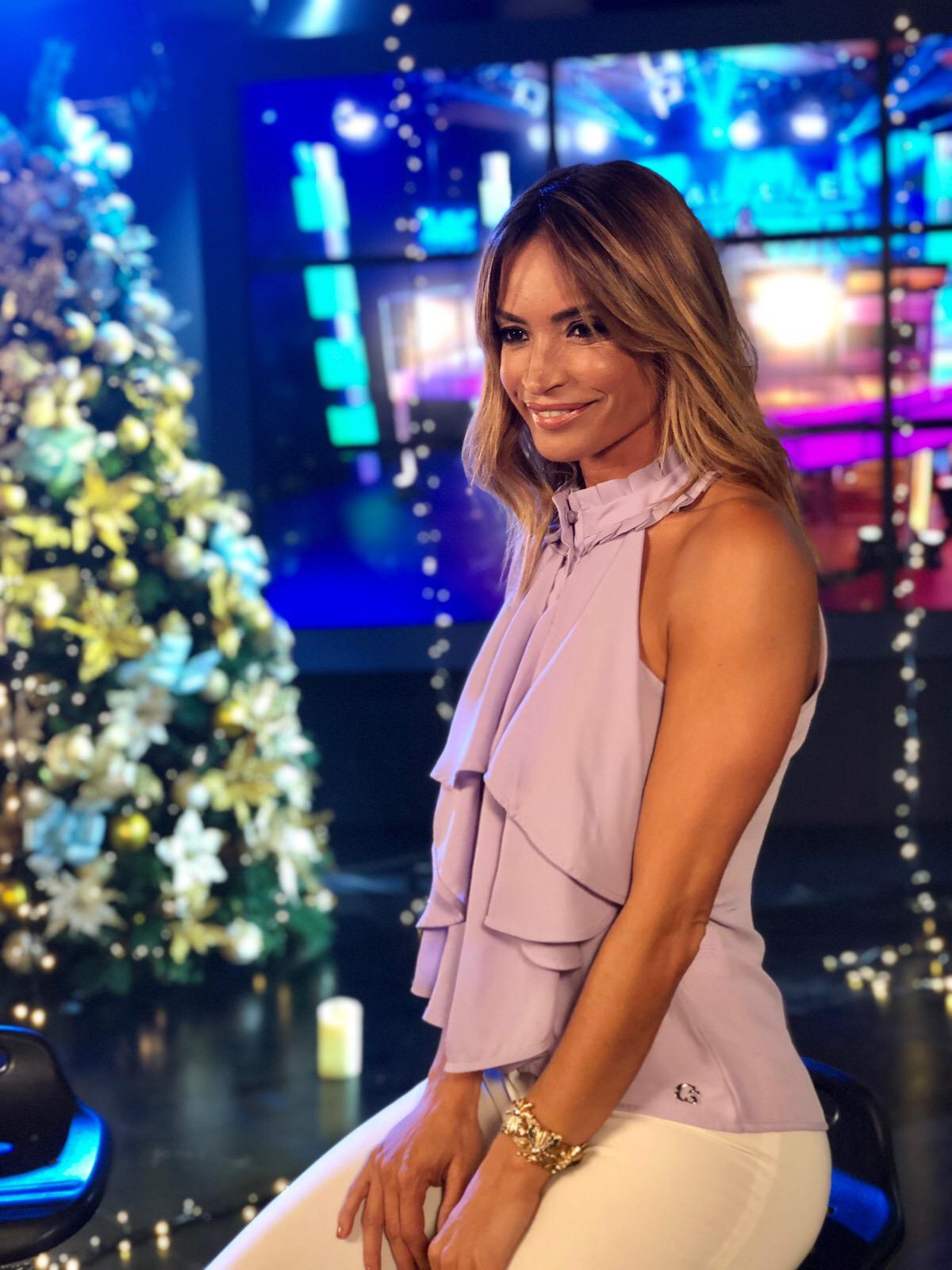
- Claudia Fernández in 2019.
- Born: Claudia Fabiana Fernández Viera; June 22, 1976 (age 50); Montevideo, Uruguay
- Occupations: Television presenter; fashion model; businesswoman; actress
- Television: Bailando por un Sueño 2007; Escape Perfecto - Famosos; Bendita TV; Got Talent Uruguay
- Spouse: Leonel Delménico (m. 2009)
- Children: 2

Claudia Fabiana Fernández Viera (born 22 June 1976) is a Uruguayan award-winning television presenter, fashion model, actress and businesswoman. Born in Punta de Rieles – Bella Italia, Montevideo she began her career as a model in her teens and participated in numerous advertising campaigns. In the late 1990s, she began working on television, on the show Dale que Podés. She also participated in the reality show Bailando por un Sueño, and in the talk show Animales Sueltos, both in Argentina.

== Early and personal life ==
Claudia Fabiana Fernández Viera was born in barrio Punta de Rieles – Bella Italia, Montevideo in 1976. She was raised by her father Fernando Fernández, and her paternal-grandparents, Irma and Juan Antonio Fernández. She has four siblings: Mariana, Fernando, Adriana and Karina. Fernández attended Colegio Sagrado Corazón De Jesús - Liceo Vedruna.

Fernández is a Roman Catholic. She married Argentine businessman Leonel Delménico on 24 April 2009, in Buenos Aires and on 5 June 2009, in Montevideo. On the 6 November of the same year Fernández gave birth to her first child named, Mía Elena. On 8 December 2013, she had a second baby, a boy called Renzo.

== Modeling career ==
Her beginnings in the world of fashion began when she was 15 years old and a photographer discovered her arm walking with her grandmother, Irma by Avenida 18 de Julio next to the cinema of Censa. She began working as the model for María Raquel Bonifaccino & Carlos Cámara, soon after her figure started to appear on Channel 4(Uruguay). She also ranks among the books of the model agency of Diego Ríos.

Fernández has modeled for Caras in Argentina, Playboy in Argentina and Uruguay and Gente in Uruguay, among others.

== Theatrical career ==
- 2009-2010: Fortuna - (Lead Actress and Vedette) Alongside Ricardo Fort, Claudia Ciardone and Virginia Gallardo.
- 2010-2011: El gran show - (Second Vedette)
- 2010-2011: Furtuna 2 - (Lead Actress and Vedette)
- 2011: La Magia del Tupilán - (Actress) - (Uruguay)
- 2011-2012: Gemelas - (Lead Actress) - (Uruguay) Alongside Gladys Florimonte.
- 2011-2012: Que Gauchita es mi Mucama - (Lead Actress) Teatro Astros (Buenos Aires)
- 2012: La Magia de Claudia - (Montevideo)
- 2012–present: Cirugía para Dos - (Supporting Actress) - (Villa Carlos Paz)

== Television career ==
In 2005 she starred in the reality show Cambio de Vida (es), the Uruguayan version of The Simple Life, where she and Tammara Benasús played bratty city girls trying to survive in rural surroundings.

In 2007 Fernández entered in the fourth season of ShowMatch with Maximiliano D'Iorio as a replacement for the Argentine actress, vedette and comedian, Iliana Calabró in the re-entry round. She was eliminated in the 22nd round. She participated in the fifth season of Bailando por un Sueño with Julian Carvajal as a replacement for the Argentine vedette and model, Eliana Guercio in the re-entry round. She was eliminated in the 26th round, having danced only 2 rounds.

In February 2017, she replaced Diego González as host of Escape Perfecto - Edición Famosos; The show co-hosted by Annasofía Facello and broadcast on Channel 10 ended on 17 June 2020. During the second half of 2019, she presented ¿Qué haría tu hijo?, the local adaptation of the British program What Would Your Kid Do?. In September 2019, it was announced that Fernández would be part of Got Talent Uruguay as a member of the panel of judges, along with Orlando Petinatti, María Noel Ricceto and Agustín Casanova. The first season of the show premiered on June 22, 2020 and was renewed for a second and third season, airing for the last time in November 2022.

In 2024, Fernández competed on and won the fourth season of ¿Quién es la máscara? as "Sapa". In December 2024, she was confirmed as a judge for the upcoming Teledoce's show Tu cara me suena.

== Filmography ==
Year	Title	Role	Notes
1998	Dale que podés	Herself	
2001–2003	Dale con Todo	Herself	Assistant
2005	Mochileros	Herself	Co-host
2005	Cambio de vida (es)	Herself	
2007	Bailando por un Sueño	Herself	Participant; 20th Eliminated
2007	Patinando por un Sueño	Herself	Participant; 6th Eliminated
2007	Patito Feo	Samantha Torino	
2008–2017	Bendita TV	Herself	Co-host
2011	Jungla mágica	Herself	Co-host
2011–2012	Animales sueltos	Herself	Panelist
2011–2012	Porque te quiero así	Malena Celaya	Recurring character
2012–2013	La pelu	Herself	Recurring character
2012	La magia de Claudia	Herself	Host
2013	Más cerca con Claudia	Herself	Host
2017–2020	Escape perfecto - Edición Famosos	Herself	Host
2019	¿Qué haría tu hijo?	Herself	Host
2020–2022	Got Talent Uruguay	Herself	Judge
2024	¿Quién es la máscara?	Herself/Sapa	Season 4 winner
2025	Tu cara me suena	Herself	Judge
2026	Moria	Herself	Cameo
