= Buen Día Uruguay =

- Genre: Morning news and talk
- Presented by: Christian Font; Leonardo Lorenzo
- Country of origin: Uruguay
- Original language: Spanish
- No. of seasons: 20

Production
- Production locations: Channel 4 Headquarters, Montevideo
- Running time: 150 minutes
- Production company: Channel 4

Original release
- Network: Channel 4
- Release: 1998 – March 20, 2020

Related
- Muy Buenos Días; Buen Día

Buen día Uruguay (BDU) (Spanish: Good Morning Uruguay) was an Uruguayan morning television show that was broadcast on Channel 4. The program aired Monday through Friday from 8:00 a.m. to 10:30 am. It was presented by Christian Font and Leonardo Lorenzo.

== History ==
=== 1998–2012 ===
The show was launched in 1998 as a successor of the program "Muy buenos días". In the first stage, it had 3856 episodes, for 14 seasons and it was presented by Verónica Peinado, Leonardo Lorenzo, Adriana Da Silva and Sara Perrone. In 2002, Verónica Peinado decides to move away from the program, and Adriana Da Silva succeeds her, a few months later a third conductor, Sara Perrone, who since 1996 was the fashion columnist in "Muy buenos días". In 2012, due to the low audience the show was canceled. The last episode aired on December 28, 2012.

=== 2013–2020 ===
On April 9, 2013, the show was broadcast again. It was broadcast from 8:30 a.m. at 11:00 am. The scenography was renewed and Soledad Ortega, Federico Paz and Christian Font joined the staff. As of May 2018, the program ends at 11:00 am. And in December of the same year, Vamo Arriba was released, presented by Andy Vila, Gastón González and Federico Paz, who retired from "Buen Día Uruguay". He was replaced by Leonardo Lorenzo. In January 2020, Soledad Ortega leaves the show, looking for new projects. In March of the same year, it was announced that Buen Día Uruguay was to cease broadcasting and was to be replaced by Buen Día, presented by Claudia García. Finally, on March 20, 2020, the show aired for the last time.

== On-air staff ==
- Leonardo Lorenzo (Co-Anchor; 1998–2012, 2018–2020)
- Christian Font (Co-Anchor; 2013–2020)
- Jimena Sabaris (Reporter; 2018–2020)
- Soledad Ortega (Co-Anchor; 2013–2020)
- Verónica Peinado (Co-Anchor; 1998–2002)
- Adriana Da Silva (Co-Anchor; 2002–2012)
- Sara Perrone (Reporter; 2002–2012)
- Federico Paz (Co-Anchor; 2013–2018)
- Sofía Rodríguez (Fashion columnist; 2013–2016)

== Accolades ==
In 2015 Buen Día Uruguay won the Iris Award for the best magazine show and in 2016 Soledad Ortega won for best Female TV presenter.
