= Viviana Ruggiero =

Uruguayan journalist and radio broadcaster

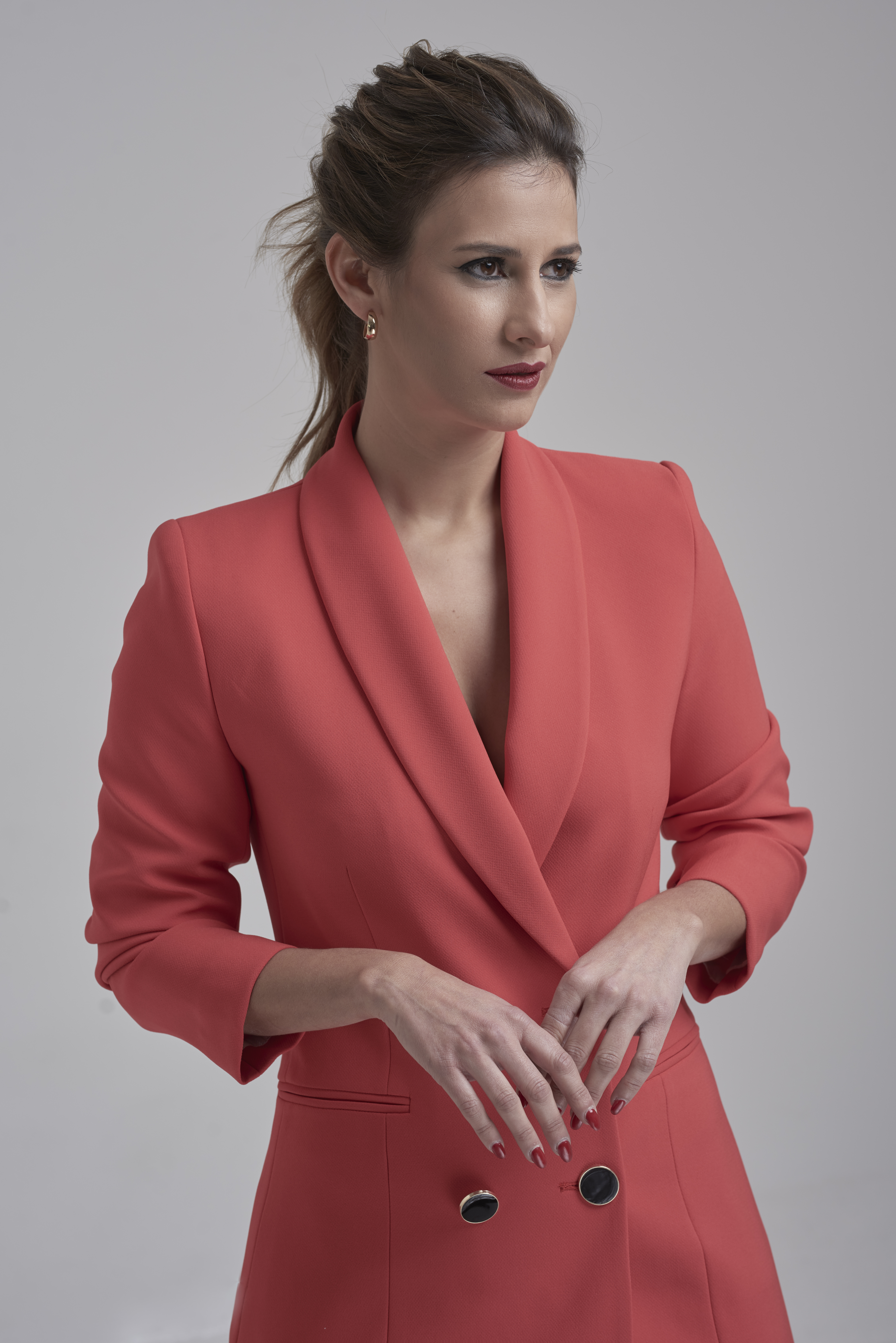
- Born: Viviana Ruggiero González; December 14, 1985 (age 39); Montevideo, Uruguay
- Education: Catholic University of Uruguay
- Occupation(s): Journalist, radio broadcaster, television presenter
- Years active: 2007–present
- Television: Todas las voces Telenoche

Viviana Ruggiero González (born December 14, 1985) is a Uruguayan journalist, radio broadcaster and television presenter. She is currently a co-anchor of Telenoche, Channel 4's news programme, and the presenter of Todas las voces.

== Biography ==
Ruggiero has a degree in Social Communication from the Catholic University of Uruguay. She started her career in 2007, on the website of the Teledoce television channel, but her career as a journalist was consolidated in El País.

She is the presenter of the radio show "Así nos va", broadcast by Radio Carve (AM850), together with Patricia Madrid. He is also a journalist on Telenoche, on Channel 4.

In 2017, Patricia Madrid and Ruggiero published Sendic: The career of the prodigal son, a research book about former Vice President Raúl Sendic, who had to resign from his position on September 13, 2017. The book was focused on his management at the head of ANCAP.

In 2019, she won the Iris Award for the radio journalism program, for "Así nos va".
