= Telenoche (Uruguayan TV program) =

Uruguayan television news program

- Created by: Carlos Giacosa
- Presented by: Jaime Clara; Viviana Ruggiero; Emilio Izaguirre
- Country of origin: Uruguay
- Original language: Spanish

Production
- Production locations: Channel 4 Headquarters, Montevideo
- Running time: 120 minutes

Original release
- Network: Channel 4
- Release: April 29, 1968

Telenoche is the news program of the Uruguayan Channel 4. It has been broadcast daily since 1968.

Three editions of the newscast are produced by Channel 4, being called differently, depending on the time of day, and are simulcast live on owned-and-operated stations throughout the country.

== History ==
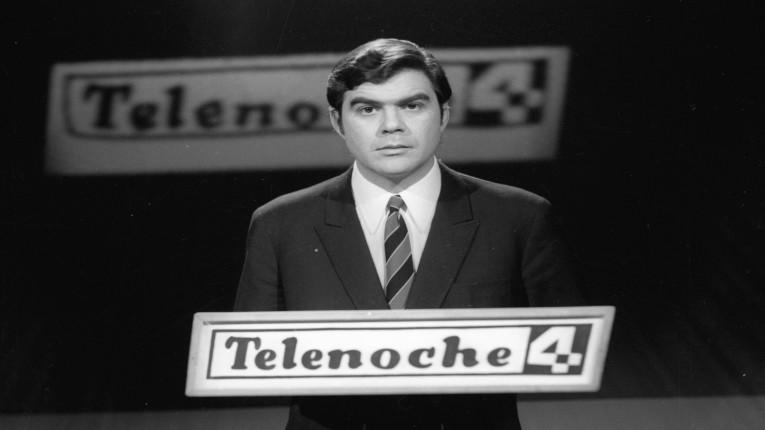
Carlos Giacosa, creator and first presenter of Telenoche 4.

It debuted on April 29, 1968, being presented by journalist Carlos Giacosa for 20 years. He was succeeded in 1988 by Jorge Wilson Arellano.

In 1992, the well-known Monte Carlo News Center was inaugurated, with a set inspired by that used by CNN at that time. It went through several reformulations between 1998, 2000 and 2011. In May 1993 Fernando Vilar joined the newscast as anchor.

On August 4, 2015, Fernando Vilar left Telenoche, being replaced by Daniel Castro, who had presented Teledía Primera Hora, the morning edition. On May 2, 2016, the former CNN en Español correspondent Karina Dalmás, joined Castro as a co-anchor.

In April 2017, a "new" Telenoche was announced through advertisements; days later, the newscast completely renews its graphics and set design, eliminating the Monte Carlo News Center. In February 2018, after Karina Dalmás did not go on the air for several days, some media reports speculated that the newscaster would leave Telenoche. Dalmás' departure was made official in the following days, and she explained that it occurred after there was no contractual agreement with the network authorities.

On April 29, 2018, a two-hour special edition was broadcast due to the 50th anniversary of the premiere of the newscast. In it, important moments in its history were presented, such as coverage of historical events; In addition, relatives of journalists who worked in the news division visited the studio, which was renamed in honor of Carlos Giacosa.

In April 2021, coinciding with the 60th anniversary of the network, the scenery was modified, incorporating two co-anchors and new news sections. In September 2022, it was announced that Daniel Castro would be leaving Telenoche; he was temporarily replaced by Marcelo Irachet. On January 16, 2023, a renovation of the scenery and graphics of the newscast was carried out. Additionally, Jaime Clara joined as the news anchor.

== News Editions ==
The news division of Channel 4 has three editions:

- Teledía Primera Hora: It airs Monday through Friday from 7:00 a.m. to 8:00 a.m. and is presented by Nicolás Núñez and Viviana Aguerre.
- Teledía: It airs Monday through Friday from 12:30 p.m. to 2:00 p.m. and is presented by Roberto Hernández and Yisela Moreira. It debuted in 1991, and was the only news broadcast on that schedule for several years.
- Telenoche: It airs Monday through Sunday 7:00 p.m. and is presented by Jaime Clara.

== Journalists ==
- Jaime Clara (Co-Anchor – Telenoche)
- Viviana Ruggiero (Co-Anchor – Telenoche)
- Emilio Izaguirre (Co-Anchor – Telenoche)
- Viviana Aguerre (Co-Anchor – Teledía)
- Yisela Moreira (Co-Anchor – Teledía and Telenoche Sunday)
- Roberto Hernández (Co-Anchor – Teledía)
- Leonardo Pedrouza (Reporter – Presenter: Teledía Saturday)
- Mariela Martínez (Reporter – Presenter: Teledía Sunday)
- Leonardo Luzzi (Reporter – Presenter: Telenoche Sunday and Telenoche Saturday)
- Nubel Cisneros (Weatherman)
- Federico Paz (Sports)
- Leonardo Sanguinetti (Sports)
- Eduardo Rivas (Sports)
- Edward Piñón (Sports)
- Sergio Gorzy (Sports)
- Juan Pablo da Costa (Sports)
- Marecelo Irachet (Reporter)
- Mariana Sequeira (Reporter)
