= Sodre National Auditorium =

Arts centre in Montevideo, Uruguay

Auditorio Nacional Adela Reta Adela Reta National Auditorium
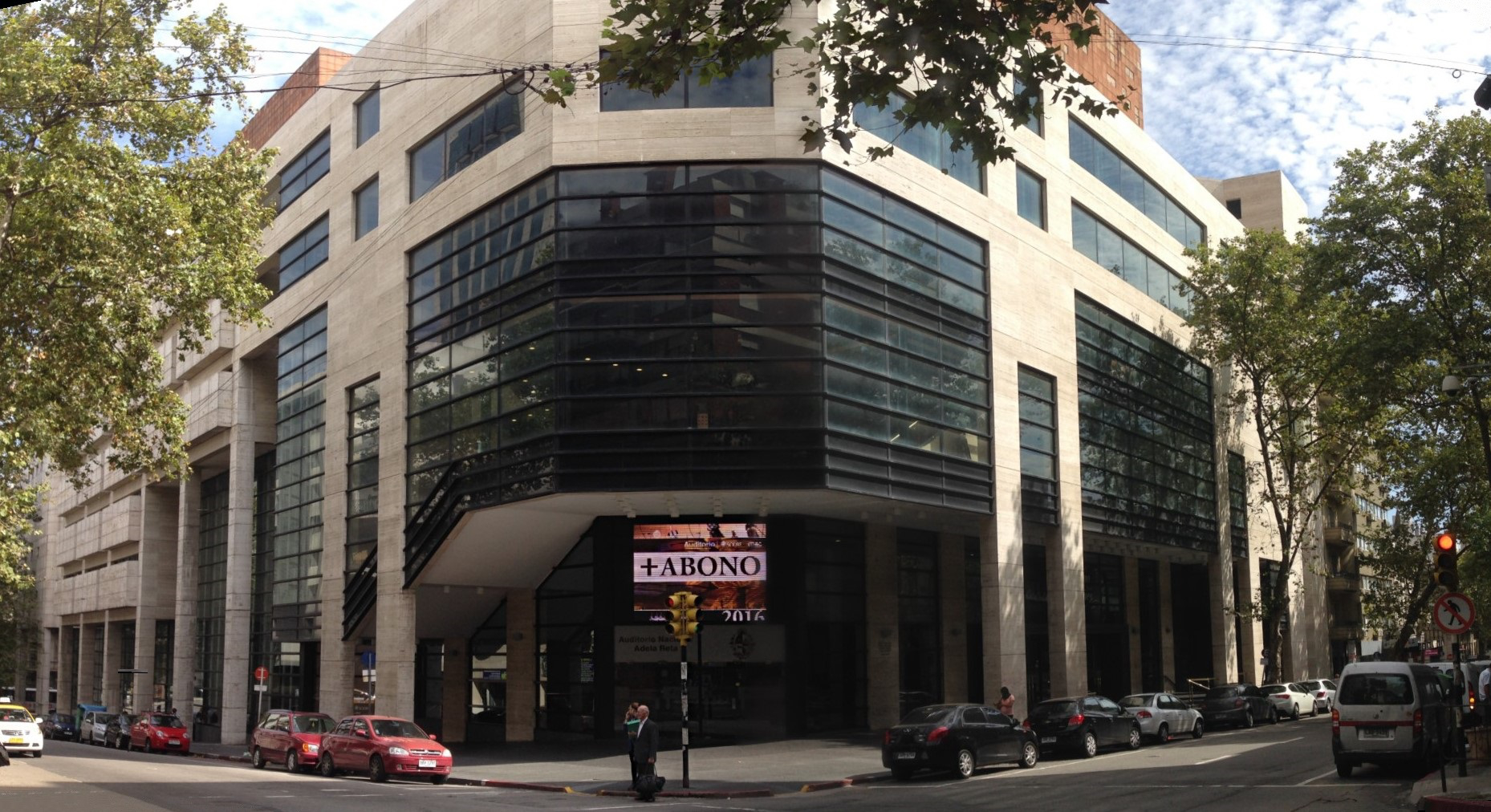
- Interactive map of the Auditorio Nacional Adela Reta; Adela Reta National Auditorium area

General information
- Type: Arts complex
- Location: 1455 Andes Road; Montevideo, Uruguay
- Coordinates: 34.9042°S 56.1987°W
- Construction started: 1989
- Opened: 21 November 2009

Technical details
- Structural system: Concrete

Design and construction
- Architects: Jorge Di Pólito; Diego Magnone; Isidoro Singer; Juan Carlos Vanini

Website
- Official website

The National Auditorium of Sodre Dr. Adela Reta is a venue located in Montevideo, Uruguay. It is named after the lawyer, former minister and president of the Official Service of Broadcasting, Television and Entertainment, Adela Reta (1921–2001).

On August 29, 2019, the Ministry of Education and Culture, through the National Cultural Heritage Commission, designated the Auditorio Nacional del Sodre as a Historical Monument of Uruguay.

It is located in the old Urquiza Theater building, which caught fire on September 18, 1971. In addition, it is the home of the National Ballet of Uruguay.

== Features ==
Established in the historic downtown corner of Andes and Mercedes, on an approximate area of 25,000 m², it has two halls, "Eduardo Fabini" and "Hugo Balzo", prepared to host shows, an amphitheater, exhibition areas and large circulation areas, in addition to rehearsal rooms and workshops.

=== Halls ===
The "Eduardo Fabini Hall" has approximately 2000 seats. It is intended for lyrical, symphonic and ballet shows. Its pit can house more than 100 musicians, organized into three modules with movements, based on an automated lifting system. The stage, the largest in the country, has a free height of 27 meters and an adjustable stage opening that can reach a maximum of 15.5 meters wide by 12 meters long.

The "Hugo Balzo Hall" has a capacity of approximately 280 seats and offers great technical and scenic flexibility, ideal for its transformation. Destined for chamber music, today it is presented as a multipurpose room, capable of taking on the stage challenges of small-format shows. Annex to this room are the audio and video recording venues, both for the shows that take place in the Balzo room and in the other rooms.

== Image gallery ==
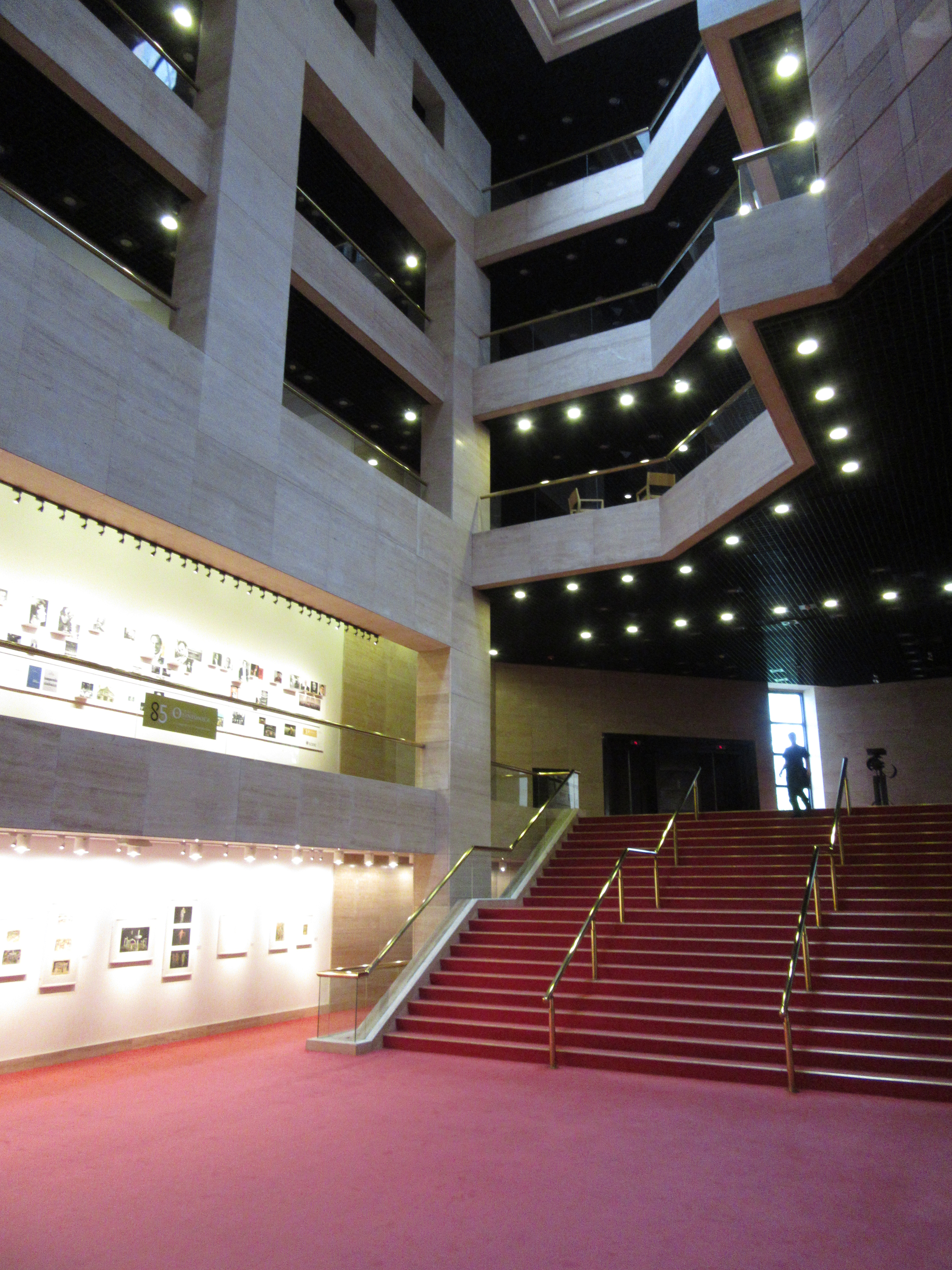
Theater Lobby

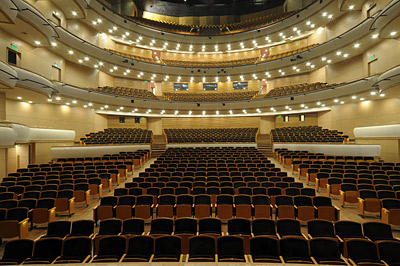
Eduardo Fabini Hall

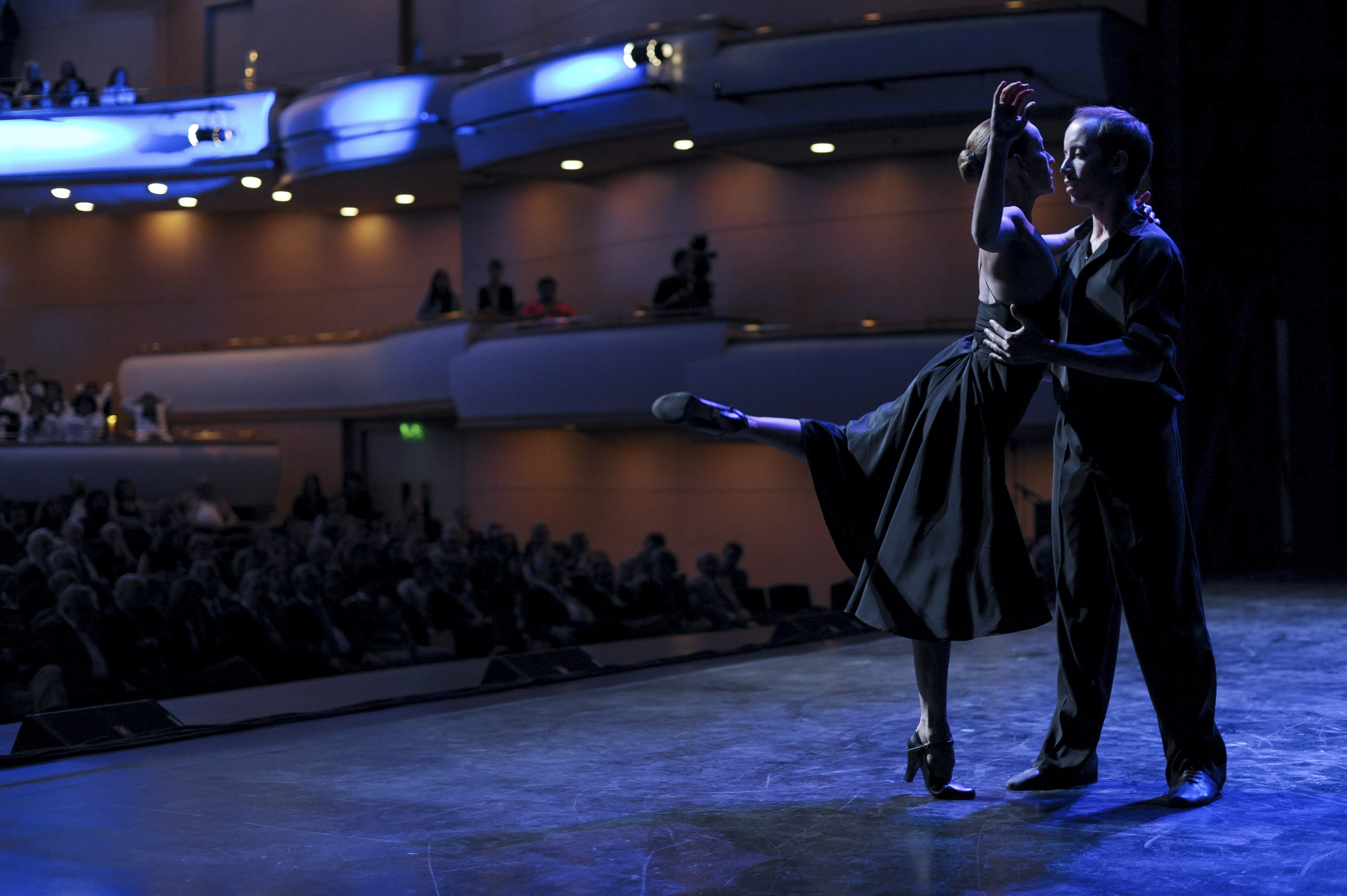
National Ballet performance

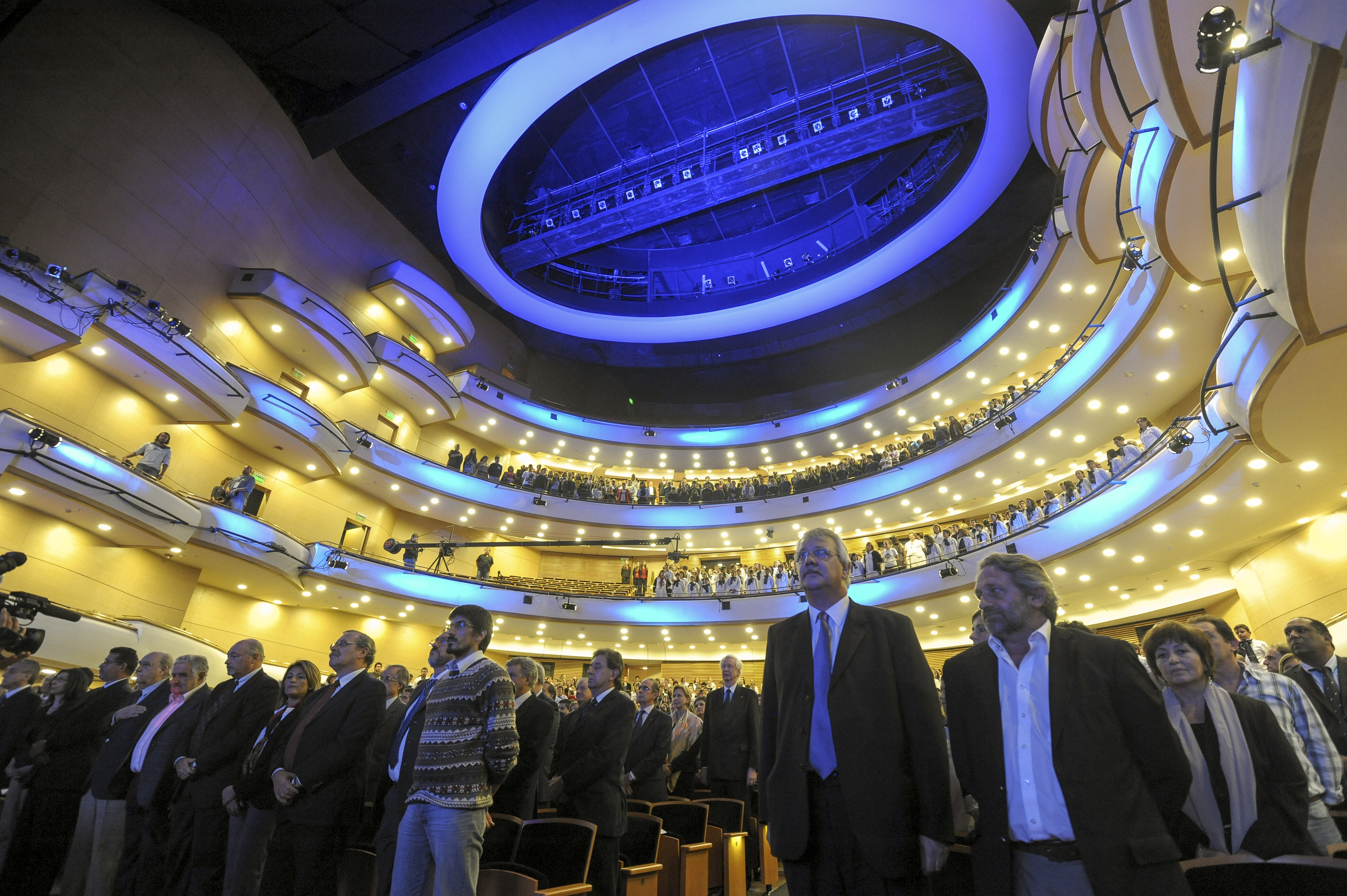
Celebration of the Bicentennial of the XIII Instructions

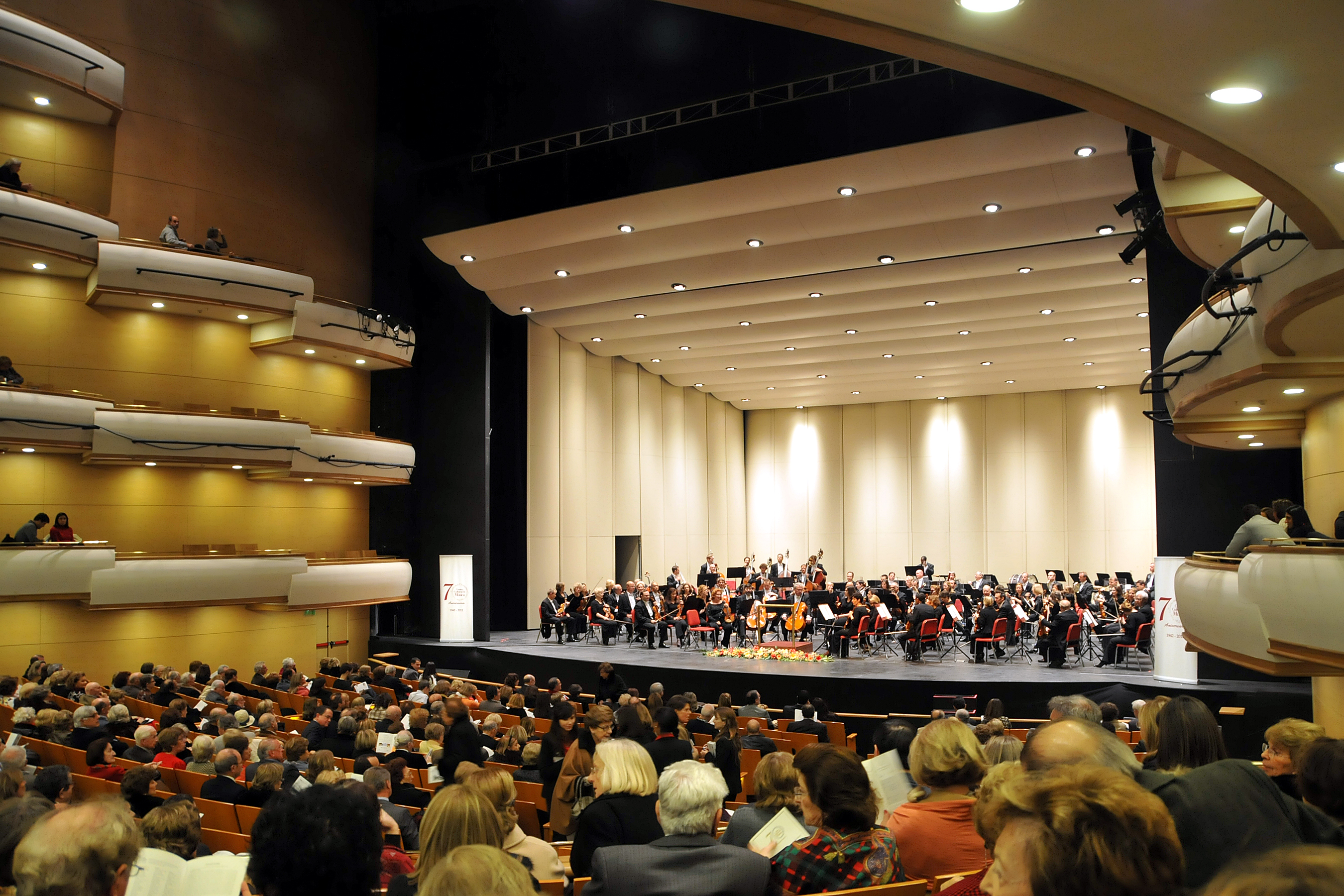
Stage

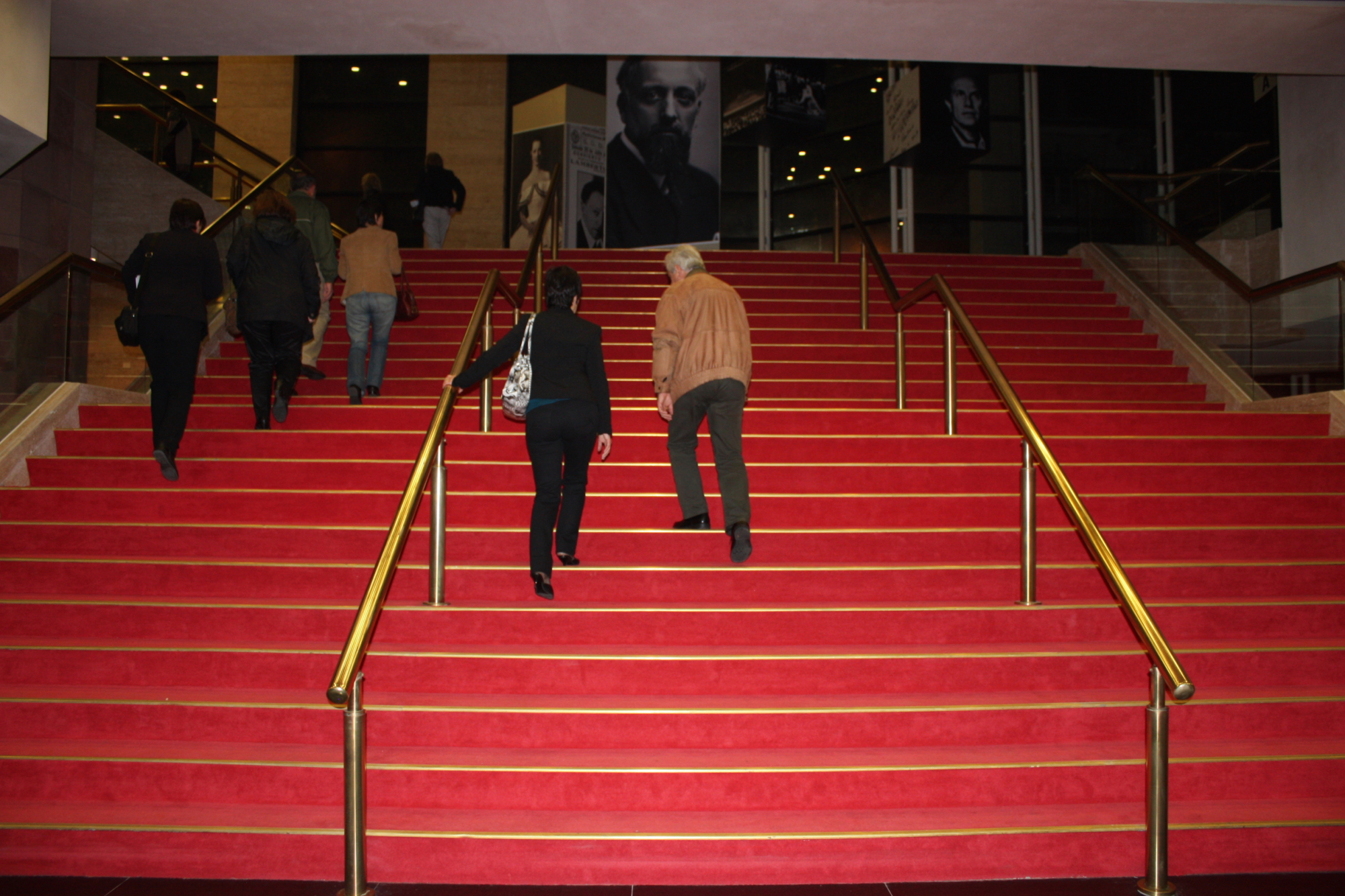
Main stairs
