= María Noel Riccetto =

Uruguayan ballet dancer and arts administrator

Maria Noel Riccetto
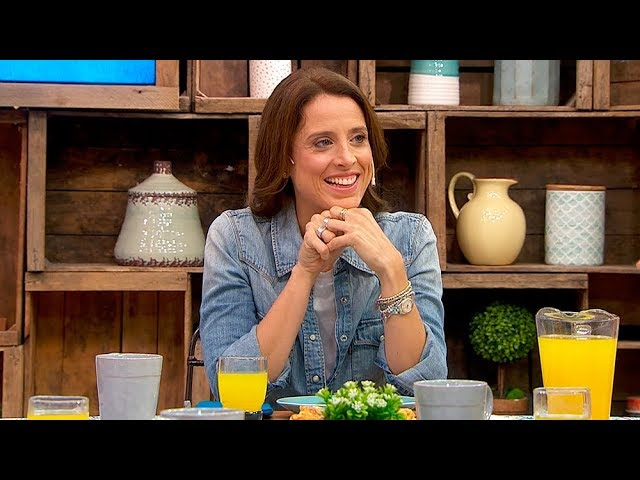
- Born: Maria Noel Riccetto; 27 March 1980 (age 45); Montevideo, Uruguay
- Education: Uruguay National Ballet School; North Carolina School of the Arts
- Known for: Ballet
- Children: 1

María Noel Riccetto Barusso (born 27 March 1980) is an Uruguayan ballet dancer, television personality and arts administrator, who currently serves as the artistic director of the National Ballet of Uruguay. A former soloist with American Ballet Theatre (ABT), she was awarded the Prix Benois de la Danse in 2017.

== Early life ==
María Noel Riccetto Barusso was born on 27 March 1980 in Montevideo, to Hugo Riccetto and María Barusso. She is of Italian descent on both parents' sides. Raised Catholic, she attended Colegio Las Teresas, Colegio Jesús María in Carrasco, and Colegio de la Inmaculada Concepción in Centro.

== Dance career ==
She began studying ballet at the Uruguay National Ballet School in 1990. She was hired as a professional dancer in 1995 by the Uruguayan National Ballet, which depends on the Official Service of Broadcasting, Television and Entertainment (SODRE), dancing pieces by Rodolfo Lastra, Ivan Tenorio, Jaime Pintos, and others. In 1998, Riccetto was named "Revelation of the Year" by Uruguayan dance critic Washington Roldan, and received the Elena Smirnova Prize from Enrique Honorio Destaville, an Argentine ballet reviewer. Later that year she attended the North Carolina School of the Arts on a full scholarship. There she performed in Grand Pas Romantique (choreographed and staged by Fernando Bujones) and Intermezzo (choreographed by Eliot Feld).

She also danced the roles of the Sugar Plum Fairy and the Snow Queen in The Nutcracker. In 1999, when the production was performed at the Hungarian National Academy, Ms. Riccetto was invited to Budapest to reprise her role as the Sugar Plum Fairy, dancing with Gabor Szigeti, a soloist with the Hungarian National Ballet. Riccetto was as a guest artist at the 25th Anniversary Gala for the Uruguay National Ballet School and was invited by that country's First Lady to dance in Montevideo and Punta Del Este. In August 1999, Riccetto joined American Ballet Theatre's corps de ballet and three years later she was promoted to soloist.

Riccetto was the "dance double" for Mila Kunis in the 2010 film Black Swan, a psychological thriller about ballet dancers in New York City.

After 13 years of dancing in the American Ballet Theatre, in 2012 Riccetto came back to Uruguay to dance in the Uruguayan National Ballet, directed by Argentinian former dancer Julio Bocca. In 2017, Riccetto was awarded a Prix Benois de la Danse for her performance of Tatiana in Onegin.

In September 2019, Channel 10 cast Riccetto as a judge on it its upcoming talent show reality series Got Talent Uruguay, alongside Agustín Casanova, Claudia Fernández and Orlando Petinatti.

== Awards ==
- 2017 : Prix Benois de la Danse

== Selected repertoire ==
American Ballet Theatre.

- the Girl in Afternoon of a Faun
- Calliope in Apollo
- first and third Shades in La Bayadère
- Petal in Cinderella
- Prayer in Coppélia
- Gulnare and an Odalisque in Le Corsaire
- Mercedes, Amour and a flower girl in Don Quixote
- Giselle, the peasant pas de deux and Zulma in Giselle
- the Two of Diamonds in Jeu de cartes
- Valencienne in The Merry Widow
- Clara in The Nutcracker
- Olga in Onegin
- Natalia in On the Dnieper
- the Street Dancer in Petrouchka
- Henrietta in Raymonda
- the Lilac Fairy, Fairy of Sincerity and Princess Florine in The Sleeping Beauty
- the Young Girl in Le Spectre de la Rose
- the pas de trois and the Italian Princess in Swan Lake
- the Mazurka and Prelude in Les Sylphides
- the Greedy One in Three Virgins and a Devil

== Personal life ==
In August 2024, she announced that she was pregnant with her first child with her partner, photographer Ignacio Guani. She announced the birth of their son on December 7, 2024.
