= Annasofía Facello =

Uruguayan actress and television presenter

- Born: November 26, 1986 (age 38); Montevideo, Uruguay
- Occupations: Actress; television presenter
- Years active: 2011-present

Annasofía Facello (born 26 November 1986) is a Uruguayan actress and television presenter.

== Career ==
Her beginnings in television was as a production assistant on the Channel 10 show Consentidas, and later on Lo mejor de lo mejor. In 2011 she made her first on-screen appearance as a reporter for the show Conectados. From 2012 to 2014 she was part of Yo y 3 más hosted by Jorge Piñeyrúa, which allowed her to be awarded the Revelation Award in Television, at the 20th Iris Awards. She was the co-host of the Uruguayan version of Raid the Cage, Escape Perfecto and of its spin-off featuring celebrities with Claudia Fernández.

In 2019 she hosted the brewers reality show Brew Master, a reality show broadcast on Channel 10. In June 2020, together with Noelia Etcheverry, she hosted the spin-off program of Got Talent Uruguay, Amamos el talento. In 2021 she starred in the short film Made in China and hosted Bake Off Uruguay on Channel 4.

== Filmography ==
=== Television ===
| Year | Title | Role |
|---|---|---|
| 2011–2012 | Conectados | Herself (reporter) |
| 2012–2014 | Yo y tres más | Herself (announcer) |
| 2013–2014 | Lo sabe o no lo sabe | Herself (co-host) |
| 2014–2020 | Escape perfecto | Herself (co-host) |
| 2019 | Brew Master | Herself (host) |
| 2020 | Amamos el Talento | Herself (co-host) |
| 2021 | Bake Off Uruguay | Herself (host) |
| 2023 | Argentina, tierra de amor y venganza | Fabiana |
| 2023 | ¿Quién es la máscara? | Herself (winner) |
| 2024–present | Veo cómo cantas | Herself (panelist) |
| 2024 | Margarita | Paloma |

=== Series ===
| Año | Título | Papel | Notas |
|---|---|---|---|
| 2023 | Los Protectores (temporada 2) | Mechi | Star+ |

=== Cine ===
| Año | Título | Papel | Notas |
|---|---|---|---|
| 2025 | Corazón delator | Gi | Dirigida por Marcos Carnevale. Disponible en Netflix. |
| 2022 | Noche Americana | Azafata | Dirigida por Alejandro Bazano. |

== Awards and nominations ==
| Year | Association | Category | Nominated work | Result | Ref. |
|---|---|---|---|---|---|
| 2014 | Iris Award | TV Revelation | Yo y 3 más | Won | |
