= Punta de Rieles – Bella Italia =

Punta de Rieles - Bella Italia
- Barrio
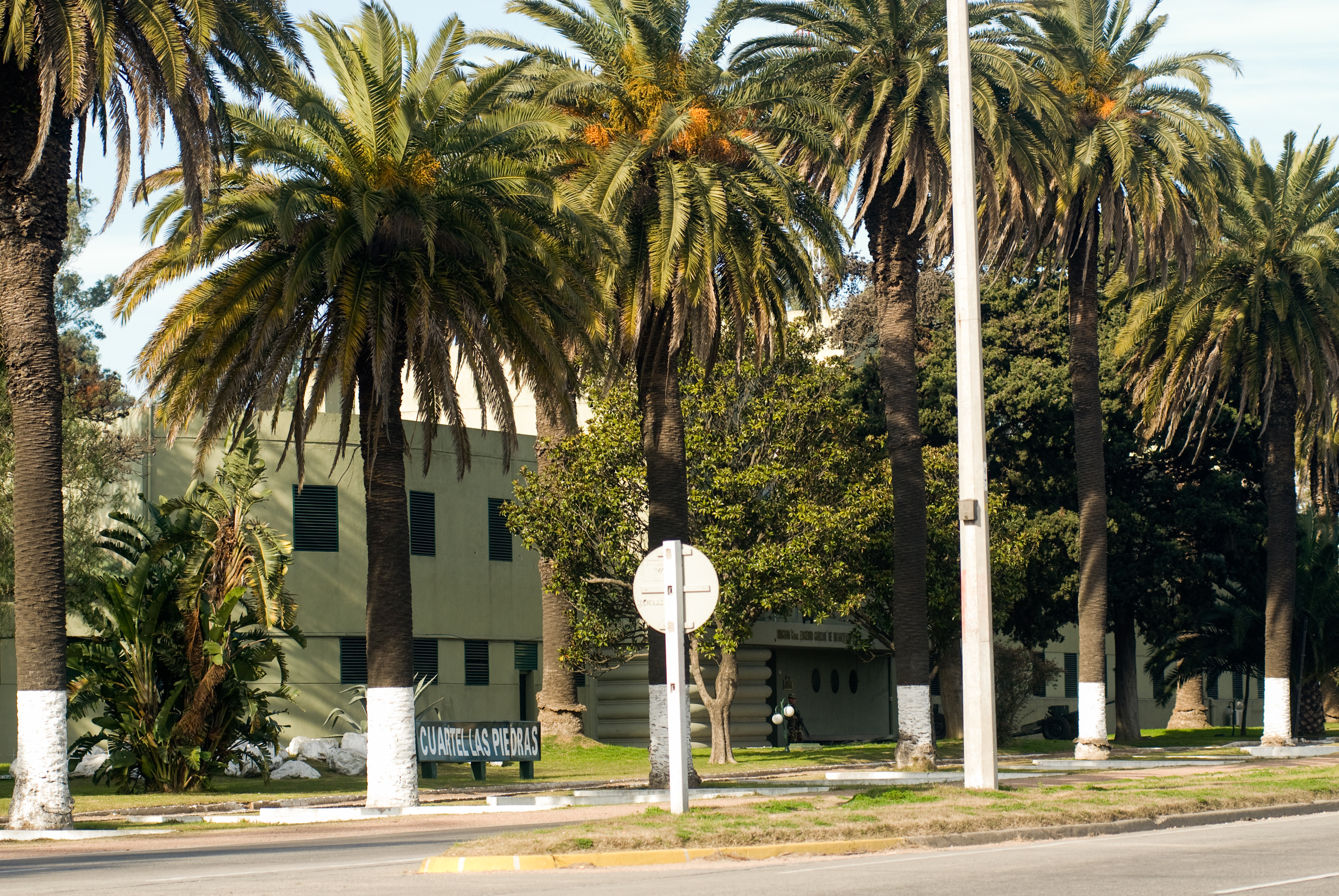

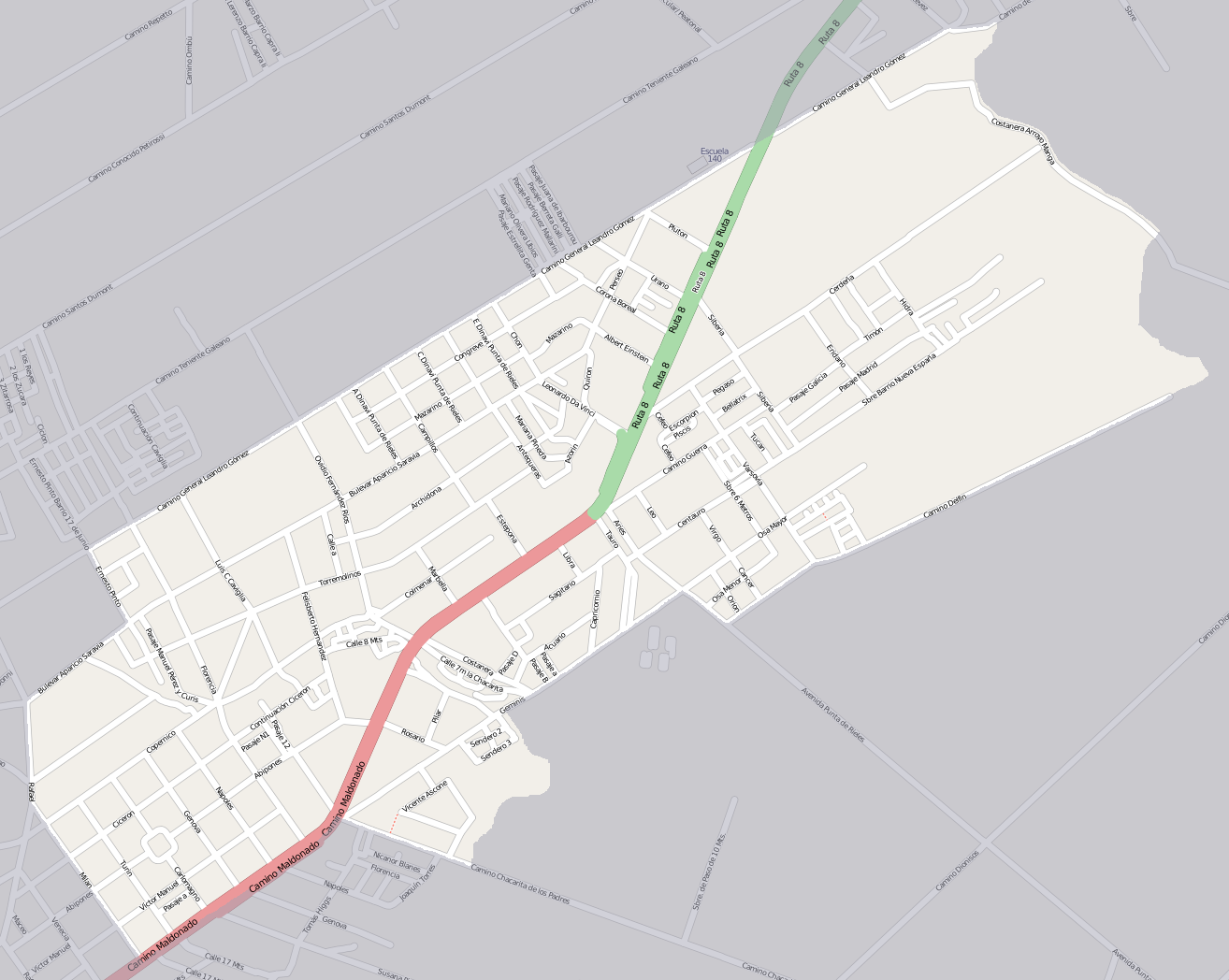
- Street map of Punta de Rieles - Bella Italia

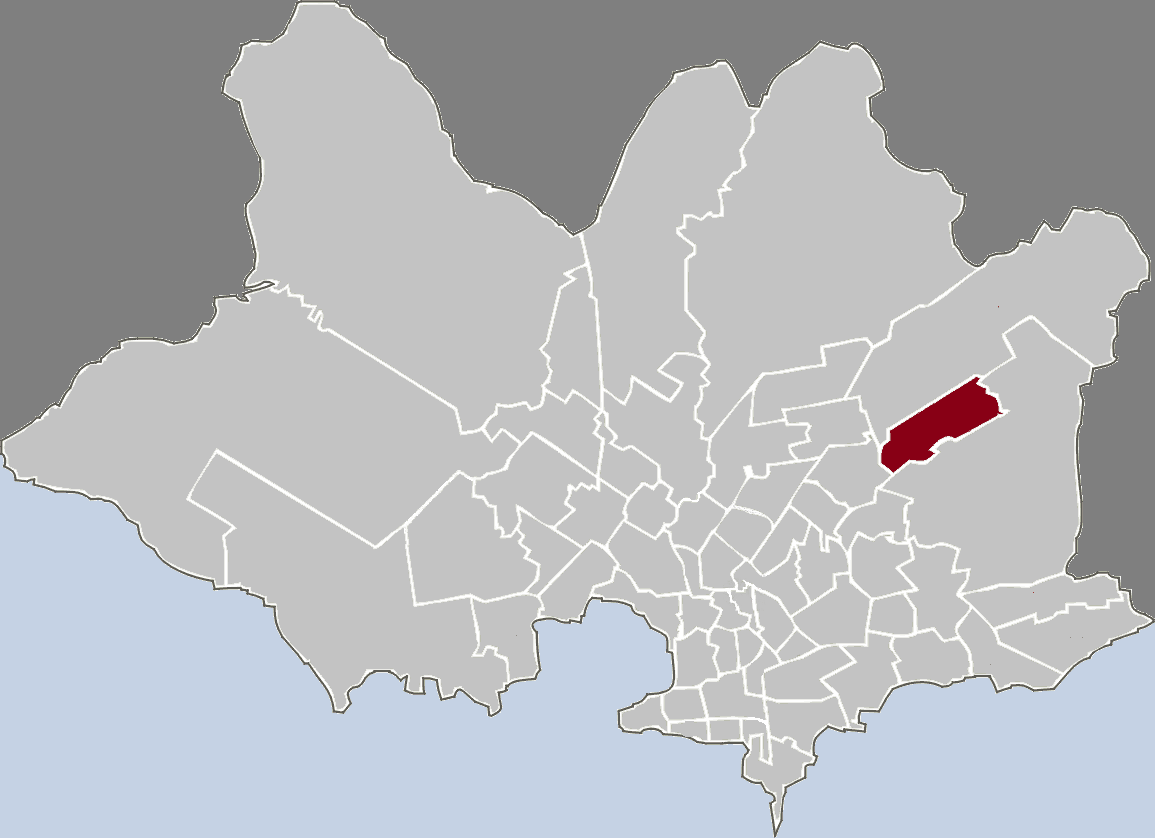
- Location of Pta de Rieles /Bella Italia in Montevideo
- Coordinates: 34°49′58″S 56°7′0″W
- Country: Uruguay
- Department: Montevideo Department
- City: Montevideo

Punta de Rieles – Bella Italia (Italian: [ˈbɛlla iˈtaːlja]) is a barrio (neighbourhood or district) of Montevideo, Uruguay.

== Places of worship ==
- Parish Church of St John Bosco, Camino Maldonado Km 16 Nº 7777 (Roman Catholic, Salesians of Don Bosco)

== See also ==
- Barrios of Montevideo
