= Natalia Oreiro on screen and stage =

Natalia Oreiro filmography
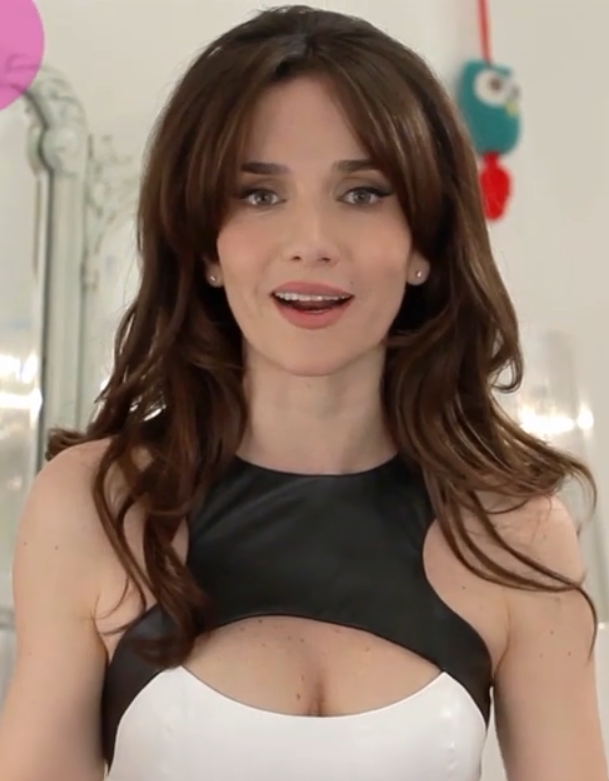
- Film: 20
- Television: 26
- Music videos: 25
- Stage: 4

The following is the list of film, television, theatre and music video credits for Uruguayan actress, singer, and TV host Natalia Oreiro. Oreiro gained widespread recognition for her starring roles in popular Argentine soup operas, including Muñeca Brava (1998-1999) and Sos mi vida (2006-2007), which established her as a household name in Latin America and beyond.

In cinema, Oreiro has starred in various notable films such as Un Argentino En Nueva York (1998), Wakolda (2013), and Gilda, no me arrepiento de este amor (2016), where she portrayed the iconic Argentine singer Gilda, earning critical acclaim. Her diverse roles have showcased her versatility as an actress, crossing genres from comedy to drama.

The Uruguayan singer has been featured in over twenty music videos. From her self-titled debut album Natalia Oreiro (1998), she released music videos for the singles "Que sí, que sí", "De tu amor", "Cambio dolor", and "Me muero de amor".

== Filmography ==
=== Film ===
Key
†	Denotes films that have not yet been released

List of films and roles
Title	Year	Role	Director	Notes	Ref.
Un argentino en Nueva York	1998	Verónica de Ricci	Juan José Jusid	Lead role	
Cleopatra	2003	Milagros "Sandra"	Eduardo Mignogna	Supporting role	
La peli	2007	Lola Montero	Gustavo Postiglione	Cameo appearance	
Las vidas posibles	2008	Marcia Miconi	Sandra Gugliotta	Supporting role: Nominated—Silver Condor Award for Best Supporting Actress	
Música en espera	2009	Paula Otero	Hernán Goldfrid	Lead role: Silver Condor Award for Best Actress	
Francia	2010	Cristina	Adrián Caetano	Lead role	
Miss Tacuarembó	2010	Natalia "Cristal" / Cándida López	Martín Sastre	Lead role: Uruguayan Film Critics Association Award for Best Actress	
Mi primera boda	2011	Leonora Bellami	Ariel Winograd	Lead role	
Infancia clandestina	2012	Cristina "Charo"	Benjamín Ávila	Lead role: Silver Condor Award for Best Actress	
Wakolda	2013	Eva	Lucía Puenzo	Lead role: Silver Condor Award for Best Actress; Nominated—Platino Award for Best Actress	
Gilda, no me arrepiento de este amor	2016	Gilda	Lorena Muñoz	Lead role: Silver Condor Award for Best Actress; Nominated—Platino Award for Best Actress	
Los últimos	2017	Dra. Ortega	Nicolás Puenzo	Supporting role	
Re loca	2018	Pilar	Martino Zaidelis	Lead role	
Nasha Natasha	2020	Herself	Martín Sastre	Documentary film; also producer	
La noche mágica	2021	Kira Damato	Gastón Portal	Lead role	
Hoy se arregla el mundo	2022	Silvina	Ariel Winograd	Supporting role	
Las Rojas	2022	Constanza	Matías Lucchesi	Lead role: Nominated—Silver Condor Award for Best Actress	
Asfixiados	2023	Herself	Luciano Podcaminsky	Cameo appearance	
Casi muerta	2023	María	Fernán Mirás	Lead role	
Manuel Ugarte: el destino de un continente	2023	Delmira Agostini	Federico Molnar and Martín Pigna	Documentary film	
Campamento con mamá	2024	Patricia Pomiró	Martino Zaidelis	Lead role	
La noche sin mí	2025	Eva	María Laura Berch and Laura Chiabrando	Lead role	
La mujer de la fila	2025	Andrea Casamento	Benjamín Ávila	Lead role	
Письмо Деду Морозу (Carta a Papá Noel)	2025	Herself	Kirill Kuzin	Lead role	
Sin equipaje †	TBA	TBA	Juan Taratuto	Lead role	
Bajo tus pies †	TBA	TBA	Cristian Bernard	Lead role	

=== Short film ===
Key
†	Denotes short films that have not yet been released

List of short films and roles
Title	Year	Role	Director	Notes	Ref.
La guerra de los gimnasios	2004	Herself	Diego Lerman	Supporting role	
La despedida	2012	Silvina	Diego Suárez	Lead role	
Protocolo Celeste	2014	"Celeste" agent	Martín Sastre	Lead role; in support of Uruguay 2030 FIFA World Cup bid	
100 años de cine argentino	2014	Paleontologist / Herself	Martín Sastre	Lead role; a series of three short films in support of the INCAA National Short Film Contest on the occasion of the 100th anniversary of the first Argentine film	
Proyecto divergente	2022	Narrator	Ramiro San Honorio	Voice; Animated short film	

== Television ==
=== Series ===
Key
†	Denotes series that have not yet aired
‡	Denotes series that did not air

List of series appearances and roles
Title	Year	Role	Network	Notes	Ref.
Alta comedia	1993–1994	Margarita / Florencia	Canal 9	2 episodes	
Aprender a volar	1994	Mónica	El Trece	Episode: "¿Por qué no hablamos de sexo?"	
Inconquistable Corazón	1994–1995	Victoria	Canal 9	4 episodes	
Dulce Ana	1995	Verónica Iturbe Montalbán	Canal 9	3 episodes	
90-60-90 Modelos	1996	Lucía Peralta	Canal 9	Main role; 277 episodes	
Ricos y Famosos	1997–1998	Valeria García Méndez de Salerno	Canal 9	Main role; 180 episodes	
Casablanca ‡	1998	Rosita	Telefe	Main role; 20 episodes	
Muñeca Brava	1998–1999	Milagros "La Cholito" Esposito-Di Carlo de Miranda	Telefe	Main role; 270 episodes: Nominated—Martín Fierro Award for Best Leading Actress in a Drama Series (1999 and 2000)	
La Argentina de Tato	1999	Evangelina Salazar	Canal 13	Episode: "Episode 6"	
Cabecita	1999–2000	Milagros "La Cholito"	Telefe	Cameo appearance	
Los buscas de siempre	2000	N/A	Canal 9	Cameo appearance	
Kachorra	2002	Antonia Guerrero (aka "Kachorra") / Rosario Achával	Telefe	Main role; 150 episodes: Nominated—Martín Fierro Award for Best Leading Actress in a Comedy Series	
El Deseo	2004	Carmen Monteverde	Telefe	Main role; 90 episodes	
Botines	2005	Renée	Canal 13	Episode: "Bailarina en rosa y verde"	
V ritme tango	2006	Natalia Solanos	Piervy Kanal	Main role; 16 episodes	
Sos Mi Vida	2006–2007	Esperanza Muñoz (aka "La Monita")	Canal 13	Main role; 231 episodes: Martín Fierro Award for Best Leading Actress in a Comedy Series	
Patito Feo	2007	Patricia González	Canal 13	Episode: "¡La historia más linda!"	
Amanda O	2008	Amanda O	América TV	Main role; 120 episodes: Martín Fierro Award for Best Leading Actress in a Comedy Series	
Cuando Me Sonreís	2011	Leonora Bellami	Telefe	Episode "Patear el tablero"	
Lynch	2012–2013	Isabel Reyes (aka "Mariana")	Moviecity	Main role; 30 episodes	
Solamente Vos	2013–2014	Aurora Andrés	Canal 13	Main role; 223 episodes: Martín Fierro Award for Best Leading Actress in a Comedy Series; Tato Award for Best lead actress in comedy	
Entre Caníbales	2015	Ángeles Pellegrini / Ariana Mendoza	Telefe	Main role; 60 episodes: Martín Fierro Award for Best Leading Actress in Daily Fiction	
El host	2018	Herself	Fox Premium	Special guest star; Episode: "Episode 2" (Season 1)	
Grisel ‡	2019	Grisel	Telefe	Main role; 10 episodes; also co-writer and producer	
Iosi, el espía arrepentido	2022–2023	Claudia	Amazon Prime Video	Main role; 8 episodes: Nominated—Silver Condor Award for Best Supporting Actress – Series, Miniseries or Television Film; Nominated—Martin Fierro Award for Best Actress – Series	
Santa Evita	2022	Eva Perón	Star+	Main role; 7 episodes: Silver Condor Award for Best Actress – Television Series Drama; Nominated—Platino Award for Best Actress in a Miniseries or TV series	
Pra Sempre Paquitas	2024	Herself	Globoplay	Documentary series; Episode 3	
La jefa...aunque no quiera†	2026	Vanesa Mastone	Disney+	Main role	

=== Reality ===
Key
†	Denotes reality programs that have not yet aired

List of reality programs appearances and roles
Title	Year	Role	Network	Notes	Ref.
El Show de Xuxa	1993	Herself / Contestant	Telefe	Winner of the "Super Paquita" Contest	
Carramba, che sorpresa	2000	Herself / Musical Guest	RAI	Dueto y entrevista con Raffaella Carrà	
Recurso Natural	2008	Herself	Canal 7	Host	
Se Dice De Mi	2010	Herself	Canal Encuentro	Host	
La Voz Argentina	2018	Herself / Guest Judge	Telefe	Season 2 (Episode: E46)	
Got Talent Uruguay	2020–2022	Herself / Host	Canal 10	Season 1–3	
La Voz Uruguay	2022–2023	Herself / Host	Canal 10	Season 1–2	
¿Quién es la máscara?	2022	Herself / Host	Telefe	Season 1	
Музыкальная Интуиция (Musical Intuition)	2022	Herself / Contestant	ТNT	Season 2 (2 episodes)	
¿Quién es la máscara?	2026	Octopus / Contestant	Teledoce	Season 5	

=== TV Special ===
Key
†	Denotes TV specials that have not yet aired

List of TV Specials appearances and roles
Title	Year	Role	Network	Notes	Ref.
Gala de la Hispanidad	1998	Herself / Musical Guest			
Teen Choice Awards	2000	Herself / Reporter	Fox	Latinoamerica reporter	
Festival de Viña del Mar	2001	Herself / Headliner	Canal 13 Chile	Reina del Festival y Ganadora de la Gaviota de Plata	
Festival de Viña del Mar	2002	Herself / Host	Canal 13 Chile		
Un sol para los chicos	2006, 2008, 2010, 2013, 2015	Herself	El Trece		
Premios Martin Fierro	2011	Herself / Host	El Trece		
38° Festival de Cine Internacional de Moscú	2016	Host / Musical Guest			
Premios Platino	2016	Herself / Host	TNT		
Premios Platino	2017	Herself / Host	TNT		

== Music videos ==
List of music videos, with the directors and descriptions
Title	Year	Other performer(s) credited	Director(s)	Description	Ref.
"Se fue el amor"	1997	Emanuel Ortega	Juan Moya	This video clip was filmed in 1995 in the streets of Madrid, Spain, showing places like Plaza Major, Las Tores de Europa, la Purta del Sol.	
"Que Sí, Que Sí"	1998	None	Juan José Jusid	Filmed in New York City, the video is composed of various clips from Un Argentino en New York (1998). Natalia's character, Verónica, records "Que Sí, Que Sí" in a recording studio.	
"De Tu Amor"	1998	None	Gustavo Fiorenza	The video clip does not contain any plot, it is just about different incarnations of Natalia, from a baroque lady to a football player.	
"Cambio Dolor"	1998	None	Hernán Abrahamnsohn	It shows Oreiro singing and posing in a house, she can also be seen embodying Milagros Espósito, a character from Muñeca Brava.	
"Me Muero de Amor"	1999	None	José Luis Massa	It presents Natalia, sitting on a train and walking in a forest and in the snow, while there are scenes of Oreiro with her lover. Near the end of the video clip, Natalia sits in a stream after the ring that her lover had given her fell out of the water, but later she looks at him and throws the ring into the stream.	
"Tu Veneno"	2000	None	Aaron White	Oreiro is a heroine of a comic who fights against evil, at the same time she is shown with her band.	
"Río de la Plata"	2000	None	José Luis Mazza		
"Como Te Olvido"	2001	None	N/A		
"Que Digan Lo Que Quieran"	2002	None	Nahuel Lerena		
"Esclava"	2007	None	N/A		
"Nueva farándula"	2010	Walter Domínguez	N/A		
"¡Basta ya! (Conciencia Solidaria)"	2011	Julieta Díaz, Axel, Coti, Soledad, Nacha Guevara and more	Javier Ponce Cancino		
"Todos me miran"	2013	None	Martín Sastre		
"Я умираю от любви (Me muero de amor - Russian version)"	2014	None	Martín Sastre		
"No Me Arrepiento de este Amor"	2016	None	Lorena Muñoz	The video is composed of various clips from Gilda, no me arrepiento de este amor (2016). Features Oreiro as Gilda going onstage with the band to sing the song and also them recording the song in a recording studio.	
"Corazón valiente"	2016	Rubén Rada	Claudio Divella		
"United by Love"	2018	None	Pucho Mentasti		
"To Russia with Love"	2018	None	Felix Umarov	The video was shot for the 25th anniversary of the Russian fashion brand Zarina. It shows three Russian women who love Muñeca Brava and want to be like Natalia Oreiro. One them writes her a letter and Natalia comes to Balashikha, Russia, where she throws a big party to celebrate the New Year with her fans.	
"Esta Navidad"	2020	Mijares, Joy, Manuel Medrano, Vanesa Martin, Giulia Be and Raquel Sofía	N/A		
"La Navidad de Luis"	2020	León Gieco and Leo García	Isabella Medina Gieco		
"Будем танцевать (Listo Pa'Bailar)"	2021	Bajofondo	Agustín Ferrando Trenchi and Gustavo Santaolalla	A studio video featuring Natalia and the members of Bojofondo recording the song.	
"Me Muero de Amor"	2021	Juan Ingaramo	Maxi Baldi and Matias Quiñonero		
"Nunca Más A Mi Lado (Versión 10°. Aniversario)"	2021	Florencia Núñez, Ana Prada, Agus Padilla, Meri Deal, Estela Magnone and more	Matías Bello	A studio video featuring Cristina Morán, Natalia Oreiro, Florencia Núñez, Ana Prada, Meri Deal, Agus Padilla, Estela Magnone, Cristina Fernández, Chabela Ramírez, Catherine Vergnes and the all-female band. The video begins with Cristina Morán reciting "La mujer sin miedo" by Eduardo Galeano.	
"No Hay Verdades"	2022	Ana Prada	Fabio Berrutti		
"Quiero Todo"	2022	Soledad and Lali	Guido Adler and Lautaro Espósito		
"Cumbia de los Dos"	2023	La Delio Valdez	Daniela De Vega		
"Russian Girls"	2024	None			

== Theatre ==
Production	Year	Role(s)	Director	Notes	Ref.
Las mariposas son libres	1996	Jill Tanner	Pedro Segni and Lía Jelín	Italian Circle Theatre, Buenos Aires	
Rayuela, homenaje a Julio Cortázar	2004	La Maga	Luis Luque	San Martín Theatre, Buenos Aires	
Masculino singular	2007	Odet	Santiago Doria	Regina Theatre, Buenos Aires	
Mujeres x la identidad	2007	—N/a	—N/a	Metropolitan Theatre, Buenos Aires	
Un poco toco	2008	—N/a	Norma Aleandro	Costume designer; El Piccolino Theatre, Buenos Aires	
Maktub (estaba escrito)	2009	—N/a	Valeria Lorca	Costume designer and cinematographer; El Piccolino Theatre, Buenos Aires	
Tenis	2012	Salvador's mother	Diego Beares	Voice-over; El Piccolino Theatre, Buenos Aires	
