= List of awards and nominations received by Natalia Oreiro =

Natalia Oreiro awards and nominations
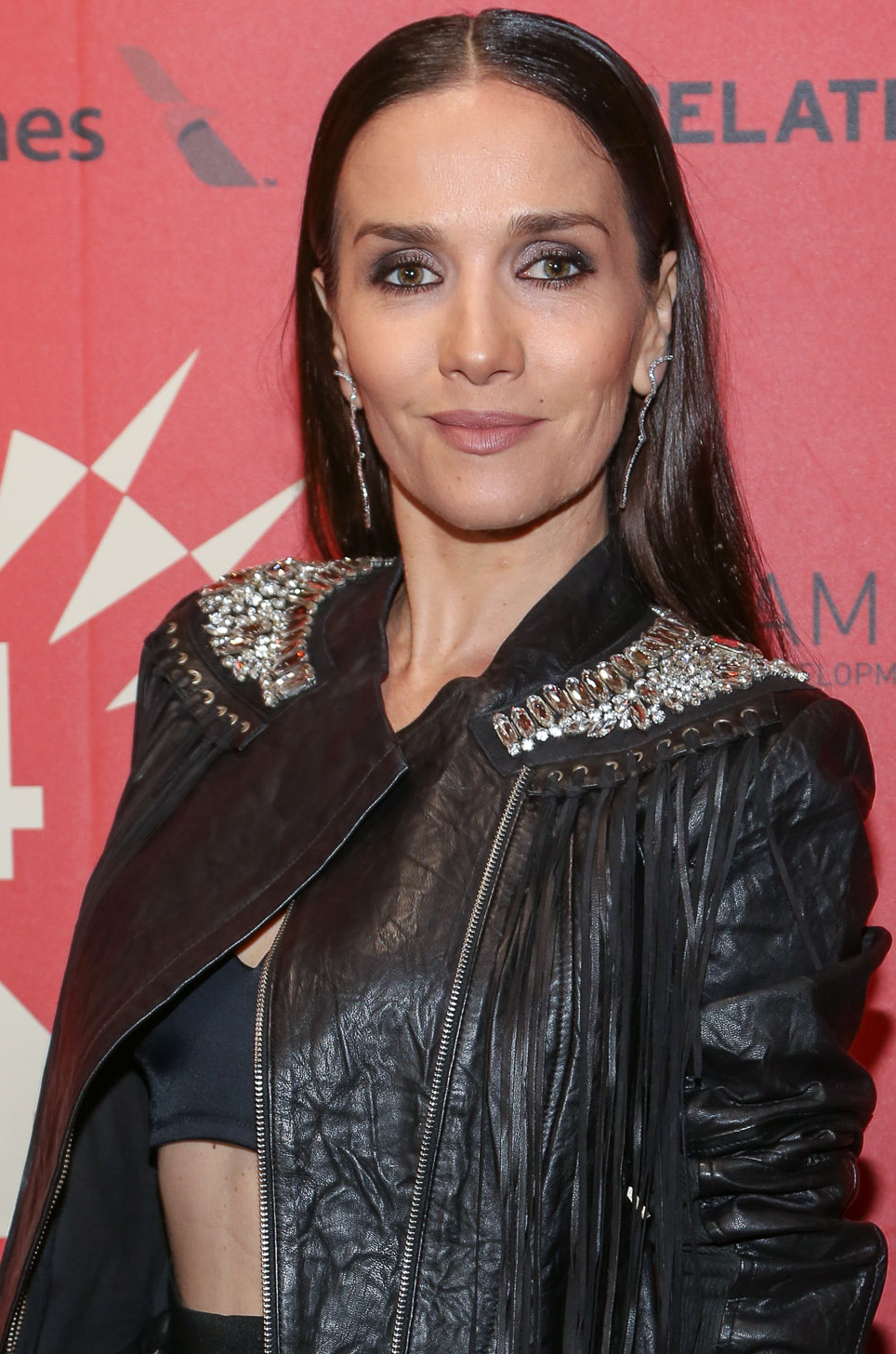
- Natalia Oreiro at the 2017 Miami International Film Festival
Awards and nominations
Award	Wins	Nominations

Totals (Note: Certain award groups do not simply award one winner. They acknowledge several different recipients, have runners-up, and have third place. Since this is a specific recognition and is different from losing an award, runner-up mentions are considered wins in this award tally. For simplification and to avoid errors, each award in this list has been presumed to have had a prior nomination.)
- Wins: 35
- Nominations: 66

Natalia Oreiro is a Uruguayan actress, singer, and fashion designer who has received numerous awards and nominations across her career in television, film, and music. She rose to international fame with her starring role in the telenovela Muñeca Brava (1998–1999), which earned her critical acclaim and multiple acting awards in Latin America and beyond. As a recording artist, her debut album Natalia Oreiro (1998) achieved commercial success and was followed by several studio albums that gained popularity particularly in Argentina, Russia, and Eastern Europe.

Oreiro has won accolades such as the Martín Fierro Awards for Best Actress, the Clarín Entertainment Award and Silver Condor Awards, among others. Her international appeal also led her to receive recognition in Russia, where she was awarded honorary titles and participated in major cultural events. She was nominated for an International Emmy Award for Best Actress in 2024 for her role in the miniseries Yosi. In 2021, the Konex Foundation honored her with the Konex Award (Merit Diploma) as one of the best Film Actresses of the decade in Argentina (2011–2020).

In addition to her artistic achievements, Oreiro has been recognized for her philanthropic efforts. In 2011, she was named a UNICEF Goodwill Ambassador for the Río de la Plata region.

== Awards and nominations ==
Awards and nominations received by Natalia Oreiro
Award	Year (Note: Indicates the year of ceremony. Each year is linked to the article about the awards held that year, wherever possible.)	Nominated work	Category	Result	Ref.
ACE Awards	1998	Rich and Famous	Best Actress – TV	Won	
CILSA Awards	2013	Natalia Oreiro	Social Commitment Award	Won	
Clarín Awards	2006	You Are the One	Best Actress in a Comedy Series	Nominated	
Czech Republic BRAVO Otto Awards	2000	Natalia Oreiro	Best Actress	Won	
Czech Republic BRAVO Otto Awards	2000	Natalia Oreiro	Best Singer	Won	
E! Entertainment Argentina Awards	1998	Natalia Oreiro	Celebrity Of The Year	Won	
E! Entertainment Argentina Awards	1999	Natalia Oreiro	Celebrity Of The Year	Won	
Fine Arts International Film Festival	2012	Clandestine Childhood	Best Actress	Won	
Fort Lauderdale Film Festival	2019	Natalia Oreiro	Career Achievement Award	Won	
Gardel Awards	1999	Natalia Oreiro	Best Female Pop Album	Nominated	
Gardel Awards	2001	Tu Veneno	Best Female Pop Album	Nominated	
Gardel Awards	2001	"Tu Veneno"	Best Music Video	Nominated	
Gardel Awards	2003	Turmalina	Best Female Pop Album	Nominated	
Gardel Awards	2003	"Que Digan Lo Que Quieran"	Best Music Video	Nominated	
Gardel Awards	2017	I'm Gilda	Best Cinema/Television Soundtrack Album	Nominated	
Gardel Awards	2022	Listo Pa' Bailar << Будем танцевать >> (with Bajofondo)	Best Electronic Music Album	Nominated	
Giordano Awards	2008	Las Oreiro	Best Clothing Collection	Won	
Gramado Film Festival	2018	Natalia Oreiro	Crystal Kikito Award	Won	
Iris Uruguay Awards	2011	Miss Tacuarembó	Best Actress	Won	
Iris Uruguay Awards	2017	Natalia Oreiro	Platinum Iris Award	Won	
Latin Grammy Awards	2001	Tu Veneno	Best Female Pop Vocal Album	Nominated	
Martín Fierro Fashion Awards	2023	Natalia Oreiro	Best Style on Social Networks	Won	
Martín Fierro Fashion Awards	2023	Natalia Oreiro	Best Styled Actress	Nominated	
Martín Fierro Fashion Awards	2024	Natalia Oreiro	Fashion Icon Award	Won	
Martín Fierro Film & Series Awards	2024	Yosi, the Regretful Spy	Best Actress – Series	Won	
Martín Fierro Film & Series Awards	2025	The Woman in the Line	Best Actress – Film	Won	
Martín Fierro Film & Series Awards	2025	Natalia Oreiro	Golden Martín Fierro Award – Film	Won	
Martín Fierro Latino Awards	2023	Expiration Date	Best Actress in Fiction – TV, Streaming Platform, or Film	Nominated	
Martín Fierro TV Awards	1999	Wild Angel	Best Leading Actress in a Drama Series	Nominated	
Martín Fierro TV Awards	2000	Wild Angel	Best Leading Actress in a Drama Series	Nominated	
Martín Fierro TV Awards	2003	Kachorra	Best Leading Actress in a Comedy Series	Nominated	
Martín Fierro TV Awards	2007	You Are the One	Best Leading Actress in a Comedy Series	Won	
Martín Fierro TV Awards	2007	"Corazón Valiente" (from You Are the One)	Best Original Song	Nominated	
Martín Fierro TV Awards	2008	You Are the One	Best Leading Actress in a Comedy Series	Nominated	
Martín Fierro TV Awards	2009	Amanda O	Best Leading Actress in a Comedy Series	Nominated	
Martín Fierro TV Awards	2014	Only You	Best Leading Actress in a Comedy Series	Won	
Martín Fierro TV Awards	2016	Cannibals	Best Leading Actress in a Drama Series	Won	
Martín Fierro TV Awards	2025	Yosi, the Regretful Spy	Best Leading Actress in a Drama Series	Nominated	
Martín Fierro TV Awards	2025	Santa Evita	Best Leading Actress in a Drama Series	Nominated	
MTV Video Music Awards	2001	"Tu Veneno"	International Viewer's Choice: MTV Latin America (South)	Nominated	
Nickelodeon Argentina Kids' Choice Awards	2018	Natalia Oreiro	Lifetime Achievement Award	Won	
Platino Awards	2014	The German Doctor	Best Actress	Nominated	
Platino Awards	2017	I'm Gilda	Best Actress	Nominated	
Platino Awards	2017	I'm Gilda	Audience Award for Best Actress	Won	
Platino Awards	2023	Santa Evita	Best Actress in a Miniseries or TV series	Nominated	
Platino Awards	2023	Santa Evita	Audience Award for Best Actress in a Miniseries or TV series	Won	
Poland BRAVO Otto Awards	2000	Natalia Oreiro	Best Actress	Won	
PRODU Awards	2020	Got Talent Uruguay	Best Female TV Host	Nominated	
PRODU Awards	2022	Santa Evita	Best Leading Actress – Historical, Political, Social Series or Miniseries	Nominated	
PRODU Awards	2022	Yosi, the Regretful Spy	Best Leading Actress – Historical, Political, Social Series or Miniseries	Won	
PRODU Awards	2024	Yosi, the Regretful Spy	Best Leading Actress – Historical, Political, Social Series or Miniseries	Nominated	
Silver Condor Awards	2009	Possible Lives	Best Supporting Actress	Nominated	
Silver Condor Awards	2010	Music On Hold	Best Actress	Nominated	
Silver Condor Awards	2013	Clandestine Childhood	Best Actress	Won	
Silver Condor Awards	2014	The German Doctor	Best Actress	Won	
Silver Condor Awards	2017	I'm Gilda	Best Actress	Won	
Silver Condor Awards	2022	Yosi, the Regretful Spy	Best Supporting Actress – Series, Miniseries or Television Film	Nominated	
Silver Condor Awards	2022	Santa Evita	Best Actress – Television Series Drama	Won	
Silver Condor Awards	2023	The Broken Land	Best Actress	Nominated	
Silver Condor Awards	2025	Yosi, the Regretful Spy	Best Actress – Series	Nominated	
Silver Condor Awards	2025	"Si no es con vos" (from Camp Crasher)	Best Original Song – Series or Film	Won	
Stopudovy Hit FM Awards	2001	Natalia Oreiro	Most Played Artist	Won	
Story Five Star Awards	2000	Natalia Oreiro	Best Foreign Star	Won	
Sur Awards	2009	Music On Hold	Best Actress	Nominated	
Sur Awards	2012	Clandestine Childhood	Best Actress	Won	
Sur Awards	2013	The German Doctor	Best Actress	Nominated	
Sur Awards	2016	I'm Gilda	Best Actress	Won	
Sur Awards	2026	27 Nights	Best Actress	Nominated	
Tato Awards	2013	Only You	Best Leading Actress in a Comedy Series	Won	
VIVA Channel (ערוץ ויוה) Awards	2000	Wild Angel	Best Telenovela Actress	Won	
VIVA Channel (ערוץ ויוה) Awards	2000	"Cambio Dolor"	Best Telenovela Theme Song	Won	
