= Natalia Oreiro discography =

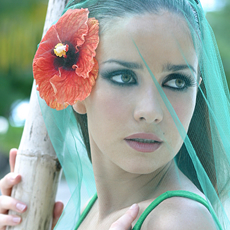
- Studio albums: 3
- Soundtrack albums: 3
- Compilation albums: 6
- Singles: 15
- Music videos: 16

This is the discography of Natalia Oreiro, a Uruguayan pop-rock singer. Oreiro has released three studio albums, six reissues albums, three soundtrack albums, twenty four singles (including five as a featured artist), three charity singles and sixteen music videos. She first appeared on the tracks "Que sí, que sí" and "Caminos" for the soundtrack Un Argentino En New York in 1998.

Oreiro's debut album, Natalia Oreiro, was released on 14 July 1998. The album peaked at No. 1 in Czech Republic, Hungary, Slovakia and at No. 4 in Grece. It spawned five singles: "Que sí, que sí", "De tu amor", "Cambio dolor", "Me muero de amor" and "Huracán". The album was reissued five times as especial editions in Argentina, Poland, Czech Republic, Hungary and Israel, incorporating remixes to the original tracklist and a DVD with live performances and the music videos of the singles.

== Albums ==
=== Studio albums ===
List of studio albums, with selected details, chart positions, sales, and certifications
Title	Album details	Peak chart positions							Sales	Certifications
Title	Album details	ARG	CZE	GRE	HUN	SVK	SPA	CHL	Sales	Certifications
Natalia Oreiro	Released: July 14, 1998; Label: Sony BMG, Ariola; Formats: CD, cassette	—	1	4	1	1	—	—	WW: 1,800,000; ARG: 400,000; SPA: 300,000; POL: 150,000; CZE: 85,000	CAPIF: Platinum; IFPI CZE: 3× Platinum; IFPI GRE: Platinum; IFPI ISR: Platinum; MAHASZ: Platinum; NFPF: Platinum; RIAJ: Gold; UPFR: Gold; ZPAV: Platinum
Tu Veneno	Released: August 8, 2000; Label: Sony BMG, Ariola; Formats: CD, cassette	—	9	2	4	3	7	7	WW: 3,600,000; ARG: 600,000; SPA: 800,000; CZE: 45,000	CAPIF: Gold; MAHASZ: Platinum; IFPI CZE: Platinum
Turmalina	Released: June 1, 2002; Label: Sony BMG, Ariola; Formats: CD, cassette	1	7	8	—	13	—	—	WW: 1,800,000; ARG: 200,000; SPA: 150,000; CZE: 10,000	IFPI CZE: Gold

=== Compilation albums ===
List of compilation albums, with selected details
Title	Album details
Natalia Oreiro (Re-Edition)	Released: 1999; Country: Argentina
Natalia Oreiro: Release for Poland	Released: 2001; Country: Poland
Natalia Oreiro 2001	Released: 2001; Country: Czech Republic
Natalia Oreiro 2001	Released: 2001; Country: Hungary
From Naty With Love	Released: 2001; Country: Israel
Turmalina (Kachorra Edition)	Released: 2003; Country: Czech Republic

=== Soundtracks ===
List of soundtrack albums, with selected details, chart positions, sales, and certifications
Title	Studio album details	Peak chart positions		Sales	Certifications
Title	Studio album details	ARG	URU	Sales	Certifications
Un Argentino en New York (with Juan Federico Jusid)	Released: May 21, 1998; Label: Sony BMG, Ariola; Formats: CD, cassette	—	—		
Miss Tacuarembó (with various artists)	Released: May 10, 2011; Label: Warner Music Spain; Formats: CD, digital download	—	—		
Gilda, No Me Arrepiento de Este Amor	Released: September 9, 2016; Label: Sony Music Argentina; Formats: CD, digital download	3	2	ARG: 20,000	CAPIF: Gold

== Extended plays ==
List of EPs, with selected details
Title	Extended play details
Listo Pa' Bailar << Будем танцевать >> (with Bajofondo)	Released: March 26, 2021; Label: Self-released; Format: Streamed audio

== Singles ==
=== As lead artist ===
List of singles as lead artist, with selected chart positions, showing year released and album name
Title	Year	Peak chart positions						Album
Title	Year	US Latin Pop	URU	ARG	RUS	POL	CZE	Album
"Que Sí, Que Sí"	1998	—	—	—	—	—	—	Un Argentino en New York and Natalia Oreiro
"De Tu Amor"	1998	—	—	—	—	—	—	Natalia Oreiro
"Cambio Dolor"	1998	—	—	—	—	5	17	Natalia Oreiro
"Me Muero de Amor"	1999	—	—	—	—	—	—	Natalia Oreiro
"Huracán"	1999	—	—	—	—	—	—	Natalia Oreiro
"Tu Veneno"	2000	26	—	—	—	—	—	Tu Veneno
"Río De La Plata"	2000	—	—	—	—	—	—	Tu Veneno
"Cómo Te Olvido"	2001	—	—	11	—	—	—	Tu Veneno
"Basta de Ti"	2001	—	—	—	—	—	—	Tu Veneno
"Un Ramito de Violetas"	2001	—	—	39	—	—	—	Tu Veneno
"Cuesta Arriba, Cuesta Abajo"	2002	—	—	20	—	—	—	Turmalina
"Que Digan Lo Que Quieran"	2002	—	—	10	—	—	—	Turmalina
"Todos Me Miran"	2013	—	—	—	—	—	—	Non-album single
"Я умираю от любви (Me Muero de Amor)"	2014	—	—	—	—	—	—	Non-album single
"No Me Arrepiento de Este Amor"	2016	—	16	—	—	—	—	Gilda, No Me Arrepiento de Este Amor
"Corazón Valiente" (featuring Rubén Rada)	2016	—	—	—	—	—	—	Gilda, No Me Arrepiento de Este Amor
"United By Love"	2018	—	—	—	131	—	—	The Official Album of the 2018 FIFA World Cup
"Mi Pobedim"	2018	—	—	—	—	—	—	The Official Album of the 2018 FIFA World Cup
"To Russia with Love"	2018	—	—	—	—	—	—	Non-album single
"Me Muero de Amor" (with Juan Ingaramo)	2021	—	—	—	—	—	—	Summer Pack
"No Hay Verdades" (with Ana Prada)	2022	—	—	—	—	—	—	No
"Quiero Todo" (with Lali and Soledad)	2022	—	16	97	—	—	—	Non-album single
"Quién es la máscara?"	2022	—	—	—	—	—	—	Who Is The Mask? (Soundtrack)
"Cumbia de los Dos" (with La Delio Valdez)	2023	—	—	—	—	—	—	Non-album single
"Si No Es Con Vos"	2024	—	—	—	—	—	—	Camp Crasher Soundtrack

=== As featured artist ===
List of singles as featured artist, with selected chart positions, showing year released and album name
Title	Year	Peak chart positions				Album
Title	Year	US Latin	MEX	MEX Pop Español	RUS	Album
"Esta Navidad" (Mijares featuring Joy, Manuel Medrano, Vanesa Martin, Giulia Be, Natalia Oreiro and Raquel Sofía)	2020	—	34	9	—	¡Feliz Navidad!
"La Navidad de Luis" (León Gieco featuring Natalia Oreiro and Leo García)	2020	—	—	—	—	Non-album single
"Будем танцевать (Listo Pa'Bailar)" (Bajofondo featuring Natalia Oreiro)	2021	—	—	—	—	Listo Pa' Bailar << Будем танцевать >>

=== Charity singles ===
List of charity singles, with selected chart positions, showing year released
Title	Year	Notes
"Esclava"	2007	Part of the No a la Trata de Personas campaign by OIM Uruguay.
"¡Basta ya!" (with various artists)	2011	Part of the ¡Basta Ya! campaign by ONG Conciencia Solidaria.
"Nunca Más A Mi Lado (Versión 10°. Aniversario)" (with various artists)	2021	Part of the Nunca Más A Mi Lado campaign by No Te Va Gustar with RUCVDS.

== Other appearances ==
List of non-single guest appearances, with other performing artists, showing year released and album name
Title	Year	Other artist(s)	Album
"Fuiste"	1998	none	Muñeca Brava (Soundtrack)
"03 03 456"	2000	Raffaella Carrà	Fiesta: Grandes Éxitos
"Basta De Ti (Dipli Zoi)"	2001	Nikos Kourkoulis	Monos Mou
"Light My Fire"	2004	none	El Deseo (Soundtrack)
"No Te Importa"	2006	none	Sos Mi Vida (Soundtrack)
"Me Voy"	2006	none	Sos Mi Vida (Soundtrack)
"Corazón Valiente"	2006	none	Sos Mi Vida (Soundtrack)
"Sueños de Juventud"	2012	none	Infancia Clandestina (Soundtrack)
"Solamente Vos"	2013	none	Solamente Vos (Soundtrack)
"Hasta el Final"	2013	none	Solamente Vos (Soundtrack)
"Como una Loba"	2013	none	Solamente Vos (Soundtrack)
"Así No Te Amará Jamás"	2013	none	Solamente Vos (Soundtrack)
"Tu Hombre"	2017	Miranda!	Fuerte
"No llores por mí Argentina"	2017	none	none
"La Marea Feminista"	2018	none	none
"Tiritando"	2018	none	Re Loca (Soundtrack)
"Acapulco"	2019	Roberto Kel Torres	none
