= Yo soy Gilda: amar es un milagro =

Upcoming Argentine biographical drama streaming television series

- Genre: Biographical; Musical; Drama
- Directed by: Benjamín Ávila
- Country of origin: Argentina
- Original language: Spanish

Production
- Production company: Habitación 1520

Original release
- Network: Netflix

Yo soy Gilda: amar es un milagro, also known as Gilda: The Series (English title: I Am Gilda: Love Is a Miracle), is an upcoming Argentine biographical series based on the life of Argentinian singer Gilda. The series is produced by Habitación 1520, the same producer who made the film Gilda, no me arrepiento de este amor (English title: I'm Gilda).

The series was scheduled to be released in 2019; but it did not happen. The series is based on the life of Argentine singer Gilda, starring Brenda Asnicar in the lead role. The series is directed by Benjamín Ávila, director of Clandestine Childhood (2012), a film that represented the Argentine singer for the Oscar Awards and nominated for the Goya Awards.

== Synopsis ==
Gilda was a popular Argentine singer of the 1990s, who died at thirty-four in a car accident. The series tells her path to achieve her dreams and singing for everyone. To do this, she will travel a path that few people will cheer up.

== Cast ==
- Brenda Asnicar as Gilda

== Production ==
=== Development ===
In 2018, it was reported that Netflix is developing a biographical series based on the life of Argentine singer Gilda.
