= Santa Evita =

1995 novel by the Argentine writer Tomás Eloy Martínez

- First edition
- Author: Tomás Eloy Martínez
- Translator: Helen Lane
- Language: Spanish
- Publisher: Seix Barral
- Publication date: 1995
- Publication place: Argentina
- English publication date: 1996
- Pages: 398
- ISBN: 8432207187

Santa Evita is a 1995 novel by Argentine writer Tomás Eloy Martínez. It is the story of the corpse of Argentine political leader Eva Perón, the second wife of Argentine president Juan Perón. The book became a bestseller in Argentina and has been widely translated. It is estimated to have sold over 10 million copies worldwide, which makes it one of the best-selling books of all time.

== Plot ==
In a blend of fact and fiction, the story tracks Argentine first lady Eva Perón's perfectly embalmed corpse after her death from cancer at age 33, including how it was seized by the Argentine Military, following the ouster of her husband in 1955. At that time, the corpse was considered a sacred relic, and while army officials wanted to keep it out of the hands of the Peronism political movement, they also considered the consequences of destroying it.

== Reception ==
Michiko Kakutani of The New York Times wrote that since Eva Perón's life seems perfectly suited for the author's "hallucinatory brand of fiction", "it's a pity the novel isn't better. Although Mr. Martinez's narrative is enlivened by some magical and highly perverse set pieces, though it possesses moments that genuinely illuminate the bizarre intersection of history, gossip and legend, the novel as a whole feels leaden and earthbound. In the end, it gives the reader neither a visceral sense of Evita's life nor an understanding of the powerful hold she has exerted on her country's imagination."

== TV adaptation ==
In 2022, it was adapted into a miniseries produced by Salma Hayek and starring Natalia Oreiro.

== See also ==
- 1995 in literature
- Argentine literature
- List of best-selling books
