= My First Wedding =

My First Wedding can refer to:

- My First Wedding (2006 film), a 2006 American film
- My First Wedding (2011 film), a 2011 Argentine film
