= No Kids =

No Kids may refer to:

- No Kids (band), Canadian indie pop band
- No Kids (film), Argentine film
