= Ricardo Mollo =

Argentine musician, producer and singer (born 1957)

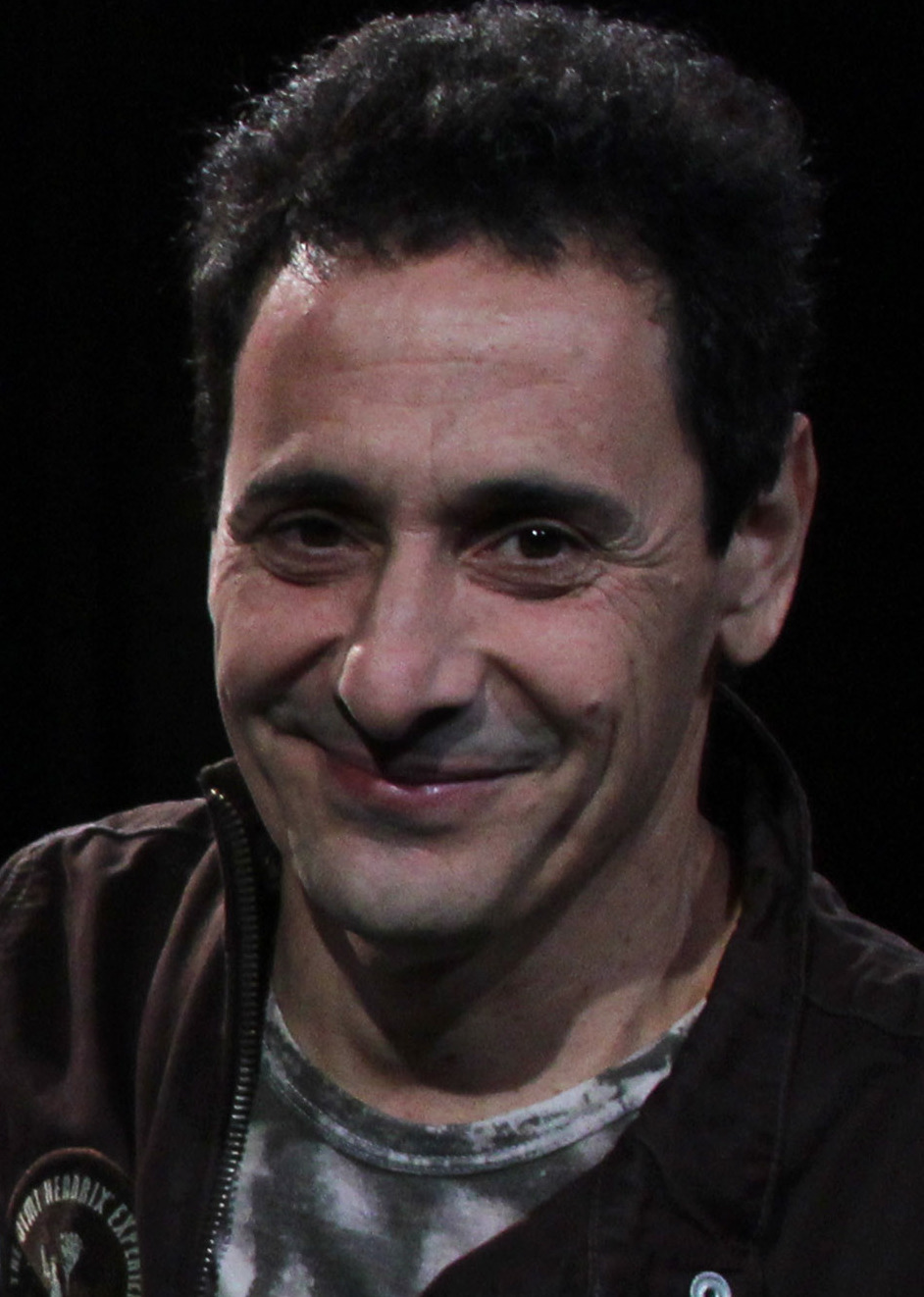
- Mollo at an Argentine talkshow in 2014
- Born: Ricardo Jorge Mollo; 17 August 1957 (age 69); Province of Buenos Aires, Argentina
- Occupation: Musician • Producer • Songwriter
- Years active: 1976 – Present
- Agent: CBS Records • PolyGram • Sony Music Entertainment
- Notable work: Divididos • Sumo
- Spouse: Natalia Oreiro (m. 2002)
- Partner: Érica García (1989–1999)
- Children: 3
- Relatives: Omar Mollo (brother)

Ricardo Jorge Mollo (born August 17, 1957) is an Argentine musician, producer, singer and composer. Mollo is best known as the guitarist for Sumo from 1984 until the band's dissolution after Luca Prodan's death in 1987 and, shortly thereafter, a co-founder of Divididos. His work and guitar skills has been considered highly influential in the development of Argentine rock during the 1970s and 1980s.

== Early life ==
Ricardo Jorge Mollo was born in the Pergamino neighbourhood of Buenos Aires, Argentina on 17 August 1957, but moved to El Palomar early in his life. He is the younger brother of Omar Mollo, who would be later on a co-founder of the Argentine hard rock band MAM, and taught Mollo his first chords when they lived in El Palomar.

Mollo's passion for the guitar first started when a friend, at the age of thirteen, introduced him to the works of Jimi Hendrix. Mollo was enchanted by his music and would later try to follow his musical style. Mollo said in an interview, "It's impressive how he played the guitar without the effects that exist today."

== Career ==
Mollo came to receive international recognition in the 1980s as the guitarist of Sumo, with whom he released four studio albums until 1987. After Sumo dissolved, with fellow-bandmate bassist Diego Arnedo, Mollo formed the band Divididos.

Mollo is known for his virtuosity on the guitar, and particularly for his version of "Voodoo Child" by Jimi Hendrix, which he has played on his guitar using his teeth or objects thrown by the public including carrots, slippers, sandals, tennis balls, or canes for the blind.

Besides his work as a musician, he is a producer and has collaborated with several Latin American artists including Cuca, León Gieco, Charly García, Gustavo Cerati, Los Piojos, Las Pelotas, La Renga, and Luis Alberto Spinetta.

== Personal life ==
He was in a relationship with the singer Érica García between 1989 and 1999. In 2002, he married Uruguayan actress Natalia Oreiro, with whom he had a son in 2012.

== Discography ==
=== Sumo ===
- Divididos por la Felicidad (1985)
- Llegando los Monos (1986)
- After Chabón (1987)

=== Divididos ===
- 40 dibujos ahí en el piso (1989)
- Acariciando lo áspero (1991)
- La era de la boludez (1993)
- Otro le travaladna (1995)
- Divididos (1996)
- Gol de mujer (1998)
- 10 (1999)
- Narigón del siglo (2000)
- Viveza criolla (2000)
- Vengo del placard de otro (2002)
- Vivo Acá (2003)
- Amapola del 66 (2010)
- Audio y agua (2011)
