= Diego Peretti =

Argentine actor, screenwriter, and psychiatrist (born 1963)

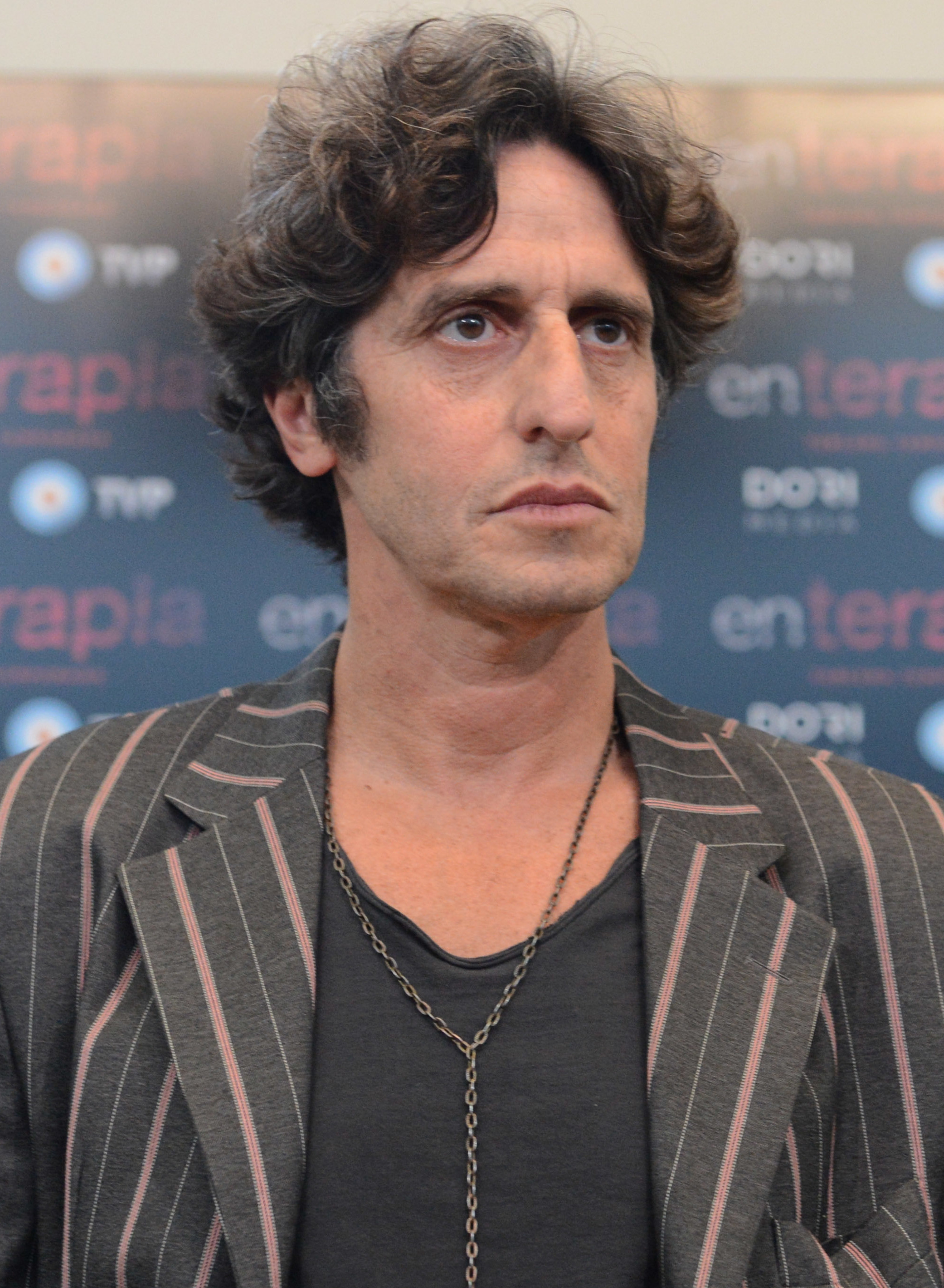
- Peretti in 2014
- Born: 10 February 1963 (age 63); Buenos Aires, Argentina
- Occupations: Actor; screenwriter; psychiatrist

Diego Peretti (born 10 February 1963) is an Argentine actor, screenwriter and former psychiatrist.

== Life and career ==
Born in Buenos Aires on 10 February 1963 and raised in the neighbourhood of Constitución, Peretti was the son of immigrants to Argentina (an Italian school teacher on physics and maths and a Spanish clothier). He studied at the Colegio Nacional de Buenos Aires and the Medical School of the UBA, after which he completed a four-year residency to train as a psychiatrist at the Hospital Castex in San Martín. In his youth, he was a member of the Intransigent Party.

He practised as a psychiatrist for fourteen years. Peretti started his acting film career with an appearance in El sueño de los héroes. He took part in several movies and TV series, including the 2004 romantic comedy No sos vos, soy yo, and his most famous rol as Emilio Ravenna in the satire Los Simuladores a popular TV series aired on Telefé. He starred opposite Carolina Peleritti in ¿Quién dice que es fácil?, and, drawing on his background in psychiatry for a number of roles, has starred in a number of crime dramas, including Bottom of the Sea (The Bottom of the Ocean, 2004), Wakolda (2013), The Heist of the Century (2020), Tiempo de Valientes (A Time for Valor, 2005), and La Señal (The Signal, 2007).

In 2012, he starred in a show named En terapia, which was the local adaptation of In Treatment aired on TV Pública, the public channel managed by the National Government.

== Filmography ==
=== Film ===
- El sueño de los héroes (1997)
- Punto muerto (short subject - 1998)
- Cohen vs. Rosi (1998)
- Mala época (1998)
- Los últimos días (1999)
- Alma Mía (1999)
- Los Pintín al rescate (2000)
- Taxi, un encuentro (2001)
- El Fondo del Mar (2003)
- No sos vos, soy yo (2004)
- Tiempo de Valientes (2005)
- ¿Quién dice que es fácil? (2007)
- La Señal (2007)
- Música en espera (2009)
- Al final del camino (2009)
- Un amor (2011)
- Maktub (2011)
- En fuera de juego (2011)
- La reconstrucción (2013)
- Wakolda (2013)
- Papeles en el viento (2015)
- Showroom (2015)
- No Kids (2015)
- Mecánica popular (2016)
- The Night My Mother Killed My Father (2016)
- Casi leyendas (2017)
- Ten Days Without Mom (2017)
- Re loca (2018)
- Initials SG (2019)
- The Heist of the Century (2020)
- La noche mágica (2021)
- Ecos de un crimen (2022)
- La ira de Dios (2022)
- Doble discurso (2023)

=== Television ===
- Poliladron (1994)
- R.R.D.T (1997)
- Gasoleros (1998)
- Champions of Life (1999)
- Culpables (2001)
- Máximo corazón (2002)
- Los Simuladores (2003)
- Locas de amor (2003)
- Botines (2005)
- Criminal (2005)
- El hombre que volvió de la muerte (2007)
- En terapia (2012-2014)
- El reino (2021)

== Awards ==
=== Nominations ===
- 2013 Martín Fierro Awards
  - Best actor of miniseries

== Personal life ==
He has a daughter, actress Mora Peretti, who was conceived with his wife Natalia.
