= Super Crazy (film) =

Re loca
- Theatrical release poster
- Directed by: Martino Zaidelis
- Written by: Andrés Aloi; Martino Zaidelis; Sebastián De Caro
- Produced by: Sebastian Aloi; Miguel Asensio Llamas; Muriel Cabeza; Ignacio García Cucucovich; Andy Kleinman; Axel Kuschevatzky; Patricio Rabuffetti; Angel Sala; Fernando Stamati; Matías Tamborenea
- Starring: Natalia Oreiro
- Cinematography: Lucio Bonelli
- Edited by: Cristina Carrasco Hernández; Martino Zaidelis
- Music by: Emilio Kauderer
- Production companies: Aeroplano Cine; Telefé
- Distributed by: Paramount Pictures (through United International Pictures)
- Release date: July 5, 2018
- Running time: 84 minutes
- Countries: Argentina; Uruguay
- Language: Spanish
- Box office: $2,802,383

Super Crazy (Spanish: Re loca) is a 2018 Argentine-Uruguayan comedy film directed by Martino Zaidelis (in his directorial debut) and written by Zaidelis, Andrés Aloi & Sebastián De Caro. It is a remake of the 2016 Chilean film No Filter. Starring Natalia Oreiro. It was released on July 5, 2018, in Argentine and Uruguayan theaters.

== Plot ==
Pilar (Natalia Oreiro) lives in an apartment in Buenos Aires with her not-very dedicated husband Javier (Fernán Mirás) and her adolescent and irresponsible stepson, Nicolás (Lucas Pose), works as an agent creative in an advertising agency and will soon be forty years old. Pilar leads a monotonous and exhausting life, which usually improves a bit when she talks to her ex-boyfriend Pablo (Diego Torres). However, Pablo is about to marry Sofía (Gimena Accardi), who hates Pilar. Her neighbor, Guillermo (Walter Cornás) throws loud parties all the time, and her stepson doesn't go to school and spends all day bringing friends into his apartment. Her best friend Valeria (Pilar Gamboa) ignores her problems and doesn't listen to her because she keeps an eye on her phone.

At work, her boss, Alejandro (Agustín Aristarán) considers that Pilar is outdated to the world of social media and hires the young influencer Maia (Malena Sánchez) to work with her to relaunch the advertising campaign that was the most successful of Pilar's career fifteen years ago. Maia annoys Pilar by taking her place in the company parking lot and later humiliates her during a labor meeting by upstaging her and nullifying her proposals. After this, Pilar emotionally collapses when her car is impounded for being improperly parked. Although Pablo agrees to help her by taking her to the bar where he works, Sofía takes the opportunity to demand that Pilar stay away from her fiancé. While returning home depressed, Pilar meets Fernando Salaberry (Hugo Arana), an old man who is doing an "exercise to purify his soul" next to a bridge. Salaberry listens to her problems and tells her about a ritual she can perform to wake up the next day a completely different person, facing her problems.

Indeed, Pilar performs the ritual and wakes up being a carefree and direct person. She tells Javier what she thinks, breaks the window of Maia's car when she parks it back in her place, has a heated argument with Alejandro, and finally quits her job after forcing him to apologize for the treatment she has received from him. After meeting Pablo and Sofía, she insults her and flirts with Pablo in front of her. In a later meeting with Valeria, she destroys her phone in retaliation for not paying attention to her. Upon returning home, she forces the gas company employee to fix her hot water and violently expels Javier and Nicolás from her apartment after finding the latter filming a pornographic film in his room. She savagely beats a taxi driver for assaulting her on the street and then rebuffs Maia, who was trying to convince her to work together after a video footage of said attack was made viral.

However, the peace found by Pilar after her release is broken when her direct attitude begins to cause her problems. After confessing to Pablo that she still loves him, she severely reproaches him for having left her at the instigation of her mother and now wanting to marry Sofía, a very similar controlling woman, using hurtful words and terms that seriously damage their friendship. She also quarrels with her sister after letting her sister's cat, whom she had promised to take care of, die. Returning to her apartment, she burns down and destroys his neighbor's car in response to his refusal to end one of his parties, ending up spending the night in jail.

The next day, she locates Salaberry and seeks him to help her return to the way she was before. But the old man tells her that he hasn't done anything, that Pilar has everything in her head, being able to control her impulses whenever and however she wants. After Maia tries to convince her to work together with another viral video, Pilar suggests that she can be her assistant. After that, she makes peace with her sister by giving her an adopted cat. In her apartment, Javier and Nicolás sincerely try to reconcile with her and, although Pilar appreciates their apologies, she ultimately decides that they should end their relationship on good terms. Finally, she decides to go to Sofía and Pablo's wedding, ready to fix things with the latter. During the ceremony, she notices that Sofía has controlled the entire organization, not accepting any of Pablo's ideas, although Pilar admits that her ex-boyfriend seems happy anyway. Deciding that she does not have to participate in the event, Pilar leaves the place alone. The film ends with Pilar driving, listening to the radio, and laughing wildly.

== Cast ==
The actors participating in this film are:

- Natalia Oreiro as Pilar
- Diego Torres as Pablo
- Fernán Mirás as Javier
- Pilar Gamboa as Valeria
- Gimena Accardi as Sofía
- Hugo Arana as Fernando Salaberry
- Diego Peretti as Psychoanalyst
- Agustín Aristarán as Alejandro
- Malena Sánchez as Maia
- Walter Cornás as Guillermo
- Valeria Lois as Isabel
- Martín Garabal as Toto
- Lucas Pose as Nicolás
- Dario Guersenzvaig as Sergio
- Santiago Korovsky as Cameraman
- Jonathan Nugnes as Party boy
- Ale Dambrosio as Receptionist
- Suyai Chiodi as Rapper
- Santiago Rovito as Rapper
- Pedro Risi as Salaberry's Student
- José Mehrez as Gasman
- Emiliano Salamanca as Cloth
- Beatriz Rajland as Olga

== Reception ==
=== Critical reception ===
The film received mixed reviews, though generally positive. According to the Todas Las Críticas portal, the film starring Natalia Oreiro obtained 59% positive reviews with an estimated average of 60/100 based on 32 ratings from the press.

=== Commercial reception ===
After the precedent of the previous year with Mamá se fue de viaje and its unexpected commercial success in the same winter period, it was expected that the film would behave in a similar way, attracting the public target little interested in "blockbuster" movies, as is. It happened with the aforementioned Ariel Winograd tape. On its first day in theaters, the film drew 21,000 viewers, effectively achieving numbers similar to the opening day of Mamá se fue de viaje. After its first weekend on the billboard, the film had managed to cut 154,000 tickets, ranking 5th among the most viewed in the school recess season. Already in its second weekend, the film remained in the same position with a slight drop in attendance, bringing 101,000 people to theaters. By the third weekend, the film had dropped one position, this time reaching the 6th position among the most viewed, maintaining a good performance of 81,000 viewers.

The cumulative to date is 731,424 viewers according to the consulting firm UltraCine, being one of the most viewed Argentine films of the year in that country, thus surpassing Animal as the most viewed Argentine film of the first semester.
