= Tu Veneno (song) =

2000 song by Natalia Oreiro

Single by Natalia Oreiro

from the album Tu Veneno
- English title: "Your Poison"
- Released: 2000
- Genre: Latin pop, electronic
- Length: 3:00
- Label: Sony BMG Ariola Argentina
- Songwriter: Fernando López Rossi
- Producer: Pablo Durand

Natalia Oreiro singles chronology
"Me Muero De Amor" (1999)	"Tu Veneno" (2000)	"Basta De Ti" (2000)

Music video
- "Tu Veneno" on YouTube

"Tu Veneno" is a song by Uruguayan singer Natalia Oreiro, the song was written by Fernando López Rossi, taken from her second studio album of the same name (2000). It was released on 26 June 2000, by BMG Ariola Argentina as the lead single from the album.

== Commercial performance ==
The single immediately became the number one song on the prestigious Billboard Latino chart. The song reached the Argentine Singles TOP 100 Chart on 9 July 2000 and started in 17th place. Immediately the week after she jumped to first place. The song remained on the charts for an incredible 36 weeks, until 4 March 2001 being considered one of her biggest hits in Argentina. The single has also become a big hit in Spain and in most countries in Eastern Europe.

== Music video ==
The first music video and promotion of the Tu Veneno CD, which hit television in June 2000. The music video was shot in studios in Los Angeles by American directors Aaron White and Joe Russo. Oreiro wanted to have her own band in the video and wanted the video to be full of cuts. She also fulfilled her dream a bit, to become the heroine of a comic book, because the story of the comic book heroine Oreiro fighting against evil is intertwined in the video clip. The whole clip, like the song, is carried at a brisk pace. In the video, Oreiro proved to be a sexy wamp with a new image inspired by the American model Betty Page.

"Tu Veneno" was nominated for the Argentine Gardel Music Awards 2001, she was nominated for Mejor Video.

== Charts ==
Chart performance for "Tu Veneno"
Chart (2000)	Peak position
Spain (Promusicae)	7
US Tropical Airplay (Billboard)	23
US Latin Pop Airplay (Billboard)	26
