= Santa Evita (TV series) =

2022 Argentinian television series

Santa Evita is an Argentine drama streaming television series, based on the novel of the same name, written in 1995 by Tomás Eloy Martínez.

It was distributed Star+ in Latin America, and by Hulu in United States and Europe. The series follows the last days of the life of Eva Perón, the disappeared embalmed corpse and the military dictatorship trying to stop the cult around her figure. It was released on 26 July 2022. The cast is composed of Natalia Oreiro, Ernesto Alterio, Darío Grandinetti and Francesc Orella.

On Rotten Tomatoes, the miniseries has a Fresh rating of 100%, based on 7 critics' reviews.
