= La era de la boludez =

La Era De La Boludez

Studio album by Divididos
- Released: 1993
- Genre: Hard rock, Psychedelic rock, Argentine rock
- Length: 51:23
- Label: PolyGram Discos
- Producer: Gustavo Santaolalla

Divididos chronology
Acariciando lo áspero (1991)	La Era De La Boludez (1993)	Otro le travaladna (1995)

La era de la boludez [Age of stupidity] is a studio album released in 1993 by Argentine rock band Divididos. It contains a lot of the most famous songs by the group, as "El arriero" (original by Atahualpa Yupanqui), "¿Qué ves?" and "Salir a comprar". It is the best-selling album of Divididos, selling over 480,000 copies.

In 2007, the Argentine edition of Rolling Stone ranked it seventh on its list of "The 100 Greatest Albums of National Rock".

== Track listing ==
1. Salir a Asustar [Go Out To Scare]
2. Ortega y Gases [Wordplay on Spanish philosopher Ortega y Gasset's last name and the word gases (farts)]
3. El Arriero (original by Atahualpa Yupanqui) [The Muleteer]
4. Salir a Comprar [Go Out To Buy]
5. ¿Qué Ves? [What Do You See?]
6. Pestaña de Camello [Camel Eyelash]
7. Rasputín/Hey Jude
8. Dame un Limón [Give Me A Lemon]
9. Paisano de Hurlingham [Hurlingham Dude]
10. Cristófolo Cacarnú
11. Indio Dejá el Mezcal [Indian, quit consuming mezcal]
12. Huelga de Amores [Loves On Strike]
13. Tajo C [literally: Slash C, but it sounds as a colloquial way of asking Is José there?]
14. Pestaña de Camello [Camel Eyelash]

== Personnel ==
- Photography - Alejandra Palacios
- Graphic Design - Alicia Murlender
- Recording Equipment - Andy Brauer
- Hammond Organ, Producer, Vibraphone - Anibal Kerpel
- Composer - Atahualpa Yupanqui
- Trombone - Bruce Fowler
- Engineer - Craig Porteils
- Assistant - Danny Alonso
- Composer - Diego Arnedo
- Primary Artist - Divididos
- Engineer - Doug Schwarz
- Assistant - Gabriel Sutter
- Charango, Composer, Coro, Percussion, Producer - Gustavo Santaolalla
- Composer - John Lennon
- Percussion - Luis Conte
- Cello - Melissa Hasin
- Composer - Paul McCartney
- Composer - Ricardo Mollo
- Engineer - Tony Peluso

== Sales ==
Region	Certification	Certified units/sales
Argentina	—	165,000
