= Natalia Oreiro =

Uruguayan actress and singer (born 1977)

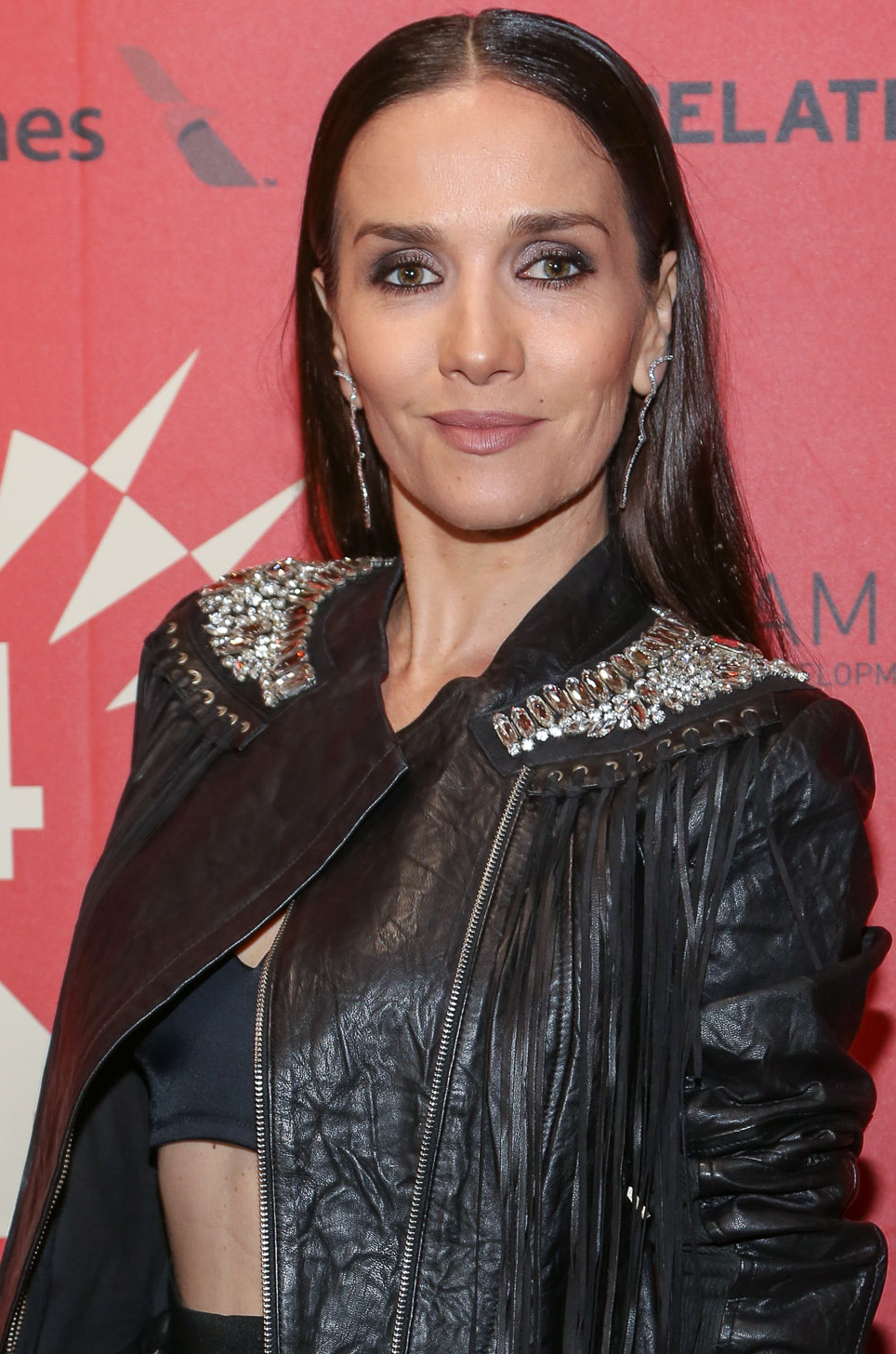
- Natalia Oreiro in 2017
- Born: Natalia Marisa Oreiro Iglesias; 19 May 1977 (age 49); Montevideo, Uruguay
- Citizenship: Uruguay; Spain; Argentina; Russia
- Occupations: Singer; songwriter; actress; model
- Years active: 1994–present
- Spouse: Ricardo Mollo (m. 2001)
- Children: 1
- Musical career
- Genres: Latin pop; rock
- Instruments: Vocals; guitar
- Labels: BMG; Ariola; Warner
- Website: nataliaoreiro.com

Natalia Marisa Oreiro Iglesias (Spanish pronunciation: [naˈtalja oˈɾejɾo]; born 19 May 1977) is a Uruguayan actress, singer, songwriter, model, television presenter and fashion designer. She began her career in telenovelas but since 2008 she has switched to work primarily in films. Oreiro has worked on social awareness shows and events for organizations like Greenpeace and UNICEF, the latter of which designated her as ambassador for Argentina and Uruguay in September 2011.

Her starring role as Milagros Espósito on Muñeca Brava (1998–99) brought her widespread international fame, particularly in Central and Eastern Europe, the former Soviet republics, and Israel, where her popularity endured following the telenovela’s run, which has been rebroadcast multiple times. She has also embarked on several tours and special performances in these regions. The term "Oreiromania" was coined to describe the fan frenzy surrounding her. She has been featured in Esquire magazine's "The Sexiest Woman Alive" list.

As a film actress, Oreiro debuted with a starring role in An Argentinian in New York (1998) and went on to receive a Silver Condor nomination for the comedy-drama Music on Hold (2009). She solidified her status as a leading lady with the historical dramas Clandestine Childhood (2011) and The German Doctor (2013), both of which were shortlisted for the Academy Awards, as well as the comedy-drama Miss Tacuarembó (2010) and the romantic comedies My First Wedding (2011) and Super Crazy (2018). She has also starred in films such as I'm Gilda (2015), Expiration Date (2023), and The Woman in Line (2025).

As a singer, Oreiro has released three studio albums, eight soundtracks for film and television, and twenty-one singles (including three as a featured artist). Selling over 10 million records worldwide, she has been nominated for the MTV Video Music Awards and the Latin Grammy Awards. She has also expanded into television hosting, presenting reality series such as Got Talent Uruguay (2020–2022), La Voz Uruguay (2022–2023) and ¿Quién es la Máscara? Argentina (2022).

== Early life ==
Natalia Oreiro was born on May 19, 1977 in Montevideo, to Carlos Florencio Oreiro Poggio and Mabel Cristina Iglesias Bourié. She is of Spanish and Italian descent and has an older sister Adriana. In 1986 her family moved to Málaga, Spain, where they lived for two years, before returning to Uruguay. She attended elementary schools No. 30 and No. 40 in the Villa del Cerro neighborhood of Montevideo. She began studying drama at the age of eight, and auditioning for advertising campaigns at twelve. During her teens she appeared in more than 30 television commercials for such trademarks as Coca-Cola, Pepsi, and Johnson & Johnson.

== Career ==
=== 1995–2000: Career beginnings ===
At the age of 16 she moved to Buenos Aires, Argentina where she began auditioning to unleash her ambition to be a star. In 1993 she won the children's contest El Show de Xuxa and became the "super paquita" (entertainer and assistant) of the program and representative of its presenter Xuxa in different Latin American countries. She worked as an MTV VJ and in 1995, she landed a minor role in El Nueve's soap opera Dulce Ana. In 1996 she was cast in El Nueve's telenovela 90-60-90 modelos as Lucía, and made her stage debut in the Leonard Gershe's Butterflies Are Free. In 1997 she obtained her first leading role, playing Valeria García Méndez de Salerno in the soap opera Ricos y Famosos.

She starred in the Argentinian film Un Argentino en New York (1998). After the movie, Natalia launched her first album, Natalia Oreiro and the single "Cambio Dolor" became the opening theme for her next acting project, the prime time show Muñeca Brava (1998–1999). For her performance in Muñeca Brava, Natalia was nominated twice (1998 and 1999) for a Martín Fierro Award as Best Actress in a leading role. In 1998, Natalia Oreiro recorded the theme "Paths of the Soul" next to Kennedy Choir and with more than 120 Argentine artists under the direction of Instrumental pianist and conductor Nazareno Andorno.

In January 2000, Natalia was named "Celebrity of the Century" by E! Entertainment Television. She became popular in Russia and Israel due to the success of Muñeca Brava in that country and was even invited to star in a Russian telenovela. In Israel, she performed many times on big stages and many television shows and won the Best Telenovela Actress Award and Best Theme Song "Cambio Dolor" at the "VIVA 2000" awards, 2002 Israeli Cable TV had a live competition for finding the Israeli Natalia Oreiro, and she was the guest of honor for the evening.

=== 2000–2005: Tu Veneno and Turmalina ===
She pursued her musical career with the next album Tu Veneno and presentations at Gala de la Hispanidad, Gala de Murcia (both in Spain) and Festival de la Calle 8 in Miami. Her most important appearance was in the prestigious Latin television show Sábado Gigante Internacional, hosted by Don Francisco. Natalia's major achievement at this time was her music performance in Chile at Viña del Mar Festival 2000 for which she was crowned Queen of that event. The album scored a Latin Grammy nomination for Best Female Pop Vocal Album, but lost to Christina Aguilera's Mi Reflejo.

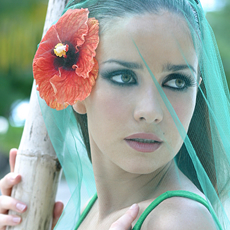
Oreiro in 2005

On 1 June 2002, her third studio album Turmalina was released by BMG Ariola Argentina. Turmalina was produced by Latin record producer Kike Santander and is a combination of styles such as rock, pop and 50's and 60's sounds. On this album, Oreiro wrote and composed the songs: "Alas De Libertad" which is inspired by kids she met some time ago in the city of Jujuy, Argentina; "Mar" tells the love story between a sailor and his girlfriend. Natalia also contributed to the lyrics of "Cayendo". "Que Digan Lo Que Quieran" is Turmalina's first single. The official Uruguayan 2002 World Cup song "Pasión Celeste" is recorded with Fredy Bessio. "Cuesta arriba, cuesta abajo" was the opening song of the soap opera Kachorra (Runaway Lady). Kachorra ended with a rating lower than 20 points in Argentina.

In March 2003 she started filming her second film Cleopatra together with Norma Aleandro, Leonardo Sbaraglia and Héctor Alterio, under the direction of Eduardo Mignogna, a co-production with Spain. In the middle of 2003, she started a tour for Eastern Europe and Latin America. On 1 March 2004 she started filming El Deseo.

=== 2006–2014: Sos mi vida, switch to cinema and other works ===
In 2006 she joined as the female boxer, Esperanza Munoz, the cast of the telenovela Sos mi vida along with her Muñeca Brava co-star Facundo Arana. It was directed by Rodolfo Antúnez and Jorge Bechara and broadcast by Canal 13. It began broadcasting on 16 January 2006 and ended 9 January 2007. During its broadcast averaged 26.9 points overall rating, and ended as the most watched fictional Argentine television program ever, until it was displaced by the 2009, telenovela Valientes. It was written by Ernesto Korovsky and Sebastian Parrotta, and won four Martín Fierro Awards and three Clarín Awards.

On 30 April 2008, Oreiro starred in Amanda O which was an internet television series in Argentina and produced by Dori Media Group. It was the first soap opera ever made for the internet, and was seen by 550,000 users over Novebox.com, from Argentina, Uruguay and Paraguay during its first season and beginning of the second. Later in 2008 she co-starred in the film Las vidas posibles, along with Germán Palacios and Ana Celentano and got nominated for a Silver Condor for Best Supporting Actress.

In 2009 she starred with Diego Peretti in Música en espera. The film premiered in Buenos Aires in March 2009 and sold 235,000 tickets. During the same year, she visited several international film festivals to present the film Francia directed by Adrián Caetano, including the San Sebastian Film Festival among others.

In 2010 she starred in the film Miss Tacuarembó, a musical comedy, which was co-produced by Uruguay, Argentina and Spain. For her performance, she received the Iris award for Best Actress. Oreiro also participated in the soundtrack of the film, performing all the songs. During the same year, she presented Se dice de mí, a program that sought to raise awareness about women's rights.

During the first half of 2011, she starred with Daniel Hendler in My First Wedding, a film comedy directed by Ariel Winograd.

In 2012 she started in Lynch, a series created in Colombia and broadcast throughout Latin America. The same year the film Clandestine Childhood, which takes place during Argentina's last military dictatorship, premiered in Argentina. The film was selected to compete for a nomination in the Best Foreign Film category at the 2013 Oscar Awards. For her work in this film Oreiro won the Silver Condor Award and the Argentine Academy of Cinematography Arts and Sciences Award for Best Actress. At the end of 2012 she returned on stage and performed in the Superdiscoteca of the 90s Festival, which took place in St. Petersburg, Russia.

During 2013, she starred in the telenovela Solamente vos, which marked her return to television after a 7 year hiatus. For her performance in the series she won awards for Best Comedy Actress in the Tato Awards and Martín Fierro awards. Her next leading role was in the film The German Doctor, which was shot during 2012 in the city of Bariloche, and premiered in September 2013. This film, became the second in Oreiro's career to be shortlisted by the Academy of Arts and Sciences of Argentina to compete for a nomination in the Oscar Awards at the category for Best Foreign Film. She also won awards and nominations for Best Actress in the Condor de Plata awards, Sur awards, and the Unasur Festival. The film was nominated for a Goya Award and presented at several international film festivals.

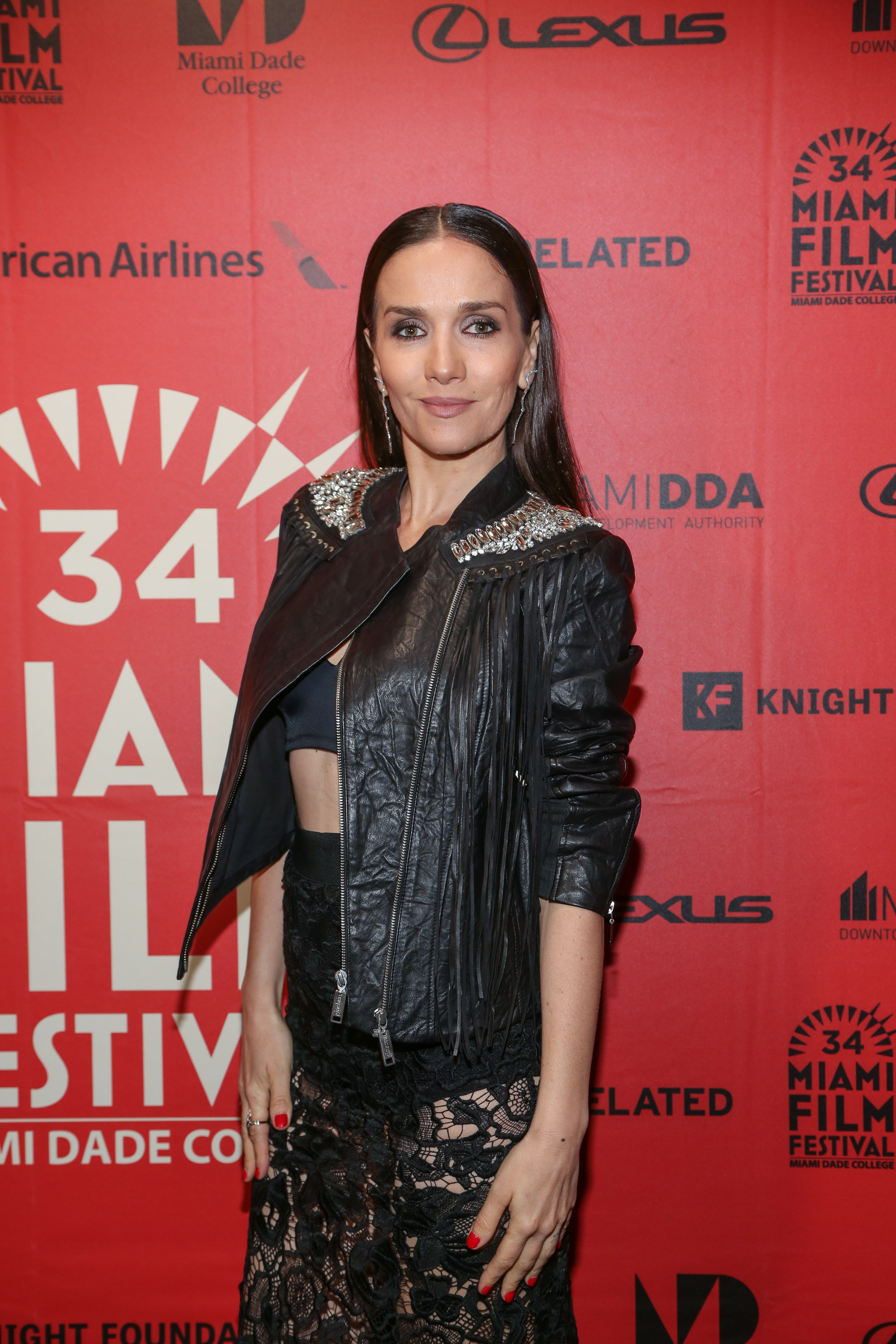
Oreiro at the 2017 Miami International Film Festival showing of I'm Gilda

=== 2014–2017: Nasha Natasha tour, Entre caníbales and I'm Gilda ===
At the end of 2013 she resumed her musical career performing a tour in Eastern Europe called Nasha Natasha Tour Hits (lit. Our Natasha in Russian, from the Russian diminutive form of Natalia). She also released a new song and video clip, a cover of Gloria Trevi's song "Todos me miraran". With the "Nasha Natasha Tour 2014 ", she toured a total of 19 Russian cities making it a total of 34 shows. One of the most important was the one she held at the Olympic Sports Hall in Moscow, which broke a record, as it gathered more than 60 thousand people. She later recorded a new Russian version of "Me muero de amor" («Я умираю от любви»), with a video clip that starred Facundo Arana.

In 2015 she returned to television starring in the dramatic series Entre caníbales, along with Benjamín Vicuña and Joaquín Furriel, and under the direction of Juan José Campanella. The series was broadcast by the Telefe network for Argentina, and by Fox Life for the rest of the Latin American market.

In 2016 she starred in I'm Gilda reaching 953,120 in Argentina's box office, a film based on the life of the Argentinian singer, Gilda, who died in a car accident in September 1996. The soundtrack of the film became the fourth album in her musical career. In December 2016 she presented the first single of the album, the song Corazón Valiente in collaboration with Ruben Rada. The film was presented at several festivals such as the Miami International Film Festival in 2017 and the Malaga Film Festival the same year, and for her performance she won several awards: Sur Award (2016), Audience Platinum for Best Actress (2017) and Condor Award (2017). She has been at the 2016 Platinum Awards as a host and singing "Garota de Ipanema" during the presentation.

=== 2017-2019: Return to the stage, Super Crazy and FIFA World Cup ===
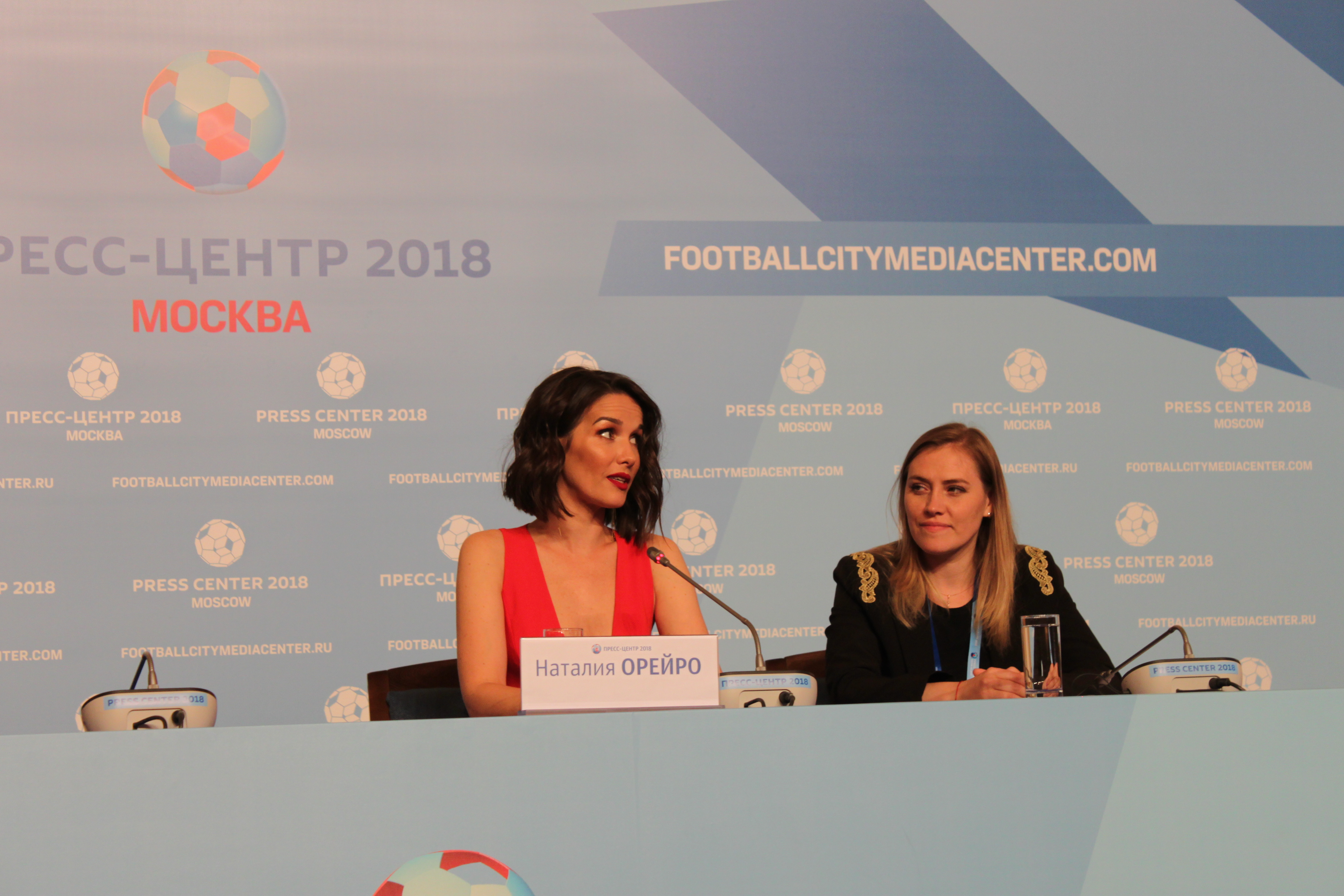
Oreiro in Moscow, May 2018

Her return to music, with the soundtrack of the I'm Gilda film, gave her the opportunity to return to the stage and at the beginning of 2017 she sang at several festivals in Argentina (such as Lincoln, Villa María and Mar del Plata, among others). In Madrid she repeated her role as host of the 2017 Platino Awards (winner of the ''Best Actress'' award from the audience) and the same year she received a Platinum Iris for her career at the 22nd Iris Uruguay Awards.

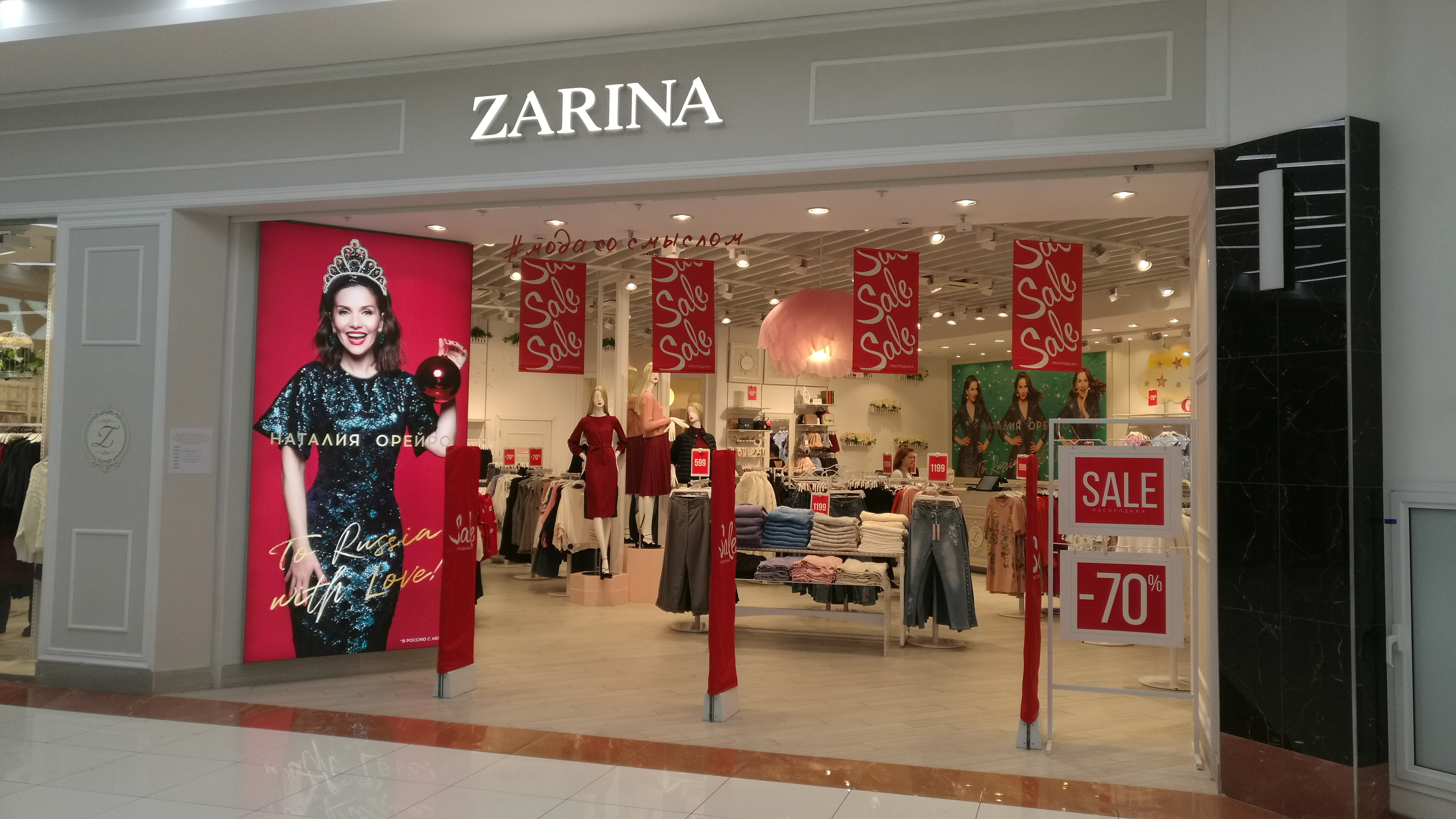
Natalia Oreiro advertising campaign in a Zarina store in Russia, 2019

During 2018, the movie Super Crazy was premiered, which reached 759,546 spectators in Argentina's box office, and she released two songs for the FIFA World Cup held in Russia ("United By Love" was included in the official album of the 2018 FIFA World Cup and the song "Mi Pobedim"). She attended the Kids Choice Awards 2018 (winner of a Lifetime Achievement Award) and the Gramado Festival in Brazil (winner of ''Crystal Kikito''). In 2019, her tour called the "Unforgettable Tour" was launched with 14 concerts in various cities of Russia, Belarus, Moldova and Armenia. A few months later she returned to Russia to attend the ''New Wave Festival'' in Sochi to sing with Roberto Kel Torres the theme ''Acapulco''. In November 2019, the Fort Lauderdale International Film Festival in the United States awarded her with the ''Career Achievement Award'' for her career. In Argentina she appeared in the films "La Noche Mágica" (Bad Christmas) (Gaston Portal's first film) with Diego Peretti and "Las Rojas" (The Broken Land) with Mercedes Moran. The turn of the year found her in Poland singing some of her greatest hits in front of 120,000 spectators.

=== 2020–present: Got Talent, La Voz, Evita and Yosi, the Regretful Spy ===
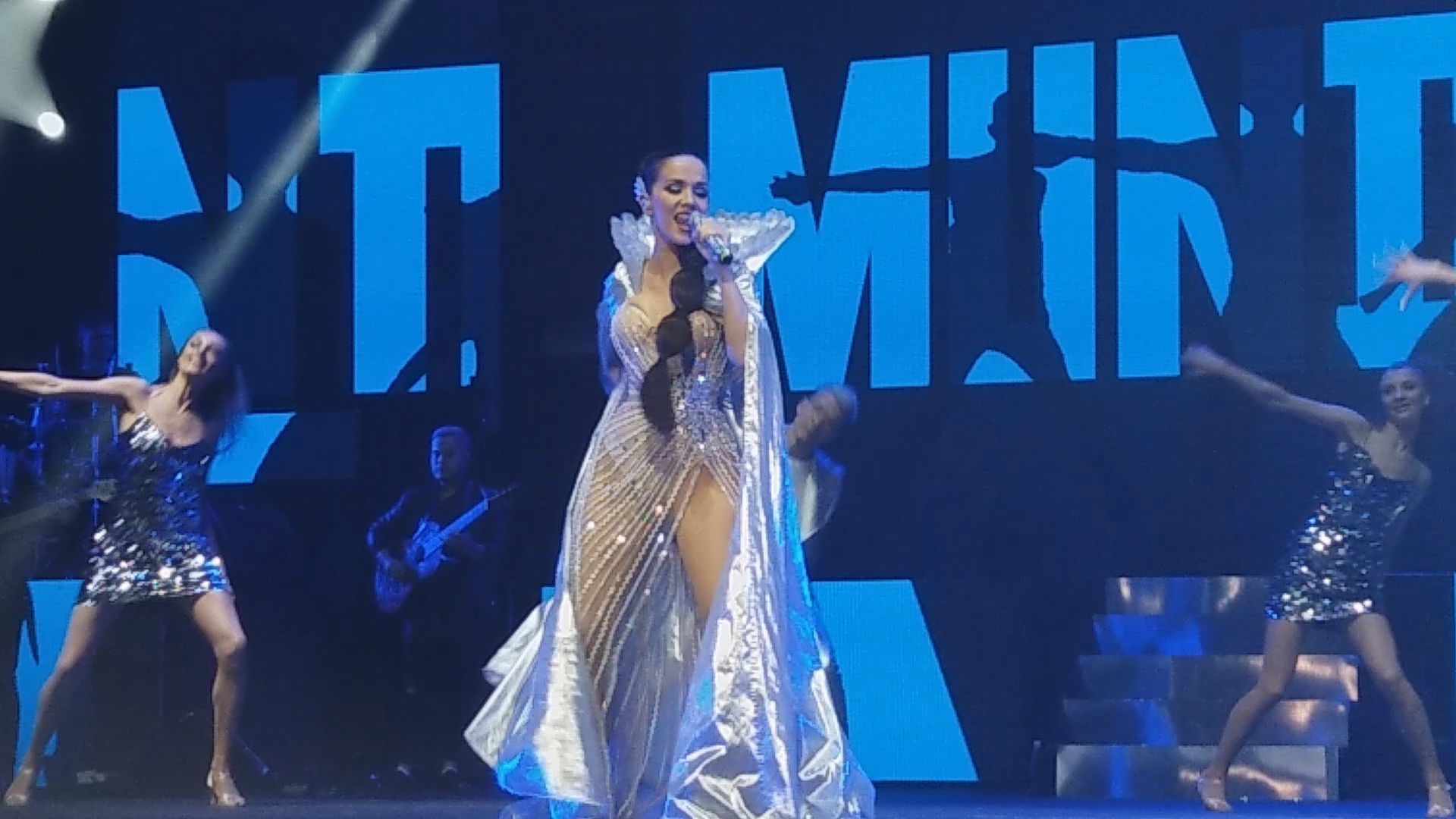
Oreiro during a concert in Chișinău, Moldova in 2019

At the beginning of 2020, she filmed some scenes for the film Hoy Se Arregla El Mundo by Ariel Winogrand with Leonardo Sbaraglia. During the year she hosted Got Talent Uruguay, which was renewed for a second season broadcast in 2021, and a third broadcast in 2022. On 6 August 2020, Netflix premiered Nasha Natasha worldwide. The documentary directed by Martín Sastre, refers to her special bond with Russia, while revealing aspects of her private life that were unknown until then. The documentary reached the top positions in Uruguay, Argentina and several European countries and also reached the 30th position globally.

In 2021, she filmed the first season of the Amazon Prime Video series Yosi, the Regretful Spy, which premiered on 29 April 2022, and follows a spy who infiltrates a Jewish community to gather information that was used to carry out the AMIA bombing. On 17 February 2022, it was officially announced that she would be the host of La Voz, the Uruguayan version of The Voice of Holland. That year the western film Las Rojas was also released, in which she stars alongside Mercedes Morán, and the Star+ series Santa Evita also premiered, in which Oreiro plays Eva Perón.

In July 2023, she continued to host the second season of La Voz, in addition to starring in the premiere of the romantic comedy film Casi muerta, in which she plays a woman who finds out she has a terminal illness.

== Personal life ==
In 2001, Oreiro began a relationship with Argentine singer and musician Ricardo Mollo, best known for his career as member of the rock bands Sumo and Divididos. They secretly married later that year, on 31 December. On 26 January 2012, in a clinic in Buenos Aires, Oreiro gave birth to a boy named Merlín Atahualpa Mollo Oreiro. She and her son received Russian citizenship on 25 October 2021.

She has declared herself as a socialist.

== Discography ==
- Natalia Oreiro (1998)
- Tu Veneno (2000)
- Turmalina (2002)
- Gilda, no me arrepiento de este amor (2016)

== Acting career ==
=== Television ===
Año	Title	Role	Notes
1994	Inconquistable corazón	Victoria	Main role
1995	Dulce Ana	Verónica Iturbe Montalbán	Main role
1996	90-60-90 modelos	Lucía Peralta	Main role
1997	Ricos y Famosos	Valeria García Méndez de Salerno	1 series
1998–1999	Muñeca Brava	Milagros Espósito "La Cholito"	Main role
2002	Kachorra	Antonia Guerrero "Kachorra"/Rosario Achával	Main role
2004	El Deseo	Carmen	Main role
2005	Botines	Renée	1 episode
2006	Sos mi vida	Esperanza "La Monita" Muñoz	Main role
2007	Patito feo	Patricia González	Guest appearance
2008	Amanda O	Amanda O	Main role
2008	Recurso Natural	Herself	Host
2010	Se dice de mi	Herself	Host
2011	Cuando me sonreís	Leonora Bellami	Guest appearance
2012–2013	Lynch	Isabel Reyes alias Mariana	Main role
2013	Solamente Vos	Aurora Andrés	Main role
2015	Entre caníbales	Ángeles Pellegrini/Ariana Mendoza	Main role
2020–2022	Got Talent Uruguay	Herself	Host
2022–2023	La Voz Uruguay	Herself	Host
2022–2023	Yosi, the Regretful Spy	Claudia	Main role
2022	Santa Evita	Eva Perón	Main role
2026	¿Quién es la máscara?	Octopus	Season 5; contestant

=== Filmography ===
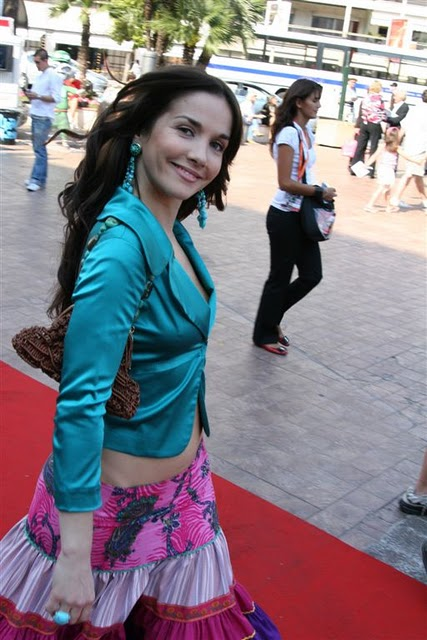
Natalia Oreiro at Cannes in 2007.

Year	Film	Role	Notes
1998	Un Argentino en New York	Verónica 'Vero' De Ricci	
2003	Cleopatra	Sandra / Milagros	
2004	La guerra de los gimnasios (short)	telenovela actress	
2006	La peli	Lola Montero	Won – Festival Cine Argentino de Tandil – Best actress
2008	Las vidas posibles	Marcía Miconi	Nominated – Silver condor – Best Supporting Actress
2008	Música en espera	Paula Otero	Won – Tatu tumpa (Bolivia) – Award for her role in Música en Espera; Nominated – South Awards – Best Actress; Nominated – Silver condor – Best Actress
2010	Francia	Cristina	
2010	Miss Tacuarembó	Natalia "Cristal" / Cándida López	Nominated – Asociación de Críticos de Cine del Uruguay – Best Actress; Won – IRIS (Uruguay) – Best Actress
2011	My First Wedding	Leonora Bellami	
2011	Clandestine Childhood	Cristina	Won – Argentine Academy of Cinematography Arts and Sciences – Best Actress
2013	The German Doctor	Eva	Won – 2nd Unasur Cine International Film Festival Best Actress
2016	I'm Gilda	Gilda	
2017	The Unseen	Dr. Ortega	
2018	Re Loca	Pilar	
2020	Nasha Natasha	Herself	Documentary biographic film
2021	La Noche Magica	Kira Damato	
2022	Hoy Se Arregla El Mundo	Silvina Lasarte	
2022	Las Rojas	Constanza	Nominated – Argentine Film Critics Association – Best Actress
2023	Expiration Date	María	
2024	Campamento con mamá	Patricia Pomiró	
2025	The Woman in Line	Andrea Casamento	

== Tours ==
Year	Name	Number of concerts
2000–2002	Tu Veneno Tour	35 concerts
2003	Tourmalina	10 concerts
2005	Tahití, Haití Tour	3 concerts
2013	Tour Hits	4 concerts
2014	Nasha Natasha Tour	16 concerts
2015	Fiesta Tour (Cancelled)	8 concerts
2016–2017	Cumbia & Hits Tour	13 concerts
2019	Unforgettable Tour	17 concerts
2020	20 Years Together (Cancelled via COVID-19)	13 concerts

== Awards ==
- 2017 Iris Uruguay Awards: Platinum Iris Award
- 2015 Martín Fierro award: Best Actress for Drama Series (for Entre caníbales)
- 2014 Argentinean Film Critics Association Awards as Best Actress for "Wakolda"
- 2013 Argentine Academy of Cinematography Arts and Sciences Awards as Best Actress for "Wakolda"
- 2013 Martín Fierro Awards: Best Lead Actress For a Comedy Series (for Solamente Vos)
- 2013 Tato award as Best Lead Actress in a Comedy Series, for Solamente vos
- 2013 Argentinean Film Critics Association Awards as Best Actress for "Infancia clandestina"
- 2012 Argentine Academy of Cinematography Arts and Sciences Awards as Best Actress for "Infancia clandestina"
- 2006 Martín Fierro Award as Best Lead Actress in a Comedy Series for "Sos mi vida"
- 2000 VIVA's (The Israeli telenovellas channel) "VIVA 2000" Award for Best Actress and Best Theme Song in Muñeca Brava
