= Francia (film) =

- Directed by: Israel Adrián Caetano
- Written by: Israel Adrián Caetano
- Produced by: Gustavo Fito Funes; Reynaldo Peralta Recio
- Cinematography: Julián Apezteguia
- Edited by: Héctor Omar Ester
- Music by: Iván Wyszogrod
- Production companies: Instituto Nacional de Cine y Artes Audiovisuales; La Expresión del Deseo
- Distributed by: Primer Plano Film Group
- Release date: 2009
- Country: Argentina
- Language: Spanish

Francia is a 2009 Argentine film directed by Uruguayan Adrián Caetano, starring Natalia Oreiro.

== Summary ==
Mariana (Milagros Caetano), a young schoolgirl who goes by the name Gloria and always keeps her headphones handy to escape from troubles, shares her outlook on the past and present lives of her parents (played by Natalia Oreiro and Lautaro Delgado). Her parents separated when she was very young. Mariana's father, having moved out of his current partner's apartment, considers the option of renting a room to his ex-wife. Through Mariana's eyes, we observe the underlying tensions between Cristina and Carlos, their personal stories, the unwavering love they have for her, and their determined efforts to overcome challenging financial circumstances.
