= No Kids (film) =

- Directed by: Ariel Winograd
- Starring: Diego Peretti; Maribel Verdú
- Release date: 14 May 2015
- Running time: 90 minutes
- Country: Argentina
- Language: Spanish

No Kids (Spanish: Sin hijos) is a 2015 Argentine comedy film directed by Ariel Winograd. Starring Diego Peretti and Maribel Verdú.

== Cast ==
- Diego Peretti - Gabriel
- Maribel Verdú - Vicky
- Guadalupe Manent - Sofía
- Horacio Fontova
- Martín Piroyansky
- Marina Bellati
- Pablo Rago
