= Amanda O =

- Genre: Comedy
- Starring: Natalia Oreiro; Luciano Castro
- Opening theme: Amando a Amanda O Natalia Oreiro
- Country of origin: Argentina
- Original language: Spanish
- No. of seasons: 2
- No. of episodes: 120

Production
- Producer: Dori Media Group

Original release
- Network: Internet and América 2
- Release: 30 April – 24 December 2008

Amanda O is a comedy, an Internet television series in Argentina produced by Dori Media Group (Dori Media Contenidos). The show features a cast headed by Natalia Oreiro as Amanda O and Luciano Castro as Dante. The show will be on internet at Novebox.com , with a summary on television issued by América 2. It consists of about 120 very short episodes, each approximately eight minutes long. This telenovela has characteristics of a nightmare, dystopia, and science fiction, being drastically different from standard telenovelas, at least approaching serious drama.

Amanda O is the first telenovela made for internet that can also be downloaded on mobile phones and will have a weekly summary on the TV screen.

The programme was seen by 550,000 users over Novebox.com, from Argentina, Uruguay and Paraguay during its first season and beginning of the second.

This series is the second Hispanic TV program dubbed in English language in the Philippines through Q (now GMA News TV), next to Ka Ina, which was dubbed in English through Citynet Television, which was a former subsidiary of GMA Network.

Amanda O won a merit award and was given two nominations in the 2009 Martin Fierro Awards: for Best Comedy Series and for Best Actress in a Comedy Series (Natalia Oreiro). The Merit Award came from The Accolade Competition for Internet Site Streaming indicating exceptional achievement in craft and creativity or standout entertainment or contribution to great social change.

== Cast ==
- Natalia Oreiro as Amanda O.
- Luciano Castro as Dante
- Valeria Lorca as Fake Amanda O.
- Julieta Zylberberg as Ines
- Francisco Napoli as Freddy
- Benjamín Amadeo as Demo
- Fabio Aste as Charly
- Esteban Coletti as Net
