= Divididos =

Argentine rock band

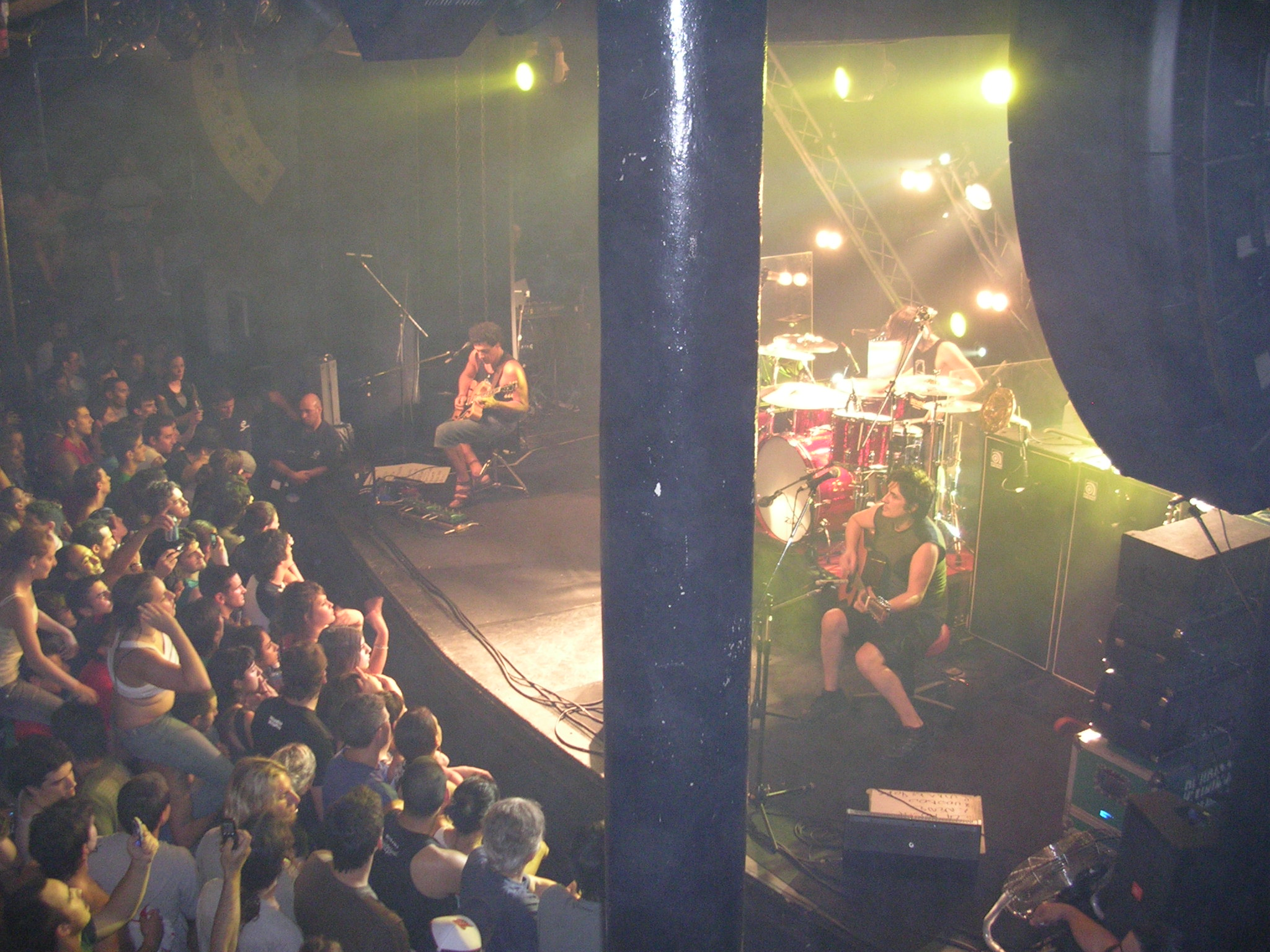
- Divididos in 2006.

Background information
- Origin: Hurlingham, Buenos Aires, Argentina
- Genres: Alternative rock, hard rock
- Years active: 1988–present
- Label: Polygram
- Spinoff of: Sumo
- Members: Ricardo Mollo; Diego Arnedo; Catriel Ciavarella
- Past members: Gustavo Collado; Federico Gil Solá; Jorge Araujo
- Website: www.divididos.com.ar

Divididos ("Divided") is an Argentine rock band. The band was formed in 1988 after the death of Luca Prodan and the consequent dissolution of the band Sumo. Ricardo Mollo (vocals, guitar) and Diego Arnedo (bass guitar) joined drummer Gustavo Collado to form a band named "La División" (The Division), which would later be called "Divididos".

== Biography ==
The group is dubbed La Aplanadora del Rock (The Leveller of Rock) and is known for mixing rock music with Argentine folk music, and cryptic, hard-to-get lyrics. The band started with a mediocre reception on their debut album, 40 dibujos ahí en el piso (40 drawings there on the floor), which featured a new wave-like sound reminiscent of British band Sumo. However, the group soon rose to prominence in the history of Argentine rock with a different album, Acariciando lo áspero (Caressing the rough), released in 1991, and then consolidating further in 1993 with their politically committed album, La era de la boludez (The age of idiocy), and in 1995 with the experimental Otroletravaladna (flesruoykcufog).

Divididos was awarded with the Best Song of the 2000s for "Spaghetti del rock", and with the Best Album of the 2000s for Narigón del siglo, both won in a poll by the users of Rolling Stone Argentina. Furthermore, in 2010, on the list of Best 50 National Songs Of The Decade by a group of critics of Rolling Stone Argentina, "Spaghetti del rock" was awarded with the 5th place and "Par mil" with 21st place.

This consistent record led in 2005 to the award of the band with the Platinum Konex Award as the best Rock Group of the 1995–2005 decade, distinction shared with Patricio Rey y sus Redonditos de Ricota.

Other than founding members Mollo and Arnedo, different drummers have completed the normal trio: Gustavo Collado (1988–1990); Federico Gil Solá (1990–1995); Jorge Araujo (1995–2004); and since 2004, Catriel Ciavarella.

The band has recorded a number of covers, such as Voodoo Child by Jimi Hendrix and Light My Fire by The Doors. Covers not committed to CDs include I Want You (She's So Heavy) and Day Tripper by The Beatles. In their shows, Divididos has played songs such as "Rock and Roll" and "Moby Dick" (Led Zeppelin), and "Little Wing" (Jimi Hendrix). The band also covers some Sumo songs, usually in medley format.

== Discography ==
=== Studio ===
Year	Album	Translated title
1989	40 dibujos ahí en el piso	40 drawings there on the floor
1991	Acariciando lo áspero	Caressing the rough
1993	La era de la boludez	The age of idiocy
1995	Otroletravaladna	Ssaruoyhsawog -The album's title is a backwards spelling of the insult "Andá a lavarte el orto" -"Go wash your ass"
1998	Gol de mujer	Goal of a woman
2000	Narigón del siglo	Big-nosed of the century
2002	Vengo del placard de otro	I come from another one's closet
2010	Amapola del '66	Poppy from the '66
2018	Haciendo cosas raras	Doing weird things

=== Live ===
Year	Album	Translated title
2000	Viveza criolla	Folk smarts
2003	Vivo acá	I live here
2011	Audio y agua	Audio and water
2019	22/12/18 Flores (En vivo)	22/12/18 Flores (Live)

=== Compilation ===
Year	Album	Translated title
1996	Divididos	The Divided Ones
1999	10	
2003	Oro	Gold
2004	Canciones de cuna al palo	Lullabies over the top
2004	Vianda de ayer	Yesterday's lunch
2006	Obras cumbres	Masterpieces

== See also ==
- Official site (in Spanish)
