= Tu Veneno =

Studio album by Natalia Oreiro
- Released: 8 August 2000
- Recorded: 2000; Los Angeles, California; Seville, Spain; Buenos Aires, Argentina
- Genres: Latin pop, electronic, downtempo
- Length: 59:45
- Language: Spanish
- Label: BMG Ariola Argentina
- Producer: Pablo Durand

Natalia Oreiro chronology
Natalia Oreiro (1998)	Tu Veneno (2000)	Natalia Oreiro 2001 (2001)

Professional ratings
Review scores
Source	Rating
Allmusic	link

Tu Veneno is the second studio album by Uruguayan singer and actress Natalia Oreiro.

== Background ==
Natalia Oreiro pursued her music career with her second album, Tu Veneno, and presentations in "Gala de la Hispanidad", "Gala de Murcia" (both in Spain) and "Festival de la Calle 8" in Miami. Her most important appearance was in the prestigious Latin television show Sábado Gigante Internacional, hosted by Don Francisco. Natalia's mayor achievement at this time was her music performance in Chile at the Viña del Mar Festival in 2001, for which she was crowned Queen of that event. The album scored a Latin Grammy nomination for Best Pop Female Vocal Album, but lost to Christina Aguilera's Mi Reflejo. More than 3,600,000 copies of this album was sold worldwide.

== Release ==
The single of the same name as the CD came out in Argentina 26 June 2000. Immediately became a hit number one in the charts. The single was filmed a video clip as a promo on the occasion of the CD. CD Tu veneno published in Argentina 8 August 2000.

== Singles ==
The album's first two singles were Tu Veneno and Basta De Ti which peaked at number 7 and 19 in Spain respectively.

== Track listing ==
No.	Title	Writer(s)	Length
1.	"Tu Veneno"	Fernando López Rossi	3:00
2.	"Río de la Plata"	Facundo Monti	4:32
3.	"Cómo Te Olvido"	Claudia Brant	3:44
4.	"Luna Brava"	Javier Pérez Álvarez	4:13
5.	"Aburrida"	López Rossi	3:40
6.	"Estamos Todos Solos" (We're All Alone Spanish cover)	Boz Scaggs; Rolly Hernández; Natalia Oreiro; López Rossi	3:39
7.	"Gitano Corazón"	Brant; Marcelo Berestovoy	3:05
8.	"Febrero"	Afo Verde; Pablo Durand	4:37
9.	"Dónde Irá"	Verde; Durand	4:59
10.	"Basta de Tí"	Oreiro; López Rossi	3:30
11.	"Mata y Envenena"	López Rossi	4:48
12.	"Si Me Vas a Dar Tu Amor"	López Rossi	4:41
13.	"Que Pena Me Das"	Andrés Calamaro	3:30
14.	"Un Ramito de Violetas" (Cecilia cover)	Evangelina Sobredo	4:31
15.	"Caliente"	Coti Sorokin; Pablo Duchovny	3:30
Total length:			60:00

== Personnel ==
Credits for Tu Veneno adapted from Allmusic:

- Alex Acuña – Guest Artist
- Gustavo Borner – Engineer, Recorder
- Pablo Durand – Arranger, producer
- Benny Faccone – Engineer, Recorder
- Yoad Nevo – Arranger
- Carlos Nieto – Engineer, Recorder
- Natalia Oreiro – Lead vocals
- Diego Ortells – Arranger
- Fernando López Rossi – Composer
- Jess Sutcliffe – Engineer, Recorder

== Official versions and remixes ==
- "Tu Veneno" (Versión Karaoke) (3:00)
- "Tu Veneno" (Remix) (2:33)
- "Basta de Tí" (Radio Dance Remix) (3:20)
- "Basta de Tí" (Extended Dance Remix) (4:17)

== Charts ==
=== Weekly charts ===
Chart (2000–2001)	Peak position
Chilean Albums (IFPI)	7
Czech Albums (IFPI)	9
European Albums (Music & Media)	56
Greece International Albums (IFPI)	2
Hungarian Albums (MAHASZ)	4
Spain Albums (PROMUSICAE)	7

=== Year-end charts ===
Chart (2000)	Peak position
Hungarian Albums Chart	35

Chart (2001)	Peak position
Hungarian Albums Chart	25

== Certifications ==
Region	Certification	Certified units/sales
Argentina (CAPIF)	Gold	30,000^{^}
Czech Republic	Platinum	
Hungary (MAHASZ)	Platinum	20,000
Israel	Gold	
^{^} Shipments figures based on certification alone.

== Release history ==
Region	Date	Label
Argentina	8 August 2000	BMG Ariola Argentina
