= Entre caníbales =

Entre caníbales (Spanish: Among cannibals) is a 2015 Argentine telenovela, starring Natalia Oreiro as Ariana, Benjamín Vicuña as El Pibe Larralde and Benjamín Furriel as Valmora. Danny Pardo as Father Martin, Marcelo Melingo as Lemos Arenal and Gerardo Chendo as Julio Castro.

== Awards ==
- 2015 Martín Fierro Awards
  - Best lead actor of daily fiction (Joaquín Furriel)
  - Best lead actress of daily fiction (Natalia Oreiro)
