= La peli =

The Film
- Directed by: Gustavo Postiglione
- Written by: Gustavo Postiglione
- Produced by: Marcelo Altmark; Claudio Joison
- Starring: Darío Grandinetti; Noelia Campo; Norman Briski; Carlos Resta; Raúl Calandra; Jazmín Stuart
- Cinematography: Héctor Molina
- Release date: March 10, 2007 (Mar del Plata Film Festival)
- Running time: 120 minutes
- Country: Argentina
- Language: Spanish

La Peli (The Film) is a 2007 Argentine film directed by Gustavo Postiglione and starring Darío Grandinetti, Noelia Campo, Norman Briski, Carlos Resta, Raúl Calandra and Jazmín Stuart. It debuted in the 2007 Mar del Plata Film Festival, winning a Best Film nomination. Filming took place in Rosario, Santa Fe.

== Synopsis ==
Diego Simonney (Grandinetti) is a lonely man living by the sea, once a famed film director, thence fallen into decadence and oblivion, having lost control of his movie and, subsequently, his life. Through flashbacks we're shown Simonney's crescent indifference towards the movie he is trying to make, with camera-shy, third-rate actors (Calandra and Stuart) and an even a worse script. He finds redemption in the love for Ana (Campo), an Uruguayan who used to be his student. But passion is extinguished, and obsession takes place as Simonney follows Ana around with his camera, stalking her and her newfound lover, a deputy. Simonney changes shapes, abandoning the film and being taken for dead (he is portrayed by Briski and Resta according to his mood and attitudes). Solitude overtakes him, and he exiles himself to a bar by the sea, retconning with the beginning of the story. The final scene has Ana stepping into Simonney's bar, and after a lengthy tale of lovers lost and passion dead, they recognize each other. The ending finds Simonney abandoning his camera and being forgiven by Ana.

== Themes ==
The movie pays homage to Federico Fellini to a great extent: several references are made to La Dolce Vita and 8½ throughout the film. The protagonist is a frustrated, veteran director with a style of his own that grows weary of fame and show business and seeks refuge in women (one of them in particular, Ana, perhaps a reference to Anita Ekberg from La Dolce Vita). Obsession and melancholy are intermixed with comic relief sequences where Simonney tries to direct his movie with dubious actors (even Fellini's trademark clown makes a cameo during the shooting). Other Fellini references include multiple foreshadowing (the ending included), "intellectual parties" and old movie posters.
