= My First Wedding (2011 film) =

2011 film

- Film poster
- Directed by: Ariel Winograd
- Written by: Patricio Vega
- Starring: Natalia Oreiro; Daniel Hendler
- Cinematography: Félix Monti
- Release date: 1 September 2011
- Running time: 102 minutes
- Country: Argentina
- Language: Spanish

My First Wedding (Spanish: Mi primera boda) is a 2011 Argentine comedy film directed by Ariel Winograd.

== Cast ==
- Natalia Oreiro as Leonora Campos
- Daniel Hendler as Adrián Meier
- Imanol Arias as Miguel Ángel Bernardo
- Pepe Soriano as Lázaro
- Martín Piroyansky as Martín
- Muriel Santa Ana as Inés
- Gabriela Acher as Raquel
- Soledad Silveyra as Marta
- Gino Renni as Raúl
- Marcos Mundstock as Father Patricio
- Daniel Rabinovich as Rabbi Mendl
