= Casi muerta =

- Directed by: Fernán Mirás
- Written by: Fernán Mirás; Beatriz Carbajales; Rodrigo H. Vila
- Produced by: Patricio Rabuffetti; Rodrigo H. Vila
- Starring: Natalia Oreiro
- Cinematography: Daniel Ortega
- Music by: Emilio Kauderer
- Production companies: Cinema 7 Films; Non Stop; Particular Crowd; Montelona Cine
- Distributed by: United International Pictures
- Release date: July 6, 2023
- Running time: 105 minutes
- Countries: Argentina; Uruguay
- Language: Spanish

Expiration Date (Spanish: Casi muerta, lit. 'Almost dead') is a 2023 Argentine-Uruguayan romantic comedy film directed and written by Fernán Mirás. Starring Natalia Oreiro, it is a remake of the 2012 Basque-language Spanish film, Bypass.

== Plot ==
María and Javier have been in the same group of friends for a long time but have been estranged because the latter lives in Montevideo, Uruguay. After María suffers a health breakdown and was announced that she only has one month to live, Javier decides to return to Buenos Aires to meet his old friends. Upon his return, they discover that they have always been in love.

María asks her friend Javier to accompany her in the last 30 days of her life, while he avoids telling her that he has a girlfriend in Uruguay so as not to shock her. Together they try to find meaning in life and death, while their love is reborn.

== Cast ==
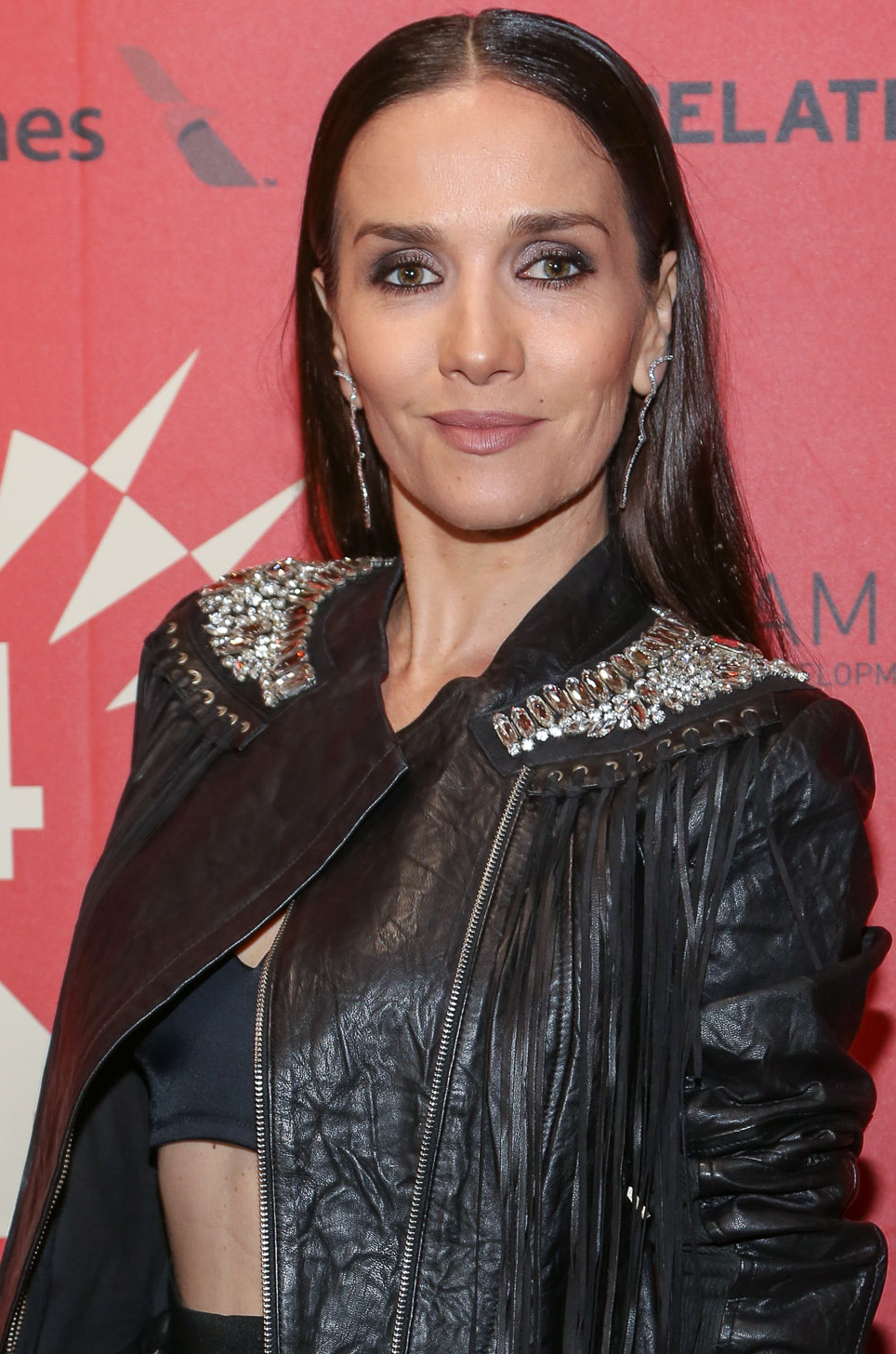
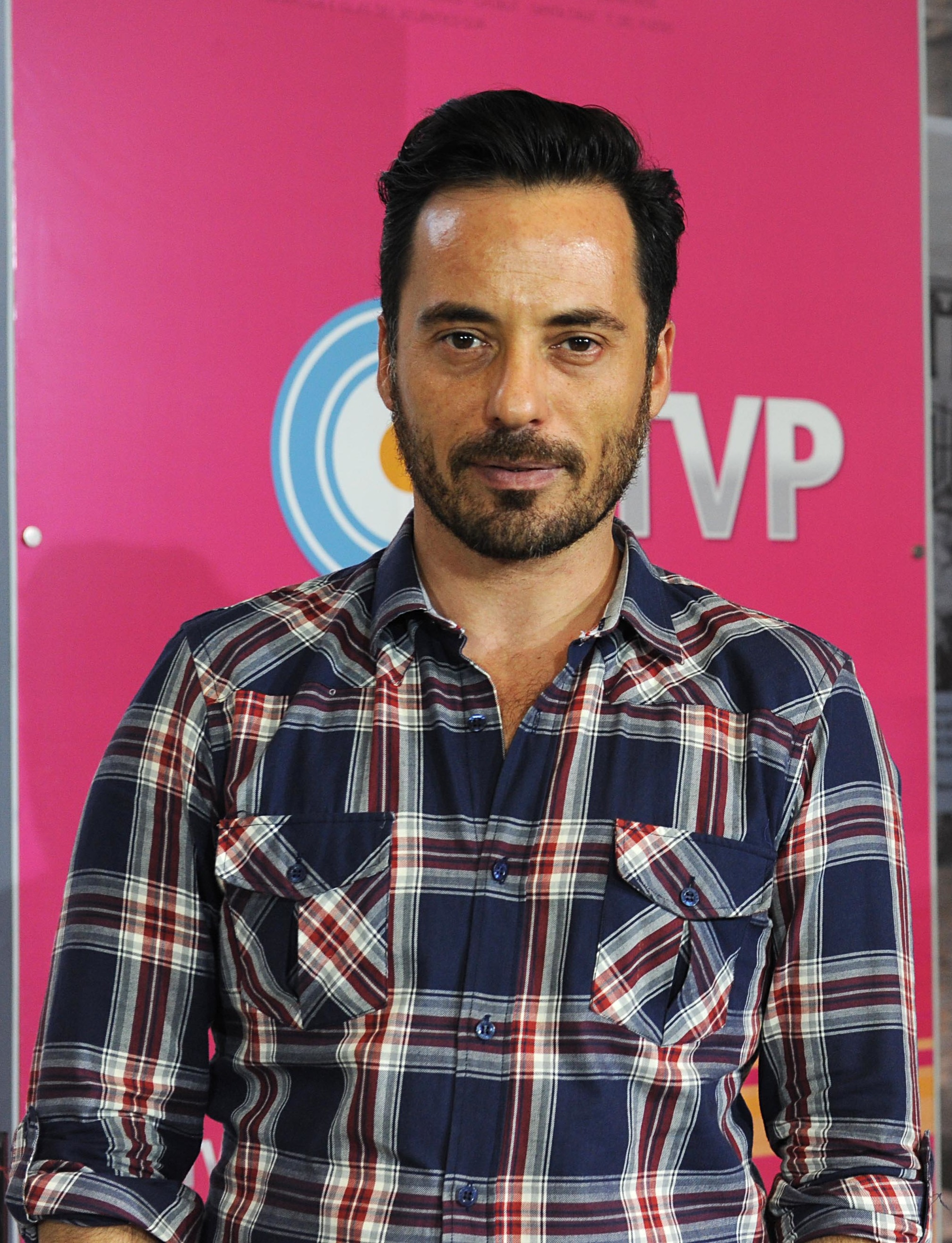
Natalia Oreiro and Diego Velázquez portray María and Javier.
- Natalia Oreiro as María
- Diego Velázquez as Javier
- Paola Barrientos as Paula
- Violeta Urtizberea as Julieta
- Alberto Ajaka as Mudo
- Ariel Staltari as Lucas

== Production ==
=== Development ===
The development of an Argentine-Uruguayan remake of the Basque-language film Bypass began in December 2020 when Natalia Oreiro and Juan Minujín were announced as its protagonists. It was also confirmed that it would be a co-production between Argentine and Uruguayan studios. The script was written by Beatriz Carbajales, Rodrigo H. Vila and Fernán Mirás. The latter was chosen to direct the film, which was his second job as a director after The Heavy Hand of the Law in 2017. Later, Minujín left the project, being replaced by Diego Velázquez.

=== Filming ===
Filming was set to begin in November 2021 but was delayed due to the director's health problems. It was finally carried out between October and November 2022, lasting five weeks. It took place in both Buenos Aires, Argentina and Montevideo, Uruguay.

The Uruguay part of the film was shot in the Pocitos and Punta Carretas neighborhoods of Montevideo and the interior scenes were filmed at a studio in Munro, Buenos Aires.

== Release ==
The film premiered in Montevideo on July 2, 2023, and in Buenos Aires a day later, and was theatrically released in both countries on July 6. The film was available for streaming exclusively on Max on September 1, 2023.
