= Música en espera =

- Argentine theatrical release poster
- Directed by: Hernán A. Golfrid
- Written by: Julieta Steinberg; Patricio Vega
- Produced by: Daniel Botti; Daniel Burman
- Starring: Natalia Oreiro; Diego Peretti; Norma Aleandro; Carlos Bermejo
- Cinematography: Lucio Bonelli
- Edited by: Luis Barros; Alejandro Brodersohn
- Music by: Guillermo Guareschi
- Release date: 19 March 2009 (Argentina)
- Running time: 106 minutes
- Country: Argentina
- Language: Spanish

Música en espera (Music on hold) is an Argentine romantic comedy film starring Natalia Oreiro and Diego Peretti. It premiered on March 19, 2009, and was the most seen movie in its starting week.

== Plot ==
The story starts with composer Ezequiel having only a few days left to prepare the score of a movie in production. He calls his bank, to request a delay in his debt payment and is transferred from one office to another. When he is transferred to employee Paula's office he finds the inspiration he needs to finish his score in her hold music. However, he only hears it briefly.

Paula is 9-months pregnant and was left by her boyfriend Santiago early in her pregnancy. Her mother, deceived by Paula into thinking that she is still with her boyfriend, arrives from Spain in order to meet him and be present at the birth.

Ezequiel meets Paula at the bank. After they talk about his debt he requests to hear her hold music, but finds a different song playing as the songs are randomly assigned each day. He and Paula make a deal: he will pretend to be Santiago in front of Paula's mother while she helps him to locate the music. After many failed attempts he never does find the inspiring hold music, but instead finds inspiration during Paula's birth. He successfully composes the soundtrack. Ezequiel and Paula finally become a couple.

== Cast ==
- Diego Peretti as Ezequiel Font
- Natalia Oreiro as Paula Otero
- Norma Aleandro as Juana
- Carlos Bermejo as Isidoro Goldberg
- Rafael Spregelburd as Acosta
- Pilar Gamboa as Viviana
- Atilio Pozzobón as Taxi driver
- María Ucedo as Mariana
- Elvira Villariño as Mirta
- Rafael Ferro as Nicolás
- Luz Cipriota as Woman in film
