= The German Doctor =

2013 historical drama thriller film

- Theatrical release poster
- Wakolda
- Directed by: Lucía Puenzo
- Written by: Lucía Puenzo
- Based on: Wakolda by Lucía Puenzo
- Produced by: Lucía Puenzo
- Starring: Àlex Brendemühl; Natalia Oreiro; Diego Peretti; Elena Roger; Guillermo Pfening; Alan Daicz; Florencia Bado
- Cinematography: Nicolás Puenzo
- Edited by: Hugo Primero
- Music by: Daniel Tarrab; Andrés Goldstein
- Distributed by: Distribution Company
- Release dates: 22 May 2013 (Cannes); 19 September 2013 (Argentina)
- Running time: 94 minutes
- Countries: Argentina; France; Spain; Norway
- Languages: Spanish; German

The German Doctor (Spanish: Wakolda) is a 2013 historical drama thriller film directed, produced, and written by Lucía Puenzo, based on her own novel Wakolda (2011). The film stars Àlex Brendemühl as Nazi SS officer and physician Josef Mengele, infamous for performing human experiments in the Auschwitz concentration camp. It also stars Florencia Bado, Natalia Oreiro, Diego Peretti, Elena Roger, and Guillermo Pfening.

== Plot ==
Josef Mengele is in exile in Argentina in 1960, living under a fake identity. He makes a long journey by road to a new location by following a family, as the roads are dangerous. Mengele has his own place to stay in Bariloche, in western Patagonia, but he takes an interest in Lilith, who is the daughter of the family, and he moves into their hotel by paying six months' rent.

Lilith was born prematurely and, as a result, she is much shorter than her classmates. She is bullied at school because of her size. Mengele is working as a doctor and suggests that he can help her grow more quickly, and Lilith's mother Eva agrees to this. Both Lilith and her mother conceal this from Lilith's father who has forbidden any such treatments. Meanwhile, people who have been searching for Mengele believe that they have found him and begin to gather evidence on his true identity.

Eva is pregnant with twins, to Mengele's fascination. He compiles copious notes on them, Lilith, and the rest of her family as he continues to aid in her growth. Lilith becomes sick as a side effect of the growth hormones that Mengele has given her. Her father Enzo is furious and kicks Mengele out of the hotel. Eva goes into labor, and Mengele is the only doctor nearby and is allowed to help with the care of the newborn twins. They are born prematurely, and Mengele starts to experiment on them. He is conscious of the fact that people are trying to find his true identity, but is hesitant to leave due to his interest in the newborn twins. Throughout the story Mengele is being tracked by a photographer, Nora Eldoc, who is in contact with Israeli Nazi hunters. The Nazi hunters act too slowly on her information allowing Mengele to flee as they watch a seaplane with Mengele on board depart. The epilogue informs us that she was murdered the day after Mengele's escape, her body found two days later buried in the snow, and that Mengele was never captured and drowned in 1979 in Brazil.

== Cast ==
- Àlex Brendemühl as Josef Mengele alias Helmut Gregor
- Florencia Bado as Lilith
- Diego Peretti as Enzo
- Natalia Oreiro as Eva
- Elena Roger as Nora Eldoc
- Guillermo Pfening as Klaus
- Alan Daicz as Tomás
- Ana Pauls as Nurse
- Abril Braunstein as Ailín
- Juani Martínez as Otto

== Release ==
It was screened in the Un Certain Regard section at the 2013 Cannes Film Festival. The film was selected as the Argentine entry for the Best Foreign Language Film at the 86th Academy Awards, but it was not nominated.

== Reception ==
On Rotten Tomatoes, the film has an approval rating of 75% based on reviews from 63 critics, with an average score of 6.5/10. The site's consensus reads, "The German Doctor applies a refreshing level of restraint to its intriguing premise, and boasts solid performances from a talented cast." On Metacritic, it has a score of 62% based on reviews from 18 critics.

=== Accolades ===
| Group | Award | Result |
|---|---|---|
| 66th Cannes Film Festival | Un Certain Regard | Nominated |
| Saint Petersburg International Film Festival | Audience Prize | Won |
| San Sebastián International Film Festival | Horizontes | Nominated |
| Films from the South Festival | Best Feature | Nominated |
| 35th International Festival of New Latin American Cinema | Best Director | Won |
| 35th International Festival of New Latin American Cinema | Special Jury Award | Won |

== See also ==
- List of submissions to the 86th Academy Awards for Best Foreign Language Film
- List of Argentine submissions for the Academy Award for Best Foreign Language Film
