= Gilda (Argentine singer) =

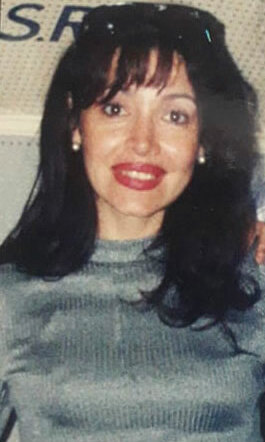
- Gilda, c. 1990s
- Born: Myriam Alejandra Bianchi; 11 October 1961; Buenos Aires, Argentina
- Died: 7 September 1996 (aged 34); Villa Paranacito, Argentina
- Occupation: Singer
- Musical career
- Genres: Argentine cumbia
- Instruments: Vocals
- Years active: 1991–1996

Myriam Alejandra Bianchi (11 October 1961 – 7 September 1996), known by her stage name Gilda, was an Argentinian cumbia singer and songwriter.

== Life and career ==
Myriam Alejandra Bianchi was born on 11 October 1961 in Villa Devoto, Buenos Aires, and grew up in the neighbourhood of Villa Lugano.

=== Music ===
Her stage name was chosen in honour of the femme fatale character played by Rita Hayworth in Gilda, the eponymous film. Gilda started getting involved in music while organizing festivals at a Catholic school. After meeting musician and agent Juan Carlos "Toti" Giménez, Gilda became a backup singer, joining a band called La Barra and soon participated in a second band called Crema Americana. In 1993, Giménez convinced her to start a solo career, recording De corazón a corazón ("From heart to heart") after signing up to local label Magenta. The following year, La única ("The one and only") featuring the hit Corazón herido ("Broken Heart ") and La puerta ("The door") was released.

In 1995, Pasito a pasito ("Step by step") was released, including the hit (and one of her most popular songs) No me arrepiento de este amor ("I don't regret this love").

=== Death ===
On 7 September 1996 Gilda died in a tragic accident while touring the country to promote her last and most successful album, Corazón valiente ("Brave heart"). Gilda, along with her mother, her daughter, three of her musicians and the bus driver died when a truck crossed the highway median and struck her touring bus head-on on km 129 of National Route 12 (Argentina) in the Province of Entre Ríos, Argentina.

=== Legacy ===
Shortly after her death, Gilda was credited by her fans with achieving miracles and some even called her a saint. On her birthday, fans go to her shrine at the accident site and leave blue candles, flowers, gifts and other offerings.

At the time of her death, Gilda was working on a new album, but only recorded five songs, which were included on the 1997 posthumous album called No es mi despedida ("Not my farewell"). The album included one of her most successful songs: "Se me ha perdido un corazón", two live songs and some songs of other tropical singers. Another album of unreleased material and demos called "Las alas del alma" was released in 1999. Among her best-known songs are Fuiste ("You were"), No me arrepiento de este amor and No es mi despedida.

Some of her songs were re-edited after her death, most notably Attaque 77's version of No me arrepiento de este amor.

== Discography ==
=== Studio albums ===
1. 1992 – De corazón a corazón – Disgal S.A.
2. 1993 – La única – Clan Music
3. 1994 – Pasito a pasito con... Gilda (CD) – Clan music
4. 1995 – Pasito a pasito con... Gilda (LP) – Santa Fe Records
5. 1995 – Corazón valiente (Gold and Double Platinum album in Argentina) – es:Leader Music
6. 1996 – Si hay alguien en tu vida – es:Magenta Discos
7. 1997 – Entre el cielo y la tierra (posthumous) – Leader Music

=== Other albums ===
1. 1997 – 17 Grandes éxitos y remixes – Por siempre Gilda – Universal Music Group
2. 1997 – Un sueño hecho realidad – Magenta Discos
3. 1998 – Por siempre Gilda 2 – Grandes Exitos y Remixados – Universal Music Group
4. 1999 – Cuando canta el corazón – Universal Music Group
5. 1999 – Las alas del alma – Leader Music
6. 1999 – Un sueño hecho realidad 2 – Temas inéditos – Magenta Discos
7. 1999 – Gildance – Músicavisión
8. 1999 – El álbum de oro – Universal Music Group
9. 2000 – Desde el alma [Grandes éxitos] – Universal Music Group
10. 2004 – Colección furia tropical – Warner Bros. Records
11. 2005 – Colección de oro Vol 1 – Magenta Discos
12. 2005 – Colección de oro Vol 2 – Magenta Discos
13. 2006 – Megamix (24 Hits) – Leader Music
14. 2007 – La única – Leader Music
15. 2008 – La más grande – Magenta Discos
16. 2011 – Un amor verdadero (DVD) – Leader Music
17. 2011 – 20 grandes éxitos – Leader Music
18. 2011 – No me arrepiento de este amor – Leader Music
19. 2014 – Grandes éxitos – Magenta Discos

== In the media ==
In 2012 the Grupo Editorial Planeta published Gilda, la abanderada de la bailanta (her only authorized biography), by journalist Alejandro Margulis.

In 2015 the play Gilda was inaugurated in Buenos Aires with Florencia Berthold in the lead role and directed by Iván Espeche.

I'm Gilda, a biographical film about her life and career was released on 15 September 2016, the 20th anniversary of her death featuring Natalia Oreiro as Gilda as well as several musicians from her original band.
