= Clandestine Childhood =

2011 film

- Theatrical release poster
- Directed by: Benjamín Ávila
- Written by: Marcelo Müller; Benjamín Ávila
- Produced by: Luis Puenzo; Benjamín Ávila
- Starring: Ernesto Alterio; César Troncoso; Natalia Oreiro
- Cinematography: Iván Gierasinchuk
- Edited by: Gustavo Giani
- Music by: Marta Roca Alonso; Pedro Onetto; Song: Divididos
- Production companies: Historias; Habitación 1520; RTA
- Distributed by: Distribution Company (ARG)
- Release dates: 20 September 2011 (Zinemaldia); 20 September 2012 (Argentina)
- Running time: 110 minutes
- Countries: Argentina; Brazil; Spain
- Language: Spanish

Clandestine Childhood (Spanish: Infancia clandestina) is a 2011 historical drama film co-written, co-produced and directed by Benjamín Ávila, starring Natalia Oreiro, Ernesto Alterio and César Troncoso.

Critically acclaimed, the film won ten awards from the Argentine Academy of Cinematography Arts and Sciences and five awards from the Argentine Film Critics Association, including the Silver Condor Award for Best Film, Best Director, Best Original Screenplay, Best Actress, and Best Supporting Actress. It was Argentina's submission for the 2013 Academy Award for Best Foreign Language Film to be presented in February 2013 at the 85th Academy Awards, but it did not make the final shortlist. It received mixed reviews from critics.

== Synopsis ==
The story is set in the Dirty War time period and during Argentina's last military dictatorship (1976-1983). A married couple, Cristina and Horacio, are guerrilla soldiers from Montoneros and are living in Cuba with their two children, Juan and Victoria. With the help of "Uncle Beto", they forge new identities and return to the country in 1979, with the aim of taking part in the leftist counteroffensive against the military junta. The movie takes the perspective of Juan, as he struggles to maintain a normal life at school given his new identity and the status of his parents as he sees glimpses of their resistance struggles.

== Cast ==
- Natalia Oreiro as Cristina, alias Charo
- Ernesto Alterio as Uncle Beto
- César Troncoso as Horacio, alias Daniel
- Teo Gutiérrez Romero as Juan, alias Ernesto Estrada
- Cristina Banegas as Grandmother Amalia
- Douglas Simon as Gregorio
- Violeta Palukas as María
- Marcelo Mininno
- Mayana Neiva as Carmen

== Production ==
The film is based on director Benjamín Ávila's childhood in Argentina (1976-1983); his mother was affiliated with the Montoneros and disappeared during the last military dictatorship. Photographs from Ávila's real life are also used in the post-credits. The actors spent several days with former Montoneros, to understand both the sociopolitical context of the time and the daily life of Montoneros partisans.

Natalia Oreiro took part in the film before getting pregnant. She found that portraying the character was a difficult task, as the director wanted her to be both sweet and aggressive. Both Oreiro and co-star Ernesto Alterio criticized the tone of the film, pointing out that the parents exposed their children to situations that threatened their lives, and although the script does not explicitly condone the actions of the Montoneros, it is not critical of them, either.

Natalia Oreiro is married to Ricardo Mollo, vocalist and lead guitar of the Rock band Divididos. Benjamín Ávila invited the band to provide the soundtrack if they liked the film. Although he does not appear on screen, Mollo played the guitar during a scene with Oreiro singing a song by the tango artist Enrique Santos Discépolo.

== Reception ==
On Rotten Tomatoes the film has a 45% rating based on 11 reviews.

The film was ranked as the 8th most seen film in Argentina at the premiere. In September 2012, the film was sold to 20 countries. As of 2025, the film has had 18 wins and 22 nominations total.

== Accolades ==
The film was submitted by the Argentine Academy of Cinematography Arts and Sciences to compete for the Best Foreign Language Oscar at the 85th Academy Awards. It prevailed over El último Elvis by a single vote, however the film did not receive a nomination.

Year	Award	Category	Recipient	Result	Ref.
2013	Young Artist Award	Best Performance in an International Feature Film - Young Actor	Teo Gutierrez Romero	Nominated	

== See also ==
- List of submissions to the 85th Academy Awards for Best Foreign Language Film
- List of Argentine submissions for the Academy Award for Best Foreign Language Film
