= I'm Gilda =

2016 film

- Theatrical release poster
- Directed by: Lorena Muñoz
- Written by: Lorena Muñoz; Tamara Viñes
- Produced by: Axel Kuschevatzky; Lorena Muñoz; Benjamín Ávila
- Starring: Natalia Oreiro; Lautaro Delgado
- Cinematography: Daniel Ortega
- Edited by: Alejandro Brodersohn; Ernesto Felder; Daniel Kim
- Music by: Pedro Onetto
- Distributed by: Buena Vista International
- Release date: 7 September 2016
- Running time: 118 minutes
- Country: Argentina
- Language: Spanish

I'm Gilda (Spanish: Gilda, no me arrepiento de este amor) is a 2016 Argentine biographical musical drama film based on the life and career of tropical singer and songwriter Gilda. It stars Natalia Oreiro in the title role.

== Cast ==
- Natalia Oreiro - Miriam Alejandra Bianchi/Gilda
  - Ángela Torres - Teenage Gilda
  - Mía Eileen Urea - 7-year-old Gilda
- Lautaro Delgado - Raúl Cagnin
- Javier Drolas - Juan Carlos "Toti" Giménez
- Daniel Melingo - Omar Eduardo Bianchi
- Susana Pampín - Isabela "Tita" Scioli
- Roly Serrano - "El Tigre" Almada (allegedly based on José “El Cholo” Olaya)
- Daniel Valenzuela - Waldo
- Diego Cremonesi - Reynaldo "Rey" Lío

== Soundtracks ==
Gilda, No Me Arrepiento de Este Amor

Soundtrack album by Natalia Oreiro
- Released: September 9, 2016
- Genres: Cumbia, Latin pop, soundtrack
- Language: Spanish

Natalia Oreiro chronology
Turmalina (2001)	Gilda, No Me Arrepiento de Este Amor (2016)

In the film Natalia Oreiro sings Paisaje written by the italian singer-songwriter Franco Simone and No me arrepiento de este amor and Corazòn herido.

== See also ==
- Gilda: The Series
