= Gustavo Kupinski =

Argentine guitarist (1974–2011)

Gustavo "Tavo" Kupinski (18 January 1974 – 4 January 2011) was an Argentine guitarist, member of the rock band Los Piojos. He was born in Buenos Aires. During his career, he integrated a band called Revelados, and was guitarist of Las Pelotas. He was killed in an accident in Dolores, Buenos Aires.

== Discography ==
Album	Band	Year	Type
Chactuchac	Los Piojos	1992	Studio
Ay Ay Ay	Los Piojos	1994	Studio
3er arco	Los Piojos	1996	Studio
Azul	Los Piojos	1998	Studio
Ritual	Los Piojos	1999	Live
Verde paisaje del infierno	Los Piojos	2000	Studio
Huracanes en Luna plateada	Los Piojos	2002	Live
Máquina de sangre	Los Piojos	2003	Studio
Fantasmas peleándole al viento	Los Piojos	2006	DVD
Desde lejos no se ve	Los Piojos	2007	DVD
Civilización	Los Piojos	2007	Studio
