= La Renga discography =

This is a list of original releases by the Argentine Rock band La Renga.

== Albums ==
=== Studio albums ===
==== Esquivando Charcos (1991) ====
1. "Somos Los Mismos de Siempre"
2. "Moscas Verdes, Para El Charlatán"
3. "Embrolos, Fatos y Paquetes"
4. "Luciendo Mi Saquito Blusero"
5. "Voy a Bailar a La Nave del Olvido"
6. "Buseca y Vino Tinto"
7. "El Juicio del Ganso"
8. "Negra Mi Alma, Negro Mi Corazón"
9. "Blues de Bolivia"

==== A Dónde Me Lleva La Vida (1994) ====
1. "El Camino del Deshielo"
2. "Cortala y Olvidala"
3. "El Rito de Los Corazones Sangrando"
4. "Blues Cardíaco"
5. "Pis y Caca"
6. "El Sátiro de La Mala Leche"
7. "El Mambo de La Botella"
8. "Debbie El Fantasma"
9. "El Circo Romano"
10. "2+2=3"
11. "Triste Canción de Amor"

==== Despedazado por Mil Partes (1996) ====
1. "Desnudo Para Siempre (o Despedazado por Mil Partes)"
2. "A La Carga Mi Rocanrol"
3. "El Final Es En Donde Partí"
4. "La Balada del Diablo y La Muerte"
5. "Cuando Vendrán"
6. "Psilocybe Mexicana"
7. "Paja Brava"
8. "Lo Fragil de La Locura"
9. "Veneno"
10. "El Viento Que Todo Empuja"
11. "Hablando de La Libertad"

==== La Renga (1998) ====
1. "El Terco"
2. "Tripa y Corazón"
3. "Bien Alto"
4. "El Hombre de La Estrella"
5. "Vende Patria Clon"
6. "El Rebelde"
7. "Me Hice Canción"
8. "Cuando Estés Acá"
9. "El Twist del Pibe"
10. "Reíte"
11. "Ser Yo"

==== La Esquina del Infinito (1999) ====
1. "La Vida, Las Mismas Calles"
2. "Motoralmaisangre"
3. "Al Que He Sangrado"
4. "Panic Show"
5. "El Cielo del Desengaño"
6. "Arte Infernal"
7. "En El Baldío"
8. "En Pie"
9. "El Rey de La Triste Felicidad"
10. "Estalla"
11. "Hey Hey, My My"
12. "Untitled"

==== Detonador de Sueños (2003) ====
1. "A Tu Lado"
2. "Detonador de Sueños"
3. "El Ojo del Huracán"
4. "La Razón Que Te Demora"
5. "Dementes En El Espacio"
6. "Estado"
7. "Las Cosas Que Hace"
8. "Noche Vudú"
9. "En Los Brazos del Sol"
10. "Míralos"
11. "El Rastro de La Conciencia"
12. "Hielasangre"

==== TruenoTierra (2006) ====
===== Disc 1 =====
1. "El Monstruo Que Crece"
2. "Almohada de Piedra"
3. "Ruta 40"
4. "La Boca del Lobo"
5. "Montaña Roja"
6. "Palabras Estorbantes"
7. "Cualquier Historia"
8. "Mujer de Caleidoscopio"
9. "Llenado de Llorar"
10. "Oscuro Diamante"
11. "Entre La Niebla"
12. "Cuadrado Obviado"

===== Disc 2 =====
1. "Alunizando Al Unisono"
2. "Sustancia Entre Las Plantas"
3. "Truenotierra"
4. "Anaximandro"
5. "Neuronas Abrazadas"

==== Algún Rayo (2010) ====
1. "Canibalismo Galáctico"
2. "Destino Ciudad Futura"
3. "La Furia de la Bestia Rock"
4. "Poder"
5. "Algún Rayo"
6. "Cristal de Zirconio"
7. "Dioses de Terciopelo"
8. "Inventa un Mañana"
9. "Disfrazado de Amigo"
10. "Lunáticos"
11. "Desoriente Blues"
12. "Caricias de Asfalto"

==== Pesados Vestigios (2014) ====
1. "Corazón Fugitivo"
2. "Nómades"
3. "Mirada de Acantilado"
4. "Día de Sol"
5. "Sabes Qué"
6. "San Miguel"
7. "Pole"
8. "Muy Indignado"
9. "No Para de Aletear"
10. "Motorock"
11. "Masomenos Blues"

=== Live albums ===
- Bailando En Una Pata (1995)
- Insoportablemente Vivo (2001)

=== Singles ===
==== EPs ====
Documento Único (2002)

1. Dementes En El Espacio
2. Detonador de Sueños
3. Hielasangre

| Year | Title | Album |
|---|---|---|
| 1994 | "El Rito de Los Corazones Sangrando" | A Dónde Me Lleva La Vida |
| 1995 | "Buseca y Vino Tinto" (live) | Bailando En Una Pata |
| 1995 | "Voy a Bailar a La Nave del Olvido" (live) | Bailando En Una Pata |
| 1996 | "La Balada del Diablo y La Muerte" | Despedazado por Mil Partes |
| 1998 | "El Revelde" | La Renga |
| 1999 | "Me Hice Canción" | La Renga |
| 2000 | "Arte Infernal" | La Esquina del Infinito |
| 2001 | "Panic Show" (live) | Insoportablemente Vivo |
| 2003 | "La Razón Que Te Demora" | Detonador de Sueños |
| 2003 | "Las Cosas Que Hace" | Detonador de Sueños |
| 2005 | "viva Papo" | non-album track |
| 2006 | "Oscuro Diamante" | TruenoTierra |
| 2007 | "Almohada de Piedra" | TruenoTierra |

== Videos ==
- Insoportablemente Vivo (2004)

=== Music videos ===
| Year | Title | Album |
|---|---|---|
| 1994 | El Rito de Los Corazones Sangrando | A Dónde Me Lleva La Vida |
| 1995 | Buseca y Vino Tinto (Live) | Bailando En Una Pata |
| 1995 | Voy a Bailar a La Nave de Olvido (Live) | Bailando En Una Pata |
| 1996 | El Final Es En Donde Partí | Despedazado por Mil Partes |
| 1996 | La Balada del Diablo y La Muerte | Despedazado por Mil Partes |
| 1996 | Lo Frágil de La Locura | Despedazado por Mil Partes |
| 1996 | Veneno | Despedazado por Mil Partes |
| 1998 | El Revelde | La Renga |
| 1999 | En El Baldío | La Esquina del Infinito |
| 2001 | Panic Show (Live) | Insoportablemente Vivo |
| 2001 | La Balada del Diablo y La Muerte (Live) | Insoportablemente Vivo |
| 2001 | El Rey de La Triste Felicidad (Live) | Insoportablemente Vivo |
| 2002 | Estalla (Live) | Insoportablemente Vivo |
| 2003 | A Tu Lado | Detonador de Sueños |
| 2003 | La Razón Que Te Demora | Detonador de Sueños |
