= 2007 in Latin music =

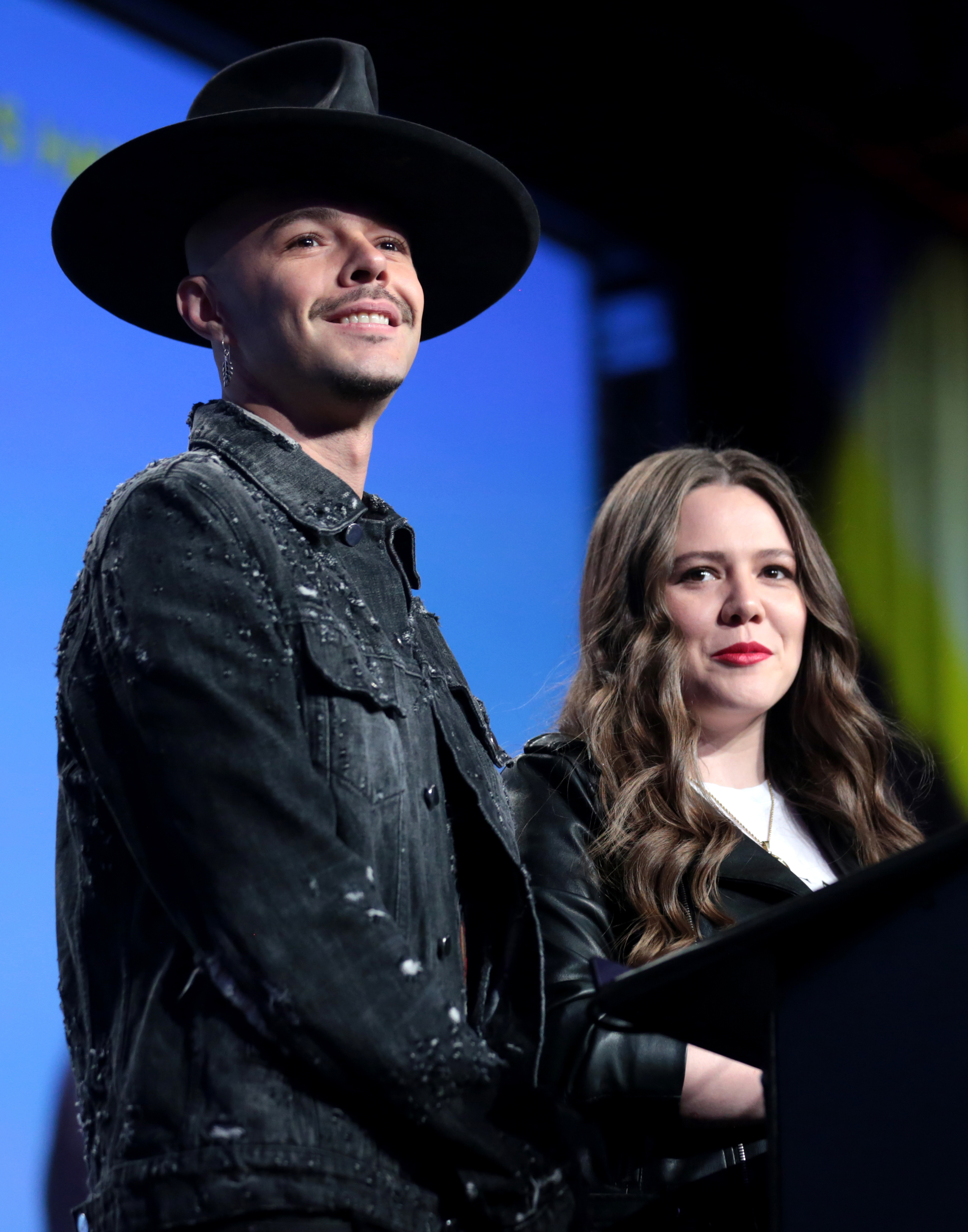
Mexican duo Jesse & Joy won the Latin Grammy Award for Best New Artist.

This is a list of notable events in Latin music (i.e. Spanish- and Portuguese-speaking music from Latin America, Latin Europe, and the United States) that took place in 2007.

== Events ==
- November 8 – The 8th Annual Latin Grammy Awards are held at the Mandalay Bay Events Center in Paradise, Nevada.
  - Dominican singer-songwriter Juan Luis Guerra is the most awarded artist of the song with his "La Llave de Mi Corazón" winning the awards for Record of the Year and Song of the Year as well as Album of the Year for the album of the same name. He is also honored as the Latin Recording Academy Person of the Year.
  - Jesse & Joy wins Best New Artist.

== Number-one albums and singles by country ==
- List of number-one singles of 2007 (Spain)
- List of number-one Billboard Top Latin Albums of 2007
- List of number-one Billboard Hot Latin Songs of 2007

== Awards ==
- 2007 Premio Lo Nuestro
- 2007 Billboard Latin Music Awards
- 2007 Latin Grammy Awards
- 2007 Tejano Music Awards

== Albums released ==
=== First quarter ===
==== January ====
Day	Title	Artist	Genre(s)	Singles	Label
9	El Papa de Los Pollitos	Los Tucanes de Tijuana	Norteño		Univision Music Group
17	Los Capo	Various Artists	Reggaeton		Rimas Entertainment
29	Acústico MTV	Lenine	MPB		Sony BMG Music Entertainment
30	Recio, Recio Mis Creadorez	Los Creadorez del Pasito Duranguense de Alfredo Ramírez			
30	Lobo Domesticado	Valentín Elizalde / Valentin Elizalde y Su Banda Guasaveña	Norteño		Universal Music Group, Regio
30	Te Voy a Mostrar	Diana Reyes			Universal Music Latino
30	El Amor Que Nunca Fue	Conjunto Primavera	Conjunto		Fonovisa Records, Univision Music Group

==== February ====
Day	Title	Artist	Genre(s)	Singles	Label
5	Un Día Más	Daniel Calveti			CanZion
5	Gitano	Rolando Villazón / Placido Domingo	Opera		Virgin Classics, EMI
6	Amantes Sunt Amentes	Panda	Alternative Rock		Movic Records, Warner Music Mexico
6	Las Mejores Canciones del Mundo	Ricardo Montaner	Soft Rock, Pop rock		EMI Televisa Music
13	Puro Dolor	Paquita la del Barrio	Mariachi, Bolero		Musart
13	Los Mejores Corridos	El Potro De Sinaloa			
14	Los Hijos del Maiz	Kinto Sol	Conscious		Univision Records
14	Tambor De Fuego	Los Muñequitos de Matanzas	Guaguanco, Rumba		Bis Music
15	El Sueño del Elefante	Strings For Kids			
16	Mart'nália em Berlim ao Vivo	Mart'nália	Samba, MPB		Quitanda
27	Puro Sierreno Bravo	Los Cuates de Sinaloa			
27	Canciones Clasicas de Marco Antonio Solis	Tito Nieves	Salsa		La Calle Records
27	El Muchacho Alegre	El Trono de México			Universal
27	Dicen Que El Tiempo	Jennifer Peña		"Soy Así (The Tequila Song)" "Ladrón" "Marzo 17" "Pero Qué Necesidad"	Univision Records
27	Truenotierra	La Renga	Hard Rock		La Renga Discos, Union De Musicos Independientes
27	De Nino A Nino: Homenaje A Nino Bravo	Nino Segarra			
27	Con El Permiso de Bola	Francisco Céspedes		"Vete de Mi" "Drume Negrita" "Ausencia"	Warner Music Mexico
27	Mazz Live Reunion – The Last Dance	Joe Lopez and Jimmy González & El Grupo Mazz			
27	Flow la Discoteka, Vol. 2	DJ Nelson	Reggaeton		Flow Music, Universal Music Latino

==== March ====
Day	Title	Artist	Genre(s)	Singles	Label
2	A Dónde Me Lleva La Vida	La Renga	Hard Rock		Interdisc
2	Con el Alma	Los Nocheros			Odeon
2	Bailando en una pata	La Renga	Hard Rock		Interdisc, Interdisc
2	Corazón valiente	Gilda	Cumbia		Leader Music, Leader Music
2	Orozco	León Gieco	Synth-Pop		EMI
2	Eterno Buenos Aires	Rodolfo Mederos	Tango		WEA
2	Tangos De Terciopelo	Quinteto Argentino de Cuerdas			
2	Comunidad	Rodolfo Mederos Orquesta Típica	Tango		DBN
2	Buenos Aires, Días y Noches de Tango	Various artists			
6	A Comer Chicharrón	La Charanga Cubana	Salsa, Son, Danzon, Timba, Tango, Cha-Cha, Charanga, Guajira		Dimelo Records
8	Live In Buenos Aires	Carlos Franzetti Trio			Amapola Records
12	Multishow ao Vivo: Ivete no Maracanã	Ivete Sangalo	Axe, MPB		Universal Music, Mercury
12	Casa de Villa	Guinga			DiscMedi Blau
13	The Magician	Sammy Figueroa and his Latin Jazz Explosion	Latin Jazz		Savant
19	Live At The Colony Theater	Albita			
20	Mi Vida Loca	Jenni Rivera	Banda	"Ahora Que Estuviste Lejos" "Cuanto Te Debo" "Sin Capitan"	Fonovisa Records
20	Papito	Miguel Bosé	Soft Rock, Latin	"Morenamía" "Bambú" "Amante Bandido" "Olvídame Tú"	Warner Music Latina
20	La Llave de Mi Corazón	Juan Luis Guerra 4.40	Bachata, Salsa, Sonero	"Medicine for My Soul" "Que Me des Tu Cariño" "La Llave de Mi Corazón"	EMI Televisa Music
20	Kingcallero del Amor	Gustavo Laureano			Universal Music Latino
20	La Reunion	Yaga y Mackie	Reggaeton		La Calle Records
26	Mi Sueño	Ibrahim Ferrer	Bolero, Son, Guajira	"Melodía del Río" "Cada Noche un Amor" "Copla Guajira"	Nonesuch
27	Como Ama una Mujer	Jennifer Lopez		"Qué Hiciste" "Me Haces Falta"	Epic
27	Sólo Pienso en Ti	Grupo Bryndis			
27	Por Ti	Abraham Velazquez			

=== Second quarter ===
==== April ====
Day	Title	Artist	Genre(s)	Singles	Label
2	Antidiotico	Orishas	Afro-Cuban, Cubano		Universal Music Latino, Surco
3	Detalles y Emociones	Los Tigres del Norte	Bolero, Corrido, Norteno	"Detalles" "El Muro" "America Central" "Emociones"	Fonovisa Records, Universal Music Group
3	Promesas No	Graciela Beltrán	Banda		Univision Records
3	Para Ti en Exclusivo	La Arrolladora Banda El Limón	Banda		Disa
3	Carlos Chávez: Complete Chamber Music Volume 4	Southwest Chamber Music			
3	Recordando...	Shaila Dúrcal	Ranchera, Ballad, Bolero		Capitol Music, Capitol Music, EMI, EMI
3	Una	Luisa Maria Güell			
3	Sentimiento	Ivy Queen	Reggaeton		Univision Records
9	Karmagedon	Attaque 77	Punk		Ariola, Sony BMG Music Entertainment
10	Mi tiempo	Chayanne	Salsa, Ballad, Vocal		Norte, Sony BMG Music Entertainment
10	Keys of Latin jazz	Chucho Valdés			
13	Eu Nunca Disse Adeus	Capital Inicial	Pop rock		Sony BMG Music Entertainment
17	Vacaneria	Fulanito	Merengue		Cutting Records
24	Residente o Visitante	Calle 13	Reggaeton	"Tango del Pecado" "Sin Exagerar" "Mala Suerta con el 13" "La Era de la Copiaera"	Norte
24	Spirit of the Moment	Michel Camilo	Latin Jazz	"Just Now" "Spirit of the Moment" "Repercussions"	Telarc Jazz, Telarc

==== May ====
Day	Title	Artist	Genre(s)	Singles	Label
1	Para Mi Gente	Anthony Cruz	Salsa		Musical Productions
2	Arráncame	Víctor García			Sony BMG Music Entertainment
2	Techarí	Ojos de Brujo	Tribal, Flamenco, Hip Hop, Rumba		Zafra Musica, Diquela Records
7	Greetings From Havana	Cubanismo	Cubano, Latin Jazz		Aim
8	Refugee	Hector Martignon	Contemporary Jazz, Fusion		ZOHO
8	A Pesar De Todo	Banda Machos	Ranchera		Sony BMG Music Entertainment (U.S. Latin) LLC, Norte
15	United We Swing	Spanish Harlem Orchestra	Salsa, Latin Jazz	"Se Formó la Rumba" "Ahora Si" "Que Bonito" "Soy Candela" "Plena con Sabor" "Danzon for My Father"	Six Degrees Records
22	Ahora Y Siempre	Alacranes Musical			
22	Enamorado De Ti	Tierra Cali			
22	En Primera Plana	Issac Delgado	Timba, Salsa	"La Mujer Que Más Te Duele" "Medley: Necesito una Amiga (Ci Vorrebbe un Amico)/Qué Te Pasa Loco/La F"	La Calle Records, Univision Music Group
22	Raise Your Hand	Poncho Sanchez	Latin Jazz	"Shotgun" "Maceo's House" "Knock on Wood"	Concord Picante
22	I'm Here	Ricardo Scales			Bay Sound Records
22	Adelantando	Jarabe de Palo			Warner Music Latina
22	Funk Tango	Paquito Rivera Quintet			
22	The Enchantment	Chick Corea and Béla Fleck	Gypsy Jazz		Concord Records
22	Rumba Palace	Arturo Sandoval	Afro-Cuban Jazz	"El Huracán del Caribe" "Sexy Lady" "Arranca de Nuevo"	Telarc
22	Capitulo 5	Siggno			

==== June ====
Day	Title	Artist	Genre(s)	Singles	Label
3	Acústico MTV	Lobão	Pop rock		Sony BMG Music Entertainment, MTV Music Television, Universo Paralelo
3	Parceria dos Viajantes	Zé Ramalho	MPB		Sony BMG Music Entertainment
3	Noites de Gala, Samba na Rua	Monica Salmaso			Discmedi
5	El Cartel: The Big Boss	Daddy Yankee	Reggaeton	"Ella Me Levantó" "A Lo Clasico" "Coraza Divina" "Plane to PR" "Me Quedaria" "Impacto [Remix]"	El Cartel Records
5	The Perfect Melody	Zion	Reggaeton		Baby Records, Street Records Corporation, CMG, Universal Motown
5	Demasiado Fuerte	Yolandita Monge	Vocal, Ballad		La Calle Records
5	Borrowed Time	Steve Khan	Contemporary Jazz		Tone Center
5	Big band Urban Folktales	Bobby Sanabria	Big Band	"Since I Fell for You" "D Train" "The Grand Wazoo"	Jazzheads
5	El Disco de Tu Corazón	Miranda!	Pop rock, Synth-Pop		Pelo Music, EMI Televisa Music
5	Regresó el Jefe	Elvis Crespo	Merengue, Bachata, Hip-House		Machete Music, Flash Music, NuLife Entertainment
5	A Gente Ainda Não Sonhou	Carlinhos Brown	Samba		Som Livre, Som Livre
5	Sentimiento de un Rumbero	Michael Stuart	Salsa, Ballad		Machete Music
11	Pisando Lo Fregao	Belo y Los Susodichos	Pop rock		Capitol Records
12	Cal	Son De La Frontera	Flamenco		World Village
19	El Godfather de La Salsa	Andy Montañez	Salsa		La Calle Records
19	Casa De Leones	Casa De Leones	Reggaeton		White Lion Records
26	El Indomable	Cristian Castro			Universal Music Latino
26	Viento a favor	Alejandro Fernández			Norte
26	Te Va a Gustar	El Chapo de Sinaloa			
26	En Las Manos de un Angel	Duelo			
26	Kamikaze	Los Rabanes	Alternative Rock, Indie Rock		Universal Music Latino
26	Lección de Vuelo	Aleks Syntek	Latin, Pop rock, Blues rock, Mariachi, Europop, Synth-Pop, Ballad		EMI Televisa Music
26	A Tu Gusto	Toño Rosario	Merengue		Universal
27	La Radiolina	Manu Chao	Folk Rock, Ska, Lo-Fi, Pop rock, Indie Rock	"Rainin in Paradize" "El Kitapena" "Mala Fama"	Nacional Records

=== Third quarter ===
==== July ====
Day	Title	Artist	Genre(s)	Singles	Label
3	Agárrese	Grupo Montez de Durango			
9	Azul	Calima	Flamenco, Rumba		Capitol Records, EMI, Colorecords
9	Logo	Kevin Johansen			Sony BMG Music Entertainment
10	Cualquier Día	Kany García			Norte, Sony BMG Music Entertainment
17	Con el Corazón en la Mano	Rojo			ReyVol Records
17	Live from Madison Square Garden	Víctor Manuelle			
19	Piazzolla and Villa-Lobos: Music for Clarinet and Piano	Javier Vinasco and Edith Ruiz			
23	Mutantes Ao Vivo – Barbican Theatre, Londres 2006	Os Mutantes	Psychedelic Rock		Luaka Bop
24	El Cantante	Marc Anthony			Norte
24	Los 4 Fantasticos	Karis	Merengue		Pina Records, Universal Music Latino
24	Hi-Lo Split	Marc Antoine	Smooth Jazz		Peak Records
24	Echo Presenta: Invasión Vol. 1	Echo	Reggaeton	"Delirando"	Machete Music, VI Music
31	Fuego Nuevo	El Trono de México			
31	El Regreso de los Reyes	Cruz Martínez y Los Super Reyes			

==== August ====
Day	Title	Artist	Genre(s)	Singles	Label
1	Que Belo Estranho Dia Pra Se Ter Alegria	Roberta Sá	Vocal, Samba, MPB		MP, B, Universal Music
7	El Endemico Embustero y El Incauto Pertinaz	Rosendo Mercado	Hard Rock		DRO Atlantic
13	The New Bossa Nova	Luciana Souza	Contemporary Jazz, Bossa Nova		Verve Records
14	Un Día Más En El Gran Circo	Jeremías	Latin Pop		Universal Music Latino, Universal Music Latino
21	Quién Dijo Ayer	Ricardo Arjona	Latin Pop	"Quién" "Quiero"	Norte, Sony BMG Music Entertainment
21	Bengala	Bengala	Alternative Rock		Universal Music Group
21	Deseos de Amarte	Domenic Marte	Bachata	"Deseos de Amarte" "Con Los Ojos Cerrados" "Yo Me Equivoco" "Eres Así"	J&N Records
27	Lola Erase una Vez	Soundtrack	Latin Pop		
27	Irreemplazable	Beyoncé	House, Contemporary R&B		Columbia
28	Enamorándome	Myriam Hernández	Ballad, Vocal, Romantic	"¿Donde Estará Mi Primavera?"	La Calle Records

==== September ====
Day	Title	Artist	Genre(s)	Singles	Label
1	Ritmo, Ritual e Responsa	Charlie Brown Jr.	Pop rock		EMI
10	Dúos, Tríos y Otras Perversiones	Ariel Rot	Pop rock, rock & roll		Gasa
10	Estação Melodia	Luiz Melodia	MPB, Samba		Biscoito Fino
10	Acústico II – Volume 1	Bruno & Marrone	Brazilian-romantic		
11	Fantasía Pop	Belanova	Latin	"Baila Mi Corazón" "Toma Mi Mano" "Cada Que..." "One, Two, Three, Go! (1, 2, 3, Go!)" "Paso El Tiempo"	Universal Music Group
11	La Lengua Popular	Andrés Calamaro	Pop rock		GASA
11	De Nuevo	Emilio Navaira	Conjunto, Tejano		Universal Music Latino
18	90 Millas	Gloria Estefan	Salsa, Reggaeton, Rumba	"No Llores" "Me Odio" "Píntame De Colores"	Burgundy Records
18	No Hay Espacio	Black Guayaba			
18	Sobrenatural	Alexis & Fido	Reggaeton	"5 Letras" "Soy Igual Que Tú" "Somos Tal Para Cual" "Sobrenatural"	Norte, Wild Dogz Inc
18	Una Rosa Blu	Gloria Trevi	Salsa, Ballad	"Psicofonía" "Cinco Minutos" "Pruébamelo" "El favor de la soledad" "Lo que una chica por amor es capaz" "Inmaculada"	Univision Records
18	Voy a Convencerte	Los Primos de Durango	Duranguense		
18	100% Mexicano	Pepe Aguilar	Mariachi		EMI Televisa Music, Equinoccio
18	Eternamiente	Molotov	Alternative rock, punk		Universal Music Latino
18	Cursi	Circo	Alternative rock, indie pop, new wave		Sony BMG Music Entertainment
18	Samba Meu	Maria Rita	Samba, MPB		Warner Music Brazil, Wea Music
18	Te Regalo el Mar	Frank Reyes	Bachata, Merengue	"Amor Desperdiciado" "Te Regalo el Mar"	J&N Records
25	Para Siempre	Vicente Fernández	Ranchera	"Estos Celos" "La Derrota" "Para Siempre" "Un Millón de Primaveras"	Sony Music Mexico
25	Arpegios de amor: Requiem por tres almas	Ana Gabriel	Latin pop		
25	Sim	Vanessa da Mata	MPB		Sony BMG Music Entertainment
25	Caribe Gardel	Jerry Rivera	Vocal, Salsa, Bolero	"Cuesta Abajo" "Yira Yira"	EMI Latin
28	Jardim Abandonado	Sérgio and Odair Assad	Classical		Nonesuch

=== Fourth quarter ===
==== October ====
Day	Title	Artist	Genre(s)	Singles	Label
1	Canta o Samba da Bahia ao Vivo	Beth Carvalho	Samba		EMI
1	Sambista Perfeito	Arlindo Cruz	Samba, MPB		Deckdisc
1	.com Você	César Menotti and Fabiano	Country		Mercury, Universal Music
2	Recuerdos del Alma	Los Temerarios	Regional Mexican		Fonovisa
2	Atrévete	Jae-P	Latin hip-hop		Univision Records
2	10	Hombres G	Pop rock		Warner Music Spain
2	It's My Time	Tito El Bambino	Reggaeton, Merengue, Bachata	"Sólo Dime Que Sí" "Sol, Playa y Arena" "El Tra" "En La Disco" "La Busco"	EMI, EMI Televisa Music
2	Sin Comentarios	Tito Rojas		"Digame Señora" "Enamorado"	Musical Productions, Norte, J&N Records
9	Sino	Café Tacuba	Alternative rock		Universal Music Group
9	Buenos Aires Report	Pablo Ziegler, Quique Sinesi and Walter Castro	Tango		Saphrane
16	Renacer	Kevin Ceballo	Salsa	"El Milagro de Tu Amor"	J&N Records, Musical Productions, Norte
18	La Vida... Es Un Ratico	Juanes	Pop rock	"Me Enamora" "Gotas de Agua Dulce" "Tres"	Universal Music Latino
18	Ayer Te Ví... Fue Más Claro Que La Luna	Jesus Adrian Romero	Religious		Vastago Producciones
23	Y Que Quede Claro	La Arrolladora Banda El Limón	Banda		
23	King of Kings: Live	Don Omar	Reggaeton		Machete Music, VI Music
23	Ao Vivo em Uberlândia	Victor & Leo	Country		Sony BMG Music Entertainment
25	Laberintos Entre Artistas y Dialectos	Catupecu Machu	Acoustic		EMI
30	Qué Bonito... ¡Es Lo Bonito!	Banda el Recodo	Banda		
30	Fome de Tudo	Nação Zumbi	Alternative rock, Indie Rock, Dub		Polysom, Deskdisc
31	Energía Divina	Juanse	Rock en español		Tocka Discos, Sony BMG Music Entertainment

==== November ====
Day	Title	Artist	Genre(s)	Singles	Label
2	Mitad/Mitad	Héctor Acosta "el Torito"	Bachata	"Sin Perdón" "Con Que Ojos"	
6	Wisin vs. Yandel: Los Extraterrestres	Wisin & Yandel	Reggaeton	"Sexy Movimiento" "Oye, ¿Dónde Está El Amor?" "Ahora Es"	Machete Music
6	Una Navidad a Mi Estilo	Víctor Manuelle	Salsa, Christmas music	"Yo Traigo la Parranda"	Machete Music
6	Lo Mejor de Andrea Bocelli: Viviré	Andrea Bocelli	Vocal, Ballad	"Vive ya (Dare to Live)"	Sugar, Siente Music
6	Capaz de Todo Por Ti	K-Paz de la Sierra	Regional Mexican		Disa
6	La Diva en Vivo	Jenni Rivera	Banda, Ranchera		Univision Records, FonoVisa
13	Cómo Se Llega A Belén	Voz Veis	Vocal, Christmas music		Sonografica
13	Bohemio	Chucho Avellanet with Trío Los Andinos			
13	Rodolfo	Fito Páez			RCA, Discos Pop Art, Day 1 Entertainment
13	No Es De Madera	Joan Sebastian			
13	Aura	Los Hermanos Rosario	Merengue	"Alo" "Te Echo de Menos"	J&N Records, Norte
17	Kings of Bachata: Sold Out at Madison Square Garden	Aventura	Bachata		Premium Latin Music Inc., Discos 605, Norte, Sony BMG Music Entertainment
17	17	Motel	Rock en español		Warner Music Mexico
20	Contraste	Gilberto Santa Rosa	Salsa	"Conteo Regresivo" "No Te Vayas" "Pensando en Ti" "Llegó el Amor"	Norte
20	Exitos En 2 Tiempos	Olga Tañón	Merengue, Bachata, Salsa	"Cosas del Amor" "Hoy Quiero Confersarme"	Univision Records
20	Empezar Desde Cero	RBD	Pop rock, Ballad, Latin Pop	"Inalcanzable" "Empezar Desde Cero" "Y No Puedo Olvidarte"	EMI
20	Fuerza	Alejandra Guzmán	Latin pop	"Inalcanzable" "Empezar Desde Cero" "Y No Puedo Olvidarte"	EMI Latin
20	Señor Bachata	José Feliciano	Bachata	"Mar y Cielo"	Siente Music
20	Sentimiento: Platinum Edition	Ivy Queen	Reggaeton, Ballad, Salsa	"Menor Que Yo" "Dime Si Recuerdas"	Univision Records
20	La Nueva Escuela: Nu School	N'Klabe	Salsa	"Si Ya No Estás" "El Día de Tu Suerte (Hoy)"	Machete Music, NuLife Entertainment
20	En Lo Claro	Julio Voltio	Reggaeton	"El Mellao" "Ponmela"	Sony BMG, Norte
21	Chico Buarque Carioca – Ao Vivo	Chico Buarque	Bossanova, MPB		Random Records
27	Mar dulce	Bajofondo	Breaks, Downtempo, Tango		Surco

==== December ====
Day	Title	Artist	Genre(s)	Singles	Label
4	20 Aniversario	Los Tucanes de Tijuana	Regional Mexican		
4	A Mi Ley	Patrulla 81	Regional Mexican		
4	Alegria Calentana	Tierra Cali	Regional Mexican		
4	Anatomía	Ana Belén	Vocal, Ballad		Ariola, Sony BMG Music Entertainment
4	Mis Rancheras Consentidas	El Chapo de Sinaloa	Banda		
4	Tito Nieves en Vivo	Tito Nieves	Salsa	"Mi Mayor Sacrificio"	La Calle Records, Universal Music Group Mexico, Univision Records
4	Te Quiero: Romantic Style in da World	Flex	Reggaeton	"Te Quiero"	Televisa EMI Music, Televisa EMI Music, Asterisco Record, Asterisco Record
4	Entre Mariposas	Yuridia	Latin, pop rock	"Ahora Entendí"; Yo Por Él; En Su Lugar	Norte, Sony Music
11	Real	Ednita Nazario	Latin pop		Norte
11	Con Mi Soledad	Juan	Latin pop		Fonovisa Records, Univision Music Group
11	Sinfonía Soledad	Panda	Alternative rock		Movic Records, Warner Music Mexico
11	Papitour	Miguel Bosé	Ballad, Europop, Vocal		WEA
11	En Vivo Desde Bellas Artes	Monchy & Alexandra	Bachata		J&N Records
11	Broke & Famous	Ñejo y Dalmata	Reggaeton		Universal Latino, Urban
14	Checazos de Carnava, Vol. 3	Checo Acosta			
18	Sinfonía del Alma	Marcos Witt	Gospel, Religious		CanZion
18	?	Bersuit	Alternative rock, Folk Rock		Universal
18	Live at the Village Vanguard	Bebo Valdés and Javier Colina	Latin jazz		Calle 54 Records
18	El Heredero	Miguelito	Reggaeton		El Cartel Records, Machete Music
18	Los Mas Sueltos Del Reggaeton	Jowell y Randy	Reggaeton		Warner Bros., White Lion Records
20	Enojado	Alejandro Lerner	Latin pop		FEG Discos, El Pie Records
26	Matizes	Djavan	Folk		Luanda Records
28	Necia	Alih Jey	Rock en español		

=== Unknown dates ===
Title	Artist	Genre(s)	Singles	Label
Pedro Mariano	Pedro Mariano	MPB		Mercury, Universal Music
Mi Parranda	Andrés Jiménez, "el Jíbaro"	Tropical		
Inolvidable	Julissa	Latin Christian		
Esta Tierra Es Tuya (This Land Is Your Land)	Sones De México Ensemble	Regional Mexican		Sones De Mexico, Inc.
Before the Next Teardrop Falls	Little Joe & La Familia	Tejano		TDI Records
Vagar Libremente	Sunny Sauceda	Tejano		
Allá en el Sur	Ilona	Latin pop		Virgin, EMI Televisa Music
El Más Grande con Los Grandes	Alfredo Gutiérrez	Vallenato		Codiscos, Costeno
El Papá de Los Amores	Peter Manjarrés and Sergio Luis Rodríguez	Vallenato		Codiscos, Costeno
Románticos De Ayer, Hoy y Siempre	Bobby Cruz	Bolero, Salsa		Tropisounds, Codiscos
Do Brasil e do Mundo	Martinho da Vila	Samba		DiscMedi Blau, DiscMedi Blau
El Súper Joe	Joe Arroyo	Salsa, Cumbia		Disco Fuentes
Incomparable	Jimmy González & El Grupo Mazz	Tejano		Freddie Records
Milongueros	Esteban Morgado	Tango		Not On Label (Esteban Morgado Self-Released)
Una Guitarra En Granada	Juan Habichuela	Flamenco		Universal Music Spain S.L.
Música Nova	Danni Carlos	Pop rock		Sony BMG Music Entertainment
{Des}concerto ao Vivo – 06-07-07 Traje: (Rock Fino)	Pitty	Hard rock		Deskdisc
Acústico MTV	Paulinho da Viola	Samba		Sony BMG Music Entertainment
Companheiro é Companheiro	Cezar & Paulinho			Atracao Fonografica
Cidade Cinza	CPM 22	Alternative rock, melodic hardcore, pop rock		Universal Music, Arsenal Music

== Best-selling records ==
=== Best-selling albums ===
The following is a list of the top 10 best-selling Latin albums in the United States in 2007, according to Billboard.

Rank	Album	Artist
1	Celestial	RBD
2	K.O.B. Live	Aventura
3	El Cartel: The Big Boss	Daddy Yankee
4	Amar Es Combatir	Maná
5	Vencedor	Valentín Elizalde
6	Historia de un Ídolo, Vol. 1	Vicente Fernández
7	Como Ama una Mujer	Jennifer Lopez
8	King of Kings	Don Omar
9	Los Vaqueros	Wisin & Yandel
10	Now Esto Es Musica! Latino 2	Various artists

=== Best-performing songs ===
The following is a list of the top 10 best-performing Latin songs in the United States in 2007, according to Billboard.

Rank	Album	Artist
1	"Mi Corazoncito"	Aventura
2	"Bendita Tu Luz"	Maná featuring Juan Luis Guerra
3	"Tu Recuerdo"	Ricky Martin featuring La Mari and Tommy Torres
4	"Dímelo"	Enrique Iglesias
5	"Sola"	Héctor el Father
6	"¡Basta Ya!"	Conjunto Primavera
7	"Iqual Que Ayer"	R.K.M & Ken-Y
8	"No Te Veo"	Casa de Leones
9	"Pegao"	Wisin & Yandel
10	"De Ti Exclusivo"	La Arrolladora Banda El Limón

== Deaths ==
- February 3 – Pedro Knight, 85, Cuban–American musician and husband of Celia Cruz.
- February 7 – Pedrinho Mattar, 70, Brazilian pianist
- February 22 – Luís Chaves, 75, Brazilian bass player
- March 12 – Octavio Mesa, 73, Colombian songwriter and singer
- March 18 – Beto Quintanilla, 58, Mexican singer
- March 27 – Faustino Oramas, 95, Cuban singer (Buena Vista Social Club), cancer.
- May 30 – Cacho Tirao, 66, Argentine guitarist and songwriter
- June 11 – Tito Gómez, 59, Puerto Rican salsa singer, former member of Ray Barretto and Sonora Ponceña bands, heart attack.
- June 19 – Antonio Aguilar, 88, Mexican actor and singer, pneumonia.
- August 10 – Mario Rivera, 68, Dominican Latin jazz saxophonist with Machito, Tito Puente, Tito Rodríguez orchestras, bone cancer.
- September 15:
  - Generoso Jiménez, 90, Cuban bandleader, trombonist, and arranger
  - Aldemaro Romero, 79, Venezuelan composer, pianist and conductor (complications from intestinal blockage)
- December 2 – Sergio Gómez, 34, Mexican singer (K-Paz de la Sierra)
- December 4 – Carlos Valdes, 81, Cuban conga player, respiratory failure.
