= Estadio Tomás Adolfo Ducó =

Football stadium in Buenos Aires, Argentina

Tomás Adolfo Ducó Stadium
- Estadio Tomás Adolfo Ducó
- Palacio Ducó
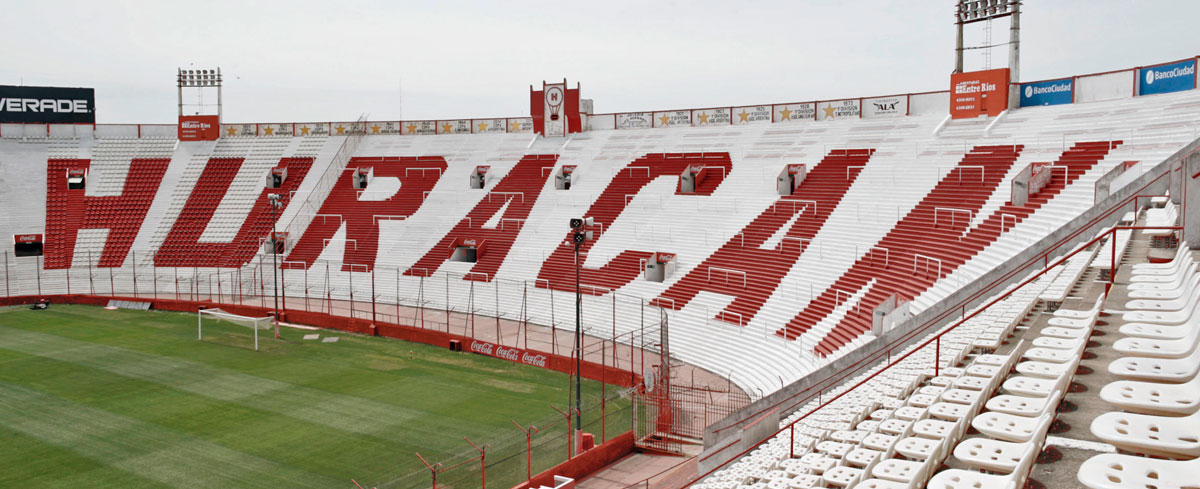
- Interior view in the 2010s
- Interactive map of Tomás Adolfo Ducó Stadium
- Former names: Estadio Jorge Newbery (1924–67)
- Address: Av. Amancio Alcorta 2570; Buenos Aires; Argentina
- Coordinates: 34°38′37″S 58°23′47″W
- Owner: C.A. Huracán
- Capacity: 48,314
- Surface: Grass
- Field size: 105 x 70
- Current use: Football; Concerts

Construction
- Opened: August 17, 1924; 102 years ago
- Renovated: 1947
- Architects: Curutchet, Giraldez & Olivera Studio

Website
- cahuracan.com/elpalacio

The Estadio Tomás A. Ducó is a football stadium in Argentina, located in the Parque Patricios neighborhood of Buenos Aires. The stadium is the home ground of Club Atlético Huracán and has a capacity of 48,340 spectators.

Built between 1941 and 1947, the stadium was named after lieutenant colonel Tomás Adolfo Ducó, president of Club Huracán in three periods (1938–45, 1949, 1952–54) and regarded as the most notable chairman in the history of the institution, as he was the promoter of the stadium's reconstruction in the 1940s.

In 2024, Club Atlético Huracán drew an average home attendance of 30,362. All their home games took place at the Estadio Tomás Adolfo Ducó during that league season.

== History ==
=== Jorge Newbery ===
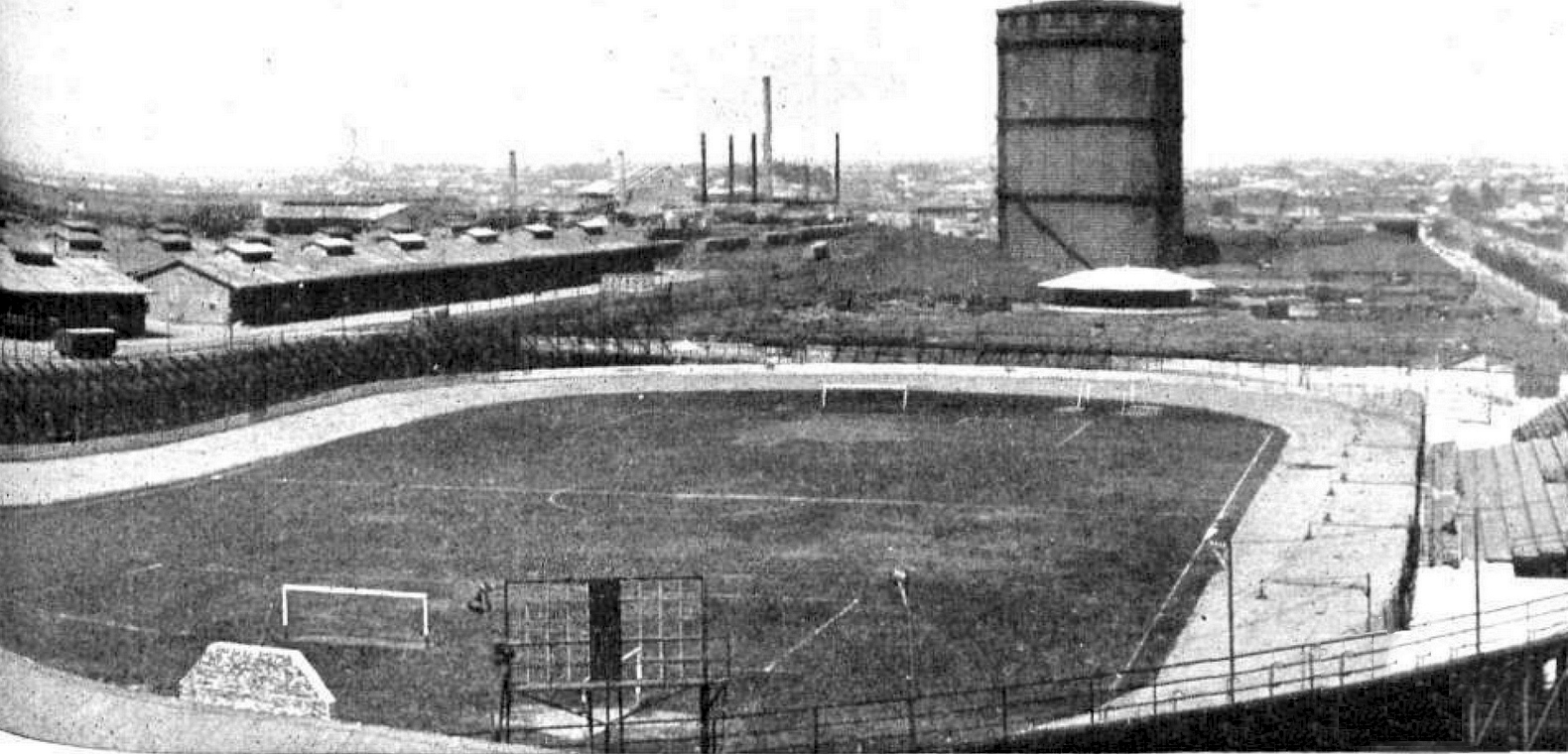
The stadium in 1937, with its racetrack

The first field of C.A. Huracán was land on Arenas Street that belonged to the Municipality of Buenos Aires. The club rented that land from 1911 to 1913, when the Municipal authorities forced the club to leave and establish in another place. In 1914 Huracán moved to Chiclana Avenue, near to San Lorenzo de Almagro's home on La Plata Avenue. Playing its home games there, Huracán won its first Primera División titles in 1921 and 1922. One year later, Huracán left that home.

In August 1924, the club rented land on the corner of Amancio Alcorta and Luna in Parque Patricios. The venue, inaugurated in a match v Colón de Santa Fe, had a capacity for 12,000 people and was named after Argentine aviator Jorge Newbery, from whose balloon the club had taken inspiration for its badge. Newbery was also a usual collaborator of the club and even honorary president. Huracán played its home games there when the club won the 1925 and 1928 league titles. By the mid-1930s, the stadium had increased its capacity to near 40,000.

The stadium also had a concrete race track for motorcycle racing and track cycling. Competitions were held during the 1920s and 1930s.

In April 1939, the club acquired the land – at a cost of $ 700,000 – to remodel the stadium. The National Government granted C.A. Huracán a loan to build its new home venue.

=== Tomás Adolfo Ducó ===
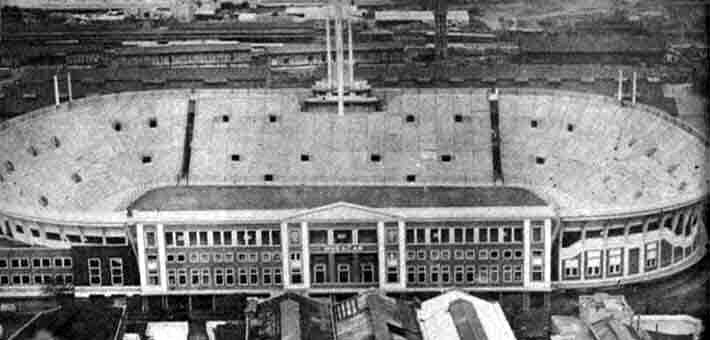
The stadium the day of its inauguration, 1947

Works started in October 1941, under the direction of architects Curutchet, Giraldez & Olivera through their firm "CGO". The studio had designed the current Casa de la Moneda building in 1941. Works on Huracán's stadium lasted about six years, during which the club was granted another loan ($1,553,472) to finish the construction.

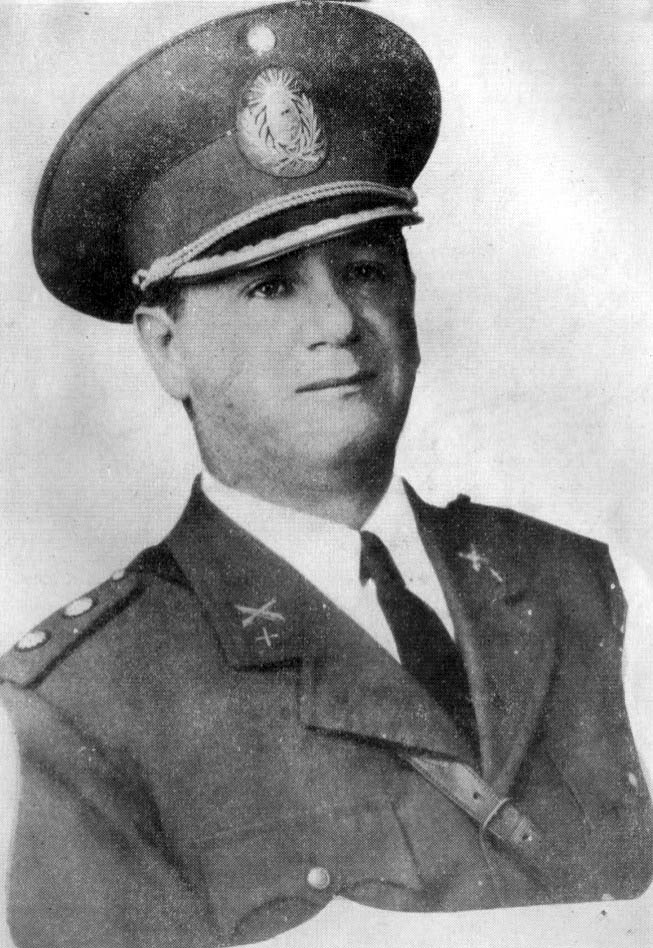
Former president of Huracán, Colonel Tomás A. Ducó. The stadium was named after him in 1967

The new stadium (built to replace wooden grandstands with concrete structures) was opened on September 7, 1947, in a Primera División match v Boca Juniors. Huracán won 4–3. Nevertheless, it was officially inaugurated on November 10, 1949, when Huracán beat Uruguayan side Peñarol 4–1.

In September 1967, the stadium was named "Tomás Adolfo Ducó", honoring the club's most notable president, who was also the main mover in the construction of the stadium, and a former player.

Ducó was imprisoned and confined to Martín García Island. After being released, he returned to Huracán, being elected again as president of the club in 1949.

== Concerts ==
The stadium has hosted several music concerts, mainly of local rock bands. Patricio Rey y sus Redonditos de Ricota gave their first concert in a stadium at Huracán in 1993, with more than 80,000 spectators.

Hard rock band La Renga performed in Huracán in 1999 with an attendance of 60,000. The band returned to the Ducó to record their live album Insoportablemente Vivo in 2001. They also recorded another live album, En el Ojo del Huracán five years later. The Palacio Ducó became a frequent venue for the band, giving new concerts in 2017. Another Argentine rock band, Los Piojos, recorded a live album at Huracán in 2001.

In 2024, the British heavy metal band Iron Maiden performed at Tomás Ducó Stadium on 1 December 2024. The concert was part of their Future Past World Tour.

Punk rock band Green Day performed at Tomás Ducó in September 2025. The concert (part of The Saviors Tour) was the 5th. visit of the American band to Argentina.

In October 2025, American rock band Guns n' Roses gave two sold-out concerts at Huracán Stadium. The shows were part of their Because What You Want & What You Get Are Two Completely Different Things Tour.

== In popular culture ==
The Tomás A. Ducó stadium was the first of Argentine football to appear on an Academy Awards-winning movie, The Secret in Their Eyes ("El Secreto de Sus Ojos"). In the movie, Inspector Espósito (played by Ricardo Darín and his collaborator Sandoval (Guillermo Francella) attend a Huracán v Racing match –held in Palacio Ducó– in search of a murder suspect, knowing he was a strong Racing supporter.

The phrase about the suspect's passion for a team ("The guy may change anything; his face, house, family, girlfriend, religion, God. But there is a thing that he can't change: his passion") became one of the most memorable moments of the film, not only to describe the character but the Argentine passion for football.

== Gallery ==
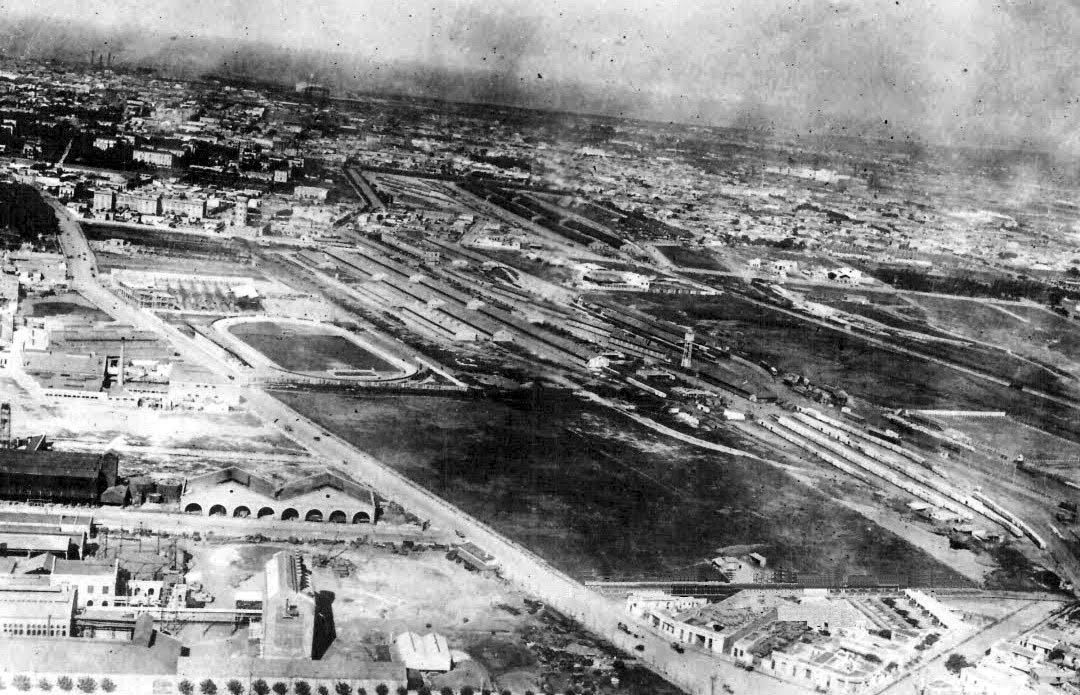
Aerial view in 1924

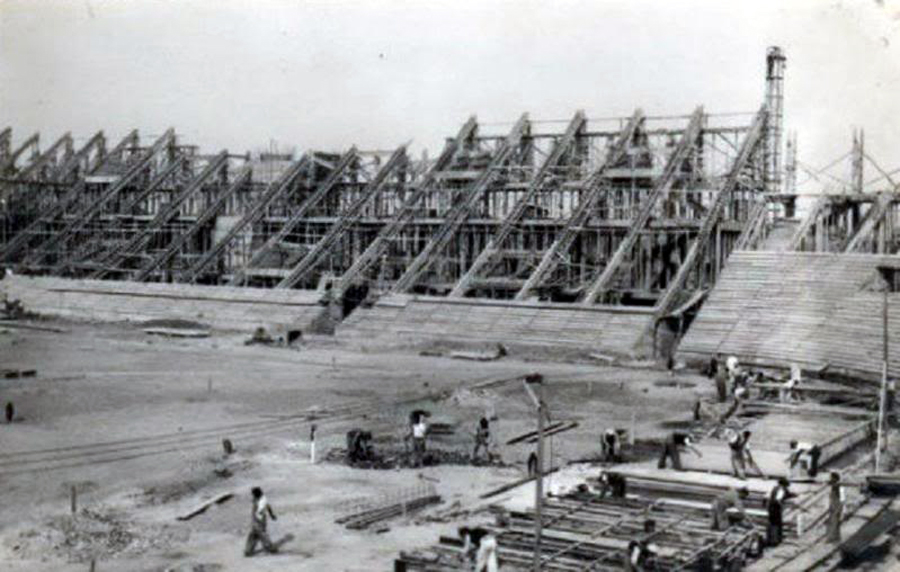
Expansion, 1940s

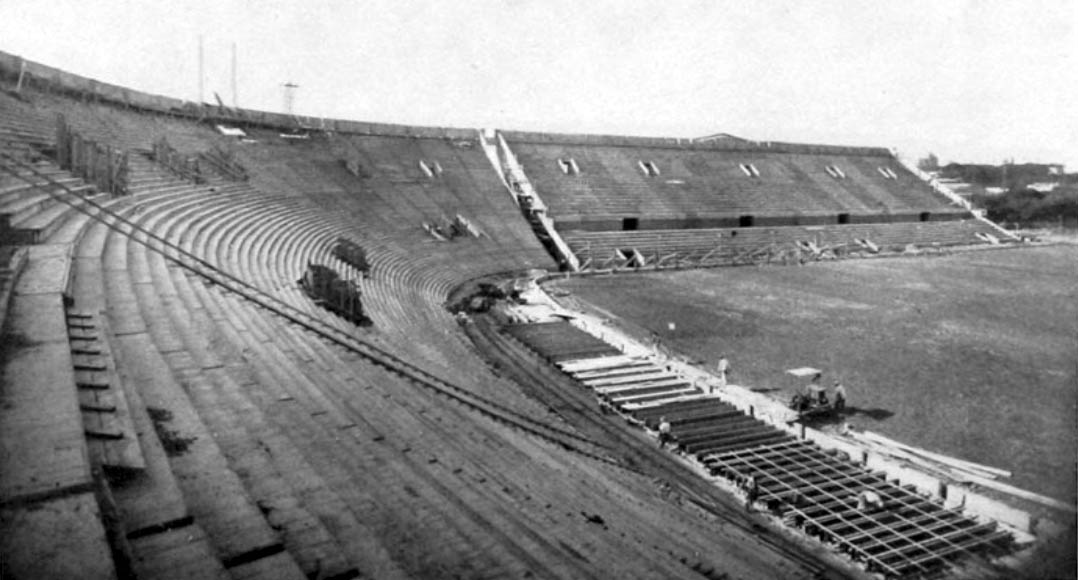
Grandstands in 1945

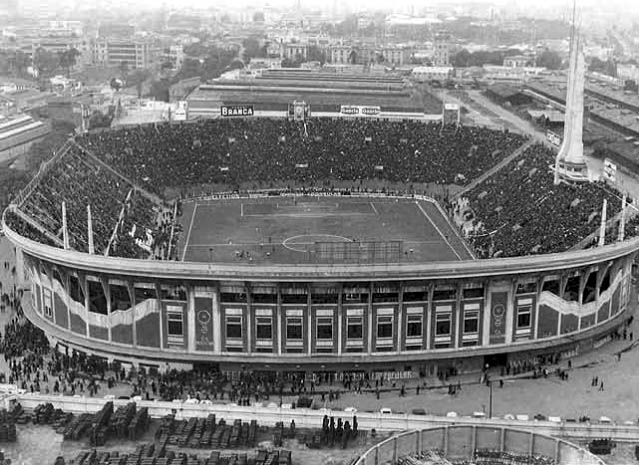
Aerial view during a football match, 1962

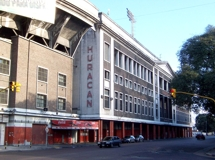
Exterior view, 2010s
