= Alejandro Brittes =

Argentine composer (born 1976)

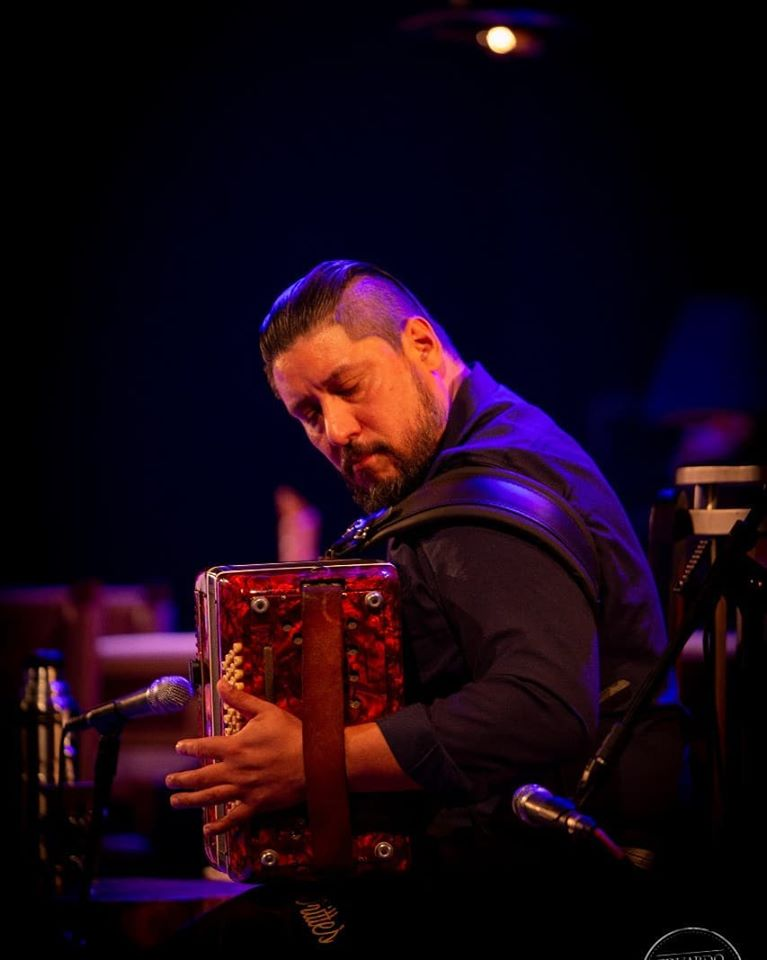

Background information
- Born: Daniel Alejandro Brittes; July 5, 1976 (age 50); Buenos Aires, Argentina
- Genre: Chamamé
- Occupations: Accordionist; composer; researcher
- Instrument: Accordión
- Spouse: Magali de Rossi
- Website: https://en.alejandrobrittes.com/

Alejandro Brittes (born July 5, 1976) is an Argentine composer, accordionist and researcher of the music of the littoral region of Argentina. He has been residing in Porto Alegre, Brazil since 2010. He was the first accordionist of the genre to perform at the Library of Congress in the United States. Considered by The Boston Globe as one of the greatest exponents of contemporary chamamé, the complexity of his works is reminiscent of Astor Piazzolla. In 2026, he organized the State of Rio Grande do Sul's first official cultural mission to the United States to commemorate the 400th anniversary of the Jesuit-Guarani Missions, becoming the first Argentine musician to speak about the musical legacy of the Jesuit-Guarani Missions at the Organization of American States (OAS) Columbus Memorial Library.

== Career ==
A son of parents from the province of Corrientes, at 12 years old, Alejandro began to study accordion with Nini Flores. When he was 15 years old, he formed his first musical group, and recorded his first album "Por la Senda Chamamecera".

In 1989, he went to study music at the Juan Pedro Esnaola School, later continuing his career as a musician.

In 1996, he won the Cosquín de Oro award, for Best Instrumentalist with his national debut at the Próspero Molina plaza in the Festival Nacional de Folklore de Cosquín, Córdoba, Argentina. In the same year, Alejandro was invited by the rock group Los Piojos to record on the album "3er arco" playing accordion on the songs "Todo Pasa" and "Don't say tomorrow", and performing in the album release at Estadio Obras Sanitarias and in the Micro Estadio de Ferro, in Buenos Aires. He also recorded with the group on the songs "Vals Inicial" and "Y quemás" on their album "Azul".

In 2005, he created and produced the ensemble Cuarteto típico de Chamamé with Jorge Toloza and Luiz Santa Cruz, and recorded the album Herencia chamacera in 2007.

Already residing in Brazil, in 2011 he was invited to represent Brazil and Argentina at the Festival Internacional de Acordeón Vallenato, in Colombia.

In 2012, Brittes received an invitation from the Cámara de Comercio Brazil-Argentina in São Paulo, to present a concert at the Memorial da América Latina in São Paulo, Brazil, sharing the stage with vocalist Luiza Possi and Orquesta Heartbreakers.

Official Ceremony Marking the 400th Anniversary of the Guarani Jesuit Missions at the OAS (Organization of American States) in Washington, D.C.

Also in 2012, he went on his first tour of Europe accompanied by André Ely and Lucas Rocha, performing 9 concerts with the Portuguese accordionist João Gentil in Lisbon and Praia da Tocha, Portugal. Later, he began his second European tour in France, accompanied by André Ely, Lucas Rocha and Miguel Castilhos, performing at the Cité Internationale Universitaire de Paris, the Maison de L’Argentine and also at Café El Sur.

In 2013, he invited the folk music group Plzenský Pepící from the Czech Republic to tour 10 cities in Brazil. In January of the same year, he recorded his seventh album "El Viento y las hojas", financed by the Ministry of Culture of Brazil, performing album release events at the "Sociale" Theatre, part of the Itinerari Folk Festival in Italy, and at the Kulturní dům Peklo Theatre in Czech Republic.

In 2014, together with her producer Magali de Rossi and the producer of the singer-songwriter Teresa Parodi, María Elvira Grillo Cevey, they created the "Caravana Chamamecera" Project, inviting the artists Elton Saldanha and "Os Fagundes", conforming a cultural integration project between Brazil and Argentina, performing more than 150 concerts in Brazil and abroad.

In 2019, Brittes produced and participated in the tour "80 años" of Argentine accordionist Raúl Barboza in the Brazilian states of Rio Grande do Sul, Santa Catarina and Paraná, Brazil.

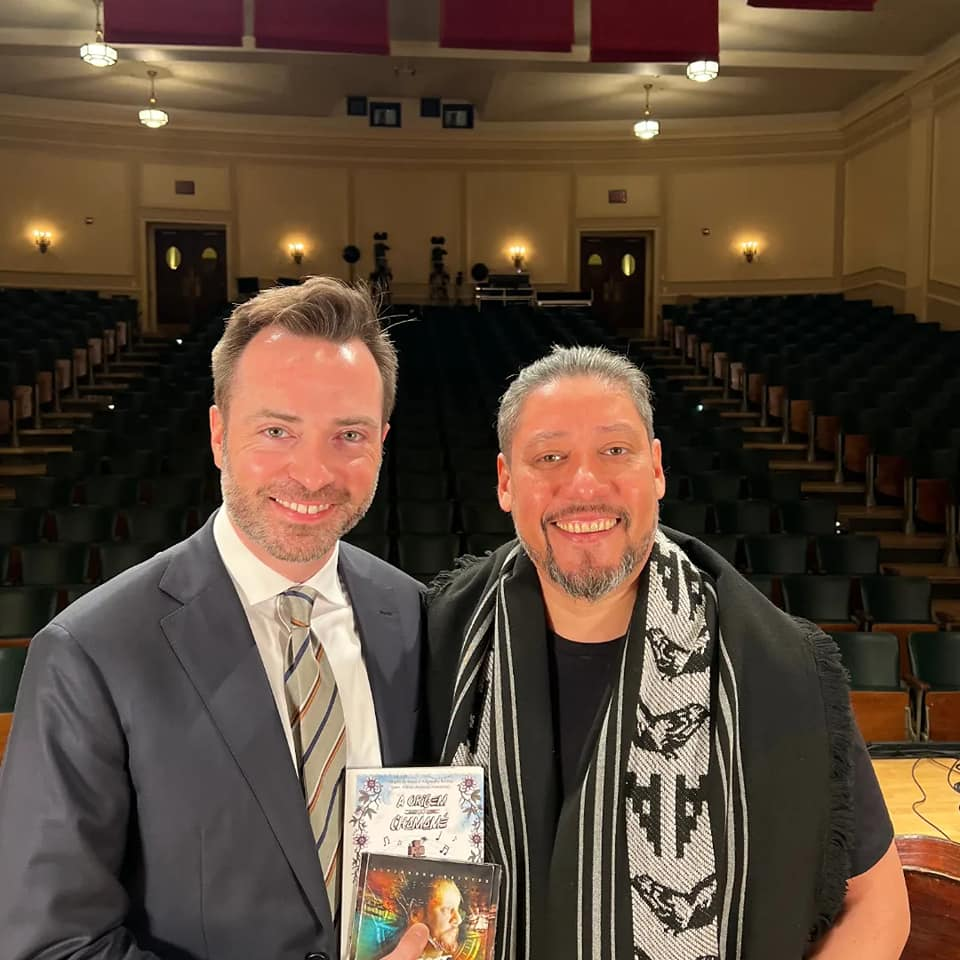
Alejandro Brittes with Douglas Peach

In 2021, he was invited as a soloist by the "Orquestra Sinfônica de Campo Grande", Mato Grosso do Sul, to perform in the concert "100 años de Ástor Piazzola" of the "Encontro com a Música Clássica", Brazil. That same year he published his first book: "A origen do Chamamé – Uma historia para ser contada", in both Portuguese and Spanish, consisting of results of an anthropological research project about the Chamamé rhythm, carried out by him and producer Magali de Rossi.

In July 2022 he realized the project "Ponto e Pianada – Ponto de Encontro", together with Argentine accordionist Chango Spasiuk, in 8 performances in Rio Grande do Sul and Santa Catarina. The main performance took place at the Theatro São Pedro in Porto Alegre, Brazil.

In September 2022, he released his ninth album, a double album titled "(L)ESTE". The "A" disc was arranged and adapted by the conductor and harpsichordist Fernando Cordella, with the participation of a Baroque chamber orchestra; the "B" disc is composed of traditional chamamés.

In 2023 he became the first Chamamé accordionist to play at the Library Of Congress in the United States of America.

In 2023 he went on an extensive tour across the United States of America with support from the Ibermusicas and Mid Atlantic Arts program, playing in 30 venues such as: Library Of Congress, Embassy Of Argentina, Georgetown University and Queens Theatre.

In 2024, he performed over 50 shows on the West Coast of the United States. Playing at venues such as San Jose Jazz Festival, CA, Cotati Accordion Festival, CA and Richard Nixon Library & Museum, CA.

In December 2025, Alejandro Brittes and the Baroque Orchestra, conducted by Fernando Cordella, participated in the opening events of the Rio Grande do Sul Legislative Assembly’s commemorations of the 400th anniversary of the Jesuit–Guaraní Missions. The performances formed part of the Sarau do Solar project and took place on December 13 and 14 in Santo Ângelo and São Miguel das Missões, respectively, with the participation of the Jerojy Mbaraete Guaraní Choir from the Tekoa Koenjú village and poetry reciter Adriana Braun. The Santo Ângelo performance marked the project’s first edition outside the state capital.

In February 2026, Alejandro Brittes was announced as the opening performer for the Instituto Estadual de Música’s program commemorating the 400th anniversary of the Jesuit–Guaraní Missions. The institute is affiliated with the Rio Grande do Sul Department of Culture. The (L)ESTE concert, scheduled for February 24 at the Theatro Simões Lopes Neto in Porto Alegre, featured the Baroque Orchestra, conducted by Fernando Cordella.

In September 2026, Alejandro Brittes and cultural producer Magali de Rossi coordinated an official cultural mission to Washington, D.C., marking the 400th anniversary of the Jesuit–Guaraní Missions. Participants included Rio Grande do Sul’s Secretary of Culture, André Kryszczun, and the Department of Culture’s Director-General and Administrative Director, Fabrício Marquezin Covcecich. The initiative received support from the Pró-Cultura RS Artistic Mobility Program.

The program included a performance of (L)ESTE at The Catholic University of America and activities at the Organization of American States and the Library of Congress. Publications concerning the history and heritage of the missions were also presented to the Library of Congress and the Oliveira Lima Library.

Alejandro Brittes is a voting member of the Latin Academy of Recording Arts and Sciences – Latin Grammy (2023)

== Research on the of Chamamé ==
Accordionist and composer Alejandro Brittes conducts research into the historical origins of Chamamé, with particular attention to the contributions of the Indigenous Guaraní peoples and the influence of Baroque music introduced by Jesuit missionaries in the 30 Jesuit-Guaraní missions established in the lowlands of South America.

In 2021, he co-authored the book A Origem do Chamamé – Uma história para ser contada (The Origin of Chamamé – A Story to Be Told) with researcher and cultural producer Magali de Rossi. The publication resulted from an investigation combining archival research, fieldwork, and engagement with Guaraní communities. Grounded in the theoretical framework of New Cultural History, the study presents a historical and ethnomusicological approach to the formation of the genre, addressing both academic audiences and readers interested in the history of Chamamé.

This research is also reflected in Brittes's musical work, particularly in his 2022 album (L)ESTE. The repertoire combines original compositions with interpretations of historical works, including two pieces by Domenico Zipoli, Largo and Allegro. The project establishes a dialogue between Chamamé and Baroque music, exploring their historical and cultural connections through contemporary arrangements and interpretations.

Brittes's research and its relationship to his artistic work have been discussed in Brazilian publications and by the Library of Congress in the United States.

== Critical reception ==
In Italy, L’Adigetto wrote in 2013 that one of Alejandro Brittes’s principal achievements was introducing “a new interpretation of the tradition and rhythms of the Argentine littoral”, while preserving the style and distinctive characteristics of chamamé. The publication also highlighted the relationship between his training in folk and classical music.

In Argentina, Zélika Alarcón de Tamaño, writing in El Debate Pregón in 2018, praised the accordionist’s “clarity of sound and flawless fingering”. Reviewing the recital, she highlighted “his expressive ability, his authenticity in every performance, his personal style”, alongside the technique and chromaticism evident in his playing.

In Brazil, Juarez Fonseca reviewed (L)ESTE for GZH in December 2022, writing that Brittes took his work “beyond the usual or expected standards” and adding: “Almost everything here is surprising.” The review discussed the research into chamamé underlying the project and Fernando Cordella’s contribution to its arrangements and Baroque instrumentation. In January 2023, Ricardo Romanoff of Matinal highlighted “the sense of belonging inherent in chamamé, which crosses borders to become part of the musical expression of different South American cultures”, connecting Brittes’s research with the creation of the album.

In the United States, Kevin McEneaney of The Millbrook Independent described Brittes as "an accordion virtuoso" in an October 2023 review of a quartet performance at the Stissing Center. The critic found “charm, cheer, whimsy, and sunny generosity” in the music and highlighted the orchestral effects and cohesion of the four musicians. In August 2024, Andrew Gilbert of San Francisco Classical Voice called Brittes's performance with percussionist Brian Rice "the festival's most unanticipated delight" and described their duo concert as "consistently fascinating". Gilbert also praised Brittes for introducing each piece with "just the right amount of information and commentary".

Juliana Bublitz of GZH described Brittes’s Library of Congress performance as “quite a feat” in an article published on October 2, 2023. On September 24, 2026, she described him as an “accordion virtuoso”. Also in 2026, Benno Kist of Gazeta do Sul, reviewing a performance with the Unisc Chamber Orchestra, wrote that the musicians’ playing and Brittes’s arrangements created “a true human and divine connection, through the universe”.

In an institutional assessment published on the Library of Congress’s Folklife Today blog in February 2024, American Folklife Center specialist Douglas D. Peach described Brittes as “one of this generation’s most accomplished tradition bearers”. The Consulate General of Argentina in New York, in a publication announcing a quartet performance, described him as “one of the most relevant contemporary innovators and ambassadors of chamamé”.

== Reception in academic settings ==
In a September 2024 Stanford Live publication, artistic programs producer Albert Montañez-Sanchez stated: “The first time I listened to Alejandro’s chamamé Mi Cielo (My Sky), I was instantly transported to the Southern Cone of South America—a region steeped in nostalgia and melodies reminiscent of Piazzolla, Ginastera, and Gardel.”

In October of the same year, Stanford University hosted El origen del Chamamé — Una historia para ser contada, a discussion with Brittes at Bolivar House. Conducted in Spanish and livestreamed, the event explored the origins of chamamé and the research presented in his book A Origem do Chamamé. The discussion included musical performances with André Ely and Carlos Eduardo de Césaro and was organized in collaboration with Stanford Live.

Georgetown University professor Anthony DelDonna highlighted the ensemble’s work in preserving chamamé: “[T]he students left the class visit and the performance impressed with the breadth and depth of the ensemble’s preservation of chamamé.” His testimonial was reproduced by the University of Arizona’s Center for Latin American Studies. The Alejandro Brittes Quartet’s participation in Georgetown’s music program was also documented in the university’s Georgetown Magazine.

Gustavo Ahualli of the Latin American Music Center at The Catholic University of America stated: “The exceptional artistry and musicianship made it an unforgettable experience for our students, and I would say also to our community as a whole.”

Michelle Reiser-Memmer of Hamilton College assessed the performance as follows: "I present a lot of concerts throughout the year, and this one stands out as a highlight".

TOArts' 2024–2025 annual report documented the Alejandro Brittes Trio’s activities at Oxnard High School, Newbury Park High School, and Westlake High School in California. According to the organization, "The Alejandro Brittes Trio introduced students to traditional chamamé music through full concerts at each school, sharing the rich cultural and historical significance of this Argentinian genre".

In Brazil, Jornal do Comércio highlighted the educational dimension of Brittes’s 2023 United States tour: "In his lectures, Alejandro Brittes brings his work as a researcher to the forefront and introduces American university students to the origins of a musical genre that embodies much of Latin American culture and history". The article reported that the activities were intended for humanities and music students and addressed the research presented in A Origem do Chamamé — Uma história para ser contada, co-authored with Magali de Rossi.

== Discography ==
=== Albums ===
- Por La senda Chamamecera (1991)
- A la Luz del Candil (1992)
- Ganadores de Oro de Pre Cosquin (1996)
- Pal' Taconeo (1998)
- Por la misma senda (2006)
- Herencia Chamamecera (2008)
- Puro chamamé (2010)
- El Viento y las Hojas (2013)
- (L)ESTE (2022)

=== Singles ===
- "Raíces del Alma" featuring Raúl Barboza (2019)
- "Laberintos" (2022)
- "La colorada" (2022)
- "Un Mate y la distancia" (2022)
- "Ala Ancha" (2022)
- "Maga" (2023)
- "Terracota" (2023)
- "15 de Mayo" (2023)
- "Agreste Bermejo" (2023)
- "El Carau" (2024)

=== Compilation albums ===
- Puro Chamamé (2010)

=== Collaborations ===
Shared discography

- La Cantora, Luisa Calcumil (2008)
- Sencillo "Caravana Chamamecera", Os Fagundes and Elton Saldanha (2015)

Miscellaneous

- "Todo Pasa" and "Don't say tomorrow" 3er arco, Los Piojos (1996)
- "Vals inicial" and "Y quemás", Azul, Los Piojos (1998)
- "El Alma del Chaco", Andres Zito, production and direction Antonio Tarragó Ros (1999)
- "El macho del siglo", Música maestro, Antonio Ríos (2001)
- "Lejos", La Chicana (2006)
- "Qué Será..." Satán Bemol, Pol Neiman (2006)
- "El Anhelo de tu pañuelo", Íntimamente, Julia Verdi, arrangements and production by Nicolás "Colacho" Brizuela (2009)
- "Garzas Viajeras", Cosecha de Luz, Alejandra Noya (2016)
- "Coração de Chamamé y “Recorrendo", Motivos de Campo, Jorge Freitas (2009)
- "Chamamé", varios músicos (2010)
- "Querencia de Gauchada", Jari Terres (2010)
- "Te conto porque volto", Comparsa Musiqueira, various musicians (2010)
- "Estrela do coração" and "Amanhecer" Nossa Terra, Nossa Gente, Antônio Gringo (2011)
- "Alma Costeira" and "Verdulera", Canto e Cordeona, Robison Boeira (2014)
- "De Don Chico a Don Brittes", Lida Campeira, Eduardo Vargas (2017)
- "El Sembrador", Coração de minha gente, Diego Muller y Érlon Péricles, Vol 2 (2020)

=== Published books ===
- A Origem do Chamamé - Uma história para ser contada - DE ROSSI and BRITTES (2021)
- Sistema González | Button accordion method - A. BRITTES (2024)

=== Audiovisual production ===
- DVD "Encontro Internacional de Chamameceros", produced by Magali de Rossi, various musicians (2008)
- "Pindo Hovy", music video with Raul Barboza and Nardo Gonzales, the Elo Sul project (2020)
- WebDoc (L)ESTE (2022)
- Music videos of three compositions: "Vientos del Este", "Caiboaté" and "El Viento y las hojas" for the Americas Society, New York City – US, distributed by AS/COA (2023).
- Video of the Alejandro Brittes Quartet: Masters of Chamamé concert at the Library Of Congress in the United States produced by the American Folklife center on September 21, 2023.
- Live broadcasts of the (L)ESTE concert—featuring Alejandro Brittes and a baroque orchestra, in celebration of the 400th anniversary of the Jesuit-Guarani Missions—via TV Assembleia of the State of Rio Grande do Sul (2026)
