= Esquivando Charcos =

Studio album by La Renga
- Released: 1991; July 1998 (re-release)
- Recorded: Sonovisión, 1989–1991
- Genre: Rock
- Length: 35:50
- Label: Self-released (1991); PolyGram (1998)
- Producer: La Renga

La Renga chronology
Esquivando Charcos (1991)	A Dónde Me Lleva La Vida (1994)

Esquivando Charcos is the first album by Argentine band La Renga. Until 1991 it was only available in cassette and it was not available in music shops, although the live versions of these songs (along with a few other tracks) can be heard in the album Bailando En Una Pata. It was recorded, distributed and produced in a totally independent way by the band.

The album was included in a US-only collection called Clásicos del Rock en Español without the band's knowledge and with different artwork.

== Background ==
Since the band did not have a company to produce the album, they decided to do it themselves (record, distribution and production). They made 1000 copies, which they sold at their concerts. With the great progress the band made, when they became famous (after releasing their fourth album Despedazado por Mil Partes), PolyGram suggested to them that it should be re-released. After some doubts, they decided that it was a good idea and in 1998 Esquivando Charcos was available in stores. The album achieved platinum status in Argentina that year.

== Track listing ==
All songs by Gustavo Napoli. Tracks 5 and 9 are rehearsals recorded "live" (actually with overdubbed audience) in the studio itself.

1. "Somos Los Mismos de Siempre" [We are the Same Ones as we Always Were] - 3:14
2. "Moscas Verdes Para El Charlatán" [Green Flies for the Quack] - 4:11
3. "Embrollos, Fatos y Paquetes" [Tricks, Facts and Packages] - 4:32
4. "Luciendo Mi Saquito Blusero" [Wearing my Blouse Coat] - 3:10
5. "Voy a Bailar a La Nave del Olvido" [I'm Going Dancing to Oblivion Ship] - 4:00
6. "Buseca y Vino Tinto" [Buseca and Red Wine] - 3:04
7. "El Juicio del Ganso" [The Goose's Trial] - 4:57
8. "Negra Mi Alma, Negro Mi Corazón" [Black is my soul, black is my heart] - 4:05
9. "Blues de Bolivia" [Bolivia's blues] - 4:44

== Personnel ==
- Chizzo - lead vocals, rhythm guitar
- Locura - lead guitar
- Tete - bass guitar
- Tanque - drums

=== Guest musicians ===
- Chiflo - saxophone

=== Additional personnel ===
- Alvaro Villagra - mixing
