= Detonador de Sueños =

Studio album by La Renga
- Released: October 17, 2003
- Recorded: 2003
- Genre: Heavy metal, hard rock
- Label: Soy Rock
- Producer: La Renga

La Renga chronology
Insoportablemente Vivo (2001)	Detonador de Sueños (2003)	TruenoTierra (2006)

Detonador de Sueños is the seventh studio album by Argentine hard rock band La Renga. It contains hits like "A Tu Lado" and "La Razón Que Te Demora". It was the first album released through the band's own label, La Renga Discos.

This album has a raw sound, which according to the band is a product of the situation that Argentina was living in when they recorded it. For example, the song "Hielasangre" is a reference to police repression and when the song is played in live concerts, images of the December 2001 riots are shown.

The album has an instrumental hidden track, called "Pasto Tomado", which was recorded and mixed by Gonzalo Villagra, bass guitar player of Los Natas.

== Track listing ==
All songs by Gustavo Nápoli

1. "A Tu Lado" [By your side] – 3:16
2. "Detonador de Sueños" [Dream detonator] – 2:10
3. "El Ojo del Huracan" [The eye of the hurricane] – 3:54
4. "La Razon Que Te Demora" [The reason that takes you] – 4:24
5. "Dementes en El Espacio" [Demented in space] – 3:22
6. "Estado" [Status] – 3:04
7. "Las Cosas Que Hace" [The things he does] – 4:19
8. "Noche Vudú" [Voodoo night] – 3:20
9. "En Los Brazos del Sol" [In the arms of the sun] – 5:06
10. "Miralos" [Look at these] – 4:51
11. "El Rastro de La Conciencia" [The trail of consciousness] – 3:27
12. "Hielasangre" [Bloodhound] – 17:30
13. Pasto Tomado (Hidden track after Hielasangre)

== Personnel ==
- Chizzo - lead vocals, lead guitar
- Tete - bass guitar
- Tanque - drums
- Chiflo - saxophone, trumpet
- Manu - saxophone, harmonica, backing vocals

=== Additional personnel ===
- Alvaro Villagra - mixing, mastering
- Claudio Romandini - assistant engineer

== Tour ==
The album's tour began on November 8, 2003, and ended on January 21, 2006. As part of the tour, the band in 2004 toured Europe for the second time, starting its tour of the European continent on May 1. Days before, the band gave a performance in the estadio de River before more than 65,000 people.
