= Los Piojos =

Argentine rock band

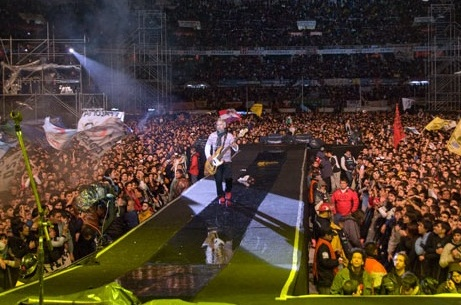
- Los Piojos during their last concert at the River Plate Stadium. Buenos Aires, 2009

Background information
- Origin: El Palomar, Buenos Aires, Argentina
- Genres: Rock, Hard rock, Blues, Tango, Funk, Ska, Reggae
- Years active: 1988–2009; 2024–present
- Labels: Distribuidora Belgrano Norte, El Farolito Discos
- Members: Andrés Ciro Martínez; Daniel "Piti" Fernández; Sebastián "Roger" Cardero; Juan Gigena Ábalos
- Past members: Miguel Ángel "Micky" Rodríguez; Gustavo "Tavo" Kupinski †; Juan Ignacio "Juanchi" Bisio; Daniel Buira †; Pablo Guerra

Los Piojos (Spanish: The Lice) is an Argentine rock band. Extremely popular, it became one of the seminal bands of the 1990s Argentine music scene.

Unlike most suburban outfits, however, their style evolved significantly with each successive album, not only developing a unique style for the band but also incorporating elements of murga, candombe, and tango to an electric guitar base. This plus frontman Ciro's songwriting has made them one of the most popular bands in modern Argentine rock, with a strong following across Latin America and Europe, unusual for a band in their subgenre of Argentine rock.

== History ==
The band's origins can be traced to 1987 when a bunch of friends from different cities decided to try playing music. They began doing so in the pubs of the western suburbs of Buenos Aires, a similar beginning as other suburban rock bands. In 1991, they headed to Europe to participate in an anti-racist music festival in France, where they played with groups from Mali, Burkina Faso, Cuba, and Spain.

Los Piojos made their commercial debut in 1992 with Chactuchac which was received favorably by Patricio Rey y sus Redonditos de Ricota.

Ay Ay Ay followed in 1994, and both sold reasonably well and Ciro's songwriting was beginning to develop. However, the band's success was hampered by the domination by the Nuevo Rock Argentino rock ("New Argentine Rock") of the first half of the 1990s.

The band's third studio album, Tercer Arco, benefited from the suburban rock explosion of 1996: that year alone La Renga released their seminal album Despedazado por Mil Partes, Viejas Locas released their debut with the hit single "Intoxicado", among other events that sent suburban rock to the mainstream and ended new Argentine rock's dominance.

By the second half of the year Los Piojos were filling arenas and small stadiums. And by the start of 1997, Tercer Arco had gone double-platinum. The single "El Farolito" was at the top of rotation in most radio stations, and the video for "Maradó" (about former football player Diego Maradona) as well as that for "Verano del 92" made top 10 on MTV.

With 1998's follow up studio album, Azul, the band's assimilation of all types of eastern Argentine musical rhythms became clear. Their eclectic nature did not cut into their popularity; in fact, it made them more accessible to a wider Latin American taste, and so Los Piojos went on tour in Mexico and the United States. Ritual saw the light in 1999 as the fifth album for the band.

The new millennium arrived and saw Los Piojos still active. They performed several concerts with sellout numbers alongside other suburban rock acts such as Divididos, La Renga, Viejas Locas, and ska-Latin band Los Auténticos Decadentes.

The group released Verde Paisaje del Infierno in 2000. At the same year, Daniel Buira, the drummer, left the group after a fight with Kupinski.

At the end of 2002 they released Huracanes en Luna Plateada, with 19 songs recorded in concerts performed in the Huracán stadium, Luna Park, the Sports Center of Gymnastics and Fencing of La Plata, Rosario, Neuquén, Córdoba and Mendoza. All of these were recorded in the concerts between the years 2001 and 2002.

In 2003 the band came out with their 7th full-length, Máquina de Sangre. It became one of the best selling Argentinian albums of the year. The band would also sell out 70,000 seat River Plate Stadium, something only achieved locally by bands such as Soda Stereo, and the most important foreign musical acts. The album included the song "Motumbo" which was composed by former drummer Daniel Buira.

In 2004 the group went on their first international tour to Spain.

In 2005 the Los Piojos were awarded the Konex Award as one of the best rock bands of the decade.

The band's first DVD, Fantasmas peleándole al viento, was released in October 2006. Its title, taken from a lyric in the song "Cruel," compiled live performances from three of their concerts: Boca Juniors Stadium in December 2005, Estadio Ciudad de La Plata in November 2004, and the outdoor stage at Obras Sanitarias in October 2005.

In May 2007 they released their second DVD called "Desde lejos no se ve".

On August the same year they released their ninth album "Civilización", The band presented the album by playing it on a truck along corrientes avenue in Buenos Aires.

In 2008 they were nominated to the Gardel Awards 2008 in the categories "Best Rock Band", "Best Rock Album"; "Best Cover Design", "Song of the Year" (for "Pacific") and "Album of the Year". They were awarded "Best Rock Album" for their album Civilización.

A key turning point in the band's history occurred in September 2008 when founding member and guitarist Daniel "Piti" Fernández departed from Los Piojos after 20 years. Fernández, who was an instrumental composer and the author of popular songs like "Bicho de Ciudad," left the group to dedicate himself fully to his personal project, La Franela. His exit, which followed a period of reported internal tensions and disagreements over the band's structure and finances, was a significant event that preceded the group's eventual dissolution the following year.

Guitarist Juanchi Bisio was announced as the replacement for Daniel "Piti" Fernández, taking on the lead guitar role for the final phase of the band's history. Bisio, who was the leader of the combo Catimbao, played with Los Piojos until their final concert in May 2009.

=== Splitting up ===
After years of rumors fueled by internal tensions and the prior departure of guitarist Daniel "Piti" Fernández, Los Piojos announced an "indefinite pause" in April 2009. The overwhelming demand for tickets to their farewell show, which was initially planned for the Club Ciudad de Buenos Aires, forced the band to move the concert to the larger Estadio Monumental de River Plate. This final performance, a massive event known as the "Último Ritual" (Last Ritual), took place on May 30, 2009, bringing an end to the band's 20-year career.

=== Life after the separation ===
Shortly after the band broke up, Andrés Ciro formed a new band called Ciro y Los Persas.

Sebastian Cardero formed a band called "El Vuelo De la Grulla" (the flight of the crane) with his brother. Both later joined Daniel "Piti" Fernández's band La Franela.

In January 2011, Gustavo Kupinski, the band's guitarist was killed in a car accident. Kupinski lost control of his car on route 63, close to Buenos Aires. His wife and two daughters, 2 and 4 years old, were with him in the car at the time of the accident. His wife was killed on the spot, his daughters were hospitalised, his young daughter died in the hospital a week later.

In 2023, Micky, Dani Buira and Chucky started a new band called Ritual 87 where they played their version of the Los Piojos songs. The number 87 refers to the year in which Log Piojos was founded.

Buira died on 21 March 2026, aged 54.

== Band members ==
Current members

- Andrés Ciro Martínez: vocals, harmonica, and rhythm guitar
- Juanchi Bisio: lead guitar
- Sebastián "Roger" Cardero: drums
- Miguel Ángel "Micky" Rodríguez: bass, backing vocals

Live Only

- Facundo "Changuíto" Farías Gómez: percussion
- Miguel "Chucky" De Ipola: keyboards

Former members

- Daniel Buira: drums (died 2026)
- Gustavo Kupinski: lead guitar (died 2011)
- Daniel "Piti" Fernández: guitar

== Discography ==
=== Studio albums ===
- Chactuchac (1992)
- Ay Ay Ay (1994)
- Tercer arco (1996)
- Azul (1998)
- Verde paisaje del Infierno (2000)
- Máquina de sangre (2003)
- Civilización (2007)

=== Live albums ===
- Ritual (1999)
- Huracanes en Luna plateada (2002)
- Ritual Piojoso (2024)

=== Compilations ===
Sources:

- 1989 - 2003 (2003)
- Los Piojos: Edición Limitada! [CD+DVD] (2008)

=== Videos ===
- Fantasmas peleándole al viento (2006)
- Desde lejos no se ve (2007)
