= Insoportablemente Vivo =

InsoportablemENte VIVO

Live album by La Renga
- Released: 2001
- Recorded: Huracán Stadium, Buenos Aires, Argentina, May 19, 2001
- Genres: Hard rock Rock
- Label: Universal Music
- Producers: Ricardo Mollo; La Renga

La Renga chronology
| La Esquina del Infinito (2000) | InsoportablemENte VIVO (2001) | Detonador de Sueños (2003) |

InsoportablemENte VIVO is the seventh album and the second live album by Argentine hard rock band La Renga. It was recorded at the Huracán Athletic Club Stadium on May 19, 2001. It has two unedited songs: Un Tiempo Fuera De Casa and Oportunidad Oportuna. It achieved 2× platinum status in Argentina for sales in excess of 80,000 copies.

A live DVD was released in 2004. A movie was made of the Huracán concert and also shows moments of the band's history.

== Track listing ==
All songs by Gustavo Napoli except Hey, Hey, My, My (Neil Young):

Disc 1:

1. "Panic Show"
2. "Motoralmaisangre"
3. "Al Que He Sangrado"
4. "Bien Alto"
5. "Cuando Vendrán"
6. "En El Baldío"
7. "El Mambo de la Botella"
8. "Blues Cardíaco"
9. "El Terco"
10. "En Pie"
11. "El Cielo del Desengaño"
12. "Lo Frágil de la Locura"
13. "Un Tiempo Fuera de Casa"
14. "La Vida, Las Mismas Calles"
15. "El Twist del Pibe"
16. "El Hombre de la Estrella"

Disc 2:

1. "Paja Brava"
2. "Oportunidad Oportuna"
3. "2+2=3"
4. "Arte Infernal"
5. "El Circo Romano"
6. "Cuando Estés Acá"
7. "La Balada del Diablo y La Muerte"
8. "El Rey de la Triste Felicidad"
9. "El Final Es En Donde Partí"
10. "Me Hice Canción"
11. "Pcilocybe Mexicana"
12. "El Revelde"
13. "Estalla"
14. "Hey Hey, My My"
15. "Hablando de la Libertad"

== Personnel ==
- Chizzo - lead vocals, lead guitar
- Tete - bass guitar
- Tanque - drums
- Chiflo - saxophone, trumpet
- Manu - saxophone, harmonica, quena, rhythm guitar, backing vocals

=== Guest musicians ===
- Pablo Martinián - keyboards (tracks 6 and 11, disc 1; 3 and 4, disc 2)
- Ricardo Mollo - guitar (track 10, disc 1)
- Pappo - guitar (track 14, disc 2)
- Juan Cruz Fernández - wind instruments (tracks 8 and 9, disc 1)
- Leopoldo Janín - wind instruments (tracks 8 and 9, disc 1)

=== Additional personnel ===
- Gustavo Borner - recording technician, mixing, mastering
- Gabriel Goncalvez - manager
- Alejandro Vasquez - A&R
