= 3er arco =

Studio album by Los Piojos
- Released: August 31, 1996
- Recorded: June–July 1996
- Genres: Rock; blues; tango; candombe; ska
- Length: 53:21
- Label: DBN
- Producer: Alfredo Toth

Los Piojos chronology
Ay Ay Ay (1994)	3er arco (1996)	Azul (1998)

3er arco (3rd arch) is the third album by Argentine rock band Los Piojos. Recorded and mixed between June and July in 1996 at Del Cielito Records. It was officially presented at the Arpegios Theatre. Two concerts at the Estadio Obras in September, two concerts at the Microestadio de Ferro in November and three more concerts at the Estadio Obras in December.

It is included in "The 100 best argentine rock albums" as listed on the Rolling Stone magazine.

== Reception ==
The Allmusic review by Stephen Thomas Erlewine awarded the album 4 stars stating "3er Arco finds the Argentinean band Los Piojos -- composed of Daniel "Piti" Fernandez, Daniel Buira, Miguel Angel "Micky" Rodriguez, Gustavo Kupinski and Andres Ciro Martinez—at the peak of their form, turning out an imaginative fusion of Latin rhythms and hard rock. It's their finest moment to date and the best way to become acquainted with the band. ".

Professional ratings
Review scores
Source	Rating
AllMusic	4/5 stars

== Track listing ==
1. "Esquina Libertad" [Libertad corner] – 4:37
2. "Taxi boy" [Rent boy] – 4:05
3. "El farolito" [Little Streetlamp] – 4:13
4. "Shup – Shup" – 3:26
5. "Al atardecer" [At dusk] – 4:43
6. "Qué decís" [What do you say] – 4:21
7. "Don't Say Tomorrow" – 3:37
8. "Todo pasa" [Everything happens] – 5:33
9. "Intro Maradó" [Maradó intro] – 0:46
10. "Maradó" [Maradó] – 3:58
11. "Gris" [Grey] – 5:05
12. "Muevelo" [Move it] – 4:16
13. "Verano del '92" [Summer of '92] – 4:41

== Personnel ==
- Adrián Bilbao – engineer, mixing
- Alejandro Brittes – accordion
- Dani Buira – drums, percussion, backing vocals
- Daniel Fernández – guitar, backing vocals
- Gustavo H. Kupinski – guitar
- Andrés Ciro Martínez – guitar, harmonica, vocals, backing vocals
- Andrés Mayo – mastering
- Guillermina Montello – photography
- Martin Pomares – assistant engineer
- Micki Rodriguez – photography
- Miguel A. Rodriguez – bass, backing vocals
- Alfredo Toth – producer, backing vocals
