= Beto Quintanilla =

Mexican singer (1948–2007)

- Born: Norberto Quintanilla Iracheta; May 23, 1948; General Terán, Nuevo León, Mexico
- Died: March 18, 2007 (aged 58); Reynosa, Tamaulipas, Mexico
- Resting place: Panteón Valle de la Paz in Reynosa, Tamaulipas
- Other names: Beto Quintanilla; "El Mero León del Corrido"
- Occupations: Singer, songwriter
- Height: 180 cm (5 ft 11 in)
- Spouse: Blanca Alicia Reyes
- Relatives: Perla Quintanilla (niece); Chuy Quintanilla (brother)

Norberto "Beto" Quintanilla Iracheta (May 23, 1948 – March 18, 2007) was a Regional Mexican singer and songwriter. He was known as "El Mero León del Corrido" (The Top Lion of the Corrido).

== Biography ==
Beto Quintanilla was originally from General Terán, a small town in Nuevo León. As a child, Quintanilla composed poems or odes to his mother, his teacher, his school, and his country. He left school after only a year of secondary education in order to work in fields alongside his father and his five brothers. His extended family also included three male relatives and two women. The farm was not enough to support the entire family and when he was 13 years old, young Beto relocated to Reynosa, Tamaulipas, where he had found a job milking cows. He did this for a year, and then worked with an aunt in a clothing store for several years.

Quintanilla never had any formal musical training. Although he had always written poetry and songs, musical instruments and musical training were scarce, and he knew few musicians. However, at some time during his life on the ranch, he did meet a pair of musicians who played bajo sexto and accordion. He began writing songs for them, and then songs for other groups. Eventually he came to the attention of Ruben Polanco, the artistic director of a record company, and Polanco encouraged him to sing his songs himself. Apparently Quintanilla initially objected that he did not know how to sing and felt out of place when he sang. Polanco told him not to waste time with excuses, that he (Polanco) wanted to sign artists like Quintanilla, and that he (Quintanilla) had a unique style and presence.

Quintanilla died in Reynosa on March 18, 2007. The cause of death was a heart attack, said to be related to a drug overdose.

== Discography ==
"Unfortunately during his life time, his early recordings and records were not documented leaving behind unknown discos and unmarked years"

- Reto en la Frontera (1980)
- Beto Quintanilla y Su Grupo (1980)
- La Carga del Diablo (1980)
- Un Tiro En La Espalda (1982)
- La Celda Olvidada (1984)
- Beto Quintanilla El Leon del Corrido (1984)
- El Judicial Federal (1985)
- Al Filo de la Navaja (1986)
- Narco Encanonados (1986)
- Las Pacas De a Kilo (1990)
- Pobrecita Huerfanita (1992)
- El Cuerno de Chivo (1993)
- La Carrera del Chucho (1994)
- Patrulla de Blanco y Negro (1996)
- El Ratoncito Orejon (1997)
- El Ondeao (1997)
- Trans AM 98 (1998)
- El Pescado Enjabonado (1999)
- Pa' Cantar Hay Que Ser Gallo (1999)
- Pobreza Infeliz (2000)
- El Mero Leon del Corrido (2000)
- El Gordo Paz (2001)
- Libertad de Expression (2002)
- Le Compre La Muerte A Mi Hijo (2003)
- Mi Vida En Canciones (2003)
- Los Angeles Van Al Cielo (2004)
- Gallo Fino (2004)
- Abandone a Mi Amigo (2005)
- Mi Hijo No Es un Cobarde (2006)

Released After His Death:

- La Santisima Muerte (2008)
