= Máquina de sangre =

Studio album by Los Piojos
- Released: November 14, 2003
- Recorded: August – September 2003
- Studio: Del Abasto al Pasto
- Genre: Rock, hard rock, ska, tango
- Length: 59:39
- Language: Spanish
- Label: El Farolito Discos
- Producer: Andrés Ciro Martínez, Alfredo Toth

Los Piojos chronology
Huracanes en Luna Plateada (2002)	Máquina de sangre (2003)	Civilización (2007)

Máquina de sangre (Blood machine) is the sixth studio album by Argentine rock band Los Piojos, released in 2003.

== Track listing ==
1. «Fantasma» [Ghost]
2. «Guadalupe» [Guadalupe]
3. «Como Alí» [Like Alí]
4. «Langostas» [Lobsters]
5. «Sudestada» [Sudestada]
6. «Motumbo» [Motumbo]
7. «Entrando en tu Ciudad» [Entering Your City]
8. «Amor de Perros» [Love of Dogs]
9. «Solo y en Paz» [Alone and Peacefully]
10. «Dientes de Cordero» [Lamb Teeth]
11. «Al Desierto» [To the Desert]
12. «Canción de Cuna» [Lullaby]
13. «No Parés» [Don't Stop]
