= Civilización =

Studio album by Los Piojos
- Released: 2007
- Genre: Rock, hard rock
- Label: El Farolito Discos
- Producer: Pablo Guyot; Alfredo Toth

Los Piojos chronology
Máquina de sangre (2003)	Civilización (2007)

Civilización (Civilization) is the ninth and last album by Argentine rock band Los Piojos, released in 2007.

== Track listing ==
1. Manjar [Delicacy]
2. Pacífico [Pacific]
3. Civilización [Civilization]
4. Bicho de ciudad [City bug]
5. Pollo viejo [Old chicken]
6. Cruces y flores [Crosses and flowers]
7. Difícil [Difficult]
8. Un buen día [A good day]
9. Basta de penas [No more sorrows]
10. Unbekannt [Unbekannt]
11. Salitral [Saltpetrous]
12. Hoy es hoy [Today is today]
13. Buenos días, Palomar [Good morning Palomar]
