= Azul (Los Piojos album) =

Studio album by Los Piojos
- Released: 1998
- Recorded: February – March 1998
- Genres: Rock, blues, candombe, ska
- Label: DBN
- Producer: Alfredo Toth

Los Piojos chronology
3er arco (1996)	Azul (1998)	Ritual (1999)

Azul (Blue) is the fourth album by Argentine rock band Los Piojos, recorded at Del Cielito Records studio and released in 1998. This work mixes candombe and murga with the traditional rhythms used by the band and was presented live in Parque Sarmiento and at the All Boys stadium.

== Reception ==
The AllMusic review by Victor W. Valdivia awarded the album 4 stars stating "Los Piojos are amazingly eclectic in their approach to music... they incorporate reggae and Caribbean rhythms, but they also show an influence of classic rock and alternative. That's not to say that they don't explore their Latin roots on various instances... The lyrics are also wide-ranging, veering from nakedly revealing self-portraits to Michael Stipe-like inscrutability. As diverse as the album gets, though, nothing ever feels forced or contrived. Azul is the only one of Los Piojos' four albums available in the U.S, but it is a superb introduction to their talent and may inspire listeners to seek out their earlier releases."

Professional ratings
Review scores
Source	Rating
AllMusic	4/5 stars

== Track listing ==
All tracks by Andrés Ciro Martínez except where noted.

1. "Vals inicial" [Initial Waltz] (Gustavo H. Kupinski, Martínez) – 5:58
2. "El balneario de los doctores crotos" [The hobo doctors beach] – 4:02
3. "Genius" [Genius] – 4:12
4. "A ver cuando" [Let's see when] (Martínez, Miguel Ángel Rodríguez) – 4:58
5. "Desde lejos no se ve" [It can't be seen from far] (Dani Buira, Kupinski, Martínez) – 4:39
6. "Sucio can" [Dirty dog] – 3:29
7. "El Rey del Blues (B. B. King)" [Blues King (B.B. King)] – 4:02
8. "Y quemás" [And you burn] – 4:50
9. "Agua" [Water] – 4:58
10. "Buenos tiempos" [Good times] (Buira, Kupinski, Martínez) – 3:58
11. "Go negro go" [Go black go] – 5:05
12. "Uoh pa pa pa" [Uoh pa pa pa] (Martínez, Fernández) – 3:03
13. "Quemado" [Burned] – 5:39
14. "Murguita" [Little murga] – 3:30
15. "Olvidate (Ya ves)" [Forget it (you see)] – 4:15
16. "Finale" [Finale] – 1:25

== Personnel ==
- Abraham Becker – violin
- Miguel Angel Bertero – violin
- Adrián Bilbao – engineer, mixing, recording technician, sampling
- Dani Buira – drums, percussion
- Javier Casalla – violin
- Juan Cruz De Urquiza – trumpet
- Alejandro Elijovich – violin
- Ciro Fogliatta – organ
- Chris Gehringer – mastering
- Andrés Ciro Martínez – cornet, backing vocals, guitar, harmonic, vocals
- Andrés Mayo – editing
- Carlos Nozzi – cello
- Martin Pomares – production assistant
- Juan "Pollo" Raffo – arranger, backing vocals, strings, director, organ
- Humberto Ridolfi – violin
- Pablo Rodríguez – sax, sax
- Mario Tenreyro – corno D
- Alfredo Toth – producer
- Patricio Villarejo – cello
- Washington Williman – violin
