= Chactuchac =

Studio album by Los Piojos
- Released: Aug 1992
- Recorded: June–August 1992
- Genre: Rock, hard rock, tango
- Length: 45:23
- Label: DBN
- Producer: Los Piojos

Los Piojos chronology
Chactuchac (1992)	Ay Ay Ay (1994)

Chactuchac is the first album by Argentine rock band Los Piojos, released in 1992.

The album was recorded and mixed by Los Piojos and Adrián Rivarola between June and August in 1992 at the Del Cielito Records studio. The main idea for the first album was to use everything they had been recording between the years of 1986 and 1992 and what they played live, their best known tracks.

The album was remastered in 2007 in Digipack format with a brand new art. Edited by El Farolito Records.

== Track listing ==
Chactuchac track listing
No.	Title	Length
1.	"Llevatelo" (Take It Away)	5:35
2.	"Chac Tu Chac"	3:38
3.	"Tan Solo" (So Lonely)	4:00
4.	"Cancheros" (Arrogants)	4:52
5.	"Los Mocosos" (The Brats)	5:00
6.	"A Veces" (Sometimes)	3:49
7.	"Blues Del Traje Gris" (Grey Suit Blues)	2:55
8.	"Yira - Yira"	3:01
9.	"Pega - Pega" (Kick Kick)	3:40
10.	"Siempre Bajando" (Always Going Down)	4:47
11.	"Cruel" (Cruel)	4:06
Total length:		50:23

== Personnel ==
- Dani Buira – drums, backing vocals, percussion
- Andrés Ciro Martínez – backing vocals, guitar, harmonica, vocals
- Gustavo Kupinski – lead guitar
- Daniel Fernández – guitar
- Miguel Ángel Rodríguez - bass
