= Verde paisaje del Infierno =

Studio album by Los Piojos
- Released: 2000
- Genre: Rock, blues, candombe, reggae, murga
- Label: El Farolito Discos
- Producer: Andrés Ciro Martínez, Ricardo Mollo

Los Piojos chronology
Ritual (1999)	Verde paisaje del Infierno (2000)	Huracanes en Luna plateada (2002)

Verde paisaje del Infierno (Green landscape of Hell) is the sixth album by Argentine rock band Los Piojos, released in 2000.

== Track listing ==
All tracks by Andrés Ciro Martínez except where noted.

1. "María y José" [Mary & Joseph] – 4:38
2. "Labios de seda" [Lips of silk] – 4:10
3. "Luz de marfil" [Ivory light] – 5:24
4. "Vine hasta aquí" [I came up here](Daniel Fernandez) – 4:38
5. "Globalización" [Globalization] – 3:43
6. "Fijate" [Look] – 3:52
7. "Reggae rojo y negro" [Red and black reggae] (Fernandez) – 4:16
8. "Ruleta" [Roulette] – 4:16
9. "Morella" [Morella] – 4:12
10. "La luna y la cabra" [The moon and the goat] – 3:30
11. "Media caña" [Half reed] – 5:14
12. "Mi babe" [My babe] – 4:42
13. "Merecido" [Deserved] – 4:13
14. "San Jauretche" [Saint Jauretche] – 5:00

== Personnel ==
- Peteco Carabajal – violin
- Sebastian "Roger" Cardero – drums, percussion, backing vocals
- Demian Chorovicz – engineer
- Fernando Dieguez – drums
- Daniel "Piti" Fernandez – guitar, backing vocals
- Chango Farías Gómez – percussion
- Gustavo Hernan Kupinski – bandoneon, guitar, backing vocals
- Nora Lezano – photography
- Andrés Ciro Martínez – audio production, backing vocals, flute, guitar, harmonic, percussion, producer, vocals
- Ricardo Mollo – guitar, vocals
- Miguel Angel Rodriguez – vocals
- Alvaro Torres – keyboards, piano
- Ricardo Troilo – engineer
