= La Renga (album) =

Studio album by La Renga
- Released: September 21, 1998
- Recorded: En Pie studios, 1998
- Genre: Rock; Hard rock
- Label: PolyGram
- Producer: Ricardo Mollo

La Renga chronology
Despedazado por Mil Partes (1996)	La Renga (1998)	La Esquina del Infinito (2000)

La Renga is a 1998 album by Argentine hard rock band La Renga. It contains the band's hits "El Revelde" and "El Twist del Pibe". The album does not have a name but the fans gave it the name of the band. The band members called it "the album of the star", because it has a big white star on the front cover. It achieved 3× platinum in Argentina for sales in excess of 180,000 copies.

Since this record, all the albums will come with special packages: cardboard, box sets, etc.

== Track listing ==
All the songs by Gustavo Nápoli except "Me Hice Canción" (Sanchez/Vera)

1. "El Terco" [The stubborn]
2. "Tripa y Corazón" [Gut and heart]
3. "Bien Alto" [So high]
4. "El Hombre de La Estrella" [The man of the star]
5. "Vende Patria Clon" [Sell clan homeland]
6. "El Revelde" [The Revel]
7. "Me Hice Canción" [I made myself song]
8. "Cuando Estes Acá" [When you are here]
9. "El Twist del Pibe" [The boy twist]
10. "Reíte" [Smile]
11. "Ser Yo" [To be me]

== Personnel ==
- Chizzo – lead vocals, lead guitar
- Tete – bass guitar
- Tanque – drums
- Chiflo – saxophone, trumpet
- Manu – saxophone, harmonica

=== Guest musicians ===
- Pablo Lando – percussion (track 7)

=== Additional personnel ===
- Gustavo Tabaré – recording technician, mixing
- Washington Borner – recording technician, mixing
- Chris Bellman – mastering
- Gabriel Goncalvez – manager
- Adrián Muscari – A&R
