= Fantasmas peleándole al viento =

Video by Los Piojos
- Released: March 2, 2006
- Recorded: 2004–2005 in Buenos Aires and La Plata, Argentina
- Genre: Rock, hard rock
- Length: 97:35
- Label: El Farolito Records
- Director: Alberto "Carpo" Cortés
- Producer: Mariela DiGiovanni Esteban Mazzoni

Los Piojos video chronology
Fantasmas peleándole al viento (2007)	Desde lejos no se ve (2008)

Fantasmas peleándole al viento, is the first DVD of the Argentinian rock band Los Piojos, which was released on March 2, 2006. The recorded live shows were taken from the ones given at the Boca Juniors's Stadium on December 22 and 23, 2005; Estadio Ciudad de La Plata, on November 27, 2004, and Obras Sanitarias Stadium, on October 7, 2005.

== Track listing ==
1. Fantasma
2. Babilonia
3. Te diria
4. Taxi boy
5. Pistolas
6. Angelito
7. Guadalupe (With Rubén Rada)
8. Ruleta
9. Media caña
10. Motumbo
11. Marado (With Diego Maradona)
12. El viejo
13. Morella
14. Todo pasa
15. Y quemás
