= La Esquina del Infinito =

Studio album by La Renga
- Released: August 11, 2000
- Recorded: Del Abasto al Pasto studios, May–June 2000
- Genre: Rock; Hard rock
- Label: PolyGram
- Producer: Ricardo Mollo; La Renga

La Renga chronology
| La Renga (1998) | La Esquina del Infinito (2000) | Insoportablemente Vivo (2001) |

La Esquina del Infinito is a 2000 album released by Argentine hard rock band La Renga. It achieved platinum status in Argentina for sales in excess of 60,000 copies.

== Track listing ==
All songs by Gustavo Nápoli except "Hey, Hey, My, My" (Neil Young) and "En Pie" (Manuel Varela)

1. "La Vida, Las Mismas Calles" [The life, the same streets]
2. "Motoralmaisangre"
3. "Al Que He Sangrado" [To which I have bled]
4. "Panic Show"
5. "El Cielo del Desengaño" [The sky of disappointment]
6. "Arte Infernal" [Infernal art]
7. "En El Baldío" [In the wasteland]
8. "En Pie" [Standing]
9. "El Rey de La Triste Felicidad" [The king of sad happiness]
10. "Estalla" [Explodes]
11. "Hey, Hey, My, My"

== Personnel ==
- Chizzo – lead vocals, lead guitar
- Tete – bass guitar
- Tanque – drums
- Chiflo – saxophone, trumpet
- Manu – saxophone, harmonica, rhythm guitar

=== Guest musicians ===
- Dimitri Rodnoy – cello (track 5)
- Carlos Patan – piano (track 6)
- Ricardo Mollo – guitar, arrangements (track 8)

=== Additional personnel ===
- Gustavo Borner – recording technician, mixing, mastering
- Gabriel Goncalvez – manager
- Alejandro Vasquez – A&R
- Laura Varsky – artwork
