= A Dónde Me Lleva La Vida =

Studio album by La Renga
- Released: April 1994
- Recorded: El Zoológico Studios, 1993
- Genre: Rock
- Length: 41:50
- Label: Self-released (1993); PolyGram (1994)
- Producer: La Renga

La Renga chronology
Esquivando Charcos (1991)	A Dónde Me Lleva La Vida (1994)	Bailando En Una Pata (1995)

A Dónde Me Lleva La Vida is an album by Argentine band La Renga, released in 1994. After the independently produced Esquivando Charcos the band published A Dónde Me Lleva La Vida in the same way in November 1993. Four months later, negotiations led to Polygram gaining production and image rights. The multinational is in charge of the distribution of the album and spent 25,000 dollars on the video for "El Rito de Los Corazones Sangrando". The album achieved platinum status in Argentina for selling over 60,000 copies.

== Track listing ==
All tracks are written by Gustavo Nápoli, except where noted

No.	Title	Length
1.	"El Camino del Deshielo"	4:28
2.	"Cortala y Olvidala"	3:20
3.	"El Rito de Los Corazones Sangrando"	4:01
4.	"Blues Cardíaco"	4:55
5.	"Pis y Caca"	2:13
6.	"El Sátiro de La Mala Leche"	2:14
7.	"El Mambo de La Botella"	4:09
8.	"Debbie El Fantasma"	3:17
9.	"El Circo Romano"	4:01
10.	"2 + 2 = 3"	4:04
11.	"Triste Canción de Amor" (Alex Vera/Gabriél Sanchez)	5:08

== Personnel ==
- Chizzo – lead vocals, lead guitar
- Tete – bass guitar, backing vocals
- Tanque – drums, percussion
- Manu – saxophone
- Chiflo – saxophone

=== Additional personnel ===
- Augusto Milharcic – recording, mixing
- Mario Breuer – mastering
- Pablo Martinian – artwork
- Adrián Mascari – A&R
- Gabriel Goncalvez – manager
