= La Renga =

Argentine rock band

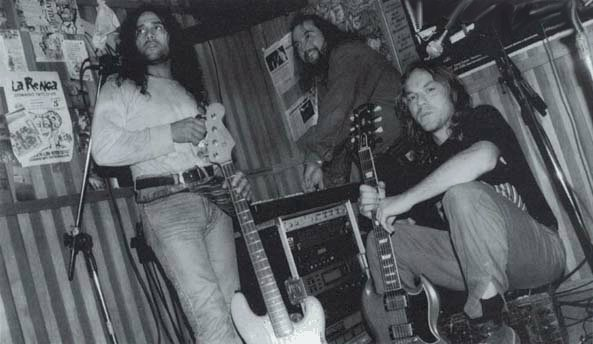
- La Renga in 1992. L-R: Tete, Tanque and Chizzo.

Background information
- Origin: Mataderos, Buenos Aires City, Argentina
- Genres: Hard rock Rock; Argentine rock
- Years active: 1988–present
- Labels: PolyGram; Universal Music; La Renga Discos
- Members: Gustavo Chizzo Nápoli; Gabriel Tete Iglesias; Jorge Tanque Iglesias; Manuel Manu Varela
- Past members: Raúl Locura Dilelio; Gabriel Chiflo Sánchez
- Website: www.larenga.com

La Renga is an Argentine hard rock band, formed in 1988.

They had moderate success with the albums A Dónde Me Lleva La Vida and Bailando en una pata, between 1993 and 1995, but it was the release of Despedazado por Mil Partes, in 1996, that made them nationally famous.

With the releases of La Renga in 1998 and La Esquina del Infinito the following year, they gained some international fame, touring and doing concerts in Uruguay, Chile, Paraguay, Spain, Mexico, the United States and other countries of Latin America. They have sold over one million albums and DVDs in Argentina.

== History ==
=== Early years (1988–1992) ===
In 1988, four young men of Mataderos, Buenos Aires celebrated New Year's Day playing covers of Creedence Clearwater Revival, Vox Dei, The Animals, Manal and other bands. Months later they decided to form a band, and thus La Renga was born. The band was formed by Chizzo (lead vocals and rhythm guitar), Locura (lead guitar), Tete (bass) and Tanque (drums). Their first gigs were at Larrazabal Club, Teatros del Plata, Galpones del Sur and some other clubs.

In 1989 they started recording what would become their 1991 album entitled Esquivando Charcos, a totally independent production that was made up of nine songs, seven of which were recorded in studio and two live in the "rehearsal room."

Because of personal problems, "Locura" Dilelio decided to leave the band. The band began the search for a replacement, but did not find anyone suitable, so Chizzo decided to become the band's lead guitarist.

=== Moderate success (1993–1995) ===
In 1993 A Dónde Me Lleva La Vida was released, which was, again, independently produced, but the requirement to fulfill the public's demand persuaded the band to sign with a major label, PolyGram, with the firm position of not losing artistic independence. Polygram being only in charge of the manufacture and distribution of discs.

In 1994, and after much effort, they managed to completely sell out a concert at Arena Obras Sanitarias, demonstrating a great growth in the following of the band.

In 1995 Bailando En Una Pata was released, which contains live versions of the songs of Esquivando Charcos, accompanied by the song that gives the name to the album, and a version of "Born to Be Wild" by Canadian group Steppenwolf. During 1995 and 1996 La Renga carried out several presentations through Buenos Aires and Greater Buenos Aires.

=== Rise to fame (1996–2000) ===
At the end of 1996, under the artistic production of Divididos' singer Ricardo Mollo, Despedazado por Mil Partes was released and is presented in Buenos Aires with four performance of the complete album in Obras. This new album sold well and attracted great public attention. This album opened doors worldwide and in 1997 their first international tour took place.

On their return in October they participated along with other Argentine bands in a show in tribute to the twenty years of the Mothers of the Plaza de Mayo in front of nearly 20,000 people on the stage of Ferro Carril Oeste. By the end of 1997 La Renga had appeared for the first time in a stadium before 20,000 people affirming the great pull of the band.

In 1998 they appeared on January 1 at the "Tent of Dignity," mounted to protest budget cuts and the lack of importance given to education in Argentina by the government at the time. During 1998 La Renga took it upon themselves to improve the profile of their music in the interior of Argentina, by touring and reaching a new audience. This tour also took them for the first time to Uruguay and later they were invited to appear in Spain. When finalizing this tour the band called a halt to the gigs to begin to producing their fifth recording.

On September 22, 1998 appeared the new album without a title, called by the fans as "the album of the star" in reference to the white star that appears on the cover, which in less than one week became platinum. This disc was promoted in the Argentine capital in two shows on the stage of Atlanta before a total of 48,000 people and with a tour of twenty two Argentine province, finishing at the end of September 1999 in Formosa.

After the tour ended the band performed in the Argentine capital. This time it took the form of two shows in the Estadio Ciudad de Vicente López. La Renga appeared in the Hurricane Stage in two shows where they played songs from their entire repertoire, including the more recent and some songs that would appear on their next album.

In 2000 La Renga visited Montevideo for the second time in the Teatro de Verano. They appeared in Chascomús and soon started preparation for La Esquina del Infinito, their next album, that would be launched in August. The album was promoted with two dates in the Stage of Ferro and with concerts in the interior of Argentina.

=== 2001–present ===
In 2001 La Renga returned to the Estadio Tomás Adolfo Ducó on May 19 and recorded their new live disc, Insoportablemente Vivo that hit stores in September. The show was filmed and was presented in small cinemas throughout the country, a few years later being published in DVD. Without any publicity, and to celebrate the launching of the new album, La Renga returned to the Arena Obras Sanitarias with four shows on the 21, 22, 28 and 29 of September.

In 2002 they reached the peak of their career: a gig in the stage of River Plate before 74,000 people. Alongside this was sold an EP called Documento Único that contained three songs.

In 2003 the band published Detonador de Sueños, album recorded completely in the rehearsal room, like Documento Unico, which would mark a new method of the band in the production of their albums, obtaining a sound similar in power to that of their live concerts. The album was promoted in the Estadio Olímpico Chateau Carreras of Córdoba and on April 17, 2004, in Buenos Aires in the stage of River Plate. The band would close the year with a large show, promoted only by word of mouth, in the already-known stadium of Huracán, this show was called the Eye Of the Hurricane because the stage was located in the center of the pitch. The show was released on the DVD, El Ojo del Huracan.

In 2005 they released the song Viva Pappo, in commemoration of the deceased friend of the band, Norberto "Pappo" Napolitano. It was performed in a double show at the José Amalfitani Stadium, with Pappo's son among the guests.

In 2006, Truenotierra was released. The album was a double CD containing new songs, with the second disc containing jams exclusively. In November 2007 they presented the album in front of more than 100,000 spectators at the Buenos Aires Autodromo.

The 2008 La Renga continue with a concert that was to be March 22 in the city of San Roque in Cordoba, which was postponed when Chizzo suffered an accident with his motorcycle which caused a broken bone in one of his hands which prevented him from playing guitar for two months.

On May 31, at Chateau Carreras Stadium in the city of Cordoba, La Renga gave its first concert since the accident to over 25,000 people. The invitation to this concert was the image onto film which was a wrist with a metal plate and nails.

La Renga for all this after having played a recital at the Autodromo de Bs As had a gig at a campsite called "Actur" San Pedro 13 December.

In 2009 the band celebrated 20 years of history. The event was commemorated on 24 January 2009 a festival at Santa Maria de Punilla, called "The Invisible Footprint (La Huella Invisible)", where La Renga performed with bands and artists like El Tri (Mexico), Koma (Spain), Lovorne, MAD, Los Violadores, Los Gardelitos, Viticus and Edelmiro Molinari.

The band of played at the Estadio Único de La Plata, 30 May 2009, around 45,000 people attended. It had everything from rain that soaked the dedicated fans until submission in an unprecedented way. They also began recording their next album in mid-2009.

In 2010 they released the album "Algún Rayo" which they presented with a tour of the provinces of Argentina and Chile.

The successor of "Algún Rayo" called "Pesados Vestigios" was released in December 2014 and was presented with shows in the main Argentine cities and in Buenos Aires with six shows in the Huracan Stadium in 2017.

During 2019 they did shows in Mexico and released 4 previews of their future album, which are now being finalized in their recording studio.

== Cover versions ==
The band has covered Neil Young and Crazy Horse's song "Hey, Hey, My, My (Into the Black)", which originally featured on the album, Rust Never Sleeps. They released their cover version in 2000 on the album La Esquina del Infinito. Only the title was sung in English; the remainder of the song was translated into Spanish. They also have covered Steppenwolf's "Born to Be Wild" and have performed rare live covers of Creedence Clearwater Revival's "Fortunate Son" and "Someday Never Comes", and Vox Dei's "A Nadie Le Interesa Si Quedás Atrás (Total Qué...)".

== Members ==
=== Current members ===
- Gustavo "Chizzo" Nápoli – lead vocals, lead guitar, rhythm guitar (1988–present)
- Gabriel "Tete" Iglesias – bass guitar (1988–present)
- Jorge "Tanque" Iglesias – drums, percussion (1988–present)
- Manuel "Manu" Varela – saxophone, harmonica, rhythm guitar, lead and backing vocals (1992–present)

=== Former members ===
- Raúl "Locura" Dilelio – lead guitar (1988–1991)
- Gabriel "Chiflo" Sanchez – saxophone, trumpet (1991–2008 )

== Discography ==
=== Studio albums ===
- Esquivando Charcos (1991)
- A Dónde Me Lleva La Vida (1994)
- Despedazado por Mil Partes (1996)
- La Renga (1998)
- La Esquina del Infinito (2000)
- Detonador de Sueños (2003)
- TruenoTierra (2006)
- Algún Rayo (2010)
- Pesados Vestigios (2014)
- Alejado de la red (2022)

=== Live albums ===
- Bailando en una pata (1995)
- Insoportablemente Vivo (2001)
- En el Ojo del Huracán (2006)

=== Videography ===
- Bailando en una pata (1995)
- Insoportablemente Vivo (2004)
- En el Ojo del Huracán (2006)

=== EP ===
- Documento Unico (2002)
- Gira TruenoTierra (2007)
