= Bailando en una pata =

Bailando En Una Pata

Live album by La Renga
- Released: July 1995
- Recorded: Arena Obras Sanitarias, Buenos Aires, Argentina, 1995
- Genre: Hard rock
- Label: PolyGram
- Producers: Mario Breuer; La Renga

La Renga chronology
| A Dónde Me Lleva La Vida (1994) | Bailando En Una Pata (1995) | Despedazado por Mil Partes (1996) |

Bailando En Una Pata is the third album by the Argentine hard rock band La Renga. It contains songs from Esquivando Charcos performed live and recorded at the Arena Obras Sanitarias. It was edited in "El Pie" Studios in July, 1995. The album has a live cover of Steppenwolf's "Born to Be Wild" but the title appears in Spanish and a new song at the time: El Viento Que Todo Empuja. The studio version of this song appears in 1996's album Despedazado por Mil Partes. The album achieved 2× platinum status in Argentina for selling over 120,000 copies.

== Track listing ==
All songs by Gustavo Nápoli, except "Nacido Para Ser Salvaje" (Mars Bonfire), "Quiero Un Sombrero" (Felix Cardenas) and "La Mamadera" (Osmar Safety):

1. "Buseca y Vino Tinto"
2. "Moscas Verdes, Para El Charlatán"
3. "Embrollos, Fatos y Paquetes"
4. "El Viento Que Todo Empuja"
5. "El Juicio del Ganso"
6. "Nacido Para Ser Salvaje"
7. "Intervalo" (crowd)
8. "Negra Mi Alma, Negro Mi Corazón"
9. "Luciendo Mi Saquito Blusero"
10. "Blues de Bolivia" / Medley: "Quiero Un Sombrero" / "La Mamadera"
11. "Somos Los Mismos de Siempre"
12. "Voy a Bailar a La Nave del Olvido"
13. "Bailando En Una Pata"
14. "Cantito Popular" (crowd)

== Personnel ==
- Chizzo - lead vocals, lead guitar
- Tete - bass guitar
- Tanque - drums
- Manu - saxophone
- Chiflo - saxophone

=== Guest musicians ===
- Martín Lorenzo - percussion
- Gastón Bernardou - percussion
- Eduardo Trípodi - percussion

=== Additional personnel ===
- Mario Breuer - mastering
- Jorge Recagno - Video Edit
- Martin Valusso - recording assistant
- Adrián Muscari - A&R
- Pablo Freytes - artwork
- Daniel Del Federico - illustrations
