= Despedazado por Mil Partes =

Studio album by La Renga
- Released: 1996
- Recorded: Ión Studios, Buenos Aires, Argentina, 1996
- Genre: Hard rock
- Length: 53:08
- Label: PolyGram
- Producer: Ricardo Mollo; La Renga

La Renga chronology
Bailando En Una Pata (1995)	Despedazado por Mil Partes (1996)	La Renga (1998)

Despedazado por Mil Partes is a 1996 studio album by Argentine band La Renga.

This record has many of the most famous songs of the band, such as "La Balada del Diablo y La Muerte", "El Final Es En Donde Partí", "Lo Frágil de La Locura", "Veneno" and "Hablando de La Libertad", which closes their concerts.

The front cover of the album shows an angel, which when turned upside down, appears as a demon.

== Track listing ==
All songs by Gustavo Nápoli, except "Veneno" (Marcelo Ferrari):

1. "Desnudo Para Siempre (o Despedazado por Mil Partes)"
2. "A La Carga Mi Rocanrol"
3. "El Final Es En Donde Partí"
4. "La Balada del Diablo y La Muerte"
5. "Cuándo Vendrán"
6. "Psilocybe Mexicana"
7. "Paja Brava"
8. "Lo Frágil de La Locura"
9. "Veneno"
10. "El Viento Que Todo Empuja"
11. "Hablando de La Libertad"

== Personnel ==
- Chizzo - lead vocals, lead guitar
- Tete - bass guitar
- Tanque - drums
- Chiflo - saxophone, trumpet
- Manu - saxophone, harmonica

=== Additional personnel ===
- Tony Peluso - recording technician, mixing, mastering
- Gabriel Goncalvez - manager
- Estudio Del Federico - artwork
- Marcelo Zeballos - illustrations

== Certification ==
Region	Certification	Certified units/sales
Argentina (CAPIF)	4× Platinum	240,000^{^}
^{^} Shipments figures based on certification alone.

== See also ==
- List of best-selling albums in Argentina
