= Andrea Prodan =

Italian composer

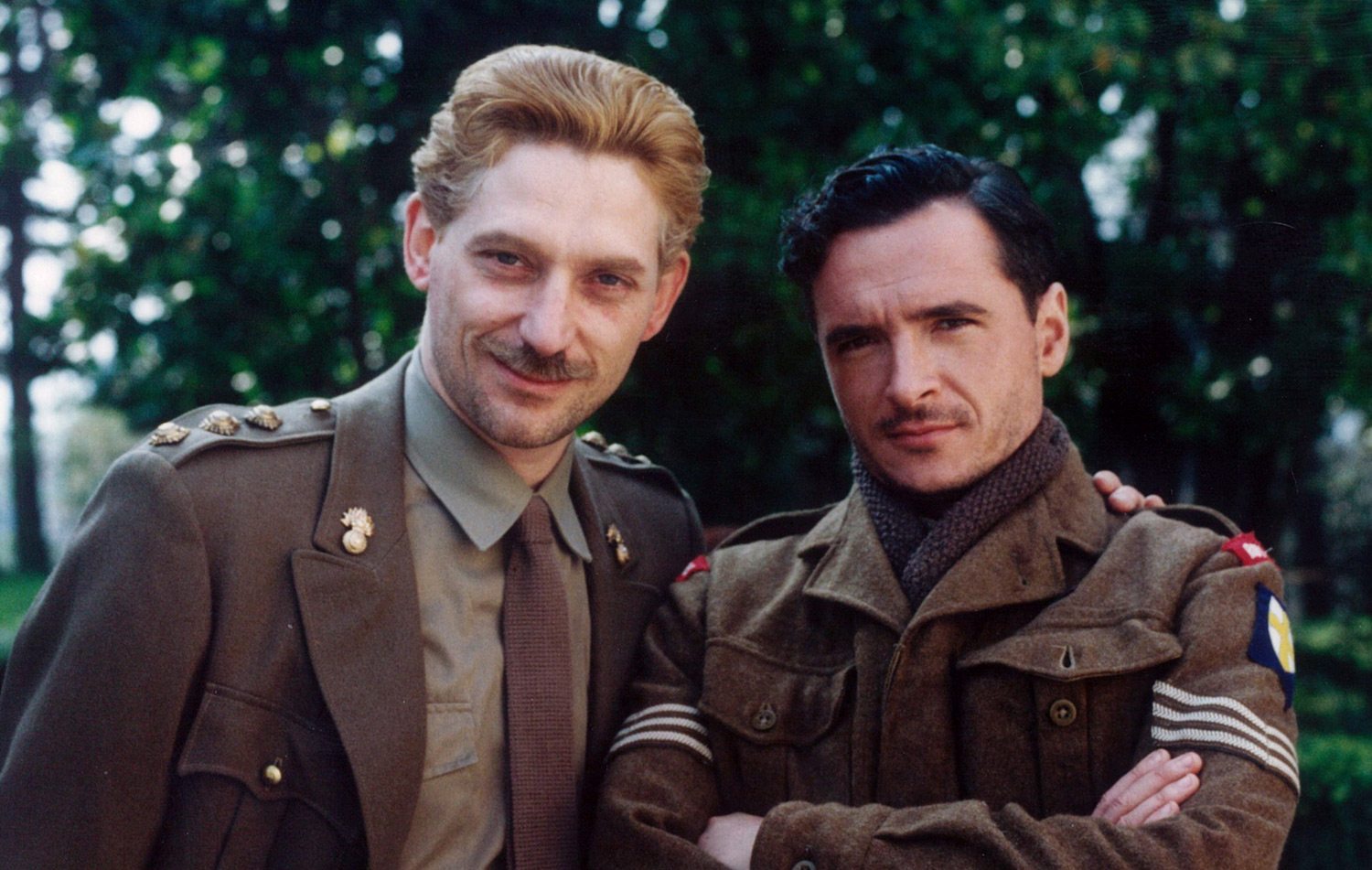
Andrea Prodan (r) on the set of "Unknown Soldier," Italy (1996)

Andrea Prodan (born 16 November 1961) is an Italian film actor, composer and musician. He is the younger brother of rock star Luca Prodan, notable for his musical career in Argentina, leading the rock band Sumo.

== Biography ==
The Prodan family, after suffering internment in a Japanese concentration camp during World War II, was expelled from China due to the civil war. Andrea's Italian father was an author and talented sportsman, and had run a prosperous business, with expertise in ancient Chinese pottery. His mother is Scottish.

The family moved to Rome and Tuscany in 1948, where Andrea spent his early years. He was educated in England, and aged 12, became head chorister at The King's School, Canterbury. As solo voice he recorded "A Song for All Seasons". He started in films as a sound assistant on Krull and also on The Scarlet and the Black, with Gregory Peck.

In 1983, he dropped out of Exeter University to join his elder sister Michela on the set of Italian International Films production in Monastir, Tunisia, producing with NBC a sequel to Franco Zeffirelli's Jesus of Nazareth. A.D., an NBC miniseries, the story of the Acts of the Apostles was directed by Stuart Cooper. Andrea Prodan became (for two years), the assistant operator and interpreter for the Italian director of photography, Ennio Guarnieri. Jesus of Nazareth stars included Ava Gardner, James Mason, Denis Quilley and Fernando Rey. He played alongside Ava Gardner as "Britannicus". During that time he filmed a short film, in the Sahara, which won an ICA prize in 1984. He went on to work with Federico Fellini on a series of rare commercials directed by the film giant, and lit by Guarnieri.

Fluent in English, Italian, and Spanish, Andrea Prodan pursued a career mainly in Italian films. In 1985, he appeared in Summer Games and as a co-protagonist in the film The Berlin Affair (Interno Berlinese) by Liliana Cavani. Following this he appeared in films with the Taviani brothers (Good Morning, Babylon) and Peter Greenaway (The Belly of an Architect). In 1987, he played the role of Ettore Majorana in the historical movie I ragazzi di via Panisperna by Gianni Amelio. There followed work with various directors such as Guido Chiesa, and Alex and Fiorella Infascelli. In 1999 he played Karl in Ricky Tognazzi's Canone inverso.

In 1991, he played the mentally disabled but handsome "Marco", who breaks up a romance between characters played by Bruno Ganz and teaming up, once again, with Ornella Muti in the third segment of the anthology film Especially on Sunday. Muti and Prodan had become friends on the set of A Season of Giants, a 1990 U.S. mini-series in which he portrayed renaissance painter Raphael, and Muti his muse Onoria.

In 1995, he travelled to Argentina and with the Argentinian post-punk experimental group Las Pelotas supported The Rolling Stones in his first visit to this country in River Plate Stadium, and with Felix Valls at the console, recorded "Viva Voce", a record in which he impersonates all the instruments, using nothing but his voice. The disc received warm reviews and the musician Peter Gabriel called it his favourite record of the year. In 2001, Andrea decided to settle in Argentina. In 2005, he worked with Emmanuele Crialese in the film Nuovomondo, winner of the Leone d'Argento at the Venice Film Festival (2006). He composed the film score for two Argentinian films (El jardín primitivo and Caballos en la ciudad) and for innumerable advertising spots. A series of TV commercials in which he depicts the fictitious, toothy comic character 'Al Dentice', was aired nationwide in Italy. He lives in Buenos Aires and in Córdoba, Argentina and has three children. He heads the rock band Romapagana and hosts the radio shows Metiendo Púa, and Parcialmente Nublado. He is also a point of reference regarding his brother, Luca, who died in 1987. On 31 December 2009 Romapagana released its first album, which was recorded by Mariano Iezzi in CCCI Studios, Buenos Aires, Argentina. The band's second album, "Vívido", was released in November 2016. He directed the play 'Imarca' the same year. In 2019 he edited the record 'Freshness of Surprise' under the alter-ego of Dre Dre Bondang. This year also saw the launch of a musical group dedicated to the enthusiastic evocation of David Bowie's tremendously varied musical legacy, it is called 'Bowie ReMembered' and operates from Buenos Aires. During global 'Lockdown' in the early 2020s Prodan released his second album as Dre Dre Bondang, 'TWO', as well as recording a spate of new songs with Celina Varela and with 'Bowie ReMembered'.
