= Luca Prodan =

Italian-born Argentine musician

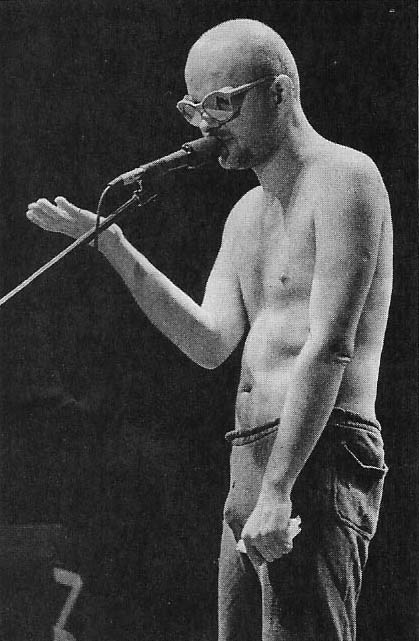
- Prodan in 1987 shortly before his death
- Born: Luca George Prodan; 17 May 1953; Rome, Italy
- Died: 22 December 1987 (aged 34); Buenos Aires, Argentina
- Resting place: Avellaneda Cemetery; 34°42′0″S 58°20′48.839″W
- Education: The Gordonstoun School
- Occupation: Musician • singer • songwriter
- Years active: c.1970–1987
- Notable work: Sumo
- Relatives: Andrea Prodan (brother)

Luca George Prodan (17 May 1953 – 22 December 1987) was an Italian–Scottish musician and singer, best known as lead vocalist of the influential Argentine alternative rock band Sumo. He is widely considered one of the country's most important artists.

Born in Rome to an affluent family in the art industry, Prodan was sent at nine years old to the United Kingdom for school at Gordonstoun. During his studies, Prodan learned to play the guitar and became heavily influenced by the recent progressive and psychedelic rock music that have emerged during the decade. At seventeen years old and one year away from graduating, Prodan abandoned his studies and returned to Italy. Prodan eventually returned to the United Kingdom for work, settling across Brighton, Manchester, and London; he soon became addicted to heroin.

Prodan moved to the outskirts of Buenos Aires in 1980 to recover from his heroin addiction, where he met Germán Daffunchio (brother-in-law of Prodan's friend from Gordonstoun, Timmy McKern) and Alejandro Sokol. Together they formed Sumo. For much of the decade until Prodan's death, the band would become one of the most influential groups in shaping Argentine rock of its time. Prodan, along with the rest of Sumo, are credited for introducing British post-punk to not just Argentina, but to the continent, by providing songs in the English language, and for providing a visceral counterpoint to the progressive-influenced themes that dominated Spanish-language rock at that time.

Prodan was the older brother of Italian film actor and composer, Andrea Prodan.

== Early life ==
Luca George Prodan was born in Rome on 17 May 1953, the son of Mario Prodan, an Italian citizen born in the Austro-Hungarian Empire, and Cecilia Pollock, born in China to Scottish parents who worked between Shanghai and Beijing before World War II. His father had set up a prosperous business in ancient Chinese ceramics that became untenable after the Japanese invasion of China during the war.

Prodan was the third child of four: Michela (Michaela) and Claudia were the oldest, and Andrea was the youngest. Michela and Andrea worked in the world of cinema, although Andrea has a musical background as a soloist with England's most famous choir in his early youth and as a creative musician in his later years.

In 1962, when Prodan was nine years old, his parents sent him to Britain to the prestigious Gordonstoun School, the same school attended by King Charles III. An urban legend in Argentina is that Prodan once hit Charles III, although the monarch is five years older. During his academic studies, Prodan befriended Timmy McKern, a Scottish Argentine, who would be his friend until his death. In 1970, at seventeen years old and just one year shy of completing his studies, Prodan dropped out and fled from Gordonstoun. As his family requested his search through the Interpol, Prodan was travelling across Europe alone back to Rome. Prodan sold a shotgun beforehand to fund his trip. He was eventually found by his mother in Rome while being arrested by the police.

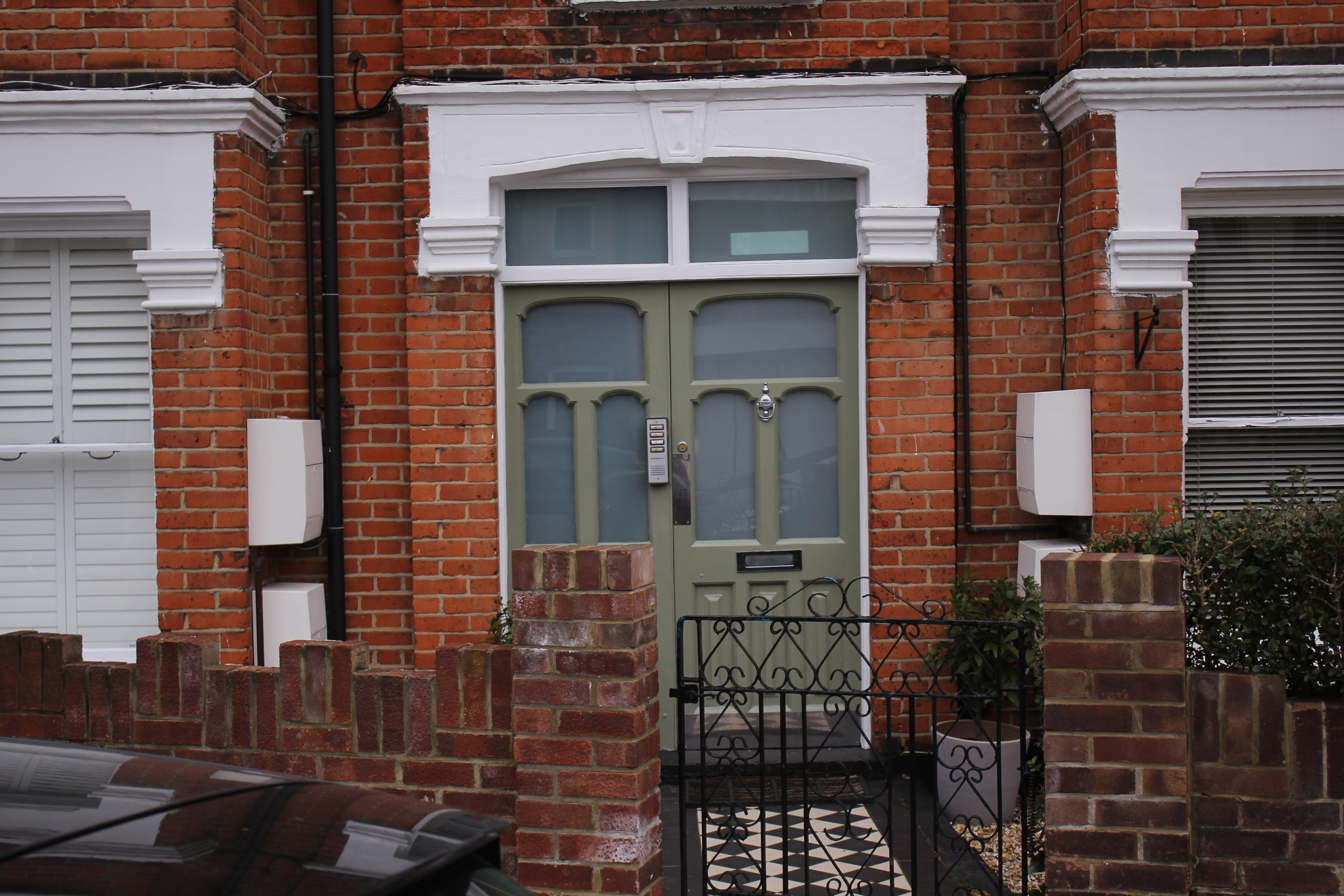
Prodan's last home in the United Kingdom before settling in Argentina; Prodan last lived at 30B Thames Road in Chiswick, London

Later in his life, Prodan got a job at a newly established Virgin Records store in Marble Arch, London. During his tenure with the store, Prodan began to accumulate some of the most famous records – most of which were stolen from a warehouse – in which one in every 10 records he sold would end up in his house. He was quickly fired, but was soon rehired at the expense of clients who claimed Prodan was "the Italian who could discover the title of a song and its interpreter just by listening to an out of tune whistle." Nonetheless, Prodan's second chance at Virgin Records was short-lived; Prodan continued to steal records, and his theft record reached levels of excess. In addition to taking records for his personal gain, he also stole records for his friends and his brother Andrea.

During his time in London, he formed his first band, The New Clear Heads, which shared aesthetics with contemporary punk bands like XTC, The Fall, Joy Division (who later inspired the title of the first Sumo album: Divididos por la Felicidad) and Wire. Prodan's musical sensibilities, influenced by the heyday of British ex-colonial rhythms such as dub and reggae, the latter of which influenced British popular music of that time, were impacted by the personal style of post-punk singer-songwriters such as Joe Jackson, Graham Parker or Elvis Costello, although the irony of Ian Dury & the Blockheads also refers to the jocular and festive style of some of the songs that Prodan would develop as a leader of the Argentine group Sumo.

Prodan began to use heroin during this time. In 1979, his sister Claudia committed suicide alongside her boyfriend after locking herself in a car and inhaling carbon monoxide. After knowing this, Prodan fell into a coma from a heroin overdose, for which he was almost presumed dead.

== Career ==
=== 1980: Arrival to Argentina ===
"It all started with a photo that crossed the ocean from these lands to Rome. Luca Prodan was walking on the verge of death and the family postcard he received showed Timmy McKern's Cordoban refuge where everything was life and nature. One dog, two girls, and a smiling couple with the mountains of Nono as the backdrop for an idyllic life. With Timmy, they had shared the school in the north of Scotland that Prince Charles of Wales also attended. Their invitation was the last card that Luca had to play and win a few more years of life. I didn't even imagine that, years later, with his music he would mark a break in the history of our rock."

— Pedro Irigoyen, Memorias del Happy Valley Rock

Searching for a way out of his addiction – which had already ended his sister's life, and almost his own – Prodan settled in Argentina in March 1980. He travelled without knowing practically anything about the country, only dreaming of a bucolic photo that McKern had sent him of his family upon the mountains of Córdoba, and viewed it as a paradise. McKern informed Prodan that there wasn't any heroin in Argentina and was not known in the country then.

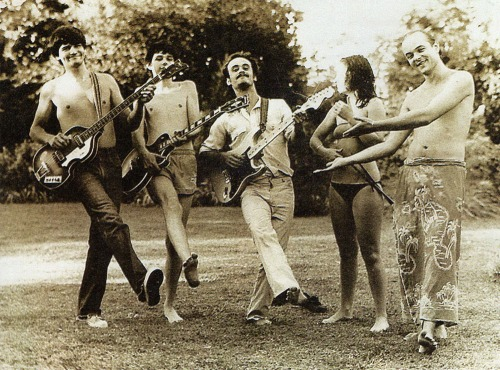
Prodan (far right) with the first lineup of Sumo in 1981

The same day Prodan arrived in Argentina, McKern went to meet him at the Ministro Pistarini International Airport of Ezeiza and let him stay at his house in Hurlingham, Buenos Aires. Among the relatives that McKern introduced to Prodan was his brother-in-law, Germán Daffunchio, who at that time was a 20-year-old sailor. After dinner that day, Daffunchio began to play his guitar. Prodan joined him and began to sing; the two then began to think about forming a band. They immediately moved to McKern's family field in Valle de Traslasierra. Daffunchio eventually introduced his friend, Alejandro Sokol, and thus gave birth to Sumo, with Prodan at vocals, Daffunchio as the guitarist, and Sokol on bass.

During this project, Prodan had to find ways to calm the nerves and anxiety that had remained as a result of his heroin addiction. The area was, already at that time, a hotspot of artists and hippies who went to live in rural areas such as Valle de Traslasierra to escape the repression prevailing in the big cities during the military dictatorship that ruled Argentina between 1976 and 1983. In this area, Prodan found relief in marijuana, of which there were numerous artisan producers, as well as in alcohol.

Prodan became fond of gin, of which he would drink a bottle a day. When he returned to Buenos Aires to start Sumo, Prodan took his drinking habits with him and thus joined the nascent Buenos Aires underground, a cultural movement that began to develop between the end of the military dictatorship and the return of democracy in which drugs occupied a central place, especially cocaine. However, Prodan – unlike other members of Sumo – would never become addicted to this substance.

=== 1981–1983: Sumo's beginnings and release of first album ===
After observing the promising evolution of those jams, McKern, who would become the future manager of the band, would introduce Prodan to Ricardo Curtet, a guitarist and friend of McKern, to whom he would propose the idea of forming a band. At that time, Curtet was a resident of Mina Clavero. Once presented, Prodan returned to London to start buying instruments and convinced his friend Stephanie Nuttal to be the drummer for his new band. Nuttal had been part of Manicured Noise, a Mancunian-based rock influenced by bands like the Siouxsie and the Banshees and XTC.

The first lineup of Sumo consisted of Daffunchio on lead guitar, Curtet on rhythm guitar, Sokol on bass, Nuttal on drums, and Prodan on vocals. The presence of the Nuttal in the lineup was quite noticeably rare as most rock bands of that time were made up exclusively of men. In 1981, they would later make up a posthumous album entitled Time, Fate, Love.

After this recording, the idea of moving the band to Hurlingham, where most of the members came from, began to flourish. However, this caused the first disagreements in the group when Curtet disassociated himself, who – having been a father during that time – decided to return to Mina Clavero to take care of his family. Once the band was established in Hurlingham, the band's first concert was set at a nightclub called Caroline's Pub, with a show based on songs sung in English. From there they went on to give several shows in another local venue called Mastropiero. The Falklands War, which initiated in April 1982, caught the band by surprise, as anything related to the United Kingdom, including the English language, was deemed frowned upon and even prohibited in Argentina; per the request of her parents, Nuttal's made an immediate return to England. As a result of her departure, Sokol became the drummer and the position of bassist was taken over by Diego Arnedo, who played in a band from Hurlingham called MAM with brothers Omar and Ricardo Mollo. the latter of which would join Sumo later on. Roberto Pettinato, at that time a music journalist, along with being a director of a local rock magazine and radio host for rock segments, joined the band in mid-1983. Pettinato brought to the band a unique style of music that would define Sumo in later songs, mixing rock and his saxophone skills. Impressed after seeing a live Sumo performance, Pettinato invited Luca to his radio show; they instantly became friends and Prodan decided to let Pettinato join the band.

=== 1984–1985: Divididos por la felicidad and the band's rise to stardom ===
In 1984, Sokol left the band and, due to the lack of drummers, there were a couple of shows with Prodan playing electronic drums. Soon after, Prodan heard about a rehearsal at the mythical Café Einstein, a local underground Rock venue in the heart of Buenos Aires, by the band Oiga Diga and recruited their drummer, Alberto Troglio to replace Sokol. Later on, invited by Diego Arnedo, Ricardo Mollo joined as guitarist. That formation, with Prodan, Daffunchio, Arnedo, Mollo, Troglio, and Pettinato, would remain until Prodan's death and the subsequent dissolution of the group.

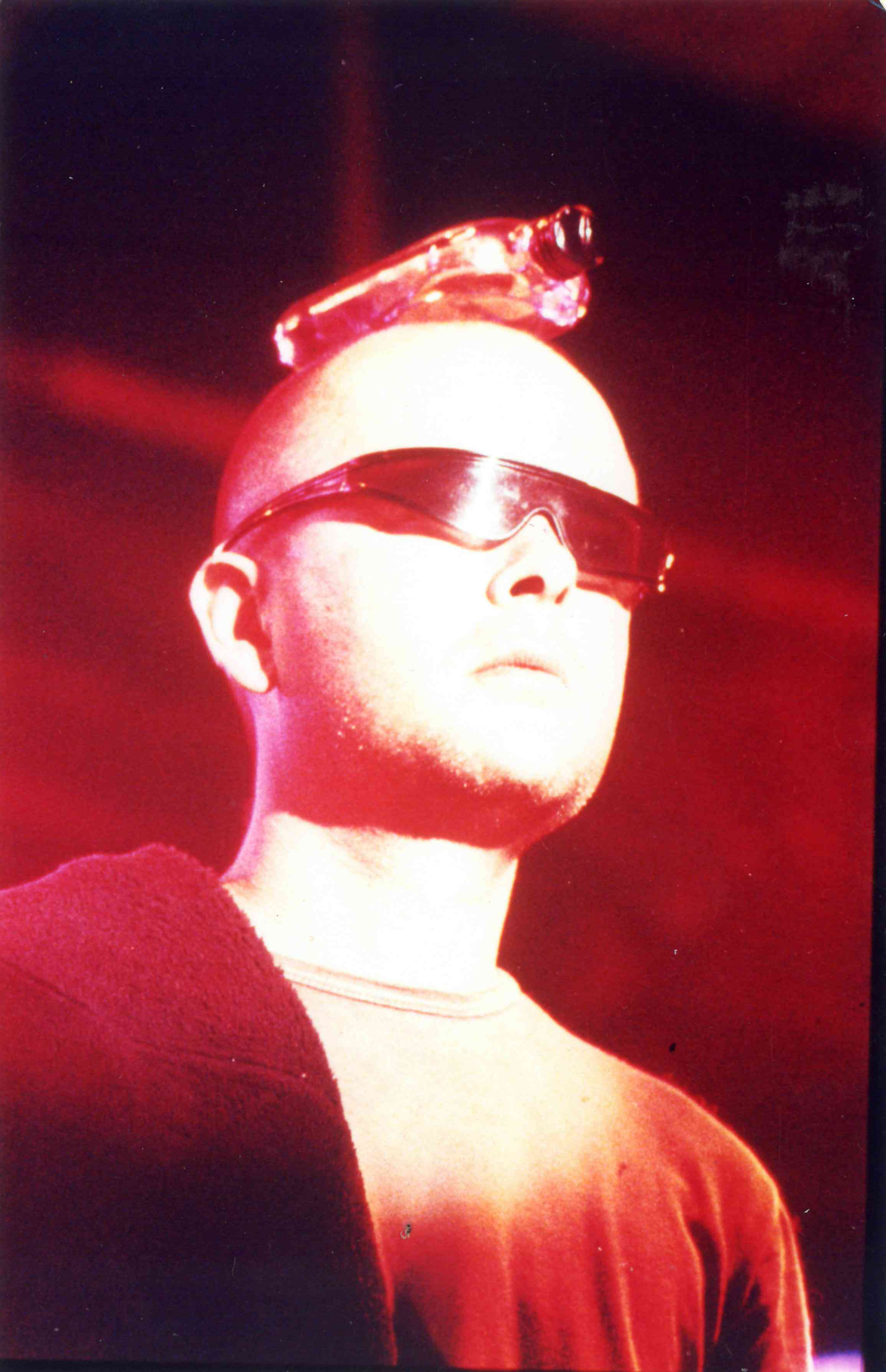
Prodan performing at a concert with an empty bottle of gin on his head

During these years, Luca Prodan, who did not have a home in Buenos Aires and had made a great friendship with the owners of Café Einstein, came to sleep on the premises or in their house and playing practically every day. On weekends, Prodan would work with Sumo and weekdays with his parallel projects The Hurlingham Reggae Band, Ojos de Terciopelo, and Sumito (an acoustic group). All these groups, with small variations in the formation, played several recitals every weekend in venues not only in Café Einstein, but also in other underground strongholds such as Zero, Stud Free Pub, La Esquina del Sol, and Parakultural. In 1983, Sumo released their first album, Corpiños en la Madrugada, in the form of a cassette and with limited distribution. Two years later, Sumo released their first "official" album, Divididos por la Felicidad — titled with the translation of English band Joy Division — in which the songs captured a lot of reggae influences from Bob Marley and also from funk and post-punk, with their single es:La rubia tarada being the most successful song on the LP.

=== 1986–1987: Final works ===
In 1986, Sumo released Llegando los Monos, which contains various music genres such as reggae, aggressive rock, and post-punk. Some of their songs have become hymns, such as Exploding from the Ocean, El Ojo Blindado, or TV Caliente. The hit of the album was Los Viejos Vinagres, arguably the band's most famous song. After a series of successful concerts that year, the group consecrating themselves as one of the most attractive bands of that moment. For instance, on 23 May 1987, Prodan went to see fellow Argentine band Patricio Rey y sus Redonditos de Ricota at the Cemento nightclub. Before the concert, Prodan went to greet them in the dressing room. The band the offered him to participate in the concert, to which he agreed. Prodan went on stage during one of the band's well-known songs, Criminal Mambo, in which he sang some improvised lyrics in dark and guttural English, whereas the lead singer, Indio Solari, sang in Italian. In 1987, they released their third and last album, After Chabón, which shows a remarkable maturity in their musical and lyrical matters.

== Health issues and death ==
In the same year of the release of After Chabón, Prodan had already fallen into alcoholism, which caused him serious health problems, including incipient liver cirrhosis. A few days before he died, Prodan spoke with his brother Andrea via telephone, asking Andrea to visit him in Argentina. "I'm feeling bad. You have to come." Prodan said in his conversation with his brother.

Prodan would continue, until the end, doing live performances, which at that time were the band's main source of financial income; the band would play in concerts frequently. The last Sumo recital was held at the Eduardo Gallardón Stadium on 20 December 1987, before an audience of about 500 people. The show was opened up with Los Violadores; the lead singer, Pil Trafa, remembered that he saw Prodan as "very thin, very emaciated. He was yellow." His former colleagues later recalled that he arrived drunk to the concert with a bottle of gin in his hand. Security personnel did not recognize him and tried to prevent him from entering. After the show's intercession, Prodan entered the stadium but made a scene in the dressing room, breaking bottles and shouting. He would eventually perform; after singing Fuck you, he said to the crowd, "There it goes. The last one."

Evidently, he meant that it was the last song of the show, but subsequent events gave this phrase a prophetic character. Two days later, on Tuesday, 22 December 1987, Prodan was found dead in the room he rented in the boarding house located at 451 Alsina Street in San Telmo, Buenos Aires. The room was managed by pianist and tuner, Marcelo Arbiser, a friend of Prodan. He was found dead by his then-girlfriend, Silvia Ceriani.

As the years went by, different versions of his cause of death have emerged. The press reported that he had suffered a cardiac arrest attributed to severe internal bleeding caused by his cirrhosis. Years later, Argentine writer Enrique Symns spread an alternative version. In an interview, Symns said that he died from a heroin overdose. He also said Prodan had gone years without using heroin simply because it was impossible to get it in Argentina at that time, but in 1987, the first doses would have arrived on the streets of Buenos Aires, and Prodan would have tried to inject a dose again, similar to what happened in London, although his body no longer had the same tolerance, which would have caused his death. Ceriani, who rented another room in the same pensión where Prodan died, denies it was a drug overdose. Pettinato believes Prodan's death was from an overdose, but rather from methamphetamine.

No autopsy was ever performed. McKern and Troglio later acknowledged that Prodan's colleagues and friends were afraid of an autopsy to search the causes of his death. Lawyer Albino Stefanolo, who has worked with other famous Argentine artists, was left in charge of handling the situation with the authorities, ultimately establishing Prodan's death as natural causes.

Two posthumous records of pre-Sumo recordings were later released as an "insider's" view of the artist. Recorded mostly in the Traslasierra region, the recordings bear testimony to his musical influences and inspiration such as Peter Hammill, David Bowie, Jim Morrison, Nick Drake, Lou Reed, Ian Dury, Ian Curtis of Joy Division and Bob Marley. After his death, two bands were formed by former Sumo members: Divididos and Las Pelotas. It is believed that the actual names came after a heated Prodan's answer referring to an eventual Sumo break-up: "Are we breaking up, you say? Bollocks we are!"; hence Divididos (Spanish for "The Divided") and Las Pelotas (Spanish for "Bollocks").

== Tributes and recognitions ==
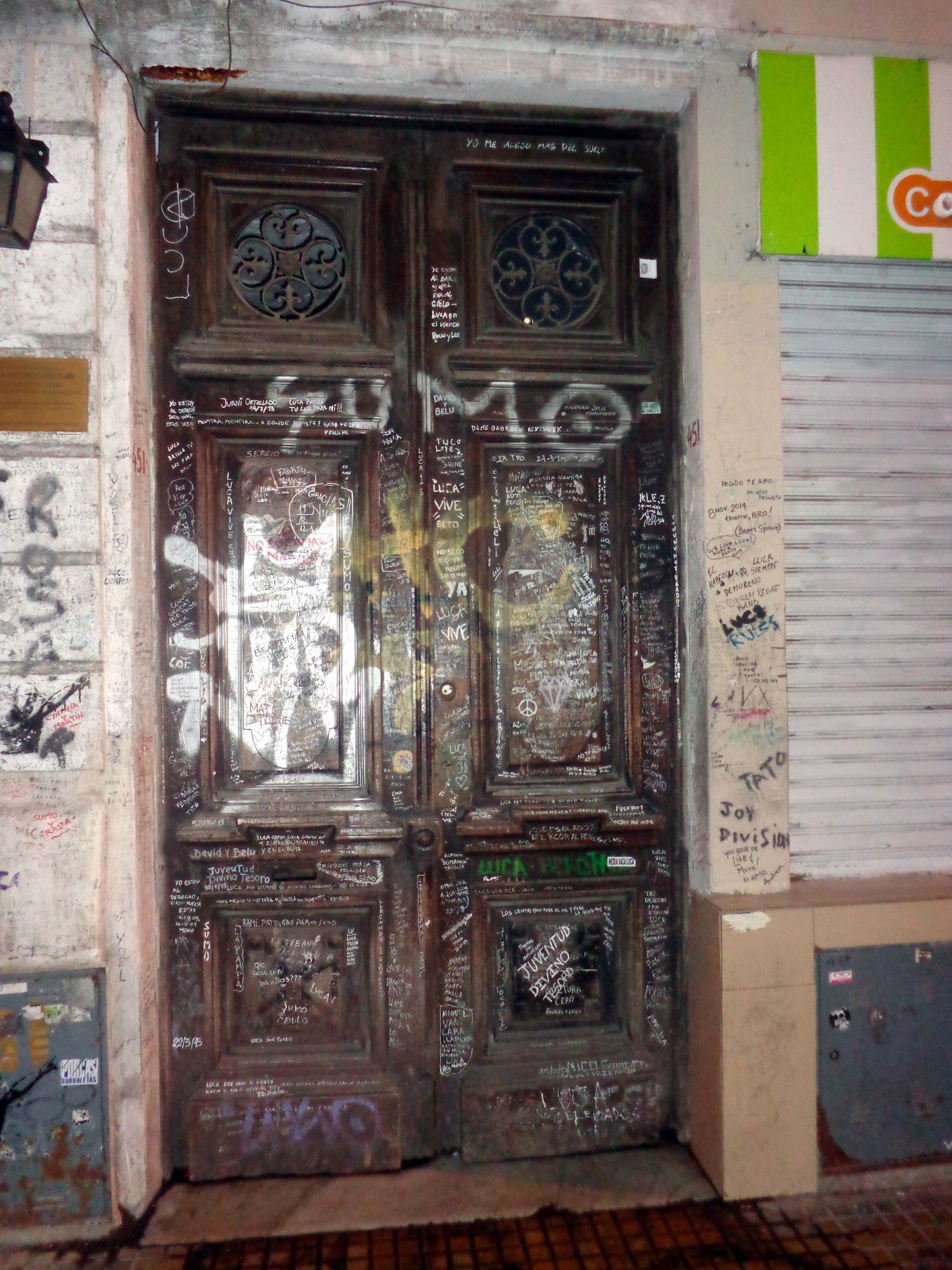
Prodan's last house in Argentina before his death in the neighbourhood of San Telmo, Buenos Aires. Graffiti, showing fan's appreciation, is sprayed all around the front door

- The Argentine group Divididos, made up of his former colleagues Ricardo Mollo and Diego Arnedo, dedicated the song "Luca" to him on their album Gol de Mujer (1998).
- The singer Vicentico dedicated the single "Luca" to him from his album Sólo un Momento (2010).
- The Chilean funk group Los Tetas dedicated the song "Sale Luca" to her on their debut album Mama Funk (1995).
- The Argentine group Bersuit Vergarabat mentions him in their song "En trance" from their album Don Leopardo (1996) and, without mentioning him, pays tribute to Prodan with the song "Murguita del sur" from their album Libertinaje (1998).
- Andrés Ciro Martínez dedicated the song "Malambo para Luca" to him on his first solo CD with fellow-Argentine band, Ciro y los Persas (2010).
- Prodan is mentioned in the song "Todo eso" by Callejeros on the album Rocanroles sin Destino (2004).
- The Argentine heavy metal band Tren Loco dedicated the song "Luca no Murió" to him on the 2005 reissue of their second studio album, ¡No me importa!
- In 1999, Luca, a documentary directed by Rodrigo Espina, was released.
- In 2002 the film Luca Vive was released, directed by Jorge Coscia with a script by Carlos Polimeni, Daniel Ritto and Jorge Coscia.
- In 2008, the Danish documentary Together by Jannik Splidsboel, a portrait of Andrea and Luca Prodan, premiered in competition at the Berlin International Film Festival.
- A group of Argentinians, with the Argentinian consulate, are working toward placing a blue plaque in the house where Prodan lived in Chiswick.

== Discography ==
=== Sumo ===
- Corpiños en la Madrugada (EP, 1983)
- Divididos por la Felicidad (1985)
- Llegando los Monos (1986)
- After Chabón (1987)
- Fiebre (1989)

=== Individual works ===
- Time Fate Love, recorded in 1980, released in 1996
- Perdedores Hermosos, recorded in 1981, released in 1997
