= Pajaritos, bravos muchachitos =

2013 album by Indio Solari

Studio album by Los Fundamentalistas del Aire Acondicionado
- Released: 11 December 2013
- Recorded: Luzbola studios 2011–2013
- Genre: Rock, post-grunge, alternative rock
- Label: DBN
- Producer: Indio Solari

Los Fundamentalistas del Aire Acondicionado chronology
El perfume de la tempestad (2010)	Pajaritos, bravos muchachitos (2013)

Pajaritos, Bravos Muchachitos is the fourth album of the Argentinean musician Indio Solari among with his band "Los Fundamentalistas del Aire Acondicionado". The album includes the participation of "Semilla" Bucciarelli, Sergio Dawi and Walter Sidotti, old bandmates of Solari in Patricio Rey y sus Redonditos de Ricota, in the last song "La pajarita pechiblanca". Even though Solari had intended to work with them before, they had not shared a studio since the band separated in 2001.

== Overview ==
As usual in his post Patricio Rey albums, Solari appears on the credits under a pseudonym, this time it's El Fisgón Ciego.

Among with Solari are as well Gaspar Benegas and Baltasar Comotto playing guitar, Marcelo Torres bass guitar, Hernán Aramberri y Martín Carrizo in the drums, Sergio Colombo playing the saxophone, Miguel Ángel Tallarita in trumpets, Pablo Sbaraglia in keyboards and Alejandro Elijovich in violin. The album was produced and recorded at Luzbola, Solari's personal studio. Engineering and edition was done by Martín Carrizo and Hernán Aramberri.

== Songlist ==
- All songs were written by Solari, except "La Pajarita Pechiblanca" written by Dawi, Bucciarelli, Sidotti and Solari.

No.	Title	Length
1.	"A los Pájaros Que Cantan Sobre las Selvas de Internet [To the Birds Who Sing Over the Internet Jungles]"	3:56
2.	"Beemedobleve [Beeemdouble-u]"	3:16
3.	"A la Luz de la Luna [In Moonlight]"	4:38
4.	"Las Supersticiones Traen Mala Suerte [Superstitions Bring Bad Luck]"	4:16
5.	"Amok! Amok!"	5:10
6.	"Chau Mohicano [Goodbye Mohican]"	4:16
7.	"Arca Monster [Ark Monster]"	3:34
8.	"Cada Pequeña Muerte [Every Little Death]"	3:16
9.	"Babas del Diablo [Drools of the Devil]"	4:05
10.	"Había una Vez... [Once Upon A Time...]"	4:28
11.	"Un Par de Fantasmas [A Pair Of Ghosts]"	4:25
12.	"La Pajarita Pechiblanca (scherzo) [The White-chested Bird (scherzo)]"	3:27

== Credits ==
Musicians

- Indio Solari – Lead vocals.
- Gaspar Benegas – Rhythm guitar.
- Baltasar Comotto – Lead guitar.
- Marcelo Torres – Bass guitar.
- Hernán Aramberri and Martín Carrizo – Drums.
- Pablo Sbaraglia – Keyboards and samplers.
- Miguel Ángel Tallarita – Brass.

Guests

- Alejandro Elijovich – Violin.
- Daniel "Semilla" Bucciarelli - Bass guitar on "La pajarita pechiblanca".
- Walter Sidotti - Drums on "La pajarita pechiblanca".
- Sergio Dawi - Accordion on "La pajarita pechiblanca".
