= Etiqueta Negra =

Etiqueta Negra (Spanish for "Black Label") may refer to:

- Etiqueta Negra (magazine)
- BEHER (ham) products line Etiqueta Negra (Black Label): acorn-fed ham
- Etiqueta Negra, album by Milly Quezada y los Vecinos
- Etiqueta Negra, compilation album Nosequien y Los Nosecuantos
- "Etiqueta negra", song by Patricio Rey y sus Redonditos de Ricota from Cordero Atado
