= Cordero Atado =

Cordero atado

Studio album by Patricio Rey y sus Redonditos de Ricota
- Released: 1993
- Recorded: Del Cielito Studios, Parque Leloir; March and July, 1993
- Genre: Hard rock Blues rock
- Length: 40:46
- Label: Del Cielito
- Producer: Patricio Rey

Patricio Rey y sus Redonditos de Ricota chronology
Lobo suelto (1993)	Cordero atado (1993)	Luzbelito (1996)

Cordero Atado is the seventh album by Argentine rock band Patricio Rey y sus Redonditos de Ricota, released in 1993.

== Background ==
After the incidents at the Estadio Obras, the band played two gigs in 1992, the first was in Lanús in May, the second at the Teatro San Martín of Mar del Plata in August, the group started to record their next album in early 1993, with Hernán Aramberri as collaborator.

The mixing was made in Miami and was completed in Los Ángeles, United States.

The official presentation of the two albums was at the Estadio Huracán in 1994 on two dates, in front of 80,000 fans.

== Track listing ==
- All songs written by Solari/Beilinson.

No.	Title	Length
1.	"Yo caníbal [I Cannibal]"	2:58
2.	"Ladrón de mi cerebro [Thief Of My Brain]"	3:35
3.	"¡Es hora de levantarse, querido! (¿dormiste bien?) [Is Time To Wake Up, Dear (Did You Sleep Well?)]"	3:37
4.	"Perdiendo el tiempo [Losing My Time]"	3:53
5.	"Caña seca y un membrillo [Dry cane and a quince]"	4:29
6.	"Soga de Caín [Cain Rope]" (Instrumental)	1:21
7.	"Lavi-rap"	4:13
8.	"El arte del buen comer [The art of good eating]"	4:37
9.	"¡Lobo, ¿estás?! [Wolf, are you there?]"	3:02
10.	"Botija rapado [Uruguaian dude close-cropped]"	2:50
11.	"San Telmo [Saint Telmo]" (Instrumental)	0:43
12.	"Etiqueta negra [Black label]"	5:40

== Personnel ==
Patricio Rey

- Indio Solari - Lead Vocals.
- Skay Beilinson - Guitars.
- Semilla Bucciarelli - Bass guitar.
- Walter Sidotti - Drums.
- Sergio Dawi - Saxophone.

Guests

- Guillermo "Dedos Brujos" Piccolini - Keyboards on "Caña seca y un membrillo".
- Barry Brodsky - Backing vocals on "Lavi-rap".
- Hernán Aramberri - Effects and samplers.

=== Additional personnel ===
- Mario Breuer: Engineer.
- Barry Brodsky: Engineer.
- Poly and Heidi: Executive producer.
- Rocambole, Semilla Bucciarelli and Meroyuela: Art and design.
