= Luzbelito =

Studio album by Patricio Rey y sus Redonditos de Ricota
- Released: 1996
- Recorded: 1994–1995 "Be Bop" Studios "New River" Studios; El Pie Studios
- Genre: Hard rock Blues rock
- Length: 56:21
- Label: Del Cielito
- Producer: Patricio Rey

Patricio Rey y sus Redonditos de Ricota chronology
Cordero Atado (1993)	Luzbelito (1996)	Último Bondi a Finisterre (1998)

Luzbelito is the eighth album by Argentine rock band Patricio Rey y sus Redonditos de Ricota, released in 1996. In 2007, the Argentine edition of Rolling Stone ranked it 88th on its list of "The 100 Greatest Albums of National Rock".

== Background ==
Luzbelito is a concept album, based on a fictional child of the Devil called "Luzbelito", plays with the ambiguities of human beliefs and behaviors from different points of view.

The recording began in Brazil on "Be Bop" Studios, São Paulo and then in Fort Lauderdale, Florida on "New River" Studios. Back in Buenos Aires, the mixing was completed in El Pie. Two songs on this album were re-recorded: "Blues de la libertad" and "Mariposa Pontiac", which were part of the Patricio Rey first demo, in 1982.

The tour began in Santa Fe, in August 1996 and continued through Tandil and Mar del Plata.

== Track listing ==
- All songs written by Solari/Beilinson.

No.	Title	Length
1.	"Luzbelito y las sirenas [Luzbelito And The Sirens]"	4:06
2.	"Cruz Diablo! [Cross Devil]"	4:13
3.	"Ella baila con todos [She Dances With Everybody]"	4:59
4.	"Fanfarria del Cabrío [Fanfare Of The Goat]"	5:08
5.	"Nuotatori Professionisti [Professional Swimmers]"	4:41
6.	"Blues de la libertad [Freedom Blues]"	5:00
7.	"La dicha no es cosa alegre [Happiness Is Not A Joyful Thing]"	5:37
8.	"Me matan limón! [They Kill Me, Limon!]"	3:35
9.	"Rock yugular [Jugular Rock]"	7:04
10.	"Mariposa Pontiac - Rock del país [Pontiac Butterfly - Country Rock]"	4:49
11.	"Juguetes perdidos [Lost Toys]"	7:09

== Personnel ==
Patricio Rey

- Indio Solari - Lead Vocals.
- Skay Beilinson - Guitars.
- Semilla Bucciarelli - Bass guitar.
- Walter Sidotti - Drums.
- Sergio Dawi - Saxophone.

Guest

- Lito Vitale - Keyboards.
- Rodolfo Yaria - Trumpet on "Fanfarria del cabrío".
- Metaleira Mantequeira - Brass.

=== Additional personnel ===
- Poly - Management.
- Rocambole - Art cover and design.
- Silvio Reyes Quintana - Graphic Design.
- Juan Manuel Moreno - Graphic Design.
