= Último Bondi a Finisterre =

Studio album by Patricio Rey y sus Redonditos de Ricota
- Released: 1998
- Recorded: Luzbola Studios, 1998
- Genre: Experimental rock Post-grunge; Alternative rock
- Length: 44:19
- Label: Del Cielito Records
- Producer: Patricio Rey

Patricio Rey y sus Redonditos de Ricota chronology
Luzbelito (1996)	Último Bondi a Finisterre (1998)	Momo Sampler (2000)

Último Bondi a Finisterre (Last Bus to Finisterre) is the ninth album by Argentine rock band Patricio Rey y sus Redonditos de Ricota, released in 1998. This is a more particular of the albums of the band, since they use samplers and sound effects in most of the recording. Besides the use of darker themes in the songs.

== Background ==
This is the first album recorded at the Indio Solari's home studio "Luzbola", and during the first sessions, Beilinson and Solari had creative differences, due to the idea of include new sounds in the band. However, Beilinson provided a heavier and darker sound to the songs, and Solari included special effects and lyrics without much metaphoric expressions.

The song "Pogo" is based on the John Wayne Gacy murders.

Último Bondi a Finisterre was the first album to feature Hernán Aramberri as official band member.

== Track listing ==
- All songs written by Solari/Beilinson.

No.	Title	Length
1.	"Las increíbles andanzas del Capitán Buscapina en Cybersiberia [The Captain Buscapina's Incredibles Adventures In Cybersiberia]"	4:48
2.	"Estás frito angelito [You're Fried Little Angel]"	4:34
3.	"El árbol del Gran Bonete [Big Biretta Tree]"	5:11
4.	"Gualicho [Spell]"	4:47
5.	"Pogo"	4:45
6.	"Alien Duce"	3:15
7.	"La pequeña novia del carioca [Carioca's Little Girlfriend]"	4:50
8.	"Drogocop"	3:03
9.	"Scaramanzia"	5:28
10.	"Esto es to-to-todo amigos! [That's All Folks!]"	3:37

== Data sheet ==
- Drums:El hijo de Dios [The Son of God] (Walter Sidotti)
- Bass:El guerrero audaz [(The Fearless Warrior] (Semilla Bucciarelli)
- Saxophone and Keyboard: El que guarda y protege [The one who guards and protects] (Sergio Dawi)
- Guitars and Tricks: El que gobierna la paz [The one who rules peace] (Skay Beilinson)
- Voice, badges and artifices: El varón viril y de gran fuerza [The virile man with great strength (Indio solari)
- Artifice operator: Hernán Aramberri
- Violin: Sergio Poli (Scaramanzia)
- Trumpet: Juan Cruz Urquiza (El árbol del Gran Bonete, Gualicho and Scaramanzia)
- Piano: Lito Vitale (La pequeña novia del carioca and Drogocop)
- Gunboat: Eduardo "El niño" Herrera
- Healer: Mario "El sanador" Breuer
- Gadgets: La celestial
- Virtual postcards: Rocambole
- Container concept: Cybergraph RCA/Grafikar
- Prototype technology: O. Rojas Fonum
- Cybergraphic operation: Juan Manuel Moreno, Silvio Reyes Quintana.
- Produced by: Patricio Rey Discos
- Distributed by: DBN (Distribuidora Belgrano Norte)
