= Oktubre =

Studio album by Patricio Rey y sus Redonditos de Ricota
- Released: 4 October 1986
- Recorded: August–September 1985; Panda Studios, Buenos Aires
- Genre: New wave Post-punk
- Length: 41:08
- Label: Wormo Records; Del Cielito
- Producer: Patricio Rey

Patricio Rey y sus Redonditos de Ricota chronology
Gulp! (1985)	Oktubre (1986)	Un Baión para el Ojo Idiota (1987)

Oktubre is the second studio album by Argentine rock band Patricio Rey y sus Redonditos de Ricota, released in 1986. It is the band's last album to feature to Piojo Ávalos, Tito D'Aviero and Willy Crook as band members, who left the band after the tour between late 1986 and early 1987. In 2007, the Argentine edition of Rolling Stone ranked it fourth on its list of "The 100 Greatest Albums of National Rock".

== Background ==
The album cover and its concept are inspired by the 1917 October Revolution, while the sound incorporates elements of post-punk influence in the 1980s New wave imposed by groups such as The Cure, Joy Division and The Police. The band garnered some airplay with "Ji Ji Ji" and "Ya nadie va a escuchar tu remera" and, as a result, Patricio Rey pursued a more melodic, radio friendly direction on their future albums.

Oktubre was officially released on 4 October 1986 and its presentation took place on 18 and 25 October at Paladium in front of 1200 fans. Keyboardist Andrés Teocharidis participated in both shows. Some CD bootlegs from these shows were released with Teocharidis, being his only contribution to the band due to his death in a car accident in early 1987.

Hailed by both critics and fans as the band's masterwork, the album contains some of the Patricio Rey's signature songs, such as "Ji Ji Ji", "Ya nadie va a escuchar tu remera", "Fuegos de octubre" and "Motor Psico".

== Cover ==
The cover art was designed by Ricardo Rocambole Cohen.

It is a more conceptual cover. The ideas were conceived on a Fernet night: Indio saw flags, crowds. At first it was to be all red and black, but then I added gray when I remade it in a more abstract manner. An mirrored letter gives the typography a Soviet feel. On the back cover you can see the La Plata cathedral on fire: a symbol of revolution. I find it strange to see my work on t-shirts and tattoos: people have appropriated things such as the fist and chain, which were made in 15 minutes for an ad. At Paladium, I personified Patricio Rey with an old pair of glasses.

— Rocambole

To the right side, Che Guevara's face can be distinguished.

== Track listing ==
- All songs written by Solari/Beilinson.

No.	Title	Length
1.	"Fuegos de Octubre [October Fires]"	3:42
2.	"Preso en mi ciudad [Prisoner in my city]"	4:02
3.	"Música para pastillas [Music for pills]"	4:35
4.	"Semen-Up"	5:22
5.	"Divina TV Führer [Divine Tv Führer]"	3:03
6.	"Motor psico [Psycho engine]"	4:57
7.	"Ji Ji Ji [Hee hee hee]"	5:25
8.	"Canción para naufragios [Shipwrecks Song]"	6:02
9.	"Ya nadie va a escuchar tu remera [Nobody will listen to your shirt anymore]"	3:59

== Personnel ==
Patricio Rey

- Indio Solari - Vocals.
- Skay Beilinson - Lead guitar.
- Tito "Fargo" D'Aviero - Rhythm guitar.
- Semilla Bucciarelli - Bass guitar.
- Piojo Avalos - Drums.
- Willy Crook - Saxophone.

Guests

- Daniel Melero - Keyboards.
- Claudio Cornelio - Percussion.

=== Additional personnel ===
- Osvel Costa - Engineer.
- Ricardo "Rocambole" Cohen - Cover & Art.
- Poli - Executive producer.
