= La Mosca y la Sopa =

La mosca y la sopa

Studio album by Patricio Rey y sus Redonditos de Ricota
- Released: 1991
- Recorded: 1990–1991
- Studio: Del Cielito Studios
- Genre: Rock
- Length: 38:45
- Label: Del Cielito
- Producer: Patricio Rey

Patricio Rey y sus Redonditos de Ricota chronology
¡Bang! ¡Bang!!... Estás liquidado (1989)	La mosca y la sopa (1991)	En directo (1992)

Professional ratings
Review scores
Source	Rating
Allmusic	4/5 stars

La mosca y la sopa (English: The fly and the soup) is the fifth album by Argentine rock band Patricio Rey y sus Redonditos de Ricota, released in 1991. It was recorded through 1990 and 1991. This is the third Patricio Rey album to feature Lito Vitale on the keyboards.

== Background ==
La mosca y la sopa is often cited as a major influence in the early development of the band music. Commercially, it was one of the Patricio Rey's most successful album, topping the charts in several FM radios with songs as "Toxi-Taxi", "Mi perro dinamita" and "Un poco de amor francés".

The band presented La mosca y la sopa at the Estadio Obras Sanitarias in April 1991, where had incidents with the police and the fans before the concert, where fan Walter Bulaccio was arrested, which ended with his death from severe injuries caused by members of the Argentina's Federal Police.

== Track listing ==
- All songs were written by Solari/Beilinson, except "Mi perro dinamita", written by Semilla Buccarelli.

No.	Title	Length
1.	"Toxi-Taxi"	3:38
2.	"Fusilados por la cruz roja [Shot by the Red Cross]"	4:13
3.	"Un poco de amor francés [A little French love]"	3:25
4.	"Mi perro dinamita [My dynamite dog]"	2:35
5.	"Blues de la artillería [Blues of the artillery]"	4:29
6.	"Tarea fina [Fine Task]"	3:42
7.	"El pibe de los astilleros [The kid from the shipyards]"	3:32
8.	"Nueva Roma [New Rome]"	3:13
9.	"Salando las heridas [Salting the wounds]"	5:01
10.	"Queso ruso [Russian cheese]"	4:51

== Personnel ==
Patricio Rey

- Indio Solari - Vocals
- Skay Beilinson - Guitars
- Semilla Buccarelli - Bass guitar, Piano on "Mi perro dinamita"
- Walter Sidotti - Drums and percussion
- Sergio Dawi - Saxophone

Guests

- Luis "Mississippi" Robinson - Harp on "Tarea fina"
- Lito Vitale - Piano on "Blues de la artillería"

=== Additional Personnel ===
- Rocambole - Art Cover and Design
- Mario Breuer, Roberto Fernadez and Gustavo Gaury - Engineers
- Poly - Management
