= Esperando el milagro =

Studio album by Las Pelotas
- Released: 2003
- Genre: Rock; Reggae

Las Pelotas chronology
Maxi (2002)	Esperando el milagro (2003)	Show (2005)

Esperando el milagro is the ninth album by Argentine rock band Las Pelotas. An EP ("Maxi") was released in 2002, to promote "Esperando el milagro" - it features songs "Desaparecido", "Si sentís" and "La creciente".

== Track listing ==
1. Será [It Will Be]
2. Mareada [Dizzy]
3. Tomas x
4. Desaparecido [Missing]
5. Día feliz [Happy Day]
6. Abejas [Bees]
7. Si sentís [If You Feel]
8. Tormenta en Júpiter [Storm On Jupiter]
9. Rey de los divinos [King Of The Divines]
10. Esperando el milagro [Waiting For The Miracle]
11. Tiempo de matar [Time To Kill]
12. La creciente [The Rising Tide]
13. Puede ser [It Can Be]
