= En Directo (Patricio Rey y sus Redonditos de Ricota album) =

Patricio Rey y sus Redonditos de Ricota

Live album by Patricio Rey y sus Redonditos de Ricota
- Released: 1992
- Recorded: 1992
- Genre: Rock
- Label: Del Cielito Records
- Producer: Patricio Rey

Patricio Rey y sus Redonditos de Ricota chronology
La Mosca y la Sopa (1991)	Patricio Rey y sus Redonditos de Ricota (1992)	Lobo Suelto, Cordero Atado, Vol. 1 (1993)

En Directo is the first live album by Argentine band Patricio Rey y sus Redonditos de Ricota recorded and released in 1992. It was recorded at the Estadio Obras Sanitarias in Buenos Aires.

== Track listing ==
1. Nuestro amo juega al esclavo [Our master plays a slave]
2. Barbazul versus el amor letal [Barbazul vs lethal love]
3. Yo no me caí del cielo [I didn't fall from heaven]
4. Héroe del whisky [Whisky hero]
5. La parabellum del buen psicópata [The good psychopath's parabellum]
6. Maldición, va a ser un día hermoso [Damn, it's going to be a beautiful day]
7. El blues del noticiero [News channel blues]
8. Todo un palo [An entire stick]
9. Unos pocos peligros sensatos [A few sensible dangers]
10. Criminal mambo
11. Rock para los dientes [Rock for the teeth]
12. Vamos las bandas [Let's go, bands]

== Personnel ==
- Indio Solari - Vocals
- Skay Beilinson - Guitars
- Semilla Buccarelli - Bass guitar, Piano on "Mi perro dinamita"
- Walter Sidotti - Drums and percussion
- Sergio Dawi - Saxophone
