= Un Mundo Perfecto =

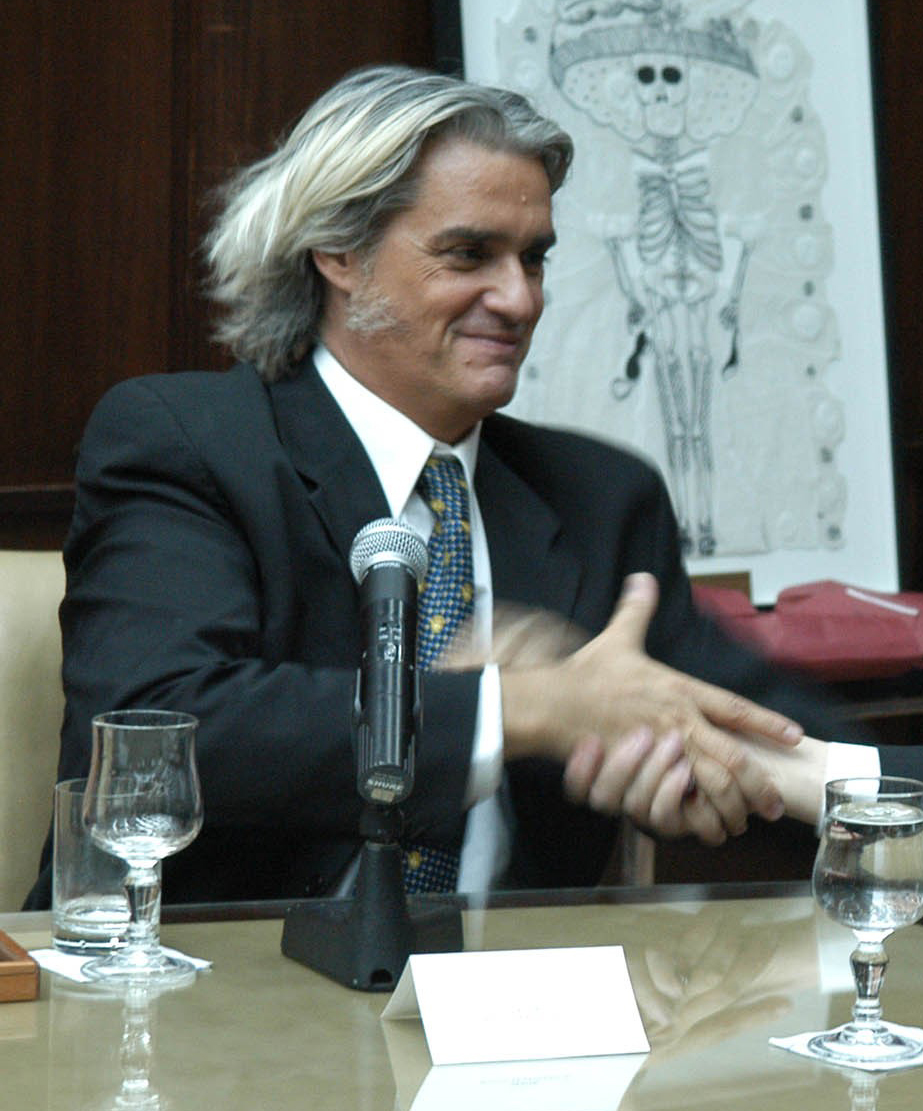
- Roberto Pettinato
- Presented by: Roberto Pettinato
- Country of origin: Argentina
- Original language: Spanish
- No. of episodes: 5

Production
- Production locations: Estudio de América TV; Buenos Aires
- Running time: approx. 31 min.

Original release
- Network: América TV
- Release: March 16, 2009 – December 31, 2011

Un mundo perfecto is an Argentinean television program hosted by comedian and musician Roberto Pettinato and distributed by América TV. The show features interviews with celebrities and members of the public, comedic monologues by the host and music performances. It premiered on March 16, 2009.
