= Roberto Pettinato =

Argentine musician, journalist, and television presenter

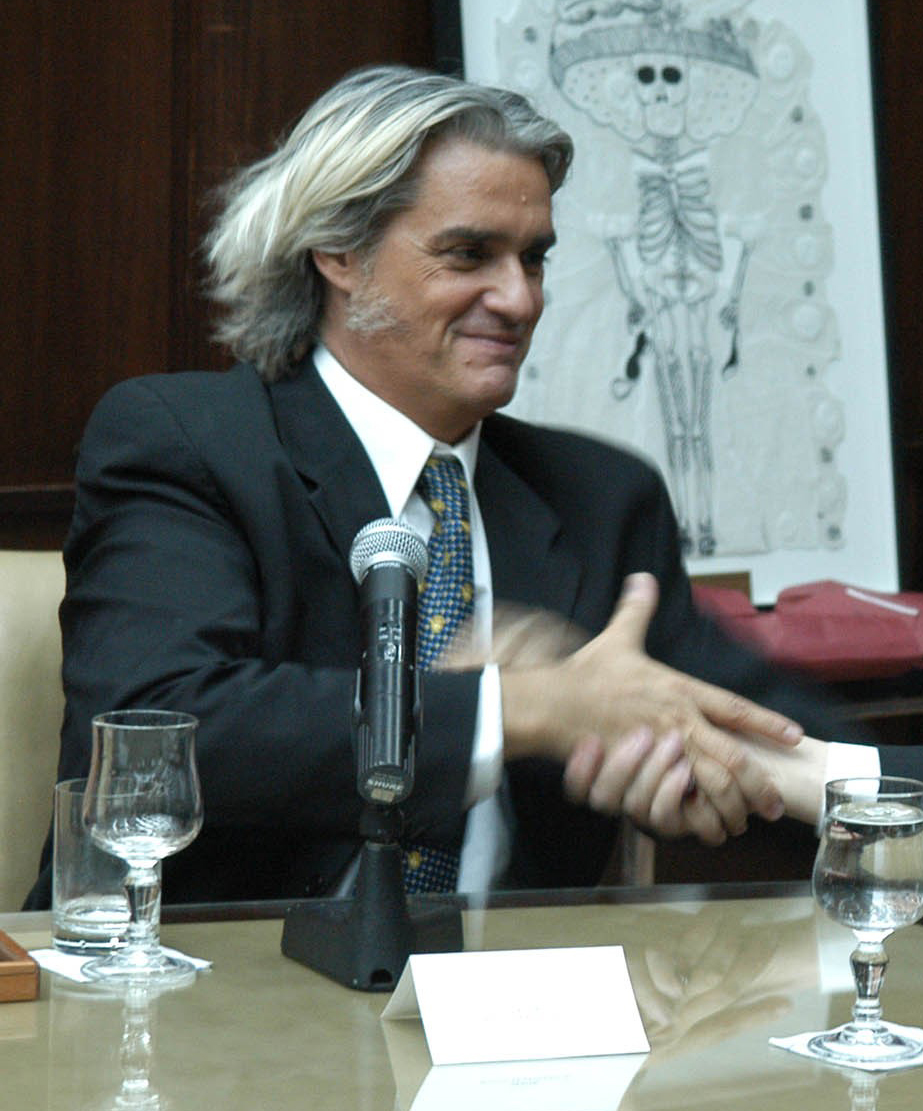
- Pettinato in December 2005

Background information
- Born: Roberto Pettinato; December 15, 1955; Buenos Aires, Argentina

Roberto Pettinato (born December 15, 1955, in Buenos Aires) is an Argentine musician, journalist, and television presenter.

== Early life ==
Pettinato's father, Roberto Sr., was a high-ranking corrections officer in the administration of Juan Perón. When a coup deposed Perón in 1955, he and his family took refuge in the embassy of Ecuador, where Roberto Jr. was born. After obtaining a safe conduct and leaving for Ecuador, the family lived in Peru and Chile until allowed to return to Argentina in 1966.

== Career ==
=== Music career ===
The younger Pettinato became involved in the Argentine rock scene of the late 1970s mostly as a journalist with the El Expreso Imaginario monthly magazine, which he directed from 1980 until its demise in 1982. In parallel, he was the on-and-off saxophonist for the 1980s band Sumo, led by Anglo-Italian Luca Prodan.

He has released a free jazz album named Free Jazz Musica Anticomercial, as Robert Pettinato & Now Free Jazz.

=== Television career ===
After Prodan's death and the band's dissolution, he started working in television together with Gerardo Sofovich, co-hosting La noche del Domingo in the early 1990s. Later on, he gained popularity by hosting Duro de acostar on Telefe, a midnight talk show modeled after David Letterman's. In the mid-1990s, he attained cult status by co-hosting post-midnight sports and showbiz show Orsai (a deformation of the football term off-side) with Gonzalo Bonadeo on one of Argentina's many sports cable channels.

As an actor, he took part in Primicias, a television series produced by Pol-Ka and broadcast by Canal 13.

He also hosted TV programs Mira quien canta, Todos al diván, Petti en vivo (Canal 9), Un aplauso para el asador (Canal 13), and the ironic Indomables (América TV) and Duro de Domar. In March 2009 he began Un Mundo Perfecto, a late-night talk show on (América TV).

Following the unexpected ending of Indomables due to a conflict between the production company PPT and América TV, the production renamed and moved the program to Canal 13, where Pettinato (as of October 2006) hosts Duro de Domar.

He has hosted since 2004 an FM radio morning show called El Show de la Noticia. He was absent from the program for over one week after a fire in his son's (Felipe Pettinato) apartment where Melchor Rodrigo, a neurologist, had died.

== Sexual misconduct accusations ==
In February 2018, several women who worked with him, including Karina Mazzoco, Mariela Anchipi, Josefina Pouso, Virginia Godoy, Ursula Vargues, and Emilia Claudeville, accused him of sexual harassment and abuse. They stated that he would "suck" their necks without their permission until he made them cry, and humiliate them in front of other people with whom they worked. For example, Josefina Pouso stated, "all those who have worked with him, the majority who have worked with him, have told something similar, worse or perhaps a little lighter, but it was still harassment or abuse." The accusers have witnesses who backed up their claims, but can not make a formal complaint before the law due to Argentine laws regarding prescription for the amount of time spent.

Pettinato has refused to talk to the media, such as the television program Intrusos, about the accusations. In the aftermath of the accusations, Pettinato left Argentina for Paraguay, alleging that he was going to start a television show in the country, but reports from both countries summarized that Pettinato left Argentina to become a "media exile" due to the accusations.
