= Alejandro Sokol =

Argentine musician (1960–2009)

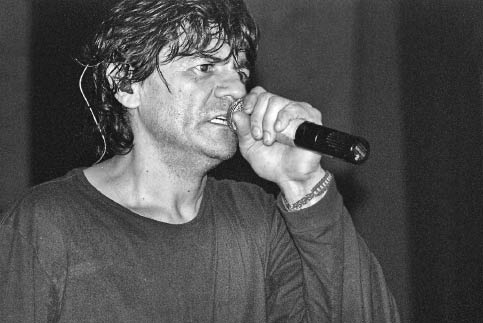
- Born: January 30, 1960; Hurlingham, Buenos Aires, Argentina
- Died: January 12, 2009 (aged 48); Río Cuarto, Córdoba Province, Argentina
- Other name: Bocha
- Occupations: Singer and composer
- Years active: 1979-2009
- Children: 3

Alejandro Sokol (30 January 1960 – 12 January 2009) was an Argentine rock musician, who was part of Sumo and Las Pelotas.

Sokol was the bassist, and then the drummer, of Sumo in its early days (1981-1984), and left the band because the rock and roll lifestyle went against his convictions, as he was a member of the LDS church.

After the death of Sumo's leader Luca Prodan, Sokol formed Las Pelotas together with fellow ex-Sumo Germán Daffunchio. After 17 years with the band, Sokol left to form his own group, El Vuelto S.A., featuring his son Ismael Sokol, Nicolás Angiolini and Gustavo Bustos (guitars), Sebastián Villegas (bass) and Damián Bustos (drums).

Sokol died in a bus depot in Río Cuarto, Córdoba Province, of cardio-respiratory failure, when waiting for a bus to take him to Buenos Aires back from the Traslasierra district, where he visited his daughter and grandchildren.
