= Skay Beilinson =

Eduardo Beilinson
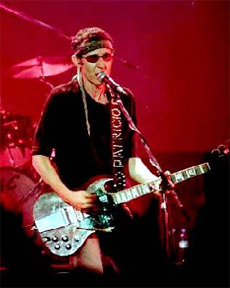

Background information
- Also known as: Skay; El Flaco
- Born: Eduardo Federico Beilinson; 15 January 1952 (age 74)
- Genres: Rock, hard rock, post-grunge, alternative rock, psychedelic rock
- Occupations: Musician, producer, composer
- Instruments: Guitar, bass, vocals
- Years active: 1968–present
- Labels: Del Cielito; Patricio Rey Discos

Eduardo "Skay" Beilinson (born January 15, 1952) is an Argentine guitarist who has played in the band Patricio Rey y sus Redonditos de Ricota, one of the most famous rock bands of Argentina. He is considered one of the best guitarists of his country, Rolling Stone magazine ranked him 6th on his list of "100 Best Argentine Guitarists". Among his influences are Jimi Hendrix, Cream, Keith Richards, Pink Floyd, Buddy Guy, Vanilla Fudge and The Byrds.

== Career ==
=== 1968–1977: Early years ===
Skay Beilinson was born in La Plata, Buenos Aires, and started playing the guitar when he was 12 years old; his teacher was Leopoldo Ezcurra. In 1968, played with his brother in Diplodocum Red & Brown, and then in La Cofradia de la Flor Solar to the early 1970s, together with Kubero Diaz.

During the decade of the 1970s and early 1980s, was leader and guitarist of the band Taxi Rural and then was member from "La Galletita" with Edelmiro Molinari, with whom he recorded one full LP in 1982, through Microfon label.

=== 1978–2001: Patricio Rey y sus Redonditos de Ricota ===
In 1978, with Carlos "Indio" Solari and Carmen "Poly" Castro formed "Patricio Rey y sus Redonditos de Ricota" that established him as the core musician in the group. The band managed to be among the most important exponents of 1980s Argentine rock with Sumo, Virus, Soda Stereo, Charly García, among others.

By the 1990s, Patricio Rey became one of the most famous bands in Argentina. It became the band's mainstream success with La Mosca y la Sopa, Lobo Suelto - Cordero Atado and Luzbelito. Also, the band began to travel to Tandil and Junín stadiums to play their shows, increasing the audience.

In 1997, Skay, Poly and Indio were the only band members who had been in all their formations, and therefore decided to take more control over the band's future decisions, until Indio decided split Patricio Rey in 2001, for a while due to creative differences with the musicians.

=== 2002–present: Solo recordings ===
Skay started playing as solo artist in 2002, and published his first solo album A través del Mar de los Sargazos. In 2004, published Talismán. After that, published his third album La marca de Caín, with the name of "Skay y los Seguidores de la Diosa Kali". In 2010, they published their fourth album ¿Dónde Vas?.

In August 2013, Skay together with his now-called band "Los Fakires" released La Luna Hueca, with Oscar Reyna as rhythm guitar, Claudio Quartero on bass, Javier Lecumberry on keyboards and "Topo" Espíndola as drummer.

In late 2013, Beilinson rejected a proposal of his former bandmate Indio Solari to meet with other members of Los Redondos.

== Equipment ==
Skay Beilinson has used many different guitar models, in an interview, said that have a variety of Gibson guitars, as SG and Les Paul. Some of his notable instruments are:

Guitars

- 1978 Gibson Les Paul Custom, mainly with Patricio Rey and solo.
- Gibson Les Paul Standard, through early 1990s.
- 1961 Gibson SG, also with Patricio Rey and solo.
- Fender Jaguar, only by studio recordings
- 1984 Ibanez Roadstar II RS135, mainly during the '80s live shows.
- PRS Santana Blue, during the late '90s live shows.

Amplifiers

- Marshall 800 White Anniversary 50.
- Marshall Jcm 900, with cabinet standart 4x12.
- Mesa/Boogie.
- Laney 88.

Effects

- Boss OD-1
- Boss Super Chorus
- Boss Blues Driver
- Roland GP 16

== Discography ==
=== With Patricio Rey y sus Redonditos de Ricota ===
- Gulp! (1985)
- Oktubre (1986)
- Un Baión para el Ojo Idiota (1987)
- ¡Bang! ¡Bang!!... Estás Liquidado (1989)
- La Mosca y la Sopa (1991)
- En Directo (1992)
- Lobo Suelto - Cordero Atado (1993)
- Luzbelito (1996)
- Último Bondi a Finisterre (1998)
- Momo Sampler (2000)

=== With La Cofradía de la Flor Solar ===
- La Cofradía de la Flor Solar (1971)
- El café de los ciegos (1997)
- Cofrádica (1998)

=== With Skay y los seguidores de la diosa Kali ===
- A través del mar de los sargazos (2002)
- Talismán (2004)
- La Marca de Caín (2007)
- ¿Dónde vas? (2010)
- La Luna Hueca (2013)
- El Engranaje de Cristal (2016)
- En el Corazón del Laberinto (2019)
- Espejismos (2023)

=== With Edelmiro Molinari ===
- Edelmiro y la Galletita (1983)

=== With Pedro Conde ===
- Sin Presupuesto (1985)

=== With El Soldado ===
- Tren de fugitivos (1997)
