= Sumo (band) =

Argentine alternative rock band

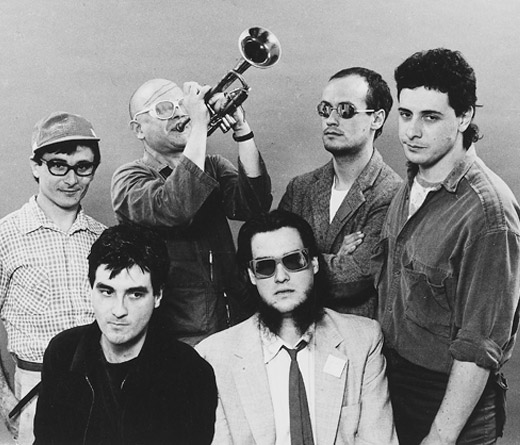
- Final Sumo lineup, fltr (above): Alberto Troglio, Luca Prodan (playing trumpet), Germán Daffunchio, Ricardo Mollo; (below, seat): Diego Arnedo, Roberto Pettinato

Background information
- Origin: Hurlingham, Buenos Aires, Argentina
- Genres: Post-punk; reggae; new wave; alternative rock
- Years active: 1981–1988; 2007
- Members: Luca Prodan (vocals); Ricardo Mollo (Guitars); Germán Daffunchio (Guitars); Diego Arnedo (Bass and Keyboards); Roberto Pettinato (Saxophone); Alberto "Superman" Troglio (drums and Percussion); Alejandro Sokol (vocals, Bass and drums)
- Past members: Stephanie Nuttal (drums); Ricardo Curtet (Guitars)

Sumo was a 1980s Argentine alternative rock band, heavily influenced by post-punk and reggae. Led by Italian-born Scottish Luca Prodan, it remained underground for most of its short activity but was extremely influential in shaping contemporary Argentine rock. Sumo is credited with introducing British post-punk to the Argentine scene, mostly by songs with lyrics in English, and with providing a visceral counterpoint to the progressive and nueva canción influences then dominant in the country's rock en español.

== History ==
=== Background ===
Luca Prodan was born in Rome on 17 May 1953 of Italian and Scottish descent after his family returned from China: His father had set up a prosperous business in ancient Chinese pottery that became untenable after the Japanese invasion of China during World War II.

In his youth, Luca was sent to prestigious Gordonstoun College in Scotland—the same Prince Charles of England attended. He escaped Gordonstoun a year before graduation and moved to London soon after.

In the 1970s London Luca worked at EMI and formed his first band, The New Clear Heads, which shared aesthetics with contemporary punk acts like XTC, The Fall, Joy Division (a name he later translated to Spanish for Sumo's first album Divididos por la Felicidad) and Wire.

After living in London and Manchester—where he was allegedly seen hanging out with Joy Division band members—Prodan accepted an invitation from Gordonstoun schoolmate Timmy Mackern to visit his family farm in the Traslasierra zone of Córdoba province in Argentina, thus helping his old friend relax and stay away from heroin (Luca was devastated by the suicide of his sister Claudia, and her boyfriend).

Arriving in 1981, he started composing and recording songs at home in a portable studio he had brought from London. Later, tired of the quiet countryside life, he and Timmy relocated in Buenos Aires' Hurlingham area, interested to join the town's underground music scene.

=== Luca in Argentina and early Sumo ===
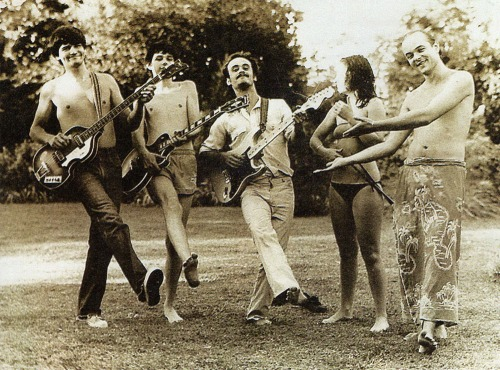
First Sumo line-up, 1981: Alejandro Sokol, Ricardo Curtet, Germán Daffunchio, Stephanie Nuttal, Luca Prodan.

Argentina was under a repressive military dictatorship, and many music and performing art acts kept a low profile to avoid problems with the police—Café Einstein in the Balvanera district was a favorite venue for such programmes as were some pubs in Olivos. Luca soon found musicians willing to join his then innovative reggae-rock vision.

Sumo's initial lineup consisted of Prodan on vocals and guitar, Germán Daffunchio on guitar, Alejandro Sokol on bass, and Stephanie Nuttal (an English friend of Luca's and former member of the band Manicured Noise) on drums.

The first incarnation of Sumo played mostly around Prodan's neighborhood of Hurlingham, in the Buenos Aires province, and in Café Einstein. Nuttal had to return to England when the Falklands War (Spanish: Guerra de las Malvinas/Guerra del Atlántico Sur) started, so Sokol took on the drums while young Hurlingham neighbour Diego Arnedo joined on bass. Then journalist and later media star Roberto Pettinato was a frequent guest to jam with his saxophone; he ended up joining the band fully shortly after.

Because of their lyrics in English, Sumo did not enjoy extensive airplay given to other Argentine bands in the wake of the war. In spite of that, it became a pillar of the underground scene together with Patricio Rey y sus Redonditos de Ricota and Los Violadores.

Sumo music had different sides: hard-edged rock with an experimental touch, influenced by the sound of British post-punk acts (e g Joy Division, The Fall), funky post-punk guitars and strong dub-like bass lines reminiscent of A Certain Ratio and Gang of Four's, and a typically British brand of reggae and ska. After a hiatus due to Prodan's temporary return to Europe, the band committed fully to a rock style in 1984 and spun off the Hurlingham Reggae Band. Ricardo Mollo was added on guitar and Alberto Superman Troglio replaced Sokol on drums—even if he stayed in the band as a vocalist, bassist (when he played bass, Arnedo played keyboards) and drummer (when he played drums, Troglio did the percussion).

=== Success, popularity and demise ===
Sumo started to become a popular act in the mid-1980s as Luca's in-your-face style caught up deeply among teenagers, even if his music could also display a mellower streak. He would shout "fuck you" randomly or sing a scathing song about dumb blondes, and immediately swoon about his appreciation for common, working-class men drinking ginebra at a bar.

In Sumo's later releases some Spanish language lyrics were added to the band's repertoire. Many of Luca's lyrics featured irony, wordplay and references to drugs, dance parties, sex and other aspects of young people's lives, while remaining aloof of the political and economic changes in the Argentina of the 80s.

The band's history was linked to entrepreneur Omar Chabán, who was the owner of Café Einstein and celebrated Buenos Aires alternative nightclub Cemento—where Sumo played many times.

Due to his drinking habit and vertiginous rock-and-roll lifestyle, Prodan's health deteriorated. He died of a heart attack on 22 December 1987—two days after their last show. After Luca's passing the band dissolved but its legacy was carried on by two bands, Divididos (led by Mollo and Arnedo) and Las Pelotas (Sokol and Daffunchio's project). Some of Sumo's outtakes and their seminal recording Corpiños en la madrugada -- originally sold in cassette format only—were released commercially. Two solo cuts by Prodan recorded between 1981 and 1983 were also released posthumously, "Time, Fate, Love" and "Beautiful Losers".

Tributes to Sumo include a 1995 double album fittingly titled "Fuck You"—with famous Argentine musicians' covers of Sumo tracks.

On 12 April 2007 surviving original band members Alejandro Sokol (vocals), Ricardo Mollo (guitar), Germán Daffunchio (guitar), Diego Arnedo (bass), Alberto Superman Troglio (drums), Roberto Pettinato (sax) and Marcelo Rodríguez "Gillespi" as guest trumpetist reunited and played three songs -- Crua Chan, Divididos por la Felicidad and DeBeDe—during Quilmes Rock Festival at River Plate Stadium.

Early Sumo vocalist, bassist and drummer Alejandro Sokol died on 12 January 2009.

== Band members ==
=== 1981-1982 ===
- Luca Prodan (vocals, acoustic guitar and bass guitar)
- Alejandro Sokol (bass guitar, vocals)
- Germán Daffunchio (guitar)
- Ricardo Curtet (guitar)
- Stephanie Nutall (drums)

=== 1982-1984 ===
- Luca Prodan (vocals, guitar)
- Alejandro Sokol (drums)
- Germán Daffunchio (guitar)
- Diego Arnedo (bass guitar)
- Roberto Pettinato (saxophone)

=== 1984-1987 ===
- Luca Prodan (vocals)
- Alberto "Superman" Troglio (drums and percussion)
- Roberto Pettinato (saxophone, piano and accordion)
- Diego Arnedo (bass guitar and double bass)
- Ricardo Mollo (guitar)
- Germán Daffunchio (guitar)

== Discography ==
- Corpiños en la madrugada (released as demo, 1983)
- Divididos por la felicidad (1985)
- Llegando los monos (1986)
- After chabon (1987)
- Fiebre (posthumous, 1989)

=== Compilations ===
- Greatest Hits (1988)
- The Collection (1991)
- Corpiños en la madrugada (remastered release, 1992)
- Obras Cumbres (2000)
