= Indio Solari =

Argentine musician (1949–2026)

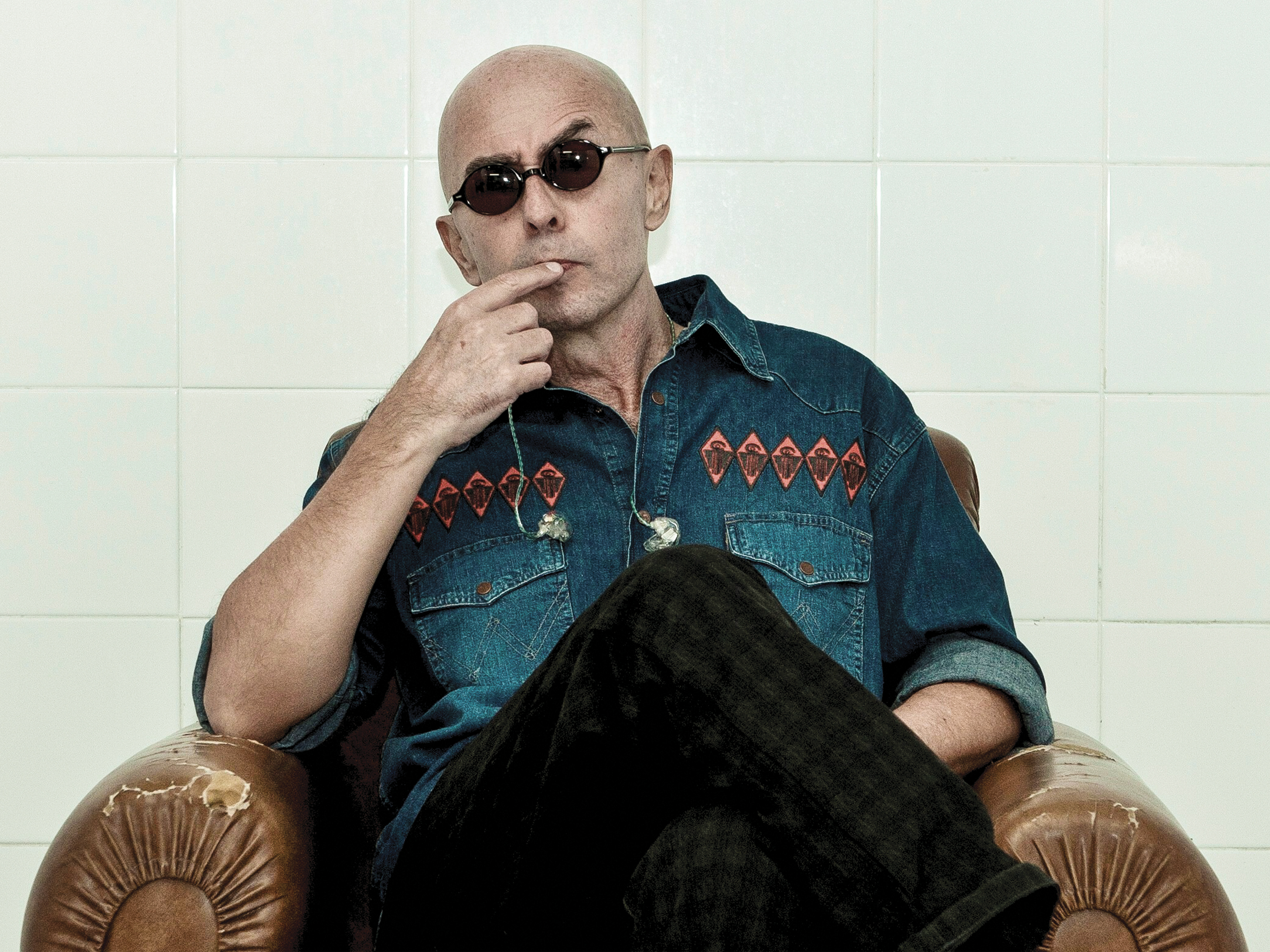
- Solari in 2011

Background information
- Also known as: Indio
- Born: Carlos Alberto Solari; 17 January 1949; Paraná, Entre Ríos, Argentina
- Died: 5 June 2026 (aged 77) Parque Leloir, Ituzaingó, Buenos Aires, Argentina
- Genres: Argentine rock; alternative rock; hard rock; post-grunge; post-punk
- Occupations: Musician; singer; producer
- Instrument: Vocals
- Years active: 1960s–2026
- Labels: Del Cielito; Luzbola; DBN
- Website: indiosolarioficial.com

Carlos Alberto Solari (17 January 1949 – 5 June 2026), known as Indio Solari, was an Argentine musician and singer. Solari was the leader of the influential rock band Patricio Rey y sus Redonditos de Ricota.

Before launching his musical career in the late 1970s in La Plata, he moved within the local underground scene. In 1976, he co-founded Patricio Rey y sus Redonditos de Ricota, remaining its lead vocalist and frontman until the band's dissolution in 2001. Following the split, Solari launched a highly successful solo career in 2004, backing himself with his new band, Los Fundamentalistas del Aire Acondicionado, with whom he released five studio albums.

Widely recognized for his cryptic lyrics, massive cultural impact, and unparalleled drawing power —particularly among the working-class youth— Solari became an icon of Argentine counterculture. His 2017 show in Olavarría became the largest open-air concert in the history of Argentine rock. Solari died on 5 June 2026 at the age of 77, ten years after being diagnosed with Parkinson's disease.

== Life and career ==
In the 1970s, Solari met his friend Guillermo Beilinson (Skay's elder brother) in a small fabric printing workshop in Valeria del Mar, called "El Mercurio". By then, Solari was already listed in his city as an enigmatic character by his harsh discourse and unconventional behavior.

In 1976, Solari started a project with Beilinson brothers and various musicians, which would be the beginning of Patricio Rey y sus Redonditos de Ricota, and he remained as singer until the band eventually split in 2001.

After the separation of Los Redondos, Solari started his first solo project in 2004: El Tesoro de los Inocentes (Bingo Fuel), together with his band Los Fundamentalistas del Aire Acondicionado, which was later presented in Argentina and Uruguay. In December 2007, The Fundamentalistas second album was released: Porco Rex, which was much less complex and very poetic. In the prologue he says: “Loneliness is the playing yard of Porco Rex”.

In 2010, Solari and his band released El Perfume de la Tempestad, edited on CD and vinyl.

In late 2013, Solari and Los Fundamentalistas released their fourth studio album: Pajaritos, bravos muchachitos, which includes a song recorded with his old bandmates Semilla Bucciarelli, Walter Sidotti and Sergio Dawi.

Indio Solari's recital in Olavarría, in 2017 occurred on March 11, 2017 at the La Colmena rural property. This was the largest open-air rock concert in the history of Argentine rock. Over 250,000 fans attended the concert by Solari and his band.

== Death ==
Solari died in Parque Leloir, Ituzaingó Partido, Buenos Aires, on 5 June 2026, ten years after his Parkinson's disease diagnosis. He was 77. The Public Prosecutors' Office in Morón stated that Solari was found by the side of an indoor pool of his home, apparently after suffering a fall.

== Discography ==
=== With Patricio Rey y sus Redonditos de Ricota ===
- Gulp! (1985)
- Oktubre (1986)
- Un Baión para el Ojo Idiota (1987)
- ¡Bang! ¡Bang!!... Estás Liquidado (1989)
- La Mosca y la Sopa (1991)
- En Directo, live (1992)
- Lobo Suelto – Cordero Atado (1993)
- Luzbelito (1996)
- Último Bondi a Finisterre (1998)
- Momo Sampler (2000)

=== With El Soldado ===
- Tren de fugitivos (1997)

=== With Los Fundamentalistas del Aire Acondicionado ===
- El Tesoro de los Inocentes (Bingo Fuel) (2004)
- Porco Rex (2007)
- El Perfume de la Tempestad (2010)
- Pajaritos, bravos muchachitos (2013)
- El Ruiseñor, El Amor y La Muerte. (2018)

=== With Lito Vitale ===
- Escuchame en el Ruido (2006)

=== With Sergio Dawi ===
- Estrellados (2008)

=== With Baltazar Comotto ===
- Blindado (2011)
