= Las Pelotas =

Argentine rock band

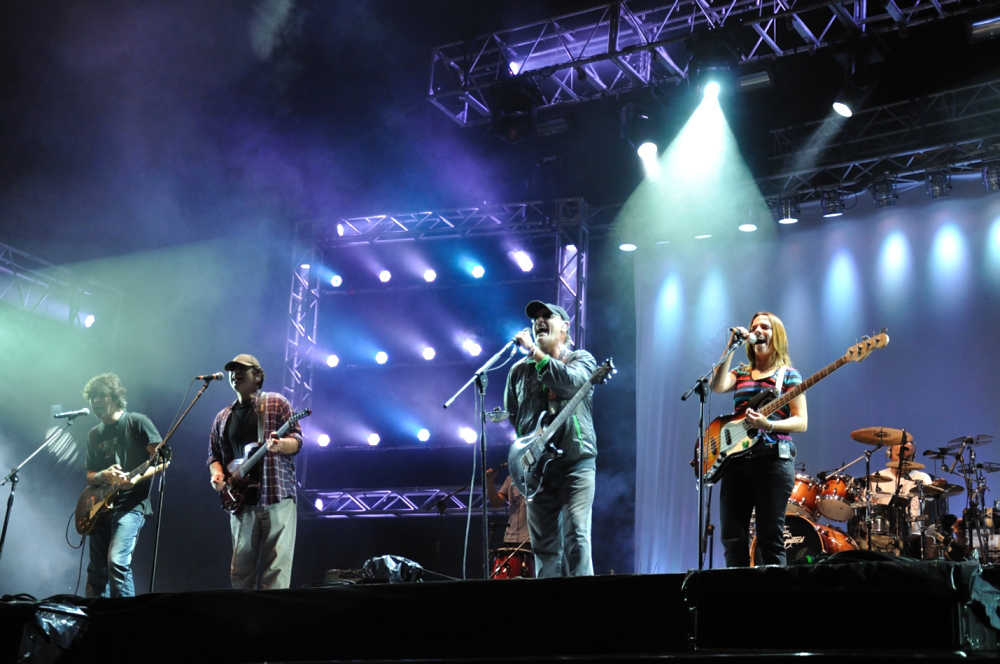
- Las Pelotas in live, 2010.

Background information
- Origin: Córdoba, Argentina
- Genres: Rock, pop, reggae, funk
- Years active: 1988–present
- Spinoff of: Sumo
- Members: Germán Daffunchio; Tomás Sussmann; Gabriela Martínez; Gustavo Jove; Sebastián Schachtel; Alejandro Gómez
- Past members: Alejandro Sokol (†); Gustavo Kupinski (†); Alberto "Superman" Troglio "Willy" Robles; Hernando "Tito" Flores; Guido Nisenson; Gillespi

Las Pelotas (in English: The Balls, or more idiomatically, Bollocks!, since the band name is a play of words between those two meanings); is an Argentine rock and reggae band from Córdoba. This band was formed after the separation of Sumo, due to the death of their singer, Luca Prodan in 1987. The group currently consists of vocalist and guitarist, Germán Daffunchio, Gabriela Martínez on bass, Tomás Sussman on guitar, Sebastián Schachtel on keyboards and Gustavo Jove on drums. Their original vocalist, Alejandro Sokol, was part of the band from 1988 to 2008 as he began a solo career, cut short by his sudden death in 2009.

The musical style of the band is an eclectic genre mix of rock, pop, reggae, funk and ballads.

== Discography ==
- Corderos en la noche (1991)
- Máscaras de sal (1994)
- Amor seco (1995)
- La clave del éxito (1997)
- Para qué? (1998)
- Todo por un polvo (1999)
- Selección (2000)
- Maxisimple (2002)
- Esperando el milagro (2003)
- Show (2005)
- Basta (2007)
- Despierta (2009)
- Vivo (2011)
- Cerca de las nubes (2012)
- 5x5 (2014)
- Brindando por nada (2016)
- Es así (2020)

== See also ==
- Divididos
