= Tandil Partido =

Tandil Partido de Tandil
- Department
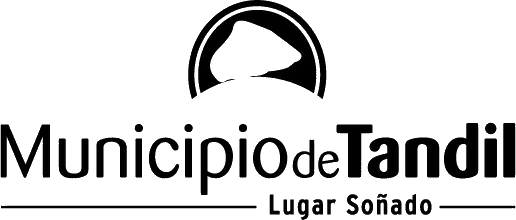

- location of Tandil Partido in Buenos Aires Province
- Coordinates: 37°04′S 59°08′W
- Country: Argentina
- Established: April 4, 1823
- Founder: Martin Rodriguez
- Seat: Tandil

Government
  - Intendant: Miguel Ángel Lunghi (UCR-JxC)

Area
  - Total: 4,935 km^{2} (1,905 sq mi)

Population
  - Total: 108,109
  - Density: 21.91/km^{2} (56.74/sq mi)
- Demonym: tandilense
- Postal Code: B2740
- IFAM: BUE121
- Area Code: 02478
- Patron saint: ?
- Website: tandil.gov.ar

Tandil Partido is a partido (Administrative territorial entity of Buenos Aires Province, Argentina) of Buenos Aires Province in Argentina.

The provincial subdivision has a population of about 108,000 inhabitants in an area of 4,935 km^{2} (1,905 sq mi), and its capital city is Tandil, which is around 350 km (220 mi) from Buenos Aires.

== Settlements ==
- Tandil
- María Ignacia
- Gardey
- De la Canal
- Desvío Aguirre

== Attractions ==
- Tandil Plaza Independencia
- Tandil Lake
- Piedra Movediza (Moving Rock)
- Sierra del Tigre
- Club Deportivo Santamarina, football club
- Tandil Hipódromo, horse racing venue
- Valle Escondido Club de Golf
- Tandil Aeroclub

== Notable people ==
- Mauro Camoranesi (October 4, 1976), footballer
- Mariano González (May 5, 1981), footballer
- Guillermo Pérez Roldán (October 20, 1969), tennis player
- Mariano Zabaleta (February 28, 1978), tennis player
- Juan Martín del Potro (September 23, 1988), tennis player
- Juan Mónaco (March 29, 1984), tennis player
- René Lavand (September 24, 1928), magician
- Víctor Laplace (May 30, 1943), actor
- Mauricio Macri (February 8, 1959), 56th President of Argentina

== Gallery ==
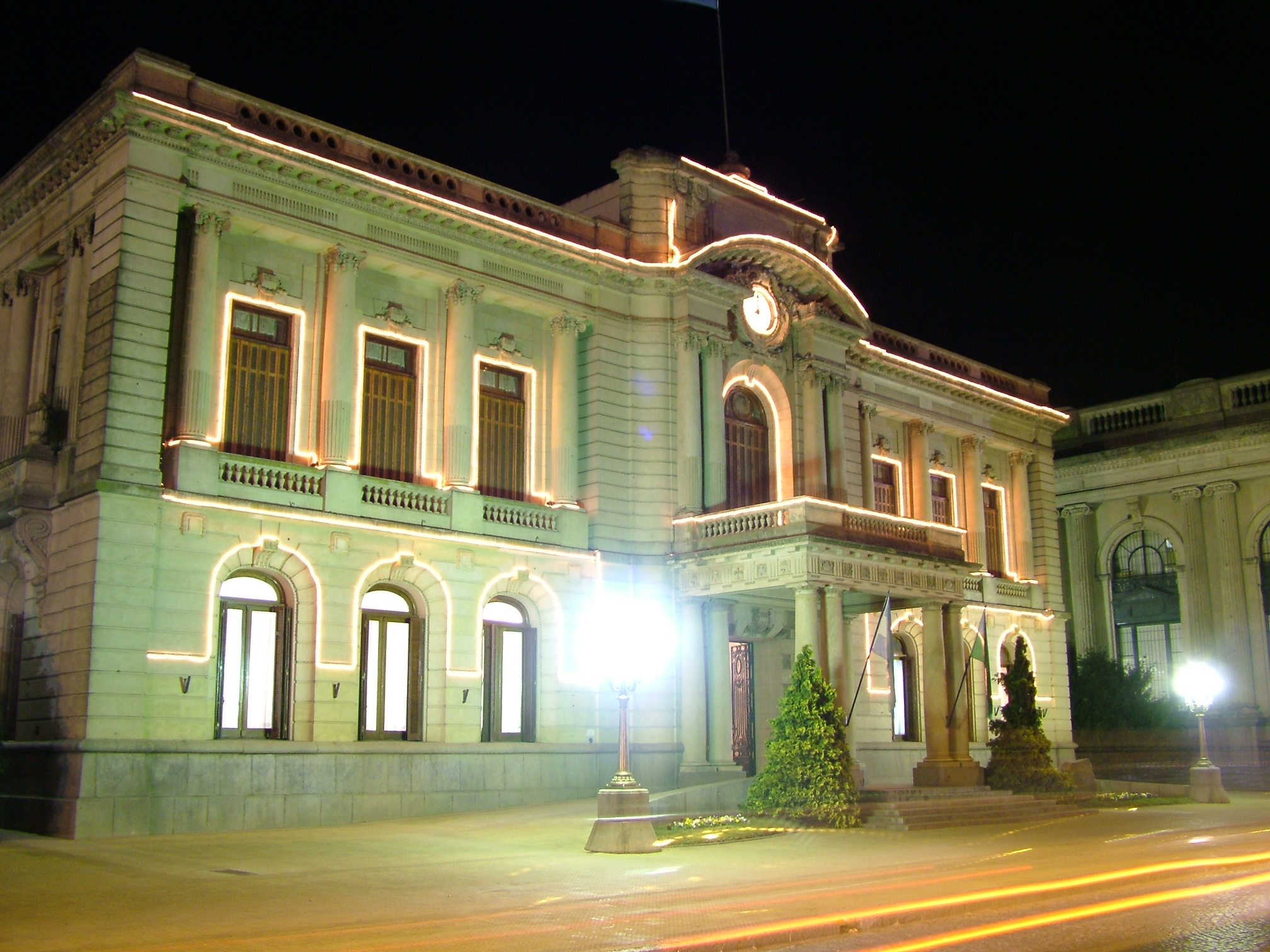
Municipal Palace

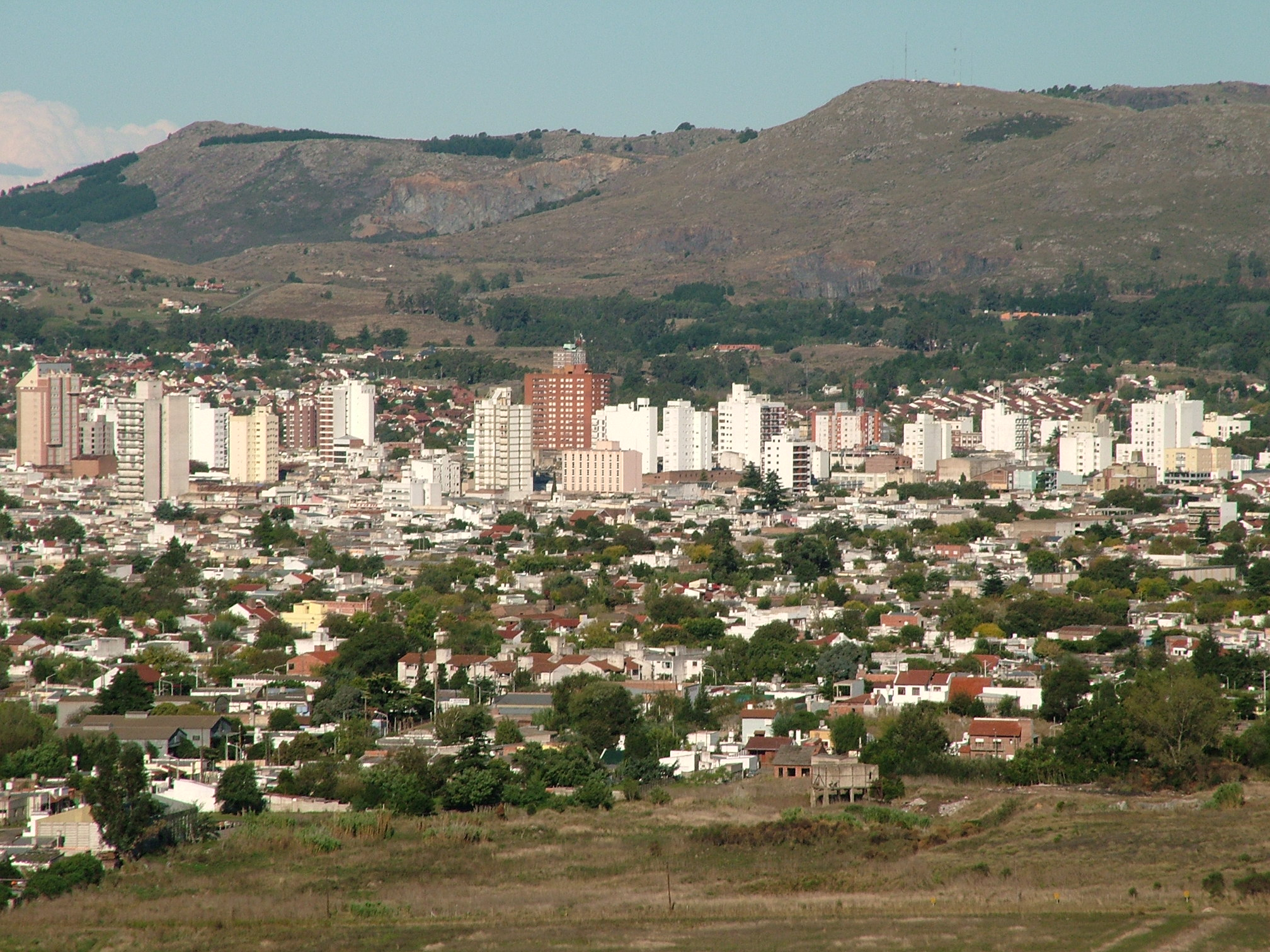
Tandil city

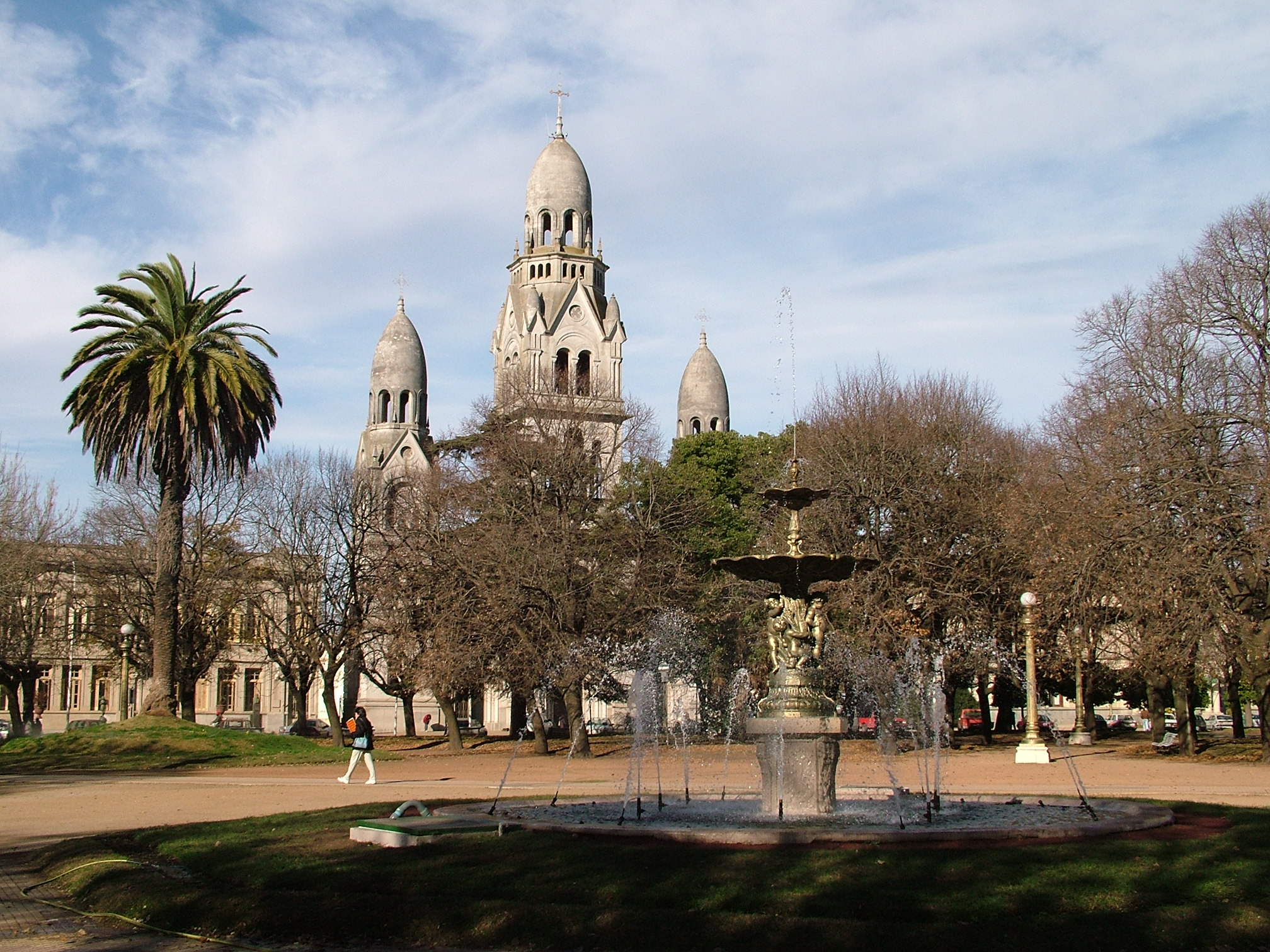
Plaza Independencia
