= Patricio Rey y sus Redonditos de Ricota =

Musical group of Argentina

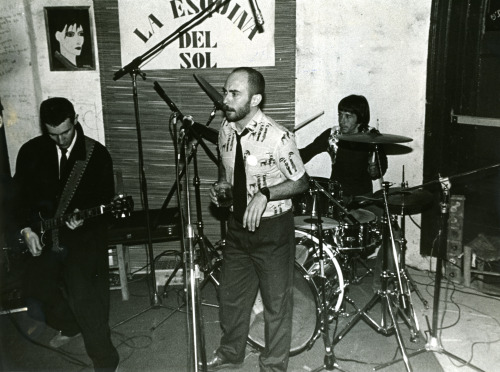
- Patricio Rey y sus Redonditos de Ricota performing live, 1970s

Background information
- Also known as: Los Redondos; Los Redonditos de Ricota; Patricio Rey
- Origin: La Plata, Buenos Aires, Argentina
- Genres: Argentine rock Post-punk; New wave Art rock Blues rock Hard rock Alternative rock
- Years active: 1976–2001
- Labels: Wormo; Del Cielito; Patricio Rey Discos
- Past members: Indio Solari; Skay Beilinson; Semilla Bucciarelli; Walter Sidotti; Sergio Dawi; Willy Crook; Hernán Aramberri; Andrés Teochiaridis; Tito "Fargo" D´Aviero; Daniel "Piojo" Ávalos; Conejo Jolivet; Roddy Castro; César "El pipa" Barboza; Daniel Fenton

Patricio Rey y sus Redonditos de Ricota, also known simply as Patricio Rey, Los Redondos or Los Redonditos de Ricota, was a rock band formed in La Plata, Argentina. The group was active from the mid 1970s up to the early 2000s. They are known for shaping Argentine rock and their enormous fan base.

== Name ==
Patricio Rey is the name of a fictional character or group consciousness, and not a real person or member of the group, Los redonditos de ricota (lit. "the small ricotta 'roundies'") is the colloquial name of a variety of home-made buñuelos filled with ricotta cheese, round in shape (hence the name).

== History ==
=== The beginning: 1976–1984 ===
The band was formed in 1976 by lead singer Carlos "El Indio" Solari and guitarist Skay Beilinson, and to play at various bars and clubs in La Plata, Solari and Beilinson’s hometown. Skay had played for other bands, such as La Cofradía de la Flor Solar, where he met with the artist and illustrator Ricardo "Rocambole" Cohen, who became the band’s only graphic designer. By the late 1970s, the band did their first tour through Argentina, mainly in the country's northwest.

In 1982, Solari and the Beilinson brothers moved to Buenos Aires, recorded a demo and signed with a major label. The rest of the musicians were the young bassist Semilla Bucciarelli, Rodolfo Gorosito on rhythm guitar and the drummer Alejandro Pensa (cousin of the luthier Rudy Pensa). Also, Skay (together with Alejandro) had a stint as guitarist of the Edelmiro Molinari's band La Galletita.

Their first deal was for RCA, and they immediately realized the need for a professional session to record a demo tape, which included "Super Lógico", "Mariposa Pontiac", "Pura Suerte" and other songs. After this, RCA refused to hire Patricio Rey, because they weren’t confident in the track-list.

They started getting spins in a few Buenos Aires' radio stations, gaining positive responses from the radio presenter and journalist Lalo Mir and the general public. Patricio Rey gained popularity in the underground scene. An important aspect of this rise in popularity was the group's successful performances in places such as Teatro Bambalinas, Stud Free Pub, Go! Disco and La Esquina del Sol.

In 1984, Alejandro Pensa and Rodolfo Gorosito left the band, and were replaced by Piojo Ávalos and Tito "Fargo" D'Aviero, respectively. That same year Patricio Rey y sus Redonditos de Ricota got a new record deal with the Wormo label.

=== Breakthrough success: 1985–1990 ===
In August 1985, the group released their first studio LP Gulp, that included tracks such as "La Bestia Pop", "Superlógico", and "El Infierno Está Encantador esta Noche" that got various spins in the radio. They had kicked off a tour in March, but the album was presented officially at Cemento, after the cancelled gigs at the Teatro Astros, by the Valeria Lynch shows.

In September of the next year, the tour finished while the band was working on their second LP, Oktubre, with Daniel Melero and Claudio Cornelio as guests, and the last with Tito D'Aviero, Willy Crook and Piojo Ávalos. The LP included more "mainstream" hooks, but still kept the classic feel of the group.

After the departure of D'Aviero, Crook and Ávalos, which put Solari and Beilinson at the artistic centre of the band, drummer Walter Sidotti and saxophonist Sergio Dawi were added to the line-up in 1987, remaining with the band as continuous members.

During the late 1980s, the band recorded with the two new members their albums Un Baión para el Ojo Idiota in 1987, the last made under the Wormo label and ¡Bang! ¡Bang! Estás Liquidado in January 1989, which was the first published by Del Cielito Records, as well the shows made in Uruguay for the first time.

Both of those LPs were the first nods to a more commercial sound, with simpler songs that brought back some classic rock influences, but the band's strength, which lies in the semantic power of its lyrics, that discuss, but isn’t limited to, politics, drugs and women with a philosophical and existentialist approach, stayed constant. The obscurity and complexity of Solari's writing often was compared with Baroque writers, particularly Francisco de Quevedo, but with a corrosive approach to the present day, being Neoliberalism in Argentina, the Gulf War, political corruption, the media, drug culture and the dark aspects of love.

Los Redonditos de Ricota recorded at the Del Cielito studio in Parque Leloir. The studio was located in a quiet residential area of Parque Leloir, in Ituzaingó, on the western edge of Greater Buenos Aires. Gustavo Gauvry, who founded Del Cielito Records in 1980 as the country's first independent record label, built the studio after moving to the property. Gauvry had grown up in Olivos and bought two plots of land in Parque Leloir.

=== The Estadio Obras Incident: 1991 ===
The first negative media event that hurt Patricio Rey y sus Redonditos de Ricota was during their 1991 show at the Estadio Obras Sanitarias, where a young man called Walter Bulacio was stopped and arrested for incidents, which ended with his death from severe injuries caused by the police.

After the incidents in Obras, the city’s authorities imposed an order to ban the band from performing live.

That same year, the band released their fifth studio album La Mosca y la Sopa, one of the band's most successful albums to date.

=== Back to stages, Lobo Suelto, Cordero Atado and Luzbelito: 1992–1997 ===
Then, Los Redondos gets the municipality of Tandil, Buenos Aires, to allow the group to play without legal problems. At the time, they had edited their only live album En Directo in 1992, although it was not officially endorsed by the Del Cielito label then. By 1993, Los Redondos released Lobo Suelto, Cordero Atado, in two volumes. The first album includes the hit single "Un Ángel Para tu Soledad", which became the band's new signature song and a perennial radio favorite.

The return of Patricio Rey to the big stage occurred in 1994, at the Estadio Huracán, in front of 80,000 fans. In San Carlos, Santa Fe province, in August 1995, where they performed two shows in a nightclub with a capacity of 3000 people, which was completely filled.

In 1996, they released the eighth studio album Luzbelito, another one of the band's biggest albums, recorded between Brazil, United States and Buenos Aires.

Patricio Rey closed the year with two dates on October 26 and 27 at the Estadio Polideportivo in Mar del Plata and at the Estadio 15 de Abril, Unión de Santa Fe on the anniversary of the band, on December 28.

=== New sounds, struggles and break-up: 1998–2001 ===
In late December 1998, they performed at the Estadio Racing Club with Hernán Aramberri as keyboardist and "Conejo" Jolivet as special guest, to present Último Bondi a Finisterre, their ninth studio album. The two shows with more than 45,000 fans, were guarded by the police and a crew of firefighters at the stadium, where an audience member threw a flare to the stage causing minor damages and the anger of Solari.

One of the band's most important achievements was to reunite more than 140,000 fans at River Plate Stadium, Buenos Aires, in April 2000, proving the band's popularity, and like the Racing Stadium concerts, was heavily guarded by the police and stadium authorities. At the April 15 show, Jorge Ríos, a thief who was in the audience began to attack several people with a knife, and then he was lynched by the people. That same year, Momo Sampler was released.

In 2001, Patricio Rey played at the Centenario Stadium, in Uruguay with two dates on April 22 and 23. Finally, Momo Sampler Tour's last show was at the Chateau Carreras, Córdoba on August 4. By November of that same year, it was announced via website that Patricio Rey had disbanded, mainly due to internal tensions within Indio Solari and the rest of the band.

=== After the split and solo projects: 2002–present ===
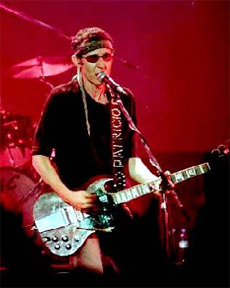
Skay Beilinson was the first in embark on a solo career

After the break-up, several former members are still active and pursuing solo careers and new projects. Skay published his first album: A través del Mar de los Sargazos in 2002.

Indio Solari in the late 2004 formed a new band: Los Fundamentalistas del Aire Acondicionado, with Marcelo Torres on bass guitar, Pablo Sbaraglia on keyboards, Julio Saez (then replaced by Gaspar Benegas) and Baltazar Comotto on guitars, and Hernán Aramberri and Martín Carrizo on drums, with Sergio Colombo and Miguel Ángel Tallarita as horn section. The band had released 4 albums.

Walter Sidotti returned with his band La Favorita between 1997 and 2004, to travel to Spain. Today, Sidotti plays regularly both with his own band and with Sergio Dawi in some Patricio Rey tribute shows.

Semilla Bucciarelli works as painter and illustrator, producing some works for La Renga's Detonador de Sueños in 2003, La Favorita and the Le Mie Parole cover in 2013, for Jesús Granero. Sergio Dawi formed Dossaxos2 with Damián Nisenson, then recorded in 2004, Estrellados his first solo album. In 2007, he created the interactive-visual group "VideoSaxMachine". In 2008, he released his second solo album Quijotes al ajillo, together with Juan Benítez on guitar, Mariano Pirato on piano, guitar and backing vocals, Martín Tabuyo on bass, Pablo Belmes on drums and Rodrigo Collado as DJ. The album features "Gato Negro", a duet with his former bandmate Indio.

In 2005, the band received the Konex Award as Best Rock Group of the 1995–2005 decade, a distinction shared with Divididos.

== Band members ==
Core members (1987–2001)

- Indio Solari - lead vocals (died 2026)
- Skay Beilinson - guitars
- Semilla Bucciarelli - bass guitar
- Walter Sidotti - drums
- Sergio Dawi - saxophone

Other members

- Guillermo Beilinson - backing and lead vocals (1976–1984)
- Pepe Fenton - bass guitar (1976–1980)
- Ricky Rodrigo - violin, rhythm guitar, synthesizer (1976–1982)
- Bernardo Rubaja - keyboards (1976–1978)
- Beto Verne - lead guitar (1976–1980)
- Basilo Rodrigo - lead guitar (1976–1978)
- Ricardo Meyer - lead guitar (1978)
- "Conejo" Jolivet - lead guitar (1978; 1993, 1997–1998 as live guest)
- León Vanella - lead guitar (1978)
- Daniel D'Aloisio - bass guitar (1981–1982)
- Diego Rodriguez - drums (1981–1982)
- Laura Hutton - backing vocals (1982–1984)
- Rodolfo Gorosito - rhythm guitar (1982–1984)
- Alejandro Pensa - drums (1982–1984)
- Tito "Fargo" D'Aviero - rhythm guitar (1984–1987)
- Daniel "Piojo" Ávalos - drums (1984–1987)
- Willy Crook - saxophone (1984–1987; 1993, 1999 as guest; died 2021)
- Andrés Teocharidis - keyboards (1986–1987; died 1987)
- Hernán Aramberri - sampler, MIDI programming, keyboards (1993, 1997–2001)

Frequent collaborators

- Carmen Castro ("La Negra Poly") - manager
- Ricardo Cohen ("Rocambole") - graphic artist
- Enrique Symns - spoken word, monologues
- Lito Vitale - piano, keyboards

Timeline

== Discography ==
- Gulp! (1985)
- Oktubre (1986)
- Un Baión para el Ojo Idiota (1988)
- ¡Bang! ¡Bang!... Estás Liquidado (1989)
- La Mosca y la Sopa (1991)
- En Directo, Live (1992)
- Lobo Suelto - Cordero Atado, Vol. 1 (1993)
- Lobo Suelto - Cordero Atado, Vol. 2 (1993)
- Luzbelito (1996)
- Último Bondi a Finisterre (1998)
- Momo Sampler (2000)
