= Claudia Villafañe =

Argentine businesswoman and producer

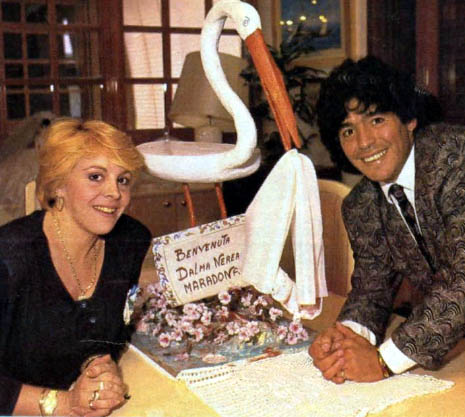
- Villafañe with her ex-husband Diego Maradona in 1987
- Born: Claudia Rosana Villafañe; January 22, 1962 (age 64); Buenos Aires, Argentina
- Occupations: Businesswoman; producer
- Spouse: Diego Maradona (m. 1989; div. 2003)
- Children: Dalma Maradona; Giannina Maradona

Claudia Rosana Villafañe (born January 22, 1962) is an Argentine businesswoman and producer, known for being Diego Maradona's wife and the winner of the first MasterChef Celebrity Argentina edition.

== Biography ==
Villafañe was born in Buenos Aires, the daughter of Ana María Elía and Roque Nicolás Villafañe. She is known internationally for her marriage to Diego Maradona whom she met when she was 17 years old in Villa Fiorito, Buenos Aires. She got married in Estadio Luna Park on 7 November 1989 in a dress designed by Elsa Serrano. From this intense and also stormy relationship and being pregnant with her first daughter, Dalma, she learned on television that Maradona had become the father of Diego Sinagra who was born to Cristiana Sinagra. But Maradona denied that paternity and although justice forced him to give the boy his surname, he continued to deny it for more than thirty years. He denied it to his wife, to his daughters, to his own son and to any journalist who would ask.

Villafañe filed for divorce from Maradona on 7 March 1998 for abandoning the home, after being married for 13 years, claiming custody of their daughters, Dalma and Gianina, who at that time were 15 and 12 years old respectively.

In 2017, after 10 years of dating, she announced her relationship with businessman and actor Jorge Taiana.

== Career ==
In 1999, Villafañe made a participation of herself in the telenovela Muñeca brava starring Natalia Oreiro and Facundo Arana. She was invited in several entertainment programs such as Sábado bus, Susana Giménez, Escape perfecto, La caula de la moda, Pasapalabra, Caiga Quien Caiga, Fútbol para todos, Morfi, todos a la mesa, Como ring al finger, among others. She lived for several years in Naples, Italy, where she managed various Maradona businesses. In 2003, she produced the play "Pijamas" with Fabián Gianola, Mario Pasik, Victoria Onetto, Anita Martínez, Luciana Salazar and Jorge Taiana. In 2005, she participated in Diego Maradona's program, La Noche del 10, on El Trece. In 2008, she participated in the tribute documentary Maradona by Kusturica by Serbian filmmaker Emir Kusturica based on the life of Maradona.

In 2020, she was part of the group of contestants on the television program MasterChef Celebrity Argentina, where she became the winner of said reality show.

== Controversies ==
In 2015, Maradona sued Villafañe for alleged fraud, fraud and embezzlement. Due to the popularity of the Maradona v. Villafañe case and the development of its investigations in other countries, various Argentine and foreign media covered the issue. In July 2020, after a court ruling, the dismissal of said case against her ex-husband was revoked.

In 2020, the series Maradona: Blessed Dream was being made, where her character was played by actresses Laura Natalia Esquivel (as Claudia when she was young) and Julieta Cardinali (in her adult life). On that occasion, Villafañe provided a series of notes to say that she had sent a document letter to the producers of the series, Amazon Prime Video and BTF Media, because they did not ask her or her family for permission to use their identities.
