= Giuseppe Schirò (poet) =

Arbëreshë writer (1865–1927)

- Zef Skiroi
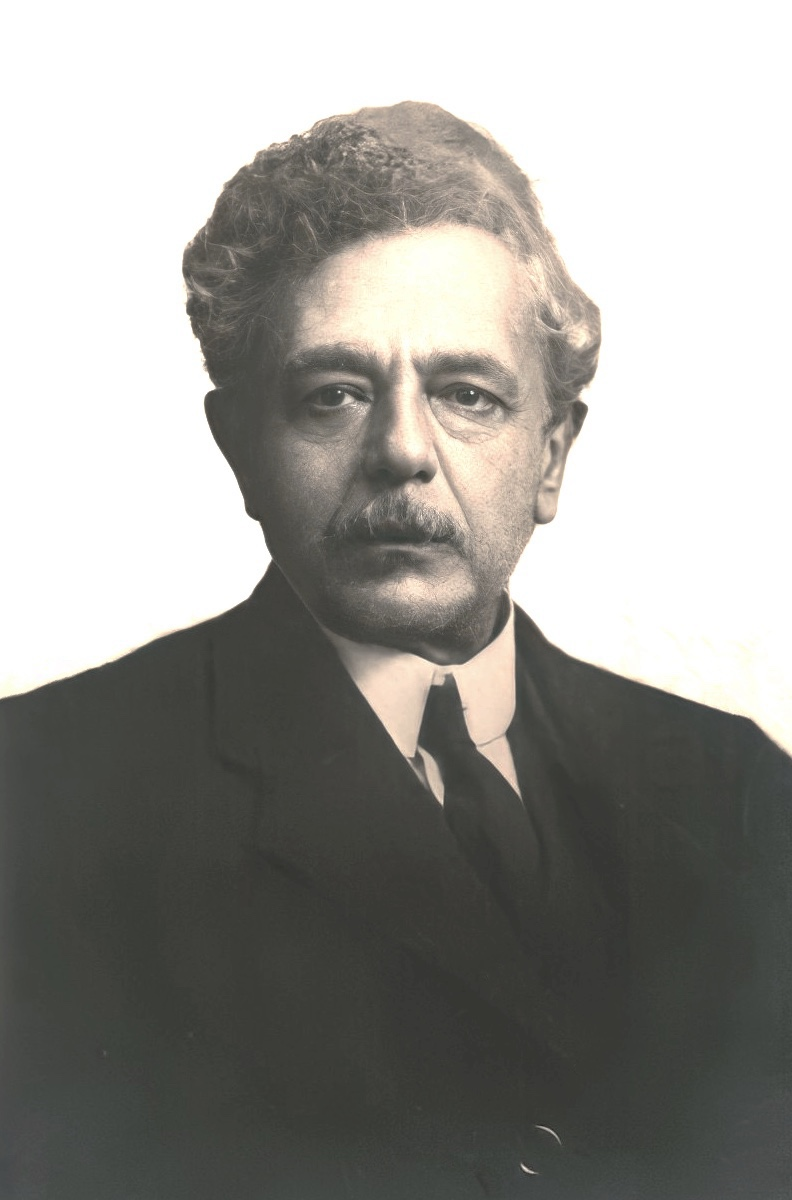
- Born: 10 August 1865; Piana degli Albanesi, Italy
- Died: 17 February 1927 (aged 61); Naples, Italy
- Occupations: Poet, linguist, publicist and folklorist

Giuseppe Schirò (Arbërisht: Zef Skiroi; 10 August 1865 – 17 February 1927) was an Italian neo-classical poet, linguist, publicist and folklorist of Arbëresh descent. His literary work marked the transition from the Arbëresh language to modern Albanian literature in Italy. He was a major protagonist of the Rilindja, the Albanian cultural awakening or Albanian Renaissance, in Italy.

== Early life ==
Schirò was born in Piana dei Greci (now Piana degli Albanesi). While still young he was encouraged by his cousin Cristina Gentile Mandalà (1856–1919) to value his native Arbëreshë language and culture. She would assist him later in collecting local folktales and published a compilation of folktales herself. At the age of nine he wrote a poem inspired by nationalism and dedicated to Albania's most important national hero Skanderbeg.

In 1890, he graduated with a law degree at the University of Palermo. However, his main passion remained classical and Italian folklore and literature, which he taught in 1888–1894 at the Garibaldi secondary school in Palermo. At the university he befriended Luigi Pirandello, who would become a world-famous novelist and playwright.

== Literary career ==
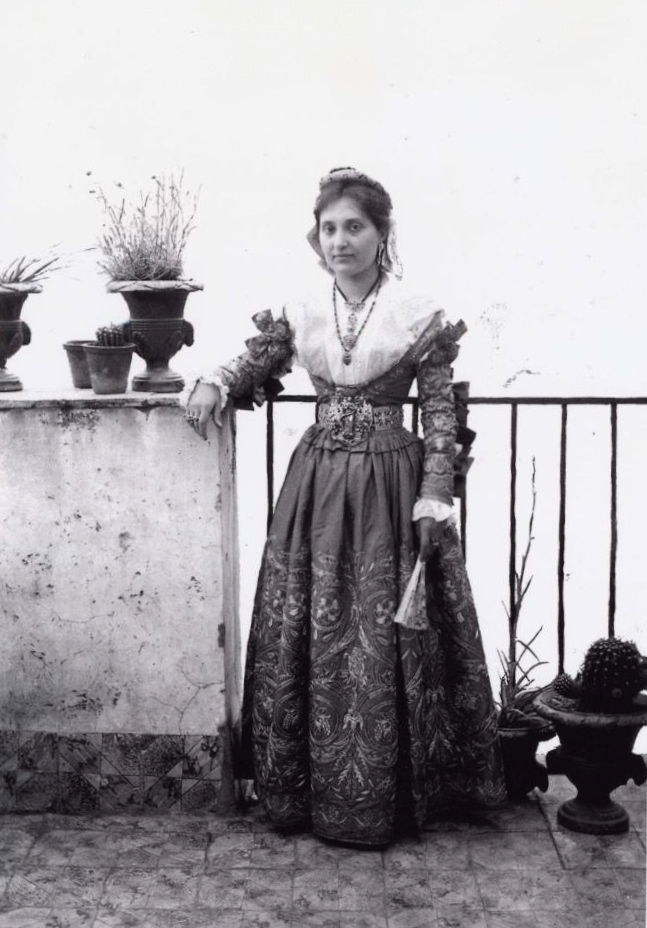
The novelist Cristina Mandalà (1856 – 1919) at the College of Maria, cousin and first teacher of Schirò

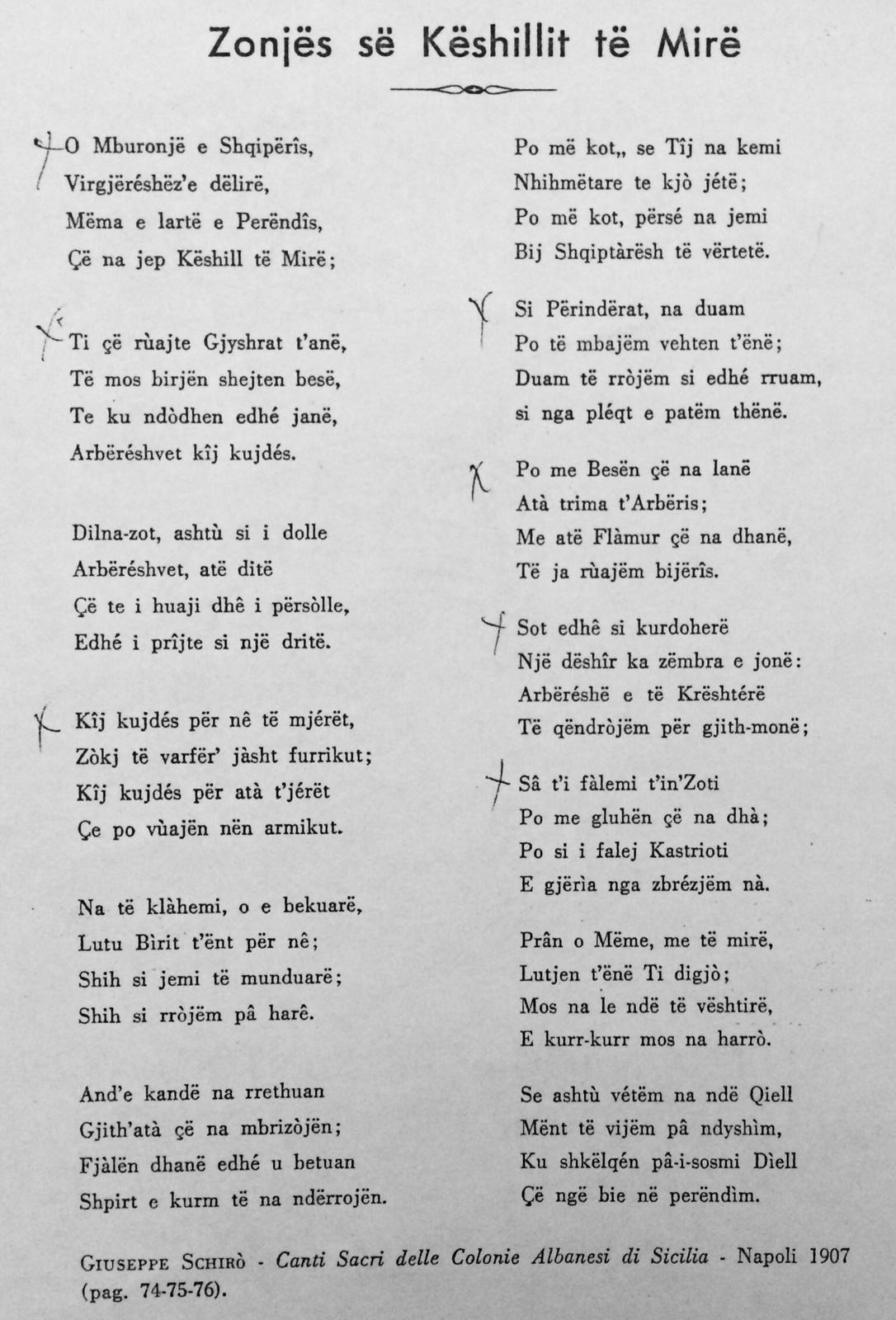
The hymn "O mburonjë e Shqipërisë" (O protector of Albania), collected in Canti Tradizionali ed altri Saggi delle Colonie Albanesi di Sicilia (1907)

He wrote poems in both Italian and Albanian, and soon began to collaborate with literary and political writings in various periodicals. In 1887, he founded the magazine Arbri i rii (La giovine Albania/The young Albania), which was followed in 1890 with Archivio albanese (Albanian archive) and in 1904 with the short-lived La bandiera albanese (The Albanian flag).

His literary breakthrough was Rapsodie albanesi (Albanian Rhapsodies) in 1887, which made him known to Albanologists and Albanian patriots. In 1891, he published an imaginary love idyll Mili e Haidhia (Mili and Haidhia), which would eventually be published in three editions (1900 and 1907), including notes on traditions, legends, customs and traditions of Piana dei Greci. The work is considered to be a masterpiece of early 20th century Albanian verse and is probably his best work.

A collection of patriotic songs Kënkat e luftës (The songs of battle), dedicated to Albanian independence, came out in Palermo in 1897, followed by the historical idyll Te dheu i huaj (To the foreign land) in 1900 about the epic escape of Albanians in the 15th century from their homeland and their arrival in Sicily. He also published work on Arbëreshë folklore in Canti sacri delle colonie albanesi di Sicilia (Sacred Songs of the Albanian Colonies in Sicily) in 1907, and Canti tradizionali e altri saggi delle colonie albanesi di Sicilia (Traditional Songs and Other Essays of the Albanian colonies of Sicily) in 1923.

== Academic career and politics ==
Schirò was a major protagonist of the Rilindja, the Albanian cultural awakening or Albanian Renaissance, in Italy. In October 1895, along with fellow Italo-Albanians Girolamo de Rada and Anselmo Lorecchio, he organised a congress on Albanian national, cultural and linguistic self-determination that convened in Corigliano Calabro and it was followed by a second congress in Lungro during February 1897. Schirò's views on the Albanian question during the late Ottoman period were in support of revolution against the empire so as to take advantage of sympathy toward Albanians in the European press and influence European diplomacy toward supporting an uprising. For Schirò, the existence of the Ottoman Empire was on borrowed time and he was against Albanian-Ottoman cooperation to safeguard Albanian interests as for him it was counterproductive to achieving Albanian independence.

In 1900 he was appointed professor of Albanian language and literature at the Istituto Regio Orientale (Royal Oriental Institute) in Naples, where he would remain until the end of his life. From 1912 to 1914 Schirò worked in Albania as an inspector for Italian schools. Those were the years of the birth of an independent Albania, proclaimed in November 1912 after nearly 500 years of Ottoman rule.

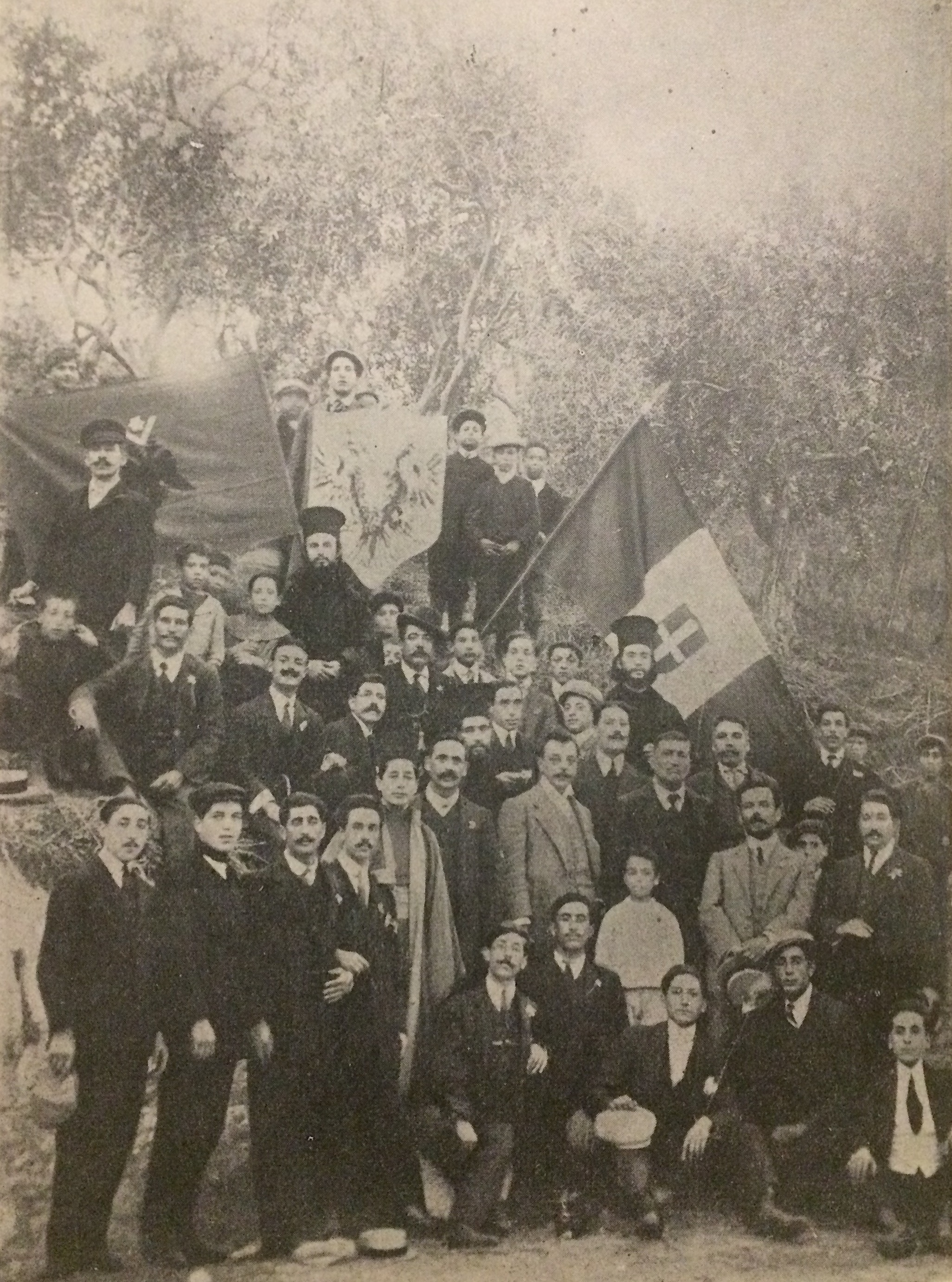
«Pro Albania» demonstration in Piana degli Albanesi in 1911 (in the center the poet)

Meanwhile, he had laid the foundation of the Società nazionale albanese (Albanian National Society) to affect public opinion in favour for the independence of Albania, and for the same purpose composed a poem Fiamuri i Arbërit (The Albanian flag) and the book "The Albanians and the Balkan question", both in 1904. While devotedly Albanian, Schirò also admired Italy's cultural potential. He often advocated Italy's role, with its strong Arbëreshë minority, as a protector of the weak Albanian state against the hostile intentions of its Balkan neighbours. In 1913, Schirò participated in the Albanian Congress of Trieste for recognition of the political and economic independence of Albania.

Schirò was fascinated with the early Fascist movement of Benito Mussolini. In Kënkat e litorit (The Songs of the Littoral), published in 1926, he glorified the rise of the movement. In local politics, he was an unyielding opponent of Nicola Barbato, the socialist leader of his hometown Piana dei Greci. He supported the local Mafia boss Francesco Cuccia for mayor in April 1922. Schirò publicly defended the Mafia administration of Cuccia several times, considering it "the most suitable for the peaceful development of the best qualities of its people," able to open "a new period in our history." In a speech from the balcony of City Hall, he praised Cuccia to have had the merit and the courage "to have done away with that red flag of socialism from our community."

== Death and legacy ==
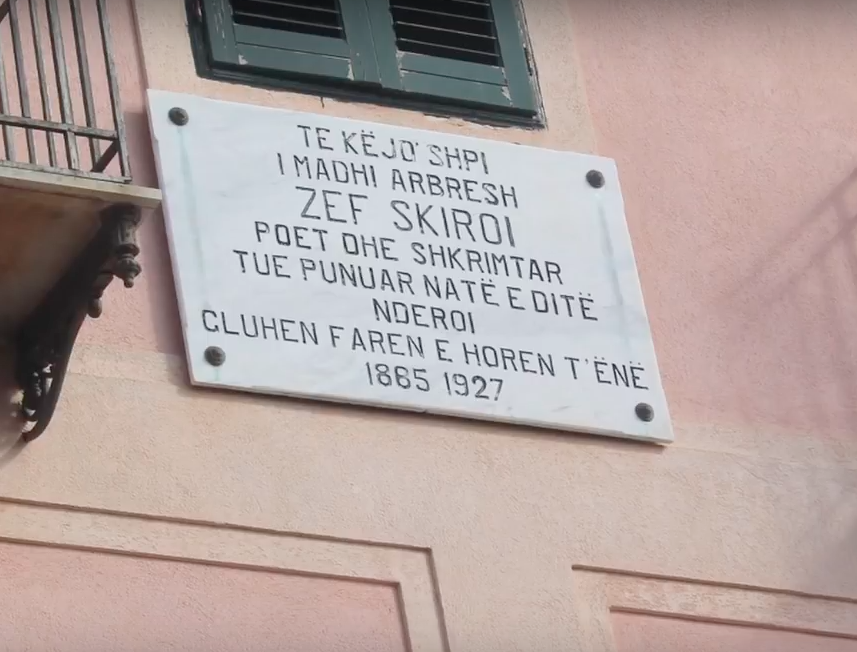
Marble plaque placed on the house of the Italo-Albanian poet

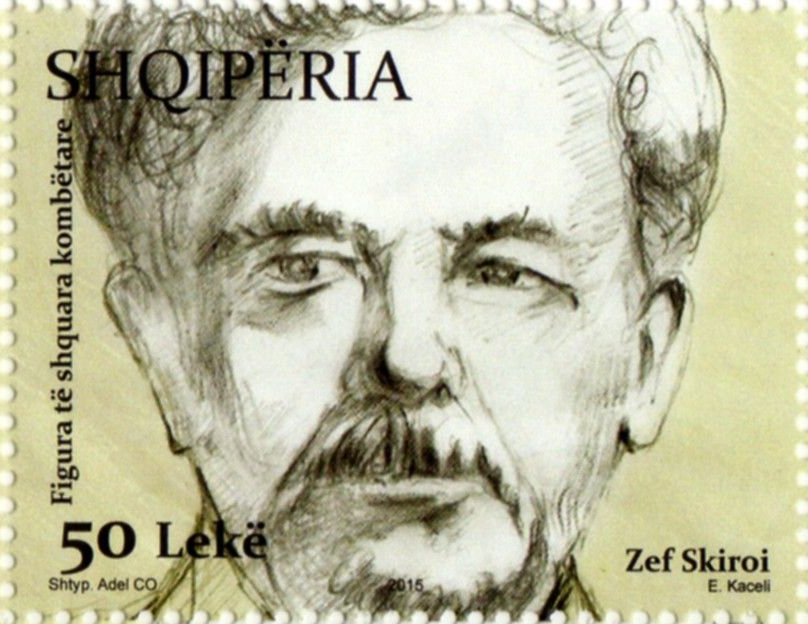
Schirò on a 2015 stamp of Albania

The death of his son Mino, murdered in a political intrigue in July 1920, cast a heavy shadow over his final years. He dedicated the poem "Mino" to his son's death. Schirò died on 17 February 1927 in Naples.

His absolute belief in fascist Italy as a potential protector and custodian of the culture of Albania conflicted with the aspirations of Albanian nationalists, which advocated absolute independence, including from Italy. Despite his accomplishments, Schirò was less appreciated by literary historians in Communist Albania and political criteria interfered with objective literary criticism.

Schirò is considered to be one of the greatest figures of contemporary Sicilian Arbëresh literature. According to the scholar of Albanian literature and folklore Robert Elsie, Schirò "first succeeded in blending the romantic elements of Arbëresh folk verse with the artistic precision of Italian classical and neo-classical poetry to form a harmonious and balanced poetic corpus. What Girolamo De Rada had done for Arbëresh literature in the 19th century, Giuseppe Schirò accomplished in the 20th."

== Sources ==
- Elsie, Robert (2005). Albanian Literature: A Short History, I. B. Tauris, ISBN 1-84511-031-5
- Di Marco P. & Musco A. (2005). Aspetti della cultura bizantina ed albanese in Sicilia, Officina di Studi Medievali
