= Jakova =

Jakova is a surname. Notable people with the surname include:

- Tahir Efendi Gjakova (1770–1850/1835), Albanian bejtexhi
- Gaspër Jakova Mërturi (1870–1941), Albanian writer
- Halim Jakova-Gostivari (1878–1927), Albanian politician, lawyer and public official
- Ludovik Jakova (1912–1988), Albanian footballer and coach
- Tuk Jakova (1914–1959), Albanian politician
- Prenk Jakova (1917–1969), Albanian composer, musician, and author

== See also ==
- Jakova, former Albanian name of Gjakovë, city and municipality in western Kosovo
