= Muñeca Brava =

- Created by: Enrique Oscar Torres
- Written by: Enrique Oscar Torres
- Directed by: Hernán Abrahamnsohn; Gaita Aragona; Víctor Stella
- Starring: Natalia Oreiro; Facundo Arana; Fernanda Mistral; Verónica Vieyra; Lydia Lamaison; Victoria Onetto; Norberto Díaz
- Theme music composer: Pablo Durand; Fernando López Rossi
- Opening theme: Cambio Dolor by Natalia Oreiro
- Ending theme: Cambio Dolor by Natalia Oreiro
- Country of origin: Argentina
- Original language: Spanish
- No. of seasons: 1
- No. of episodes: 270

Production
- Executive producer: Susana Rudni
- Producer: Raúl Lecouna
- Production locations: Bariloche, Argentina; Buenos Aires, Argentina; Florence, Italy; Gualeguaychú, Entre Ríos, Argentina; Ibiza, Spain; Rome, Italy
- Cinematography: Hugo Battitessa
- Editor: Gabriel Simari
- Running time: 40-50 Minutes

Original release
- Network: Telefe
- Release: November 16, 1998 – December 17, 1999

Muñeca Brava (Wild Angel; lit. 'Rough Doll') is an Argentine telenovela, produced by Telefe in 1998–1999. The television series was broadcast in more than 80 countries over the world, enjoying high ratings.

The show was written by Enrique Oscar Torres and directed by Hernán Abrahamsohn, Gaita Aragona, and Víctor Stella. The first episode was aired in Argentina on 10 October 1998 on channel Telefe. The play was filmed mainly in Argentina (Buenos Aires). Though some of the episodes were filmed in Italy and Spain. The programme is known for launching the international career of Uruguayan actress Natalia Oreiro.

== Plot ==
The story revolves around Milagros and Ivo, two people who fall in love with each other in spite of the odds against them. It is a romantic comedy novela that also touches on issues of family, wealth, greed, deception, and most of all—love. Milagros was brought up in an orphanage when her mother died giving birth to her. She had no idea who her father was and spent all her years despising him for abandoning them.

She ends up becoming a house servant at the Di Carlo mansion when she turns 18, since she can no longer stay in the orphanage. In the mansion, she meets new friends, and people who treat her as family. But she also gains new foes, specifically Luisa Di Carlo ( Ivo's mother ) and Marta ( another servant ) who hate her for her tactless and feisty character, and also for her use of vulgar phrases. Angelica Di Carlo, Federico Di Carlo's mother, initially dislikes Milagros, but slowly falls in love with her lively character and her rejection of pretentious social norms, and regards her as her granddaughter. Later, it is revealed that Milagros is actually her granddaughter, which strengthens their bond even more. Most of all, she meets the love of her life, Ivo Di Carlo, the heir of the Di Carlo fortune. Theirs is a love-hate relationship, decorated with comedic antics they play on each other, and the passion of their true love.

Ivo Di Carlo is a playboy, immature, and boastful. He has had everything handed to him on a silver platter. But he lacks the love of a father, as Federico Di Carlo makes him feel unwanted. Milagros, on the other hand, is religious, playful, and has a strong character. Their relationship survives many challenges, including issues that root from their parents' deceptive acts, secret love affairs, greed, and ambition. As a playboy, Ivo also has several girls that go between him and Milagros, the most significant are Andrea, Florencia, and Pilar. Andrea, Federico's secretary, is shown to be a very vicious character, as she is constantly trying to sabotage the relationship between Milagros and Ivo, as she wants Ivo for herself. Milagros also has flings of her own, she forges relationships with Pablo and Sergio.

At some point, Milagros thinks that they are siblings, as Luisa Di Carlo gives Milagros a letter in which she reveals that Federico Di Carlo is her real father. However, it is also later revealed that Ivo is the son of Luisa Di Carlo's lover, Nestor Miranda. In the end, Ivo and Milagros survive the tests of their relationship and wed in front of the people they love.

== Cast ==
- Natalia Oreiro as Milagros 'Mili' Esposito-Di Carlo de Miranda
- Facundo Arana as Ivo Miranda Rapallo
- Fernanda Mistral as Luisa Rapallo de Di Carlo
- Verónica Vieyra as Victoria 'Vicky' Di Carlo Rapallo
- Lydia Lamaison as Doña Angélica viuda de Di Carlo
- Victoria Onetto as Adelina 'Lina' de Solo
- Norberto Díaz as Damián Rapallo
- Mariana Arias as Andrea Ramos
- Silvia Baylé as Socorro 'Amparo' Rodríguez García
- Segundo Cernadas as Pablo Rapallo
- Osvaldo Guidi as Bernardo Avelleyra
- Valeria Lorca as Martha 'Martita' Rodriguez de Avelleyra
- Gabriela Sari as Gloria Esposito
- Pablo Novak as Alfredo'Bobby' de Solo
- Gino Renni as Ramón García Parapuchino
- Marcelo Mazzarello as Morgan / Rocky
- Arturo Maly as Federico Di Carlo
- Sebastián Miranda as Carlos / Chamuco
- Humberto Serrano as Father Manuel Miranda
- Luis Mottola as Luis
- Brian Caruso as Gamuza
- Paola Krum as Florencia Rizzo Miranda de Rapallo
- Paula Sierro as Marina Rizzo Rapallo
- Florencia Ortiz as Pilar
- Diego Ramos as Sergio Costa
- Rodolfo Machado as Nestor Miranda
- Ana Maria Caso as Mother Superior
- Emilio Bardi as Francisco
- Marita Ballesteros as Rosario Albertini

== Music ==
=== Natalia Oreiro ===
- Cambio dolor or Cambio Dolor (Pumpin' Dolls Pool Party Club Mix)
- Me muero de amor
- Vengo del mar
- De tu Amor or De Tu Amor (Pumpin' Dolls Fashion Club Mix)
- Uruguay
- Se pego en mi piel
- Sabrosito y dulzon
- Y te vas conmigo
- Fuiste original singing by Gilda, performance in Muñeca brava performed Oreiro
- Nada mas que hablar
- Que si que si or Que Si, Que Si (Little Corp Mix)

=== Rafaga ===
Rafaga performed by mostly at the disco party

- La Luna y Tu
- Maldito corazon
- Mentirosa

=== Other musicians ===
- Mama by Spice Girls
- Quien Será by Daniel Agostini
- Y quisiera by Ella baila sola
- A fuego lento by Rosana
- Penelope by Diego Torres
- Cuanto Amor Me Das by Eros Ramazzotti
- Nunca Te Decides (Que Si, Que No) by El Simbolo
- Te Perdi by Chris Duran
- Desesperadamente Enamorado by Jordi
- Nunca Te Olvidaré by Enrique Iglesias
- Cómo Te Voy a Olvidar by Los Ángeles Azules
- Corazón partío by Alejandro Sanz
- Se Me Antoja by Francisco Céspedes
- Bésame Mucho by Luis Miguel
- Pienso en tí by Chayanne
- Olvidarte by Ricardo Arjona
- Decir adiós by Carlos Ponce
- Dónde van by Diego Torres
- Como un Ángel by Fabrizio Casalino
- Mira Para Arriba by Lalo Fransen
- Hey Now Now by Swirl 360

== Remakes ==
- Portugal – Anjo Selvagem (2001–2003)
- India – Miilee (2005–2006)
- Mexico – Al diablo con los guapos (2007–2008)
- Indonesia – Hafizah (2009–2010)
- Peru – La Tayson, corazón rebelde (2012)
