= Girolamo de Rada =

Arbëreshë poet, writer, and prominent figure in the Albanian Renaissance

- Jeronim de Rada
- Girolamo de Rada
- Born: 19 November 1814; Macchia Albanese, Kingdom of Bourbon-Two Sicilies
- Died: 28 February 1903 (aged 88)
- Education: University of Naples
- Occupations: Folklorist; journalist; lawyer; playwright; poet; rilindas; writer
- Writing career
- Language: Albanian; Ancient Greek; Italian
- Genre: Romanticism
- Movement: Albanian Renaissance

Girolamo de Rada (Arbërisht: Jeronim de Rada; 29 November 1814 – 28 February 1903) was an Arbëreshë folklorist, journalist, lawyer, playwright, poet, rilindas and writer. He is regarded as one of the most influential Albanian writers of the 19th century who played an essential role in the Albanian Renaissance.

== Biography ==
=== Life ===
His ancestors are believed to have migrated from Dibër County. Born the son of a parish priest of Italo-Albanian Catholic Church in Macchia Albanese in the mountains of Cosenza, Calabria, De Rada attended the college of Saint Adrian in San Demetrio Corone. Already imbued with a passion for his Albanian lineage, he began collecting folklore material at an early age.

== Career ==
=== Literature ===
In October 1834, in accordance with his father's wishes, he registered at the Faculty of Law of the University of Naples, but the main focus of his interests remained folklore and literature. It was in Naples in 1836 that De Rada published the first edition of his best known Albanian-language poem, the "Songs of Milosao", under the Italian title Poesie albanesi del secolo XV. Canti di Milosao, figlio del despota di Scutari (Albanian poetry from the 15th century. Songs of Milosao, son of the despot of Shkodra). He was soon forced to abandon his studies due to a cholera epidemic in Naples and returned home to Calabria.

His second work, Canti storici albanesi di Serafina Thopia, moglie del principe Nicola Ducagino, Naples 1839 (Albanian historical songs of Serafina Thopia, wife of prince Nicholas Dukagjini), was seized by the Bourbon authorities because of De Rada's alleged affiliation with conspiratorial groups during the Italian Risorgimento. The work was republished under the title Canti di Serafina Thopia, principessa di Zadrina nel secolo XV, Naples 1843 (Songs of Serafina Thopia, princess of Zadrina in the 15th century) and in later years in a third version as Specchio di umano transito, vita di Serafina Thopia, Principessa di Ducagino, Naples 1897 (Mirror of human transience, life of Serafina Thopia, princess of Dukagjin). His Italian-language historical tragedy I Numidi, Naples 1846 (The Numidians), elaborated half a century later as Sofonisba, dramma storico, Naples 1892 (Sofonisba, historical drama), enjoyed only modest public response. In the revolutionary year 1848, De Rada founded the newspaper L'Albanese d'Italia (The Albanian of Italy) which included articles in Albanian. This bilingual "political, moral and literary journal" with a final circulation of 3,200 copies was the first Albanian-language periodical anywhere.

Before Albania had become a political entity, it had already become a poetic reality in the works of Geronimo De Rada. His vision of an independent Albania grew in the second half of the nineteenth century from a simple desire to a realistic political objective to which he was passionately committed.

De Rada was the pioneering voice in the Romantic movement in Albanian literature. This movement was inspired by his unfailing energy on behalf of national awakening among Albanians in Italy and in the Balkans. Thus evolving into the romantic nationalism characteristic of the Rilindja period in Albania. His journalistic, literary and political activities were instrumental in fostering an awareness for the Arbëresh minority in Italy and laying the foundations for an Albanian national literature.

The most popular of his literary works is the above-mentioned Canti di Milosao (Songs of Milosao), known in Albanian as Këngët e Milosaos, a long romantic ballad portraying the love of Milosao, a fictitious young nobleman in fifteenth-century Shkodra (Scutari), who has returned home from Thessalonica. Here, at the village fountain, he encounters and falls in love with Rina, the daughter of the shepherd Kollogre. The difference in social standing between the lovers long impedes their union until an earthquake destroys both the city and all semblance of class distinction. After their marriage abroad, a child is born. But the period of marital bliss does not last long. Milosao's son and wife soon die, and he himself, wounded in battle, perishes on a riverbank within sight of Shkodra.

De Rada also published the magazine Fiamuri Arbërit, whose first issue appeared on 20 July 1883 in Cosenza, Italy initially in Albanian in a Latin-based alphabet invented by de Rada, and later with translations in Italian. The journal, featuring subjects regarding Albanian literature, politics and history, quickly became popular among Albanians and was widely distributed.

=== Politics ===
Girolamo de Rada on a 2023 stamp of Albania

In 1881, De Rada's views on Albania's future envisaged a country split into three units based on religion within a federal state. By 1886, De Rada opposed proposals by the Greeks of a Balkan federation and supported remaining separate from Greece as any unification according to him would entail the end of Albanian existence. De Rada maintained a policy of siding with the Ottomans against common enemies and disapproving of anti-Ottoman insurrection viewing it as Greek and Serb foreign influence with the hope that the Ottoman Empire would grant Albanians their socio-political rights.

In October 1895, De Rada, along with fellow Italo-Albanians Giuseppe Schirò and Anselmo Lorecchio, organised a congress on Albanian national, cultural and linguistic self-determination that convened in Corigliano Calabro. It was followed by a second congress in Lungro during February 1897.

== See also ==
- List of Albanian writers
- Albanians in Italy
- La Nazione Albanese
