= Swirl 360 =

American alternative pop duo

- Origin: Jacksonville Beach, Florida, U.S.
- Genres: Alternative pop
- Years active: 1996–present
- Labels: Mercury; Atenzia Records
- Members: Denny Scott; Kenny Scott

Swirl 360 is an alternative pop band founded by twins Denny and Kenny Scott.

== Biography ==
In 1996, twin brothers Denny and Kenny Scott, formerly called Fools of Faith and before that Dream in Color, recorded a set of demos in Jacksonville Beach, Fla. The Scott Brothers brought these recordings to Austin's SXSW (South by Southwest) music conference, where they met Los Angeles-based music attorney Christopher Sabec, who at that time managed Hanson and Dave Matthews.

Sabec signed the duo, re-christened Swirl 360 (to avoid confusion with a same-named Australian band), to Mercury. The resulting debut, Ask Anybody, was released in mid-1998, and the track "Hey, Now Now," co-written with John Shanks, became a top 5 hit on radio airwaves worldwide. Rolling Stone gave the album 3.5 stars and other entertainment magazines reviewed the band's efforts favorably. The band's second single "Candy In The Sun" released in 1999, was a summer chart topper as well. "Candy In The Sun" was also featured on the soundtrack to the film Never Been Kissed. The star of Never Been Kissed, Drew Barrymore even appeared in the music video for the song.

Despite this early success, album sales failed to meet expectations due to the late 1990s merger of Polygram (the parent label of Mercury) with Universal Music Group, resulting in Mercury Records dissolving into Island Def Jam Records. Many staff working with the band were laid off during this deal. Universal cut off funding for the album's promotion, and the band was released from its contract.

The Scott brothers continued developing material in the hope of securing another contract. Two songs, "Okay" and "Radio Song," are featured in the movie National Lampoon's Van Wilder starring Ryan Reynolds but still the act failed to break through. Discouraged, the brothers found themselves on the verge of quitting the music business altogether, and the subsequent tension led to a brief estrangement.

Atenzia Records unexpectedly approached the duo with offers in early 2003; the first album under the contract was recorded over a two-month period at record producer Evan Frankfort's Lake Arrowhead studio. Here the band was rounded out by Chad Salls (former bassist for Color) and Luke Adams (touring drummer for Pete Yorn); notable guest musicians contributed to the album, including Roger Joseph Manning, Jr. (Jellyfish, Beck). Revitalized by the promising turn of events, the Scott brothers' positive outlook influenced the style and sound of the resulting material; despite this, and despite a number of reports that appeared in music news sources throughout 2004, Atenzia released the album, called California Blur, only in Europe.

Once again, while rough release dates for California Blur in the U.S. peppered entertainment news and fan discussions, nothing came of them.

=== Echo Jet ===
In August 2007, hoping to make a fresh start, the group renamed itself Echo Jet. Echo Jet went on to have a top 40 hit on HotAC in the summer of 2008 with the single "Wave." The band parted ways with the Atenzia in the fall of 2006 and continue to work behind the scenes as co-writers with other artist and in television and film. The 2008 movie Bedtime Stories, starring Adam Sandler, featured their song "One and Only." Baha Men, Click Five, O-Town, and Howard Jones have all covered songs by the Scott brothers.

In October 2010, the duo released a new EP titled 4, featuring four newly recorded tracks. They also released a compilation entitled "Echoes from the Past" which contained several demos and their works as Echo Jet, a best-of album, and a new single, "Rise Over," in March 2011. By this time, they were working with Alan Frew of Glass Tiger/Ole Publishing.

=== Rock Paper Pistols ===
In June 2013, Denny Scott moved back to Jacksonville to form a new act, Rock Paper Pistols, releasing an EP entitled, Love Sick Symphonies Pt. 1. He also released the song "Do You Want Some Football?" written for the Jacksonville Jaguars NFL team.

Brother Kenny Scott lived in St. Pete Beach, FL, with his daughter Josephine Scott, where he operates the 18 Below recording studio until 2018. Kenny moved to Safety Harbor, FL and continues to make music under the 18 Below moniker.

== Members ==
- Denny Scott - Vocals, guitar
- Kenny Scott - Guitar, programming, backing vocals
- Chad Salls - Bass, backing vocals
- Luke Adams - Drums, backing vocals

== Discography ==
=== Albums ===
- Ask Anybody (1998)
- California Blur (2004)
- Echoes From The Past (2010)
- 4 (2010)
- Best & B-sides (2010)
- Love Sick Symphonies Pt. I (2014) (as Denny Scott's Rock Paper Pistols)
- Five (2019)

=== Extended plays ===
- EP (2002)

=== Singles ===
- "Hey Now Now" (1998)
- "Candy in the Sun" (1998)
- "Wave" (2008) (as Echo Jet)
- "Presence of Angels" (2010)
- "Breathe" (2010)
- "Rise Over" (2011)
- "Hurry Up Summer" (2019)

=== Soundtrack appearances ===
- Dawson's Creek S2E07 The All Nighters (1998) ("Candy In The Sun")
- I Still Know What You Did Last Summer (1998) ("Hey Now Now")
- Jack Frost (1998) ("Hey Now Now")
- Never Been Kissed (1999) ("Candy in the Sun")
- Muñeca Brava (1999) ("Hey Now Now")
- Our Lips Are Sealed (2001) ("Hey Now Now")
- National Lampoon's Van Wilder (2002) ("Radio Song," "Okay")
- Wildfire (2005) ("Runway")
- Bedtime Stories (2008) ("One & Only")
- Melrose Place
