= La Nazione Albanese =

Albanian-language newspaper (1897–1924)

- Shkiperia Avanti! (Forward Albania!)
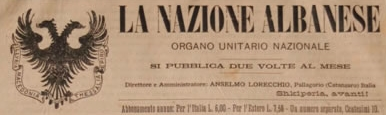
- Type: Bimonthly
- Founder: Anselmo Lorecchio
- Publisher: Albanian National Society 1897–1900; Albanian National Committee 1900–1924
- Managing editor: Anselmo Lorecchio
- Founded: 15 January 1897
- Ceased publication: March 1924
- Political alignment: Albanian National Cause; Arbereshe Intellectual Movement
- Language: Italian, Arbereshe, Albanian
- City: Pallagorio (Catanzaro) 1897–1900; Rome 1900–1924
- Country: Italy
- OCLC number: 235868818

La Nazione Albanese ("The Albanian Nation") was a newspaper of the Arbereshe community of Italy during end of 19th-century and early 20th-century. It covered political, socio-cultural, and informative functions toward the Arbereshe community and Albanians in general. It also covered thematics such as the Albanian National Awakening and state-forming, Italian-Albanian relationships, as well as political events of a broader spectrum. It was founded and managed by Italian lawyer and publicist Anselmo Lorecchio, an Arbereshe from Pallagorio, Calabria. It published articles from Albanian writers and publicists as well.

== History ==
The Società Nazionale Albanese (Albanian National Society) was founded in 1895 out of an Arberesh congress held in Corigliano Calabro and led by scholar Girolamo De Rada. Lorecchio would become head of the society in February 1897, during the second congress held in Lungro. Just a few weeks before La Nazione Albanese had already started publishing and served from that moment on as a press organ of the society, although its official newspaper remained Ylli i Arbëreshëve ("The star of the Arbereshe") published in Corigliano Calabro.

On 18 April 1900, the Società Nazionale Albanese transformed into Comitato Nazionale Albanese (Albanian National Committee) and the headquarters were transferred to Rome. The newspaper moved as well and was published there since then, printed in "Tipografia Dante Alighieri".
The death of Lorecchio in 1924 brought the newspaper as well to an end.

== Importance ==
The newspaper came in a particularly delicate moment for Albania and the wider political equilibrium of Europe in that period. Especially the Albanian issue, which served as battlefield of imperialistic interests of Italy and Austro-Hungary. The political essence of Lorecchio's work came into action specifically in this context: it managed to transmit clear and explicit political values to the Arbëreshë Intellectual Movement, and the newspaper that he founded and directed served as the main instrument for translating the cultural aspirations into a political project.

— Antonio D'Alessandri, Roma Tre University
