= Dalma Maradona =

Argentine actress

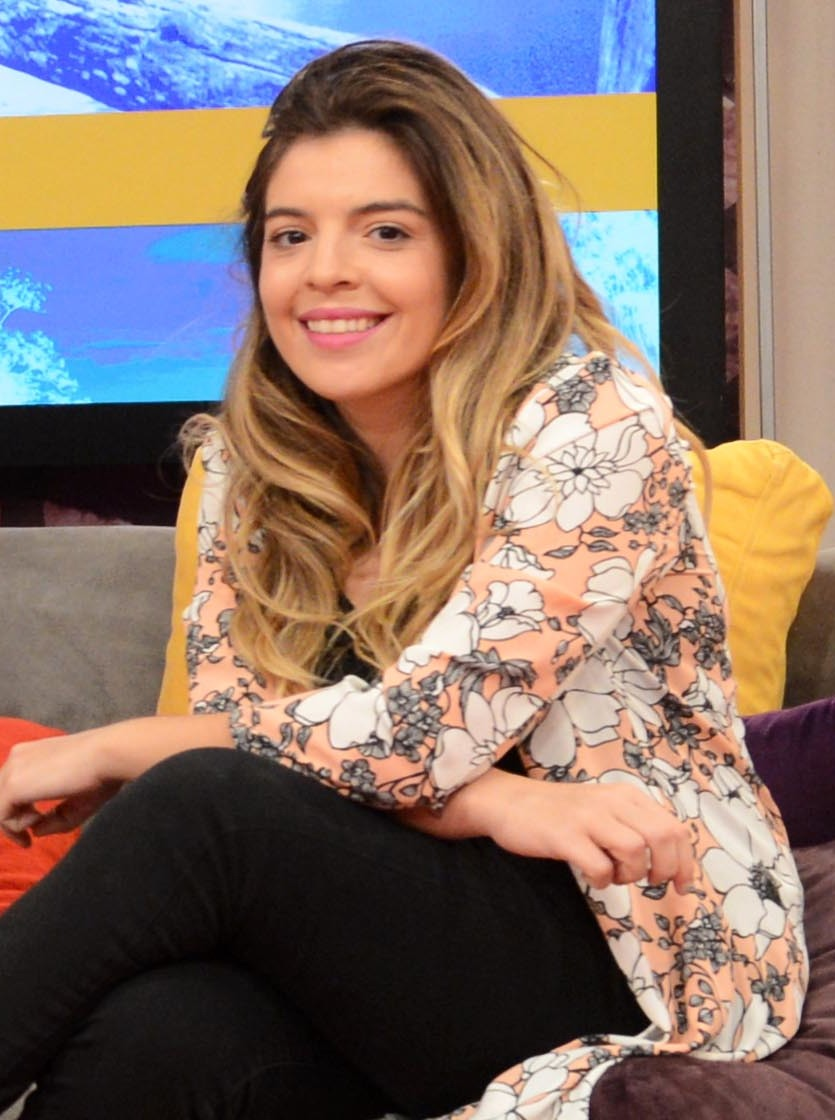
- Maradona in 2014
- Born: Dalma Nerea Maradona; 2 April 1987 (age 39); Buenos Aires, Argentina
- Occupation: Actress
- Spouse: Andrés Caldarelli (m. 2018)
- Children: 2
- Parent(s): Diego Maradona; Claudia Villafañe

Dalma Nerea Maradona (born 2 April 1987) is an Argentine actress.

== Biography ==
Dalma Maradona was born 2 April 1987 at Clínica del Sol in Buenos Aires, the daughter of Claudia Villafañe and Diego Maradona. Her paternal grandfather Diego Maradona "Chitoro" (1927–2015), who worked at a chemicals factory, was of Guaraní (Indigenous) and Spanish (Basque) descent, and her paternal grandmother Dalma Salvadora Franco, "Doña Tota" (1929–2011), was of Italian and Croatian descent.

Her father played for football club S.S.C. Napoli in Naples, Italy. She also lived for some time in the Spanish city of Seville for the same reason. At the age of six, she returned to Buenos Aires to live with her grandmother, since she did not feel comfortable in Spain.

She began her training in acting at the school of Hugo Midón. After an exhaustive selection, she managed to be one of the hundred applicants to enter the University Institute of Art (IUNA), receiving a Bachelor of Acting in 2011. She went to Saint Edward's College, in the city of Vicente López. Dalma maintained a sentimental relationship with Fernando Molina for more than 8 years. In 2011, she separated from Molina, abruptly, due to an alleged infidelity.

On 31 March 2018, after five years of dating, Dalma married Andrés Caldarelli. On 12 March 2019, the first daughter from their marriage, whom they called Roma, was born in Buenos Aires. She gave birth to her second daughter, Azul, in July 2022.

== Career ==
Dalma began her career in 1997, at the age of nine, in the children's television series Cebollitas, which told the story of a group of child football players at a neighborhood club where she played the role of Sofía. In 2003, she recorded scenes for a chapter of the TV series "Hospital Público" that aired on América TV playing the role of a pregnant teenager who arrives at a hospital guard with contractions.

Later, in 2005, she made her theater debut with the children's play "Little Red Riding Hood and the Wolf" at the Broadway Theatre on Avenida Corrientes. In 2008, she made her film debut in the film La Rabia, directed by Albertina Carri.
