= Elsa Serrano =

Italian-born Argentine fashion designer (1941–2020)

- Born: Elsa Romio; 13 July 1941; Corigliano Calabro, Calabria, Italy
- Died: 16 September 2020 (aged 79); Buenos Aires, Argentina
- Occupation: Fashion designer
- Spouse: Alfredo Serrano
- Children: 3

Elsa Romio de Serrano (13 July 1941-16 September 2020), commonly known as Elsa Serrano, was an Italian-born Argentine fashion designer.

== Biography ==
Serrano was born as Elsa Romio in Corigliano Calabro, province of Cosenza, Calabria, Italy on 13 July 1941, the daughter of Checchina Malavolta and Espedito Romio. At the age of fourteen, Romio arrived in Argentina on 7 December 1955 with her parents and nine siblings.

Self-taught, Serrano did not carry out formal design studies; she started in fashion with a boutique that offered imported garments in the Belgrano neighborhood. In 1968, she began to design using her own style; for several years she designed four collections per season, haute couture and ready-to-wear. She later devoted herself exclusively to haute couture. In 1977, she organized the first show in her collection.

In forty-five years of experience, Serrano's designs were used by several well-known people, highlighting the wedding dress of Claudia Villafañe who was the wife of Diego Maradona. She also dressed important figures of Argentine cinema, such as Mirtha Legrand, Susana Giménez and Norma Aleandro, and foreigners such as Sophia Loren, Joan Collins, Gina Lollobrigida, Catherine Deneuve and dancer Maya Plisetskaya. Serrano had also dressed figures of Argentine politics, such as Zulemita, the daughter of former Argentine president Carlos Menem with whom she traveled in the tours abroad accompanying her father when he was president, and María Lorenza Barreneche, the wife of former Argentine president Raúl Alfonsín.

Serrano had a period of economic difficulties in 2001, coinciding with the December 2001 riots in Argentina, which forced her to close the doors of her company and finish off a home she owned located on Calle Mansilla, in Barrio Norte, but managed to recover. In 2020, she made her last television appearance as a jury in the program Corte y confección hosted by Andrea Politti.

== Awards ==
Serrano has won several times the Silver Scissors award given by the Argentine Chamber of Fashion. In 2014, she received special recognition for her career in local fashion.

== Death ==
Serrano died on 16 September 2020 at the age of seventy-nine due to a fire generated in her home located on the third floor of Calle 986 Maipú in the Retiro neighborhood of Buenos Aires. The autopsy determined that the cause of her death was asphyxia due to smoke inhalation and the investigations of the fire department expert team determined that the accident was caused by an electrical short circuit.

== Personal life ==
Serrano was married twice and from her second marriage, she adopted the surname Serrano for her professional life. She was survived by three daughters, Roxana, María Soledad and María Belén and six grandchildren.
