= Cambio Dolor =

Single by Natalia Oreiro

from the album Natalia Oreiro
- English title: "I Trade Pain"
- Released: September 10, 1998
- Recorded: 1998
- Genre: Latin pop
- Length: 4:05
- Label: Sony BMG Ariola Argentina
- Songwriters: Fernando López Rossi; Pablo Durand
- Producer: Pablo Durand

Natalia Oreiro singles chronology
"De Tu Amor" (1998)	"Cambio Dolor" (1998)	"Me Muero De Amor" (1999)

Music video
- "Cambio Dolor" on YouTube

"Cambio Dolor" (English: "I Trade Pain") is a 1998 song by Uruguayan singer Natalia Oreiro, the song was written by Pablo Durand and Fernando López Rossi, "Cambio Dolor" was released as the third single from Oreiro's self-titled debut studio album (1998). "Cambio Dolor" was the theme song of Argentine telenovela Muñeca Brava (Wild doll) with Natalia Oreiro as Milagros 'Mili' Esposito-Di Carlo de Miranda.

== Commercial performance ==
The song had great success throughout Latin America, Europe, and Asia thanks to it being the theme song to the telenovela Muñeca Brava which was a huge international hit at the time. This song was responsible for opening markets in different continents for the singer. The song is considered as one of the most successful telenovela themes to become a hit.

== Music video ==
A music video was released for the song with clips of it being used in the opening of the telenovela Muñeca Brava.

== Charts ==
Chart (1998-2000)	Peak position
Czech Republic (IFPI)	17
Poland Airplay (Music & Media)	5
Poland (Polish Airplay Charts)	5
Europe / World (Top 100 Singles)	10
