= Anselmo Lorecchio =

Italian lawyer, journalist, politician, poet, and writer

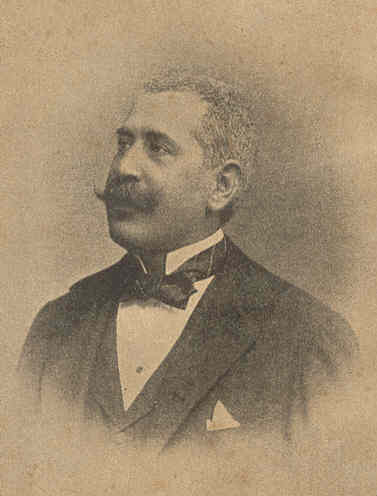
- Anselmo Lorecchio
- Born: November 3, 1843; Pallagorio, Kingdom of Naples
- Died: March 22, 1924 (aged 80); Rome, Kingdom of Italy
- Citizenship: Italian
- Known for: La Nazione Albanese newspaper (1897-1924)
- Notable work: The Albanian question. Various writings (1898); The Albanian political thought in relation to the Italian interest (1904)

Anselmo Lorecchio (Arbërisht: Anselmo Lorekio; November 3, 1843 – March 22, 1924) was an Italian lawyer, journalist, politician, poet and writer of Albanian descent, founder of the La Nazione Albanese newspaper, and author of several literary works in praise of the independence of Albania.

== Life ==
Anselmo Lorecchio was born on November 3, 1843, in Pallagorio, a small Arbëreshë town in Calabria, Italy, which he would keep strong ties with.

Obtained a degree in Law December 21, 1868, at the Royal University of Naples, became Prosecutor at the Court of Appeal of Naples in 1869, also worked at Banco di Napoli in 1870.

From 1878 he held various positions within the Italian public administration, including those of "Education executive" and "State property agent"; he also held other positions, this time of a political nature: he was secretary of the Provincial Council of Catanzaro 1883–1884, Mayor of Pallagorio in 1892 and delegated (or owner) of several enterprises in the administrative, economic, or judicial field. Lorecchio recruited Albanians from Ottoman Albania for new political publications and received their assistance such as in 1889 to publish The voice of Albania.

In 1895, based on an invitation published in the newspaper "The Morning" (Italian: Il Mattino), he participated in "The Congress of the Albanians of Italy" held in Corigliano Calabro, chaired by Girolamo de Rada, from were came out the Albanian National Society, where Lorecchio was elected vice president, De Rada as honorary chairman and Archimandrite Pietro Camodeca de’ Coronei as president. In January 1897, he founded the magazine "The Albanian Nation" (Italian: La Nazione Albanese), ideologically close to the Albanian National Cause.

In 1898, he published "The Albanian Question. Various writings" (Italian: La questione albanese. Scritti vari), a collection of articles from various newspapers locally and nationally as Il Calabro, La Giostra, Il Resto del Carlino, La Stampa, and many others.

On 8 April 1900 he founded in Rome on the Albanian National Committee (Italian: Società nazionale albanese), which ideologically filming the wake of the old Albanian National Society chaired by De Rada, Lorecchio and Camodeca de Coronei; this committee basically supposed adherence to all the initiatives that they were in favor of the independence of Albania, without ever having to resort to any act of violence.

In 1904 he published The Albanian political thought in relation to the interests of Italy, a book that he wrote in order to succeed in some way, in addition to tracking an initial budget of the early years of his magazine, to raise awareness of the Italian government and the general public on the importance of the Albanian question and the interests of Italy in the Adriatic and the Mediterranean. During June 1904, Lorecchio along with Gaspër Jakova Mërturi published an Italian language daily newspaper Agenzia Balcanica ed Italiana that focused on politics, finance and commercial information. Its aims were "to enlighten the European public opinion" about the rights and necessary reforms for the vilayets of Üsküb, Shkodër, Monastir, Yanina, and Salonica.

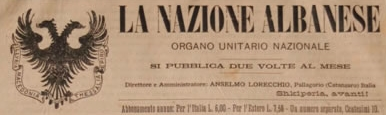
La Nazione Albanese front cover

Between 1900 and 1911, through the publication of several articles in "La Nazione Albanese", his voice was heard even more in favor of the nation so dear to him, Albania. He tried in those years to engage in his campaign several famous people, including Ricciotti Garibaldi and Juan Pedro Aladro Kastriota, Spanish nobleman descendant of Skanderbeg, as well as to gain the support of the Government on the increase in trade relations with the Albanian territories, even offering the mediation of the "Albanian National Society" to Foreign Minister Emilio Visconti Venosta.

In 1912, after a few days after the proclamation of independence of the Albanian state and the constitution of the government of Vlora, Ismail Qemali personally thanked Lorecchio saying, "Your wishes for the fulfillment of our common ideals come to us very welcome. We are sure of sympathy and warm support of all Albanians in Italy. Your work as an old fighter will be worthily appreciated by the free Albania."

In 1913, he was a delegate and participated at the Albanian Congress of Trieste (27 February – 6 March 1913), which prepared request to be sent to the Great Powers for recognition of the political and economical independence of the Albania, and established a treaty of friendship and support of the Aromanian populations that lived near Albanian-inhabited regions.

In the course of events related to the Great War, Lorecchio published in 1920 the volume "Albania: Memorandum for the independence of Albania" and, in 1921, the brochure "Albania is admitted to the League of Nations". The December 22, 1920, he received a letter from the head of the Albanian delegation to the "League of Nations", Fan S. Noli, in which he also thanked Lorecchio for his work.

Lorecchio died in Rome, at his home in St. John Lateran Square, on March 22, 1924; with his death, also the publications of the journal "La Nazione Albanese" ended.

"La Nazione Albanese" began to see the light in Pallagorio (Catanzaro), Italy in January 1897 with the motto "Forward Albania!", and continues to be published fortnightly, however, as it began. Supporter to all the bitter end, and without ever bargaining or retraction, of the national rights which avoided any foreign influence, it has become in a short time and since its first appearance what you say a popular newspaper; a "gym" where all Albanian writers found and are placed, screaming or making the novice, that the holy cause have made their ideal. It was as well, and is, the most designated target of wrath of all the enemies of the word "Albanian", always resisting the attacks, insults and all possible misfortunes. On the other hand it was able to acquire, for the loyalty and righteousness, numerous counts of sympathy and complete adherence to the program.

— Anselmo Lorecchio

== Works ==
- Abecedario of the Albanian language approved and adopted by the National Congress joined in Corigliano Calabro in October 1895, Corigliano Calabro, Popolano, 1896
- The Albanian question. Various writings, 1898
- The Albanian political thought in relation to the Italian interest, Rome, Tipografia operaia romana, 1904
- Albania: Memorandum for the independence of Albania, 1920

== Honours ==
- Knight of the Order of the Crown of Italy - proposal of the Italian Ministry of Interior, Rome, March 30, 1881
- Honorary citizen of the City of Verzino - ribbon for uniform ordinary Honorary Citizenship of the City of Verzino, Verzino, July 3, 1883
- Officer of the Order of the Crown of Italy - proposal of the Italian Ministry of Finance, Rome, August 7, 1891
