= An Argentinian in New York =

- Spanish: Un argentino en New York
- Directed by: Juan José Jusid
- Written by: Cristina Civale; Graciela Maglie
- Produced by: Carlos Mentasti; Heriberto Rivero Jr. Luis Scalella
- Starring: Guillermo Francella; Natalia Oreiro
- Cinematography: Juan Carlos Lenardi
- Music by: Federico Jusid
- Distributed by: Argentina Sono Film
- Release date: 21 May 1998
- Running time: 95 minutes
- Country: Argentina
- Language: Spanish
- Box office: $25,793,614

An Argentinian in New York (Spanish: Un argentino en New York) is a 1998 Argentine film directed by Juan José Jusid and starring Guillermo Francella and Natalia Oreiro. It is the story of an Argentine adolescent girl who travels to New York, and decides to stay and live there. Her father makes the decision to go to New York, a place where he has never been, to meet his daughter and try to bring her back to Buenos Aires. During his journey he'll discover that his daughter has grown, formed a music band and met an American man who she loves.

== Plot ==
Un argentino en New York tells us the story of Franco Ricci (Guillermo Francella) and his daughter Veronica (Natalia Oreiro). Franco is a porteño who is very sentimental, a musician, separated and with a couple of dreams. Veronica, a brave young girl, attractive and intelligent, who always obtains what she wants.

While Veronica was traveling through New York, she surprisingly decided to stay and live in the city. When Franco, her father, hears the news, he decides to travel and pay her a visit with the goal of bringing her back to Argentina.

Although it's hard for Franco to admit it, he will discover that in the past months Veronica has become more mature. She has formed a music band called The Verónikos, which debuted in a café and have showed promise to succeed in the music industry. She has also fallen in love with an American boy, George (Steve Wilson), which would bring envy to her father.

The movie takes place in New York, an unknown city to Franco, which brings all types of hilarious adventures. After the whole journey through Manhattan, it brings feelings between father and daughter.

Between laughs and tears, Un argentino en New York shares with us the journey in which a father realizes that her daughter is no longer a teenager, and has turned into a woman.

== Track listing ==
Un argentino en New Уork

Soundtrack album by Federico Jusid and Natalia Oreiro
- Released: 21 May 1998 (Argentina), 2002 (Russia)
- Recorded: 1-2-15 – Criteria Recording Studios, Ocean Vu Studios (Miami, Florida), Battery Studios (New York City), 3-14 – Panda, C.W. Digital Studio
- Genres: Latin pop, Soundtrack
- Length: 29:48
- Language: Spanish
- Label: BMG Ariola Argentina
- Producers: Pablo Durand, Federico Jusid

Federico Jusid and Natalia Oreiro chronology
Un argentino en New Уork (1998)	Natalia Oreiro (1998)

No.	Title	Writer(s)	Performer(s)	Length
1.	"Que Si, Que Si"	Fernando López Rossi; Pablo Durand	Natalia Oreiro	3:01
2.	"Caminos"	López Rossi; Durand	Natalia Oreiro	3:04
3.	"Welcome to New York"	Federico Jusid		1:28
4.	"Espiando a Vero"	Jusid		1:04
5.	"Magic Show"	Jusid		1:10
6.	"American Football"	Jusid		0:44
7.	"Carta a Nueva York"	Jusid		1:02
8.	"Ana"	Jusid		0:52
9.	"Encuentro en Central Park"	Jusid		3:04
10.	"Camino al Hospital"	Jusid		0:23
11.	"Chinatown by Night"	Jusid		1:33
12.	"Streap-Bar"	Jusid		1:30
13.	"L'infierno"	Jusid		1:16
14.	"Final en J.F.K."	Jusid		6:27
15.	"Que Si, Que Si" (Long Intro Version)	López Rossi; Durand	Natalia Oreiro	3:10
Total length:				29:48
