= Natalia Oreiro (album) =

Studio album by Natalia Oreiro
- Released: 14 July 1998 (Argentina)
- Recorded: 1998 (Buenos Aires (Argentina), Miami, Florida (US)
- Genre: Latin pop
- Length: 44:13; 62:23 (1999 reissue)
- Language: Spanish
- Label: BMG Ariola Argentina
- Producer: Pablo Durand

Natalia Oreiro chronology
Un Argentino en New York (1998)	Natalia Oreiro (1998)	Tu Veneno (2000)

International Cover
- International Album Cover

Natalia Oreiro is the self-titled debut Spanish-language album by Uruguayan singer and actress Natalia Oreiro.

== Background ==
Due to a big success of a song Que si, que si from the movie Un Argentino en New York, Natalia Oreiro was offered collaboration with music company BMG Argentina to make her own CD. Pablo Durand became the producer of the CD. The CD was recorded in first half-year of 1998 in studios in Buenos Aires and also at Miami in Florida. The title of the CD is simple – Natalia Oreiro since this was the first singer's debut CD.

== Recording ==
For the CD there were 11 songs recorded and the 12th song is a bonus song. It is "Que si, que si" from the movie Un Argentino en New York. All songs are in Latin style, and there are also two ballads. Seven songs were composed for Natalia by duo Pablo Durand and Fernando Lopez Rossi, who wrote big hit "Que si, que si". Romantic song "Me muero de amor" was written by famous composing duo Claudia Brant and Coti Sorokin. Cladia Brant together with Marcel Wengrowsky worked together on song called "Nada mas que hablar". Three writers were working together to create a hit song "Huracán" and song called "Valor" was for Natalia written and composed by Donato Poveda. The final sound of the CD was directed by Afo Verde and background sounds of saxophone were recorded by Ed Calle.

Songs from the CD Natalia Oreiro were used in telenovela "Muñeca Brava" (Feisty Doll) where Natalia played a main character in years 1998–1999. Song "Cambio Dolor" was the title song and song "Me muero de amor" was a love theme of main characters.

== Singles ==
"De Tu Amor" It is the first single designated for promo CD. It was released in the summer of 1998, and the Argentine TOP 100 Singles Chart got 27 September 1998 and was deployed to 56.místo. Top with single ranked third place overall and is held in the charts 26 weeks to 14 March 1999. The single was also a big hit in Chile and Spain. Video for the first single from the CD Natalia Oreiro, which came out in the summer of 1998 and became the promotion of a new CD novice singer. Video clip contains no storyline, this is just a different incarnation Naty from Baroque through ladies player of American football to the seductive sexy vixen.

"Cambio Dolor" second single in Argentina has become a signature tune telenovela Muneca Brava "Cambio Dolor". Song was deployed to 52.místo to Argentine TOP 100 chart on 24 January 1999. The song got up to fifth place overall and remained in the charts 19 weeks to 23 May 1999. Cambio Dolor became a huge hit in many countries of Western Europe, which aired telenovela Muneca Brava. A number one hit song was also in Israel and Russia, as well as all other world countries where the telenovela aired. This video was filmed as a jingle telenovela Muneca Brava, but has also become another official music video (unlike other soap operas Natalie jingles). Naty in one interview, she said that when the movie was filmed, and her director just told me to let the natural and dances and sings how it feels, and edited a result we see ourselves. He came out with a music video premiere telenovela Muneca Brava at the end of 1998.

== Release and promotion ==
The first single released to promote the CD was "De tu amor" that was released in summer 1998. Natalia filmed also a music video for this song. CD Natalia Oreiro was released on 14 July 1998. Due to the big success of telenovela "Muneca Brava" abroad, the CD was also released in many other countries in years of 1999 and mainly in 2000. The content is the same just the cover differs.

Natalia was pictured on the cover of her CD as a princess in beautiful dresses and nice hairdo. There were altogether 11 photos used for the cover and booklet. The photographer was Claudio Divella and the whole design was made by two graphic designers Scherman and Veraldi. The booklet is in pink tone with other graphic details. In the booklet there are texts to all songs, information about the CD making process and also thanks from Natalia to her co-authors, her family and to her fans.

There was a new cover and booklet made for the international edition of the CD. In the new version there are seven photos from which four are in black and white. Booklet lacks lyrics. The rest remains the same.

== Chart performance ==
In the first week of selling there was sold 60.000 CDs in Argentina. Altogether there was about 400.000 CDs sold in Argentina. In the rest of Latin America there were another 200.000 CDs sold. In Spain the CD sold 300.000 copies and in other European countries there were about 700.000 CDs sold (in the Czech Republic it was 85.000 and in Poland 150.000). Overall there were about 1.600.000 CDs sold and the disc got 10 times platinum award.

In Argentina only the CD was awarded with two platinum discs for selling. In many East European countries as well as in Russia and Israel and moreover in Latin America the CD got many golden or platinum discs for the selling.

== Track listing ==
No.	Title	Writer(s)	Length
1.	"De Tu Amor"	Fernando López Rossi; Pablo Durand	3:57
2.	"Uruguay"	López Rossi; Durand	3:44
3.	"Se Pegó en Mi Piel"	López Rossi; Durand	4:09
4.	"Me Muero de Amor"	Claudia Brant; Coti Sorokin	3:55
5.	"Cambio Dolor"	López Rossi; Durand	4:05
6.	"Valor"	Donato Poveda	3:14
7.	"Sabrosito y Dulzón"	López Rossi; Durand	4:00
8.	"Vengo del Mar"	López Rossi; Durand	3:35
9.	"Huracán"	Miguel Orlando Iacopetti; T. Serna; Tito Romeo	3:34
10.	"Nada Más que Hablar"	Marcelo Wengrovsky; Dany Tomas; Brant	3:22
11.	"Y Te Vas Conmigo"	López Rossi; Durand	3:31
Total length:			41:06

International bonus track
No.	Title	Writer(s)	Length
12.	"Que Si, Que Si"	López Rossi; Durand	3:02
Total length:			44:13

Reissue bonus tracks
No.	Title	Writer(s)	Length
13.	"Me Muero de Amor" (2 Effective Remix)	Brant; Sorokin	4:06
14.	"Huracán" (2 Effective Latin Power Mix)	Iacopetti; Serna; Romeo	3:38
15.	"De Tu Amor" (Bianco Mix)	López Rossi; Durand	3:50
16.	"Que Si, Que Si" (Little Corp. RMX)	López Rossi; Durand	3:24
17.	"Cambio Dolor" (Pumpin' Dolls Radio Edit)	López Rossi; Durand	3:53
Total length:			62:23

== Official versions and remixes ==
- "Cambio Dolor" (Pumpin' Dolls Radio Edit) (3:58)
- "Cambio Dolor" (Pumpin' Dolls Pool Party Club Mix) (6:10)
- "De Tu Amor" (Pumpin' Dolls Radio Edit) (3:53)
- "De Tu Amor" (Pumpin' Dolls Fashion Club Mix) (7:53)
- "De Tu Amor" (Bianco Mix) (3:50)
- "Huracán" (2 Effective Latin Power Mix) (3:37)
- "Me Muero de Amor" (2 Effective Remix) (3:56)
- "Que Si, Que Si" (Little Corp. RMX) (3:24)
- "Que Si, Que Si" (Long Intro Version) (3:10)
- "Caminos" (3:26) – appears on the soundtrack of the film "Un Argentino en New York" (1998)
- "03 03 456" (Duet with Raffaella Carrà) (3:21) – appears on Raffaella Carrà's Spanish compilation "Fiesta: Grandes Éxitos" (1999)

== Charts ==
Chart (2000)	Peak position
Czech Albums (IFPI)	1
Greek International Albums (IFPI Greece)	4
Hungarian Albums (MAHASZ)	1
Slovak Albums (IFPI)	1

=== Year-end charts ===
Chart (2000)	Peak position
Hungarian Albums Chart	5

Chart (2001)	Peak position
Hungarian Albums Chart	96

== Certifications ==
Region	Certification	Certified units/sales
Argentina (CAPIF)	Platinum	130,000
Bosnia and Herzegovina	Gold	
Croatia	Platinum	
Czech Republic	3× Platinum	
Greece (IFPI Greece)	Platinum	30,000^{^}
Hungary (MAHASZ)	Platinum	20,000
Israel	Platinum	
Japan (RIAJ)	Gold	100,000^{^}
Poland (ZPAV)	Platinum	130,000
Puerto Rico	Platinum	20,000
Romania	Platinum	
Russia (NFPF)	Platinum	20,000^{*}
Summaries
Worldwide	—	1,800,000
^{*} Sales figures based on certification alone.^{^} Shipments figures based on certification alone.
