= Hey Now Now =

1998 single by Swirl 360

Single by Swirl 360

from the album Ask Anybody
- Released: July 7, 1998
- Length: 4:37; 4:07 (single version)
- Label: Mercury
- Songwriters: Shelly Peiken; John Shanks; Denny Scott; Kenny Scott
- Producer: Michael Mangini

Swirl 360 singles chronology
"Hey Now Now" (1998)	"Candy in the Sun" (1998)

Music video
- "Hey Now Now" on YouTube

"Hey Now Now" is a song by American pop rock group Swirl 360. It was released as the lead single from the group's debut studio album, Ask Anybody. The song is the band's only significant hit, reaching number 47 in the United States, number 22 in New Zealand, and number 12 in Canada.

== Charts ==
Weekly chart performance for "Hey Now Now"
Chart (1998)	Peak position
Australia (ARIA)	68
Canada Top Singles (RPM)	12
Canada Adult Contemporary (RPM)	54
Netherlands (Single Top 100)	96
New Zealand (Recorded Music NZ)	22
Scottish Singles Sales (Official Charts)	50
UK Singles (Official Charts)	61
US Billboard Hot 100	47
US Mainstream Top 40 (Billboard)	30

== Release history ==
Release dates and formats for "Hey Now Now"
Region	Date	Format(s)	Label(s)	Ref(s).
United States	May 18, 1998	Modern rock radio	Mercury	
United States	June 30, 1998	Contemporary hit radio	Mercury	
Canada	July 7, 1998	CD	Mercury	
Japan	August 26, 1998	CD	Mercury	
United Kingdom	November 2, 1998	CD; cassette	Mercury	
