= Gaspër Jakova Mërturi =

Gaspër Jakova Mërturi (1870–1941) was a figure involved in the Albanian National Awakening and a talented writer.

Mërturi was from northern Albania who had been defrocked as Catholic priest and was an ex-Jesuit. Italy recruited individuals from the Albanian Catholic clergy to work for them and he became employed as an instructor at the Collegio of Sant'Adriano and later as a publicist editing works such as newspapers in Albanian. Mërturi along with Italo-Albanian Anselmo Lorecchio during June 1904 published an Italian language daily newspaper Agenzia Balcanica ed Italiana that focused on politics, finance and commercial information. Its aims were "to enlighten the European public opinion" about the rights and necessary reforms for the vilayets of Üsküb, Shkodër, Monastir, Yanina, and Salonica. In Rome, Mërturi began publication of a fortnightly newspaper The Herald of Albania written mainly in Italian on September 15, 1904, that focused on Albanian independence and unity, without going into details about how they would be achieved. Mërturi encouraged the writing talents of his students like Luigj Gurakuqi, who also became contributors to the Albanian national awakening.
