= La Noche del 10 =

2005 Argentine television show

La Noche del 10 ("The Night of Number 10") was an Argentine television talk and variety show hosted by former footballer Diego Maradona, which aired for one season on Canal 13 in 2005.

== History ==
On 15 August 2005, Maradona made his debut as host, with Pelé as his main guest on opening night. The two had a friendly chat, showing no signs of their past differences. The opening episode also featured an animated sequence satirising their rivalry, in which cartoon versions of Maradona and Pelé competed for the number 10 shirt.

Guests were drawn primarily from the worlds of football and show business, although the programme also featured political figures. They included footballers Ronaldo and Zinedine Zidane, Cuban leader Fidel Castro, and boxers Roberto Durán and Mike Tyson. Maradona gave Tyson a signed Argentina jersey, which the boxer wore during a subsequent visit to rival nation Brazil.

The programme became a ratings success in Argentina. It ran for 13 episodes, concluding on 7 November 2005 with a special edition broadcast from Luna Park in Buenos Aires.
