= Gino Renni =

Italian-Argentine actor and singer (1943–2021)

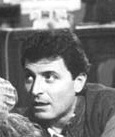
- Born: Luigi Melieni Mollo; 7 June 1943; Corigliano Calabro, Calabria, Italy
- Died: 1 August 2021 (aged 78); Buenos Aires, Argentina
- Occupations: Actor, singer, comedian, politician

Luigi Melieni Mollo (7 June 1943 – 1 August 2021), known professionally as Gino Renni, was an Italian-Argentine actor, comedian and singer.

== Biography ==
Born in Corigliano Calabro, Italy, his career began in 1960. He was known for his role as Gino Foderone in the Explosive Squad and Craziest Bathers in the World movie series.

In 2013, Renni ran for a seat in the Chamber of Deputies in Italy as a member of the Democratic Party but lost the election.

Renni was hospitalized with COVID-19 in June 2021, shortly after getting vaccinated in Buenos Aires. He died two months later on 1 August 2021, from complications caused by the infection, aged 78.
