= Victoria Onetto =

Argentine actress (born 1973)

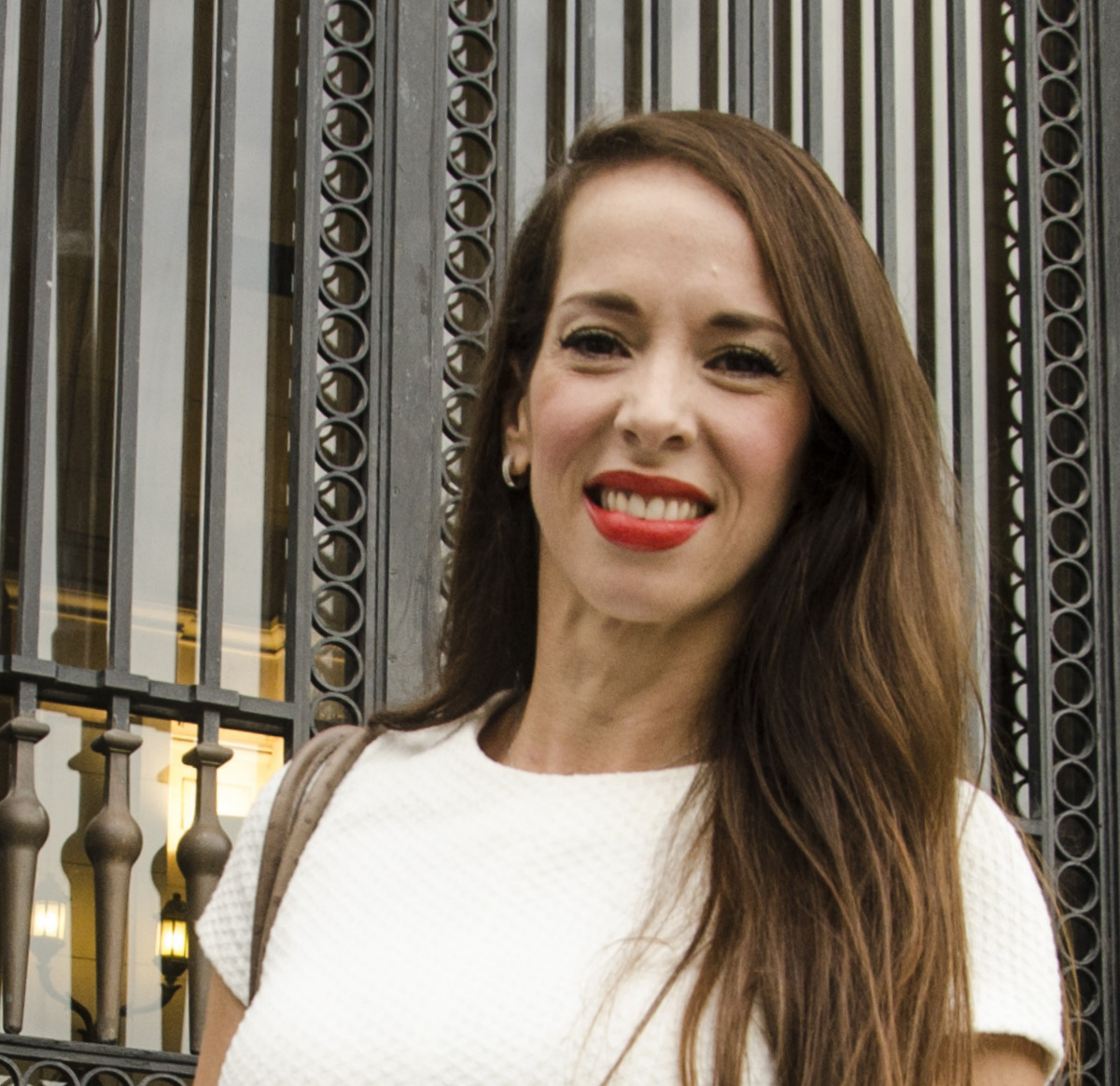
- Onetto in 2015
- Born: Victoria Belloni Onetto; 26 June 1973 (age 53); Buenos Aires, Argentina
- Other name: Victoria Onetto
- Education: Facultad Latinoamericana de Ciencias Sociales
- Occupations: Actress, television host, politician and feminist
- Years active: 1986–present
- Spouse: Juan Blas Caballero (m. 2010)
- Children: 1
- Website: VictoriaOnetto.com

Victoria Onetto (born June 26, 1973 in Buenos Aires) is an Argentine actress who worked in many soap operas and films.

== Movies ==
- De mi barrio con amor (1995)
- Carlos Monzón, el segundo juicio (1996)
- El mundo contra mí (1996)
- La belleza de Helena (1997)
- Tesoro mío (1999)
- Balada del primer amor (1999)
- Chicos ricos (2000)
- El favor (2003)
- Peligrosa obsesión (2004)

== TV ==
- Chicas y chicos (1986)
- Polenta (1987)
- Colorín colorado (1988)
- Clave de sol (1990)
- El árbol azul (1991)
- Princesa (1992)
- Buena pata (1993)
- Canto rodado (1993)
- Solo para parejas (1993)
- Alta comedia (1994)
- Marco el candidato (1994)
- Con alma de tango (1995)
- Nueve lunas (1995)
- Gino (1996)
- Archivo negro (1996)
- Poliladron (1997)
- Son o se hacen (1997)
- Verdad consecuencia (1998)
- Muñeca brava (1998–1999)
- Tiempofinal (2000)
- El sodero de mi vida (2001)
- Franco Buenaventura, el profe (2002)
- Son amores (2002)
- De la cama al living (2004)
- Conflictos en red (2005)
- La panadería de Don Felipe (2005)
- Un cortado (2006)
- Hechizada (2006)
- Bailando por un sueño 4 (2007)
- Un tiempo después (2008)
- ShowMatch (2009)
- Botineras (2010)
- Solamente vos (2013)

== Unit ==
- Botines (2005)

== Theater ==
- 1995-1996: Don Fausto
- 1996-1997: Humores que Matan
- 2000: La Cena de los Tontos
- 2002-2003: Pijamas
- 2009: Closer
- 2010: El Arco del Triunfo
- 2011-2015: La Mujer Justa
- 2016: Relato de una Mujer
- 2017: Mujeres Perfectas
- 2017: Acaloradas
- 2017: Postparto
- 2018: Locos de Contento
