= Corigliano Calabro =

- Frazione
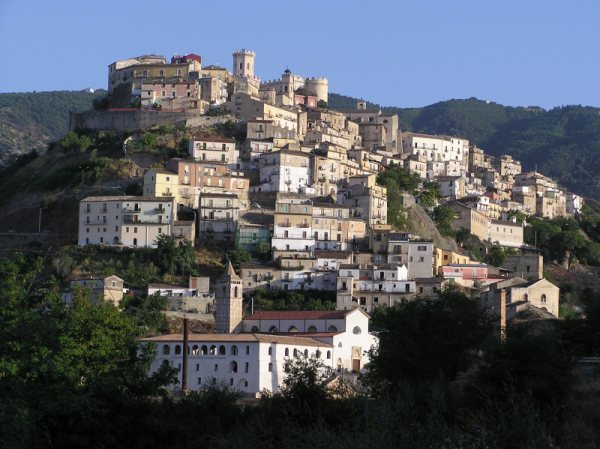
- Panorama of Corigliano Calabro

- Location of Corigliano Calabro in Italy
- Coordinates: 39°36′N 16°31′E
- Country: Italy
- Region: Calabria
- Province: Cosenza (CS)
- Comune: Corigliano-Rossano

Area
  - Total: 196 km^{2} (76 sq mi)
- Elevation: 210 m (690 ft)

Population (31 March 2017)
  - Total: 40,428
  - Density: 206/km^{2} (534/sq mi)
- Demonym: Coriglianesi
- Time zone: UTC+1 (CET)
  - Summer (DST): UTC+2 (CEST)
- Postal code: 87064
- Dialing code: 0983
- Patron saint: Saint Francis of Paola
- Saint day: April 25
- Website: Official website

Corigliano Calabro is a town and a frazione of Corigliano-Rossano located in the province of Cosenza, c. 40 km northeast of the city of Cosenza, in Calabria, southern Italy.

== Geography ==
It is situated near the mouth of a river of the same name, and contains an aqueduct. On an eminence overlooking the town is a feudal castle with massive towers and a deep trench.

In the comune are the ruins of the ancient city of Thurii, a former bishopric which remains a Latin titular see as Thurio. Nearby is Sibari, the site of the ancient city of Sybaris.

== History ==
In 1879, it had a population of about 13,000. It had five churches, six convents, and a few public buildings. Licorice was made on a large scale, and there was a considerable trade in timber, wine, oranges, lemons and olives.

Flag

Coat of Arms

== International relations ==
Corigliano Calabro is twinned with:

- Bujumbura, Burundi

== People ==
- Luigi Palma, Italian constitutionalist
- Gennaro Gattuso, Italian footballer
- Costantino Mortati, Italian constitutionalist
- Francesco Pianeta, boxer
- Gino Renni, actor, comedian and singer
- Francesco Serra, father of Brazilian politician José Serra
- Elsa Serrano, fashion designer
- Vincenzo Tieri, journalist, writer, playwright
- Aroldo Tieri, actor, son of the former

== Sources ==
- Ripley, George; Dana, Charles A., eds. (1879). "Corigliano" . The American Cyclopædia.
